= Gualaca bus crash =

2023 transport disaster in Panama

Details
- Date: February 15, 2023
- Location: Gualaca District, Chiriquí Province, Panama
- Coordinates: 8°37′49″N 82°12′48″W
- Incident type: Plunge from cliff
- Cause: Driver error

Statistics
- Deaths: 42
- Injured: 24

On February 15, 2023, 42 people were killed in a bus crash in Panama. The bus was headed to a migrant reception center in the town of Gualaca when it crashed in Gualaca District, Chiriquí Province, in the west of the country, about 67.8 km (42.1 mi) from the Costa Rican border.

The bus carried 66 passengers, most presumably migrants traveling north towards the United States after crossing the Darién Gap from Colombia into Panama. It drove off a cliff after the driver lost control while performing a U-turn near the migrant center entrance. Twenty people were hospitalized with serious injuries. It is one of the deadliest migrant accidents in Panama's history.

== Background ==
The Darién Gap is a break in the Pan-American Highway that consists of large areas of undeveloped swampland and forest. In 2022, 248,000 migrants crossed it into North America, followed by 32,800 in 2023 by the time of the accident.

This bus carried migrants who had already crossed the gap toward a shelter in Chiriquí, a western province bordering Costa Rica. Their scheduled final destination was the United States.

== Crash ==
On February 15, 2023, the bus driver attempted to turn around after missing the shelter entrance and lost control of the bus, veering off the road and down a ravine, hitting a minibus on a road below. Both drivers on the bus were appropriately licensed Panamanians, one of whom died. The crash took place approximately 400 km (250 mi) west of Panama City, after the bus had traveled 700 km (430 mi) in around 14 hours.

== Victims ==
Thirty-nine people were killed in the crash with another 24 people injured. The United Nations Children's Fund told Agence France-Presse three children died. A nearby hospital admitted ten injured children between the ages of 4 and 11. The official list of passengers was released a day after the crash. There were 22 Ecuadorians, 16 Haitians, 11 Venezuelans, six Brazilians, five Colombians, two Cameroonians, two Cubans, one Nigerian, and one Eritrean.

== Response ==
Laurentino Cortizo, the President of Panama, tweeted: "This news is unfortunate for Panama and for the region. The National Government extends its condolences to the families of those killed in this accident, and reiterates its commitment to continue providing humanitarian aid and decent conditions to deal with irregular migration." Officials from Colombia and Panama agreed to boost joint military operations in the Darién jungle to prevent irregular migration, drug trafficking and illegal mining.

== See also ==
- Chiapas truck crash
- 2022 San Antonio migrant deaths
