= Pedregal =

Pedregal may refer to:

== Panama ==
- Pedregal, Boquerón, Chiriquí, Panama
- Pedregal, David, Chiriquí, Panama
- Pedregal, Panamá District, Panamá Province, Panama
- Pedregal (Panama Metro), a rapid transit station in Panama City, Panama

== Other ==
- Pedregal (Costa Rica), a rock art site
- El Pedregal, province of Guadalajara, Spain
- Jardines del Pedregal, Mexico City, Mexico
- Pedregal River, northern Venezuela
- El Pedregal Volcano in Honduras
