= Remedios =

Remedios may refer to:

== Places ==
- Remedios, Cuba, a municipality in the province of Villa Clara, Cuba
- Remedios, Antioquia, a municipality in Antioquia Department, Colombia
- Remedios, Chiriquí, a corregimiento of Panama
- Remedios District, district (distrito) of Chiriquí Province in Panama
- Remédios, civil parish in the Azores, Portugal
- Los Remedios, a district of Seville, Andalusia, Spain
- Los Remedios National Park in Mexico

== People ==
- Remedios Amaya (born 1962), Spanish singer
- Remedios Varo (1908–1963), Spanish-Mexican para-surrealist painter and anarchist
- Alberto Remedios (1935–2016), British operatic tenor
- Jeffrey Remedios, Canadian businessman, president of Universal Music Canada
