= Tinajas =

Tinajas may refer to:

- Tinajas, Chiriquí, Panama
- Tinajas, Spain
