= Dolega District =

- District

- Location of the district capital in Panama
- Coordinates: 8°33′36″N 82°25′12″W
- Country: Panama
- Province: Chiriquí Province
- Capital: San Francisco de Dolega

Area
  - Total: 97.1 sq mi (251.4 km^{2})

Population (2023)
  - Total: 37,648
- Time zone: UTC-5 (ETZ)

Dolega District is a district in the Chiriquí Province of Panama. It covers an area of 251.4 km^{2} (97.1 sq mi) and has a population of 37,678 inhabitants as per the 2023 census. The district was established in 1855 before being annexed to the Boqueron District in 1868, and was re-created again two years later. The district has its capital at the city of Dolega.

== History ==
There are several theories as to how the settlement of Dolega was established, with the earliest pointing to its establishment by Antonio de la Rocha in 1635, and others mentioning it as in 1671 by Gómez Suárez de Figueroa, and in 1795 by the Franciscan missonaries. Dolega was established as a district in 1855. In 1862, the Assmebly of Panama enacted a law to divide the Chiriquí department was officially divided into eleven districts, which included Dolega. In February 1866, a rebel group named "guaraperos" under the command of Aristides de Obaldía revolted against the government and attacked government positions in David. After the attack was suppressed, the district was annexed to Boquerón District in 1868. The district was re-established two years later, and was one of the administrative units when Panama became a republic in 1904. The region has historically been linked with the production of panela from sugercane.

== Etymology ==
According to historian Beatriz Miranda de Cabal, the name "Dolega" refers to a term usde by the indigenous Indians and means "place of the hummingbird". Historian Alberto Osorio indicates that the name was derived from one of the indigenous chieftains known as "Dolegaya". As per historian Rubén Darío Carles, it means "site of the visitflower" or "slaughter of the hummingbird" with "Dole" meaning hummingbird or visitoflower and "go" meaning to kill or a place.

== Geography ==
Dolega District is one of the 82 districts of Panama, and is part of the Chiriquí Province. It is spread over an area of 251.4 km^{2} (97.1 sq mi).

== Administration and politics ==
The district has its capital at the city of Dolega. The district is divided administratively into the following corregimientos–Dolega, Dos Ríos, Los Algarrobos, Los Anastacios, Potrerillos, Potrerillos Abajo, Rovira, and Tinajas. The corregimiento of Los Algarrobos was created from Dolega by Law 43 on 5 August 2002.

The National Assembly of Panama has 71 members, who are elected directly from single and multi-member constituencies. The district forms part of the Chiriquí Province, which elects three members to the National Assembly. The district forms part of the Chiriquí Province, which has seven electoral circuits, and elects 11 members to the National Assembly.

== Demographics ==
As per the 2023 census, Dolega District had a population of 37,678 inhabitants. The population increased from 25,102 in the 2010 census. The population consisted of 18,369 males and 19,309 females. About 8,603 (22.8%) of the inhabitants were below the age of 14 years and 3,800 inhabitants (10.1%) were above the age of 65 years. The majority (58.4%) of the population was classified as urban while the remaining 41.6% was classified as rural. Non-indigenous, non-Afro-descendant people (77.5%) formed the largest ethnic group in the district, followed by Afro-descendant people (13.1%) and Ngäbe people (8.8%).
