= Guaca =

Guaca may refer to:

- Guacá, a corregimiento in Panama
- Guaca, Santander, a town in Colombia
- Guaca, a character in the TV series The Emperor's New School
- Huaca, in the Quechuan languages of South America, a revered object or location
