= Santa Clara, Chiriquí =

Santa Clara
- corregimiento
- Location within Panama
- Coordinates: 8°50′0″N 82°45′30″W
- Country: Panama
- Province: Chiriquí
- District: Renacimiento
- Established: April 30, 2003

Area
  - Land: 67 km^{2} (26 sq mi)

Population (2010)
  - Total: 2,642
  - Density: 39.5/km^{2} (102/sq mi)
- Population density calculated based on land area.
- Time zone: UTC−5 (EST)

Santa Clara is a corregimiento (subdistrict) in Renacimiento District, Chiriquí Province, Panama. It has a land area of 67 square kilometres (26 sq mi) and had a population of 2,642 as of 2010, giving it a population density of 39.5 inhabitants per square kilometre (102/sq mi). The corregimiento was created by Law 41 of April 30, 2003.

The area includes a transient population of Ngöbe and other indigenous people who labor in the fields. It is located approximately 12 miles (19 km) northwest of Volcán. Rio Sereno, the governmental seat of the Renacimiento district, and the Costa Rican border are about 6 kilometers to the west.

Its primary source of income is coffee, supplemented by other crops. It is home to Cafe Duran (whose coffee is widely distributed in Panama), Finca Hartman, Cafe Balboa and Cafe Flor de Chiriquí, and some APAASAC producers of organic, shade grown coffee. The rich volcanic soil also produces plantains, various types of beans, oranges, avocados and more.

== Climate and natural resources ==
Santa Clara receives ample rainfall, estimated at 4 metres (13 ft) per year. The rainy season extends from April through mid-January. At an altitude of 1,200 metres (3,900 ft), the area is cooler than coastal Panama. Temperatures range from 20 to 30 °C (68 to 86 °F).

The Mesoamerican Biological Corridor (in Spanish Corridor Biológico Mesoamericano) passes nearby. As a result, the area attracts a wide variety of migrating birds. The Chiriquí Highlands, in which Santa Clara is located, forms part of the Talamanca Mountain Range.

== Government ==
Santa Clara has a representative in the regional government of Renacimiento located in Río Serreno.

== Infrastructure ==
Santa Clara has electrical service which reaches most houses. The water system is near universal as well; major improvements were made in 2010. Trash service is provided through the regional government, but this started only in 2010. Prior to this, locals burned or buried their trash, including plastic and glass. The area is served by a winding road that goes to the communities of Río Sereno in the west and Volcán to the east.

== Health ==
The community has a health center staffed once a week by nurses. Every other month doctors hold a clinic. There is a larger clinic in Rio Sereno. The nearest hospital is in David, more than an hour away by ambulance. There is no helicopter service.

Locals report some early teen pregnancy and some churches have sponsored sex education talks organized by Peace Corps volunteers.

== Transport ==
Santa Clara is served by taxis from Río Sereno, private vehicles and buses. Buses leave Sereno for David about every 45–50 minutes, with exceptions due to a variety of reasons. Buses are of the type called 'Coasters', seating about 24 people but at often filled with standing passengers. Fares to David as of 2010 are $3.90 and take 2 1/2 hours, to Volcan $1.90, taking 45 minutes. Both trips involve travel on the very windy, hilly road between Santa Clara and Volcán.
