= Tolé District =

- District

- Location of the district capital in Panama
- Coordinates: 8°15′0″N 81°39′36″W
- Country: Panama
- Province: Chiriquí Province
- Capital: Tolé

Area
  - Total: 187.2 sq mi (484.9 km^{2})

Population (2023)
  - Total: 13,193
- Time zone: UTC-5 (ETZ)

Tolé District is a district in the Chiriquí Province of Panama. It covers an area of 484.9 km^{2} (187.2 sq mi) and has a population of 13,193 inhabitants as per the 2023 census. The city of Tolé, which was established in 1775, serves as the capital. The district was officially created in 1855. Veladero formed part of a historical route between Chiriqui region and Panama City. The Barro Blanco Dam, on the Tabasara River, is located in the district.

== History ==
The settlement of Tolé was established as San Miguel de Tolé on 29 September 1775 by Fray Francisco Vidal of the Franciscan missionaries. Tolé District was officially established in 1855. The corregimiento of Veladero in the district, located along the Inter-American Highway, was part of the historical route that connected Chiriquí and Veraguas regions to Panama City via the port of Remedios, and was used as an overnight stop by cattle drivers transporting livestock.

== Geography ==
Tolé District is one of the 82 districts of Panama, and is part of the Chiriquí Province. It is spread over an area of 484.9 km^{2} (187.2 sq mi). The highest point in the district is located at the corregimiento of Cerro Viejo, which provides a view of the settlements and the coast. The Barro Blanco Dam is located on the Tabasara River, and hosts a hydroelectric facility. The dam, which was constructed in the 2010s, has caused flooding of traditional indigeous settlements, and negative environmental impact. Salto de la Iguana is a major waterfall in the district.

== Administration and politics ==
The city of Tolé serves as the capital of the district. It is divided administratively into the nine corregimientos–Tolé, Bella Vista, Cerro Viejo, El Cristo, Justo Fidel Palacios, Lajas de Tolé, Potrero de Caña, Quebrada de Piedra, and Veladero.

The National Assembly of Panama has 71 members, who are elected directly from single and multi-member constituencies. The district forms part of the Chiriquí Province, which elects three members to the National Assembly. The district forms part of the Chiriquí Province, which has seven electoral circuits, and elects 11 members to the National Assembly.

== Demographics and culture ==
As per the 2023 census, Tolé District had a population of 13,193 inhabitants. The population increased from 11,885 in the 2010 census. The population consisted of 6,639 males and 6,554 females. About 3,905 (29.6%) of the inhabitants were below the age of 14 years and 1,601 inhabitants (12.1%) were above the age of 65 years. The majority (76.9%) of the population was classified as rural while the remaining 23.1% was classified as urban. Non-indigenous, non-Afro-descendant people (54.1%) formed the largest ethnic group in the district, followed by Ngäbe people (36.7%) and Afro-descendant people (8.8%).

The traditional craft and native fair is held annually on 19 March, which showcases various handicrafts and serves as a social festival.
