= El Puerto =

El Puerto is the name of:

== Places ==
- El Puerto, Dominican Republic, a municipal district in San José de los Llanos
- El Puerto, Chiriquí, Panama
- El Puerto (Somiedo), a parish of Somiedo, Spain
- El Puerto de Santa María, Cádiz, Spain

== Newspapers ==
- El Puerto (newspaper), a newspaper from Pichilemu, Chile, published in 1908
