= Democracia Municipality =

Municipality in Falcón, Venezuela

Democracia Municipality Municipio Democracia
- Municipality
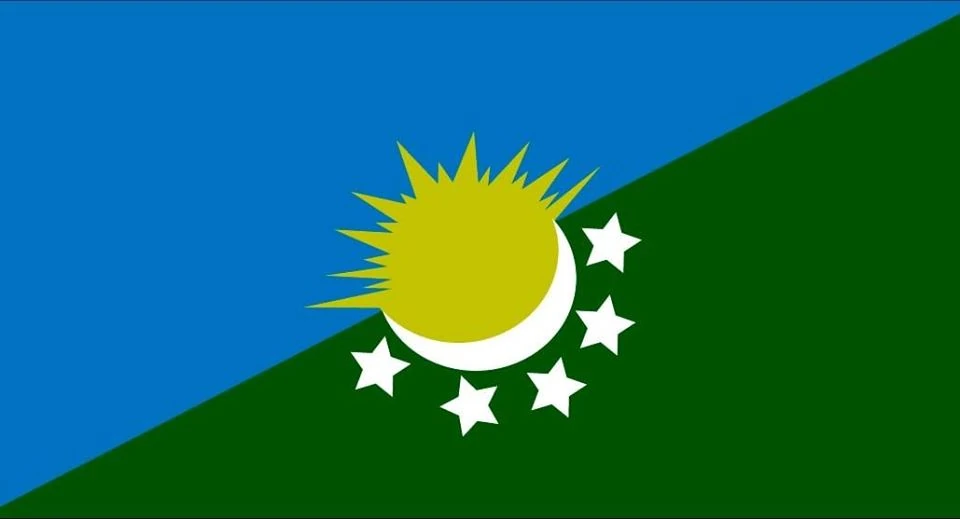
- Flag Seal

- Location in Falcón

- Location in Venezuela
- Country: Venezuela
- State: Falcón
- Municipal seat: Pedregal

Government
  - Mayor: Rómulo Gutiérrez Pereira (PSUV)

Area
  - Total: 2,706.7 km^{2} (1,045.1 sq mi)

Population (2011)
  - Total: 11,526
  - Density: 4.2583/km^{2} (11.029/sq mi)
- Time zone: UTC−4 (VET)

Democracia Municipality is located in Falcón state, Venezuela. The municipality has a total surface of 2602 km^{2} and it has some 11,526 inhabitant (2011 census). Its capital is Pedregal.
