= Dominical =

Dominical may refer to:

- Dominical, Puntarenas, Costa Rica
- Dominical, Chiriquí, Panama
- Dominical letter
- Dominical saying
