= Baco =

Baco may refer to:

== Places ==
- Baco, Oriental Mindoro, a municipality in the Philippines
- Baco, Ethiopia
  - Baco Airport
- Baco, Chiriquí, Panama
- Baltimore County, Maryland

== Other uses ==
- Baco (crater), a lunar impact crater
- Baco (god), a Celtic god of the boar
- Baco noir, a grape variety
- Bacchus (Dionysus), in Portuguese and Spanish
- Baco, a former ropeway manufacturer
- British Academic Conference in Otolaryngology

== People ==
- Abdou Baco (born c. 1965), Mahoraisan writer
- Baco Exu do Blues (born 1996), Brazilian rapper, composer, and singer
- John Baco (c. 1290 – 1346), also known as John Baconthorpe, English Carmelite friar
- Karol Bačo (born 1978), Slovak water polo player
- Peter Baco (born 1945), Slovak politician and member of the European Parliament
