= Manaca, Chiriqui =

Corregimiento in Panama

Manaca
- Corregimiento
- Location within Panama
- Coordinates: 8°21′N 82°50′W
- Country: Panama
- Province: Chiriquí
- District: Barú
- Established: 2018

Area
  - Land: 80.8 km^{2} (31.2 sq mi)

Population (2023)
  - Total: 8,203
  - Density: 101.5/km^{2} (263/sq mi)
- Population density calculated based on land area.
- Time zone: UTC−5 (EST)

Manaca is a corregimiento in Barú District, Chiriquí Province, Panama. It has a land area of 80.8 square kilometres (31.2 sq mi) and had a population of 8,203 as of 2023, giving it a population density of 101.5 inhabitants per square kilometre (263/sq mi). It was established by a 2018 law that came into effect in 2020.
