= Potrerillos Arriba =

- Location within Panama
- Coordinates: 8°40′48″N 82°30′0″W
- Country: Panama
- Province: Chiriquí

Population (2008)
  - Total: 1 165

Potrerillos Arriba is a town in the Chiriquí province of Panama. The name "Potrerillos" means "Little Pastures," and is derived from the numerous stone walls built by the indigenous population several centuries ago. The walls were constructed through forced labor under the direction of Spanish settlers to form pastures for the settlers' cattle. The area of Potrerillos is divided into two towns, Potrerillos Arriba and Potrerillos Abajo, with Arriba and Abajo meaning "upper" and "lower," respectively. Both towns are near the city of David and the mountain Volcán Barú.

== Sources ==
- World Gazetteer: Panama – World-Gazetteer.com
