= Bagala =

Bagala may refer to:

- Bagala, a clan of the Jawoyn people of northern Australia
- Bágala, a town in Panama
- Baghlah, also spelt bagala, a type of Arab sailing dhow
- Bagala, a social group (community) of India
- Bagalamukhi, also known as Bagala, one of the mahavidyas and an aspect of Devi in Hinduism
