= Tijeras =

Tijeras can refer to:

- Tijeras, New Mexico, a village in central New Mexico, USA;
- Tijeras Canyon, a canyon containing the village;
- Tijeras, Chiriquí, Panama
- Scissor kick, an acrobatic movement used in sports;
