= Renacimiento District =

- District

- Location of the district capital in Panama
- Coordinates: 8°49′12″N 82°51′36″W
- Country: Panama
- Province: Chiriquí
- Capital: Río Sereno

Area
  - Total: 528.3 km^{2} (204.0 sq mi)

Population (2023)
  - Total: 22,429
- Time zone: UTC-5 (ETZ)

Renacimiento District (Spanish pronunciation: [renasiˈmjento]) Renacimiento District is a district in the Chiriquí Province of Panama. It covers an area of 528.3 km^{2} (204.0 sq mi) and had a population of 22,429 inhabitants as per the 2023 census. It was created in 1970. Río Sereno serves as the capital of the district.

== History ==
Renacimiento District was established on 3 September 1970, and is one of the youngest districts to be created in the Chiriquí province. In 2012, it hosted the 163th anniversary celebrations of the creation of Chiriquí.

== Geography ==
Renacimiento District is one of the 82 districts of Panama. It is spread over an area of 5,226.3 km^{2} (2,017.9 sq mi). It is situated at the northwestern corner of the Chiriquí province, and borders the Baru District to the south, Bugaba District to the east, and shares an international border with Costa Rica to the west. The topography consists of mostly elevated terrain, with a small proportion of plains. Cultivated crops in the district include coffee, tomato, beans, maize, and bananas.

== Administration and politics ==
Renacimiento District has its capital at the city of Río Sereno, situated at an alitude of 1,000 m (3,300 ft) above sea level. The district is divided administratively into six corregimientos–Río Sereno, Breñón, Cañas Gordas, Monte Lirio, Plaza de Caisán, Santa Cruz, Dominical, and Santa Clara.

The National Assembly of Panama has 71 members, who are elected directly from single and multi-member constituencies. The district forms part of the Chiriquí Province, which elects three members to the National Assembly. The district forms part of the Chiriquí Province, which has seven electoral circuits, and elects 11 members to the National Assembly.

== Demographics ==
As per the 2023 census, Renacimiento District had a population of 22,429 inhabitants. The population increased from 20,524 in the 2010 census. The population consisted of 11,882 and 10,547 females. About 1,725 (25.1%) of the inhabitants were below the age of 14 years and 885 inhabitants (12.9%) were above the age of 65 years. About 81.7% of the population was classified as rural and the rest (18.3%) as urban. Non-indigenous, non-Afro-descendant people (57.9%) formed the largest ethnic group in the district, followed by Ngäbe people (27.9%) and Afro-descendant people (11.9%).
