= Juay =

- Corregimiento
- Interactive map of Juay
- Location within Panama
- Coordinates: 8°17′00″N 81°57′00″W
- Country: Panama
- Province: Chiriquí
- District: San Félix

Area
  - Land: 33.2 km^{2} (12.8 sq mi)

Population (2010)
  - Total: 654
  - Density: 19.7/km^{2} (51/sq mi)
- Population density calculated based on land area.
- Time zone: UTC−5 (EST)

Juay is a corregimiento in San Félix District, Chiriquí Province, Panama. It has a land area of 33.2 square kilometres (12.8 sq mi) and had a population of 654 as of 2010, giving it a population density of 19.7 inhabitants per square kilometre (51/sq mi). Its population as of 1990 was 697; its population as of 2000 was 557.
