= Cochea =

Coordinates: 8.6000°N 82.4167°W

- Corregimiento
- Location within Panama
- Country: Panama
- Province: Chiriquí
- District: David

Area
  - Land: 58.8 km^{2} (22.7 sq mi)

Population (2010)
  - Total: 2,447
  - Density: 41.6/km^{2} (108/sq mi)
- Population density calculated based on land area.
- Time zone: UTC−5 (EST)

Cochea is a corregimiento in David District, Chiriquí Province, Panama. It has a land area of 58.8 square kilometres (22.7 sq mi) and had a population of 2,447 as of 2010, giving it a population density of 41.6 inhabitants per square kilometre (108/sq mi). Its population as of 1990 was 1,790; its population as of 2000 was 2,004.
