= Los Algarrobos, Chiriquí =

Los Algarrobos
- Corregimiento
- Location within Panama
- Coordinates: 8°30′0″N 82°25′48″W
- Country: Panama
- Province: Chiriquí
- District: Dolega
- Established: August 5, 2002

Area
  - Land: 30 km^{2} (12 sq mi)

Population (2010)
  - Total: 9,326
  - Density: 310.6/km^{2} (804/sq mi)
- Population density calculated based on land area.
- Time zone: UTC−5 (EST)

Los Algarrobos is a corregimiento in Dolega District, Chiriquí Province, Panama. It has a land area of 30 square kilometres (12 sq mi) and had a population of 9,326 as of 2010, giving it a population density of 310.6 inhabitants per square kilometre (804/sq mi). It was created by Law 43 of August 5, 2002.
