= Horconcitos =

- Corregimiento
- Location within Panama
- Coordinates: 8°19′12″N 82°9′36″W
- Country: Panama
- Province: Chiriquí
- District: San Lorenzo

Area
  - Land: 73.1 km^{2} (28.2 sq mi)

Population (2010)
  - Total: 996
  - Density: 13.6/km^{2} (35/sq mi)
- Population density calculated based on land area.
- Time zone: UTC−5 (EST)

Horconcitos is a corregimiento in San Lorenzo District, Chiriquí Province, Panama. It is the seat of San Lorenzo District. It has a land area of 73.1 square kilometres (28.2 sq mi) and had a population of 996 as of 2010, giving it a population density of 13.6 inhabitants per square kilometre (35/sq mi). Its population as of 1990 was 865; its population as of 2000 was 886.
