= Potrerillos, Chiriquí =

Potrerillos
- Corregimiento
- Location within Panama
- Coordinates: 8.706°N 82.482°W
- Country: Panama
- Province: Chiriquí
- District: Dolega

Area
  - Land: 55.4 km^{2} (21.4 sq mi)

Population (2010)
  - Total: 1,562
  - Density: 28.2/km^{2} (73/sq mi)
- Population density calculated based on land area.
- Time zone: UTC−5 (EST)

Potrerillos is a corregimiento in Dolega District, Chiriquí Province, Panama. It has a land area of 55.4 square kilometres (21.4 sq mi) and had a population of 1,562 as of 2010, giving it a population density of 28.2 inhabitants per square kilometre (73/sq mi). Its population as of 1990 was 1,157; its population as of 2000 was 1,378.
