= Boquerón, Chiriquí =

Boquerón
- Corregimiento
- Location within Panama
- Coordinates: 8°30′0″N 82°33′36″W
- Country: Panama
- Province: Chiriquí
- District: Boquerón

Area
  - Land: 40.6 km^{2} (15.7 sq mi)

Population (2023)
  - Total: 5,083
  - Density: 125.3/km^{2} (325/sq mi)
- Population density calculated based on land area.
- Time zone: UTC−5 (EST)

Boquerón is a corregimiento in Boquerón District, Chiriquí Province, Panama, near the volcano of Volcán Barú. It is the seat of Boquerón District. It has a land area of 40.6 square kilometres (15.7 sq mi) and had a population of 5,083 as of 2023, giving it a population density of 125.3 inhabitants per square kilometre (325/sq mi). Its population as of 2010 was 3,881; its population as of 2000 was 3,065.
