= Bijagual =

- Corregimiento
- Interactive map of Bijagual
- Location within Panama
- Coordinates: 8°31′00″N 82°21′00″W
- Country: Panama
- Province: Chiriquí
- District: David

Area
  - Land: 84 km^{2} (32 sq mi)

Population (2010)
  - Total: 732
  - Density: 8.7/km^{2} (23/sq mi)
- Population density calculated based on land area.
- Time zone: UTC−5 (EST)

Bijagual is a corregimiento in David District, Chiriquí Province, Panama. It has a land area of 84 square kilometres (32 sq mi) and had a population of 732 as of 2010, giving it a population density of 8.7 inhabitants per square kilometre (23/sq mi). Its population as of 1990 was 610; its population as of 2000 was 625.
