= Chiriquí, Chiriquí =

Coordinates: 8.4000°N 82.3167°W

Chiriquí
- Corregimiento
- Location within Panama
- Country: Panama
- Province: Chiriquí
- District: David

Area
  - Land: 205.1 km^{2} (79.2 sq mi)

Population (2010)
  - Total: 4,269
  - Density: 20.8/km^{2} (54/sq mi)
- Population density calculated based on land area.
- Time zone: UTC−5 (EST)

Chiriquí is a corregimiento in David District, Chiriquí Province, Panama. It has a land area of 205.1 square kilometres (79.2 sq mi) and had a population of 4,269 as of 2010, giving it a population density of 20.8 inhabitants per square kilometre (54/sq mi). Its population as of 1990 was 3,227; its population as of 2000 was 3,697.
