= San Juan, Chiriquí =

Coordinates: 8.2667°N 81.9833°W

San Juan
- Corregimiento
- Location within Panama
- Country: Panama
- Province: Chiriquí
- District: San Lorenzo

Area
  - Land: 106.1 km^{2} (41.0 sq mi)

Population (2010)
  - Total: 1,637
  - Density: 15.4/km^{2} (40/sq mi)
- Population density calculated based on land area.
- Time zone: UTC−5 (EST)

San Juan is a corregimiento in San Lorenzo District, Chiriquí Province, Panama. It has a land area of 106.1 square kilometres (41.0 sq mi) and had a population of 1,637 as of 2010, giving it a population density of 15.4 inhabitants per square kilometre (40/sq mi). Its population as of 1990 was 2,358; its population as of 2000 was 1,559.
