= David Sur, Chiriqui =

Recently created Corregimiento in Panama

David Este
- Corregimiento
- Country: Panama
- Province: Chiriquí
- District: David
- Established: 2018

Area
  - Land: 28.9 km^{2} (11.2 sq mi)

Population (2023)
  - Total: 27,145
  - Density: 937.7/km^{2} (2,429/sq mi)
- Population density calculated based on land area.
- Time zone: UTC−5 (EST)

David Este is a corregimiento in David District, Chiriquí Province, Panama. It has a land area of 28.9 square kilometres (11.2 sq mi) and had a population of 27,145 as of 2023, giving it a population density of 937.7 inhabitants per square kilometre (2,429/sq mi).
