= San Pablo Viejo =

Coordinates: 8.4833°N 82.5000°W

- Corregimiento
- Location within Panama
- Country: Panama
- Province: Chiriquí
- District: David

Area
  - Land: 59.8 km^{2} (23.1 sq mi)

Population (2010)
  - Total: 10,088
  - Density: 168.7/km^{2} (437/sq mi)
- Population density calculated based on land area.
- Time zone: UTC−5 (EST)

San Pablo Viejo is a corregimiento in David District, Chiriquí Province, Panama. It has a land area of 59.8 square kilometres (23.1 sq mi) and had a population of 10,088 as of 2010, giving it a population density of 168.7 inhabitants per square kilometre (437/sq mi). Its population as of 1990 was 2,724; its population as of 2000 was 4,768.
