= San Lorenzo District, Panama =

San Lorenzo District
- District

- Location of the district capital in Panama
- Coordinates: 8°19′12″N 82°9′36″W
- Country: Panama
- Province: Chiriquí Province
- Capital: Horconcitos

Area
  - Total: 265.9 sq mi (688.8 km^{2})

Population (2023)
  - Total: 8,031
- Time zone: UTC-5 (ETZ)

San Lorenzo District is a district in the Chiriquí Province of Panama. It covers an area of 688.8 km^{2} (265.9 sq mi) and had a population of 8,031 inhabitants as per the 2023 census. The city of Horconcitos serves as the capital.

== History ==
San Lorenzo was founded on 1 January 1621 by Fray Pedro Gaspar Rodríguez Valdera, the Apostle of the Ngäbe (Guaymí) people. The Ngäbe people were baptized on the order of Don Lorenzo del Salto, the Spanish governor of Veraguas, and the name of San Lorenzo was chosen in honor of him. The district was established officially in 1855.

== Geography ==
San Lorenzo District is one of the 82 districts of Panama. It is part of the Chiriquí Province. It is spread over an area of 688.8 km^{2} (265.9 sq mi). The district is watered by various rivers such as Fonseca, Chorcha, Soloy, San Juan, and Corrales. It is located on the banks of the Fonseca River. There are several islands, and protected wildlife refuges. The Gulf of Chiriquí National Marine Park, located in the Gulf of Chiriquí, lies close to the town of Boca Chica in the district. It was established on 6 May 1994, and covers an area of 597 km^{2} (231 sq mi).

== Administration and politics ==
San Lorenzo District has its capital at the city of Horconcitos. It is divided administratively into the following corregimientos–Horconcitos, Boca Chica, Boca del Monte, San Juan, and San Lorenzo.

The National Assembly of Panama has 71 members, who are elected directly from single and multi-member constituencies. The district forms part of the Chiriquí Province, which elects three members to the National Assembly. The district forms part of the Chiriquí Province, which has seven electoral circuits, and elects 11 members to the National Assembly.

== Demographics ==
As per the 2023 census, San Lorenzo District had a population of 8,031 inhabitants. The population increased from 7,507 in the 2010 census. The population consisted of 4,123 males and 3,908 females. About 2,033 (25.3%) of the inhabitants were below the age of 14 years and 925 inhabitants (11.5%) were above the age of 65 years. The entire population was classified as rural. Non-indigenous, non-Afro-descendant people (62.4%) formed the largest ethnic group in the district, followed by Ngäbe people (23.7%) and Afro-descendant people (13.2%).
