= Santa Cruz, Renacimiento =

Coordinates: 8.6500°N 82.7667°W

Santa Cruz
- Corregimiento
- Location within Panama
- Country: Panama
- Province: Chiriquí
- District: Renacimiento

Area
  - Land: 59.8 km^{2} (23.1 sq mi)

Population (2010)
  - Total: 1,904
  - Density: 31.8/km^{2} (82/sq mi)
- Population density calculated based on land area.
- Time zone: UTC−5 (EST)

Santa Cruz is a corregimiento in Renacimiento District, Chiriquí Province, Panama. It has a land area of 59.8 square kilometres (23.1 sq mi) and had a population of 1,904 as of 2010, giving it a population density of 31.8 inhabitants per square kilometre (82/sq mi). Its population as of 1990 was 2,859; its population as of 2000 was 2,785.
