= Las Lajas, Chiriquí =

Coordinates: 8.2500°N 81.8667°W

Las Lajas
- Corregimiento
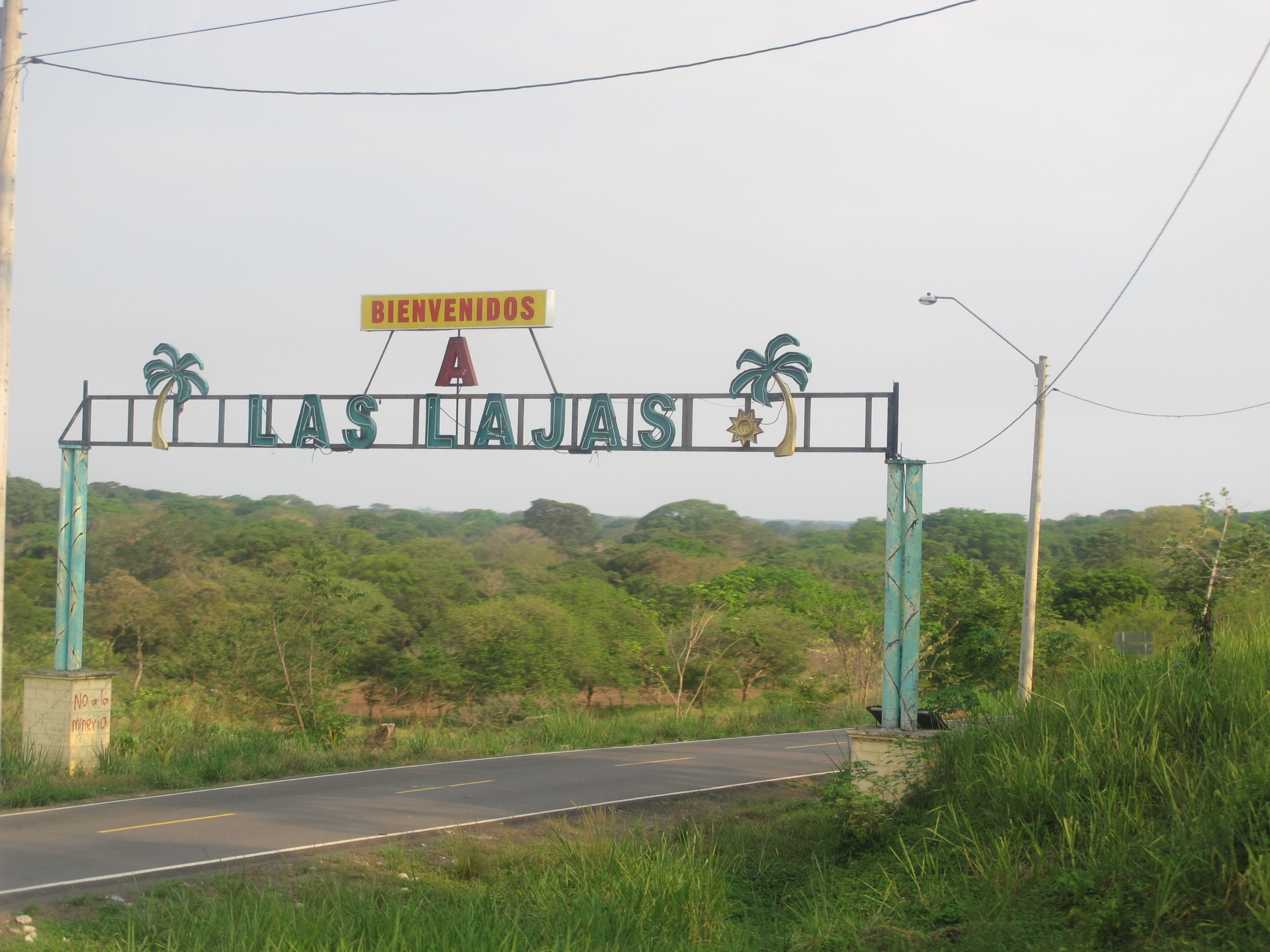

- Location within Panama
- Country: Panama
- Province: Chiriquí
- District: San Félix

Area
  - Land: 54.2 km^{2} (20.9 sq mi)

Population (2010)
  - Total: 1,521
  - Density: 28.1/km^{2} (73/sq mi)
- Population density calculated based on land area.
- Time zone: UTC−5 (EST)

Las Lajas is a corregimiento in San Félix District, Chiriquí Province, Panama. It is the seat of San Félix District. It has a land area of 54.2 square kilometres (20.9 sq mi) and had a population of 1,521 as of 2010, giving it a population density of 28.1 inhabitants per square kilometre (73/sq mi). Its population as of 1990 was 2,218; its population as of 2000 was 1,191.
