= Cerro Viejo =

Coordinates: 8.2500°N 81.5833°W

- Corregimiento
- Location within Panama
- Country: Panama
- Province: Chiriquí
- District: Tolé

Area
  - Land: 59.5 km^{2} (23.0 sq mi)

Population (2010)
  - Total: 1,768
  - Density: 29.7/km^{2} (77/sq mi)
- Population density calculated based on land area.
- Time zone: UTC−5 (EST)

Cerro Viejo is a corregimiento in Tolé District, Chiriquí Province, Panama. It has a land area of 59.5 square kilometres (23.0 sq mi) and had a population of 1,768 as of 2010, giving it a population density of 29.7 inhabitants per square kilometre (77/sq mi). Its population as of 1990 was 2,923; its population as of 2000 was 1,709.
