= Monte Lirio =

- Corregimiento
- Location within Panama
- Coordinates: 8°46′48″N 82°49′48″W
- Country: Panama
- Province: Chiriquí
- District: Renacimiento

Area
  - Land: 43.8 km^{2} (16.9 sq mi)

Population (2010)
  - Total: 2,771
  - Density: 63.2/km^{2} (164/sq mi)
- Population density calculated based on land area.
- Time zone: UTC−5 (EST)

Monte Lirio is a corregimiento (subdistrict) in Renacimiento District, Chiriquí Province, Panama. It has a land area of 43.8 square kilometres (16.9 sq mi) and had a population of 2,771 as of 2010, giving it a population density of 63.2 inhabitants per square kilometre (164/sq mi). Its population as of 1990 was 4,807; its population as of 2000 was 6,652.

The government of Panama under Martín Torrijos Espino approved numerous hydroelectric projects on the Río Viejo Chiriquí. Several were underway as of 2010. Up to 90% of the water in the watershed can be used for electrical generation, which can be used domestically or sold to other countries. According to an environmental impact study performed for the Pando and Monte Lirio hydroelectric projects there might have been some environmental impacts: changes habitat due to less erosion, changes in hydrology and disruption of the river, potentially more water use due to increased ecotourism and rafting activities.
