= Las Lomas, Chiriquí =

Coordinates: 8.4333°N 82.4000°W

Las Lomas
- Corregimiento
- Location within Panama
- Country: Panama
- Province: Chiriquí
- District: David

Area
  - Land: 76.6 km^{2} (29.6 sq mi)

Population (2010)
  - Total: 18,769
  - Density: 245.1/km^{2} (635/sq mi)
- Population density calculated based on land area.
- Time zone: UTC−5 (EST)

Las Lomas is a corregimiento in David District, Chiriquí Province, Panama. It has a land area of 76.6 square kilometres (29.6 sq mi) and had a population of 18,769 as of 2010, giving it a population density of 245.1 inhabitants per square kilometre (635/sq mi). Its population as of 1990 was 10,615; its population as of 2000 was 13,683. its population as of 2010 was 18,769 its population as of 2023 was 25,297
