= Dos Ríos, Chiriquí =

Coordinates: 8.5500°N 82.4000°W

Dos Ríos
- Corregimiento
- Location within Panama
- Country: Panama
- Province: Chiriquí
- District: Dolega

Area
  - Land: 18.1 km^{2} (7.0 sq mi)

Population (2010)
  - Total: 1,634
  - Density: 90.2/km^{2} (234/sq mi)
- Population density calculated based on land area.
- Time zone: UTC−5 (EST)

Dos Ríos is a corregimiento in Dolega District, Chiriquí Province, Panama. It has a land area of 18.1 square kilometres (7.0 sq mi) and had a population of 1,634 as of 2010, giving it a population density of 90.2 inhabitants per square kilometre (234/sq mi). Its population as of 1990 was 1,172; its population as of 2000 was 1,352.
