= Justo Fidel Palacios =

- Corregimiento
- Interactive map of Justo Fidel Palacios
- Location within Panama
- Coordinates: 8°17′41″N 81°31′46″W
- Country: Panama
- Province: Chiriquí
- District: Tolé
- Established: March 7, 1997

Area
  - Land: 25.8 km^{2} (10.0 sq mi)

Population (2010)
  - Total: 656
  - Density: 25.4/km^{2} (66/sq mi)
- Population density calculated based on land area.
- Time zone: UTC−5 (EST)

Justo Fidel Palacios is a corregimiento in Tolé District, Chiriquí Province, Panama. It has a land area of 25.8 square kilometres (10.0 sq mi) and had a population of 656 as of 2010, giving it a population density of 25.4 inhabitants per square kilometre (66/sq mi). It was created by Law 10 of March 7, 1997; this measure was complemented by Law 5 of January 19, 1998 and Law 69 of October 28, 1998. Its population as of 2000 was 575.
