= Breñón =

Breñon
- Corregimiento
- Interactive map of Breñon
- Location within Panama
- Coordinates: 8°37′48″N 82°49′03″W
- Country: Panama
- Province: Chiriquí
- District: Renacimiento

Area
  - Land: 35.8 km^{2} (13.8 sq mi)

Population (2010)
  - Total: 755
  - Density: 21.1/km^{2} (55/sq mi)
- Population density calculated based on land area.
- Time zone: UTC−5 (EST)

Breñon is a corregimiento in Renacimiento District, Chiriquí Province, Panama. It has a land area of 35.8 square kilometres (13.8 sq mi) and had a population of 755 as of 2010, giving it a population density of 21.1 inhabitants per square kilometre (55/sq mi). Its population as of 1990 was 532; its population as of 2000 was 648.
