= El Porvenir, Chiriquí =

El Porvenir
- Corregimiento
- Location within Panama
- Country: Panama
- Province: Chiriquí
- District: Remedios
- Established: March 7, 1997

Area
  - Land: 28.1 km^{2} (10.8 sq mi)

Population (2010)
  - Total: 1,325
  - Density: 47.1/km^{2} (122/sq mi)
- Population density calculated based on land area.
- Time zone: UTC−5 (EST)

El Porvenir is a corregimiento in Remedios District, Chiriquí Province, Panama. It has a land area of 28.1 square kilometres (10.8 sq mi) and had a population of 1,325 as of 2010, giving it a population density of 47.1 inhabitants per square kilometre (122/sq mi). It was created by Law 10 of March 7, 1997; this measure was complemented by Law 5 of January 19, 1998 and Law 69 of October 28, 1998. Its population as of 1990 was 1,152; its population as of 2000 was 999. Its population as of 2020 is 12,263, a 7.11% decrees from 2010.
