= Rincón, Chiriquí =

Coordinates: 8.4667°N 82.2833°W

Rincón
- Corregimiento
- Location within Panama
- Country: Panama
- Province: Chiriquí
- District: Gualaca

Area
  - Land: 66.3 km^{2} (25.6 sq mi)

Population (2010)
  - Total: 1,547
  - Density: 23.3/km^{2} (60/sq mi)
- Population density calculated based on land area.
- Time zone: UTC−5 (EST)

Rincón is a corregimiento in Gualaca District, Chiriquí Province, Panama. It has a land area of 66.3 square kilometres (25.6 sq mi) and had a population of 1,547 as of 2010, giving it a population density of 23.3 inhabitants per square kilometre (60/sq mi). Its population as of 1990 was 1,200; its population as of 2000 was 1,364.
