= Tolé =

- Corregimiento
- Location within Panama
- Coordinates: 8°15′0″N 81°39′36″W
- Country: Panama
- Province: Chiriquí
- District: Tolé

Area
  - Land: 76.9 km^{2} (29.7 sq mi)

Population (2010)
  - Total: 3,240
  - Density: 42.1/km^{2} (109/sq mi)
- Population density calculated based on land area.
- Time zone: UTC−5 (EST)
- Climate: Am

Tolé is a corregimiento in Tolé District, Chiriquí Province, Panama. It is the seat of Tolé District. It has a land area of 76.9 square kilometres (29.7 sq mi) and had a population of 3,240 as of 2010, giving it a population density of 42.1 inhabitants per square kilometre (109/sq mi). Its population as of 1990 was 5,292; its population as of 2000 was 3,156.
