= Rodolfo Aguilar Delgado =

- Corregimiento
- Location within Panama
- Country: Panama
- Province: Chiriquí
- District: Barú
- Established: March 7, 1997

Area
  - Land: 187.2 km^{2} (72.3 sq mi)

Population (2010)
  - Total: 15,544
  - Density: 83/km^{2} (210/sq mi)
- Population density calculated based on land area.
- Time zone: UTC−5 (EST)

Rodolfo Aguilar Delgado is a corregimiento in Barú District, Chiriquí Province, Panama. It has a land area of 187.2 square kilometres (72.3 sq mi) and had a population of 15,544 as of 2010, giving it a population density of 83 inhabitants per square kilometre (210/sq mi). It was created by Law 10 of March 7, 1997; this measure was complemented by Law 5 of January 19, 1998 and Law 69 of October 28, 1998. Its population as of 2000 was 19,644.
