= Hornito, Chiriquí =

Hornito
- Corregimiento
- Location within Panama
- Country: Panama
- Province: Chiriquí
- District: Gualaca

Area
  - Land: 179.3 km^{2} (69.2 sq mi)

Population (2010)
  - Total: 1,230
  - Density: 6.9/km^{2} (18/sq mi)
- Population density calculated based on land area.
- Time zone: UTC−5 (EST)

Hornito is a corregimiento in Gualaca District, Chiriquí Province, Panama. It has a land area of 179.3 square kilometres (69.2 sq mi) and had a population of 1,230 as of 2010, giving it a population density of 6.9 inhabitants per square kilometre (18/sq mi). Its population as of 1990 was 1,094; its population as of 2000 was 1,251.
