= Los Ángeles, Chiriquí =

Coordinates: 8.5167°N 82.2000°W

Los Ángeles
- Corregimiento
- Location within Panama
- Country: Panama
- Province: Chiriquí
- District: Gualaca

Area
  - Land: 79.9 km^{2} (30.8 sq mi)

Population (2010)
  - Total: 715
  - Density: 8.9/km^{2} (23/sq mi)
- Population density calculated based on land area.
- Time zone: UTC−5 (EST)

Los Ángeles is a corregimiento in Gualaca District, Chiriquí Province, Panama. It has a land area of 79.9 square kilometres (30.8 sq mi) and had a population of 715 as of 2010, giving it a population density of 8.9 inhabitants per square kilometre (23/sq mi). Its population as of 1990 was 617; its population as of 2000 was 666.
