= Limones, Chiriquí =

Coordinates: 8.0997°N 82.8667°W

Limones
- Corregimiento
- Location within Panama
- Country: Panama
- Province: Chiriquí
- District: Barú

Area
  - Land: 53.8 km^{2} (20.8 sq mi)

Population (2010)
  - Total: 1,040
  - Density: 19.3/km^{2} (50/sq mi)
- Population density calculated based on land area.
- Time zone: UTC−5 (EST)
- Climate: Am

Limones is a corregimiento in Barú District, Chiriquí Province, Panama. It has a land area of 53.8 square kilometres (20.8 sq mi) and had a population of 1,040 as of 2010, giving it a population density of 19.3 inhabitants per square kilometre (50/sq mi). Its population as of 1990 was 974; its population as of 2000 was 948.

== Climate ==
Limones has a tropical monsoon climate (Am) with moderate to little rainfall from December to April and heavy to very heavy rainfall from May to November.

Climate data for Limones
Month	Jan	Feb	Mar	Apr	May	Jun	Jul	Aug	Sep	Oct	Nov	Dec	Year
Mean daily maximum °C (°F)	31.8 (89.2)	32.7 (90.9)	33.4 (92.1)	33.0 (91.4)	31.6 (88.9)	30.5 (86.9)	30.7 (87.3)	30.5 (86.9)	30.1 (86.2)	29.6 (85.3)	29.7 (85.5)	30.8 (87.4)	31.2 (88.2)
Daily mean °C (°F)	26.0 (78.8)	26.4 (79.5)	27.3 (81.1)	27.5 (81.5)	27.0 (80.6)	26.1 (79.0)	26.2 (79.2)	26.0 (78.8)	25.8 (78.4)	25.4 (77.7)	25.3 (77.5)	25.6 (78.1)	26.2 (79.2)
Mean daily minimum °C (°F)	20.2 (68.4)	20.2 (68.4)	21.2 (70.2)	22.0 (71.6)	22.4 (72.3)	21.8 (71.2)	21.8 (71.2)	21.6 (70.9)	21.5 (70.7)	21.3 (70.3)	21.0 (69.8)	20.4 (68.7)	21.3 (70.3)
Average rainfall mm (inches)	40.0 (1.57)	19.8 (0.78)	42.0 (1.65)	106.7 (4.20)	268.8 (10.58)	333.3 (13.12)	287.1 (11.30)	371.0 (14.61)	511.1 (20.12)	573.2 (22.57)	359.9 (14.17)	102.7 (4.04)	3,015.6 (118.71)
Source 1: Datos Climáticos Históricos (Historical Climate Data) (rainfall)
Source 2: Climate-Data.org (temperature)
