= Santa Cruz, San Félix =

Coordinates: 8.2333°N 81.9167°W

Santa Cruz
- Corregimiento
- Location within Panama
- Country: Panama
- Province: Chiriquí
- District: San Félix
- Established: March 7, 1997

Area
  - Land: 55.7 km^{2} (21.5 sq mi)

Population (2010)
  - Total: 416
  - Density: 7.5/km^{2} (19/sq mi)
- Population density calculated based on land area.
- Time zone: UTC−5 (EST)

Santa Cruz is a corregimiento in San Félix District, Chiriquí Province, Panama. It has a land area of 55.7 square kilometres (21.5 sq mi) and had a population of 416 as of 2010, giving it a population density of 7.5 inhabitants per square kilometre (19/sq mi). It was created by Law 10 of March 7, 1997; this measure was complemented by Law 5 of January 19, 1998 and Law 69 of October 28, 1998. Its population as of 2000 was 367.
