= Guayabal, Panama =

Coordinates: 8.6167°N 82.5831°W

Guayabal
- Corregimiento
- Location within Panama
- Country: Panama
- Province: Chiriquí
- District: Boquerón

Area
  - Land: 57.6 km^{2} (22.2 sq mi)

Population (2010)
  - Total: 2,420
  - Density: 42/km^{2} (110/sq mi)
- Population density calculated based on land area.
- Time zone: UTC−5 (EST)

Guayabal is a corregimiento in Boquerón District, Chiriquí Province, Panama. It has a land area of 57.6 square kilometres (22.2 sq mi) and had a population of 2,420 as of 2023, giving it a population density of 42.0 inhabitants per square kilometre (109/sq mi). Its population as of 2010 was 2,111; its population as of 2000 was 1,797.
