= Santo Tomás, Chiriquí =

Coordinates: 8.3831°N 82.6500°W

Santo Tomás
- Corregimiento
- Location within Panama
- Country: Panama
- Province: Chiriquí
- District: Alanje

Area
  - Land: 56.4 km^{2} (21.8 sq mi)

Population (2023)
  - Total: 1,511
  - Density: 26.8/km^{2} (69/sq mi)
- Population density calculated based on land area.
- Time zone: UTC−5 (EST)

Santo Tomás is a corregimiento in Alanje District, Chiriquí Province, Panama. It has a land area of 56.4 square kilometres (21.8 sq mi) and had a population of 1,511 as of 2023, giving it a population density of 26.8 inhabitants per square kilometre (69/sq mi). Its population as of 2010 was 1,259; its population as of 2000 was 840.
