= San Félix, Chiriquí =

San Félix
- Corregimiento
- Location in Panama
- Coordinates: 8°16′59.98″N 81°52′0.12″W
- Country: Panama
- Province: Chiriquí
- District: San Félix

Area
  - Land: 55.7 km^{2} (21.5 sq mi)

Population (2010)
  - Total: 2,972
  - Density: 53.4/km^{2} (138/sq mi)
- Population density calculated based on land area.
- Time zone: UTC−5 (EST)

San Félix is a corregimiento in San Félix District, Chiriquí Province, Panama. It has a land area of 55.7 square kilometres (21.5 sq mi) and had a population of 2,972 as of 2010, giving it a population density of 53.4 inhabitants per square kilometre (138/sq mi). Its population as of 1990 was 1,680; its population as of 2000 was 2,443.
