= Los Anastacios =

- Corregimiento
- Location within Panama
- Coordinates: 8°31′48″N 82°25′12″W
- Country: Panama
- Province: Chiriquí
- District: Dolega

Area
  - Land: 10.8 km^{2} (4.2 sq mi)

Population (2010)
  - Total: 3,236
  - Density: 298.9/km^{2} (774/sq mi)
- Population density calculated based on land area.
- Time zone: UTC−5 (EST)

Los Anastacios is a corregimiento in Dolega District, Chiriquí Province, Panama. It has a land area of 10.8 square kilometres (4.2 sq mi) and had a population of 3,236 as of 2010, giving it a population density of 298.9 inhabitants per square kilometre (774/sq mi). Its population as of 1990 was 2,170; its population as of 2000 was 2,679.
