= Boca del Monte =

Coordinates: 8.3500°N 82.1167°W

- Corregimiento
- Location within Panama
- Country: Panama
- Province: Chiriquí
- District: San Lorenzo

Area
  - Land: 243.8 km^{2} (94.1 sq mi)

Population (2010)
  - Total: 2,143
  - Density: 8.8/km^{2} (23/sq mi)
- Population density calculated based on land area.
- Time zone: UTC−5 (EST)

Boca del Monte is a corregimiento in San Lorenzo District, Chiriquí Province, Panama. It has a land area of 243.8 square kilometres (94.1 sq mi) and had a population of 2,143 as of 2010, giving it a population density of 8.8 inhabitants per square kilometre (23/sq mi). Its population as of 1990 was 1,539; its population as of 2000 was 1,990.
