= Paja de Sombrero =

Coordinates: 8.6833°N 82.3167°W

- Corregimiento
- Location within Panama
- Country: Panama
- Province: Chiriquí
- District: Gualaca

Area
  - Land: 62.7 km^{2} (24.2 sq mi)

Population (2010)
  - Total: 653
  - Density: 10.4/km^{2} (27/sq mi)
- Population density calculated based on land area.
- Time zone: UTC−5 (EST)

Paja de Sombrero is a corregimiento in Gualaca District, Chiriquí Province, Panama. It has a land area of 62.7 square kilometres (24.2 sq mi) and had a population of 653 as of 2010, giving it a population density of 10.4 inhabitants per square kilometre (27/sq mi). Its population as of 1990 was 670; its population as of 2000 was 637.
