= Potrero de Caña =

- Corregimiento
- Location within Panama
- Coordinates: 8.295°N 81.701°W
- Country: Panama
- Province: Chiriquí
- District: Tolé

Area
  - Land: 20.1 km^{2} (7.8 sq mi)

Population (2010)
  - Total: 337
  - Density: 16.8/km^{2} (44/sq mi)
- Population density calculated based on land area.
- Time zone: UTC−5 (EST)

Potrero de Caña is a corregimiento in Tolé District, Chiriquí Province, Panama. It has a land area of 20.1 square kilometres (7.8 sq mi) and had a population of 337 as of 2010, giving it a population density of 16.8 inhabitants per square kilometre (44/sq mi). Its population as of 1990 was 1,751; its population as of 2000 was 458.
