= San Pablo Nuevo =

Coordinates: 8.4167°N 82.5167°W

- Corregimiento
- Location within Panama
- Country: Panama
- Province: Chiriquí
- District: David

Area
  - Land: 59 km^{2} (23 sq mi)

Population (2010)
  - Total: 1,752
  - Density: 29.7/km^{2} (77/sq mi)
- Population density calculated based on land area.
- Time zone: UTC−5 (EST)

San Pablo Nuevo is a corregimiento in David District, Chiriquí Province, Panama. It has a land area of 59 square kilometres (23 sq mi) and had a population of 1,752 as of 2010, giving it a population density of 29.7 inhabitants per square kilometre (77/sq mi). Its population as of 1990 was 1,192; its population as of 2000 was 1,642.
