= Querévalo =

- Village and corregimiento
- Location within Panama
- Coordinates: 8°22′N 82°31′W
- Country: Panama
- Province: Chiriquí
- District: Alanje

Area
  - Land: 36.7 km^{2} (14.2 sq mi)

Population (2023)
  - Total: 2,006
  - Density: 54.7/km^{2} (142/sq mi)
- Population density calculated based on land area.
- Time zone: UTC−5 (EST)

Querévalo is a village and corregimiento in Alanje District, Chiriquí Province, Panama. It is located near Canas Blancas, on both banks of the Río Chico or Stone. It has a land area of 36.7 square kilometres (14.2 sq mi) and had a population of 2,006 as of 2023, giving it a population density of 54.7 inhabitants per square kilometre (142/sq mi). Its population as of 2010 was 1,751; its population as of 2000 was 1,536.

Within the township there are 2 elementary schools, one of which is located in the Querévalo header and one in River Edge, a Corregiduría, 2 Public Health Post, among other infrastructure. The water system is based on deep wells, which are administered by township residents through health committees.

The main economic activities are agriculture site and livestock, these being segmented according to the location of the territory (left or right margin of the Río Chico).
