= San Lorenzo, Chiriquí =

Coordinates: 8.3000°N 82.1000°W

San Lorenzo
- Corregimiento
- Location within Panama
- Country: Panama
- Province: Chiriquí
- District: San Lorenzo

Area
  - Land: 136.8 km^{2} (52.8 sq mi)

Population (2010)
  - Total: 2,290
  - Density: 16.7/km^{2} (43/sq mi)
- Population density calculated based on land area.
- Time zone: UTC−5 (EST)

San Lorenzo is a corregimiento in San Lorenzo District, Chiriquí Province, Panama. It has a land area of 136.8 square kilometres (52.8 sq mi) and had a population of 2,290 as of 2010, giving it a population density of 16.7 inhabitants per square kilometre (43/sq mi). Its population as of 1990 was 1,621; its population as of 2000 was 1,772.
