= Dolega, Chiriquí =

Dolega
- Corregimiento
- San Francisco de Dolega
- Interactive map of Dolega
- Location within Panama
- Coordinates: 8°34′N 82°25′W
- Country: Panama
- Province: Chiriquí
- District: Dolega

Area
  - Land: 26.8 km^{2} (10.3 sq mi)

Population (2010)
  - Total: 4,074
  - Density: 152.1/km^{2} (394/sq mi)
- Population density calculated based on land area.
- Time zone: UTC−5 (EST)

Dolega is a corregimiento in Dolega District, Chiriquí Province, Panama. It is the seat of Dolega District. It has a land area of 26.8 square kilometres (10.3 sq mi) and had a population of 4,074 as of 2010, giving it a population density of 152.1 inhabitants per square kilometre (394/sq mi). Its population as of 1990 was 5,256; its population as of 2000 was 7,516.
