= Potrerillos Abajo =

- Town and corregimiento
- Location within Panama
- Coordinates: 8°39′0″N 82°28′48″W
- Country: Panama
- Province: Chiriquí
- District: Dolega

Area
  - Land: 33.8 km^{2} (13.1 sq mi)

Population (2010)
  - Total: 1,815
  - Density: 53.6/km^{2} (139/sq mi)
- Population density calculated based on land area.
- Time zone: UTC−5 (EST)

Potrerillos Abajo is a town and corregimiento in Dolega District, Chiriquí Province, Panama. It has a land area of 33.8 square kilometres (13.1 sq mi) and had a population of 1,815 as of 2010, giving it a population density of 53.6 inhabitants per square kilometre (139/sq mi). Its population as of 1990 was 980; its population as of 2000 was 1,378.

The name "Potrerillos" means "Little Pastures," and is derived from the numerous stone walls built by the indigenous population several centuries ago. The walls were constructed through forced labor under the direction of Spanish settlers to form pastures for the settlers' cattle. The area of Potrerillos is divided into two towns, Potrerillos Arriba and Potrerillos Abajo, with Arriba and Abajo meaning "upper" and "lower," respectively. Both towns are near the city of David and the mountain Volcán Barú.
