= San Félix District =

- District

- Location of the district capital in Panama
- Coordinates: 8°16′40″N 81°52′26″W
- Country: Panama
- Province: Chiriquí Province
- Capital: Las Lajas

Area
  - Total: 87.4 sq mi (226.3 km^{2})

Population (2023)
  - Total: 6,881
- Time zone: UTC-5 (ETZ)

San Félix District is a district in the Chiriquí Province of Panama. It covers an area of 226.3 km^{2} (87.4 sq mi) and had a population of 6,881 inhabitants as per the 2023 census. Las Lajas serves as the capital of the district.

== History ==
The region was a flat plain on the banks of the San Felix river, which was inhabited by Yela Indians. The first Europeans settled on the Las Lajas area. San Félix was founded in the early 17th century by Cristóbal Cacho de Santillan, on the orders of Francisco de Valverde and Mercado, then Spanish Royal Governor of Panama. It was constituted as a district in 1855. In 1876, the region was affected by smallpox, which led to a decline in population. The area was re-populated in the early 20th century, and Las Lajas became the capital of the district in 1918.

== Geography ==
San Félix District is one of the 82 districts of Panama. It forms part of the Chiriquí province. It is spread over an area of 5,226.3 km^{2} (2,017.9 sq mi). The district experiences a tropical climate.

The district has a mountainous terrain with several hilly formations. There are significant mineral deposits, majorly copper ore. Several rivers flow through the district, including San Félix, Juay, Dupí, Chivre, Galique, San Juan and Piedra. There are several beaches along the coast and hot springs.

== Administration and politics ==
San Félix District has its capital at the city of Las Lajas. The district is divided administratively into the following corregimientos–Las Lajas, Juay, San Félix, Lajas Adentro, and Santa Cruz.

The National Assembly of Panama has 71 members, who are elected directly from single and multi-member constituencies. The district forms part of the Chiriquí Province, which elects three members to the National Assembly. The district forms part of the Chiriquí Province, which has seven electoral circuits, and elects 11 members to the National Assembly.

== Demographics ==
As per the 2023 census, San Félix District had a population of 6,881 inhabitants. The population increased from 6,304 in the 2010 census. The population consisted of 3,472 males and 3,409 females. About 1,725 (25.1%) of the inhabitants were below the age of 14 years and 885 inhabitants (12.9%) were above the age of 65 years. About 81.7% of the population was classified as rural and the rest (18.3%) as urban. Non-indigenous, non-Afro-descendant people (57.9%) formed the largest ethnic group in the district, followed by Ngäbe people (27.9%) and Afro-descendant people (11.9%).
