= Paraíso, Chiriquí =

Coordinates: 8.6667°N 82.5667°W

Paraíso
- Corregimiento
- Location within Panama
- Country: Panama
- Province: Chiriquí
- District: Boquerón

Area
  - Land: 36.4 km^{2} (14.1 sq mi)

Population (2023)
  - Total: 683
  - Density: 18.8/km^{2} (49/sq mi)
- Population density calculated based on land area.
- Time zone: UTC−5 (EST)

Paraíso is a corregimiento in Boquerón District, Chiriquí Province, Panama. It has a land area of 36.4 square kilometres (14.1 sq mi) and had a population of 683 as of 2023, giving it a population density of 18.8 inhabitants per square kilometre (49/sq mi). Its population as of 2010 was 429; its population as of 2000 was 248.
