= El Nancito =

Coordinates: 8.2333°N 81.7333°W

- Corregimiento
- Location within Panama
- Country: Panama
- Province: Chiriquí
- District: Remedios

Area
  - Land: 35.4 km^{2} (13.7 sq mi)

Population (2010)
  - Total: 607
  - Density: 17.1/km^{2} (44/sq mi)
- Population density calculated based on land area.
- Time zone: UTC−5 (EST)

El Nancito is a corregimiento in Remedios District, Chiriquí Province, Panama. It has a land area of 35.4 square kilometres (13.7 sq mi) and had a population of 607 as of 2010, giving it a population density of 17.1 inhabitants per square kilometre (44/sq mi). Its population as of 1990 was 786; its population as of 2000 was 519.
