= Bajo Boquete =

- Corregimiento
- Location within Panama
- Coordinates: 8.777190555356114°N 82.4484703669892°W
- Country: Panama
- Province: Chiriquí
- District: Boquete

Area
  - Land: 18.2 km^{2} (7.0 sq mi)

Population (2010)
  - Total: 4,493
  - Density: 246.5/km^{2} (638/sq mi)
- Population density calculated based on land area.
- Time zone: UTC−5 (EST)

Bajo Boquete is a corregimiento in Boquete District, Chiriquí Province, Panama. It is the seat of Boquete District. It has a land area of 18.2 square kilometres (7.0 sq mi) and had a population of 4,493 as of 2010, giving it a population density of 246.5 inhabitants per square kilometre (638/sq mi). Its population as of 1990 was 10,908; its population as of 2000 was 3,833.

== See also ==
- Boquete, Chiriquí
