= Lajas Adentro =

Coordinates: 8.2530°N 81.8789°W

- Corregimiento
- Location within Panama
- Country: Panama
- Province: Chiriquí
- District: San Félix
- Established: March 7, 1997

Area
  - Land: 19.6 km^{2} (7.6 sq mi)

Population (2010)
  - Total: 741
  - Density: 37.9/km^{2} (98/sq mi)
- Population density calculated based on land area.
- Time zone: UTC−5 (EST)

Lajas Adentro is a corregimiento in San Félix District, Chiriquí Province, Panama. It has a land area of 19.6 square kilometres (7.6 sq mi) and had a population of 741 as of 2010, giving it a population density of 37.9 inhabitants per square kilometre (98/sq mi). It was created by Law 10 of March 7, 1997; this measure was complemented by Law 5 of January 19, 1998 and Law 69 of October 28, 1998. Its population as of 2000 was 718.
