= Quebrada de Piedra =

Coordinates: 8.1000°N 81.6833°W

- Corregimiento
- Location within Panama
- Country: Panama
- Province: Chiriquí
- District: Tolé

Area
  - Land: 98.3 km^{2} (38.0 sq mi)

Population (2010)
  - Total: 1,127
  - Density: 11.5/km^{2} (30/sq mi)
- Population density calculated based on land area.
- Time zone: UTC−5 (EST)

Quebrada de Piedra is a corregimiento in Tolé District, Chiriquí Province, Panama. It has a land area of 98.3 square kilometres (38.0 sq mi) and had a population of 1,127 as of 2010, giving it a population density of 11.5 inhabitants per square kilometre (30/sq mi). Its population as of 1990 was 1,197; its population as of 2000 was 1,209.
