= Plaza de Caisán =

Plaza Caisán
- Corregimiento
- Location within Panama
- Coordinates: 8°43′48″N 82°49′12″W
- Country: Panama
- Province: Chiriquí
- District: Renacimiento

Area
  - Land: 96.1 km^{2} (37.1 sq mi)

Population (2010)
  - Total: 2,901
  - Density: 30.2/km^{2} (78/sq mi)
- Population density calculated based on land area.
- Time zone: UTC−5 (EST)

Plaza Caisán is a corregimiento in Renacimiento District, Chiriquí Province, Panama. It has a land area of 96.1 square kilometres (37.1 sq mi) and had a population of 2,901 as of 2010, giving it a population density of 30.2 inhabitants per square kilometre (78/sq mi). Its population as of 1990 was 1,927; its population as of 2000 was 2,201.
