= Alanje District =

- District

- Location of the district capital in Panama
- Coordinates: 8°24′0″N 82°32′24″W
- Country: Panama
- Province: Chiriquí Province
- Capital: Alanje

Area
  - Total: 175.8 sq mi (455.2 km^{2})

Population (2023)
  - Total: 18,877
- Time zone: UTC-5 (ETZ)

Alanje District is a district in the Chiriquí Province of Panama. It covers an area of 455.2 km^{2} (175.8 sq mi) and has a population of 18,877 inhabitants as per the 2023 census. It is one of the oldest districts in existence in Panama, having been founded in 1591. The city of Alanje (Santiago de Alanje) serves as the capital of the district.

== Geography ==
Alanje District is one of the 82 districts of Panama, and forms part of the Chiriquí Province. It is spread over an area of 455.2 km^{2} (175.8 sq mi).

Several rivers including Chico, Escarrea, Chirigagua, and Duablo flow through the district. The Chiriquí Viejo River forms the natural boundary with the nearby Barú District. The district is largely made up of flat topography and consists of floodplains with rich alluvium, which supports crops such as rice, maize, pulses, and fruits. Sugercane grown in the region is used to make rum at the Carta Vieja distillery. Other economic activities include livestock farming, fishing, and tourism. There are several beaches along the coast, and the Playa La Barqueta, designated a Wildlife Refuge in 1994, is a known sea turtle nesting area.

== Administration and politics ==
Alanje District is one of the oldest districts in existence in Panama, having been founded in 1591. The city of Alanje (Santiago de Alanje) serves as the capital of the district. It is divided administratively into the following corregimientos–Santiago de Alanje, Canta Gallo, Divalá, El Tejar, Guarumal, Nuevo México, Palo Grande, Querévalo, and Santo Tomás.

The National Assembly of Panama has 71 members, who are elected directly from single and multi-member constituencies. The district forms part of the Chiriquí Province, which elects three members to the National Assembly. The district forms part of the Chiriquí Province, which has seven electoral circuits, and elects 11 members to the National Assembly.

== Demographics ==
As per the 2023 census, Alanje District had a population of 18,877 inhabitants. The population increased from 16,508 in the 2010 census. The population consisted of 9,782 males and 9,095 females. About 5,135 (27.2%) of the inhabitants were below the age of 14 years and 1,935 inhabitants (10.2%) were above the age of 65 years. The majority (87.1%) of the population was classified as rural while the remaining 12.9% was classified as urban. Non-indigenous, non-Afro descendant people (41.7%) formed the largest ethnic group in the district, followed by Afro-descendant people (32.6%) and the Ngäbe people (24.9%).
