= Nuevo México, Chiriquí =

Coordinates: 8.4042°N 82.7453°W

Nuevo México
- Corregimiento
- Location within Panama
- Country: Panama
- Province: Chiriquí
- District: Alanje
- Established: April 30, 2003

Area
  - Land: 74.0 km^{2} (28.6 sq mi)

Population (2023)
  - Total: 2,497
  - Density: 28.9/km^{2} (75/sq mi)
- Population density calculated based on land area.
- Time zone: UTC−5 (EST)

Nuevo México (Spanish pronunciation: [ˈnweβo ˈmexiko]) is a corregimiento in Alanje District, Chiriquí Province, Panama. It has a land area of 74.0 square kilometres (28.6 sq mi) and had a population of 2,497 as of 2023, giving it a population density of 28.9 inhabitants per square kilometre (75/sq mi). It was created by Law 41 of April 30, 2003. The name of the subdivision references both the country of Mexico and the U.S. state of New Mexico.
