= San Carlos, Chiriquí =

Coordinates: 8.5167°N 82.5000°W

San Carlos
- Corregimiento
- Location within Panama
- Country: Panama
- Province: Chiriquí
- District: David

Area
  - Land: 44.7 km^{2} (17.3 sq mi)

Population (2010)
  - Total: 4,487
  - Density: 100.4/km^{2} (260/sq mi)
- Population density calculated based on land area.
- Time zone: UTC−5 (EST)

San Carlos is a corregimiento in David District, Chiriquí Province, Panama. It has a land area of 44.7 square kilometres (17.3 sq mi) and had a population of 4,487 as of 2010, giving it a population density of 100.4 inhabitants per square kilometre (260/sq mi). Its population as of 1990 was 2,543; its population as of 2000 was 3,181.
