= Rovira, Chiriquí =

Coordinates: 8.6333°N 82.5000°W

Rovira
- Corregimiento
- Location within Panama
- Country: Panama
- Province: Chiriquí
- District: Dolega

Area
  - Land: 46.4 km^{2} (17.9 sq mi)

Population (2010)
  - Total: 1,925
  - Density: 41.5/km^{2} (107/sq mi)
- Population density calculated based on land area.
- Time zone: UTC−5 (EST)

Rovira is a corregimiento in Dolega District, Chiriquí Province, Panama. It has a land area of 46.4 square kilometres (17.9 sq mi) and had a population of 1,925 in 2010, giving it a population density of 41.5 inhabitants per square kilometre (107/sq mi). The population was 1,380 in 1990 and 1,703 in 2000.
