= Progreso, Chiriquí =

Coordinates: 8.4514°N 82.8361°W

Progreso
- Corregimiento
- Location within Panama
- Country: Panama
- Province: Chiriquí
- District: Barú
- Established: 1915

Area
  - Land: 55.6 km^{2} (21.5 sq mi)

Population (2010)
  - Total: 11,402
  - Density: 205/km^{2} (530/sq mi)
- Population density calculated based on land area.
- Time zone: UTC−5 (EST)
- Climate: Af

Progreso is a corregimiento in Barú District, Chiriquí Province, Panama. It has a land area of 55.6 square kilometres (21.5 sq mi) and had a population of 11,402 as of 2010, giving it a population density of 205 inhabitants per square kilometre (530/sq mi). Its population as of 1990 was 13,107; its population as of 2000 was 10,103. Its inhabitants are mainly engaged in planting and harvesting Rice.
