= Solano, Chiriquí =

Solano
- Corregimiento
- Country: Panama
- Provinces: Chiriquí
- District: Bugaba
- Time zone: UTC−5 (EST)

Solano is a corregimiento in Chiriquí Province in the Republic of Panama.
