= Barú District =

Barú District may refer to:

- Barú District, Chiriquí, in Chiriquí, Panama
- Barú District, Pérez Zeledón, in Pérez Zeledón Canton, San José province, Costa Rica
