= Boquerón District =

- District

- Location of the district capital in Panama
- Coordinates: 8°30′0″N 82°33′36″W
- Country: Panama
- Province: Chiriquí Province
- Capital: Boquerón

Area
  - Total: 115.1 sq mi (298.2 km^{2})

Population (2000)
  - Total: 12,275
- Time zone: UTC-5 (ETZ)

Boquerón District is a district in the Chiriquí Province of Panama. It covers an area of 298.2 km^{2} (115.1 sq mi) and has a population of 21,001 inhabitants as per the 2023 census. The district was established in 1855, with its capital at the city of Boquerón.

== Geography ==
Boquerón District is one of the 82 districts of Panama. It is part of the Chiriquí Province. It is spread over an area of 298.2 km^{2} (115.1 sq mi).

In 2020, the district had 6,700 hectares of natural forest, covering about 23% of its land area. The Volcan Baru National Park covers part of the district, and the Chorro Bonco waterfall, is located on the Chuspa river, close to its origin, at an altitude of 1,400 m (4,600 ft).

== Administration and politics ==
Boquerón District was established in 1855, with its capital at the city of Boquerón. It is divided administratively into the following corregimientos–Boquerón, Bágala, Cordillera, Guabal, Guayabal, Paraíso, Pedregal, and Tijeras.

The National Assembly of Panama has 71 members, who are elected directly from single and multi-member constituencies. The district forms part of the Chiriquí Province, which elects three members to the National Assembly. The district forms part of the Chiriquí Province, which has seven electoral circuits, and elects 11 members to the National Assembly.

== Demographics and economy ==
As per the 2023 census, Boquerón District had a population of 21,001 inhabitants. The population increased from 15,029 in the 2010 census. The population consisted of 10,505 males and 10,496 females. About 5,235 (24.9%) of the inhabitants were below the age of 14 years and 2,049 inhabitants (9.7%) were above the age of 65 years. The majority (88.7%) of the population was classified as urban while the remaining 11.3% was classified as rural. Non-indigenous, non-Afro-descendant people (72.2%) formed the largest ethnic group in the district, followed by Afro-descendant people (17.1%) and Ngäbe people (9.4%).

The economy of the district is dependent on agriculture, which includes fruit and vegetable cultivation, and livestock and the associated dairy industry.
