= Bella Vista, Chiriquí =

Bella Vista
- Corregimiento
- Interactive map of Bella Vista
- Location within Panama
- Coordinates: 8°11′29″N 81°36′34″W
- Country: Panama
- Province: Chiriquí
- District: Tolé
- Established: March 7, 1997

Area
  - Land: 38 km^{2} (15 sq mi)

Population (2010)
  - Total: 683
  - Density: 18/km^{2} (47/sq mi)
- Population density calculated based on land area.
- Time zone: UTC−5 (EST)

Bella Vista is a corregimiento in Tolé District, Chiriquí Province, Panama. It has a land area of 38 square kilometres (15 sq mi) and had a population of 683 as of 2010, giving it a population density of 18 inhabitants per square kilometre (47/sq mi). It was created by Law 10 of March 7, 1997; this measure was complemented by Law 5 of January 19, 1998 and Law 69 of October 28, 1998. Its population as of 2000 was 677.
