= Guabal, Panama =

Coordinates: 8.5831°N 82.5331°W

Guabal
- Corregimiento
- Location within Panama
- Country: Panama
- Province: Chiriquí
- District: Boquerón

Area
  - Land: 32.4 km^{2} (12.5 sq mi)

Population (2023)
  - Total: 1,126
  - Density: 34.8/km^{2} (90/sq mi)
- Population density calculated based on land area.
- Time zone: UTC−5 (EST)

Guabal is a corregimiento in Boquerón District, Chiriquí Province, Panama. It has a land area of 32.4 square kilometres (12.5 sq mi) and had a population of 1,126 as of 2023, giving it a population density of 34.8 inhabitants per square kilometre (90/sq mi). Its population as of 2010 was 884; its population as of 2000 was 649.
