= Guarumal, Chiriquí =

Guarumal
- Corregimiento
- Location within Panama
- Coordinates: 8°21′0″N 82°31′48″W
- Country: Panama
- Province: Chiriquí
- District: Alanje

Area
  - Land: 91.4 km^{2} (35.3 sq mi)

Population (2023)
  - Total: 2,743
  - Density: 30/km^{2} (78/sq mi)
- Population density calculated based on land area.
- Time zone: UTC−5 (EST)

Guarumal is a corregimiento in Alanje District, Chiriquí Province, Panama. It has a land area of 91.4 square kilometres (35.3 sq mi) and had a population of 2,743 as of 2023, giving it a population density of 30.0 inhabitants per square kilometre (78/sq mi). Its population as of 2010 was 2,418; its population as of 2000 was 2,092.
