= Santa Lucía, Chiriquí =

Santa Lucia
- Corregimiento
- Location within Panama
- Country: Panama
- Province: Chiriquí
- District: Remedios
- Established: March 7, 1997

Area
  - Land: 25.3 km^{2} (9.8 sq mi)

Population (2010)
  - Total: 492
  - Density: 19.4/km^{2} (50/sq mi)
- Population density calculated based on land area.
- Time zone: UTC−5 (EST)

Santa Lucia is a corregimiento in Remedios District, Chiriquí Province, Panama. It has a land area of 25.3 square kilometres (9.8 sq mi) and had a population of 492 as of 2010, giving it a population density of 19.4 inhabitants per square kilometre (50/sq mi). It was created by Law 10 of March 7, 1997; this measure was complemented by Law 5 of January 19, 1998 and Law 69 of October 28, 1998. Its population as of 2000 was 533.
