= El Tejar, Chiriquí =

Coordinates: 8.4319°N 82.5556°W

El Tejar
- Corregimiento
- Location within Panama
- Country: Panama
- Province: Chiriquí
- District: Alanje

Area
  - Land: 35.4 km^{2} (13.7 sq mi)

Population (2023)
  - Total: 2,113
  - Density: 59.7/km^{2} (155/sq mi)
- Population density calculated based on land area.
- Time zone: UTC−5 (EST)

El Tejar is a corregimiento in Alanje District, Chiriquí Province, Panama. It has a land area of 35.4 square kilometres (13.7 sq mi) and had a population of 2,113 as of 2023, giving it a population density of 59.7 inhabitants per square kilometre (155/sq mi). Its population as of 2010 was 1,961; its population as of 2000 was 1,507.
