= Palo Grande =

Coordinates: 8.3331°N 82.5986°W

- Corregimiento
- Location within Panama
- Country: Panama
- Province: Chiriquí
- District: Alanje

Area
  - Land: 41.0 km^{2} (15.8 sq mi)

Population (2023)
  - Total: 642
  - Density: 15.7/km^{2} (41/sq mi)
- Population density calculated based on land area.
- Time zone: UTC−5 (EST)

Palo Grande is a corregimiento in Alanje District, Chiriquí Province, Panama. It has a land area of 41.0 square kilometres (15.8 sq mi) and had a population of 642 as of 2023, giving it a population density of 15.7 inhabitants per square kilometre (41/sq mi). Its population as of 2010 was 578; its population as of 2000 was 563.
