= Lajas de Tolé =

Coordinates: 8.1702°N 81.7007°W

- Corregimiento
- Location within Panama
- Country: Panama
- Province: Chiriquí
- District: Tolé

Area
  - Land: 81.3 km^{2} (31.4 sq mi)

Population (2010)
  - Total: 847
  - Density: 10.4/km^{2} (27/sq mi)
- Population density calculated based on land area.
- Time zone: UTC−5 (EST)

Lajas de Tolé is a corregimiento in Tolé District, Chiriquí Province, Panama. It has a land area of 81.3 square kilometres (31.4 sq mi) and had a population of 847 as of 2010, giving it a population density of 10.4 inhabitants per square kilometre (27/sq mi). Its population as of 1990 was 906; its population as of 2000 was 850.
