= Alanje =

- Corregimiento
- Interactive map of Alanje
- Location within Panama
- Coordinates: 8°24′0″N 82°32′24″W
- Country: Panama
- Province: Chiriquí
- District: Alanje

Area
  - Land: 20.8 km^{2} (8.0 sq mi)

Population (2023)
  - Total: 3,168
  - Density: 153.2/km^{2} (397/sq mi)
- Population density calculated based on land area.
- Time zone: UTC−5 (EST)
- Climate: Am

Alanje is a corregimiento in Alanje District, Chiriquí Province, Panama. It is the seat of Alanje District. It has a land area of 21.4 square kilometres (8.3 sq mi) and had a population of 3,168 as of 2023, giving it a population density of 153.2 inhabitants per square kilometre (397/sq mi). Its population as of 2010 was 2,406; its population as of 2000 was 2,703.
