= Canta Gallo =

Coordinates: 8.4042°N 82.7453°W

- Corregimiento
- Location within Panama
- Country: Panama
- Province: Chiriquí
- District: Alanje
- Established: April 30, 2003

Area
  - Land: 38.1 km^{2} (14.7 sq mi)

Population (2023)
  - Total: 683
  - Density: 17.9/km^{2} (46/sq mi)
- Population density calculated based on land area.
- Time zone: UTC−5 (EST)

Canta Gallo is a corregimiento in Alanje District, Chiriquí Province, Panama. It has a land area of 38.1 square kilometres (14.7 sq mi) and had a population of 683 as of 2023, giving it a population density of 17.9 inhabitants per square kilometre (46/sq mi). It was created by Law 41 of April 30, 2003.
