= Cañas Gordas =

Coordinates: 8.7333°N 82.9000°W

- Corregimiento
- Location within Panama
- Country: Panama
- Province: Chiriquí
- District: Renacimiento

Area
  - Land: 60.8 km^{2} (23.5 sq mi)

Population (2010)
  - Total: 3,090
  - Density: 50.8/km^{2} (132/sq mi)
- Population density calculated based on land area.
- Time zone: UTC−5 (EST)

Cañas Gordas is a corregimiento in Renacimiento District, Chiriquí Province, Panama. It has a land area of 60.8 square kilometres (23.5 sq mi) and had a population of 3,090 as of 2010, giving it a population density of 50.8 inhabitants per square kilometre (132/sq mi). Its population as of 1990 was 2,448; its population as of 2000 was 2,682.
