= San Isidro, Chiriqui =

Corregimiento in Bugaba, Chiriquí, Panama

San Isidro
- Corregimiento
- Country: Panama
- Province: Chiriquí
- District: Bugaba
- Established: 2018

Area
  - Land: 47.1 km^{2} (18.2 sq mi)

Population (2023)
  - Total: 6,629
  - Density: 140.8/km^{2} (365/sq mi)
- Population density calculated based on land area.
- Time zone: UTC−5 (EST)

San Isidro is a corregimiento in Bugaba District, Chiriquí Province, Panama. It has a land area of 47.1 square kilometres (18.2 sq mi) and had a population of 6,629 as of 2023, giving it a population density of 140.8 inhabitants per square kilometre (365/sq mi).
