= Cordillera, Chiriquí =

Coordinates: 8.6972°N 82.5997°W

Cordillera
- Corregimiento
- Location within Panama
- Country: Panama
- Province: Chiriquí
- District: Boquerón

Area
  - Land: 48.8 km^{2} (18.8 sq mi)

Population (2023)
  - Total: 483
  - Density: 9.9/km^{2} (26/sq mi)
- Population density calculated based on land area.
- Time zone: UTC−5 (EST)

Cordillera is a corregimiento, a subdivision of a district, in Boquerón District, Chiriquí Province, Panama. It has a land area of 48.8 square kilometres (18.8 sq mi) and had a population of 483 as of 2023, giving it a population density of 9.9 inhabitants per square kilometre (26/sq mi). Its population as of 2010 was 590; its population as of 2000 was 471.
