= Dominical, Chiriquí =

Coordinates: 8.6667°N 82.8000°W

Dominical
- Corregimiento
- Location within Panama
- Country: Panama
- Province: Chiriquí
- District: Renacimiento
- Established: April 30, 2003

Area
  - Land: 82.5 km^{2} (31.9 sq mi)

Population (2010)
  - Total: 998
  - Density: 12.1/km^{2} (31/sq mi)
- Population density calculated based on land area.
- Time zone: UTC−5 (EST)

Dominical is a corregimiento in Renacimiento District, Chiriquí Province, Panama. It has a land area of 82.5 square kilometres (31.9 sq mi) and had a population of 998 as of 2010, giving it a population density of 12.1 inhabitants per square kilometre (31/sq mi). It was created by Law 41 of April 30, 2003.
