= Pedregal, David =

Pedregal
- Corregimiento
- Location within Panama
- Country: Panama
- Province: Chiriquí
- District: David

Area
  - Land: 144.4 km^{2} (55.8 sq mi)

Population (2010)
  - Total: 17,516
  - Density: 121.3/km^{2} (314/sq mi)
- Population density calculated based on land area.
- Time zone: UTC−5 (EST)

Pedregal is a corregimiento in David District, Chiriquí Province, Panama. It has a land area of 144.4 square kilometres (55.8 sq mi) and had a population of 17,516 as of 2010, giving it a population density of 121.3 inhabitants per square kilometre (314/sq mi). Its population as of 1990 was 12,731; its population as of 2000 was 15,220.
