= David District =

- District

- Location of the district capital in Panama
- Coordinates: 8°26′N 82°26′W
- Country: Panama
- Province: Chiriquí Province
- Capital: David

Area
  - Total: 344.6 sq mi (892.4 km^{2})

Population (2023)
  - Total: 156,498
- Time zone: UTC-5 (ETZ)

David District is a district in the Chiriquí Province of Panama. It covers an area of 892.4 km^{2} (344.6 sq mi) and has a population of 156,498 inhabitants as per the 2023 census. Its capital is the city of David, which is a major commercial centre in the Gulf of Chiriquí.

== History ==
Prior to the 17th century, the region was inhabited by indigenous people and was known as San Jose de David de Dolega. The city of David was founded in 1602 by the Spanish colonial settlers, and was developed as an agricultural center. A gold prospecting camp was established in 1738. After Panama's independence from Spain in 1821, the city became an administrative and commercial hub in the region, and the David District was established in 1863.

== Geography ==
David District is one of the 82 districts of Panama. It is part of the Chiriquí Province. It is spread over an area of 892.4 km^{2} (344.6 sq mi).

== Administration and politics ==
The city of David, the second largest city in Panama, serves as the capital of the district. The district is divided administratively into the twelve corregimientos–David, Bijagual, Cochea, Chiriquí, Guacá, Las Lomas, Pedregal, San Carlos, San Pablo Nuevo, San Pablo Viejo, David Este, and David Sur. The corregimientos of David Este and David Sur were split from the corregimiento of David as per Law nine enacted on 14 February 2018.

The National Assembly of Panama has 71 members, who are elected directly from single and multi-member constituencies. The district forms part of the Chiriquí Province, which elects three members to the National Assembly. The district forms part of the Chiriquí Province, which has seven electoral circuits, and elects 11 members to the National Assembly.

== Demographics and economy ==
As per the 2023 census, David District had a population of 156,498 inhabitants. The population increased from 144,858 in the 2010 census. The population consisted of 76,449 males and 80,049 females. About 32,944 (21.1%) of the inhabitants were below the age of 14 years and 19,553 inhabitants (12.5%) were above the age of 65 years. The majority (83%) of the population was classified as urban while the remaining 17% was classified as rural. Non-indigenous, non-Afro-descendant people (74.9%) formed the largest ethnic group in the district, followed by Afro-descendant people (16.6%) and Ngäbe people (8.1%).

David is an important commercial centre located on the Gulf of Chiriquí and supports several industries such as meatpacking, food processing, and tanning. It hosts two seaports and the Enrique Malek International Airport. The annual Feria Internacional de San José de David is held in March, and is dedicated to Saint Joseph.
