= Río Sereno =

- Town and corregimiento
- Location within Panama
- Coordinates: 8°49′12″N 82°51′36″W
- Country: Panama
- Province: Chiriquí
- District: Renacimiento

Area
  - Land: 83.2 km^{2} (32.1 sq mi)
- Elevation: 987 m (3,238 ft)

Population (2010)
  - Total: 5,463
  - Density: 65.7/km^{2} (170/sq mi)
- Population density calculated based on land area.
- Time zone: UTC−5 (EST)
- Website: http://www.riosereno.com

Río Sereno, also known as Sereno, is a town and corregimiento in Renacimiento District, Chiriquí Province, Panama, close to the Costa Rica border. It is the seat of Renacimiento District. It has a land area of 83.2 square kilometres (32.1 sq mi) and had a population of 5,463 as of 2010, giving it a population density of 65.7 inhabitants per square kilometre (170/sq mi). Its population as of 1990 was 2,595; its population as of 2000 was 3,289.

It is a rural dairy and agricultural region. The town is surrounded by vegetation.

Seasons:

Dry (Summer): December - April
Wet (Winter): May - November

Elevation: 1000 meters (over 3200 feet)

Average temperature: 18 °C

Climate: tropical template
