= Pedregal, Boquerón =

Pedregal
- Corregimiento
- Location within Panama
- Coordinates: 8°22′12″N 82°25′48″W
- Country: Panama
- Province: Chiriquí

Area
  - Land: 20.8 km^{2} (8.0 sq mi)

Population (2023)
  - Total: 2,627
  - Density: 126.1/km^{2} (327/sq mi)
- Population density calculated based on land area.
- Time zone: UTC−5 (EST)

Pedregal is a corregimiento in David District, Chiriquí Province, Panama. It has a land area of 20.8 square kilometres (8.0 sq mi) and had a population of 2,627 as of 2023, giving it a population density of 126.1 inhabitants per square kilometre (327/sq mi). Its population as of 2010 was 2,057; its population as of 2000 was 1,950.
