= Tinajas, Spain =

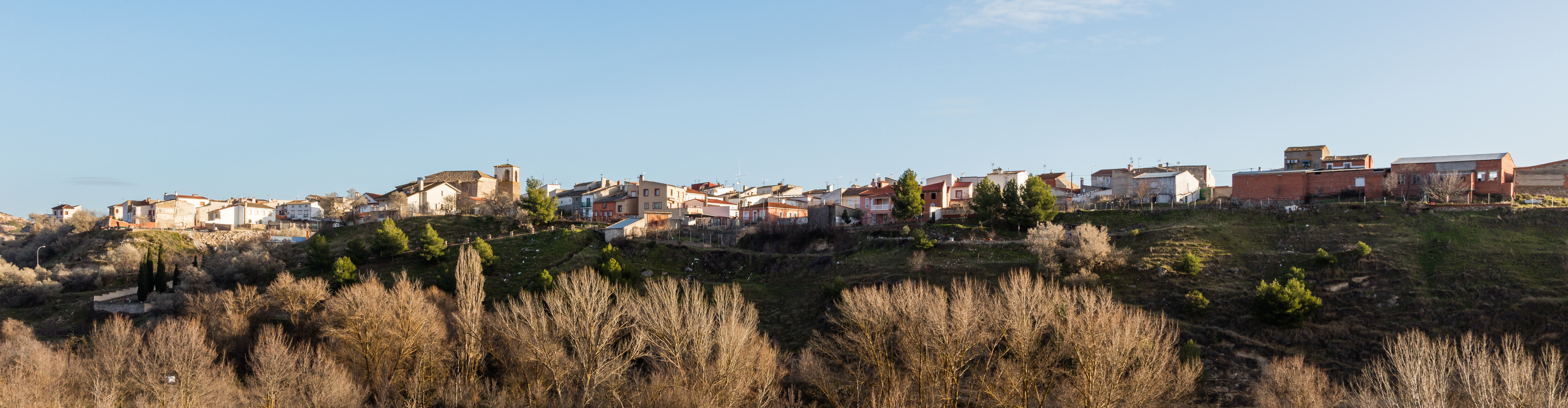
- View of Tinajas

- Flag Coat of arms

- Location within Spain Location within Castilla-La Mancha
- Coordinates: 40°20′N 2°35′W
- Country: Spain
- Autonomous community: Castile-La Mancha
- Province: Cuenca
- Municipality: Tinajas

Area
  - Total: 46 km^{2} (18 sq mi)

Population (2025-01-01)
  - Total: 184
  - Density: 4.0/km^{2} (10/sq mi)
- Time zone: UTC+1 (CET)
  - Summer (DST): UTC+2 (CEST)

Tinajas is a municipality located in the province of Cuenca, Castile-La Mancha, Spain. According to the 2004 census (INE), the municipality has a population of 370 inhabitants.
