= Tijeras, Chiriquí =

Coordinates: 8.4701°N 82.5560°W

Tijeras
- Corregimiento
- Location within Panama
- Country: Panama
- Province: Chiriquí
- District: Boquerón

Area
  - Land: 18.2 km^{2} (7.0 sq mi)

Population (2023)
  - Total: 3,466
  - Density: 190.5/km^{2} (493/sq mi)
- Population density calculated based on land area.
- Time zone: UTC−5 (EST)

Tijeras is a corregimiento in Boquerón District, Chiriquí Province, Panama. It has a land area of 18.2 square kilometres (7.0 sq mi) and had a population of 3,466 as of 2023, giving it a population density of 190.5 inhabitants per square kilometre (493/sq mi). Its population as of 2010 was 2,670; its population as of 2000 was 2,057.
