= Guacá =

Coordinates: 8.5500°N 82.5500°W

- Corregimiento
- Location within Panama
- Country: Panama
- Province: Chiriquí
- District: David

Area
  - Land: 69.2 km^{2} (26.7 sq mi)

Population (2010)
  - Total: 1,891
  - Density: 27.3/km^{2} (71/sq mi)
- Population density calculated based on land area.
- Time zone: UTC−5 (EST)

Guacá is a corregimiento in David District, Chiriquí Province, Panama. It has a land area of 69.2 square kilometres (26.7 sq mi) and had a population of 1,891 as of 2010, giving it a population density of 27.3 inhabitants per square kilometre (71/sq mi). Its population as of 1990 was 1,483; its population as of 2000 was 1,726.
