= Baco, Chiriquí =

Baco
- Corregimiento
- Interactive map of Baco
- Location within Panama
- Coordinates: 8°24′N 82°42′W
- Country: Panama
- Province: Chiriquí
- District: Barú
- Established: March 7, 1997

Area
  - Land: 75.5 km^{2} (29.2 sq mi)

Population (2023)
  - Total: 8,008
  - Density: 106.1/km^{2} (275/sq mi)
- Population density calculated based on land area.
- Time zone: UTC−5 (EST)
- Climate: Am

Baco is a corregimiento in Barú District, Chiriquí Province, Panama. It has a land area of 75.5 square kilometres (29.2 sq mi) and had a population of 8,008 as of 2023, giving it a population density of 106.1 inhabitants per square kilometre (275/sq mi). It was created by Law 10 of March 7, 1997; this measure was complemented by Law 5 of January 19, 1998 and Law 69 of October 28, 1998. Its population as of 2000 was 7,101.
