= Tinajas, Chiriquí =

Coordinates: 8.5500°N 82.4500°W

Tinajas
- Corregimiento
- Location within Panama
- Country: Panama
- Province: Chiriquí
- District: Dolega

Area
  - Land: 29.4 km^{2} (11.4 sq mi)

Population (2010)
  - Total: 1,530
  - Density: 52/km^{2} (130/sq mi)
- Population density calculated based on land area.
- Time zone: UTC−5 (EST)

Tinajas is a corregimiento in Dolega District, Chiriquí Province, Panama. It has a land area of 29.4 square kilometres (11.4 sq mi) and had a population of 1,530 as of 2010, giving it a population density of 52 inhabitants per square kilometre (130/sq mi). Its population as of 1990 was 1,084; its population as of 2000 was 1,237.
