= El Pedregal Volcano =

Volcano in Honduras

Coordinates: 14°06′14″N 87°16′25″W

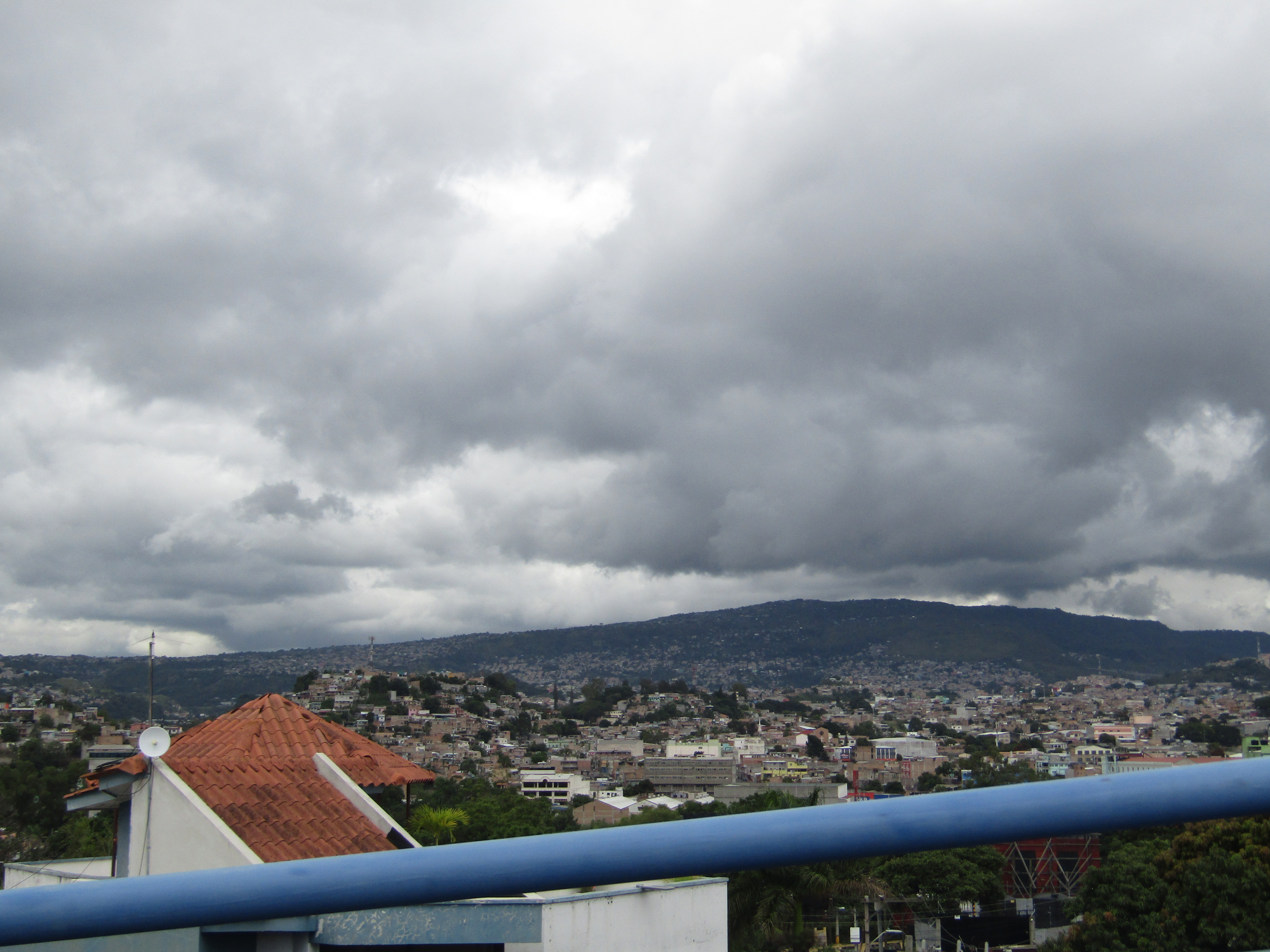
El Pedregal is one of the largest volcanoes of central america.

The Pedregal Volcano is a large shield volcano in Honduras located near the city of Comayagüela west of Tegucigalpa M.D.C.

== Characteristics ==
El Pedregal originated during the Quaternary period through basaltic eruptions and is one of the most prominent volcanoes in the highlands of central Honduras. It is characterized by being of low angle although it has a huge diameter that has meant that over the centuries there have been human settlements in it. At the top is a huge 300 square meter pond known as "Laguna el pedregal", which was formed from the crater, which after centuries of rain filled with water and formed the pond. Isolated remains of flows of the El Pedregal lava flows and separate vents are found in broad areas mainly to the west near Tegucigalpa.

However, despite its large diameter of the volcano, no activity of its kind has been recorded during the last millennia, possibly because it is extinct since the last eruption in the vicinity of what is today Tegucigalpa happened in the Pleistocene, meaning little risk for the areas surrounding it.

== See also ==
- Geography of Honduras
