= Pedregal (Costa Rica) =

The Pedregal rock art site is located in the most northwest corner of Costa Rica and lies only 20 km away from the Nicaraguan border. Its outstanding ground monuments belong to the Cordillera de Guanacaste mountain range, situated in the correspondent province of Guanacaste. The whole Pedregal archaeological zone forms part of the Guanacaste Conservation Area (GCA) and has been declared an UNESCO World Natural Heritage Site in 1999. The first scientific report on its rock art monuments dates from 1989 and is listed in the archaeological database of the Costa Rican National Museum under the sites key G-540-Pd.

== Ground monuments and their surroundings ==
At the El Pedregal site there are at least 465 rocks and boulders decorated with petroglyphs (Künne and Strecker 2008: 17). They are scattered to several high savannahs, which can be found on the Pacific slope of the Orosí volcano. The main savannah (fig. 1) lies between 400m and 800m above sea level and is probably the result of extensive deforestation during late 19th century. Actually it extends around 93 ha and is overgrown by dispersed bushes and trees. The entire grass land forms a peculiar contrast to the nearby tropical forests (Nuhn 1978: 31) covering the remaining volcanic slopes. They consist of pre-montane dry forests as well as montane wet and rain forests, depending on their altitude.

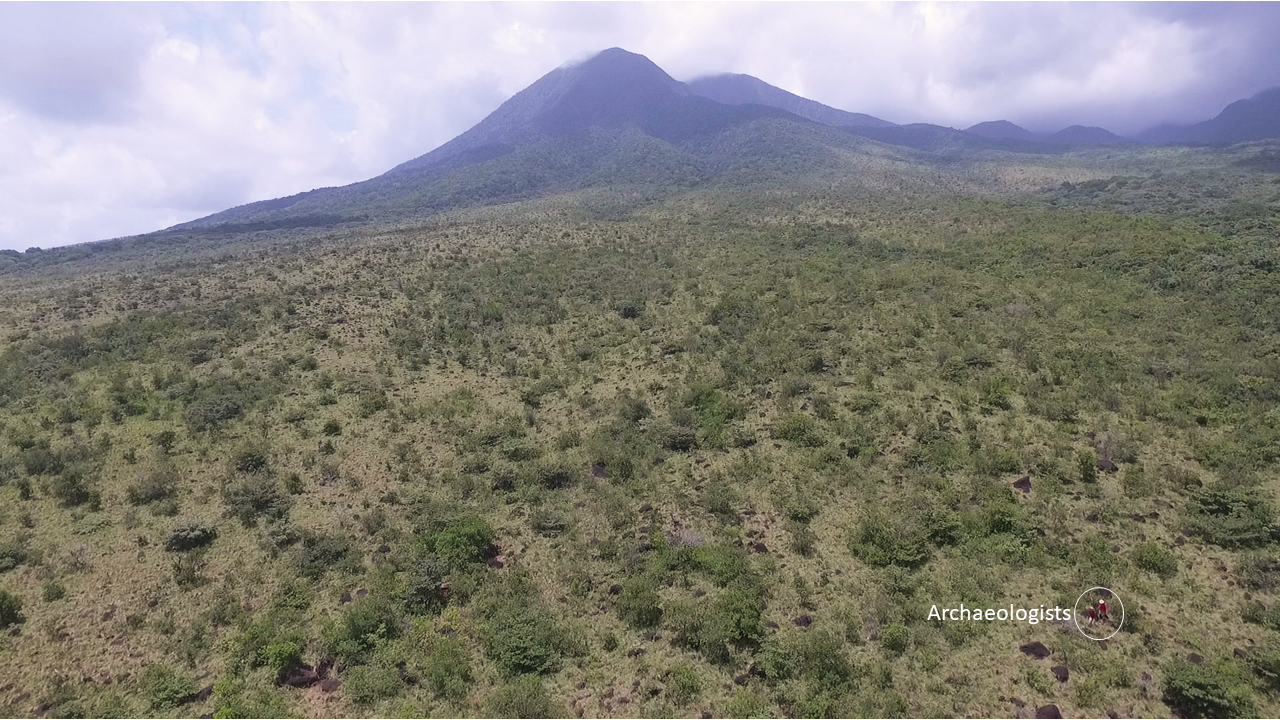
Fig. 1: Aerial photography of the Pedregal site on the slopes of the Orosí volcano

All decorated stones occur in open terrain and vary in size. While the largest boulders can be up to 5.20m long, up to 4.30m wide and up to 2.10m high (fig. 2), their majority does not measure more than 2.00 m × 1.00 m × 1.00 m (length × width × height). All worked boulders consist of volcanic rocks. Considering its disperse location they seem to form a chaotic ensemble at the first impression. Due to the large size, the high number and the iconographic complexity of decorated stones, the Pedregal site is one of the most impressive archaeological monuments of Costa Rica and one of the most important rock art sites in Central America.

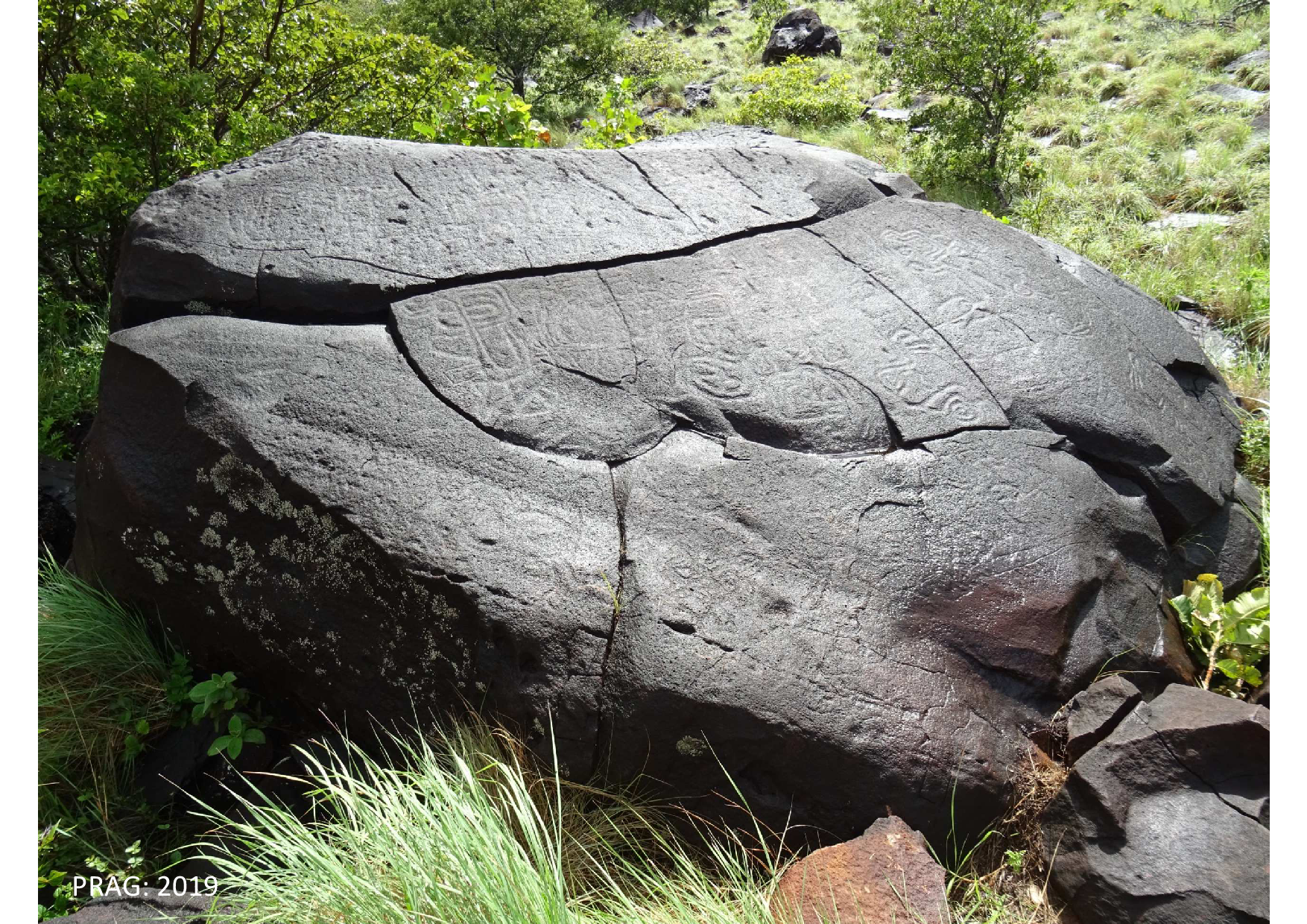
Fig. 2: Engraved rock art boulder at the Pedregal site

== Boulders' iconographies ==
The most frequent decorations of the Pedregal site show geometric petroglyphs (spirals, concentric circles and crosses, squares, meanders, etc.) and/or curvilinear iconographies. While the latter ones can form complex compositions, the sites figurative representations are less numerous. They depict bimorph faces and heads as well as anthropomorphic figures. Some of these motifs show specific clothing and jewelry attributes. Although some anthropomorphic images take on dynamic poses, they rarely interact with other decorations. Besides, the sites figurative inventory also includes zoomorphic representations. They can embody snake- (fig. 3), lizard-, bird- or tapir-like creatures. In contrast, phytomorphic motifs doesn't appear clearly.

The iconographic inventory of the volcano Orosí seems to originate from a local convention of stone processing which is embedded into the traditions of the Greater Nicoya region. Additionally, the iconography of the Pedregal site also imitates Mesoamerican and South American patterns. They witness a broad variety of transcultural interrelationships maintained by the indigenous societies of Costa Rica before the arrival of European conquerors.

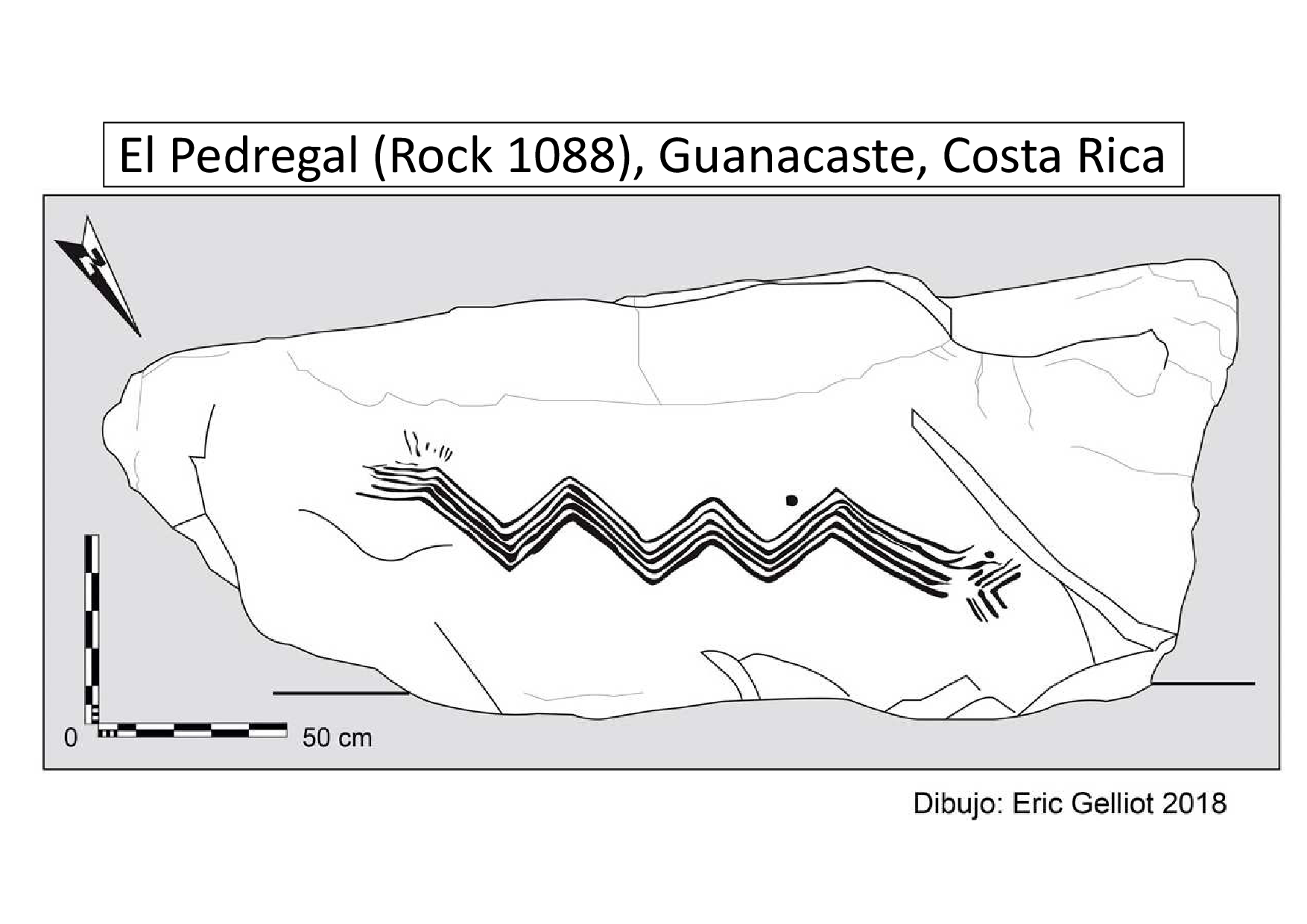
Fig. 3: Zoomorph representation (serpent) at the Pedregal site

A large number of the site's petroglyphs can also be recognized on the pre-Columbian ceramics originating from northwest Costa Rica. Their classification indicates a considerable number of motifs dating back to the early Tempisque-Bagaces period (500 BCE – 800 AD) whereas a minor iconographical corpus may be associated to the later Sapoá-Ometepe (800–1530 AD) era.

== Study and research projects ==
In 1993 the North American archaeologist Ellen Hardy initiated a first systematic research project dealing with the Pedregal petroglyphs under the name "Proyecto Arqueológico Volcán Orosí (PAVO)" (Hardy and Vázquez 1993). Cooperating with the University of California Los Angeles (UCLA) and the Museo Nacional de Costa Rica (MNCR) the long-term study documented a total of 324 decorated boulders until 2008. Although the recorded data were incorporated into a first geographical information system during the following years. The first research results of the PAVO was exposed in the 59th Annual Meeting for the Society for American Archaeology (SAA) in april 1994.

Since 2018 the investigation of the Pedregal rock art has been continued by the "Proyecto Arqueológico Guanacaste (PRAG)". Resulting from the cooperation of scientific institutions located in France, Germany and Costa Rica the particular focus of the recently initiated project is on the sites position within the transcultural networks of the Greater Nicoya region (Costa et al. 2019). The creation of a modern geographical information system permits the inclusion of the formerly required data of Hardy and Vázquez. By using a drone, more than 2000 distortion-free and georeferenced orthographies were recorded from the site's main savannah. In addition, the project developed three-dimensional models of more than 30 decorated boulders. They are based on photogrammetric images and can be animated. A series of virtual tours is in progress.

The PRAG is supported by the Institut Francais d'Amérique Centrale (IFAC), the Laboratoire d'Archéologie des Amériques (ArchAm, UMR 8096), the Museos del Banco Central de Costa Rica (MBCCR), the Área de Conservación Guanacaste (ACG), the Rheinische Friedrich-Wilhelms-Universität Bonn (Department of Ancient American Studies) and the Deutsche Altamerika Stiftung (DAS). Further project partners are the Museo Nacional de Costa Rica, the Centro de Estudios Mexicanos y Centroamericanos (CEMCA) and the Institut National de Recherches Archéologiques Préventives (INRAP).

The whole project has a duration of 5 years (2018–2022) and includes further prospections, the application of new recording technologies, archaeological test excavations and archaeometric investigations. The projects implementation lies in the hands of Philippe Costa, Priscilla Molina Muñoz, Martin Künne and Eric Gelliot. All research results will be presented both to the scientific community and to the general public.

== Bibliography ==
- Bergoeing, J. P. (1998), Geomorfólogia de Costa Rica. (E. Bedoya Benítez, Ed.). San José, Costa Rica: Instituto Geográfico Nacional.
- Chavez Jiménez, A. (1989), Visita a la estación Maritza, faldas de volcán Orosí, Guanacaste. San José, Costa Rica.
- Costa P., Molina Muñoz P., Künne M., Gelliot E. (2019), Informe final de la fase preliminar del proyecto arqueológico Guanacaste 2018, rapport présenté à la Commission Archéologique Nationale du Costa Rica, San José, Costa Rica.
- Hardy, E. T., & Vásquez, R. L. (1993), Proyecto Arqueológico Volcán Orosi. Results of preliminary investigation of sitio Pedregal. San José, Costa Rica.
- Hardy, Ellen (1994), "Petroglyphs of Orosí Volcano: Graphic Representations of Prehispanic Social Organization, ideology and religious beliefs". In: 59th Annual Meeting for the Society for American Archaeology (SAA), April 1994.
- Künne M., Baker S. (2016), "Recent rock art studies in the Maya Region and the Intermediate Area, 2010-14". In: Bahn, Paul; Natalie Franklin and Matthias Strecker (eds.): Rock Art Studies: News of the World, 5: 267–84. Oxford, UK: Archaeopress Publishing.
- Künne, M., & Strecker, M. (2008), Arte rupestre de Mexico y America Central (2ème). Berlín, Alemania: Institut Ibéro Américain, Fundacion Patromonio Cultural Prusiano y el Gebr. Mann Verlag.
- Stone A., Künne M. (2003), "Rock Art of Central America and Maya Mexico". In: Bahn, Paul y Angelo Fossati (eds.): Rock Art Studies: News of the World II: 196–213. Oxford, UK: Oxbow Books.
