= Bágala =

- Corregimiento
- Interactive map of Bágala
- Location within Panama
- Coordinates: 8°28′N 82°32′W
- Country: Panama
- Province: Chiriquí
- District: Boquerón

Area
  - Land: 43.3 km^{2} (16.7 sq mi)

Population (2023)
  - Total: 5,113
  - Density: 118/km^{2} (310/sq mi)
- Population density calculated based on land area.
- Time zone: UTC−5 (EST)
- Climate: Am

Bágala is a corregimiento in Boquerón District, Chiriquí Province, Panama. It has a land area of 43.3 square kilometres (16.7 sq mi), and had a population of 5,113 as of 2010, giving it a population density of 118.0 inhabitants per square kilometre (306/sq mi). Its population as of 1990 was 1,653; its population as of 2000 was 2,038.
