= Gualaca =

- Corregimiento
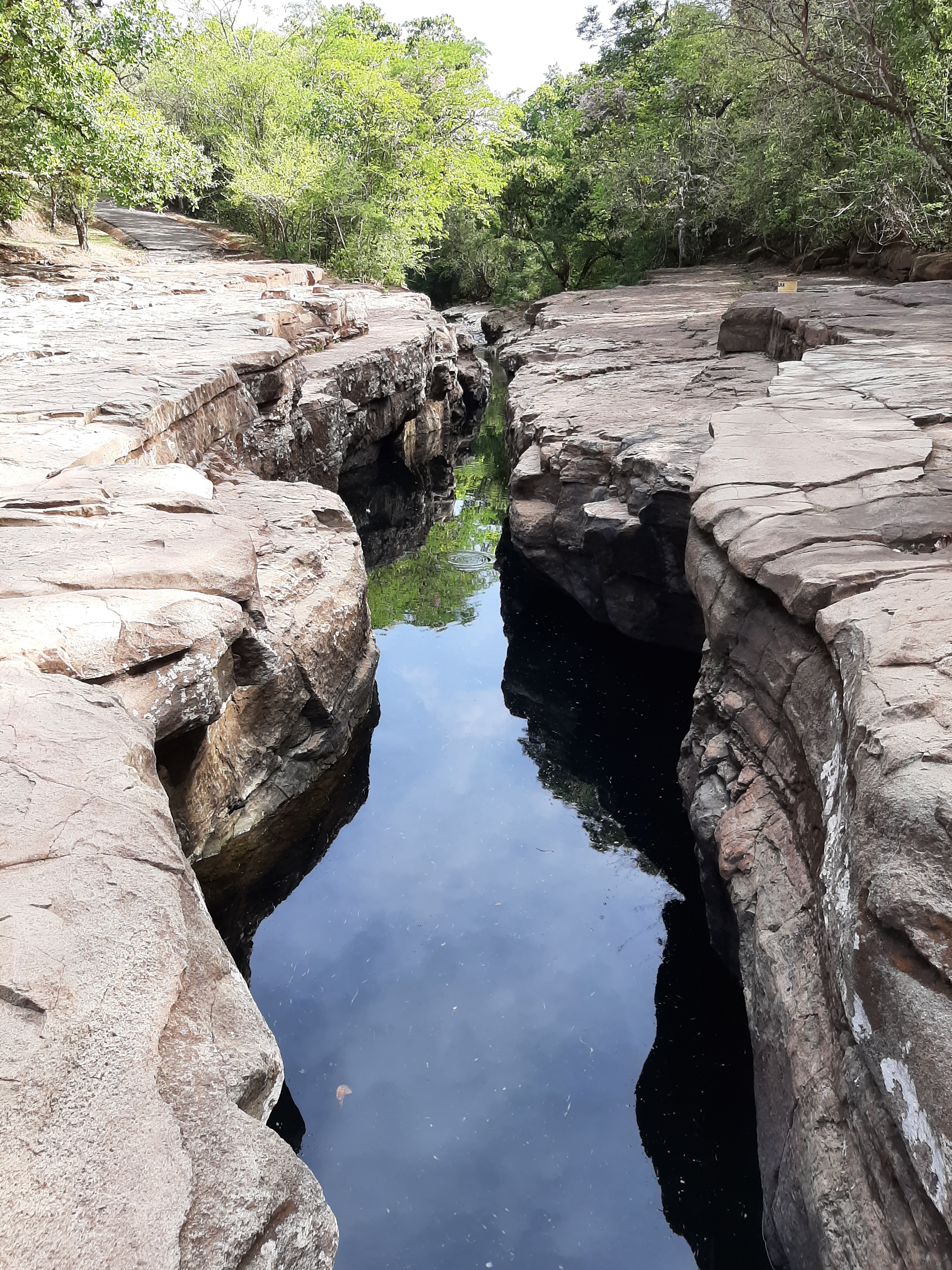
- The Cangilones of Gualaca, Chiriqui Province, Panama
- Interactive map of Gualaca
- Location within Panama
- Coordinates: 8°31′48″N 82°17′24″W
- Country: Panama
- Province: Chiriquí
- District: Gualaca

Area
  - Land: 237.3 km^{2} (91.6 sq mi)

Population (2010)
  - Total: 5,605
  - Density: 23.6/km^{2} (61/sq mi)
- Population density calculated based on land area.
- Time zone: UTC−5 (EST)

Gualaca is a corregimiento in Gualaca District, Chiriquí Province, Panama. It is the seat of Gualaca District. It has a land area of 237.3 square kilometres (91.6 sq mi) and had a population of 5,605 as of 2010, giving it a population density of 23.6 inhabitants per square kilometre (61/sq mi). Its population as of 1990 was 4,099; its population as of 2000 was 4,430.
