= Remedios District =

- District

- Location of the district capital in Panama
- Coordinates: 8°14′N 82°51′W
- Country: Panama
- Province: Chiriquí Province
- Capital: Remedios

Area
  - Total: 66.5 sq mi (172.2 km^{2})

Population (2000)
  - Total: 4,388
- Time zone: UTC-5 (ETZ)

Remedios District (Spanish pronunciation: [reˈmeðjos]) is a district in the Chiriquí Province of Panama. It covers an area of 172.2 km^{2} (66.5 sq mi) and has a population of 4,388 inhabitants as per the 2023 census. It was established in 1589, and is the smallest district by area and population in the province. The city of Remedios serves as the capital.

== History ==
The Chiriquí region was first explored by Spanish sailor Gaspar de Espinosa in 1519. Remedios was established in 1589 by Martín Gutierrez, and is the oldest district in the Chiriquí Province. The settlement was established over the territory, which was known as La Garita. In 1620, a fire destroyed the initial settlement, and the new settlement came up along the banks of the San Félix River. Records indicate that Lorenzo del Salto, the Royal Governor of Panama, ordered the movement of "Los Remedios". The name comes from the Marian devotional roots, and the existence of a golden image of Mary, hidden in a well in the region.

As per oral traditions of the Ngäbe people, the history of Remedios is linked to Rogara Meto (also known as Gö Caballero), who set fire to the city of Remedios to protest the Spanish colonial occupation. He later jumped into the sea from the top of Cerro Rogatu (Sugarloaf mountain), and later became a giant fish that swallowed the Spanish boats.

In the 17th century, Remedios became a trading and ship building center. In May 1680, Richard Sawkins led a group of pirates and attacked Remedios, which resulted in a confrontation with the locals and the death of Sawkins. However, it was further attacked by pirates in 1685. In the 19th century, Remedios experienced an economic upturn due to gold mining, and was the capital of the Guaymi canton of Guaymí in the Veraguas province, and composed of five of the current districts including the present-day Remedios.

== Geography ==
Remedios District is one of the 82 districts of Panama. It is the smallest district by area and population in the Chiriquí province. It is spread over an area of 172.2 km^{2} (66.5 sq mi).

== Administration and politics ==
Remedios District has its capital at the city of Remedios. The district is divided administratively into the following corregimientos–Remedios, El Nancito, El Porvenir, El Puerto, and Santa Lucía.

The National Assembly of Panama has 71 members, who are elected directly from single and multi-member constituencies. The district forms part of the Chiriquí Province, which elects three members to the National Assembly. The district forms part of the Chiriquí Province, which has seven electoral circuits, and elects 11 members to the National Assembly.

== Demographics ==
As per the 2023 census, Remedios District had a population of 4,388 inhabitants. The population increased from 4,052 in the 2010 census. The population consisted of 2,267 males and 2,121 females. About 1,147 (26.1%) of the inhabitants were below the age of 14 years and 474 inhabitants (10.4%) were above the age of 65 years. The entire population was classified as rural. Non-indigenous, non-Afro-descendant people (46.9%) formed the largest ethnic group in the district, followed by Afro-descendant people (33.5%) and Ngäbe people (18.6%).
