= Gualaca District =

- District
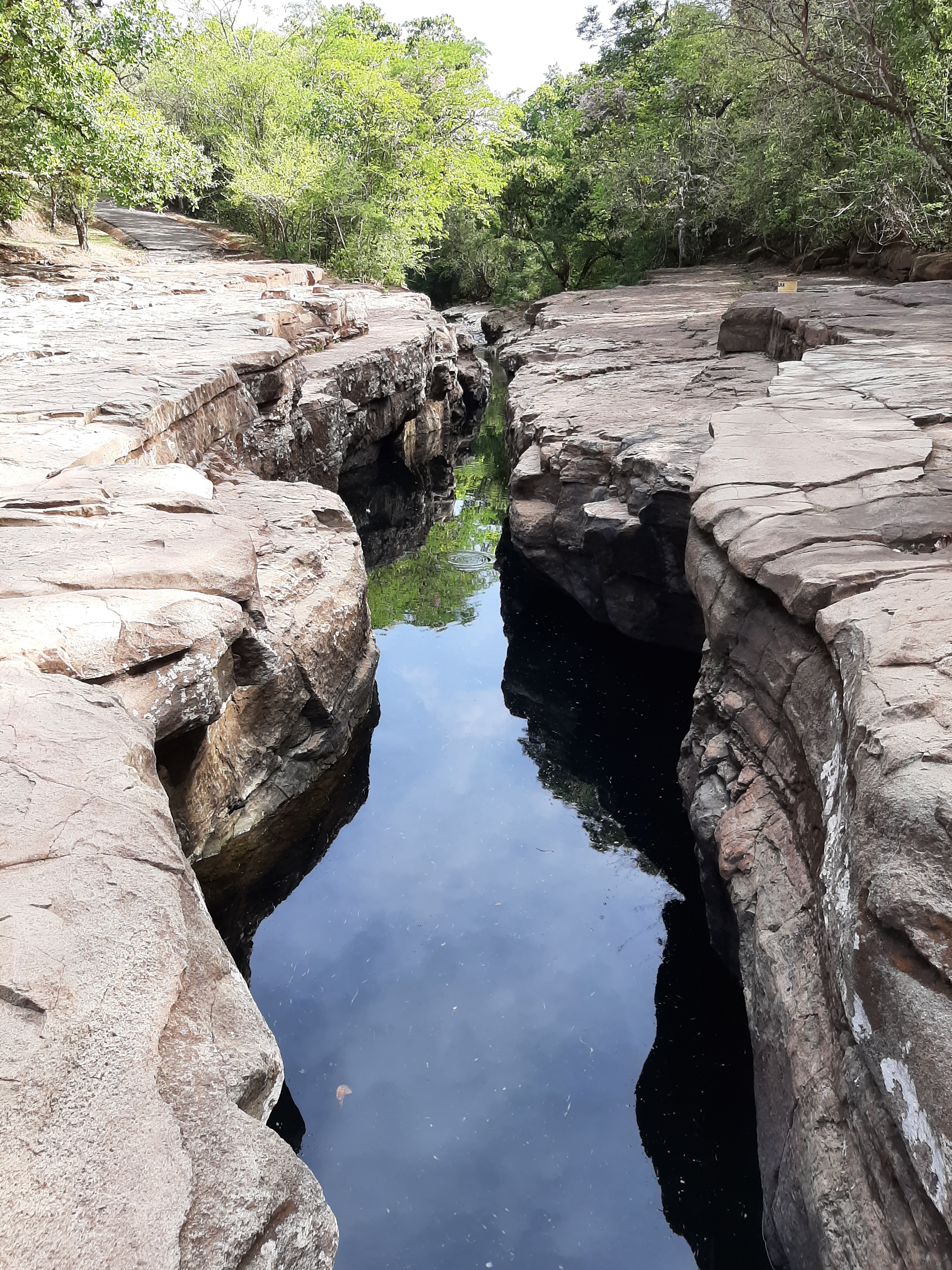

- Location of the district capital in Panama
- Coordinates: 8°31′48″N 82°17′24″W
- Country: Panama
- Province: Chiriquí Province
- Capital: Gualaca

Area
  - Total: 239 sq mi (619 km^{2})

Population (2023)
  - Total: 9,831
- Time zone: UTC-5 (ETZ)

Gualaca District is a district in the Chiriquí Province of Panama. It covers an area of 619 km^{2} (239 sq mi) and has a population of 9,831 inhabitants as per the 2023 census. The Fortuna Dam, located in the corregimiento of Hornito, hosts the country's largest hydroelectric power station.

== Geography ==
Gualaca District is one of the 82 districts of Panama. It is part of the Chiriquí Province. It is spread over an area of 619 km^{2} (239 sq mi). The district contains several waterfalls and is known as the land of waterfalls. It generates the most hydroelectricity of all the districts in Panama. The Fortuna Dam, located in the corregimiento of Hornito, hosts the country's largest hydroelectric power station, with an installed capacity of 300 mega watt. It was completed in 1984 and its height was further raised in 1994.

== Administration and politics ==
Gualaca District was created by law on 29 December 1862, enacted by the Constituent Assembly of the Federal State of Panama with its capital at the city of Gualaca. The town of Gualaca itself was established in 1766 by Franciscan missionaries. The district is divided administratively into the following corregimientos–Gualaca, Hornito, Los Ángeles, Paja de Sombrero, and Rincón.

The National Assembly of Panama has 71 members, who are elected directly from single and multi-member constituencies. The district forms part of the Chiriquí Province, which elects three members to the National Assembly. The district forms part of the Chiriquí Province, which has seven electoral circuits, and elects 11 members to the National Assembly.

== Demographics ==
As per the 2023 census, Gualaca District had a population of 9,831 inhabitants. The population increased from 9,750 in the 2010 census. The population consisted of 5,097 males and 4,734 females. About 2,160 (22.0%) of the inhabitants were below the age of 14 years and 1,221 inhabitants (12.4%) were above the age of 65 years. The majority (64.1%) of the population was classified as rural while the remaining 35.9% was classified as urban. Non-indigenous, non-Afro-descendant people (85.3%) formed the largest ethnic group in the district, followed by Afro-descendant people (8.8%) and Ngäbe people (5.5%).
