= Barú District, Chiriquí =

Barú District
- District
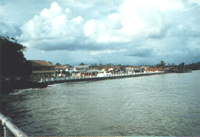

- Location of the district capital in Panama
- Coordinates: 8°17′N 82°52′W
- Country: Panama
- Province: Chiriquí Province
- Capital: Puerto Armuelles

Area
  - Total: 231.7 sq mi (600.2 km^{2})

Population (2023)
  - Total: 56,307
  - Density: 243/sq mi (93.8/km^{2})
- Time zone: UTC-5 (ETZ)

Barú District is a district in the Chiriquí Province of Panama. It covers an area of 600.2 km^{2} (231.7 sq mi) and has a population of 56,307 inhabitants as per the 2023 census. The Zona Franca de Barú (Baru Free Zone) was established in 2001 for promoting investment and regional commerce, due to its location on the border with Costa Rica. The Trans-Panama pipeline has one of its terminals at Charco Azul in the district.

== Geography ==
Barú District is one of the 82 districts of Panama. It is part of the Chiriquí Province. It is spread over an area of 595.0 km^{2} (229.7 sq mi). The district is located at the western extreme of Chiriquí Province, along the Pacific Ocean coast, and borders Costa Rica.

The district consists of a mix of mountainous and flat coastal terrain. There are a few beaches along the coast including the Punta Burica. The Chiriquí Viejo River originates at the Cerro Respingo in the Volcán Barú National Park in the district. The national park covers the area around Volcán Barú, an active volcano, and the tallest mountain in Panama, at 3,475 m (11,401 ft).

== Administration and politics ==
The district formed part of the Alanje District previously, and was created on 12 July 1941 with its capital at the city of Puerto Armuelles. It is divided administratively into seven corregimientos–Puerto Armuelles, Limones, Progreso, Baco, Rodolfo Aguilar Delgado, El Palmar, and Manaca.

The National Assembly of Panama has 71 members, who are elected directly from single and multi-member constituencies. The district forms part of the Chiriquí Province, which elects three members to the National Assembly. The district forms part of the Chiriquí Province, which has seven electoral circuits, and elects 11 members to the National Assembly.

== Demographics ==
As per the 2023 census, Barú District had a population of 56,307 inhabitants. The population decreased from 60,551 in the 2010 census. The population consisted of 28,414 males and 27,893 females. About 14,688 (26.1%) of the inhabitants were below the age of 14 years and 6,452 inhabitants (11.5%) were above the age of 65 years. The majority (68.1%) of the population was classified as urban while the remaining 31.9% was classified as rural. Non-indigenous, non-Afro-descendant people (57.8%) formed the largest ethnic group in the district, followed by Afro-descendant people (23.7%) and Ngäbe people (17.9%).

== Economy ==
The economy of the district is dependent on agriculture which includes the cultivation of rice, sorghum, oil palm, banana, and maize, and livestock rearing. The Trans-Panama pipeline has one of its terminals at Charco Azul, located in the district. The Zona Franca de Barú (Baru Free Zone) was established in 2001 for promoting investment and regional commerce, due to its location on the border with Costa Rica.
