= Remedios, Chiriquí =

Coordinates: 8.2263°N 81.8304°W

Remedios
- Corregimiento
- Location within Panama
- Country: Panama
- Province: Chiriquí
- District: Remedios

Area
  - Land: 43.5 km^{2} (16.8 sq mi)

Population (2010)
  - Total: 908
  - Density: 20.9/km^{2} (54/sq mi)
- Population density calculated based on land area.
- Time zone: UTC−5 (EST)

Remedios is a corregimiento in Remedios District, Chiriquí Province, Panama. It is the seat of Remedios District. It has a land area of 43.5 square kilometres (16.8 sq mi) and had a population of 908 as of 2010, giving it a population density of 20.9 inhabitants per square kilometre (54/sq mi). Its population as of 1990 was 2,650; its population as of 2000 was 962.
