= Chiriquí Province =

Province of Panama

Chiriquí Province Provincia de Chiriquí
- Province
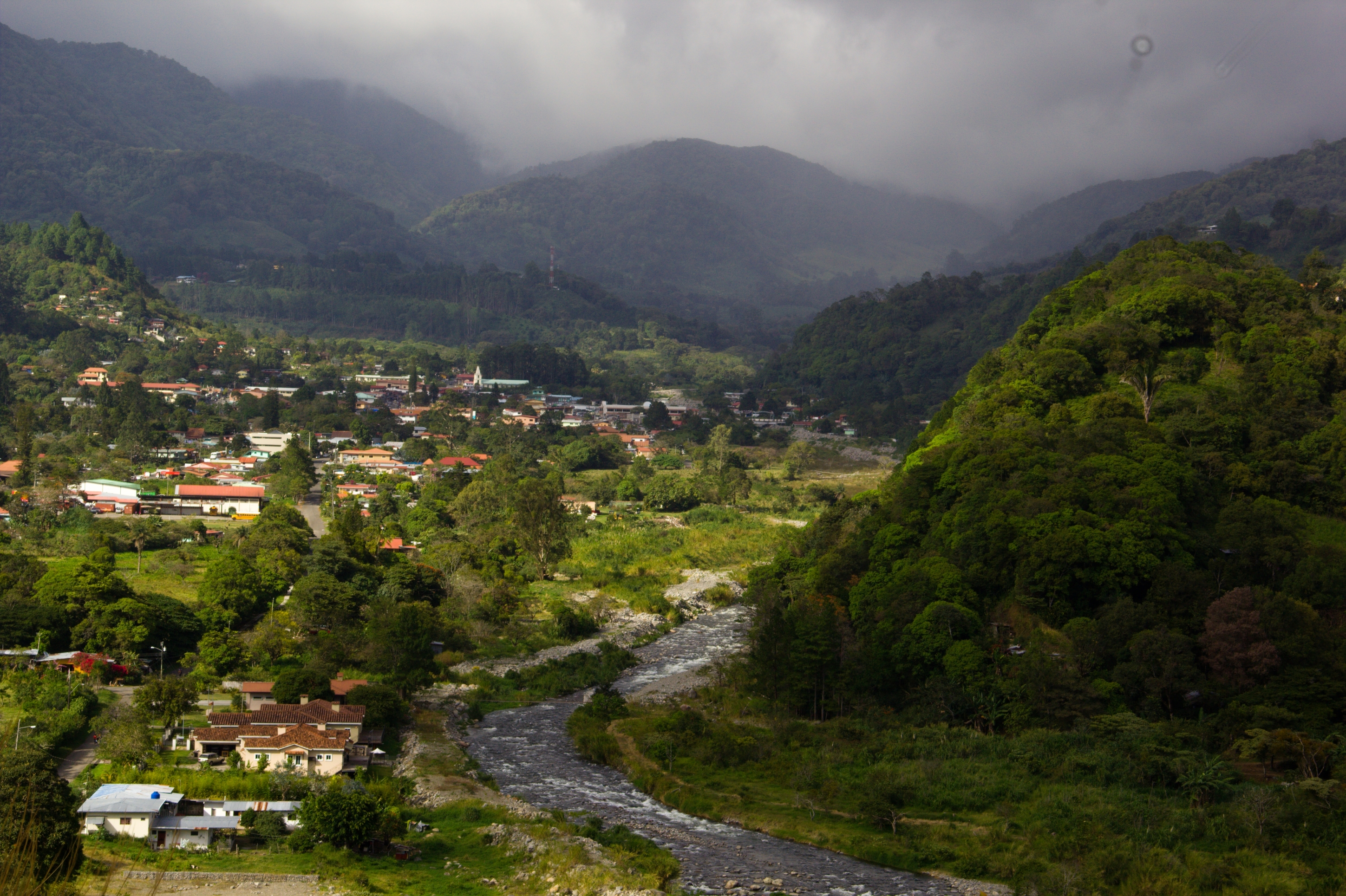
- Boquete

- Flag

- Coordinates (Seat of government): 8°25′47″N 82°25′48″W
- Country: Panama
- Founded: 26 May 1849
- Capital: David

Area
  - Total: 6,490.9 km^{2} (2,506.2 sq mi)
- Highest elevation: 3,477 m (11,407 ft)
- Lowest elevation: 0 m (0 ft)

Population (2023 census)
  - Total: 471,071
  - Rank: 3rd
  - Density: 72.574/km^{2} (187.97/sq mi)

GDP (PPP, constant 2015 values)
  - Year: 2023
  - Total: $11.9 billion
  - Per capita: $26,800
- Time zone: UTC-5 (EDT)
- ISO 3166 code: PA-4
- Gini (2007): 32.9 (low)
- HDI (2021): 0.805 very high

Chiriquí, officially the Chiriquí Province (Spanish: Provincia de Chiriquí, pronounced [tʃiɾiˈki]), is a province of Panama located on the western coast; it is the second most developed province in the country, after Panamá Province. Its capital is the city of David. It has a total area of 6,490.9 km^{2} and a population of 471,071 as of the year 2023. The province of Chiriquí is bordered to the north by the province of Bocas del Toro, to the west by Costa Rica, to the east by the province of Veraguas, and to the south by the Pacific Ocean, specifically the Gulf of Chiriquí.

== History ==
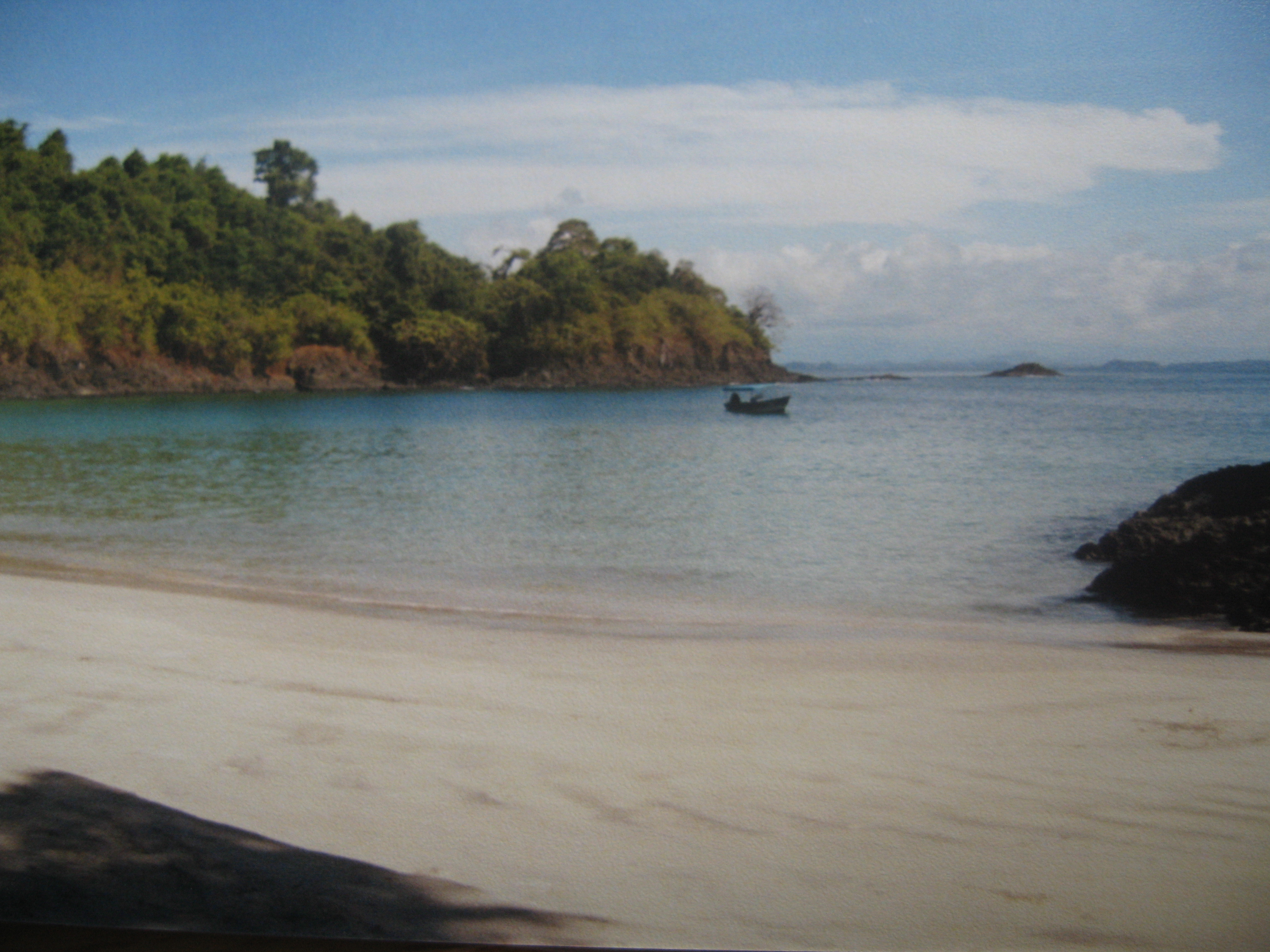
Beach in Chiriquí National Park

Until the arrival of the Spanish conquistadores, Chiriquí was populated by a number of indigenous tribes, known collectively as the Guaymí people.

The first European to visit and describe Chiriquí was Gaspar de Espinosa, in 1519. The province was officially established on 26 May 1849, when Panama was still part of Colombia. Several years later, President Abraham Lincoln of the United States proposed Chiriquí as a favored location for Linconia, a colony for free blacks from the United States. Only 349 accepted the offer. Most blacks were not interested.

Chiriquí was the province in which Manuel Noriega rose in the military ranks in the late 20th century; he helped bring Omar Torrijos back into the country after a coup d'état. Noriega had jeeps lined up with their lights on the runway in David to allow Torrijos's aircraft to land. Chiriqui was at the heart of a short-lived pro-democracy guerrilla movement in the late 1960s and early 1970s. After the dictatorship by Manuel Noriega from 1983 to 1989, Guillermo Endara became president of Panama; he appointed Edgar De Puy as governor of Chiriquí.

== Administrative divisions ==
As of the 2023 Census, Chiriquí Province is divided into 14 distritos (districts) and sub-divided into 105 corregimientos.

Distrito	Area (km^{2})	Population 2000	Population 2010	Population 2023
Alanje	455	15,497	16,508	18,877
Barú	600	60,551	55,775	56,307
Boquerón	298	12,275	15,029	21,001
Boquete	490	16,943	21,370	23,562
Bugaba	517	51,522	78,209	68,870
David	892	124,280	144,858	156,498
Dolega	251	17,243	25,102	37,678
Gualaca	619	8,348	9,750	9,831
Remedios	172	3,489	4,052	4,388
Renacimiento	527	18,257	20,524	22,429
San Félix	226	5,276	6,304	6,881
San Lorenzo	689	6,498	7,507	8,031
Tierras Altas	360	17,048	20,471	23,525
Tolé	485	11,563	11,885	13,193

District	Corregimientos (Subdivisions)	Cabecera (Seat)
Alanje District	Santiago de Alanje, Canta Gallo, Divalá, El Tejar, Guarumal, Nuevo México, Palo Grande, Querévalo, Santo Tomás	Santiago de Alanje
Barú District	Puerto Tomás Armuelles, Baco, Limones, Progreso, Rodolfo Aguilar Delgado, El Palmar, Manaca	Puerto Tomás Armuelles
Boquerón District	Boquerón, Bágala, Cordillera, Guabal, Guayabal, Paraíso, Pedregal, Tijeras	Boquerón
Boquete District	Bajo Boquete, Alto Boquete, Caldera, Jaramillo, Los Naranjos, Palmira	Bajo Boquete
Bugaba District	La Concepción, Aserrío de Gariché, Bugaba, El Bongo, Gómez, La Estrella, San Andrés, Santa Marta, Santa Rosa, Santo Domingo, Solano, Sortová, San Isidro	La Concepción
David District	San José de David, Bijagual, Cochea, Chiriquí, Guacá, Las Lomas, Pedregal, San Carlos, San Pablo Nuevo, San Pablo Viejo, David Este, David Sur	San José de David
Dolega District	San Francisco de Dolega, Dos Ríos, Los Algarrobos, Los Anastacios, Potrerillos, Potrerillos Abajo, Rovira, Tinajas	San Francisco de Dolega
Gualaca District	Gualaca, Hornito, Los Angeles, Paja de Sombrero, Rincón	Gualaca
Remedios District	Nuestra Señora de los Remedios, El Nancito, El Porvenir, El Puerto, Santa Lucía	Nuestra Señora de los Remedios
Renacimiento District	Río Sereno, Breñón, Cañas Gordas, Dominical, Monte Lirio, Plaza de Caisán, Santa Clara, Santa Cruz	Río Sereno
San Félix District	Las Lajas, Juay, Lajas Adentro, San Félix, Santa Cruz	Las Lajas
San Lorenzo District	Horconcitos, Boca Chica, Boca del Monte, San Juan, San Lorenzo	Horconcitos
Tierras Altas District	Volcán, Cerro Punta, Cuesta de Piedra, Nueva California, Paso Ancho	Volcán
Tolé District	Tolé, Bella Vista, Cerro Viejo, El Cristo, Justo Fidel Palacios, Lajas de Tolé, Potrero de Caña, Quebrada de Piedra, Veladero	Tolé

Note: Through Law 55 of 13 September 2013, the creation of Tierras Altas District had been approved, consisting of the corregimientos of Cerro Punta, Cuesta de Piedra, Nueva California, Paso Ancho and Volcán, which were split off from Bugaba District. The new district was to have Volcán as its main centre. Also through that same law, the corregimiento of Solano was created, after splitting off from the corregimiento of La Concepción, Bugaba. That new administrative division within Chiriquí Province was to come into effect by 2 May 2019.

== Climate ==
The province features a variety of climates, from hot and humid lowlands to the cool and moist highlands. The district is home to Fortuna Forest Reserve.
