= El Espinal =

El Espinal may refer to:

- El Espinal, Tolima, Colombia
- El Espinal, Oaxaca, Mexico
- El Espinal, Los Santos, Panama
