= Herasto Reyes =

Herasto Marcial Reyes Barahona
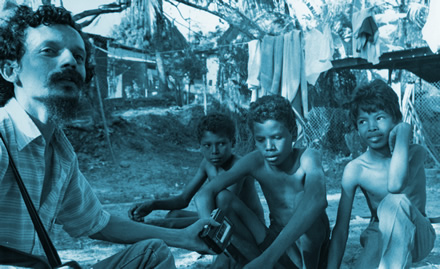
- Born: October 10, 1952; Vallerriquito, Las Tablas, Los Santos Province, Panama
- Died: October 27, 2005 (aged 53)
- Education: University of Panama (Journalism)
- Occupations: Journalist, writer, political activist
- Notable work: Revolución Socialista, La Verdad Socialista, Voz Independiente
- Awards: UNICEF Press Award (1992)

Herasto Marcial Reyes Barahona (10 October 1952 – 27 October 2005) was a Panamanian journalist, writer and political activist. Reyes was born in Vallerriquito, Las Tablas, Los Santos on October 10, 1952.

== Biography ==
He studied journalism at the University of Panama. In 1975 he took part in founding the Trotskyist Revolutionary Socialist League (LSR), which later became the Socialist Workers Party (PST). He contributed extensively to, and often edited, party organs like Revolución Socialista, La Verdad Socialista and Voz Independiente.

From 1980 to 1987 he was the director of the Centro de Comunicación Popular.

In 1987 he began working at La Prensa, where he would become Investigative Editor.

In 1992 he was awarded the UNICEF Press Award for his work for child rights.

The president of Panama, Ernesto Pérez Balladares, filed a libel suit against Reyes in August 1998, after Reyes had accused the administration of covering up a government embezzlement scandal. What followed was a lengthy legal process, which was highlighted by international human rights organizations.

== Works ==
Works written by Reyes include:

- Los medios de comunicación masiva en Panamá (1973),
- Historia de San Miguelito (1981)
- Cuentos de la vida (INAC, Panamá, 1984)
- Apuntes panameños de municipalidad (1986)
- Cuentos en la noche del mar (1988).
- Monólogo de la muerte (play)
