= Tonosí District =

- District
- Seal

- Location of the district capital in Panama
- Coordinates: 7°24′0″N 80°26′24″W
- Country: Panama
- Province: Los Santos Province
- Capital: Tonosí

Area
  - Total: 500 sq mi (1,294 km^{2})

Population (2020)
  - Total: 10,094
  - Density: 20.3/sq mi (7.84/km^{2})
- Time zone: UTC-5 (ETZ)

Tonosí District is a district (distrito) of Los Santos Province in Panama. The population according to the 2000 census was 9,736. The district covers a total area of 1,294 km^{2} (500 sq mi). The capital lies at the city of Tonosí.

== Administrative divisions ==
Tonosí District is divided administratively into the following corregimientos:

- Tonosí (capital)
- Altos de Guera
- Cañas
- El Bebedero
- El Cacao
- El Cortezo
- Flores
- Guánico
- La Tronosa
- Cambutal
- Isla de Cañas
