= Las Tablas District =

- District
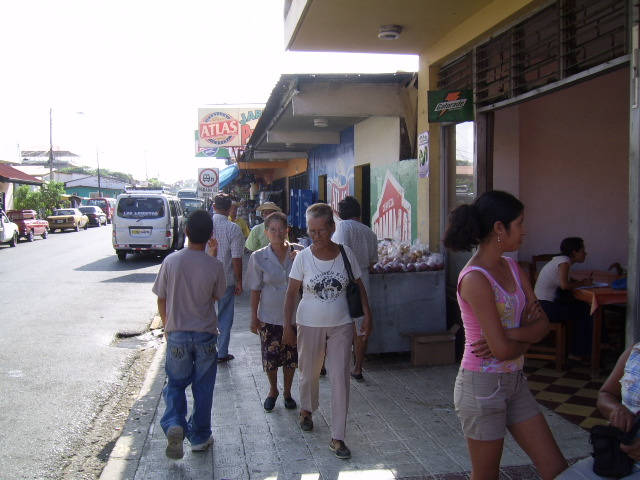

- Coat of arms

- Location of the district capital in Panama
- Coordinates: 7°46′N 80°17′W
- Country: Panama
- Province: Los Santos Province
- Capital: Las Tablas

Area
  - Total: 275 sq mi (711 km^{2})

Population (2020)
  - Total: 29,531
  - Density: 107/sq mi (41.5/km^{2})
- Time zone: UTC-5 (ETZ)

Las Tablas District is a district (distrito) of Los Santos Province in Panama. The population according to the 2000 census was 24,298. The district covers a total area of 698 square kilometres (269 sq mi). The capital lies at the city of Las Tablas.

== Administrative divisions ==
Las Tablas District is divided administratively into the following corregimientos:

- Santa Librada de Las Tablas (capital)
- Bajo Corral
- Bayano
- El Carate
- El Cocal
- El Manantial
- El Muñoz
- El Pedregoso
- La Laja
- La Miel
- La Palma
- La Tiza
- Las Palmitas
- Las Tablas Abajo
- Nuario
- Palmira
- Peña Blanca
- Río Hondo
- San José
- San Miguel
- Santo Domingo
- El Sesteadero
- Valle Rico
- Vallerriquito
