= Los Santos District =

- District
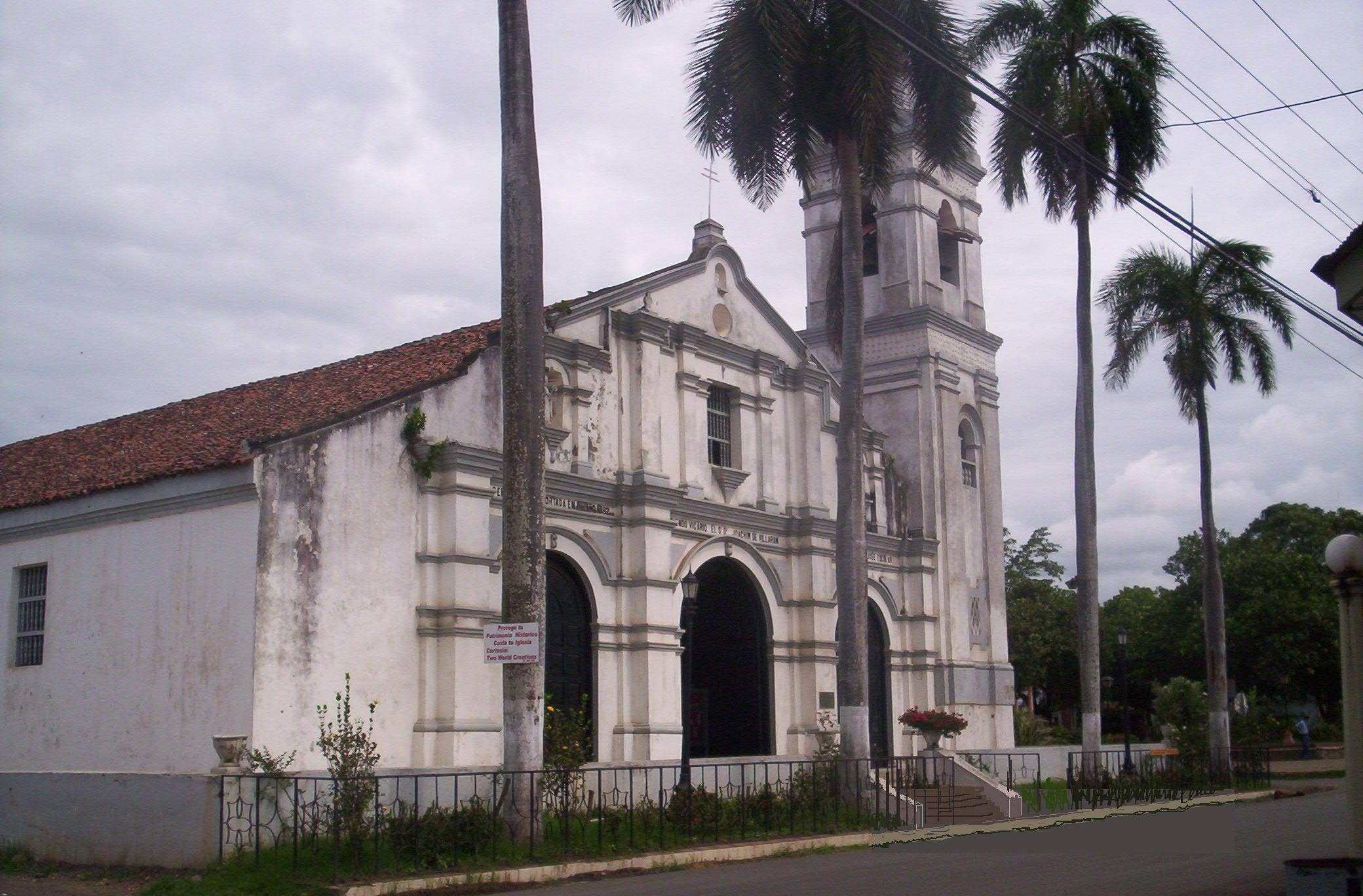
- La Villa de los Santos

- Flag Seal

- Location of the district capital in Panama
- Coordinates: 7°50′N 80°20′W
- Country: Panama
- Province: Los Santos Province
- Capital: La Villa de los Santos

Area
  - Total: 166 sq mi (429 km^{2})

Population (2020)
  - Total: 27,323
  - Density: 163/sq mi (63.1/km^{2})
- Time zone: UTC-5 (ETZ)

Los Santos District is a district (distrito) of Los Santos Province in Panama. The population according to the 2000 census was 23,828. The district covers a total area of 429 km^{2}. The capital lies at the city of La Villa de los Santos.

== Administrative divisions ==
Los Santos District is divided administratively into the following corregimientos:

- La Villa de los Santos (capital)
- El Guásimo
- La Colorada
- La Espigadilla
- Las Cruces
- Las Guabas
- Los Angeles
- Los Olivos
- Llano Largo
- Sabanagrande
- Santa Ana
- Tres Quebradas
- Villa Lourdes
- Agua Buena
- El Ejido
