= Lajami =

Lajami is a surname. Notable people with the surname include:

- Ali Lajami (born 1996), Saudi Arabian footballer
- Qassem Lajami (born 1996), Saudi Arabian footballer

== See also ==
- Lajamina
