= Guararé District =

- District

- Location of the district capital in Panama
- Coordinates: 7°49′12″N 80°16′12″W
- Country: Panama
- Province: Los Santos Province
- Capital: Guararé

Area
  - Total: 83 sq mi (216 km^{2})

Population (2020)
  - Total: 11,144
  - Density: 141.6/sq mi (54.68/km^{2})
- Time zone: UTC-5 (ETZ)

Guararé District is a district (distrito) of Los Santos Province in Panama. The population according to the 2000 census was 9,485. The district covers a total area of 216 km^{2} (83 sq mi). The capital lies at the city of Guararé.

== Administrative divisions ==
Guararé District is divided administratively into the following corregimientos:

- Guararé (capital)
- El Espinal
- El Macano
- Guararé Arriba
- La Enea
- La Pasera
- Las Trancas
- Llano Abajo
- El Hato
- Perales
