= Pocrí District =

- District
- Coat of arms

- Location of the district capital in Panama
- Coordinates: 8°16′12″N 80°33′0″W
- Country: Panama
- Province: Los Santos Province
- Capital: Pocrí

Area
  - Total: 110 sq mi (280 km^{2})

Population (2020)
  - Total: 3,484
  - Density: 32.2/sq mi (12.43/km^{2})
- Time zone: UTC-5 (ETZ)

Pocrí District is a district (distrito) of Los Santos Province in Panama. The population according to the 2000 census was 3,397. The district covers a total area of 280 km^{2}. The capital lies at the city of Pocrí, Los Santos.

== Administrative divisions ==
Pocrí District is divided administratively into the following corregimientos:

- Pocrí (capital)
- El Cañafístulo
- Lajamina
- Paraíso
- Paritilla
