= Macaracas District =

- District
- Coat of arms

- Location of the district capital in Panama
- Coordinates: 7°43′48″N 80°32′24″W
- Country: Panama
- Province: Los Santos Province
- Capital: Macaracas

Area
  - Total: 195 sq mi (504 km^{2})

Population (2020)
  - Total: 9,285
  - Density: 48/sq mi (18.4/km^{2})
- Time zone: UTC-5 (ETZ)

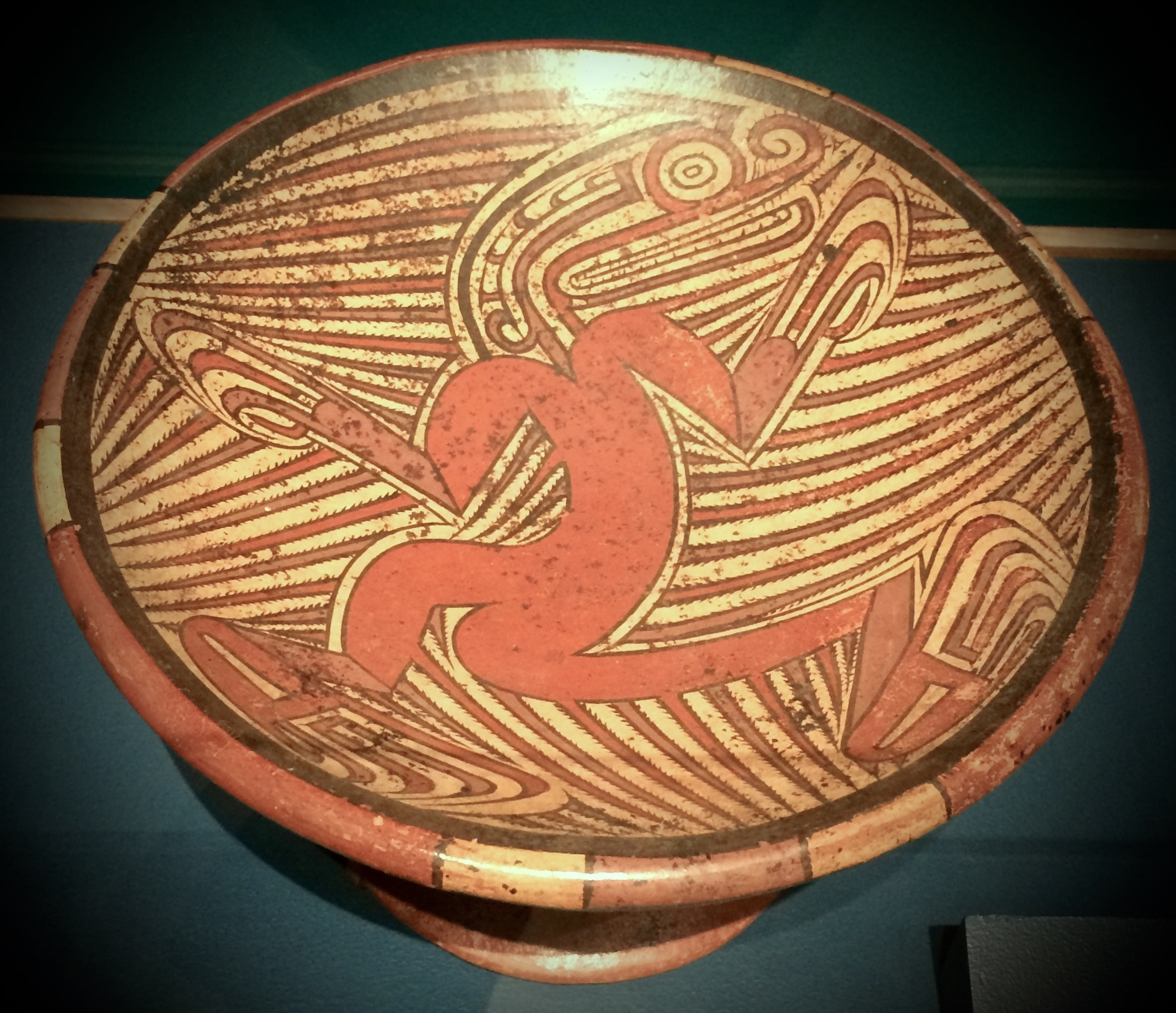
A Macaracas style Coclé bowl, from around 800-1000 AD. The background design is stingray spines.

Macaracas District is a district (distrito) of Los Santos Province in Panama. The population according to the 2000 census was 9,137. The district covers a total area of 504 km^{2} (195 sq mi). The capital lies at the city of Macaracas.

The Macaracas style of Gran Coclé Precolumbian pottery was named for archaeological sites found in this District.

== Administrative divisions ==
Macaracas District is divided administratively into the following corregimientos:

- Macaracas (capital)
- Bahía Honda
- Bajos de Guera
- Corozal
- Chupa
- El Cedro
- Espino Amarillo
- La Mesa
- Llano de Piedra
- Las Palmas
- Mogollón

...
