= Mariabé =

- Corregimiento
- Location within Panama
- Coordinates: 7.5833°N 80.0667°W
- Country: Panama
- Province: Los Santos
- District: Pedasí

Area
  - Land: 45.9 km^{2} (17.7 sq mi)

Population (2010)
  - Total: 319
  - Density: 6.9/km^{2} (18/sq mi)
- Population density calculated based on land area.
- Time zone: UTC−5 (EST)

Mariabé is a corregimiento in Pedasí District, Los Santos Province, Panama with a population of 319 as of 2010. Its population as of 1990 was 236; its population as of 2000 was 269.
