= Guararé Arriba =

- Corregimiento
- Location within Panama
- Coordinates: 7.8094°N 80.3604°W
- Country: Panama
- Province: Los Santos
- District: Guararé

Area
  - Land: 8.6 km^{2} (3.3 sq mi)

Population (2010)
  - Total: 394
  - Density: 45.6/km^{2} (118/sq mi)
- Population density calculated based on land area.
- Time zone: UTC−5 (EST)

Guararé Arriba is a corregimiento in Guararé District, Los Santos Province, Panama with a population of 394 as of 2010. Its population as of 1990 was 361; its population as of 2000 was 378.
