= El Manantial, Los Santos =

El Manantial
- Corregimiento
- Location within Panama
- Coordinates: 7.7833°N 80.2500°W
- Country: Panama
- Province: Los Santos
- District: Las Tablas

Area
  - Land: 27.4 km^{2} (10.6 sq mi)

Population (2010)
  - Total: 909
  - Density: 33.2/km^{2} (86/sq mi)
- Population density calculated based on land area.
- Time zone: UTC−5 (EST)

El Manantial is a corregimiento in Las Tablas District, Los Santos Province, Panama with a population of 909 as of 2010. Its population as of 1990 was 631; its population as of 2000 was 793.
