= Purio =

- Corregimiento
- Location within Panama
- Coordinates: 7.6000°N 80.0833°W
- Country: Panama
- Province: Los Santos
- District: Pedasí

Area
  - Land: 24 km^{2} (9.3 sq mi)

Population (2010)
  - Total: 494
  - Density: 20.6/km^{2} (53/sq mi)
- Population density calculated based on land area.
- Time zone: UTC−5 (EST)

Purio is a corregimiento in Pedasí District, Los Santos Province, Panama with a population of 494 as of 2010. Its population as of 1990 was 555; its population as of 2000 was 547.
