= El Pedregoso, Los Santos =

El Pedregoso
- Corregimiento
- Location within Panama
- Coordinates: 7.7000°N 80.3333°W
- Country: Panama
- Province: Los Santos
- District: Las Tablas

Area
  - Land: 7 km^{2} (2.7 sq mi)

Population (2010)
  - Total: 279
  - Density: 39.6/km^{2} (103/sq mi)
- Population density calculated based on land area.
- Time zone: UTC−5 (EST)

El Pedregoso is a corregimiento in Las Tablas District, Los Santos Province, Panama with a population of 279 as of 2010. Its population as of 1990 was 288; its population as of 2000 was 266.
