= La Palma, Los Santos =

La Palma
- Corregimiento
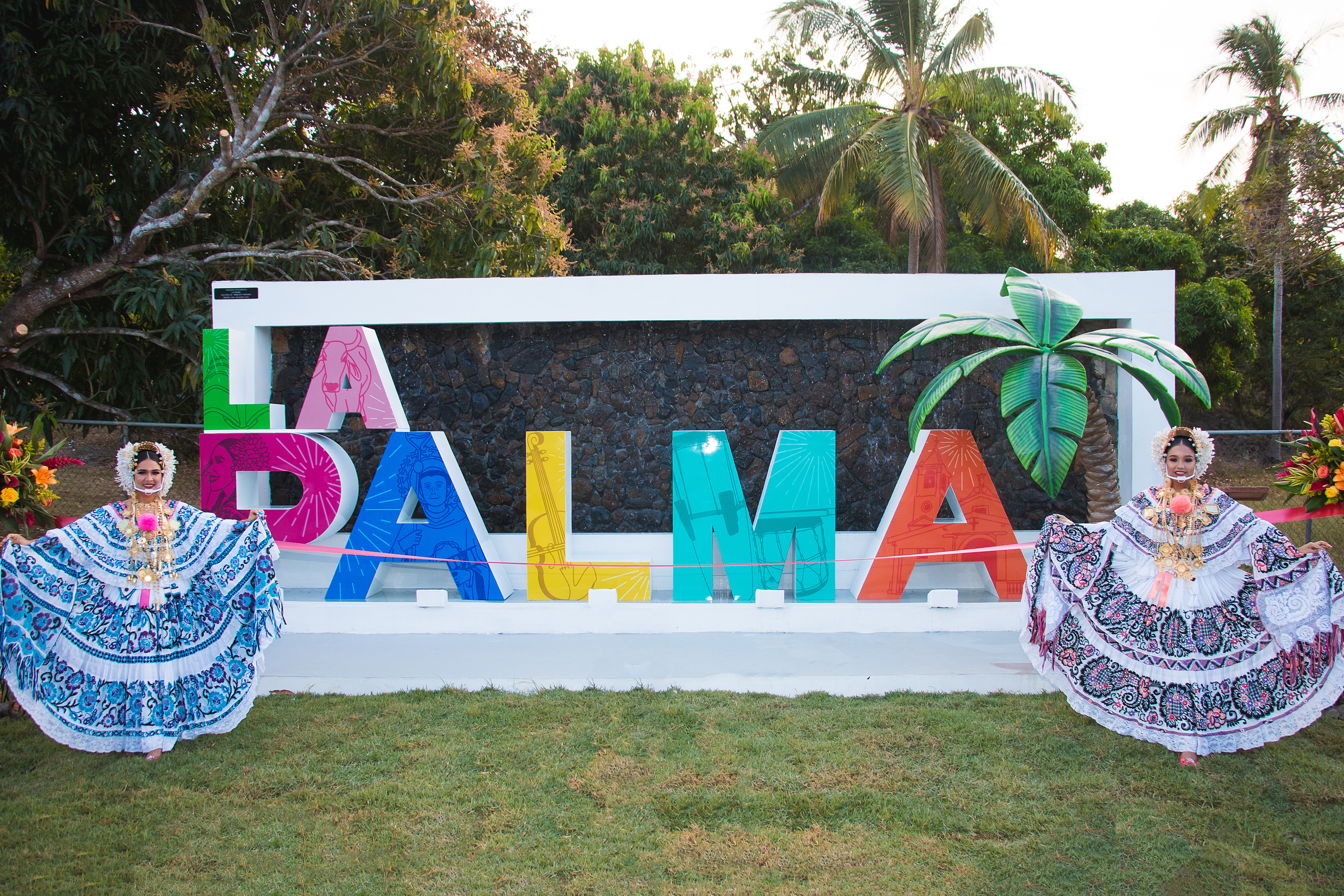
- La Palma welcome sign

- Location within Panama
- Coordinates: 7.5333°N 80.3333°W
- Country: Panama
- Province: Los Santos
- District: Las Tablas

Area
  - Land: 10.5 km^{2} (4.1 sq mi)

Population (2010)
  - Total: 1,247
  - Density: 118.6/km^{2} (307/sq mi)
- Population density calculated based on land area.
- Time zone: UTC−5 (EST)

La Palma is a corregimiento in Las Tablas District, Los Santos Province, Panama with a population of 1,247 as of 2010. Its population as of 1990 was 1,271; its population as of 2000 was 1,280.
