= El Sesteadero =

Coordinates: 7.7583°N 80.2592°W

Sesteadero
- Corregimiento
- Location within Panama
- Country: Panama
- Province: Los Santos
- District: Las Tablas

Area
  - Land: 4.3 km^{2} (1.7 sq mi)

Population (2010)
  - Total: 1,067
  - Density: 248.5/km^{2} (644/sq mi)
- Population density calculated based on land area.
- Time zone: UTC−5 (EST)

Sesteadero is a corregimiento in Las Tablas District, Los Santos Province, Panama with a population of 1,067 as of 2010. Its population as of 1990 was 801; its population as of 2000 was 869.
