= El Carate =

- Corregimiento
- Location within Panama
- Coordinates: 7.7333°N 80.3000°W
- Country: Panama
- Province: Los Santos
- District: Las Tablas

Area
  - Land: 17.7 km^{2} (6.8 sq mi)

Population (2010)
  - Total: 873
  - Density: 49.2/km^{2} (127/sq mi)
- Population density calculated based on land area.
- Time zone: UTC−5 (EST)

El Carate is a corregimiento in Las Tablas District, Los Santos Province, Panama with a population of 873 as of 2010. Its population as of 1990 was 723; its population as of 2000 was 831.
