= Corozal, Los Santos =

Coordinates: 7.7500°N 80.4833°W

Corozal
- Corregimiento
- Location within Panama
- Country: Panama
- Province: Los Santos
- District: Macaracas

Area
  - Land: 24.7 km^{2} (9.5 sq mi)

Population (2010)
  - Total: 625
  - Density: 25.4/km^{2} (66/sq mi)
- Population density calculated based on land area.
- Time zone: UTC−5 (EST)

Corozal is a corregimiento in Macaracas District, Los Santos Province, Panama with a population of 625 as of 2010. Its population as of 1990 was 591; its population as of 2000 was 569.
