= La Pasera =

- Corregimiento
- Location within Panama
- Coordinates: 7.7995°N 80.3011°W
- Country: Panama
- Province: Los Santos
- District: Guararé

Area
  - Land: 20.6 km^{2} (8.0 sq mi)

Population (2010)
  - Total: 897
  - Density: 43.5/km^{2} (113/sq mi)
- Population density calculated based on land area.
- Time zone: UTC−5 (EST)

La Pasera is a corregimiento in Guararé District, Los Santos Province, Panama with a population of 897 as of 2010. Its population as of 1990 was 1,007; its population as of 2000 was 780.
