= Espino Amarillo =

Coordinates: 7.6833°N 80.4333°W

- Corregimiento
- Location within Panama
- Country: Panama
- Province: Los Santos
- District: Macaracas

Area
  - Land: 27 km^{2} (10 sq mi)

Population (2010)
  - Total: 193
  - Density: 7.2/km^{2} (19/sq mi)
- Population density calculated based on land area.
- Time zone: UTC−5 (EST)

Espino Amarillo is a corregimiento in Macaracas District, Los Santos Province, Panama with a population of 193 as of 2010. Its population as of 1990 was 254; its population as of 2000 was 209.
