= Guánico =

Coordinates: 7.3167°N 80.4167°W

- Corregimiento
- Location within Panama
- Country: Panama
- Province: Los Santos
- District: Tonosí

Area
  - Land: 209.2 km^{2} (80.8 sq mi)

Population (2010)
  - Total: 996
  - Density: 4.8/km^{2} (12/sq mi)
- Population density calculated based on land area.
- Time zone: UTC−5 (EST)

Guánico is a corregimiento in Tonosí District, Los Santos Province, Panama with a population of 996 as of 2010. Its population as of 1990 was 1,477; its population as of 2000 was 1,006.
