= San Miguel, Los Santos =

Coordinates: 7.6500°N 80.2667°W

San Miguel
- Corregimiento
- Location within Panama
- Country: Panama
- Province: Los Santos
- District: Las Tablas

Area
  - Land: 10 km^{2} (3.9 sq mi)

Population (2010)
  - Total: 116
  - Density: 11.6/km^{2} (30/sq mi)
- Population density calculated based on land area.
- Time zone: UTC−5 (EST)

San Miguel is a corregimiento in Las Tablas District, Los Santos Province, Panama with a population of 116 as of 2010. Its population as of 1990 was 160; its population as of 2000 was 112.
