= Villa Lourdes =

- Corregimiento
- Country: Panama
- Province: Los Santos
- District: Los Santos
- Established: July 29, 1998

Area
  - Land: 27.5 km^{2} (10.6 sq mi)

Population (2010)
  - Total: 1,075
  - Density: 39.2/km^{2} (102/sq mi)
- Population density calculated based on land area.
- Time zone: UTC−5 (EST)

Villa Lourdes is a corregimiento in Los Santos District, Los Santos Province, Panama with a population of 1,075 as of 2010. It was created by Law 58 of July 29, 1998, owing to the Declaration of Unconstitutionality of Law 1 of 1982. Its population as of 2000 was 995.
