= Agua Buena =

- Corregimiento
- Location within Panama
- Coordinates: 7°50′15″N 80°24′01″W
- Country: Panama
- Province: Los Santos
- District: Los Santos
- Established: July 29, 1998

Area
  - Land: 10.1 km^{2} (3.9 sq mi)

Population (2010)
  - Total: 1,117
  - Density: 111.1/km^{2} (288/sq mi)
- Population density calculated based on land area.
- Time zone: UTC−5 (EST)

Agua Buena is a corregimiento in Los Santos District, Los Santos Province, Panama with a population of 1,117 as of 2010. It was created by Law 58 of July 29, 1998, owing to the Declaration of Unconstitutionality of Law 1 of 1982. Its population as of 2000 was 1,117.
