= Los Ángeles, Los Santos =

Coordinates: 7.8897°N 80.3574°W

Los Angeles Santos
- Corregimiento
- Location within Panama
- Country: Panama
- Province: Los Santos
- District: Los Santos

Area
  - Land: 21.9 km^{2} (8.5 sq mi)

Population (2010)
  - Total: 868
  - Density: 39.6/km^{2} (103/sq mi)
- Population density calculated based on land area.
- Time zone: UTC−5 (EST)

Los Ángeles is a corregimiento in Los Santos District, Los Santos Province, Panama with a population of 868 as of 2010. Its population as of 1990 was 780; its population as of 2000 was 878.apellidos conocidos Sáez, Mendieta, Castillo, Osorio
