= Valle Rico =

Coordinates: 7.6167°N 80.3500°W

- Corregimiento
- Location within Panama
- Country: Panama
- Province: Los Santos
- District: Las Tablas

Area
  - Land: 41.4 km^{2} (16.0 sq mi)

Population (2010)
  - Total: 400
  - Density: 9.7/km^{2} (25/sq mi)
- Population density calculated based on land area.
- Time zone: UTC−5 (EST)

Valle Rico is a corregimiento in Las Tablas District, Los Santos Province, Panama with a population of 400 as of 2010. Its population as of 1990 was 417; its population as of 2000 was 452.

== Climate ==
Climate data for Valle Rico 2001–2015
Month	Jan	Feb	Mar	Apr	May	Jun	Jul	Aug	Sep	Oct	Nov	Dec	Year
Mean daily maximum °C (°F)	30.4 (86.7)	31.2 (88.2)	31.8 (89.2)	32.1 (89.8)	31.3 (88.3)	30.2 (86.4)	30.2 (86.4)	30.1 (86.2)	30.1 (86.2)	29.7 (85.5)	29.9 (85.8)	30.3 (86.5)	30.6 (87.1)
Daily mean °C (°F)	25.9 (78.6)	26.5 (79.7)	27.1 (80.8)	27.4 (81.3)	26.6 (79.9)	25.7 (78.3)	25.7 (78.3)	25.7 (78.3)	25.6 (78.1)	25.3 (77.5)	25.5 (77.9)	25.8 (78.4)	26.1 (78.9)
Mean daily minimum °C (°F)	21.4 (70.5)	21.8 (71.2)	22.3 (72.1)	22.6 (72.7)	21.9 (71.4)	21.2 (70.2)	21.2 (70.2)	21.2 (70.2)	21.1 (70.0)	20.9 (69.6)	21.0 (69.8)	21.3 (70.3)	21.5 (70.7)
Average rainfall mm (inches)	16.6 (0.65)	2.5 (0.10)	15.2 (0.60)	40.0 (1.57)	176.4 (6.94)	206.5 (8.13)	160.8 (6.33)	210.3 (8.28)	246.6 (9.71)	325.6 (12.82)	250.2 (9.85)	88.1 (3.47)	1,738.8 (68.45)
Source 1: INEC
Source 2: IMHPA
