= Nuario =

- Corregimiento
- Location within Panama
- Coordinates: 7.5333°N 80.3333°W
- Country: Panama
- Province: Los Santos
- District: Las Tablas

Area
  - Land: 101.1 km^{2} (39.0 sq mi)

Population (2010)
  - Total: 182
  - Density: 1.8/km^{2} (4.7/sq mi)
- Population density calculated based on land area.
- Time zone: UTC−5 (EST)

Nuario is a corregimiento in Las Tablas District, Los Santos Province, Panama with a population of 182 as of 2010. Its population as of 1990 was 229; its population as of 2000 was 195.
