= El Cocal =

- Corregimiento
- Location within Panama
- Coordinates: 7.7333°N 80.2833°W
- Country: Panama
- Province: Los Santos
- District: Las Tablas

Area
  - Land: 7.2 km^{2} (2.8 sq mi)

Population (2010)
  - Total: 1,889
  - Density: 264.2/km^{2} (684/sq mi)
- Population density calculated based on land area.
- Time zone: UTC−5 (EST)

El Cocal is a corregimiento in Las Tablas District, Los Santos Province, Panama with a population of 1,889 as of 2010. Its population as of 1990 was 1,239; its population as of 2000 was 1,486. El Cocal is also called Cacal.
