= Man Creek =

Coordinates: 8°55′N 82°04′W

- Corregimiento
- Interactive map of Man Creek
- Country: Panama
- Comarca Indígena: Ngäbe-Buglé Comarca
- District: Kankintú
- Time zone: UTC−5 (EST)

Man Creek is a corregimiento in Ngäbe-Buglé Comarca in the Republic of Panama.
