= La Espigadilla =

- Corregimiento
- Location within Panama
- Coordinates: 7°52′48″N 80°24′0″W
- Country: Panama
- Province: Los Santos
- District: Los Santos

Area
  - Land: 28.1 km^{2} (10.8 sq mi)

Population (2010)
  - Total: 1,675
  - Density: 59.7/km^{2} (155/sq mi)
- Population density calculated based on land area.
- Time zone: UTC−5 (EST)

La Espigadilla is a corregimiento in Los Santos District, Los Santos Province, Panama with a population of 1,675 as of 2010. Its population as of 1990 was 1,423; its population as of 2000 was 1,580.
