= Valle Bonito =

- Corregimiento
- Interactive map of Valle Bonito
- Location within Panama
- Coordinates: 8°39′38″N 81°46′45″W
- Country: Panama
- Comarca Indígena: Ngäbe-Buglé Comarca
- District: Kusapín

Area
  - Land: 257.1 km^{2} (99.3 sq mi)

Population
  - Total: 2,898
- Time zone: UTC−5 (EST)

Valle Bonito is a corregimiento in Ngäbe-Buglé Comarca in the Republic of Panama.
