= Sabanagrande, Los Santos =

Coordinates: 7.8333°N 80.3667°W

Sabanagrande
- Corregimiento
- Location within Panama
- Country: Panama
- Province: Los Santos
- District: Los Santos

Area
  - Land: 34.8 km^{2} (13.4 sq mi)

Population (2010)
  - Total: 1,909
  - Density: 54.8/km^{2} (142/sq mi)
- Population density calculated based on land area.
- Time zone: UTC−5 (EST)

Sabanagrande is a corregimiento in Los Santos District, Los Santos Province, Panama with a population of 1,909 as of 2010. Its population as of 1990 was 1,724; its population as of 2000 was 1,821.
