= Peña Blanca, Los Santos =

Peña Blanca
- Corregimiento
- Location within Panama
- Coordinates: 7.7167°N 80.2833°W
- Country: Panama
- Province: Los Santos
- District: Las Tablas

Area
  - Land: 8 km^{2} (3.1 sq mi)

Population (2010)
  - Total: 875
  - Density: 109.7/km^{2} (284/sq mi)
- Population density calculated based on land area.
- Time zone: UTC−5 (EST)

Peña Blanca is a corregimiento in Las Tablas District, Los Santos Province, Panama with a population of 875 as of 2010. Its population as of 1990 was 582; its population as of 2000 was 750.
