= Vallerriquito =

Coordinates: 7.6167°N 80.3167°W

- Corregimiento
- Location within Panama
- Country: Panama
- Province: Los Santos
- District: Las Tablas

Area
  - Land: 39 km^{2} (15 sq mi)

Population (2010)
  - Total: 277
  - Density: 7.1/km^{2} (18/sq mi)
- Population density calculated based on land area.
- Time zone: UTC−5 (EST)

Vallerriquito is a corregimiento in Las Tablas District, Los Santos Province, Panama with a population of 277 as of 2010. Its population as of 1990 was 326; its population as of 2000 was 301.

== Notable people ==
- Herasto Reyes
