= Las Trancas =

- Village and corregimiento
- Location within Panama
- Coordinates: 7.733°N 80.367°W
- Country: Panama
- Province: Los Santos
- District: Guararé

Area
  - Land: 29.2 km^{2} (11.3 sq mi)

Population (2010)
  - Total: 511
  - Density: 17.5/km^{2} (45/sq mi)
- Population density calculated based on land area.
- Time zone: UTC−5 (EST)

Las Trancas is a village and corregimiento in Guararé District, Los Santos Province, Panama with a population of 511 as of 2010. It lies between Las Tablas and Pedasí. Its population as of 1990 was 605; its population as of 2000 was 525. It is celebrated for its Festival de la Candelaria, a religious ceremony held on 2 February every year, with folk dancing and music.
