= Los Santos Province =

Province of Panama

Coordinates: 7°56′N 80°25′W

Los Santos Provincia de Los Santos
- Province
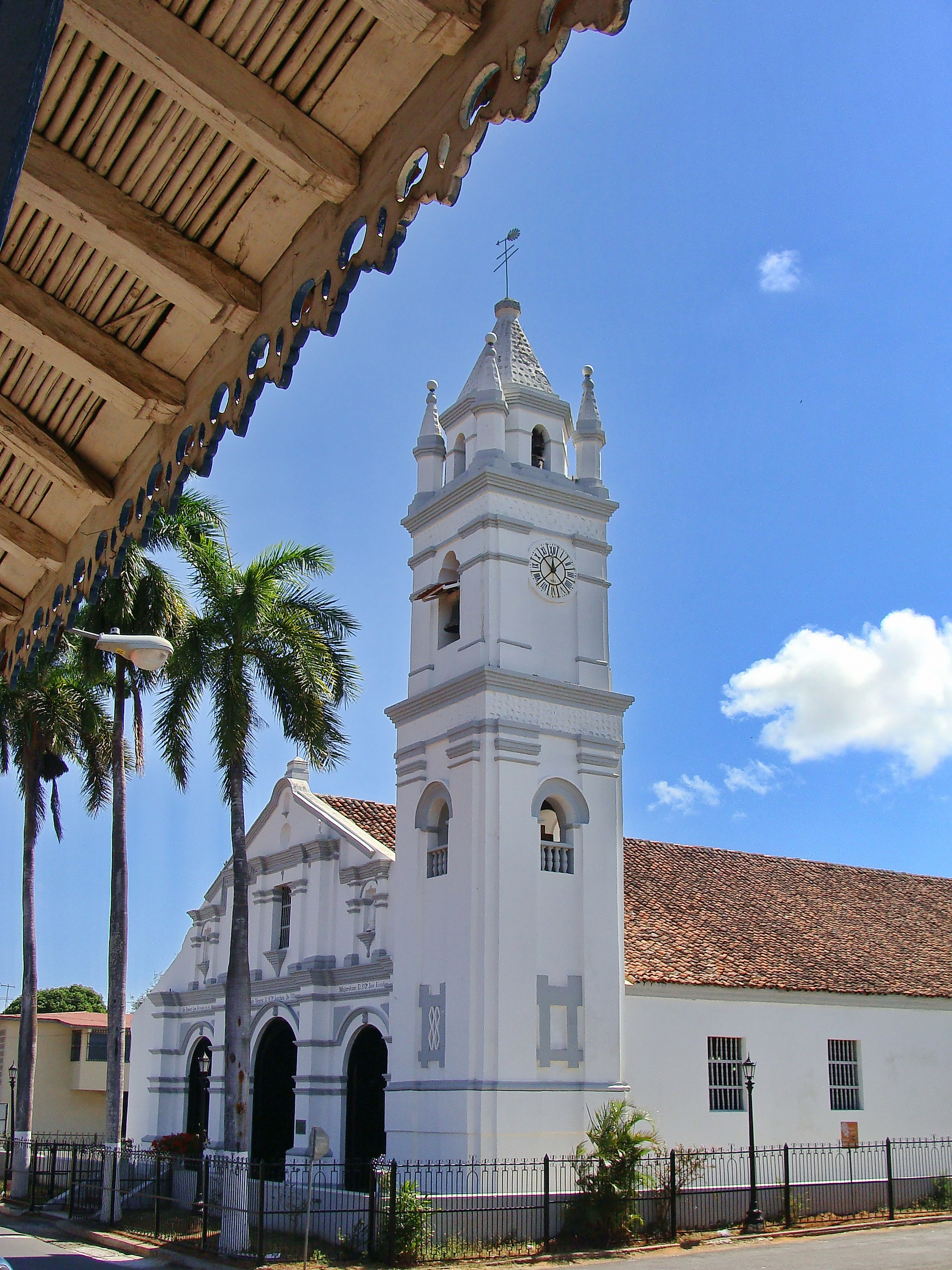
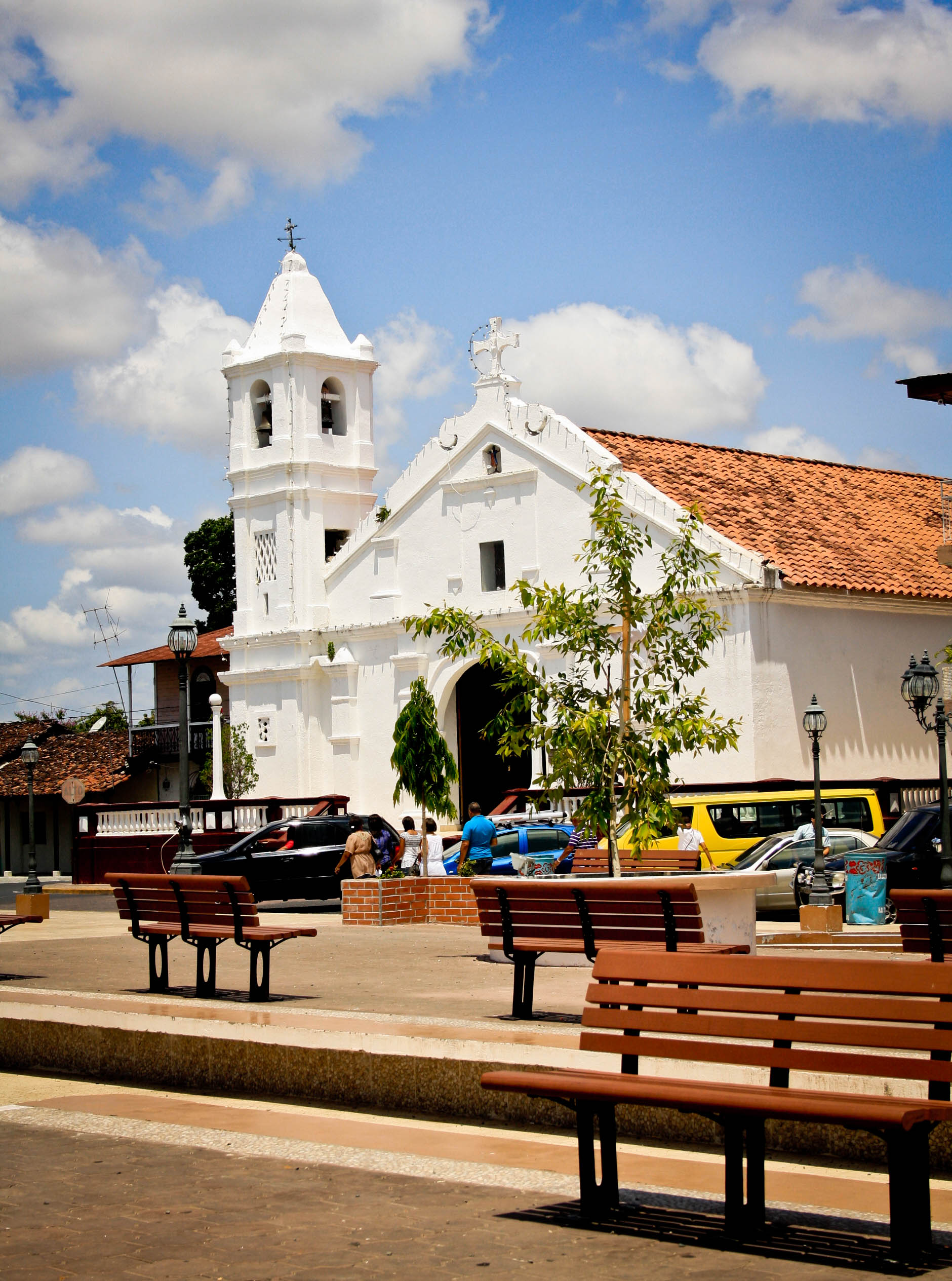
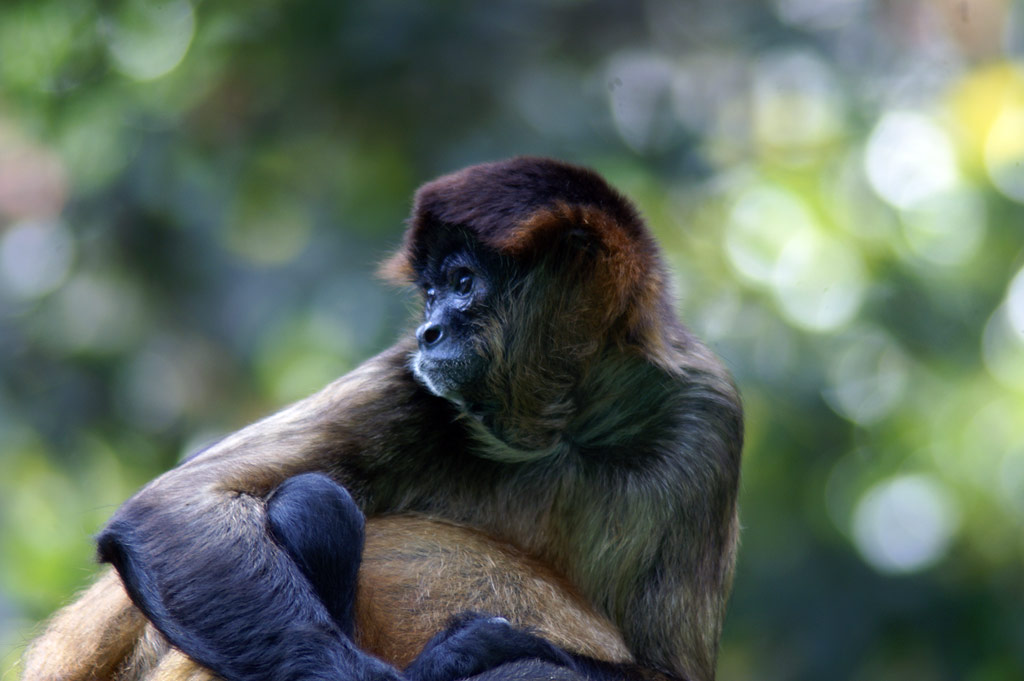
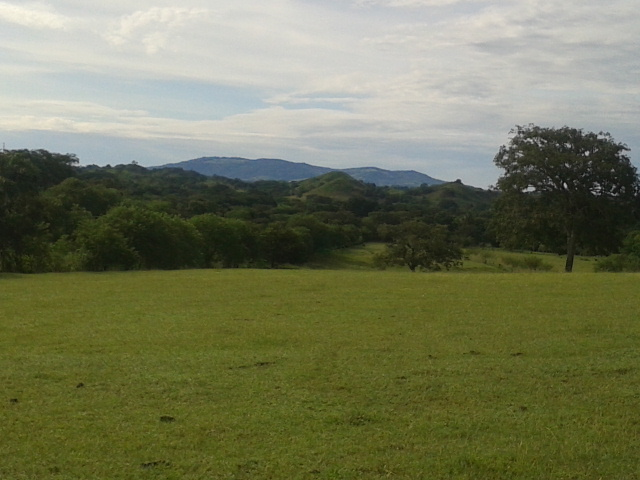
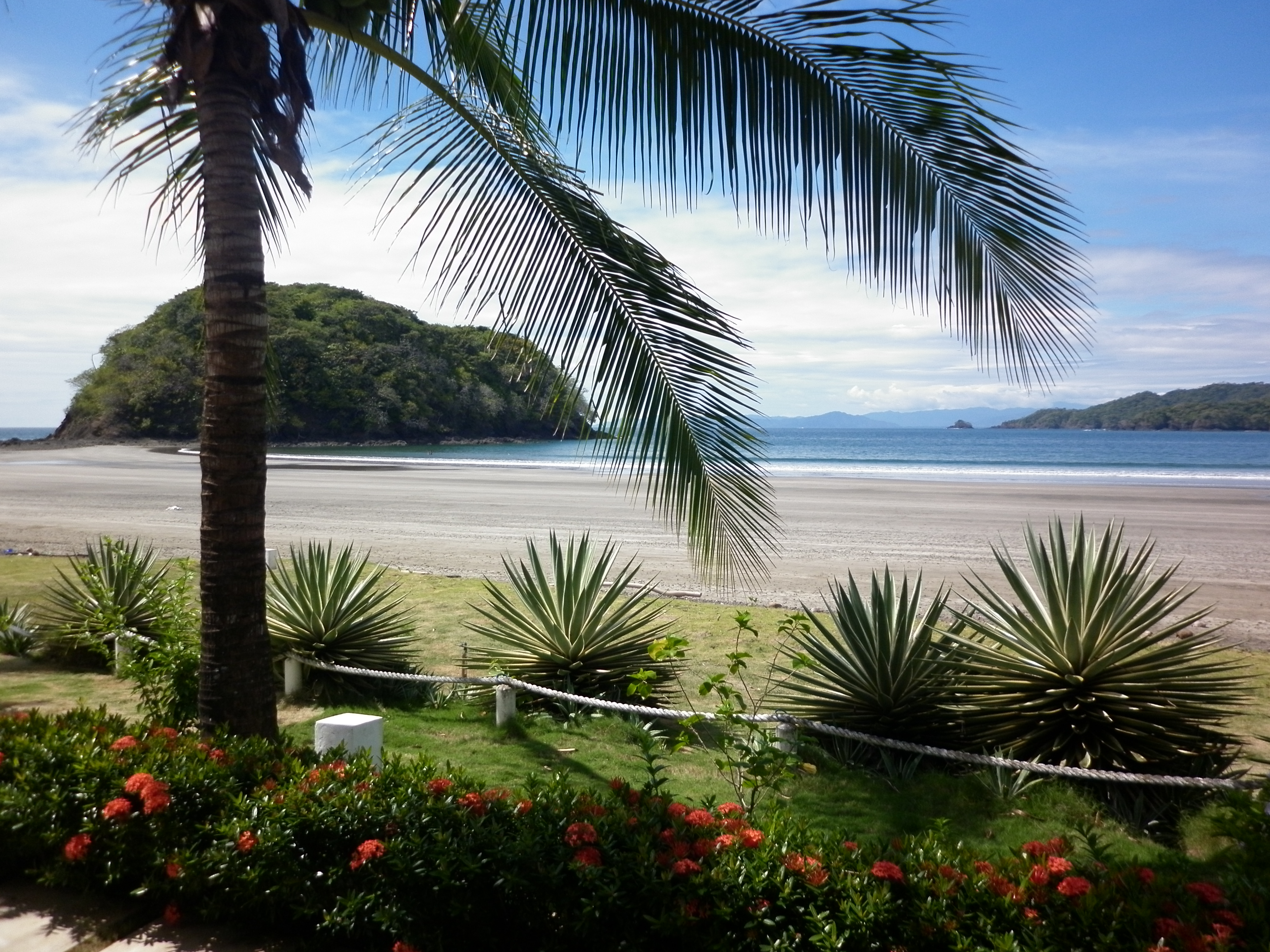
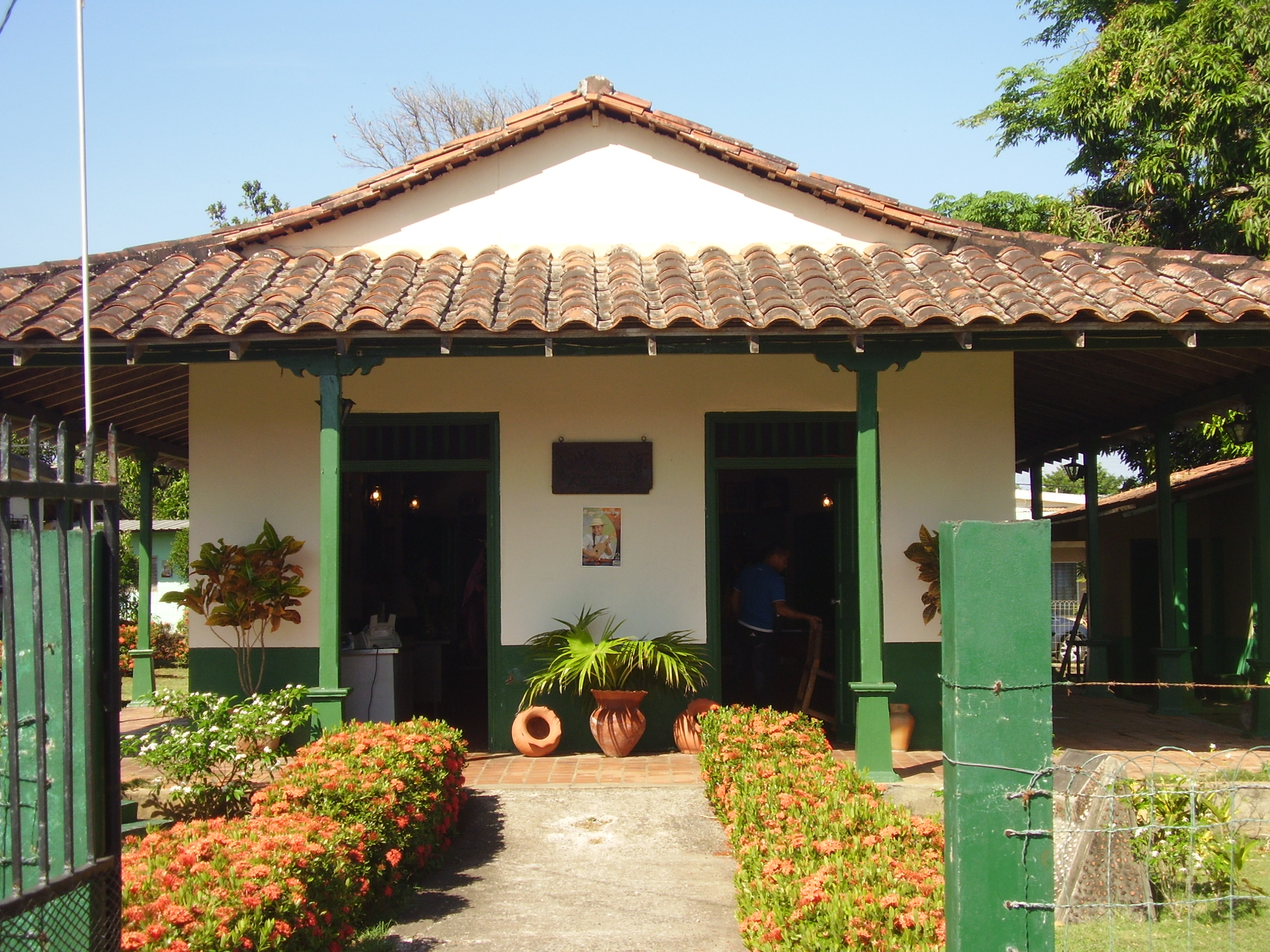
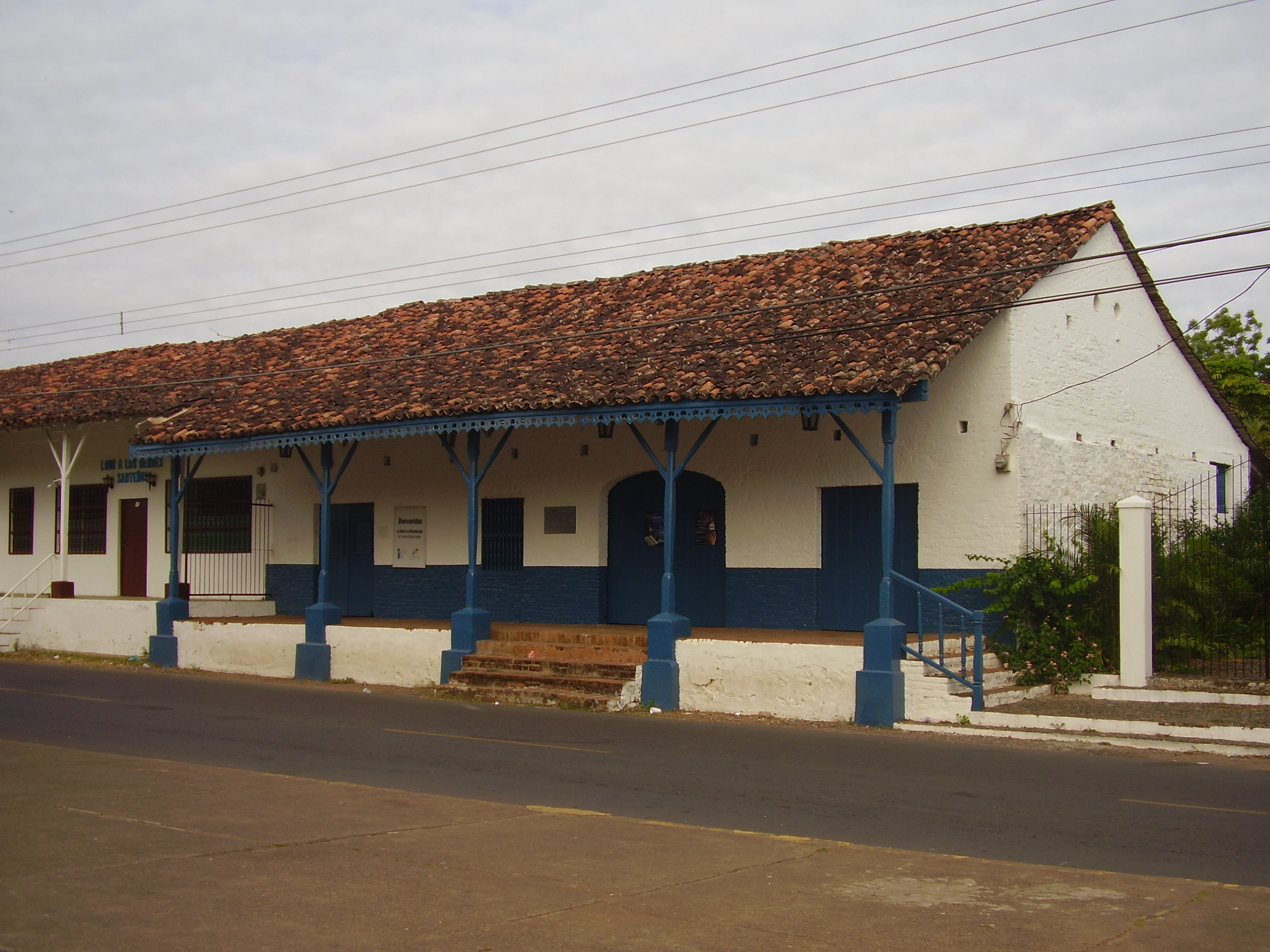
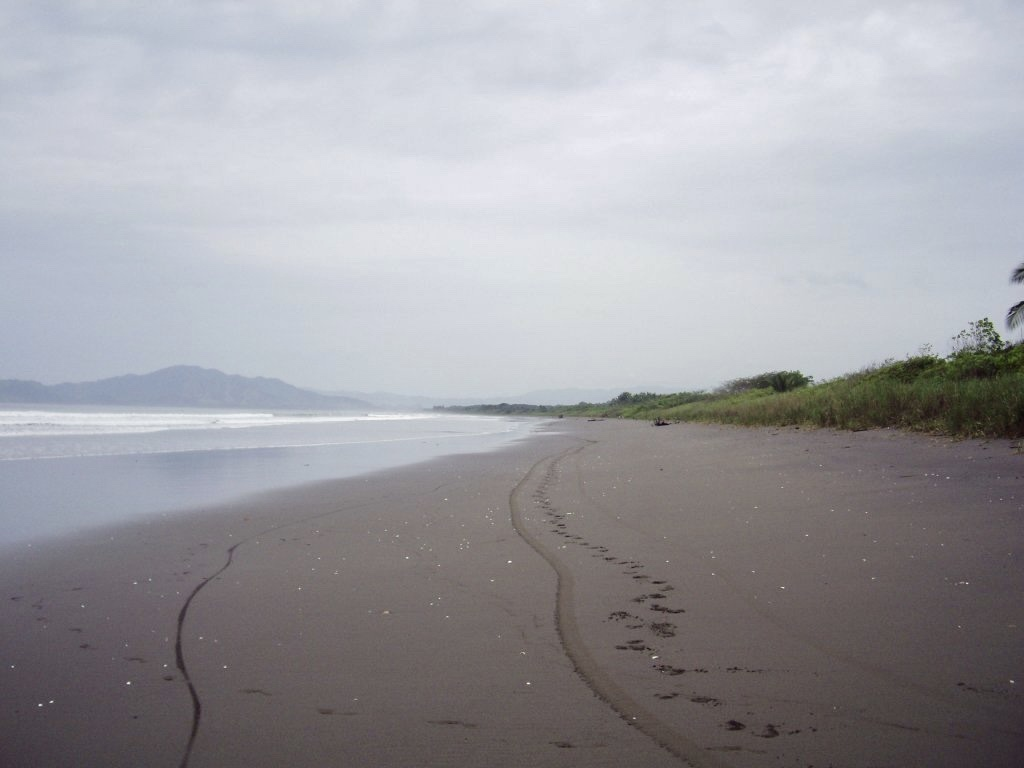
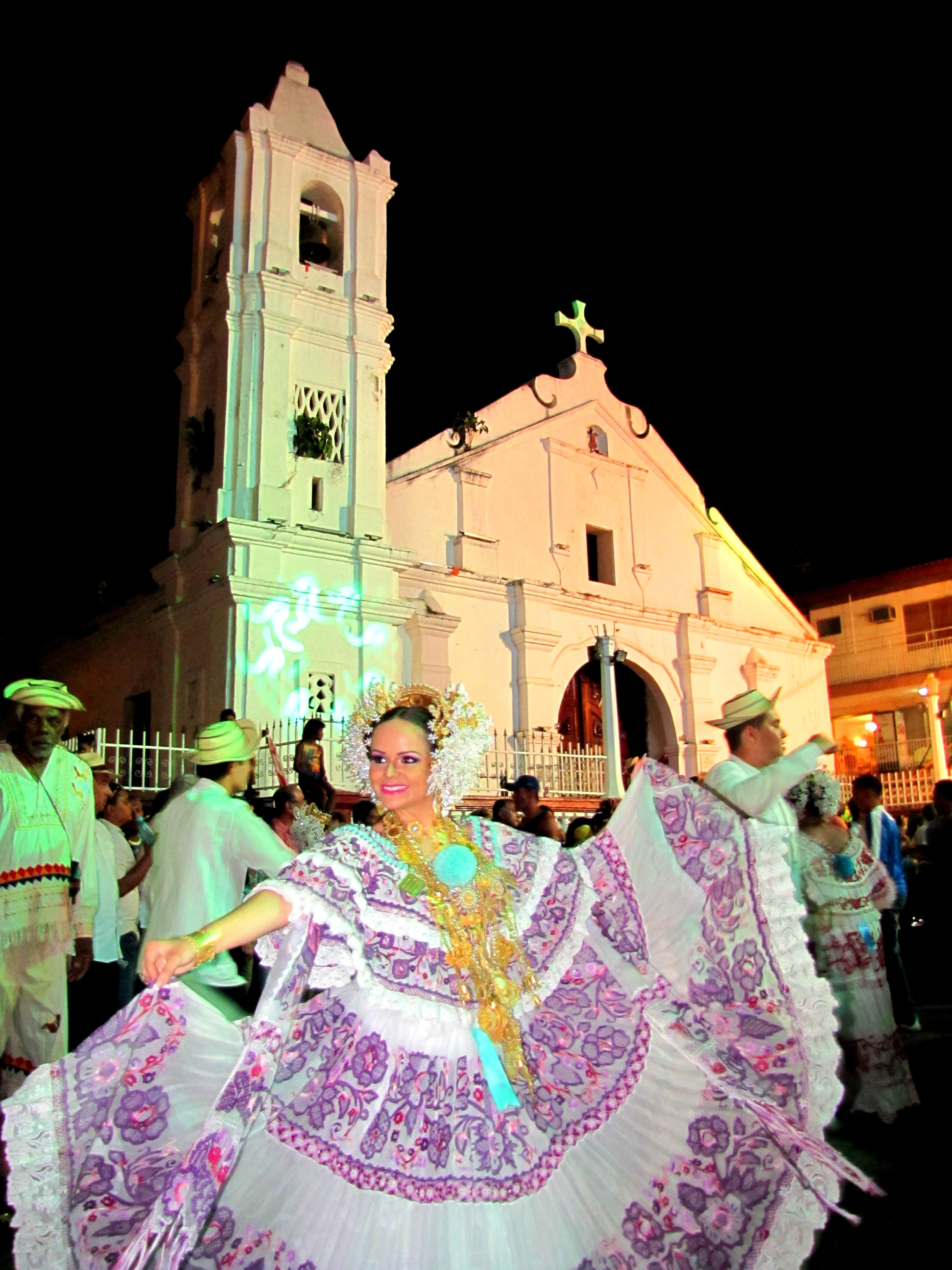
- From top, left to right: view of San Atanasio church in Los Santos, view of downtown Las Tablas by the church of Santa Librada, Ateles geoffroyi azuerensis, Cerro del Canajagua, a beach in Pedasi, Casa Museo Manuel F. Zárate, Museo de la Nacionalidad in Los Santos, a natural landscape of Tonosi coast at Las Canas, Empollerada in Las Tablas.

- Flag

- Country: Panama
- Capital city: Las Tablas

Government
  - Governor: Rubén Villarreal

Area
  - Total: 3,809.4 km^{2} (1,470.8 sq mi)

Population (2023 census)
  - Total: 98,466
  - Density: 25.848/km^{2} (66.946/sq mi)
- Demonym: Santeño (a)

GDP (PPP, constant 2015 values)
  - Year: 2023
  - Total: $2.4 billion
  - Per capita: $27,100
- Time zone: UTC-5 (Eastern Time)
- ISO 3166 code: PA-7
- HDI (2017): 0.813; Very high

Los Santos (Spanish pronunciation: [los ˈsantos]) is a province in Panama, reaching from the La Villa River in the north to the Pacific Ocean in the south and east. It is part of the Azuero Peninsula, bounded by the province of Herrera to the north and northeast, and by Mariato District of Veraguas Province to the West. The City of Las Tablas is the capital and most populous city. There are seven administrative districts under the jurisdiction of Los Santos Province. Los Santos's area is 3,809.4 km ², and its population is 98,466 inhabitants in 2023.

In this region are the oldest human settlements in the Isthmus of Panama. It was part of the cultural region of Gran Cocle where one of the first ceramic styles of the Americas developed. The first Europeans to explore Los Santos were the Spanish in 1515 under the command of Gonzalo de Badajoz. Upon the arrival of Europeans the area was ruled by the cacique Antataura or Cutara, and was known as the Land of Mr. Paris or Parita from Ngäbere Bari-ta meaning Confederation of Peoples, having under his control six other Indigenous chiefdoms: Guararí, Quemá, Chiracoitia, Huere, Guanata and Usagaña. The only province that was not under his dominion was Escoria. Gaspar de Espinosa succeeded in conquering and annexing Pariba to the Spanish Empire in 1516, decimating nearly all of the native population.

Geographically, Los Santos is located in the 'Arco Seco', name given to the strip of land between the Gulf of Panama and the Central Mountain range which includes areas of the provinces of Coclé, Herrera and Veraguas in the south of the Isthmus of Panama. Its climate is mainly a tropical savanna climate with moderate temperatures, strongly influenced by the winds of the Pacific Ocean crashing against the mountains, and the Humboldt Current. The average annual rainfall is 1,200 mm, allowing the growth of either dry or humid rainforest. Its highest point is located at the peak of Cerro Hoya with 1559 metres. Other major peaks are Cambutal hill (1400 metres) and Mount The Ñopos (1068 metres).

The modern province of Los Santos, was created in January 1945 replacing the defunct province of Azuero according to Cabinet Decree No. 13, leaving its territorial regime regulated by the second chapter of the Law 58 of July 29, 1998, losing the Territory of Quebro in this process.

Although Los Santos closely shares its political and social history with the rest of Panama, and the vast majority of the population speaks Spanish, the province has retained a distinct cultural identity. Los Santos' culture is the result of the passage of different peoples and civilizations that, over time, have shaped a particular cultural identity. These people, some very different from each other, have been slowly leaving an imprint seated among the inhabitants. It is one of the last regions in Panama where Spanish voseo is the standard form for use.

== Toponymy ==
As is common in most of Panama, the province took its name from its ancient capital, La Villa de Los Santos. Founded on November 1569, All Saints' Day, takes its name from this Catholic celebration. The Day of All Saints is a Christian tradition instituted in honor of All Saints, known and unknown, as Pope Urban IV, to compensate for any lack of the feasts of the saints during the year by the faithful. It has roots in the Celtic festival of Samhain or Samain. The Saints (<Latin sanctus, -i; ['chosen by God']) are distinguished men and women in the various religious traditions for their alleged special relationship with the gods.

== Symbols ==
Coat of arm of the House of Colon

La Villa de Los Santos Flag

The official Sports flag of Los Santos is composed of the colors orange and black, adorned with seven stars representing the seven districts of the province of Los Santos.

The flag consists of three equal horizontal stripes, coloured red, blue and yellow respectively. It is based on the chromatic composition created in 1801 by Francisco Miranda, precursor of Latin American independence, who flew the pavilion in Jacmel, Haiti for the first time. As to the meaning of the colors, the most accepted hypothesis states that it is based on the primary colors as perceived by the iris. A second theory states that it is based on the colors of the primitive coat of arms of Christopher Columbus; and lastly, a third theory says that it is based on the colors of the uniforms of the Burgerwache in Hamburg. The first theory is based in a letter, where Miranda describes a conversation with Johann Wolfgang von Goethe about its Theory of colours at a party hosted in the city of Weimar in 1785. The santeños Patriots took this model to represent Los Santos in 1821 in the battle to gain independence from Spain. With the creation of the province of Azuero on April 4, 1850 this flag became the official flag of the province and subsequently, became the official flag of Los Santos province, heir of the former Azuero province.

== Climate ==
Located in the tropics, Los Santos has a rainy season which stretches from May to November, and a dry season extending from late December to early May. According to the Köppen climate classification, the province of Los Santos has a tropical savanna climate (Aw). The southeast of Los Santos is usually warmer and drier than the west, owing to the influence of Pacific Ocean currents and altitude. Rainfall varies widely across Los Santos. The eastern highlands of Los Santos are the wettest, with annual rainfall in a few places like Cerro Hoya and Canajagua exceeding 4,000 millimetres or 157 inches. In comparison, much of lowland Los Santos receives less than 1,200 millimetres (47 in) annually. Temperatures range between 23 and 32 °C (73.4 and 89.6 °F) on the coast, with a minimum of 14 °C (57.2 °F) in the mountain region. These variations are caused by the mountains of Azuero range and rainfall that occur over very short distances.

Climate data for Los Santos, Panama (1984–2014) data
Month	Jan	Feb	Mar	Apr	May	Jun	Jul	Aug	Sep	Oct	Nov	Dec	Year
Mean daily maximum °C (°F)	33.6 (92.5)	34.1 (93.4)	34.8 (94.6)	35.4 (95.7)	35.4 (95.7)	34.4 (93.9)	34.0 (93.2)	34.3 (93.7)	34.0 (93.2)	33.8 (92.8)	33.5 (92.3)	35.4 (95.7)	35.4 (95.7)
Mean daily minimum °C (°F)	18.8 (65.8)	19.2 (66.6)	19.9 (67.8)	21.0 (69.8)	22.0 (71.6)	21.7 (71.1)	21.1 (70.0)	21.2 (70.2)	21.0 (69.8)	21.2 (70.2)	20.5 (68.9)	19.7 (67.5)	19.2 (66.6)
Average rainfall mm (inches)	12.1 (0.48)	0.7 (0.03)	3.7 (0.15)	21.1 (0.83)	111.2 (4.38)	137.3 (5.41)	96.6 (3.80)	123.2 (4.85)	161.6 (6.36)	224.8 (8.85)	126.0 (4.96)	46.6 (1.83)	1,064.9 (41.93)
Average rainy days	1.1	0.2	0.3	1.8	7.8	11.5	9	10.5	12.8	14.4	10.3	4.2	83.9
Source 1:
Source 2:

== Geography and natural history ==
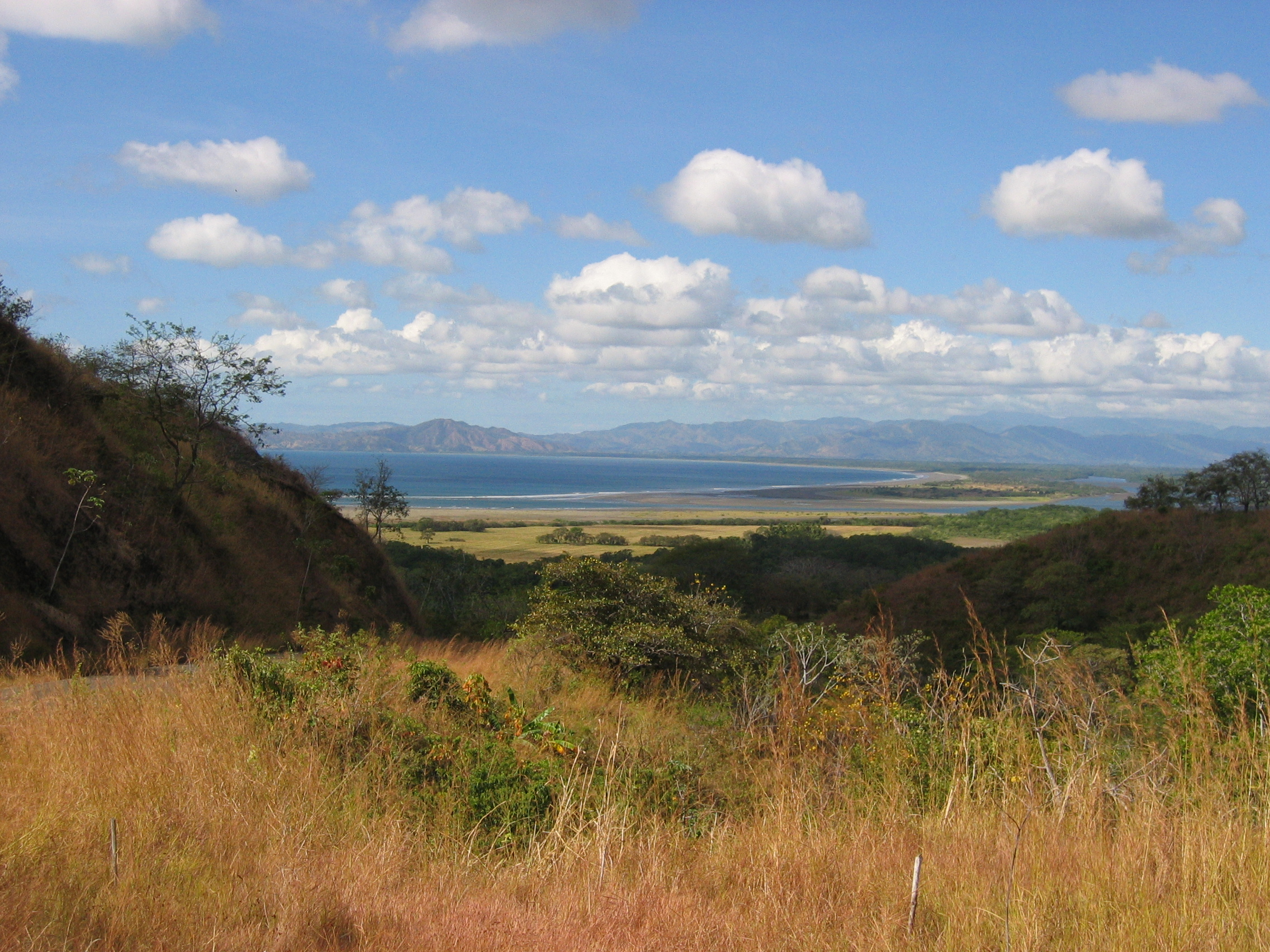
South coast of Azuero peninsula in Los Santos

The mainland of Los Santos comprises most of the southern portion of the Azuero Peninsula, which lies in the south of Panama and two main islands, Iguana Island and Cañas Island, and the small Isla Frailes del Norte and Isla Frailes del Sur. The total area is 3,809.4 km2 with 214 km2 of coast shores, comparable to the size of Cape Verde. Los Santos's border with Herrera to the north, runs along La Villa river, which exerts a natural border, although both sides of the river show the same landscape. The Pacific Ocean borders the south and east with a large area of coastline, giving it a major maritime landscape. Finally, Mariato District west border is characterized by its mountainous natural shape, separating the Gulf of Montijo in Veraguas from the valleys of Tonosi.

=== Relief ===
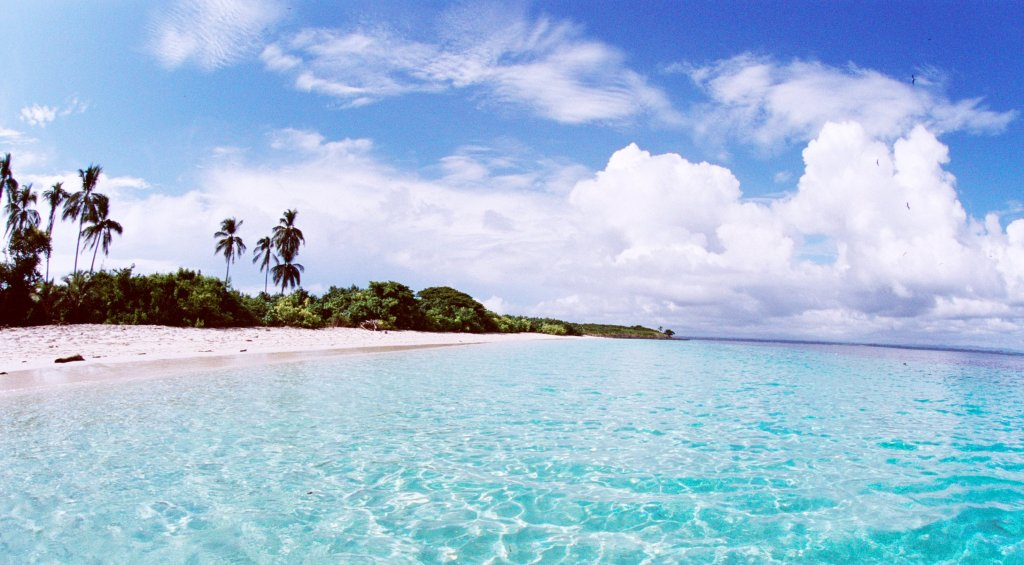
White sand beach in Isla Iguana

Los Santos is in the Azuero Peninsula in the Isthmus of Panama. The major geographical features of the province are determined by three morphostructural regions which are characterized by its elevations. It is clearly divided into three zones: the mountainous area dominated by the Azuero mountain ranges: Western Azuero range and Eastern Azuero range, known locally as sierra de Azuero. The mountains are an extension of the Cordillera Central extending south until its extinction in coastal Búcaro and Cañas. There are few valleys, prominent among them are the Tonosí and Rico valley. A transitional zone of low hills and clustered mainly in the central southern part of the province hills. A third area in low-lying coastal regions coastal plains and sedimentary basins, where the hilly reliefs that are part of the foothills of the mountains predominate.

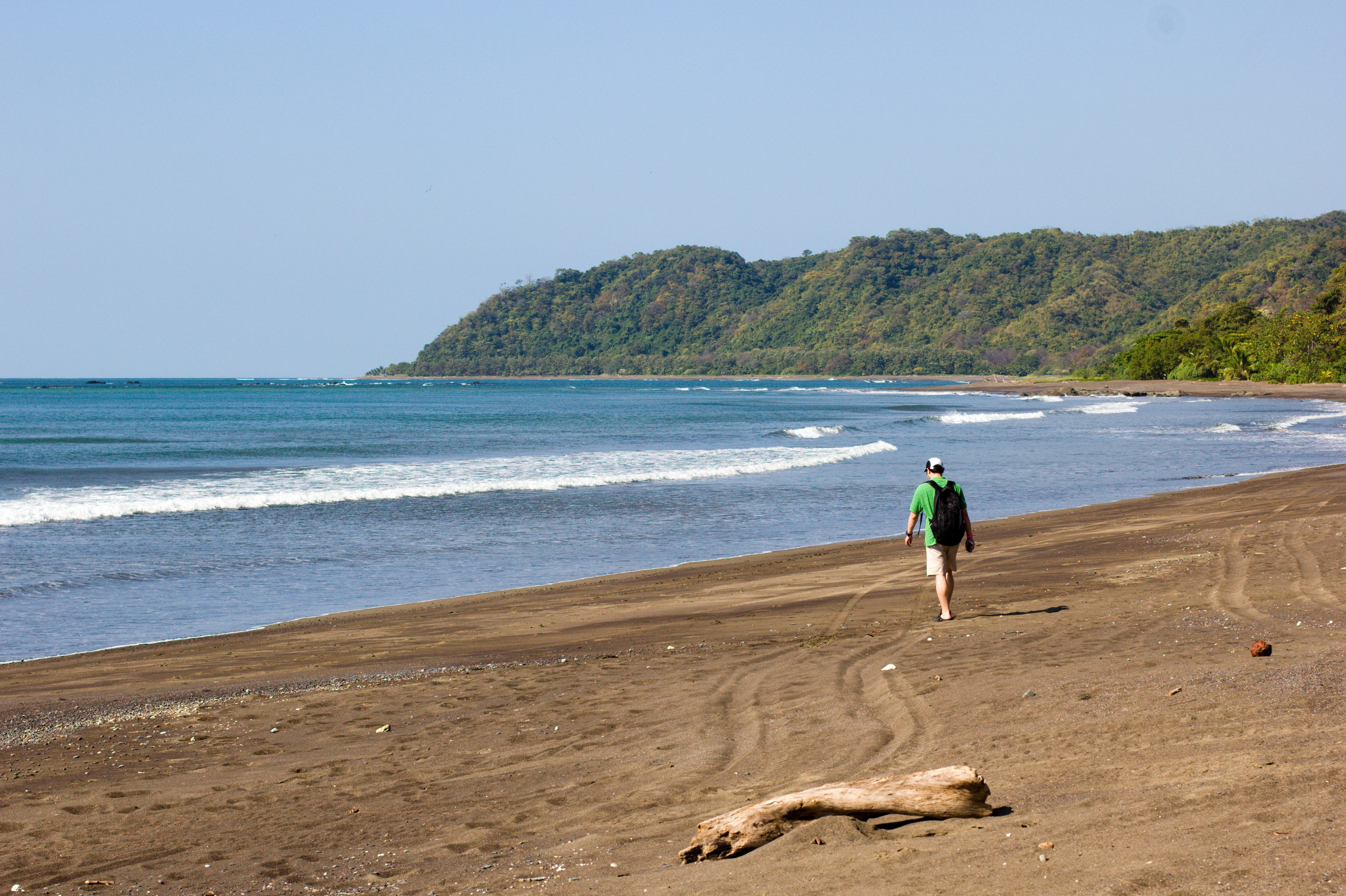
Dark sand beach in Cambutal

The coastline of Los Santos is characterized by an overwhelming predominance of beaches and coastal lowlands with the presence of some cliffs especially in the southern part of the Sierra de Azuero in Tonosí. Mangroves and small dune formations are the most characteristic element of the coastal relief. The beaches are dissipative, fine golden sand on the north and darke volcanic in the south, with annual variations in the coastline that can be labeled due to winter storms.

=== Flora and fauna ===
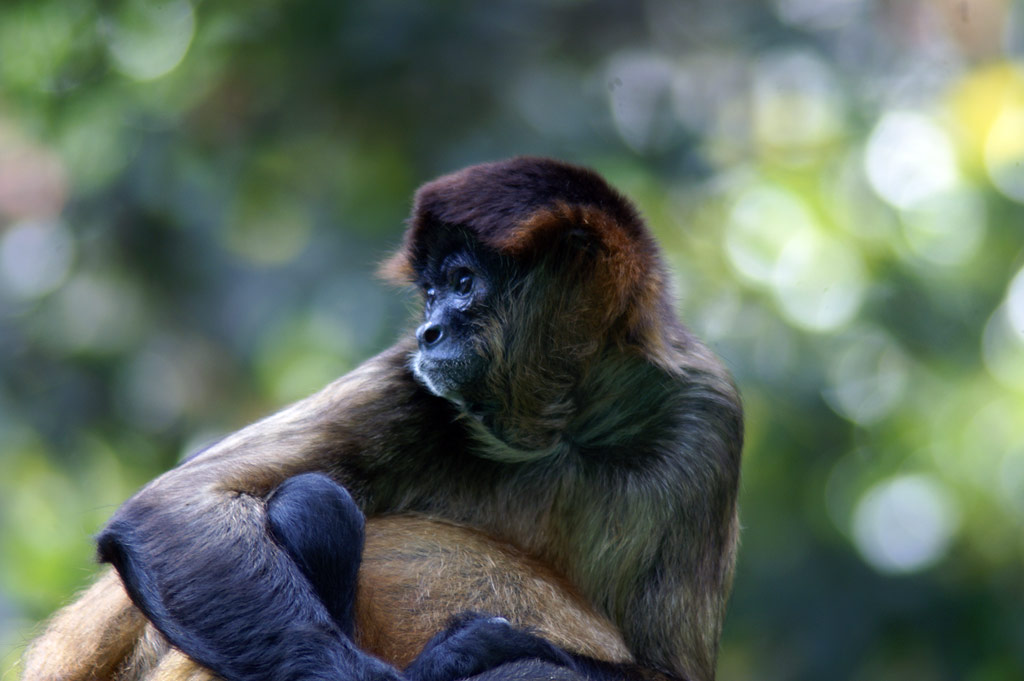
Azuero Spider Monkey

Los Santos’ wildlife is typical of Panama with several distinctions. The province is home to 62 bird species. Because of its long coastline Los Santos hosts a variety of seabirds. The coasts and surrounding islands are home to colonies of egrets, herons and cormorants. It is also, the largest nesting site in Panama for the frigatebird, with a population of more than 5000 in Isla Iguana Wildlife Refuge.

==== Azuero's monkeys ====
Los Santos is home to five of the seven monkeys species living in Panama, some of them critically endangered: Saguinus geoffroyi, Azuero Howler Monkey, Azuero Spider Monkey, Western Capuchin Monkey and Golden-mantled howling monkey.

== National Parks in Los Santos ==
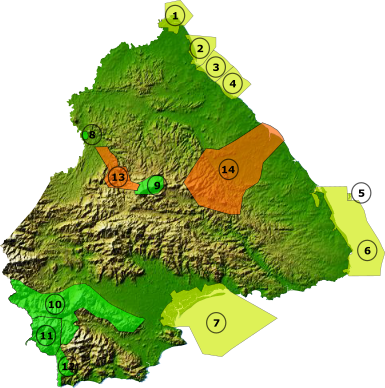
Protected areas in Los Santos province. In green national parks. In yellow coastline and marine protected zones. In brown, two river basins protected areas.

Los Santos has 6 national parks: La Tronosa, Tonosí, Cerro Hoya, Cerro Canajagua, Santa Ana and El Colmón. It has five wildlife refuges. These areas include El Peñón de la Honda, Isla Cañas, Isla Iguana, Pablo Arturo Barrios and La Marinera. The coastline of La Enea and El Espinal corregimiento and the basin of Cacao and Mensabé river are also protected.

== Demographics ==
At the 2010 Panamanian census, Los Santos had 89,592 residents and 29,363 householdsliving within the administrative boundaries. Of those households, 17,352 were married couples living together, 22,679 were co-habiting couples and 10,947 were lone parents or widowers. The unadjusted figures were subsequently altered to take into account under-enumeration, giving an amended mid-year estimate for 2010 of 94,011.

The 2010 census showed that 5,252 residents or 6.6% of the population is illiterate. The ethnicity of Los Santos according to data of the 2010 census was composed mainly by descendants of Spanish and Mestizos, composing 98% of the residents. Minority groups were composed of 1,276 Africans and 656 Indigenous people. The Indigenous population constituted only 0,7% of the population, of whom 36% were Guna, 35% Ngäbe, 17% Buglé and 12% others groups such as Teribe/Naso, Emberá, Bribri and Wounaan.

Religion is not recorded in the census, but the majority is Christian, with Catholic and a significant proportion of Protestant being the most important groups.

== Administrative divisions ==
Los Santos Province is divided into 7 distritos (districts) and sub-divided into 82 corregimientos.

=== Population ===
Distrito	Area (km^{2})	Population Estimate 1990	Population Estimate 2000	Population Estimate 2010	Population Census 2023
Guararé	216	8527	9485	10,890	12,107
Las Tablas	711,2	21,110	24,298	27,146	30,440
Los Santos	385	21,760	23,828	25,723	30,028
Macaracas	618	9,280	9,137	9,021 (Note: Other source says 16,436)	8,965
Pedasí	353	1494	1830	9,404	4,942
Pocrí	289	3,642	3,397	3,259 (Note: Other source says 13,119)	3,025
Tonosí	1.286,5	9,336	9,736	9.787	8,959

View source data.
Population of Panama 2020 by Province View source data.

=== Districts ===
District	Corregimientos (Subdivisions)	Cabecera (Seat)
Guararé District	Guararé, El Espinal, El Macano, Guararé Arriba, La Enea, La Pasera, Las Trancas, Llano Abajo, El Hato, Perales	Guararé
Las Tablas District	Santa Librada de Las Tablas, Bajo Corral, Bayano, El Carate, El Cocal, El Manantial, El Muñoz, El Pedregoso, La Laja, La Miel, La Palma, La Tiza, Las Palmitas, Las Tablas Abajo, Nuario, Palmira, Peña Blanca, Río Hondo, San José, San Miguel, Santo Domingo, El Sesteadero, Valle Rico, Vallerriquito	Santa Librada de Las Tablas
Los Santos District	La Villa de los Santos, El Guásimo, La Colorada, La Espigadilla, Las Cruces, Las Guabas, Los Angeles, Los Olivos, Llano Largo, Sabanagrande, Santa Ana, Tres Quebradas, Villa Lourdes, Agua Buena, El Ejido	La Villa de los Santos
Macaracas District	Macaracas, Bahía Honda, Bajos de Guera, Corozal, Chupa, El Cedro, Espino Amarillo, La Mesa, Llano de Piedra, Las Palmas, Mogollón	Macaracas
Pedasí District	Pedasí, Los Asientos, Mariabé, Purio, Oria Arriba	Pedasí
Pocrí District	Pocrí, El Cañafístulo, Lajamina, Paraíso, Paritilla	Pocrí
Tonosí District	Tonosí, Altos de Guera, Cañas, El Bebedero, El Cacao, El Cortezo, Flores, Guánico, La Tronosa, Cambutal, Isla de Cañas	Tonosí

== History ==
In 1850, the province of Azuero was created in honor of Vicente de Azuero y Plata. In 1855, with the establishment of the "Estado Federal de Panamá", the province was divided into the departments of Los Santos and Herrera. After the union with Colombia, and later with Panama becoming a sovereign state, Los Santos underwent many political and administrative changes. In 1941, with the presidency of Ricardo A. de la Guardia (1941–1945), Los Santos and Herrera were established as one province, named Los Santos. By the Decreto de Gabinete N° 13 of January 8, 1945; Herrera and Los Santos became two different provinces.

== Tourism ==
There are many well-renowned beaches, as found in Venao, Achotines, and Guararé. There are also beaches on the island, Isla Iguana, known for its blue water and white sand. The island is 25 minutes by boat from Pedasí. There are also parks here, such as the national park Cerro Hoya. There are also museums like the: Museum of Nationality (Museo de la Nacionalidad), the Museum Belisario Porras and the Museum Manuel F. Zarate. There is also an arqueological site here called the Sitio Arqueologico Cerro Juan Diaz. There is also the Church of San Antonio and the Church of Santa Librada (made in March 1872). In 1958, a fire burned the Santa Librada's roof.

== Culture ==
Las Tablas is the capital of the province, one of its biggest attractions is the church of Santa Librada, considered a national monument.

The city lives all its splendor during the Carnival celebration that lasts 4 days and 5 nights, being the headquarters city of Las Tablas Best Carnival of the republic, where one of the main attractions of the carnival in Las Tablas, are famous or culecos mojadera, which is sprayed with water (clean and purified) to the participants of this activity from cisternas cars (especially pre-sterilized for this activity) located throughout the park and surrounding streets.

Another well-known celebration is Corpus Christi, a religious holiday which dates its beginnings to the colonial era. It commemorates the institution of the Eucharist in the mix with pagan festivals represented by different dance, which today form part of the folklore of the region, this activity takes place in the City of La Villa de Los Santos.

Los Santos is the place to see the hand-woven Polleras, the typical costume of Panama. Local artisans also make masks of the famous "Diablicos".

== Notable people ==
- Ramiro Mendoza, former Major League Baseball player
- Mireya Moscoso, Panamá’s first female president
