= El Cortezo, Los Santos =

Coordinates: 7.4333°N 80.6333°W

El Cortezo
- Corregimiento
- Location within Panama
- Country: Panama
- Province: Los Santos
- District: Tonosí

Area
  - Land: 150 km^{2} (58 sq mi)

Population (2010)
  - Total: 662
  - Density: 4.4/km^{2} (11/sq mi)
- Population density calculated based on land area.
- Time zone: UTC−5 (EST)

El Cortezo is a corregimiento in Tonosí District, Los Santos Province, Panama with a population of 662 as of 2010. Its population as of 1990 was 760; its population as of 2000 was 734.
