= Santo Domingo, Los Santos =

Coordinates: 7.7500°N 80.2500°W

Santo Domingo
- Corregimiento
- Location within Panama
- Country: Panama
- Province: Los Santos
- District: Las Tablas

Area
  - Land: 48.5 km^{2} (18.7 sq mi)

Population (2010)
  - Total: 2,050
  - Density: 42.2/km^{2} (109/sq mi)
- Population density calculated based on land area.
- Time zone: UTC−5 (EST)

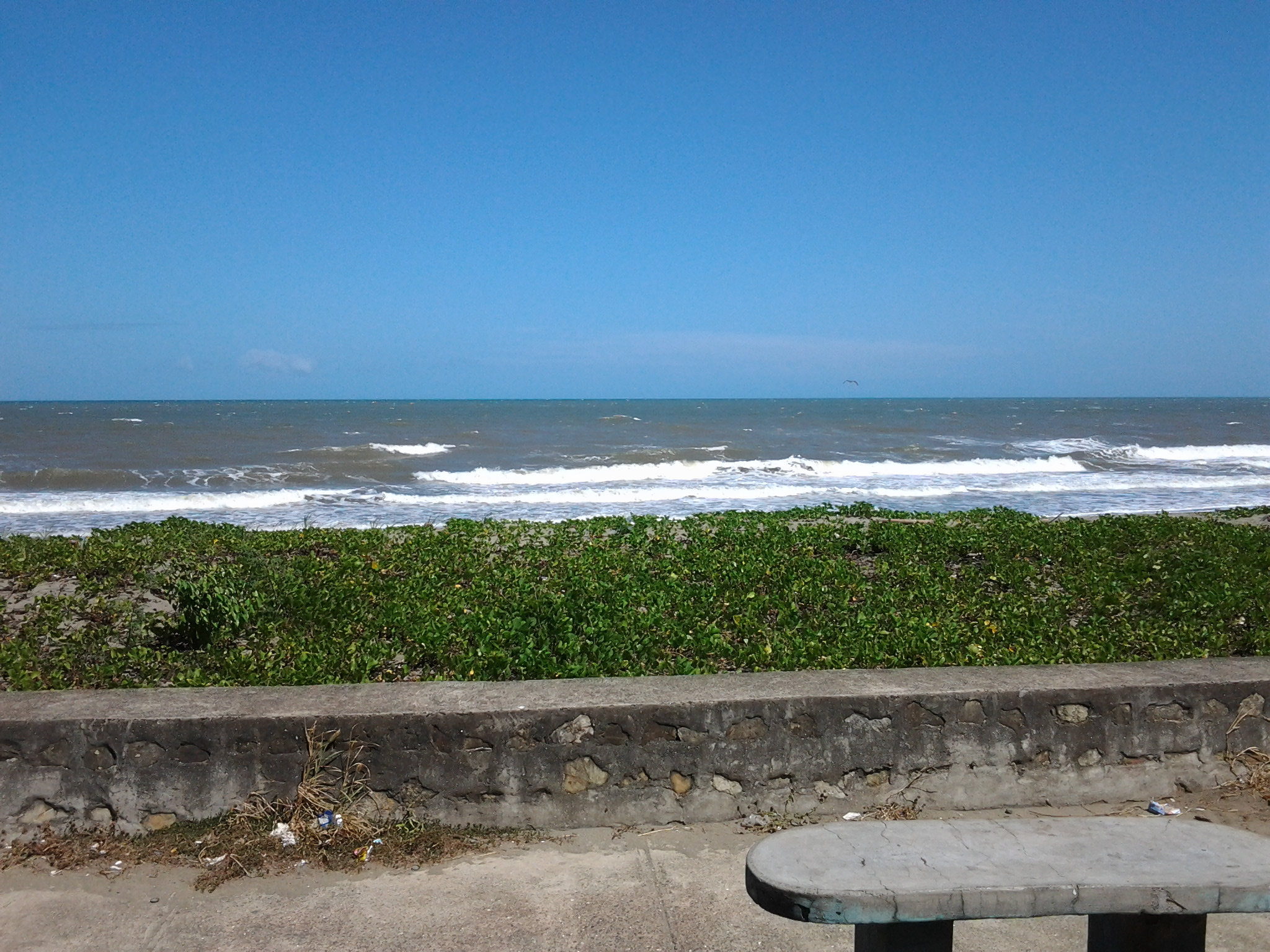

Santo Domingo is a corregimiento in Las Tablas District, Los Santos Province, Panama with a population of 2,050 as of 2010. Its population as of 1990 was 1,538; its population as of 2000 was 1,840.
