= La Mesa, Los Santos =

Coordinates: 7.6622°N 80.6175°W

La Mesa
- Corregimiento
- Location within Panama
- Country: Panama
- Province: Los Santos
- District: Macaracas

Area
  - Land: 46.2 km^{2} (17.8 sq mi)

Population (2010)
  - Total: 641
  - Density: 13.9/km^{2} (36/sq mi)
- Population density calculated based on land area.
- Time zone: UTC−5 (EST)

La Mesa is a corregimiento in Macaracas District, Los Santos Province, Panama with a population of 641 as of 2010. Its population as of 1990 was 675; its population as of 2000 was 637.
