= El Macano =

- Corregimiento
- Location within Panama
- Coordinates: 7.8276°N 80.5583°W
- Country: Panama
- Province: Los Santos
- District: Guararé

Area
  - Land: 29 km^{2} (11 sq mi)

Population (2010)
  - Total: 281
  - Density: 9.7/km^{2} (25/sq mi)
- Population density calculated based on land area.
- Time zone: UTC−5 (EST)

El Macano is a corregimiento in Guararé District, Los Santos Province, Panama with a population of 281 as of 2010. Its population as of 1990 was 339; its population as of 2000 was 242.
