= Las Palmitas, Los Santos =

Las Palmitas
- Corregimiento
- Location within Panama
- Coordinates: 7.7667°N 80.3000°W
- Country: Panama
- Province: Los Santos
- District: Las Tablas

Area
  - Land: 11.1 km^{2} (4.3 sq mi)

Population (2010)
  - Total: 2,057
  - Density: 185.7/km^{2} (481/sq mi)
- Population density calculated based on land area.
- Time zone: UTC−5 (EST)

Las Palmitas is a corregimiento in Las Tablas District, Los Santos Province, Panama with a population of 2,057 as of 2010. Its population as of 1990 was 1,046; its population as of 2000 was 1,404.
