= Guariviara =

- Corregimiento
- Interactive map of Guariviara
- Coordinates: 8°46′40″N 81°57′15″W
- Country: Panama
- Comarca Indígena: Ngäbe-Buglé Comarca
- District: Kankintú
- Time zone: UTC−5 (EST)

Guariviara is a corregimiento in Ngäbe-Buglé Comarca in the Republic of Panama.
