= El Cacao, Los Santos =

Coordinates: 7.5000°N 80.5500°W

El Cacao
- Corregimiento
- Location within Panama
- Country: Panama
- Province: Los Santos
- District: Tonosí

Area
  - Land: 92.3 km^{2} (35.6 sq mi)

Population (2010)
  - Total: 1,049
  - Density: 11.4/km^{2} (30/sq mi)
- Population density calculated based on land area.
- Time zone: UTC−5 (EST)

El Cacao is a corregimiento in Tonosí District, Los Santos Province, Panama with a population of 1,049 as of 2010. Its population as of 1990 was 778; its population as of 2000 was 932.
