= La Miel =

- Corregimiento
- Location within Panama
- Coordinates: 7.5500°N 80.3333°W
- Country: Panama
- Province: Los Santos
- District: Las Tablas

Area
  - Land: 34.2 km^{2} (13.2 sq mi)

Population (2010)
  - Total: 290
  - Density: 8.5/km^{2} (22/sq mi)
- Population density calculated based on land area.
- Time zone: UTC−5 (EST)

La Miel is a corregimiento in Las Tablas District, Los Santos Province, Panama with a population of 290 as of 2010. Its population as of 1990 was 318; its population as of 2000 was 312.
