= San José, Los Santos =

San José
- Corregimiento
- Location within Panama
- Coordinates: 7.6667°N 80.2500°W
- Country: Panama
- Province: Los Santos
- District: Las Tablas

Area
  - Land: 61.6 km^{2} (23.8 sq mi)

Population (2010)
  - Total: 593
  - Density: 9.6/km^{2} (25/sq mi)
- Population density calculated based on land area.
- Time zone: UTC−5 (EST)

San José is a corregimiento in Las Tablas District, Los Santos Province, Panama with a population of 593 as of 2010. Its population as of 1990 was 593; its population as of 2000 was 640.
