= El Hato =

- Corregimiento
- Location within Panama
- Coordinates: 7.7833°N 80.5500°W
- Country: Panama
- Province: Los Santos
- District: Guararé
- Established: July 29, 1998

Area
  - Land: 24 km^{2} (9.3 sq mi)

Population (2010)
  - Total: 374
  - Density: 15.6/km^{2} (40/sq mi)
- Population density calculated based on land area.
- Time zone: UTC−5 (EST)

El Hato is a corregimiento in Guararé District, Los Santos Province, Panama with a population of 374 as of 2010. It was created by Law 58 of July 29, 1998, owing to the Declaration of Unconstitutionality of Law 1 of 1982. Its population as of 2000 was 416.
