= Paritilla =

- Corregimiento
- Location within Panama
- Coordinates: 7.6333°N 80.1667°W
- Country: Panama
- Province: Los Santos
- District: Pocrí

Area
  - Land: 48.2 km^{2} (18.6 sq mi)

Population (2010)
  - Total: 783
  - Density: 16.3/km^{2} (42/sq mi)
- Population density calculated based on land area.
- Time zone: UTC−5 (EST)

Paritilla is a corregimiento in Pocrí District, Los Santos Province, Panama with a population of 783 as of 2010. Its population as of 1990 was 977; its population as of 2000 was 840.
