= Mogollón, Los Santos =

Coordinates: 7.6500°N 80.4667°W

Mogollón
- Corregimiento
- Location within Panama
- Country: Panama
- Province: Los Santos
- District: Macaracas

Area
  - Land: 55.2 km^{2} (21.3 sq mi)

Population (2010)
  - Total: 264
  - Density: 4.8/km^{2} (12/sq mi)
- Population density calculated based on land area.
- Time zone: UTC−5 (EST)

Mogollón is a corregimiento in Macaracas District, Los Santos Province, Panama with a population of 264 as of 2010. Its population as of 1990 was 359; its population as of 2000 was 293.
