= El Muñoz =

- Corregimiento
- Location within Panama
- Coordinates: 7.6667°N 80.3167°W
- Country: Panama
- Province: Los Santos
- District: Las Tablas

Area
  - Land: 33.1 km^{2} (12.8 sq mi)

Population (2010)
  - Total: 376
  - Density: 11.4/km^{2} (30/sq mi)
- Population density calculated based on land area.
- Time zone: UTC−5 (EST)

El Muñoz is a corregimiento in Las Tablas District, Los Santos Province, Panama with a population of 376 as of 2010. Its population as of 1990 was 319; its population as of 2000 was 328.
