= Tres Quebradas, Los Santos =

Coordinates: 7.8500°N 80.4167°W

Tres Quebradas
- Corregimiento
- Location within Panama
- Country: Panama
- Province: Los Santos
- District: Los Santos

Area
  - Land: 12.8 km^{2} (4.9 sq mi)

Population (2010)
  - Total: 717
  - Density: 55.8/km^{2} (145/sq mi)
- Population density calculated based on land area.
- Time zone: UTC−5 (EST)

Tres Quebradas is a corregimiento in Los Santos district, Los Santos province, Panama, with a population of 717 in 2010. Its population in 2000 was 665 and in 1990 was 1,646.
