= Llano Abajo =

- Corregimiento
- Location within Panama
- Coordinates: 7.7833°N 80.4167°W
- Country: Panama
- Province: Los Santos
- District: Guararé

Area
  - Land: 21.3 km^{2} (8.2 sq mi)

Population (2010)
  - Total: 550
  - Density: 25.9/km^{2} (67/sq mi)
- Population density calculated based on land area.
- Time zone: UTC−5 (EST)

Llano Abajo is a corregimiento in Guararé District, Los Santos Province, Panama with a population of 550 as of 2010. Its population as of 1990 was 898; its population as of 2000 was 511.
