= Bayano, Los Santos =

Bayano
- Corregimiento
- Location within Panama
- Coordinates: 7.9500°N 80.3167°W
- Country: Panama
- Province: Los Santos
- District: Las Tablas

Area
  - Land: 112.8 km^{2} (43.6 sq mi)

Population (2010)
  - Total: 660
  - Density: 5.9/km^{2} (15/sq mi)
- Population density calculated based on land area.
- Time zone: UTC−5 (EST)

Bayano is a corregimiento in Las Tablas District, Los Santos Province, Panama with a population of 660 as of 2010. Its population as of 1990 was 800; its population as of 2000 was 762.
