= Calovébora o Santa Catalina =

- Corregimiento
- Country: Panama
- Comarca Indígena: Ngäbe-Buglé Comarca
- District: Kusapín
- Time zone: UTC−5 (EST)

Calovébora o Santa Catalina is a corregimiento in Ngäbe-Buglé Comarca in the Republic of Panama.
