= La Tiza =

- Town and corregimiento
- Location within Panama
- Coordinates: 7°45′0″N 80°16′48″W
- Country: Panama
- Province: Los Santos
- District: Las Tablas

Area
  - Land: 3.8 km^{2} (1.5 sq mi)

Population (2010)
  - Total: 1,702
  - Density: 442.9/km^{2} (1,147/sq mi)
- Population density calculated based on land area.
- Time zone: UTC−5 (EST)
- Area code: 507

La Tiza is a town and corregimiento in Las Tablas District, Los Santos Province, Panama with a population of 1,702 as of 2010. Its population as of 1990 was 1,167; its population as of 2000 was 1,662.

== Climate ==
The average temperature is 25 °C. The warmest month is March, at 28 °C, and the coolest is October, at 22 °C. The average rainfall is 2,084 mm per year. The wettest month is June, at 363 mm of rain, and the driest is March, at 1 mm.
