= Altos de Güera =

Coordinates: 7.5333°N 80.6333°W

- Corregimiento
- Location within Panama
- Country: Panama
- Province: Los Santos
- District: Tonosí

Area
  - Land: 141.8 km^{2} (54.7 sq mi)

Population (2010)
  - Total: 632
  - Density: 4.5/km^{2} (12/sq mi)
- Population density calculated based on land area.
- Time zone: UTC−5 (EST)

Altos de Güera is a corregimiento in Tonosí District, Los Santos Province, Panama with a population of 632 as of 2010. Its population as of 1990 was 814; its population as of 2000 was 751.
