= Las Guabas =

Coordinates: 7.8167°N 80.4833°W

- Corregimiento
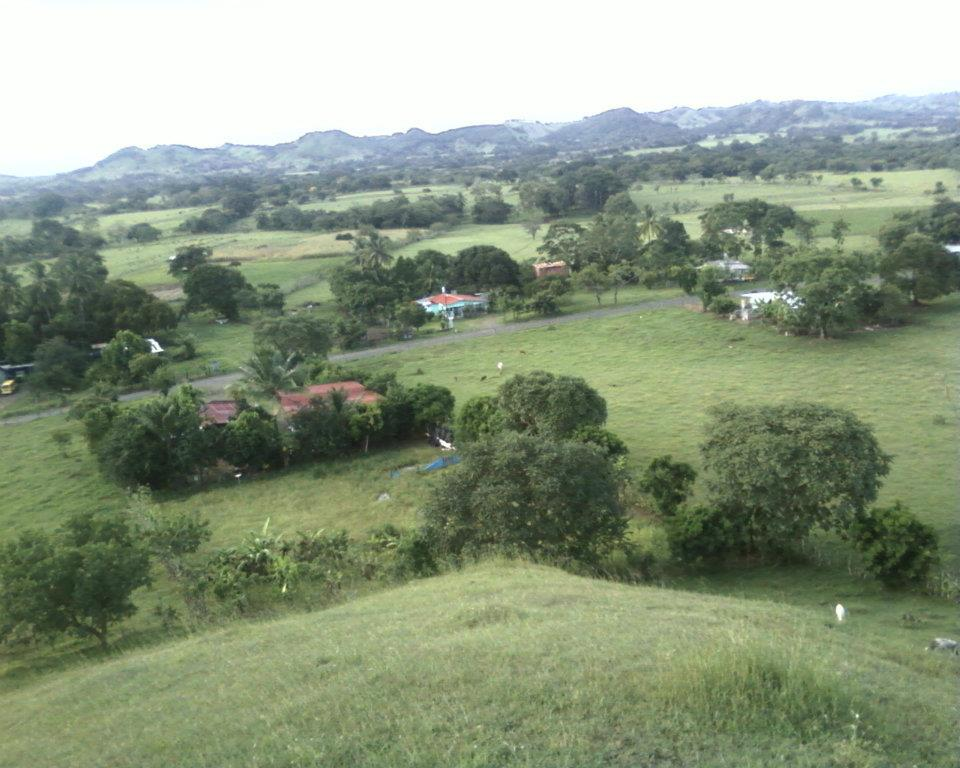
- Las guabas de los santos

- Location within Panama
- Country: Panama
- Province: Los Santos
- District: Los Santos

Area
  - Land: 21.9 km^{2} (8.5 sq mi)

Population (2010)
  - Total: 677
  - Density: 30.9/km^{2} (80/sq mi)
- Population density calculated based on land area.
- Time zone: UTC−5 (EST)

Las Guabas is a corregimiento in Los Santos District, Los Santos Province, Panama with a population of 677 as of 2010. Its population as of 1990 was 1,539; its population as of 2000 was 693.
