= Santiago (corregimiento) =

- Corregimiento
- Country: Panama
- Province: Veraguas
- District: Santiago

Area
  - Land: 44.2 km^{2} (17.1 sq mi)

Population (2010)
  - Total: 31,065
  - Density: 702.6/km^{2} (1,820/sq mi)
- Population density calculated based on land area.
- Time zone: UTC−5 (EST)

Santiago is a corregimiento in Santiago District, Veraguas Province, Panama with a population of 31,065 as of 2010. It is the seat of Santiago District. Its population as of 1990 was 43,874; its population as of 2000 was 32,480.
