= Bajos de Güera =

Coordinates: 7.5500°N 80.6167°W

- Corregimiento
- Location within Panama
- Country: Panama
- Province: Los Santos
- District: Macaracas

Area
  - Land: 99.5 km^{2} (38.4 sq mi)

Population (2010)
  - Total: 619
  - Density: 6.2/km^{2} (16/sq mi)
- Population density calculated based on land area.
- Time zone: UTC−5 (EST)

Bajos de Güera is a corregimiento in Macaracas District, Los Santos Province, Panama with a population of 619 as of 2010. Its population as of 1990 was 897; its population as of 2000 was 738.
