= Río Hondo, Los Santos =

Río Hondo
- Corregimiento
- Location within Panama
- Coordinates: 7.7167°N 80.3382°W
- Country: Panama
- Province: Los Santos
- District: Las Tablas

Area
  - Land: 32.2 km^{2} (12.4 sq mi)

Population (2010)
  - Total: 206
  - Density: 6.4/km^{2} (17/sq mi)
- Population density calculated based on land area.
- Time zone: UTC−5 (EST)

Río Hondo is a corregimiento in Las Tablas District, Los Santos Province, Panama with a population of 206 as of 2010. Its population as of 1990 was 299; its population as of 2000 was 254.
