= El Cedro, Los Santos =

Coordinates: 7.7833°N 80.5333°W

El Cedro
- Corregimiento
- Location within Panama
- Country: Panama
- Province: Los Santos
- District: Macaracas

Area
  - Land: 28.1 km^{2} (10.8 sq mi)

Population (2010)
  - Total: 450
  - Density: 16/km^{2} (41/sq mi)
- Population density calculated based on land area.
- Time zone: UTC−5 (EST)

El Cedro is a corregimiento in Macaracas District, Los Santos Province, Panama with a population of 450 as of 2010. Its population as of 1990 was 461; its population as of 2000 was 489.
