= Tuwai =

- Corregimiento
- Interactive map of Tuwai
- Location within Panama
- Coordinates: 9°01′N 82°20′W
- Country: Panama
- Comarca Indígena: Ngäbe-Buglé Comarca
- District: Kankintú
- Time zone: UTC−5 (EST)

Tuwai is a corregimiento in Ngäbe-Buglé Comarca in the Republic of Panama.
