= Los Asientos =

- Corregimiento
- Location within Panama
- Coordinates: 7.5167°N 80.1333°W
- Country: Panama
- Province: Los Santos
- District: Pedasí

Area
  - Land: 90.7 km^{2} (35.0 sq mi)

Population (2010)
  - Total: 755
  - Density: 8.3/km^{2} (21/sq mi)
- Population density calculated based on land area.
- Time zone: UTC−5 (EST)

Los Asientos is a corregimiento in Pedasí District, Los Santos Province, Panama with a population of 755 as of 2010. Its population as of 1990 was 1,007; its population as of 2000 was 687.
