= Las Tablas Abajo =

- Corregimiento
- Location within Panama
- Coordinates: 7.7833°N 80.2667°W
- Country: Panama
- Province: Los Santos
- District: Las Tablas

Area
  - Land: 15.7 km^{2} (6.1 sq mi)

Population (2010)
  - Total: 1,030
  - Density: 65.7/km^{2} (170/sq mi)
- Population density calculated based on land area.
- Time zone: UTC−5 (EST)

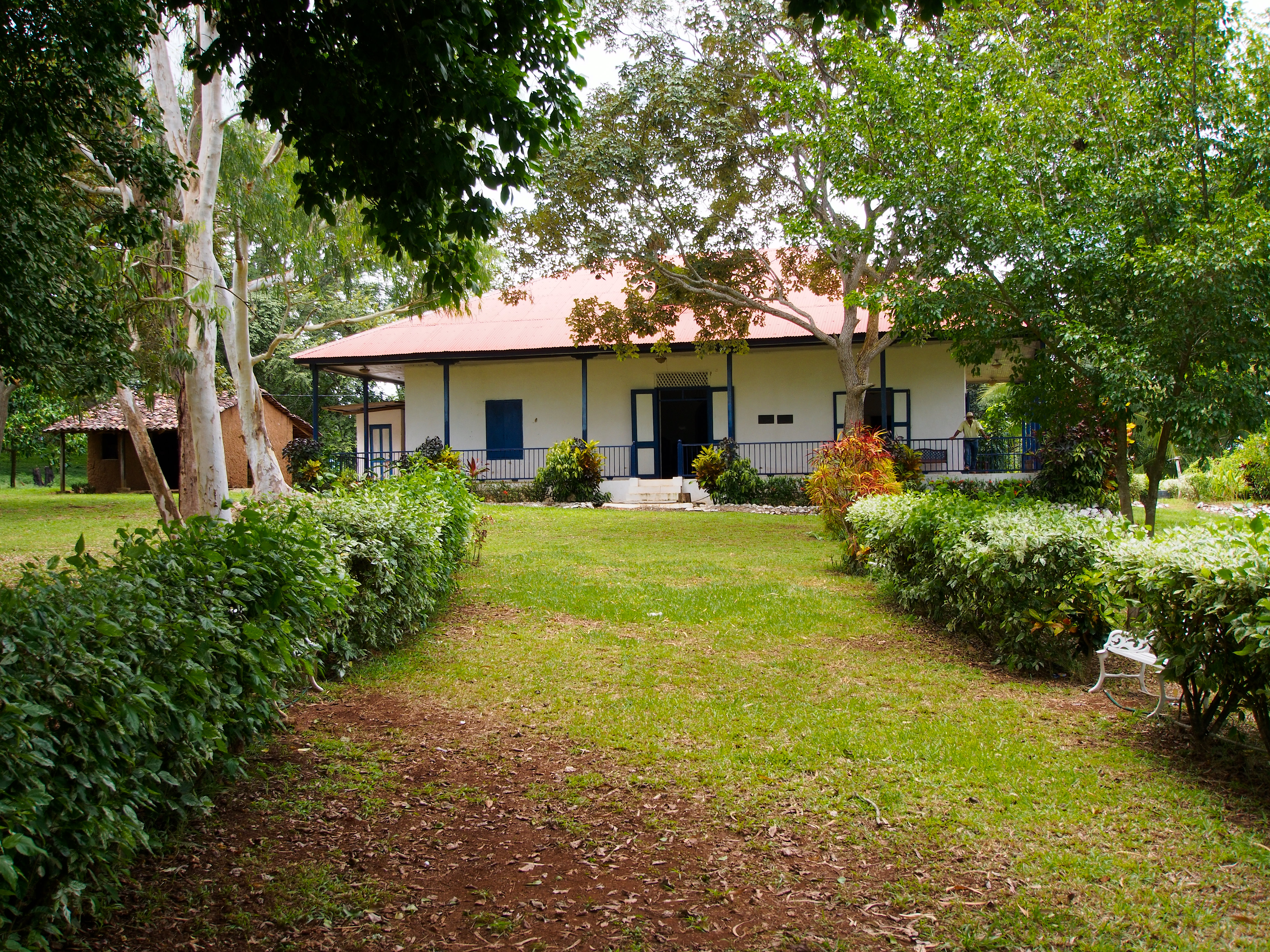
El Pausilipo, a cultural heritage monument in Las Tablas Abajo.

Las Tablas Abajo is a corregimiento in Las Tablas District, Los Santos Province, Panama with a population of 1,030 as of 2010. Its population as of 1990 was 414; its population as of 2000 was 581.
