= Las Palmas, Los Santos =

Coordinates: 7.6833°N 80.5000°W

Las Palmas
- Corregimiento
- Location within Panama
- Country: Panama
- Province: Los Santos
- District: Macaracas

Area
  - Land: 42.4 km^{2} (16.4 sq mi)

Population (2010)
  - Total: 436
  - Density: 10.3/km^{2} (27/sq mi)
- Population density calculated based on land area.
- Time zone: UTC−5 (EST)

Las Palmas is a corregimiento in Macaracas District, Los Santos Province, Panama with a population of 436 as of 2010. Its population as of 1990 was 579; its population as of 2000 was 473.
