= Perales, Los Santos =

Perales
- Corregimiento
- Location within Panama
- Coordinates: 7.7833°N 80.3333°W
- Country: Panama
- Province: Los Santos
- District: Guararé
- Established: July 29, 1998

Area
  - Land: 17.9 km^{2} (6.9 sq mi)

Population (2010)
  - Total: 421
  - Density: 23.6/km^{2} (61/sq mi)
- Population density calculated based on land area.
- Time zone: UTC−5 (EST)

Perales is a corregimiento in Guararé District, Los Santos Province, Panama with a population of 421 as of 2010. It was created by Law 58 of July 29, 1998, owing to the Declaration of Unconstitutionality of Law 1 of 1982. Its population as of 2000 was 416.
