= Bajo Corral =

- Corregimiento
- Location within Panama
- Coordinates: 7.6000°N 80.2667°W
- Country: Panama
- Province: Los Santos
- District: Las Tablas

Area
  - Land: 63.1 km^{2} (24.4 sq mi)

Population (2010)
  - Total: 483
  - Density: 7.7/km^{2} (20/sq mi)
- Population density calculated based on land area.
- Time zone: UTC−5 (EST)

Bajo Corral is a corregimiento in Las Tablas District, Los Santos Province, Panama with a population of 483 as of 2010. Its population as of 1990 was 601; its population as of 2000 was 546.
