= El Bebedero =

Coordinates: 7.4167°N 80.4667°W

- Corregimiento
- Location within Panama
- Country: Panama
- Province: Los Santos
- District: Tonosí

Area
  - Land: 116.6 km^{2} (45.0 sq mi)

Population (2010)
  - Total: 1,332
  - Density: 11.4/km^{2} (30/sq mi)
- Population density calculated based on land area.
- Time zone: UTC−5 (EST)

El Bebedero is a corregimiento in Tonosí District, Los Santos Province, Panama with a population of 1,332 as of 2010. Its population as of 1990 was 1,227; its population as of 2000 was 1,389.
