= Loma Yuca =

Coordinates: 8°43′N 81°24′W

- Corregimiento
- Interactive map of Loma Yuca
- Country: Panama
- Comarca Indígena: Ngäbe-Buglé Comarca
- District: Kusapín
- Time zone: UTC−5 (EST)

Loma Yuca is a corregimiento in Ngäbe-Buglé Comarca in the Republic of Panama.
