= Llano de Piedra =

- Town and corregimiento
- Location within Panama
- Coordinates: 7°40′12″N 80°34′12″W
- Country: Panama
- Province: Los Santos
- District: Macaracas

Area
  - Land: 99.9 km^{2} (38.6 sq mi)

Population (2010)
  - Total: 1,737
  - Density: 17.4/km^{2} (45/sq mi)
- Population density calculated based on land area.
- Time zone: UTC−5 (EST)

Llano de Piedra is a town and corregimiento in Macaracas District, Los Santos Province, Panama with a population of 1,737 as of 2010. Its population as of 1990 was 1,756; its population as of 2000 was 1,843.
