= El Cañafístulo =

- Corregimiento
- Location within Panama
- Coordinates: 7.5732°N 80.2240°W
- Country: Panama
- Province: Los Santos
- District: Pocrí

Area
  - Land: 58.4 km^{2} (22.5 sq mi)

Population (2010)
  - Total: 363
  - Density: 6.2/km^{2} (16/sq mi)
- Population density calculated based on land area.
- Time zone: UTC−5 (EST)

El Cañafístulo is a corregimiento in Pocrí District, Los Santos Province, Panama with a population of 363 as of 2010. Its population as of 1990 was 500; its population as of 2000 was 460.
