= Paraíso, Los Santos =

Paraíso
- Corregimiento
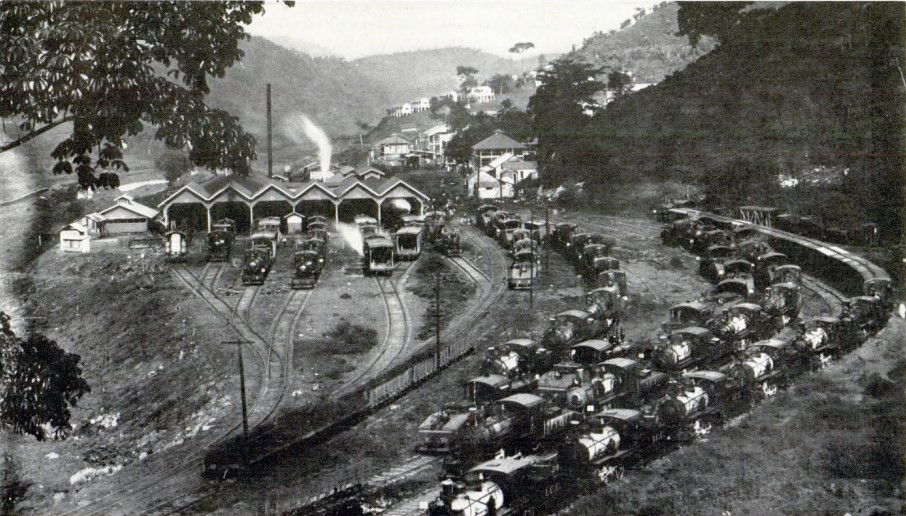
- Railway shops, Paraiso, Panama, ca 1920

- Location within Panama
- Coordinates: 7.6833°N 80.1667°W
- Country: Panama
- Province: Los Santos
- District: Pocrí

Area
  - Land: 64.4 km^{2} (24.9 sq mi)

Population (2010)
  - Total: 597
  - Density: 9.3/km^{2} (24/sq mi)
- Population density calculated based on land area.
- Time zone: UTC−5 (EST)

Paraíso is a corregimiento in Pocrí District, Los Santos Province, Panama with a population of 597 as of 2010. Its population as of 1990 was 574; its population as of 2000 was 593.
