= Chupá =

Coordinates: 7.8000°N 80.5833°W

- Corregimiento
- Location within Panama
- Country: Panama
- Province: Los Santos
- District: Macaracas

Area
  - Land: 17.9 km^{2} (6.9 sq mi)

Population (2010)
  - Total: 520
  - Density: 29.1/km^{2} (75/sq mi)
- Population density calculated based on land area.
- Time zone: UTC−5 (EST)

Chupá is a corregimiento in Macaracas District, Los Santos Province, Panama with a population of 520 as of 2010. Its population as of 1990 was 637; its population as of 2000 was 564.
