= Cambutal =

Coordinates: 7.2667°N 80.4833°W

- Corregimiento
- Location within Panama
- Country: Panama
- Province: Los Santos
- District: Tonosí
- Established: July 29, 1998

Area
  - Land: 183 km^{2} (71 sq mi)

Population (2010)
  - Total: 511
  - Density: 2.8/km^{2} (7.3/sq mi)
- Population density calculated based on land area.
- Time zone: UTC−5 (EST)

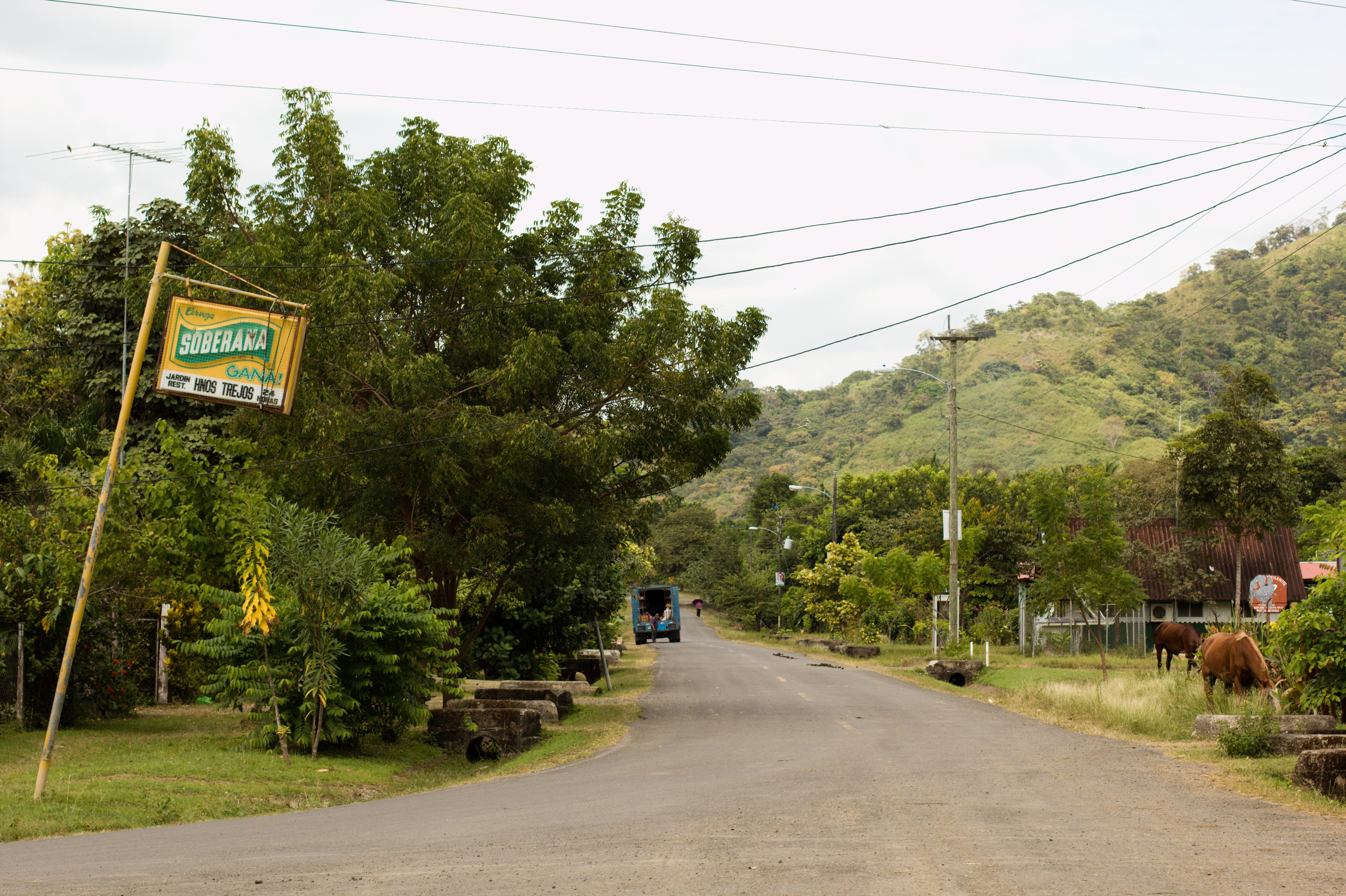

Cambutal is a corregimiento in Tonosí District, Los Santos Province, Panama with a population of 511 as of 2010. It was created by Law 58 of July 29, 1998, owing to the Declaration of Unconstitutionality of Law 1 of 1982. Its population as of 2000 was 452.

The annual fishing tournament is one of the largest in Panama.
