= La Enea =

- Corregimiento
- Location within Panama
- Coordinates: 7.8385°N 80.2721°W
- Country: Panama
- Province: Los Santos
- District: Guararé

Area
  - Land: 13.2 km^{2} (5.1 sq mi)

Population (2010)
  - Total: 1,186
  - Density: 90.1/km^{2} (233/sq mi)
- Population density calculated based on land area.
- Time zone: UTC−5 (EST)

La Enea is a corregimiento in Guararé District, Los Santos Province, Panama with a population of 1,186 as of 2010. Its population as of 1990 was 871; its population as of 2000 was 1,128.
