= Oria Arriba =

- Corregimiento
- Location within Panama
- Coordinates: 7.6000°N 80.4333°W
- Country: Panama
- Province: Los Santos
- District: Pedasí
- Established: July 29, 1998

Area
  - Land: 103.2 km^{2} (39.8 sq mi)

Population (2010)
  - Total: 297
  - Density: 2.9/km^{2} (7.5/sq mi)
- Population density calculated based on land area.
- Time zone: UTC−5 (EST)

Oria Arriba is a corregimiento in Pedasí District, Los Santos Province, Panama with a population of 297 as of 2010. It was created by Law 58 of July 29, 1998, owing to the Declaration of Unconstitutionality of Law 1 of 1982. Its population as of 2000 was 281.
