= La Laja =

- Corregimiento
- Location within Panama
- Coordinates: 7.7333°N 80.2500°W
- Country: Panama
- Province: Los Santos
- District: Las Tablas

Area
  - Land: 4.4 km^{2} (1.7 sq mi)

Population (2010)
  - Total: 547
  - Density: 124.7/km^{2} (323/sq mi)
- Population density calculated based on land area.
- Time zone: UTC−5 (EST)

La Laja is a corregimiento in Las Tablas District, Los Santos Province, Panama with a population of 547 as of 2010. Its population as of 1990 was 553; its population as of 2000 was 583.
