= Palmira, Los Santos =

Palmira
- Corregimiento
- Location within Panama
- Coordinates: 7.6778°N 80.3500°W
- Country: Panama
- Province: Los Santos
- District: Las Tablas

Area
  - Land: 9.7 km^{2} (3.7 sq mi)

Population (2010)
  - Total: 93
  - Density: 9.6/km^{2} (25/sq mi)
- Population density calculated based on land area.
- Time zone: UTC−5 (EST)

Palmira is a corregimiento in Las Tablas District, Los Santos Province, Panama.

== Demographics ==
Its population as of 2010 was 93. Its population in 1990 was 89 and in 2000 it was 71.
