= El Guásimo, Los Santos =

Coordinates: 7.8193°N 80.5330°W

El Guásimo
- Corregimiento
- Location within Panama
- Country: Panama
- Province: Los Santos
- District: Los Santos

Area
  - Land: 30.8 km^{2} (11.9 sq mi)

Population (2010)
  - Total: 610
  - Density: 19.8/km^{2} (51/sq mi)
- Population density calculated based on land area.
- Time zone: UTC−5 (EST)

El Guásimo is a corregimiento in Los Santos District, Los Santos Province, Panama with a population of 610 as of 2010. Its population as of 1990 was 645; its population as of 2000 was 555.
