= Llano Largo =

- Corregimiento
- Location within Panama
- Coordinates: 7°54′0″N 80°25′48″W
- Country: Panama
- Province: Los Santos
- District: Los Santos

Area
  - Land: 10.4 km^{2} (4.0 sq mi)

Population (2010)
  - Total: 2,265
  - Density: 218.5/km^{2} (566/sq mi)
- Population density calculated based on land area.
- Time zone: UTC−5 (EST)

Llano Largo is a corregimiento in Los Santos District, Los Santos Province, Panama with a population of 2,265 as of 2010. Its population as of 1990 was 1,715; its population as of 2000 was 2,003.
