= Bakama =

- Corregimiento
- Interactive map of Bakama
- Coordinates: 8.26212°N 81.61929°W
- Country: Panama
- Comarca Indígena: Ngäbe-Buglé Comarca
- District: Müna
- Time zone: UTC−5 (EST)

Bakama is a corregimiento in Ngäbe-Buglé Comarca in the Republic of Panama.
