= Flores, Los Santos =

Coordinates: 7.4833°N 80.4000°W

Flores
- Corregimiento
- Location within Panama
- Country: Panama
- Province: Los Santos
- District: Tonosí

Area
  - Land: 105 km^{2} (41 sq mi)

Population (2010)
  - Total: 664
  - Density: 6.3/km^{2} (16/sq mi)
- Population density calculated based on land area.
- Time zone: UTC−5 (EST)

Flores is a corregimiento in Tonosí District, Los Santos Province, Panama with a population of 664 as of 2010. Its population as of 1990 was 634; its population as of 2000 was 528.
