= Cañas, Los Santos =

Coordinates: 7.4500°N 80.2667°W

Cañas
- Corregimiento
- Location within Panama
- Country: Panama
- Province: Los Santos
- District: Tonosí

Area
  - Land: 94.1 km^{2} (36.3 sq mi)

Population (2010)
  - Total: 650
  - Density: 6.9/km^{2} (18/sq mi)
- Population density calculated based on land area.
- Time zone: UTC−5 (EST)

Cañas is a corregimiento in Tonosí District, Los Santos Province, Panama with a population of 650 as of 2010. Its population as of 1990 was 1,015; its population as of 2000 was 994.
