= El Espinal, Los Santos =

El Espinal
- Corregimiento
- Location within Panama
- Coordinates: 7.8692°N 80.3189°W
- Country: Panama
- Province: Los Santos
- District: Guararé

Area
  - Land: 35.4 km^{2} (13.7 sq mi)

Population (2010)
  - Total: 1,243
  - Density: 35.1/km^{2} (91/sq mi)
- Population density calculated based on land area.
- Time zone: UTC−5 (EST)

El Espinal is a corregimiento in Guararé District, Los Santos Province, Panama with a population of 1,243 as of 2010. Its population as of 1990 was 1,117; its population as of 2000 was 1,206.
