= Lajamina =

- Corregimiento
- Location within Panama
- Coordinates: 7.5833°N 80.1333°W
- Country: Panama
- Province: Los Santos
- District: Pocrí

Area
  - Land: 51.7 km^{2} (20.0 sq mi)

Population (2010)
  - Total: 514
  - Density: 9.9/km^{2} (26/sq mi)
- Population density calculated based on land area.
- Time zone: UTC−5 (EST)

Lajamina is a corregimiento in Pocrí District, Los Santos Province, Panama with a population of 514 as of 2010. Its population as of 1990 was 685; its population as of 2000 was 627.
