= Corregimientos of Panama =

Administrative territorial entity of Panama

In Panama, a corregimiento is a subdivision of a district, which in turn is a subdivision of a province. It is the smallest administrative division level in the country; which is further subdivided into populated places/centres. As of 2012, Panama is subdivided into a total of 693 corregimientos, since several of these were created in the province of Bocas del Toro and the indigenous region (comarca indígena) of Ngäbe-Buglé.

== List of corregimientos by province and district ==
=== Province of Bocas del Toro ===
Districts of Bocas del Toro.

District	Corregimientos	District seat
Almirante	Puerto Almirante; Barriada Guaymí; Barrio Francés; Nance de Risco; Valle del Risco; Valle de Aguas Arriba	Puerto Almirante
Bocas del Toro	Bastimentos; Bocas del Toro; Cauchero; Punta Laurel; Tierra Oscura	Bocas del Toro
Changuinola	Barriada 4 de Abril; Changuinola; Cochigro; El Empalme; El Silencio; Finca 6; Finca 30; Finca 60; Guabito; La Gloria; Las Delicias; Las Tablas	Changuinola
Chiriquí Grande	Bajo Cedro; Chiriquí Grande; Miramar; Punte Peña; Punta Robalo; Rambala	Chiriquí Grande

=== Province of Chiriquí ===
Districts of Chiriquí.

District	Corregimientos	District seat
Alanje	Santiago de Alanje; Canta Gallo; Divalá; El Tejar; Guarumal; Nuevo México; Palo Grande; Querevalo; Santo Tomás	Santiago de Alanje
Barú	Baco; Limones; Manaca; Progreso; Puerto Tomás Armuelles; Rodolfo Aguilar Delgado	Puerto Tomás Armuelles
Boquerón	Bágala; Boquerón; Cordillera; Guabal; Guayabal; Paraíso; Pedregal; Tijeras	Boquerón
Boquete	Alto Boquete; Bajo Boquete; Caldera; Jaramillo; Los Naranjos; Palmira	Bajo Boquete
Bugaba	Aserrío de Gariché; Bugaba; El Bongo; Gómez; La Concepción; La Estrella; San Andrés; Santa Marta; Santa Rosa; Santo Domingo; Sortová; Solano	La Concepción
David	Bijagual; Cochea; Chiriquí; San José de David; Guacá; Las Lomas; Pedregal; San Carlos; San Pablo Nuevo; San Pablo Viejo	San José de David
Dolega	San Francisco de Dolega; Dos Ríos; Los Algarrobos; Los Anastacios; Potrerillos; Potrerillos Abajo; Rovira; Tinajas	San Francisco de Dolega
Gualaca	Gualaca; Hornito; Los Angeles; Paja de Sombrero; Rincón	Gualaca
Remedios	El Nancito; El Porvenir; El Puerto; Nuestra Señora de los Remedios; Santa Lucía	Nuestra Señora de los Remedios
Renacimiento	Breñón; Cañas Gordas; Dominical; Monte Lirio; Plaza de Caisán; Río Sereno; Santa Clara; Santa Cruz	Río Sereno
San Félix	Juay; Lajas Adentro; Las Lajas; San Félix; Santa Cruz	Las Lajas
San Lorenzo	Boca Chica; Boca del Monte; Horconcitos; San Juan; San Lorenzo	Horconcitos
Tolé	Bella Vista; Cerro Viejo; El Cristo; Justo Fidel Palacios; Lajas de Tolé; Potrero de Caña; Quebrada de Piedra; Tolé; Veladero	Tolé
Tierras Altas	Cerro Punta; Cuesta de Piedra; Nueva California; Paso Ancho; Volcán	Volcán

=== Province of Coclé ===
Districts of Coclé.

District	Corregimientos	District seat
Aguadulce	San Juan Bautista de Aguadulce; Barrios Unidos; El Cristo; El Roble; Pocrí	San Juan Bautista de Aguadulce
Antón	Antón; Caballero; Cabuya; El Chirú; El Retiro; El Valle; Juan Díaz; Río Hato; San Juan de Dios; Santa Rita	Antón
La Pintada	El Harino; El Potrero; La Pintada; Las Lomas; Llano Grande; Llano Norte; Piedras Gordas	La Pintada
Natá	Capellanía; El Caño; Guzmán; Las Huacas; Natá de los Caballeros; Toza	Natá de los Caballeros
Olá	El Copé; El Palmar; El Picacho; La Pava; Olá	Olá
Penonomé	Cañaveral; Chiguirí Arriba; Coclé; El Coco; El Silencio; El Valle de San Miguel; Los Uveros; Pajonal; Penonomé; Río Grande; Río Indio; Toabré; Tulú; Vista Hermosa	Penonomé

=== Province of Colón ===
Districts of Colón before 2018, when Omar Torrijos Herrera District was created.

District	Corregimientos	District seat
Colón	Barrio Norte; Barrio Sur; Buena Vista; Cativá; Ciricito; Cristóbal; Cristóbal Este; Escobal; Limón; Nueva Providencia; Puerto Pilón; Sabanitas; Salamanca; San Juan; Santa Rosa	Colón
Chagres	Achiote; El Guabo; La Encantada; Nuevo Chagres; Palmas Bellas; Piña; Salud	Nuevo Chagres
Donoso	Coclé del Norte; El Guásimo; Gobea; Miguel de la Borda; Río Indio	Miguel de la Borda
Omar Torrijos Herrera	Nueva Esperanza; San Juan de Turbe; San José del General	San José del General
Portobelo	Cacique; Garrote; Isla Grande; María Chiquita; San Felipe de Portobelo	San Felipe de Portobelo
Santa Isabel	Cuango; Miramar; Nombre de Dios; Palenque; Palmira; Playa Chiquita; Santa Isabel; Viento Frío	Palenque

=== Province of Darién ===
Districts of Darién.

District	Corregimientos	District seat
Chepigana	Agua Fría; Camoganti; Chepigana; Cucunatí; Garachiné; Jaqué; La Palma; Puerto Piña; Río Congo Arriba; Río Congo; Río Iglesias; Sambú; Santa Fe; Setegantí; Taimatí; Tucutí	La Palma
Pinogana	Boca de Cupe; El Real de Santa María; Metetí; Paya; Pinogana; Púcuro; Yape; Yaviza; Wargandí	El Real de Santa María

=== Province of Herrera ===
Districts of Herrera.

District	Corregimientos	District seat
Chitré	Chitré; La Arena; Llano Bonito; San Miguel de Monagrillo; San Juan Bautista	Chitré
Las Minas	Las Minas; Chepo; Chumical; El Toro; Leones; Quebrada del Rosario; Quebrada El Ciprián	Las Minas
Los Pozos	El Calabacito; El Capurí; El Cedro; La Arena; La Pitaloza; Las Llanas; Los Cerritos; Los Cerros de Paja; Los Pozos	Los Pozos
Ocú	Cerro Largo; El Tijera; Entradero del Castillo; Llano Grande; Los Llanos; Menchaca; San Sebastián de Ocú; Peñas Chatas	San Sebastián de Ocú
Parita	Cabuya; Llano de la Cruz; Los Castillos; París; Parita; Portobelillo; Potuga	Parita
Pesé	El Barrero; El Ciruelo; El Pájaro; El Pedregoso; Las Cabras; Pesé (capital); Rincón Hondo; Sabanagrande	Pesé
Santa María	Chupampa; El Limón; El Rincón; Los Canelos; Santa María	Santa María

=== Province of Los Santos ===
Districts of Los Santos.

District	Corregimientos	District seat
Guararé	El Espinal; El Hato; El Macano; Guararé Arriba; Guararé; La Enea; La Pasera; Las Trancas; Llano Abajo; Perales	Guararé
Las Tablas	Bajo Corral; Bayano; El Carate; El Cocal; El Manantial; El Muñoz; El Pedregoso; El Sesteadero; La Laja; La Miel; La Palma; La Tiza; Las Palmitas; Las Tablas Abajo; Santa Librada de Las Tablas; Nuario; Palmira; Peña Blanca; Río Hondo; San José; San Miguel; Santo Domingo; Valle Rico; Vallerriquito	Santa Librada de Las Tablas
Los Santos	Agua Buena; El Ejido; El Guásimo; La Colorada; La Espigadilla; La Villa de los Santos; Las Cruces; Las Guabas; Llano Largo; Los Angeles; Los Olivos; Sabanagrande; Santa Ana; Tres Quebradas; Villa Lourdes	La Villa de los Santos
Macaracas	Bahía Honda; Bajos de Guera; Chupa; Corozal; El Cedro; Espino Amarillo; La Mesa; Las Palmas; Llano de Piedra; Macaracas; Mogollón	Macaracas
Pedasí	Los Asientos; Mariabé; Oria Arriba; Pedasí; Purio	Pedasí
Pocrí	El Cañafístulo; Lajamina; Paraíso; Paritilla; Pocrí	Pocrí
Tonosí	Altos de Guera; Cambutal; Cañas; El Bebedero; El Cacao; El Cortezo; Flores; Guánico; Isla de Cañas; La Tronosa; Tonosí	Tonosí

=== Province of Panamá ===
Districts of Panamá.

District	Corregimientos	District seat
Balboa	La Ensenada; La Esmeralda; La Guinea; Pedro González; Saboga; San Miguel	San Miguel
Chepo	Cañita; Chepillo; San Cristóbal de Chepo; El Llano; Las Margaritas; Santa Cruz de Chinina; Tortí; Madungandí	San Cristóbal de Chepo
Chimán	Brujas; Chimán; Gonzalo Vásquez; Pásiga; Unión Santeña	Chimán
Panamá	24 de Diciembre; Alcalde Díaz; Ancón; Bella Vista; Betania; Caimitillo; Calidonia; Chilibre; Curundú; El Chorrillo; Ernesto Córdoba Campos; Juan Díaz; Las Cumbres; Las Mañanitas; Pacora; Parque Lefevre; Pedregal; Pueblo Nuevo; Río Abajo; San Felipe; San Francisco; San Martín; Santa Ana; Tocumen	Panama City
San Miguelito	Amelia Denis de Icaza; Arnulfo Arias; Belisario Frías; Belisario Porras; José Domingo Espinar; Mateo Iturralde; Omar Torrijos; Rufina Alfaro; Victoriano Lorenzo	San Miguelito City
Taboga	Otoque Occidente; Otoque Oriente; Taboga	Taboga

=== Province of Panamá Oeste ===
Districts of Panamá Oeste.

District	Corregimientos	District seat
Arraiján	Arraiján; Burunga; Cerro Silvestre; Juan Demóstenes Arosemena; Nuevo Emperador; Santa Clara; Veracruz; Vista Alegre	Arraiján
Capira	Caimito; Campana; Capira; Cermeño; Cirí de Los Sotos; Cirí Grande; El Cacao; La Trinidad; Las Ollas Arriba; Lídice; Santa Rosa; Villa Carmen; Villa Rosario	Capira
Chame	Bejuco; Buenos Aires; Cabuya; Chame; Chicá; El Líbano; Las Lajas; Nueva Gorgona; Punta Chame; Sajalices; Sorá	Chame
La Chorrera	Amador; Arosemena; Barrio Balboa; Barrio Colón; El Arado; El Coco; Feuillet; Guadalupe; Herrera; Hurtado; Iturralde; La Represa; Los Díaz; Mendoza; Obaldía; Playa Leona; Puerto Caimito; Santa Rita	La Chorrera
San Carlos	El Espino; El Higo; Guayabito; La Ermita; La Laguna; Las Uvas; Los Llanitos; San Carlos Borromeo; San José	San Carlos Borromeo

=== Province of Veraguas ===
Districts of Veraguas.

District	Corregimientos	District seat
Atalaya	Jesús Nazareno de Atalaya; El Barrito; La Carrillo; La Montañuela; San Antonio	Jesús Nazareno de Atalaya
Calobre	Barnizal; Calobre; Chitra; El Cocla; El Potrero; La Laguna; La Raya de Calobre; La Tetilla; La Yeguada; Las Guías; Monjarás; San José	Calobre
Cañazas	San Francisco Javier de Cañazas; Cerro de Plata; El Aromillo; El Picador; Las Cruces; Los Valles; San José; San Marcelo	San Francisco Javier de Cañazas
La Mesa	Bisvalles; Boró; El Higo; La Mesa; Llano Grande; Los Milagros; San Bartolo	La Mesa
Las Palmas	Cerro de Casa; Corozal; El María; El Prado; El Rincón; Las Palmas; Lolá; Manuel Encarnación Amador Terreros; Pixvae; Puerto Vidal; San Martín de Porres; Viguí; Zapotillo	Las Palmas
Mariato	Arenas; El Cacao; Mariato; Quebro; Tebario	Mariato
Montijo	Cébaco; Costa Hermosa; Isla Gobernadora; La Garceana; Leones; Montijo; Pilón; Unión del Norte	Montijo
Río de Jesús	Catorce de Noviembre; Las Huacas; Los Castillos; Nuevo San Juan; La Ermita de Río de Jesús; Utira	La Ermita de Río de Jesús
San Francisco	Corral Falso; Los Hatillos; Remance; San Francisco de la Montaña; San José; San Juan	San Francisco de la Montaña
Santa Fe	Calovébora; El Alto; El Cuay; El Pantano; Gatuncito; Río Luis; Rubén Cantú; Santa Fe	Santa Fe
Santiago	Canto del Llano; Carlos Santana Ávila; Edwin Fábrega; El Llanito; La Colorada; La Peña; La Raya de Santa María; La Soledad; Los Algarrobos; Ponuga; Rincón Largo; San Martín de Porres; San Pedro del Espino; Santiago Apóstol de Veraguas; Urracá	Santiago Apóstol de Veraguas
Soná	Bahía Honda; Calidonia; Cativé; El Marañón; Guarumal; Hicaco; La Soledad; Quebrada de Oro; Río Grande; Rodeo Viejo; Soná	Soná

=== Comarca Emberá-Wounaan ===
Districts of Emberá-Wounaan.

District	Corregimientos	District seat
Cémaco	Cirilo Guainora; Lajas Blancas; Manuel Ortega	Unión Chocó
Sambú	Jingurudó; Río Sabalo	Puerto Indio

=== Comarca Guna Yala ===
Districts of Guna Yala.

District	Corregimientos	District seat
n/a	Ailigandí; Narganá; Puerto Obaldía; Tubualá	El Porvenir

=== Comarca Ngäbe-Buglé ===
Districts of Ngäbe-Buglé.

District	Corregimientos	District seat
Besikó	Boca de Balsa; Camarón Arriba; Cerro Banco; Cerro de Patena; Emplanada de Chorcha; Nämnoní; Niba; Soloy	Soloy
Kankintú	Bisira; Büri; Guariviara; Guoroni; Kankintú; Mününi; Piedra Roja; Tuwai; Man Creek	Bisira
Kusapín	Bahía Azul; Calovébora o Santa Catalina; Kusapín; Río Chiriquí; Tobobé; Loma Yuca; Valle Bonito	Kusapín
Mironó	Cascabel; Hato Corotú; Hato Culantro; Hato Jobo; Hato Julí; Hato Pilón; Quebrada de Loro; Salto Dupí	Hato Pilón
Müna	Alto Caballero; Bakama; Cerro Caña; Cerro Puerco; Chichica; Dikeri; Diko; Kikari; Krüa; Maraca; Mreeni; Nibra; Peña Blanca; Roka; Sitio Prado; Umaní	Chichica
Nole Düima	Cerro Iglesias; Hato Chamí; Jädaberi; Lajero; Susama	Cerro Iglesias
Ñürüm	Agua de Salud; Alto de Jesús; Buenos Aires; Cerro Pelado; El Bale; El Paredón; El Peñón; El Piro Nº2; El Piro; Guayabito; Güibale	Buenos Aires
Jirondai	Burí; Guariviara; Man Creek; Samboa; Tuwai	Samboa
Santa Catalina o Calovébora	Alto Bilingüe; Loma Yuca; San Pedrito; Santa Catalina o Calovébora (Bledeshia); Valle Bonito	Santa Catalina o Calovébora (Bledeshia)

=== Comarca Naso Tjër Di ===
District	Corregimientos
Special Naso Tjër Di District	Teribe; San San Drui; Bonyik
