= 2000 Panamanian census =

The 2000 Panamanian census gathered important demographic and economic data for the Panama. It was the tenth national census of population and sixth of housing. It was conducted on May 14, 2000, by the Republic of Panama General Directorate of Statistics and Census.
