= Caldera (disambiguation) =

A caldera is a volcanic feature formed by the collapse of land following a volcanic eruption.

Caldera may also refer to:

== Arts and entertainment ==
- Caldera (band), an American band
  - Caldera (Caldera album), 1976
- Caldera (Sam Rivers album), 2022
- "Caldera" (song), 1976
- Caldera (film), a 2012 animated short film
- La Caldera, an audiovisual NFT collection by Colombian singer-songwriter Shakira

=== Fictional elements ===
- Caldera, a city in the video game Red Steel 2
- Caldera, a city in the video game Morrowind
- Caldera, an island in the video game Call of Duty: Warzone
- Caldera, a town/fortress in the video game Risen 2: Dark Waters
- Dr. Caldera, a character in Better Call Saul

== Businesses ==
- Caldera (company), a US-based software company 1994–2002
  - Caldera UK, a subsidiary 1996–1999
  - Caldera Deutschland, a subsidiary 1995–2001
  - Caldera Thin Clients, later Lineo, a subsidiary formed in 1998
  - Caldera Systems, later Caldera International, a subsidiary formed in 1998
  - Caldera International, successor to Caldera Systems from 2001
    - Caldera K.K., a Japanese subsidiary formed in 2001
  - Caldera OpenLinux, a Linux distribution often called "Caldera"
- Caldera (France), or Caldera Graphics SAS, an unrelated imaging software company founded in 1991

== People ==
- C. T. Caldera, chief of staff of the Sri Lanka Army 1976–1977
- Henry Caldera (1937–2007), Sri Lankan singer, songwriter, and musician
- Henry Caldera (football manager) (born 1959), Curaçao professional football manager
- Jorge Herrera Caldera (born 1963), Mexican politician and Governor of Durango
- Junior Caldera, French disc jockey
- Louis Caldera (born 1956), American politician
- Marcelo Alberto Bielsa Caldera (born 1955), Argentine football manager
- María Lourdes Caldera (born 1983), Venezuelan pageant titleholder
- Miguel Caldera (1548–1597), figure in the Spanish conquest of the Aztec Empire of Mexico
- Rafael Caldera (1916–2009), former president of Venezuela
- Rafael Antonio Bielsa Caldera (born 1953), Argentinian politician
- Renzo Caldera (or Caldara), Italian bobsledder

== Places ==
- Caldera, Chile
  - Caldera Basin
- Caldera District, Esparza, Costa Rica
- Caldera Port, Puntarenas, Costa Rica
- Caldera (Equatorial Guinea), a volcano
- Caldera, Chiriquí, Panama
- Caldera River, Panama
- La Caldera, Salta Province, Argentina

== See also ==
- Caldara, a surname
- Candela (disambiguation)
- Lycinus caldera, mygalomorph spider of Chile
- Caldera v. Microsoft, an antitrust lawsuit
