= Boquete =

Boquete may refer to:

== People ==
- Andrea Boquete (born 1990), Argentine basketball player
- Verónica Boquete (born 1987), Spanish footballer

== Places ==
- Alto Boquete, corregimiento in Boquete District, Chiriquí Province, Panama
- Boquete, Chiriquí, town and capital of the Boquete District, Chiriquí Province, Panama
- Boquete District, district in Chiriquí Province, Panama
