= Căldărușa =

Căldăruşa may refer to several villages in Romania:

- Căldăruşa, a village in Traian Commune, Brăila County
- Căldăruşa, a village in Cernăteşti Commune, Buzău County

and to:

- Căldăruşa (grape), a Romanian/Moldovan wine grape that is also known as Băbească neagră

== See also ==
- Căldăraru (disambiguation)
- Căldărești River (disambiguation)
- Caldera (disambiguation)
