= Candela (disambiguation) =

The candela is a unit of luminous intensity.

Candela may also refer to:

== Places ==
- Candela, Apulia, comune in the Province of Foggia, Italy
- Candela Municipality, municipio in Coahuila, Mexico
- Candela, Coahuila, community in Coahuila State, Mexico
- Candela River, tributary of the Rio Salado, Mexico
- Candelas, Colorado, a planned community in Arvada, Colorado, United States

== People ==
=== Association football ===
- Candela Andújar (born 2000), Spanish football forward
- Candela (footballer) (born 1987), Spanish footballer
- Álvaro Giménez Candela (born 1991), Spanish footballer
- Antonio Candela (born 2000), Italian professional footballer
- Iván Menéndez Candela (born 1978), Spanish retired footballer
- Paco Candela (born 1993), Spanish footballer
- Vincent Candela (born 1973), former French footballer
- Vincenzo Candela (born 1994), Colombian footballer

=== Others ===
==== Given name ====
- Candela Ferro (born 1973), Argentine journalist, model, and television host
- Candela Peña (born 1973), Spanish actress
- Candela Sierra, Spanish comic book writer and artist
- Candela Vetrano (born 1991), Argentine actress, singer and model

==== Surname ====
- Estrella Cabeza Candela (born 1987), Spanish professional tennis player
- Félix Candela (1910-1997), Spanish architect
- Hilario Candela (1934-2022), Cuban-born American architect
- Rosario Candela, Italian born American architect

== Music ==
=== Bands ===
- Candela (American band)
- Candela (Swedish band)
- Candelas (band), Welsh band

=== Albums and songs ===
- Candela (album), 2019
  - "Candela", the album's title track
- Candela, a 2013 album by Mice Parade
- "Candela", a song by Bad Gyal from Worldwide Angel
- "Candela", a song by Buena Vista Social Club from Buena Vista Social Club
- "Candela", a song from Chiquititas Vol. 5
- "Candela", a song by Chayanne from Simplemente
- "Candela", a song by Noelia from Noelia

== Other uses ==
- Candela (tobacco), type of tobacco
- Candela Hotel & Residences, a proposed skyscraper in Seattle, which was never built
- Candela, the leader of Team Valor in the mobile game Pokémon Go

== See also ==
- Caldera (disambiguation)
