= Caldara =

Caldara is a surname. Notable people with the surname include:

- Antonio Caldara (1670–1736), Italian composer
- Domenico Caldara (1814–1897), Italian painter
- Emilio Caldara (1868–1942), Italian Socialist Party politician
- Jon Caldara, American libertarian activist
- Mattia Caldara (born 1994), Italian footballer
- Orme Caldara (1875–1925), American stage actor
- Polidoro Caldara (c. 1499–1543), Italian painter
- Renzo Caldara (born 1943), Italian bobsledder
