= Căldărești River =

Căldărești River may refer to the following rivers in Romania:

- Căldărești, a tributary of the Crișul Negru in Arad County
- Căldărești, a tributary of the Slănic in Buzău County

== See also ==
- Căldăraru (disambiguation)
- Căldărușa (disambiguation)
