= Los Naranjos, Chiriquí =

Coordinates: 8.7928°N 82.4446°W

Los Naranjos
- Corregimiento
- Location within Panama
- Country: Panama
- Province: Chiriquí
- District: Boquete
- Established: July 29, 1998

Area
  - Land: 98.9 km^{2} (38.2 sq mi)

Population (2010)
  - Total: 4,596
  - Density: 46.5/km^{2} (120/sq mi)
- Population density calculated based on land area.
- Time zone: UTC−5 (EST)

Los Naranjos is a corregimiento in Boquete District, Chiriquí Province, Panama. It has a land area of 98.9 square kilometres (38.2 sq mi) and had a population of 4,596 as of 2010, giving it a population density of 46.5 inhabitants per square kilometre (120/sq mi). It was created by Law 58 of July 29, 1998, owing to the Declaration of Unconstitutionality of Law 1 of 1982. Its population as of 2000 was 4,455.
