= Palmira, Chiriquí =

Coordinates: 8.7167°N 82.4500°W

Palmira
- Corregimiento
- Location within Panama
- Country: Panama
- Province: Chiriquí
- District: Boquete

Area
  - Land: 57.5 km^{2} (22.2 sq mi)

Population (2010)
  - Total: 1,776
  - Density: 30.9/km^{2} (80/sq mi)
- Population density calculated based on land area.
- Time zone: UTC−5 (EST)

Palmira is a corregimiento in Boquete District, Chiriquí Province, Panama. It has a land area of 57.5 square kilometres (22.2 sq mi) and had a population of 1,776 as of 2010, giving it a population density of 30.9 inhabitants per square kilometre (80/sq mi). Its population as of 1990 was 2,043; its population as of 2000 was 1,513. There are three urban areas with some limited housing density. They are Palmira Centro, Palmira Arriba and Palmira Abajo. Palmira has excellent soil, abundant rivers and creeks and grows a variety of vegetables, fruits and coffee. There is also some meat production.
