= Boquete District =

- District
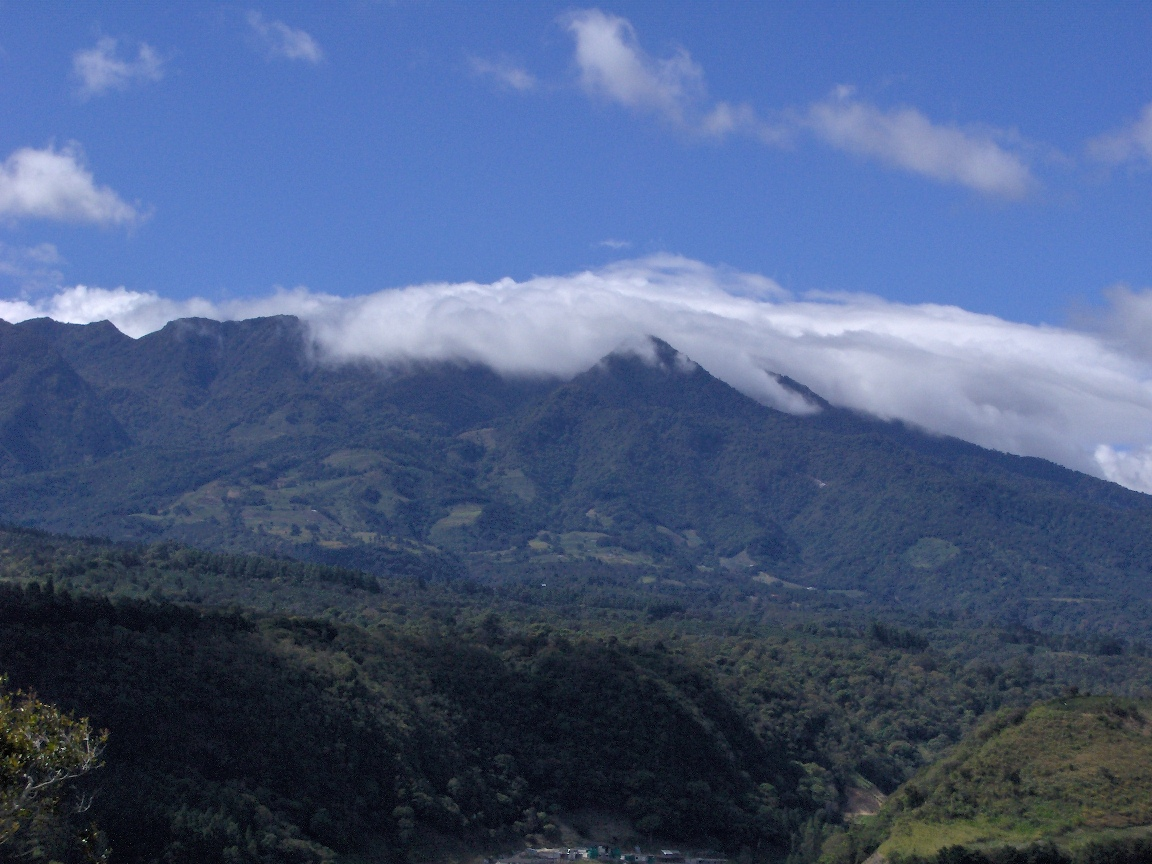

- Location of the district capital in Panama
- Coordinates: 8°30′0″N 82°33′36″W
- Country: Panama
- Province: Chiriquí Province
- Capital: Bajo Boquete

Area
  - Total: 189 sq mi (489 km^{2})

Population (2000)
  - Total: 16,943
- Time zone: UTC-5 (ETZ)

Boquete District is a district (distrito) of Chiriquí Province in Panama located on the North of the Chiriqui Province, in the western side of the country. The population according to the 2010 census was 22,435. The district covers a total area of 488.48 square kilometres (188.60 sq mi).

The town is well known for its subtropical highland climate, unlike the rest of the country, due to its location in the Cordillera Central. The capital lies at the city of Bajo Boquete.

== Administrative divisions ==
Boquete District is divided administratively into the following corregimientos:

- Alto Boquete
- Bajo Boquete (capital)
- Caldera
- Jaramillo
- Los Naranjos
- Palmira

== History ==
According to archeological information, the nearby area of the Baru Volcano was the place of the first chiefdoms and agricultural societies on what is now the Panama–Costa Rica border, with man-made pottery carbon dated by archaeologists at the Barriles Site Barriles to 300 BC. In Caldera there are also petroglyphs that witness the presence of Isthmo-Colombian villages in this region. During the Spanish Colonization of the Americas, the district of Boquete, along with the rest of the Talamanca highlands, were isolated due to the topographical character of the area, serving as a refuge for the Ngöbe Buglé peoples.

It is not until the 19th century, when colonization of the Boquete region began, with population from Gualaca, Bugaba, David and a community of foreigners (mostly French and Germans) and some north Americans who started the growing of coffee, vegetables and the cattle raising. This immigration influenced the architectonic esthetic of the houses in Boquete and its town too. In 1907, the area had 6 villages: Lino, Bajo Boquete, Quiel, Bajo de Monos, Los Naranjos, Jaramillos and Palos Bobos (today Palmira); and it was made the first agricultural census by the Panamanian new government and it shows that the main activity of the population was cultivation of Arabica coffee that start to be well known because it richest cup flavor. It was part of the district of David, nonetheless, the distance and the poor communication with the city of David and Boquete, brought as consequence that the population decided the creation of a new district.

With the law 20 of the January, 17th, 1911, was declared formally the Boquete district as part of the Chiriqui province. As an additional condition, was necessary to add the township of Caldera and the village of El Frances. The first Mayor was Mr. Felipe Gonzales.

Initially, the capital of the district was located in the community of Alto Lino, where there were more inhabitants and it had some facilities. However, the inhabitants made a request to move the capital to Bajo Boquete, due to its central location in the district. Although the change had been made unofficially, it was not made effective until the promulgation of Law 103 of 1941.

In 1950, the town started to celebrate the local Festival of the Coffee. On April 9, 1970, due to a serious flood that caused damages and the deaths of 8 people, the festival was suspended until next year. In 1973, the Festival of the Coffee turned into the Feria de las Flores y del Café.

Until 1998, there were only three townships: Bajo Boquete, Caldera and Palmira; that same year the townships of Alto Boquete, Jaramillo and Los Naranjos were formed.
