= Fluid Motion (album) =

Live album by Fluid Motion
- Released: 2002
- Recorded: January 3, 2002
- Venues: Springs Theatre, Tampa, Florida
- Genre: Free jazz
- Length: 50:21
- Labels: Isospin Labs iso-42057
- Producer: David Manson

Sam Rivers chronology
Firestorm (2001)	Fluid Motion (2002)	Celebration (2004)

Fluid Motion is a live album by the jazz ensemble of the same name. Led by trombonist and composer David Manson, and featuring guest artist Sam Rivers on saxophone, it was recorded on January 3, 2002, at Springs Theatre in Tampa, Florida, and was released later that year by Isospin Labs. On the album, Manson and Rivers are joined by trumpeter Jonathan Powell, plus double bassist Doug Mathews and drummer Anthony Cole, both of whom were regular members of Rivers's trio.

== Reception ==
Professional ratings
Review scores
Source	Rating
AllMusic	3.5/5 stars
The Penguin Guide to Jazz	3/4 stars
Tom Hull – on the Web	B+

In a review for All About Jazz, Mark Corroto wrote: "This quintet comes out kicking ass... there is something special happening here... While the frontline is searching outward, the rhythm section centers the groove throughout and their groove is nicely mixed in the forefront." AAJ's Glenn Astarita called the album an "incontestably superb effort," and stated: "this band packs a punch amid shifting rhythms that develop with the vitality of an unexpected windstorm... At times, the band purveys a 60s style 'Blue Note Records,' sound! But, the thrust of this outing is founded upon bouncy rhythmic structures to coincide with the artists' expressive unison choruses... Zealously recommended."

Writing for JazzTimes, Duck Baker commented: "Fluid Motion serves both as a reminder of the presence of a lion in our midst and a promise of brilliant things to come from Manson and Powell. But it is the beautiful way that it all comes together that earns my vote for jazz record of the year."

The authors of The Penguin Guide to Jazz Recordings noted that "Sam's dry and laconic saxophone style is well to the fore," but warned that "the recording and mastering leave something to be desired."

Critic and author Nat Hentoff singled out Jonathan Powell for praise, writing: "Powell's crackling range and the electricity of his imagination reminded me of the first time I heard Lee Morgan and Clifford Brown... His voice is his own, as is that of the always-contemporary seventy-nine-year-old Sam Rivers."

Frank Rubolino of One Final Note remarked: "this music, which contains haunting melodies and exciting playing throughout, is very much a group effort... any chance to hear Rivers is a worthy endeavor, and this performance only reinforces why that is so. Manson and Powell play with decided ease with Rivers' group, making the set a true delight."

Creative Loafing's Eric Snider stated that the album "bustles with vitality," with sound that has "a depth and overall liveness generally missing from large-label efforts." He also praised the "challenging tunes that straddle the line between post-bop and avant-garde."

== Track listing ==
Composed by David Manson.

1. "Fluid Motion" – 7:07
2. "Poodle Science" – 4:53
3. "Tephlon" – 6:13
4. "Whispers" – 6:48
5. "Pengquan" – 7:29
6. "Crossdrift" – 7:09
7. "Following" – 5:14
8. "Tangents" – 5:28

== Personnel ==
- David Manson – trombone
- Sam Rivers – tenor saxophone, soprano saxophone
- Jonathan Powell – trumpet
- Doug Mathews – double bass
- Anthony Cole – drums
