= Undulation =

Undulation may refer to:

- Undulation of the geoid, the separation between the geoid and the reference ellipsoid of the Earth
- Undulation point, a point on a curve where the curvature vanishes but does not change sign
- Undulatory locomotion, the most primitive of vertebrate locomotor patterns
- In botany, a wave shaped part such as a leaf
- Undulation (album), a 2021 live album by Sam Rivers
