= Caldera (Sam Rivers album) =

Live album by Sam Rivers Trio
- Released: 2022
- Recorded: March 9, 2002
- Venues: Freeport-McMoRan Theatre, Contemporary Arts Center, New Orleans, Louisiana
- Genre: Free jazz
- Labels: NoBusiness; NBCD 155
- Producers: Danas Mikailionis, Ed Hazell, Valerij Anosov

Sam Rivers chronology
Undulation (2021)	Caldera (2022)

Caldera is a live album by the Sam Rivers Trio, led by multi-instrumentalist and composer Rivers, and featuring double bassist and bass clarinetist Doug Mathews and drummer and saxophonist Anthony Cole. It was recorded on March 9, 2002, at the Freeport-McMoRan Theatre, Contemporary Arts Center in New Orleans, Louisiana, and was released in 2022 by NoBusiness Records as volume 6 of the Sam Rivers Archive Series.

The Rivers Trio with this lineup also appeared on Concept (Rivbea, 1995–1996 [1997]), Firestorm (Rivbea, 2001), and Celebration (Posi-Tone, 2003 [2004]). Caldera is based on material selected from Rivers' massive recorded archives, which are curated by writer and producer Ed Hazell, who spent a year reviewing tapes with the goal of choosing the best recordings for release by NoBusiness Records.

== Reception ==
Professional ratings
Review scores
Source	Rating
All About Jazz	4/5 stars
All About Jazz	3.5/5 stars
Jazzwise	4/5 stars
Tom Hull – on the Web	A−

In a review for All About Jazz, Mark Corroto wrote: "Rivers never stopped his music growing, both in large and small ensembles. With this trio, he found the most sympathetic partners... Rivers and company traverse energy systems and the outer stratosphere with an ease only available to the tightest working ensembles." AAJ's John Sharpe stated that Rivers's music "confidently straddles the inside/outside dichotomy, a borderline which Matthews and Cole also navigate with thrilling ease. Caldera proves a fitting finale to a project which has amply reaffirmed Rivers' stature."

Kevin Le Gendre of Jazzwise commented: "This is arguably one of the most versatile trios you’ve probably never heard of... Rivers had a great ability to be as funky as free but he also wrote some sublime love songs, none more so than his alternative standard 'Beatrice', a perennial fan favourite that the group performs with exactly the right blend of tenderness and passion."

A writer for JazzBluesNews remarked: "it is noteworthy that Rivers' freely improvised saxophone solos do not run for as long as they once did... Rivers was seventy-eight when this album was recorded. Nonetheless, while he may have lost in quantity, he retained or even improved in quality... this sixth volume seems likely to reveal facets of Rivers' music that may not be familiar to all his devotees. Strongly recommended."

Jazz Weekly's George W. Harris called the concert "spontaneously combustible," and asked: "Anyone transcribing this?"

== Track listing ==
Composed by Sam Rivers.

1. "Improvisation I" – 17:20
2. "Bass solo" – 2:11
3. "Unity" – 4:09
4. "Beatrice" – 5:30
5. "Drum solo" – 2:58
6. "Improvisation II" – 11:19
7. "Offering" – 8:47
8. "Improvisation III" – 18:25

== Personnel ==
- Sam Rivers – tenor saxophone, soprano saxophone, flute, piano, vocals
- Doug Mathews – double bass, electric bass, bass clarinet
- Anthony Cole – drums, tenor saxophone, piano
