= Doug Mathews =

American musician

Doug Mathews is an American jazz electric bassist, double bassist, and bass clarinetist best known for being a former member of multi-instrumentalist Sam Rivers' trio.

== Career ==
Mathews became a member of Rivers' trio in 1993, two years after Rivers moved from New York to Florida, along with drummer Anthony Cole. The trio recorded three albums together: Firestorm (1998), Concept (1997), Caldera (2022). On the albums Concept and Caldera, Mathews played his second instrument, the bass clarinet, in order to form a woodwind trio with Cole on saxophone. Free jazz critic John Sharpe praised the group's collaboration, noting that Mathews' "bowing segues into a spirited conversation between Rivers' soprano wail and Cole's intertwining tenor". The trio with Mathews and Cole was described by Orlando Weekly writer Matt Gorney as "an almost vaudevillian, recombinant band offering free bop, out funk, ballads, ruminant impressionism and, of course, the fire." Mathews was known to attend concerts by Rivers' original trio (with Dave Holland on bass and Barry Altschul on drums) when they performed.

Mathews joined the quintet of trombonist David Manson for the album Fluid Motion (2002), which included the trio from the Caldera recording plus Manson and trumpeter Jonathan Powell.

In 2010, Mathews was part of a tribute performance to Jack Kerouac; other performers and contributors included poet Frank Messina, arranger David Amram, and drummer Michael Welsh. Three years later, Mathews joined resident guitarist Mary Halvorson at the Atlantic Center for the Arts along with saxophonist Dan Jordan, trombonist Keith Oshiro, saxophonist David Pate, trumpeter Tom Parmerter and drummer Tomas Fujiwara. In 2023, Mathews was a member of the New York All-Star RivBea Orchestra, a group paying tribute to Rivers.
