= Jaramillo, Chiriquí =

Coordinates: 8.7833°N 82.4333°W

Jaramillo
- Corregimiento
- Location within Panama
- Country: Panama
- Province: Chiriquí
- District: Boquete
- Established: July 29, 1998

Area
  - Land: 77.5 km^{2} (29.9 sq mi)

Population (2010)
  - Total: 2,655
  - Density: 34.3/km^{2} (89/sq mi)
- Population density calculated based on land area.
- Time zone: UTC−5 (EST)

Jaramillo is a corregimiento in Boquete District, Chiriquí Province, Panama. It has a land area of 77.5 square kilometres (29.9 sq mi) and had a population of 2,655 as of 2010, giving it a population density of 34.3 inhabitants per square kilometre (89/sq mi). It was created by Law 58 of July 29, 1998, owing to the Declaration of Unconstitutionality of Law 1 of 1982. Its population as of 2000 was 2,047.
