= Candela Municipality =

Municipality in the Mexican state of Coahuila

Candela
- Municipality
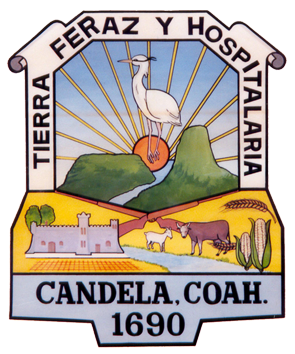
- Coat of arms

- Municipality of Candela in Coahuila
- Coordinates: 26°50′25″N 100°39′43″W
- Country: Mexico
- State: Coahuila
- Municipal seat: Candela

Area
  - Total: 2,305.5 km^{2} (890.2 sq mi)

Population (2005)
  - Total: 1,672

Candela is one of the 38 municipalities of Coahuila, in north-eastern Mexico. The municipal seat lies at Candela. The municipality covers an area of 2,305.5 km^{2}.

As of 2005, the municipality had a total population of 1,672.
