= Traian, Brăila =

Traian
- Commune
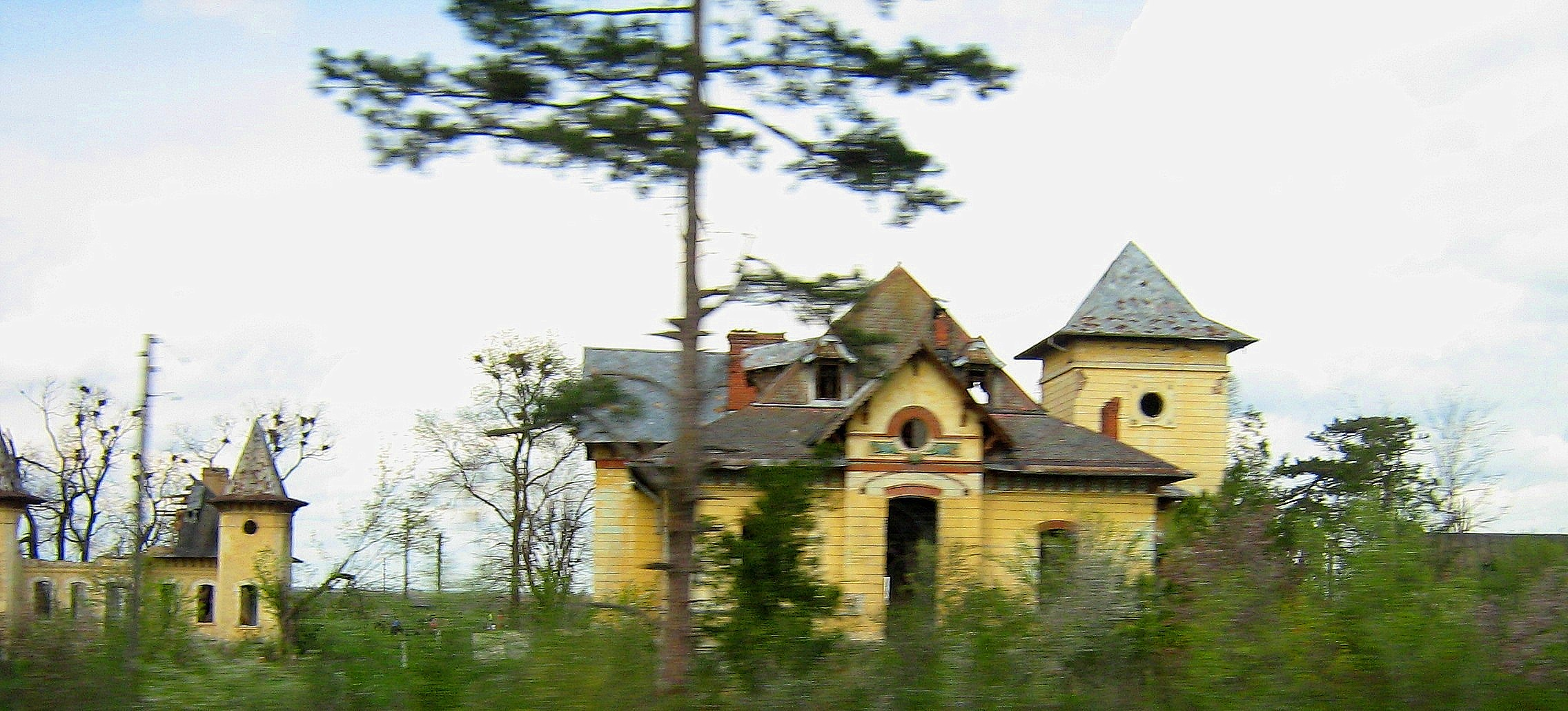
- Orezeanu mansion

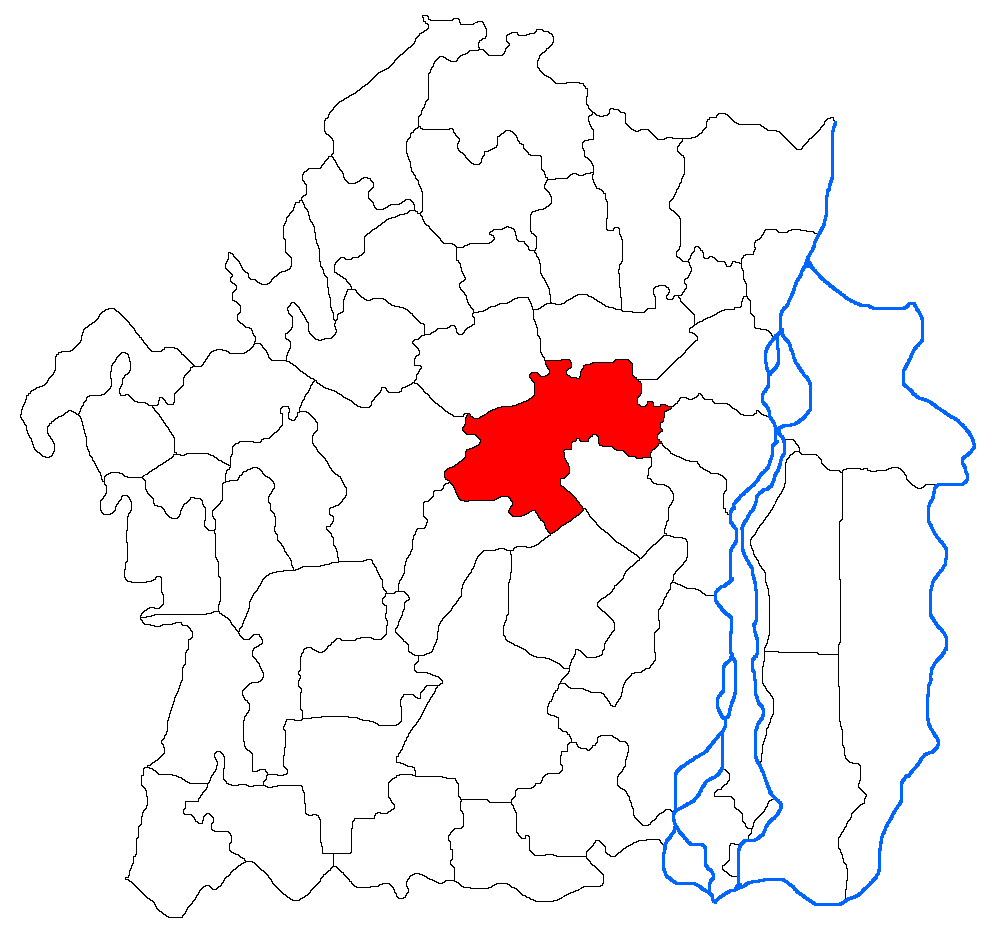
- Location in Brăila County

- Location in Romania
- Coordinates: 45°12′N 27°44′E
- Country: Romania
- County: Brăila

Government
  - Mayor (2020–2024): Nicușor Abăseacă (PSD)
- Area: 164.3 km^{2} (63.4 sq mi)
- Elevation: 10 m (33 ft)
- Population (2021-12-01): 2,990
  - Density: 18.2/km^{2} (47.1/sq mi)
- Time zone: UTC+02:00 (EET)
  - Summer (DST): UTC+03:00 (EEST)
- Postal code: 817175
- Area code: +(40) 239
- Vehicle reg.: BR
- Website: www.uat-traian.ro

Traian is a commune located in Brăila County, Muntenia, Romania. It is composed of four villages: Căldărușa, Silistraru, Traian, and Urleasca.

The commune is situated at the northern edge of the Bărăgan Plain, at an altitude of 10 m (33 ft). It is located in the central part of the county, 24 km (15 mi) southwest of the county seat, Brăila.

Traian is crossed north to south by county road DJ255A. A short distance to the south is national road DN2B, which runs from Buzău to Galați, and to the north is national road DN22, which runs from Râmnicu Sărat to Brăila and on to Constanța on the Black Sea coast.

The Urleasca and Traian village train stations serve the CFR Main Line 700, which connects Bucharest to Brăila, Galați, and the Moldova border at Giurgiulești.
