= Boquete, Chiriquí =

Boquete
- Corregimiento
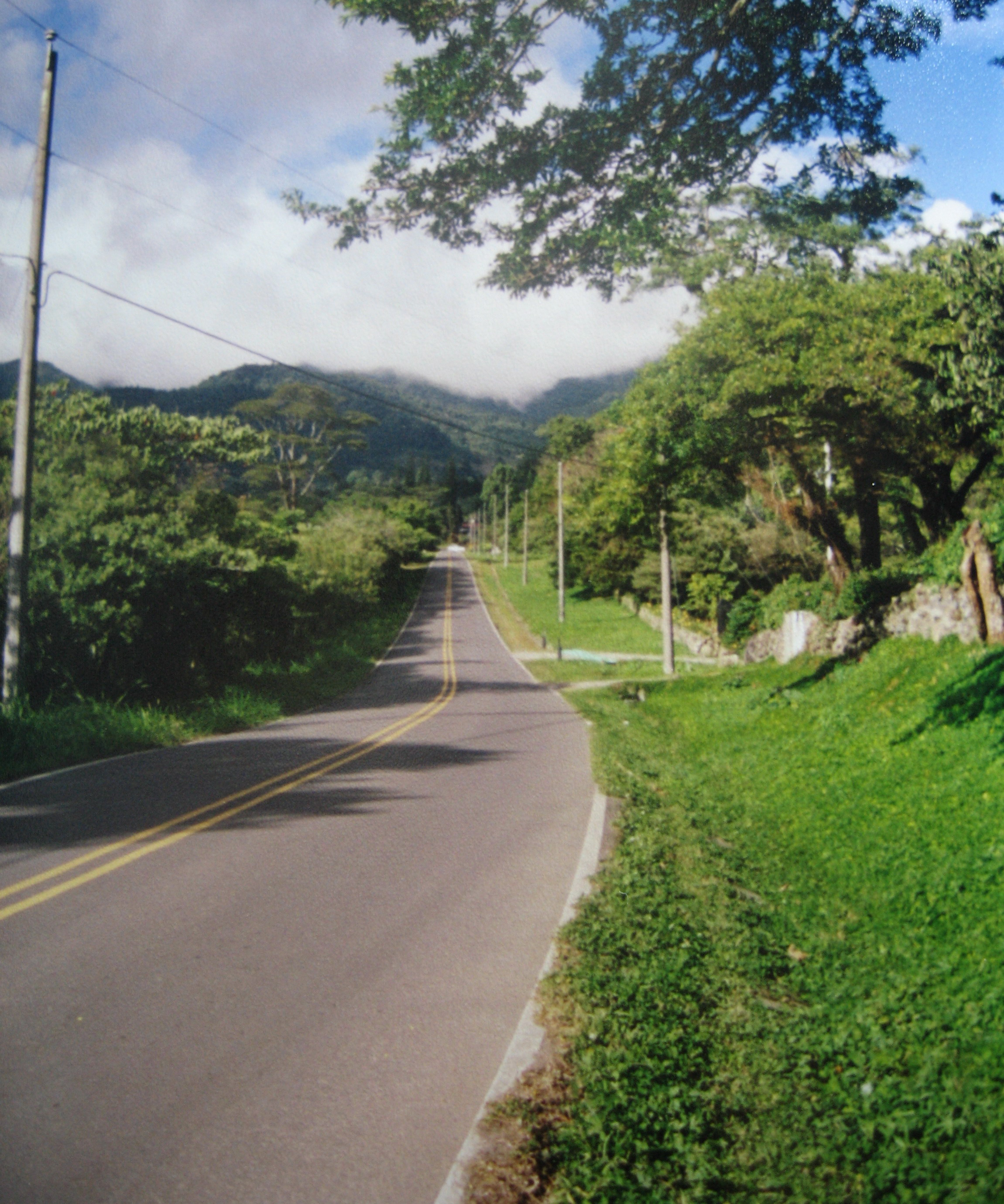
- Road that surrounds the city

- Location within Panama
- Coordinates: 8°46′48″N 82°26′24″W
- Country: Panama
- Province: Chiriquí
- District: Boquete

Area
  - Total: 488.4 km^{2} (188.6 sq mi)
- Highest elevation: 2,800 m (9,200 ft)
- Lowest elevation: 1,000 m (3,300 ft)

Population (2008)
  - Total: 19,000
  - Density: 43.76/km^{2} (113.3/sq mi)
- Time zone: EST
- Climate: Cfb 14 C to 22 degrees C.

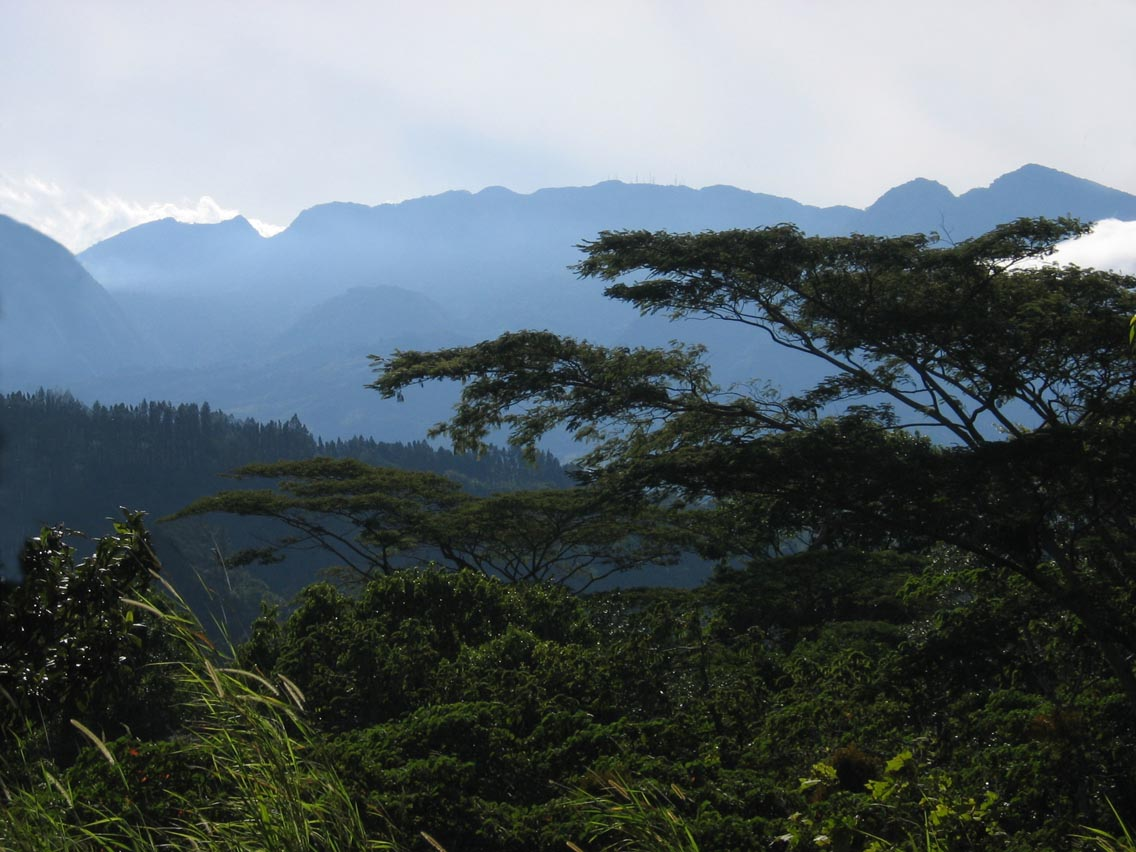
Hills of Boquete

Boquete is a small mountain town in Panama. It is located in the westernmost Province of Chiriquí, about 60 kilometres (37 mi) from the border with Costa Rica, and lies on the Caldera River, in Panama's green mountain highlands. Because of its elevation, some 1,200 metres (3,900 ft) above sea level, its climate is cooler than that of the lowlands. Its scenic location, temperature, and natural environment make it popular with Panamanians and attracts tourists and retirees from all over the world.

== History ==
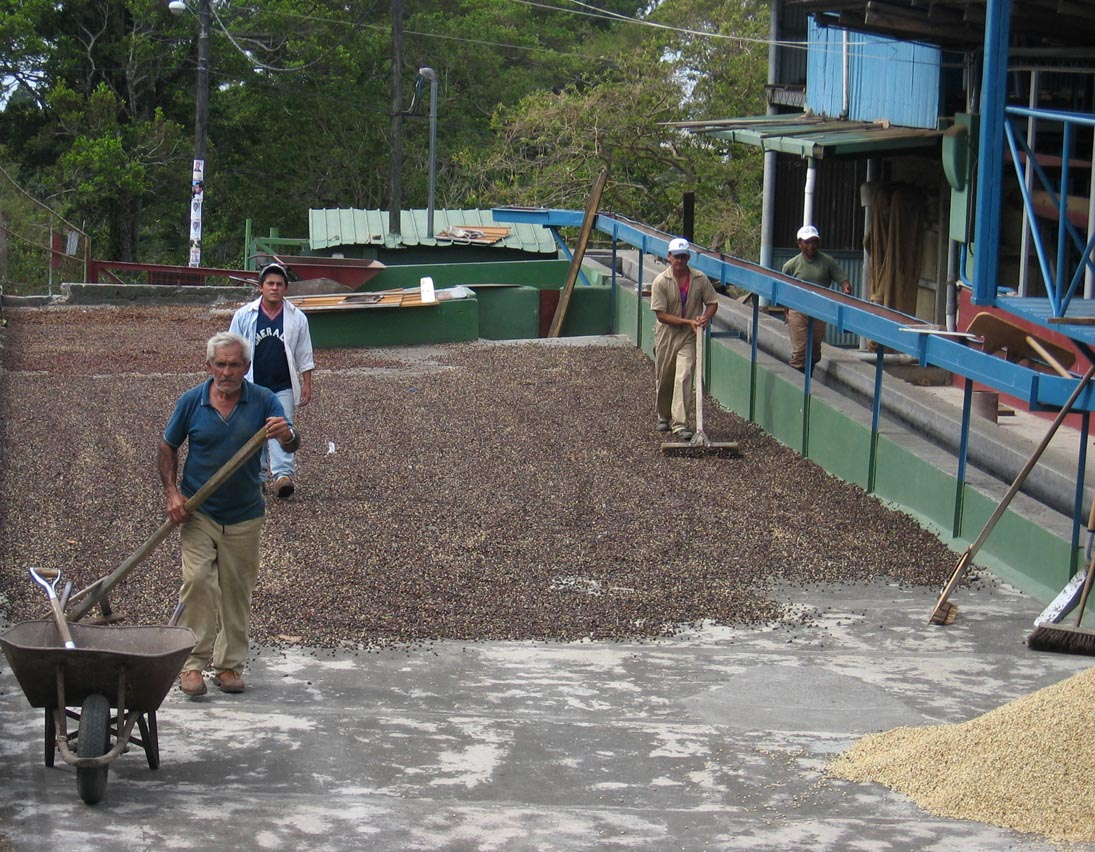
Traditional coffee-drying at the Alto Boquete plant of Cafe Ruiz

Archaeological studies support the idea that Boquete's history started sometime between 600 BC and 300 AD. In the Caldera region you can find petroglyphs (a rock carving, especially a prehistoric one) that are evidence of the ancient settlements in the area. During the Spanish colonization, the highlands area was an isolated refuge for the indigenous tribes like the Ngöbe and the Misquito due to the topographic terrain. The colonization of Boquete only began in earnest in the second half of the nineteenth century, by locals from Bugaba, Gualaca, and David, and foreigners from Yugoslavia, France, Germany, and other European countries. Colonizers also arrived from the United States, starting the first coffee plantations and agricultural farms. In Spanish, the word Boquete means 'gap or opening'. It was through this gap that curious gold seekers trekked, looking for a cheaper and quicker way to the Pacific. By the early twentieth century, several villages had been populated: Lino, Quiel, Bajo Mono, Los Naranjos, and Bajo Boquete, which now is the town center of the district.

The District of Boquete was founded on 11 April 1911. Initially, the capital of the district was Lino, but it moved soon after to Bajo Boquete. For many years, the district had three "corregimientos" (townships): Bajo Boquete, Caldera, and Palmira. In 1998, the "corregimientos" of Alto Boquete, Jaramillo, and Los Naranjos were created.

Despite the recent boom in tourism, its main industry remains agriculture, especially the growing of coffee beans.

== Culture ==
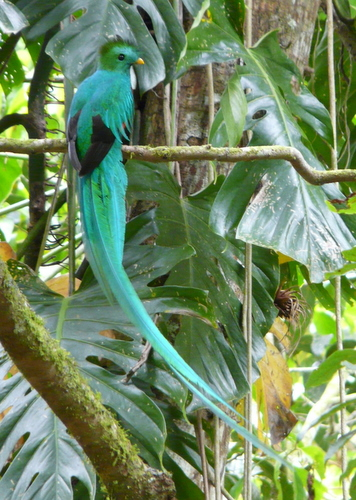
Resplendent Quetzal from tour with Boquete Mountain Safari, Quetzal Trail, Boquete, Panama

Boquete boasts a very lively music and arts scene. The annual Boquete Jazz Festival was founded in 2007 being the second largest jazz festival in the country after the Panama City Jazz Festival. Having been renamed Boquete Jazz & Blues Festival, the 2012 festival took place on the first weekend of March.

In separate action, a group of immigrants in Boquete came together in 2005 to form a performing theater group, which was named Boquete Community Players (BCP). BCP was formalized legally in 2007 as a Panamanian foundation and is operated as a not-for-profit organization. It became the first performance venue in the community in November 2009, when BCP held its grand opening of a refurbished restaurant and bar in the center of Boquete alongside the Caldera River. The mission of BCP is to sponsor, produce, and promote artistic events to enhance appreciation for and understanding of the arts, and to promote a cohesive sense of community. BCP produced its first Spanish language production in 2015.

An interesting "side activity" of the BCP was to institute a weekly market at the BCP facility in 2009. The weekly market activity was scheduled on Tuesday's, coincident with a weekly information and discussion session at the BCP theater. These joint market and information meetings have come to be known as the "Tuesday Morning Meetings" (TMM). Through time and with the demonstrated community interest, the Tuesday market has become a very significant community activity, at times causing conflict between the performance/theater functions and the market functions. For the most part, however, those issues have been successfully overcome. Visitors to Boquete are frequently advised to visit BCP on Tuesday mornings because it is such an integral part of the community. The Tuesday information meetings, and especially the Tuesday market activities have been a big success, not only commercially speaking, but more importantly in the integration of the locals and the expatriates working side by side.

Boquete also hosts an annual Coffee and Flower Fair, with attractions for those older and younger, and beautiful displays of colorful natural arrangements and scents. This is in March, usually.

== Climate ==
Climate data for Boquete (Los Naranjos) (2006–2014)
Month	Jan	Feb	Mar	Apr	May	Jun	Jul	Aug	Sep	Oct	Nov	Dec	Year
Mean daily maximum °C (°F)	24.5 (76.1)	25.1 (77.2)	25.4 (77.7)	26.1 (79.0)	25.8 (78.4)	25.7 (78.3)	25.4 (77.7)	25.7 (78.3)	25.6 (78.1)	24.5 (76.1)	24.4 (75.9)	24.4 (75.9)	25.2 (77.4)
Daily mean °C (°F)	20.2 (68.4)	20.4 (68.7)	20.6 (69.1)	21.2 (70.2)	21.2 (70.2)	21.2 (70.2)	21.2 (70.2)	21.1 (70.0)	20.8 (69.4)	20.3 (68.5)	20.4 (68.7)	20.2 (68.4)	20.7 (69.3)
Mean daily minimum °C (°F)	15.9 (60.6)	15.6 (60.1)	15.9 (60.6)	16.2 (61.2)	16.6 (61.9)	16.8 (62.2)	17.0 (62.6)	16.6 (61.9)	16.1 (61.0)	16.2 (61.2)	16.4 (61.5)	16.1 (61.0)	16.3 (61.3)
Average rainfall mm (inches)	52.3 (2.06)	26.6 (1.05)	36.7 (1.44)	76.1 (3.00)	284.2 (11.19)	317.2 (12.49)	224.5 (8.84)	293.8 (11.57)	397.4 (15.65)	411.7 (16.21)	219.8 (8.65)	101.3 (3.99)	2,441.6 (96.14)
Source 1: INEC
Source 2: IMHPA (rainfall)

== Nature ==
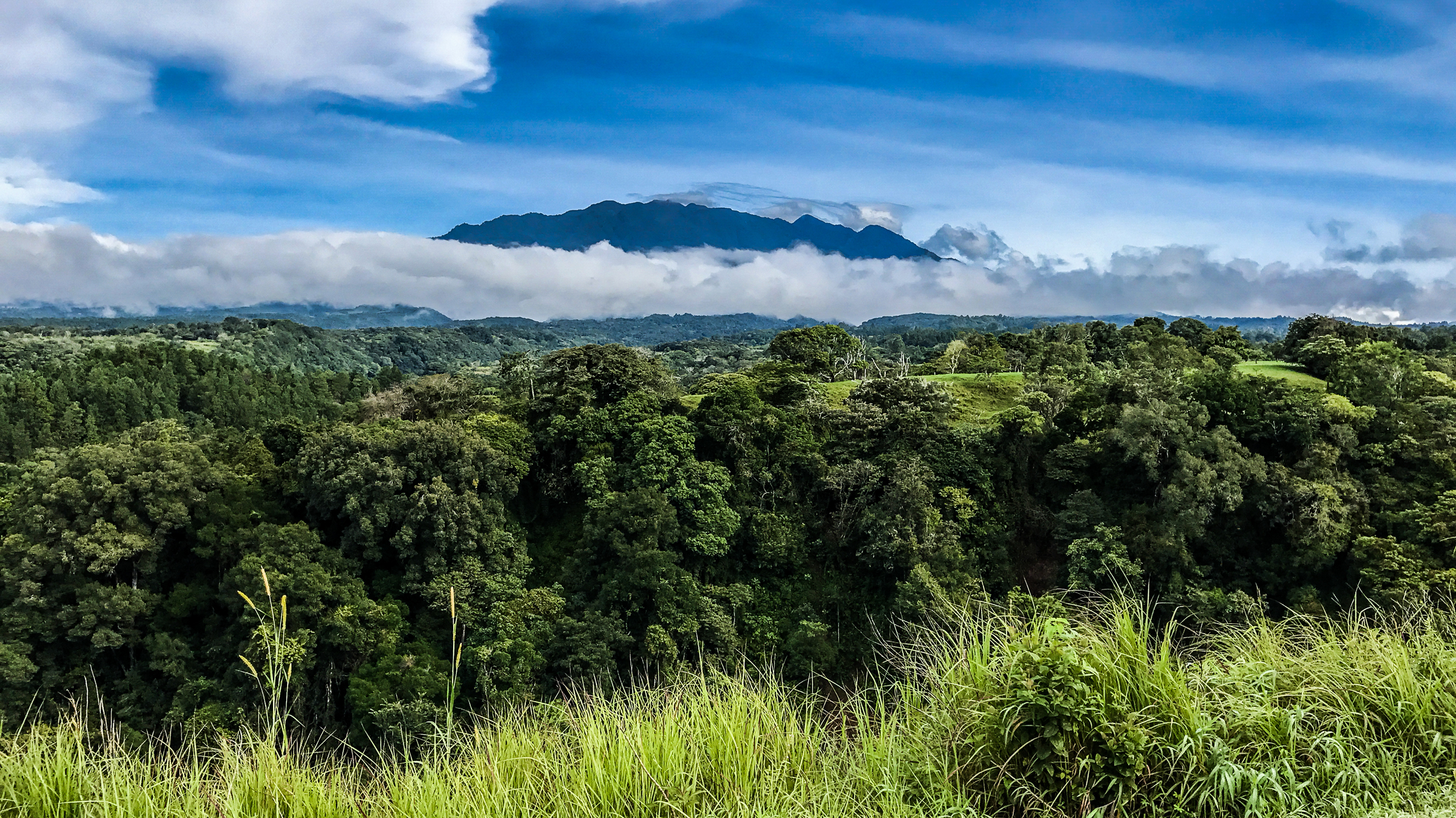
Rainy season in Panama produces remarkable landscapes and skies

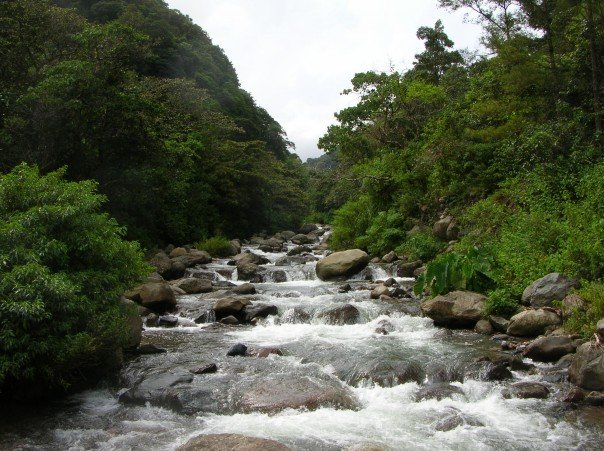
View of the Rio Caldera from a homemade bridge near Volcan Baru National Park, Boquete

Some of its landmarks include nearby Volcán Barú, an inactive volcano and, at 3,475 meters (11,400 feet), the tallest point of land in Panama and with the help of a guide you can reach the highest point of the volcano. Hikers enjoy a relatively easy hike up and over the volcano, along the Sendero de los Quetzales, which runs from Boquete up to Cerro Punta and Volcan, on the other side of the volcano.

The Caldera River runs through the town. It is a river that has shaped much of its form.

The squirrel species Microsciurus boquetensis is named after this town, as the first specimen of the species was collected from Boquete.

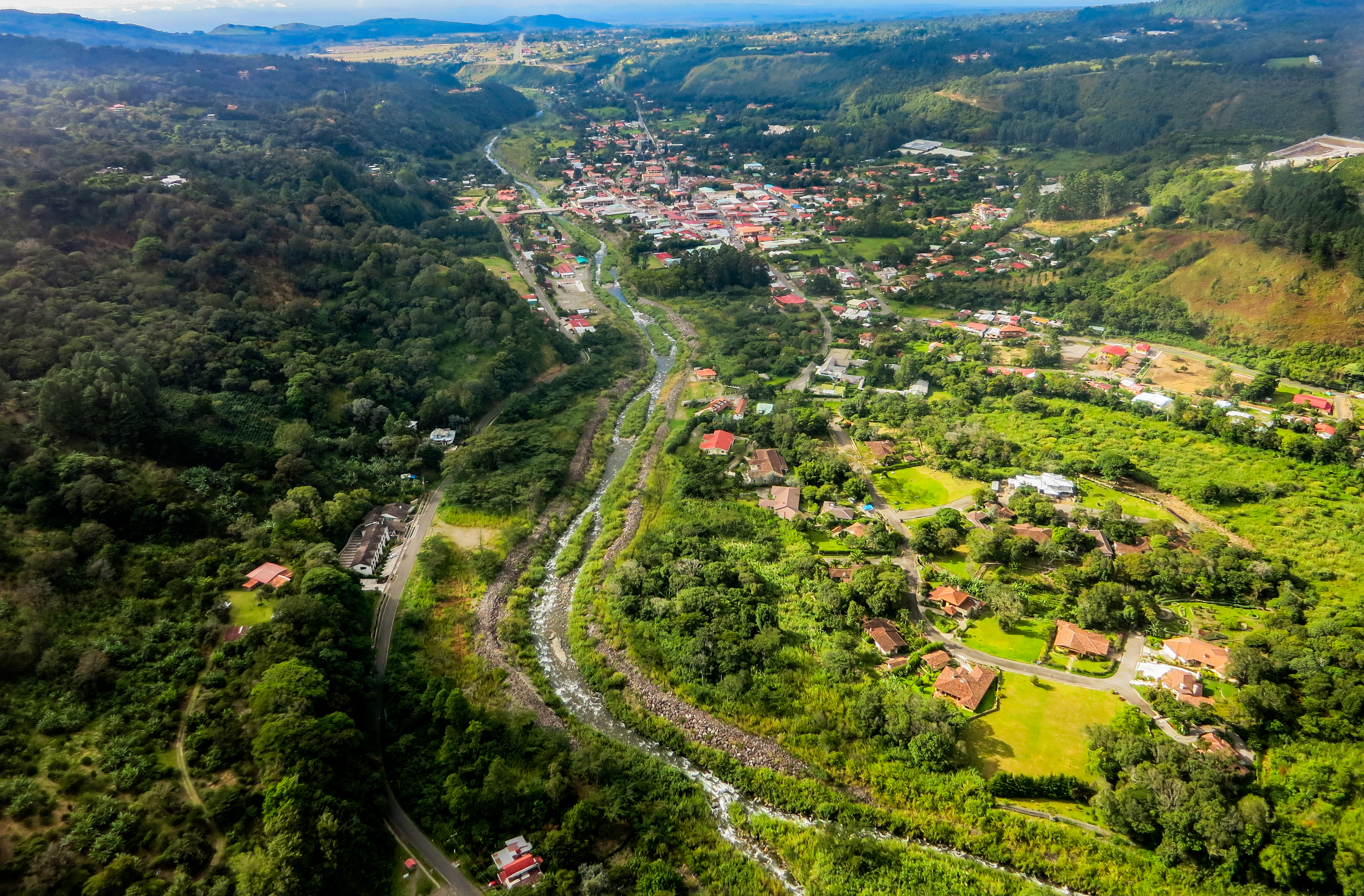
View to the South of the town of Boquete, Panama

== Demographics ==
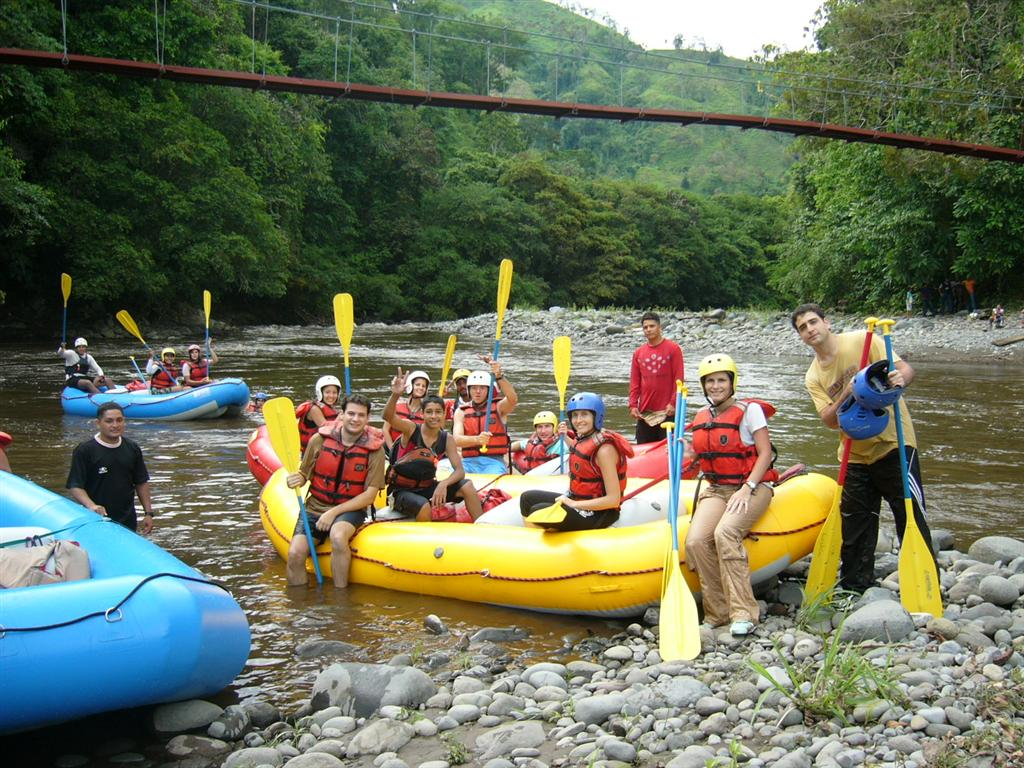
Tourism in Boquete

The district of Boquete has approximately 23.562 inhabitants. In recent decades, Boquete has become home to many North American and European immigrants, primarily retirees. Some 14% of its population are of foreign origin, according to La Prensa, a national newspaper. Immigrants are attracted by the temperate climate, Panama's relatively low cost of living and tax exemptions.

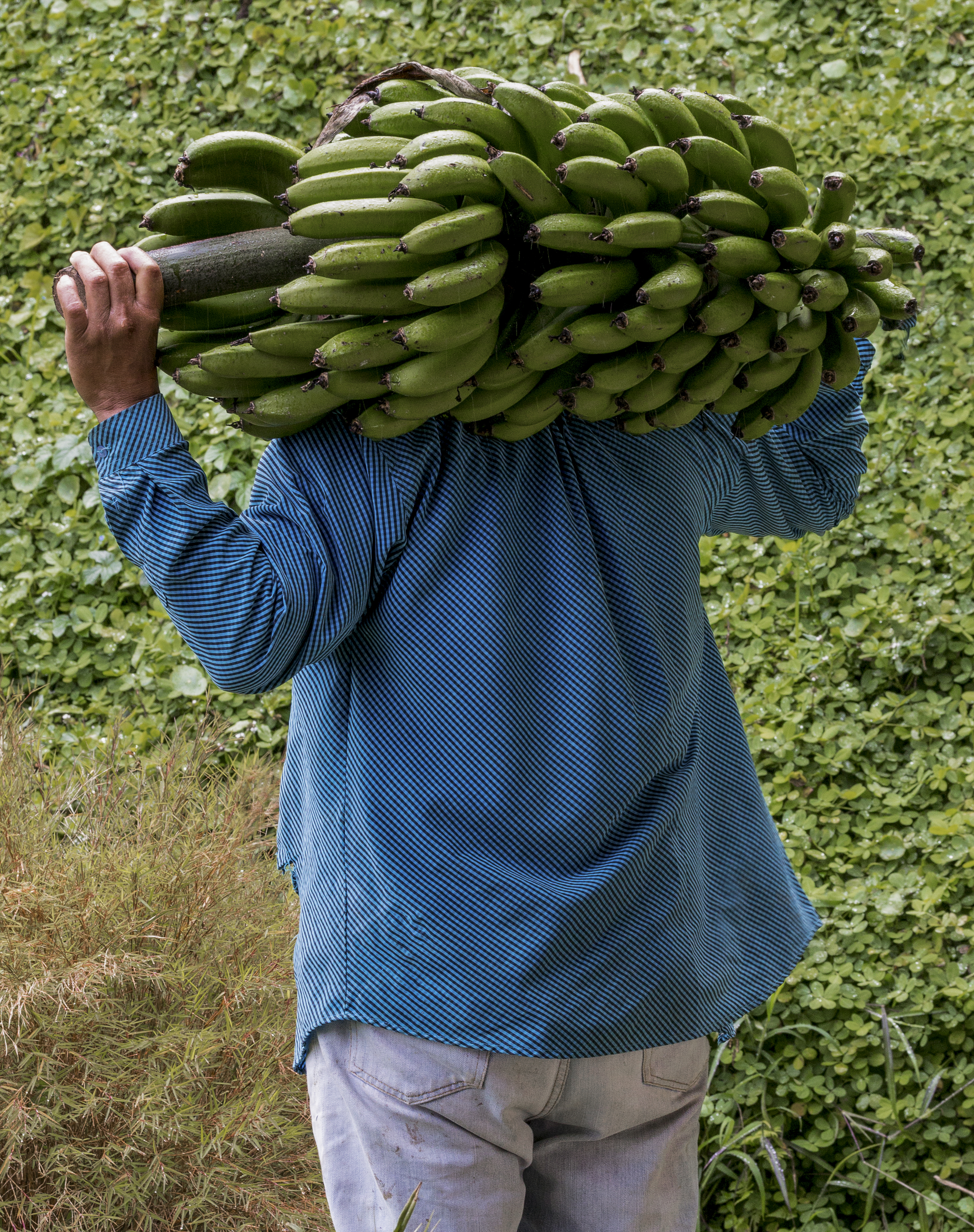
A man walks along with freshly cut banana stalk

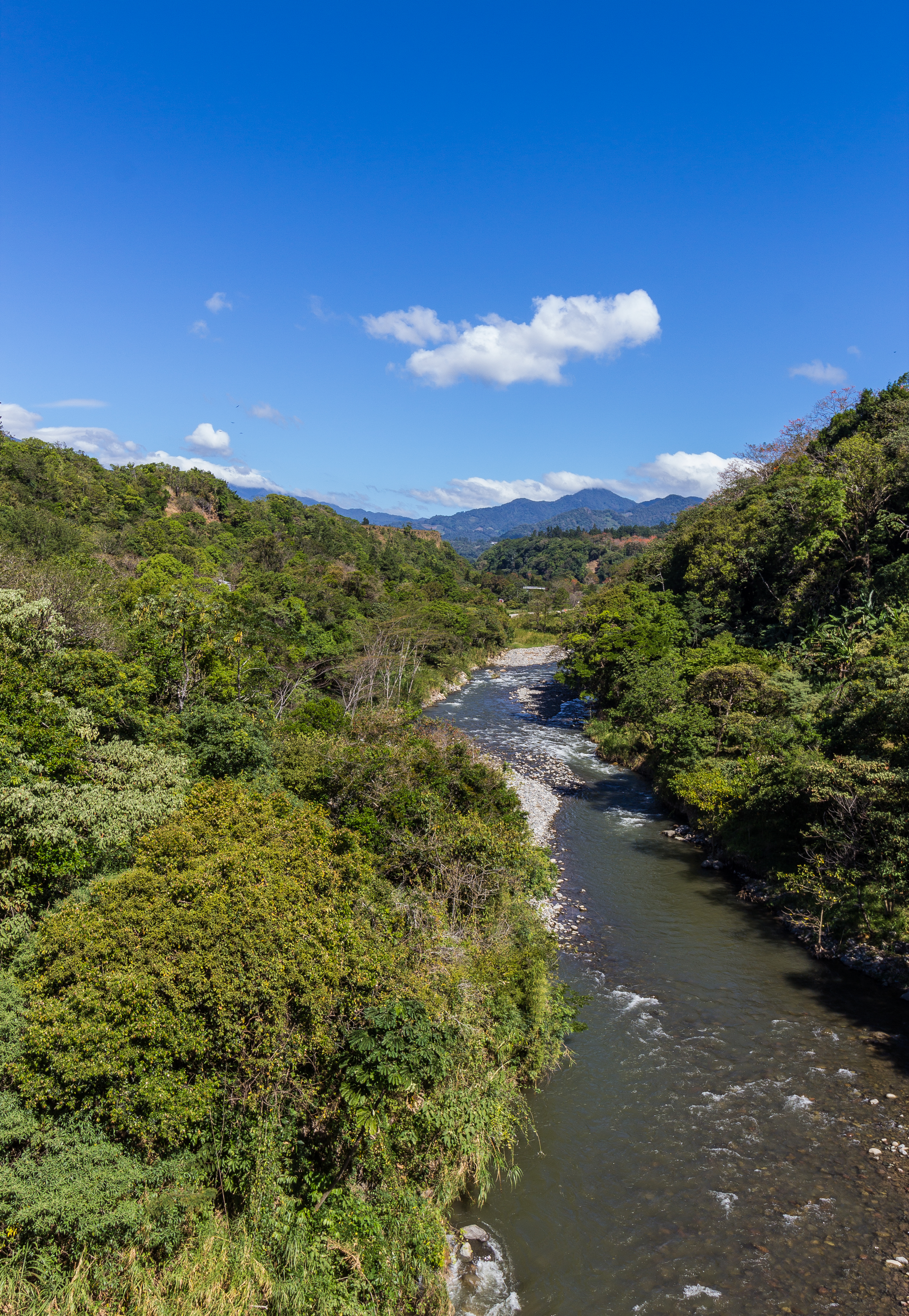
View of the Caldera River as it runs South of Boquete, Panama

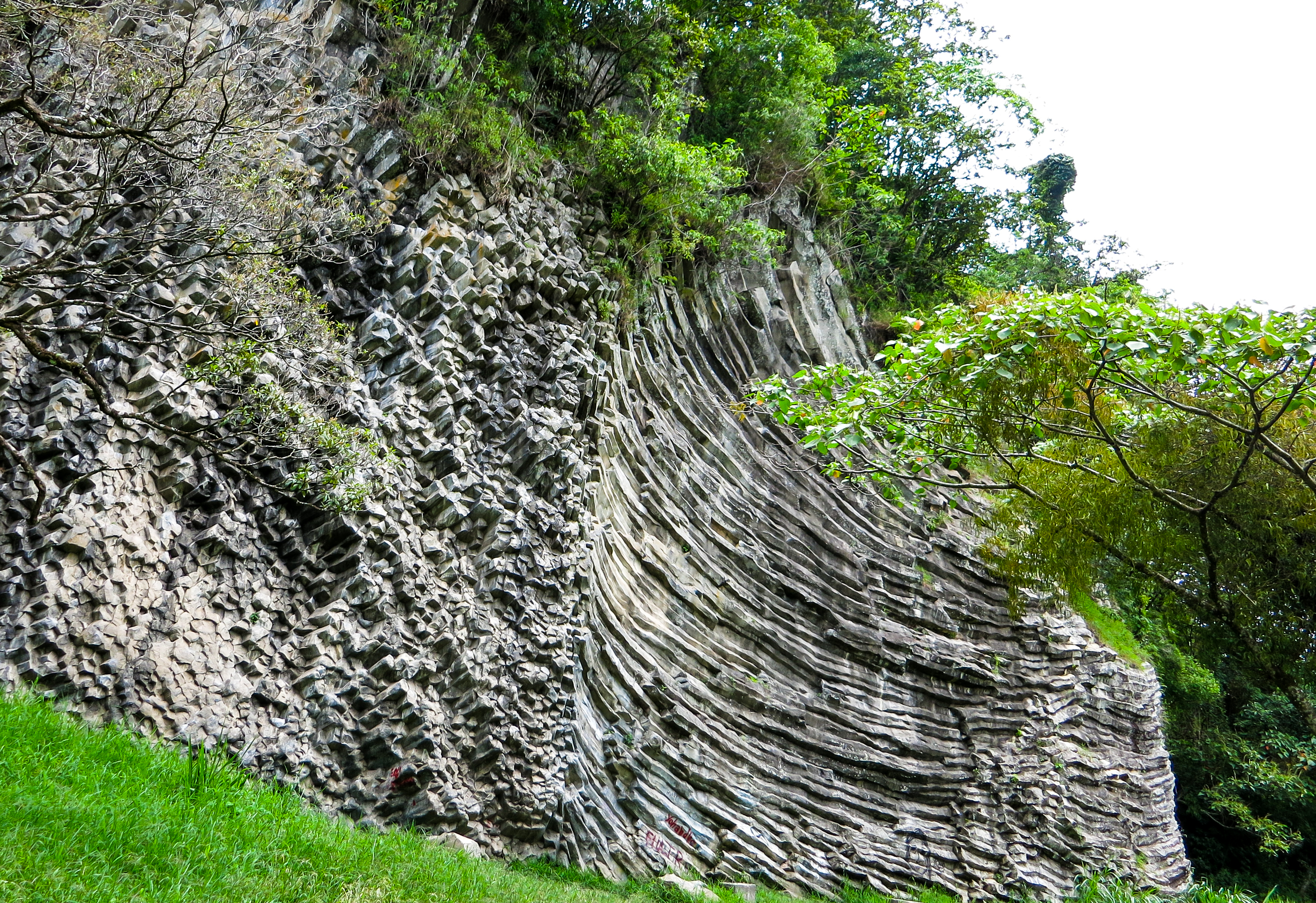
A cliff of rocks is a popular climbing opportunity

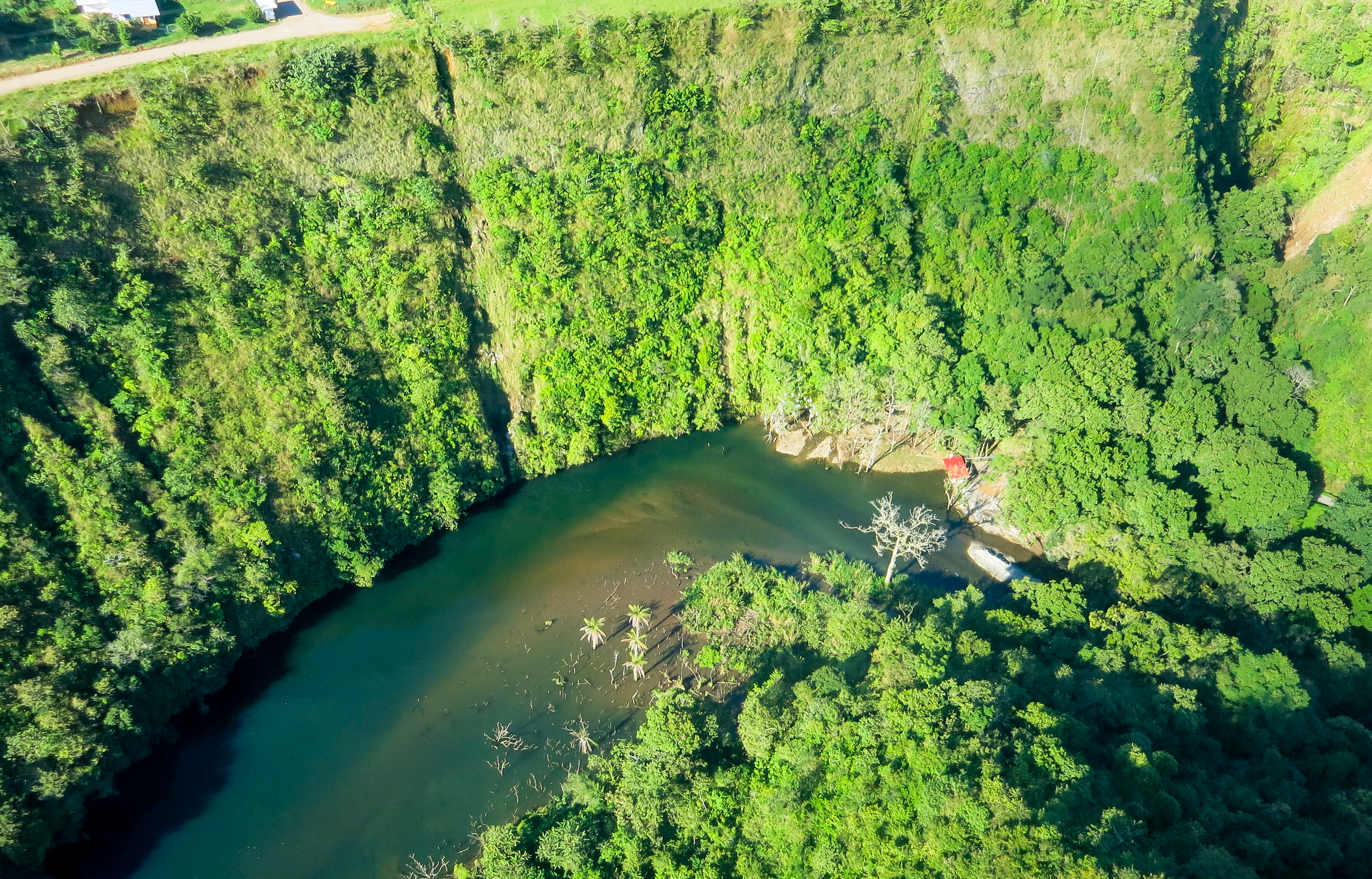
Aerial view of a river in Chiriqui Province, Panama

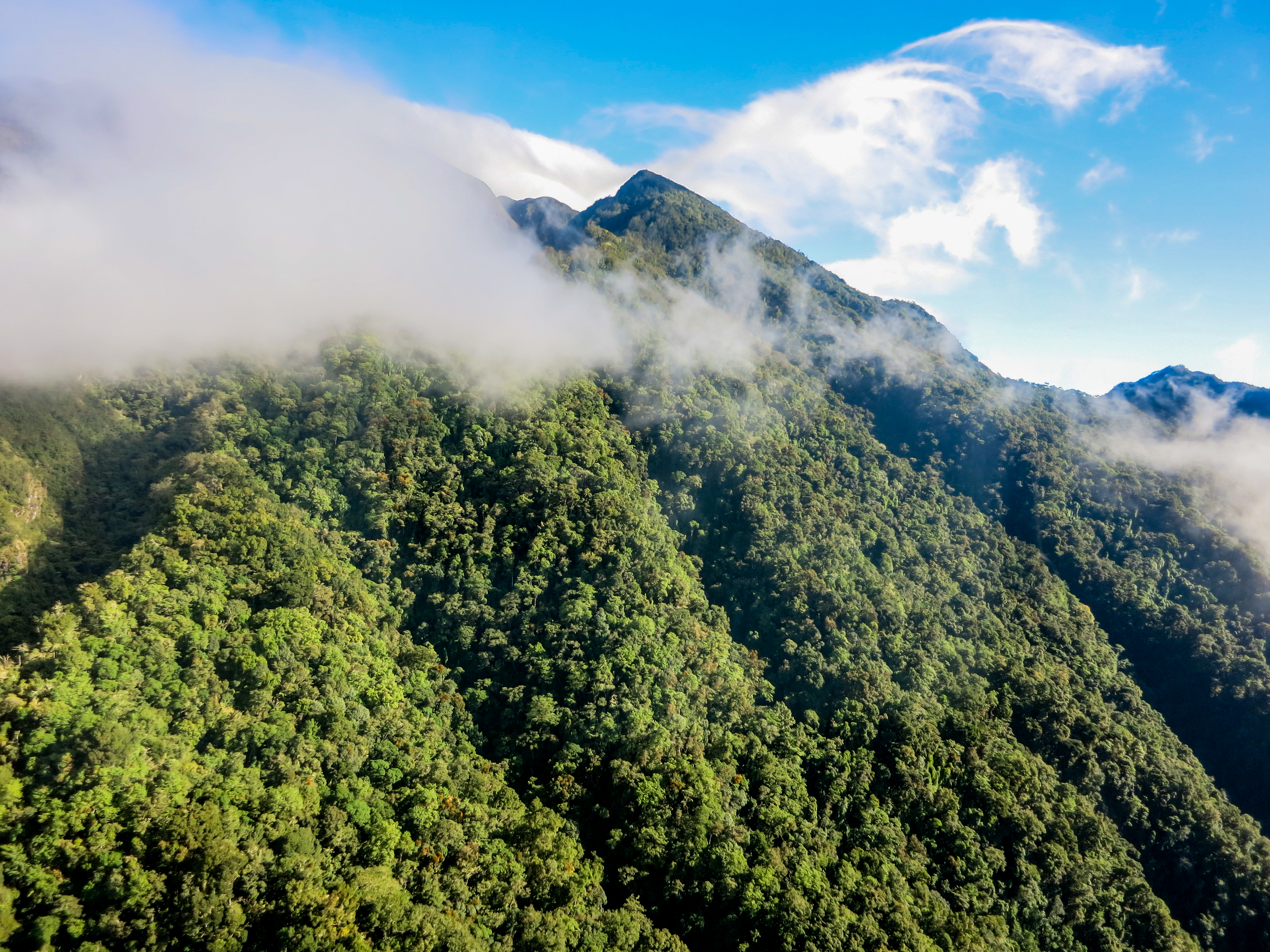
View up close of Volcan Baru, Boquete, Panama

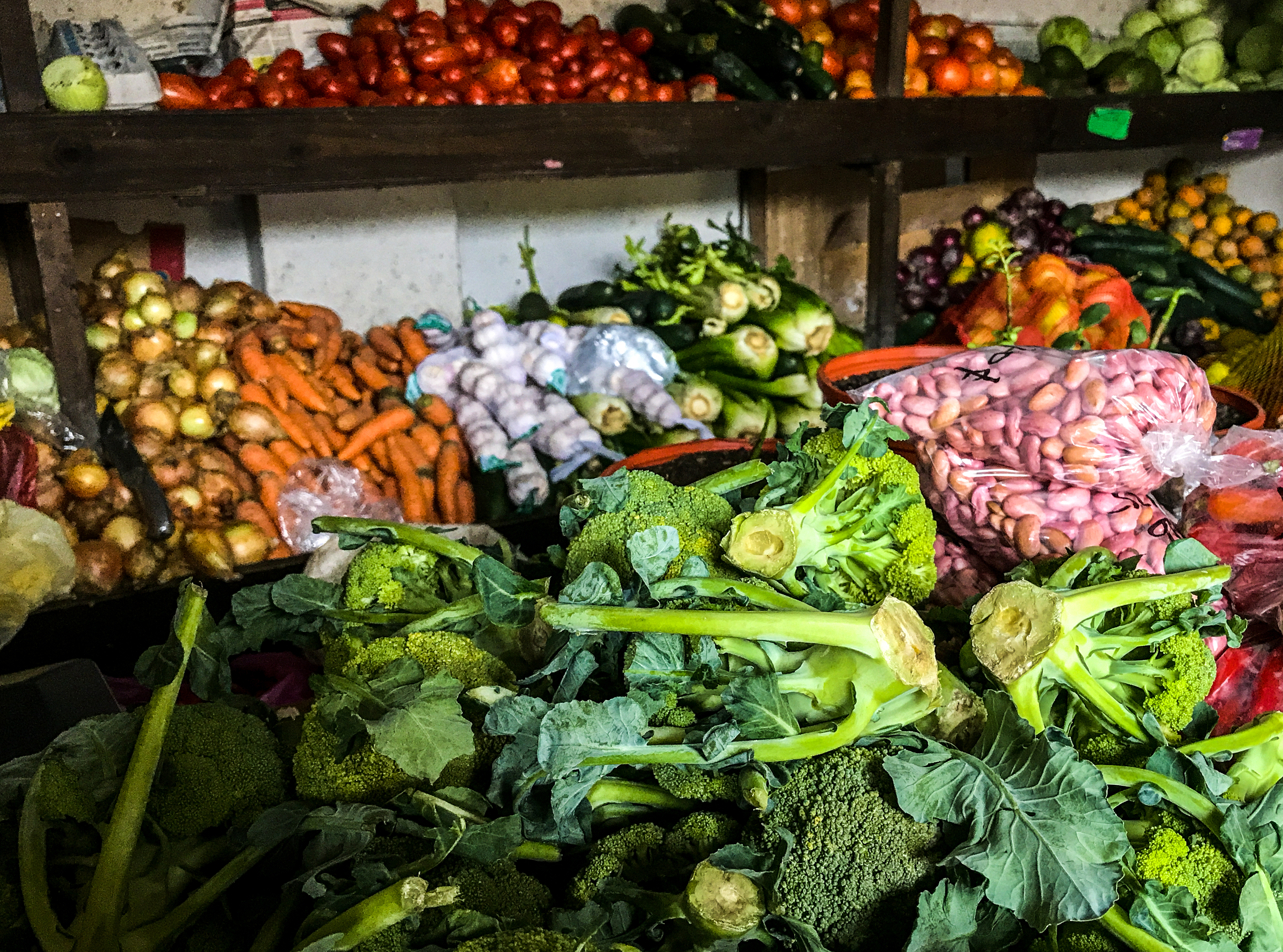
Locally grown, organic vegetables at the Market in Boquete, Panama

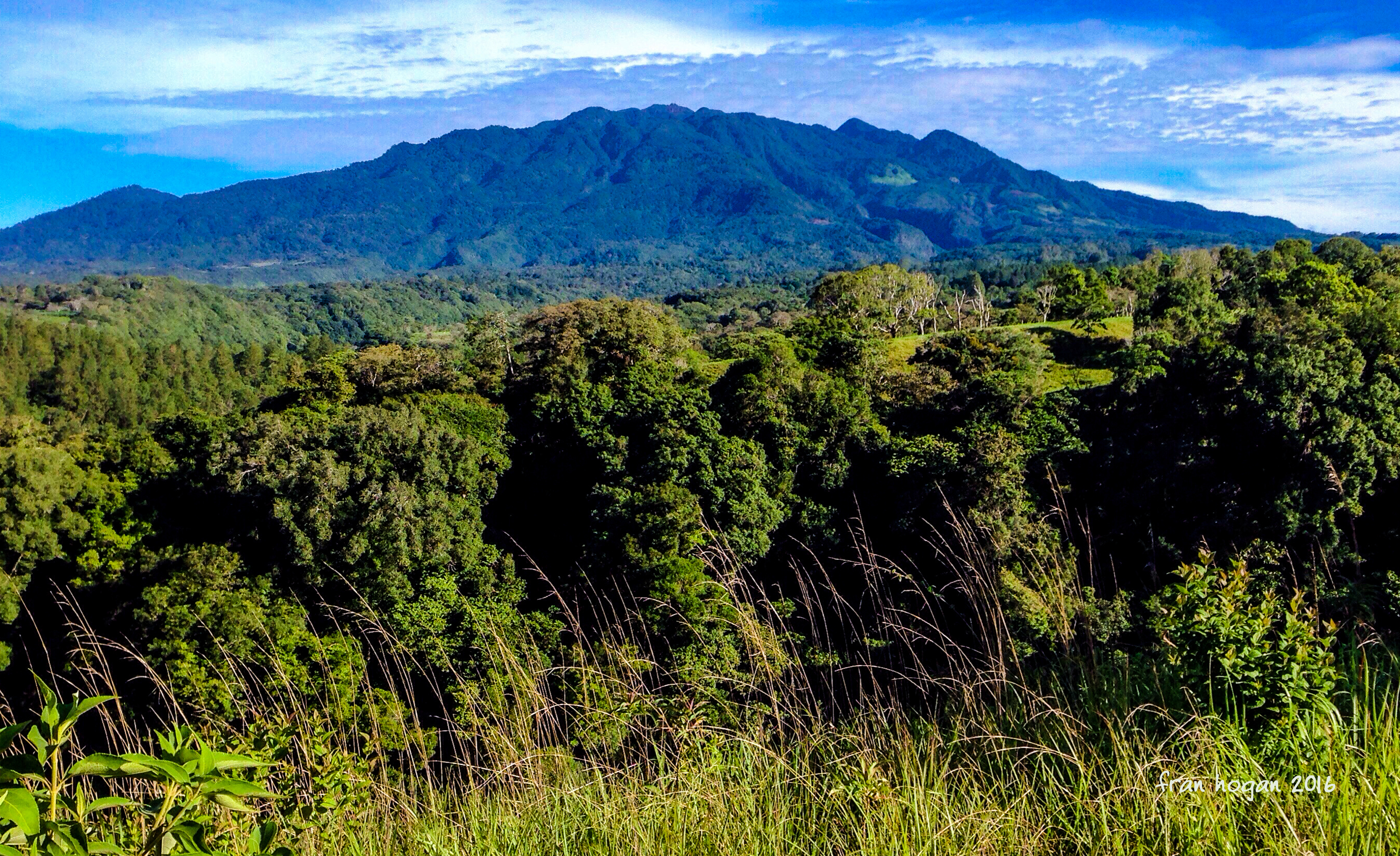
Baru volcano, Panama's tallest mountain

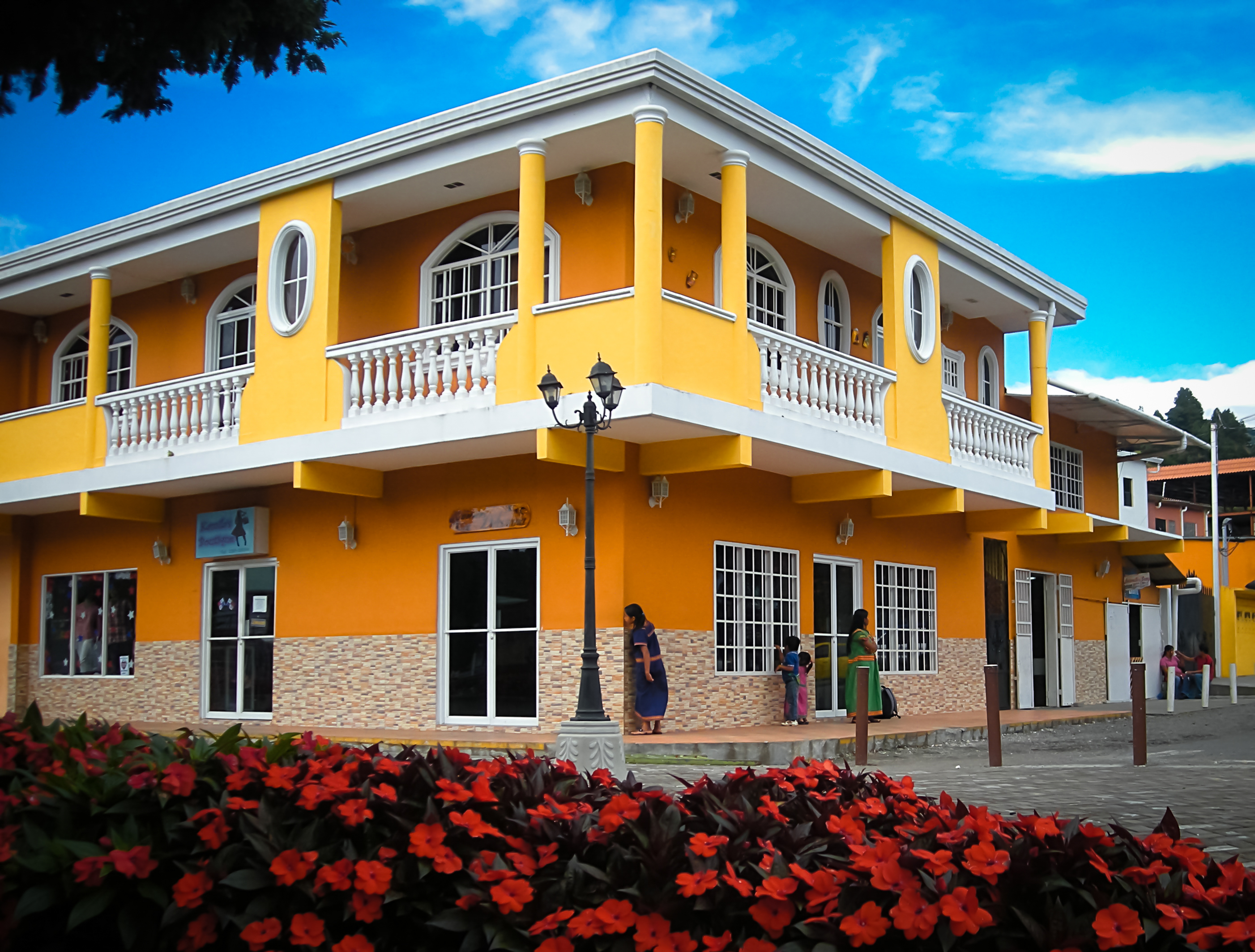
Building on the Square in Boquete, Panama

== Immigrant community ==
There is a large community of immigrants in Boquete. According to La Contraloria General de la Nacion, the government institution in charge of the census, there are over 3,000 foreigners permanently living in Boquete, from over 30 different countries. Although Americans and Canadians comprise the majority, there is also a large group of immigrants from Colombia and Venezuela, and the third-largest group of immigrants is from the European countries. This increase in immigrants has stimulated the growth of new industries and business, owned both by locals and foreigners. The most relevant industry is the hotel industry; there are currently over 50 accommodations in Boquete, ranging from 5 star resorts to backpacker's motels. Along with hotels, many new restaurants have opened in Boquete.

== Disappearance of Kris Kremers and Lisanne Froon ==
Kris Kremers and Lisanne Froon were Dutch students who disappeared on 1 April 2014, while hiking in the vicinity of Boquete. After an extensive search, portions of their bodies were found a few months later. Their cause of death could not be determined definitively, but Dutch authorities working with forensic and search-rescue investigators thought it likely the students had accidentally fallen from a cliff after becoming lost. The circumstances and aftermath of their disappearance have resulted in much speculation about the cause of death, including the death of Leonardo Arturo Gonzalez Mastinu, the taxi driver who brought Kris and Lisanne to the Pianista trail on the morning of 1 April. Foul play could not be entirely ruled out and Panamanian officials came under fire for allegedly mishandling the disappearance and aftermath.

== Photographs of Boquete and surrounding area ==
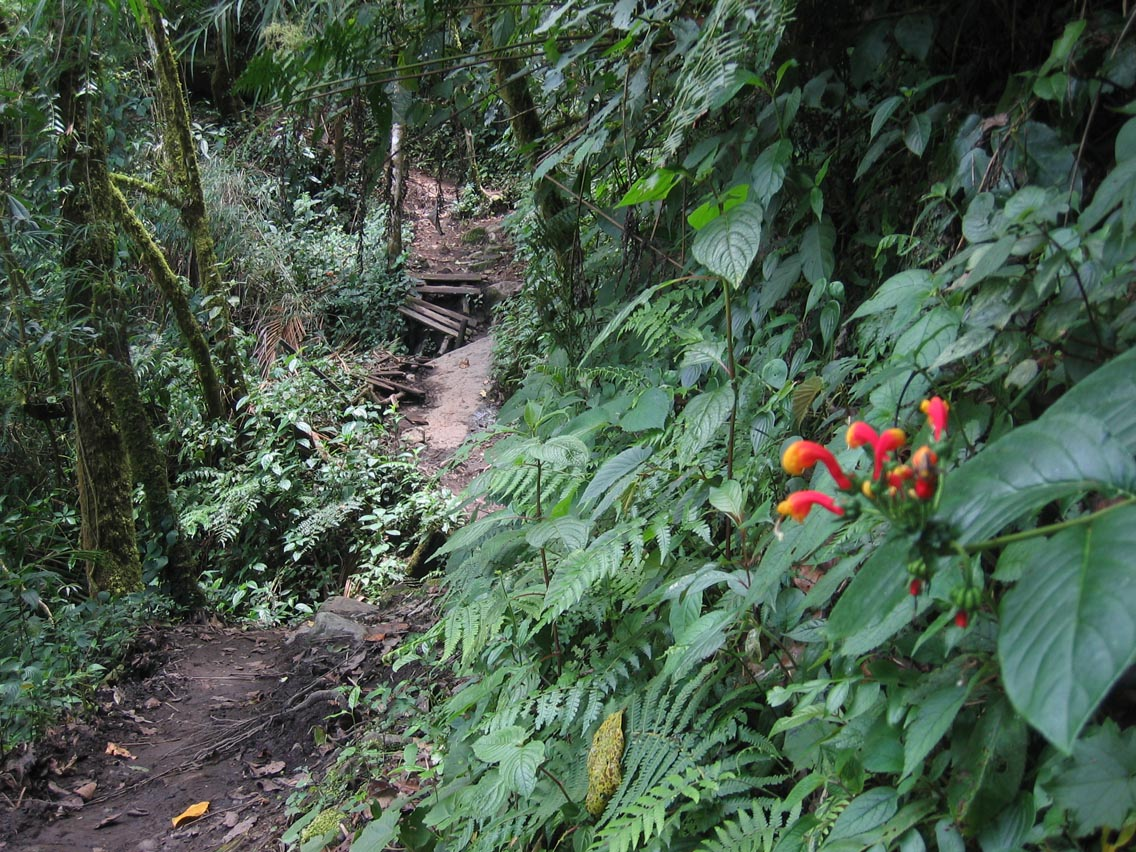
Part of the Sendero de los Quetzales - most parts are in a better state

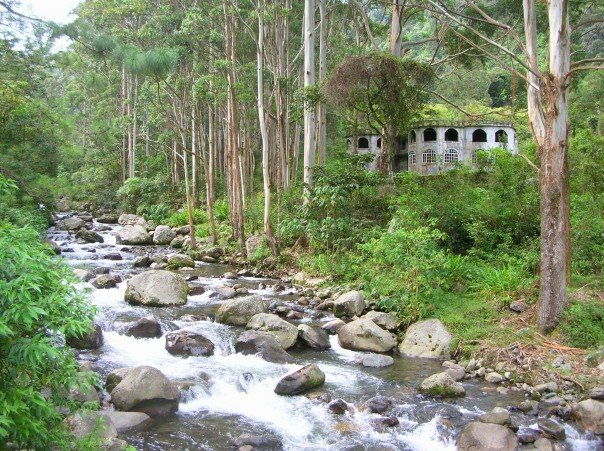
Castle-style house, long under construction along the Caldera River

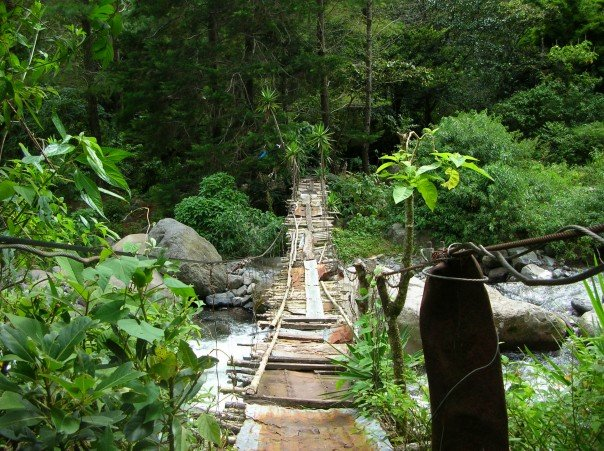
A homemade bridge, near Volcan Baru National Park in Boquete, leading to a private residence

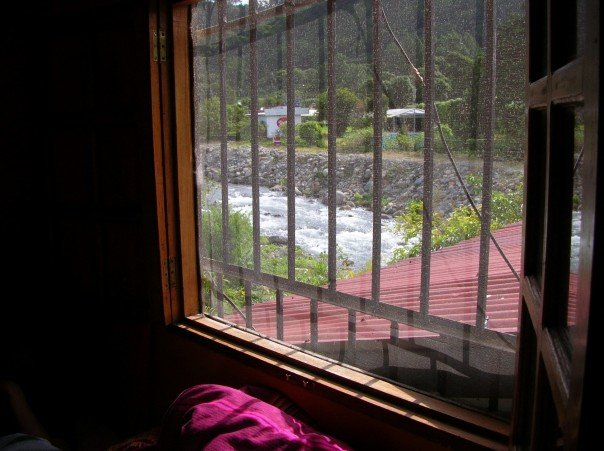
View from a room in the Hostel Boquete, overlooking the Rio Caldera

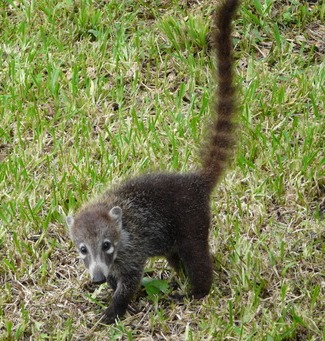
White-nosed Coati, Wildlife Rescue Center, Boquete, Panama
