= Alto Boquete =

- Corregimiento
- Interactive map of Alto Boquete
- Location within Panama
- Coordinates: 8°48′N 82°24′W
- Country: Panama
- Province: Chiriquí
- District: Boquete
- Established: July 29, 1998

Area
  - Land: 89.4 km^{2} (34.5 sq mi)

Population (2010)
  - Total: 6,290
  - Density: 70.4/km^{2} (182/sq mi)
- Population density calculated based on land area.
- Time zone: UTC−5 (EST)

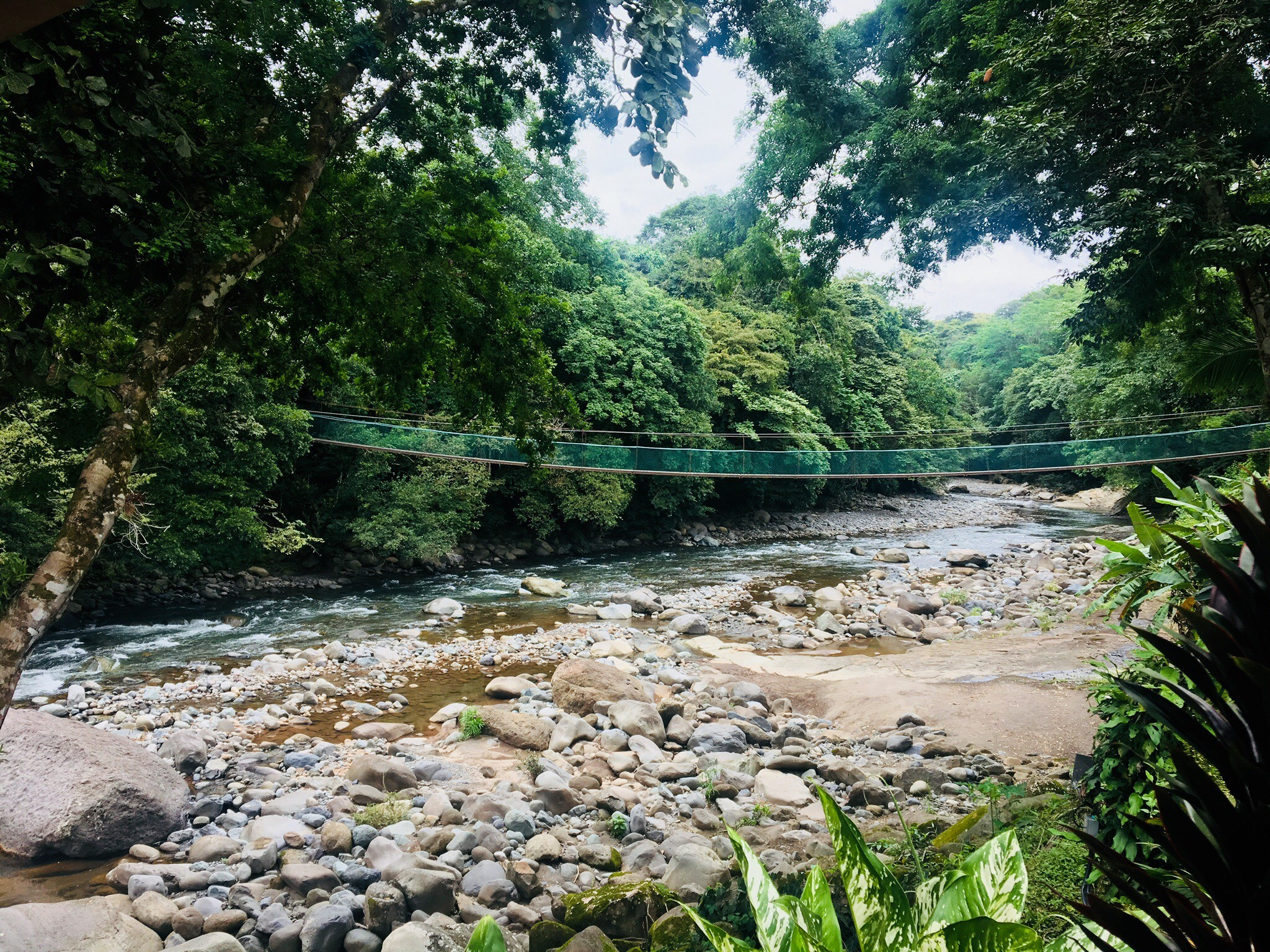
Alto Boquete, Chiriquí, Panama

Alto Boquete is a corregimiento in Boquete District, Chiriquí Province, Panama. It has a land area of 89.4 square kilometres (34.5 sq mi) and had a population of 6,290 as of 2010, giving it a population density of 70.4 inhabitants per square kilometre (182/sq mi). It was created by Law 58 of July 29, 1998, owing to the Declaration of Unconstitutionality of Law 1 of 1982. Its population as of 2000 was 3,891.
