= Domenico Caldara =

Italian painter (1814–1897)

Domenico Caldara (1814–1897) was an Italian painter, mainly of portraits and genre painting.

== Biography ==
He was born in Foggia in Apulia, into a humble family, but was sponsored by a local aristocrat, Count Varo, to study at the Royal Academy of Fine Arts in Naples. He was commissioned to paint the ceiling of the main hall of the Casa Siniscalchi in Naples with frescoes depicting Apollo with the muses on Parnassus. In 1854, he was named a professor at the Academy in Naples. He painted for the royal family, including a Vision of Christ by St Theresa and a Glory of St Vincent Ferreri. In 1859, Queen Maria Theresa commissioned from Caldara a life-size death portrait of the King Ferdinand at the Royal Palace of Caserta. With the fall of the Bourbon dynasty, Caldara lost his government sponsorship. In 1877, he exhibited a painting titled Vecchierella at the Esposizione Nazionale di Venezia del 1887. He died in poverty in Naples.
