= Barriles =

Archaeological site in Panama

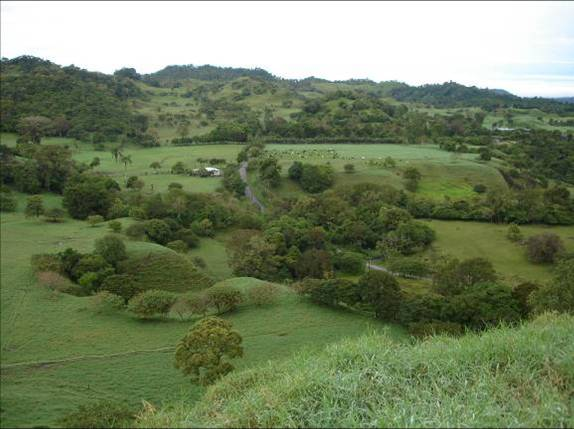
- Sitio Barriles

- Location of the site in Panama
- 8°48′N 82°42′W
- Type: Settlement
- Location: Chiriquí Province, Panama

Barriles (known also as Sitio Barriles or by the designation BU-24) is one of the most famous archaeological sites in Panama. It is located in the highlands of the Chiriquí Province of Western Panama at 1,200 meters (3,900 ft) above sea level. It is several kilometers west of the modern town of Volcán. This places the site in the Gran Chiriquí culture area (encompassing Western Panama and much of Southern Costa Rica, parts of the even broader Intermediate Area or Isthmo-Colombian Area). The site was originally named for several small stone barrels found in the area, although these have also been found elsewhere in the Río Chiriquí Viejo valley and in Costa Rica. This area has a cool, spring-like climate with a pronounced rainy season between May and November, and a dry but windy season the rest of the year. The region lies on the western flanks of Volcán Barú, a dormant volcano and the highest mountain in Panama.

Like El Caño in Central Panama or Panamá Viejo in Panama City, Barriles is one of the few archaeological sites in Panama regularly accessible to the public. The northwestern portion of the site is accessible to the public through the Landau finca (which is a private property), who have a variety of artifacts on display in their yard, in the walls of a fake excavation block, and in a small private museum. Not all of the artifacts on display were found on-site. The family offers guided tours of the collections and their gardens in both Spanish and English.

The site is believed to have once been a socioceremonial center with a substantial residential population between 500-1000 individuals. It contains a small mound which was once associated with a row of 14 statues. Ten of these depicted solitary individuals, while four included one individual- often chubbier, taller, wearing a conical hat and ornaments- riding atop the shoulders of a naked man, though some of these individuals also wore conical hats. Many scholars have interpreted these double individual statues as evidence for the existence of higher and lower status social groups within Barriles. A large metate (grinding stone) whose border was adorned by tiny stone heads has also been interpreted as evidence for violence or human sacrifice in the past. Many of the statues and the metate are on currently display in the Museo Antropológico Reina Torres de Araúz in Panama City.

== Chronology ==
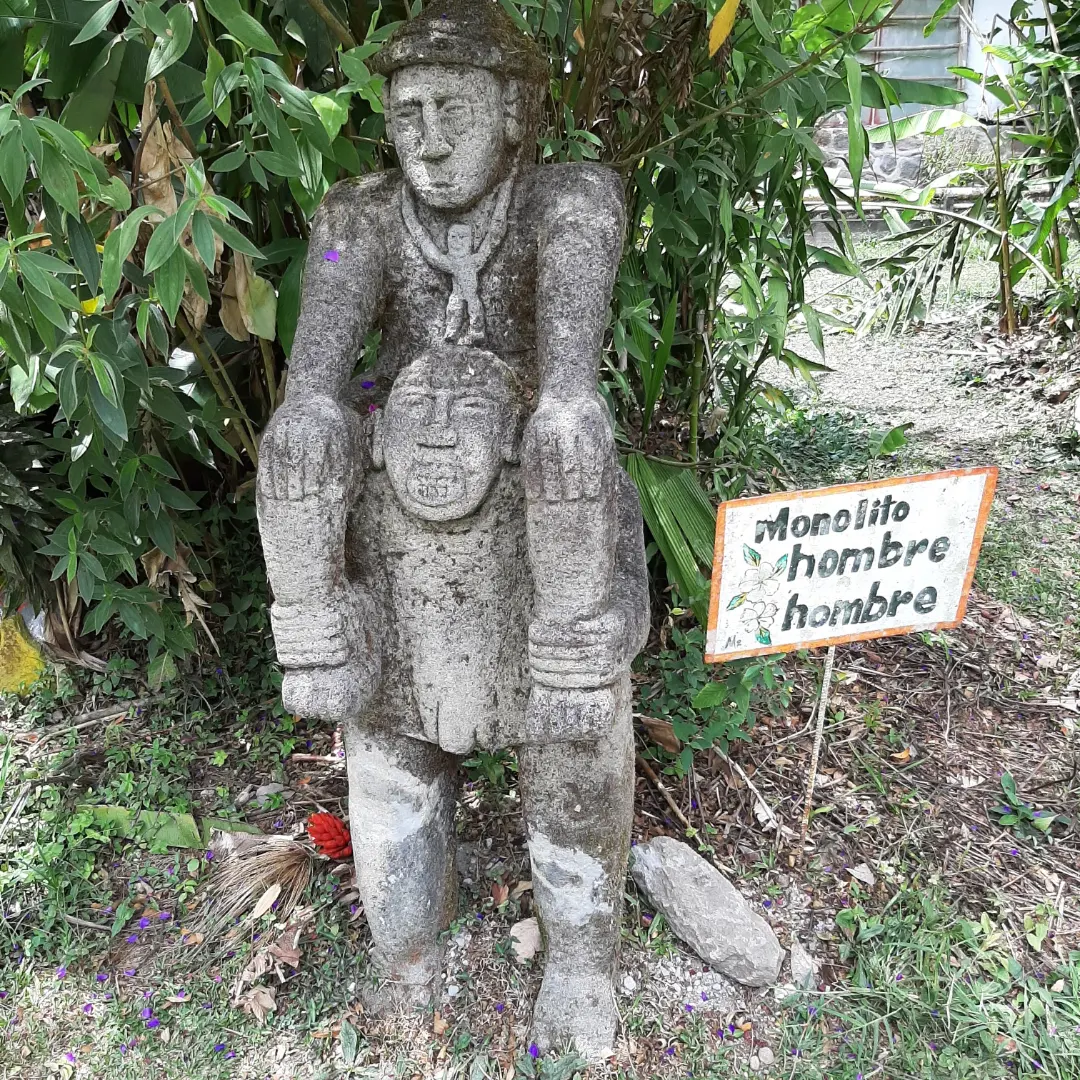
A replica of one of the statues found around Sitio Barriles

Barriles was largely occupied during the Aguas Buenas period (A.D. 300-900) (see), known locally as the Bugaba period. Nine radiocarbon dates have been taken from Barriles, six of them clustering between A.D. 500-800 (or the Late Bugaba phase). Pottery from this period was generally unpainted and occasionally included engraved, incised and appliqué decorations. Stone artifacts, including small chips created from the manufacture of stone tools (i.e. blades, axes, and metates), were generally made from andesite, basalt, rhyolite, and chert. Organic materials, like plant fibers and animal bones, have not preserved well in the acidic soils.

The Aguas Buenas period was preceded by the Tropical Forest Archaic (4600-2300 B.C.), which is known from rockshelter sites found outside of the valley. The Concepción Phase (roughly 300 BC to AD 400) was associated with the earliest ceramic using populations in the area, and evidence suggests that populations were low and spatially dispersed, though more sites are known from lower elevations. The Aguas Buenas period was associated with the development of settlement system containing large villages and small farmsteads. The subsequent Chiriquí Phases (AD 900-1500) witnessed the dissolution of the previous villages, and populations returned to ephemeral and spatially dispersed patterns. This suggests that major population reorganization during the sequence may have been associated with the political and ceremonial rise and decline of Barriles.

A hypothetical AD 600 eruption of nearby Volcán Baru was thought to have devastated other archaeological settlements upstream from Barriles, prompting a movement into, and subsequent colonization of, the Caribbean watershed. Recent geological and archaeological work has seriously questioned the veracity of the AD 600 eruption, and evidence now points toward a much later eruption event, possibly around AD 1400. Recent archaeological work in the Caribbean watershed has also raised the possibility of earlier and denser populations than previously believed.

== History of research ==
Barriles was the subject of early archaeological investigations by Dr. Matthew Stirling (the late 1940s), who did not publish extensively on his findings. Stirling was the archaeologist who recovered fragments of the Barriles statues and the large metate. Alain Ichon and Wolfgang Haberland (1950s and 1960s) were interested in studying the ceramics from Barriles, and collected samples from a few small excavations.

In the early 1970s, in the region (and other areas in Western Panama) became the focus of the multi-year Adaptive Radiations project led by the Panamanian archaeologist Dr. Olga Linares. The project involved several influential figures in modern Central American archaeology, including Dr. Richard Cooke, Dr. Anthony Ranere, and Dr. Payson Sheets. This project surveyed a portion of the Río Chiriquí Viejo valley and identified dozens of sites. They concluded that the Río Chiriquí Viejo was once home to substantial and complex populations supported by maize agriculture. According to them, this was not as easily possible in the neighboring Caribbean lowlands, which did not exhibit the same complex social organization as the mountains. The accuracy and implications of last point has become the subject of considerable debate. Some collections of ceramics and lithics from this project are housed in Temple University. The site was then briefly revisited by Dr. Catherine Shelton in the 1980s, but the majority of her work dealt with sites at lower elevations. The Argentinian scholar Dr. Vidal Fraitts studied the Barriles statues during the 1990s, but did not conduct new fieldwork at the site.

The first decade of the 21st century has witnessed renewed interest in the site. A German-Panamanian team of archaeologists excavated the remains of a structure in 2001, which suggested to them that Barriles was probably a village rather than an empty ceremonial center or cemetery. This large excavation block has been left open for tourists to visit today. Dr. Karen Holmberg (Brown University) sampled volcanic strata from this excavation, though much of her work was ultimately conducted near the modern towns of Boquete and Caldera on the other side of the volcano. Dr. Scott Palumbo (College of Lake County) recently conducted the most extensive work at the site by sampling different domestic sectors with hundreds of small excavations. His work suggested that Barriles contained a far denser residential population compared to other sites in the region, and that the activities which drew people to the village were likely ceremonial feasts, perhaps associated with funerary rituals. Differences between social ranks, however, was subtle and not nearly as clear as the distinctions supposedly advertised in the double individual statues.

== Myths and misconceptions ==
Because Barriles has received relatively little archaeological attention compared to flashier sites in Mesoamerica or Peru, it has become the subject of considerable rumor and speculation.

One of the more popular rumors is that Barriles was settled by two populations, one of African descent and another of Asian descent (not completely unlike modern Panama). Proponents of this theory point to the supposed ethnic characteristics they claim to see on the Barriles statues. There are three reasons to doubt this possibility. The first is the ceramic styles and patterns of domestic organization studied at Barriles have identifiable and direct antecedents in the previous Concepción Phase, rather than representing an intrusive complex of artifacts introduced from elsewhere. The second reason to doubt this theory is that the statues themselves appear quite stylized, suggesting that certain physical features (like perfectly squared shoulders) may have been part of the ancient artistic canon of the sculptors, rather than an accurate copy of actual physical characteristics. The final reason is that some of the statues' faces have been interpreted as reflecting possibly mutilated individuals.

Pointing to poorly demonstrated trans-oceanic contacts is an example of a hyper-diffusionist theory. Such theories often do not give proper credit to descendant indigenous groups for their ancient cultural achievements, a practice which may be interpreted as implicitly racist and colonial.

Another common myth is that the Barriles population was conquered by Mayan groups from Mesoamerica (Mexico, Belize, Guatemala, parts of Honduras and El Salvador). Part of this theory is based on the presence of painted, polychrome ceramics from the end of the sequence. These exact ceramics are commonly associated with the later Chiriquí (or Boruca) period and have been extensively described by neighboring Costa Rican archaeologists. There is no evidence for Mayan contact or occupation that has been accepted by professional archaeologists.

== Anthropological significance ==
According to some, Barriles is believed to have been the seat of a small regional polity of settlements linked by ceremonial ties, warfare, and the production or exchange of polished stone axes, used for forest clearing and woodworking activities. The possible connection of political or religious organization to different degrees or forms of social inequality has been the subject of a recent investigation.

Changes in social organization, especially those associated with the early development and persistence of political hierarchies or social inequalities, are of theoretical interest to many anthropological archaeologists who seek to understand these important shifts in human history.

Barriles plays an important role in discussions of a Macro-Chibchan identity, based on genetic, linguistic and archaeological studies from elsewhere in Central America. The individuals wearing conical hats in the statues may be possibly associated with a shamanistic religious tradition.

However, studies of Macro-Chibchan identity have been largely based on qualities between trade items which are hypothesized to have bound different Chibchan-speaking groups into a similar religious tradition, items which are entirely absent at Barriles.

== Gallery ==
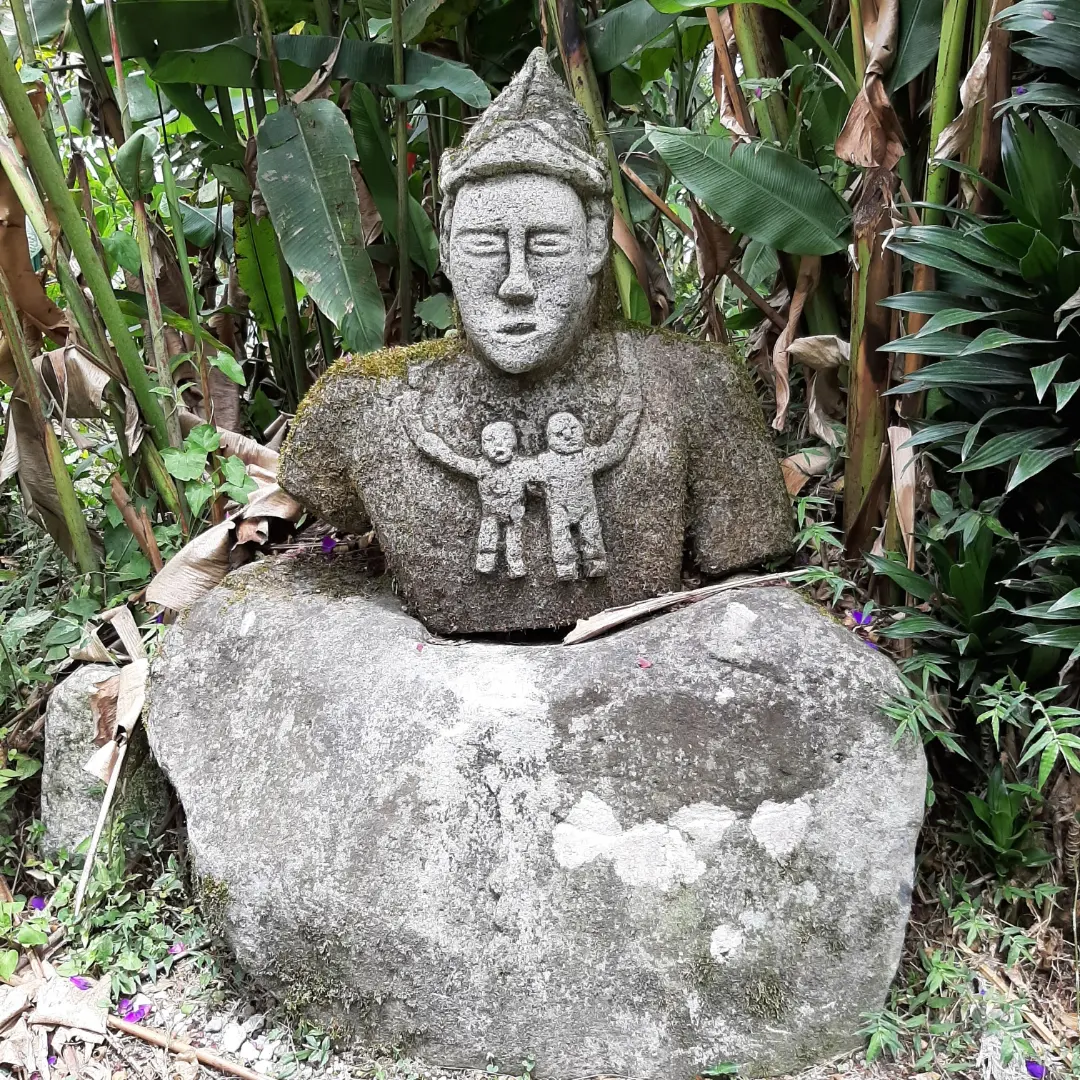

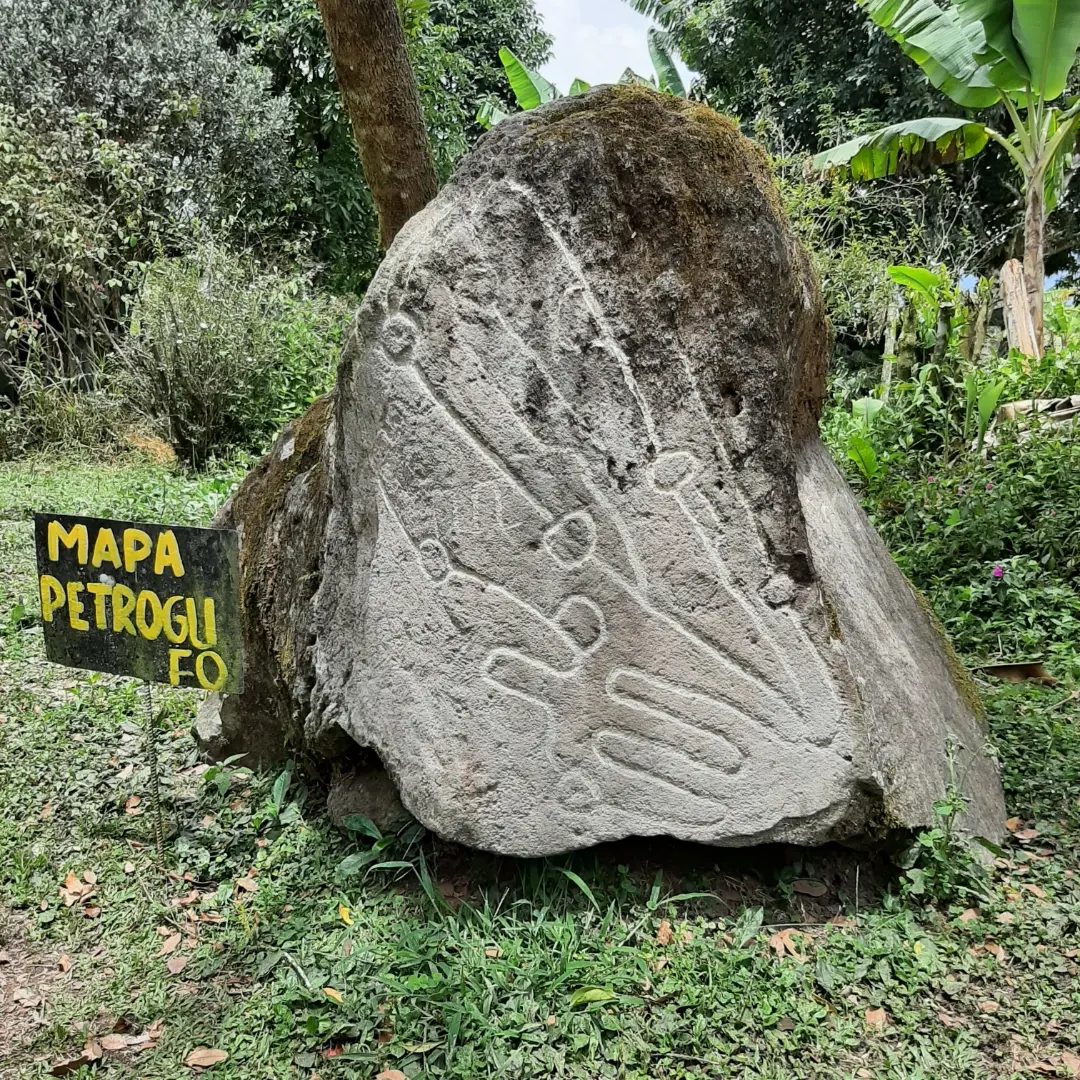

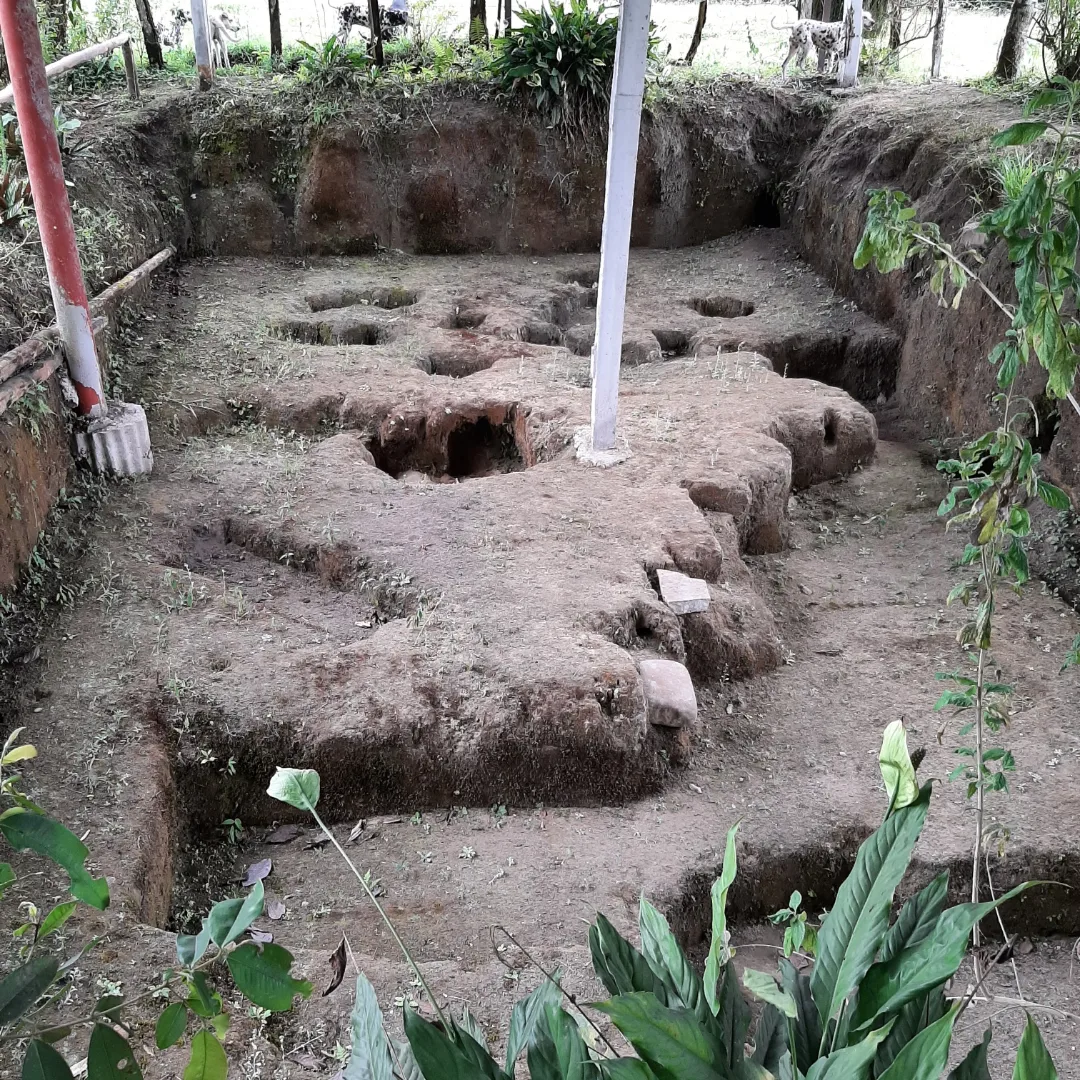

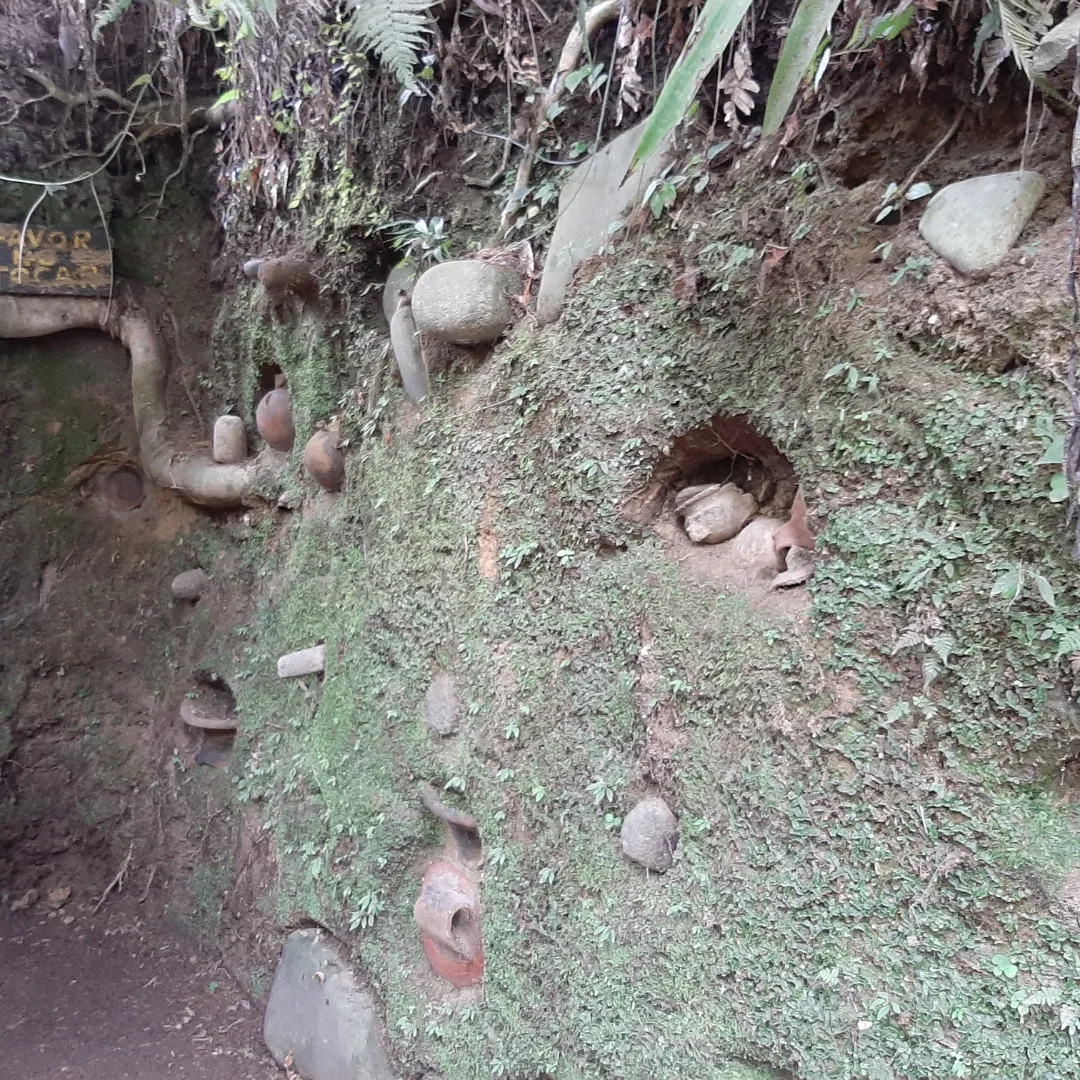
