= La Caldera (NFT collection) =

NFT collection by Shakira

La Caldera is a non-fungible token (NFT) collection created by Colombian singer-songwriter Shakira and Australian graphic designer BossLogic released on 21 September 2021. The collection consists of four pieces named "Zenith", "Caloris", "Watch, Don't Touch", and "Save Me from Myself". Each piece features music by Shakira and animated, digitally altered pictures of Shakira in the fantasy world of Caloris.

== Background and release ==
After releasing the single "Don't Wait Up" in July 2021, Shakira revealed in an interview that she is in a "supremely creative moment", with "a great desire to create, lots of ideas, lots of songs coming into [her] hands." On 16 September, she announced the release of her first NFT collection, titled La Caldera. A collaboration with Australian digital artist BossLogic, known for his pop culture artwork, La Caldera was launched on NFT platform MakersPlace on 21 September 2021. The collection's proceeds supported Shakira's Pies Descalzos Foundation, aiding education and helping poor children in Colombia, and offset carbon emissions by allocating compensation to forest conservation projects via substainability network Aerial. The prices of the works, sold in Ethereum cryptocurrency, ranged from 0.6 Ethereum worth USD $935 up to 20 Ethereum worth USD $61.000.

Shakira first invested in crypto assets in 2020, when she and her then-boyfriend Gerard Piqué invested €3 million in crypto videogame company Sorare. She entered the NFT market in 2021, a year marked by explosive growth in the sector. NFT sales volume reached $24.9 billion in 2021, a significant jump from $94.9 million in 2020, driven by digital art and celebrity endorsements.

== Design ==
La Caldera features themes of female empowerment in the fictional world of Caloris, an intergalactic landscape ruled by women. The collection consists of digital artworks, created by BossLogic, whose real name is Kobe Abdo. Each digital artwork is accompanied by an original audio piece produced by Shakira, creating a multisensory experience. On one of the tracks Shakira sings in Portuguese: "minha vida é você" (English: "my life is you.") The collection comprised four artworks: "Zenith", "Save Me From Myself", "Caloris", and "Watch, Don’t Touch". Each features Shakira as a warrior in a futuristic style, while in the latter is featured also Gerard Piqué embracing her. The visual art style of the collection has been described as "retro-futuristic", blending mythological themes with graphic novel and vintage poster-inspired designs.
