= Caldera River =

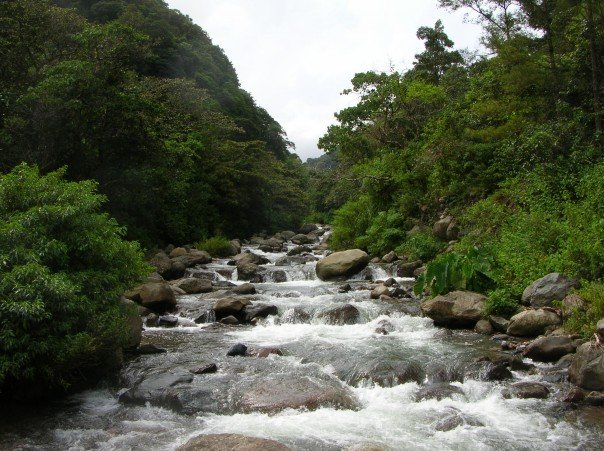

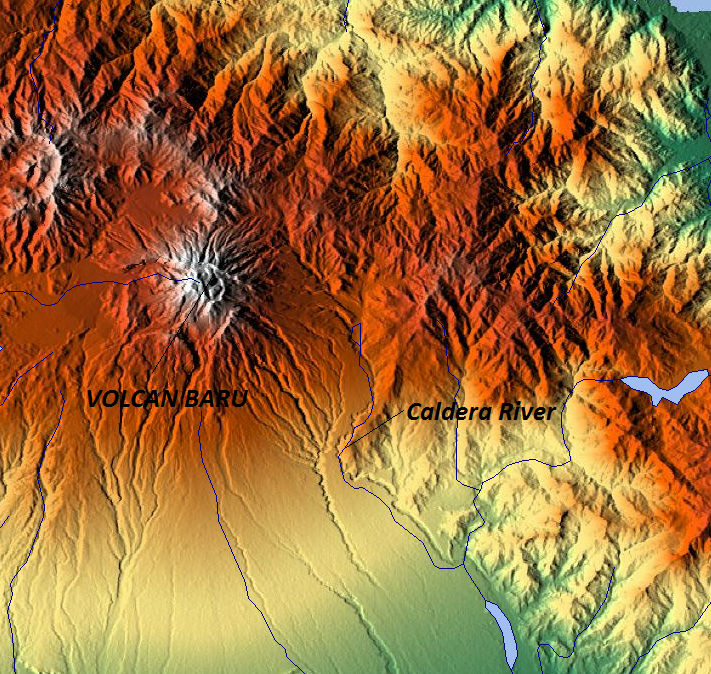
- Native name: Río Caldera (Spanish)

Location
- Country: Panama

Physical characteristics
- Source: Volcán Barú
  - location: Chiriqui Province, Panama
  - coordinates: 8.848534°N 82.487498°W
- Mouth: Chiriqui Nuevo River
  - coordinates: 8°37′10″N 82°21′23″W

The Caldera River (Spanish: Rio Caldera) is a river of Panama. It passes through the town of Boquete and flows through the Volcán Barú National Park in Chiriqui. It flooded its banks in November 2008. It caused extensive damage to infrastructure and many roads had to be repaired.

During 2026 the Ministry of Public Works was promoting a project to dredge and channel a section of the river in and near the city of Boquete, stemming from the national state of emergency declared on the 14th of November, 2024 due to the constant flooding of the river and causing erosion and putting homes, infrastructure and sections of the road network at risk. The project aims to expand the channel to a width of 30 metres (98 ft) and dredge to a depth of up to 3.5 metres (11 ft) at its deepest point. Non-metallic material won from the project will be stored temporarily and used for public works in the district. The Project will be carried out by the Ministry of Public Works via a contractor, Ininco, SA.
