= Caldera, Chiriquí =

Coordinates: 8.6617°N 82.3708°W

Caldera
- Corregimiento
- Location within Panama
- Country: Panama
- Province: Chiriquí
- District: Boquete

Area
  - Land: 147 km^{2} (57 sq mi)

Population (2010)
  - Total: 1,560
  - Density: 10.6/km^{2} (27/sq mi)
- Population density calculated based on land area.
- Time zone: UTC−5 (EST)

Caldera is a corregimiento in Boquete District, Chiriquí Province, Panama. It has a land area of 147 square kilometres (57 sq mi) and had a population of 1,560 as of 2010, giving it a population density of 10.6 inhabitants per square kilometre (27/sq mi). Its population as of 1990 was 1,175; its population as of 2000 was 1,204.
