= Căldăraru (disambiguation) =

Căldăraru is a commune in Argeș County, Romania.

Căldăraru may also refer to:

- Căldăraru, a village in Cernica commune, Ilfov County, Romania
- Căldăraru, a tributary of the Glavacioc in Teleorman County, Romania

== See also ==
- Căldărușa (disambiguation)
