= Concept (Sam Rivers album) =

Live album by Sam Rivers Trio
- Released: 1997
- Recorded: 1995–1996
- Venue: various locations in Florida, United States
- Genre: Free jazz
- Length: 1:06:25
- Label: Rivbea; RB50101
- Producer: Doug Mathews

Sam Rivers chronology
Configuration (1996)	Concept (1997)	Portrait (1997)

Concept is an album by the Sam Rivers Trio, led by multi-instrumentalist and composer Rivers, and featuring double bassist and bass clarinetist Doug Mathews and drummer and saxophonist Anthony Cole. Consisting of both studio and live recordings, it was recorded during 1995 and 1996 at various locations in Florida, United States, and was released in 1997 by Rivers' Rivbea label.

== Reception ==
Professional ratings
Review scores
Source	Rating
The Penguin Guide to Jazz	3.5/4 stars
The Rolling Stone Jazz & Blues Album Guide	3/5 stars
Tom Hull – on the Web	B+

The authors of The Penguin Guide to Jazz Recordings called the album "tightly constructed" and "a fine achievement." They wrote: "The playing is consistently fascinating... the track titles here are entirely abstract... and the music has something of that quality as well."

Peter Margasak of the Chicago Reader stated that the album "proves that Rivers's ferocity is undiminished," and commented: "Certain passages recall his free-bop playing of the 60s, but frequently the music burns hotter than anything he's done, marked by his usual thoughtfulness and depth."

A writer for the Orlando Sentinel noted that the album "should cause considerable excitement in jazz circles everywhere because the new material represents a whole period of artistic growth that has not yet been documented."

In a column for the CMJ New Music Report, Mac McCaughan included the album in his "artists' personal picks."

== Track listing ==
Composed by Sam Rivers.

1. "View" – 5:03
2. "Sprung" – 4:57
3. "Aspect" – 12:22
4. "Point" – 8:01
5. "Line" – 14:01
6. "Concept" – 6:00
7. "Link" – 9:42
8. "Notion" – 2:45
9. "Figure" – 3:34
- "Line" was recorded at Cafe Bravo in Daytona Beach, Florida, on July 8, 1995. "Figure" was recorded at Cafe DaVinci in Deland, Florida, on February 10, 1996. "Point" was recorded at Park Studios in Altamonte Springs, Florida, on March 18, 1996. Remaining tracks were recorded at Doug Mathews' Avant Workshop Studio in Gotha, Florida, on April 23, 1996, and May 13, 1996.

== Personnel ==
- Sam Rivers – tenor saxophone, soprano saxophone, flute, piano
- Doug Mathews – double bass, electric bass, bass clarinet
- Anthony Cole – drums, tenor saxophone
