= Candela, Coahuila =

City in the Mexican state of Coahuila

Candela
- City
- Location within Mexico
- Coordinates: 26°50′N 100°39′W
- Country: Mexico
- State: Coahuila
- Municipality: Candela
- Founded: 1690 (Alonso de León)

Government
  - Mayor: Macedonio Lopez Perez
- Elevation: 430 m (1,410 ft)

Population (2000)
  - Total: 1,672
  - Demonym: Candelense
- Time zone: UTC-6 (Central (US Central))
- Postal code: 25701
- Area code: 873

Candela is a city in the central region (Región Centro) of the northern Mexican state of Coahuila. It is the municipal seat of the surrounding municipality of Candela. There were 1,669 inhabitants in 2000. In 2011, according to Wolfram Alpha, it had a population of 1,672.

It was founded in 1690 by General Alonso de León as a mission called San Bernardino de la Candela.

== Attractions ==
Candela attracts people with its beautiful mountainous features and gaping deserts. There are three aquatic recreational areas in Candela: Los Carrisitos, Las Lajitas and El Ojo de Agua.

Los Carrisitos is made up of pools that are filled with mountain water. It is also a great place to go on a carne asada (term for a Mexican-style barbecue).

Las Lajitas is part of the Candela river which leads downstream to the town. It is notable for the shape of its rocks, hence the name "Las Lajitas".

El Ojo de Agua is a spring of thermoheated waters. One can enjoy a skin renewal bath there.

Another noteworthy asset of Candela is that it boasts several vast ranch-estates in its vicinity, such as the Santa Lucia de Sanmiguel - one of a few hidden jewels amongst the mountains. Like other isolated mountain towns, Candela is a religiously cultured place. One well-known chapel that is near the previously mentioned ranch, a tiny, open-air structure erected in the honor of the Virgen of Guadalupe, is a place in which many ranchers and townspeople alike use as a sanctuary to lay roses and rosaries and to pray for their loved ones.
