= Buri =

Buri may refer to:

== People ==
- Buri (Dacian tribe), or Burs, a 1st–2nd century tribe living in Dacia
- Buri tribe, an ancient Germanic people
- Büri (died 1252), prince of the Chagatai Khanate
- Buri, or Burebista, Thracian king of the Getae and Dacian from 82/61 BC–45/44 BC
- Taj al-Muluk Buri (died 1132), Prince of Damascus and namesake of its Buri dynasty
- Antti Buri (born 1988), Finnish racing driver

== Places ==
- Buri, Bahrain
- Buri, São Paulo, Brazil
- Buri Peninsula, Eritrea
- Buri, Iran
- Burí, Jirondai, Panama, a corregimiento in Jirondai District, Ngäbe-Buglé Comarca, Republic of Panama
- Büri, Panama, a corregimiento in Kankintú District, Ngäbe-Buglé Comarca, Republic of Panama
- The name of several Thai mueangs (city-states)
- Burri Almahas, Sudan

== Other uses ==
- Búri, a Norse god
- Búri (cave), a lava tube in Iceland
- Buri palm, or Corypha, a genus of Australasian palms
- Batok, or buri, traditional Philippine tattoos
- Japanese amberjack, or buri, a fish used for sushi and sashimi

== See also ==
- Bury (disambiguation)
- Puri (disambiguation)
