= Llano Tugrí =

- City
- Location within Panama
- Coordinates: 8°28′N 81°42′W
- Country: Panama
- Comarca: Ngäbe-Buglé Comarca
- District: Müna District

Population
  - Total: 420
- Climate: Am

Llano Tugrí or Buabïti, also referred to as Buabidi, Buabti, and Buäbti, is the capital of Comarca Ngäbe-Buglé, Panama. It is located in the village of Peña Blanca in the district of Müna. It is surrounded by mountains and is characterized by a pleasant climate.

Llano Tugrí can be accessed from San Felix, Province of Chiriqui.
