= Burí, Jirondai, Panama =

Burí
- Corregimiento
- Country: Panama
- Comarca Indígena: Ngäbe-Buglé Comarca
- District: Jirondai
- Time zone: UTC−5 (EST)

Burí is a corregimiento in Jirondai District in Ngäbe-Buglé Comarca in the Republic of Panama.
