= Cerro Pelado, Ngäbe-Buglé =

Cerro Pelado
- Corregimiento
- Country: Panama
- Comarca Indígena: Ngäbe-Buglé Comarca
- District: Ñürüm
- Time zone: UTC−5 (EST)

Cerro Pelado is a corregimiento in Ngäbe-Buglé Comarca in the Republic of Panama.
