= Alto Bilingüe =

Coordinates: 8°36′N 81°14′W

- Corregimiento
- Interactive map of Alto Bilingüe
- Country: Panama
- Comarca Indígena: Ngäbe-Buglé Comarca
- District: Santa Catalina o Calovébora
- Time zone: UTC−5 (EST)

Alto Bilingüe is a corregimiento in Ngäbe-Buglé Comarca in the Republic of Panama.
