= Guayabito, Ngäbe-Buglé =

Guayabito
- Corregimiento
- Location within Panama
- Country: Panama
- Comarca Indígena: Ngäbe-Buglé Comarca
- District: Ñürüm
- Time zone: UTC−5 (EST)

Guayabito is a corregimiento in Ngäbe-Buglé Comarca in the Republic of Panama.
