= El Piro =

- Corregimiento
- Interactive map of El Piro
- Country: Panama
- Comarca Indígena: Ngäbe-Buglé Comarca
- District: Ñürüm
- Time zone: UTC−5 (EST)

El Piro is a corregimiento in Ngäbe-Buglé Comarca in the Republic of Panama.
