= El Paredón, Panama =

El Paredón
- Corregimiento
- Interactive map of El Paredón
- Country: Panama
- Comarca Indígena: Ngäbe-Buglé Comarca
- District: Ñürüm
- Time zone: UTC−5 (EST)

El Paredón is a corregimiento in Ngäbe-Buglé Comarca in the Republic of Panama.
