= Cerro Puerco =

Coordinates: 8°21′0″N 81°40′59″W

- Corregimiento
- Interactive map of Cerro Puerco
- Country: Panama
- Comarca Indígena: Ngäbe-Buglé Comarca
- District: Müna
- Time zone: UTC−5 (EST)

Cerro Puerco is a corregimiento in Ngäbe-Buglé Comarca in the Republic of Panama.
