= Emplanada de Chorcha =

- Corregimiento
- Interactive map of Emplanada de Chorcha
- Country: Panama
- Comarca Indígena: Ngäbe-Buglé Comarca
- District: Besikó
- Time zone: UTC−5 (EST)

Emplanada de Chorcha is a corregimiento in Ngäbe-Buglé Comarca in the Republic of Panama.
