= Cascabel, Panama =

Coordinates: 8°32′N 81°52′W

Cascabel
- Corregimiento
- Interactive map of Cascabel
- Country: Panama
- Comarca Indígena: Ngäbe-Buglé Comarca
- District: Mironó
- Time zone: UTC−5 (EST)

Cascabel is a corregimiento in Ngäbe-Buglé Comarca in the Republic of Panama.
