= Nämnoní =

- Corregimiento
- Interactive map of Nämnoní
- Coordinates: 8.365°N 81.969°W
- Country: Panama
- Comarca Indígena: Ngäbe-Buglé Comarca
- District: Besikó
- Time zone: UTC−5 (EST)

Nämnoní is a corregimiento in Ngäbe-Buglé Comarca in the Republic of Panama.
