= Kusapín District =

Kusapín
- District
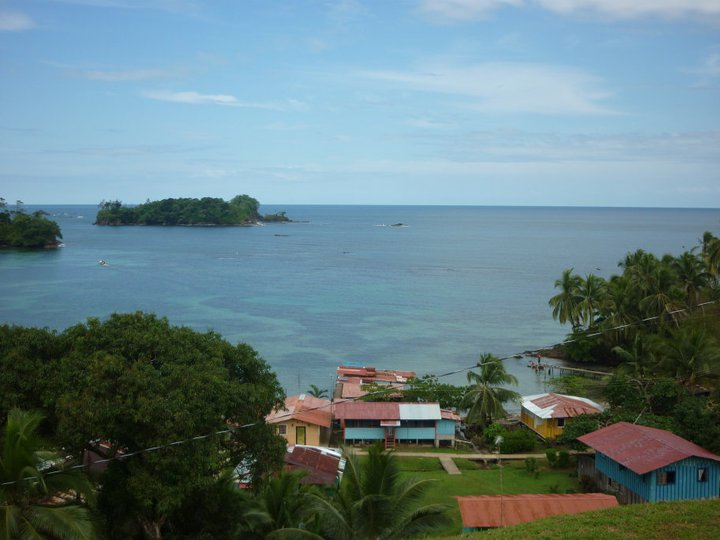

- Country: Panama
- Comarca indígena: Ngäbe-Buglé
- Sub-Region: Ño Kribo
- Capital: Kusapín
- Established: 10 March 1997

Area
  - Total: 1,693.2 km^{2} (653.7 sq mi)

Population (2010)
  - Total: 20,909
  - Density: 12.349/km^{2} (31.983/sq mi)
- Time zone: UTC-5 (ETZ)

Kusapín District is a district (distrito) of Ngäbe-Buglé Comarca in Panama.

== Administrative divisions ==
Kusapín District is divided administratively into the following corregimientos:

- Bahía Azul
- Cañaveral
- Kusapín
- Río Chíriquí
- Tobobé
