= Susama =

- Corregimiento
- Interactive map of Susama
- Coordinates: 8°21′40″N 81°48′00″W
- Country: Panama
- Comarca Indígena: Ngäbe-Buglé Comarca
- District: Nole Duima
- Time zone: UTC−5 (EST)

Susama is a corregimiento in Ngäbe-Buglé Comarca in the Republic of Panama.
