= Guoroní =

Coordinates: 8°43′N 81°46′W

- Corregimiento
- Interactive map of Guoroní
- Country: Panama
- Comarca Indígena: Ngäbe-Buglé Comarca
- District: Kankintú
- Time zone: UTC−5 (EST)

Guoroní is a corregimiento in Ngäbe-Buglé Comarca in the Republic of Panama.
