= Maraca, Panama =

Coordinates: 8°22′N 81°44′W

Maraca
- Corregimiento
- Interactive map of Maraca
- Country: Panama
- Comarca Indígena: Ngäbe-Buglé Comarca
- District: Müna
- Time zone: UTC−5 (EST)

Maraca is a corregimiento in Ngäbe-Buglé Comarca in the Republic of Panama.
