= Agua de Salud =

- Corregimiento
- Interactive map of Agua de Salud
- Location within Panama
- Coordinates: 8°30′00″N 81°28′00″W
- Country: Panama
- Comarca Indígena: Ngäbe-Buglé Comarca
- District: Ñürüm
- Time zone: UTC−5 (EST)

Agua de Salud is a corregimiento in Ngäbe-Buglé Comarca in the Republic of Panama.
