= Gatú o Gatucito =

Coordinates: 8.5333°N 80.9333°W

- Corregimiento
- Location within Panama
- Country: Panama
- Province: Veraguas
- District: Santa Fé

Area
  - Land: 95.5 km^{2} (36.9 sq mi)

Population (2010)
  - Total: 1,315
  - Density: 13.8/km^{2} (36/sq mi)
- Population density calculated based on land area.
- Time zone: UTC−5 (EST)

Gatú o Gatucito is a corregimiento in Santa Fé District, Veraguas Province, Panama with a population of 1,315 as of 2010. Its population as of 1990 was 1,670, going up to 1,707 as of 2000.
