= Nibra, Panama =

Nibra
- Corregimiento
- Interactive map of Nibra
- Location within Panama Location within Central America
- Coordinates: 8°20′00″N 81°34′00″W
- Country: Panama
- Comarca Indígena: Ngäbe-Buglé Comarca
- District: Müna
- Time zone: UTC−5 (EST)

Nibra is a corregimiento in Ngäbe-Buglé Comarca in the Republic of Panama.
