= Río Luis =

- Corregimiento
- Location within Panama
- Country: Panama
- Province: Veraguas
- District: Santa Fé
- Established: July 29, 1998

Area
  - Land: 259.2 km^{2} (100.1 sq mi)

Population (2010)
  - Total: 2,204
  - Density: 8.5/km^{2} (22/sq mi)
- Population density calculated based on land area.
- Time zone: UTC−5 (EST)

Río Luis is a corregimiento in Santa Fé District, Veraguas Province, Panama with a population of 2,204 as of 2010. It was created by Law 58 of July 29, 1998, owing to the Declaration of Unconstitutionality of Law 1 of 1982. Its population as of 2000 was 1,708.
