= El Piro No. 2 =

- Corregimiento
- Interactive map of El Piro No. 2
- Coordinates: 8°24′47″N 81°31′17″W
- Country: Panama
- Comarca Indígena: Ngäbe-Buglé Comarca
- District: Ñürüm
- Time zone: UTC−5 (EST)

El Piro No. 2 is a corregimiento in Ngäbe-Buglé Comarca in the Republic of Panama.
