= Umaní =

- Corregimiento
- Interactive map of Umaní
- Location within Panama
- Coordinates: 8°17′20″N 81°44′02″W
- Country: Panama
- Comarca Indígena: Ngäbe-Buglé Comarca
- District: Müna
- Time zone: UTC−5 (EST)

Umaní is a corregimiento in Ngäbe-Buglé Comarca in the Republic of Panama.
