= Piedra Roja =

Piedra Roja may refer to:

- Piedra Roja (festival), a music festival in Chile
- Piedra Roja, Panama, a corregimiento in Ngäbe-Buglé Comarca, Panama
