= Alto de Jesús =

Coordinates: 8°16′N 81°29′W

- Corregimiento
- Interactive map of Alto de Jesús
- Country: Panama
- Comarca Indígena: Ngäbe-Buglé Comarca
- District: Ñürüm
- Time zone: UTC−5 (EST)

Alto de Jesús is a corregimiento in Ngäbe-Buglé Comarca in the Republic of Panama.
