= Mününí =

Coordinates: 8°48′N 81°48′W

- Corregimiento
- Interactive map of Mününí
- Country: Panama
- Comarca Indígena: Ngäbe-Buglé Comarca
- District: Kankintú
- Time zone: UTC−5 (EST)

Mününí is a corregimiento in Ngäbe-Buglé Comarca, in the Republic of Panama.
