= Güibale =

Coordinates: 8°31′N 81°22′W

- Corregimiento
- Interactive map of Güibale
- Country: Panama
- Comarca Indígena: Ngäbe-Buglé Comarca
- District: Ñürüm
- Time zone: UTC−5 (EST)

Güibale is a corregimiento in Ngäbe-Buglé Comarca in the Republic of Panama.
