= Hato Chamí =

Coordinates: 8°27′N 81°46′W

- Corregimiento
- Interactive map of Hato Chamí
- Country: Panama
- Comarca Indígena: Ngäbe-Buglé Comarca
- District: Nole Duima
- Time zone: UTC−5 (EST)

Hato Chamí is a corregimiento in Ngäbe-Buglé Comarca in the Republic of Panama.
