= Peña Blanca, Ngäbe-Buglé =

Peña Blanca
- Corregimiento
- Interactive map of Peña Blanca
- Country: Panama
- Comarca Indígena: Ngäbe-Buglé Comarca
- District: Müna
- Time zone: UTC−5 (EST)

Peña Blanca is a corregimiento in Ngäbe-Buglé Comarca in the Republic of Panama.
