= Salto Dupí =

Coordinates: 8°21′N 81°53′W

- Corregimiento
- Interactive map of Salto Dupí
- Country: Panama
- Comarca Indígena: Ngäbe-Buglé Comarca
- District: Mironó
- Time zone: UTC−5 (EST)

Salto Dupí is a corregimiento in Ngäbe-Buglé Comarca in the Republic of Panama.
