= Lajero =

- Corregimiento
- Interactive map of Lajero
- Country: Panama
- Comarca Indígena: Ngäbe-Buglé Comarca
- District: Nole Duima
- Time zone: UTC−5 (EST)

Lajero is a corregimiento in Ngäbe-Buglé Comarca in the Republic of Panama.
