= Sitio Prado =

Coordinates: 8°22′N 81°35′W

- Corregimiento
- Interactive map of Sitio Prado
- Country: Panama
- Comarca Indígena: Ngäbe-Buglé Comarca
- District: Müna
- Time zone: UTC−5 (EST)

Sitio Prado is a corregimiento in Ngäbe-Buglé Comarca in the Republic of Panama.
