= Boca de Balsa =

Coordinates: 8°32′N 82°02′W

- Corregimiento
- Interactive map of Boca de Balsa
- Country: Panama
- Comarca Indígena: Ngäbe-Buglé Comarca
- District: Besikó
- Time zone: UTC−5 (EST)

Boca de Balsa is a corregimiento in Ngäbe-Buglé Comarca in the Republic of Panama.
