= Diko, Panama =

Diko
- Corregimiento
- Interactive map of Diko
- Location within Panama
- Coordinates: 8°24′56″N 81°41′57″W
- Country: Panama
- Comarca Indígena: Ngäbe-Buglé Comarca
- District: Müna
- Time zone: UTC−5 (EST)

Diko is a corregimiento in Ngäbe-Buglé Comarca in the Republic of Panama.
