= Alto Caballero =

Coordinates: 8°17′N 81°40′W

- Corregimiento
- Interactive map of Alto Caballero
- Country: Panama
- Comarca Indígena: Ngäbe-Buglé Comarca
- District: Müna
- Time zone: UTC−5 (EST)

Alto Caballero is a corregimiento in Ngäbe-Buglé Comarca in the Republic of Panama.
