= Cerro Banco =

- Corregimiento
- Interactive map of Cerro Banco
- Coordinates: 8°28′0.1″N 81°58′59.9″W
- Country: Panama
- Comarca Indígena: Ngäbe-Buglé Comarca
- District: Besikó
- Time zone: UTC−5 (EST)

Cerro Banco is a corregimiento located in the Ngäbe-Buglé Comarca of the Republic of Panama.
