= Quebrada de Loro =

- Corregimiento
- Interactive map of Quebrada de Loro
- Location within Panama
- Coordinates: 8°21′N 81°57′W
- Country: Panama
- Comarca Indígena: Ngäbe-Buglé Comarca
- District: Mironó
- Time zone: UTC−5 (EST)

Quebrada de Loro is a corregimiento in Ngäbe-Buglé Comarca in the Republic of Panama.
