= Bahía Azul, Panama =

Coordinates: 9°08′N 81°53′W

Bahía Azul
- Corregimiento
- Interactive map of Bahía Azul
- Country: Panama
- Comarca Indígena: Ngäbe-Buglé Comarca
- District: Kusapín
- Time zone: UTC−5 (EST)

Bahía Azul is a corregimiento in Ngäbe-Buglé Comarca in the Republic of Panama.
