= Kankintú District =

Kankintú
- District
- Country: Panama
- Comarca indígena: Ngäbe-Buglé
- Sub-Region: Ño Kribo
- Capital: Bisira
- Established: 28 October 1998

Area
  - Total: 2,422.1 km^{2} (935.2 sq mi)

Population (2010)
  - Total: 33,121
  - Density: 13.674/km^{2} (35.417/sq mi)
- Time zone: UTC-5 (ETZ)

Kankintú District is a district (distrito) of Ngäbe-Buglé Comarca in Panama.

== Administrative divisions ==
Kusapín District is divided administratively into the following corregimientos:

- Bisira
- Calante
- Kankintú
- Guoroní
- Mününí
- Piedra Roja
- Tolote
