= Tobobé =

- Corregimiento
- Interactive map of Tobobé
- Location within Panama
- Coordinates: 9°07′00″N 81°50′00″W
- Country: Panama
- Comarca Indígena: Ngäbe-Buglé Comarca
- District: Kusapín
- Time zone: UTC−5 (EST)

Tobobé is a corregimiento in Ngäbe-Buglé Comarca in the Republic of Panama.
