= San Pedrito, Panama =

San Pedrito
- Corregimiento
- Interactive map of San Pedrito
- Country: Panama
- Comarca Indígena: Ngäbe-Buglé Comarca
- District: Santa Catalina o Calovébora
- Time zone: UTC−5 (EST)

San Pedrito is a corregimiento in Ngäbe-Buglé Comarca in the Republic of Panama.
