= Niba =

- Corregimiento
- Location within Panama
- Country: Panama
- Comarca Indígena: Ngäbe-Buglé Comarca
- District: Besikó
- Time zone: UTC−5 (EST)

Niba is a corregimiento in Ngäbe-Buglé Comarca in the Republic of Panama.
