= El Bale =

Coordinates: 8°21′N 81°22′W

- Corregimiento
- Interactive map of El Bale
- Country: Panama
- Comarca Indígena: Ngäbe-Buglé Comarca
- District: Ñürüm
- Time zone: UTC−5 (EST)

El Bale is a corregimiento in Ngäbe-Buglé Comarca in the Republic of Panama.
