= El Pantano =

- Corregimiento
- Location within Panama
- Coordinates: 8.5500°N 81.0667°W
- Country: Panama
- Province: Veraguas
- District: Santa Fé

Area
  - Land: 52.5 km^{2} (20.3 sq mi)

Population (2010)
  - Total: 658
  - Density: 12.5/km^{2} (32/sq mi)
- Population density calculated based on land area.
- Time zone: UTC−5 (EST)

El Pantano is a corregimiento in Santa Fé District, Veraguas Province, Panama with a population of 658 as of 2010. Its population as of 1990 was 725; its population as of 2000 was 676.
