= Rubén Cantú, Panama =

Rubén Cantú
- Corregimiento
- Country: Panama
- Province: Veraguas
- District: Santa Fé
- Established: June 24, 2008

Area
  - Land: 69.8 km^{2} (26.9 sq mi)

Population (2010)
  - Total: 1,160
  - Density: 16.6/km^{2} (43/sq mi)
- Population density calculated based on land area.
- Time zone: UTC−5 (EST)

Rubén Cantú is a corregimiento in Santa Fé District, Veraguas Province, Panama with a population of 1,160 as of 2010. It was created by Law 37 of June 24, 2008.
