= Calovébora =

Coordinates: 8.8000°N 81.2167°W

- Corregimiento
- Location within Panama
- Country: Panama
- Province: Veraguas
- District: Santa Fé

Area
  - Land: 1,127.3 km^{2} (435.3 sq mi)

Population (2010)
  - Total: 4,397
  - Density: 3.9/km^{2} (10/sq mi)
- Population density calculated based on land area.
- Time zone: UTC−5 (EST)

Calovébora is a corregimiento in Santa Fé District, Veraguas Province, Panama with a population of 4,397 as of 2010. Its population as of 1990 was 3,043, and its population as of 2000 was 2,342.
