= El Alto, Panama =

Coordinates: 8.5167°N 81.0500°W

El Alto
- Corregimiento
- Location within Panama
- Country: Panama
- Province: Veraguas
- District: Santa Fé

Area
  - Land: 85 km^{2} (33 sq mi)

Population (2010)
  - Total: 1,318
  - Density: 15.5/km^{2} (40/sq mi)
- Population density calculated based on land area.
- Time zone: UTC−5 (EST)

El Alto is a corregimiento in Santa Fé District, Veraguas Province, Panama with a population of 1,318 as of 2010. Its population as of 1990 was 2,242; its population as of 2000 was 2,060.
