= El Cuay =

- Corregimiento
- Location within Panama
- Country: Panama
- Province: Veraguas
- District: Santa Fé

Area
  - Land: 85.6 km^{2} (33.1 sq mi)

Population (2010)
  - Total: 1,486
  - Density: 17.4/km^{2} (45/sq mi)
- Population density calculated based on land area.
- Time zone: UTC−5 (EST)

El Cuay is a corregimiento in Santa Fé District, Veraguas Province, Panama, with a population of 1,486 as of 2010. Its population as of 1990 was 1,558; its population as of 2000 was 1,588.
