= Río Chiriquí, Ngäbe-Buglé =

Coordinates: 8°25′N 82°21′W

Río Chiriquí
- Corregimiento
- Interactive map of Río Chiriquí
- Country: Panama
- Comarca Indígena: Ngäbe-Buglé Comarca
- District: Kusapín
- Time zone: UTC−5 (EST)

Río Chiriquí is a corregimiento in Ngäbe-Buglé Comarca in the Republic of Panama.
