= Peperomia veraguana =

Scientific classification
- Kingdom: Plantae
- Clade: Tracheophytes
- Clade: Angiosperms
- Clade: Magnoliids
- Order: Piperales
- Family: Piperaceae
- Genus: Peperomia
- Species: P. veraguana

Binomial name
- Peperomia veraguana Callejas

Species of epiphyte

Peperomia veraguana is a species of epiphyte from the genus Peperomia. It grows in wet tropical biomes. It was discovered by Ricardo Callejas in 2020.

== Etymology ==
veraguana came from the word "Veraguas". This refers to the species being discovered in Veraguas, Panama.

== Distribution ==
Peperomia veraguana is endemic to Panama. Specimens can be collected at an altitude of 700-1000 meters.

- Panama
  - Veraguas
    - Santa Fe
      - Cerro Tute
