= Silvia Carrera =

General Cacique of the Ngäbe-Bulgé Comarca indigenous territory of Panama

Silvia Carrera Concepción

Cacique of Ngäbe-Buglé Comarca
- Incumbent
- Assumed office September 2011

Personal details
- Born: Silvia Carrera; 1970 (age 55–56) Cerro Pelado (Ñürüm), Ngäbe-Buglé Comarca
- Party: Independent

Silvia Carrera Concepción (born 1970 in Cerro Pelado) is the current General Cacique of the Ngäbe-Buglé Comarca autonomous indigenous territory of western Panama. She was elected in September 2011.

She has received global attention after representing her people in discussions with the Government of Panama concerning mineral mining within the Comarca. She also received additional notoriety by publicly refusing an invitation from President Ricardo Martinelli of Panama to dine with him at the Presidential Palace in Panama City to discuss permitting copper mining in the Ngäbe-Buglé Comarca.

== Quotes ==
- "The land is our mother. It is because of her that we live. The people will defend our mother."
- "The government use us to entertain themselves, saying one thing today and another tomorrow."
