= Buenos Aires, Ñürüm =

Buenos Aires
- Corregimiento
- Location within Panama
- Country: Panama
- Comarca Indígena: Ngäbe-Buglé Comarca
- District: Ñürüm
- Time zone: UTC−5 (EST)

Buenos Aires is a corregimiento in Ngäbe-Buglé Comarca in the Republic of Panama.
