= Chichica, Ngöbe-Buglé =

Coordinates: 8°21′50″N 81°40′06″W

Chichica is located in the Comarca (indigenous reservation) Ngäbe-Buglé in the Republic of Panama . Before the formation of the Comarca in 1997, Chichica was in the province of Chiriquí in the Republic of Panama. The Comarca is divided into three regions: Ňö Kribo, Nedrini, and Kadri. Each of these is divided into districts, and the districts are divided into corregimientos, or townships per the Panamanian system. Chichica is located in the region Kadri, District Münä, and corregimiento of Chichica.

The Comarca Ngäbe-Buglé is characterized by mountainous terrain, steep slopes, and generally nutrient poor soil with high rock content, all characteristics that make farming difficult. This is interesting because agriculture and subsistence farming are the main forms of work in the Comarca. On the Caribbean slope there is no dry season and tropical forest dominates the landscape; on the Pacific slope there is a windy dry season (December to April) and a wet season. As a result of increased seasonal variation, there are more localized geographies on the Pacific slope and vegetation consists of grasses mixed with tropical forest cover. Small perennial streams and larger rivers run on both sides of the continental divide and are used for bathing, laundry, and drinking. In the region most travel is done on foot or horseback, however in the community of Chichica year-round road access is available.

The topography of Chichica is dominated by ridges and valleys, where the concentration of population is along the ridges extending into the valleys. The main town of Chichica is more contiguous as neighborhoods expand or as older neighborhoods grow from water sources in the valleys toward the main ridge. To the North is the Cordillera, or central spine of mountains, that split Panama in North and South halves. To the South are the Pacific Ocean and the coastal plain – making Chichica in the Pacific slope climate. Chichica and its corregimiento does not touch the Cordillera or the Pacific Ocean, however these two topographical/geological formations play heavily into the climate, transportation, diet, and daily lives of the people of Chichica.

The city of Chichica is located 8.4 miles (13.5 kilometers) North of Tolé in direct line of travel. On roads, Chichica is 15.7 miles (25.2 kilometers) North of Tolé. Using public transportation, which can be picked up at the piquera, or bus stop, in Tolé, it takes between 45 minutes and 1 hour to reach Chichica. Using private transportation, which 4x4 is necessary, the time can be cut in half. Its primary road is oriented in a Southwesterly to Northeasterly direction on top of a ridge. The initial rise into Chichica from the river – Río Culebra – and stream – Quebrada Otoe – is Northwest to Southeast. Lastly, in the neighborhood of Cuatro Pinos, the road changes to a direct North/South orientation.

As you drive into Chichica from Tolé, the first neighborhood is El Retiero – which is located on the initial incline into Chichica, until the road changes to its SW/NE direction. At this point, there is a trail on your right that leads to the neighborhood of Cerro Plata – a 45 minute walk from the Chichica schools. As you continue forward into Chichica, the neighborhood of La Loma will be to your left, before you reach the store “La Tiendita.” La Loma continues down the hill and wraps behind the school where it meets up with the neighborhood of Las Naranjas. The main part of town that runs from “La Tiendita” to the Health Center is called Chichica Centro or just Chichica. Within that space, there is a small path that runs off to the right, in front of the Evangelical Church, to the neighborhood of La Jujuca. This neighborhood runs past the stream all the way to the large rock outcrop that looks over La Tinta Valley. This trail is also the primary trail to Las Tijeras.

Just after the Health Center, there is a nondescript trail on the left to the neighborhood of La Pita – previously called Los Mangos. When the road diverges for the first time, you have reached the neighborhood of Cuatro Pinos. This neighborhood continues on both roads and stops at the large hill that descends toward Cerro Grito and Peña Blanca. The center of Cuatro Pinos, where a piquera used to exist, is at the triangle of land that divides the road the second time. This division routes the road toward Peña Blanca or toward Cerro Algadón. Lastly, if you follow the road that diverges toward Cerro Algadón, you will descend into the town of Las Lajitas. There is some disagreement about Las Lajitas being its own city or a neighborhood of Chichica; however, the consensus that has been discovered is that Las Lajitas is not part of Chichica due to gathered census data from the Panamanian Government. The main disagreement is between the age groups – older people dividing the two towns and younger people grouping Las Lajitas as a neighborhood of Chichica. There is a confusion of boundaries as well because of the conjoined aqueduct system and a cultural center of Chichica that is located in Las Lajitas.
