= Nole Duima District =

Nole Duima
- District
- Country: Panama
- Comarca indígena: Ngäbe-Buglé
- Sub-Region: Nidrini
- Capital: Cerro Iglesias

Area
  - Total: 185.1 km^{2} (71.5 sq mi)

Population (2010)
  - Total: 14,928
  - Density: 80.65/km^{2} (208.9/sq mi)
- Time zone: UTC-5 (ETZ)

Nole Duima District is a district (distrito) of Ngäbe-Buglé Comarca in Panama.

== Administrative divisions ==
Nole Duima District is divided administratively into the following corregimientos:

- Cerro Iglesias
- Hato Chamí
- Jädaberi
- Lajero
- Susama
