= Santa Catalina o Calovébora =

- Corregimiento
- Interactive map of Santa Catalina o Calovébora
- Country: Panama
- Comarca Indígena: Ngäbe-Buglé Comarca
- District: Santa Catalina o Calovébora
- Time zone: UTC−5 (EST)

Santa Catalina o Calovébora is a corregimiento in Ngäbe-Buglé Comarca in the Republic of Panama.
