= Jirondai District =

Jirondai
- District
- Country: Panama
- Comarca indígena: Ngäbe-Buglé
- Sub-Region: Ño Kribo
- Capital: Samboa
- Established: 10 May 2012

Population
  - Total: 24,150
- Time zone: UTC-5 (ETZ)

Jirondai District is a district (distrito) of Ngäbe-Buglé Comarca in Panama.

== Administrative divisions ==
Jirondai District is divided administratively into the following corregimientos:

- Büri
- Guariviara
- Man Creek
- Samboa
- Tuwai
