= Büri, Panama =

Büri
- Corregimiento
- Country: Panama
- Comarca Indígena: Ngäbe-Buglé Comarca
- District: Kankintú
- Time zone: UTC−5 (EST)

Büri is a corregimiento in Ngäbe-Buglé Comarca in the Republic of Panama.
