= Santa Fe District, Veraguas =

Santa Fe
- District
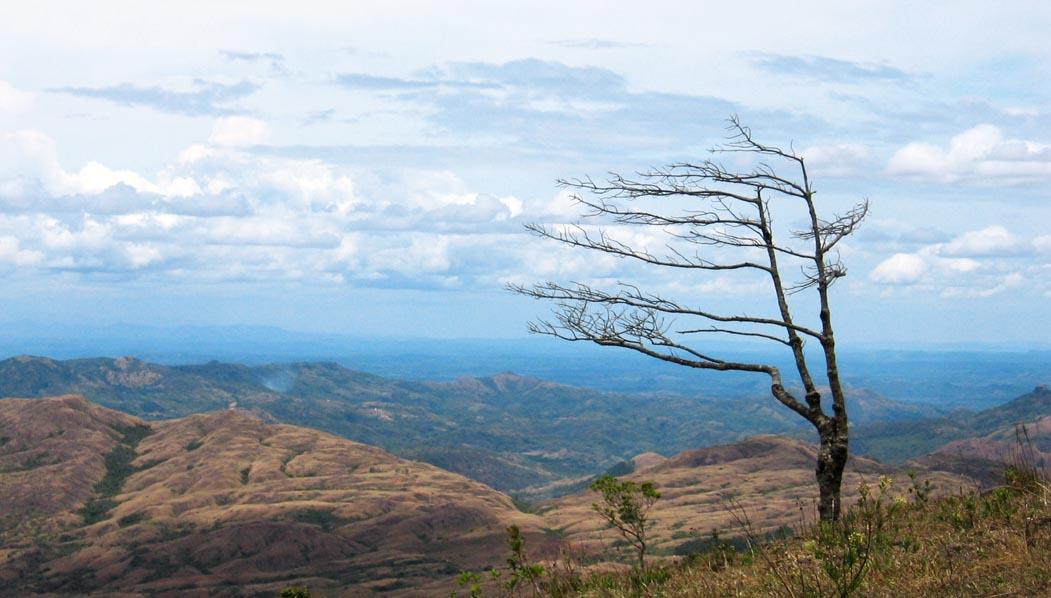

- Location of the district capital in Panama
- Coordinates: 8°30′N 81°04′W
- Country: Panama
- Province: Veraguas
- Capital: Santa Fe

Area
  - Total: 1,920 km^{2} (740 sq mi)

Population (2019)
  - Total: 17,341
- official estimate
- Time zone: UTC-5 (ETZ)

Santa Fe is a district (distrito) of Veraguas Province in Panama. The population according to the 2000 census was 12,890; the latest official estimate (for 2019) is 17,341. The district, which lies in the north of the province and comprises its entire Caribbean coastal area, covers a total area of 1,920 km^{2} (740 sq mi). The capital lies at the town of Santa Fe.

Santa Fe is known throughout Panamá for its orchids. There is an orchid exposition every August.

The Artisan Market in the Cabecera de Santa Fe makes and sells classic Panamá hats that are more durable and cheaper than hats found elsewhere in Panamá. In addition to the hats the artisan market also sells handmade indigenous style dresses for women and girls, as well as traditional hand-woven bags called "chakaras". The dresses and chakaras are characterized by bright colors and geometric patterns.

== History ==
The area to the north of the town Santa Fe was a gold mining region from the beginning of Spanish colonisation (and has remained so to this day). In 1557, the Spanish crown authorised the conquest of Veraguas. Captain Francisco Vázquez founded several towns, including Santa Fe in 1558. The now much bigger town of Santiago was founded in the mid 17th century by the inhabitants of Santa Fe and Montijo as a base for further colonisation.

Contemporary history has been marked by sharp class conflict. When the Catholic Church began to step up its operations in the province of Veraguas in the early 60s, Santa Fe was one of the poorest regions in Panama. At the time, there was around %90 illiteracy and widespread hunger, and the region was only connected to Santiago by an unpaved road, which was impossible to travel during much of the rainy season. A report by a group of social scientists and Church leaders claimed that the main problem was the extremely uneven distribution of power. A small group of families controlled most of the resources in the region, and owned the town's only stores. This group could buy produce cheaply from the peasants and sell to them dry goods at exorbitant prices since growers had no way of reaching external markets. This elite lent money as well, further deepening dependency, and its members would serve as town judges, mayors and representatives in national politics.

The situation changed dramatically shortly after a young priest by the name of Jesús Héctor Gallego Herrera was named Santa Fe's first priest in 1967. Gallego, influenced by early texts of Liberation Theology, began working in the fields with the peasants and learning about their situation. He soon organized them into "conversation circles" in which they would read the bible and analyze the peasants' situation in light of the sacred text. A movement soon emerged, that began exploring practical solutions to the poor people's needs. The movement first opened a consumer's cooperative, then it began to sell produce straight in the provincial markets, in effect cutting off the merchant elite.

By 1971, Santa Fe was beginning to change, as the peasants movement was growing by the day, and beginning to look for alliances on the provincial and national level. Panama had been controlled by the National Guard since 1968, and Gallego was well aware of the challenge his movement posed to Omar Torrijos, the country's populist dictator. Since Torrijos was himself vying for support in rural areas, the movement represented a grassroots alternative to the Guard's leadership. Only a decade earlier, Torrijos had personally put down an armed rebellion in the nearby Cerro Tute, and while Gallego was adamantly opposed to any form of violence, the regime may have feared that his movement would radicalize. If this was not enough, Alavaro Vernaza Herrera, Santa Fe's most powerful caudillo, was a cousin of the dictator — and so the movement's challenge could be seen as a personal one to Torrijos.

After a gradual escalation of tensions between the two camps, and after the regime failed to coopt the movement, Gallego's tinny shack was torched. The priest refused to change course, however, and on June 9, 1971, he was arrested by National Guard agents at night, and "disappeared" thereafter. Expecting this turn of events, Héctor Gallego asked his followers earlier, "if I disappear, do not look for me. Keep fighting." The event marked the regime's first serious crisis as the Church organized massive protests nationwide, but by a combination of disinformation, intimidation, and negotiation, Torrijos managed to maneuver the opposition and further establish his leadership.

Today the political economy of the region is indeed changed. Partly in response to the movement's pressure, a road was paved to Santa Fe, further facilitating the region's integration into the national economy, and more resources were directed to the town. The cooperative has since known ups and downs, but has managed to diversify its economic activity, and now boasts a coffee roasting plant, and various agricultural activities. Its "Fundación Héctor Gallego" has represented peasants' interests, and has been trying to improve their technical skills. Equally important, the region has recently seen a modest tourist flow and an increase in real estate sales, and both have contributed to the rise of a small middle class in the town, further diversifying the local power structure, and perhaps contributing to its people's well-being.

== Gallery ==
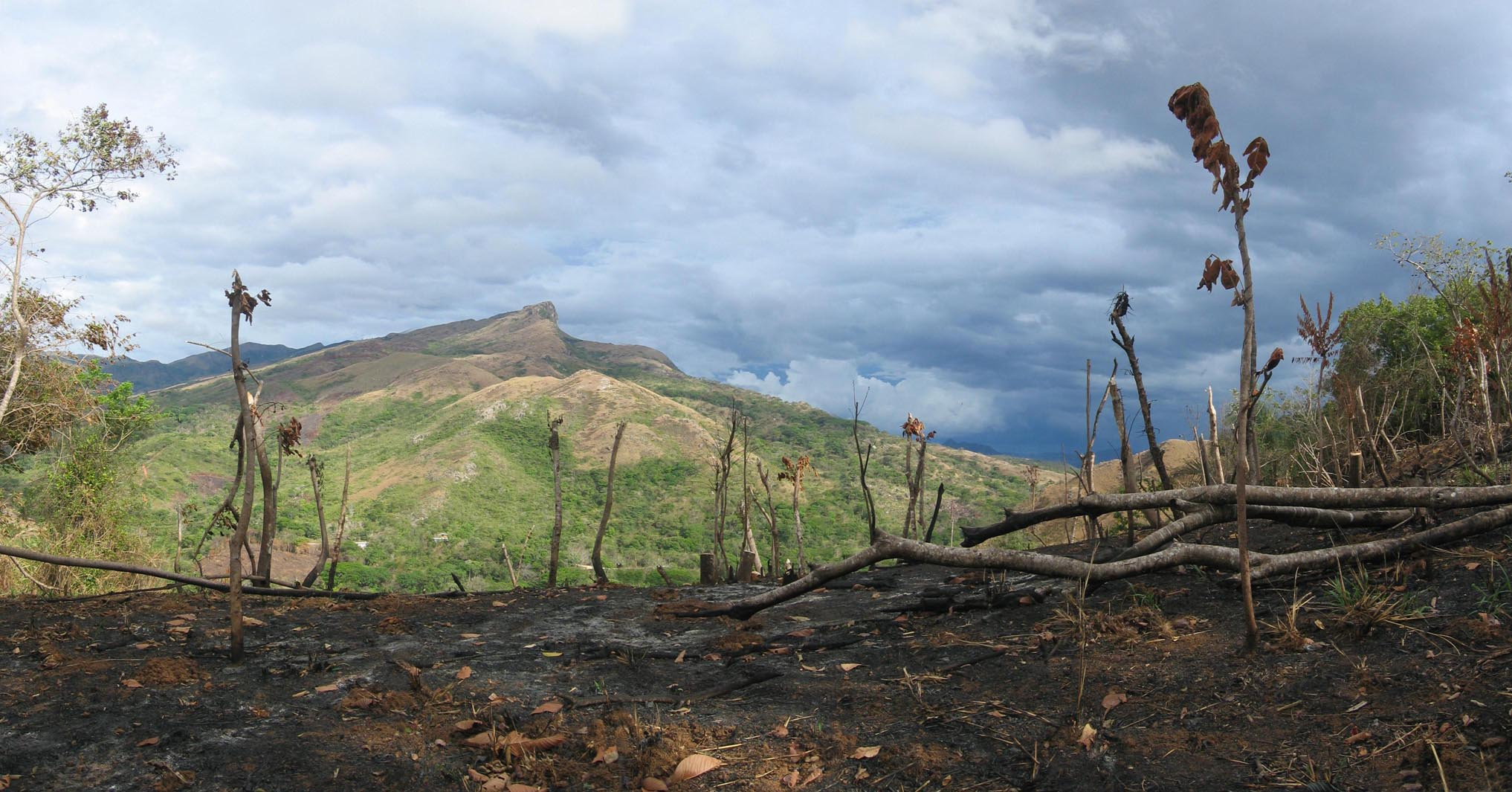
Some scorched earth on the crater rim to the south of Santa Fe

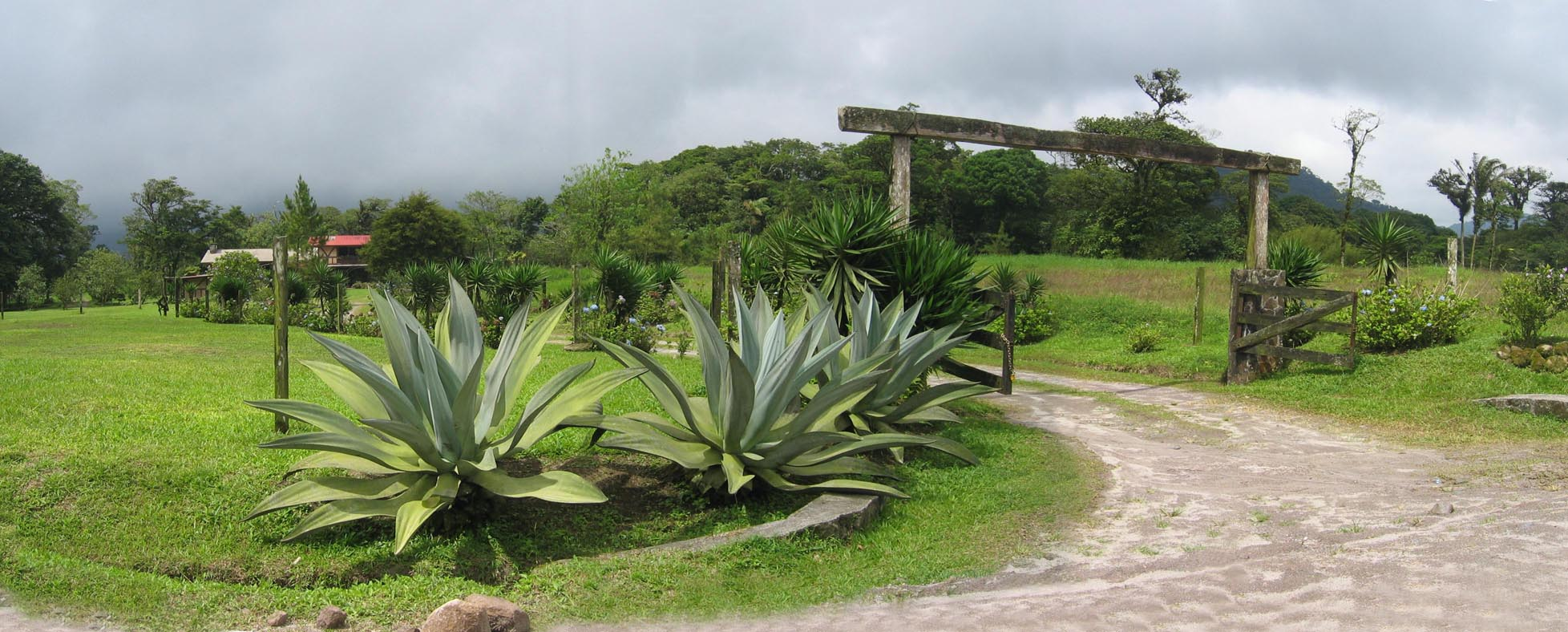
A farm gate on the crater rim to the east of Santa Fe

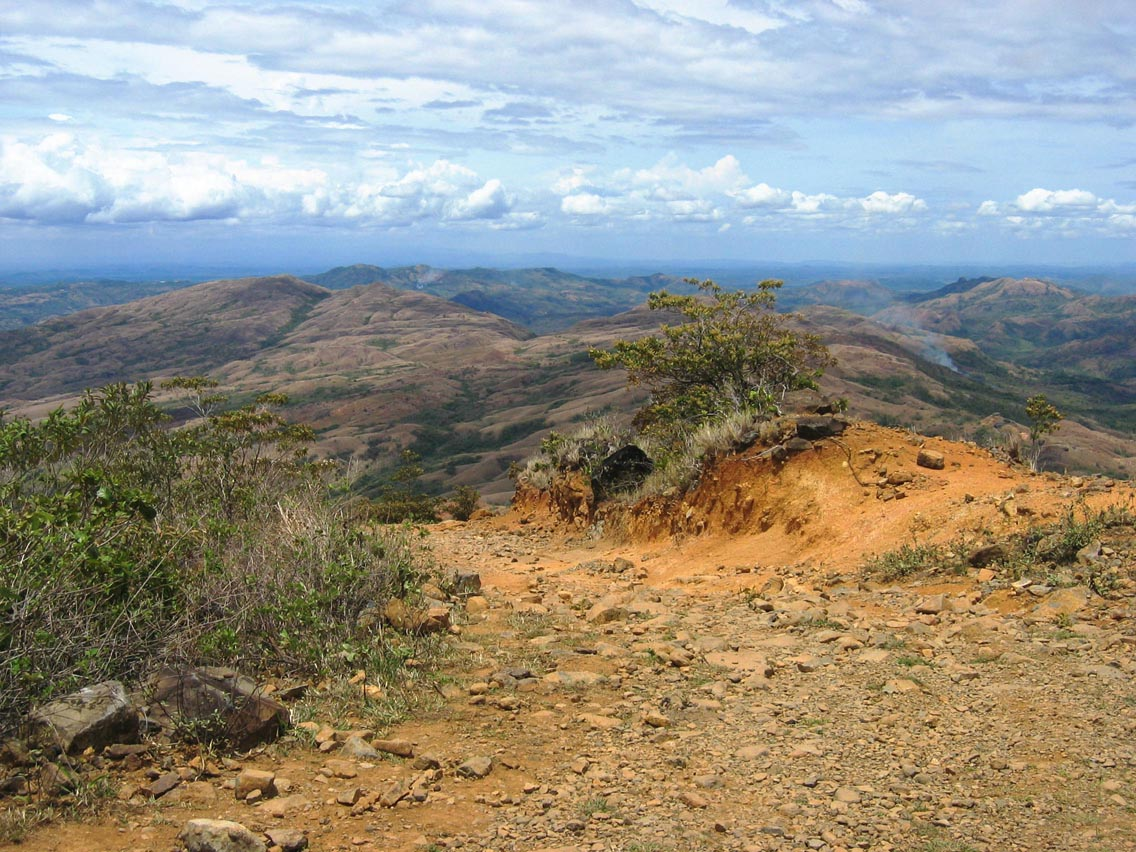
A view to the south from the southern crater rim

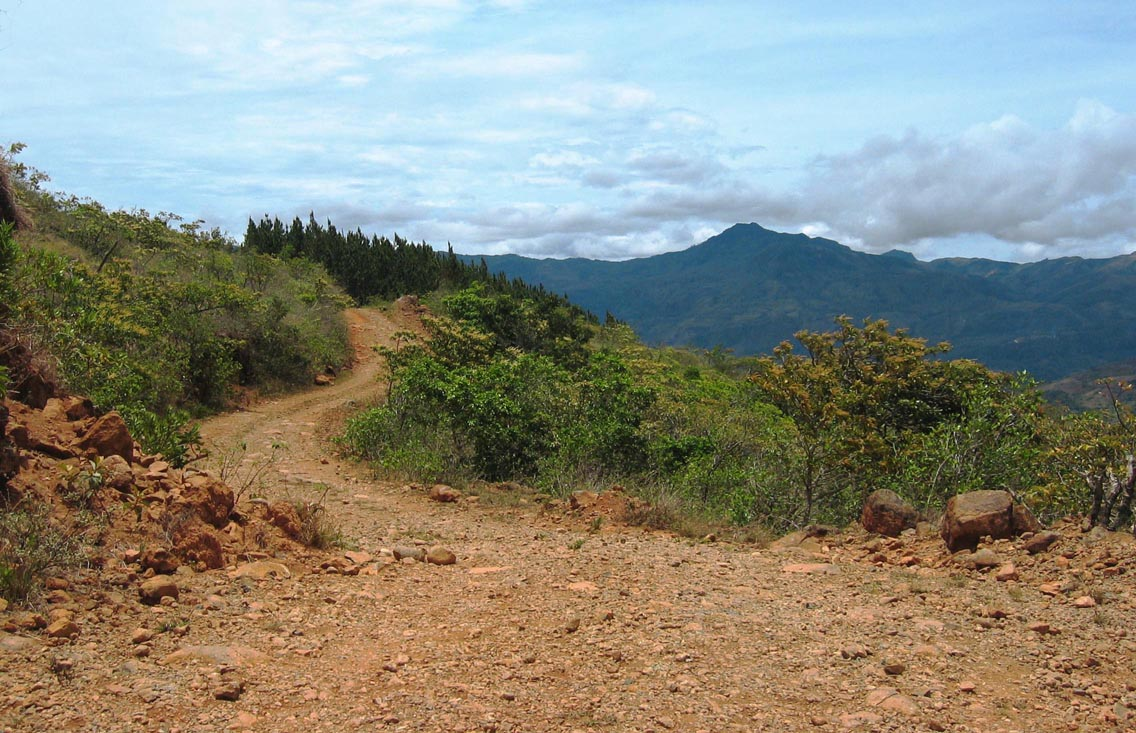
A view to the south from the southern crater rim

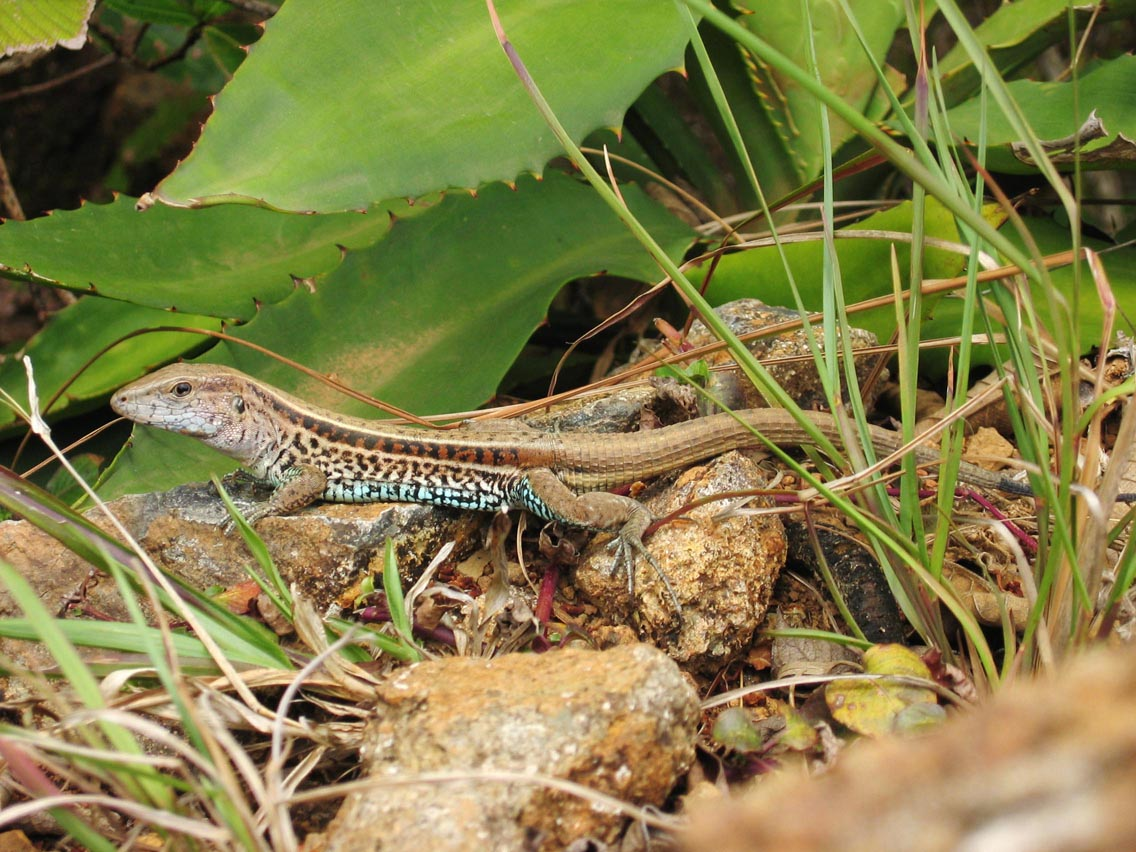
A lizard near Santa Fe

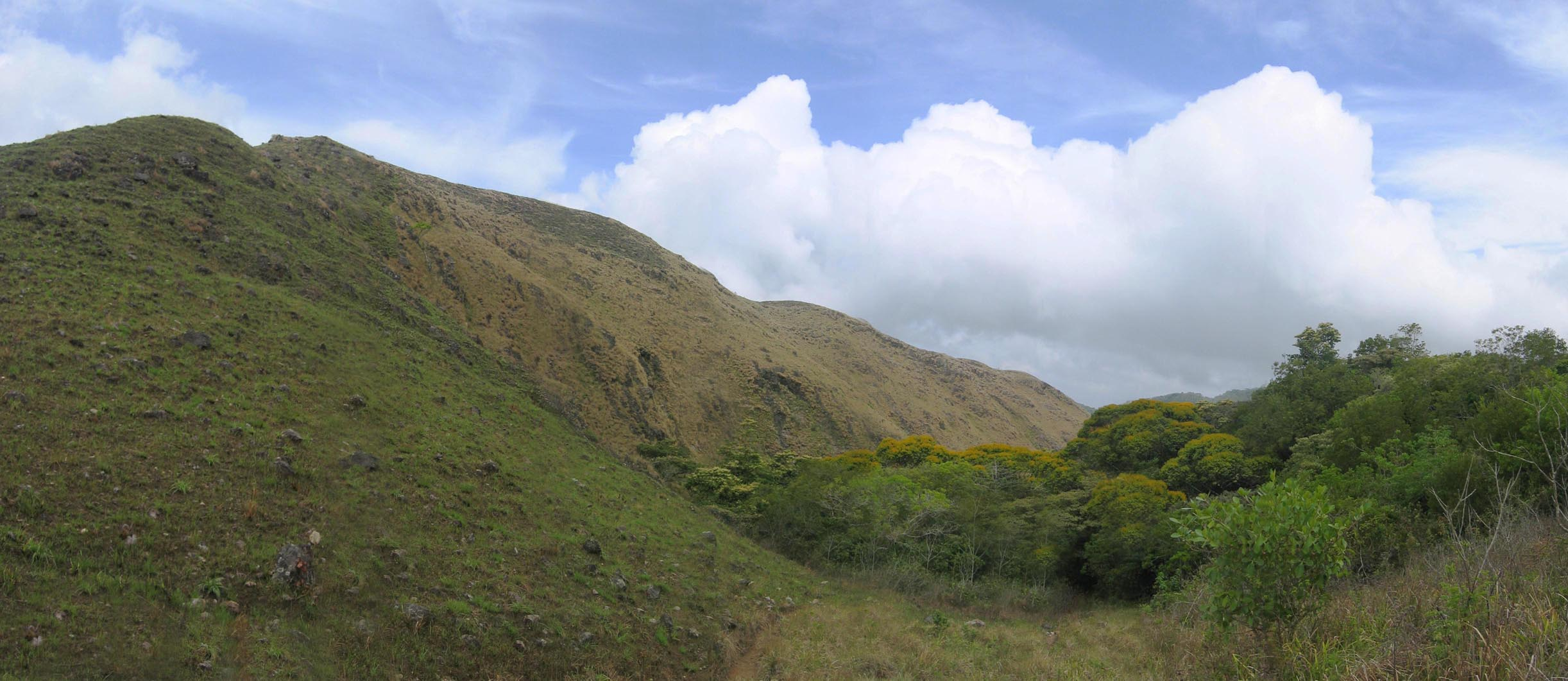
The crater rim to the north of Santa Fe

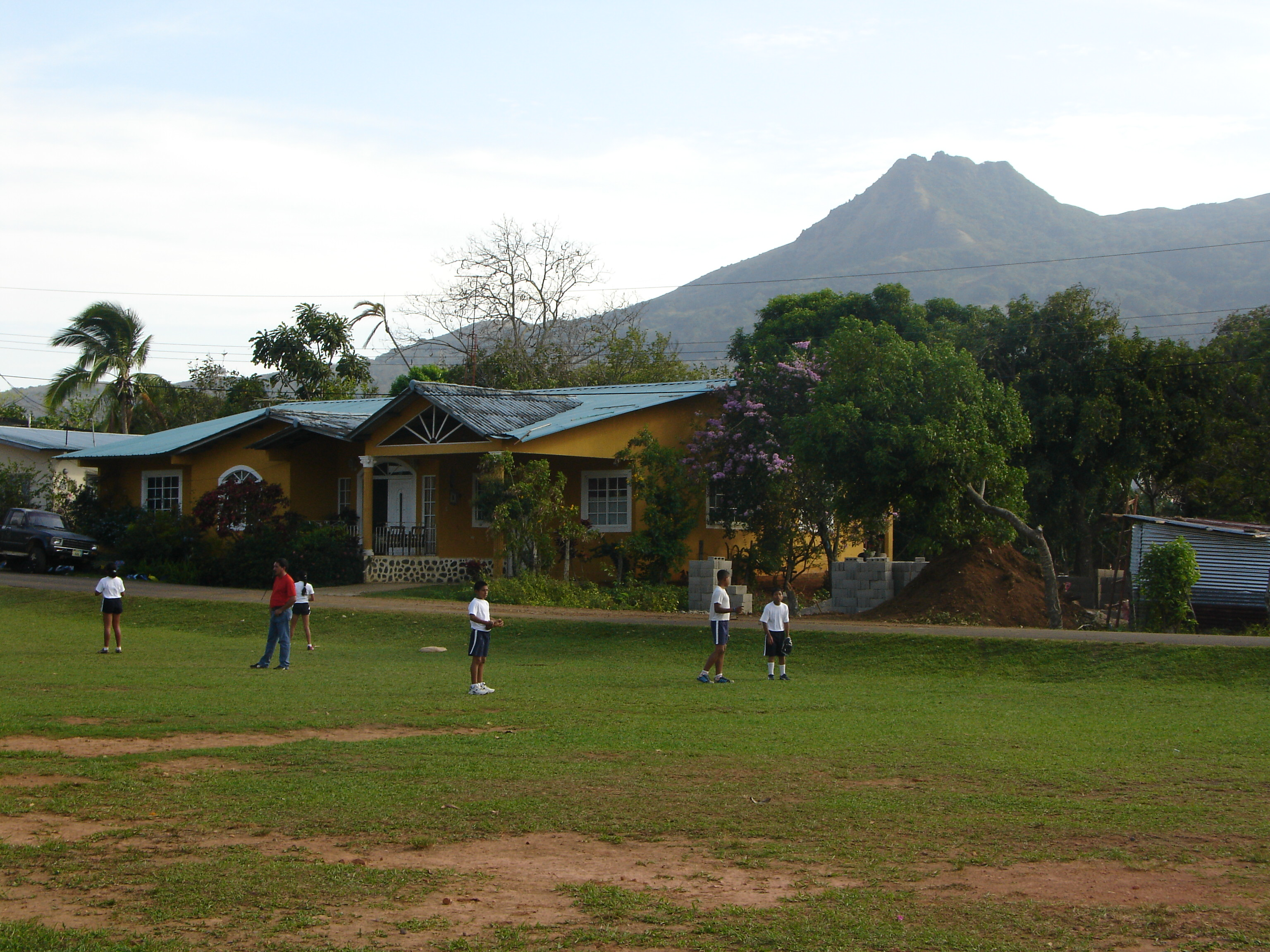
Mount El Tute, symbol of the little town

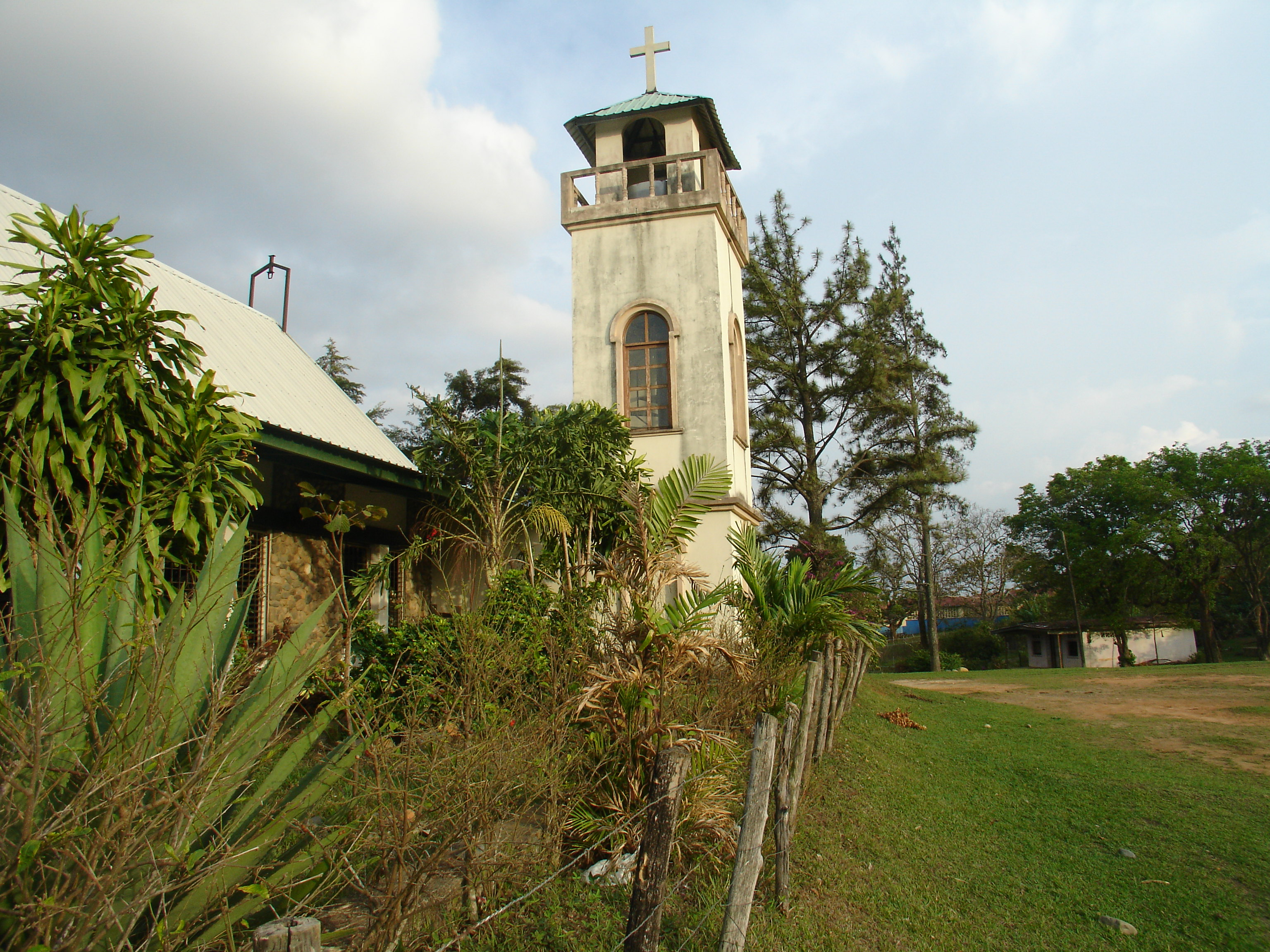
The church in the center of the village

== Administrative divisions ==
Santa Fe District is divided administratively into the following corregimientos:

- Santa Fe (capital)
- Calovébora
- El Alto
- El Cuay
- El Pantano
- Gatuncito
- Río Luis
- Rubén Cantú
