= Pocrí, Los Santos =

Pocrí
- Town and corregimiento
- Location within Panama
- Coordinates: 7°43′48″N 80°9′0″W
- Country: Panama
- Province: Los Santos
- District: Pocrí

Area
  - Land: 57.6 km^{2} (22.2 sq mi)

Population (2010)
  - Total: 1,002
  - Density: 17.4/km^{2} (45/sq mi)
- Population density calculated based on land area.
- Time zone: UTC−5 (EST)
- Climate: Aw

Pocrí is a town and corregimiento in Pocrí District, Los Santos Province, Panama with a population of 1,002 as of 2010. It is the seat of Pocrí District. Its population as of 1990 was 906; its population as of 2000 was 877.
