= Santa Catalina o Calovébora District =

Santa Catalina o Calovébora
- District
- Country: Panama
- Comarca indígena: Ngäbe-Buglé
- Sub-Region: Ño Kribo
- Capital: Santa Catalina o Calovébora
- Established: 10 May 2012

Population
  - Total: 7,821
- Time zone: UTC-5 (ETZ)

Santa Catalina o Calovébora District is a district (distrito) of Ngäbe-Buglé Comarca in Panama.

== Administrative divisions ==
Santa Catalina o Calovébora District is divided administratively into the following corregimientos:

- Alto Bilingüe
- Loma Yuca
- San Pedrito
- Santa Catalina o Calovébora
- Valle Bonito
