= Piedra Roja, Panama =

Coordinates: 8°34′N 81°45′W

Piedra Roja
- Corregimiento
- Interactive map of Piedra Roja
- Country: Panama
- Comarca Indígena: Ngäbe-Buglé Comarca
- District: Kankintú
- Time zone: UTC−5 (EST)

Piedra Roja is a corregimiento in Ngäbe-Buglé Comarca in the Republic of Panama.
