= Hato Pilón =

- Corregimiento
- Location within Panama
- Coordinates: 8°24′06″N 81°52′02″W
- Country: Panama
- Comarca Indígena: Ngäbe-Buglé Comarca
- District: Mironó
- Time zone: UTC−5 (EST)

Hato Pilón is a corregimiento in Ngäbe-Buglé Comarca in the Republic of Panama.
