= Mironó District =

Mironó
- District
- Country: Panama
- Comarca indígena: Ngäbe-Buglé
- Sub-Region: Nidrini
- Capital: Hato Pilón

Area
  - Total: 343.1 km^{2} (132.5 sq mi)

Population (2010)
  - Total: 15,010
  - Density: 43.75/km^{2} (113.3/sq mi)
- Time zone: UTC-5 (ETZ)

Mironó District is a district (distrito) of Ngäbe-Buglé Comarca in Panama.

== Administrative divisions ==
Mironó District is divided administratively into the following corregimientos:

- Cascabel
- Hato Corotú
- Hato Culantro
- Hato Jobo
- Hato Julí
- Hato Pilón
- Quebrada de Loro
- Salto Dupí
