= Besikó District =

Coordinates: 8.538°N 82.027°W

Besikó
- District
- Country: Panama
- Comarca indígena: Ngäbe-Buglé
- Sub-Region: Nidrini
- Capital: Soloy

Area
  - Total: 752.2 km^{2} (290.4 sq mi)

Population (2010)
  - Total: 23,532
  - Density: 31.28/km^{2} (81.03/sq mi)
- Time zone: UTC-5 (ETZ)

Besikó District is a district (distrito) of Ngäbe-Buglé Comarca in Panama.

== Administrative divisions ==
Besikó District is divided administratively into the following corregimientos:

- Boca de Balsa
- Cerro Banco
- Cerro de Patena
- Camarón Arriba
- Emplanada de Chorcha
- Nämnoní
- Niba
- Soloy
