= Soloy =

Coordinates: 8°30′N 82°04′W

- Corregimiento
- Interactive map of Soloy
- Country: Panama
- Comarca Indígena: Ngäbe-Buglé Comarca
- District: Besikó
- Time zone: UTC−5 (EST)

Soloy is a corregimiento in Ngäbe-Buglé Comarca in the Republic of Panama.
