= Samboa =

Coordinates: 8°49′N 82°01′W

- Corregimiento
- Interactive map of Samboa
- Country: Panama
- Comarca Indígena: Ngäbe-Buglé Comarca
- District: Jirondai
- Time zone: UTC−5 (EST)

Samboa is a corregimiento in Ngäbe-Buglé Comarca in the Republic of Panama.
