= Kankintú =

- Location within Panama
- Coordinates: 8°51′0″N 81°49′12″W
- Country: Panama
- Province: Ngöbe Buglé

Population (2008)
  - Total: 787

Kankintú is a town in the Ngöbe Buglé province of Panama.

== Sources ==
- World Gazeteer: Panama – World-Gazetteer.com
