= Ñürüm District =

Ñürüm
- District
- Country: Panama
- Comarca indígena: Ngäbe-Buglé
- Sub-Region: Kädridri
- Capital: Buenos Aires
- Established: 10 March 1997

Area
  - Total: 574.7 km^{2} (221.9 sq mi)

Population (2010)
  - Total: 13,172
  - Density: 22.92/km^{2} (59.36/sq mi)
- Time zone: UTC-5 (ETZ)

Ñürüm District is a district (distrito) of Ngäbe-Buglé Comarca in Panama. Ñürüm District contains six exclaves.

== Administrative divisions ==
Ñürüm District is divided administratively into the following corregimientos:

- Agua de Salud
- Alto de Jesús
- Buenos Aires
- Cerro Pelado
- El Bale
- El Paredón
- El Peñón
- El Piro
- El Piro N°2
- Guayabito
- Güibale
