= Müna District =

Coordinates: 8.44443°N 81.62595°W

Müna
- District
- Country: Panama
- Comarca indígena: Ngäbe-Buglé
- Sub-Region: Kädridri
- Capital: Chichica

Area
  - Total: 796.4 km^{2} (307.5 sq mi)

Population (2010)
  - Total: 36,075
  - Density: 45.30/km^{2} (117.3/sq mi)
- Time zone: UTC-5 (ETZ)

Müna District is a district (distrito) of Ngäbe-Buglé Comarca in Panama. Müna District contains two exclaves.

== Administrative divisions ==
Müna District is divided administratively into the following corregimientos:

- Alto Caballero
- Bagama
- Cerro Caña
- Cerro Puerco
- Chichica
- Dikeri
- Diko
- Kikari
- Krüa
- Maraca
- Mreeni
- Nibra
- Peña Blanca
- Roka
- Sitio Prado
- Umaní
