= Kusapín =

Kusapín (Kingsville)
- Location within Panama
- Coordinates: 9°10′48″N 81°53′24″W
- Country: Panama
- Province: Ngöbe Buglé

Population (2010)
  - Total: 33,121 hab.

Kusapín (Saborikäte ) is a district of the county Panamanian indigenous Ngabe Bugle. Its capital is the town of Kusapín. It has an area of 1,693.2 km^{2} (653.7 sq mi) and a population of 33,121 inhabitants according to 2010 census data. The district's population is predominantly ethnic Ngobe Bugle.

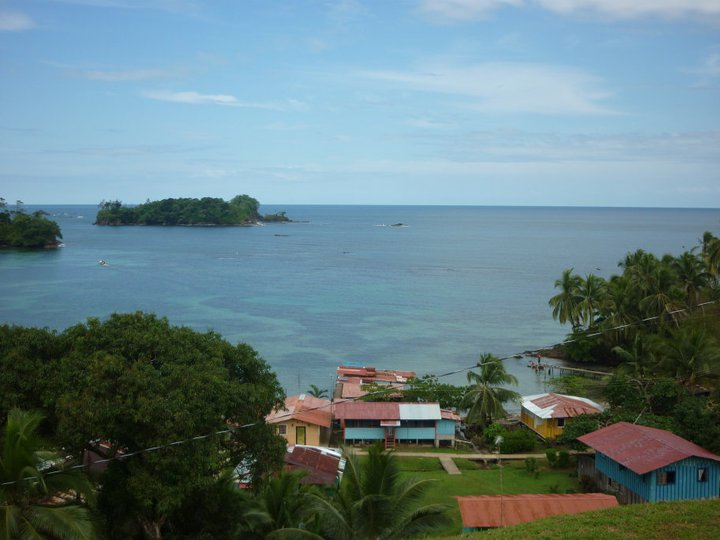
Kusapin view from one of its beautiful hills

== Political division ==
The district includes the communities of Kusapín, Blue Bay, Santa Catalina, Yucca Loma, Rio Chiriquí, Tobabe and Llano Bonito.

== History ==
The district is created Kusapín from Law 10 of March 1997. Next to the district Kankintú, is part of the region in Ñokribu Ngobe Bugle.

== Getting there? ==
Being located in the coastal regions of the province of Bocas del Toro, is necessary to travel by boat. These depart daily at 6:00 am and arrive at the port of Chiriqui Grande from 8 to 9 am, depending on weather conditions. Leaving the port to Kusapín at 11:00 am, drivers reliable as Rutilio Mr. Trotman, Roger Hooker, Chalito, Yimmi.

== Sources ==
- World Gazeteer: Panama – World-Gazetteer.com
