= Santa Fe, Veraguas =

Santa Fe de Veraguas
- Town
- Interactive map of Santa Fe de Veraguas
- Location within Panama
- Coordinates: 8°30′45″N 81°04′43″W
- Country: Panama
- Province: Veraguas
- Founded: ~ 1560

Area
  - Land: 145.1 km^{2} (56.0 sq mi)
- Elevation: 430 m (1,410 ft)

Population (2010)
  - Total: 3,047
  - Density: 21/km^{2} (54/sq mi)
- Population density calculated based on land area.
- Time zone: UTC−5 (EST)
- Climate: Am

Santa Fe is the name of the capital of the Santa Fe District in the province of Veraguas in Panama. It has a population of 3200 and lies at an altitude of about 430m. Santa Fe lies close to the continental divide and just 60 km from the Mosquito Gulf at the Caribbean Sea, but is only connected to the Pacific coast with a paved road to the Pan-American Highway and the city of Santiago de Veraguas.

Santa Fe is known throughout Panama for its natural environment. The Santa Fe national park surrounds the town in three directions, measuring 72.636 hectares. The park is home to at least 300 bird species, 300 species of orchids and rare flora and fauna. The Santa Maria River and its tributaries spring from the park. The air quality and forests make the area a popular tourist destination for outdoor activities such as hiking and bird watching.

== History ==
After the Spanish conquests in the Americas, what is now the province of Veraguas was awarded to Columbus’ grandson Luís, who launched several expeditions to subdue the native population and firmly establish control. He sold his rights back to the Spanish crown after the attempts proved unsuccessful. The Spanish crown then established the Province of Veragua and made the Spanish captain Francisco Vázquez, survivor of a dramatic El Dorado expedition, its first governor in 1560. Santa Fe was founded around that time for the purpose of gold mining.

Very little is known about its early days; the town remained isolated until the 1950s, when rebels tried to instigate a Cuba-like revolution in the area. By that time Santa Fe had become dominated by a few powerful families who controlled most of the resources in the valley. Contact with the outside world was severely limited because of the absence of any paved roads, which made it impossible to travel to the much bigger town of Santiago during most of the year.

The situation started to change with the arrival from Colombia of a Catholic priest by the name of Jesús Héctor Gallego Herrera in 1967. Gallego began to organize the peasants into cooperatives, thus bypassing the monopolies of the town's elite. By 1971 his popular peasant movement had grown well outside the boundaries of Santa Fe, and Gallego was viewed as an adversary by the country's populist dictator, Omar Torrijos. With the help of one of the local families, Gallego was arrested one night and "disappeared".

However, Santa Fe got connected by road in 1971, and the cooperative founded by Héctor Gallego continues to function until this day.

== Climate ==
Climate data for Santa Fe (2001–2015 normals, extremes 1956–2015)
Month	Jan	Feb	Mar	Apr	May	Jun	Jul	Aug	Sep	Oct	Nov	Dec	Year
Record high °C (°F)	33.0 (91.4)	34.5 (94.1)	35.0 (95.0)	35.8 (96.4)	35.4 (95.7)	36.0 (96.8)	33.0 (91.4)	32.5 (90.5)	32.8 (91.0)	33.0 (91.4)	32.6 (90.7)	32.6 (90.7)	36.0 (96.8)
Mean daily maximum °C (°F)	27.5 (81.5)	28.2 (82.8)	28.8 (83.8)	29.6 (85.3)	29.7 (85.5)	29.5 (85.1)	29.0 (84.2)	29.3 (84.7)	29.7 (85.5)	29.0 (84.2)	28.2 (82.8)	28.0 (82.4)	28.9 (84.0)
Daily mean °C (°F)	24.1 (75.4)	24.4 (75.9)	24.9 (76.8)	25.4 (77.7)	25.5 (77.9)	25.3 (77.5)	25.1 (77.2)	25.2 (77.4)	25.2 (77.4)	24.9 (76.8)	24.5 (76.1)	24.5 (76.1)	24.9 (76.9)
Mean daily minimum °C (°F)	20.7 (69.3)	20.6 (69.1)	20.9 (69.6)	21.3 (70.3)	21.4 (70.5)	21.1 (70.0)	21.2 (70.2)	21.0 (69.8)	20.8 (69.4)	20.8 (69.4)	20.9 (69.6)	21.0 (69.8)	21.0 (69.7)
Record low °C (°F)	15.0 (59.0)	10.0 (50.0)	12.4 (54.3)	16.2 (61.2)	16.0 (60.8)	17.0 (62.6)	16.5 (61.7)	16.0 (60.8)	13.4 (56.1)	15.5 (59.9)	16.0 (60.8)	13.2 (55.8)	10.0 (50.0)
Average rainfall mm (inches)	56.8 (2.24)	25.2 (0.99)	33.4 (1.31)	72.5 (2.85)	241.2 (9.50)	259.3 (10.21)	204.7 (8.06)	267.2 (10.52)	339.1 (13.35)	341.2 (13.43)	241.3 (9.50)	116.8 (4.60)	2,198.7 (86.56)
Source 1: INEC
Source 2: IMHPA

== Gallery ==
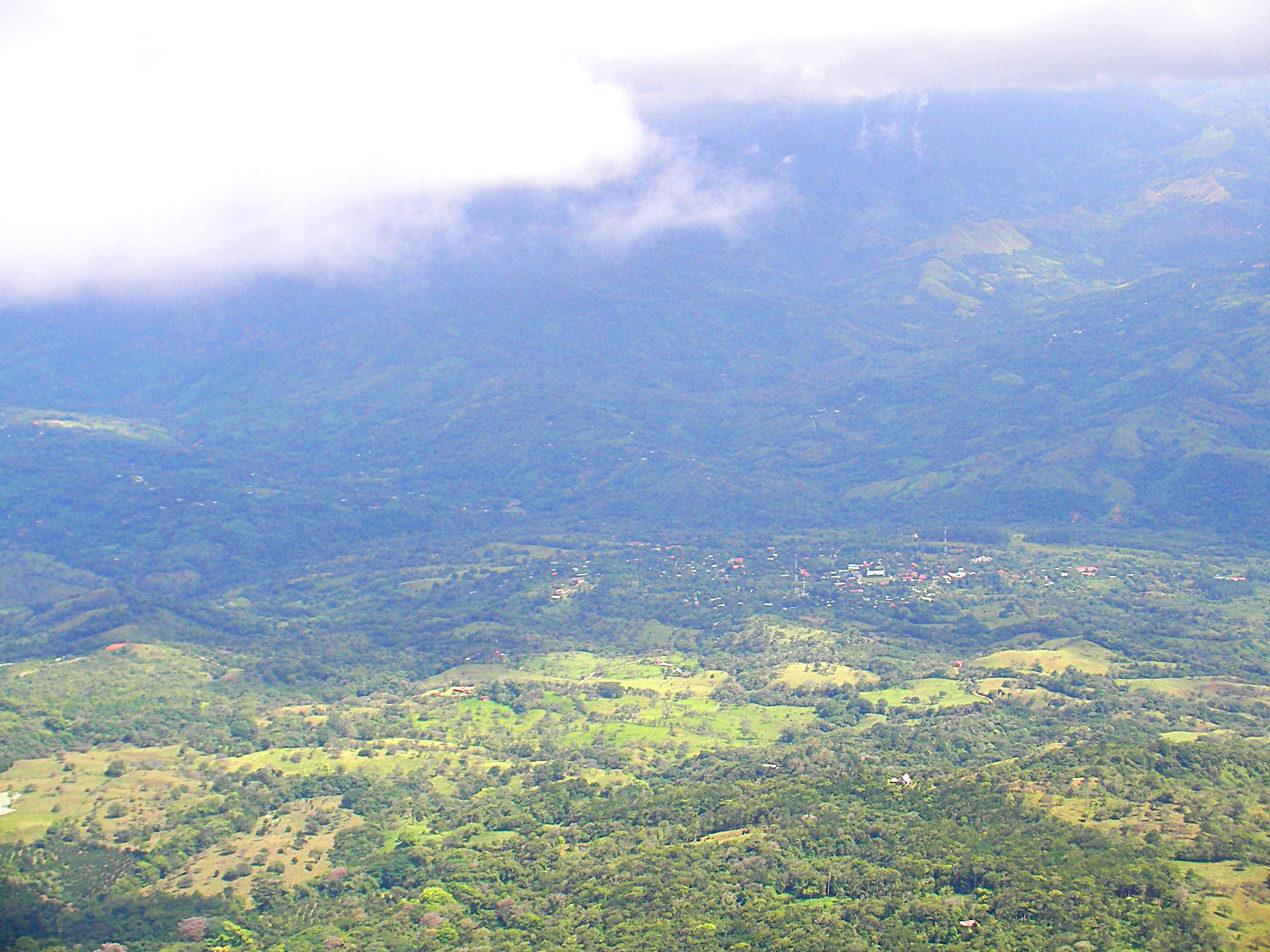
Over 1400 meters, Cerro Mariposa is one of the highest peaks near Santa Fe offering an excellent view of the town and its surroundings

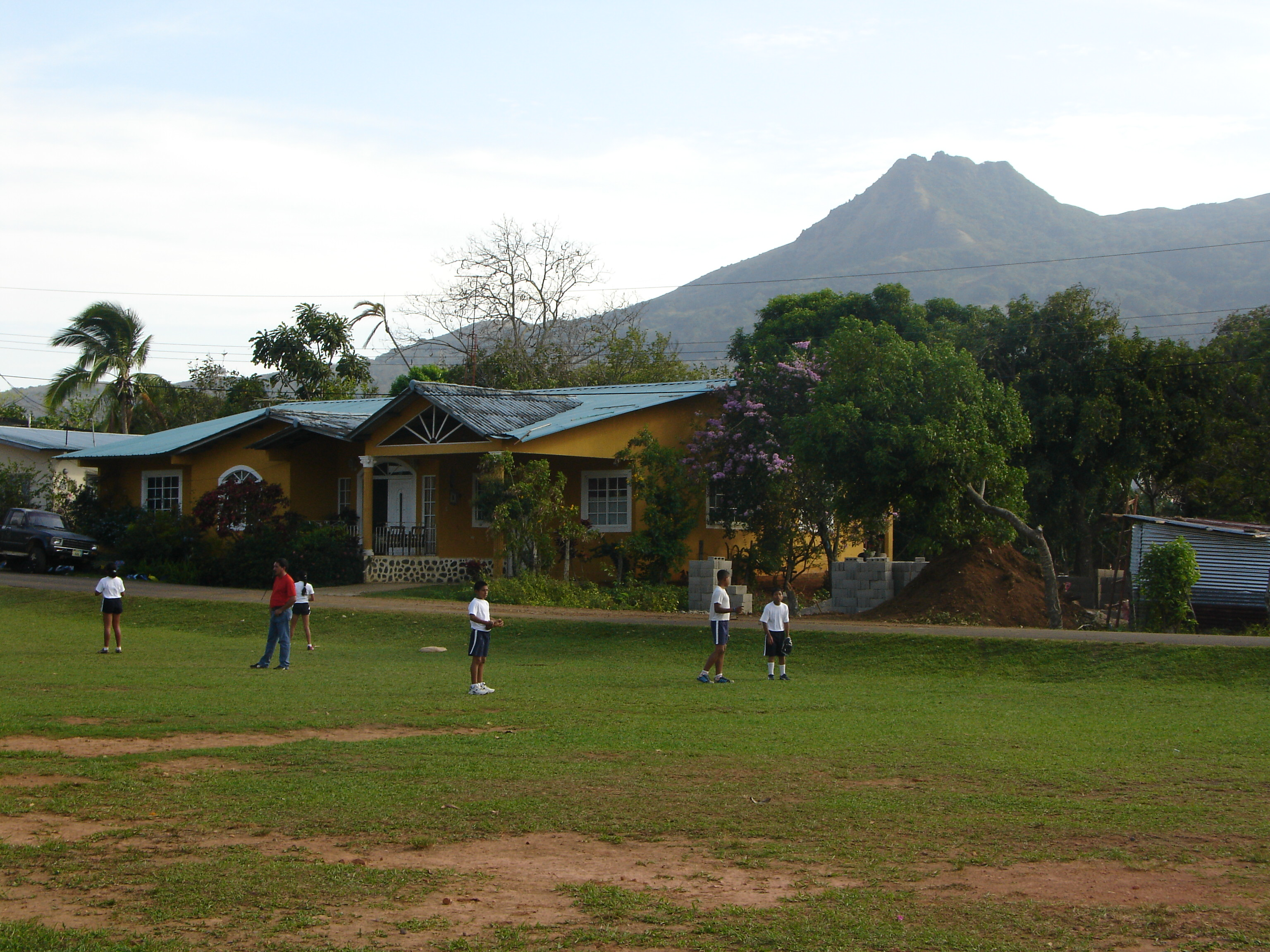
Mount El Tute, symbol of the little town

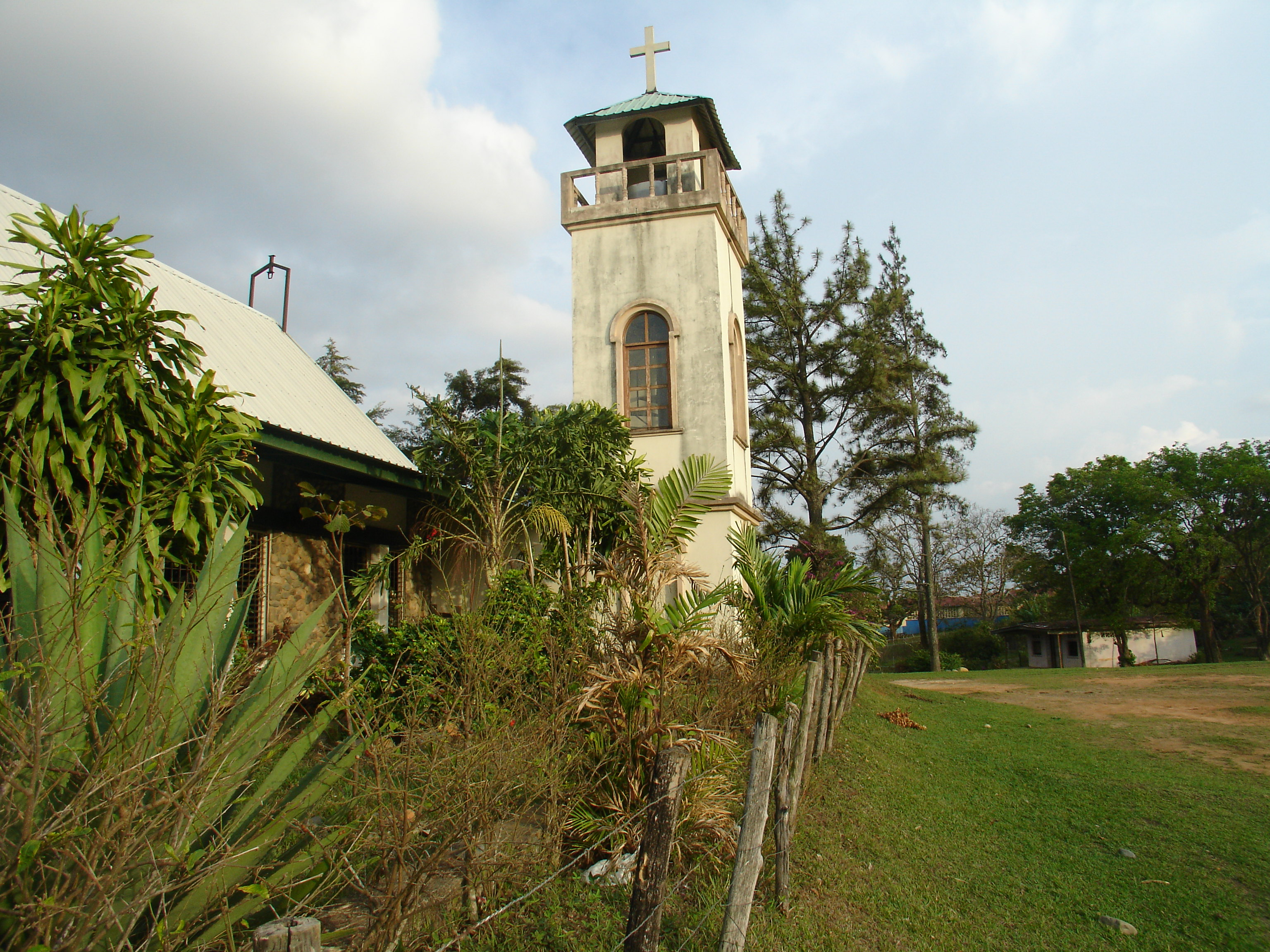
The church in the center of the village

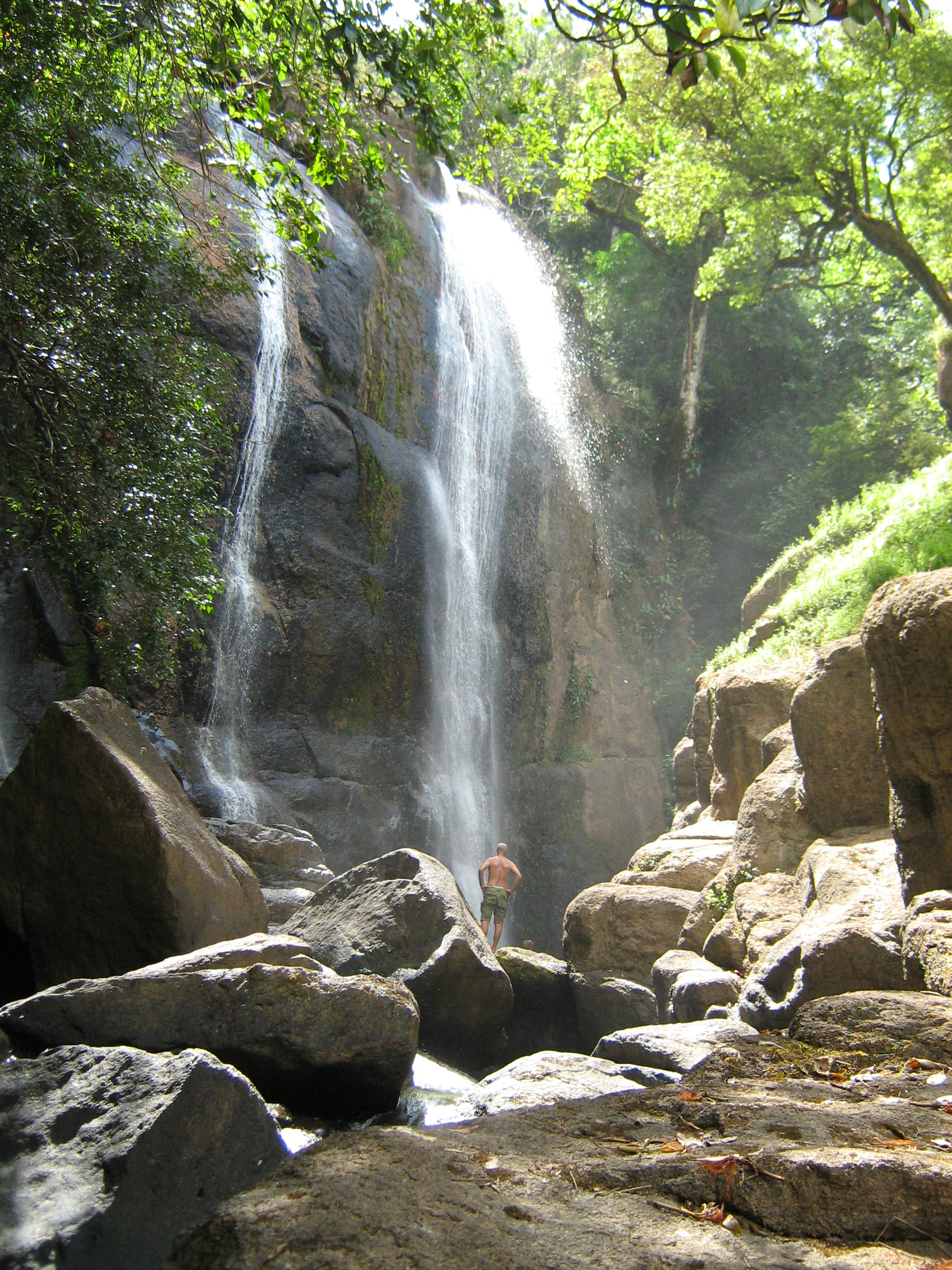
The hamlet of El Salto is about 10 kilometres from Santa Fe, in de Al Alto sub-district

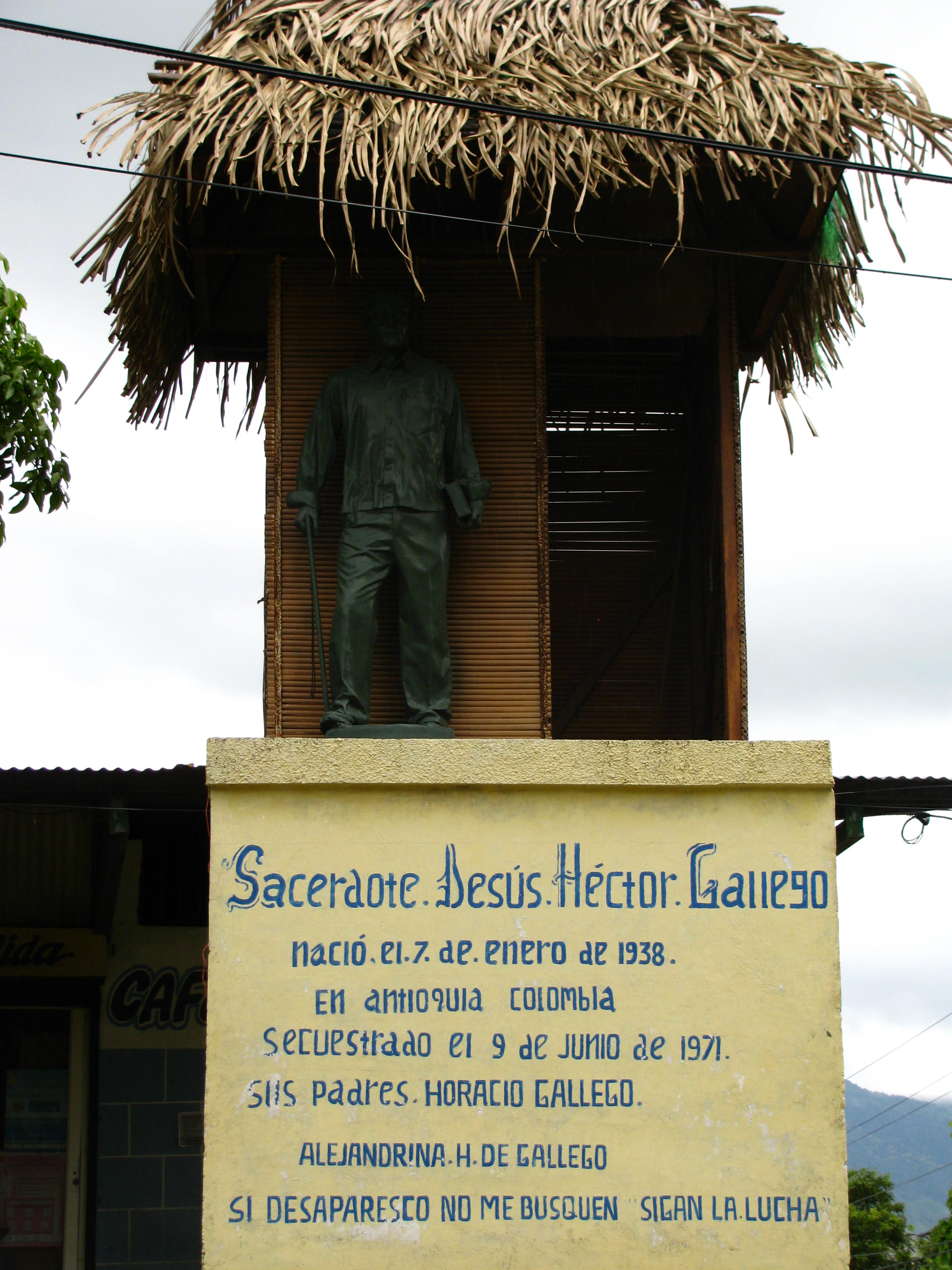
Hectór Gallego, a priest who resisted local elites and was eventually killed by Omar Torrijos

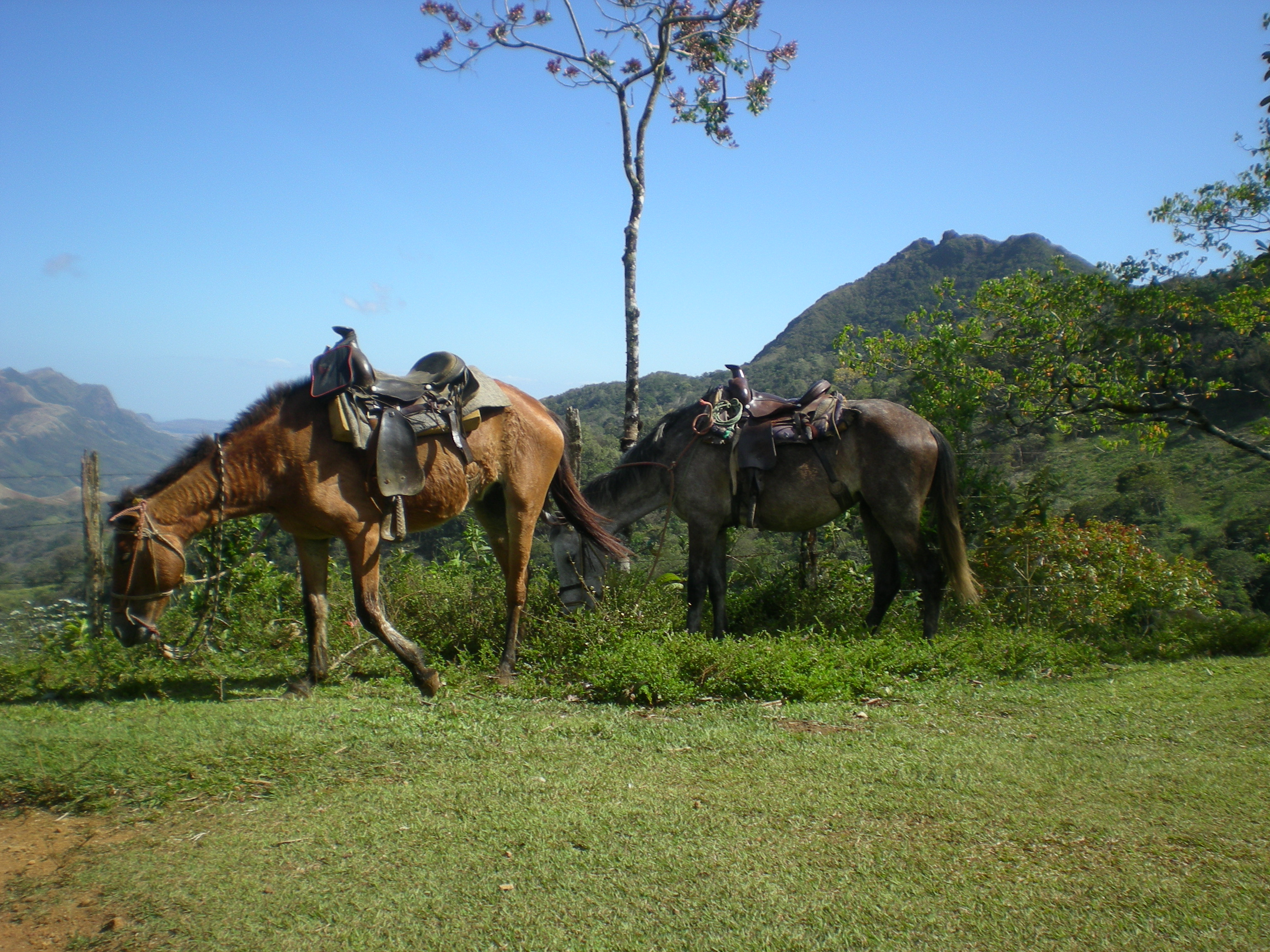
Iconic Cerro Tute mountain seen from Las Brujas near Santa Fe

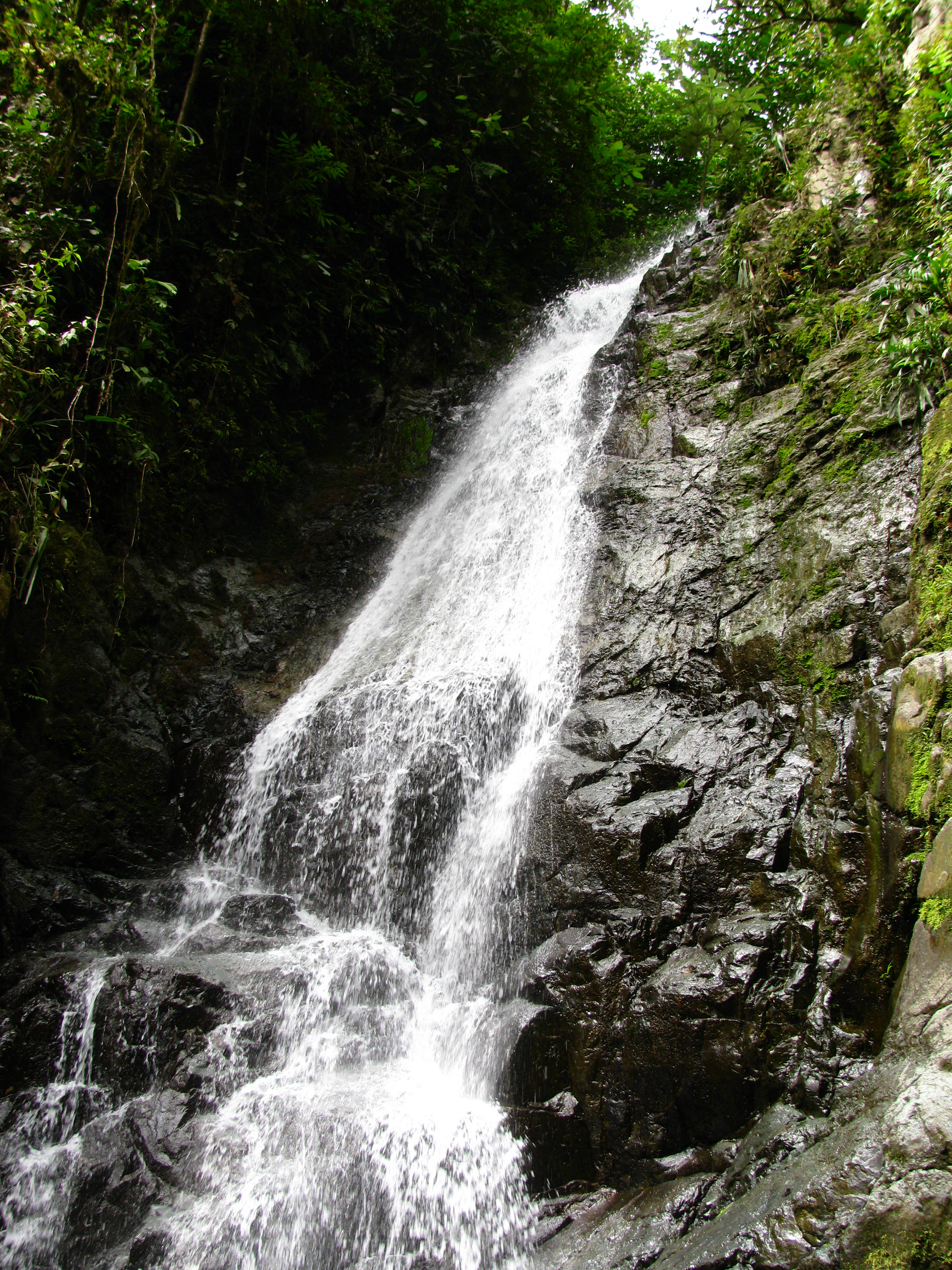
A small waterfall located near Alto de Piedra, on the road from Santa Fe to Guabal
