= Bisira =

- Location within Panama
- Coordinates: 8°54′0″N 81°51′36″W
- Country: Panama
- Comarca Cricamola: Ngöbe Buglé Comarca

Population (2008)
  - Total: 1 019

Bisira is a town in the Ngöbe Buglé Comarca of Panama. It is located in the north east part of the country by the beach.

== Sources ==
- World Gazeteer: Panama – World-Gazetteer.com
