= Ngäbe-Buglé Comarca =

Indigenous region of Panama

Coordinates: 8°46′11″N 81°44′02″W

Ngäbe-Buglé Comarca Comarca Ngäbe-Buglé Kätärä Teri Ngäbe Bugle
- Comarca indígena
- Flag

- Established: 1997
- Capital: Llano Tugrí
- Subdivisions: 9 Districts: Besiko; Jirondai; Kankintú; Kusapín; Mirono; Münä; Nole Duima; Ñürün; Bledeshia

Government
  - Body: Tribal Council
  - Cacique: Silvia Carrera

Area
  - Total: 6,968 km^{2} (2,690 sq mi)

Population (2023 census)
  - Total: 212,084
  - Density: 30.44/km^{2} (78.83/sq mi)

GDP (PPP, constant 2015 values)
  - Year: 2023
  - Total: $700 million
  - Per capita: $3,200
- Time zone: UTC-5
- ISO 3166 code: PA-NB
- HDI (2017): 0.560 medium

Ngäbe-Buglé (Spanish: [ˈŋɡoβe βuˈɣle]) is the largest and most populous of Panama's six comarcas indígenas. It was created in 1997 from lands formerly belonging to the provinces of Bocas del Toro, Chiriquí, and Veraguas. The capital is known as Buäbiti in Ngäbere and Llano Tugrí in Spanish.

== Administrative divisions ==
Ngäbe-Buglé Comarca is sub-divided into 3 sub-regions, 9 districts and 70 corregimientos:

District	Corregimientos (Subdivisions)	Cabecera (Seat)
Ño Kribo
Kankintú District	Bisira, Kankintú, Guoroní, Mününí, Piedra Roja, Calante, Tolote	Bisira
Kusapín District	Kusapín, Bahía Azul, Cañaveral, Río Chiriquí, Tobobé	Kusapín
Jirondai District	Samboa, Büri, Guariviara, Man Creek, Tuwai	Samboa
Santa Catalina o Calovébora District	Bledeshia, Alto Bilingüe, Loma Yuca, San Pedrito, Valle Bonito	Santa Catalina o Calovébora (Bledeshia)
Nidrini
Besikó District	Soloy, Boca de Balsa, Cerro Banco, Cerro de Patena, Camarón Arriba, Emplanada de Chorcha, Nämnoní, Niba	Soloy
Mironó District	Hato Pilón, Cascabel, Hato Corotú, Hato Culantro, Hato Jobo, Hato Julí, Quebrada de Loro, Salto Dupí	Hato Pilón
Nole Duima District	Cerro Iglesias, Lajero, Hato Chamí, Susama, Jädaberi	Cerro Iglesias
Kädridri
Müna District	Chichica, Alto Caballero, Bagama, Cerro Caña, Cerro Puerco, Krüa, Maraca, Nibra, Peña Blanca, Roka, Sitio Prado, Umaní, Diko, Kikari, Dikeri, Mreeni	Chichica
Ñürüm District	Buenos Aires, Agua de Salud, Alto de Jesús, Cerro Pelado, El Bale, El Paredón, El Piro, Guayabito, Güibale, El Peñón, El Piro Nº2	Buenos Aires

== History ==
Starting in 1972, the Panamanian government was required to establish comarcas, demarcated regions in which Indigenous groups possess exclusive land rights and considerable administrative autonomy. Within comarcas, people elect a General assembly, governor, and any number of regional and local leaders, although the government still controls public expenditure and tax revenues within the territory. The comarca Ngäbe-Buglé, located in north western Panama, was formed in 1997 both as a latent result of government promise and of considerable political pressure from the Ngäbe-Buglé, united by threats of natural resource exploitation and environmental degradation on their ancestral lands. The territory is made up of land previously belonging to the provinces of Bocas del Toro, Chiriquí, and Veraguas, and divided into seven districts (listed above with capitals); the capital of the entire comarca is Büäbti, located in the Müna district. As the Ngäbe-Buglé population tends to identify more with their communities than with an ethnicity and is distributed rather unevenly, the political organization that prompted the formation of their comarca is fairly unusual, but nonetheless demonstrates a powerful capacity to influence government actions.

== Physical geography and climate ==
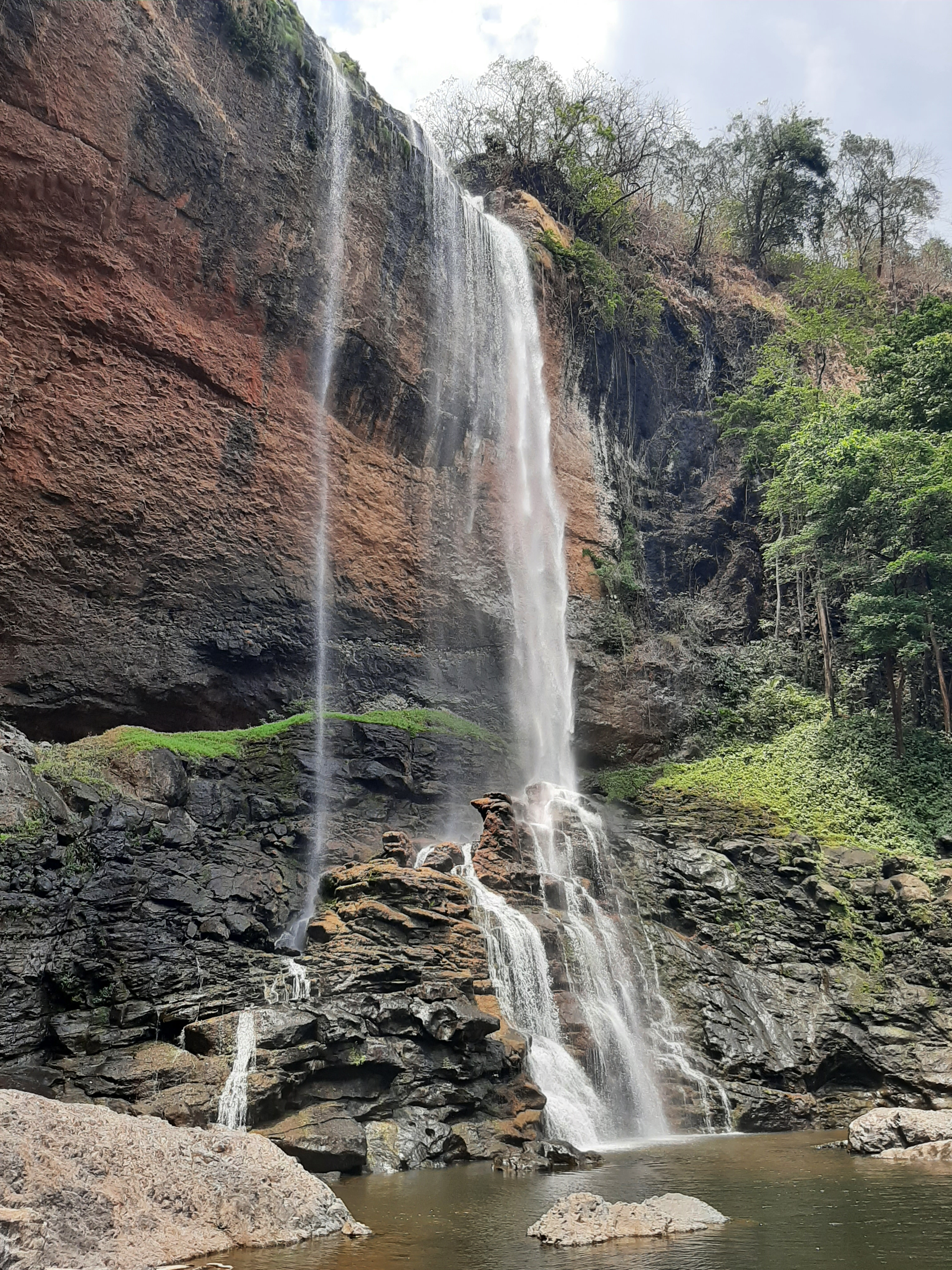
Kiki Waterfall

Ngäbe-Buglé comarca is characterized by mountainous terrain, steep slopes and generally nutrient poor soil with high rock content, all characteristics that make farming difficult. On the Caribbean slope there is no dry season and tropical forest dominates the landscape; on the Pacific slope there is a windy dry season (December to April) and a wet season. As a result of greater seasonal variation, there are more localized geographies on the Pacific slope and vegetation consists of grasses mixed with tropical forest cover. Small perennial streams and larger rivers run on both sides of the continental divide and are used for bathing, laundry, and drinking. In the region most travel is done on foot or horseback as there are few year-round access roads leading into the comarca (the first ever starting out as a mine access road that runs up to Buäbti and continues to Escopeta, the location of the Cerro Colorado mine) from San Felix, a city connected to the interamericana highway via Las Cruces.

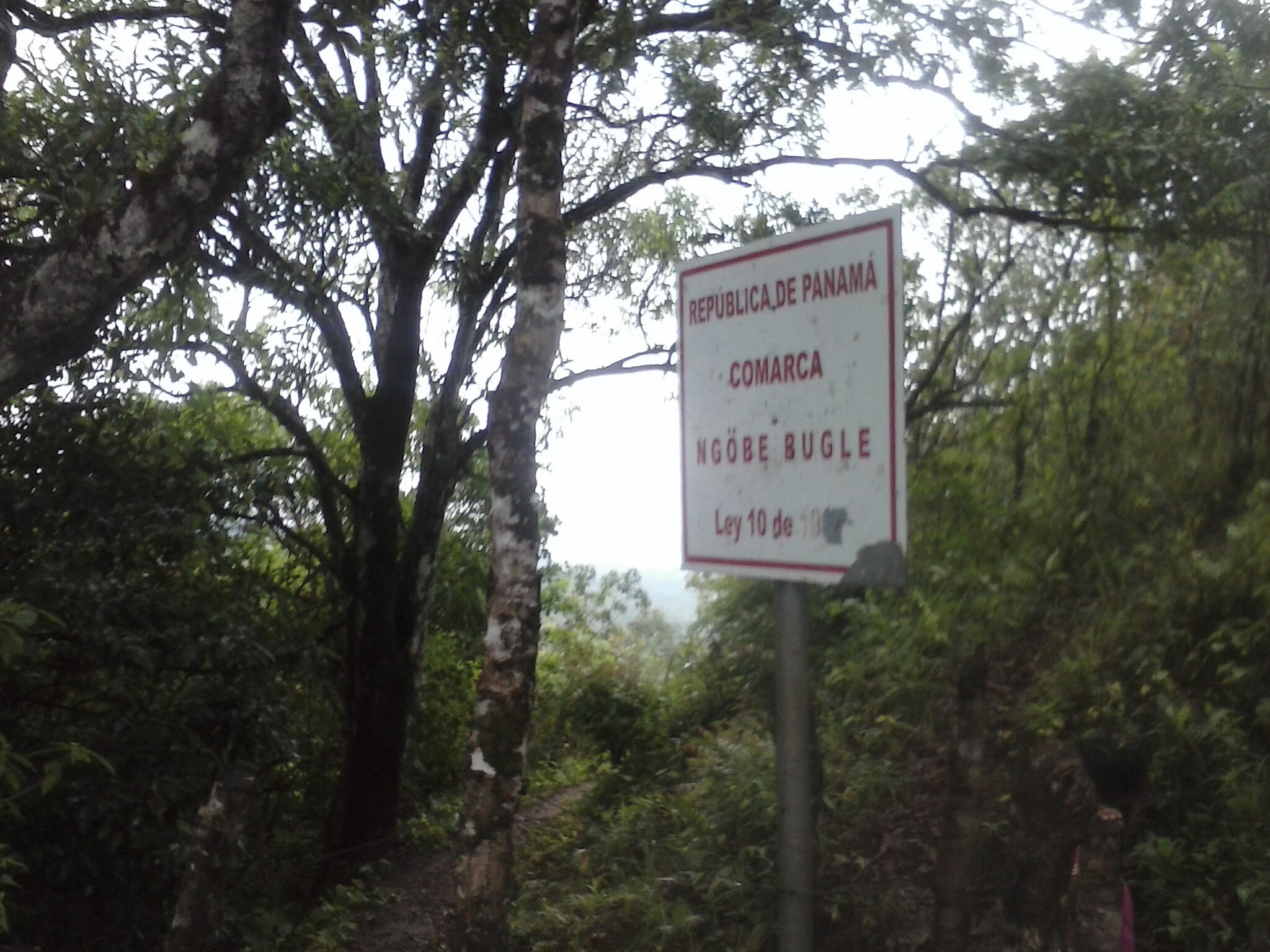

== Cultural groups ==
Although closely associated and collectively referred to as the Guaymí, their colonial name, the name Ngäbe-Buglé is now preferred. The Ngäbe and Buglé are two separate linguistic/Indigenous groups whose languages are mutually unintelligible. The larger group, the Ngäbe, speak Ngäbere, while the smaller group, the Buglé, speak Buglére; both are members of the Chibchan language family. Collectively, these two groups make up the largest Indigenous population in Panama. Note the difference in spelling of Ngäbe and Ngöbe; the two variations depend on local dialects. The vowel low-back-rounded sound indicated by ä does not exist in Spanish and is confused with "o", which is sometimes further hyperforeignised as "ö". The sound represented by "ä" is [ɔ], similar to the sound "aw" in the word "saw". The spelling Ngäbe, used here, is the more widely spread and correct spelling in Ngäbere.

== Daily life ==
The Ngäbe-Bugle generally live in houses supported by sticks with a grass or zinc roof and dirt floor, wealthier families may have a cement floor. In each house a platform under the roof is used for food storage and there are a number of raised bed platforms.

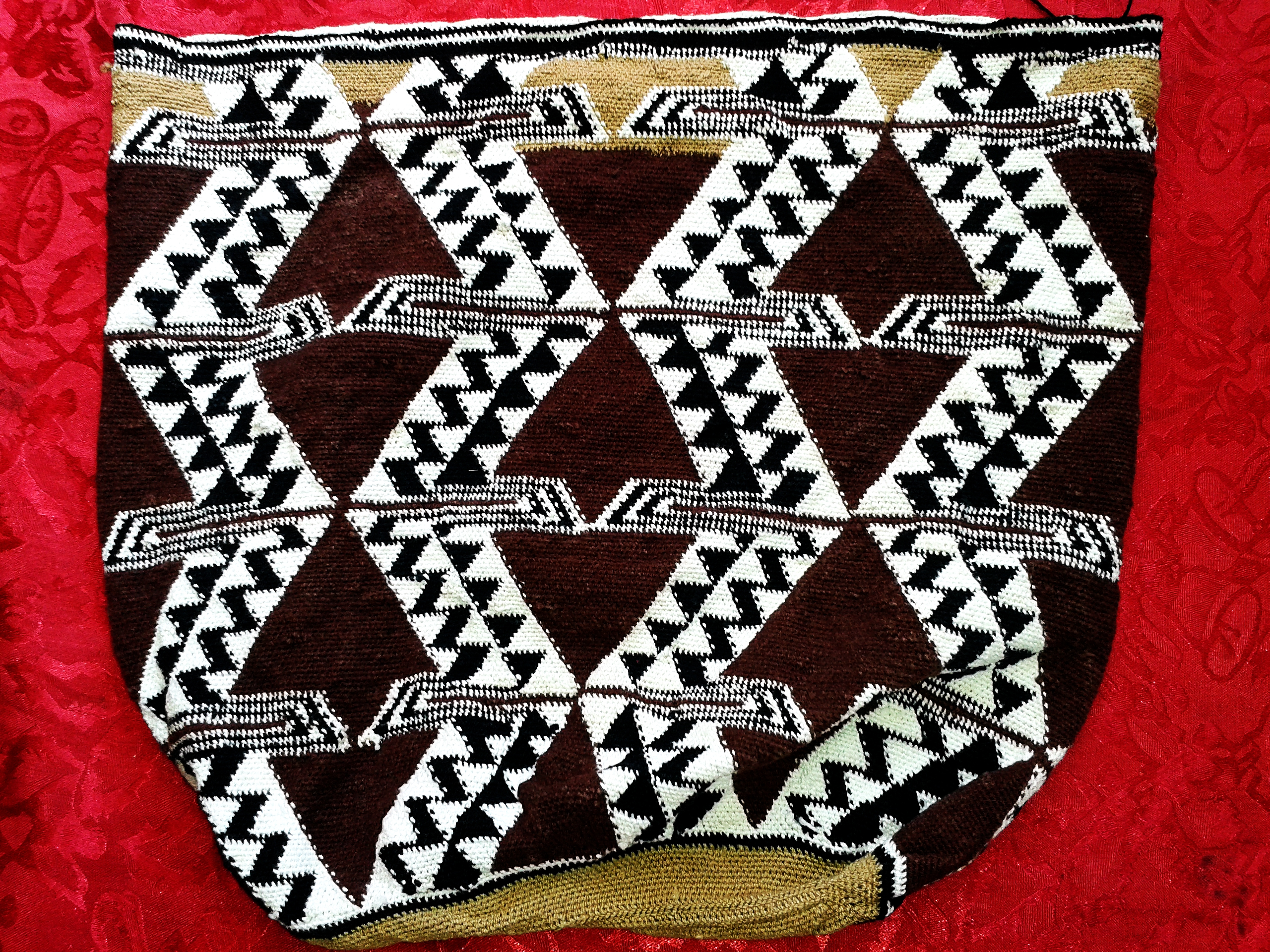
Chácara or string bag.

Chácaras (called kra in Ngäbere), are sturdy bags made from plant fibers. The nalbinding technique is used. The bags are used both as storage units and to transport materials. Occasionally you can even see infants being transported in a chácara. Some women also make these bags to sell so they may participate in the informal economy.

Families have a few large cooking pots called pailas and many keep chicha, a corn drink, in the house.

Ngäbe-Bugle men typically wear homemade multi-colored pants, straw hats and rubber boots, while women wear full bright colored dresses with shoulder and neckline adornments (nagua) and embroidered bands around the waist and bottom. Women generally do not wear shoes. These items are usually made at home with hand crank sewing machines and, like chácaras, sold for extra income.

The filing of teeth to a point using a machete sharpener is not uncommon among Ngäbe-Bugle men and women, although the practice is generally carried out in more traditional areas.

Families are usually rather large and often groups of women live close together so they can assist each other when caring for children. Polygamy was once common among the Ngäbe-Buglé as the number of wives and children a man has signifies prestige. It is no longer common since supporting multiple wives and large families is increasingly difficult.

Social capital and reciprocity networks formed through a kinship system are important for reducing economic and social resource vulnerability while creating opportunity for families to cooperate and take advantage of more opportunities that will help them and other members of their kinship group get by. Marriage and kinship relations also play a large part in determining land ownership and use rights.

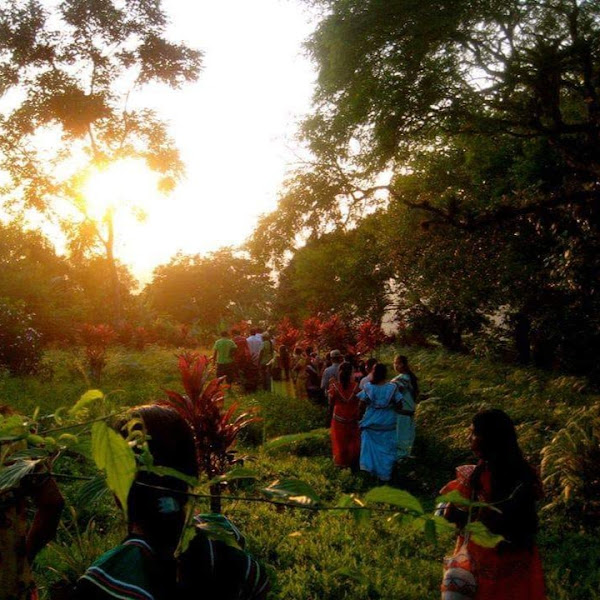
We walk in Beauty

== Land use ==
As the Ngäbe-Buglé typically practice subsistence agriculture, definitions of land ownership and use are of pinnacle importance to every household, especially as population increases in proportion to arable land in the comarca and productive land is degraded by excessive use. The intricate system on which land resources are allocated is based on the kinship system. Ownership rights to unclaimed land are established through occupation and farming, although very little fertile land in the comarca remains unclaimed. Members of a kinship group collectively own land, but those who live in the village on the land control it. Undeniable rights to this collectively owned land belong to each member of the kinship group, while borrowed rights are often extended to the members of a spouses family, although these rights can be revoked. In this way, social organization shapes the pattern of economic life and livelihood for most Ngäbe-Bugle. The most common crops grown in the comarca Ngäbe-Buglé are corn, rice, beans, otoe, bananas, and coffee although people also grow tomatoes, peppers and other vegetables in smaller gardens at home. Fruits such as mangos, oranges, nance, grow seasonally along with cacao, all of which supplement the Ngäbe-Bugle diet. Meat is rarely eaten although many families keep cows, pigs, ducks, and chickens (mostly egg laying); sardines are a common staple and hojaldras (fried Panamanian bread) are sometimes eaten for breakfast. Most farming is done on land cleared using slash and burn techniques, and due to growing population pressures, this land is rarely left fallow for sufficient time, so crop yields tend to decrease over time.

== Economy and resources ==
As subsistence agriculture becomes less and less reliable, the Ngäbe-Buglé people have started to participate in the cash economy, which provides some relatively accessible alternatives for generating capital and obtaining necessary amenities and resources. Labor is one abundant resource the Ngäbe-Buglé possess, although due to poor education and low human capital including health and nutrition, the labor force is rather unskilled. As a result, many men serve as migrant agricultural workers or leave the comarca to seek other types of informal jobs. 2008. Many men work during the coffee harvest in the Chiriquí Highlands including Boquete and Santa Clara. This region of Panama is known for high quality shade-grown, and in some cases, organic coffee. The Ngäbe-Buglé also harvest seasonal vegetables grown at higher altitudes. Women also participate in the informal economy by making chacaras, naguas and jewelry to sell, and some men sew pants or weave hats to do the same. Social capital is again salient to participation in the informal economy as relationships provide people with new opportunities to make money; social capital can even be a mechanism used to attract help from both governmental and non-governmental organizations.

== Adversity and modernity ==
The Ngäbe-Buglé experience much adversity as a result of contemporary conditions. As localized problems of land and crop shortage grow into a more generalized issue, and it becomes more difficult to generate capital in a shrinking labor market, malnutrition is prevalent, especially in children and expecting mothers. Attempts to generate capital by becoming a migrant worker also have negative social effects including added strains on family structure and increased pressure on women to provide for their children alone. The dispersed nature of the population also makes existing medical care hard to access, and a general lack of potable water and sanitation services cause a myriad of health problems. Lack of sufficient infrastructure and under provision of social services by the government is often the root of many problems that plague the most rural areas.

Prevalence of poor Spanish skills is also an issue as Ngäbe-Buglé people are often unaware of legal rights and hence either fail to communicate complaints or to use the paths of legal recourse available to them when it would be beneficial to do so. This condition especially affects women because far fewer of them speak Spanish than men. Levels of secondary education are also low in the comarca Ngäbe-Buglé as children are financially limited and transportation to secondary schooling presents a great challenge for many families. As a result, only ~18% of children ages 15–19 in the comarca Ngöbe-Buglé have schooling beyond the sixth grade.

Finally, many Ngäbe-Buglé communities are threatened by environmental degradation caused by both farming and government or corporate exploitation of their land. The Cerro Colorado copper deposit, one of the world's largest deposits of copper ore is located in the comarca Ngäbe-Buglé. Mining in the area, although it is legal because the property rights of subsurface resources belong to the state, poses a great environmental threat as waste materials from extraction and processing pollute local watersheds. Although they may provide temporary income, mining endeavors also have many adverse social and cultural effects in the comarca and most natives are opposed to mineral exploitation on their lands.
