= Districts of Panama =

Sub-divisions of provinces and some of the comarcas in Panama

The provinces of Panama and some of the comarcas are divided into districts (distrito). The district are further divided into corregimientos of Panama.

More than 50% of the country's population resides in the districts of Panama, San Miguelito, Arraijan, Chorrera, and Colon.

Panama map divided in districts

== List ==
District	Capital	Area (km^{2})	Population (2023 census)	Population Density (per km^{2})	Province/Comarca
Almirante	Puerto Almirante	14.7	28,368	14.7	Bocas del Toro Province
Bocas del Toro	Bocas del Toro	285.0	17,274	60.6	Bocas del Toro Province
Changuinola	Changuinola	2222.5	101,091	45.5	Bocas del Toro Province
Chiriquí Grande	Chiriquí Grande	210.2	12,495	59.4	Bocas del Toro Province
Alanje	Alanje	455.7	18,877	41.5	Chiriquí Province
Barú	Puerto Armuelles	600.2	56,307	93.8	Chiriquí Province
Boquerón	Boquerón	298.2	21,001	70.4	Chiriquí Province
Boquete	Bajo Boquete	489.8	23,562	48.1	Chiriquí Province
Bugaba	La Concepción	517.3	68,870	133.1	Chiriquí Province
David	David	892.4	156,498	175.4	Chiriquí Province
Dolega	San Francisco de Dolega	251.4	37,678	149.9	Chiriquí Province
Gualaca	Gualaca	619.0	9,831	15.9	Chiriquí Province
Remedios	Remedios	172.2	4,388	25.5	Chiriquí Province
Renacimiento	Río Sereno	528.6	22,429	42.4	Chiriquí Province
San Félix	Las Lajas	226.3	6,881	30.4	Chiriquí Province
San Lorenzo	Horconcitos	688.8	8,031	11.7	Chiriquí Province
Tolé	Tolé	484.9	13,193	27.2	Chiriquí Province
Tierras Altas	Volcán	359.8	23,525	65.4	Chiriquí Province
Aguadulce	Aguadulce	470.0	49,005	104.3	Coclé Province
Antón	Antón	743.9	59,194	79.6	Coclé Province
La Pintada	La Pintada	1,031.3	29,698	28.8	Coclé Province
Natá	Natá	613.1	19,741	32.2	Coclé Province
Olá	Olá	377.2	6,300	16.7	Coclé Province
Penonomé	Penonomé	1,707.5	104,326	61.1	Coclé Province
Colón	Colón City	1,194	240,722	201.6	Colón Province
Chagres	Nuevo Chagres	447.2	10,968	24.5	Colón Province
Donoso	Miguel de la Borda	1,627.8	12,274	7.5	Colón Province
Omar Torrijos Herrera	Coclesito	197.5	3,561	18.0	Colón Province
Portobelo	Portobelo	398.7	10,320	25.9	Colón Province
Santa Isabel	Palenque	739.9	4,111	5.6	Colón Province
Chepigana	La Palma	4,697.5	12,983	2.8	Darién Province
Pinogana	El Real de Santa María	4,894.8	21,523	4.4	Darién Province
Santa Fe	Santa Fe	2,450.4	19,729	8.1	Darién Province
Cémaco	Unión Chocó	3,058.5	9,547	3.1	Emberá-Wounaan Comarca
Sambú	Puerto Indio	1,307.0	2,811	2.2	Emberá-Wounaan Comarca
Guna Yala	Gaigirgordub	2,307.6	32,016	13.9	Guna Yala Comarca
Chitré	Chitré	88.4	60,957	689.6	Herrera Province
Las Minas	Las Minas	468.7	6,642	14.2	Herrera Province
Los Pozos	Los Pozos	384.8	6,928	18.0	Herrera Province
Ocú	Ocú	618.6	16,116	26.1	Herrera Province
Parita	Parita	354.0	9,695	27.4	Herrera Province
Pesé	Pesé	289.0	13,009	45.0	Herrera Province
Santa María	Santa María	159.4	8,724	54.7	Herrera Province
Guararé	Guararé	212.8	12,107	56.9	Los Santos Province
Las Tablas	Las Tablas	717.1	30,440	42.5	Los Santos Province
Los Santos	La Villa de los Santos	432.1	30,028	69.5	Los Santos Province
Macaracas	Macaracas	505.4	8,965	17.7	Los Santos Province
Pedasí	Pedasí	376.6	4,942	13.1	Los Santos Province
Pocrí	Pocrí	276.2	3,025	11.0	Los Santos Province
Tonosí	Tonosí	1,291.8	8,959	6.9	Los Santos Province
Naso Tjër Di	Sieyic	1,606.3			Naso Tjër Di Comarca
Besikó	Soloy	753.2	31,422	41.7	Ngäbe-Buglé Comarca
Jirondai	Samboa	1379.0	25,804	18.7	Ngäbe-Buglé Comarca
Kankintú	Bisira	1,044.5	19,751	18.9	Ngäbe-Buglé Comarca
Kusapín	Kusapín	843.4	17,047	20.2	Ngäbe-Buglé Comarca
Mironó	Hato Pilón	340.2	21,800	64.1	Ngäbe-Buglé Comarca
Müna	Chichica	799.5	47,200	64.1	Ngäbe-Buglé Comarca
Nole Duima	Cerro Iglesias	185.0	20,709	165.6	Ngäbe-Buglé Comarca
Ñürüm	Buenos Aires	581.9	17,637	30.3	Ngäbe-Buglé Comarca
Santa Catalina o Calovébora	Santa Catalina o Calovébora	902.8	10,714	11.9	Ngäbe-Buglé Comarca
Balboa	San Miguel	331.8	1,989	6.0	Panamá Province
Chepo	Chepo	5,043.5	65,588	13.0	Panamá Province
Chimán	Chimán	995.5	3,142	3.2	Panamá Province
Panamá	Panama City	2,045.6	1,086,990	531.4	Panamá Province
San Miguelito	San Miguelito	49.9	280,777	5,629.6	Panamá Province
Taboga	Taboga	12.2	1,089	89.4	Panamá Province
Arraiján	Arraiján	418.1	299,079	715.3	Panamá Oeste Province
Capira	Capira	974	45,629	46.8	Panamá Oeste Province
Chame	Chame	375.3	28,535	76.0	Panamá Oeste Province
La Chorrera	La Chorrera	787.9	258,221	327.7	Panamá Oeste Province
San Carlos	San Carlos	336.8	22,201	65.9	Panamá Oeste Province
Atalaya	Atalaya	156.1	17,507	112.1	Veraguas Province
Calobre	Calobre	805.1	11,666	14.5	Veraguas Province
Cañazas	Cañazas	781.9	16,933	21.7	Veraguas Province
La Mesa	La Mesa	509.8	12,238	24.0	Veraguas Province
Las Palmas	Las Palmas	1,015.2	18,071	17.8	Veraguas Province
Mariato	Mariato	1,391.7	5,791	4.2	Veraguas Province
Montijo	Montijo	774.4	6,784	8.8	Veraguas Province
Río de Jesús	Río de Jesús	316.5	4,822	15.2	Veraguas Province
San Francisco	San Francisco	434.3	10,107	23.3	Veraguas Province
Santa Fe	Santa Fe	1,921.1	18,023	9.4	Veraguas Province
Santiago	Santiago de Veraguas	969.8	109,605	113.0	Veraguas Province
Soná	Soná	1,521.7	28,244	18.6	Veraguas Province
