= Rail transport in Panama =

Since 2008, there was only one functioning railroad in Panama, a number that increased to two in 2014 with the opening of the Panama Metro. The first one was the Panama Canal Railway, operated by the Panama Canal Railway Company, successor of Panama Railway, which provides passenger and freight service between Panama City (on the Pacific coast) and Colón (on the Atlantic coast). In 2014, Panama Metro started operation. Historically, there were also narrow gauge railroads in Chiriquí Province (Ferrocarril de Chiriquí), which were abandoned in the late 20th century.

== Panama Canal Railway ==
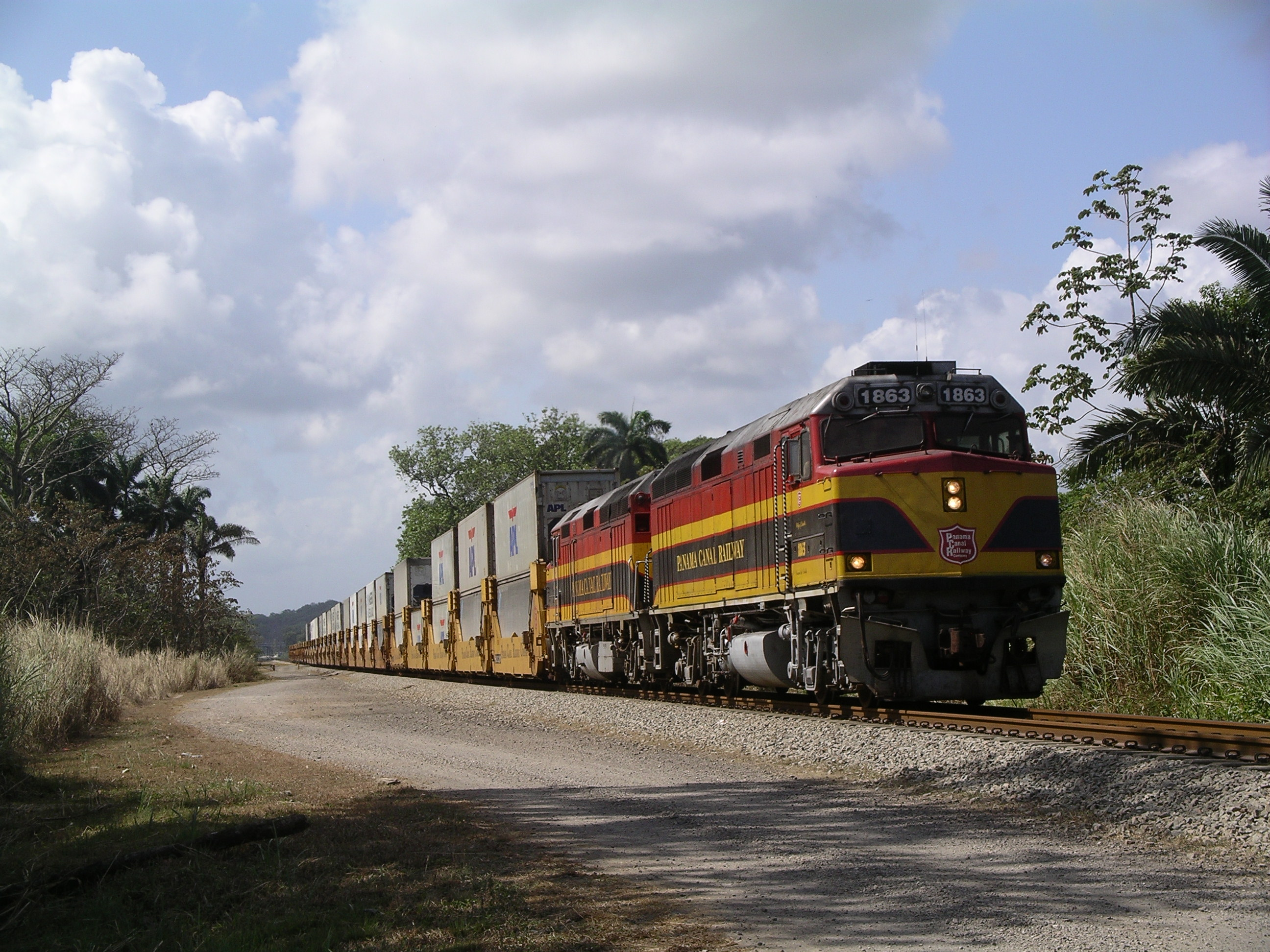
Panama Canal Railway Container train arrival at Colon

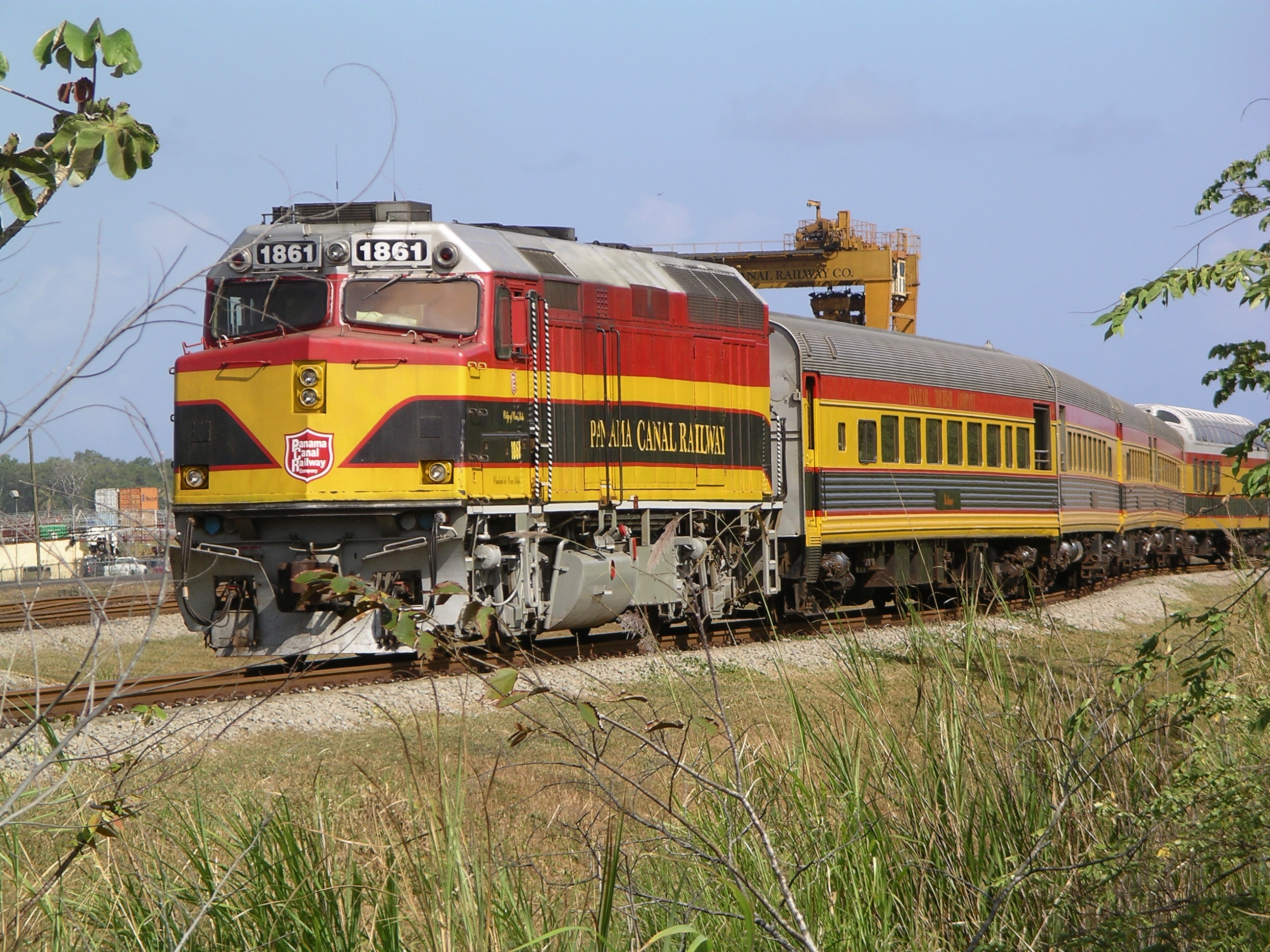
Panama Canal Railway Passenger train in yard at Colon

During the first half of the 19th century, travel across the Isthmus of Panama was difficult and dangerous. The need for a more reliable interoceanic communication grew stronger after the acquisition of California by the United States. The construction of a transcontinental railroad started in 1850 and the first train from coast to coast passed on January 28, 1855. However, more than twelve thousand workers probably died during the construction.

The railway greatly assisted in the building of Panama Canal, which closely paralleled and in some places took over the rail line. Parts of the rail route were moved during the building of the canal, and considerable additions were made to the rail system. The rebuilt and improved Panama Railway beside the canal was completed in 1912.

In 1979, the United States government handed over control of the Canal Zone and railway to the government of Panama. On 19 June 1998, the government of Panama turned over control to the private Panama Canal Railway Company ("PCRC"). The Panama Railway was originally 1,524 mm (5 ft) broad gauge, but when it was rebuilt in 2000, the gauge was changed to 1,435 mm (4 ft 8 1/2 in) standard gauge. The route is 47.6 miles (76.6 km) long across the Isthmus of Panama from Colón (Atlantic) to Balboa (Pacific, near Panama City).

As of 2015, Panama Canal Railway Company runs both passenger and freight trains between Panama City and Colón. Passenger service consists of one service in each direction Monday-Friday and the regular one way fare is US$25.

== Ferrocarril de Chiriquí ==
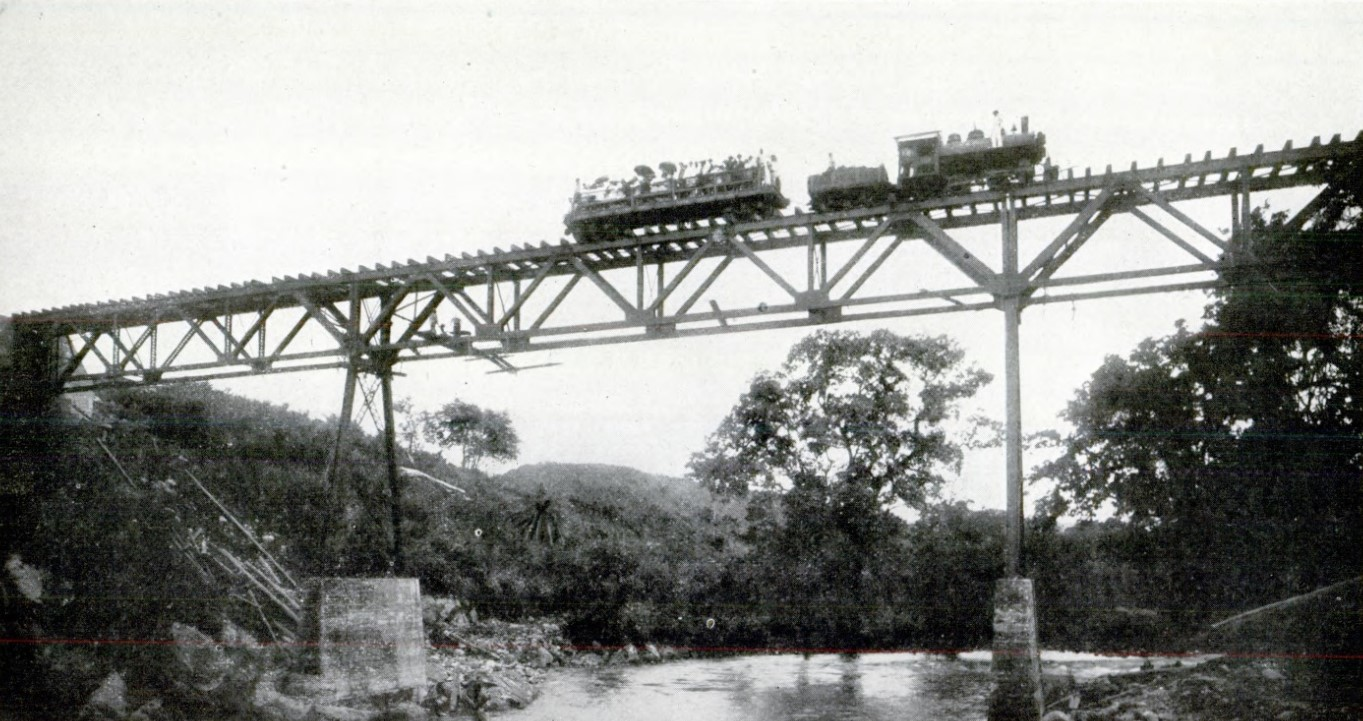
Bridge of the Chiriquí Railway

At the end of the nineteenth century, the government of Panama studied the feasibility of additional railroads. In 1910, Panama Railway was commissioned to estimate cost of a railroad from Panama City to David, Chiriquí with branches to Antón (Coclé Province) and Los Santos. The costs were however too high and the government decided to construct additional network in Chiriquí Province only. In 1914, a contract was signed for construction of a railroad David - Boquete - Concepción with a branch Dolega - Potrerillos and another short one to Puerto Pedregal. The railroad was inaugurated on April 23, 1916, with the first train from David to Boquete.

Edwards Rail Car company reports an undated acknowledgment of their three railcars, which were delivered to Ferrocarril de Chiriquí probably in the 1920s.

After 1974, the infrastructure of Chiriquí Railroads was transferred to Ministry of Public Works (Ministerio de Obras Públicas) and operations were stopped around 1990. At the beginning of the twenty-first century, the tracks of the defunct railroads were being dismantled and reused for construction of bridges in rural areas.

In David, the depot is now a public library, while a steam locomotive, No. 1, is on display at the city's fairgrounds. Rehabilitation of the depot and the rolling stock located at La Concepción for a new museum began in January 2021. The museum had its ribbon cutting ceremony in August 2024.

== Chiriquí Land Company ==
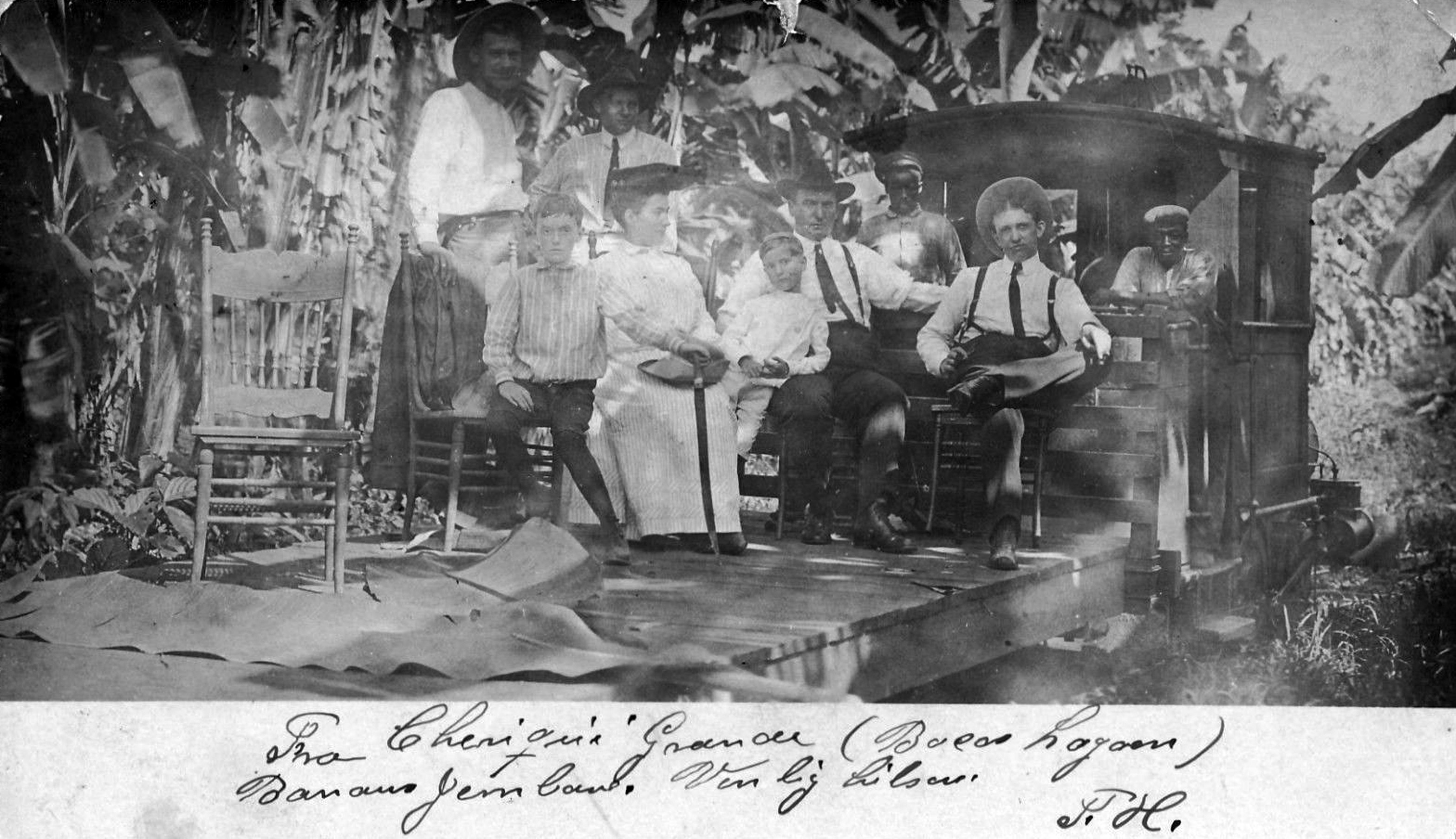
Plantation tram probably on an excursion

The Chiriquí Land Company was a United Fruit company involved in banana growing and real estate management in Panama. It also operated railroads that at their peak totaled about 300 km, more than the Panama Railroad and FNC put together. Their primary traffic was bananas, but it also ran public passenger and freight trains.

These were divided into two systems of similar size, both entirely 914 mm (3 ft) narrow gauge. The southern, in Chiriquí Province, was closed by 1988. The northern, in Bocas del Toro Province, covered Almirante, Changuinola, Guabito and parts of Sixaola. The last-mentioned section closed in 1999, leaving only the bridge over Changuinola River. The remainder was closed between 2005 and 2008. The railroad used General Electric engines.

== Trams ==
Two separate and distinct tram or streetcar systems operated in Panama City. The first started service on October 1, 1893, and ended during the Thousand Days' War. The second started in 1913 and operated, with reorganizations and company transferrals, until May 31, 1941. Some streets in the old town still have rails in the pavement. There have been proposals for a tramway system to supplement the Panama City Metro, but as of 2022 no construction has taken place.

== Panama City Metro ==
Contracts were awarded in 2010 for line 1 of the Panama Metro in Panama City, with 14 stations. Service began in April 2014, and the first phase of line two began service in 2019, bringing the total number of stations to 29.

== Panama City-David railway ==
The government of Panama and China Tiesiju Civil Engineering Group had collaborated to construct a new high-speed railway between Panama City and David, following the formalization of Panamanian-Chinese relations in June 2017. The project, favored by president Juan Carlos Varela, was cancelled by September 2019 by his successor Laurentino Cortizo.

The project was highlighted by president-elect José Raúl Mulino in 2024.

As of April 2026, the project is undergoing feasibility studies.

== See also ==
- Panama
- Transport in Panama
- Panama Railway
- Rail transport by country
