= Almirante District =

Almirante
- District

- Location of the district capital in Panama
- Coordinates: 09°18′00″N 82°24′00″W
- Country: Panama
- Province: Bocas del Toro
- Capital: Puerto Almirante

Area
  - Total: 1,936 km^{2} (747 sq mi)

Population (2023)
  - Total: 28,368
- Time zone: UTC-5 (ETZ)

Almirante District is a district in the Bocas del Toro Province of Panama. It covers an area of 1,936 km^{2} (747 sq mi) and has a population of 28,368 as per the 2023 census. It was created from the Changuinola District in 2015.

== History ==
The region was earlier known as Caribaró by the native people, and it was named Almirante, meaning "Admiral" in Spanish, in honor of Christopher Columbus, who visited the region in 1502. The town of Almirante developed in the early 20th century after United Fruit Company constructed a railway line to link the region with Changuinola, for the transport of fruits and other goods. The port of Almirante was established in December 1910, which was developed further in the 1910s.

== Geography ==
Almirante District is one of the 82 districts of Panama. The district lies in the Almirante Bay in the Caribbean coast of Panama in the Bocas del Toro Province. It is spread over an area of 1,936.2 km^{2} (747.6 sq mi). The majority of the district consists of low lying floodplains susceptible to flooding.

== Administration and politics ==
Almirante District was created by Law 39 on 8 June 2015. It was split off from the Changuinola District. Its capital is the city of Almirante, a major port city in Panama.

Almirante District is divided administratively into the following corregimientos–Almirante, Nance de Risco, Valle del Risco, Valle de Agua Arriba, Barriada Guaymí, Barrio Francés, Bajo Culubre (es), Cauchero, Ceiba (es), and Miraflores (es).

The National Assembly of Panama has 71 members, who are elected directly from single and multi-member constituencies. The district forms part of the Bocas del Toro Province, which has two electoral circuits, and elects three members to the National Assembly.

== Demographics ==
As per the 2023 census, Almirante District had a population of 28,368 inhabitants. The population increased by 17% from 24,265 in the 2010 census. The population consisted of 13,969 and 14,399 females. About 11,641 (41%) of the inhabitants were below the age of 14 years and 1,519 inhabitants (5.4%) was above the age of 65 years. Majority (69.7%) of the population was classified as rural with the remaining 30.3% classified as urban. Ngabe people (75.7%) formed the major ethnic group in the district, while non-indigenous people formed 22.9% of the population.
