= 1991 Limon earthquake =

Earthquake in Central America

- Location within Costa Rica
- UTC time: 1991-04-22 21:56:51
- ISC event: 336255
- USGS-ANSS: ComCat
- Local date: April 22, 1991
- Local time: 3:57 pm
- Magnitude: 7.7 M_{w}
- Depth: 10 km (6.2 mi)
- Epicenter: 9.685°N 83.073°W
- Type: Reverse
- Areas affected: Costa Rica; Panama
- Max. intensity: MMI X (Extreme)
- Tsunami: 3 m (9.8 ft)
- Casualties: 47–127 dead 109–759 injured 7,439–10,900 displaced

The 1991 Costa Rica earthquake, also known as the Limon earthquake or Bocas del Toro earthquake, occurred at 3:57 pm local time (21:56:51 UTC) on April 22. The epicenter of the 7.7 M_{w} earthquake was in Pandora, Valle La Estrella, in the Caribbean region of Limon, Costa Rica, 225 kilometres (140 mi) southeast of San José. The earthquake was the strongest recorded in Costa Rica's history, and was felt throughout the country as well as in western Panama.

== Damage ==
The earthquake claimed 48 lives in Costa Rica and 79 in Bocas del Toro, Panama. Roads and bridges between Limon and Sixaola were all destroyed, and the epicentral region was only accessible by helicopter from the Panamanian side.

In Limon, hotels and other landmarks collapsed and 1.85 m (6 ft 1 in) of uplift at the waterfront left coral and sand bluffs exposed. In Panama, extensive damage also occurred in Guabito, Changuinola, Almirante and Isla Colon. The Chiquita Brands office building in Changuinola separated with a 3-meter breach.

== Aftermath ==
The international bridge of Sixaola stayed intact. At the Changuinola "Capitán Manuel Niño" International Airport damage on the south end of the runway was severe, and very few planes were able to land. Helicopters were the primary aircraft bringing in relief workers, food, and supplies.

By 1993, the Changuinola-Guabito road was reconstructed with $10 million USD funded by the Panamanian government, and new housing facilities were constructed in Finca 4 and Almirante. Reconstruction of the Limon-Sixaola road took months, and in 2010 the road was paved and coded as Highway 36.

== See also ==
- List of earthquakes in 1991
- List of earthquakes in Costa Rica
- List of earthquakes in Panama
