= Changuinola =

- Corregimiento and town
- Interactive map of Changuinola
- Location within Panama
- Coordinates: 9°26′N 82°31′W
- Country: Panama
- Province: Bocas del Toro
- District: Changuinola

Area
  - Land: 96.7 km^{2} (37.3 sq mi)

Population (2010)
  - Total: 31,223
- Time zone: UTC-5 (Eastern Time)
  - Summer (DST): UTC-5 (No DST)
- Climate: Af

Changuinola is a city in the Bocas del Toro Province of Panama and seat city of the Changuinola District. The city attracts tourists as a popular gateway to Bocas Town and nearby cities Almirante and Chiriqui Grande.
Changuinola is surrounded by Changuinola River and extensive banana plantations.

== Demographics ==
The corregimiento of Changuinola has a land area of 96.7 square kilometres (37.3 sq mi) and had a population of 31,223 as of 2010, giving it a population density of 323 inhabitants per square kilometre (840/sq mi). Its population as of 1990 was 33,721; its population as of 2000 was 39,896.

== Climate ==
Changuinola is a coastal location with a tropical climate, more specifically a trade-wind tropical rainforest climate. The area does not have a predictable dry season. The driest times are late August to mid-October and February to March. Changuinola is humid. Thundershowers and heavy rain are common. Normal temperatures are consistent all year, with maxima being 80 to 84 °F (26.7 to 28.9 °C) and minima 71 to 75 °F (21.7 to 23.9 °C). Due to its low latitude, sunrise is around 6 AM, and sunset is around 6 PM local time. These times vary slightly during the year. Weather data is collected at Capitán Manuel Niño International Airport.

Climate data for Changuinola
Month	Jan	Feb	Mar	Apr	May	Jun	Jul	Aug	Sep	Oct	Nov	Dec	Year
Mean daily maximum °C (°F)	27.7 (81.9)	27.9 (82.2)	28.3 (82.9)	29.2 (84.6)	29.7 (85.5)	29.7 (85.5)	29.3 (84.7)	29.6 (85.3)	29.9 (85.8)	29.3 (84.7)	28.5 (83.3)	28.2 (82.8)	28.9 (84.1)
Daily mean °C (°F)	25.0 (77.0)	25.1 (77.2)	25.5 (77.9)	26.3 (79.3)	26.9 (80.4)	26.9 (80.4)	26.5 (79.7)	26.7 (80.1)	26.8 (80.2)	26.6 (79.9)	26.0 (78.8)	25.5 (77.9)	26.2 (79.1)
Mean daily minimum °C (°F)	22.8 (73.0)	22.7 (72.9)	23.1 (73.6)	24.0 (75.2)	24.9 (76.8)	25.0 (77.0)	24.7 (76.5)	24.7 (76.5)	24.8 (76.6)	24.7 (76.5)	24.2 (75.6)	23.5 (74.3)	24.1 (75.4)
Average rainfall mm (inches)	232.9 (9.17)	157.6 (6.20)	150.9 (5.94)	192.9 (7.59)	359.1 (14.14)	361.4 (14.23)	443.2 (17.45)	346.1 (13.63)	268.3 (10.56)	337.5 (13.29)	454.8 (17.91)	304.6 (11.99)	3,609.3 (142.1)
Source: Weather.Directory

== Transportation ==
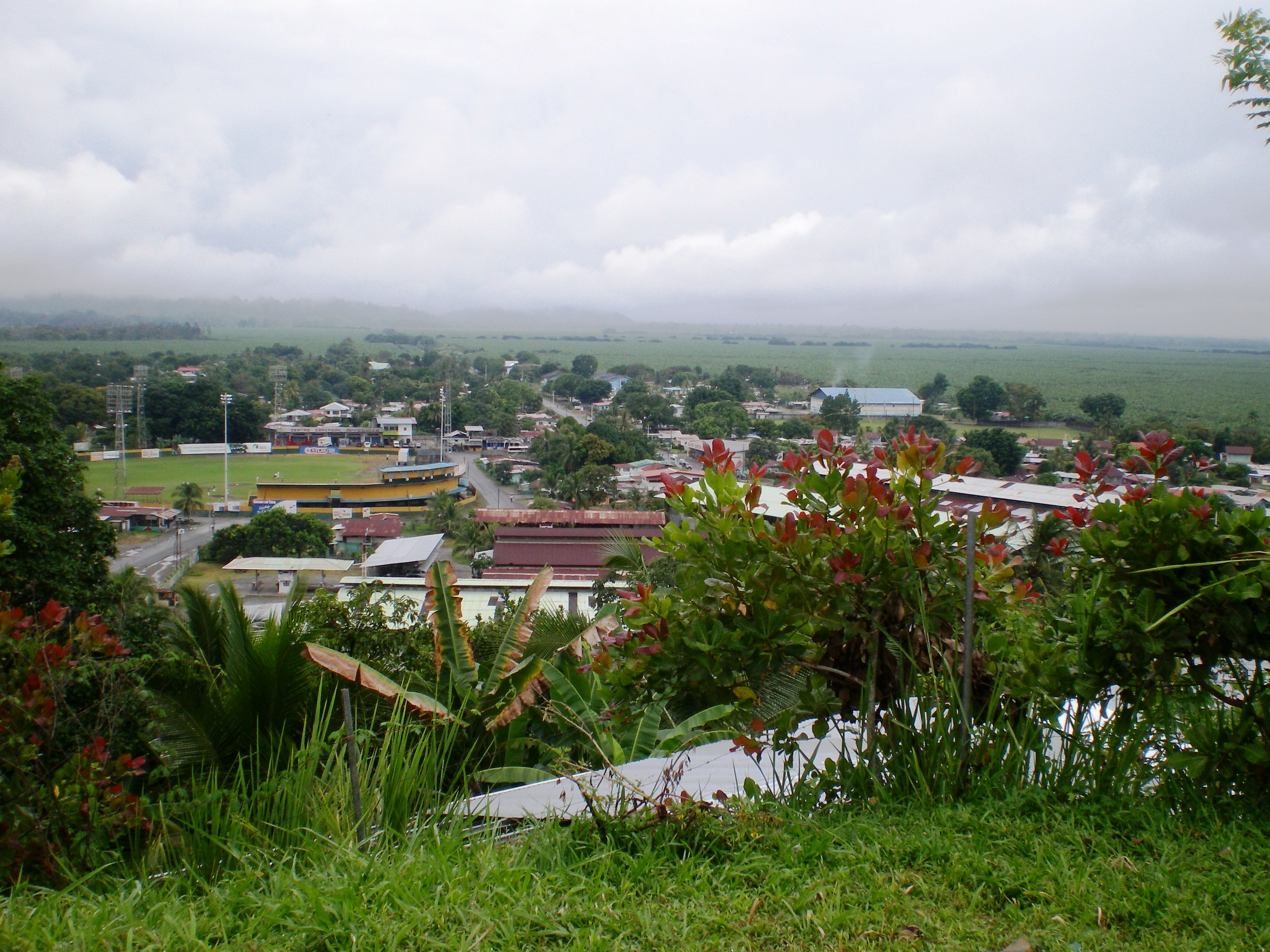
El Empalme hill view

Changuinola is accessible by air, land, or sea. Visitors can fly into Capitán Manuel Niño International Airport from Panama City by Air Panama. It has daily flights but can be delayed due to frequent thunderstorms and heavy rains. Direct flights from the United States, Canada, and Mexico are not available.

Buses run between Changuinola, Almirante, David and Panama City. When traveling by land, tourists coming from or going to Costa Rica must clear both Costa Rican customs in Sixaola and Panamanian customs in Guabito. Buses are more reliable in bad weather.

== Infrastructure ==
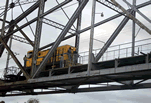
GE Diesel Electro-motive engine over old Changuinola River Bridge

Changuinola is divided into small farm communities called "Fincas", since all of the city is surrounded by banana plantations.

Changuinola has one main road that crosses the town from south to north and connects Changuinola to Guabito, at the Panama–Costa Rica border.

The Changuinola River bridge was built in 2009 and replaced the 1920 railroad bridge next to it.

Changuinola was struck in April 1991 by the 7.7 M_{w} Bocas del Toro eqarthquake, and the town was reconstructed in the following years.

== Public Services ==
Private and Public health care available. The CSS Changuinola Hospital is located right next to the Police station, and private clinics are also available.

Changuinola has several public and private schools, to mention most important IPT Changuinola and Empalme School.

University of Panama extension "CRUB" is located in Empalme, Changuinola
