= 1984 CONCACAF Champions' Cup =

20th edition of premier club football tournament organized by CONCACAF

- Dates: 15 March – 21 October

Final positions
- Champions: (Haiti) Violette

The 1984 CONCACAF Champions' Cup was the 20th edition of the CONCACAF Champions' Cup, the annual international club association football competition held in the CONCACAF region (North America, Central America and the Caribbean). It determined that year's club champion in the CONCACAF region and was played from 15 March to 21 October 1984.

The teams were split in two zones, North/Central America and Caribbean, (as North and Central America sections combined to qualify one team for the final), each one qualifying the winner to the final tournament. The final was scratched and Violette were declared champions and became CONCACAF champion for the first time in their history after CD Guadalajara and New York Pancyprian-Freedoms were disqualified for their failure to agree on match dates. The Pancyprian-Freedoms had planned to host their leg of the North/Central American final at the Los Angeles Memorial Coliseum in early December, but the dates conflicted with the league schedules for Guadalajara.

== North/Central American Zone ==
=== First round ===
| Team 1 | Agg. | Team 2 | 1st leg | 2nd leg |
|---|---|---|---|---|
| Pumas UNAH (Honduras) | 1–2 | (Mexico) Puebla | 0–0 | 1–2 |
| Águila (El Salvador) | 2–7 | (Mexico) Guadalajara | 2–4 | 0–3 |
| Sagrada Familia (Costa Rica) | 1–1 (5–3 p) | (Guatemala) Suchitepéquez | 0–0 | 1–1 |
| Comunicaciones (Guatemala) | 3–1 | (El Salvador) FAS | 1–1 | 2–0 |
| New York Pancyprian-Freedoms (United States) | w/o | (Bermuda) Hotel Internacional F.C. | w/o | Cancelled |
| Jacksonville Tea Men (United States) | 4–0 | (Panama) Chirilanco | 0–0 | 4–0 |
| Vida (Honduras) | w/o | (Panama) Chorrillo | w/o | Cancelled |

- Puebla, Sagrada Familia, Comunicaciones and New York Pancyprian-Freedoms, Guadalajara and Vida advanced to the Second round.
- Hotels International and Chorrillo FC withdrew

| 21 March 1984 | Pumas UNAH (Honduras) | 0–0 | (Mexico) Puebla | Tegucigalpa, Honduras |
| | | | | Stadium: Estadio Tiburcio Carías Andino |

- Universidad in fact were the Honduras national team

| 25 April 1984 | Puebla (Mexico) | 2–1 (2–1 agg.) | (Honduras) Pumas UNAH | Puebla, Mexico |
| | | | | Stadium: Estadio Cuauhtémoc |

- Universidad in fact were the Honduras national team

| 8 April 1984 | Águila (El Salvador) | 2–4 | (Mexico) Guadalajara | San Salvador, El Salvador |
| | Bautista González x 2 | | Eduardo de la Torre; Luis Manuel Díaz; Jaime León; Jaime Pajarito | Stadium: Estadio Cuscatlán |

| 25 April 1984 | Guadalajara (Mexico) | 3–0 (7–2 agg.) | (El Salvador) Águila | Guadalajara, Mexico |
| | | | | Stadium: Estadio Jalisco |

- 2nd leg abandoned in 85' due to fighting; result stood

| 15 March 1984 | Sagrada Familia (Costa Rica) | 0–0 | (Guatemala) Suchitepéquez | San José, Costa Rica |
| | | | | Stadium: Estadio Nacional de Costa Rica |

| 1 April 1984 | Suchitepéquez (Guatemala) | 1–1 (1–1 agg.) (3–5 p) | (Costa Rica) Sagrada Familia | Suchitepéquez, Guatemala |
| | | | | Stadium: Estadio Carlos Salazar Hijo |

| 25 March 1984 | Comunicaciones (Guatemala) | 1–1 | (El Salvador) FAS | Guatemala City, Guatemala |
| | Byron Perez | | Jose Luis Rugamas | Stadium: Estadio Doroteo Guamuch Flores |

| 1 April 1984 | FAS (El Salvador) | 0–2 (1–3 agg.) | (Guatemala) Comunicaciones | Santa Ana, El Salvador |
| | | | | Stadium: Estadio Óscar Quiteño |

| 21 April 1984 | Jacksonville Tea Men (United States) | 0–0 | (Panama) Chirilanco | Jacksonville, United States |
| | | | | Stadium: Gator Bowl Stadium |

| 28 April 1984 | Chirilanco (Panama) | 0–4 (0–4 agg.) | (United States) Jacksonville Tea Men | El Empalme, Panama |
| | | | | Stadium: Estadio El Empalme |

=== Second round ===
| Team 1 | Agg. | Team 2 | 1st leg | 2nd leg |
|---|---|---|---|---|
| Vida (Honduras) | 2–0 | (Costa Rica) Sagrada Familia | 1–0 | 1–0 |
| New York Pancyprian-Freedoms (United States) | 2–2 (4–2 p) | (Mexico) Puebla | 0–0 | 2–2 (aet) |
| Guadalajara (Mexico) | w/o | (United States) Jacksonville Tea Men | w/o | Cancelled |
| Comunicaciones (Guatemala) | bye | | | |

| 19 May 1984 | Vida (Honduras) | 1–0 | (Costa Rica) Sagrada Familia | La Ceiba, Honduras |
| | Lacayo 36' | | | Stadium: Estadio Nilmo Edwards |

| 30 May 1984 | Sagrada Familia (Costa Rica) | 0–1 (0–2 agg.) | (Honduras) Vida | San José, Costa Rica |
| | | | 75' Zúñiga | Stadium: Estadio Teodoro Picado |

| 17 June 1984 | New York Pancyprian-Freedoms (United States) | 0–0 | (Mexico) Puebla | Hempstead, New York, United States |
| | | | | Stadium: Hofstra Stadium |

| 19 June 1984 | Puebla (Mexico) | 2–2 (2–2 agg.) (2–4 p) | (United States) New York Pancyprian-Freedoms | Hempstead, New York, United States |
| | | | | Stadium: Hofstra Stadium |

| Guadalajara (Mexico) | w/o | (United States) Jacksonville Tea Men |

- Jacksonville Tea Men withdrew

| Jacksonville Tea Men (United States) | Cancelled | (Mexico) Guadalajara |

- Comunicaciones bye to third round

=== Third round ===
| Team 1 | Agg. | Team 2 | 1st leg | 2nd leg |
|---|---|---|---|---|
| Comunicaciones (Guatemala) | 1–4 | (Mexico) Guadalajara | 0–0 | 1–4 |
| New York Pancyprian-Freedoms (United States) | 2–2 (5–3 p) | (Honduras) Vida | 1–1 | 2–2 (aet) |

| 30 September 1984 | Comunicaciones (Guatemala) | 0–0 | (Mexico) Guadalajara | Guatemala City, Guatemala |
| | | | | Stadium: Estadio Doroteo Guamuch Flores |

| 31 October 1984 | Guadalajara (Mexico) | 4–1 (4–1 agg.) | (Guatemala) Comunicaciones | Guadalajara, Mexico |
| | | | | Stadium: Estadio Jalisco |

| 29 September 1984 | New York Pancyprian-Freedoms (United States) | 1–1 | (Honduras) Vida | New York City, United States |
| | | | | Stadium: Metropolitan Oval; Attendance: 4,000 |

| 2 October 1984 | Vida (Honduras) | 1–1 (2–2 agg.) (3–5 p) | (United States) New York Pancyprian-Freedoms | Hempstead, New York, United States |
| | Not listed 62' | Newsday | Touros 55' | Stadium: James M. Shuart Stadium; Attendance: 2,500 |

- both legs in New York

=== Fourth round ===
| Team 1 | Agg. | Team 2 | 1st leg | 2nd leg |
|---|---|---|---|---|
| New York Pancyprian-Freedoms (United States) | Cancelled | (Mexico) Guadalajara | | |

- Originally scheduled to be played over one leg on Jan 22, 1985 at the Los Angeles Memorial Coliseum; later postponed to be played in March but on February 27 both clubs were disqualified.

== Caribbean Zone ==
=== First round ===
| Team 1 | Agg. | Team 2 | 1st leg | 2nd leg |
|---|---|---|---|---|
| Aigle Noir (Haiti) | 0–1 | (Netherlands Antilles) Victory Boys | 0–0 | 0–1 |
| SUBT (Netherlands Antilles) | 1–1 ^{1} | (Guadeloupe) Cygne-Noir | 0–0 | 1–1 |

^{1} Both clubs were disqualified for late payment of the entry fee.

| Aigle Noir (Haiti) | 0–0 | (Netherlands Antilles) Victory Boys |

| Victory Boys (Netherlands Antilles) | 1–0 (1–0 agg.) | (Haiti) Aigle Noir |

| SUBT (Netherlands Antilles) | 0–0 | (Guadeloupe) Cygne-Noir |

| Cygne-Noir (Guadeloupe) | 1–1 (1–1 agg.) | (Netherlands Antilles) SUBT |

- Both clubs were disqualified for late payment of the entry fee.

- other fixtures not known but apparently the following clubs also entered: Saint George's (Cayman Islands), CS Moulien (Guadeloupe), RC Rivière Pilote (Martinique), Guayama Cruz Azul (Puerto Rico), Defence Force (Trinidad and Tobago), Violette AC (Haiti), ASL Sports (reportedly from Trinidad and Tobago but may be ASL Sport Guyanais from French Guyana).
- Robinhood and Transvaal (both Surinam) were registered too late.

=== Second round ===
Other matches and results are unknown.

| Team 1 | Agg. | Team 2 | 1st leg | 2nd leg |
|---|---|---|---|---|
| Violette (Haiti) | 6–0 | (Netherlands Antilles) Victory Boys | 3–0 | 3–0 |

| Violette (Haiti) | 3–0 | (Netherlands Antilles) Victory Boys |

| Victory Boys (Netherlands Antilles) | 0–3 (0–6 agg.) | (Haiti) Violette |

Both matches were played in Haiti.

- Other matches and results are unknown.

=== Third round ===
| Team 1 | Agg. | Team 2 | 1st leg | 2nd leg |
|---|---|---|---|---|
| Sport Guyanais (French Guiana) | 2–2 | (Haiti) Violette | 0–0 ^{1} | 2–2 |

Other matches and results are unknown.
^{1} Results from 1st leg are in doubt.

| Sport Guyanais (French Guiana) | 0–0 | (Haiti) Violette |
| Nil | | Nil |

| Violette (Haiti) | 2–2 (2–2 agg.) | (French Guiana) Sport Guyanais |

== Final series ==
On February 27, 1985, CONCACAF announced that the final series was cancelled and Violette were awarded the championship, with CD Guadalajara and New York Pancyprian-Freedoms both being disqualified for failing to agree on match dates.

== Champion ==
CONCACAF Champions' Cup
1984 Champions
(Haiti)
Violette
First title
