= 2002 Burica earthquake =

Earthquake affecting Panama and Costa Rica

- Location within Central America
- UTC time: 2002-07-31 00:16:48
- ISC event: 3232876
- USGS-ANSS: ComCat
- Local date: July 30, 2002
- Local time: 19:16:48
- Magnitude: 6.5 M_{w}
- Depth: 22.5 km (14.0 mi)
- Epicenter: 7.91°N 82.75°W
- Type: Strike-slip
- Areas affected: Panama, Costa Rica
- Max. intensity: MMI VII (Very strong)
- Aftershocks: 6.0 M_{w} Aug 7 at 23:59 UTC
- Casualties: 11–15 injured

The 2002 Burica earthquake occurred on July 30 at 19:16:48 local time off the coast of Panama. It had a magnitude of M_{w} 6.5. The epicenter was located off the southeastern coast of Burica Peninsula, close to the Costa Rica–Panama border. Some homes collapsed and at least 11 people were reported injured, both in Panama and in Costa Rica. The strongest intensity reached VII (Very strong) in Puerto Armuelles, Panama. It was felt with III (Weak) to IV (Light) around San Jose, Costa Rica. Shops in the center of Puerto Armuelles suffered from loss such as fallen merchandise and broken window glass. This earthquake occurred along the Panama fracture zone.

== Tectonic setting ==
To the northwest of the border area between Panama and Costa Rica oceanic crust of the Cocos plate is being subducted beneath the Caribbean plate along the Middle America Trench. To the southeast the Nazca plate is being subducted. The boundary between the Cocos and Nazca plates is formed by the Panama fracture zone, which is a right lateral transform fault that intersects with the Middle America Trench to form a triple junction. The geometry of the subduction zone differs markedly either side of this triple junction. Previous destructive earthquakes along this fracture zone that affected Puerto Armuelles include events in 1934 (M_{s} 7.7) and 1979 (M_{s} 6.5).

== Earthquake ==
The earthquake had an epicenter close to Punta Burica. The estimated magnitude was in the range 6.2–6.5 M_{w}. The observed focal mechanism, strike-slip faulting, the location and the hypocentral depth of 4.2 km are all consistent with movement on the Panama Fracture Zone. The mainshock was followed by a series of aftershocks, the largest of which was a M_{w} 6.0 event on August 7 at 23:59 UTC.

== Damage ==
Several buildings were destroyed by the earthquake, although these were in a poor condition before the shaking started. At Puerto Armuelles, the banana dock was badly affected and some houses of wooden or unreinforced masonry construction had to be abandoned, due to either their collapse or the degree of structural damage suffered. Generally light injuries were reported, with a total of between 8 and 15 people affected.

== See also ==
- List of earthquakes in 2002
- List of earthquakes in Costa Rica
- List of earthquakes in Panama
