= Calvin Byron Stadium =

Baseball field in Bocas del Toro, Panama

- El nido de la tortuga (Turtle's nest)
- Interactive map of Calvin Byron Stadium
- Former names: El Empalme (1972–1995)
- Location: El Empalme, Changuinola, Panama
- Coordinates: 9°24′53.30″N 82°31′18.37″W
- Owner: INDE
- Operator: Pandeportes
- Capacity: 2,500
- Surface: Grass
- Field size: LF - 335 feet (102 m); CF - 400 feet (120 m); RF - 335 feet (102 m)

Construction
- Opened: -
- Cost: -
- General contractor: -

Tenant
- Bocas del Toro Baseball Team

Calvin Byron Stadium (formerly known as El Empalme) is a 2,500–3,000 seat baseball field in El Empalme, Changuinola. It is the home of the Tortugueros (Turtle Men) of Bocas del Toro.

== History ==
The original stadium name was "El Empalme." In 1998, the name was changed to honor local baseball player and trainer Calvin Byron.

Also, former Anaprof soccer founder team Chirilanco FC played games in this stadium in the 1980s.

There is a small movement to restore stadium's name to original name El Empalme, since Calvin Byron as person did not express affection for Bocas del Toro Province, and showed interest returning to Nicaragua.

== Features ==
The stadium was completely remodeled in 2009, and has light towers for night playing. The government donated a new electronic scoreboard in 2012.
