= 1621 Panama earthquake =

Earthquake in Panama with minor tsunami in 1621

1621 Panama Earthquake
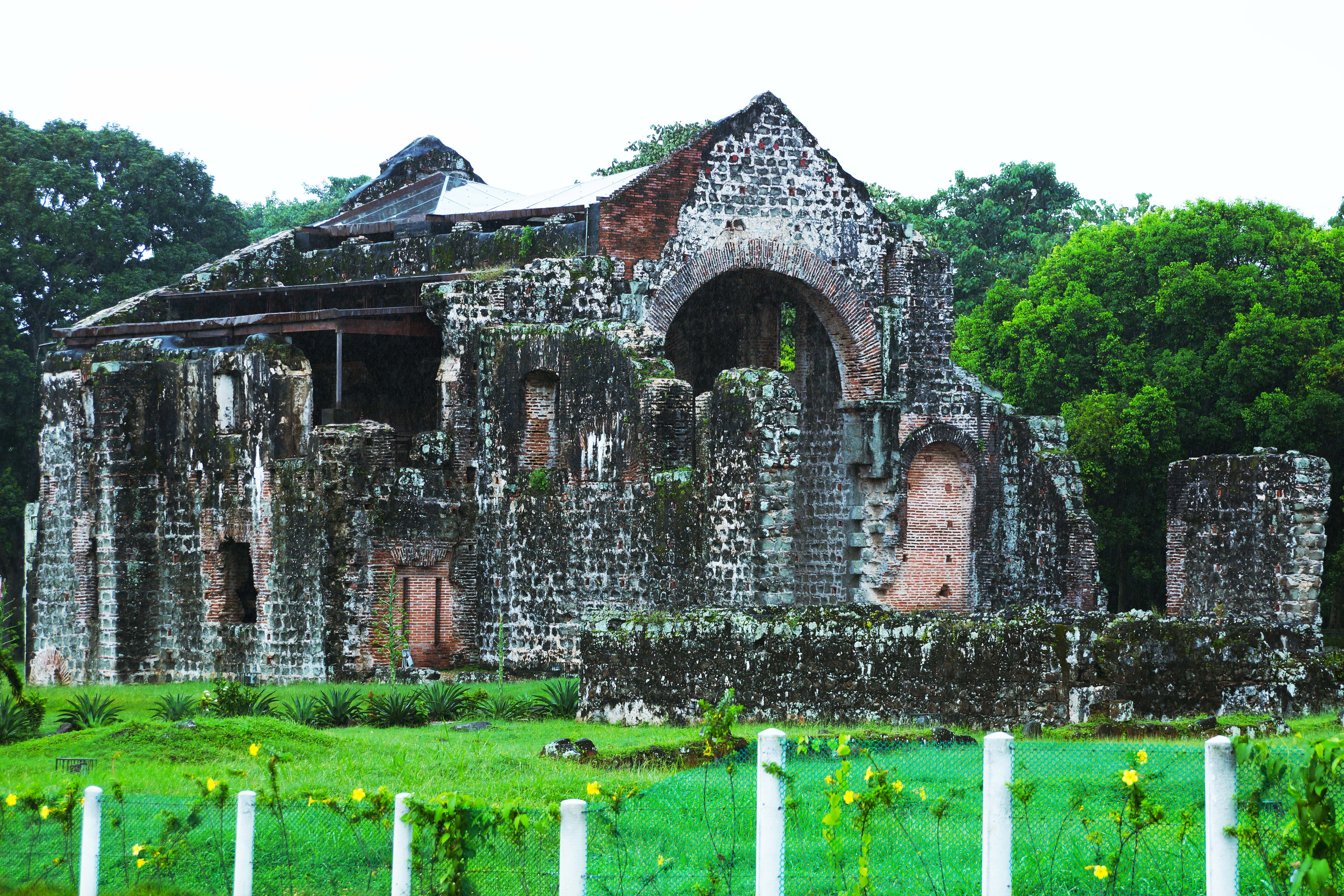
- Ruins of the Convento de la Concepción

- Location within Central America
- Local date: 2 May, 1621
- Local time: ~16:30 (UTC-5)
- Epicenter: 8.6°N 79.3°W
- Fault: Pedro Miguel Fault
- Type: Strike-slip
- Total damage: Moderate
- Max. intensity: MMI VII (Very strong)
- Tsunami: Minor
- Foreshocks: One felt

The 1621 Panama earthquake, also known as the Panamá Viejo earthquake occurred between 16:30 and 16:45 (UTC−5) on 2 May, 1621. It is considered to be the first documented violent quake in the Isthmus of Panama, with the epicenter at Pedro Miguel Fault, with a maximum Mercalli intensity of VII (Very strong). The quake shook and partially destroyed the Old Panama City, (Panama Viejo), which at that time was a town of about 5,000 inhabitants. It left extensive damage, especially with buildings made of masonry which were partially or fully destroyed.

Among the buildings that suffered total collapse were the council, municipal, barracks and prison buildings, and the house of the judge of the Audiencia of Panama. The Convento de la Concepción and the Church of the Society of Jesus also suffered considerable damage, but were only partially rebuilt. The earthquake was preceded by a minor earthquake, which occurred between 9:00-10:00 (UTC-5) and a small tsunami was reported by a witness, which flooded a street bordering the coast of Panama city.

== See also ==
- List of earthquakes in Panama
- List of historical earthquakes
