= List of earthquakes in Panama =

Notable earthquakes in the history of Panama include the following:

== Earthquakes ==
Date	Region	Mag.	MMI	Deaths	Injuries	Comments	
2026-10-09	Herrera	7.7 M_{w}	IX	2	27		
2009-07-04	Panama / Costa Rica	6.0 M_{w}	V		32	Limited damage	NGDC (1972)
2004-02-04	Panama / Costa Rica	6.1 M_{w}			Very many	Limited damage	NGDC (1972)
2003-12-25	Puerto Armuelles	6.5 M_{w}	VII	2	75	Moderate damage	
2002-07-30	Burica Peninsula	6.5 M_{w}	VII		11–15	Moderate damage	
2000-11-08	Panama / Colombia	6.5 M_{w}			Some	Moderate damage	NGDC (1972)
1991-05-04	Bocas del Toro Province	6.2 M_{s}			36	Moderate damage	NGDC (1972)
1991-04-22	Costa Rica / Panama	7.7 M_{w}	X	75–87	563–759	Extreme damage	
1983-04-03	Costa Rica / Panama	7.3 M_{s}		6	Some	Moderate damage	NGDC (1972)
1941-12-05	Costa Rica / Panama	7.6 M_{s}	IV	6	Many	Moderate damage / tsunami	NGDC (1972)
1934-07-18	Panama / Costa Rica	7.7 M_{s}	VII		4	Limited damage / tsunami	NGDC (1972)
1882-09-07	San Blas Islands	8.3 M_{s}	XI	250		Severe damage / tsunami	NGDC (1972)
1621-05-02		6.9 M_{L}	VII			Moderate damage / tsunami	
Note: The inclusion criteria for adding events are based on WikiProject Earthquakes' notability guideline that was developed for stand alone articles. The principles described also apply to lists. In summary, only damaging, injurious, or deadly events should be recorded.
