= Las Tablas =

Las Tablas may refer to:

- Las Tablas, Los Santos, Panama
- Las Tablas, Bocas del Toro, Panama
- Las Tablas District, Panama
- Las Tablas in Jerez de la Frontera, Cadiz Province, Spain
- Las Tablas (Madrid Metro), a station on Line 10 and ML-1
