= Chiriquí Grande District =

- District

- Location of the district capital in Panama
- Coordinates: 8°57′0″N 82°7′12″W
- Country: Panama
- Province: Bocas del Toro
- Capital: Chiriquí Grande

Area
  - Total: 210.2 km^{2} (81.2 sq mi)

Population (2023)
  - Total: 12,495
  - Density: 59.44/km^{2} (154.0/sq mi)
- official estimate
- Time zone: UTC-5 (ETZ)

Chiriquí Grande District is a district in the Bocas del Toro Province of Panama. It covers an area of 210.2 km^{2} (81.2 sq mi) and has a population of 12,495 as per the 2023 census. The district stretches from the central highlands to the coast of the Caribbean Sea, and forms one of the terminals of the Trans-Panama pipeline.

== Geography ==
Chiriquí Grande District is one of the 82 districts of Panama. It is part of the Bocas del Toro Province. It is spread over an area of 210.2 km^{2} (81.2 sq mi). The district stretches from the central high lands to the Laguna de Chiriquí along the coast of the Caribbean Sea. The Trans-Panama pipeline begins at the Atlantic Terminal in Chiriquí Grande, and ends at Charco Azul, Chiriquí Province.

== Administration and politics ==
Chiriquí Grande District was established in 1903, with its capital at the town of Chiriquí Grande. It is divided administratively into six corregimientos–Chiriquí Grande, Miramar, Punta Peña, Punta Robalo, Rambala, and Bajo Cedro.

The National Assembly of Panama has 71 members, who are elected directly from single and multi-member constituencies. The district forms part of the Bocas del Toro Province, which has two electoral circuits, and elects three members to the National Assembly.

== Demographics ==
As per the 2023 census, Chiriquí Grande District had a population of 12,495 inhabitants. The population increased from 11,016 in the 2010 census. The population consisted of 6,154 males and 6,341 females. About 4,866 (38.9%) of the inhabitants were below the age of 14 years and 620 inhabitants (5.0%) were above the age of 65 years. The majority (87.1%) of the population was classified as rural while the remaining 12.9% was classified as urban. Ngäbe people (65.3%) formed the major ethnic group in the district, while non-indigenous people formed 32.2% of the population.
