= 1882 Panama earthquake =

Largest earthquake recorded in Panamanian history

- Location within Panama
- UTC time: 1882-09-07 08:50
- ISC event
- USGS-ANSS
- Local date: September 7, 1882
- Local time: ~3:50 (UTC-5)
- Duration: 1 minute
- Magnitude: 7.9–8.3 M_{s}
- Depth: Unknown
- Epicenter: 10.0°N 79.0°W
- Areas affected: Panama
- Max. intensity: MMI XI (Extreme)
- Tsunami: 3 meters
- Landslides: Yes
- Casualties: 250 deaths

The 1882 Panama earthquake occurred on September 7 at around 03:50 (UTC-5). The earthquake measured a magnitude between 7.9 and 8.3 on the surface-wave magnitude scale, making it the largest earthquake recorded in Panamanian history. It struck the San Blas Islands and was strongly felt in the City of Colón as well as the capital of Panama City. The earthquake also produced a major tsunami that had a maximum run-up of 3 meters (9.84 ft.). In total, the earthquake killed 250 people, 75 of which were from the tsunami. The earthquake and tsunami also halted the construction of the Panama Canal by a few months.

== Tectonic setting ==
The earthquake was an example of extreme underthrusting of the North Panamanian Deformed Belt (NPDB). Panama lies within the Panamanian block which is considered to be home to a broad zone of deformation. A slow southwestern convergence in-between the Caribbean plate and Panamanian microplate, as well as a ductile buckling deformation eastward along the boundary with the North Andes Block, The other escaping deformation along northeast to southwest strike-slip faults within the South American plate and the back-arc thrusting transferred subduction of the Cocos Ridge along most of Costa Rica is what formed the NPDB. Active folding within the convergence of the Caribbean and Panamanian plates have long speculated that shallow subduction between both plates could also mean in intermediate-depth earthquakes delineating a found slab.

There have been five recorded earthquakes over 7.0 in magnitude that have occurred in the NPDB, including this event. Other earthquakes that have occurred in this region include the 1882 earthquake near Costa Rica, the 1904 Costa Rica earthquake with a magnitude of 7.2, the 1914 Panama earthquake and the 1991 Limon earthquake in Costa Rica killing 127 people.

=== Wadati-Benioff zone debate ===
There has been a long debate surrounding this speculation, which also concludes the lack of the Wadati-Benioff zone, a zone that also depicts a shallow subduction between the Caribbean and Panama plates. Many have called the NPDB into question due to the lack of volcanic activity and earthquakes below a depth of 70 km within the belt. However, it has been debunked that the reason why a lack of volcanism is present is due to the slow convergence rate as well as the uncertain initiation of subduction within the slab, as well as its depth which lacks the dehydration and volcanism. Overall, the lack of identification to a fault subducting underneath northern Panama has been the key component of this debate.

== Earthquake ==
The earthquake occurred at around 3:50 a.m. local time on September 7, 1882. Multiple sources estimate it to be 7.9 on the surface-wave magnitude scale. The earthquake was said to have lasted about 60 seconds in the cities of Colon and Panama according to local reports. The earthquake lasted so long that many buildings collapsed in a matter of seconds as well as masonry from churches and buildings within the urban areas. Residents who were asleep quickly ran outside to local parks to avoid being hit with falling glass and cement. Isoseismal record say that the earthquake measured an intensity of VIII–IX on the Modified Mercalli intensity scale, however official intensities accounting the tsunamis and landslides associated with the quake say that the earthquake recorded intensities as high as XI (Extreme). Three aftershocks were later reported with unknown magnitudes but with estimated intensities of IV.

=== Tsunami ===
A tsunami was later reported, possibly triggered by a nearby landslide. Its maximum run-up of 3 and it measured 3–4 meters in height. While the tsunami mostly struck the San Blas Islands, it was also observed in gauges around Nicaragua, Colombia and Ecuador.

== Damage ==
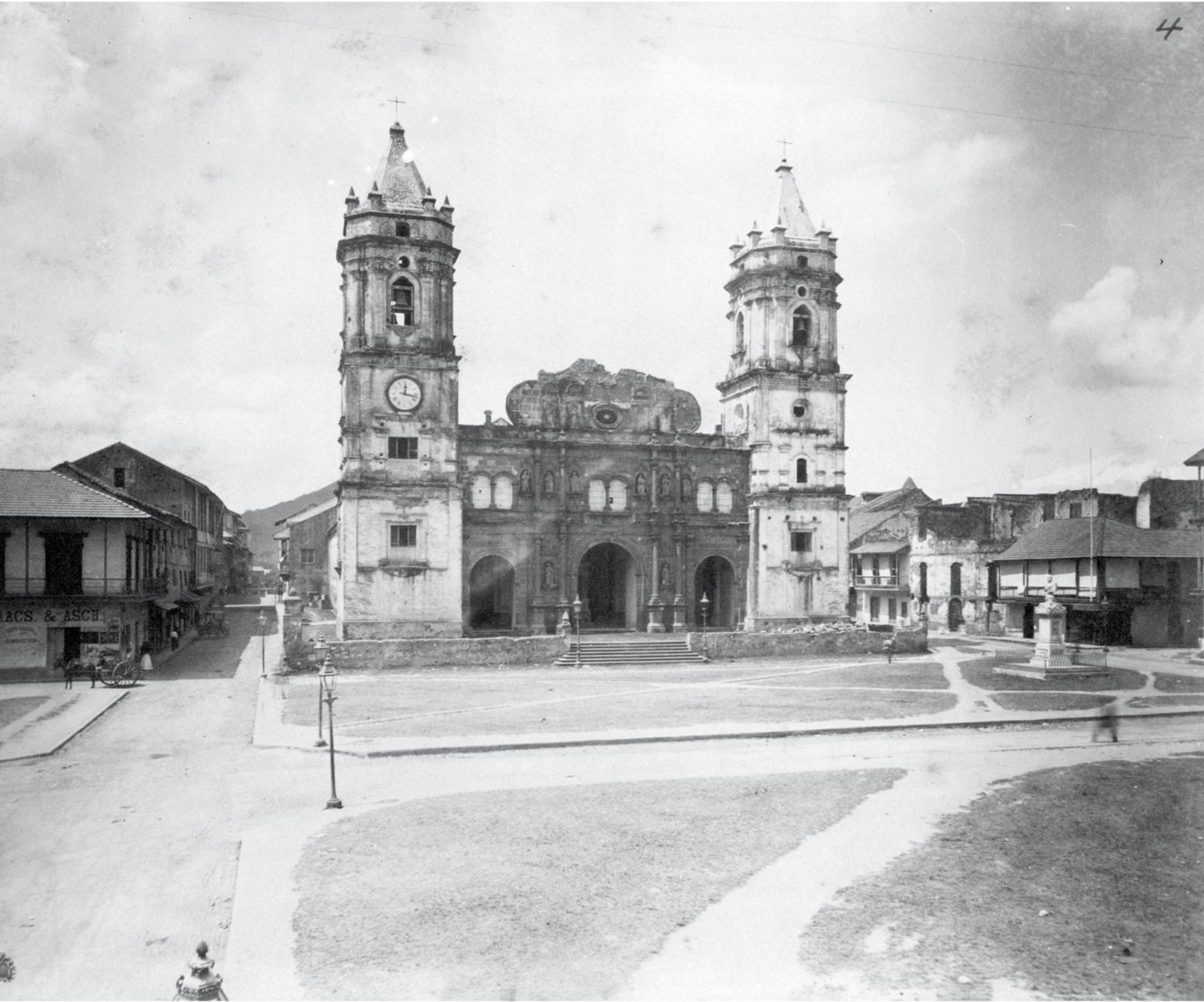
Image of a cathedral in Panama city three years after the earthquake

When the earthquake occurred, glass windows and bottles shattered and cracks were visible. Multiple churches were either completely destroyed or severely damaged. On the island of San Miguel, the wall of a church collapsed as residents struggled to carry statues of saints inside. A cathedral suffered the same fate when heavy masonry blocks fell from the ceiling ornament of the entrance. Each of the arches inside the cathedral were cracked and huge stones and pieces of cement fell. A total of $40,000 were needed for the cathedral's full repair. The Malamba church's tower also fell, as did the roof of the nearby Iglesia de Santa Church. The Las Cruces church built in stone collapsed completely. A bronze statue of Christopher Columbus swayed during the quake to the point that its stone pedestal moved four inches from its original position. Almost all houses in Panama City were destroyed. The town hall suffered multiple cracks and one of its facades fell, killing multiple people. The Panama-Colon railway completely derailed. The Municipal Government and Assembly hall's balcony also fell and most of the building suffered many cracks. In the village of Rio Indio, two freshwater lagoons dried up completely. In Gatún, another village, three ranches collapsed, killing an old woman who was asleep.

A total of 250 people were killed, 75 from the San Blas Islands after the tsunami. People jumped out of windows due to shock, and most of them died. Collapse of facades and walls of houses and government buildings caused even more deaths. A report from the construction of the Panama canal stated damage and possible deaths.

=== Damage in other countries ===
An underwater cable in Jamaica broke. In Venezuela and Colombia, along the Atrato and Riosucio rivers, sand and mud volcanoes occurred. A thermal spring formed in Turbo, Colombia, almost flooding the entire city. The earthquake was felt as far as the northwestern coast of South America.

== See also ==
- List of earthquakes in Panama
- List of historical earthquakes
- List of megathrust earthquakes
