= Restrepia aberrans =

Scientific classification
- Kingdom: Plantae
- Clade: Tracheophytes
- Clade: Angiosperms
- Clade: Monocots
- Order: Asparagales
- Family: Orchidaceae
- Subfamily: Epidendroideae
- Genus: Restrepia
- Species: R. aberrans

Binomial name
- Restrepia aberrans Luer

Species of flowering plant

Restrepia aberrans is a species of flowering plant in the family Orchidaceae.

Restrepia aberrans is native to the wet tropical biome of Costa Rica and Panama.

The species is an epiphyte.

== Taxonomy ==
Robert Louis Dressler, Carlyle A. Luer, and two colleagues collected the holotype in 1985. It was found in a forest in Panama's Chiriquí Grande District, at an elevation of 350 metres (1,150 ft). The specimen flowered in cultivation.

Restrepia aberrans was named by Luer in 1996. He placed it as the only species in the subgenus Ecmeles.

== Conservation ==
Restrepia aberrans is listed in Appendix II of CITES. There are restrictions on its export from Panama.
