= Rambala =

- Corregimiento and town
- Location within Panama
- Coordinates: 8°55′N 82°9′W
- Country: Panama
- Province: Bocas del Toro
- District: Chiriquí Grande
- Established: March 7, 1997

Area
  - Land: 33.6 km^{2} (13.0 sq mi)

Population (2010)
  - Total: 1,682
  - Density: 50.1/km^{2} (130/sq mi)
- Population density calculated based on land area.
- Time zone: UTC−5 (EST)

Rambala is a town and corregimiento in Chiriquí Grande District, Bocas del Toro Province, Panama. It has a land area of 33.6 square kilometres (13.0 sq mi) and had a population of 1,682 as of 2010, giving it a population density of 50.1 inhabitants per square kilometre (130/sq mi). It was created by Law 10 of March 7, 1997; this measure was complemented by Law 5 of January 19, 1998 and Law 69 of October 28, 1998. Its population as of 2023 was 1,365.
