= Nance de Risco =

Coordinates: 9.3358°N 82.2545°W

Nance del Risco
- Corregimiento
- Location within Panama
- Country: Panama
- Province: Bocas del Toro
- District: Changuinola
- Established: February 26, 2009

Area
  - Land: 1,052.4 km^{2} (406.3 sq mi)

Population (2010)
  - Total: 1,760
  - Density: 1.7/km^{2} (4.4/sq mi)
- Population density calculated based on land area.
- Time zone: UTC−5 (EST)

Nance del Risco is a corregimiento in Changuinola District, Bocas del Toro Province, Panama. It has a land area of 1,052.4 square kilometres (406.3 sq mi) and had a population of 1,760 as of 2010, giving it a population density of 1.7 inhabitants per square kilometre (4.4/sq mi). It was created by Law 18 of February 26, 2009.
