= El Silencio, Bocas del Toro =

El Silencio
- Corregimiento
- Interactive map of El Silencio
- Location within Panama
- Coordinates: 9°23′30″N 82°32′00″W
- Country: Panama
- Provinces: Bocas del Toro
- District: Changuinola
- Time zone: UTC−5 (EST)

El Silencio is a corregimiento in Bocas del Toro Province in the Republic of Panama.
