= La Gloria, Bocas del Toro =

La Gloria
- Corregimiento
- Interactive map of La Gloria
- Location within Panama
- Coordinates: 8°59′N 82°14′W
- Country: Panama
- Province: Bocas del Toro
- District: Changuinola
- Established: February 26, 2009

Area
  - Land: 165.2 km^{2} (63.8 sq mi)

Population (2010)
  - Total: 3,046
  - Density: 18.4/km^{2} (48/sq mi)
- Population density calculated based on land area.
- Time zone: UTC−5 (EST)

La Gloria is a corregimiento in Changuinola District, Bocas del Toro Province, Panama. It has a land area of 165.2 square kilometres (63.8 sq mi) and had a population of 3,046 as of 2010, giving it a population density of 18.4 inhabitants per square kilometre (48/sq mi). It was created by Law 18 of February 26, 2009.
