= Finca 6 =

- Corregimiento
- Interactive map of Finca 6
- Location within Panama
- Coordinates: 9°28′N 82°31′W
- Country: Panama
- Provinces: Bocas del Toro
- District: Changuinola
- Time zone: UTC−5 (EST)

Finca 6 is a corregimiento in Bocas del Toro Province in the Republic of Panama.
