= Valle del Risco =

- Corregimiento and town
- Location within Panama
- Coordinates: 9°13′48″N 82°25′48″W
- Country: Panama
- Province: Bocas del Toro
- Established: January 19, 1998

Area
  - Land: 576.8 km^{2} (222.7 sq mi)

Population (2010)
  - Total: 4,187
  - Density: 7.3/km^{2} (19/sq mi)
- Population density calculated based on land area.
- Climate: Af

Valle del Risco Corregimiento, is a group of small rural communities in the Bocas del Toro Province of Panama. The biggest community is Valle del Risco, where there is a school and medical services.

To reach Valle Risco, one must drive from Almirante, Bocas del Toro, passing high mountains and dangerous curves.

It has a land area of 576.8 square kilometres (222.7 sq mi) and had a population of 4,187 as of 2010, giving it a population density of 7.3 inhabitants per square kilometre (19/sq mi). It was created by Law 5 of January 19, 1998. Its population as of 2000 was 3,422.
