= Las Delicias, Bocas del Toro =

Las Delicias
- Corregimiento
- Interactive map of Las Delicias
- Location within Panama
- Coordinates: 9°36′N 82°48′W
- Country: Panama
- Province: Bocas del Toro
- District: Changuinola
- Established: February 26, 2009

Area
  - Land: 206.9 km^{2} (79.9 sq mi)

Population (2010)
  - Total: 1,484
  - Density: 7.2/km^{2} (19/sq mi)
- Population density calculated based on land area.
- Time zone: UTC−5 (EST)

Las Delicias is a corregimiento in Changuinola District, Bocas del Toro Province, Panama. It has a land area of 206.9 square kilometres (79.9 sq mi) and had a population of 1,484 as of 2010, giving it a population density of 7.2 inhabitants per square kilometre (19/sq mi). It was created by Law 18 of February 26, 2009.
