= Trans-Panama pipeline =

Oil pipeline in Central America

Location
- Country: Panama
- Direction: West-east
- Start: Chiriqui Grande, Bocas del Toro
- To: Charco Azul, Puerto Armuelles, Barú, Chiriquí Province

General information
- Type: Oil
- Partners: Panama Government
- Operator: Petroterminal de Panama S.A.
- Commissioned: 1982

Technical information
- Length: 130 km (81 mi)
- Maximum discharge: 860 thousand barrels per day (137×10^{3} m^{3}/d)

The Trans-Panama Pipeline (Spanish: Oleoducto Chiriqui Bocas del Toro) is an oil pipeline across Panama near the Costa Rican border from the port of Chiriqui Grande, Bocas del Toro on the Caribbean coast to the port of Charco Azul on the Pacific coast.

== History ==
The Trans-Panama Pipeline was opened in 1982 as an alternative to carry crude oil from the Pacific to the Atlantic Ocean. In 1980s in average twenty supertankers, each with a capacity of a million barrels of crude oil, arrived each month at Puerto Armuelles from Valdez in Alaska, for transportation to the Caribbean Sea. Between 1982 and 1996 the pipeline transported 2.7 billion barrels of Alaskan oil to the U.S. Gulf Coast ports. After declining Alaskan oil shipments, the pipeline was closed in 1996. In November 2003, the Trans-Panama pipeline was re-opened for transportation of Ecuadorian crude oil to U.S. Gulf ports.

In 2005, Venezuela began talks about reverse using the pipeline for its oil exports to China. In May 2008, BP signed an agreement with Petroterminal de Panama S.A., according to which the pipeline was modernized and reversed to ship BP's Angolan and other crude oil to the U.S. West Coast refineries. BP acquired 5 million barrels (790×10^{3} m^{3}) of storage capacities and committed to secure shipments of 65 thousand barrels per day (10.3×10^{3} m^{3}/d). On 28 August 2009, Tesoro oil company started reverse oil shipments through the pipeline to supply the Atlantic Basin oil to the Pacific Rim refineries.

On 15 October 2009, Petroterminal de Panama S.A. signed a contract with Chicago Bridge & Iron Company to design and construct the second-phase expansion of terminal storage facilities.

== Technical features ==
The pipeline is 130-kilometre (81 mi) long and it has a capacity of 860 thousand barrels per day (137 thousand cubic metres per day). Its terminal installations are located in Charco Azul Bay, 7 kilometres (4.3 mi) south of Puerto Armuelles, with three docks constructed to receive supertankers, a system to treat ballast water, and three large tanks with a total capacity of 2.5 million barrels (400 thousand cubic metres) of crude oil. From 1979 to 1982, before construction of the pipeline, these facilities were utilized to transfer petroleum from large supertankers (200,000 tons) to smaller tankers (65,000 tons) that could transit the Panama Canal.

== Environmental facts and concerns ==
Many environmental concerns have been considered by scientists and environmental activists. However, PTP has applied little restraint in construction and operations of the pipeline with consideration to the environment. The pipeline project "was approved and completed in 1981–1982 before submission of an environmental impact assessment". The environmental studies were seriously flawed by many omissions in the biotic, and socioeconomic baseline. PTP never placed serious attention to the possibility of oil spills and effects on marine or terrestrial ecosystems. For example, "studies of petroleum hydrocarbons in the marine ecosystems were not performed". Erosion control was minimal and thousands of tons soil were displaced during construction. Many forests, rivers and creeks were damaged or destroyed resulting in negative impact on natural ecosystems. Pipeline construction through the mountains of Fortuna (Boquete and Gualaca) in Central Cordillera was later the base for the construction of the first road from Chiriqui to Bocas del Toro. The road construction was positive in social terms but the environmental impact on virgin forests has resulted in overall biodiversity losses in the Palo Seco Forestal Reserve and buffer area along the coast from Chiriqui Grande to Almirante-Changuinola and Comarca Ngäbe-Bugle.

== Operator ==
The pipeline is owned and operated by Petroterminal de Panama S.A., a joint venture of the Government of Panama and the NIC Holding Corporation located in the town of Melville, on Long Island (NY). The Government of Panama, currently owning 40% of the company, plans to acquire rest of shares in the company.

== See also ==
- Caño Limón
