= Valle de Agua Arriba =

Coordinates: 9.2500°N 82.3831°W

- Corregimiento
- Location within Panama
- Country: Panama
- Province: Bocas del Toro
- District: Changuinola
- Established: February 26, 2009

Area
  - Land: 70.3 km^{2} (27.1 sq mi)

Population (2010)
  - Total: 3,163
  - Density: 45/km^{2} (120/sq mi)
- Population density calculated based on land area.
- Time zone: UTC−5 (EST)
- Climate: Af

Valle de Agua Arriba is a corregimiento in Changuinola District, Bocas del Toro Province, Panama. It has a land area of 70.3 square kilometres (27.1 sq mi) and had a population of 3,163 as of 2010, giving it a population density of 45 inhabitants per square kilometre (120/sq mi). It was created by Law 18 of February 26, 2009.
