= Cochigró =

- Corregimiento
- Interactive map of Cochigró
- Location within Panama
- Coordinates: 9°20′09″N 82°15′16″W
- Country: Panama
- Province: Bocas del Toro
- District: Changuinola
- Established: February 26, 2009

Area
  - Land: 548.9 km^{2} (211.9 sq mi)

Population (2010)
  - Total: 1,812
  - Density: 3.3/km^{2} (8.5/sq mi)
- Population density calculated based on land area.
- Time zone: UTC−5 (EST)

Cochigró is a corregimiento in Changuinola District, Bocas del Toro Province, Panama. It has a land area of 548.9 square kilometres (211.9 sq mi) and had a population of 1,812 as of 2010, giving it a population density of 3.3 inhabitants per square kilometre (8.5/sq mi). It was created by Law 18 of February 26, 2009.
