= Finca 60 =

- Corregimiento
- Interactive map of Finca 60
- Location within Panama
- Coordinates: 9°27′15″N 82°29′14″W
- Country: Panama
- Provinces: Bocas del Toro
- District: Changuinola
- Time zone: UTC−5 (EST)

Finca 60 is a corregimiento in Bocas del Toro Province in the Republic of Panama.
