= Barriada Guaymí =

- Corregimiento
- Interactive map of Barriada Guaymí
- Country: Panama
- Province: Bocas del Toro Province
- District: Changuinola
- Time zone: UTC−5 (EST)

Barriada Guaymí is a corregimiento in Bocas del Toro Province in the Republic of Panama.
