= Miramar, Bocas del Toro =

Miramar
- Corregimiento and town
- Location within Panama
- Coordinates: 9°0′N 82°15′W
- Country: Panama
- Province: Bocas del Toro
- District: Chiriquí
- Established: March 7, 1997

Area
  - Land: 26.9 km^{2} (10.4 sq mi)

Population (2010)
  - Total: 1,232
  - Density: 45.8/km^{2} (119/sq mi)
- Population density calculated based on land area.
- Time zone: UTC−5 (EST)

Miramar is a corregimiento in Chiriquí Grande District, Bocas del Toro Province, Panama. It has a land area of 26.9 square kilometres (10.4 sq mi) and had a population of 1,232 as of 2010, giving it a population density of 45.8 inhabitants per square kilometre (119/sq mi). It was created by Law 10 of March 7, 1997; this measure was complemented by Law 5 of January 19, 1998 and Law 69 of October 28, 1998. Its population as of 2000 was 912.
