= Barrio Francés =

- Corregimiento
- Interactive map of Barrio Francés
- Country: Panama
- Provinces: Bocas del Toro
- District: Almirante
- Time zone: UTC−5 (EST)

Barrio Francés is a corregimiento in Bocas del Toro Province in the Republic of Panama.

== Main Structures ==
- Almirante Elementary School
- Baptist Church
- Catholic Church
- Chiquita Banana port.
- Colegio Parroquial San Jose
- Colón Island ferry dock
- Cincuentenario Park
- National Bank of Panama branch with only ATM in town.
- Postal Office
- Sea Wall

== Neighborhoods ==
- Avenida del Puerto "Port Avenue"
- Barrio Francés
- El Parque "The Park"
- La Escuela "The School"
- La Loma "The Hill"
- La Zona "Residential Zone"
- Las Golondrinas "Swallow Fields"
- Patua Town
- Tampico
