= Bajo Cedro =

- Corregimiento
- Interactive map of Bajo Cedro
- Location within Panama
- Coordinates: 9°06′00″N 82°17′00″W
- Country: Panama
- Province: Bocas del Toro
- District: Chiriquí Grande
- Established: February 26, 2009

Area
  - Land: 20.4 km^{2} (7.9 sq mi)

Population (2010)
  - Total: 1,404
  - Density: 68.9/km^{2} (178/sq mi)
- Population density calculated based on land area.
- Time zone: UTC−5 (EST)

Bajo Cedro is a corregimiento in Chiriquí Grande District, Bocas del Toro Province, Panama. It has a land area of 20.4 square kilometres (7.9 sq mi) and had a population of 1,404 as of 2010, giving it a population density of 68.9 inhabitants per square kilometre (178/sq mi). It was created by Law 18 of February 26, 2009.
