= 2003 Puerto Armuelles earthquake =

Earthquake affecting Panama and Costa Rica

- Location within Central America
- UTC time: 2003-12-25 07:11:11
- ISC event: 7216954
- USGS-ANSS: ComCat
- Local date: December 25, 2003
- Local time: 02:11
- Magnitude: 6.5 M_{w}
- Depth: 33 km (21 mi)
- Epicenter: 8.416°N 82.824°W
- Type: Strike-slip
- Max. intensity: MMI VIII (Severe)
- Casualties: 2 dead 75 injured

The 2003 Puerto Armuelles earthquake occurred on December 25 at 02:11 local time (07:11 UTC). The epicenter was located in Panama, at about 7 km east of Puerto Armuelles, near the Panama-Costa Rica border. The earthquake had a magnitude of M_{w} 6.5. Two people were reported dead in Puerto Armuelles. There was building damage in Panama and Costa Rica. Power outage lasted for about four hours in Puerto Armuelles. The maximal intensity was MM VIII in Finca Naranjo, Costa Rica. The intensity was MM VII in Armuelles, Panama, and MM IV in Limón and the Central Valley, Costa Rica, including San José. This earthquake could also be felt in Panama City.

== See also ==
- List of earthquakes in 2003
- List of earthquakes in Costa Rica
- List of earthquakes in Panama
