= Finca 30 =

- Corregimiento
- Interactive map of Finca 30
- Location within Panama
- Coordinates: 9°26′N 82°33′W
- Country: Panama
- Provinces: Bocas del Toro
- District: Changuinola
- Time zone: UTC−5 (EST)

Finca 30 is a corregimiento in Bocas del Toro Province in the Republic of Panama.
