= Punta Peña =

- Corregimiento and town
- Location within Panama
- Coordinates: 8°55′N 82°11′W
- Country: Panama
- Province: Bocas del Toro
- District: Chiriquí Grande District
- Established: March 7, 1997

Area
  - Land: 19.4 km^{2} (7.5 sq mi)

Population (2010)
  - Total: 2,520
  - Density: 130/km^{2} (340/sq mi)
- Population density calculated based on land area.
- Time zone: UTC−5 (EST)

Punta Peña is a corregimiento in Chiriquí Grande District, Bocas del Toro Province, Panama. It has a land area of 19.4 square kilometres (7.5 sq mi) and had a population of 2,520 as of 2010, giving it a population density of 130 inhabitants per square kilometre (340/sq mi). It was created by Law 10 of March 7, 1997; this measure was complemented by Law 5 of January 19, 1998 and Law 69 of October 28, 1998. Its population as of 2000 was 1,730.
