= Costa Rica–Panama border =

International border

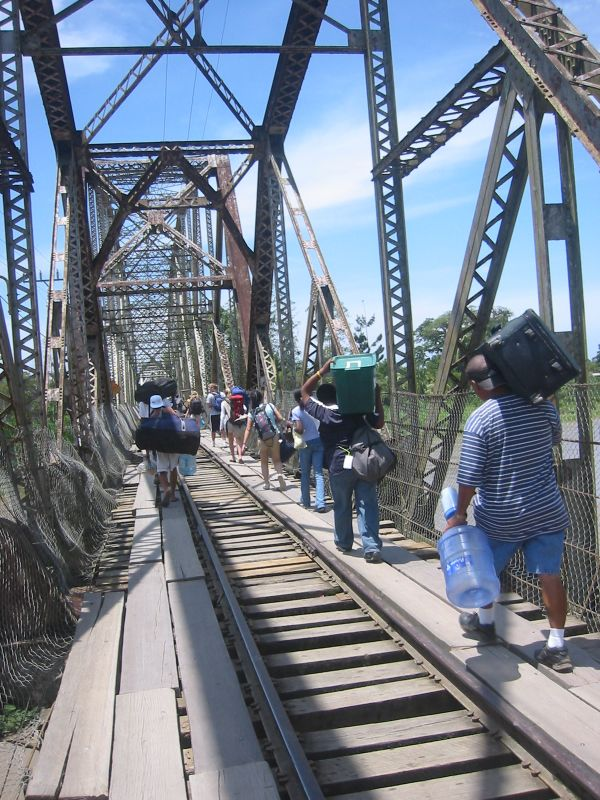
A railway bridge on the Sixaola River, between Guabito, Panama and Sixaola, Costa Rica.

The border between Costa Rica and Panama is 348 km (216 mi) long. The border in its present state is demarcated by the Echandi-Fernandez Treaty of 1941.

The border between the two countries runs between the Pacific and Caribbean coasts, through the Cordillera Central. The Echandi-Fernandez Treaty defined the current border as follows:

- It begins at the mouth of the Sixaola River in the Caribbean Sea, following the valley of this river to its influx in the Yorkin River.
- Thence continuing upriver on the bottom of the river valley up to the parallel in the length 9°30'N.
- Then continuing in a straight line to the meridian at 82°58'10"W.
- From there it continues south along this meridian to the summit of the Cordillera de Talamanca, which separates the Caribbean waters and Pacific waters.
- It follows this ridge to Mount Pano where it meets the ridge that divides the waters of the tributaries of the Golfo Dulce and the Charco Azul Bay.
- From here it follows the ridge until the end of Punta Burica on the Pacific Ocean.

== See also ==
- Costa Rica–Panama relations
