= Costa Rica–Panama relations =

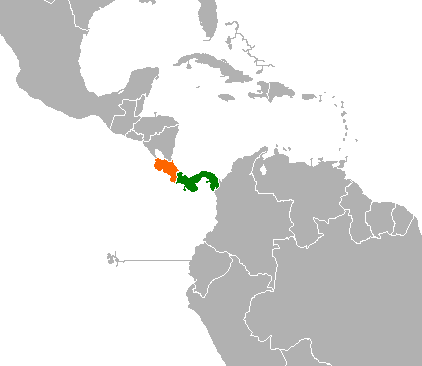

- Panama: Costa Rica

Costa Rica–Panama relations are the bilateral relations between Costa Rica and Panama. Costa Rica has an embassy in Panama City. Panama has an embassy in San José. Both countries are members of the Central American Integration System, Community of Latin American and Caribbean States, Organization of American States, and the Organization of Ibero-American States.

== History ==
=== 21st Century ===
In October 2023, Costa Rica and Panama came to a bilateral agreement to transport migrants who had crossed the Darien Gap in Panama (and who could afford the fee) directly to the Temporary Migrant Care Center by bus.

In February 2025, both countries agreed to receive deportation flights carrying migrants from China, Afghanistan, Pakistan, and other nations as part of U.S. President Donald Trump’s crackdown on undocumented immigration. Analysts suggest the agreements were influenced by political pressure and tariff threats from the USA. Costa Rica’s President Rodrigo Chaves described the move as assisting a "powerful northern ally," while Panama faced pressure over the Panama Canal. Deportees were temporarily detained in both countries before repatriation, though many feared returning to their countries of origin.

== See also ==
- Coto War
- Costa Rica–Panama border
- Foreign relations of Costa Rica
- Foreign relations of Panama
