= Charco Azul =

Bay in Panama

Charco Azul near Puerto Armuelles and next to Costa Rica

Charco Azul is a bay and port just outside Puerto Armuelles, in the southwest corner of Panama near the border with Costa Rica. It lies just to the east of the Burica Peninsula, and forms part of the larger Gulf of Chiriquí.

Charco Azul translates to "blue ditch/puddle." This name comes from its steep slope off the shore, where the continental shelf is extremely thin. A few meters into the Pacific Ocean, the water is already about 200 m deep.

Because of this depth, engineers chose Charco Azul as the site of a port for use by supertankers. As the dock is only 300 feet long, many captains of these supertankers worried that they would run aground, but the water is deep enough to support the largest ones. In fact, one can see deepwater fish swimming just underneath the dock.

Since the late 1970s, Charco Azul has unloaded oil from Alaska to be shipped to the refineries of Houston and the Gulf coast of the United States. Originally it was a stopping spot for supertankers to unload and Panamax tankers to load to carry the oil across the Panama Canal. In 1982, the Trans-Panama pipeline was commissioned to transport the oil across to isthmus, with Charco Azul at the southern end. The pipeline was closed in 1996 as Alaskan oil shipments declined, but it began being used in the reverse direction in 2009 to ship crude oil to Pacific Rim refineries.
