= Sixaola River =

River in Costa Rica and Panama

Río Sixaola
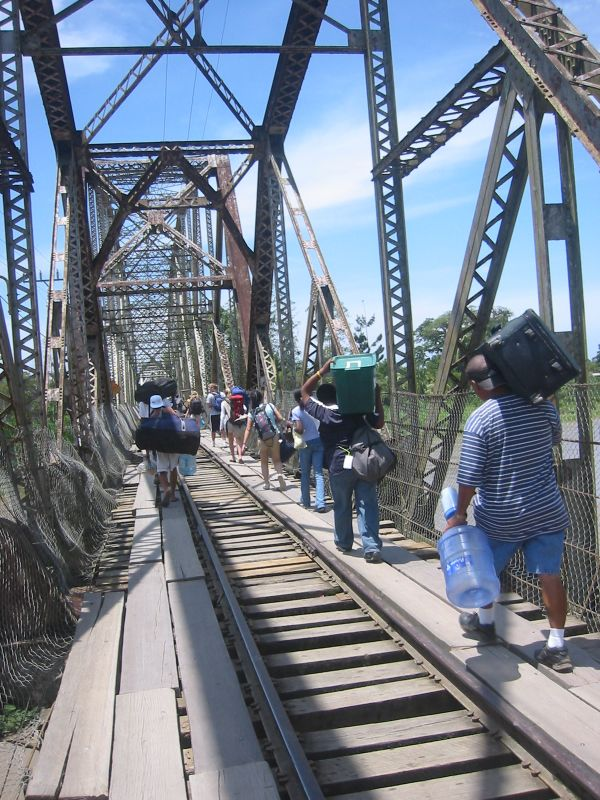
- Crossing the river at the Panama border. This bridge doesn't exist anymore.

- Location of mouth

Location
- Countries: Costa Rica; Panama

Physical characteristics
- Source: Cordillera Talamanca
  - location: La Amistad International Park, Limón Province, Costa Rica
- Mouth
  - location: Caribbean Sea, Costa Rica
  - coordinates: 9°34′20″N 82°33′54″W

The Sixaola River (Spanish: Río Sixaola) is a river in southern Limón Province, Costa Rica. It flows from the Cordillera Talamanca to the Caribbean Sea northeast of Sixaola at 9°34′20″N 82°33′54″W. The river's headwaters are part of the La Amistad International Park. For part of its length, the river forms the border between Limón Province, Costa Rica and Bocas del Toro Province, Panama.

An old railroad bridge that collapsed in 2017 spanned the river between Guabito, Panama, and Sixaola, Costa Rica. This bridge was a border crossing between Costa Rica and Panama and used by pedestrians when traveling between Costa Rica and Bocas del Toro. This bridge has now been dismantled.

A new binational road bridge has been in construction next to the place of the old railway bridge, and will open in 2020. It will be the end point of National Route 36 in Costa Rica and Route 1001 in Panama.

The Rio Sixaola is also the boundary between the UTC−06:00 (Central) and UTC−05:00 (Eastern) Time Zones. Costa Rica is one hour behind Panama. Route 36 ends in Sixaola. Sixaola is right across the river from Guabito, Panama.
