= Changuinola River =

River in Panama

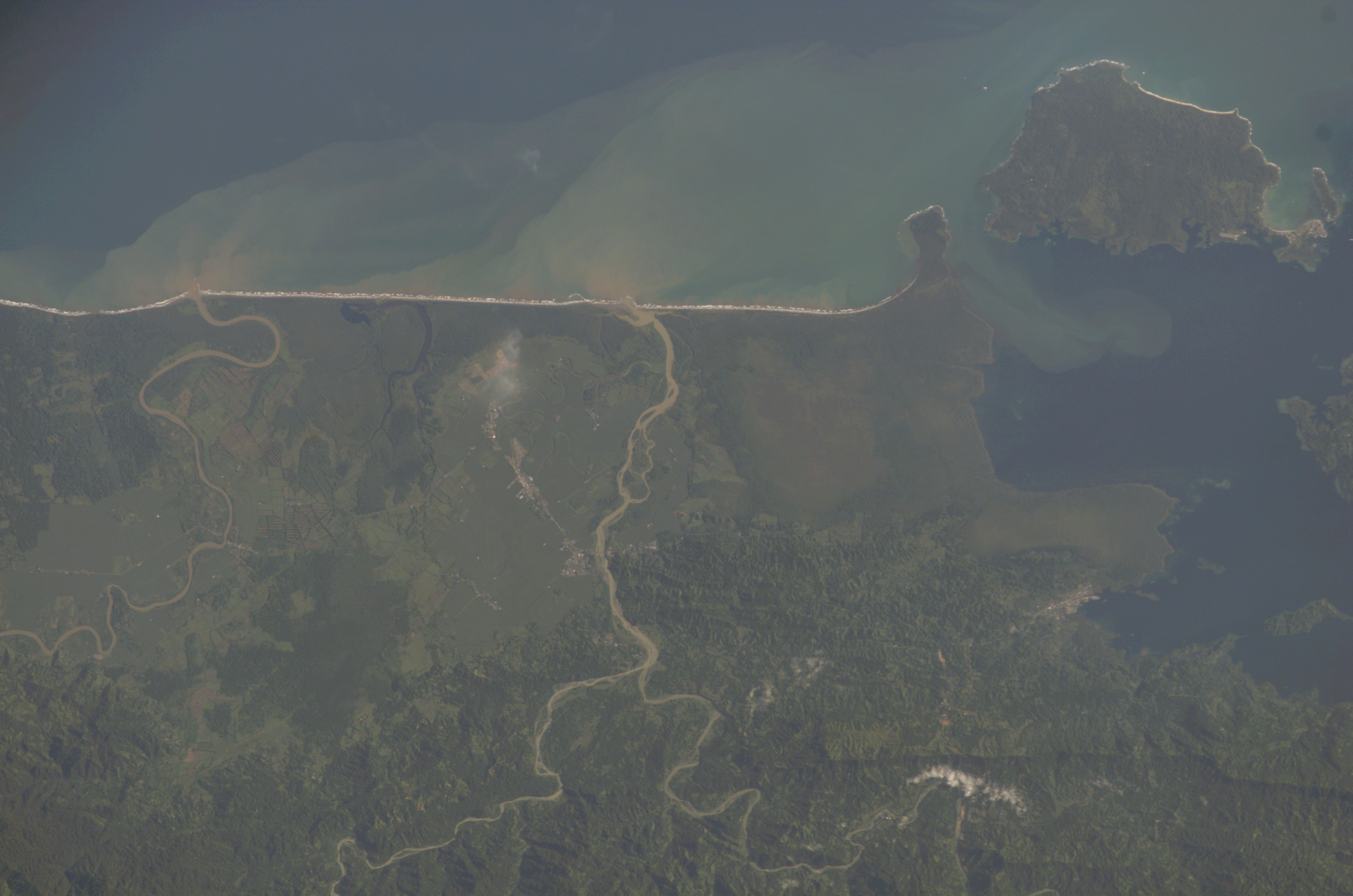

- Location of mouth

Location
- Country: Panama

Physical characteristics
- Mouth
  - location: Caribbean Sea
  - coordinates: 9.4667°N 82.4500°W
  - elevation: 0 m (0 ft)

The Changuinola River is a river of Panama. The polygamous Guaymí have lived on the Teraria or Tilorio which is the main branch of the Changuinola River inside Panama and on the headwaters of the Térraba River across the border in Costa Rica. The Changuinola River was impounded by AES Corporation for a hydroelectric project in the Bocas del Toro Province. The riparian land near the mouth of the river hosts extensive banana agriculture.

== See also ==
- List of rivers of Panama
