= Almirante, Bocas del Toro =

Almirante Carambarú
- Corregimiento and town
- Interactive map of Almirante
- Location within Panama
- Coordinates: 9°18′N 82°24′W
- Country: Panama
- Province: Bocas del Toro Province
- District: Changuinola

Area
  - Land: 95.4 km^{2} (36.8 sq mi)

Population (2010)
  - Total: 12,731
  - Density: 133.5/km^{2} (346/sq mi)
- Population density calculated based on land area.
- Time zone: UTC−5 (EST)

Almirante is the capital of the Almirante District of the Bocas del Toro Province in the Republic of Panama. Its name is Spanish for admiral.

== History ==
Almirante was built by the United Fruit Company at the beginning of the 20th century as a port for its banana exports. The area consisted of landfills on swamps. Almirante hosted UFCO's head office until 1970. Its first settlers were mostly black Jamaicans and the Lesser Antilles who moved to work on the banana plantations in the early 1900s. Due to the importance of the port of Almirante, it also attracted Chinese, Hindu and Jewish merchants in the early 1950s; Since 2002, a massive migration of Chinese entered the entire province, so it is normal to see them in their businesses. Almirante was hit by a strong earthquake on April 22, 1991, wooden houses were mostly destroyed, so the Government decided to build new houses on the outskirts.

== Geography ==
Almirante has a land area of 95.4 square kilometres (36.8 sq mi) and average altitude of 15 meters; and it´s surrounded by the Ambrossian Bight with calm waters.

== Demographics ==
Population of 12,731 as of 2010, giving it a population density of 133.5 inhabitants per square kilometre (346/sq mi). Its population as of 1990 was 11,584; its population as of 2000 was 12,430.
Since Bocas del Toro Province has a vast indigenous population, they also migrated to Almirante replacing blacks as the major ethnic group.
Spoken languages are: English, Spanish, native indigenous languages and Guari-Guari.

== Locations ==
- Wards: Barriada Aeropuerto, Barriada Guaymí, Barriada San Agustín, Barrio Francés, Las Golondrinas, Las Vegas, Media Milla, Una Milla y Zegla.
- Villages: Milla 3, Milla 5, Miraflores, Nuevo Paraíso, Ojo de Agua and Río Oeste.
- Interest sites: Port of Almirante, "Sea Wall" area, Cincuentenario Park, Catholic Church, Anglican Church and Ojo de Agua mountain village.

As result of the creation of the District of Almirante in 2015, neighborhoods and nearby communities were combined to form new corregimientos of the district.

== Economic activity ==
Currently the main economic activities are agricultural: cocoa crops, bananas and livestock; operations in the Port of Almirante have been reduced to a minimum, causing many to move to Panama City or mining projects in Coclé Province in search of new job sources. In 2010, a hydroelectric plant operated by AES was built in the mountainous area of Almirante District, which has little impact on the city's economy.

== Transportation ==
=== Roads ===
Main roads around the city:

- Almirante - Changuinola
- Almirante - Rambala
- Almirante - Las Millas - Changuinola (former railway)
- Almirante - Ojo de Agua - Charco de la Pava Way

=== Ports ===
- Port Almirante (operated by Chiquita Panamá).
- Port of Almirante (Ferry dock for Colón Island).
- Water taxis stations (3).

=== Bus terminals ===
- Sincotavecop Terminal (located in the center of the city, for buses to Changuinola and nearby communities).
- Tranceibosa Terminal (located on the outskirts of the city, in the area known as "El Cruce"), for buses to Panama City and David.

For travelers, Almirante is mainly a jumping-off point for land travel to other cities on the mainland, Panama or Costa Rica. It is an approximately 30-minute water taxi ride from Colón Island. private shuttle services to Boquete. Additionally shuttle services exist between Puerto Viejo de Talamanca and Bocas del Toro passing through Almirante.

=== Railways ===
The United Fruit Company and later Chiquita operated a now-abandoned narrow gauge railway that transported bananas between Changuonola plantations and Port Almirante.

== Sports ==
=== Venues ===
- Basketball court in Una Milla, (roofed).
- Soccer pitch in Barrio Francés, (artificial turf)
- Soccer pitch in Miraflores, (artificial turf)
- Soccer pitch in Nuevo Paraiso, (artificial turf)
- Baseball Stadium Myric, (natural grass, ongoing reconstruction).

=== Sports figures ===
- Fernando Seguignol, former professional baseball player.
- Ivan Murrell, was a former professional baseball player.

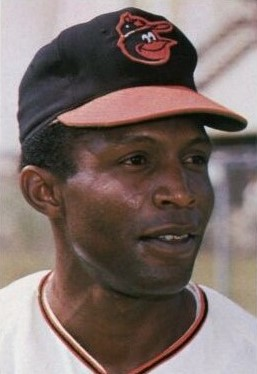
Ruthford "Chico" Salmon wearing Baltimore Orioles uniform.

- Ruthford "Chico" Salmon, was a former professional baseball player.
