= Las Tablas, Bocas del Toro =

Las Tablas
- Corregimiento and town
- Interactive map of Las Tablas
- Location within Panama Location within North America
- Coordinates: 9°32′35″N 82°44′19″W
- Country: Panama
- Province: Bocas del Toro
- District: Changuinola
- Established: April 30, 2003

Area
  - Land: 97.3 km^{2} (37.6 sq mi)

Population (2010)
  - Total: 9,286
  - Density: 95.4/km^{2} (247/sq mi)
- Population density calculated based on land area.
- Time zone: UTC-5 (ETZ)
- Climate: Af

Las Tablas is a town and corregimiento in the Changuinola District of Bocas del Toro Province of Panama. It has a land area of 97.3 square kilometres (37.6 sq mi) and had a population of 9,286 as of 2010, giving it a population density of 95.4 inhabitants per square kilometre (247/sq mi). It was created by Law 40 of April 30, 2003.
