= Pedro Miguel Fault =

Seismic fault beneath the Panama canal

The Pedro Miguel Fault is a seismic fault that runs beneath the Panama Canal and near Panama City, home to approximately 2.1 million of Panama's approximately 4.3 million inhabitants.

== Seismic activity ==
The Pedro Miguel Fault and nearby Limón Fault are both active, cause earthquakes every 600 to 900 years, and could cause ground slippage of up to 9.8 feet (3.0 m). An earthquake in 1882 caused a regional tsunami. A team of seismologists led by Tom Rockwell of San Diego State University found evidence suggesting both faults slipped simultaneously around 700 CE.

=== Potential consequences of an earthquake ===
The Pedro Miguel and the Limón Fault system are a concern for geologists, as a strong earthquake centered on either could damage the canal, drain the lake that supplies water for the operation of its locks, Lago Gatun, and cause severe damage in the capital.
