= Chiriquí Grande =

- Corregimiento and town
- Location within Panama
- Coordinates: 8°57′0″N 82°7′12″W
- Country: Panama
- Province: Bocas del Toro
- Established: March 7, 1997

Area
  - Land: 26.9 km^{2} (10.4 sq mi)

Population (2010)
  - Total: 1,232
  - Density: 45.8/km^{2} (119/sq mi)
- Population density calculated based on land area.
- Time zone: UTC−5 (EST)

Chiriquí Grande is a corregimiento in Chiriquí Grande District, Bocas del Toro Province, Panama. It is the seat of Chiriquí Grande District. It has a land area of 58.8 square kilometres (22.7 sq mi) and had a population of 3,014 as of 2010, giving it a population density of 51.2 inhabitants per square kilometre (133/sq mi). Its population as of 1990 was 7,637; its population as of 2000 was 2,069. The town is located on the southern shore of Chiriquí Lagoon and its port serves as the northern terminus of the Trans-Panama pipeline.
