= El Empalme, Bocas del Toro =

El Empalme
- Corregimiento and town
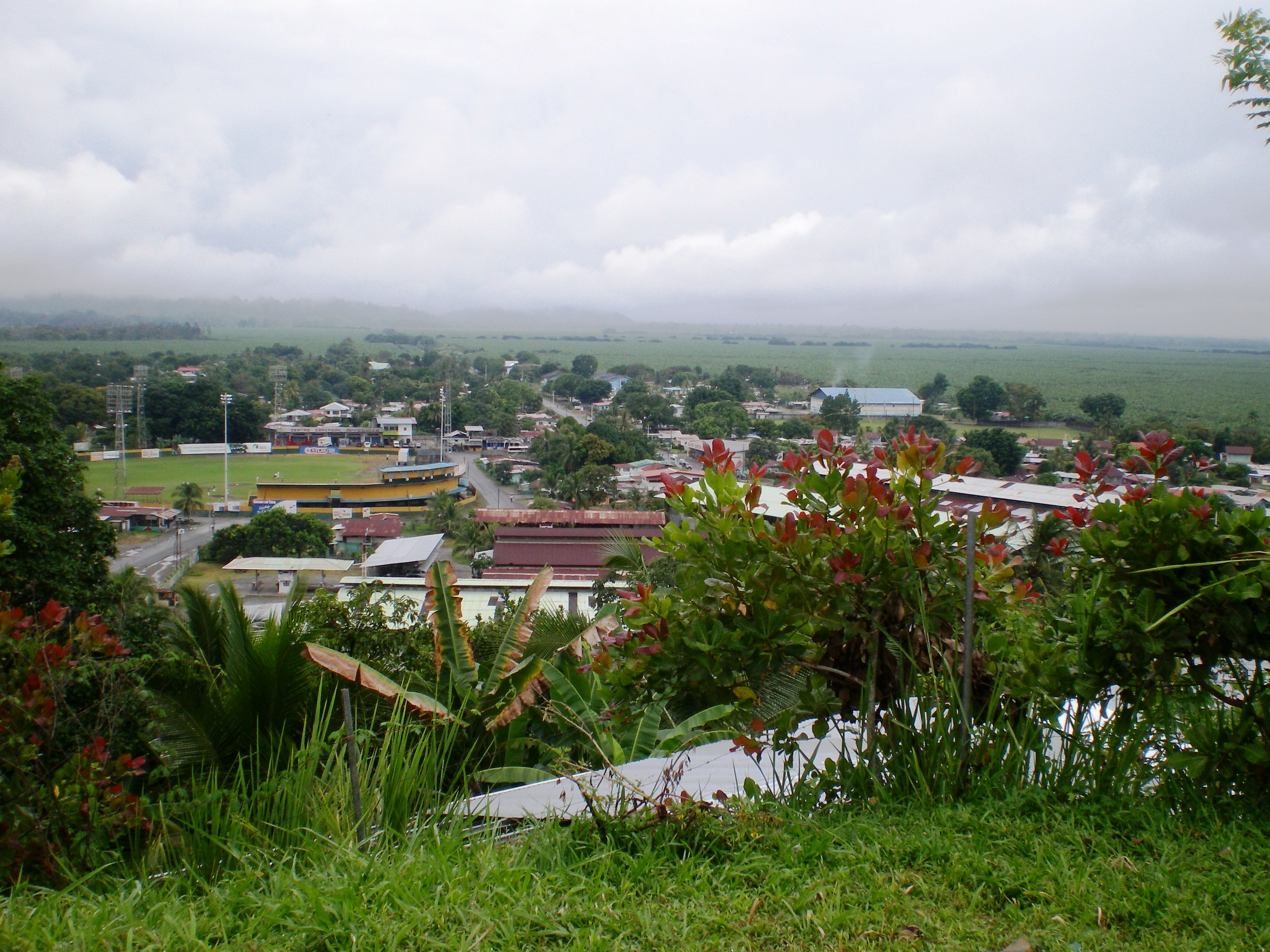
- Interactive map of El Empalme
- Location within Panama
- Coordinates: 9°25′N 82°31′W
- Country: Panama
- Province: Bocas del Toro
- District: Changuinola District
- Established: April 30, 2003

Area
  - Land: 79.5 km^{2} (30.7 sq mi)

Population (2010)
  - Total: 18,653
  - Density: 234.7/km^{2} (608/sq mi)
- Population density calculated based on land area.
- Time zone: UTC-5 (ETZ)

El Empalme is a town and corregimiento in the Changuinola District of Bocas del Toro Province of Panama. It has a land area of 79.5 square kilometres (30.7 sq mi) and had a population of 18,653 as of 2010, giving it a population density of 234.7 inhabitants per square kilometre (608/sq mi). It was created by Law 40 of April 30, 2003.
