= Sixaola =

District in Talamanca canton, Limón province, Costa Rica

- District
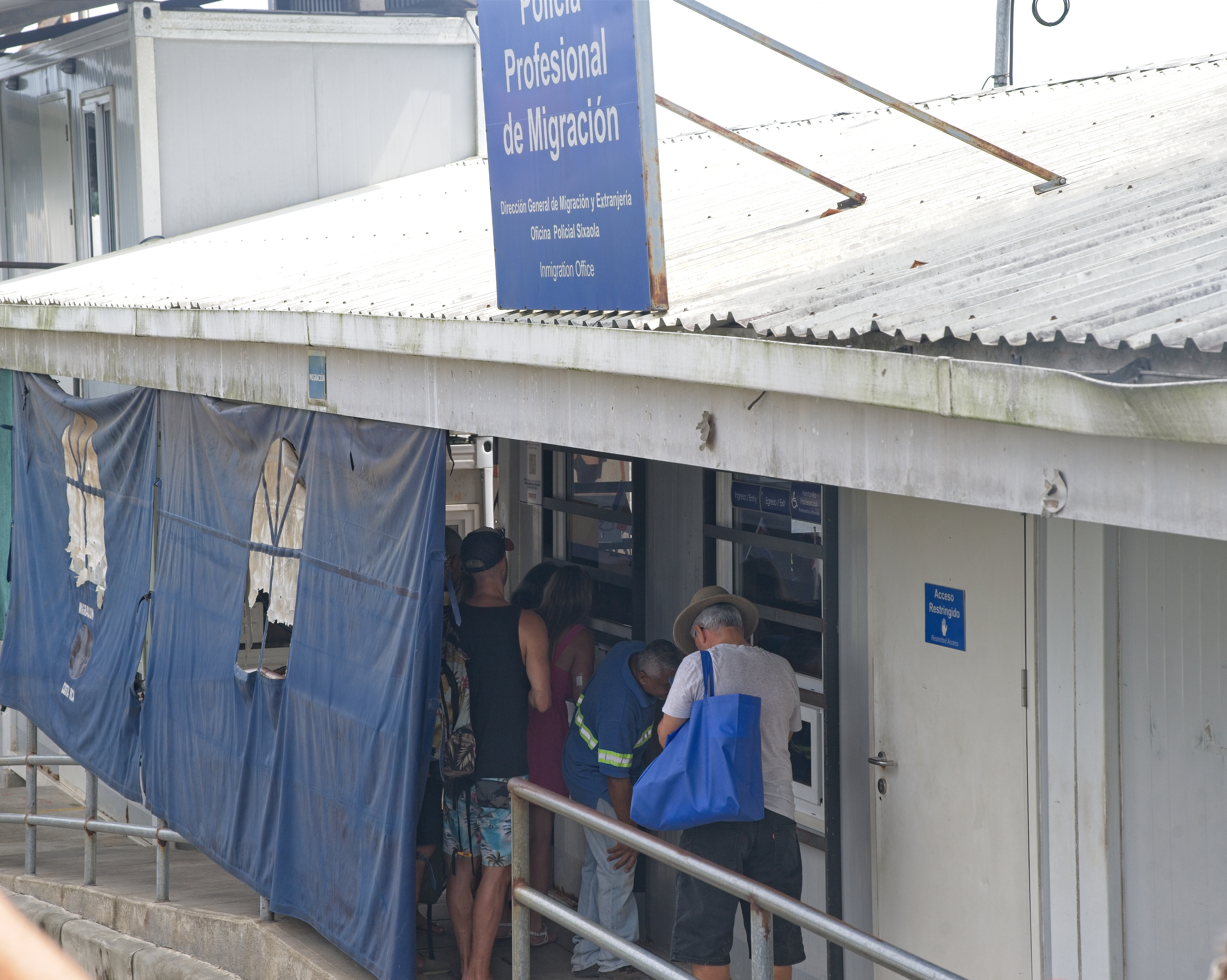
- Sixaola district
- Sixaola district location in Costa Rica
- Coordinates: 9.5578991°N 82.6697806°W
- Country: Costa Rica
- Province: Limón
- Canton: Talamanca
- Creation: 19 February 1970

Government
  - Syndic: Ruperto Rojas Torres (PLN)
  - Substitutle syndic: Sandra Yenory Vargas Badilla

Area
  - Total: 169.32 km^{2} (65.37 sq mi)
- Elevation: 10 m (33 ft)

Population (2011)
  - Total: 8,861
  - Density: 52.33/km^{2} (135.5/sq mi)
- Time zone: UTC−06:00
- Postal code: 70402

Sixaola is a district of the Talamanca canton, in the Limón province of Costa Rica. It is a border town together with Guabito, Panama. Sixaola is right across the Sixaola River from Guabito, Panama.

== History ==
Sixaola was created on 19 February 1970 by Decreto Ejecutivo 13.

== Geography ==
Sixaola has an area of 169.32 km^{2} and an elevation of 10 metres.

== Locations ==
- Poblados: Ania, Boca Sixaola, Catarina, Celia, Daytonia, Gandoca, Margarita, Mata de Limón, Noventa y Seis, Palma, Paraíso, Parque, San Miguel, San Miguelito, San Rafael, Virginia, Zavala.

== Demographics ==
Historical population
Census	Pop.	±% p.a.
1973	1,096	—
1984	3,462	+11.02%
2000	10,234	+7.01%
2011	8,861	−1.30%
2022	13,961	+4.22%
Source: Instituto Nacional de Estadística y Censos; Centro Centroamericano de Población

For the 2011 census, Sixaola had a population of 8,861 inhabitants. The surrounding area is home to the Bribri Indians.

== Transportation ==
=== Road transportation ===
The district is covered by the following road routes:

- National Route 36

Route 36 goes onward to Panama, where it becomes Panama Route 1001.

== Economy ==
=== Tourism ===
Tourists pass through Sixaola and Guabito along a road connecting destinations in Limón Province, Costa Rica and Bocas del Toro Province, Panama. The road is an old elevated railroad grade. A former railroad bridge crosses the Rio Sixaola at the border. Costa Rican customs is located at the west end of the bridge just down some stairs from the elevated railroad grade. When crossing the border in either direction, tourists must clear both Costa Rican and Panamanian customs. Entry and exit visas are required. Panamanian customs is located alongside the elevated railroad grade right at the east end of the bridge.

The border towns have no accommodations, restaurants, or services. In Costa Rica, Puerto Viejo offers the closest accommodations, restaurants, and services to the border. In Panama, Changuinola offers accommodations, restaurants, and services about 10 km (6 mi) from the border. Buses and taxis wait on both sides of the border.

== Image gallery ==
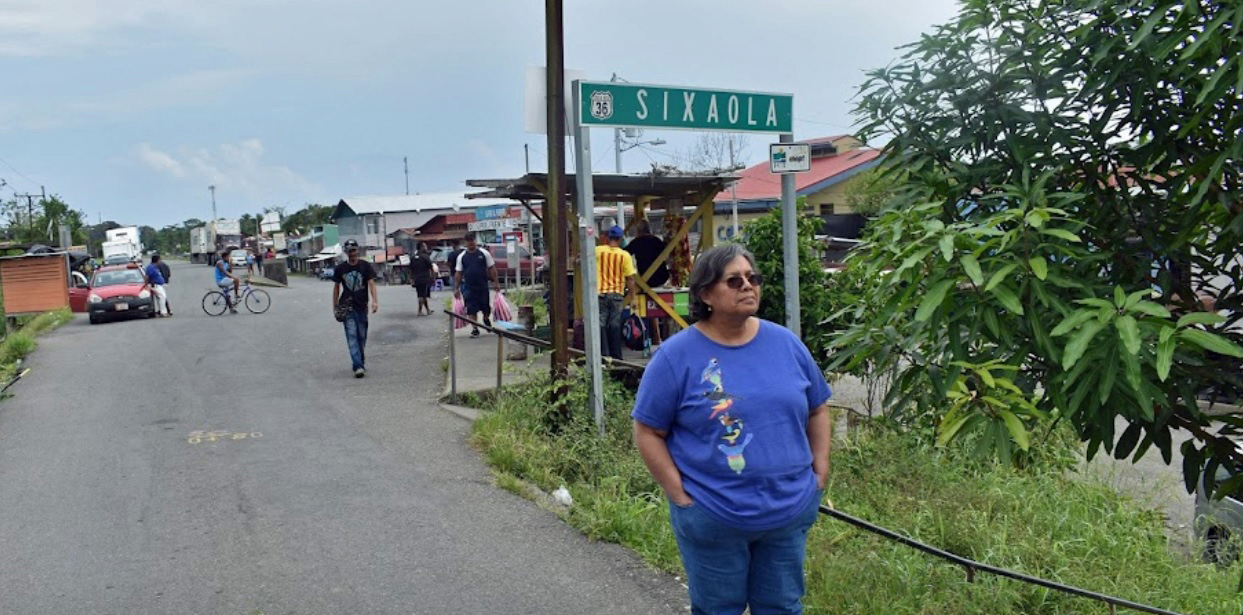
Entrance to Sixaola
