= Bocas del Toro Province =

Province of Panama

Bocas del Toro Province Provincia de Bocas del Toro
- Province
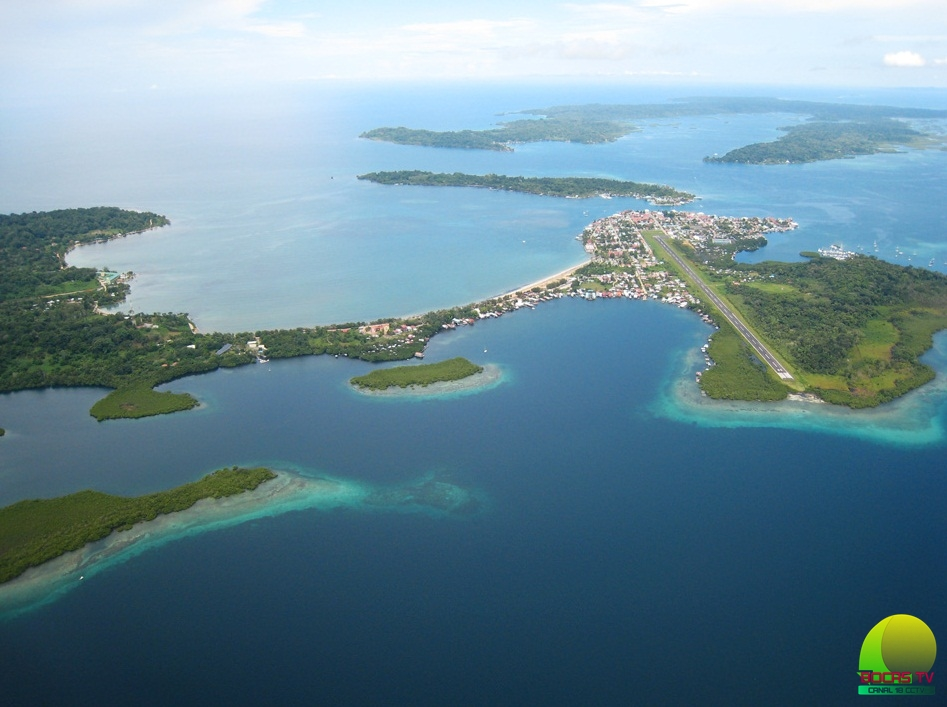
- Isla Colón

- Flag

- Location of Bocas del Toro in Panama
- Coordinates (Seat of Government): 9°20′26″N 82°14′26″W
- Country: Panama
- Founded: 1903
- Capital: Bocas del Toro

Area
  - Total: 4,657.2 km^{2} (1,798.2 sq mi)

Population (2023 census)
  - Total: 159,228
  - Density: 34.190/km^{2} (88.551/sq mi)
- Census

GDP (PPP, constant 2015 values)
  - Year: 2023
  - Total: $2.7 billion
  - Per capita: $15,700
- Time zone: UTC-5 (Eastern Time)
- ISO 3166 code: PA-1
- HDI (2017): 0.719 high
- Website: bocasdeltoro.com
- Google Earth, Statiods

Bocas del Toro (Spanish pronunciation: [ˈbokas ðel ˈtoɾo]; meaning "Mouths of the Bull") is a province of Panama. Its area is 4,643.9 square kilometers, comprising the mainland and nine main islands. The province consists of the Bocas del Toro Archipelago, Almirante Bay, Chiriquí Lagoon, and adjacent mainland. The capital is the city of Bocas del Toro (or Bocas Town) on Colón Island. Other major cities or towns include Almirante and Changuinola. The province has a population of 159,228 as of 2023.

Christopher Columbus and his crew first visited the area in 1502. Bocas del Toro borders the Caribbean Sea to the north, Limón Province of Costa Rica and the Naso Tjër Di Comarca to the west, Chiriquí Province to the south, and Ngöbe-Buglé Comarca to the east. The Río Sixaola forms part of the border with Costa Rica. A newly constructed bridge spans the river between Guabito and Sixaola, Costa Rica. The bridge is a border crossing used by tourists going between destinations in Bocas del Toro and Costa Rica.

The province contains two national parks, Isla Bastimentos National Marine Park and La Amistad International Park. The Smithsonian Tropical Research Institute operates a research station on Colón Island just northwest of Bocas Town. There are many banana plantations in Bocas del Toro, often called the oro verde, or green gold of Central America.

== History ==
Christopher Columbus explored the area in 1502 while searching for the passage to the Pacific Ocean. Columbus's original name for the island was Isla del Drago. In colonial times, Bocas del Toro was part of Veraguas. It was originally part of Costa Rica until, in one of many territorial disputes, Colombia took control of it with armed forces. The then government made a reservation called Bocas del Toro in 1834. In 1850, Bocas del Toro became a part of Chiriqui, then was separated from it and became part of Colon. On November 16, 1903, Bocas del Toro was separated from Colon and became its own province. In 1941, Bocas del Toro was divided into two districts, Bocas del Toro and Crimamola. Four years later, it became part of the same division as before. In 1970, Bocas del Toro district became Changuinola, the district of Bastimentos was eliminated, and three new districts were added, making the province what it is today. The districts' areas changed in 1997 when the Ngöbe-Buglé Comarca was created and again in 2020, when the Naso Tjër Di Comarca was established, which had been proposed since 2005. Demarcation of indigenous territory is continuing within the province.

The province is the home of the unique Bocas del Toro Creole of English.

== Administrative divisions ==
Bocas del Toro Province is divided into four districts and 40 corregimientos. On 8 June 2015 the new Almirante District was created, after splitting out from Changuinola District.

District	Establishment	Surface area	Corregimientos (Subdivisions)	Cabecera (Seat)
Almirante District	2015	^{*}	Puerto Almirante, Barriada Guaymí, Barrio Francés, Nance de Risco, Valle del Risco, Valle de Agua Arriba, Miraflores, Bajo Culubre, Cauchero, Ceiba	Puerto Almirante
Bocas del Toro District	1855	430 km^{2}	Bocas del Toro, Bastimentos, Punta Laurel, Tierra Oscura, Bocas del Drago, San Cristóbal	Bocas del Toro
Changuinola District	1903	3,995 km^{2}	Changuinola, Barriada 4 de Abril, Cochigró, El Empalme, El Silencio, Finca 30, Finca 6, Finca 60, Guabito, La Gloria, Las Delicias, Las Tablas, Finca 66, Finca 4, Finca 51, Finca 12, La Mesa, Barranco Adentro	Changuinola
Chiriquí Grande District	1970	207 km^{2}	Chiriquí Grande, Bajo Cedro, Miramar, Punta Peña, Punta Robalo, Rambala	Chiriquí Grande

^{*} The area of Almirante District is included in the figure quoted for Changuinola District, from which Almirante was divided.

== Geography ==
=== Climate ===
Climate data for Bocas del Toro (1971–2000)
Month	Jan	Feb	Mar	Apr	May	Jun	Jul	Aug	Sep	Oct	Nov	Dec	Year
Mean daily maximum °C (°F)	30.8 (87.4)	30.7 (87.3)	31.0 (87.8)	31.4 (88.5)	31.9 (89.4)	32.0 (89.6)	31.5 (88.7)	31.8 (89.2)	31.9 (89.4)	31.7 (89.1)	31.6 (88.9)	31.0 (87.8)	31.4 (88.6)
Mean daily minimum °C (°F)	20.4 (68.7)	20.2 (68.4)	20.5 (68.9)	21.4 (70.5)	22.2 (72.0)	22.2 (72.0)	21.7 (71.1)	21.8 (71.2)	22.0 (71.6)	22.0 (71.6)	21.8 (71.2)	20.6 (69.1)	21.4 (70.5)
Average precipitation mm (inches)	123.9 (4.88)	266.1 (10.48)	83.8 (3.30)	369.1 (14.53)	178.3 (7.02)	259 (10.2)	420.1 (16.54)	440.7 (17.35)	311.2 (12.25)	150.5 (5.93)	291.7 (11.48)	563.6 (22.19)	3,458 (136.15)
Average precipitation days	16.6	14.6	14.8	15.2	16.7	17.9	20.9	18.4	15.8	16.4	17	20.0	204.3
Source: World Meteorological Organization

Bocas del Toro is a travel destination that is most known for its vibrant culture, beaches, rainforests, and surfing. It is estimated that 95% of the economy in Bocas del Toro is based on tourism. The most popular destinations in Bocas del Toro are the Zapatilla Islands, the Bastimentos National Marine Park, Starfish Beach, Red Frog Beach, Bluff Beach, and Hospital Point.

The High-Season for tourism in Bocas del Toro is from November to April, which also coincides with the dry season as well as the being the best surf season. The best months to visit Bocas del Toro for dry weather are January, February, March, May, September, and October. These are statistically the driest months of the year. However, dry weather is also common in June, August, November, and even the wettest month of the year, December, can see weeks without rain.

Common activities in Bocas del Toro include surfing, scuba diving, exploring bat caves, learning about the local indigenous cultures, cacao farm tours, hiking, and nightlife.

Bocas del Toro is known for the abundance of newly constructed overwater bungalow hotels. Over the next decade, it has been described as a competitor to the Maldives and Tahiti.

== Protected areas ==
The national parks in the province are Isla Bastimentos National Marine Park (Parque Nacional Marino Isla Bastimentos), which contains most of Isla Bastimentos and some smaller nearby islands and extends into the large nature preserve at the Red Frog Beach Island Resort, and La Amistad International Park (Parque Internacional La Amistad), which spans the Costa Rica–Panama border. Bocas del Toro contains most of the Panamanian section of the park, which covers 400,000 hectares (4,000 km^{2}; 1,544 sq mi). The Costa Rican section of the park covers 584,592 hectares (5,846 km^{2}; 2,257 sq mi). La Amistad International Park is a designated UNESCO World Heritage Site.

== Gallery ==
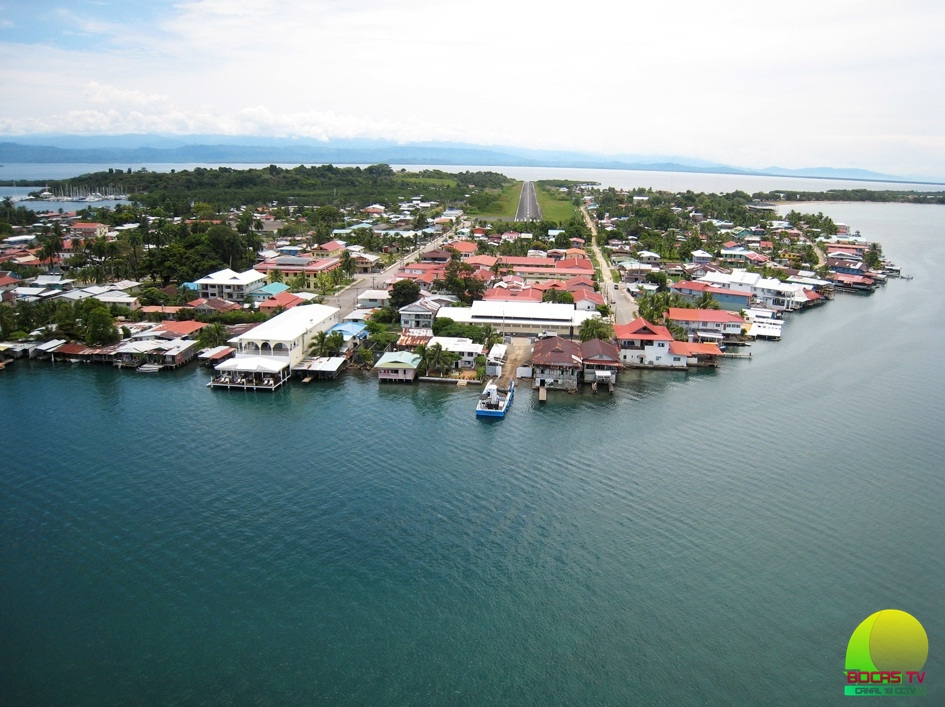
Bocas del Toro

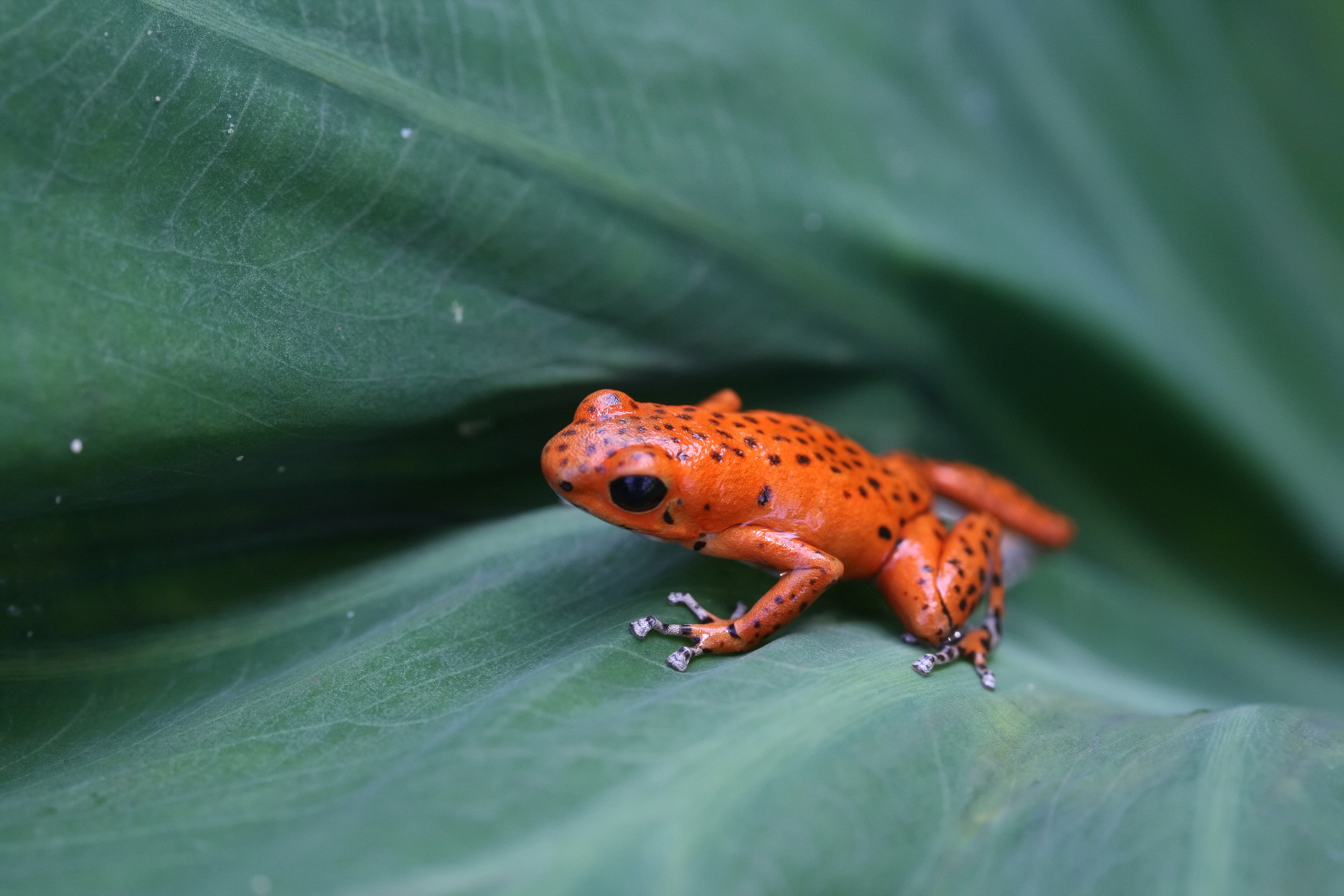
Red poison dart frog, Bastimentos

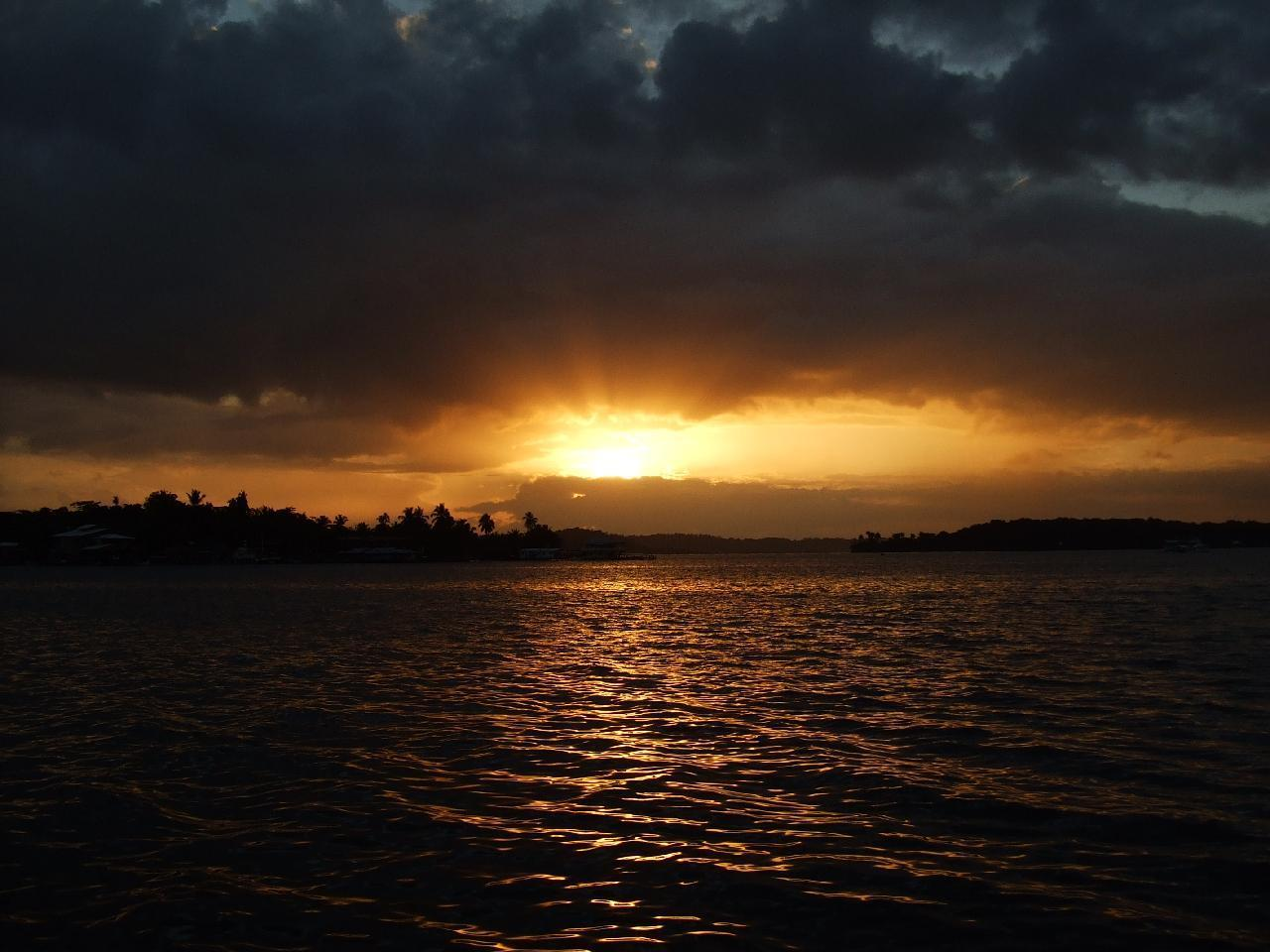
Sunset in Bocas del Toro
