= Guabito =

- Corregimiento and town
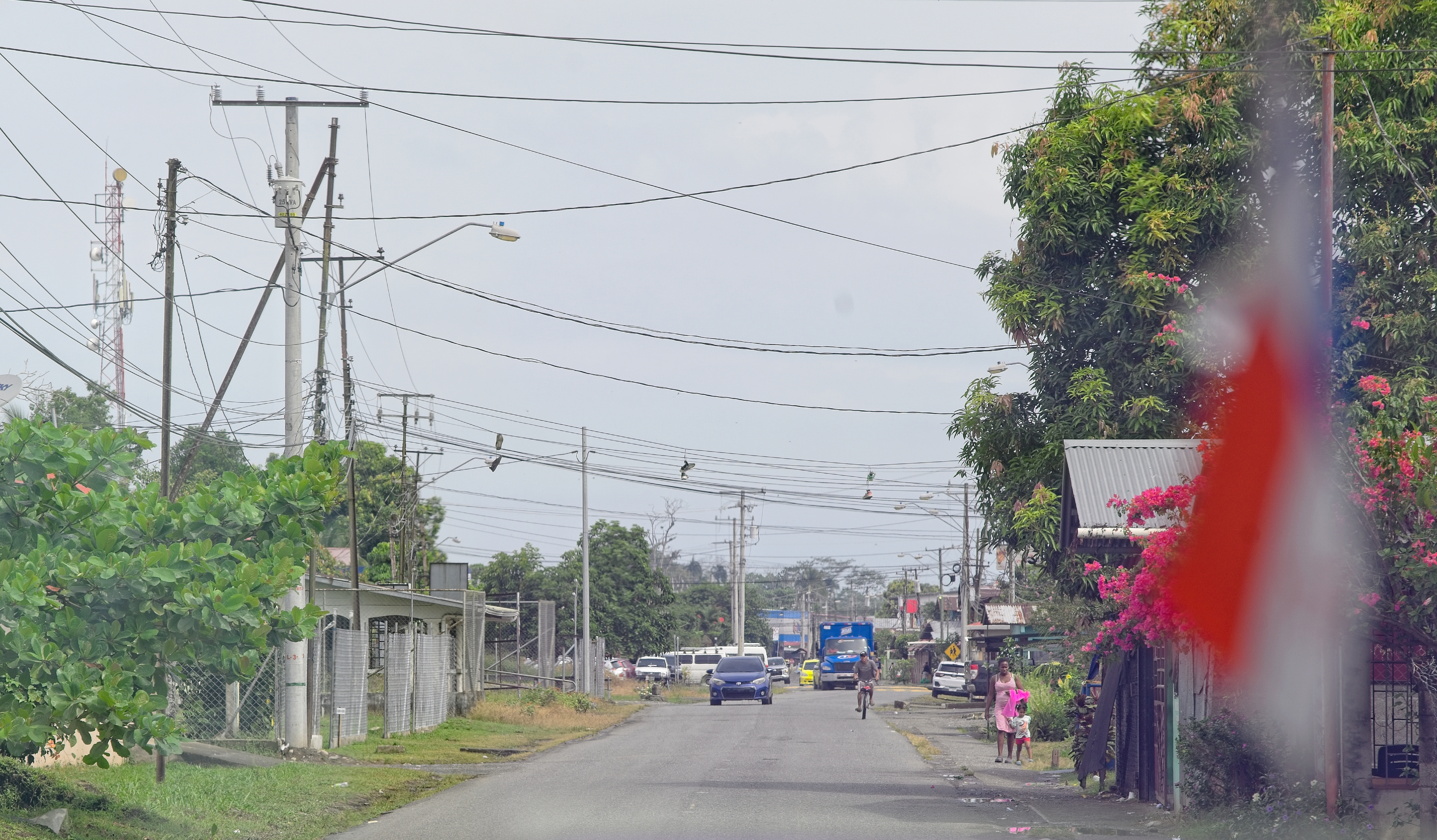
- Interactive map of Guabito
- Location within Panama
- Coordinates: 9°29′41″N 82°36′42″W
- Country: Panama
- Province: Bocas del Toro
- District: Changuinola District

Area
  - Land: 168.8 km^{2} (65.2 sq mi)

Population (2010)
  - Total: 8,387
  - Density: 49.7/km^{2} (129/sq mi)
- Population density calculated based on land area.
- Time zone: UTC-5 (Eastern Standard Time)
- Climate: Tropical rainforest climate(af)

Guabito is a corregimiento and town in the Changuinola District of the Bocas del Toro Province of Panama. It is a small town located directly across the Rio Sixaola from Sixaola, Costa Rica. An elevated former railroad grade and bridge connects Guabito to Sixaola. This border crossing is popular with tourists going between Costa Rica and Bocas del Toro, though few tourists stop in Guabito longer than necessary to clear Panamanian customs.

Guabito has a land area of 168.8 square kilometres (65.2 sq mi) and had a population of 8,387 as of 2010, giving it a population density of 49.7 inhabitants per square kilometre (129/sq mi). Its population as of 1990 was 11,125; its population as of 2000 was 14,366.
