= Changuinola District =

- District
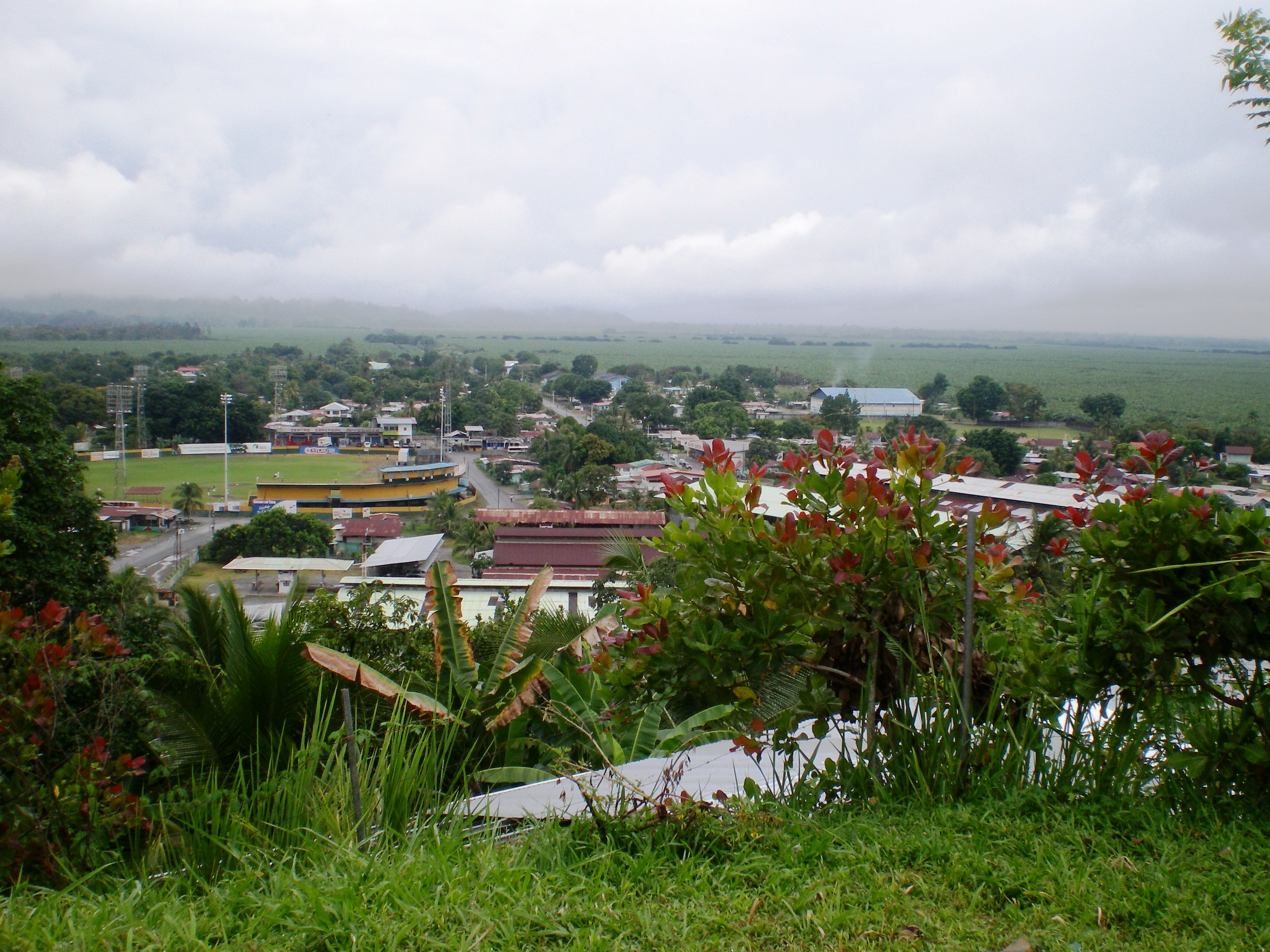
- El Empalme

- Location of the district capital in Panama
- Coordinates: 09°25′48″N 82°31′12″W
- Country: Panama
- Province: Bocas del Toro Province
- Capital: Changuinola

Area
  - Total: 2,222.5 km^{2} (858.1 sq mi)

Population (2023)
  - Total: 101,091
- Time zone: UTC-5 (ETZ)

Changuinola District is a district (distrito) in the Bocas del Toro Province of Panama. It covers an area of 2,222.5 km^{2} (858.1 sq mi) and has a population of 101,091 as per the 2023 census. The district was established in 1970. In 2015, Almirante District was created from its territory.

== History ==
The name "Changuinola" originated from the "Changuinos" people who inhabited the western part of the district. In 1610, king Philip II of Spain sent Agustín de Cevallos to convert the indigenous people to Christianity, resulted in a conflict with the locals. In the early 20th century, banana plantations were established in the region, which became a major contributor to the economy. The Changuinola District was established on 17 April 1970 by Decree No. 81. On 8 June 2015, Almirante District was split from Changuinola District by Law 39.

== Geography ==
Changuinola District is one of the 82 districts of Panama. It is part of the Bocas del Toro Province. It is spread over an area of 2,222.5 km^{2} (858.1 sq mi).

=== Climate ===
Changuinola has a coastal location with a tropical climate. The area does not have a predictable dry season. The driest times are late August to mid-October, February, and March. Changuinola is humid. Thundershowers and heavy rain are common. Normal temperatures are consistent all year (Hi: 80°-84 °F, low: 71°-75 °F). Due to its low latitude, sunrise is around 6 AM, and sunset is around 6 PM local time. These times vary slightly during the year. Weather data is collected at Captain Manuel Nino International Airport in Changuinola.

Climate data for Changuinola, Panama
Month	Jan	Feb	Mar	Apr	May	Jun	Jul	Aug	Sep	Oct	Nov	Dec	Year
Mean daily maximum °F (°C)	80 (27)	80 (27)	82 (28)	83 (28)	83 (28)	83 (28)	82 (28)	82 (28)	84 (29)	83 (28)	81 (27)	80 (27)	82 (28)
Mean daily minimum °F (°C)	71 (22)	71 (22)	72 (22)	73 (23)	75 (24)	75 (24)	74 (23)	74 (23)	75 (24)	75 (24)	73 (23)	72 (22)	73 (23)
Average precipitation inches (mm)	12.56 (319)	7.90 (201)	7.61 (193)	11.30 (287)	11.08 (281)	10.87 (276)	16.06 (408)	11.37 (289)	6.42 (163)	7.80 (198)	14.45 (367)	15.81 (402)	133.23 (3,384)
Source: Weather Underground

== Administration and politics ==
The city of Changuinola is the capital of the district. The district is divided into the following corregimientos: Changuinola, Barriada 4 de Abril, Finca 6, Finca 30, Finca 60, Guabito, El Empalme, Las Tablas, Las Delicias, Cochigró, La Gloria, El Silencio, Barranco Adentro, Finca 4, Finca 12, Finca 51, Finca 66, and La Mesa.

The National Assembly of Panama has 71 members, who are elected directly from single and multi-member constituencies. The district forms part of the Bocas del Toro Province, which elects three members to the National Assembly. The district forms part of the Bocas del Toro Province, which has two electoral circuits, and elects three members to the National Assembly.

== Demographics ==
As per the 2023 census, Changuinola District had a population of 101,091 inhabitants. The population increased from 98,310 in the 2010 census. The population consisted of 50,980 males and 50,111 females. About 38,265 (37.8%) of the inhabitants were below the age of 14 years and 4,808 inhabitants (4.8%) were above the age of 65 years. The majority (53.6%) of the population was classified as rural while the remaining 46.4% was classified as urban. Ngäbe people (66.3%) formed the major ethnic group in the district, while non-indigenous people formed 26.3% of the population.
