= Panama =

Country in Central America

Republic of Panama República de Panamá (Spanish)
- Flag Coat of arms
- Motto: Pro Mundi Beneficio (Latin) "For the Benefit of the World"
- Anthem: Himno Istmeño (Spanish) "Hymn of the Isthmus"
- Capital and largest city: Panama City; 8°58′N 79°32′W
- Official languages: Spanish
- Recognized regional languages: Guaymí; Buglere; Emberá; Wounaan; Guna; Teribe; Bribri
- Ethnic groups (2020): 65.0% Mestizo (mixed White and Indigenous); 12.3% Indigenous; 9.2% Black; 6.8% Mulatto (mixed White and Black); 6.7% White
- Religion (2015): 91.5% Christianity; 63.2% Catholicism; 25.0% Protestantism; 3.3% other Christian; 7.6% no religion; 0.9% other
- Demonym: Panamanian
- Government: Unitary presidential republic
  - President: José Raúl Mulino
  - Vice President: Vacant
- Legislature: National Assembly

Independence
  - from Spanish Empire: November 28, 1821
  - union with Gran Colombia: December 1821
  - from Republic of Colombia: November 3, 1903
  - Current constitution: October 11, 1972

Area
  - Total: 75,417 km^{2} (29,119 sq mi) (116th)
  - Water (%): 2.9

Population
  - 2025 estimate: ▲4,571,189 (127th)
  - 2023 census: 4,064,780
  - Density: 56/km^{2} (145.0/sq mi) (122nd)
- GDP (PPP): 2026 estimate
  - Total: ▲$217.782 billion (80th)
  - Per capita: ▲$47,129 (50th)
- GDP (nominal): 2026 estimate
  - Total: ▲$96.471 billion (77th)
  - Per capita: ▲$20,877 (55th)
- Gini (2023): ▼48.9 high inequality
- HDI (2023): ▲0.839 very high (59th)
- Currency: Balboa (PAB); United States dollar (USD)
- Time zone: UTC−5 (EST)
- Date format: mm/dd/yyyy dd/mm/yyyy
- Calling code: +507
- ISO 3166 code: PA
- Internet TLD: .pa

Panama, (Note: /ˈpænəmɑː/ PAN-ə-mah, /pænəˈmɑː/ pan-ə-MAH; Spanish: Panamá IPA: [panaˈma]) officially the Republic of Panama, (Note: Spanish: República de Panamá) is a country located at the southern end of Central America in North America, bordering South America. It is bordered by Costa Rica to the west, Colombia to the southeast, the Caribbean Sea to the north, and the Pacific Ocean to the south. Its capital and largest city is Panama City, whose metropolitan area is home to nearly half of the country's over 4 million inhabitants. Located on a narrow isthmus between two oceans, Panama is the site of the Panama Canal, a major route for maritime trade.

Before the arrival of Spanish colonists in the 16th century, Panama was inhabited by a number of different Indigenous peoples. It broke away from Spain in 1821 and joined the Republic of Gran Colombia, a union of Nueva Granada, Ecuador, and Venezuela. After Gran Colombia dissolved in 1831, Panama and Nueva Granada eventually became the Republic of Colombia. With the backing of the United States, Panama seceded from Colombia in 1903, allowing the construction of the Panama Canal to be completed by the United States Army Corps of Engineers between 1904 and 1914. The 1977 Torrijos–Carter Treaties agreed to transfer the canal from the United States to Panama on December 31, 1999. The surrounding territory was returned first, in 1979.

Revenue from canal tolls has continued to represent a significant portion of Panama's GDP, especially after the Panama Canal expansion project (finished in 2016) doubled its capacity. Commerce, banking, and tourism are major sectors. Panama is regarded as having a high-income economy. In 2019, Panama ranked 57th in the world in terms of the Human Development Index. In 2018, Panama was ranked the seventh-most competitive economy in Latin America, according to the World Economic Forum's Global Competitiveness Index. Panama was ranked 82nd in the Global Innovation Index in 2025. Covering around 40 percent of its land area, Panama's jungles are home to an abundance of tropical plants and animals – some of them found nowhere else on Earth.

Panama is a founding member of the United Nations and other international organizations such as the Organization of American States, Latin America Integration Association, Group of 77, World Health Organization, and Non-Aligned Movement.

== Etymology ==
The exact origin of the name "Panama" remains uncertain, with several theories proposed.

- Sterculia apetala (Panama tree): One theory suggests that the name derives from the Sterculia apetala tree, commonly known as the Panama tree, which is native to the region and holds national significance. This tree was declared the national tree of Panama by Cabinet Decree No. 371 on November 26, 1969.
- Guna language "pannaba": A further hypothesis is that "Panama" is a Castilianization of the Guna word "pannaba," meaning "very far away."

A widely recounted legend holds that "Panamá" was the name of a fishing village encountered by Spanish colonists, purportedly meaning "abundance of fish." While the precise location of this village is unknown, the legend is often associated with accounts from Spanish explorer Antonio Tello de Guzmán, who in 1515 described landing at an unnamed indigenous fishing village along the Pacific coast. Subsequently, in 1517, Spanish lieutenant Gaspar de Espinosa established a trading post at the site, and in 1519, Pedro Arias Dávila founded Panama City there, replacing the earlier settlement of Santa María la Antigua del Darién.

== History ==
=== Pre-Columbian period ===
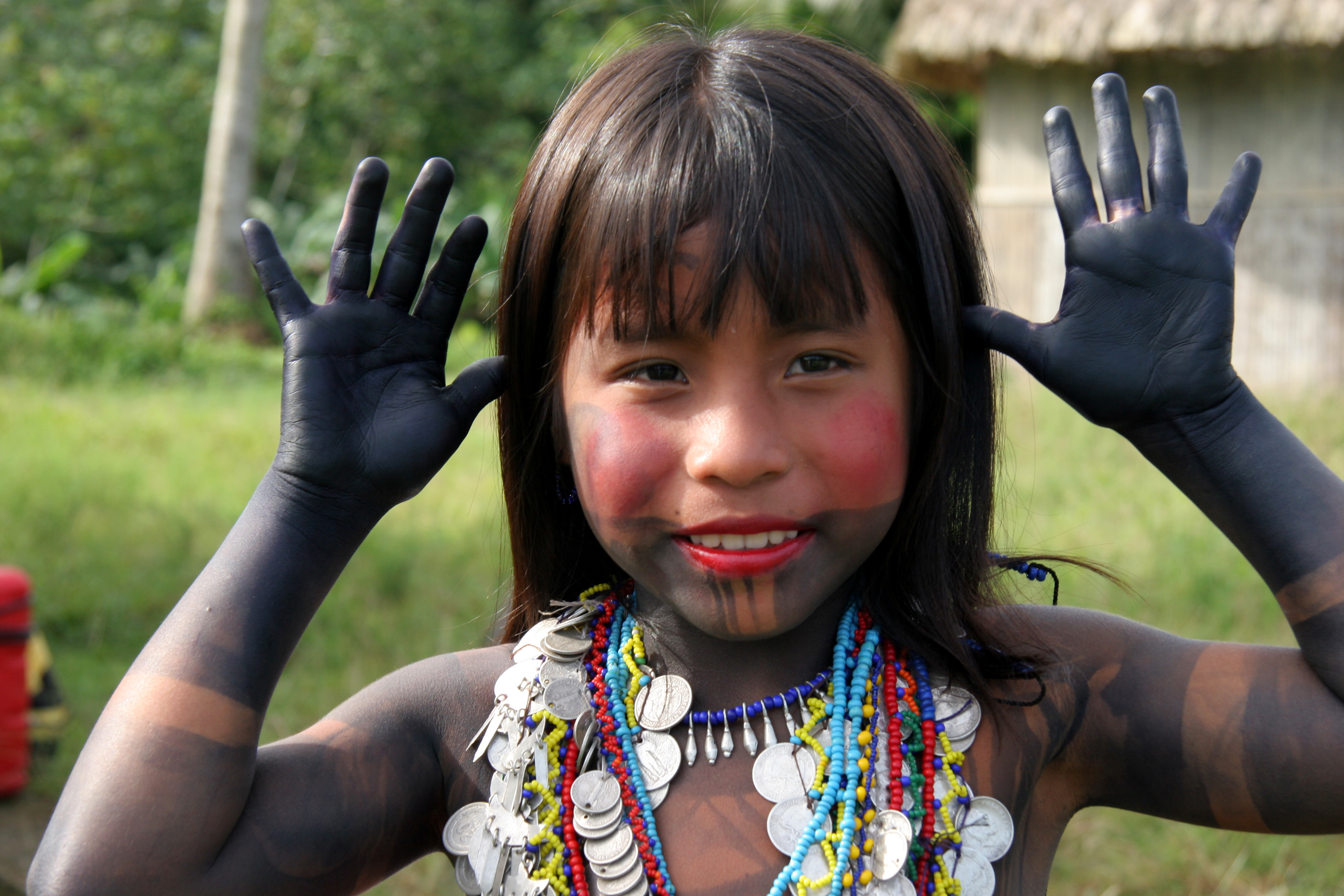
Embera girl dressed for a dance

The Isthmus of Panama was formed about three million years ago when the land bridge between North and South America finally became complete, and plants and animals gradually crossed it in both directions. The existence of the isthmus affected the dispersal of people, agriculture and technology throughout the Americas from the appearance of the first hunters and collectors to the era of villages and cities.

The earliest discovered artifacts of indigenous peoples in Panama include Paleo-Indian projectile points. Later central Panama was home to some of the first pottery-making in the Americas, for example the cultures at Monagrillo, which date back to 2500–1700 BC. These evolved into significant populations best known through their spectacular burials (dating to c. 500–900 AD) at the Monagrillo archaeological site, and their Gran Coclé style polychrome pottery. The monumental monolithic sculptures at the Barriles (Chiriqui) site are also important traces of these ancient isthmian cultures.

Before Europeans arrived, Panama was widely settled by Chibchan and Chocoan-speaking peoples. The largest group were the Cueva, who spoke a Chocoan language. The size of the Indigenous population of the isthmus at the time of European colonization is uncertain. Estimates range as high as two million people, but more recent studies place that number closer to 200,000. Archaeological finds and testimonials by early European explorers describe diverse native isthmian groups exhibiting cultural variety and suggesting people developed by regular regional routes of commerce. Austronesians had a trade network to Panama as there is evidence of coconuts reaching the Pacific coast of Panama from the Philippines in Precolumbian times.

When Panama was colonized, the Indigenous peoples fled into the forest and nearby islands. Scholars believe that infectious disease was the primary cause of their population decline. They had no acquired immunity to diseases such as smallpox, which had been chronic in Eurasian populations for centuries.

=== Conquest to 1799 ===
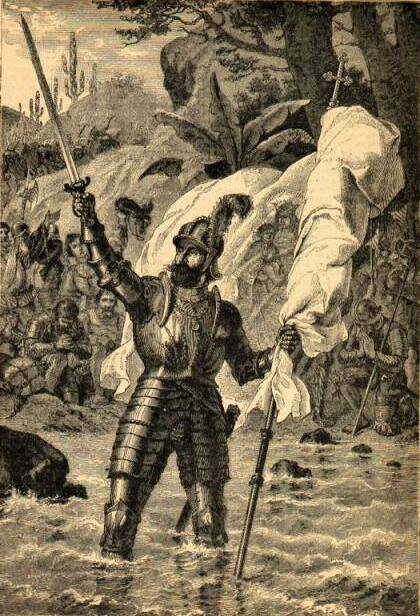
Vasco Núñez de Balboa, a recognized and popular figure of Panamanian history

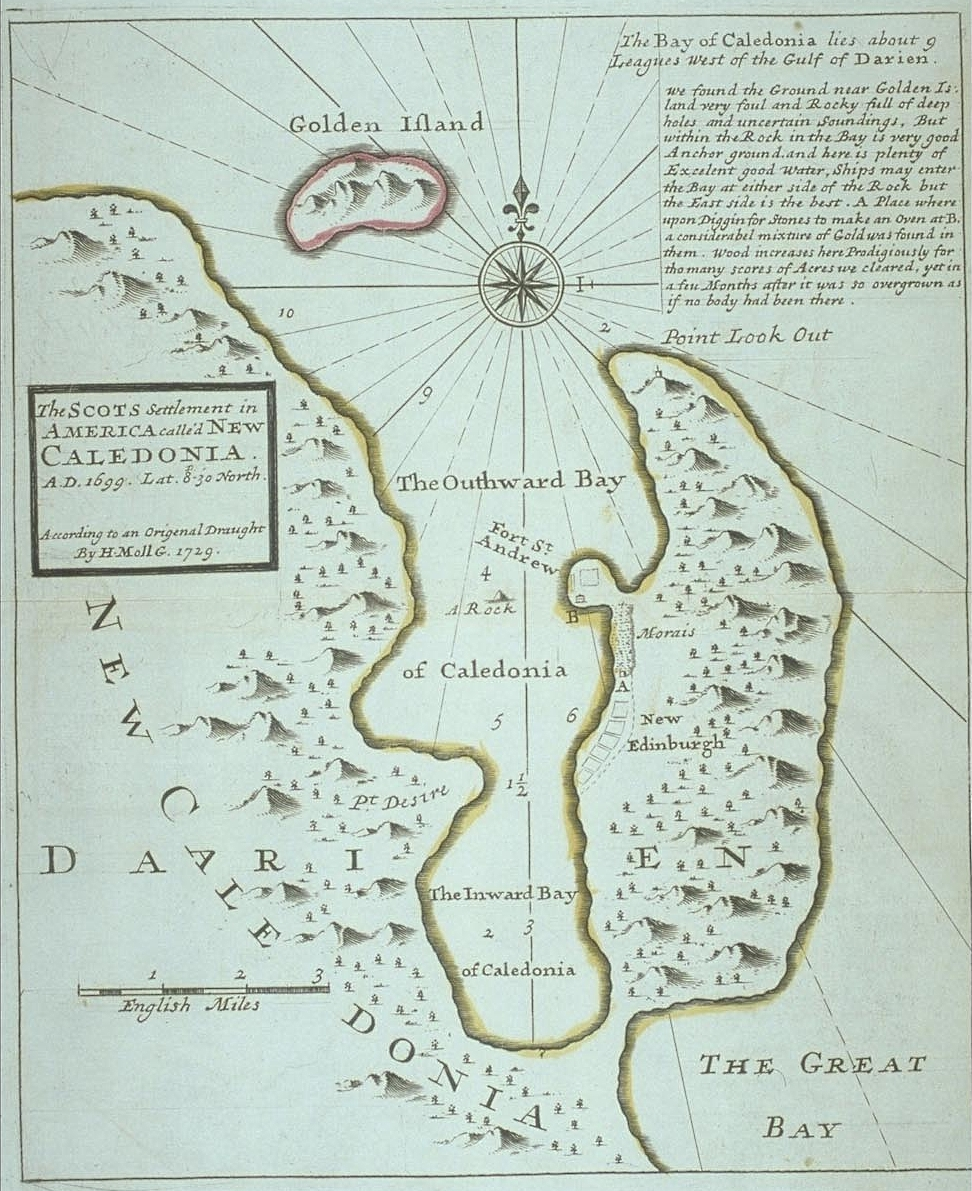
"New Caledonia", the ill-fated Scottish Darien scheme colony in the Bay of Caledonia, west of the Gulf of Darién

Rodrigo de Bastidas sailed westward from Venezuela in 1501 in search of gold, and became the first European to explore the isthmus of Panama. A year later, Christopher Columbus visited the isthmus, and established a short-lived settlement in the province of Darien. Vasco Núñez de Balboa's tortuous trek from the Atlantic to the Pacific in 1513 demonstrated that the isthmus was indeed the path between the seas, and Panama quickly became the crossroads and marketplace of Spain's empire in the New World. King Ferdinand II assigned Pedro Arias Dávila as Royal Governor. He arrived in June 1514 with 19 vessels and 1,500 men. In 1519, Dávila founded Panama City. Gold and silver were brought by ship from South America, hauled across the isthmus, and loaded aboard ships for Spain. The route became known as the Camino Real, or Royal Road, although it was more commonly known as Camino de Cruces (Road of Crosses) because of the number of gravesites along the way. By 1520 the Genoese controlled the port of Panama. The Genoese obtained a concession from the Spanish to exploit the port of Panama mainly for the slave trade, until the destruction of the primeval city in 1671. In the meantime in 1635 Don Sebastián Hurtado de Corcuera, the then governor of Panama, had recruited Genoese, Peruvians, and Panamanians, as soldiers to wage war against Muslims in the Philippines and to found the city of Zamboanga.

Panama was under Spanish rule for almost 300 years (1538–1821), and became part of the Viceroyalty of Peru, along with all other Spanish possessions in South America. From the outset, Panamanian identity was based on a sense of "geographic destiny", and Panamanian fortunes fluctuated with the geopolitical importance of the isthmus. The colonial experience spawned Panamanian nationalism and a racially complex and highly stratified society, the source of internal conflicts that ran counter to the unifying force of nationalism.

Spanish authorities had little control over much of the territory of Panama. Large sections managed to resist conquest and missionization until late in the colonial era. Because of this, indigenous people of the area were often referred to as "indios de guerra" (war Indians). However, Panama was important to Spain strategically because it was the easiest way to ship silver mined in Peru to Europe. Silver cargoes were landed on the west coast of Panama and then taken overland to Portobello or Nombre de Dios on the Caribbean side of the isthmus for further shipment. Aside from the European route, there was also an Asian-American route, which led to traders and adventurers carrying silver from Peru going over land through Panama to reach Acapulco, Mexico before sailing to Manila, Philippines using the famed Manila galleons. In 1579, the royal monopoly that Acapulco, Mexico had on trading with Manila, Philippines was relaxed and Panama was assigned as another port that was able to trade directly with Asia.

Because of incomplete Spanish control, the Panama route was vulnerable to attack from pirates (mostly Dutch and English), and from "new world" Africans called cimarrons who had freed themselves from enslavement and lived in communes or palenques around the Camino Real in Panama's Interior, and on some of the islands off Panama's Pacific coast. One such famous community amounted to a small kingdom under Bayano, which emerged in the 1552 to 1558 period. Sir Francis Drake's famous raids on Panama in 1572–73 and John Oxenham's crossing to the Pacific Ocean were aided by Panama cimarrons, and Spanish authorities were only able to bring them under control by making an alliance with them that guaranteed their freedom in exchange for military support in 1582.

The following elements helped define a distinctive sense of autonomy and of regional or national identity within Panama well before the rest of the colonies: the prosperity enjoyed during the first two centuries (1540–1740) while contributing to colonial growth; the placing of extensive regional judicial authority (Real Audiencia) as part of its jurisdiction; and the pivotal role it played at the height of the Spanish Empire – the first modern global empire.

Panama was the site of the ill-fated Darien scheme, which set up a Scottish colony in the region in 1698. This failed for a number of reasons, and the ensuing debt contributed to the union of England and Scotland in 1707.

In 1671, the privateer Henry Morgan, licensed by the English government, sacked and burned the city of Panama – the second most important city in the Spanish New World at the time. In 1717 the viceroyalty of New Granada (northern South America) was created in response to other Europeans trying to take Spanish territory in the Caribbean region. The Isthmus of Panama was placed under its jurisdiction. However, the remoteness of New Granada's capital, Santa Fe de Bogotá (the modern capital of Colombia) proved a greater obstacle than the Spanish crown anticipated as the authority of New Granada was contested by the seniority, closer proximity, and previous ties to the viceroyalty of Peru and even by Panama's own initiative. This uneasy relationship between Panama and Bogotá would persist for centuries.

In 1744, Bishop Francisco Javier de Luna Victoria DeCastro established the College of San Ignacio de Loyola and on June 3, 1749, founded La Real y Pontificia Universidad de San Javier. By this time, however, Panama's importance and influence had become insignificant as Spain's power dwindled in Europe and advances in navigation technique increasingly permitted ships to round Cape Horn in order to reach the Pacific. While the Panama route was short it was also labor-intensive and expensive because of the loading and unloading and laden-down trek required to get from the one coast to the other.

=== 1800s ===
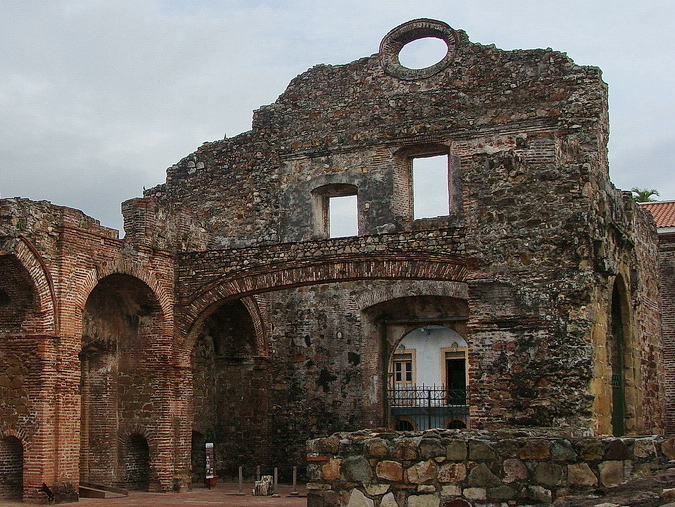
Santo Domingo Church

As the Spanish American wars of independence were heating up all across Latin America, Panama City was preparing for independence; however, their plans were accelerated by the unilateral Grito de La Villa de Los Santos (Cry From the Town of Saints), issued on November 10, 1821, by the residents of Azuero without backing from Panama City to declare their separation from the Spanish Empire. In both Veraguas and the capital this act was met with disdain, although on differing levels. To Veraguas, it was the ultimate act of treason, while to the capital, it was seen as inefficient and irregular, and furthermore forced them to accelerate their plans.

Nevertheless, the Grito was a sign, on the part of the residents of Azuero, of their antagonism toward the independence movement in the capital. Those in the capital region in turn regarded the Azueran movement with contempt, since the separatists in Panama City believed that their counterparts in Azuero were fighting not only for independence from Spain, but also for their right to self-rule apart from Panama City once the Spaniards were gone.

It was seen as a risky move on the part of Azuero, which lived in fear of Colonel José Pedro Antonio de Fábrega y de las Cuevas (1774–1841). The colonel was a staunch loyalist and had all of the isthmus' military supplies in his hands. They feared quick retaliation and swift retribution against the separatists.

What they had counted on, however, was the influence of the separatists in the capital. Ever since October 1821, when the former Governor General, Juan de la Cruz Murgeón, left the isthmus on a campaign in Quito and left a colonel in charge, the separatists had been slowly converting Fábrega to the separatist side. So, by November 10, Fábrega was now a supporter of the independence movement. Soon after the separatist declaration of Los Santos, Fábrega convened every organization in the capital with separatist interests and formally declared the city's support for independence. No military repercussions occurred because of skillful bribing of royalist troops.

=== Independence to 1968 ===
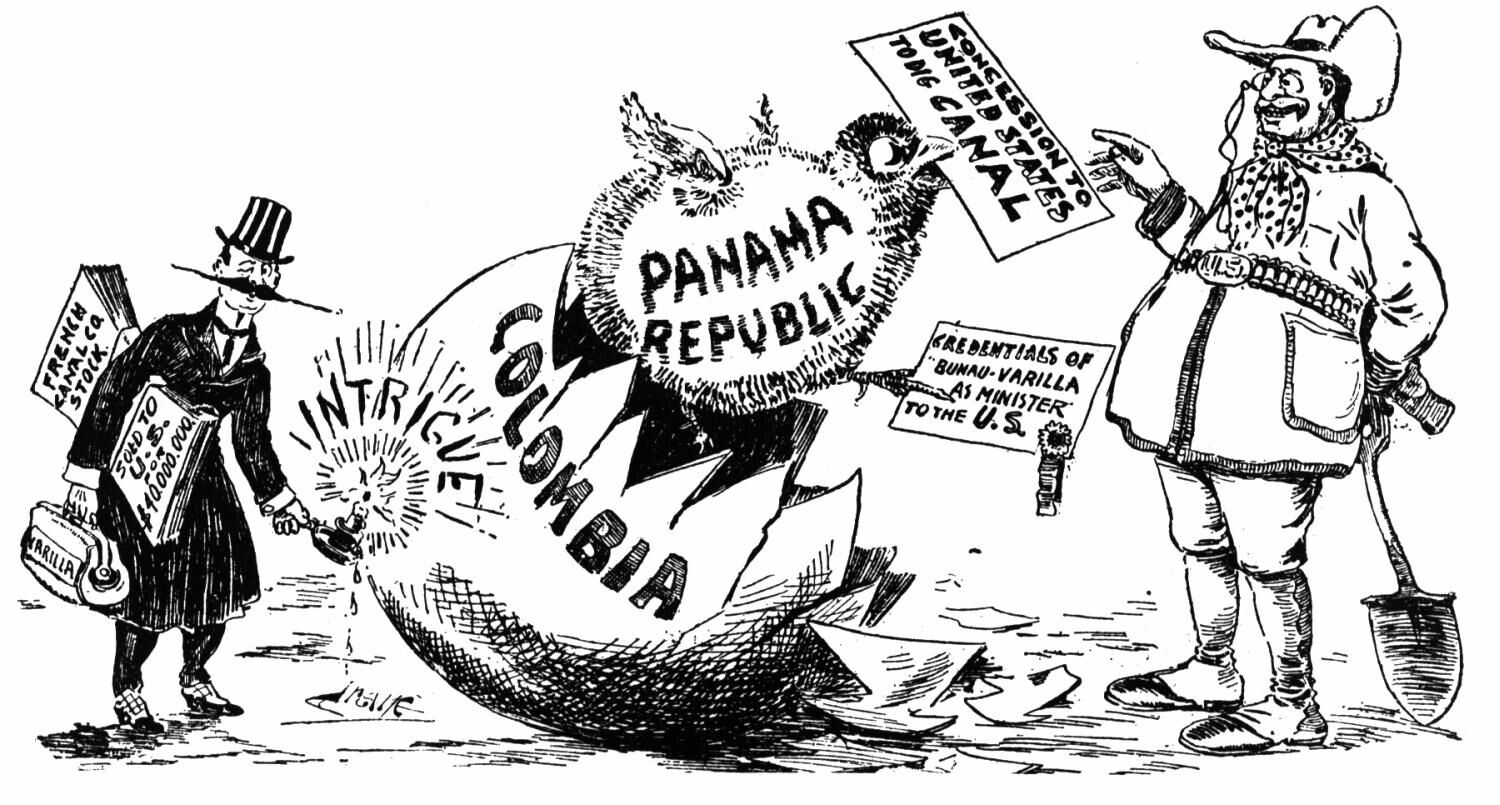
1903 political cartoon. The US government, working with separatists in Panama, engineered a Panamanian declaration of independence from Colombia, then sent US warships and marines to Panama to prevent Colombian intervention.

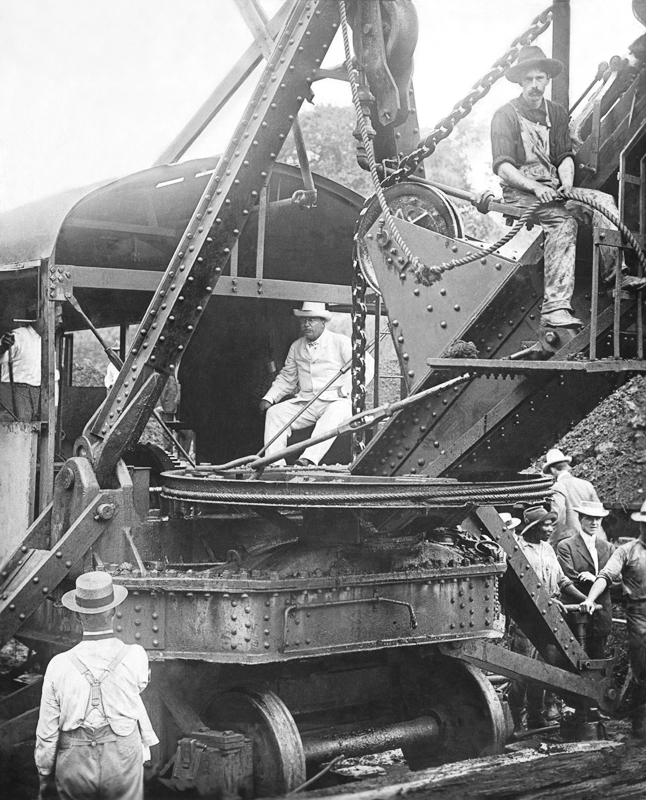
US President Theodore Roosevelt sitting on a steam shovel at the Panama Canal, 1906

In the 80 years following its independence from Spain, Panama was a subdivision of Gran Colombia, after voluntarily joining the country at the end of 1821. It then became part of the Republic of New Granada in 1831 and was divided into several provinces. In 1855, the autonomous State of Panama was created within the Republic out of the New Granada provinces of Panama, Azuero, Chiriquí, and Veraguas. It continued as a state in the Granadine Confederation (1858–1863) and United States of Colombia (1863–1886). The 1886 constitution of the modern Republic of Colombia created a new Panama Department.

The people of the isthmus made over 80 attempts to secede from Colombia. They came close to success in 1831, then again during the Thousand Days' War of 1899–1902, understood among Indigenous Panamanians as a struggle for land rights under the leadership of Victoriano Lorenzo.

The US intent to influence the area, especially the Panama Canal's construction and control, led to the secession of Panama from Colombia in 1903 and its political independence. When the Senate of Colombia rejected the Hay–Herrán Treaty on January 22, 1903, the United States decided to support and encourage the Panamanian secessionist movement.

In November 1903, Panama, tacitly supported by the United States, proclaimed its independence and concluded the Hay–Bunau-Varilla Treaty with the United States without the presence of a single Panamanian. Philippe Bunau-Varilla, a French engineer and lobbyist represented Panama even though Panama's president and a delegation had arrived in New York to negotiate the treaty. Bunau-Varilla was a shareholder in a French company (the Compagnie Nouvelle du Canal de Panama), which had acquired the rights of the original French company which had gone bankrupt in 1889. The treaty was quickly drafted and signed the night before the Panamanian delegation arrived in Washington. The treaty granted rights to the United States "as if it were sovereign" in a zone roughly 16 km (10 mi) wide and 80 km (50 mi) long. In that zone, the US would build a canal, then administer, fortify, and defend it "in perpetuity".

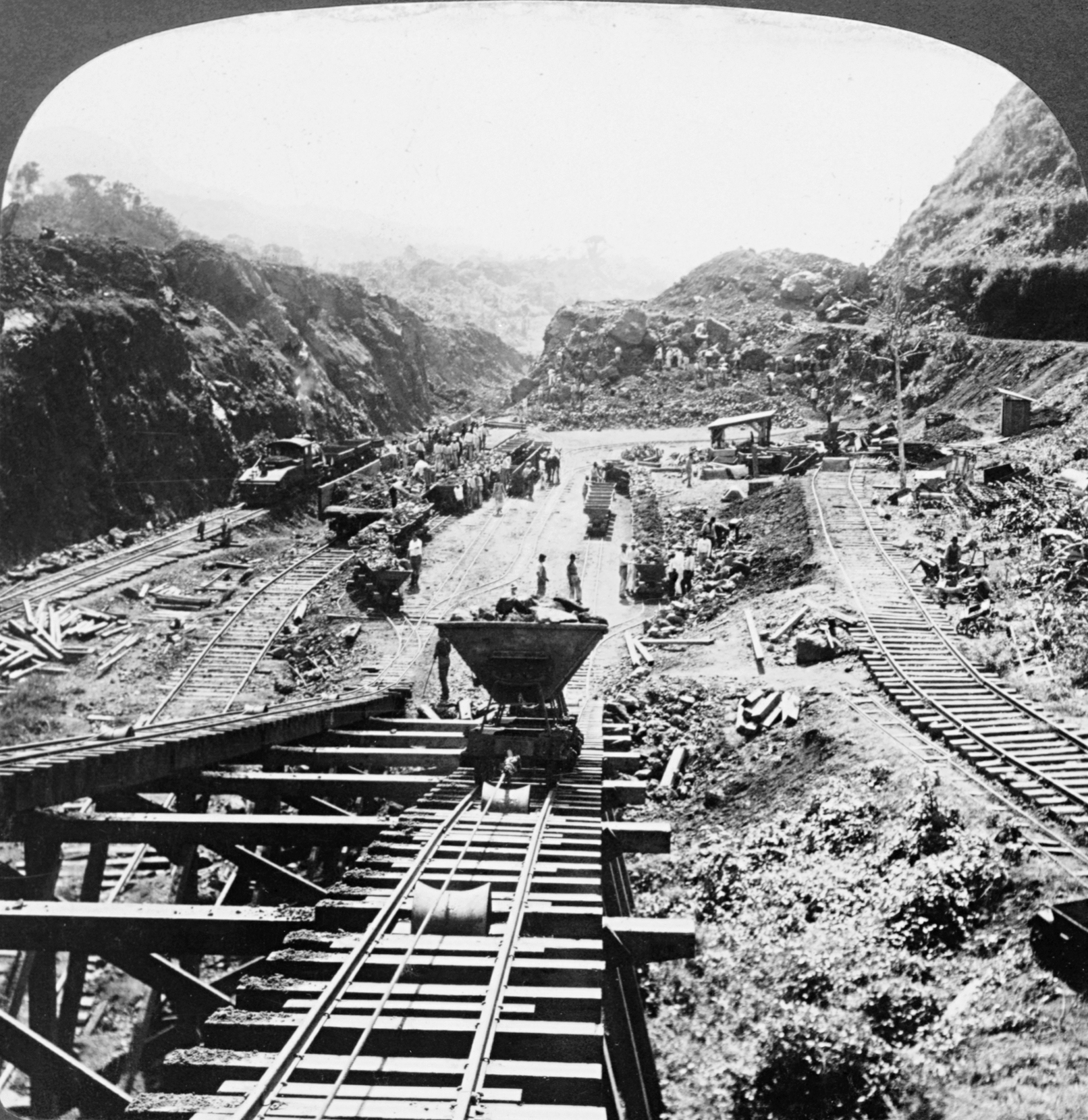
Construction work on the Gaillard Cut of the Panama Canal, 1907

In 1914, the United States completed the existing 83-kilometer-long (52-mile) canal.

Because of the strategic importance of the canal during World War II, the US extensively fortified access to it.

From 1903 to 1968, Panama was a constitutional democracy dominated by a commercially oriented oligarchy. During the 1950s, the Panamanian military began to challenge the oligarchy's political hegemony. The early 1960s saw also the beginning of sustained pressure in Panama for the renegotiation of the Hay–Bunau-Varilla Treaty, including riots that broke out in early 1964, resulting in widespread looting and dozens of deaths, and the evacuation of the American embassy. This is called Martyr's day.

=== Military dictatorship ===
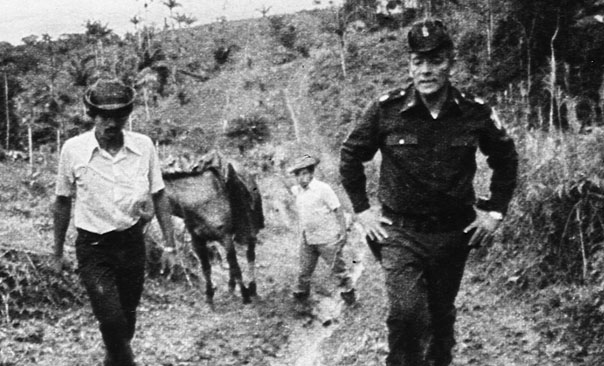
Omar Torrijos (right) with farmers in the Panamanian countryside. The Torrijos government was well known for its policies of land redistribution.

Amid negotiations for the Robles–Johnson treaty, Panama held elections in 1968. The candidates included Dr. Arnulfo Arias Madrid for the Unión Nacional (National Union). Arias Madrid was declared the winner of elections that were marked by violence and accusations of fraud against other candidates under Alianza del Pueblo. On October 1, 1968, Arias Madrid took office as president of Panama, promising to lead a government of "national union" that would end the reigning corruption and pave the way for a new Panama. A week and a half later, on October 11, 1968, the National Guard (Guardia Nacional) ousted Arias and initiated the downward spiral that would culminate with the United States' invasion in 1989. Arias, who had promised to respect the hierarchy of the National Guard, broke the pact and started a large restructuring of the Guard. To preserve the Guard's and his vested interests, Lieutenant Colonel Omar Torrijos Herrera and Major Boris Martínez commanded another military coup against the government.

The military justified itself by declaring that Arias Madrid was trying to install a dictatorship, and promised a return to constitutional rule. In the meantime, the Guard began a series of populist measures that would gain support for the coup. These measures included price freezing on food, medicine and other goods until January 31, 1969, as well as rent freezes and legalization of the permanence of squatting families in boroughs surrounding the historic site of Panama Viejo Parallel to this, the military began a policy of repression against the opposition, who were labeled communists. The military appointed a Provisional Government Junta that was to arrange new elections. However, the National Guard would prove to be very reluctant to abandon power and soon began calling itself El Gobierno Revolucionario (The Revolutionary Government).

Under Omar Torrijos's control, the military transformed the political and economic structure of the country, initiating massive coverage of social security services and expanding public education.

The constitution was changed in 1972. To reform the constitution, the military created a new organization, the Assembly of Corregimiento Representatives, which replaced the National Assembly. The new assembly, also known as the Poder Popular (Power of the People), was composed of 505 members selected by the military with no participation from political parties, which the military had eliminated. The new constitution proclaimed Omar Torrijos as the Maximum Leader of the Panamanian Revolution, and conceded him unlimited power for six years, although, to keep a façade of constitutionality, Demetrio B. Lakas was appointed president for the same period.

In 1981, Torrijos died in a plane crash. Torrijos' death altered the tone of Panama's political evolution. Despite the 1983 constitutional amendments which proscribed a political role for the military, the Panama Defense Force (PDF), as they were then known, continued to dominate Panamanian political life. By this time, General Manuel Antonio Noriega was firmly in control of both the PDF and the civilian government.

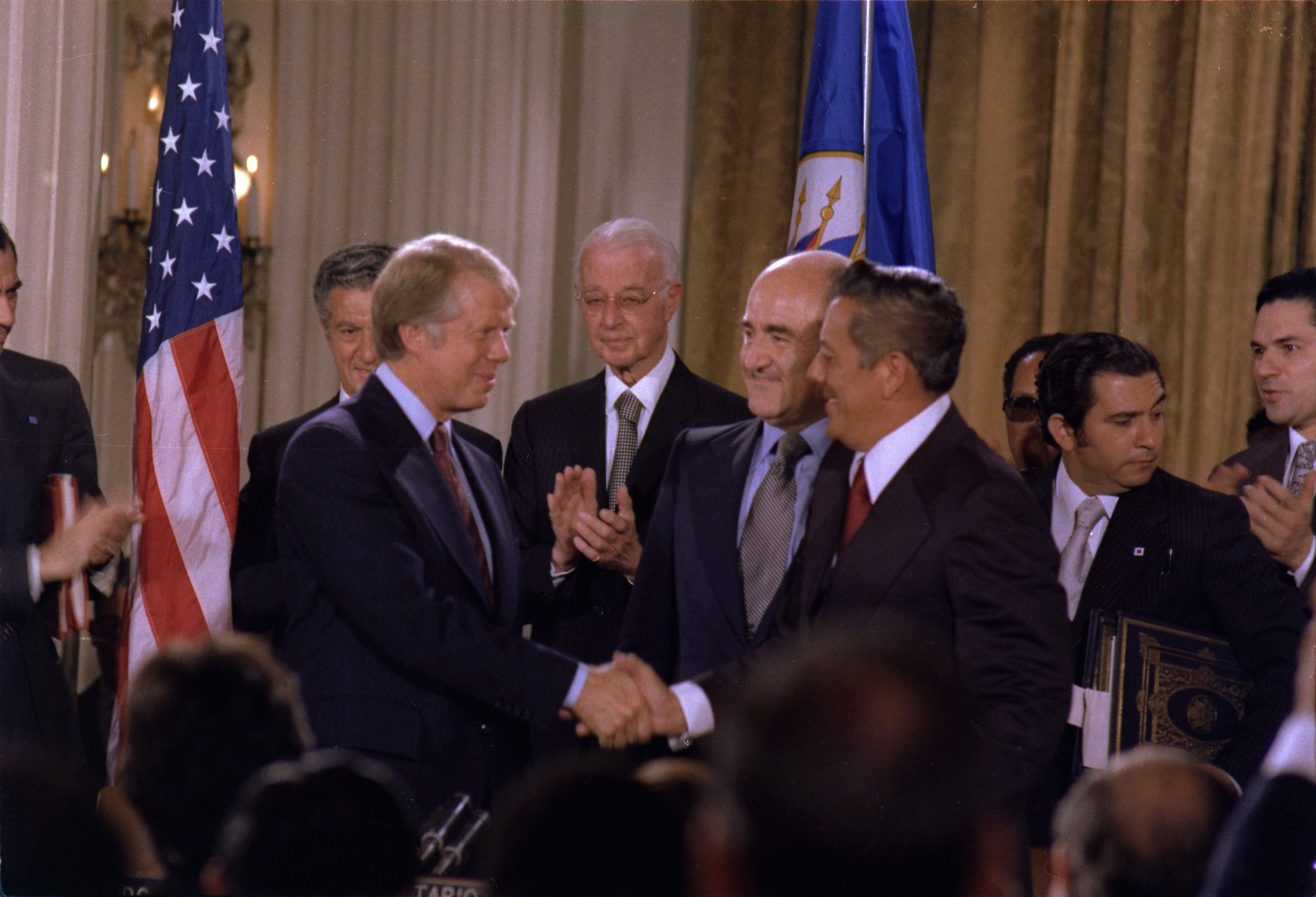
US President Jimmy Carter shakes hands with General Omar Torrijos after signing the Panama Canal Treaties (September 7, 1977).

In the 1984 elections, the candidates included Nicolás Ardito Barletta Vallarino (supported by the military in a union called UNADE),previous leader Arnulfo Arias Madrid (for the opposition union ADO) and ex-General Rubén Darío Paredes, who had been forced to an early retirement by Manuel Noriega, running for the Partido Nacionalista Popular (PAP; "Popular Nationalist Party"). Barletta was declared the winner of elections that had been considered to be fraudulent. Barletta inherited a country in economic ruin and hugely indebted to the International Monetary Fund and the World Bank. Amid the economic crisis and Barletta's efforts to calm the country's creditors, street protests arose, and so did military repression. Meanwhile, Noriega's regime had fostered a well-hidden criminal economy that operated as a parallel source of income for the military and their allies, providing revenues from drugs and money laundering. Toward the end of the military dictatorship, a new wave of Chinese migrants arrived on the isthmus in the hope of migrating to the United States. The smuggling of Chinese became an enormous business, with revenues of up to 200 million dollars for Noriega's regime (see Mon 167).

The military dictatorship assassinated or tortured more than one hundred Panamanians and forced at least a hundred more dissidents into exile. (see Zárate 15). Noriega's regime was supported by the United States and it began playing a double role in Central America. While the Contadora group, an initiative launched by the foreign ministers of various Latin American nations including Panama's, conducted diplomatic efforts to achieve peace in the region, Noriega supplied Nicaraguan Contras and other guerrillas in the region with weapons and ammunition on behalf of the CIA.

On June 6, 1987, the recently retired Colonel Roberto Díaz Herrera, resentful that Noriega had broken the agreed-upon "Torrijos Plan" of succession that would have made him the chief of the military after Noriega, decided to denounce the regime. He revealed details of electoral fraud, accused Noriega of planning Torrijos's death and declared that Torrijos had received 12 million dollars from the Shah of Iran for giving the exiled Iranian leader asylum. He also accused Noriega of the assassination by decapitation of then-opposition leader, Dr. Hugo Spadafora.

On the night of June 9, 1987, the Cruzada Civilista ("Civic Crusade") was created and began organizing actions of civil disobedience. The Crusade called for a general strike. In response, the military suspended constitutional rights and declared a state of emergency in the country. On July 10, the Civic Crusade called for a massive demonstration that was violently repressed by the "Dobermans", the military's special riot control unit. That day, later known as El Viernes Negro ("Black Friday"), left many people injured and killed.

United States President Ronald Reagan began a series of sanctions against the military regime. The United States froze economic and military assistance to Panama in the middle of 1987 in response to the domestic political crisis in Panama and an attack on the US embassy. The sanctions failed to oust Noriega, but severely hurt Panama's economy. Panama's gross domestic product (GDP) declined almost 25 percent between 1987 and 1989.

On February 5, 1988, General Manuel Antonio Noriega was accused of drug trafficking by federal juries in Tampa and Miami. Human Rights Watch wrote in its 1989 report: "Washington turned a blind eye to abuses in Panama for many years until concern over drug trafficking prompted indictments of the general [Noriega] by two grand juries in Florida in February 1988".

In April 1988, US President Ronald Reagan invoked the International Emergency Economic Powers Act, freezing Panamanian government assets in all US organizations. In May 1989 Panamanians voted overwhelmingly for the anti-Noriega candidates. The Noriega regime promptly annulled the election and embarked on a new round of repression.

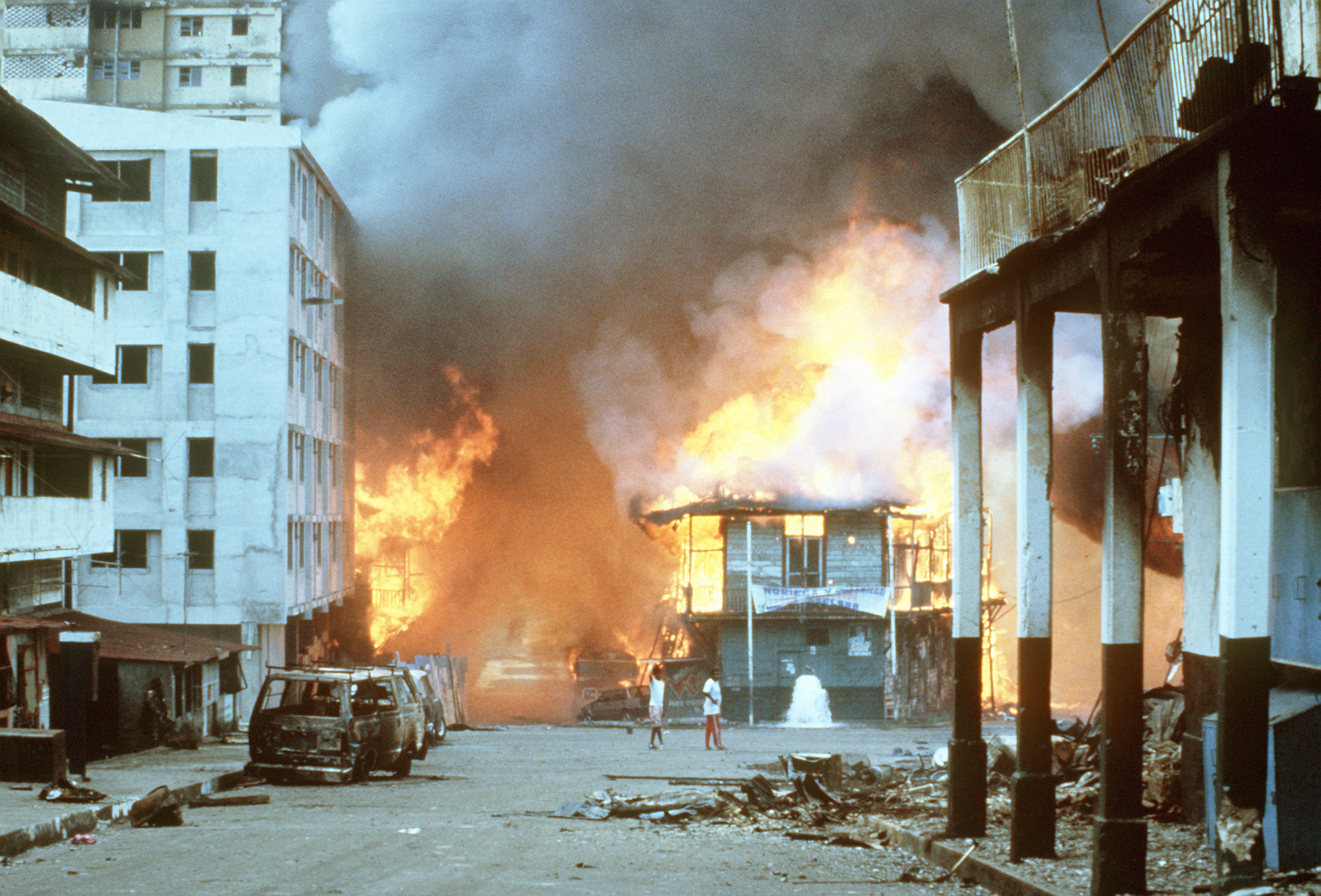
The aftermath of urban warfare during the US invasion of Panama, 1989

==== US invasion (1989) ====
The United States invaded Panama on December 20, 1989, codenamed Operation Just Cause. The U.S. stated the operation was "necessary to safeguard the lives of U.S. citizens in Panama, defend democracy and human rights, combat drug trafficking, and secure the neutrality of the Panama Canal as required by the Torrijos–Carter Treaties". The US reported 23 servicemen killed and 324 wounded, with the number of Panamanian soldiers killed estimated at 450. The estimates for civilians killed in the conflict ranges from 200 to 4,000. The United Nations put the Panamanian civilian death toll at 500, Americas Watch estimated 300, the United States gave a figure of 202 civilians killed and former US attorney general Ramsey Clark estimated 4,000 deaths. It represented the largest United States military operation since the Vietnam War. The number of US civilians (and their dependents), who had worked for the Panama Canal Commission and the US military, and were killed by the Panamanian Defense Forces, has never been fully disclosed.

On December 29, the United Nations General Assembly approved a resolution calling the intervention in Panama a "flagrant violation of international law and of the independence, sovereignty and territorial integrity of the States". A similar resolution was vetoed in the Security Council by the United States, the United Kingdom, and France. Noriega was captured and flown to Miami to be tried. The conflict ended on January 31, 1990.

The urban population, many living below the poverty level, was greatly affected by the 1989 intervention. As pointed out in 1995 by a UN Technical Assistance Mission to Panama, the fighting displaced 20,000 people. The most heavily affected district was the El Chorrillo area of Panama City, where several blocks of apartments were completely destroyed. The economic damage caused by the fighting has been estimated at between 1.5 and 2 billion dollars. Most Panamanians supported the intervention.

=== Post-intervention era ===
Panama's Electoral Tribunal moved quickly to restore civilian constitutional government, reinstated the results of the May 1989 election on December 27, 1989, and confirmed the victory of President Guillermo Endara and Vice Presidents Guillermo Ford and Ricardo Arias Calderón.

During its five-year term, the often-fractious government struggled to meet the public's high expectations. Its new police force was a major improvement over its predecessor but was not fully able to deter crime. Ernesto Pérez Balladares was sworn in as president on September 1, 1994, after an internationally monitored election campaign.

On September 1, 1999, Mireya Moscoso, the widow of former president Arnulfo Arias Madrid, took office after defeating PRD candidate Martín Torrijos, son of Omar Torrijos, in a free and fair election. During her administration, Moscoso attempted to strengthen social programs, especially for child and youth development, protection, and general welfare. Moscoso's administration successfully handled the Panama Canal transfer and was effective in the administration of the Canal.

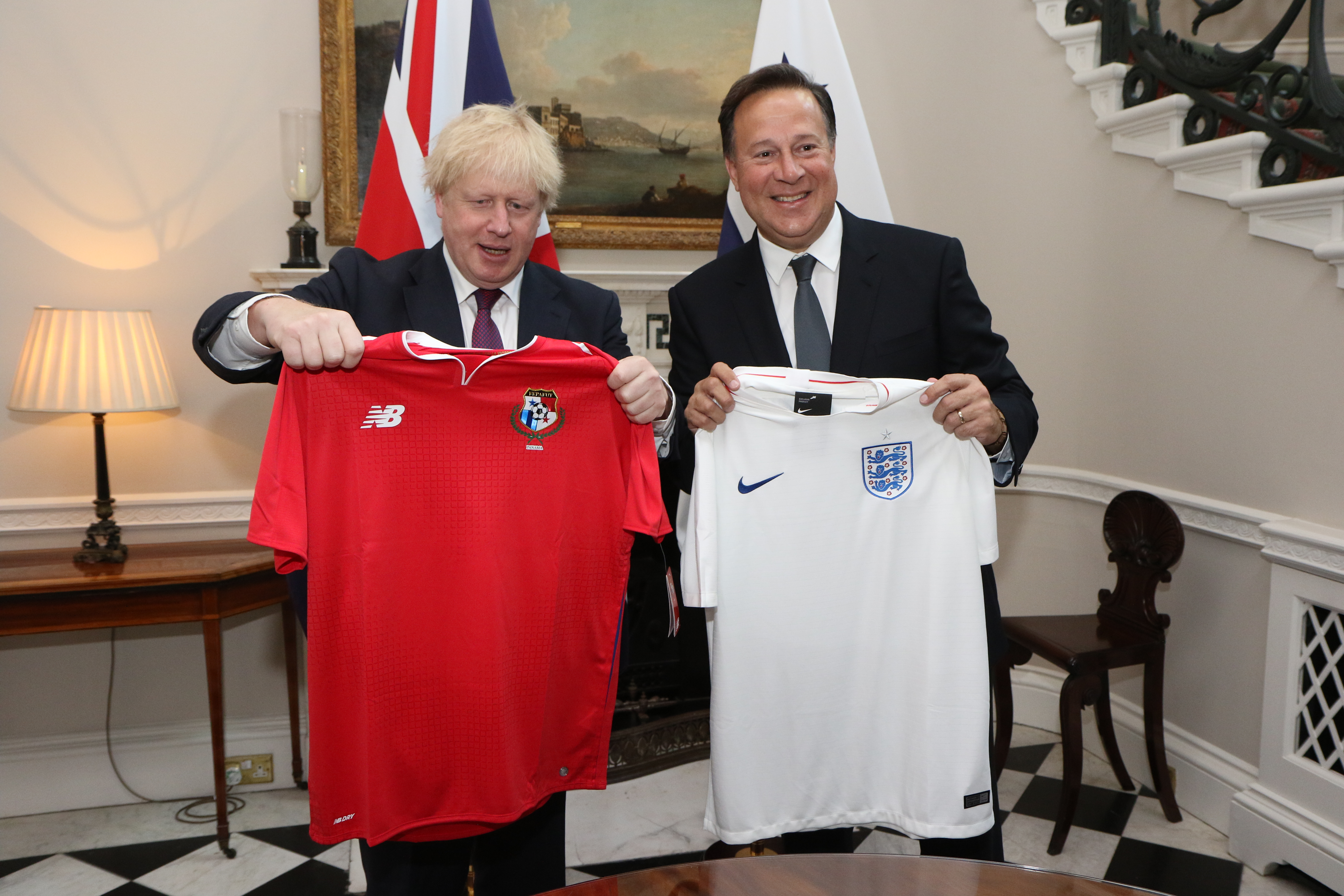
British Foreign Secretary Boris Johnson swapped football shirts with the President of Panama, Juan Carlos Varela, in London, May 14, 2018

The PRD's Martin Torrijos won the presidency and a legislative majority in the National Assembly in 2004. Torrijos ran his campaign on a platform of, among other pledges, a "zero tolerance" for corruption, a problem endemic to the Moscoso and Perez Balladares administrations. After taking office, Torrijos passed a number of laws which made the government more transparent. He formed a National Anti-Corruption Council whose members represented the highest levels of government and civil society, labor organizations, and religious leadership. In addition, many of his closest Cabinet ministers were non-political technocrats known for their support for the Torrijos government's anti-corruption aims. Despite the Torrijos administration's public stance on corruption, many high-profile cases, particularly involving political or business elites, were never acted upon.

Conservative supermarket magnate Ricardo Martinelli was elected to succeed Martin Torrijos with a landslide victory in the May 2009 Panamanian general election. Martinelli's business credentials drew voters worried by slowing growth during the Great Recession. Standing for the four-party opposition Alliance for Change, Martinelli gained 60 percent of the vote, against 37 percent for the candidate of the governing left-wing Democratic Revolutionary Party (PRD).

On May 4, 2014, Vice President Juan Carlos Varela, candidate of the Partido Panamenista (Panamanian Party) won the 2014 presidential election with over 39 percent of the votes, against the party of his former political partner Ricardo Martinelli, Cambio Democrático, and their candidate José Domingo Arias. He was sworn in on July 1, 2014. On July 1, 2019 Laurentino Cortizo took possession of the presidency. Cortizo was the candidate of Democratic Revolution Party (PRD) in the May 2019 presidential election.

During the presidency of Cortizo, numerous events happened in the country, including the COVID-19 pandemic and its economic impact, and the 2022 and 2023 protests.

On July 1, 2024, José Raúl Mulino was sworn in as Panama's new president. Mulino, a close ally of former president Ricardo Martinelli, won the presidential election in May 2024.

== Geography ==
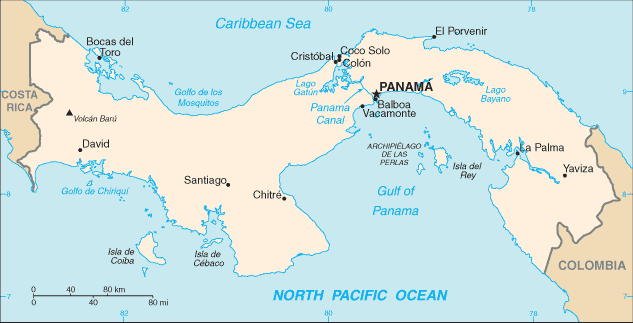
A map of Panama

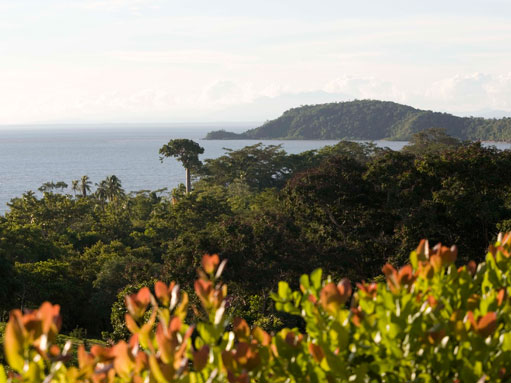
La Palma, Darién

Panama is located in Central America, bordering both the Caribbean Sea and the Pacific Ocean, between Colombia and Costa Rica. It mostly lies between latitudes 7° and 10°N, and longitudes 77° and 83°W (a small area lies west of 83°).

Its location on the Isthmus of Panama is strategic. By 1999, Panama controlled the Panama Canal which connects the Atlantic Ocean and Caribbean Sea to the north with the Pacific Ocean to the south. Panama's total area is 74,177.3 km^{2} (28,640.0 sq mi).

The dominant feature of Panama's geography is the central spine of mountains and hills that form the continental divide. The divide does not form part of the great mountain chains of North America, and only near the Colombian border are there highlands related to the Andean system of South America. The spine that forms the divide is the highly eroded arch of an uplift from the sea bottom, in which peaks were formed by volcanic intrusions.

The mountain range of the divide is called the Cordillera de Talamanca near the Costa Rican border. Farther east it becomes the Serranía de Tabasará, and the portion of it closer to the lower saddle of the isthmus, where the Panama Canal is located (the Sierra de Veraguas). As a whole, the range between Costa Rica and the canal is generally referred to by geographers as the Cordillera Central.

The highest point in the country is the Volcán Barú, which rises to 3,474 meters (11,398 feet) with the mountain and surrounding area protected with national park status. A nearly impenetrable jungle forms the Darién Gap between Panama and Colombia where Colombian guerrillas and drug dealers operate and sometimes take hostages. This, as well as unrest and forest protection movements, creates the only break in the Pan-American Highway, which otherwise forms a complete road from Alaska to Patagonia.

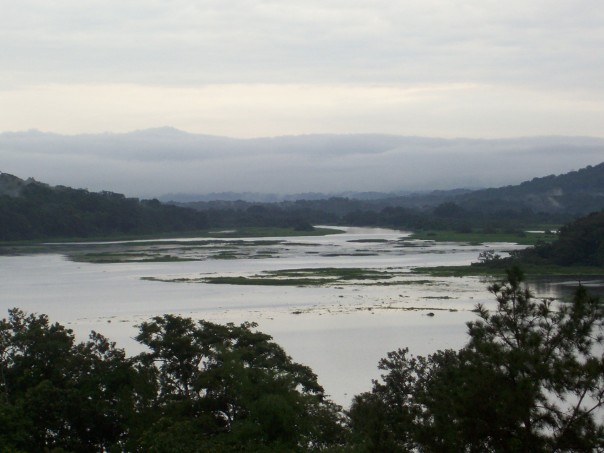
The Chagres River

=== Waterways ===
Nearly 500 rivers lace Panama's rugged landscape. Mostly unnavigable, many originate as swift highland streams, meander in valleys, and form coastal deltas. However, the Río Chagres (Chagres River), located in central Panama, is one of the few wide rivers and a source of hydroelectric power. The central part of the river is dammed by the Gatun Dam and forms Gatun Lake, an artificial lake that constitutes part of the Panama Canal. The lake was created by the construction of the Gatun Dam across the Río Chagres between 1907 and 1913. Once created, Gatun Lake was the largest man-made lake in the world, and the dam was the largest earth dam. The river drains northwest into the Caribbean. The Kampia and Madden Lakes (also filled from the Río Chagres) provide hydroelectricity for the area of the former Canal Zone.

The Río Chepo, another source of hydroelectric power, is one of the more than 300 rivers emptying into the Pacific. These Pacific-oriented rivers are longer and slower-running than those on the Caribbean side. Their basins are also more extensive. One of the longest is the Río Tuira, which flows into the Golfo de San Miguel and is the nation's only river that is navigable by larger vessels.

=== Harbors ===
The Caribbean coastline is marked by several natural harbors. However, Cristóbal, at the Caribbean terminus of the canal, had the only important port facilities in the late 1980s. The numerous islands of the Archipiélago de Bocas del Toro, near the Beaches of Costa Rica, provide an extensive natural roadstead and shield the banana port of Almirante. The more than 350 San Blas Islands near Colombia, are strung out over more than 160 kilometers (99 miles) along the sheltered Caribbean coastline.

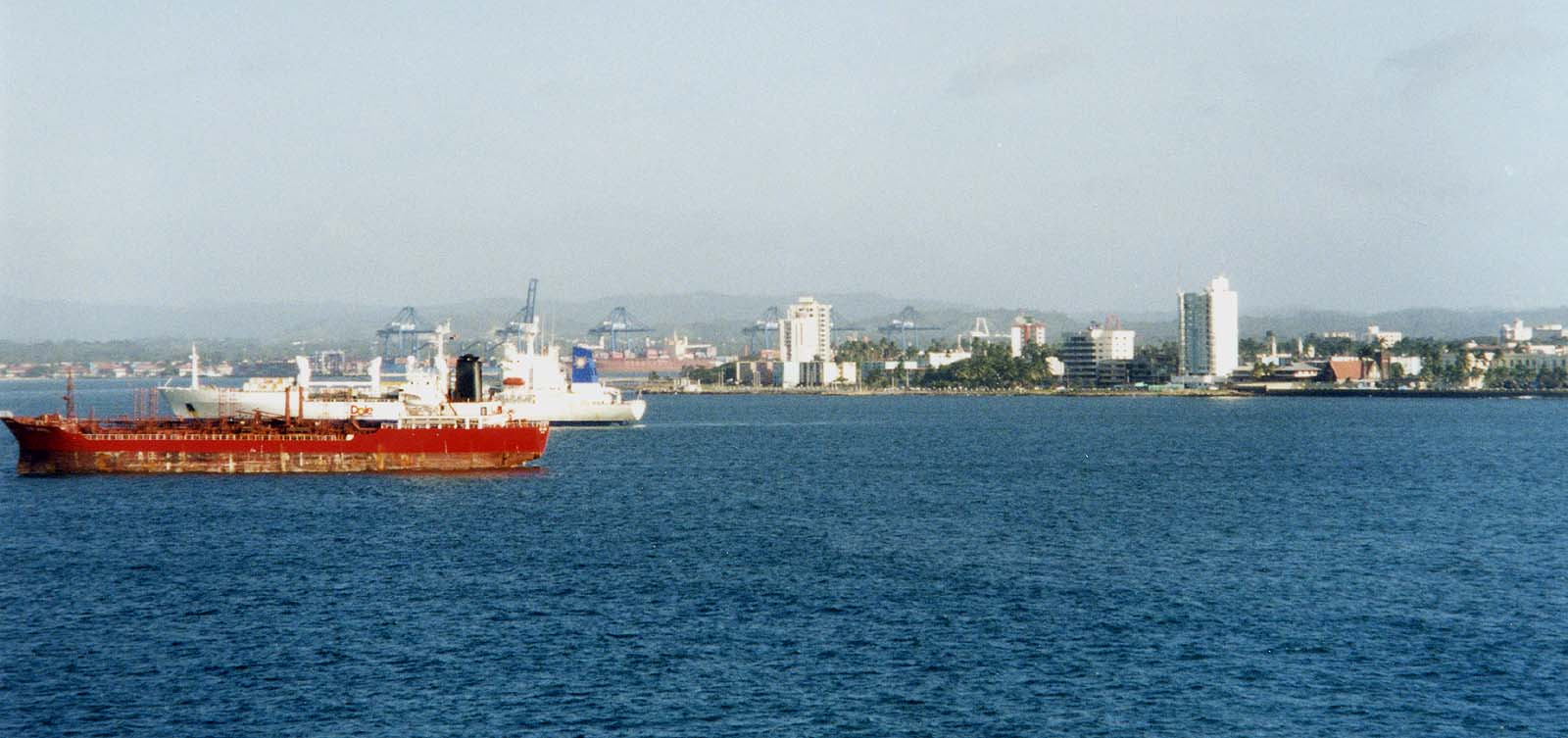
Colón Harbor, 2000

The terminal ports located at each end of the Panama Canal, namely the Port of Cristóbal, Colón, and the Port of Balboa, are ranked second and third respectively in Latin America in terms of the number of container units (TEU) handled. The Port of Balboa covers 182 hectares and contains four berths for containers and two multi-purpose berths. In total, the berths are over 2,400 meters (7,900 feet) long with alongside depth of 15 meters (49 feet). The Port of Balboa has 18 super post-Panamax and Panamax quay cranes and 44 gantry cranes. The Port of Balboa also contains 2,100 square meters (23,000 square feet) of warehouse space.

The Ports of Cristobal (encompassing the container terminals of Panama Ports Cristobal, Manzanillo International Terminal, and Colon Container Terminal) handled 2,210,720 TEU in 2009, second only to the Port of Santos, Brazil, in Latin America.

Excellent deep water ports capable of accommodating large VLCC (Very Large Crude Oil Carriers) are located at Charco Azul, Chiriquí (Pacific), and Chiriquí Grande, Bocas del Toro (Atlantic) near Panama's western border with Costa Rica. The Trans-Panama pipeline, running 131 kilometers (81 miles) across the isthmus, has operated between Charco Azul and Chiriquí Grande since 1979.

=== Climate ===
Panama map of Köppen climate classification

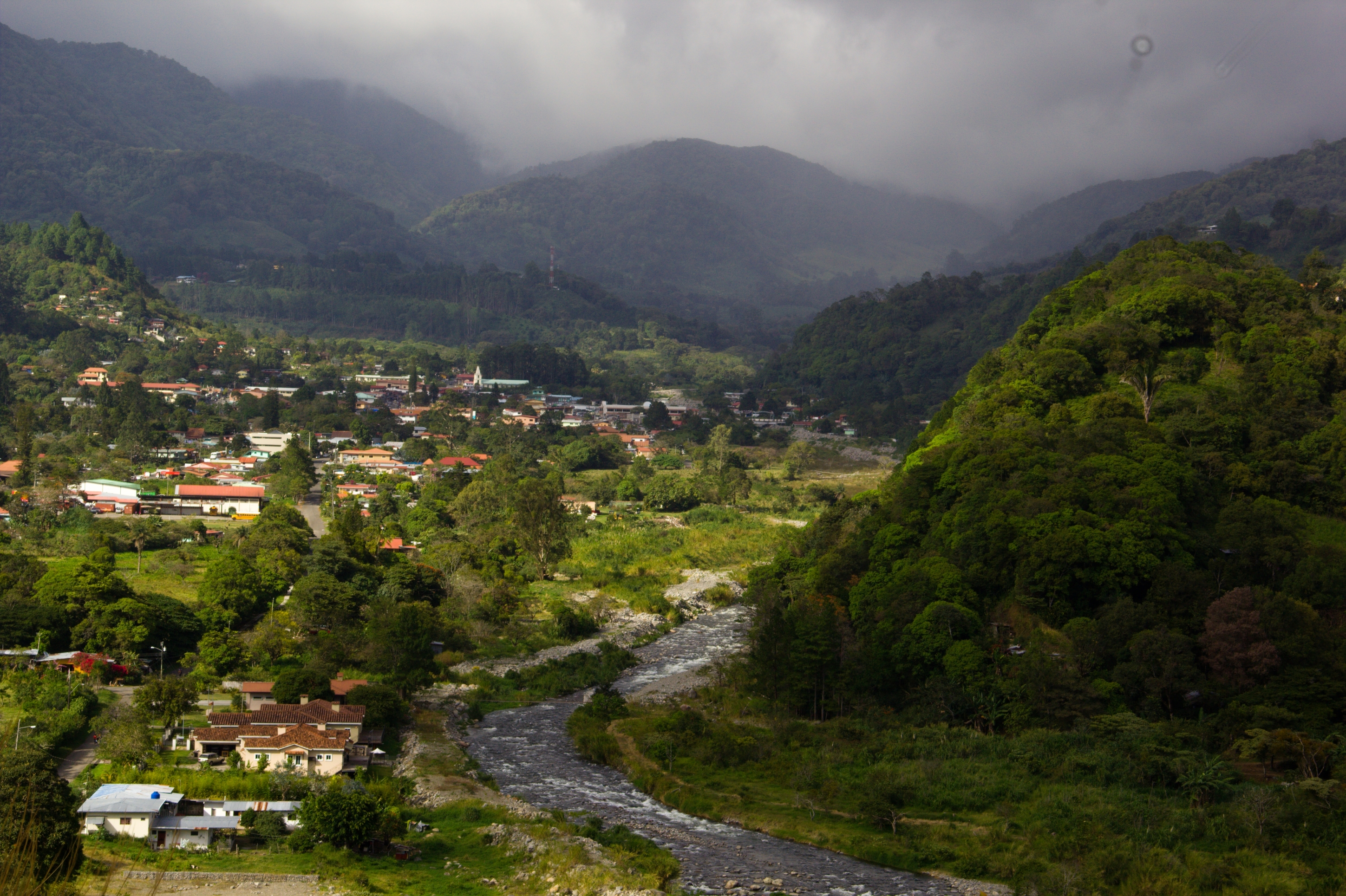
A cooler climate is common in the Panamanian highlands.

Panama has a tropical climate. Temperatures are uniformly high—as is the relative humidity—and there is little seasonal variation. Diurnal ranges are low; on a typical dry-season day in the capital city, the early morning minimum may be 24 °C (75.2 °F) and the afternoon maximum 30 °C (86.0 °F). The temperature seldom exceeds 32 °C (89.6 °F) for more than a short time. Temperatures on the Pacific side of the isthmus are somewhat lower than on the Caribbean, and breezes tend to rise after dusk in most parts of the country. Temperatures are markedly cooler in the higher parts of the mountain ranges, and frosts occur in the Cordillera de Talamanca in western Panama.

Climatic regions are determined less on the basis of temperature than on rainfall, which varies regionally from less than 1,300 millimeters (51.2 in) to more than 3,000 millimeters (118.1 in) per year. Almost all of the rain falls during the rainy season, which is usually from April to December, but varies in length from seven to nine months. In general, rainfall is much heavier on the Caribbean than on the Pacific side of the continental divide, due in part to occasional tropical cyclone activity nearby; Panama lies outside the Main Development Region. The annual average in Panama City is little more than half of that in Colón.

Panama is one of three countries in the world to be carbon-negative, meaning that it absorbs more carbon dioxide than it releases into the atmosphere. The others are Bhutan and Suriname.

Climate change has a negative impact on Panama, reducing the water level of the Panama Canal, meaning less ships make it through and affecting its economy.

=== Biodiversity ===
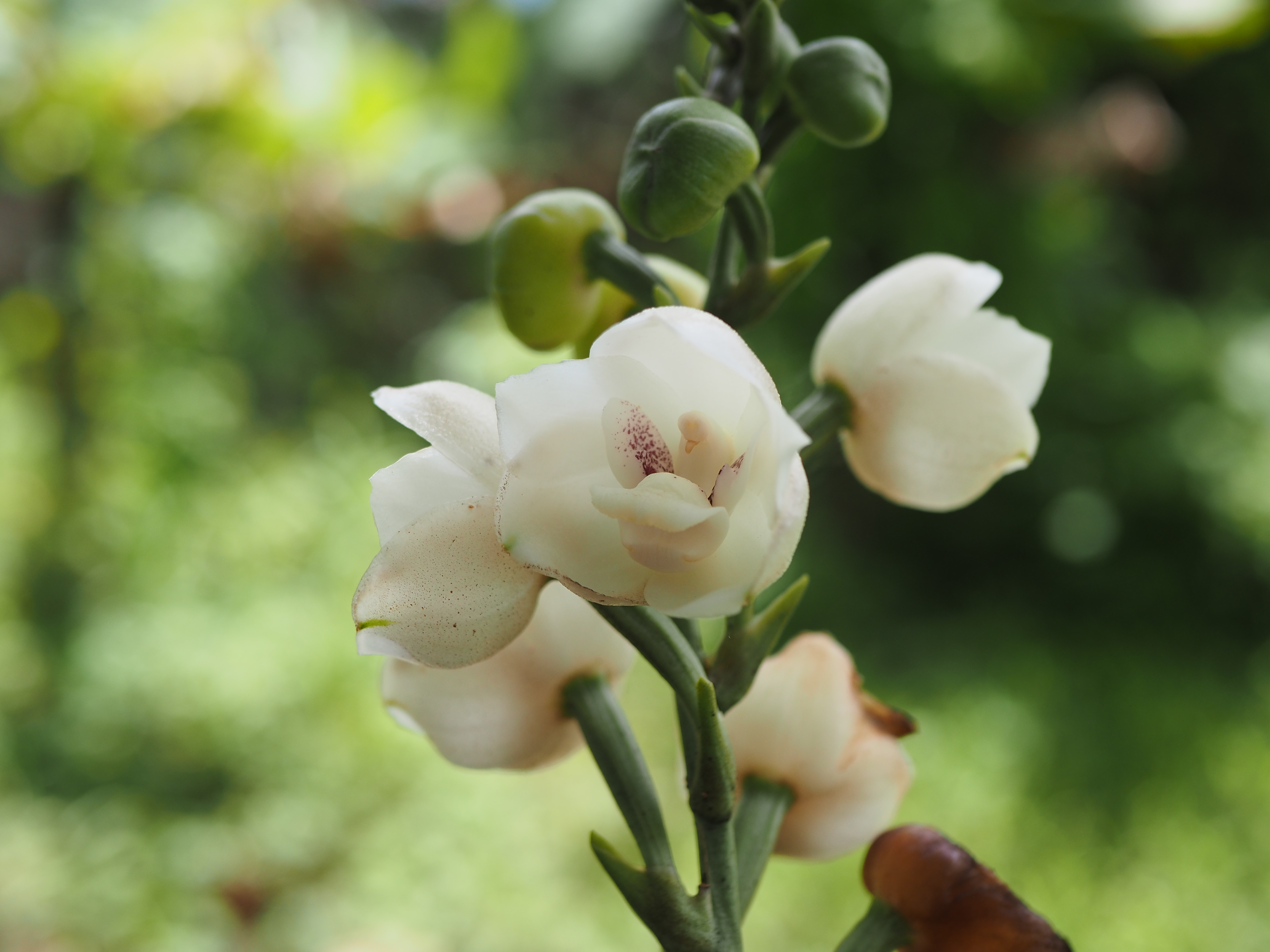
The Holy Spirit flower (Peristeria elata) was officially declared the national flower of Panama on November 21, 1980.

Panama's tropical environment supports an abundance of plants. Forests dominate, interrupted in places by grasslands, scrub, and crops. Although nearly 40% of Panama is still wooded, deforestation is a continuing threat to the rain-drenched woodlands. One of the causes of the deforestation is due to mining, and the construction of the Pan-American Highway. Tree cover has been reduced by more than 50 percent since the 1940s. Subsistence farming, widely practiced from the northeastern jungles to the southwestern grasslands, consists largely of corn, bean, and tuber plots. Mangrove swamps occur along parts of both coasts, with banana plantations occupying deltas near Costa Rica. In many places, a multi-canopied rainforest abuts the swamp on one side of the country and extends to the lower reaches of slopes on the other. Panama had a 2019 Forest Landscape Integrity Index mean score of 6.37/10, ranking it 78th globally out of 172 countries. Two-thirds of Panama's forests are located in indigenous territories, and 25% of Panama's territory is protected.

Panama has 16 national parks. Soberanía National Park has the greatest diversity of birds for birdwatching, with more than 525 birds inhabiting the area. It also has a variety of mammals such as capybaras and coyotes, reptiles like the green iguana, and amphibians such as the cane toad. Darien National Park, known for the Darien Gap, is the largest national park in Central America, and is also a UNESCO World Heritage site. There is also the Metropolitan National Park outside Panama City, and the largest island of Panama is Coiba Island Park.

There is a Harlequin Frog Festival every year in Panama to raise awareness, as this species is threatened by habitat destruction and pollution.

== Government and politics ==
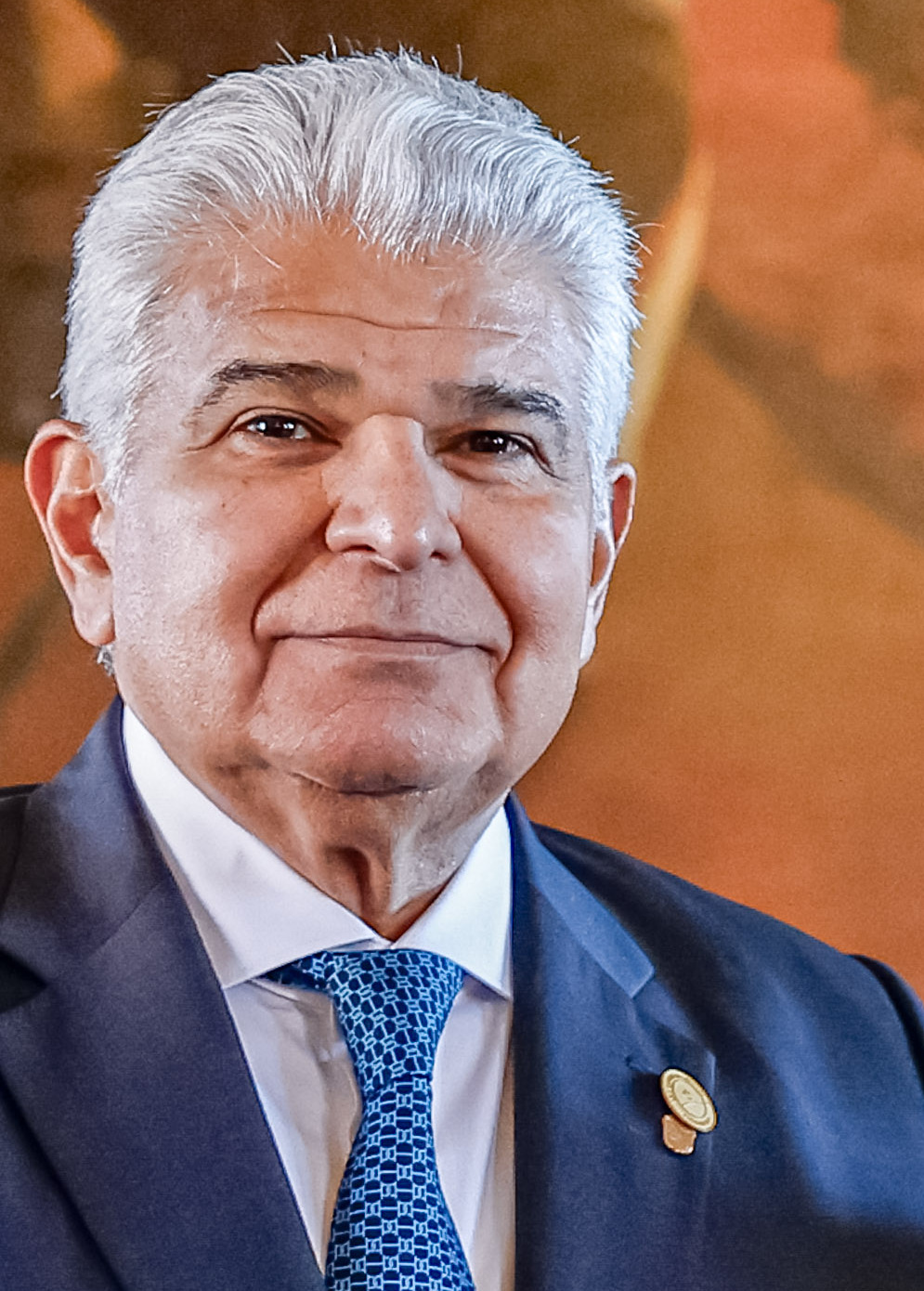
José Raúl Mulino
President

Vacant
Vice President

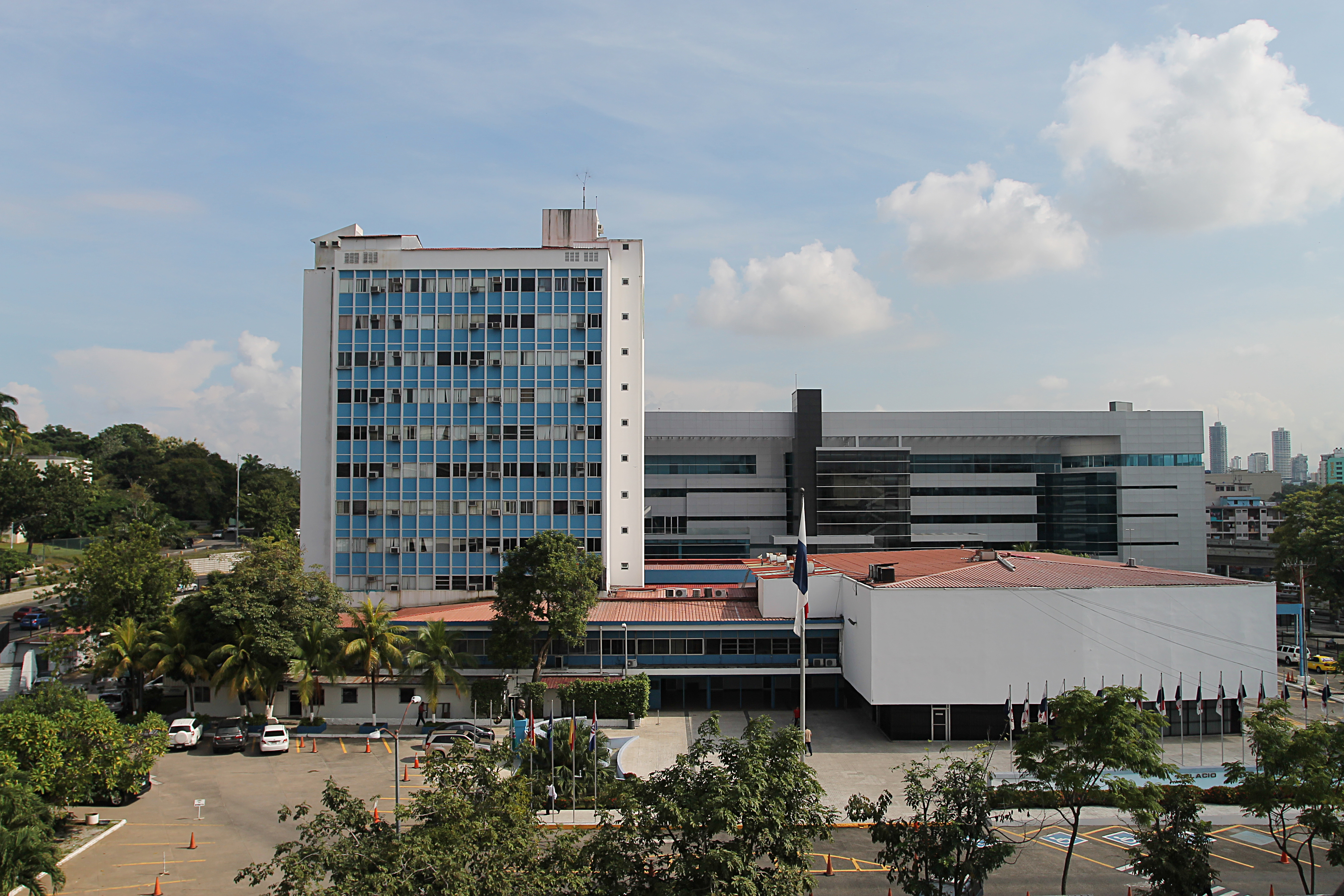
The National Assembly of Panama

Panama's politics take place in a framework of a presidential representative democratic republic, whereby the President of Panama is both head of state and head of government, and of a multi-party system. Executive power is exercised by the government. Legislative power is vested in both the government and the National Assembly. The judiciary is independent of the executive and the legislature.

National elections are universal for all citizens 18 years and older. National elections for the executive and legislative branches take place every five years. Members of the judicial branch (justices) are appointed by the head of state. Panama's National Assembly is elected by proportional representation in fixed electoral districts, so many smaller parties are represented. Presidential elections require a plurality; out of the five last presidents only ex-president Ricardo Martinelli has managed to be elected with over 50 percent of the popular vote.

Panama was an electoral democracy in 2024 as classified by the Regimes of the World index.

=== Political culture ===
Since the end of Manuel Noriega's military dictatorship in 1989, Panama has completed five peaceful transfers of power to opposing political factions. The political landscape is dominated by two major parties and various smaller parties, many of which are driven by individual leaders more than ideologies. Former president Martín Torrijos is the son of the general Omar Torrijos. He succeeded Mireya Moscoso, the widow of the former president Arnulfo Arias. Panama's most recent national elections took place on May 5, 2024.

=== Administrative divisions ===

Panama is divided into ten provinces with their respective local authorities (governors). Each is divided into districts and corregimientos (townships). Alongside that, there are six Comarcas (literally: "Shires") populated by a variety of indigenous groups.

Provinces

- Bocas del Toro
- Chiriquí
- Coclé
- Colón
- Darién
- Herrera
- Los Santos
- Panamá
- West Panamá
- Veraguas

Comarcas

- Emberá
- Guna Yala
- Naso Tjër Di
- Ngäbe-Buglé
- Madungandí
- Guna de Wargandí

=== Foreign relations ===
The United States cooperates with the Panamanian government in promoting economic, political, security, and social development through US and international agencies. Cultural ties between the two countries are strong, and many Panamanians go to the United States for higher education and advanced training.

Panama is the 96th most peaceful country in the world, according to the 2024 Global Peace Index.

=== Military ===
The Panama Defense Forces (and former National Guard) were the military forces of Panama until abolished by the United States Armed Forces after the United States invasion of Panama in 1989. In 1990 the Panamanian Public Forces were established and today are the national security forces of Panama. Panama is the second country in Latin America (the other being Costa Rica) to permanently abolish its standing army and instead utilize a public security force. As such, Panama has no military but does maintain armed police and security forces, a border force (SENAFRONT) and small air and maritime forces (SENAN). They are tasked with law enforcement and can perform limited military actions. Panamanian forces work with allies in maintaining security in the region, including the United States. In 2017, Panama signed the UN treaty on the Prohibition of Nuclear Weapons. Panama's Public Forces are administered by the Ministry of Public Security. In 2023, the Public forces included some 20,000 police officers, 3,600 are uniformed personnel in the naval/air force SEBAB and approximately 4,500 persons in the border force SENAFRONT (divided into 6 brigades, including a special forces brigade). The SENAN air and naval forces are equipped with helicopters, transport planes and small boats, including small patrol boats (but no large naval vessels). In 2024, the force was recorded as having approximately 19 small vessels and 24 aircraft.

== Economy ==
GDP per capita development Panama since 1950

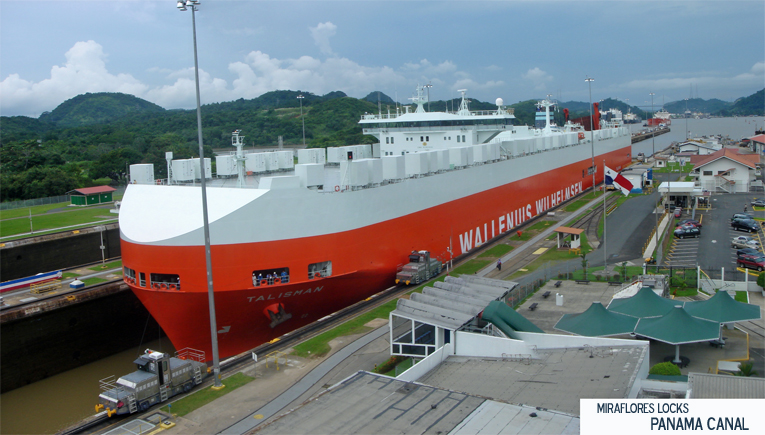
A Panamax ship in transit through the Miraflores locks, Panama Canal

As of 2025 Panama had a GDP of 90.41 billion USD. This equated to 19,800 USD per capita. In 2025, Panama also had an unemployment rate of 8%, an increase from 2.7 percent in 2012. In more recent years, Panama's economy has experienced a boom, with growth in real gross domestic product (GDP) averaging over 10.4 percent in 2006–2008. Panama's economy was among the fastest growing and best managed in Latin America. The Latin Business Chronicle predicted that Panama would be the fastest growing economy in Latin America during the five-year period from 2010 to 2014. In 2025, Panama ranked as the second fastest-growing economy in Latin America.

On the Human Development Index, Panama ranked 59th in 2025. Even though Panama is regarded as a high-income country, it still remains a country of stark contrasts perpetuated by dramatic educational disparities. Between 2015 and 2017, poverty at less than US$5.5 a day fell from 15.4 to an estimated 14.1 percent.

As of 2025 Panama has a gross national debt of 59.6% of GDP. In 2024, Panama exported 37.37 billion USD worth of exports, an increase from 35.71 billion USD in 2022.

=== Economic sectors ===
Panama's economy, because of its key geographic location, is mainly based on a well-developed service sector, especially commerce, tourism, and trading. The handover of the Canal and military installations by the United States has given rise to large construction projects and the canal has a significant effect on the overall economy of Panama. In 2025, it was recorded that the canal accounted for 7.7% of Panama's GDP and at least 20% of the government revenues were from dividends from the canal.

The natural resource industries of Panama include copper extraction, mahogany forests, shrimp farming and hydropower.

=== Panama as a tax haven ===
Countries with politicians, public officials or close associates implicated in the Panama Papers on April 15, 2016

Since the early 20th century, Panama has with the revenues from the canal built the largest Regional Financial Center (IFC) in Central America, with consolidated assets being more than three times that of Panama's GDP. The banking sector employs more than 24,000 people directly. Financial intermediation contributed 9.3 percent of GDP. Stability has been a key strength of Panama's financial sector, which has benefited from the country's favorable economic and business climate. Banking institutions report sound growth and solid financial earnings. The banking supervisory regime is largely compliant with the Basel Core Principles for Effective Banking Supervision. As a regional financial center, Panama exports some banking services, mainly to Latin America, and plays an important role in the country's economy. However, Panama still cannot compare to the position held by Hong Kong or Singapore as financial centers in Asia.

Panama still has a reputation worldwide for being a tax haven but has agreed to enhanced transparency, especially since the release in 2016 of the Panama Papers. Significant progress has been made to improve full compliance with anti-money laundering recommendations. Panama was removed from the FATF gray list in February 2016. The European Union also removed Panama from its tax haven blacklist in 2018. However efforts remain to be made, and the IMF repeatedly mentions the need to strengthen financial transparency and fiscal structure.

=== Transportation ===
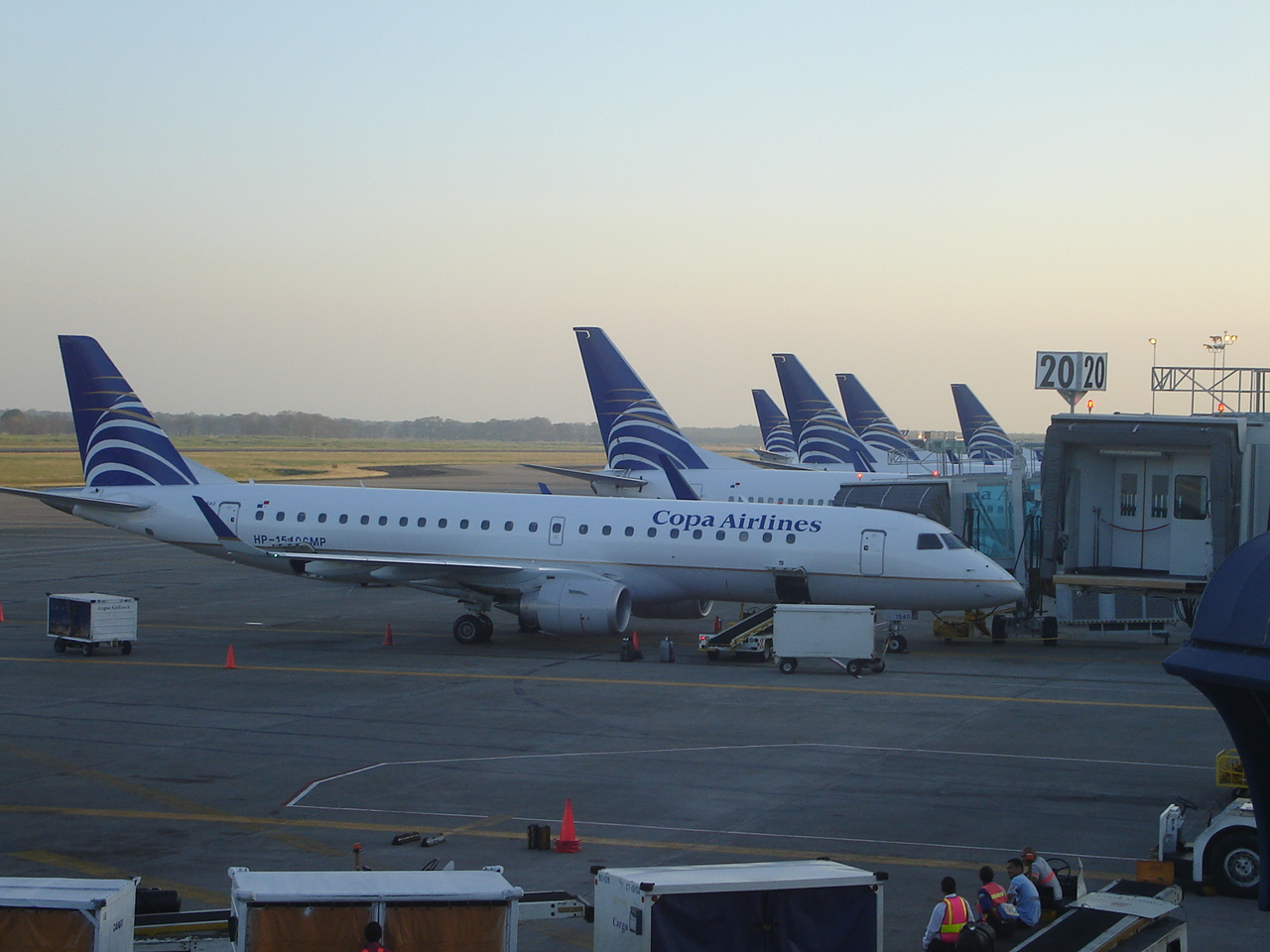
Tocumen International Airport, Central America's largest airport

Panama is home to Tocumen International Airport, Central America's largest airport and the hub for Copa Airlines, the flag carrier of Panama. Additionally, there are more than 60 smaller airfields in the country. (See list of airports in Panama).

Panama's roads, traffic and transportation systems are generally safe, though night driving is difficult and in some cases, restricted by local authorities. This usually occurs in informal settlements. Traffic in Panama moves on the right, and Panamanian law requires that drivers and passengers wear seat belts. Highways are generally well-developed for a Latin American country. The Pan-American Highway travels from north to south through the country, starting at the border with Costa Rica, but ending short of Colombia at an area called the Darién Gap.

The Panama City area is well served by the nearly 150 bus routes publicly operated MiBus system along with the two rapid transit lines of the Panama Metro. Prior to the government operation of bus routes, Panama was served by privately operated buses called "diablo rojos" (English: red devils), which were typically retired school buses from the United States painted in bright colors by their operators. The "diablo rojos" that remain are now mainly used in rural areas.

In May 2022, in order to increase the supply of lower-carbon aviation fuel, the government of Panama and energy companies announced its plan to develop a major and advanced biorefinery of aviation fuel in the country.

=== Tourism ===
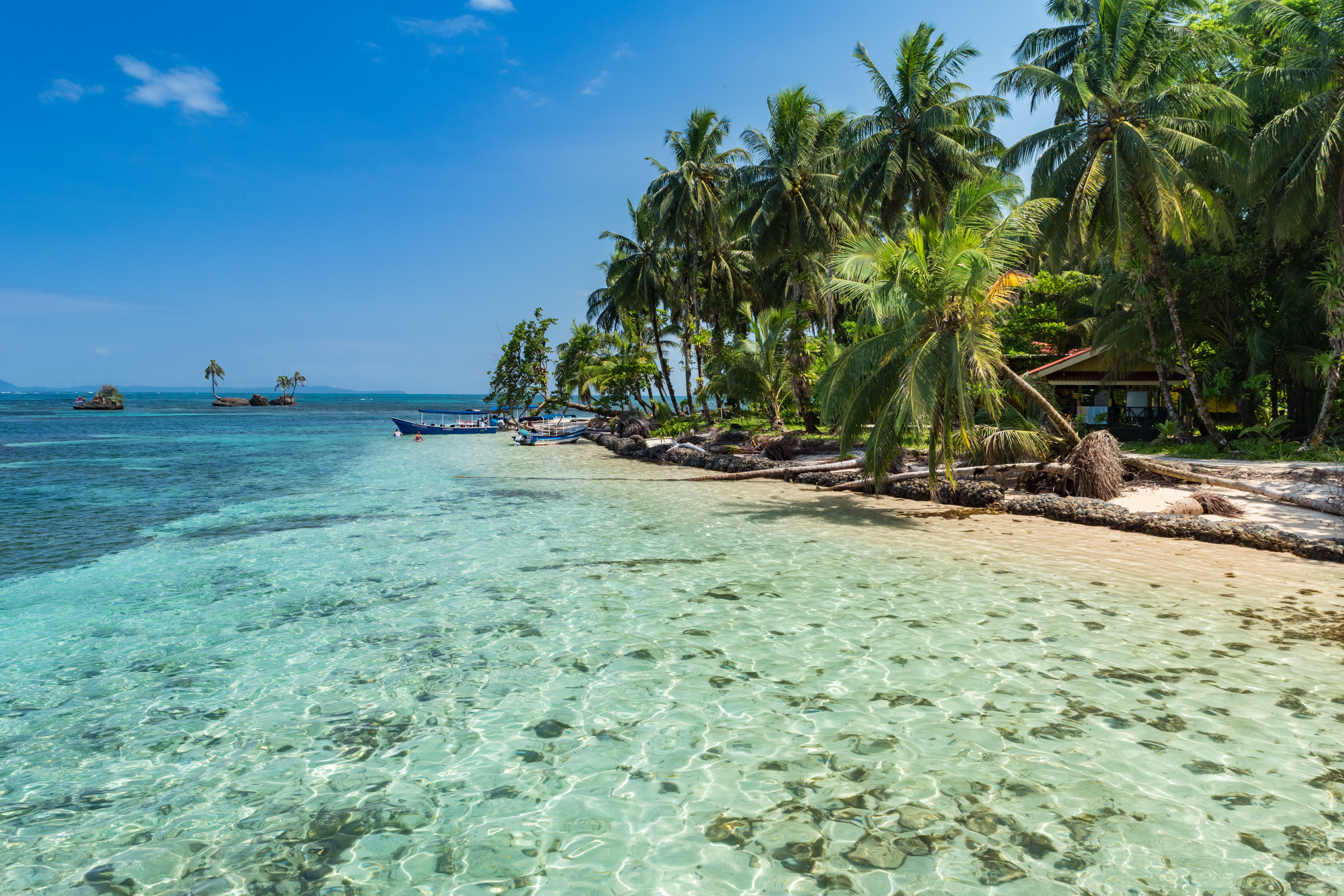
Zapatilla Island, Panama

In 2025, it was reported that over two million tourists visit Panama annually. In August 2025 alone, there were 194,422 visitors to Panama. This includes several hundred thousand visitors from cruise ships, for example, in 2023 around 320,000 visitors visited Panama from cruise ships. In 2025, the five highest countries of origin for tourists were the United States, Colombia, Venezuela, Ecuador, Brazil and Spain.

Tourism in Panama has continued to grow. In 2023, Panama attracted 2.518 million visitors, bringing 5.432 billion USD into the Panama economy (a 20% growth compared to 2019). In 2012, 4.585 billion US dollars entered into the Panamanian economy as a result of tourism. This accounted for 11.34 percent of the gross national product of the country, The number of tourists who arrived that year was 2.2 million.

Economic incentives for migrants, retirees and others have caused Panama to be regarded as a relatively good place to retire. Real estate developers in Panama have increased the number of tourism destinations in the past five years because of interest in these visitor incentives.

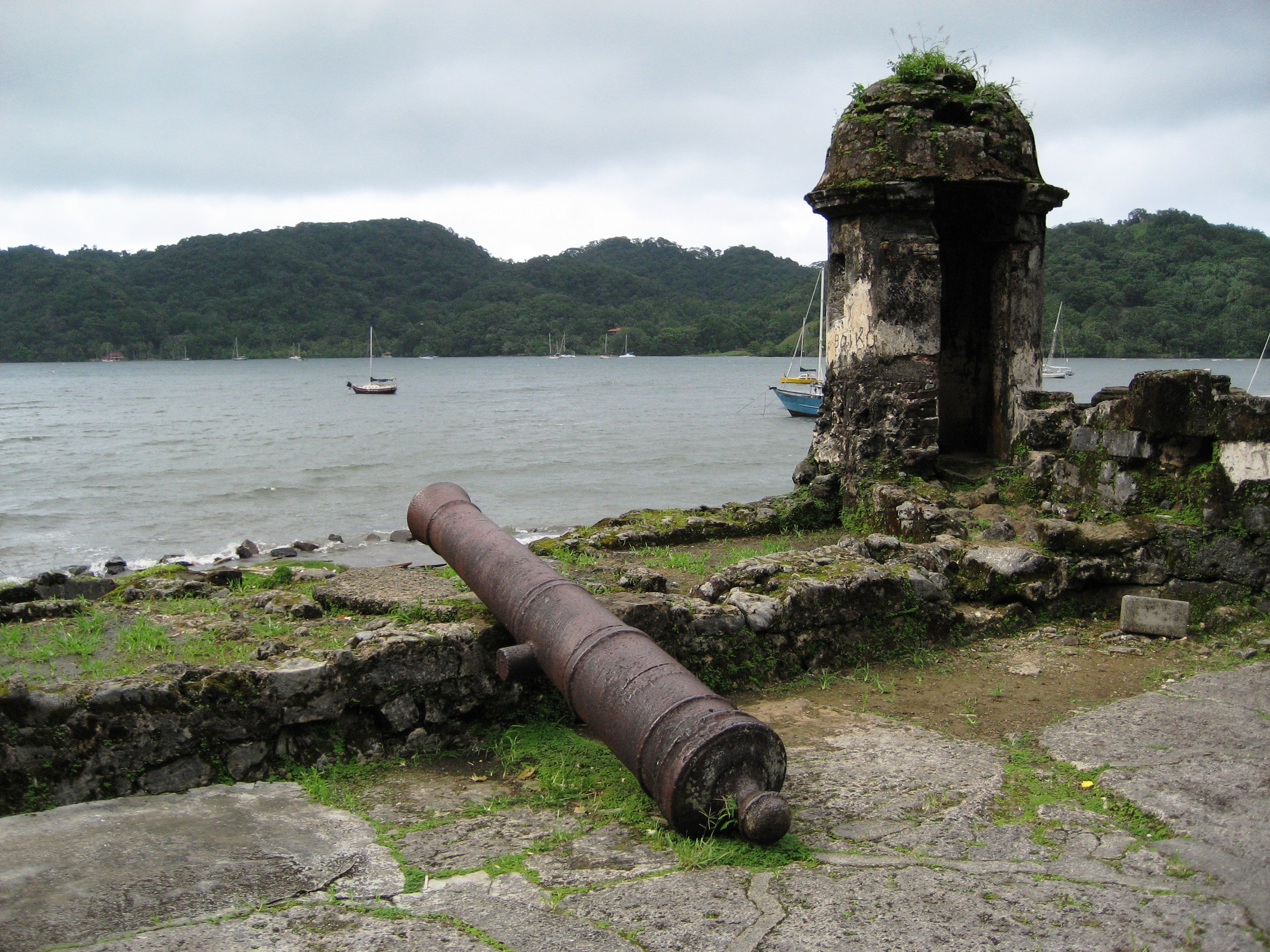
Fortifications on the Caribbean Side of Panama: Portobelo-San Lorenzo were declared a World Heritage Site by UNESCO in 1980.

Panama enacted Law No. 80 in 2012 to promote foreign investment in tourism. Law 80 replaced an older Law 8 of 1994. Law 80 provides 100 percent exemption from income tax and real estate taxes for 15 years, duty-free imports for construction materials and equipment for five years, and a capital gains tax exemption for five years.

=== Currency ===
The Panamanian currency is officially the balboa, fixed at a rate of 1:1 with the United States dollar since Panamanian independence in 1903. In practice, Panama is dollarized: U.S. dollars are legal tender and used for all paper currency, and whilst Panama has its own coinage, U.S. coins are widely used. Because of the tie to US dollars, Panama has traditionally had low inflation. According to the Economic Commission for Latin America and the Caribbean, Panama's inflation in 2006 was 2.0 percent as measured by a weighted Consumer Price Index.

The balboa replaced the Colombian peso in 1904 after Panama's independence. Balboa banknotes were printed in 1941 by President Arnulfo Arias. They were recalled several days later, giving them the name "The Seven Day Dollars". The notes were burned by the new government, but occasionally balboa notes can be found in collections. These were the only banknotes ever issued by Panama and US notes have circulated both before and since.

On April 28, 2022, Panama's lawmakers approved a bill that would legalize and regulate the use of bitcoin and other cryptocurrencies. The bill covers using cryptocurrency, trading it, tokenizing precious metals, and issuing digital securities, among other related topics. Its passing will also allow citizens to use their cryptocurrency holdings to pay taxes. On July 14, 2023, the Supreme Court of Justice declared the bill unenforceable.

=== International trade ===
The high levels of Panamanian trade are in large part from the Colón Free Trade Zone, the largest free trade zone in the Western Hemisphere. In 2024, the Colón Free Zone recorded a total movement of good worth 24.7 billion USD.

Panama's economy is also supported by the trade and export of coffee and other agricultural products including bananas, palm oil, cane sugar and shrimp. In 2023, Panama exported some 3,000 metric tons of coffee, mostly to the United States. The primary export of Panama however is copper ore. In 2022, the copper ore export trade from Panama was valued at 3 billion USD.

The Bilateral Investment Treaty (BIT) between the governments of the United States and Panama was signed on October 27, 1982. The treaty protects US investment and assists Panama in its efforts to develop its economy by creating conditions more favorable for US private investment and thereby strengthening the development of its private sector. The BIT was the first such treaty signed by the US in the Western Hemisphere. A Panama–United States Trade Promotion Agreement (TPA) was signed in 2007, approved by Panama on July 11, 2007, and by US President Obama on October 21, 2011, and the agreement entered into force on October 31, 2012. In 2019, the Panama also signed the Panama–United States Trade Promotion Agreement which eliminates tariffs to US services.

== Demographics ==
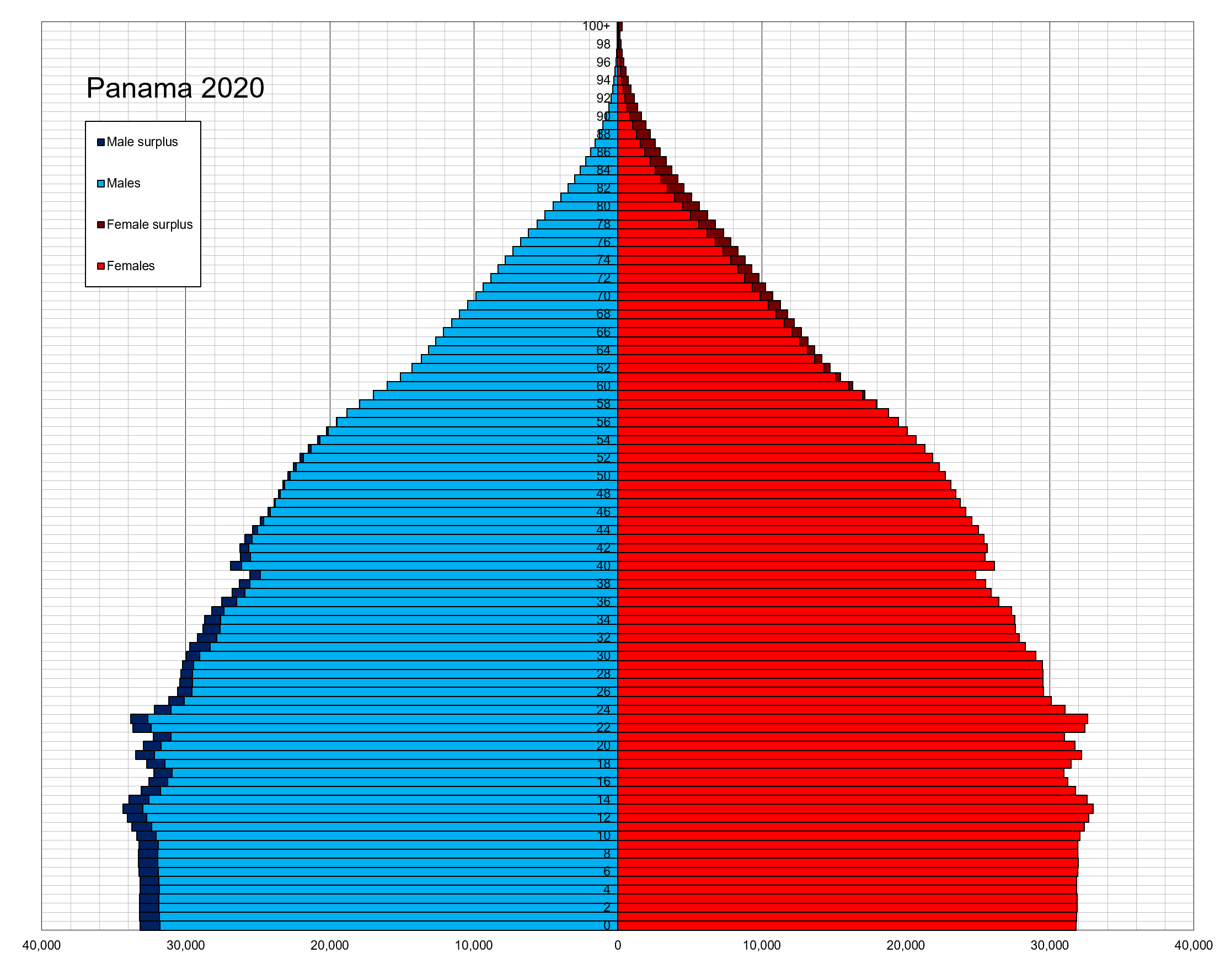
Population pyramid, 2020

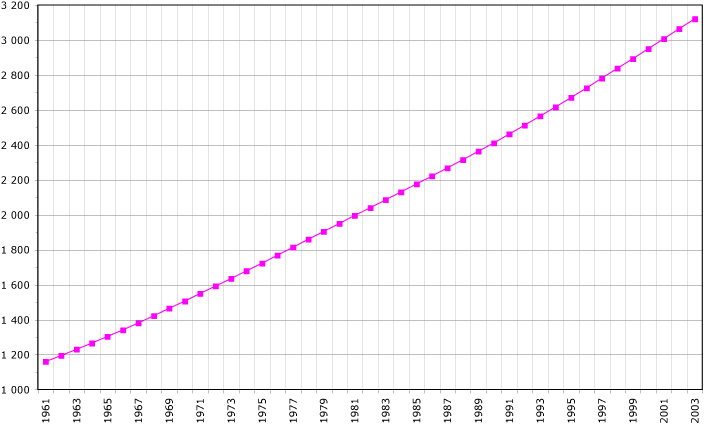
Panama's population, 1961–2003

In 2025, Panama had an estimated population of 4,600,000. This is an increase from 4,351,267 in 2021. The proportion of the population aged less than 15 in 2010 was 29 percent. 64.5 percent of the population was between 15 and 65, with 6.6 percent of the population 65 years or older. More than half the population lives in the Panama City–Colón metropolitan corridor, which spans several cities. Panama's urban population exceeds 75 percent, making Panama's population the most urbanized in Central America.

=== Largest cities ===
These are the 10 largest Panamanian cities and towns. Most of Panama's largest cities are part of the Panama City Metropolitan Area.

Largest cities or towns in Panama City Population
Rank	Name	Province	Pop.
1	Panama City	Panamá	430,299
2	San Miguelito	Panamá	315,019
3	Las Cumbres	Panamá	127,440
4	La Chorrera	Panamá Oeste	118,521
5	Tocumen	Panamá	113,174
6	Pacora	Panamá	103,960
7	Arraiján	Panamá Oeste	96,676
8	David	Chiriquí	81,957
9	Vista Alegre	Panamá Oeste	55,114
10	Santiago de Veraguas	Veraguas	51,236

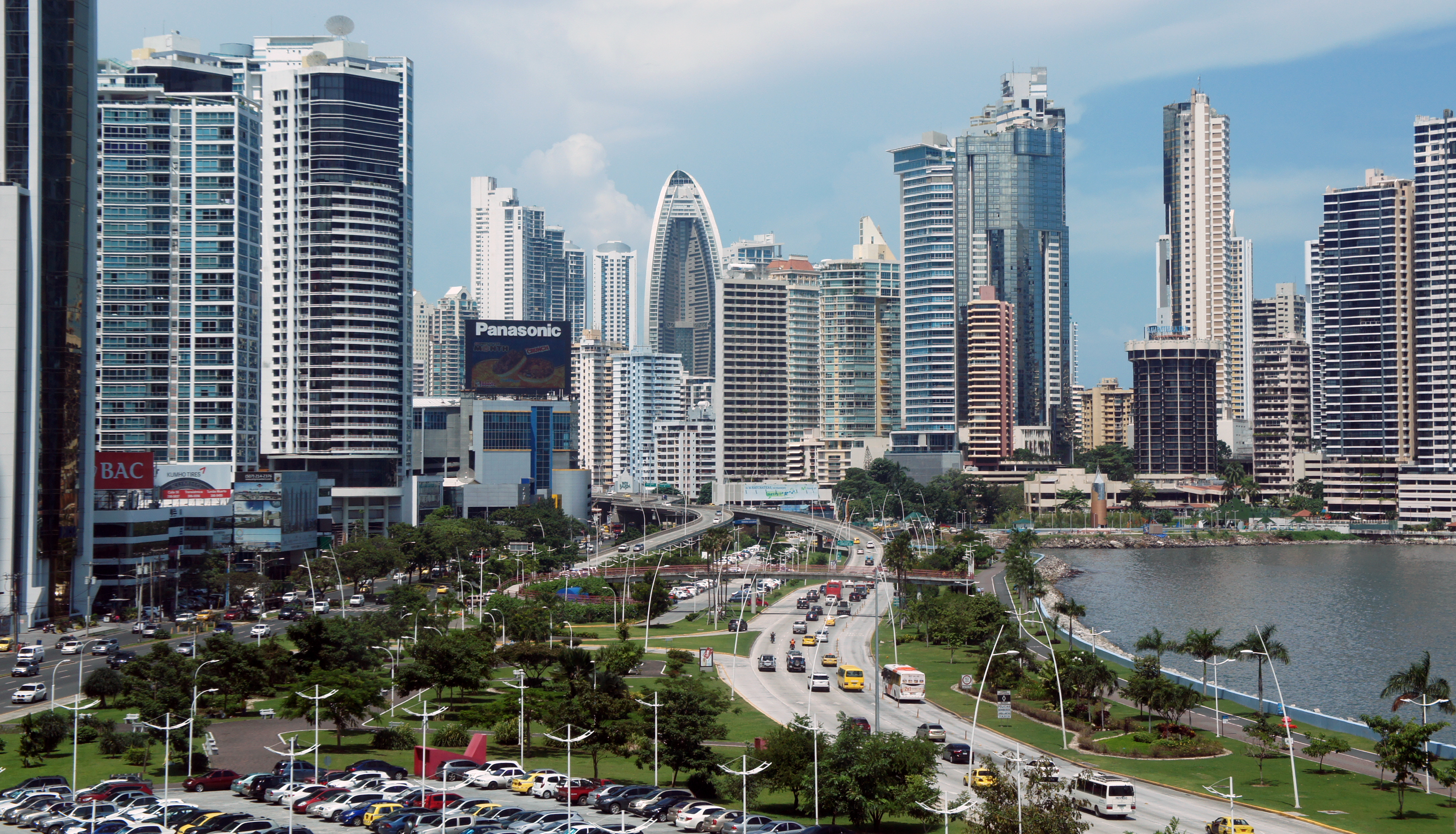
Panama City, Panama's capital

=== Ethnic groups ===
In 2010, the population was 65 percent Mestizo (mixed White, Indigenous), 12.3 percent Indigenous, 9.2 percent Black or African descent, 6.8 percent Mulatto, and 6.7 percent White. However, by the 2023 census reports 698,114 people now self‑identify as indigenous, equivalent to 17.2% of Panama's total population.

The Amerindian population includes seven ethnic groups: the Ngäbe, Guna, Emberá, Buglé, Wounaan, Naso Tjërdi (Teribe), and Bri Bri.

Most Afro-Panamanians live on the Panama–Colón metropolitan area, the Darién Province, La Palma, and Bocas del Toro Province. Areas in Panama City with significant Afro-Panamian influence Rio Abajo and Casco Viejo. Black Panamanians are descendants of African slaves brought to the Americas in the Atlantic slave trade. The second wave of black people brought to Panama came from the Caribbean during the construction of the Panama Canal.

Panama also has a considerable Chinese and Indian population brought to work on the canal during its construction. Most Chinese Panamanians reside in Panama City. Chinese Panamanians compose 4% of the population of Panama. Europeans and White Panamanians are a minority in Panama forming 6.7% of the population. Panama is also home to a small Arab community that has mosques and practices Islam, as well as a Jewish community and many synagogues.

=== Languages ===
Spanish is the official and dominant language. The Spanish spoken in Panama is known as Panamanian Spanish. About 93 percent of the population speak Spanish as their first language. Many citizens who hold jobs at international levels, or at business corporations, speak both English and Spanish. About 14 percent of Panamanians speak English; this number is expected to rise because Panama now requires English classes in its public schools. Native languages, such as Ngäbere, are spoken throughout the country, mostly in their native territories. Over 400,000 Panamanians keep their native languages and customs. About 4 percent speak French and 1 percent speak Arabic. There was also a French creole spoken in Panama, San Miguel Creole French, which has since gone extinct.

=== Religion ===
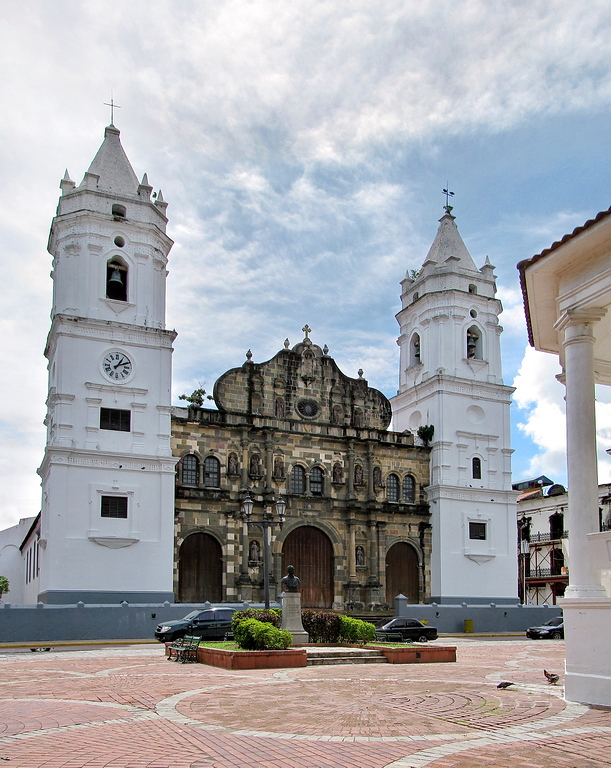
Colonial Metropolitan Cathedral of Panama City

Christianity is the main religion in Panama. An official survey carried out by the government estimated in 2015 that 63.2% of the population, or 2,549,150 people, identifies itself as Roman Catholic, and 25% as evangelical Protestant, or 1,009,740.

The Baháʼí Faith community in Panama is estimated at 2% of the national population, or about 60,000 including about 10% of the Guaymí population.

The Jehovah's Witnesses were the next largest congregation comprising the 1.4% of the population, followed by the Adventist Church and the Church of Jesus Christ of Latter-day Saints with 0.6%. Smaller groups include the Buddhist, Jewish, Episcopalian, Muslim and Hindu communities. Indigenous religions include Ibeorgun (among Guna) and Mamatata (among Ngäbe). There are also a small number of Rastafarians.

=== Education ===
During the 16th century, education in Panama was provided by Jesuits. Public education began in Panama soon after it seceded from Colombia in 1903. The first efforts were guided by a paternalistic view of the goals of education, as evidenced in comments made in a 1913 meeting of the First Panamanian Educational Assembly, "The cultural heritage given to the child should be determined by the social position he will or should occupy. For this reason education should be different in accordance with the social class to which the student should be related." This elitist focus changed rapidly under US influence.

In 2010, it was estimated that 94.1 percent of the population was literate (94.7 percent of males and 93.5 percent of females). Education in Panama is compulsory for all children between ages 6 and 15. In recent decades, school enrollment at all levels, but especially at upper levels, has increased significantly. Panama participates in the PISA exams, but due to debts and unsatisfactory exam results, it postponed participation until 2018.

== Culture ==
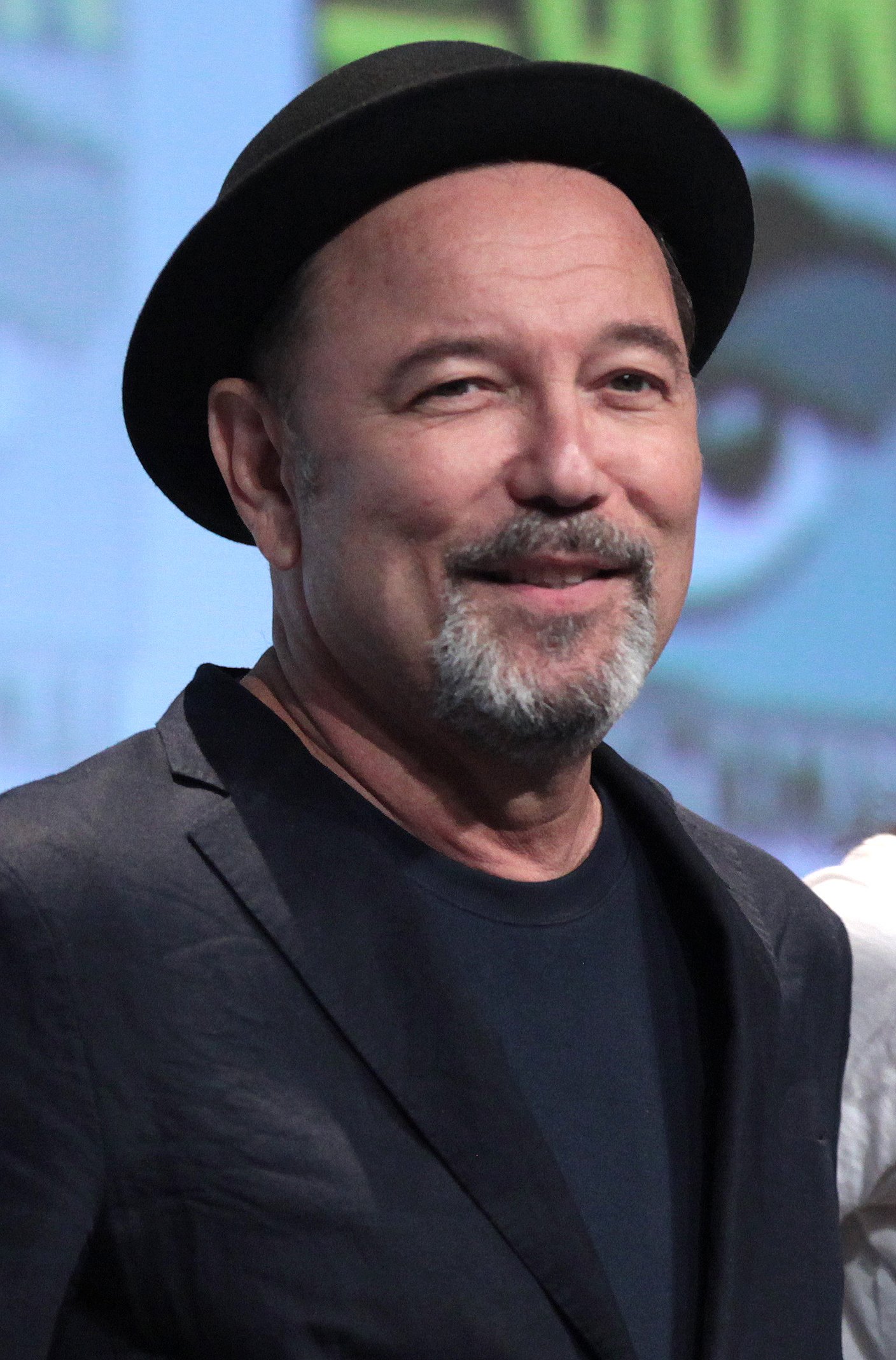
Rubén Blades is an icon singer of the Salsa music.

The culture of Panama derives from European music, art and traditions brought by the Spanish to Panama. Hegemonic forces have created hybrid forms blending African and Indigenous Panamanian culture with European culture. For example, the tamborito is a Spanish dance with African rhythms, themes and dance moves.

Dance is typical of the diverse cultures in Panama. The local folklore can be experienced at a multitude of festivals, through dances and traditions handed down from generation to generation. Local cities host live reggae en español, reggaeton, haitiano (compas), jazz, blues, salsa, reggae, and rock music performances.

=== Holidays and festivities ===
The Christmas parade, known as El desfile de Navidad, is celebrated in the capital, Panama City. This holiday is celebrated on December 25. The floats in the parade are decorated in the Panamanian colors, and women wear dresses called pollera and men dress in traditional montuno. In addition, the marching band in the parade, consisting of drummers, keeps crowds entertained. In the city, a big Christmas tree is lit with Christmas lights, and everybody surrounds the tree and sings Christmas carols.

=== Literature ===
The first literature relating to Panama can be dated to 1535. A modern literary movement appeared from the mid-19th century onwards. Panamanian novels have been heavily influenced by the Panama Canal and its affect on Panama's growth, economy and society.

=== Handicraft ===
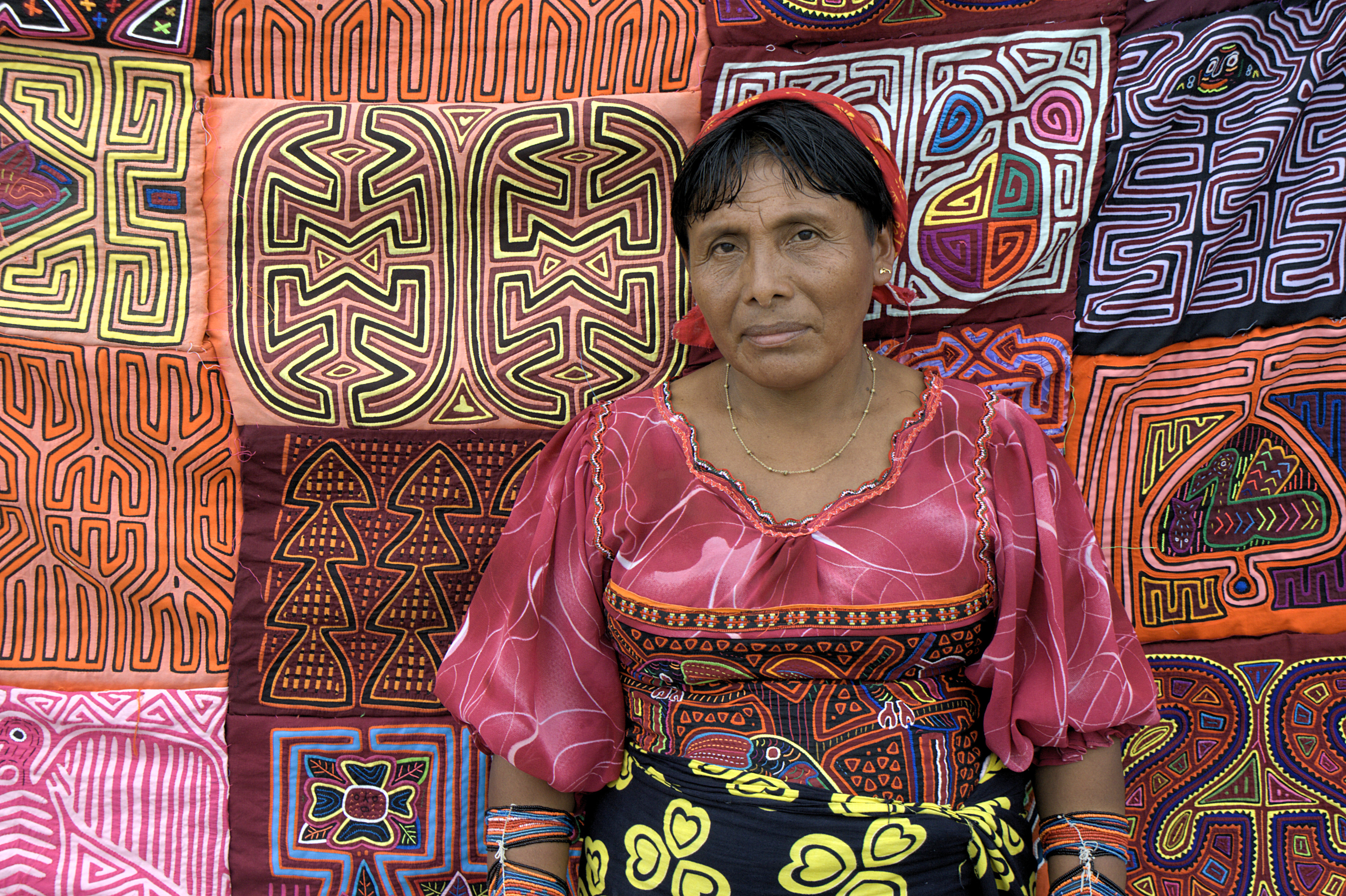
Guna woman selling Molas in Panama City

Outside Panama City, regional festivals take place throughout the year featuring local musicians and dancers. Panama's blended culture is reflected in traditional products, such as woodcarvings, ceremonial masks and pottery, as well as in Panama's architecture, cuisine and festivals. In earlier times, baskets were woven for utilitarian uses, but now many villages rely almost exclusively on income from the baskets they produce for tourists.

An example of undisturbed, unique culture in Panama is that of the Guna who are known for molas. Mola is the Guna word for blouse, but the term mola has come to mean the elaborate embroidered panels made by Guna women, that make up the front and back of a Guna woman's blouse. They are several layers of cloth, varying in color, that are loosely stitched together, made using a reverse appliqué process.

=== Clothing ===
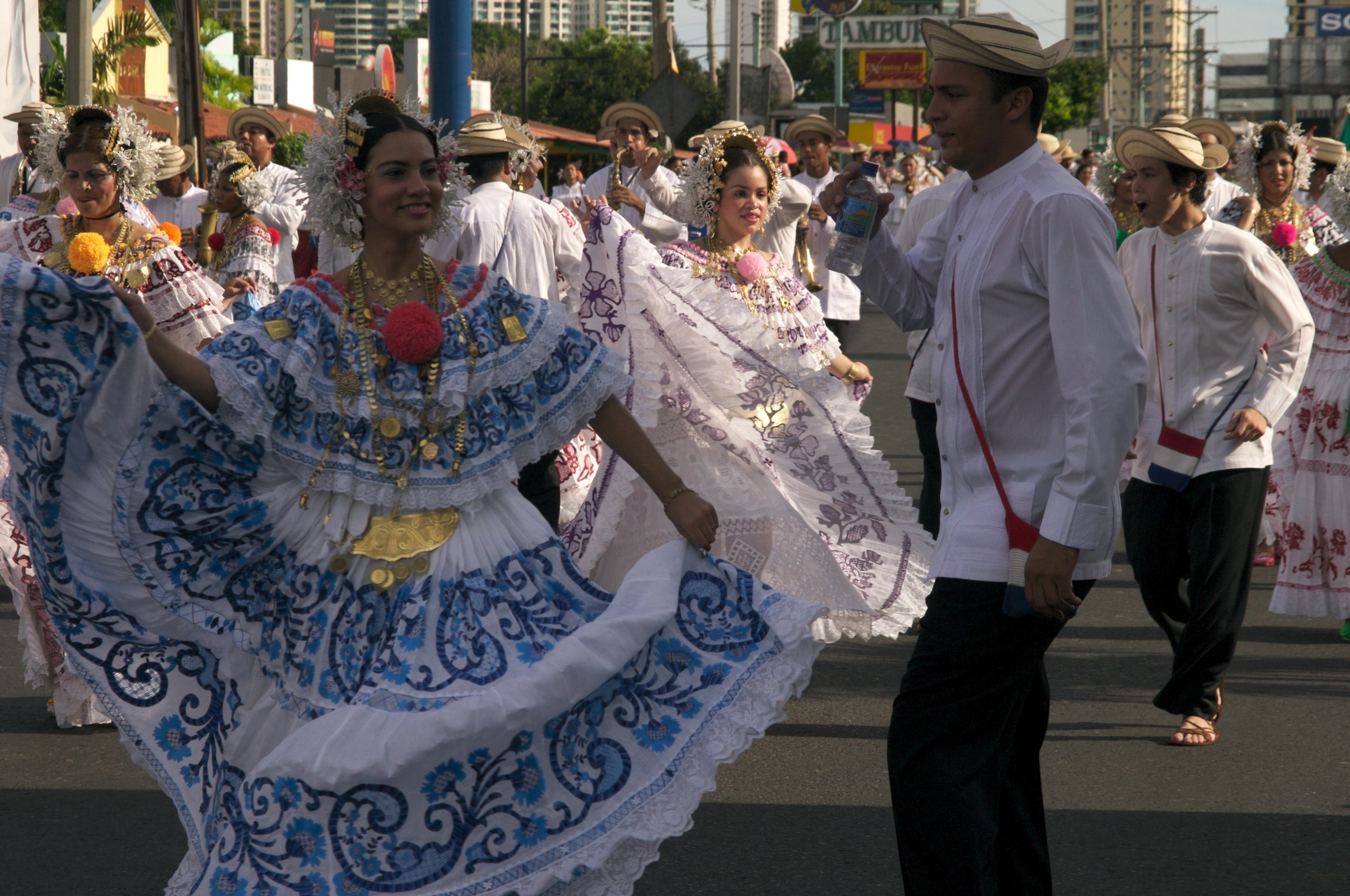
A couple dancing Panamanian Cumbia

Panamanian men's traditional clothing, called montuno, consists of white cotton shirts, short trousers and woven straw hats (pintados)

The traditional women's clothing is the pollera, a long full dress typically made from white cotton or cambric fine linen. It is white, and is usually about 13 yards of material. It originated in Spain in the 16th century, and by the early 1800s it was typical in Panama, worn by female servants, especially wet nurses (De Zarate 5). Later, it was adopted by upper-class women. Kuna women traditionally wear mola pattern blouses. The original pollera consists of a ruffled blouse worn off the shoulders and a skirt with gold buttons. The skirt is also ruffled, so that when it is lifted up, it looks like a peacock's tail or a mantilla fan. The designs on the skirt and blouse are usually flowers or birds. Two large matching pom poms (mota) are on the front and back, four ribbons hang from the front and back from the waist, five gold chains (caberstrillos) hang from the neck to the waist, a gold cross or medallion on a black ribbon is worn as a choker, and a silk purse is worn at the waistline. Earrings (zaricillos) are usually gold or coral. Slippers usually match the color of the pollera. Hair is usually worn in a bun, held by three large gold combs that have pearls (tembleques) worn like a crown. Quality pollera can cost up to $10,000, and may take a year to complete.

Today, there are different types of polleras; the pollera de gala consists of a short-sleeved ruffle skirt blouse, two full-length skirts and a petticoat. Girls wear tembleques in their hair. Gold coins and jewelry are added to the outfit. The pollera montuna is a daily dress, with a blouse, a skirt with a solid color, a single gold chain, and pendant earrings and a natural flower in the hair. Instead of an off-the-shoulder blouse it is worn with a fitted white jacket that has shoulder pleats and a flared hem. Traditional clothing in Panama is sometimes worn in parades, along with traditional dancing.

=== Cuisine ===
Since Panama's cultural heritage is influenced by many ethnicities the traditional cuisine of the country includes ingredients from many cultures, from all over the world: a mix of Spanish, Indigenous Panamanian, and African techniques, dishes, and ingredients, reflecting its diverse population. Since Panama is a land bridge between two continents, it has a large variety of tropical fruits, vegetables and herbs that are used in native cooking. The famous fish market known as the "Mercado de Mariscos" offers fresh seafood and Ceviche, a seafood dish. Small shops along the street which are called kiosco and Empanada, which is a typical Latin American pastry, including a variety of different ingredients, either with meat or vegetarian, mostly fried. Another kind of pastry is the pastelito which is typically used interchangebaly with the term empanadas. Pastelitos are typically filled with meat and eating during holiday periods.

Typical Panamanian foods are mild-flavored, without the pungency of some of Panama's Latin American and Caribbean neighbors. Common ingredients are maize, rice, wheat flour, plantains, yuca (cassava), beef, chicken, pork and seafood.

=== Sports ===
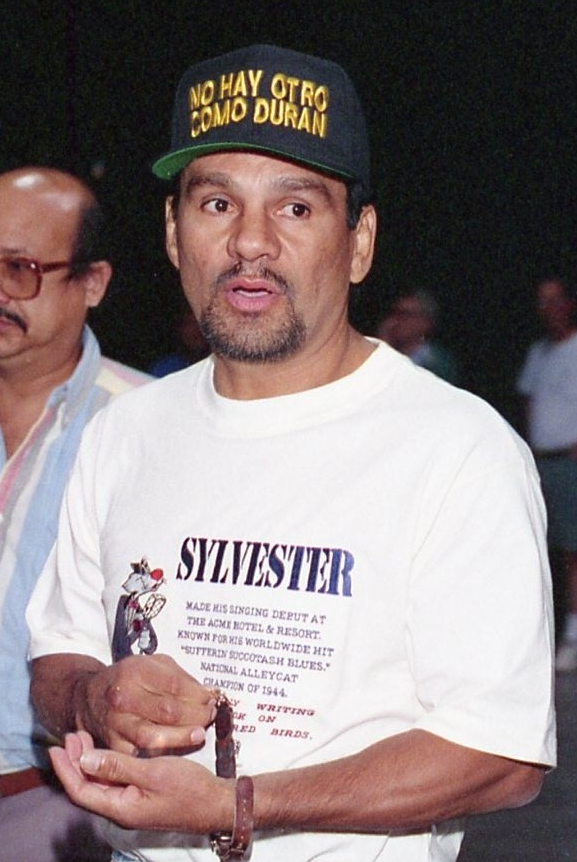
Four-weight world boxing champion Roberto Durán

In a 2024 survey, 48% of Panamanians said baseball was their favorite sport, 30% said football (soccer), 4% boxing, chess and tennis.

Baseball is the most popular sport in Panama. The Panamanian Professional Baseball League is the country's professional winter league. It was first held in 1946, but had multiple interruptions spanning several decades. The Panama national baseball team has earned one silver medal and two bronze medals at the Baseball World Cup. At least 140 Panamanian players have played professional baseball in the United States, more than any other Central American country.

Football is the second most popular sport in Panama. The top tier of domestic Panamanian football, Liga Panameña de Fútbol, was founded in 1988. The men's national team appeared at the FIFA World Cup for the first time in 2018, appearing in group G, facing Belgium, England and Tunisia. However, the team lost all three games, failing to advance past the group stage.

Club competition is played in the Liga de Fútbol Femenino. The women's national team debuted in the World Cup in 2023 as the final team to qualify. They joined Group F with Brazil, Jamaica, and France, where they finished last with three losses but scored three goals against France. Marta Cox scored Panama's first ever goal at a World Cup.

Basketball is also popular in Panama. There are regional teams as well as a squad that competes internationally.

Other popular sports include volleyball, taekwondo, golf, and tennis. A long-distance hiking trail called the TransPanama Trail from Colombia to Costa Rica was opened in 2009. Panama's women's national volleyball team competes in Central America's AFECAVOL (Asociación de Federaciones CentroAmericanas de Voleibol) zone.

Other non-traditional sports in the country have had great importance such as the triathlon that has captured the attention of many athletes nationwide and the country has hosted international competitions. Flag football has also been growing in popularity in both men and women and with international participation in world of this discipline being among the best teams in the world, the sport was introduced by Americans residing in the Canal Zone for veterans and retirees who even had a festival called the Turkey Ball. Other popular sports are American football, rugby, field hockey, softball, and other amateur sports, including skateboarding, BMX, and surfing, because the many beaches of Panama such as Santa Catalina and Venao that have hosted events the likes of ISA World Surfing Games.

Professional boxers from Panama to be inducted in the International Boxing Hall of Fame include the first Latin American to be a world boxing champion, Panama Al Brown, as well as Ismael Laguna, Roberto Duran, Eusebio Pedroza and Hilario Zapata.

== See also ==
- Outline of Panama
