= Telephone numbers in Panama =

- Location of Panama (dark green)
- Country: Panama
- Continent: North America
- Regulator: Autoridad Nacional de los Servicios Públicos (ASEP)
- Numbering plan type: Open
- NSN length: 7, 8 (Note: Seven digits for landlines and eight digits for mobiles.)
- Format: xxx-xxxx (Note: Landline numbers); 6xxx-xxxx (Note: Mobile numbers)
- Numbering plan: Panama National Numbering Plans
- Last updated: 24 April 2008
- Country code: +507
- International access: 00

All telephone numbers in Panama are seven or eight digits long (xxx-xxxx or 6xxx-xxxx) and there are no area codes. All numbers that both begin with 6 and have 8 digits are mobile numbers. All landline numbers have 7 digits. The first digit of landline numbers may be used to vaguely identify the location of the caller. Mobile phones were also assigned 7 digit numbers until 2005, when they were moved to their own number space with 8 digits. Mobile numbers are recycled if the user is marked as inactive by the mobile service provider, and landline numbers are also recycled if a user cancels their landline phone service.

== Land lines ==
The following table lists the first digit for locations of land-lines:

Location	Prefix
Emergency services, Municipal services, Overseas calling, Phone services	1
Panama City	2 or 3
Panamá Oeste	2 or 3
Colón	4
Government agencies, offices and public schools	5
Mobile phones (Prior to August 2005)	6
Bocas del Toro	7
Chiriquí	7
Toll-free	8
Coclé	9
Herrera	9
Los Santos	9
Veraguas	9

== Mobile phones ==
6xxx xxxx

== Emergency and assistance numbers ==
The following three-digit numbers are also in use:

Service	Number
Directory assistance	102
Ambulance	103
Fire	103
Police	104
Emergencies	911

== See also ==
- Telecommunications in Panama
