= Archaeology of Bocas del Toro =

Archaeology of Bocas del Toro, Panama: The province of Bocas del Toro in Panama has a rich history, beginning with the first European visitors: Christopher Columbus and his son Fernando in 1502 on Columbus’ fourth voyage to the New World. The area was visited frequently from the middle of the 17th century to the middle of the 18th century by privateers and buccaneers marauding Spanish colonial towns and the ships carrying gold to Europe. However little is known of the inhabitants of the region before the time of European contact. Archaeological research conducted since the middle of the 20th century has begun to illuminate the cultural history as well as development of societies in the region prior to Columbus arriving.

== Geographic setting ==
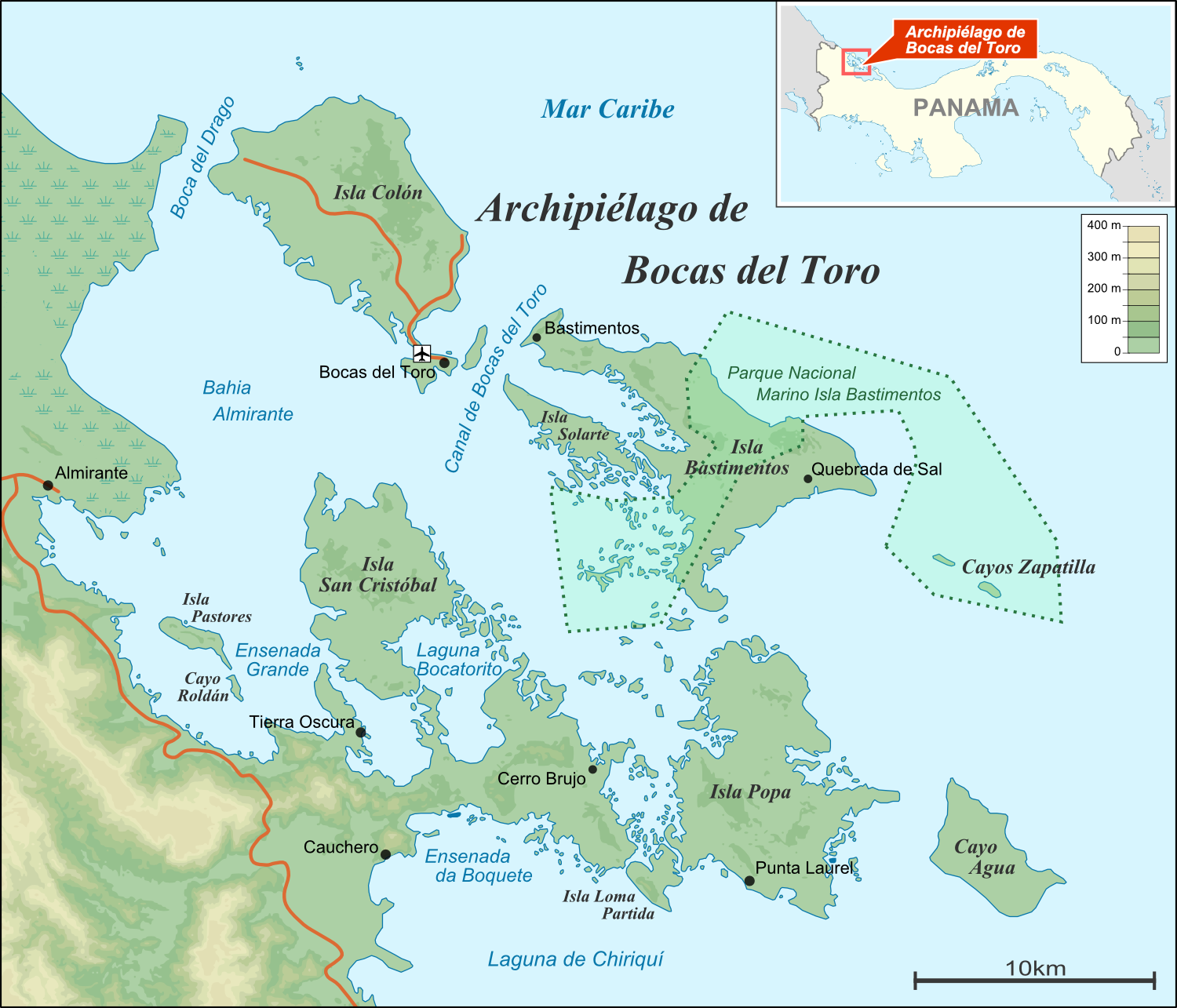
Bocas del Toro Archipelago

Bocas del Toro is one of ten provinces in the Republic of Panama, and is located in the western part of the country. It is bounded by the province of Chiriquí in the south, the province of Veraguas (including the Ngöbe-Buglé Comarca Comarca indígena) in the east, to the north is the Caribbean Sea and to the west is the Republic of Costa Rica. Bocas del Toro also refers to the archipelago which runs roughly northwest to southeast along the coast of the isthmus from the Seropta Peninsula to the Laguna de Chiriquí and includes the islands of Isla Colón, Isla Solarte, Isla Bastimentos, Isla San Cristóbal, Isla Popa, and Cayo Agua. The province is further divided into three districts: Chiriquí Grande, Changuinola, and Bocas del Toro. Major cities include Changuinola, Almirante, and Bocas del Toro or (Bocas Town) which is also the provincial capital and is located on Isla Colon.

The nine provinces and three provincial-level comarcas of Panama

== Early research ==
The earliest archaeological research in the region was conducted by Mathew Stirling in 1953 and revealed the existence of shell middens along the coastal plain although very little was published about these. The geographer B.L. Gordon provided a more discerning interpretation of these middens and “began to develop a bio-cultural profile of the area”. Gordon’s excavations yielded mostly mollusk remains, although he described an unknown number of metates and a low density of both ceramic sherds and stone tools in the form of triangular celts. From 1971 through 1972 Olga Linares conducted test excavations at the Cerro Brujo shell midden site on the Aguacate Peninsula. This site is located on top of a ridgeline that divides Bahía Almirante from Laguna de Chiriquí, and is 3 km from the shoreline at approximately 140 m above sea level. She describes the site as a hamlet in which cultural material recovered from “two main midden clusters” show an occupation period of 20–30 years from five radiocarbon dates ranging from AD 960 to AD 985. A complete survey of the Aguacate Peninsula was conducted by Linares in 1973 and in addition to Cerro Brujo three similar shell midden sites were located.

== Recent research ==
The most recent site to be discovered and studied in the province is Sitio Drago on the northwest shore of Isla Colon, and has been investigated by Thomas A. Wake of the Cotsen Institute of Archaeology at UCLA from 2002 to the present. This site is located on a “stabilized beach ridge” between the tropical forest of the interior of the island and the coral reef immediately offshore. The site is identified by approximately 15 low mounds of stratified midden over 17 hectares. Test excavations have produced “prestige goods, as well as a wider variety of general artefact types, and a greater diversity of ceramics than seen at Cerro Brujo”. Cultural material recovered include a wide variety of ceramic sherds and appliqué figurines which indicate interaction with the Pacific Chiriquí region, various stone tools (celts, blades), and a diverse collection of faunal remains (bone and mollusk). Radiocarbon dates from carbonized wood and Raphia nuts provide a timeframe of AD 900 to AD 1150 for the occupation period of the site. The diversity and density of the ceramics and other goods recovered from Sitio Drago have led Wake to surmise that “Sitio Drago is much larger and appears more internally complex than the loosely organized farming hamlets such as Cerro Brujo,”.

== Interpretations ==
Following Gordon, Linares surmised that the Bocas del Toro region was a marginal area to the supposedly larger and more complex culture area of Chiriquí on the Pacific coast of the isthmus of Panama. The paucity of sites, which appeared solely to be small hamlets identified by shell middens with a low density of stone artifacts, seemed to indicate a very low population spread out over a large area. The Bocas del Toro archipelago of islands was dismissed as having no significant importance, particularly because of Gordon’s assumption that the only sites off the mainland were similar small hamlets with shell middens, as reported to him (it is not mentioned who provided this information) on Isla Popa and Isla Cristóbal. Since the discovery and excavations at Sitio Drago, the Bocas del Toro region has been cast in a new light archaeologically. Wake argues that the assumptions made by Linares are empirically weak as they are based on a single excavated site and nominal investigation of the surrounding region. Diagnostic ceramics from Sitio Drago identified as Linarte Zoned Red Line ware and others “support the idea of trans-isthmian connections”. Additionally, the greater diversity and density of stone tools, faunal remains, and prestige items at a site contemporaneous with Cerro Brujo lend to the hypothesis that the region was more complex socio-politically than previously assumed and that it was an integral part of the “Greater Chiriquí interaction sphere”.

== Current investigations ==
At this time Sitio Drago is still being investigated by Wake with colleagues Tomas Mendizabal and Alexis Mojica as the Proyecto Arqueológico Sitio Drago (PASD). In addition to publications forthcoming from Wake, Mendizabal, and Mojica, several new investigations are being conducted by students in coordination with PASD both at the site and in other parts of Isla Colón.
