= List of Caribbean islands by area =

This is a list of islands in the Greater Caribbean by area. (The Bahamas, the Turks and Caicos Islands, and Barbados are not strictly in the Caribbean Sea, but rather in the open North Atlantic Ocean and associated with the Greater Caribbean region.) For related lists, see below.

== Islands ==
=== Islands 1,000 km^{2} (390 sq mi) and greater ===
Rank	Island Name	Area (km^{2})	Area (sq mi)	Population	Country and territory
1	Cuba	105,806	40,852	11,318,747 (2022)	Cuba
2	Hispaniola	76,479	29,529	22,278,000 (2020)	Haiti and Dominican Republic
3	Jamaica	10,990	4,240	2,734,092 (2015)	Jamaica
4	Puerto Rico	8,868	3,424	3,203,295 (2024)	Puerto Rico (U.S.)
5	Trinidad	4,827	1,864	1,487,245 (2024)	Trinidad and Tobago
6	North Andros Island	3,439	1,328	4,731 (2022)	Bahamas
7	Isla de la Juventud	2,237	864	83,583 (2022)	Cuba
8	Great Inagua Island	1,543	596	856 (2022)	Bahamas
9	South Andros Island	1,447	559	4,603 (2022)	Bahamas
10	Grand Bahama Island	1,373	530	47,475 (2022)	Bahamas
11	Great Abaco Island	1,144	442	16,587 (2022)	Bahamas
12	Martinique	1,128	436	349,925 (2022)	Martinique
13	Isla Margarita	1,020	394	489,917 (2022)	Venezuela (Nueva Esparta)

=== Islands 300–999 km^{2} (116–386 sq mi) ===
Rank	Island	Area (km^{2})	Area (sq mi)	Country or Countries
14	Basse-Terre	848	327	Guadeloupe
15	Cayo Romano	777	300	Cuba
16	Dominica	750	290	Dominica
17	Gonâve	743	287	Haiti
18	Cozumel	647	250	Mexico (Quintana Roo)
19	Saint Lucia	616	238	Saint Lucia
20	Grande-Terre	587	226	Guadeloupe
21	Little Abaco Island	559	216	Bahamas
22	Eleuthera	518	200	Bahamas
23	Acklins Island	497	192	Bahamas
24	Long Island	448	173	Bahamas
25	Curaçao	444	171	Curaçao
26	Barbados	431	167	Barbados
27	Cat Island	389	150	Bahamas
28	Cayo Coco	370	143	Cuba
29	Saint Vincent	345	133	Saint Vincent and the Grenadines
30	Cayo Sabinal	335	129	Cuba
31	Grenada	310	120	Grenada
32	Tobago	300	116	Trinidad and Tobago

=== Islands 100–299 km^{2} (39–115 sq mi) ===
Rank	Island	Area (km^{2})	Area (sq mi)	Country or Countries
33	Bonaire	294	113	Bonaire
34	Mayaguana	280	110	Bahamas
35	Antigua	279	108	Antigua and Barbuda
36	Saint Croix	214	82	United States Virgin Islands
37	New Providence	207	80	Bahamas
38	Grand Cayman	196	76	Cayman Islands
39	Aruba	180	74	Aruba
40	Tortuga	178	69	Haiti
41	Saint Kitts	168	65	Saint Kitts and Nevis
42	San Salvador Island	163	63	Bahamas
43	Barbuda	161	61	Antigua and Barbuda ( Barbuda)
44	Marie Galante	158	61	Guadeloupe
45	Great Exuma	158	61	Bahamas
46	La Tortuga Island	156.6	61	Venezuela (Federal Dependencies of Venezuela)
47	Crooked Island	148	57	Bahamas
48	Middle Caicos	144.2	56	Turks and Caicos Islands
49	Vieques	135	52	Puerto Rico
50	Little Inagua	127	49	Bahamas
51	Roatan	125	48	Honduras
52	North Caicos	116.4	45	Turks and Caicos Islands
53	Saona Island	110	42	Dominican Republic
54	Cayo Guajaba	107	41	Cuba
55	Montserrat	102	39	Montserrat
56	Cayo Fragoso	101	39	Cuba

=== Islands 30–99 km^{2} (12–38 sq mi) ===
Rank	Island	Area (km^{2})	Area (sq mi)	Country or Countries
57	Providenciales	98	38	Turks and Caicos Islands
58	Nevis	93	36	Saint Kitts and Nevis (Nevis)
59	Anguilla	91	35	Anguilla
60	East Caicos	90.6	34	Turks and Caicos Islands
61	Saint Martin	87	34	Saint Martin and Sint Maarten
62	Saint Thomas	80.91	31.23	United States Virgin Islands
63	Rum Cay	78	30	Bahamas
64	Ambergris Caye	65	25	Belize
65	Blanquilla Island	64	25	Venezuela (Federal Dependencies of Venezuela)
66	Colón Island	61	24	Panama (Bocas del Toro)
67	Isla Mona	57	22	Puerto Rico
68	Coche Island	55	21	Venezuela (Nueva Esparta)
69	Tortola	55.7	21.5	British Virgin Islands
70	Popa Island	53	20.5	Panama (Bocas del Toro)
71	Bastimentos Island	52	20	Panama (Bocas del Toro)
72	Île à Vache	52	20	Haiti
73	Saint John	51	19.6	United States Virgin Islands
74	Guanaja	50	19	Honduras
75	Útila	49	18.9	Honduras
76	Grande Cayemite	45	17	Haiti
77	Samana Cay	45	17	Bahamas
78	Cayo Saetia	42	16.2	Cuba
79	La Orchila	40	15.4	Venezuela (Federal Dependencies of Venezuela)
80	Anegada	38	15	British Virgin Islands
81	Cayo Largo del Sur	37.5	14.5	Cuba
82	Cristóbal Island	37	14.3	Panama (Bocas del Toro)
83	Cayman Brac	36	14	Cayman Islands
84	Carriacou	34	13	Grenada
85	Great Harbour Cay	32	12.3	Bahamas
86	Culebra	30.1	11.6	Puerto Rico

=== Islands 10–29 km^{2} (3.9–11.2 sq mi) ===
Rank	Island	Area (km^{2})	Area (sq mi)	Country or Countries
86	Little Exuma	29	11	Bahamas
87	West Caicos	28	11	Turks and Caicos Islands
88	Beata Island	27	10	Dominican Republic
89	San Andrés	26	10	Colombia (San Andrés y Providencia)
90	Little Cayman	26	10	Cayman Islands
91	Cayo Cruz	26	10	Cuba
92	Big Pine Key	25.8	10	United States (Florida)
93	Cubagua	24	-	Venezuela (Nueva Esparta)
94	Ragged Island	23	9	Bahamas
95	South Caicos	21.2	8	Turks and Caicos Islands
96	Saint Barthélemy	21	8	Saint Barthélemy
97	Sint Eustatius	21	8.1	Sint Eustatius
98	Virgin Gorda	21	8	British Virgin Islands
99	Long Cay	21	8	Bahamas
100	La Désirade	20.64	-	Guadeloupe
101	Tierra Bomba Island	19.8	-	Colombia
102	Bequia	18.1	7	Saint Vincent and the Grenadines
103	Grand Turk Island	17.39	6.71	Turks and Caicos Islands
104	Providencia	17	-	Colombia
105	Cayo Agua Island	16	-	Panama
106	Cayo Grande	15.1	5.8	Venezuela
107	Key West	13.65	5.27	United States (Florida)
108	Cayo Guillermo	13	-	Cuba
109	Saba	13	5	Caribbean Netherlands
110	Canouan	13	5	Saint Vincent and the Grenadines
111	Big Corn Island	10	-	Nicaragua

=== Islands 5–9 km^{2} (1.9–3.5 sq mi) ===
Rank	Island	Area (km^{2})	Area (sq mi)	Country or Countries
112	Little San Salvador Island	9.7	-	Bahamas
113	Catalina Island	9.6	-	Dominican Republic
114	Terre-de-Bas	9	-	Guadeloupe
115	Conception Island	8.5	3	Bahamas
116	Ronde Island	8.1	-	Grenada
117	Jost Van Dyke	8	3	British Virgin Islands
118	Union Island	8	3	Saint Vincent and the Grenadines
119	Solarte Island	8	3	Panama
120	Isleta de San Juan	7.8	3	Puerto Rico
121	Salt Cay	6.74	2.60	Turks and Caicos Islands
122	Klein Bonaire	6	2.3	Caribbean Netherlands
123	Mustique	5.7	2.2	Saint Vincent and the Grenadines
124	Navassa Island	5.2	2	United States (Claimed by Haiti)
125	Terre-de-Haut	5.2	-	Guadeloupe
126	Isla Mujeres	5.2	2	Mexico

== See also ==
- List of Caribbean islands (by political affiliation)
- List of Caribbean countries by population
- List of metropolitan areas in the Caribbean
- List of West Indian first-level country subdivisions
