= Ana K. Spalding =

Afro-Panamanian marine biologist

Ana K. Spalding is an Afro-Panamanian environmental researcher who works at both the Smithsonian Tropical Research Institute and Oregon State University. Her work focuses on environmental policy questions related to human impact on marine habitats, and its social implications for coastal communities.

== Early life and education ==
Ana K. Spalding grew up in Panama. Due to her father’s work as an engineer and her mother's work in conservation, she was encouraged by both to pursue environmental work. In 1999, she received her Bachelor’s degree in International Economics from the University of Richmond and a Masters degree in Marine Affairs and Policy from the University of Miami in 2004. In 2011, she received a PhD in Environmental Studies from the University of California, Santa Cruz.

== Career ==
After receiving her PhD, Spalding worked as a postdoctoral fellow for two years at the Smithsonian Tropical Research Institute in Panama. In 2015 she became a Research Associate at the Smithsonian Tropical Research Institute in Panama and an assistant professor at the School of Public Policy at Oregon State University.

She is a part of the Pacific Marine Energy Center (PMEC), a collaboration between research institutes in the pacific northwest to study wave and tidal energy. In 2021, Ana Spalding conducted a NOAA-funded project on the impact of climate change and relevant acidification regulations on west coast states with a focus on the economic impacts in coastal communities producing shellfish. In 2024, as a part of National Geographic’s project, “The Many Faces of Conservation: Impacts and meaning of Bastimentos Island National Marine Park on the Ngäbe in Panama”, Spalding travelled to Popa Island off the coast of Panama. She met with Panama’s largest indigenous tribe, the Ngäbe Tribe, to develop a better understanding of how policy decisions impact their livelihood.

In 2020, Spalding was provided a $150,000 grant by Ocean Nexus to use over two years. The project aims to train Ycaza in leadership and development of critical science communication.

== Legacy and impact ==
Spalding founded the Adrienne Arsht Community-Based Resilience Solutions Initiative, which researches in resilience of both the environment and the surrounding communities to climate change, with the ultimate goal of globally easing stress and conflict stemming from climate change.

Additionally, Spalding is a part of the Smithsonian Tropical Research Institute (STRI), being the first marine researcher to join out of a total of 40 scientists on staff. The STRI manages several educational outreach programs, and collaborates with policy makers to influence policies and legislation related to climate change.

In 2021, Spalding and 23 other women scientists published an article in PLOS Biology calling for a change to create a more equitable, diverse and inclusive academic culture, after Nature Communications published an article stating it's better for women in science to be mentored by men than women. Spalding and the paper's authors promote a "multidimensional" mode of understanding the mentor–protégé relationship, stressing that narrow, citation-oriented views of scientific impact disadvantage marginalized groups.

In their 2024 research article, Spalding, along with 3 other authors, examined how participatory science methods, which are commonly used in Marine Protected Area (MPA) engagement, do not challenge pre-existing power dynamics that are fundamental to top-down governance embedded in colonialism. The authors found that MPA practitioners should emphasize power-sharing, active collaboration and partnership to achieve more equitable outcomes.

== Publications ==
- Singh, G.G., Frenkel, C., Pheasey, H. et al. Area based conservation tools have mixed effects across all SDGs but research may overstate effects. Commun Earth Environ 7, 34 (2026). https://doi.org/10.1038/s43247-025-03040-3
- Spalding, Ana & Grorud-Colvert, Kirsten & Allison, Edward & Amon, Diva & Collin, Rachel & De Vos, Asha & Friedlander, Alan & Johnson, Steven & Mayorga, Juan & Paris, Claire & Scott, Cinda & Suman, Daniel & Cisneros-Montemayor, Andrés & Estradivari, & Giron Nava, Jose & Gurney, Georgina & Harris, J. & Hicks, Christina & Mangubhai, Sangeeta & Thurber, Rebecca. (2023). Engaging the tropical majority to make ocean governance and science more equitable and effective. npj Ocean Sustainability. 2. 10.1038/s44183-023-00015-9.
- Zuercher, Rachel & Ban, Natalie & Flannery, Wesley & Guerry, Anne & Halpern, Benjamin & Magris, Rafael Almeida & Mahajan, Shauna & Motzer, Nicole & Spalding, Ana & Stelzenmüller, Vanessa & Kramer, Jonathan. (2022). Enabling conditions for effective marine spatial planning. Marine Policy. 143. 105141. 10.1016/j.marpol.2022.105141.
- Crosman, Katherine & Allison, Edward & Ota, Yoshitaka & Cisneros-Montemayor, Andrés & Singh, Gerald & Swartz, Wilf & Bailey, Megan & Barclay, Kate & Blume, Grant & Colléter, Mathieu & Fabinyi, Michael & Faustman, Elaine & Fielding, Russell & Griffin, P. & Hanich, Quentin & Harden-Davies, Harriet & Kelly, Ryan & Kenny, Tiff-Annie & Klinger, Terrie & Spalding, Ana. (2022). Social equity is key to sustainable ocean governance. npj Ocean Sustainability. 1. 4. 10.1038/s44183-022-00001-7.
- Grorud-Colvert, Kirsten & Sullivan-Stack, Jenna & Roberts, Callum & Constant, Vanessa & Horta e Costa, Barbara & Pike, Elizabeth & Kingston, Naomi & Laffoley, Dan & Sala, Enric & Claudet, Joachim & Friedlander, Alan & Gill, David & Lester, Sarah & Day, Jon & Gonçalves, Emanuel & Ahmadia, Gabby & Rand, Matt & Villagomez, Angelo & Ban, Natalie & Lubchenco, Jane. (2021). The MPA Guide: A framework to achieve global goals for the ocean. Science. 373. 10.1126/science.abf0861.
- Bennett, Nathan & Katz, Laure & Yadao-Evans, Whitney & Ahmadia, Gabby & Atkinson, Scott & Ban, Natalie & Dawson, Neil & De Vos, Asha & Fitzpatrick, Juno & Gill, David & Imirizaldu, Mael & Lewis, Naia & Mangubhai, Sangeeta & Meth, Leah & Muhl, Ella-Kari & Obura, David & Spalding, Ana & Villagomez, Angelo & Wagner, Daniel & Wilhelm, T.. (2021). Advancing Social Equity in and Through Marine Conservation. Frontiers in Marine Science. 8. 10.3389/fmars.2021.711538.
- Davies, Sarah & Putnam, Hollie & Ainsworth, Tracy & Baum, Julia & Bove, Colleen & Crosby, Sarah & Côté, Isabelle & Duplouy, Anne & Fulweiler, Wally & Griffin, Alyssa & Hanley, Torrance & Hill, Tessa & Humanes, Adriana & Mangubhai, Sangeeta & Metaxas, Anna & Parker, Laura & Rivera, Hanny & Silbiger, Nyssa & Smith, Nicola & Bates, Amanda. (2021). Promoting inclusive metrics of success and impact to dismantle a discriminatory reward system in science. PLOS Biology. 19. e3001282. 10.1371/journal.pbio.3001282.
