= Taboga =

Taboga may refer to:

- Taboga District, Panama
- Taboga Island, Gulf of Panama
- Taboga, Panama
- Taboga (moth), a snout moth genus in subfamily Pyralinae
- Taboga (sponge), a synonym for Tethya, a genus of sea sponges
