= Cayos Zapatilla =

Two islands in Panama

- Location within Central America

Geography
- Coordinates: 9°15′N 82°2′W
- Archipelago: Bocas del Toro Archipelago
- Total islands: 2
- Major islands: Cayo Zapatilla Mayor
- Area: 14 & 34 ha.
- Highest elevation: 0 m (0 ft)

Administration
- Panama
- Province: Bocas del Toro
- District: Bocas del Toro

Cayos Zapatilla (Zapatilla Cayes) is a group of two uninhabited islands located east of Isla Bastimentos in the Bocas del Toro Archipelago of Bocas del Toro Province, Panama. North Cayo Zapatilla is 14 hectares long while south Cayo Zapatilla is comparatively bigger with 34 hectares. Both islands lie within the boundaries of the Isla Bastimentos National Marine Park.

== See also ==
- List of islands of Panama
- List of islands
- Desert island
