= Carenero Island =

Island in Panama

Native name: Isla Carenero
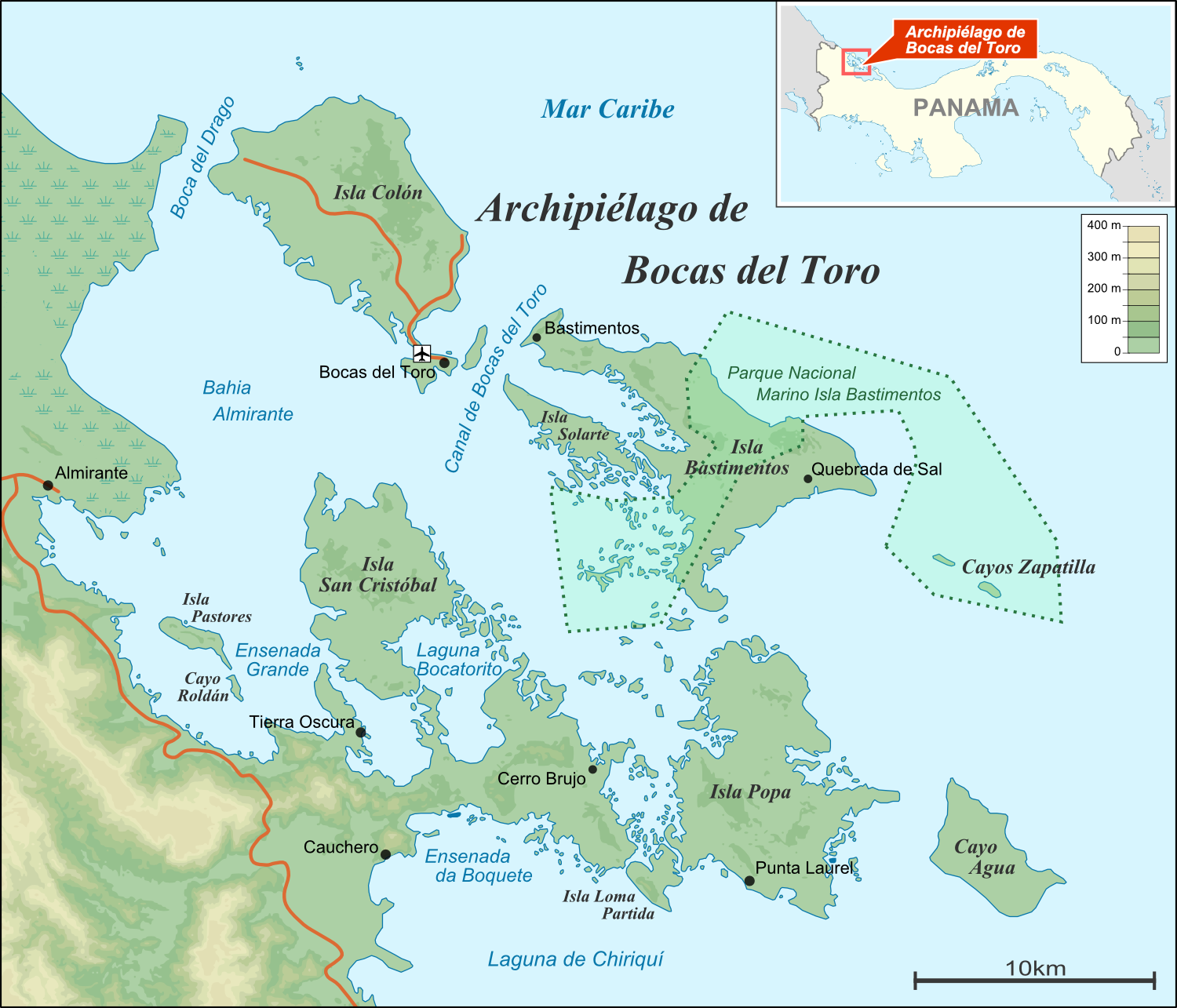
- Bocas del Toro Archipelago

Geography
- Coordinates: 9°21′N 82°14′W
- Archipelago: Bocas del Toro Archipelago
- Area: 0.94 km^{2} (0.36 sq mi)
- Highest elevation: 0 m (0 ft)

Administration
- Panama
- Province: Bocas del Toro
- District: Bocas del Toro
- Corregimiento: Bocas del Toro

Demographics
- Population: 737 (2000)

Carenero Island, 2013

Carenero Island (in Spanish: Isla Carenero) is a long and forested island located just a few hundred meters east of Isla Colón, in the Bocas del Toro Archipelago, Panama. The name of the island comes from the nautical term careening, which means to lean a ship on its side for repairing or scraping its hull. There are no roads on the island.

== See also ==
- List of islands of Panama
