= Solarte =

Solarte may refer to:

- Juan José Narváez Solarte (born 1995), Colombian footballer
- Víctor Solarte (born 1986), Venezuelan track and field hurdler
- Yangervis Solarte (born 1987), Venezuelan baseball player in Major League Baseball
- Solarte Island, an island off the eastern coast of Panama
