= Otoque Island =

Island in Panama

Isla de Otoque
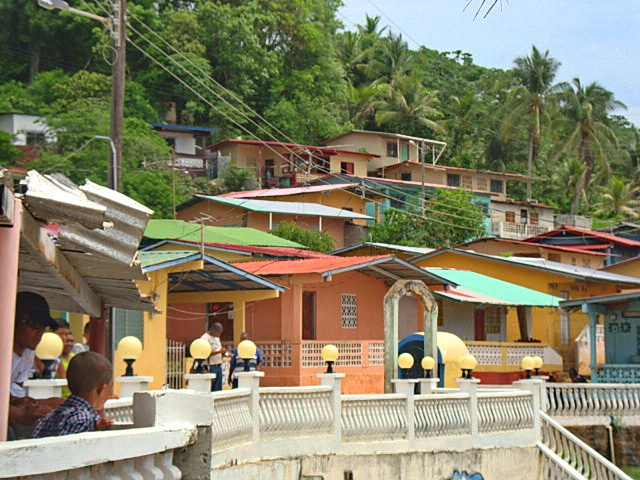
- A settlement on Otoque Island

- Location within Panama

Geography
- Coordinates: 8°36′N 79°36′W
- Area: 2.66 km^{2} (1.03 sq mi)

Administration
- Panama
- Province: Panamá
- District: Taboga

Demographics
- Population: 130 (2000)

Otoque is an island located in the Gulf of Panama, within the Taboga District. It has an area of 2.66 km^{2}. At the time of the 2000 census, the population was 130. The island was originally inhabited by indigenous groups led by the chiefs Careta, Tatalao, and Estivá, who fought against the Spanish conquerors. There are two towns, located at opposite sides of the island. These form the corregimientos of Otoque Oriente and Otoque West. The island's economy is based on fishing and subsistence agriculture.
