= Chiriquí Lagoon =

Lagoon on the northwest coast of Panama

- Laguna de Chiriquí (Spanish)
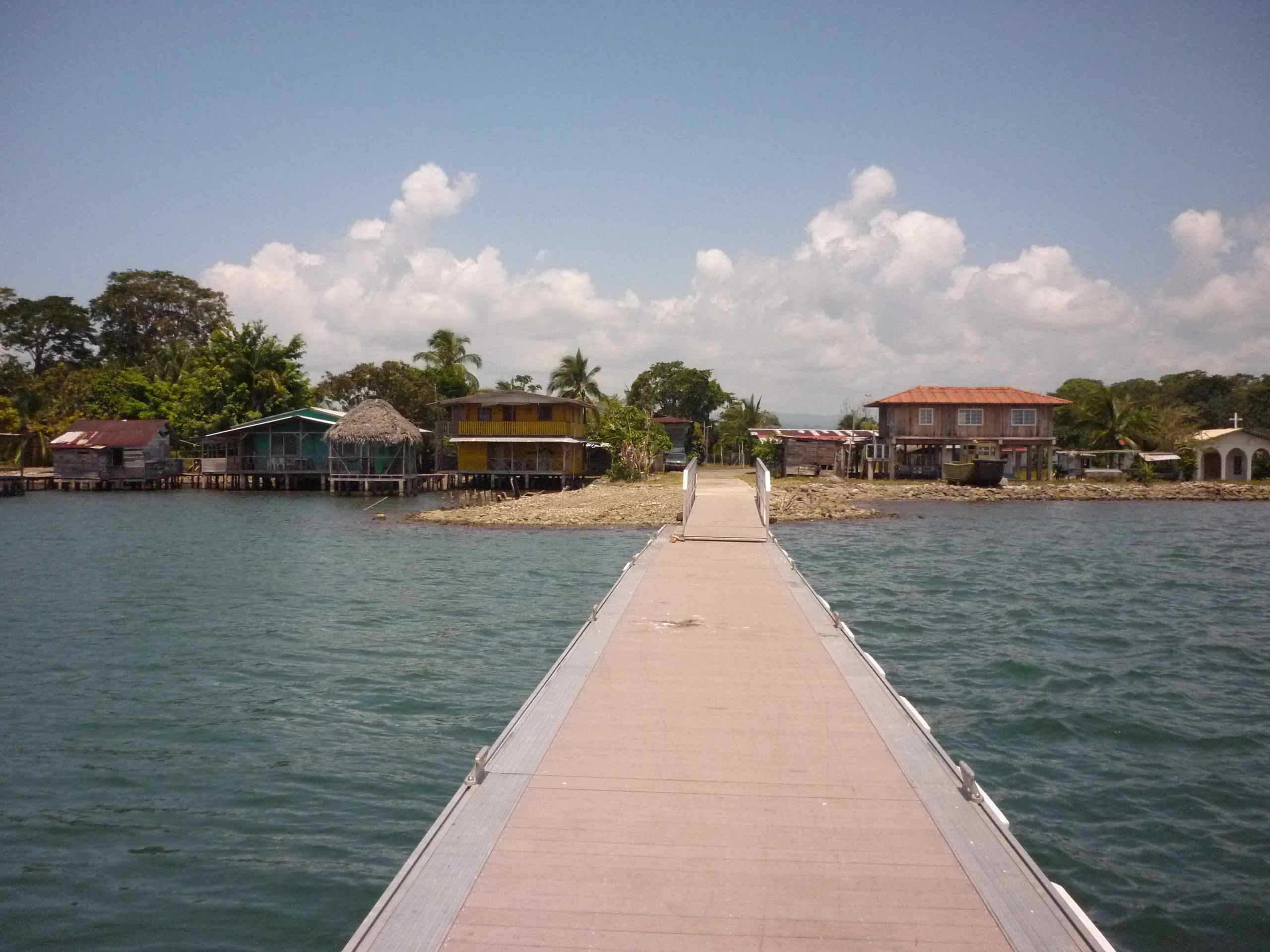
- Punta Robalo, a town on the western coast of Chiriquí Lagoon

- Location within Panama
- Location: northwest Panama
- Coordinates: 9°N 82°W
- Primary inflows: Guariviara River, Cricamola River
- Primary outflows: Caribbean Sea, Almirante Bay
- Basin countries: Panama
- Surface area: 900 km^{2} (350 sq mi)
- Settlements: Chiriquí Grande, Punta Robalo, Cauchero

Chiriquí Lagoon is a large lagoon on the northwest coast of Panama covering an area of about 900 square kilometres (350 sq mi). It is separated from the Caribbean Sea by the Valiente Peninsula to the east and from Almirante Bay by islands in the Bocas del Toro Archipelago to the northwest, including Cayo Agua and Isla Popa. The widest and deepest entrance into the bay is the Canal del Tigre in the northeast, which is the main access channel for ships entering the lagoon.

The temperature of the water in the lagoon ranges from 26 to 28 °C. Salinity can be as low as 1.015 (SG) due to runoff from rivers, especially during the rainy season. The mean tidal range is 0.24 metres (9.4 in) with a maximum range of 0.64 metres (2 ft 1 in); tidal flow in the lagoon is weak.

Rivers that drain into Chiriquí Lagoon include the Guariviara River and Cricamola River, both of which flow through the wetlands on the southeast shore of the lagoon. These are protected as part of the Ramsar site of Damani-Guariviara, which covers 240.89 square kilometres (93.01 sq mi) of land between the lagoon and the Caribbean coast.

There are periods of low rainfall in March and September–October, and periods of high rainfall in July and December. The annual rainfall in the region is about 287 centimetres (113 in), being higher in the southeast part of the lagoon. February is the windiest month in the lagoon.

Native Americans guided Christopher Columbus into the lagoon in 1502 during his search for a connection to the Pacific Ocean. The Ngäbe continue to inhabit the southern and eastern coasts of the lagoon. The lagoon is administratively divided between Bocas del Toro Province in the west and Ngäbe-Buglé Comarca in the east.

Coal deposits were discovered in the area in the mid-19th century. The port of Chiriquí Grande is the northern terminus of the Trans-Panama pipeline. The terminal was the site of an oil spill on 4 February 2007 that leaked 5030 barrels of oil on to the surrounding land and water.
