= Tierra Oscura =

Town in Panama

- Corregimiento and town
- Location within Panama
- Coordinates: 9°11′N 82°17′W
- Country: Panama
- Province: Bocas del Toro
- District: Bocas del Toro
- Established: March 7, 1997

Area
  - Land: 88.6 km^{2} (34.2 sq mi)

Population (2010)
  - Total: 2,661
  - Density: 30/km^{2} (78/sq mi)
- Population density calculated based on land area.
- Time zone: UTC−5 (EST)
- Climate: Af

Tierra Oscura is a town and corregimiento in Bocas del Toro District, Bocas del Toro Province, Panama. It has a land area of 88.6 square kilometres (34.2 sq mi) and had a population of 2,661 as of 2010, giving it a population density of 30 inhabitants per square kilometre (78/sq mi). It was created by Law 10 of March 7, 1997; this measure was complemented by Law 5 of January 19, 1998 and Law 69 of October 28, 1998. Its population as of 2000 was 1,950.
