= Punta Robalo =

- Corregimiento and town
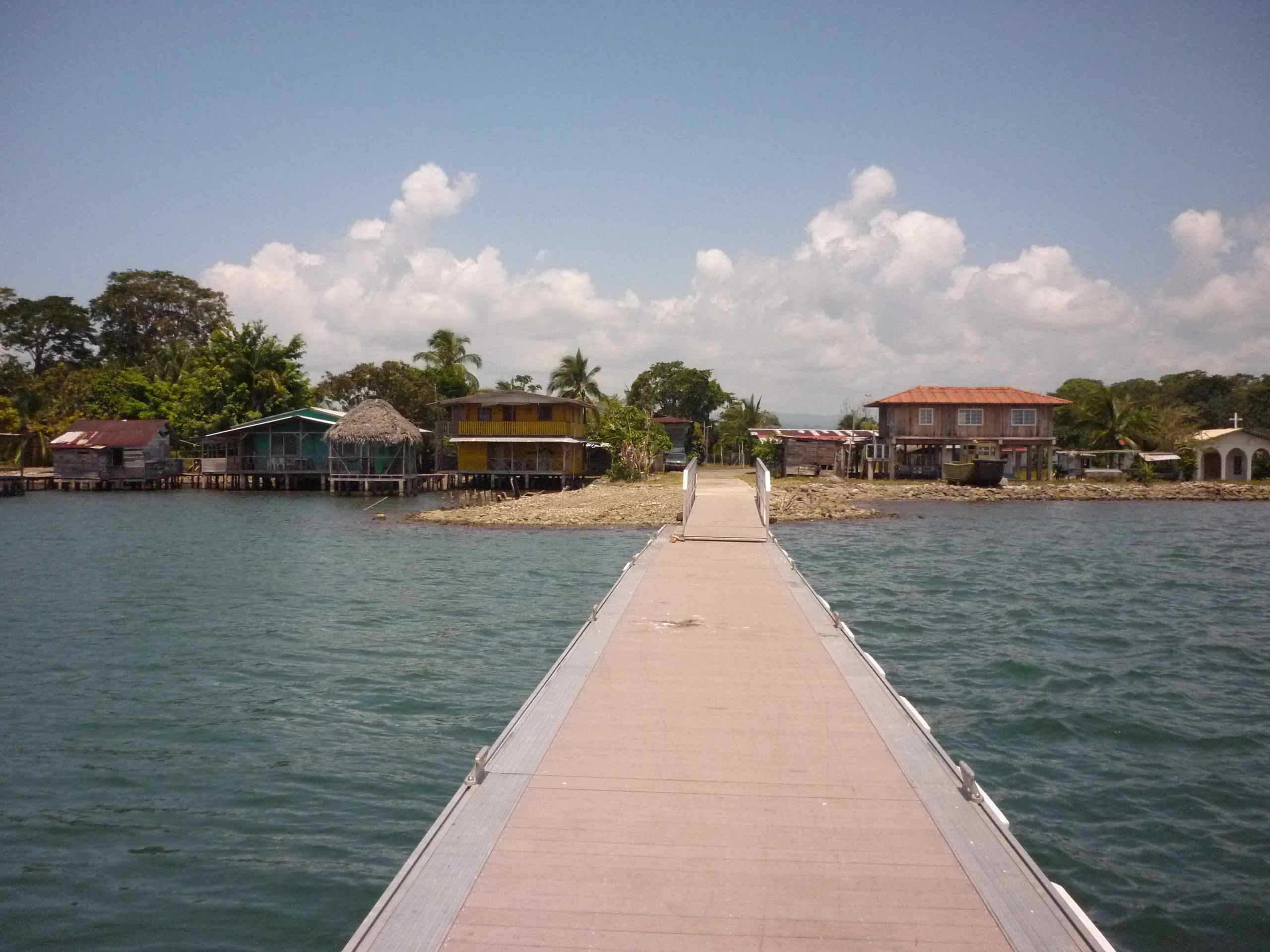
- Punta Robalo village

- Location within Panama
- Coordinates: 9°2′N 82°15′W
- Country: Panama
- Province: Bocas del Toro
- District: Chiriquí Grande

Area
  - Land: 51 km^{2} (20 sq mi)

Population (2010)
  - Total: 1,164
  - Density: 22.8/km^{2} (59/sq mi)
- Population density calculated based on land area.
- Time zone: UTC−5 (EST)

Punta Robalo is a town and corregimiento in Chiriquí Grande District, Bocas del Toro Province, Panama. The corregimiento has a land area of 51 square kilometres (20 sq mi) and had a population of 1,164 as of 2010, giving it a population density of 22.8 inhabitants per square kilometre (59/sq mi). Its population as of 1990 was 3,118; its population as of 2000 was 1,673. The town is located on the western coast of Chiriquí Lagoon.
