= Otoque Occidente =

Coordinates: 8.6000°N 79.6167°W

- Corregimiento
- Location within Panama
- Country: Panama
- Province: Panamá
- District: Taboga

Area
  - Land: 2 km^{2} (0.77 sq mi)

Population (2010)
  - Total: 262
  - Density: 130/km^{2} (340/sq mi)
- Population density calculated based on land area.
- Time zone: UTC−5 (EST)

Otoque Occidente is a district, or corregimiento, in Taboga District, Panamá Province, Panama with a population of 262 as of 2010. Its population as of 1990 was 401; its population as of 2000 was 295.
