= Guariviara River =

Coordinates: 8.94°N 81.97°W

- Location of mouth

Location
- Country: Panama

Basin features
- Map: Map

The Guariviara River is a river of Panama. It drains into the southeast shore of Chiriquí Lagoon.

"The Guariviara is a river that suffers catastrophic flooding; in its mouth, the river has built a powerful delta cone".

== See also ==
- List of rivers of Panama
