= List of islands of Panama =

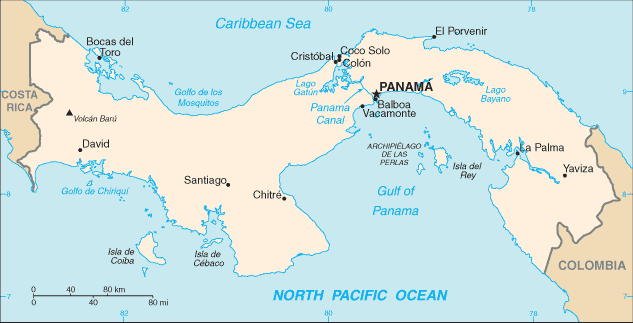
Map of Panama

This is a list of islands of Panama.

== Caribbean Sea ==
- Bocas del Toro Archipelago
  - Isla Bastimentos
  - Cayos Zapatilla
  - Isla Carenero
  - Isla Cayo Agua
  - Isla Colon
  - Isla Cristóbal
  - Isla Popa
  - Isla Solarte
- Isla Escudo de Veraguas
- Galeta Island
- Isla Cabra
- Isla Mamey
- Isla Grande
- San Blas Islands
  - Corazón de Jesús
  - Narganá
  - Soledad Miria

== Pacific Ocean ==
- Gulf of Chiriqui Islands
  - Isla Boca Brava
  - Isla Boca Chica
  - Isla Parida
  - Isla Palenque
  - Isla Sevilla
  - Islas Secas
- Cayo de Agua
- Isla Montuosa
- Jicarita
- Jicarón
- Coiba
- Cébaco
- Islas Frailes
- Isla Gobernadora
- Isla Leones
- Taborcillo
- Isla Verde
- Gulf of Panama Islands
  - Farallon (Cliff)
  - Isla Iguana - Pedasi - Azuero
  - Panama Bay Islands (Panama Bay is part of the Gulf of Panama)
    - Causeway Islands
    - Otoque
    - Taboga
    - Taboguilla
  - Archipelago Las Perlas (or Pearl Islands)
    - Isla Bolano
    - Isla Bayoneta
    - Isla de Boyarena
    - Isla Buena Vista
    - Isla Cañas
    - Isla Casaya
    - Isla Casayeta
    - Isla Chapera
    - Isla Chitre
    - Isla Cocos
    - Isla Contadora
    - Isla del Rey
    - Isla Espirito Santos
    - Isla Galera
    - Isla Gallo
    - Isla Gibraleon
    - Isla José
    - Isla la Mina
    - Isla Lampon
    - Isla Mogo Mogo
    - Isla Monte
    - Isla Pacheca
    - Isla Pachequille
    - Isla Pedro González
    - Isla Pericote
    - Isla Puerco
    - Isla Saboga
    - Isla San Blas
    - Isla San Jose
    - Isla Senora
    - Isla San Telmo
    - Isla Vivenda
    - Isla Viveros

== Lake Gatun ==
- Isla Barro Colorado
- Isla Gatun
- Isla Tres Perros

== See also ==
- Geography of Panama
