= Punta Laurel =

- Corregimiento and town
- Location within Panama
- Coordinates: 9°8′N 82°8′W
- Country: Panama
- Province: Bocas del Toro
- District: Bocas del Toro

Area
  - Land: 71.9 km^{2} (27.8 sq mi)

Population (2010)
  - Total: 1,730
  - Density: 24/km^{2} (62/sq mi)
- Population density calculated based on land area.
- Time zone: UTC-5 (ETZ)

Punta Laurel is a town and corregimiento in Bocas del Toro District, Bocas del Toro Province, Panama. It has a land area of 71.9 square kilometres (27.8 sq mi) and had a population of 1,730 as of 2010, giving it a population density of 24 inhabitants per square kilometre (62/sq mi). Its population as of 1990 was 692; its population as of 2000 was 966.
