= Cricamola River =

River in Panama

Coordinates: 8.98°N 81.92°W

Location
- Country: Panama

The Cricamola River is a river of Panama. It drains into the southeast shore of Chiriquí Lagoon.

== See also ==
- List of rivers of Panama
