= Bocas del Toro District =

Bocas del Toro
- District

- Location of the district capital in Panama
- Coordinates: 9°20′N 82°15′W
- Country: Panama
- Province: Bocas del Toro
- Capital: Bocas Town

Area
  - Total: 433.2 km^{2} (167.3 sq mi)

Population (2019)
  - Total: 21,396
  - Density: 49.39/km^{2} (127.9/sq mi)
- official estimate
- Time zone: UTC-5 (ETZ)

Bocas del Toro is a district (distrito) of Bocas del Toro Province in Panama. The population according to the 2012 census was 16,815; the latest official estimate (for 2019) is 21,396. The district covers a total area of 433.2 km^{2} (167.3 sq mi). The capital lies at the town of Bocas del Toro. Major industries include tourism and agriculture.

== Administrative divisions ==
Bocas del Toro District is divided administratively into the following corregimientos:

- Bocas del Toro
- Bastimentos
- Cauchero
- Punta Laurel
- Tierra Oscura

== Table of Islands ==
Nr	Island	Capital	Other Cities	Area (km²)	Population (Note: The Islands area and population data retrieved from the 2012 census)
1	Cauchero Mainland area	Cauchero	Tierra Oscura, Hope well, Secretaria, shark Hole,	185	3455
2	Bocas del Toro Archipelago	Bocas Town	Bastimentos, Punta Laurel, Isla Popa	248.2	12730
2.1	Bastimentos Island	Bastimentos town	Red Frog, Quebrada de Sal, Bahia Honda,	52	1663
2.2	Carenero Island	Caranero Town	Playa Buccaneer, Brown Point, Playa Acuario,	1	737
2.3	Cayo Agua Island	Puebla Limon	P. Piedra Roja, P. de Tiburon, P. de Nispero, P. Norte, Playa Resorte Agua	16	529
2.4	Cayo Coral	Cayo Coral		0.05	4
2.5	Cayo Mono	Cayo Mono		0.11	18
2.6	Cayos Zapatilla	Cayo Sur Station	Cayo Norte, Cobler Point,	0.48	2
2.7	Colon Island	Bocas Town	Big Creek, Boca Del Drago	61	6629
2.8	Cristobal Island	Botabite	Bocatorito, Big Bight, Redmans, Valle escondido,	37	1329
2.9	German Soldier cay	German Soldier cay		0.2	1
2.10	Isla de Bagui	Bagui Town		0.38	56
2.11	Isla Loma	Loma Partida	Punta Sumwood	3.56	225
2.12	Isla Pastores	Pastores Town	Playa starfish, Punta Fors, Punta Vergayo, Punta Maya	2.45	50
2.13	Jack Analy Cays	Jack Analy sur	Jack Analy norte	0.06	1
2.14	Popa Island	Popa Town	Punta Laurel, Punta Tigre	53	1201
2.15	Solarte Island	Solarte Town	Punta Hospital, Tucker Bight, Punta Juan Brown,	8	285
2.16	Other Islands	Cayo Rodlan		12	0
	Bocas del Toro District	Bocas Town	Bastimentos, Cauchero, Punta Laurel, Tierra Oscura,	433.2	16185

== Climate ==
Bocas del Toro is a coastal location with a tropical climate. The area does not have a predictable dry season. The driest times are late August to mid-October, February, and March. Bocas del Toro is humid. Thundershowers and heavy rain are common. Normal temperatures are consistent all year (Hi: 83-90, low: 71-75). Due to its low latitude, sunrise is around 6 AM, and sunset is around 6 PM local time. These times vary slightly during the year. Weather data is collected at Bocas del Toro "Isla Colón" International Airport:

Climate data for Bocas del Toro (1971-2000)
Month	Jan	Feb	Mar	Apr	May	Jun	Jul	Aug	Sep	Oct	Nov	Dec	Year
Mean daily maximum °C (°F)	30.8 (87.4)	30.7 (87.3)	31.0 (87.8)	31.4 (88.5)	31.9 (89.4)	32.0 (89.6)	31.5 (88.7)	31.8 (89.2)	31.9 (89.4)	31.7 (89.1)	31.6 (88.9)	31.0 (87.8)	31.4 (88.6)
Mean daily minimum °C (°F)	20.4 (68.7)	20.2 (68.4)	20.5 (68.9)	21.4 (70.5)	22.2 (72.0)	22.2 (72.0)	21.7 (71.1)	21.8 (71.2)	22.0 (71.6)	22.0 (71.6)	21.8 (71.2)	20.6 (69.1)	21.4 (70.5)
Average precipitation mm (inches)	123.9 (4.88)	266.1 (10.48)	83.8 (3.30)	369.1 (14.53)	178.3 (7.02)	259 (10.2)	420.1 (16.54)	440.7 (17.35)	311.2 (12.25)	150.5 (5.93)	291.7 (11.48)	563.6 (22.19)	3,458 (136.15)
Average precipitation days	16.6	14.6	14.8	15.2	16.7	17.9	20.9	18.4	15.8	16.4	17	20.0	204.3
Source: World Meteorological Organization

== Transportation ==
The district consists of the Bocas del Toro Archipelago and a coastal mainland area. Ferries, water taxis, and private boats provide transportation to many locations. Buses connect boat docks and mainland communities to adjacent districts and the rest of Panama. Bocas del Toro "Isla Colón" International Airport provides passenger and cargo flights to Panama and Costa Rica. Roads are usually dirt or gravel. Larger highways may be paved.

== Infrastructure ==
Bocas del Toro is a rural district. Schools and medical clinics operate around the district. Sanitation is limited. Water filtration and treatment facilities are non-existent in most communities. Sewage treatment is non-existent. The government is working on building more infrastructure in rural areas.

== See also ==
- List of islands of Panama
