= Otoque Oriente =

Coordinates: 8.6000°N 79.6000°W

- Corregimiento
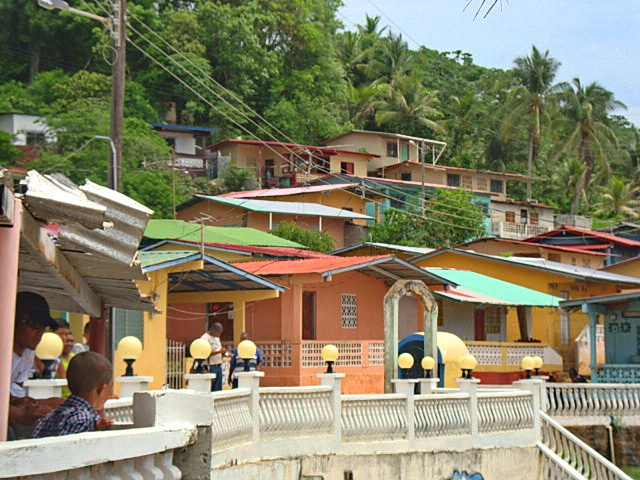
- Otoque Oriente

- Location within Panama
- Country: Panama
- Province: Panamá
- District: Taboga

Area
  - Land: 1.6 km^{2} (0.62 sq mi)

Population (2010)
  - Total: 126
  - Density: 80.2/km^{2} (208/sq mi)
- Population density calculated based on land area.
- Time zone: UTC−5 (EST)

Otoque Oriente is a corregimiento in Taboga District, Panamá Province, Panama with a population of 126 as of 2010. Its population as of 1990 was 210; its population as of 2000 was 199.
