= Bocas Town, Bocas del Toro =

Corregimiento and town in Panama

Bocas del Toro
- Corregimiento and town
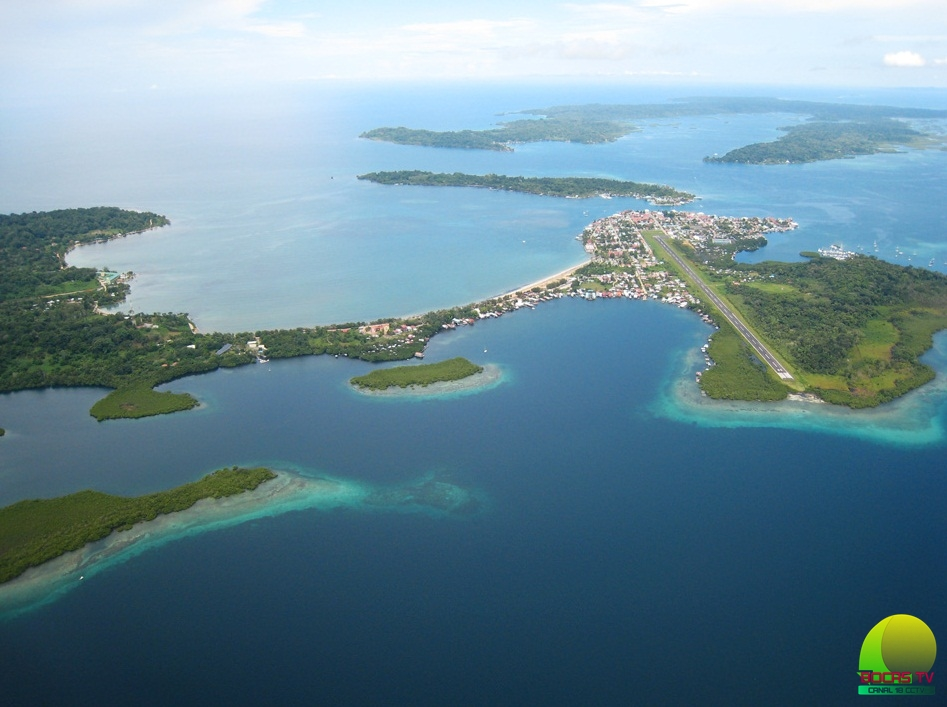
- City of Isla Colon
- Interactive map of Bocas del Toro
- Location within Panama
- Coordinates: 9°20′N 82°15′W
- Country: Panama
- Province: Bocas del Toro
- District: Bocas del Toro

Area
  - Land: 67.3 km^{2} (26.0 sq mi)
- Elevation: 10 m (33 ft)

Population (2010)
  - Total: 7,366
- Time zone: UTC-5 (Eastern Standard Time)
  - Summer (DST): UTC-5 (No DST)
- Climate: Af
- Website: bocas.municipios.gob.pa

Bocas del Toro (Spanish pronunciation: [ˈbokas ðel ˈtoɾo]), also known colloquially as Bocas Town, is the capital of the Panamanian province of Bocas del Toro and the district of Bocas del Toro. It is a town and a tourist resort located on the southern tip of Colón Island in the Bocas del Toro Archipelago in the Caribbean Sea. Bocas Town had 12,996 residents in 2008.

Bocas del Toro is served by Bocas del Toro "Isla Colón" International Airport which hosts daily commuter flights from and to Panama City and San José in neighboring Costa Rica.

== Population and tourism ==
The corregimiento of Bocas del Toro has a land area of 67.3 square kilometres (26.0 sq mi) and had a population of 7,366 as of 2010, giving it a population density of 109.4 inhabitants per square kilometre (283/sq mi). Its population as of 1990 was 5,274; its population as of 2000 was 4,020.

Relatively few Panamanians live on the island, opting for cheaper housing on the mainland. Mainland residents working on Colón Island travel by boat. Bocas del Toro is a popular tourist destination year-round. The town is small enough that most places are within walking distance. The streets are arranged in a grid. Avenidas (avenues) run east to west and calles (streets) run north to south.

== Climate ==
Bocas del Toro features a tropical rainforest climate (Köppen Af). The area does not have a predictable dry season. The driest months are October, January, and March. During the course of the year Bocas del Toro sees a copious amount of precipitation, averaging 3,458 millimetres or 136.14 inches of rain per year. Temperatures are consistent all year, with maxima of 83 to 90 °F (28.3 to 32.2 °C) and minima of 71 to 75 °F (21.7 to 23.9 °C). Sunrise is normally around 6 am, and sunset is around 6 pm local time. These times vary only slightly during the year.

Climate data for Bocas del Toro (1971–2000)
Month	Jan	Feb	Mar	Apr	May	Jun	Jul	Aug	Sep	Oct	Nov	Dec	Year
Mean daily maximum °C (°F)	30.8 (87.4)	30.7 (87.3)	31.0 (87.8)	31.4 (88.5)	31.9 (89.4)	32.0 (89.6)	31.5 (88.7)	31.8 (89.2)	31.9 (89.4)	31.7 (89.1)	31.6 (88.9)	31.0 (87.8)	31.4 (88.6)
Mean daily minimum °C (°F)	20.4 (68.7)	20.2 (68.4)	20.5 (68.9)	21.4 (70.5)	22.2 (72.0)	22.2 (72.0)	21.7 (71.1)	21.8 (71.2)	22.0 (71.6)	22.0 (71.6)	21.8 (71.2)	20.6 (69.1)	21.4 (70.5)
Average rainfall mm (inches)	123.9 (4.88)	266.1 (10.48)	83.8 (3.30)	369.1 (14.53)	178.3 (7.02)	259 (10.2)	420.1 (16.54)	440.7 (17.35)	311.2 (12.25)	150.5 (5.93)	291.7 (11.48)	563.6 (22.19)	3,458 (136.15)
Average rainy days	16.6	14.6	14.8	15.2	16.7	17.9	20.9	18.4	15.8	16.4	17	20.0	204.3
Source: World Meteorological Organization

== Transportation ==
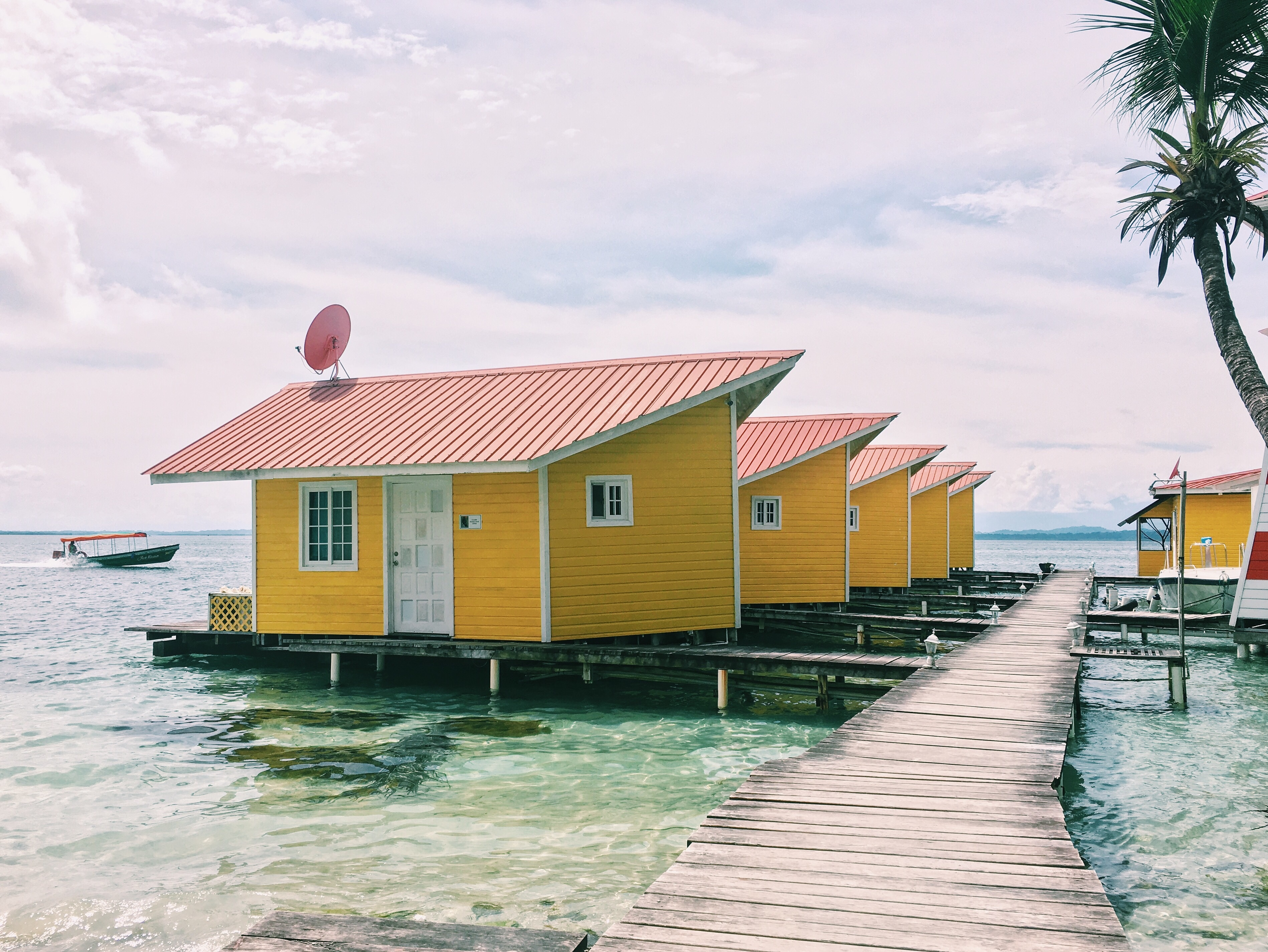
Stilt houses in Bocas del Toro

Bocas del Toro is accessible by air or boat. Most visitors fly into Bocas del Toro "Isla Colón" International Airport from Costa Rica or Panama City. Ferries connect Almirante to Bocas del Toro. Buses run between David, Almirante, Changuinola, and the Costa Rican border. Islands and islets in the Bocas del Toro Archipelago are accessible only by private boat or water taxi. Many small communities line the string of islands and very few have roads. Many companies provide boat service to various islands and diving spots.

== Infrastructure ==
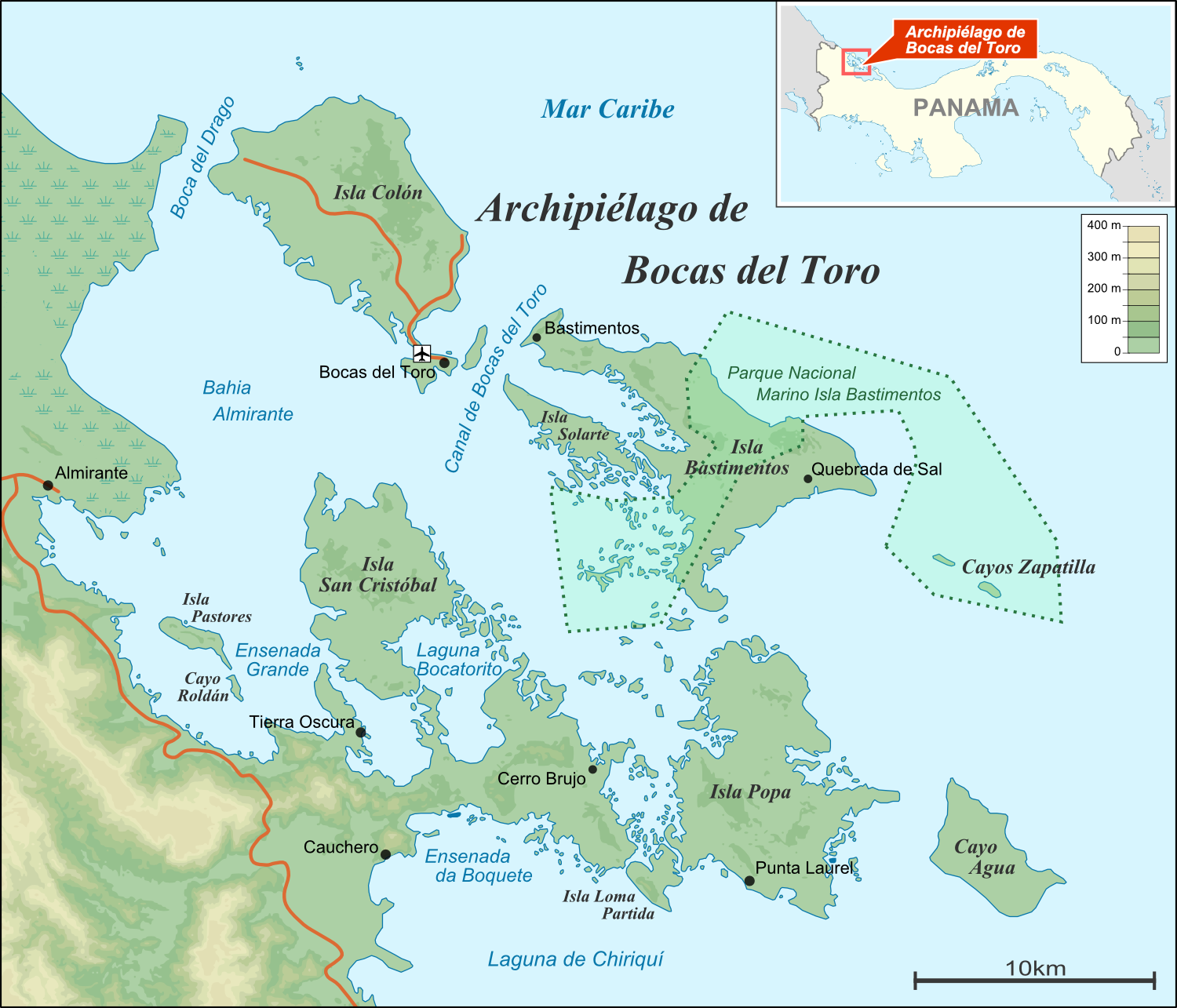
Bocas del Toro Archipelago

Bocas del Toro lacks some basic infrastructure. A generator plant provides power to the towns of Isla Colon, Carenero, and Bastimentos. The community does have a waste water (sewage) treatment plant, but not the same quality as found in the United States. The town lacks a water filtration or treatment system. Both the drinking water and the sea water have very high levels of fecal coliform bacteria.

== Health care ==
Health care is available, but facilities are limited. A public health clinic operates in town.

Common medical problems include food and waterborne diseases, insect bites, sunburns, heat stress/stroke, and dehydration.

== Attractions ==
- The Bastimentos Island National Marine Park is about a twenty-minute boat ride away, and is a major destination for ecotours.
- Isla Colon has numerous white sand beaches. Swimmers should be aware of dangerous riptides.
- Scuba Diving

Bocas del Toro is still relatively unknown as a dive destination. However, it offers a great diversity of aquatic life around its islands.

- Surfing

Bocas del Toro offers a wide range of surf spots for different levels of experience, among them Black Rock, Carenero, and Wizard Beach, as well as Bastimentos Island. November to April are considered to be peak season, as well as summertime. Bocas del Toro also hosts (inter)national surf competitions.

== Notable people ==
- Princess Angela of Liechtenstein

== See also ==
- Archaeology of Bocas del Toro
