= Cayo Agua Island =

Island in the Bocas del Toro Archipelago, Panama

Native name: Isla Cayo Agua
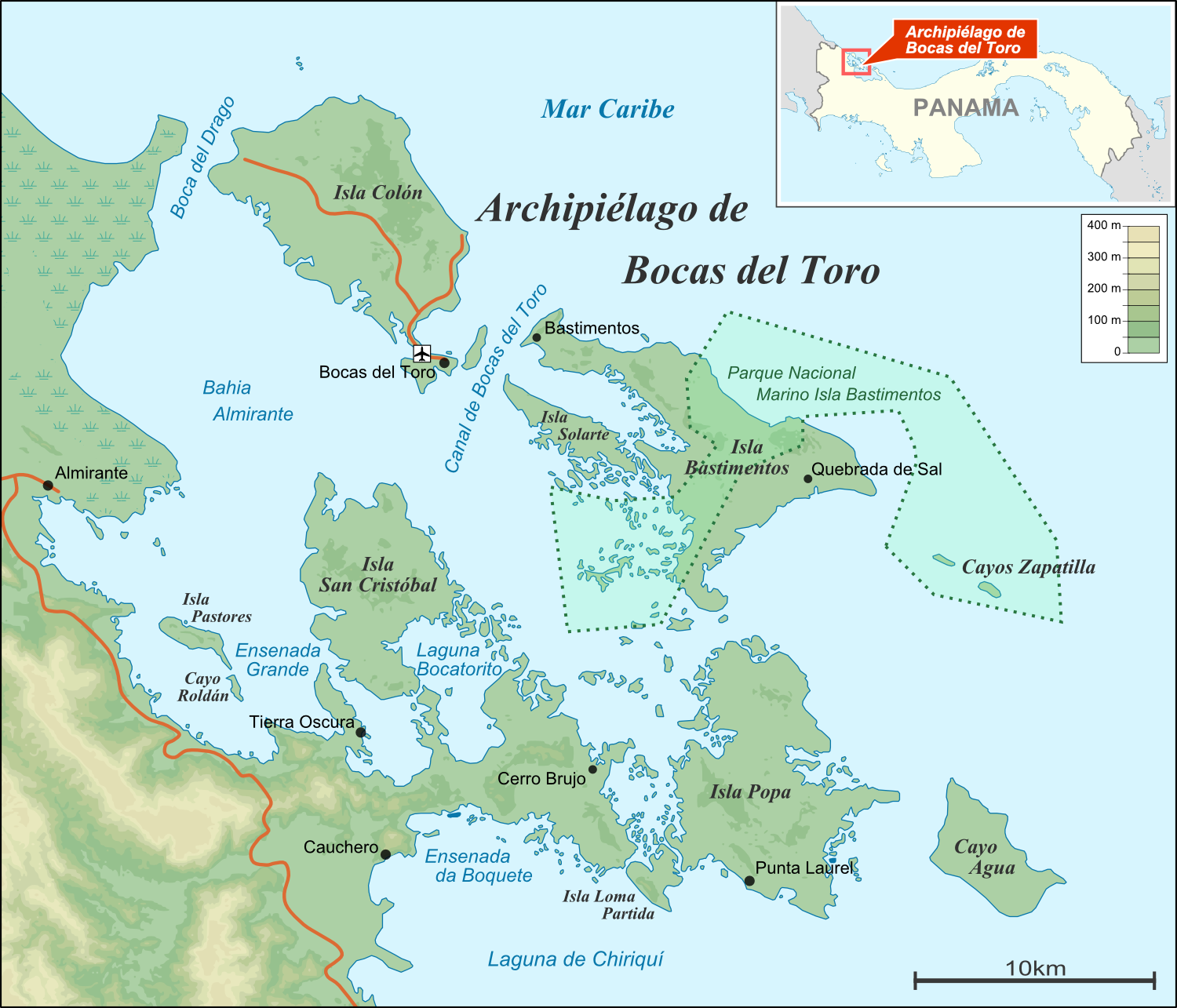
- Bocas del Toro Archipelago

- Location within Central America

Geography
- Coordinates: 9°8′N 82°2′W
- Archipelago: Bocas del Toro Archipelago
- Area: 16 km^{2} (6.2 sq mi)
- Highest elevation: 0 m (0 ft)

Administration
- Panama
- Province: Bocas del Toro
- District: Bocas del Toro

Cayo Agua (Water Cay) is the eastern and southernmost island in the Bocas del Toro Archipelago, Panama, separating Chiriquí Lagoon in the south from the Caribbean Sea in the north. It has a surface area of 16 km^{2}.

== Environment ==
The island is part of the Bocas del Toro Important Bird Area (IBA), designated as such by BirdLife International because it supports significant populations of white-crowned pigeons and three-wattled bellbirds.

== See also ==
- List of islands of Panama
