= Cauchero =

- Corregimiento
- Location within Panama
- Coordinates: 9°9′N 82°16′W
- Country: Panama
- Province: Bocas del Toro
- District: Bocas del Toro
- Established: March 7, 1997

Area
  - Land: 140.6 km^{2} (54.3 sq mi)

Population (2010)
  - Total: 2,424
  - Density: 17.2/km^{2} (45/sq mi)
- Population density calculated based on land area.
- Time zone: UTC−5 (EST)
- Climate: Af

Cauchero is a corregimiento in Bocas del Toro District, Bocas del Toro Province, Panama. It has a land area of 140.6 square kilometres (54.3 sq mi) and had a population of 2,424 as of 2010, giving it a population density of 17.2 inhabitants per square kilometre (45/sq mi). It was created by Law 10 of March 7, 1997; this measure was complemented by Law 5 of January 19, 1998 and Law 69 of October 28, 1998. Its population as of 2000 was 1,636.
