= Taboga, Panama =

Taboga
- Corregimiento
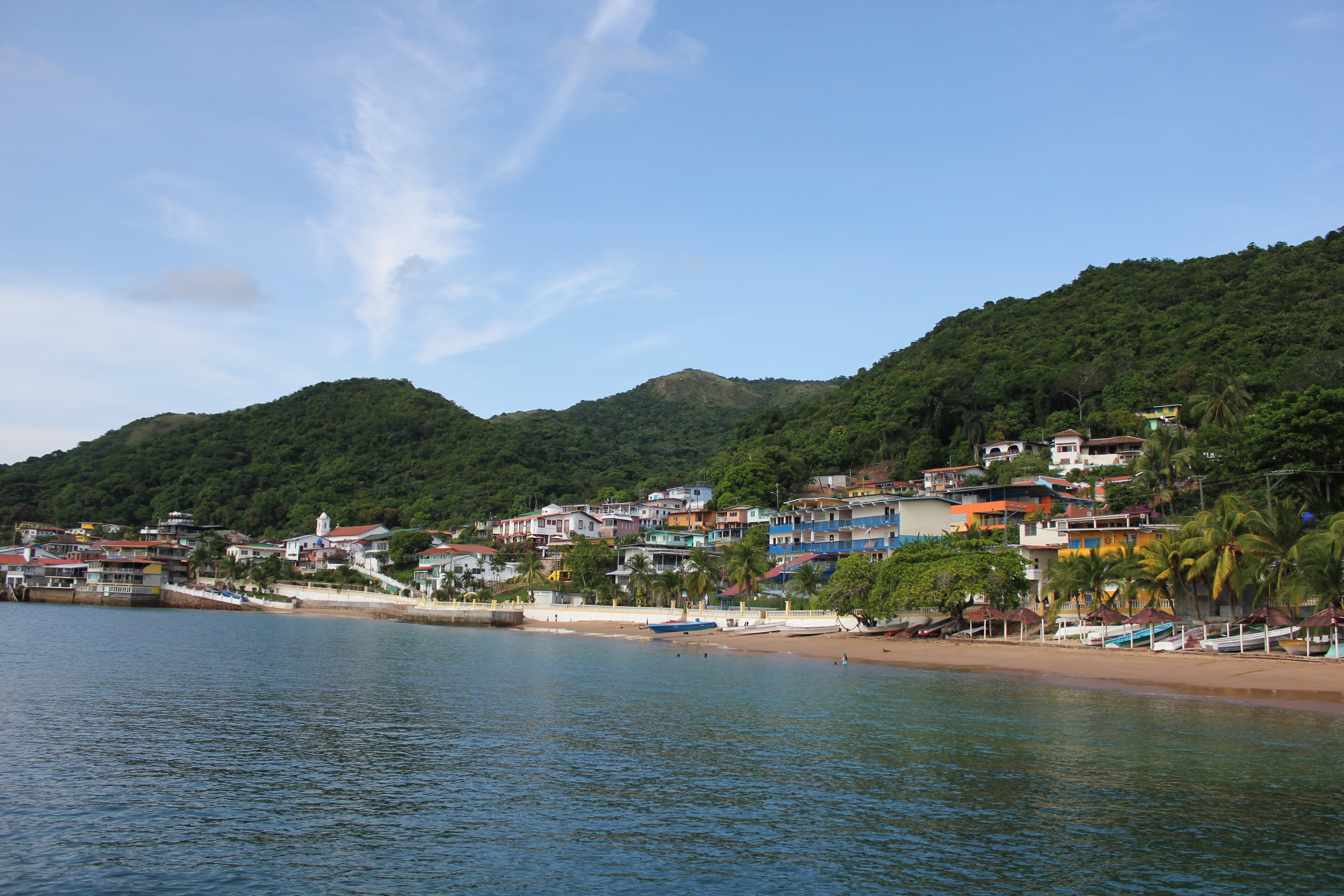

- Location within Panamá Province Location within Panama
- Coordinates: 8°47′40.63″N 79°33′17.1″W
- Country: Panama
- Province: Panamá
- District: Taboga

Area
  - Land: 8.5 km^{2} (3.3 sq mi)

Population (2010)
  - Total: 731
  - Density: 86.2/km^{2} (223/sq mi)
- Population density calculated based on land area.
- Time zone: UTC−5 (EST)

for the island see Taboga Island

Taboga is a corregimiento in Taboga District, Panamá Province, Panama with a population of 731 as of 2010. It is the seat of Taboga District. Its population as of 1990 was 1,199; its population as of 2000 was 908.
