= Isla Bastimentos National Marine Park =

Marine park in the Bocas del Toro Archipelago, Panama

Isla Bastimentos Marine National Park
- IUCN category II (national park)
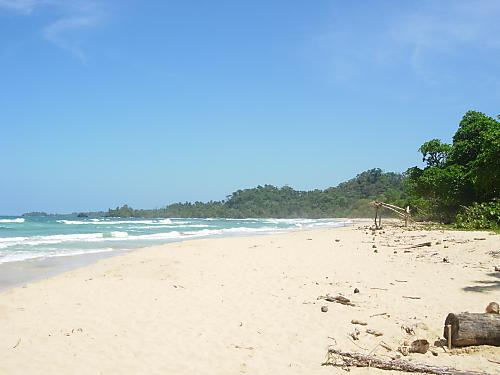
- Bastimentos Wizard
- Interactive map of Isla Bastimentos Marine National Park
- Location: Bocas del Toro Province, Panama
- Nearest city: Bastimentos
- Coordinates: 9°16′57″N 82°8′23″W
- Area: 132.26 km^{2} (51.07 sq mi)
- Established: 1988

Isla Bastimentos National Marine Park (in Spanish: Parque Nacional Marino Isla Bastimentos) is a marine park located in the Bocas del Toro Archipelago, Panama. The park covers 13,226 hectares.

== History ==
The park has been managed and protected by the National Environmental Authority of Panama (ANAM) since its creation in 1988. The Cayos Zapatillas are the most popular place to visit this park.

== Geography ==
The site has an area of 13,000 hectares. It includes multiple islands including the Cayo Zapatilla Major and other minor islands.

== Sights ==
The park protects forests, mangroves, monkeys, sloths, caiman, crocodile, and 28 species of amphibians and reptiles. Playa Larga (Long Beach), on Isla Bastimentos, that is important nesting site for sea turtles. Four species of endangered sea turtles use it as a nesting site from April through September. The rana rojo (strawberry poison-dart frog) also inhabits the island. It is home to over 250 species of fish and marine mammals.

The turtles mostly go to Playa Larga (Long Beach), which is located at the north side of the marine park.

The monkeys and sloths are seen at Quebrada de Sal (Salt Creek).

The park also has nearly eighty eighty different coral species. The corals are believed to be over 10,000 years old.

Wizard Beach. also known as Playa Primera, scenic yellow sand beach next to jungle reached by a wilderness path from Old Bank in dry weather. Further along the coast are Playa Segunda (Second Beach) and Red Frog Beach. There is also a water taxi to Red Frog Beach from a marina on the south side of the island.

== See also ==
- List of National Parks
