= Pacific Marine Energy Center =

Pacific Marine Energy Center (PMEC), formerly known as the Northwest National Marine Renewable Energy Center (NNMREC), is a partnership between Oregon State University, the University of Washington, and the University of Alaska Fairbanks. Oregon State University focuses on wave energy. University of Washington focuses on tidal energy. The three universities collaborate with each other on research, education, outreach, and engagement.

Partners in PMEC include:

- National Renewable Energy Laboratory
- Pacific Northwest National Laboratory
- Public Utility District of Snohomish County No. 1
- BioSonics, Inc.
- Electric Power Research Institute
- Verdant Power
- Pacific Northwest Economic Region
- Sound & Sea Technology
- National Marine Fisheries Service
- Washington Department of Ecology
