= Cristóbal Island =

Caribbean island belonging to Panama

Native name: Isla San Cristóbal
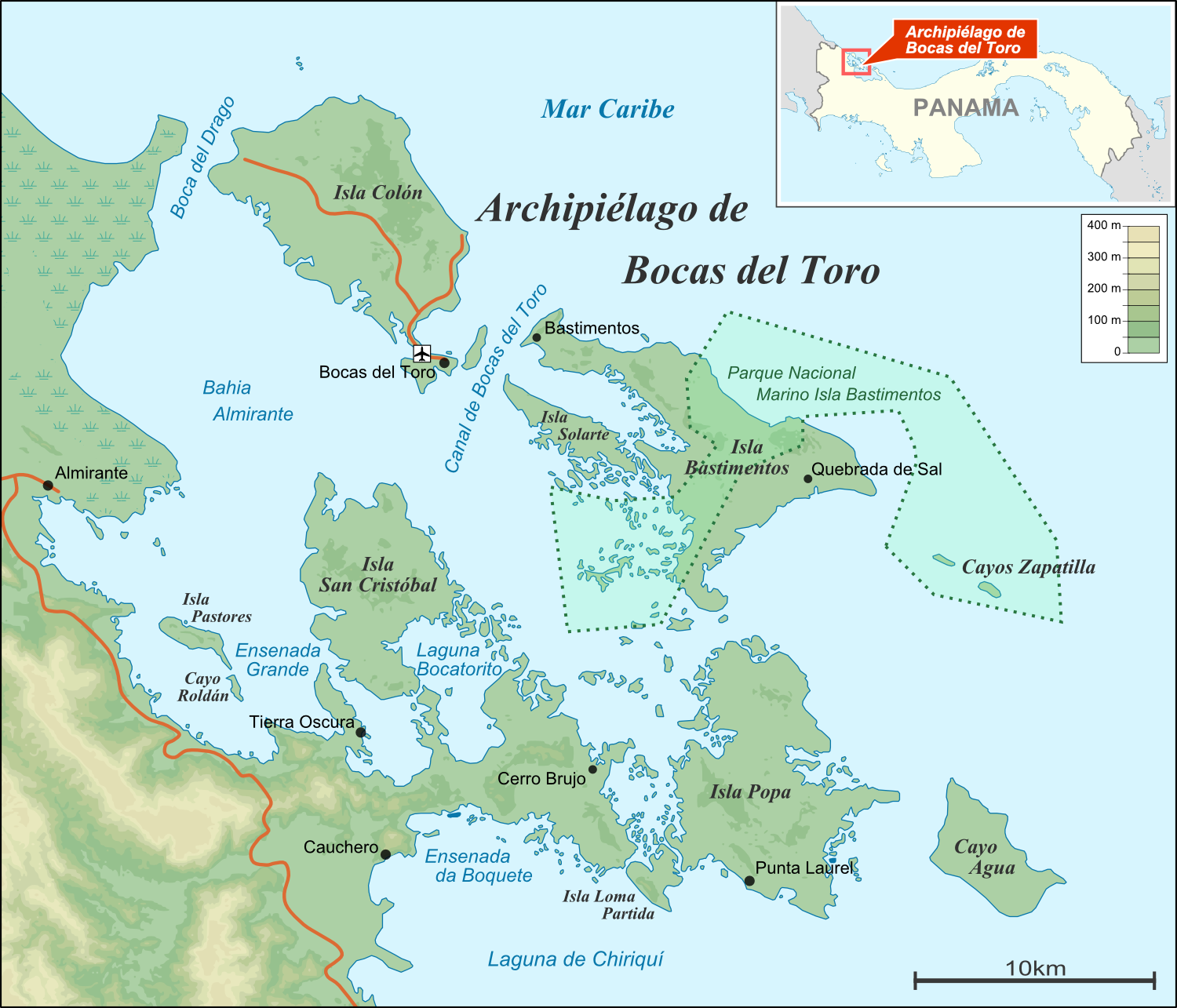
- Bocas del Toro Archipelago

Geography
- Coordinates: 9°21′N 82°14′W
- Archipelago: Bocas del Toro Archipelago
- Area: 37 km^{2} (14 sq mi)
- Highest elevation: 118 m (387 ft)
- Highest point: Cerro Botabite II

Administration
- Panama
- Province: Bocas del Toro
- District: Bocas del Toro

Cristóbal Island (in Spanish: Isla San Cristóbal, or Saint Christopher's Island) is a mostly deforested 37 km^{2} island located south of Isla Colón, in the Bocas del Toro Archipelago, Panama. It is home to the indigenous Ngäbe or Guaymí people and a small number of expatriates. Laguna Bocatorito, also known as Dolphin Bay, lies on the east side of the island.

== Environment ==
The island is part of the Bocas del Toro Important Bird Area (IBA), designated as such by BirdLife International because it supports significant populations of white-crowned pigeons and three-wattled bellbirds.

== See also ==
- List of islands of Panama
