= Bocas del Toro Archipelago =

Islands of Panama

Native name: Archipiélago de Bocas del Toro
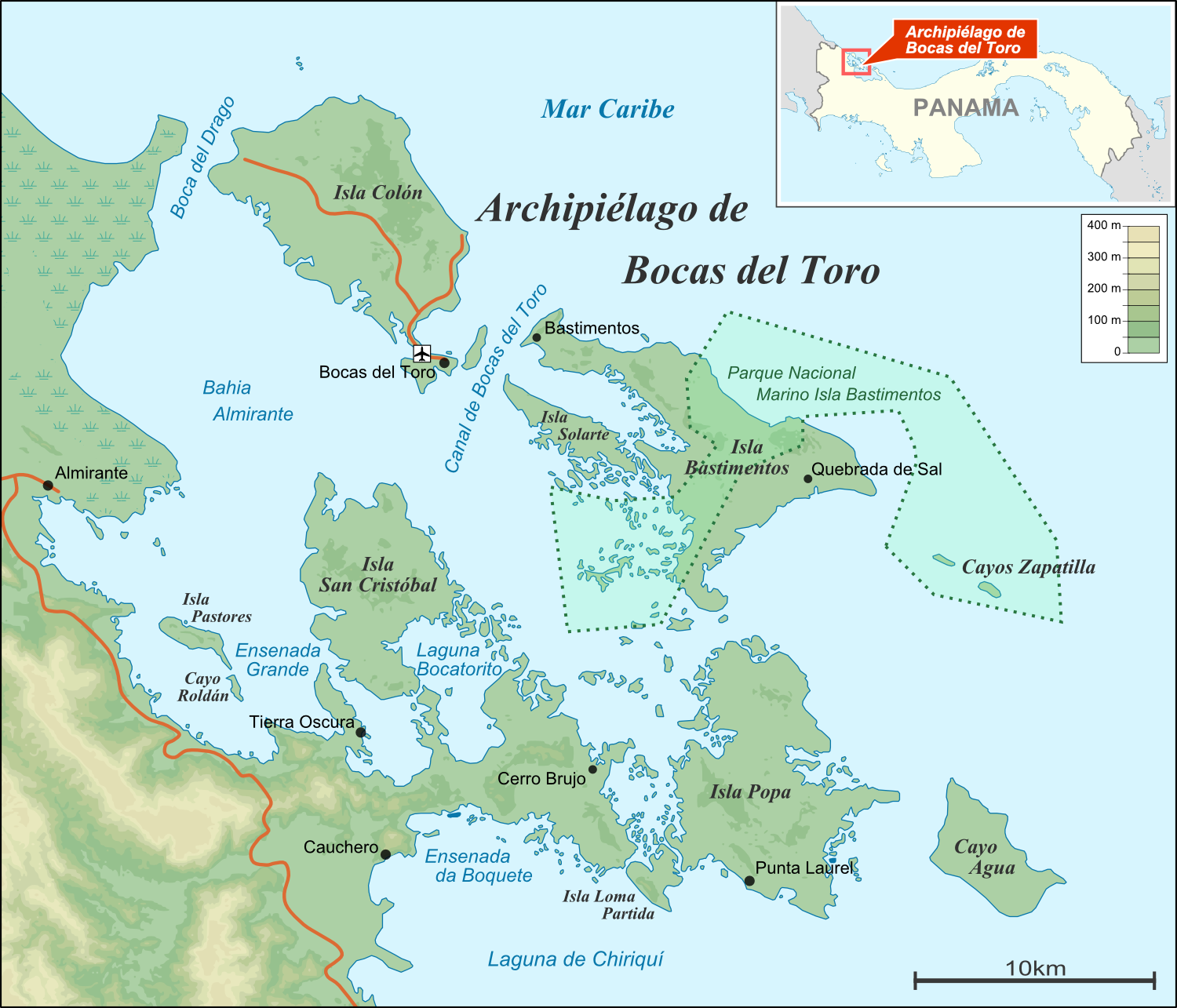
- Map of the archipelago

- Location of the Bocas del Toro Archipelago in Panama Bocas del Toro (the Caribbean)

Geography
- Coordinates: 9°15′42″N 82°09′05″W
- Area: 250 km^{2} (97 sq mi)

Administration
- Panama
- Province: Bocas del Toro Province
- District: Bocas del Toro
- Largest settlement: Bocas Town

Demographics
- Population: 13,000 (2012)
- Pop. density: 24.85/km^{2} (64.36/sq mi)

The Bocas del Toro Archipelago is a group of tropical islands in the Caribbean Sea in the north-west of Panama, within the province of Bocas del Toro, with a biodiverse ecosystem of coral reefs, mangrove and seagrass meadows.

== Geography ==
The archipelago is part of the Bocas del Toro District, located in Bocas del Toro Province. The archipelago is separated in two bodies of water, Almirante Bay and Chiriquí Lagoon. The north region of the archipelago includes the islands of Colon, Carenero, San Cristobal, Bastimentos as well as Swans Cay and Zapatilla Cays, while the south region includes Popa island and Cayo de Agua. The main islands are: Isla Colon, Bastimentos, Solarte, San Cristobal, Cayo de Agua and Popa. The archipelago also includes 50 cays and some 200 tiny islets.

=== Demography ===
The area is 250 km^{2} (97 square miles) which is about 60% of the district's area, and the population about 13,000, which is 75% of the district's population. The major city is Bocas del Toro, also called Bocas Town, on Isla Colón, other settlements include Bastimentos, Cauchero, Tierra Oscura, and Punta Laurel.

=== Climate ===
Dry seasons in the archipelago are from January to April and then from late August to October, while wet seasons are from April to August and November to December

== Biodiversity ==
Bocas del Toro Archipelago is composed of reef, mangrove, and seagrass bed ecosystems. Additionally, the archipelago fosters a variety of wildlife, including dolphins, birds, crocodiles, poison dart frogs and it also serves as a nesting site for marine turtles. The archipelago has also been designated as a Hope Spot.

Strawberry poison dart frogs (Dendrobates pumilio) found in the archipelago exhibit color polymorphisms in their populations among the islands of Colon, Popa, and Bastimentos, as well as other sites in the mainland.

The major islands of the archipelago, Colón, Bastimentos, Cristóbal, Popa, Solarte, and Cayo Agua, have been designated an Important Bird Area (IBA) by BirdLife International because they support significant populations of white-crowned pigeons and three-wattled bellbirds.

== Resource Management ==
The archipelago is managed through protected areas, with fisheries and tourism regulations, the plan was develop through taking into consideration the community through town hall meetings by the government of Panama (MiAmbiente), to promote conservation and better use of resources of the area. Bocas del Toro is considered a zone of Tourism Development of National Interest since the 1990's, as this became the most important industry in the region, placing it as one on the main touristic areas for development in Panama.

Protected areas within the archipelago of Bocas del Toro include Isla Bastimentos National Marine Park, Municipal Reserve of Bluff Beach and Hydrological Municipal Reserve of Río Mimitimbi.

The area is also included under the Ley 204 de 2021, which regulates fishing under all continental waters of the country. Species such as shrimp and lobsters have regulated seasons to prevent overfishing: shrimp fishing is limited between February 1 and April 11, and between September 1 and October 11; the lobster season runs from March 1 to July 1. As well as the prohibition of captures of sea turtles or sea turtle's eggs.

== See also ==
- List of islands of Panama
- Atlantic Ocean
- Panama
- Districts of Panama
- List of islands in the Caribbean: Panama
- Outline of Panama
- List of cities in Panama
