= Taboga District =

Taboga
- District

- Location of the district capital in Panama
- Coordinates: 8°48′N 79°33′W
- Country: Panama
- Province: Panamá
- Capital: Taboga

Area
  - Total: 12.1 km^{2} (4.7 sq mi)

Population (2019)
  - Total: 1,387
  - Density: 115/km^{2} (297/sq mi)
- official estimate
- Time zone: UTC-5 (ETZ)

Taboga (Spanish pronunciation: [taˈβoɣa]) is a district (distrito) of Panamá Province in Panama. The population according to the 2000 census was 1,402; the latest official estimate (for 2019) is 1,387. The district covers a total area of 12.1 km^{2} (4.7 sq mi). The capital lies at the town of Taboga.

Taboga is an island district that includes the islands of Taboga, Taboguilla, Otoque, Urabá, Melones, Chamá, and Estivá. Taboga itself is 8 miles (13 km) long and is 12 miles (19 km) away from the mainland.

It was the home of Francisco Pizarro, where he built boats for his conquest of the Incas in 1539.

== Administrative divisions ==
Taboga District is divided administratively into the following corregimientos:

- Taboga (capital)
- Otoque Occidente
- Otoque Oriente
