= Solarte Island =

Caribbean island belonging to Panama

Native name: Isla Solarte
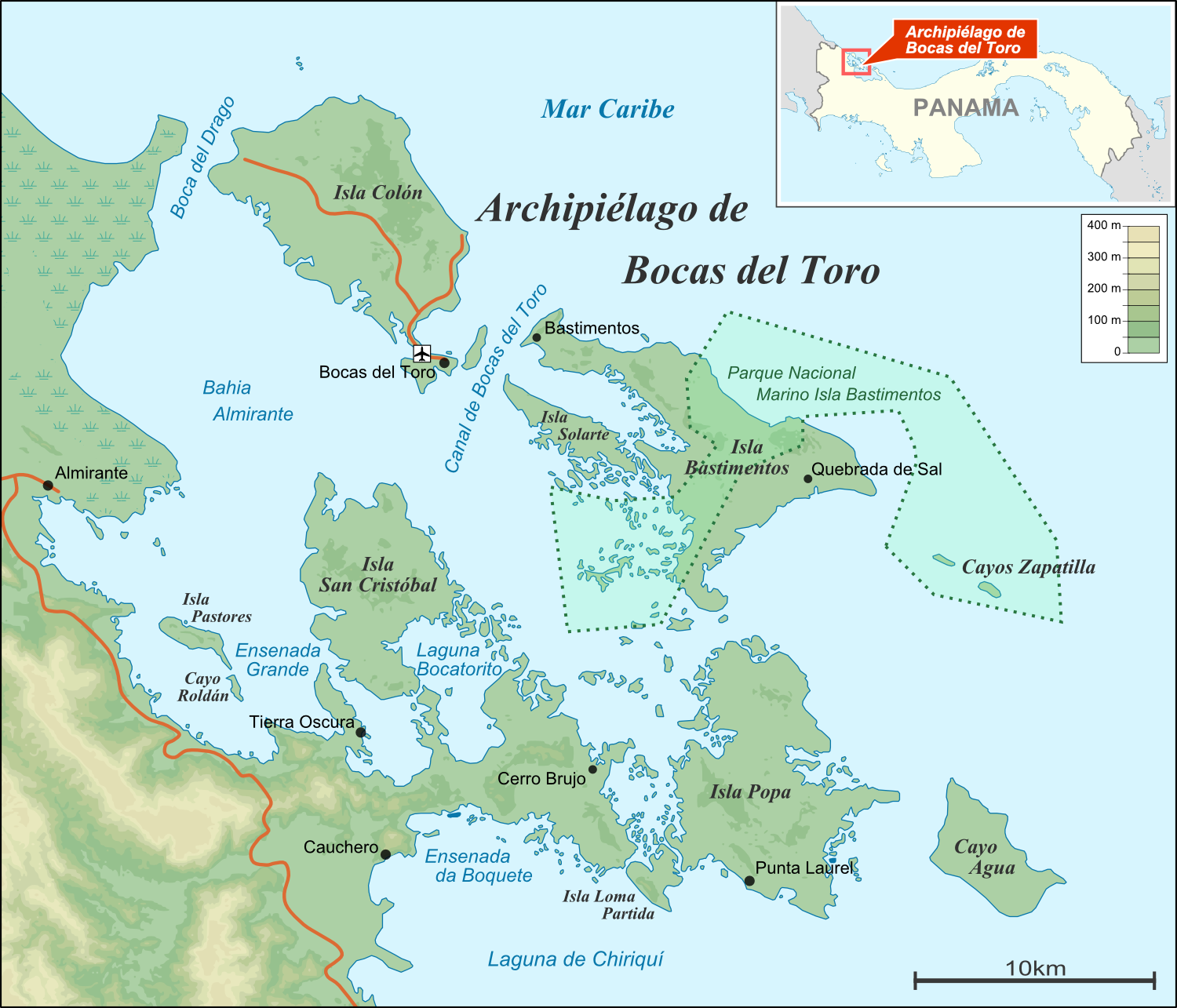
- Bocas del Toro Archipelago

Geography
- Coordinates: 9°18′N 82°11′W
- Archipelago: Bocas del Toro Archipelago
- Area: 8 km^{2} (3.1 sq mi)
- Highest elevation: 0 m (0 ft)

Administration
- Panama
- Province: Bocas del Toro
- District: Bocas del Toro

Demographics
- Population: 285

Solarte Island (in Spanish: Isla Solarte), also known as Nancy's Cay, (in Spanish: Cayo Nancy) is an eight km^{2} island located only one mile east of Bocas del Toro, in the Bocas del Toro Province, Panama. The two hundred Ngöbe Buglé fishing community lives on the island without electricity or telephone system, capturing water from a well.

A medical facility, later known as Hospital Point (in Spanish: Punta Hospital), was built upon a hill on the western end of the island by the United Fruit Company for treatment of patients with yellow fever and malaria in 1899 but it was decommissioned and moved to Almirante in 1920.

== Environment ==
The island is part of the Bocas del Toro Important Bird Area (IBA), designated as such by BirdLife International because it supports significant populations of white-crowned pigeons and three-wattled bellbirds.

== See also ==
- List of islands of Panama
