= Bastimentos Island =

Caribbean island belonging to Panama

Bastimentos
- Corregimiento and town
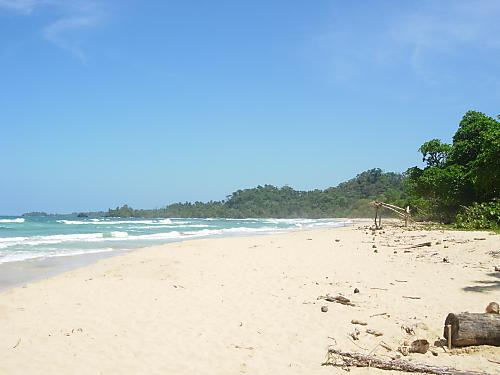
- Interactive map of Bastimentos
- Location within Panama
- Coordinates: 9°21′N 82°12′W
- Country: Panama
- Province: Bocas del Toro
- District: Bocas del Toro

Area
  - Land: 62.2 km^{2} (24.0 sq mi)

Population (2010)
  - Total: 1,954
  - Density: 31.4/km^{2} (81/sq mi)
- Population density calculated based on land area.
- Time zone: UTC-5 (ETZ)

Bastimentos Island (in Spanish: Isla Bastimentos) is an island with eponymous town, and corregimiento located in the Bocas del Toro District and archipelago of Bocas del Toro Province, Panama. The island is about 62 square kilometres (24 sq mi), one of the largest in Panama. Bastimentos had a population of 1,954 as of 2010, giving it a population density of 31.4 inhabitants per square kilometre (81/sq mi). Its population as of 1990 was 988; its population as of 2000 was 1,344.

Often considered the more relaxed alternative to the busy streets and bars of Bocas del Toro District but at only 10 minutes by water taxi Isla Bastimentos is becoming an increasingly popular destination for backpackers. Isla Bastimentos National Marine Park and the Red Frog Island Resort's Nature Preserve encompass a large portion of Bastimentos Island, Zapatilla Cays, as well as the waters and mangroves that surround the island. The western tip of the island, better known as Bastimentos, is clearly visible from Bocas town, and is not part of the National Park itself. There are several private residences here.

== History ==
Christopher Columbus landed his boat here in 1502 on his 4th voyage and called the island Bastimentos which means "provisions." It is not to be confused with another Bastimentos Island and port about 270 km to the east, and 11 km to the north-east of Porto Bello.

== Geography ==
The terrain of the island is rather hilly. There are some lava rock outcroppings.

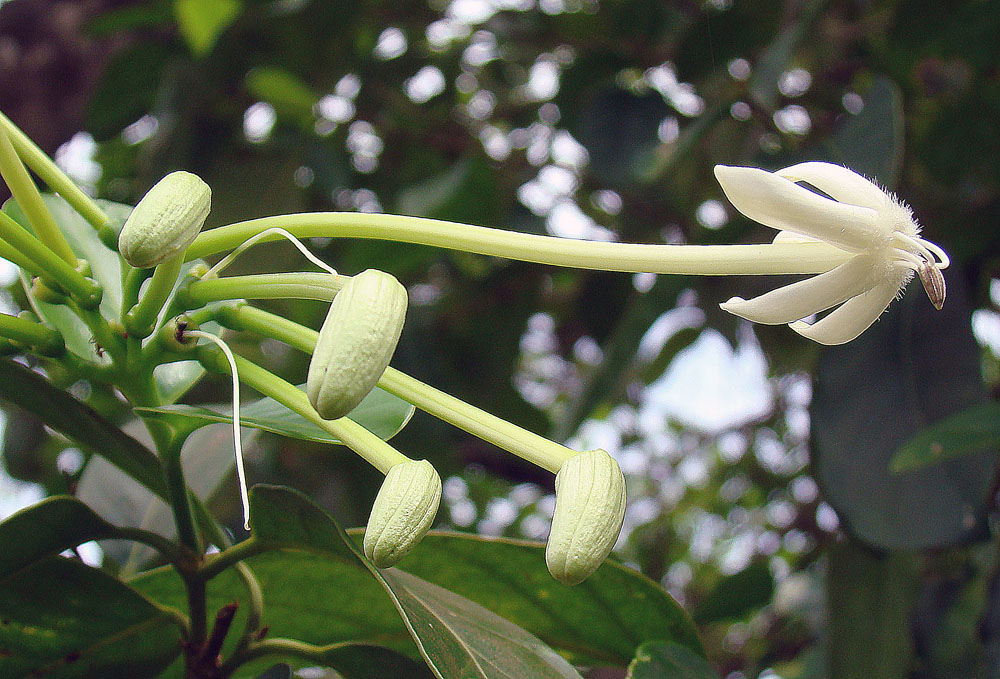
Posoqueria latifolia, the Needle Flower, on Bastimentos Island

=== Landscape ===
The north eastern side of Bastimentos Island faces the Caribbean Sea. Five beaches are found here along with stretches of cove inlets and coral reef. These beaches are: Wizard Beach, Red Frog Beach, Turtle Beach, North Beach and Playa Larga. The south western side of the island has a mangrove coastline with very calm water year round. The landscape is much more dramatic, with large rock faces, stretches of long beaches, in addition to coves and inlets. Most tourists take a 15-minute water taxi ride from Bocas Town to the south side of Bastimentos and walk across the island to Red Frog Beach.

Virtually all of the beaches are located on this western side of the island, including the popular Red Frog Beach, which got its name from small, red frogs known as Strawberry Poison-dart frogs that inhabit the forest near the beach. The most common entrance point is via Red Frog Marina, which is located on the western (opposite) side of the island.

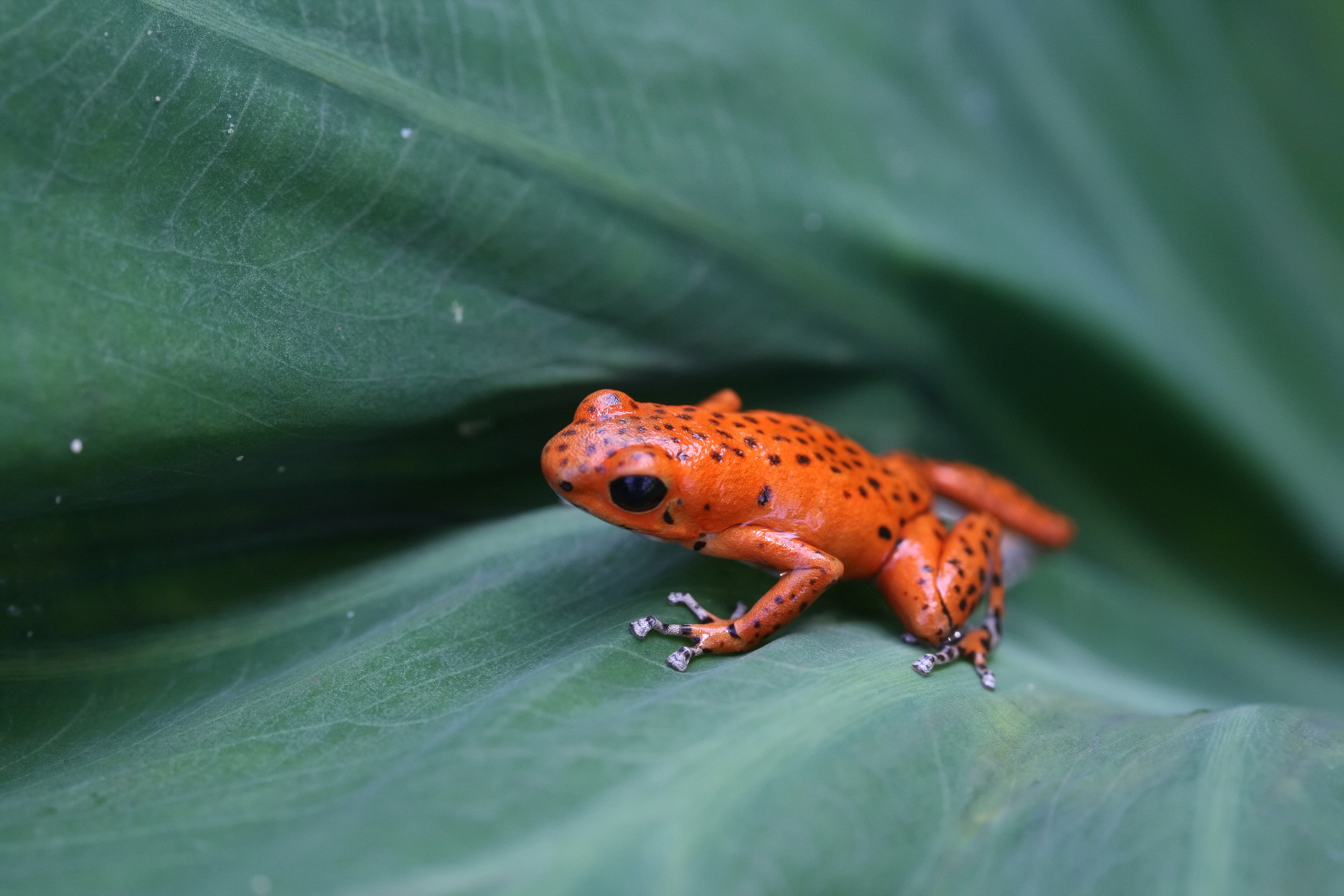
Red Poison-dart frog (Oophaga pumilio) - detail.

Crawl Cay and Zapatilla Cays are islands situated near the southern and eastern portions of the island. A network of informal trails connects the town of Old Bank to Red Frog Resort and the Marina, as well as a road network built at Red Frog Resort connects the resort with the marina, Red Frog Beach, and various other hostels and hotels near the marina.

=== Flora and fauna ===
The island's eastern side is lined with dense, lush mangroves and enjoys calmer water, partially due to the water's shallow depths. White faced monkeys are common, as are sloths and Strawberry poison-dart frogs, much beloved by visitors, despite the fearsome name. They make a loud, raucous sound throughout the day. Red Frog Beach (Playa Pata Rojo) is the island's most accessible and frequently visited beach area. During the rainy season, dolphins can regularly be seen swimming with their offspring within the various coves in the area, accessed only by boat or trail.

The island is part of the Bocas del Toro Important Bird Area (IBA), designated as such by BirdLife International because it supports significant populations of white-crowned pigeons and three-wattled bellbirds.

=== Climate ===
Between the months of April to June and August through October the water conditions tend to be the calmest, and at times this portion of the island can be accessed. Although the larger wave season stretches from August to March, the island can still be accessed easily and many surfers come to the area, and there are many sunny days during this period.

== Tourism ==
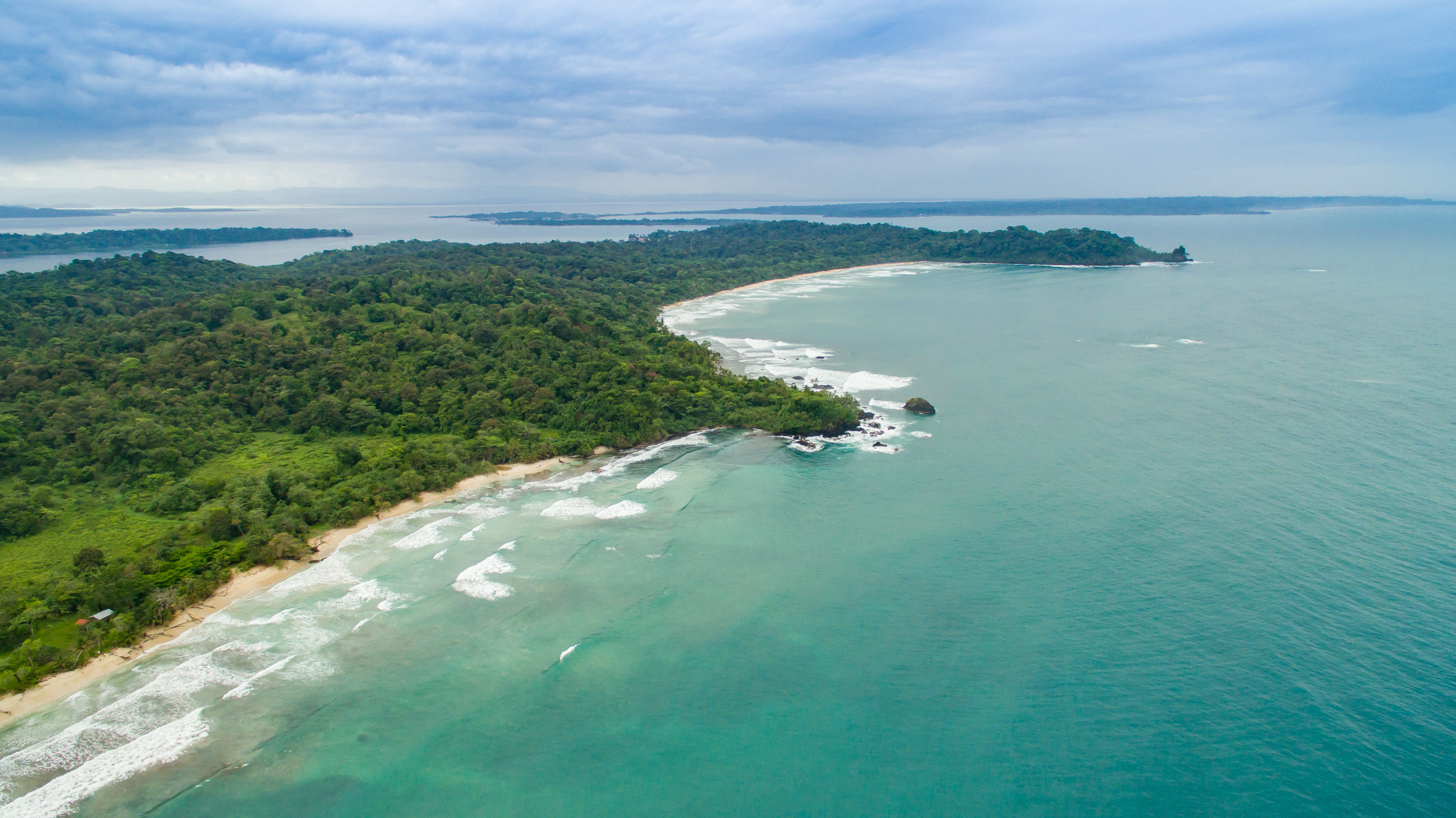
Red Frog Beach, Bastimentos Island

There is a Canopy Zipline Tour on the island at the Red Frog Beach Resort and a cave tour up salt creek on the island. There are now many places to stay on Isla Bastimentos including beaches, views of Caribbean coast and the atmosphere are just a few of the attractions of this island. There are numerous trails across the island through rainforests that provide an experience of nature.

== See also ==
- List of islands of Panama
- Protected areas of Panama
