= Colón Island =

Caribbean island belonging to Panama

Colón Island Isla Colón
- Islands of Panama
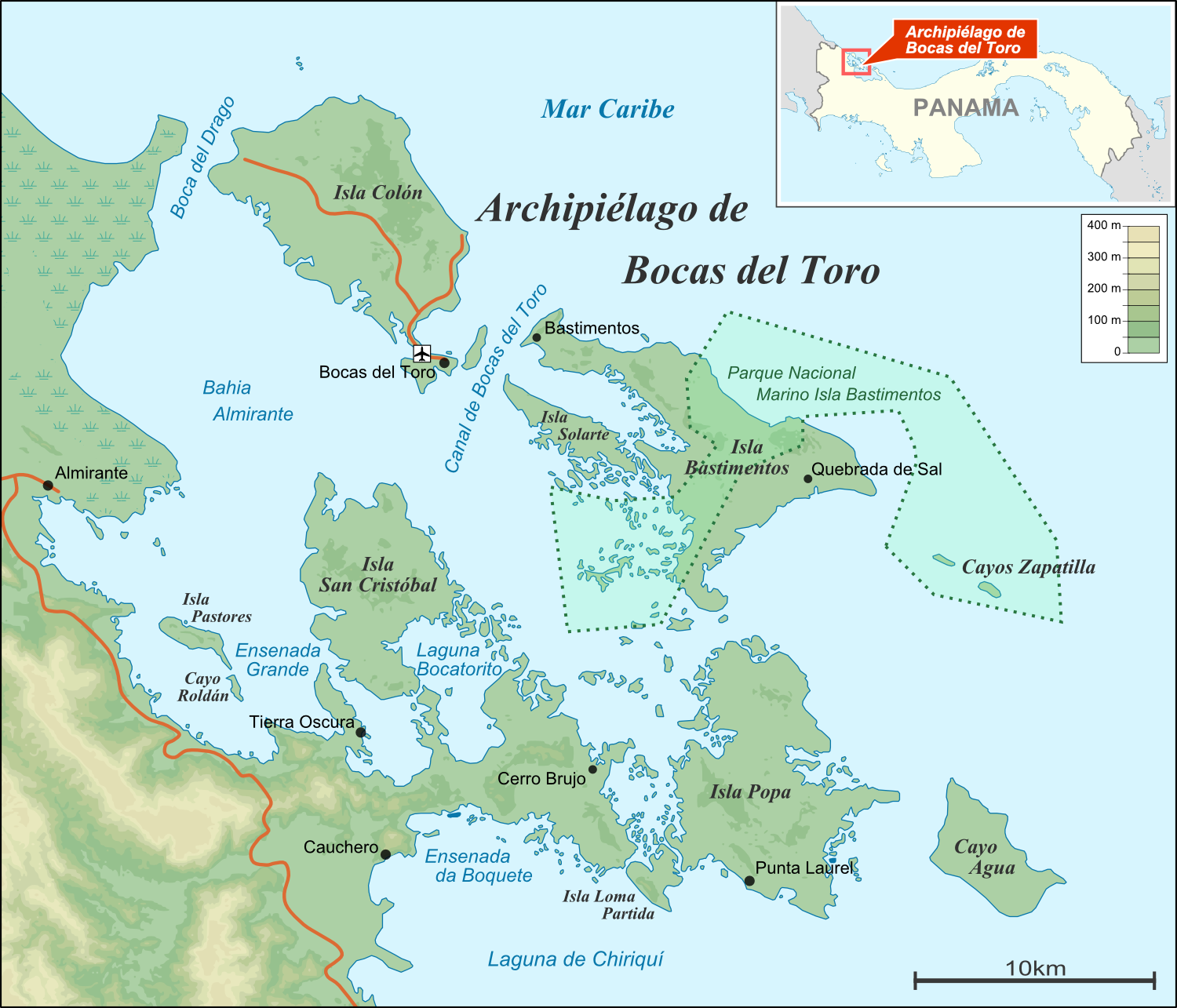
- Bocas del Toro Archipelago

- Flag

- Location of Isla Colón in Panama Colón Island (the Caribbean)
- Coordinates: 9°23′15″N 82°15′30″W
- Country: Panama
- State: Bocas del Toro Province
- District: Bocas del Toro
- Capital: Bocas del Toro

Population
  - Total: 6,629
- Time zone: UTC-5 (Eastern Standard Time)
  - Summer (DST): UTC-5 (No DST)

Colón Island (Spanish: Isla Colón) is the northernmost and main island in the Bocas del Toro Archipelago located in Bocas del Toro Province, Panama. The capital city of the province, Bocas del Toro, is located on the island and is one of Panama's main tourist attractions with over 150,000 visitors per year and an 8% annual rate of growth in tourism.

== Facilities ==
Beachfront hotels, restaurants, night clubs, discothèques, and residential districts are prominent on Colón Island.

- Beaches: Itsmito Beach, also known as La Feria, Big Creek, Bluff, Mimitibi, Bocas del Drago, Starfish.
- Important locations: Main Park, Governor's Building, Hotel Bahia, Airport, Hospital, Cemetery, La Feria, Bluff, La Gruta bat cave, Bocas del Drago.

=== Access ===
The island has a strong boating community. Access to the other nearby islands in the archipelago requires either a private boat or rental of a water taxi.

By air, the island can be reached from Panama City via Air Panama.

From Almirante you may take a ferry or water taxi service.

The island has several marinas available for international boaters.

Local taxi service is provided mainly by yellow pickup trucks with 1T- followed by a number on the doors, and by 15 passenger mini-buses marked as Transporte Colectivo.

== Geography ==
=== Environment ===
The island is part of the Bocas del Toro Important Bird Area (IBA), designated as such by BirdLife International because it supports significant populations of white-crowned pigeons and three-wattled bellbirds.

=== Climate ===
Under the Köppen climate classification, Colon Island has a tropical wet climate. Temperatures remain constant throughout the year, averaging around 26.5 °C (79.7 °F).

Climate data for Isla Colón (1972–2013)
Month	Jan	Feb	Mar	Apr	May	Jun	Jul	Aug	Sep	Oct	Nov	Dec	Year
Mean daily maximum °C (°F)	34.4 (93.9)	34.2 (93.6)	32.8 (91.0)	34.4 (93.9)	36.0 (96.8)	38.2 (100.8)	33.2 (91.8)	35.6 (96.1)	33.6 (92.5)	33.0 (91.4)	33.0 (91.4)	32.6 (90.7)	38.2 (100.8)
Mean daily minimum °C (°F)	17.6 (63.7)	18.0 (64.4)	17.6 (63.7)	17.4 (63.3)	17.6 (63.7)	17.6 (63.7)	17.0 (62.6)	15.9 (60.6)	17.6 (63.7)	18.0 (64.4)	19.6 (67.3)	17.0 (62.6)	15.0 (59.0)
Average rainfall mm (inches)	29.3 (1.15)	10.1 (0.40)	13.1 (0.52)	64.7 (2.55)	225.1 (8.86)	235.0 (9.25)	168.5 (6.63)	219.9 (8.66)	253.9 (10.00)	330.7 (13.02)	252.3 (9.93)	104.6 (4.12)	1,907.2 (75.09)
Average rainy days (≥ 0.1 mm)	2.9	1.3	1.4	4.9	15.0	16.0	14.0	15.0	17.0	20.0	16.0	7.5	131.0
Mean monthly sunshine hours	228.9	245.2	183.9	173.1	108.5	116.3	106.1	118.1	99.2	103.9	139.8	120.5	1,743.5
Source: ETESA (sunshine data recorded at Bocas del Toro International Airport)

== Gallery ==
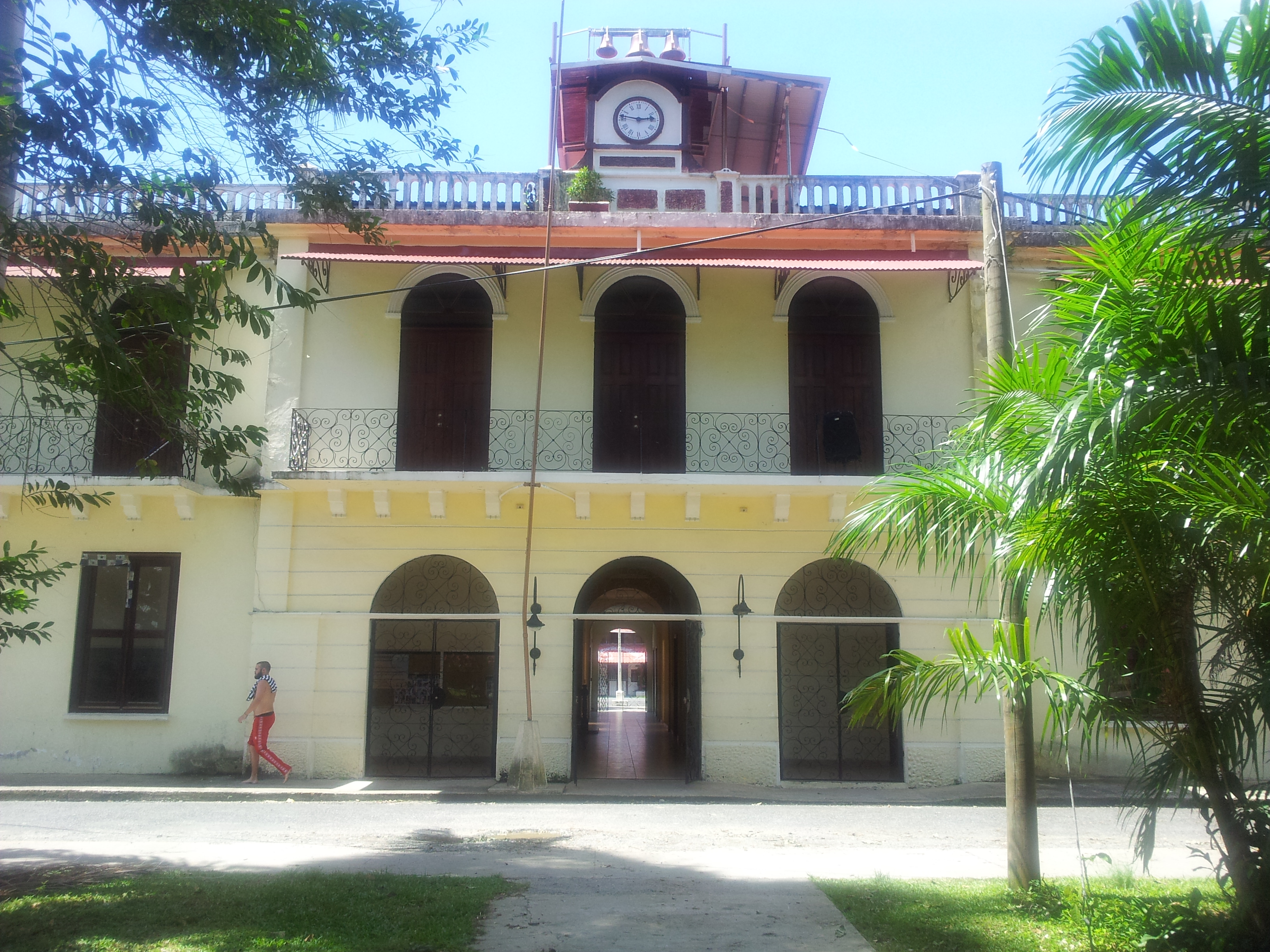
Governor´s Building

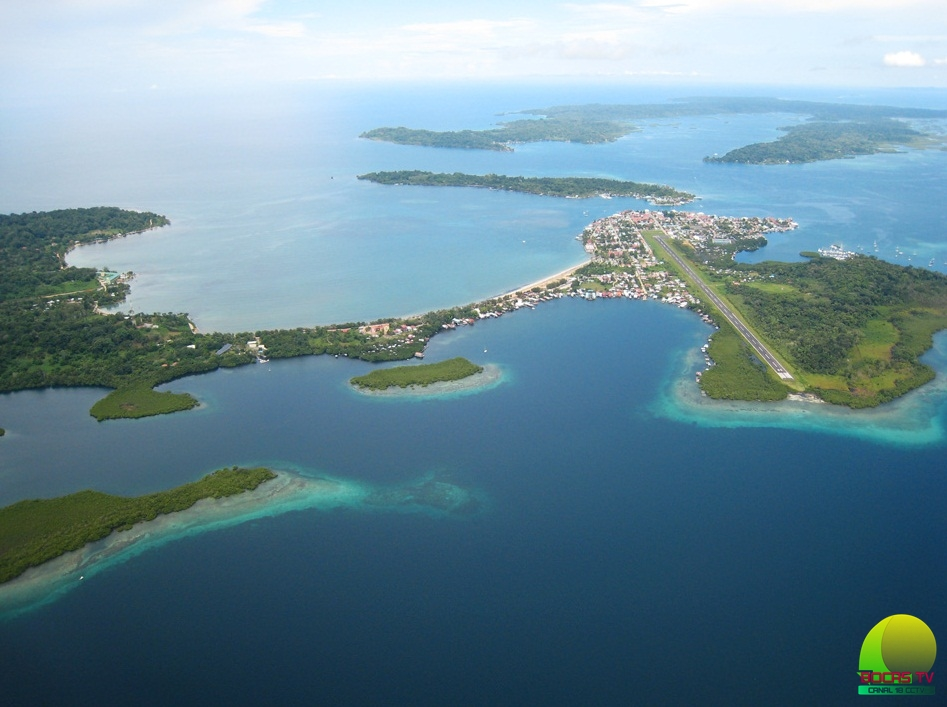
Aerial view

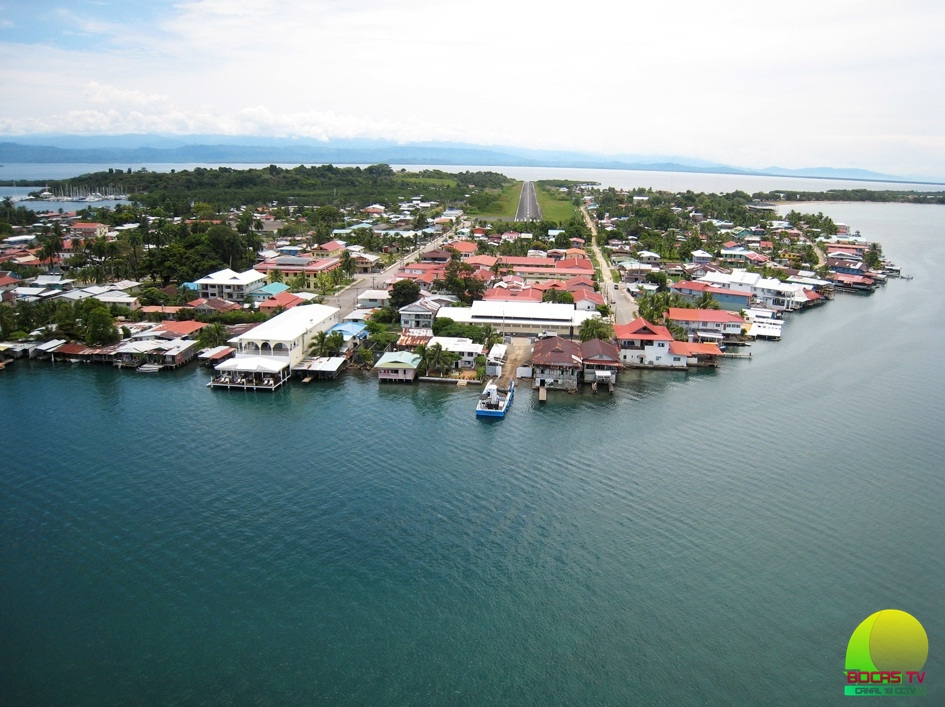
Waterfront

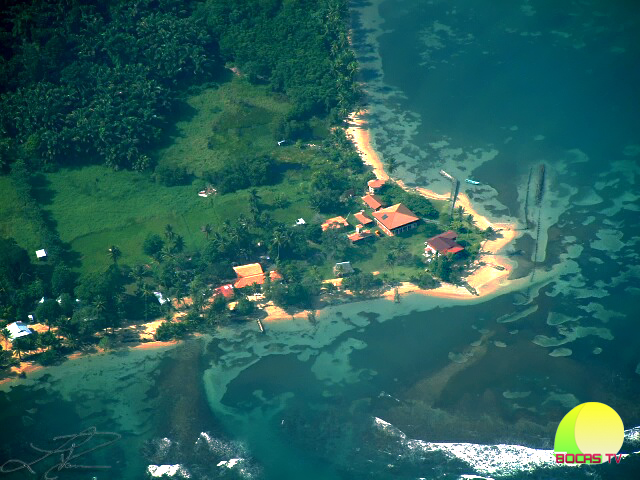
Bocas del Drago

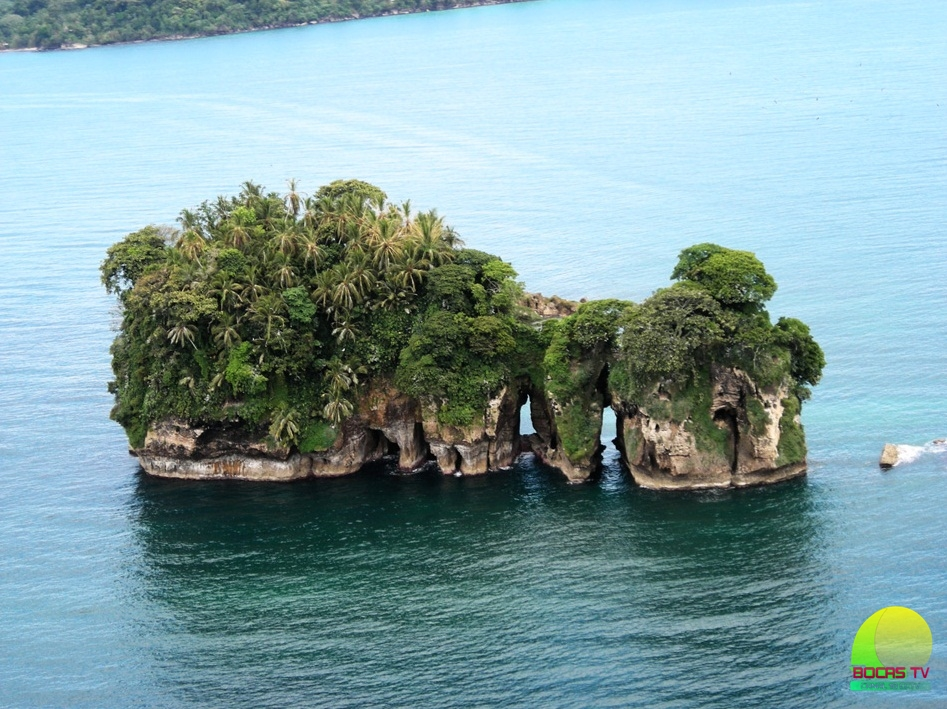
Swans Cay

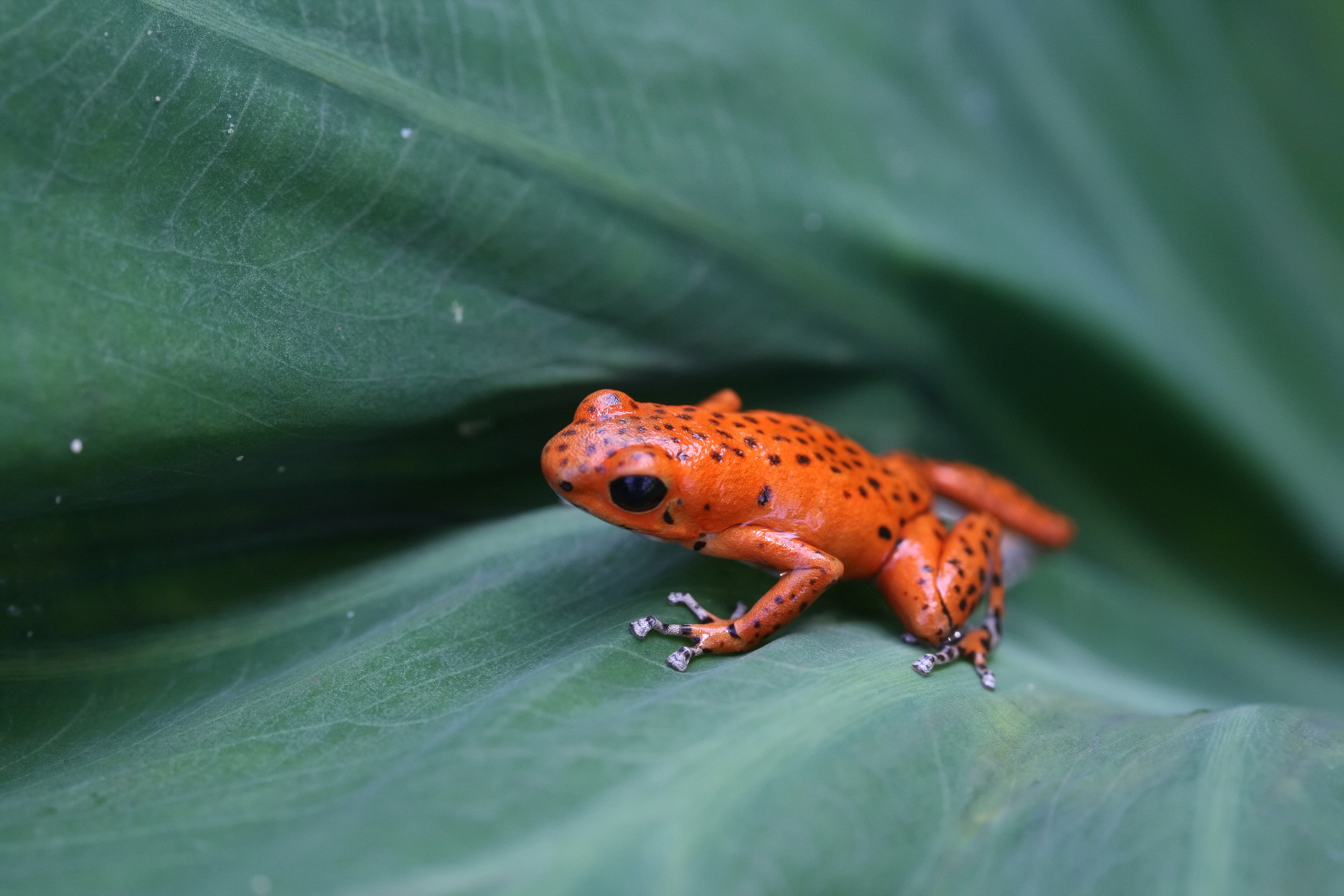
Red poison dart frog

== See also ==
- List of islands of Panama
