= Popa Island =

Caribbean island belonging to Panama

Native name: Isla Popa
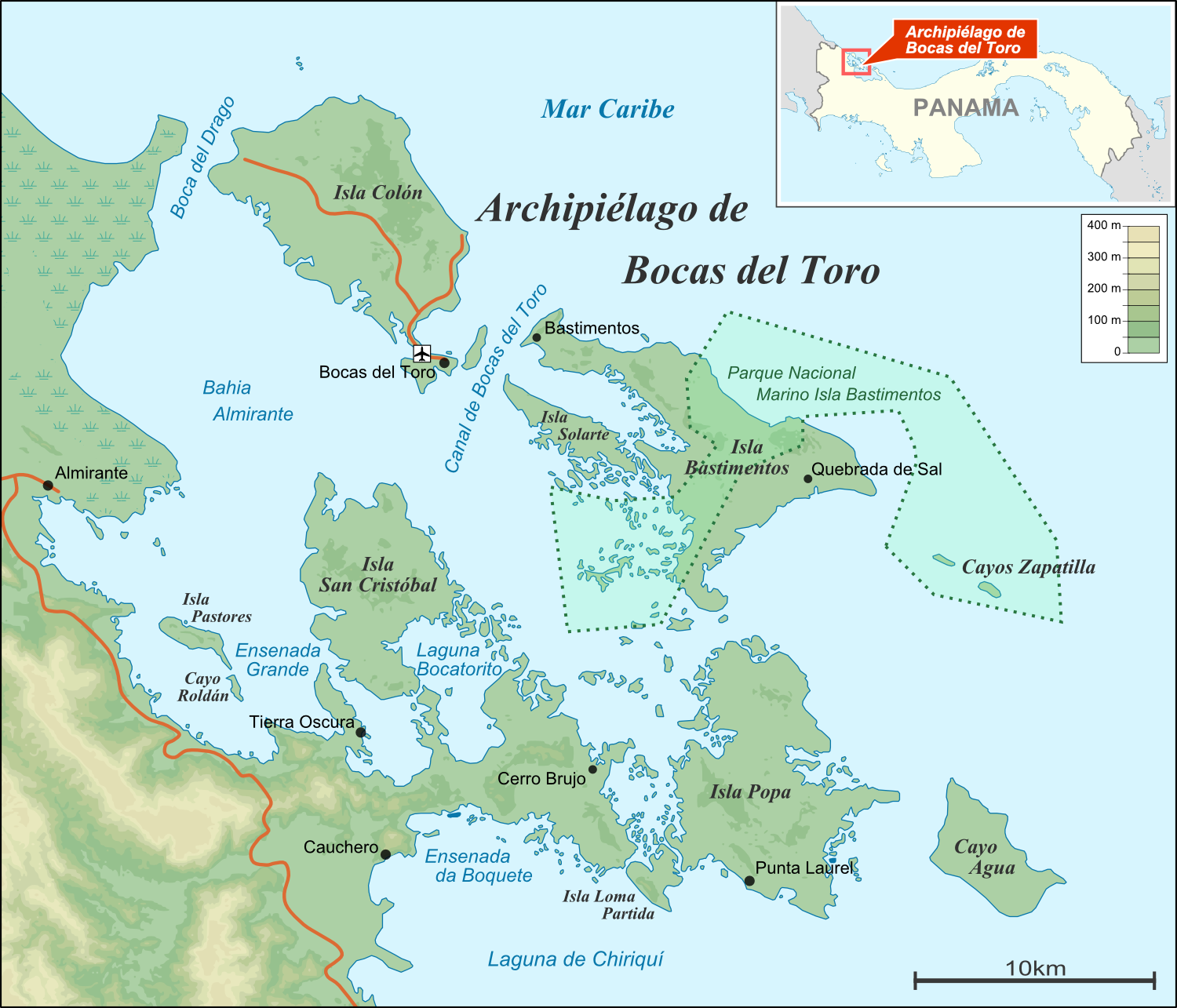
- Bocas del Toro Archipelago

Geography
- Coordinates: 9°9′N 82°7′W
- Archipelago: Bocas del Toro Archipelago
- Area: 53 km^{2} (20 sq mi)
- Highest elevation: 0 m (0 ft)

Administration
- Panama
- Province: Bocas del Toro
- District: Bocas del Toro

Popa Island (in Spanish: Isla Popa) is the second largest island in the Bocas del Toro Archipelago, Panama, with 53 square kilometres (20 square miles).

== Environment ==
The island is part of the Bocas del Toro Important Bird Area (IBA), designated as such by BirdLife International because it supports significant populations of white-crowned pigeons and three-wattled bellbirds.

== See also ==
- List of islands of Panama
