= Protected areas of Panama =

Protected areas of Panama include:

- Arraiján Protected Forest (Bosque Protector de Arraiján)
- Boca Vieja Beach Wildlife Refuge (Refugio de Vida Silvestre Playa Boca Vieja)
- Calobre Springs Natural Monument (Monumento Natural de Los Pozos de Colobre) in Calobre District
- Cerro Ancón Reserve (Reserva Cerro Ancón)
- Colón Island Natural Reserve on Colón Island
- Forestal Canglón Reserve
- Filo del Tallo Hydrological Reserve
- Metropolitan Natural Park (Parque Natural Metropolitano)
- Narganá Wilderness Area (Area Silvestre de Narganá)
- Punta Patiño Natural Reserve
- San Lorenzo Protected Area
- Serrania del Bagre Biological Corridor
- Comarca of Kuna Yala
- Chagres River
- Swamps and Wetlands of the Bay of Panamá (Manglares y Humedales de la Bahía de Panamá)
- Humedales del Golfo de Montijo
- Lago Alajuela
- Cienega de las Macanas (La Macanas Cienega)
- Parque Central
- Manglares (swamp / wetland areas)
- Palo Seco Forest Reserve (Bosque Protector de Palo Seco)
- Isla Solarte (Solarte Island, part of which is in a National Marine Park)
- Wizard Beach on Isla Bastimentos (Bastimentos Island) near Parque Nacional Marino Isla Bastimentos
- Yeguada Lagoon Forst Reserve (Reserva Forestal La Yeguada) at the Yeguada Lagoon (Laguna Yeguada)
- San San-Pond Sak Humedal Ramsar San San-Pond Sak
- Barú Volcano (Volcán Barú)
- Fortuna Forest Reserve (Reserva Forestal De Fortuna)

== National parks ==
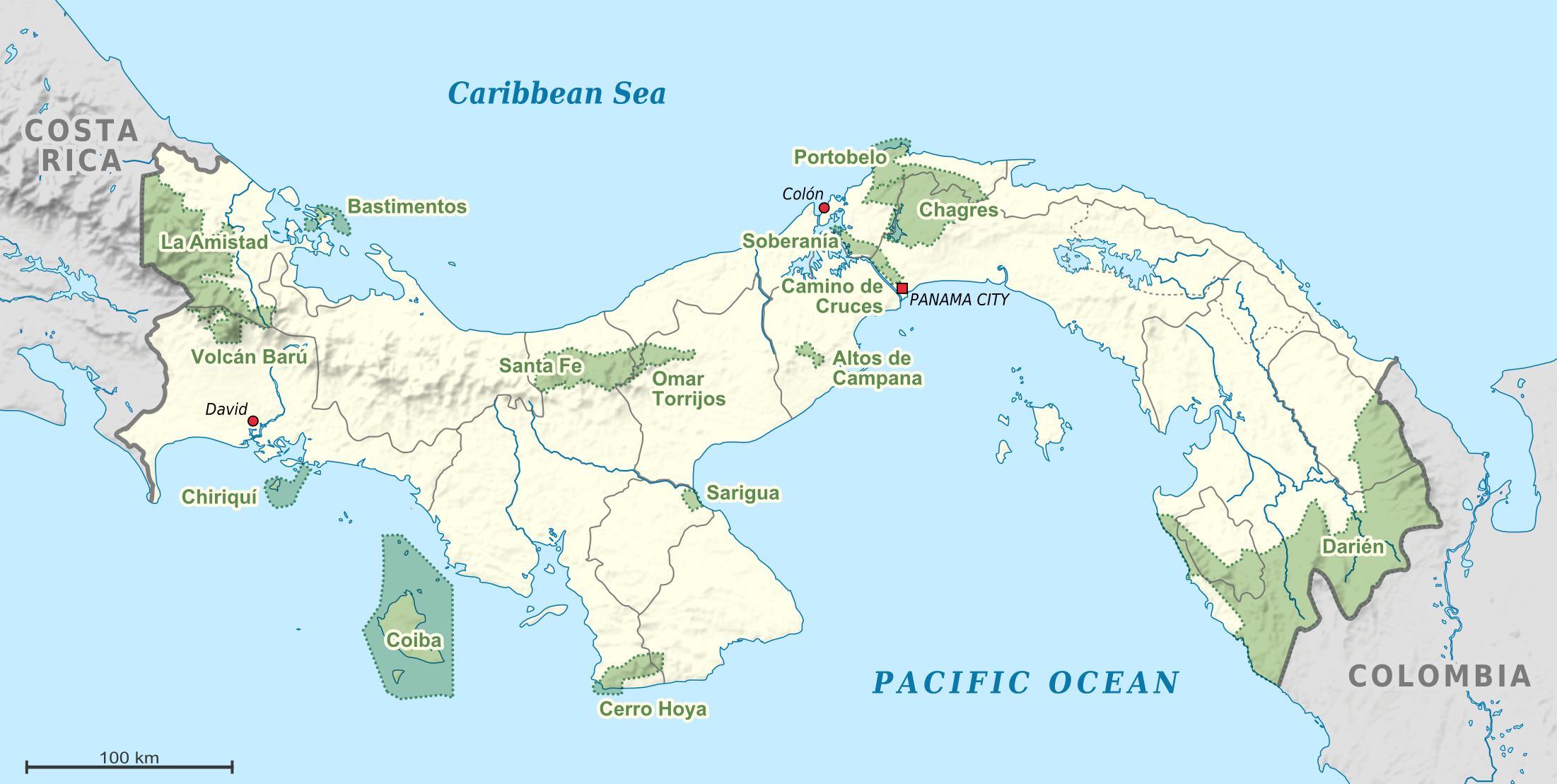
A map of Panama's national parks.

National parks in Panama (List of national parks of Panama) include:

- Altos de Campana National Park
- Barro Colorado Island
- Cerro Hoya National Park
- Chagres National Park
- Coiba National Park
- Darién National Park
- Omar Torrijos "El Cope" National Park
- Chiriquí Gulf National Marine Park
- Isla Bastimentos National Marine Park
- La Amistad International Park
- Las Cruces Trail National Park
- Portobelo National Park
- Sarigua National Park
- Soberanía National Park
- Volcan Baru National Park
