= List of national parks of Panama =

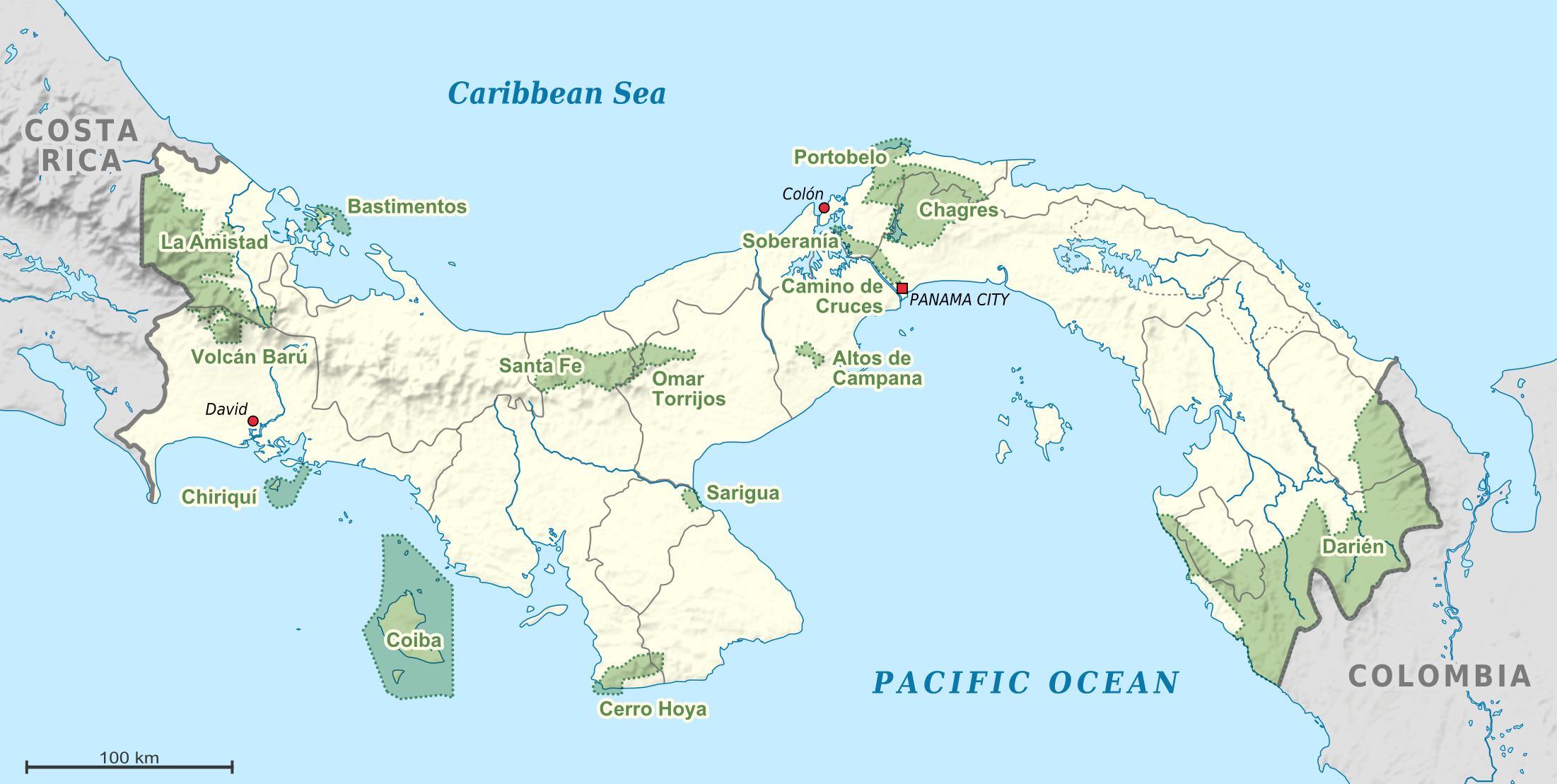
A map of Panama's national parks.

National parks in Panama include:

== National parks ==
- Altos de Campana National Park
- Barro Colorado Island
- Cerro Hoya National Park
- Chagres National Park
- Coiba National Park
- Darién National Park
- Omar Torrijos "El Cope" National Park
- Golfo de Chiriquí National Park
- Isla Bastimentos National Marine Park
- La Amistad International Park
- Las Cruces Trail National Park
- Metropolitan National Park
- Portobelo National Park
- Sarigua National Park
- Soberanía National Park
- Volcan Baru National Park

== See also ==
- Protected areas of Panama
