= Teribe (disambiguation) =

Teribe most often refers to:

- Teribe people, indigenous people of Central America
- Teribe language, a Chibchan language originating in what is now northern Panama
- Teribe River, a river of Panama.
- Teribe is a town and corregimiento in the Changuinola District of Bocas del Toro Province of Panama.
