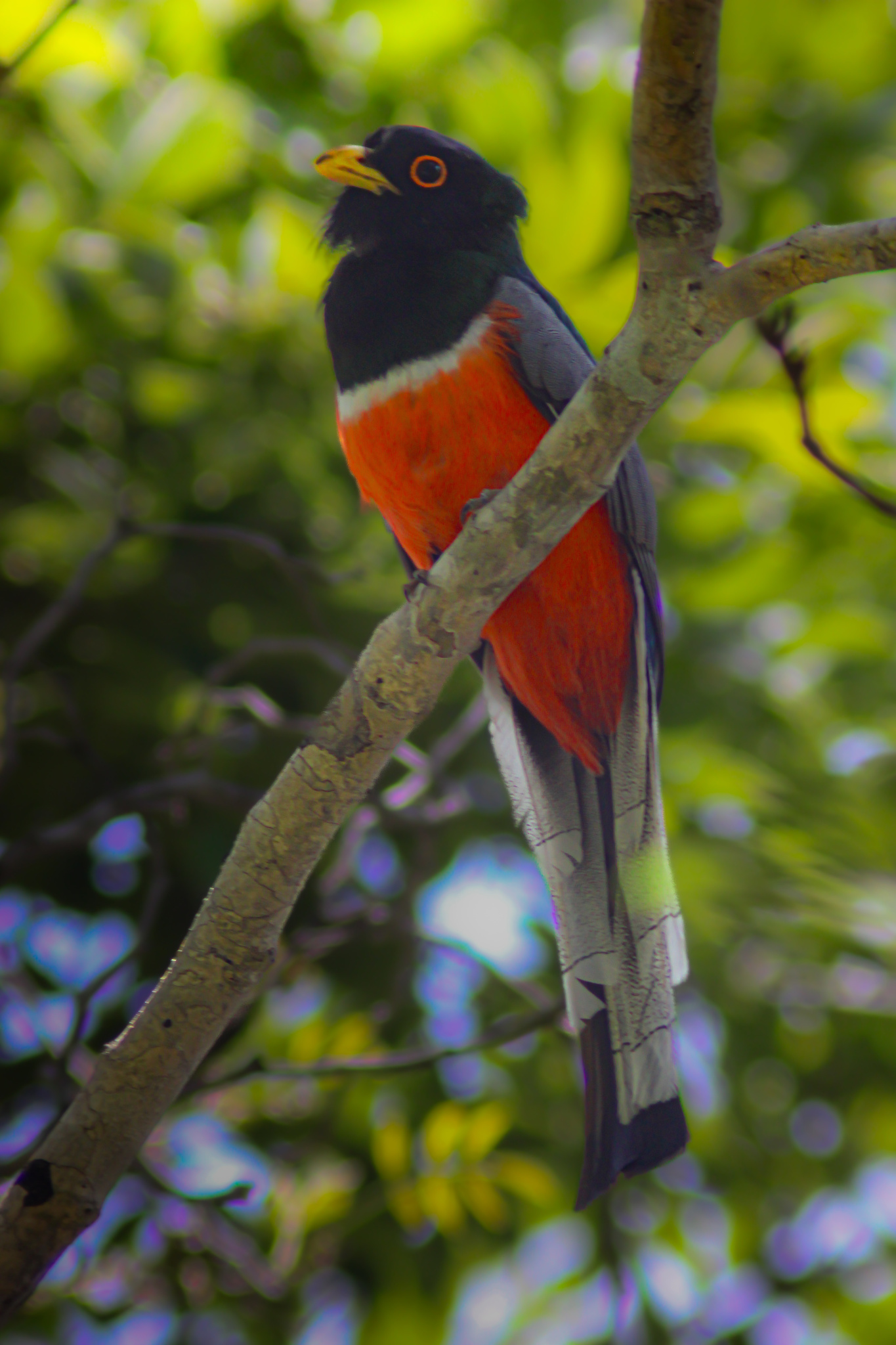
- Adult Male

Conservation status
- Least Concern (IUCN 3.1)

Scientific classification
- Kingdom: Animalia
- Phylum: Chordata
- Class: Aves
- Order: Trogoniformes
- Family: Trogonidae
- Genus: Trogon
- Species: T. ambiguus

Binomial name
- Trogon ambiguus Gould, 1835

= Coppery-tailed trogon =

The coppery-tailed trogon (Trogon ambiguus) is a medium sized bird in the family Trogonidae that was formerly considered conspecific with the elegant trogon (Trogon elegans) before being widely re-split by global taxonomic authorities in 2025. It is found in southeastern Arizona, extreme southwestern New Mexico and much of Mexico either side of the Sierra Madre Occidental. Like other trogons, it is brightly coloured and sexually dimorphic. Adult males have iridescent emerald-green upperparts, a bright red belly, and a coppery-green uppertail. Adult females are a duller greyish-brown with pinkish-red lower belly and a rich copper-brown tail.

The coppery-tailed trogon inhabits arid-to semi-arid woodlands, pine-oak forests, and riparian canyon bottoms, relying primarily on sycamores (Platanus wrightii) for nesting cavities. It feeds on small fruits, berries, and large insects plucked from foliage during brief hovering flights. Monogamous and territorial, pairs nest once per year in abandoned woodpecker holes, with both parents sharing incubation and chick-rearing equally. Although rare at the northern edge of its range in the United States, the species is assessed as "Least Concern" on the IUCN Red List due to its broad distribution and stable overall population.

== Taxonomy ==
The coppery-tailed trogon was formally described and illustrated in 1835 by the English ornithologist John Gould from specimens collected in northern Mexico. He coined the current binomial name, Trogon ambiguus. Gould had described the elegant trogon (Trogon elegans) a year earlier, distinguishing T. ambiguus by its finely dotted outer tail feathers rather than bold barring.

Through the early 20th century, major authorities such as Robert Ridgway (1911) and Charles Cory (1919) treated the coppery-tailed trogon as a species distinct from the elegant trogon (Trogon elegans) of Central America. In 1945, James Lee Peters grouped the two into a single species without a published explanation, followed by the American Ornithologists' Union in 1957 and 1983 doing the same. BirdLife International reinstated Trogon ambiguus as a separate species in 2014 based on morphological differences. Although the American Ornithological Society rejected a proposal to split the species in 2022 due to limited bioacoustic data, global taxonomic authorities (including the IOC World Bird List, AviList, and the eBird/Clements Checklist) formally re-split the coppery-tailed trogon in 2025 based on consistent plumage differences, faster vocal delivery, and geographic isolation north of the Isthmus of Tehuantepec.

1835 hand-coloured lithograph of an adult male by John and Elizabeth Gould

The genus name Trogon derives from the Ancient Greek word trōgōn (τρώγων), meaning "gnawing" or "nibbling". This refers to the serrated cutting edges of the bird's bill, which help it grip fruit and insects. The specific epithet ambiguus is Latin meaning "doubtful" or "uncertain", reflecting early taxonomic uncertainty over whether it represented a distinct species or a subspecies of the elegant trogon.

Molecular phylogenetic evidence indicates that the order Trogoniformes originated in the Old World before dispersing to the Americas, where the New World lineage underwent a rapid evolutionary radiation that produced the modern genus Trogon. Although the genus Trogon originated in South America, phylogenetic evidence shows that the ancestral lineage leading to the coppery-tailed trogon dispersed into Middle America before the full formation of the Isthmus of Panama, diversifying there in geographic isolation. Mitochondrial DNA analysis shows that the coppery-tailed trogon and the elegant trogon are sister taxa with shallow genetic divergence, indicating a relatively recent evolutionary split across the Isthmus of Tehuantepec. Within the genus Trogon, both the coppery-tailed trogon and the elegant trogon belong to a clade including the mountain trogon (Trogon mexicanus), collared trogon (Trogon collaris), masked trogon (Trogon personatus), and orange-bellied trogon (Trogon aurantiiventris).

=== Subspecies ===
Three subspecies are recognised:

- Trogon ambiguus canescens Van Rossem, AJ, 1934 – oak-pine woodland of southeastern Arizona and southwestern New Mexico to northwestern Mexico (Sinaloa)
- Trogon ambiguus ambiguus Gould, J, 1835 – northern Nuevo León and central Tamaulipas westward to Nayarit and southward to Oaxaca (eastern to southern Mexico)
- Trogon ambiguus goldmani Nelson, EW, 1898 – Islas Marías (off western Mexico)

== Description ==
Adult female showing brown colours, white facial bar, and horizontally barred undertail

Like other members of the genus Trogon, the coppery-tailed trogon is brightly coloured and sexually dimorphic. It is a medium-sized bird measuring 28.0–30.5 cm (11.0–12.0 in) in length, weighing 60-78 g (2.1-2.8 oz), and having a wingspan of about 30 cm (1 ft). Its legs and feet are exceptionally small and weak relative to its body size, and it exhibits a heterodactyl toe arrangement, unique to trogons, in which the first and second toes point backward while the third and fourth point forward.

The adult male has distinctive iridescent green plumage with bluish reflections and a bright red belly. The head is emerald green with a black face and throat. It has orange eye rings and a bright yellow bill. A white bar separates an emerald chest from the bright red belly. The wings are grey with darker flight feathers underneath (remiges) and white edges. From above, the long, square tail is metallic green to copper; from below, it is white with black vermiculations, three white bands, and a black terminal band. The adult female is slightly larger than the male and has duller plumage. The head, back, and chest are greyish brown. It has an off-white chest band that separates the greyish-brown chest from a soft grey belly. It has a white eye ring and a white vertical bar that extends down the eye. The lower belly is a pinkish-red. The wings are brown with darker brown flight feathers with white edges. The uppertail is coppery-brown with a thick black terminal band, and the underside of her tail resembles the male's pattern but is white with horizontal black lines. The female’s rich copper-brown tail is what gives the species its name.

Juvenile showing the dull brown plumage, pale belly, and bold white spots on the wing coverts

Juveniles resemble adult females but appear duller overall and lack any red on the belly. Instead, their belly is mottled with grey and white, and bold square spots on their wing coverts. Immature birds in their first-year (formative) plumage look intermediate between juveniles and adults of their respective sex, with young males developing patches of adult green plumage while retaining female-like underparts and juvenile facial markings. Chicks hatch naked and blind between May and August. By 10 to 12 days of age, nestlings develop a coat of dark grey natal down across most of their bodies, though the lower belly remains unfeathered. By the time fledglings leave the nest at 20 to 23 days old, their juvenile plumage has grown in, though their tails are only about one-third of adult length and lengthen rapidly from roughly 2 cm (0.8 in) to over 10 cm (3.9 in) during their first month out of the nest.

First-year male in formative plumage, showing adult green and red feathers alongside retained white-spotted juvenile wing coverts

Like other trogons, the coppery-tailed trogon possesses 10 primaries, 9 secondaries, and 12 tail feathers (rectrices) arranged in a graduated tail. Its distinctive rounded wing profile comes from having short inner primaries contrasted with much longer, strongly curved outer six primaries. In adult birds, the tips of the central tail feathers are noticeably flared. Its body plumage is unusually soft and loosely attached. Young birds undergo a partial moult from autumn into winter that replaces body feathers while keeping most juvenile wing and tail feathers; immature males gradually gain patches of iridescent green and red during this period before acquiring full adult plumage in their second year. Adult coppery-tailed trogons undergo a single complete moult each year, primarily between August and October, and lack a distinct breeding plumage. During incubation, the female's 18 cm (7 in) tail is too long to fit comfortably inside the average 13 cm (5 in) nest cavity, causing the feathers to rub against the wood. By the time the August moult begins, her tail can become so frayed that she sheds all of her tail feathers at once, with a new tail growing back roughly three weeks later.

Within its range, the coppery-tailed trogon closely resembles both the mountain trogon (Trogon mexicanus) and the collared trogon (Trogon collaris). The male mountain trogon can be distinguished by its solid black undertail marked with white spots, a blue-green uppertail, and uniform wings whose primaries lack white edging and do not contrast with the coverts. The female mountain trogon differs from the female coppery-tailed trogon in having a black bill, lacking a white facial bar behind the eye, and showing black patches rather than a black terminal band on the undertail. The male collared trogon is separated by its green uppertail, a black undertail crossed by dense white barring, and coarse black vermiculations across the upperwing coverts. The female collared trogon has a plain face without a white bar, a partly black upper ridge on its bill, an entirely red belly, and a barred undertail lacking white spots.

=== Vocalisations ===
In Mexico, the species is locally referred to as coa, an onomatopoeic name inspired by its repetitive, croaking call, often transcribed as "ko-ah, ko-ah", which resembles the vocalizations of a frog or a wild turkey (Meleagris gallopavo). Unlike most trogons which give soft mellow whistles, the coppery-tailed trogon has a hoarse frog-like sound. Its primary song is a raspy 5-10 notes and is delivered at a much faster pace than that of the closely related elegant trogon. When singing, the bird perches upright with its tail straight down, tilting back its head, and puffing out its chest with each note.

== Distribution and habitat ==
Combined distribution of the coppery-tailed trogon (southeastern Arizona to southern Mexico) and the closely related elegant trogon (Central America); orange indicates breeding range and purple indicates year-round range.

The coppery-tailed trogon's range extends from southeastern Arizona and southwestern New Mexico south across most of Mexico to the Isthmus of Tehuantepec in Oaxaca, including the Tres Marías Islands off the western coast. While most members of the genus Trogon are restricted to the warm, humid tropics, the coppery-tailed trogon is the only species in its genus that tolerates cooler climates, allowing it to reach as far north as the southwestern United States.

The coppery-tailed trogon was first documented breeding in the United States in 1885, when a juvenile male was collected by Lieutenant Harry C. Benson in the Huachuca Mountains of southern Arizona.

In the northern portion of its range, the species is a canyon dweller in pine-oak woodlands, typically near streams, occupying the Atascosa, Santa Rita, Huachuca, and Chiricahua mountain ranges in southeastern Arizona. Multi-scale habitat studies show that while pairs nest almost exclusively inside riparian canyon bottoms lined with mature Arizona sycamores (Platanus wrightii), whose soft wood provides abundant cavities excavated by woodpeckers, they spend a greater proportion of their time foraging in adjacent upland pine-oak and mesquite woodlands. Across both riparian corridors and upland slopes, they favour shaded areas with dense vegetation and abundant undergrowth.

Across Mexico, the species occupies elevations from near sea level up to 2,400 m (7,900 ft) in arid to semi-arid woodlands, thorn scrub, and pine-oak forests, as well as smaller pockets of humid lowland and montane rainforest. Populations are largely sedentary year-round throughout Mexico, except at the northern edge of its distribution in Arizona and much of Sonora, where birds are partial migrants.

At the northern limit of its range in the United States, the coppery-tailed trogon is rare; by the 1980s only roughly 50 breeding pairs were documented across an area exceeding 26,000 km² (10,000 sq mi).

Evidence suggests that coppery-tailed trogons are relatively recent colonizers of Arizona rather than long-established residents. No trogon fossils have been found in the state, and early ornithologists such as Elliott Coues and Henry W. Henshaw described many new bird species during the 1860s and 1870s in the same canyons that the coppery-tailed trogon now inhabits, but they never recorded this brightly coloured and loud bird. In addition, it is characteristic of females and immature males to wander north after the breeding season, providing a natural mechanism for range expansion. Historical records also show that the coppery-tailed trogon expanded its range into Arizona very slowly over several decades rather than all at once. Despite neighbouring mountain ranges being separated by only 40 to 80 km (25 to 50 mi), it took between 33 and 54 years for the birds to gradually disperse from one area to the next.

== Behaviour and ecology ==
The coppery-tailed trogon is a generally quiet and slow-moving bird that perches below the forest canopy with a hunched posture and a tail pointing straight down. Because of its small weak feet, it has very limited agility when perched and often uses brief wing-flutters just to turn around on a branch. Like other trogons, the coppery-tailed trogon is not built for sustained, long-distance flight with its typical flight being slow and undulating. However, its short, rounded wings allow for rapid acceleration when exiting a nest cavity and precise maneuverability through dense forest foliage. It is also an excellent climber. Adults spend considerable time preening and roost at night in the dense pine, oak, and sycamore canopy on canyon slopes. Fledglings will often stretch and bathe in shallow pools on the forest floor.

Coppery-tailed trogons are territorial during the breeding season. Rival males will puff up their bright red chests and advance toward one another with small steps, low calls, and snapping bills.

=== Diet and feeding ===
The coppery-tailed trogon's diet consists of small berries and fruits, supplemented with large arthropods, including beetles, grasshoppers, moths, and butterflies. It spends long stretches perched motionless in the forest while scanning for food. Rather than hopping along branches to forage, it launches from a perch with great aerial control to hover briefly and pick fruits or insects directly from foliage.

=== Breeding ===
Males display courtship by puffing up their red chest feathers, flicking or pumping their tails up and down, following females from perch to perch, and giving low-pitched calls. A very important aspect of courtship is also nest advertisement. Both mates participate in selecting a nest cavity; males perch 15 to 30 m (50 to 100 ft) away, call repeatedly to their partner (averaging around 160 calls per hour), and then enter the cavity repeatedly until the female accepts it.

The coppery-tailed trogon nests in pre-existing tree cavities in either live or dead wood, often utilizing old holes excavated by woodpeckers. Coppery-tailed trogons have a low reproductive rate; they only nest once a year from late March through July, with a typical clutch of two eggs. Unlike most trogons, both mates spend an equal amount of time incubating the eggs, brooding the chicks, and bringing food to the nest (almost entirely insects). Chicks fledge 15 to 17 days after hatching, though they remain dependent on their parents for food for nearly a month afterward. Individuals exhibit strong site fidelity, often returning to the same mountain ranges and canyons.

Suspected and confirmed nest predators include squirrels (Sciurus), gopher snakes (Pituophis catenifer), and ringtails (Bassariscus astutus). Documented predators of adult coppery-tailed trogons include Cooper's hawks (Astur cooperii), mottled owls (Strix virgata), ringtails, sharp-shinned hawks (Accipiter striatus), American goshawks (Astur atricapillus), prairie falcons (Falco mexicanus) and peregrine falcons (Falco peregrinus). Both parents are fierce protectors of their hatchlings and will attack nest predators.

== Conservation ==
The coppery-tailed trogon has been assessed as "Least Concern" by the IUCN Red List since 2014, including its assessments on 17 August 2022.Although the population has not been formally assessed, it is not believed to approach the threshold for "Vulnerable" status because of its large geographic range and apparently stable population trend. While woodlands across its broader range experience roughly 2% deforestation per decade, the rugged, arid canyon habitats this species prefers are generally not targeted by loggers, leaving its overall population relatively unaffected by timber harvest.

Because the species occurs at low densities, is brightly coloured, conspicuous, and depends on healthy riparian canyon woodlands, researchers consider it a useful ecological indicator. Declines in trogon numbers can signal broader environmental stress within southwestern canyon ecosystems.

== Relationship with humans ==
From the late 1890s to the early 1900s, scientific specimen collecting (shooting) was standard ornithological practice, and at least six documented coppery-tailed trogons were shot in Arizona's Huachuca Mountains between 1892 and 1902. Despite this, the species continued to establish itself in the region and was present in nearly every south-facing Huachuca canyon by the 1930s. In 1939, Cornell University ornithologist Arthur A. Allen documented the first active nests of coppery-tailed trogons. Instead of shooting the birds and taking their eggs, he took photographs and audio recordings. His resulting 1944 feature in National Geographic helped shift public interest in the species from specimen hunting toward conservation and wildlife viewing.

Today, the coppery-tailed trogon is one of the most sought-after birds among North American birdwatchers, drawing around 25,000 annual visitors to Arizona’s southwestern mountain canyons. While some territorial males become habituated to observers, human disturbance near active nest cavities can cause pairs to abandon their nests. To minimize stress during breeding season, wildlife agencies and birding groups advise observers to keep a respectful distance from nesting trees and avoid using recorded call playback near active territories.
