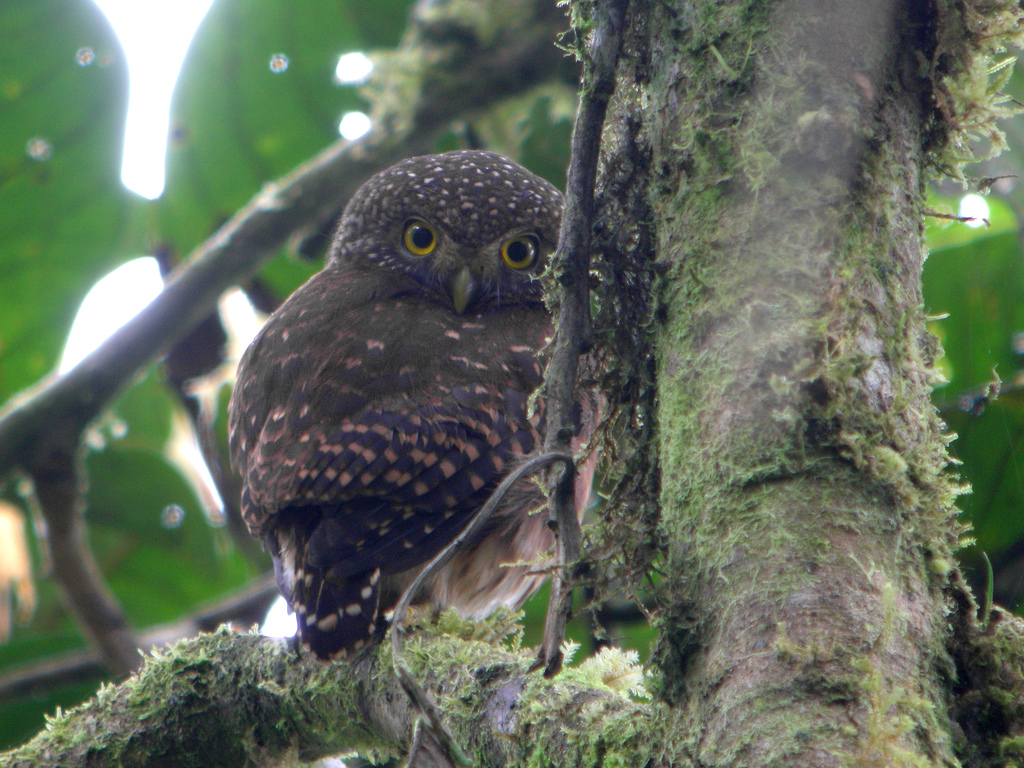

Conservation status
- Vulnerable (IUCN 3.1)
- CITES Appendix II

Scientific classification
- Kingdom: Animalia
- Phylum: Chordata
- Class: Aves
- Order: Strigiformes
- Family: Strigidae
- Genus: Glaucidium
- Species: G. nubicola

Binomial name
- Glaucidium nubicola Robbins & Stiles, 1999
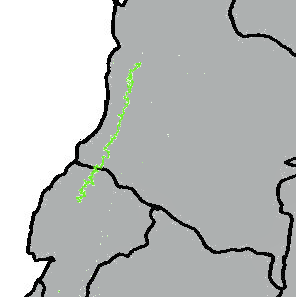
- Distribution of cloud-forest pygmy owl Resident

= Cloud-forest pygmy owl =

Species of owl

The cloud-forest pygmy owl or cloudforest pygmy owl (Glaucidium nubicola) is a short, muscular, small-sized species of owl found throughout the Andes of western Colombia and north-western Ecuador, being confined to cloud forests between 900–2000 m a.s.l. Below this altitudinal range the Central American pygmy owl (Glaucidium griseiceps) occurs; above it, the Andean pygmy owl (Glaucidium jardinii) occurs.

Its epithet nubicola is Latin for "cloud-inhabiting", because this species is restricted to very humid cloud forests.

== Taxonomy and systematics ==
The cloud-forest pygmy owl was first described under its current binomial name by ornithologists Mark B. Robbins and F. Gary Styles in 1999. Glaucidium is the diminutive form of the Greek word "glaux" (γλαύξ), meaning "little owl"; and the species name nubicola is Latin for "cloud-inhabiting".

The cloud-forest pygmy owl belongs to the genus Glaucidium whose lineage includes 26 to 31 species of small owls. All species of Glaucidium are diurnal or crepuscular owls that prey on insects, reptiles and small birds. This genus appertains to the owl family Strigidae. In the past, the cloud-forest pygmy owl was considered to be conspecific with the more widespread Andean pygmy owl (Glaucidium jardinii), which breeds in the humid montane and temperate forest of the Andes.

== Description ==
The cloud-forest pygmy owl is a small owl, 14.5 –16 cm (5.7–6.3 in) in length with a 92.8–96.3 cm (3.7–3.8 in) wingspan. Weight can range from 75.6 to 79.3 g (2.7 to 2.8 oz). The male and female have similar markings and plumage, but as in many birds of prey this pygmy owl may display sexual dimorphism in size, with the female being more than 3% larger and more than 3% heavier than the male. The standard linear measurements are: the tail measures 46.8 mm (1.8 in) and the bill (from cere to tip) measures 11.3 mm (0.4 in). (Note that all these measurements come from only three males and one female of Glaucidium nubicola.)

This presumed sexual dimorphism is referred to as reversed sexual dimorphism (RSD).

The cloud-forest pygmy owl has the typical Neotropical pygmy owl appearance. It is dark brown overall, but there are some individuals with a more rufous-brown wash. Its back, scapulars, upperwing-coverts are darker and its rump is washed dark rufous-brown and spotted white. It has whitish spots on primaries and secondaries which form an indistinct band. Its tail is blackish with five incomplete white bands. The chin, sides of throat and upper chest are white, while sides of the chest are rufous-brown. It has inconspicuous white spots on breast and more distinct streaks on lower underparts. Its rounded head lacks ear tufts. The iris is yellow, the legs are yellow too, and the bill is greenish-yellow.

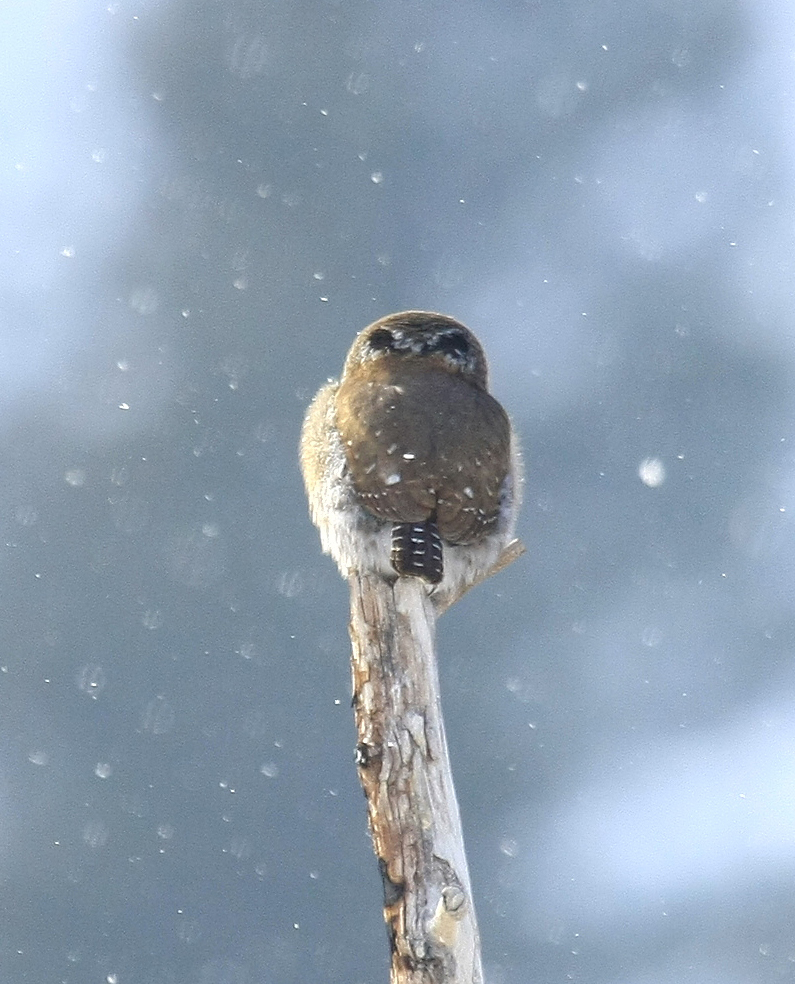
Northern pygmy owl showing "false eyespots" behind head

It has two nape patches, in the form of two spots of dark feathers edged in white; these resemble eyes and are called "false eyespots". These "eyespots" are a remarkable plumage pattern found in many Glaucidium owls and some other owl species that are active during the day. The "false eyespots" presumably fool larger predators and perhaps smaller mobbing birds into thinking that the owl is aware of their presence.

Its facial ruff, and the facial disk that covers it, are smaller and less well-developed than they are in highly nocturnal owl species. Its plumage colours make this species highly cryptic, presumably to allow it to roost undisturbed. It has rounded wings, like other species that hunt from a perch.

The cloud-forest pygmy owl is quite similar to temperate forms of Costa Rican pygmy owl (Glaucidium costaricanum), Andean pygmy owl (G. jardinii) and Yungas pygmy owl (G. bolivianum), but it is heavier and has a shorter tail. Besides, it has minimal or complete lack of pale spotting or barring on the back, sides of the chest and flanks. In contrast with the similar Costa Rican pygmy owl, its "false eyespots" are bordered with white in all non-rufous individuals.

=== Voice ===
The song of the cloud-forest pygmy owl is composed of simple notes best expressed as hollow whistles or toots, like almost all New World Glaucidium species. It is a long series of short whistles, delivered in pairs and occasionally in trios.

This song pattern is shared with the northern pygmy owl (Glaucidium gnoma) and the Costa Rican pygmy owl (G. costaricanum), and serves as a putative synapomorphy that distinguishes the clade of G. nubicola, G. gnoma and G. costaricanum from all other Glaucidium species. Because strigid vocalizations are innate, rather than learned, they provide valuable cues for distinguishing species limits in a family where plumage and other morphological characters are very similar among species.

Besides, the length of notes and spacing of notes (intra-note pauses and inter-note pauses) clearly distinguish the cloud-forest pygmy owl from its relatives the northern pygmy owl and the Costa Rican pygmy owl. For the cloud-forest pygmy owl intra-note pauses (pauses within note pairs) average 207.9 ± 18.0 ms, while inter-note pauses (pauses between a pair of whistles) average 344.8 ± 21.0 ms.

It has been heard warming up its voice mainly in the morning, but it stays active all day. Its song causes intense mobbing reactions of smaller birds.

== Distribution and habitat ==
The cloud-forest pygmy owl is endemic to the Andean portion of the Chocó biogeographic region. Its range extends from Alto de Pisones in Risaralda (Colombia) in the north, to northern Cotopaxi (Ecuador) in the south; with an apparently isolated population in south-west El Oro (Ecuador). This population represents the lower elevation limit for the species (900 m a.s.l.) and its most southerly record up to now.

Juan F. Freile and Diego F. Castro have proposed that current distribution of the cloud-forest pygmy owl is continuous from northern to southern Cotopaxi, and along the Pacific slope in Azuay, El Oro and Loja. This potential distribution comprises roughly 2570 km^{2}.

This pygmy owl inhabits primary or slightly altered cloud forests in mountainous regions of high rainfall and steep slopes. It is not actually restricted to primary forests, and is at least capable of persisting in altered habitats. Its habitat can be of difficult access for humans, but can also be prone to natural fragmentation. Thus, like other species that are tied to cloud forest, it is known only from a very small range.

It is found in low densities in the canopy and middle stratum of forest. Nevertheless, it can descend into the understory for feeding.

== Behavior and ecology ==
In common with other species of pygmy owls, this species is quite diurnal, and consumes both invertebrates and small vertebrates. Nevertheless, owing to its small size and retiring habits — generally being perched in dense evergreen trees — it is not often noticed.

=== Breeding ===
The cloud-forest pygmy owl breeds principally between February and June. This fact allows it to have chicks leaving the nest when there are large quantities of prey in the form of small birds' fledglings. In August 1999 a recently fledged juvenile of cloud-forest pygmy owl was reported in Tandayapa (Ecuador), suggesting that nesting takes place at least until August.

This pygmy owl typically nests in a hole in a tree, but will also use old woodpecker cavities.

=== Feeding ===
The cloud-forest pygmy owl is an ambush predator, hunting its prey almost entirely during the daytime, probably watching from a perch before dropping or gliding down on its victim. This hunting style is also known as "sit-and-wait" or "perch-and-pounce", and is used by many owl species that live in forested habitats.

This species takes a wide range of prey, mainly insects like grasshoppers, crickets, cicadas or bugs; but also small vertebrates like birds and lizards. Species of Glaucidium feed on reptiles to a greater degree than any other strigids.

Flight is the main form of locomotion used during foraging. Presumably its relatively long tail provides it with increased agility for capturing birds in flight.

=== Longevity ===
A team of researchers opportunistically captured and banded an adult in 2008 during a long term study in Reserva Las Tangaras, near Mindo, Pichincha Province, Ecuador. The team recaptured it twice in 2012, showing that the species can live at least five years.

== Conservation status ==
The species is currently classified as vulnerable globally because it is suspected to be undergoing a rapid population decline within its naturally small distribution range, owing to severe ongoing deforestation. In addition, its probable distributional range is well below 5000 km^{2}, and the population size is preliminarily estimated between only 2500 and 9999 individuals, of which 1500-7000 are mature individuals.

It has lost 57% of its global range and 33% of its range in Ecuador. In Colombia less than 55% of its range remains. Therefore, the cloud-forest pygmy owl is also ranked vulnerable in Colombia and vulnerable status has also been suggested for Ecuadorian populations.

=== Threats ===
This range loss is due to current deforestation, with timber extraction probably being its most significant threat. The Chocó region has long been a source of timber, and logging has intensified since the mid-1970s. In western Ecuador, over 85% of forest cover has been lost in the Pacific lowlands and slope. In Colombia, human population growth and deforestation have been slower but they are increasing anyway.

The rapid expansion of the road network in the Chocó, along with infrastructural improvement, are resulting in increased access to previously remote areas. Accordingly, logging, small-scale agriculture (mostly illicit) and gold mining in the Chocó are increasing rapidly. Additionally, intensive agricultural development (especially coca plantations) and cattle farming pose a serious threat to cloud-forest pygmy owl populations.

Unfortunately, the cloud-forest pygmy owl benefits little from existing conservation units, with no records from large protected areas despite the existence of apparently suitable habitat.
