= Anolis pseudopachypus =

Conservation status
- Least Concern (IUCN 3.1)

Scientific classification
- Kingdom: Animalia
- Phylum: Chordata
- Class: Reptilia
- Order: Squamata
- Suborder: Iguania
- Family: Anolidae
- Genus: Anolis
- Species: A. pseudopachypus

Binomial name
- Anolis pseudopachypus Köhler, Ponce, Sunyer, & Batista, 2007

Species of lizard

Anolis pseudopachypus is a species of lizard in the family Dactyloidae. It is a moderately-sized anole for its genus, growing to a maximum snout–vent length of 48 mm (1.9 in). It has a brownish back and dirty-white underside, with greenish limbs and golden-yellow sides. Males have orange-yellow dewlaps with brownish gorgetal scales. The anole is endemic to Panama, where it is found in two disjunct localities in the Serranía de Tabasará mountain range and Fortuna Forest Reserve. It is found in montane rainforests and woodland edges at elevations of 1,560–2,033 m (5,118–6,670 ft). It is classified as being of least concern by the IUCN on the basis of its sufficiently large range and the absence of any declines in its population.

== Taxonomy ==
Anolis pseudopachypus was formally described in 2007 based on an adult male specimen collected from the La Nevera trail in the Serranía de Tabasará mountain range in Panama. The species is named after its resemblance and presumed taxonomic closeness to Anolis pachypus. It has the English common name La Nevera anole and the Spanish common name Anolis de La Nevera. The anole is part of the A. auratus species group. The large genus Anolis is sometimes split into multiple smaller genera, in which case A. pseudopachypus is placed in the genus Norops.

== Description ==
Anolis pseudopachypus is a moderately-sized anole for its genus, growing to a maximum snout–vent length of 48 mm (1.9 in). Males have unicolor orange-yellow dewlaps with brownish gorgetal scales. The back is brownish, while the underside of the body is dirty-white suffused with a grayish hue. The sides are golden-yellow with olive-green splotches. The limbs are bunting-green below and olive-green above. The iris is brick-red.

== Distribution and habitat ==
Anolis pseudopachypus is endemic to Panama, where it occurs in the Ngäbe-Buglé Comarca and Chiriquí Province. It was initially described from the Serranía de Tabasará mountain range, while subsequent surveys have expanded its range by over 50 kilometers to the Fortuna Forest Reserve. Although it has not yet been documented from between these two areas, it likely occurs more widely, both in the Serranía de Tabasará and between its known localities. The species is found at elevations of 1,560–2,033 m (5,118–6,670 ft). It inhabits montane rainforests and woodland edges. The species is frequently encountered sleeping on vegetation up to a meter high.

== Conservation ==
Anolis pseudopachypus is classified as being of least concern by the IUCN on the basis of its sufficiently large range and the absence of any declines in its population. Although it is a somewhat scarce anole, it does not seem to be falling in population and is able to adapt to disturbed habitats. Its Serranía de Tabasará population is threatened by forest fires that destroy its habitat. It occurs in the Fortuna Forest Reserve, a well-protected area that does not suffer from forest fires.
