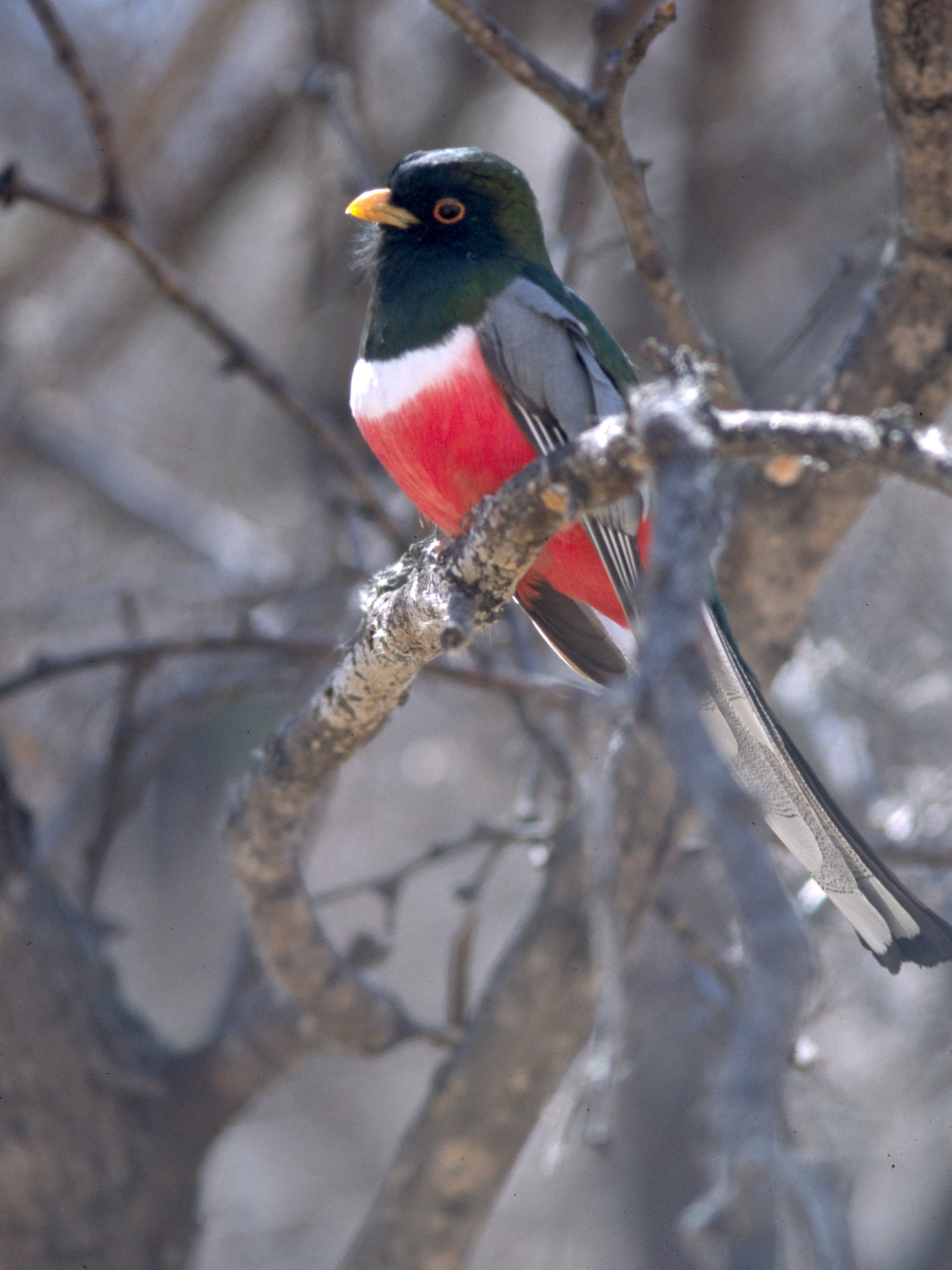
- Male
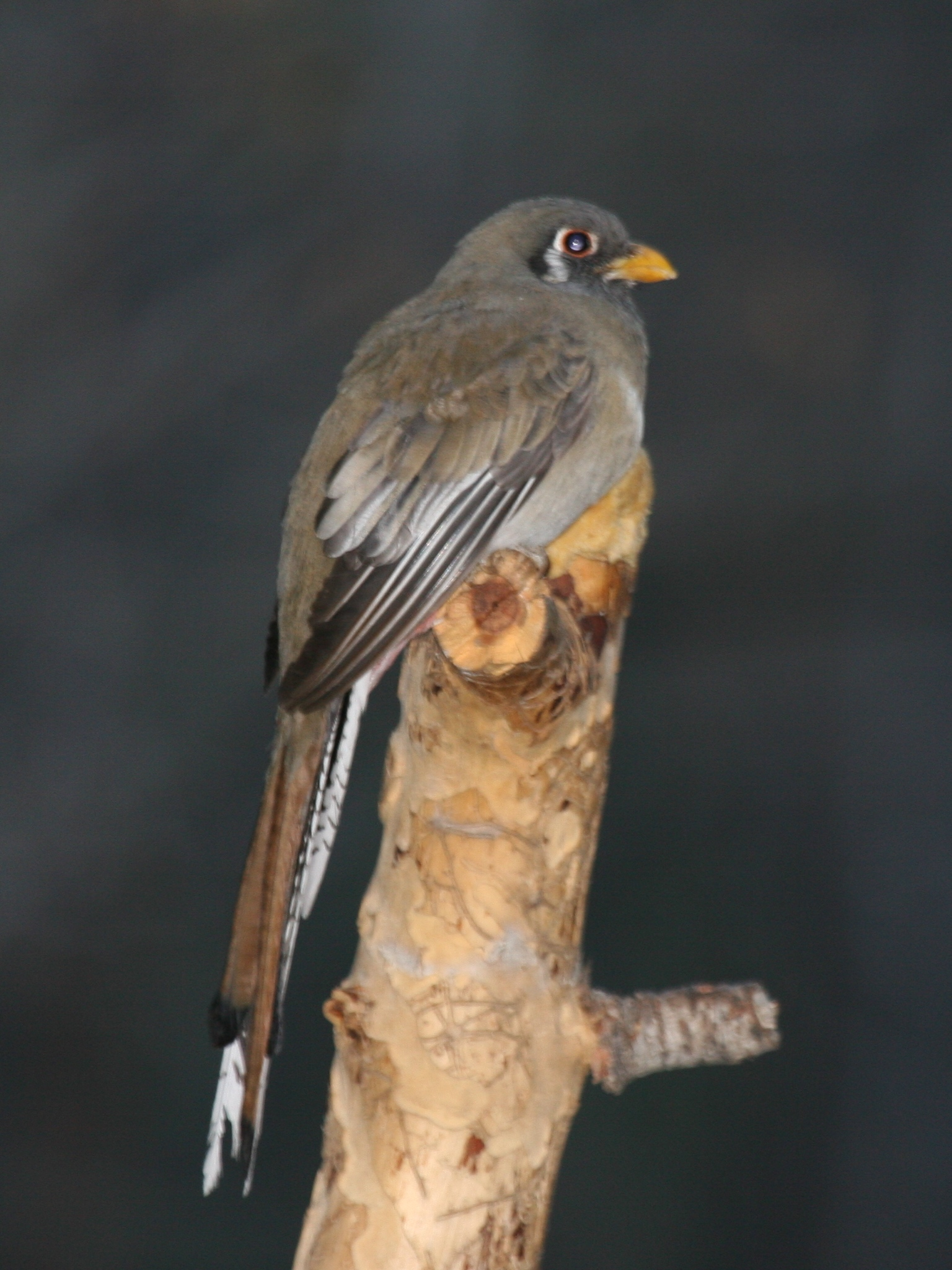
- Female

Conservation status
- Least Concern (IUCN 3.1)

Scientific classification
- Kingdom: Animalia
- Phylum: Chordata
- Class: Aves
- Order: Trogoniformes
- Family: Trogonidae
- Genus: Trogon
- Species: T. elegans

Binomial name
- Trogon elegans Gould, 1834
- Breeding Year-round

= Elegant trogon =

Species of bird

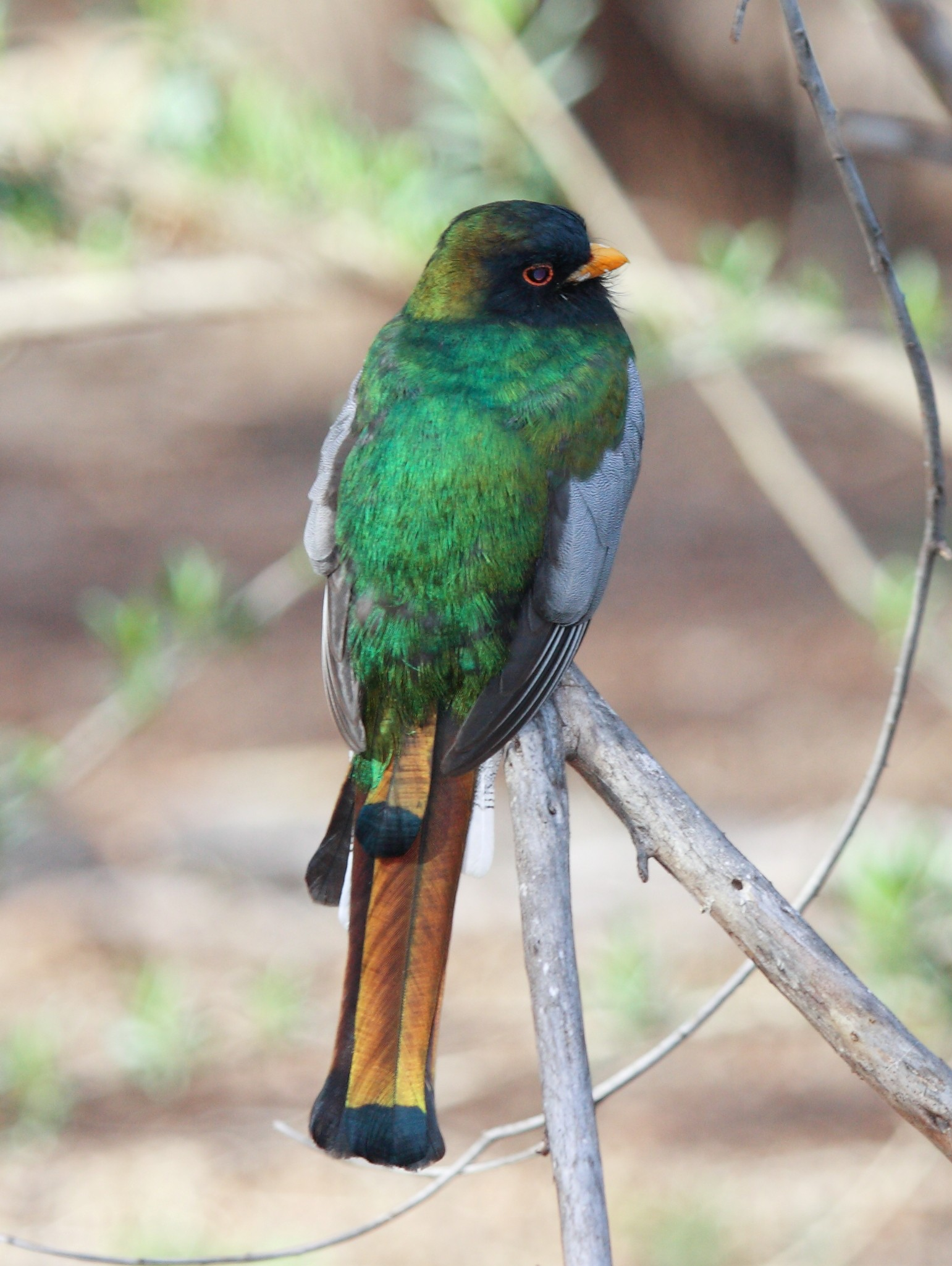
Male

The elegant trogon (Trogon elegans), formerly considered as conspecific with the coppery-tailed trogon, is a species of bird in the trogon family Trogonidae that is native to Central America.

== Taxonomy ==
The elegant trogon was formally described in 1834 by the English ornithologist John Gould based on specimens collected in Guatemala. He coined the current binomial name Trogon elegans.

Two subspecies are recognised:

- Trogon elegans elegans Gould, J, 1834 – southeastern Guatemala
- Trogon elegans lubricus Peters, JL, 1945 – Honduras, Nicaragua, and northwestern Costa Rica

Phylogenetic research suggests a monophyly with T. rufus, T. mexicanus, T. personatus, T. aurantiiventris, and T. collaris. The distribution of their ancestors was restricted to the new world. However, the presence of trogons in the old world has led to debate on their true origin, which remains unknown to this day.

== Description ==
This species is a medium-sized bird, measuring 28–30 centimetres (11–12 in) long and weighing 60–78 grams (2.1–2.8 oz) (average 68 grams (2.4 oz)). Like other trogons, elegant trogons display sexual dimorphism, where males and females have different plumages.

Males are often brightly colored. They have red-orange lower chest and belly and metallic deep green back. They get their old name from the copper shade on their backsides. Their face and throat are a dark black and they have a white band going across the chest. Their upperwings are grey and their long square tipped tail feathers are usually brown on the upper side and white undertail with and black horizontal stripes. The color on the upper part of the tail may very amongst subspecies.

Females and immature males look similar. They have the same patterns as mature males, but they have different colorations. Their coloration is duller, usually a brownish grey, and they have a white ring around their eyes.

The usual call is a croaking "co-ah co-ah co-ah". The trogon will also include some chattering notes. Males tend to be more vocal than females. In males, the frequency of calls does not vary according to the seasons, but females call more often during incubation than during feeding season.

== Distribution and habitat ==
Along with the eared quetzal, it is the northernmost species of trogon in the world. The species is endemic to Central America, ranging from Guatemala in the south as far north as the mountains of southeast Arizona. Elegant trogons are short distance migrators, usually only getting as north as Arizona, where they spend the breeding season. The most northerly populations of the subspecies T. e. ambiguus are partially migratory, and the species is occasionally found as a vagrant in southeasternmost and western Texas. It is a resident of the lower levels of semi-arid open woodlands and forests.

The elegant trogon is fond of dry, arid woodlands. It can be found in pine forests, deciduous forests, second growth forests and around scrubs. The elegant trogon is not fond of humid regions, and chooses to live on hillsides near cliff edges.

In Arizona, they are present in canyons covered with riparian and edge vegetation. Plants such as junipers, oaks, sycamores, and Pinus edulis can be a good indication of suitability for the trogon.

== Behavior ==
Interactions between individuals are not rare. Research found that other than producing calls, tail movement is also a method of communication among individuals. Tail rising could be a sign of dominance or aggression to communicate status, or associated with mating. Tail raising is also used as an alarm or deterrent to let a predator know that it has been spotted.

=== Food and feeding ===
The elegant trogon is a frugivore and insectivore, meaning they consume fruits and insects. Their broad bills and weak legs reflect their diet and arboreal habits. Their diet consists of grapes, cherries, figs, chokecherry, and buckthorn as well as grasshoppers, mantids, caterpillars, moths and beetles. Very occasionally it will also prey upon small vertebrates, usually lizards.

Although their flight is fast, they are reluctant to fly any distance. They typically perch upright and motionless. To hunt their prey, they remain motionless on a perch, then jump into flight. To grab fruits, they will hover over the berries to pluck them

=== Breeding ===
It nests 2–6 metres (7–20 ft) high in an unlined shallow cavity, usually selecting an old flicker hole, with a typical clutch of two to three eggs. Incubation periods last an average of 17 days with both parents taking turns to incubate.

Elegant trogons display biparental care, where both the males and females are responsible of taking care of their offspring. Both parents take responsibility for delivering food to their young. Usually, they would offer insects, rather than fruits. Both parents feed their offspring until a month after they fledge. Once that happens, the adults will split their broods, with males taking the males and females taking the females.

== Conservation ==
The elegant trogon is listed as endangered in the state of New Mexico. It prefers to live in conditions that would favor the presence of pine oak woodlands and local water making it particularly susceptible to disturbance.

However, according to the IUCN red list, the elegant trogon is listed as being of least concern, as of 2020. Although population trends are declining, there is no sign that the species in threatened or endangered in most of its habitat.
