= Naso people =

Indigenous people of northwestern Panama and parts of Costa Rica

Naso Teribe/Térraba
Naso
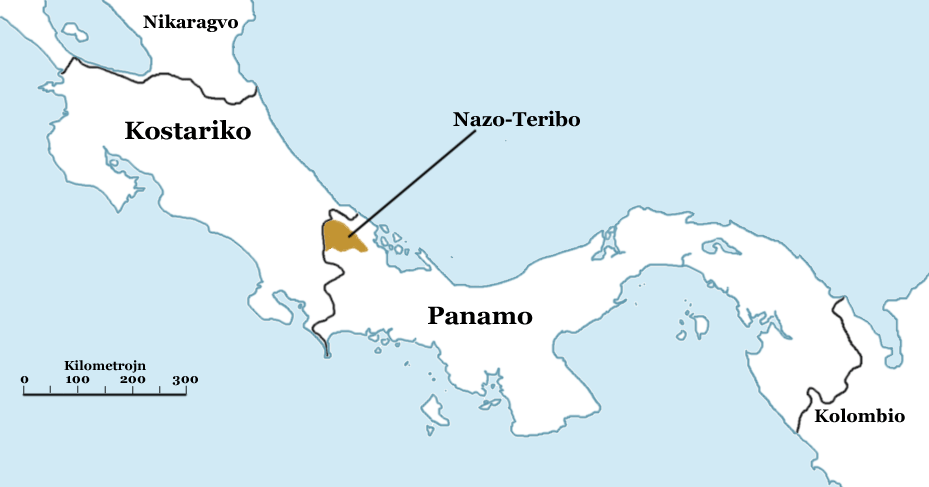
- Location of Naso people in Panama.

Total population
- 3,005

Regions with significant populations
- Costa Rica, Panama

Languages
- Naso, Spanish

Related ethnic groups
- Boruca, Bribri

The Naso or Teribe people (also Tjër Di) are an Indigenous people of Panama and Costa Rica. They primarily live in northwest Panama in the Bocas del Toro Province and Naso Tjër Di Comarca as well as in southern Costa Rica in the Puntarenas Province. Some individuals can also be found in the Limón Province of Costa Rica. There are roughly 3,500 people who belong to the Naso people. It is one of the few Indigenous peoples currently governed through a monarchy.

== History ==
The Naso people have traditionally occupied the mountainous jungle regions that now form the Naso Tjër Di Comarca where they continue to identify with the lands along the river that became known in the Spanish speaking world as the Teribe or Tjër Di in Naso. Di means ‘water’ and Tjër is their mythical “Grand-Mother” who was endowed by God with the secrets of botanical medicine. Until as recently as three or four generations ago the Naso people led a remarkably autonomous existence. Dispersed among their clans and homesteads, and geographically isolated from most of the world, the Naso developed and nurtured their cultural self-sufficiency through the idiom and the institution of the family.

== Language ==
The Naso people speak Naso, although all known speakers are bilingual in Spanish to some degree.

== Economy ==
The Naso people are for the most part subsistence farmers who supplement their earnings with the sale of the agricultural products (cocoa, oranges, plantains, etc.), animals (pigs, chickens, ducks, etc.), lumber (Cordia alliodora, Cedrela odorata, etc.) and some handicrafts which they transport to the relatively nearby city of Changuinola (population 30,000, two hours down river by raft or dugout canoe). While the Naso are isolated in geographic terms and receive few visitors to their communities, they are for the most part bilingual (Naso and Spanish), wear Western clothing, and many among them have converted to evangelical Protestant Christianity. The Naso people in Costa Rica have been successful in gaining United Nations financial support to build tourism facilities including hostel/cabin housing with plumbing and improvement to trails.

== Lands ==
The enormous scientific, hydroelectric and eco-tourism potential of the Naso people’s ancestral territory has attracted considerable international and national interest. Beginning in the 1980s the Government of Panama transferred large sections of the region to its own system of protected areas (Palo Seco National Forest (BBPS) and La Amistad International Park (PILA)). In the year 2005, three major conservation and development projects were proposing to significantly reorganize local land use activities. These included a new law to recognize Naso territorial rights and jurisdiction in the Panamanian National Assembly, a World Bank-funded Biological Corridor project (CBMAP) promoting sustainable development in Indigenous communities and protected areas, and a hydroelectric project sponsored by a Colombian utility company (Empresas Públicas de Medellín).

In Costa Rica, Térraba lands are threatened by the Diquís Dam project, which would flood 10 percent of the land including important sacred sites and which would force the relocation of the approximately 600 Indigenous Naso who live in the country.

== Politics ==
The tribe is governed by a monarch. The former tradition of succession would follow from the king to his brother, to the older son of the previous king. Since the 1980s, succession is based on the vote of the adult population. Typically, when there is a sense within the community that there is dissatisfaction with the current monarch, another member of the royal family may choose to stand for a public vote to see if they can replace the current monarch. In 2004, King Tito was deposed following his approval of a hydroelectric scheme on the Bonyic River which traverses Naso territory. He was deposed in a civil uprising in the capital, Sieyic, and forced into exile. His uncle Valentín was then considered the King of Naso by the majority of the tribe. As of June 2026, the current recognized King of Naso is Ardinteo Santana Torres.

=== List of Monarchs ===
- Bass Lee Santana
- Santiago Santana
- Santiago Santana (son)
- Chalee Santana
- Francisco Santana
- Lázaro Santana - (? - 1973)
- Simeón Santana - (1973–1979)
- Manuel Aguilar - (1979 - April 25, 1982)
- Rufina Santana - (April 25, 1982 - July 30, 1988)
- César Santana - (July 30, 1988 - May 31, 1998)
- Tito Santana - (May 31, 1998 - 2011)
  - Valentín Santana - (May 30, 2004 - 2011)
- Reynaldo Alexis Santana (2011 - July 31, 2023)
- Ardinteo Santana Torres (July 31, 2023 - )

== Culture ==
The Térraba describe themselves as a matriarchal community. They pride themselves on their rich agriculture and their independence.

Most of the inhabitants in Panama speak the native language, although the majority also know Spanish. Very few of the Naso people adhere to Roman Catholicism. The Seventh-day Adventist Church, is very important. The traditional God is Sibö, who is a supreme God and creator. Most Naso live in elevated wooden houses, with thatched or zinc-coated roofing.

In Costa Rica, few native Naso speakers remain, and those who do are mainly elders. Intermarriage between the Costa Rican and Panamanian groups has brought some fluent speakers to live in the Costa Rican territories. As of 2012, the community in Costa Rica has brought in a teacher from Panama to reintroduce the language in the village schools.

== See also ==
- Bokota people
- Indigenous peoples of Panama
- Naso Tjër Di Comarca
- Térraba River
- Teribe River

== Notes ==
- Arroyo, Victor Manuel. “Lenguas Indígenas Costarricenses.” San José: Editorial Costa Rica, 1966.
- Heyerdahl, Thor. “Notes on the Pre-European Coconut Groves on Cocos Island in (Reports of the) Norwegian Archaeological Expedition to Easter Island and the East Pacific,” Vol. 2. London: George Allen and Unwin Ltd., 1966.
- Instituto de Estudios de las Tradiciones Sagradas de Abia Yala, I. 2001. Narraciones Teribes: Nasoga Laiwãk. Vol. 7. Textos Sagrados. San José, C.R.: Fundación Coordinadora de Pastoral Aborigen.
- Lines, J.A. “Reciente hallazgo arquelógico evidencia que la isla del Coco estuvo habitada en los tiempos prehistóricos.” San José: Diario de Costa Rica, May 12, 1940.
- Meléndez, Carlos. “Costa Rica: Tierra y poblamiento en la colonia.” San José: Editorial Costa Rica, 1978.
- Oviedo, Gonzalo Fernández de. “Historia General y Natural de las Indias,” Tomo V, in “Biblioteca de Autores Españoles.” Madrid, 1959.
- Paiement, Jason. 2009. The Tiger and the Turbine: Indigenous Rights and Resource Management in the Naso Territory of Panama. VDM Verlag. ISBN 978-3-639-14087-3.
