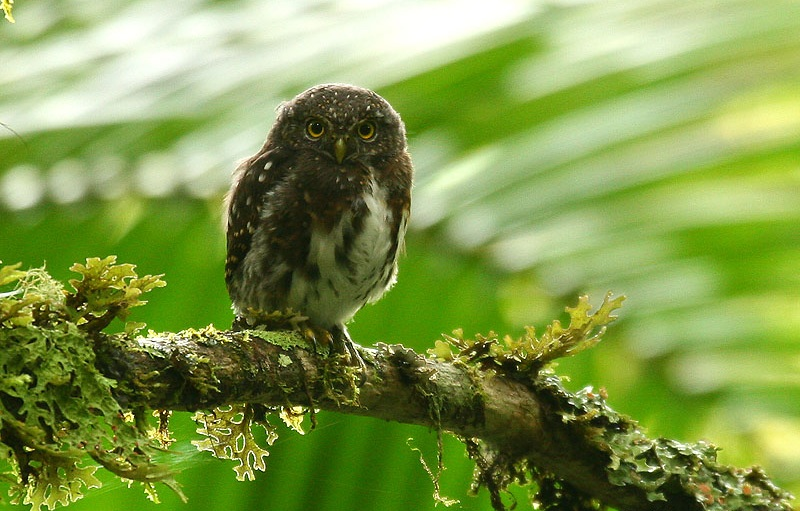
- Savegre Lodge, near San Gerardo, Costa Rica
- Costa Rican Pygmy Owl (Glaucidium costaricanum) call in Fortuna Forest Reserve, Panama

Conservation status
- Least Concern (IUCN 3.1)
- CITES Appendix II

Scientific classification
- Kingdom: Animalia
- Phylum: Chordata
- Class: Aves
- Order: Strigiformes
- Family: Strigidae
- Genus: Glaucidium
- Species: G. costaricanum

Binomial name
- Glaucidium costaricanum Kelso, L, 1937
- Distribution of Costa Rican pygmy owl Resident

= Costa Rican pygmy owl =

Species of owl

The Costa Rican pygmy owl (Glaucidium costaricanum) is a small "typical owl" in subfamily Surniinae. It is found in Costa Rica and Panama.

== Taxonomy and systematics ==
Initially, the Costa Rican pygmy owl was described as a subspecies of the Andean pygmy owl (G. jardinii); in 2000, the North American Classification Committee (NACC), of what was then the American Ornithologists' Union (now the American Ornithological Society), accepted it as a separate species, with other taxonomic systems following-suit. The Costa Rican pygmy owl is more closely related to the northern pygmy owl complex (G. gnoma sensu lato) than to the Andean. The species is monotypic.

== Description ==
The Costa Rican pygmy owl is around 14.5 to 17 cm (5.7 to 6.7 in) long, with males weighing about 53 to 70 g (1.9 to 2.5 oz), while the larger females weigh as much as 99 g (3.5 oz). Adults have two color morphs; one is mostly brown and the other is rufous. The head and upper body parts are a basal color with lighter, paler spots; the tail is the same color, with four white bands and a white tip. The nape has a pair of blackish spots with pale borders that resemble "eyes" on the back of the head. The breast and belly are white and the flanks are the basal color. The facial disc is the basal color, with narrow buff and white marks, while the eyes and feet are yellow, the maxilla greenish yellow, and the mandible is a light brown with a yellow tip.

== Distribution and habitat ==
The Costa Rican pygmy owl is typically found, at some elevation, within the Cordillera Central and Cordillera de Talamanca of Costa Rica, and (patchily) into western Panama, where it inhabits the canopy and edges of humid montane oak and evergreen forests. In its native Costa Rica, the species ranges from about 900 to 3,000 m (3,000 to 9,800 ft) above sea level, on the Caribbean slope, and from 1,200 to 3,000 m (3,900 to 9,800 ft) on the Pacific slope.

== Behavior ==
=== Movement ===
The Costa Rican pygmy owl is a year-round resident throughout its range.

=== Feeding ===
The Costa Rican pygmy owl forages both day and night. It hunts from a low perch in dense foliage and takes prey in "a short, swift dash". If the target is missed, the bird typically returns to the perch rather than pursuing. Its diet has not been defined in detail but is known to include birds, small mammals and other vertebrates, and large arthropods. Like other pygmy owls, they swish their tails from side to side when agitated.

=== Breeding ===
The Costa Rican pygmy owl's breeding phenology is not well known. It nests in naturally occurring tree crevices and holes, and may potentially repurpose the disused nests of woodpeckers or other tree-dwelling birds. Average clutch sizes are not certain, though one nest found in March 2020 contained three eggs.

=== Vocalization ===
The Costa Rican pygmy owl's song is "a long series of clear, unmodulated toots in an irregular rhythm". The toots can be in pairs, in a series of three pairs, or in a continuous series of single notes. When excited, it gives a faster, higher-pitched series of five toots.

== Status ==
The IUCN has assessed the Costa Rican pygmy owl as being of Least Concern. Though its population size is not known, it is believed to be stable. No specific threats have been identified. It is considered rare in Panama and rare to locally fairly common in Costa Rica. "Human activity has little short-term direct effect on [the] Costa Rican Pygmy-Owl, other than the local effects of habitat destruction."
