= Astrothelium megacrypticum =

Scientific classification
- Kingdom: Fungi
- Division: Ascomycota
- Class: Dothideomycetes
- Order: Trypetheliales
- Family: Trypetheliaceae
- Genus: Astrothelium
- Species: A. megacrypticum

Binomial name
- Astrothelium megacrypticum Lücking, M.P.Nelsen & N.Salazar (2016)
- Type locality: Altos de Campana National Park, Panama

Species of lichen-forming fungus

Astrothelium megacrypticum is a species of crustose lichen-forming fungus in the family Trypetheliaceae. The lichen forms an olive-green crusty patch on tree bark with a distinctively bumpy, gall-like surface. Its reproductive structures are completely hidden within the lichen body and are unusual in that each spore sac contains only a single, exceptionally large ascospore rather than the typical eight spores. The species is known only from lower mountain rainforest in Panama, where it grows on roadside trees.

== Taxonomy ==
Astrothelium megacrypticum was described as a new species in 2016 by Robert Lücking, Matthew Nelsen, and Noris Salazar-Allen. The type was collected in Panama (Panamá Province), in Altos de Campana National Park west of Panama City, where it was found growing on bark along an access road through submontane rainforest at about 500–600 m (1,600–2,000 ft) elevation.

The species is distinguished from the similar A. longisporum by its asci (spore-bearing sacs), which contain a single ascospore rather than eight, and by its larger ascospores. The specific epithet megacrypticum refers to the combination of cryptic (externally hidden) perithecia and exceptionally large ascospores. The species is also compared with A. colombiense, which shares solitary perithecia and large, muriform ascospores, but differs in having smaller spores, apically placed ostioles, and lacking the gall-like thallus bumps seen in A. megacrypticum.

== Description ==
The thallus is crustose and grows on bark, forming a continuous patch up to about 10 cm (4 in) across. It is olive-green and uneven to bumpy, with irregularly scattered, gall-forming bumps about 1–2 mm in diameter. In cross section, the thallus has a thick, cartilage-like cortex, a thick photobiont layer positioned near the surface (with a scalloped upper boundary against the cortex), and a massive medulla embedded within the modified outer bark. The medulla is densely encrusted with numerous small, gray crystals.

The perithecia (flask-shaped fruiting bodies) are solitary and completely immersed in the thallus, so that they are usually not visible from the outside except where expelled spores accumulate near the ostiole. The ostiole is eccentric (off-center) to lateral and difficult to detect, and the perithecia are more or less spherical, about 0.7–1.0 mm wide and up to 1 mm high. The excipulum is carbonized (blackened) and about 30–50 μm thick, with an outer covering of amorphous orange-brown tissue. The hamathecium consists of densely branched, net-like paraphyses embedded in a gelatinous matrix that is strongly filled with large oil droplets (IKI-), and the ostiolar channel is similarly inspersed. Each ascus contains a single, hyaline ascospore that is oblong-ellipsoid and densely muriform (divided into many small compartments by internal walls), measuring about 250–350 × 40–60 μm (IKI-). No lichen substances were detected in chemical tests.

== Habitat and distribution ==
The species is known from lower mountain (submontane) rainforest in Altos de Campana National Park in Panama, where it grows on the bark of exposed roadside trees along a gravel access road. The type locality is about 50 km (31 mi) west of Panama City, near the town of Capira.

An additional collection has been reported from the same national park and general locality. Based on records available at the time of publication, A. megacrypticum is known only from Panama.
