= Naso Tjër Di Comarca =

Indigenous territory in Panama

Naso Tjër Di
- Comarca indígena
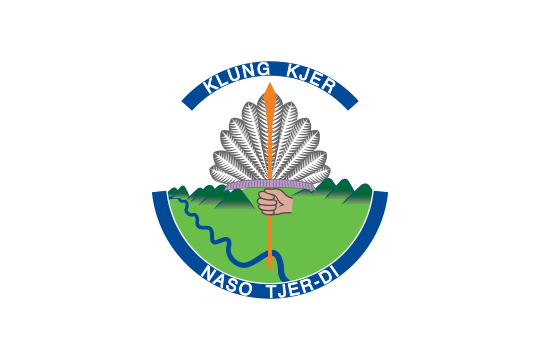
- Flag

- Country: Panama
- Capital: Sieyic

Government
  - Type: Elective Monarchy
  - King: Ardinteo Santana Torres
  - Council: Naso General Council

Area
  - Total: 1,606.16 km^{2} (620.14 sq mi)
- Time zone: UTC-5 (ETZ)

Naso Tjër Di is a landlocked Indigenous region in Panama, located in the extreme northwest of the country, on the banks of the Teribe River and adjacent to the border with Costa Rica. About 5,000 people, mainly Naso, live in the comarca.

The region was created on December 4, 2020, from the territory of Changuinola, in the province of Bocas del Toro. It has an area of 1,606.16 square kilometres (620.14 sq mi), of which 91% (1468.63 km^{2)} is protected within the La Amistad International Park and the Palo Seco Forest Reserve.

The name translates as "I am from the grandmother's river".

== History ==
The Naso people, through their king, have been claiming in recent years the formation of an Indigenous region, seeing that the other Indigenous ethnic groups in Panama had their own, and also as a way to protect the cultural identity of that ethnicity.

On October 25, 2018, the National Assembly of Panama approved Bill 656 that created the comarca. However, the president at that time, Juan Carlos Varela, vetoed it on December 14 of that same year, citing the concerns from environmental groups that an indigenous region cannot be created in a protected area and that it could be in conflict with Articles 4 and 120 of the Constitution of Panama.

The case was taken to the Supreme Court of Justice of Panama, where on November 12, 2020, it issued a ruling indicating that the decree does not conflict with the Constitution and also added that the Naso people are one of the seven Indigenous peoples that ancestrally have inhabited Panama, giving green light to the creation of the comarca.

On December 4, 2020, the then president of Panama, Laurentino Cortizo Cohen, sanctioned Law 188, thus allowing the creation of the new region.

In 2022, the process to draft the Organic Charter of the Naso Tjër Di Comarca began with the General Council's approval of the project to Strengthen the Indigenous Agenda of Panama (FAIP). This charter serves as a foundational document that outlines the structural components of the foundation, including its functions and guiding principles.

== Administrative divisions ==
The capital of the comarca is the community of Sieyic, where the Naso king is settled.

The comarca is made up of the special district Naso Tjër Di, and in turn is divided into three corregimientos:

- Teribe
- San San Drui
- Bonyik

== Monarchs ==
Name	Lifespan	Reign start	Reign end	Notes	Family	Image
Reynaldo Alexis Santana		2011	31 July 2023	Suspended after being convicted of raping a minor in 2016	Santana	
Ardinteo Santana Torres		31 July 2023	incumbent	Interim king for 5 years	Santana	
