= Provinces of Panama =

First-level administrative divisions of Panama

Provinces and Indigenous regions of Panama Provincias y regiones indígenas de Panamá (Spanish)
- Category: Unitary state
- Location: Republic of Panama
- Number: 10 provinces (including 2 corregimiento-level indigenous regions); 4 indigenous regions (provincial level)
- Populations: Provinces: 54,235 (Darién) – 1,439,575 (Panamá); Indigenous regions: 12,358 (Emberá-Wounaan) – 212,084 (Ngäbe-Buglé)
- Areas: Provinces: 2,362.9 km^{2} (912.3 sq mi) (Herrera) – 12,402.7 km^{2} (4,788.7 sq mi) (Darién); Indigenous regions: 1,606.2 km^{2} (620.2 sq mi) (Naso Tjër Di) – 6,829.5 km^{2} (2,636.9 sq mi) (Ngäbe-Buglé)
- Government: Provincial governments Indigenous regional governments National government
- Subdivisions: Districts

Panama is divided into ten provinces (Spanish: provincias) and four provincial-level indigenous regions (Spanish: comarcas indígenas, often shortened to comarcas). The most recently established province is Panamá Oeste Province on 1 January 2014, and the most recently established indigenous region is Naso Tjër Di Comarca on 4 December 2020.

There are also two indigenous regions within provinces that are considered equivalent to a corregimiento (municipality).

== List of provinces ==
Flag	Province	Capital	Area (km^{2})	Population (2023 census)	Population (2010 census)	Population density (2023, per km^{2})
	Bocas del Toro	Bocas del Toro	4,654.0	159,228	125,461	34.2
	Chiriquí	David	6,584.2	471,071	416,873	71.5
	Coclé	Penonomé	4,943.0	268,264	233,708	54.3
	Colón	Colón	4,605.0	281,956	241,928	61.2
	Darién	La Palma	12,402.7	54,235	48,378	4.4
	Herrera	Chitré	2,362.9	122,071	109,955	51.6
	Los Santos	Las Tablas	3,812.0	98,466	89,592	25.8
	Panamá	Panama City	8,478.5	1,439,575	1,249,032	169.8
	Panamá Oeste	La Chorrera	2,892.1	653,665	464,038	226.2
	Veraguas	Santiago de Veraguas	10,597.5	259,791	226,991	24.5

== Indigenous regions (comarcas indígenas) ==
=== Provincial level ===
Flag	Comarca	Capital	Area (km^{2})	Population (2023 census)	Population (2010 census)
	Emberá-Wounaan	Unión Chocó	4,365.5	12,358	10,001
	Guna Yala	Gaigirgordub	2,307.6	32,016	33,109
Nasi Tjer Di Indigenous Region	Naso Tjër Di	Sieyic	1,606.2		
	Ngäbe-Buglé	Llano Tugrí	6,829.5	212,084	156,747

=== Corregimiento-level ===
Flag	Comarca	Province	Area (km^{2})	Population (2023 census)	Population (2010 census)
	Guna de Madungandí	Panamá	2,127.2	7,647	4,271
	Guna de Wargandí	Darién	952.2	2,781	1,914

== See also ==
- ISO 3166-2:PA
- List of provinces and Indigenous regions of Panama by Human Development Index
