= Azuero Peninsula =

Peninsula in southern Panama

Coordinates: 7°40′N 80°35′W

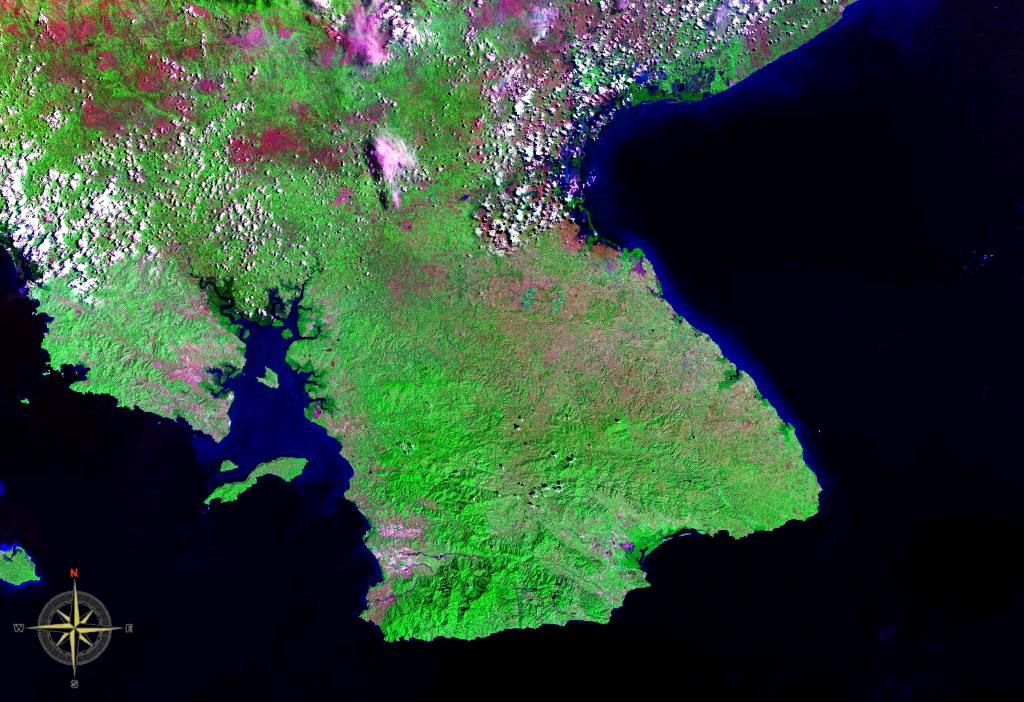
The Azuero Peninsula seen from space (false color)

The Azuero Peninsula (Spanish: Península de Azuero) is a large peninsula in southern Panama. It is surrounded by the Pacific Ocean in the south; the Pacific and Gulf of Montijo to the west, and by the Gulf of Panama in the east. The peninsula is effectively divided into two regions; the Western Azuero and the Eastern Azuero, as no serviceable roads join the two peninsula regions past the Pan-American Highway.

The Eastern Azuero Peninsula is known for baseball and is also a center of activity during the annual carnaval (carnival), with Las Tablas being the hub. Pedasi is a small fishing town with sport fishing.

The Western Azuero Peninsula is known for its cattle ranching, farming, fishing, sunsets and beaches.

Tourism has begun to increase in the area both for the aforementioned sport fishing, surfing and for the local charm of cities like Chitré, Las Tablas, and Pedasi. Due to a rise in tourism, real estate development has begun. The area enjoys some of the best weather in Panama being in a region known as the "Arco Seco" (dry arc).

== Geography ==
The peninsula is divided into three provinces: Herrera Province and Los Santos Province are located entirely within the peninsula, while the southern portion of Veraguas Province forms the western side of the peninsula. Most of the people live on the east coastal region. The southern tip is sparsely populated, and western area (the Veraguas area) is just now opening up to development. The largest towns are Chitré, the capital of Herrera, and Las Tablas. The main road to the eastern Azuero peninsula connects to the Pan-American Highway in Divisa and runs south along the eastern side of the peninsula. The road to the western Azuero connects to the Pan-American just east of Santiago.

Punta Mariato on the western tip of the peninsula is the southernmost point on the mainland of Central America. The Frailes del Sur Islands lie 7 km off the south coast.

== History ==
The Azuero region was one of the first parts of Panama to be settled more than 10,000 years ago, and the area in the north of the peninsula was cultivated thousands of years before the arrival of the Spaniards.

== Environment ==
Its long history of cultivation and grazing has had a negative impact on the environment, resulting in what is sometimes called the Sarigua desert in the northeastern area of the peninsula, even though it is not technically a desert. Along the coast there are areas of mangroves and just inland is a dry coastal forest called Albina. The Azuero is one of the most heavily deforested parts of Panamá, although sustainable land management systems such as silvopastoral grazing are emerging.

In the extreme south, Cerro Hoya is a national park and home of most of the remaining jungle habitat in the Azuero region. Isla Canas, a coastal island connected via a sandbar to the peninsula, is used by a large number of sea turtles to lay their eggs each year.

== Geology ==
The geological setting of the Azuero Peninsula is made up of basaltic lava flows, basalt units interbedded with chert, sheeted dikes, gabbros and granodiorites. Most of these lithologies belong to the Azuero Melange which formed because of two seamounts that were accreted onto the Caribbean Plate along a subduction margin. The subduction sequence started through the formation of the Caribbean Large Igenous Province (CLIP). The CLIP formed through the Galápagos Hotspot deforming and breaking up the Farallon Plate between 90 and 70 Ma. This process helped to spread the seafloor and allowing for subduction to occur along the Caribbean Plate.
