= Teribe (town) =

- Corregimiento and town
- Interactive map of Teribe
- Location within Panama
- Coordinates: 9°24′N 82°30′W
- Country: Panama
- Comarca: Naso Tjër Di
- District: Naso Tjër Di
- Established: January 19, 1998

Area
  - Land: 858.5 km^{2} (331.5 sq mi)

Population (2010)
  - Total: 2,578
  - Density: 3/km^{2} (7.8/sq mi)
- Population density calculated based on land area.
- Time zone: UTC-5 (ETZ)

Teribe is a town and corregimiento in the Naso Tjër Di Comarca of Panama. It has a land area of 858.5 square kilometres (331.5 sq mi) and had a population of 2,578 as of 2010, giving it a population density of 3 inhabitants per square kilometre (7.8/sq mi). It was created by Law 5 of January 19, 1998. Its population as of 2000 was 1,808.
