= List of provinces and Indigenous regions of Panama by Human Development Index =

This is a list of provinces (provincias) and indigenous regions (comarcas indígenas) of Panama by Human Development Index as of 2023. Indigenous regions are shown in the table in italics.

Note: the HDI values are calculated using pre-2014 borders, so the newly established Panamá Oeste Province (which was split from Panamá Province) is not included in the data and neither is the Naso Tjër Di Comarca since it was created in 2018.

Rank	Region	HDI (2023)
Very high human development
1	Panamá	▲0.872
2	Colón	▲0.849
–	Panama	▲0.839
3	Chiriquí	▲0.839
4	Herrera	▲0.838
5	Los Santos	▲0.833
6	Coclé	▲0.812
High human development
7	Veraguas	▲0.778
8	Bocas del Toro	▲0.768
9	Darién	▲0.737
Medium human development
10	Emberá Comarca	▲0.659
11	Guna Yala	▲0.626
12	Ngäbe-Buglé	▲0.607
