= Forestal Canglón Reserve =

Coordinates: 8.323°N 77.997°W

Forestal Canglon Reserve is a protected area in Darién Province, Panama. The 31,650 ha (316.5 km^{2}) reserve includes lowland tropical forest.

== See also ==
- Protected areas of Panama
