= San San-Pond Sak =

Wetland of Environmental Significance in Northern Panama

Coordinates: 09°24′00″N 82°25′00″W

Designations

Ramsar Wetland
- Official name: San San - Pond Sak
- Designated: 9 June 1993
- Reference no.: 611

San San-Pond Sak is a wetland lagoon area in Panama, spanning 16,125 hectares (39,850 acres), it is the home of the Bocatorian and Ngäbe indigenous people.

The lagoon is listed by the Ramsar Convention group as a site of international importance and is maintained by the local organization AAMVECONA (Association of Friends and Neighbors of the Coast and Nature).

== Environment ==
The area houses parrots, hawks, herons, West Indian manatees, sloths, sandflies, iguanas, monkeys, sea turtles and various snakes. The wetlands have been designated an Important Bird Area (IBA) by BirdLife International because they support significant populations of many bird species.

== See also ==
- Protected areas of Panama
