= Frailes del Sur Islands =

Island group of Panama

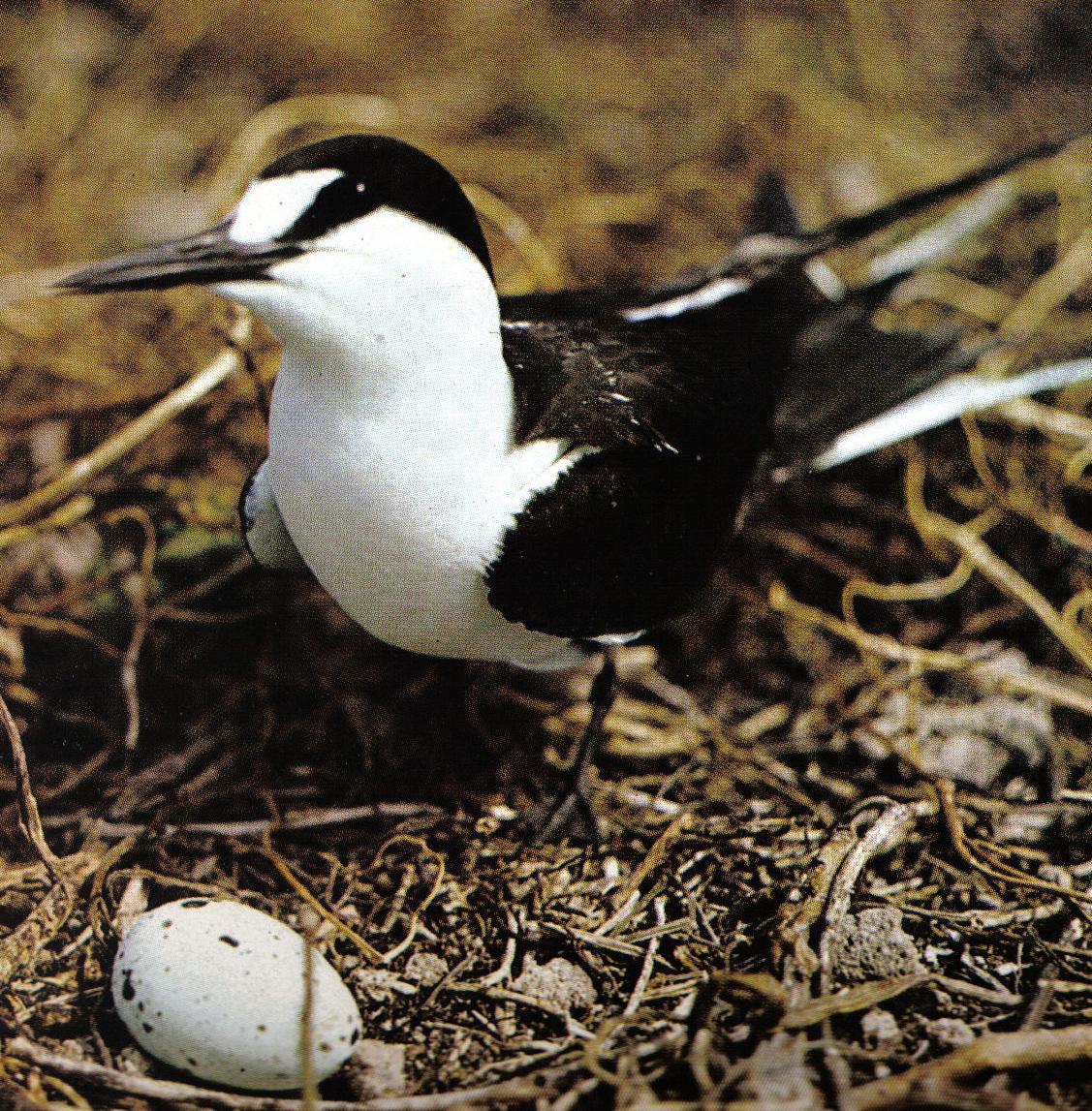
- Sooty tern on nest
- Interactive map of Frailes del Sur Islands

Geography
- Location: Azuero Peninsula
- Coordinates: 07°19′59″N 80°07′59″W
- Total islands: 2
- Area: 0.01 km^{2} (0.0039 sq mi)

Administration
- Panama

Demographics
- Population: Uninhabited

The Frailes del Sur Islands comprise two small and precipitous rocky islets lying some 7 km off the south coast of Panama’s Azuero Peninsula on the Pacific coast of Central America. The islets are uninhabited, have a combined area of about 1 ha and have little vegetation. The group has been designated an Important Bird Area (IBA) by BirdLife International because it supports colonies of bridled and sooty terns, as well as brown noddies. It is the only known nesting site for sooty terns in Panama, with 3000 pairs recorded.
