= Palo Seco Forest Reserve =

Forest reserve of Panama

Coordinates: 9°03′N 82°27′W

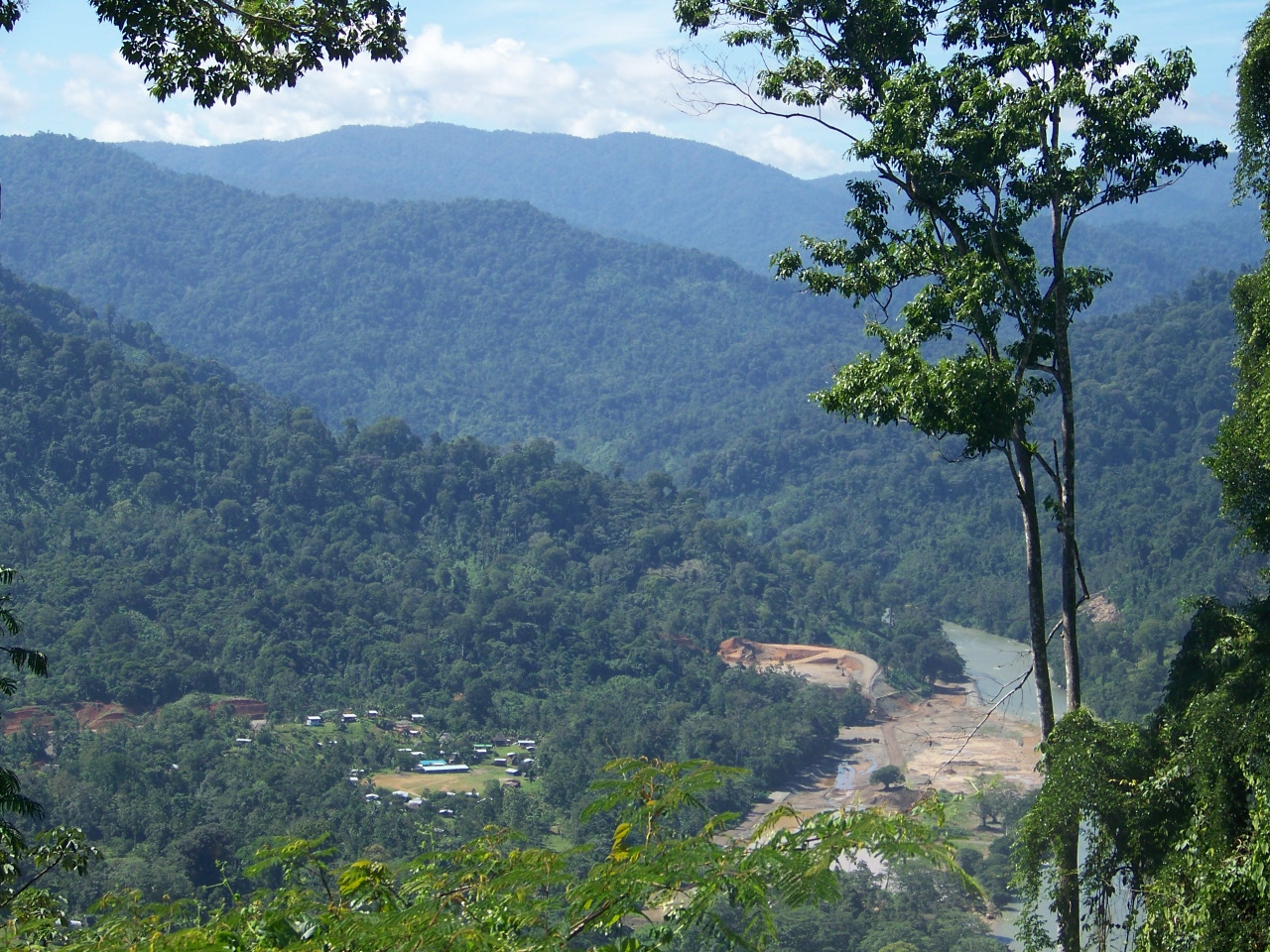
In the reserve

Palo Seco Forest Reserve (Bosque Protector Palo Seco), is a rainforest preserve in Panama in Bocas del Toro Province. The reserve was created in 1983 to be a conservation corridor linking Fortuna Forest Reserve and La Amistad International Park, and has an estimated area of 167,410 ha and its name means dry stick.

== Environment ==
Popular with tree climbers, the reserve includes nutmeg, and ceiba trees. The area is home to tarantulas and eyelash vipers. The reserve has been designated an Important Bird Area (IBA) by BirdLife International because it supports significant populations of many bird species.

== See also ==
- Protected areas of Panama
