= Sieyic =

Sieyic Sieyik
- Location within Panama
- Coordinates: 9°23′00″N 82°39′08″W
- Country: Panama
- Comarca: Naso Tjër Di

Sieyic, also spelled Sieyik, is the capital of the Panamanian comarca (indigenous territory) of Naso Tjër Di. It was made the capital upon the comarca's founding on 4 December 2020, when it was legally separated from the Changuinola District. It is located on the banks of the Teribe River.
