= Altos de Campana National Park =

National park in Panama

- Parque Nacional Altos de Campana
- IUCN category II (national park)
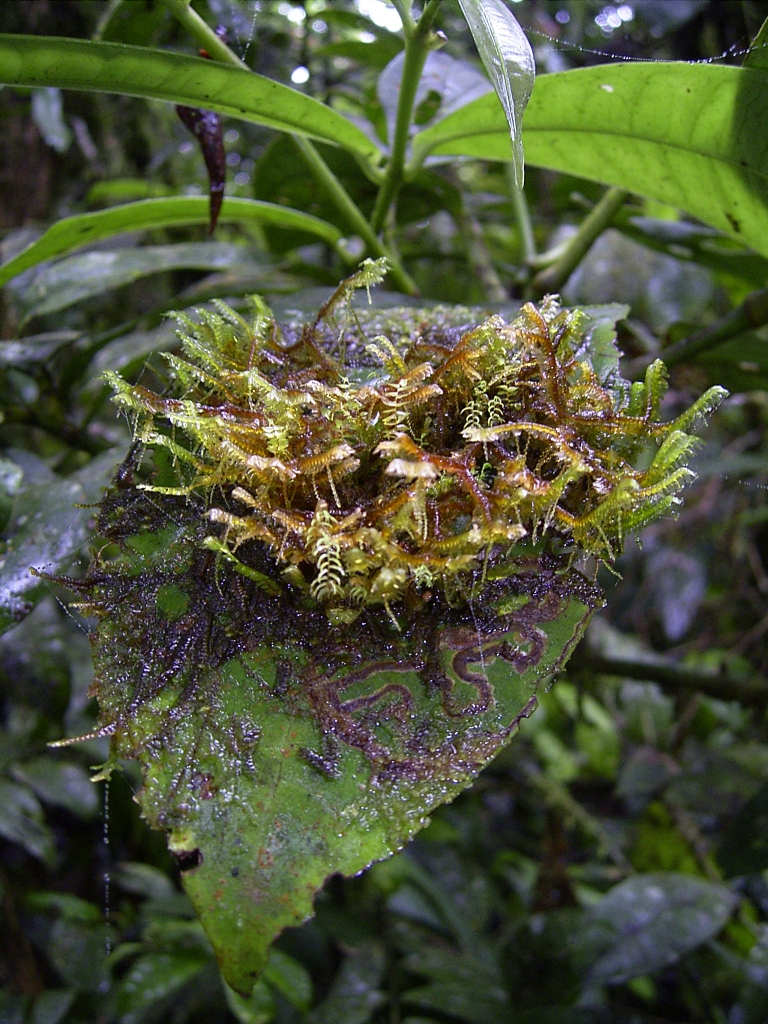
- Epiphyllous plant in Altos de Campana National Park

- Location within Panama
- Location: Mariato District, Panamá Oeste Province, Panama
- Nearest city: Panama City
- Coordinates: 8°42′49″N 79°57′10″W
- Area: 48.16 km^{2} (18.59 sq mi)
- Designation: National park
- Designated: June 28, 1966
- Governing body: Ministry of Environment
- Website: www.parquesnacionales.gob.pa

Altos de Campana National Park (Spanish: Parque nacional Altos de Campana) is Panama's first national park, established in 1966. Located in the province of Panamá Oeste, approximately 50 km west of Panama City, the park spans an area of 4,816 hectares (48.16 km²) and is part of the Talamanca mountain range.

== Geography ==
The park features rugged terrain with steep hills, deep valleys, and dense tropical forests. Its highest peak, Cerro Campana, rises to approximately 1,007 meters (3,304 feet) above sea level, offering panoramic views of the Pacific coastline, the Bay of Chame, and, on clear days, Isla Taboga.

== History ==
Altos de Campana National Park, Panama's first national park, was officially established on June 28, 1966, by Executive Decree No. 153 of 1966 by the National Assembly, primarily to protect vital watersheds that support the Panama Canal system. Located in the Capira district of Panamá Oeste province and spanning approximately 49.21 km², the park was initially designated a biological reserve and later had its boundaries expanded under Decree No. 35 in 1977, published in Official Gazette No. 18645 in 1978. Its strategic placement was motivated by the need to conserve hydrological resources critical to the country's infrastructure. In 2019, it became part of the "Geoparque Puente de las Américas" initiative, which emphasizes sustainable development and the promotion of the region's cultural and geological significance.

== Biodiversity ==
Altos de Campana is renowned for its rich biodiversity:

=== Flora ===
The park's vegetation includes: Four forest types: humid tropical forest, very humid premontane forest, very humid tropical forest, and premontane rainforest. 198 species of trees and 342 species of shrubs. 26 species of vascular plants endemic to Panama.

=== Fauna ===
The park is home to: 39 mammal species, including the Geoffroy's tamarin (Saguinus geoffroyi), two-toed and three-toed sloths, and white-nosed coati (Nasua narica). 267 bird species, such as the orange-bellied trogon, violet-bellied hummingbird, and black-and-white hawk-eagle. 62 amphibian species, including the critically endangered Panamanian golden frog (Atelopus zeteki). 86 reptile species, featuring the eyelash palm pit viper (Bothriechis schlegelii) and green iguana (Iguana iguana).

White-nosed coati

== Geology ==
The park's landscape is influenced by volcanic activity from the El Valle de Antón volcano, which erupted approximately 200,000 years ago. Evidence of this past activity is visible in the form of lava fields and igneous rock formations.

== Conservation and tourism ==
Altos de Campana National Park is recognized as an Important Bird Area (IBA) by BirdLife International, meeting criteria A1 and A2 for its significant bird populations. The park is also part of the Geoparque Puente de las Américas project, aiming to promote ecotourism and sustainable development in the region by highlighting its geological and cultural heritage.

== Accessibility ==
The park is easily accessible by road from Panama City, making it a popular destination for day trips. Visitors can explore various trails, including Sendero La Cruz, which offers diverse terrain and scenic views.
