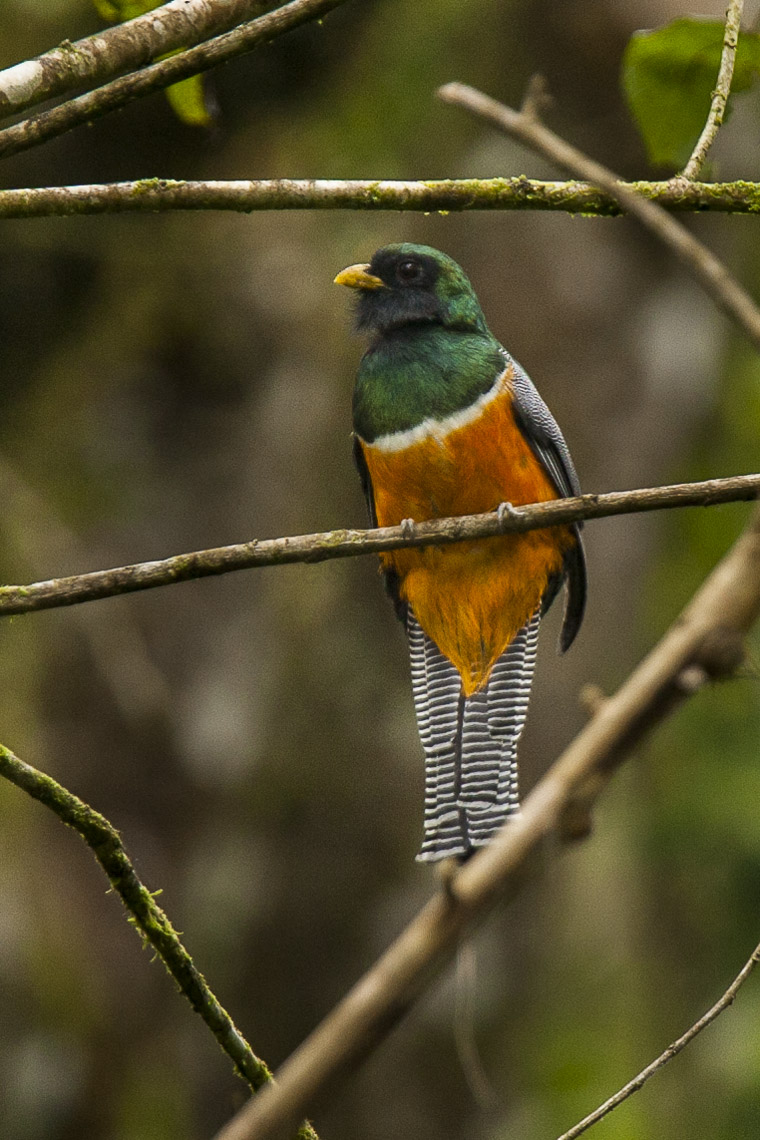

Conservation status
- Least Concern (IUCN 3.1)

Scientific classification
- Kingdom: Animalia
- Phylum: Chordata
- Class: Aves
- Order: Trogoniformes
- Family: Trogonidae
- Genus: Trogon
- Species: T. collaris
- Subspecies: T. c. aurantiiventris

Trinomial name
- Trogon collaris aurantiiventris Gould, 1856

= Orange-bellied trogon =

Subspecies of bird

The orange-bellied trogon (Trogon collaris aurantiiventris) is a subspecies of the collared trogon in the family Trogonidae. It is now usually considered as a morph of the collared trogon, but was previously sometimes treated as a separate species. It is found in the Talamancan montane forests of Costa Rica and Panama.

== Description ==
It measures 26 cm (10 in) long. The back, head and breast of the male are green, and a white line separates the breast from the orange underparts. The undertail is white with black barring, and the wings are black, vermiculated with white. The female has a brown back, head and breast, a relatively uniform undertail (not clearly barred), and underparts that are slightly paler than in the male. It is distinguished from the collared trogon by belly colour alone.

== Habitat ==
Its natural habitats are subtropical or tropical moist montane forests and heavily degraded former forest.
