= Metropolitan Natural Park =

Coordinates: 8.991°N 79.546°W

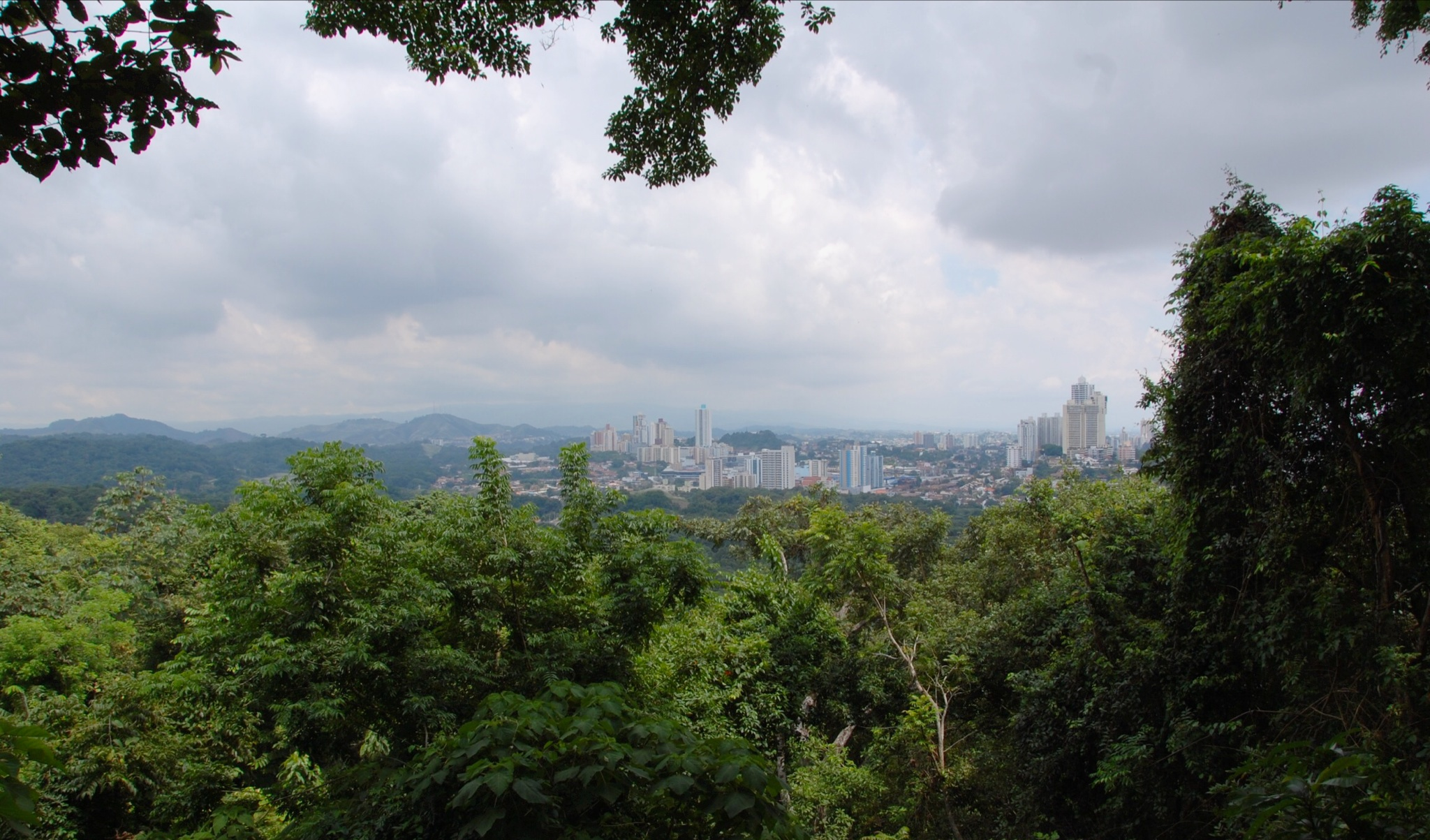
Metropolitan Natural Park

The Metropolitan Natural Park (Parque Natural Metropolitano) is a protected area located in Panama City, Panama. It is the only wildlife refuge in the city. The origins of this park date back to 1974, when the first steps were taken for the optimal use of the area near the Panama Canal. Later, in 1983, this area was declared the Curundú Recreational Area. Finally, in 1975, the president, (Jorge Illueca), took a tour if the area and, as a result, a proposal for a Metropolitan Natural Park (PNM3) was presented. The park was created by Law No. 8 of July 5, 1985 and was inaugurated on June 5, 1988. It is located in the district of Panama, corregimiento of Ancón, on Juan Pablo II Avenue.

== Characteristics ==
This park’s 265 hectares, bordering on the Panamanian watershed, are characterized as a natural protected area of the Panamanian transisthmian region.

== Flora and fauna ==
In the park there are a variety of birds and vertebrate animals typical of the tropical rainforest, such as: the monkey marmoset, the ñeque, macaws, squirrels, etc. It also has nature trails from where you can observe its forests, landscapes and a panoramic view of the capital city..

Despite the proximity of Metropolitano National Park to the capital city, it is home to 227 bird species, 45 species of mammals, 36 species of snakes and 14 species of amphibians.

Approximately 75% of the park is covered by tropical dry forest of the Pacific, an ecosystem that has almost disappeared in other regions of the country. There are also about 284 plant species, including many species of trees, large numbers of creepers, epiphytes, orchids and mosses.

== See also ==
- Parques Nacionales de Panamá
