= Sarigua National Park =

National park in Panama

Coordinates: 8.053°N 80.483°W

Sarigua National Park (Parque Nacional Sarigua) is a national park situated on the Azuero Peninsula in the Herrera Province of Panama, approximately 240 kilometres (150 mi) from Panama City.

The park consists of an ancient archaeological site and was once a dry tropical rainforest. As a result of deforestation, it is now a desert.
