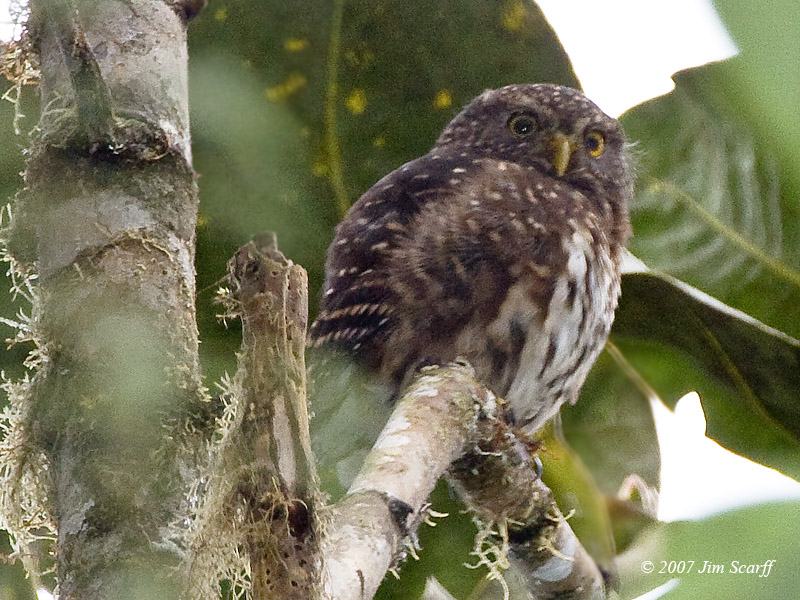
- Upper Tandayapa Valley, NW Ecuador

Conservation status
- Least Concern (IUCN 3.1)
- CITES Appendix II (CITES)

Scientific classification
- Kingdom: Animalia
- Phylum: Chordata
- Class: Aves
- Order: Strigiformes
- Family: Strigidae
- Genus: Glaucidium
- Species: G. jardinii

Binomial name
- Glaucidium jardinii (Bonaparte, 1855)
- Distribution of Andean pygmy owl Resident

= Andean pygmy owl =

Species of owl

The Andean pygmy owl (Glaucidium jardinii) is a species of owl in the family Strigidae. It is found in Colombia, Ecuador, Peru, and Venezuela.

== Taxonomy and systematics ==
The Andean pygmy owl is monotypic.

== Description ==
The Andean pygmy owl is 15 to 16 cm (5.9 to 6.3 in) long. Males weigh 54.9 to 77.4 g (1.9 to 2.7 oz) and females 54.6 to 75 g (1.9 to 2.6 oz). It has two distinct color morphs; in one the head, most of the body, wings, and tail are dull dark brown with white markings and in the other the same areas are dark chestnut with buff markings. In both the crown has small white dots. They have white "brows" over yellow eyes, white "moustaches", and a broad white throat. Their nape has a black and white face-like pattern. Their backs have spots and the tail bars, white or buff respectively. The sides of the breast are dark brown or chestnut with pale markings; the white breast and belly have heavy dark brown or chestnut streaks.

== Distribution and habitat ==
The Andean pygmy owl is found in far western Venezuela and the central and western Andes of Colombia south through Ecuador to central Peru. It inhabits a variety of mountain landscapes including cloudforest, elfin forest, Polylepis woodland, and sometimes more open landscapes like forest edge and pastures with scattered trees. It is found from the middle levels of the forest to the canopy. In elevation it ranges from about 1,500 to 3,500 m (4,900 to 11,500 ft) in Colombia and somewhat higher in Venezuela, Ecuador, and Peru.

== Behavior ==
=== Feeding ===
The Andean pygmy owl is active both day and night. Its diet is invertebrates, small birds, and small mammals.

=== Breeding ===
The Andean pygmy owl's breeding phenology is poorly known. It nests in tree cavities such as old woodpecker holes. The clutch size is usually three.

=== Vocalization ===
The Andean pygmy owl's song is a "long series of rapidly delivered, evenly spaced 'poop' notes" that is sometimes preceded by two whistles.

== Status ==
The IUCN has assessed the Andean pygmy owl as being of Least Concern. Though its population size is not known, the species is "considered fairly common". It has a large range that includes several protected areas. However, it is "probably vulnerable to forest destruction."
