= Fortuna Forest Reserve =

Forest reserve in Panama

- IUCN category VI (protected area with sustainable use of natural resources)
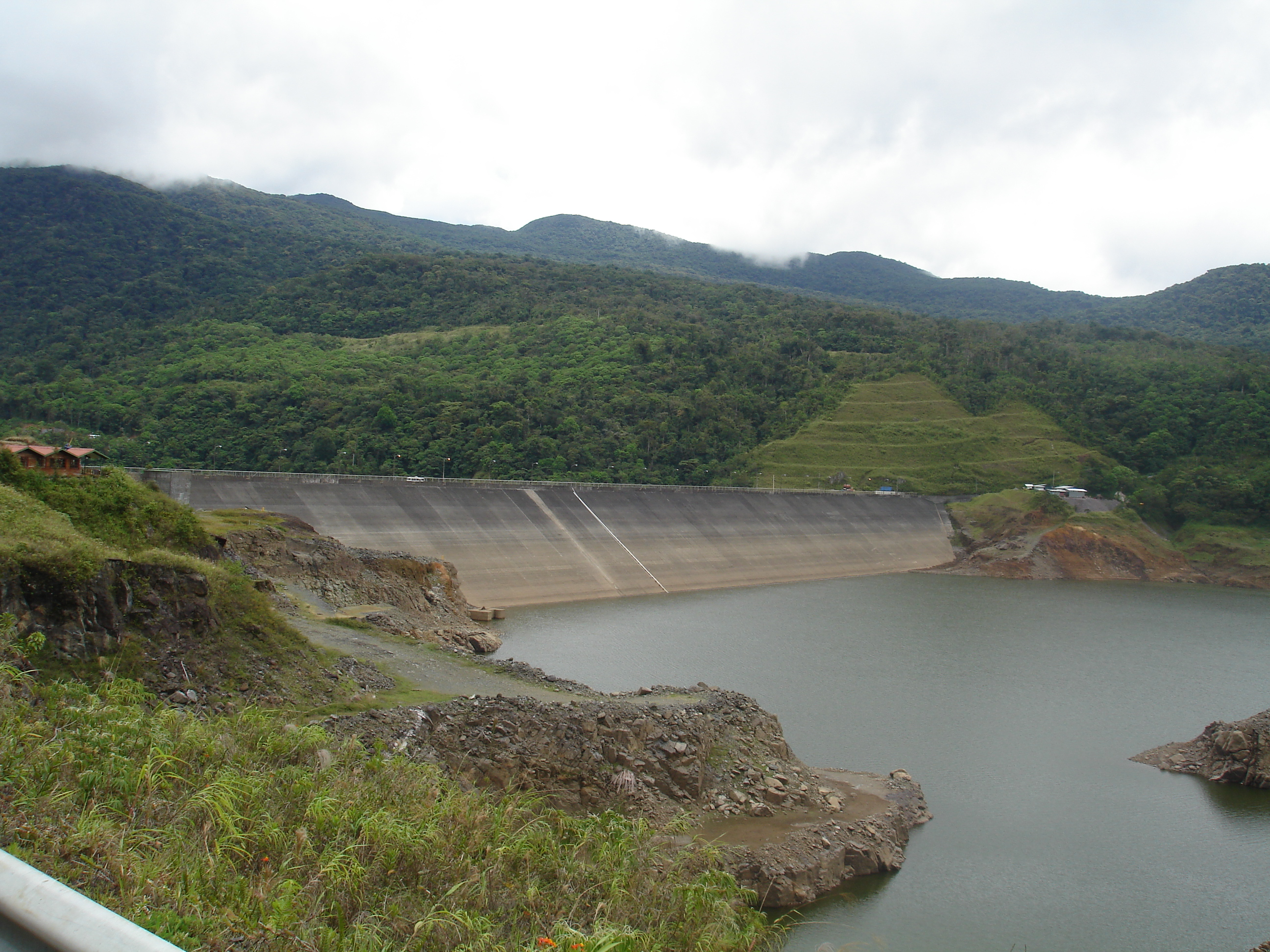
- Hydroelectric dam in Fortuna Forest Reserve.

- Location within Panama Location within Central America
- Location: Chiriquí Province, Panama
- Coordinates: 8°42′38″N 82°10′18″W
- Area: 206.54 km^{2} (79.75 sq mi)
- Established: 1976

Fortuna Forest Reserve is a 206.54 km² forest reserve in the mountains of Chiriquí Province, Panama.

== Geography ==
Fortuna Forest Reserve lies in the eastern foothills of the Cordillera de Talamanca near the transition to the Cordillera Central (Panamá). The Cerro Chorcha is the highest point of the Fortuna Forest Reserve at 2,213 m above sea level. More than 4,000 mm of rain falls in the reserve every year. The average temperature is 20°C with a minimum of 10°C and a maximum of 27°C during a day. By means of a dam, hydroelectricity is being generated in the reserve.

== Environment ==
The reserve contains mountain forests and cloud forest on volcanic soils. The forest is home to 1,136 plant species.

=== Fauna ===
The reserve has the highest number of endemic species of any protected area in Panama. In particular, the diversity of amphibians is great. It is home for 70 amphibians and reptiles. Besides small mammals, the jaguar can also be found there. Bird species in the reserve include the resplendent quetzal and military macaw. The reserve has been designated an Important Bird Area (IBA) by BirdLife International because it supports significant populations of many bird species.

== History ==
On 21 September 1976 Fortuna was declared a forest reserve. In 2001 an agreement was signed with the Smithsonian Tropical Research Institute and since then various scientific studies have been carried out in the reserve, such as on disappearing amphibian populations and the influence of climate change on epiphytes.

== See also ==
- Protected areas of Panama
