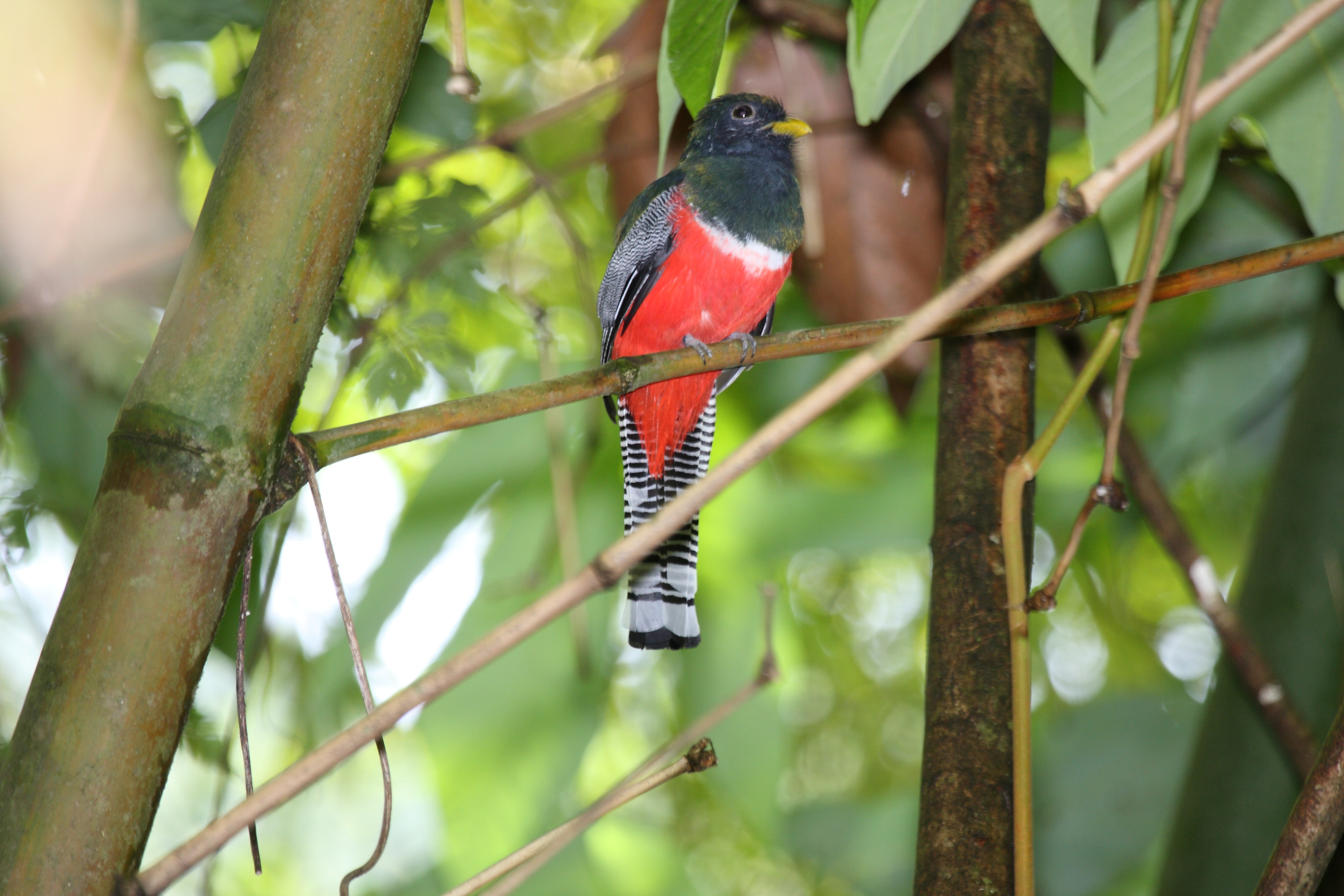
- Male

Conservation status
- Least Concern (IUCN 3.1)

Scientific classification
- Kingdom: Animalia
- Phylum: Chordata
- Class: Aves
- Order: Trogoniformes
- Family: Trogonidae
- Genus: Trogon
- Species: T. collaris

Binomial name
- Trogon collaris Vieillot, 1817

= Collared trogon =

Species of bird

The collared trogon (Trogon collaris) is a species of bird in family Trogonidae, the quetzals and trogons. It is found in Mexico, throughout Central America, and in northern South America.

== Taxonomy and systematics ==
The International Ornithological Committee (IOC) and the Clements taxonomy recognize these 10 subspecies of collared trogon. They treated T. c. aurantiiventris ("orange-bellied trogon") as a separate species until the late 2010s.

- T. c. puella Gould (1846)
- T. c. underwoodi Bangs (1908)
- T. c. aurantiiventris Gould (1846)
- T. c. extimus Griscom (1929)
- T. c. heothinus Wetmore (1967)
- T. c. virginalis Cabanis & Heine (1863)
- T. c. subtropicalis Zimmer (1948)
- T. c. exoptatus Cabanis & Heine (1863)
- T. c. collaris Vieillot (1817)
- T. c. castaneus Spix (1824)

BirdLife International's Handbook of the Birds of the World (HBW) recognizes eight subspecies, excluding T. c. aurantiiventris and T. c. underwoodi.

== Description ==
Trogons have distinctive male and female plumages, with soft, often colorful, feathers. The collared trogon is about 25 to 29 cm (9.8 to 11.4 in) long and weigh about 41 to 64 g (1.4 to 2.3 oz). Both sexes have a black face and throat. The male's crown, nape, back, and rump are bright metallic green. The folded wing shows black and white vermiculation. The breast is also metallic green with a white band separating it from the bright red belly and vent. The upperside of the tail is green with a black tip and the underside is barred black and white. The female is olive brown where the male is green, the closed wing is brown with black vermiculation, and the belly is a duller red than the male's. The underside of the tail is gray with a few black bars and white tips.

== Distribution and habitat ==
The 10 subspecies of collared trogon are found thus:

- T. c. puella, central Mexico to western Panama
- T. c. underwoodi, northwestern Costa Rica
- T. c. aurantiiventris, central Costa Rica to western Panama
- T. c. extimus, eastern Darién Province in northeastern Panama
- T. c. heothinus, Panama's Serranía del Darién
- T. c. virginalis, western Colombia through western Ecuador into northwestern Peru
- T. c. subtropicalis, central Colombia, especially the Magdalena and Cauca valleys
- T. c. exoptatus, northern Venezuela (and Trinidad and Tobago?)
- T. c. collaris, east of the Andes from Colombia south to northern Bolivia and east through the Guianas and much of west central Brazil (and Trinidad and Tobago?)
- T. c. castaneus, southeastern Colombia south to eastern Peru and northern Bolivia and into northwestern Brazil; also eastern Brazil

Clements places T. c. exoptatus in Trinidad & Tobago; the IOC places T. c. collaris there instead.

In South America the collared trogon inhabits humid lowland evergreen forest, both primary and well-established secondary. In Mexico and Central America it inhabits those forest types and in addition humid montane, semideciduous, and pine-evergreen forests. It is found as high as 2,400 m (7,870 ft) in Mexico and 2,300 m (7,550 ft) in Costa Rica, but in the Andes it is mostly below 1,300 m (4,270 ft) in Ecuador and 1,200 m (3,940 ft) in Peru.

== Behavior ==
The collared trogon usually perches between the higher understory and the lower part of the canopy. It is usually seen singly or in pairs, but small groups may gather outside the breeding season.

=== Feeding ===
The collared trogon eats small fruits (such as berries) and invertebrates such as caterpillars, crickets, cicadas, beetles, and phasmids. They often accompany the edges of mixed-species foraging flocks but do not mix with the other members.

=== Breeding ===
The collared trogon's nesting season is highly variable across the species' wide distribution, beginning as early as November in French Guiana and as late as April in Venezuela. It nests in cavities in decaying wood or arboreal termite nests; the cavity is often so shallow that much of the bird is visible. The normal clutch size is two eggs. Both sexes incubate the eggs and care for the young.

=== Vocalization ===
The collared trogon's song varies geographically. The Mexican and Central American populations sing "a plaintive 2-3 noted kyow'-kyow or caow' caow, and a faster kyow kyow-kyow". South American songs are described as "a series of mellow whistled notes, usually with a stuttered introductory note: whi'whi whew-whew-whew." Calls include "a prolonged charr" and a "snorting chur-r-r-r".

== Status ==
The IUCN has assessed the collared trogon as being of Least Concern. It has a very large, though not quantified, population and a very large range.
