= Teribe River =

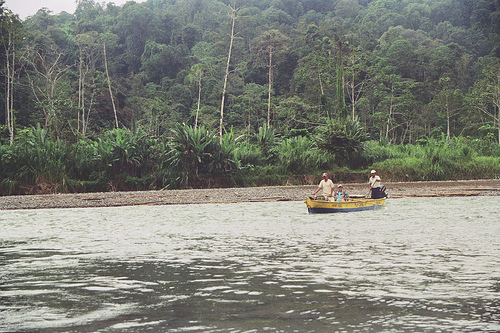
- Rio Teribe in Bocas del Toro Province

Location
- Country: Panama

The Teribe River is a river in Panama.

== See also ==
- List of rivers of Panama
