= Aeroperlas =

Panamanian regional airline, 1970–2012

IATA	ICAO	Call sign
WL	APP	AEROPERLAS
- Founded: June 1970
- Ceased operations: February 29, 2012
- Hubs: Marcos Gelabert International Airport
- Secondary hubs: Enrique Malek International Airport
- Frequent-flyer program: Distancia
- Alliance: Grupo TACA
- Fleet size: 4
- Destinations: 15
- Parent company: APAIR (80%); AMR Corporation (20%)
- Headquarters: Panama City, Panama
- Employees: 150 (2012)
- Website: www.aeroperlas.com

Aeroperlas (acronym for Aerolíneas Islas de Las Perlas) was a regional airline based in Panama City, Panama. It was the third largest airline in the country, surpassed only by Air Panama and Copa Airlines. From its hub at Marcos A. Gelabert and Enrique Malek International Airports, Aeroperlas operated over 50 daily scheduled flights to 15 domestic destinations, as well as charter and courier flights. It operated services as part of the Grupo TACA regional airlines system.

On February 29, 2012, Aeroperlas ceased operations due to financial problems.

== History ==
=== Inauguration and expansion years ===
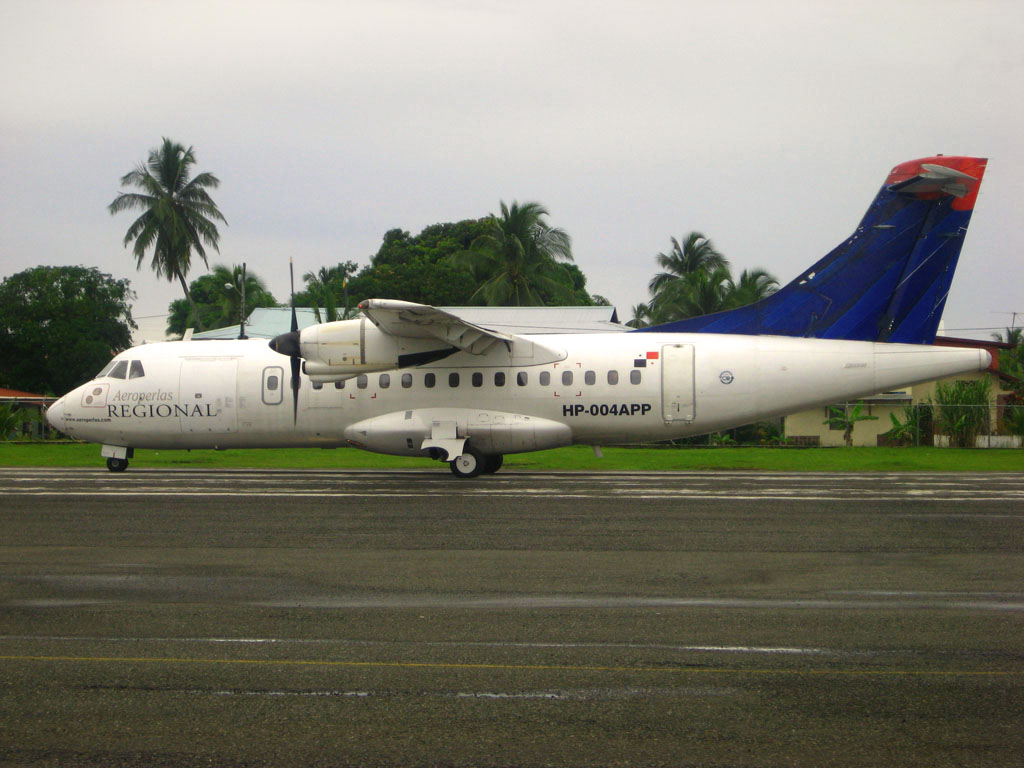
An Aeroperlas ATR 42-300 at Bocas del Toro Airport in 2009

The airline was founded in June 1970 as Aerolíneas Islas de las Perlas and started operations shortly after. It was a state-owned company from 1976 until 1987 when it was sold to private owners.

During the late 1990s, Aeroperlas was owned by APAIR (80%) and the parent company of American Eagle Airlines, AMR Corporation (20%). According to Dan Garton, AMR took a stake in Aeroperlas to find a way of streamlining American Eagle's fleet and placing their Shorts 360 fleet with another airline. It was unclear if AMR remained a shareholder in the airline by 2009. In 1996, Aeroperlas began international operations, launching services to Costa Rica.

In 2001, Aeroperlas became an affiliate member of Grupo TACA and made big improvements in terms of security.

In October 2007, the airline became the first Panamanian regional airline to be certified under the strict regulations of Panama's Civil Aeronautic Authority (ACC) agency. It was also the first airline in Panama to neutralize CO_{2} emissions from the air, because of a partnership with nature conservation group ANCON, which included the promotion of trees conservation at a private reserve in Darién Province.

In July 2011, Aeroperlas started scheduled flights from the domestic terminal of Tocumen International Airport to Chirquí and Bocas del Toro provinces, with a stopover at Albrook "Marcos A. Gelabert" International Airport.

=== Demise and closure ===
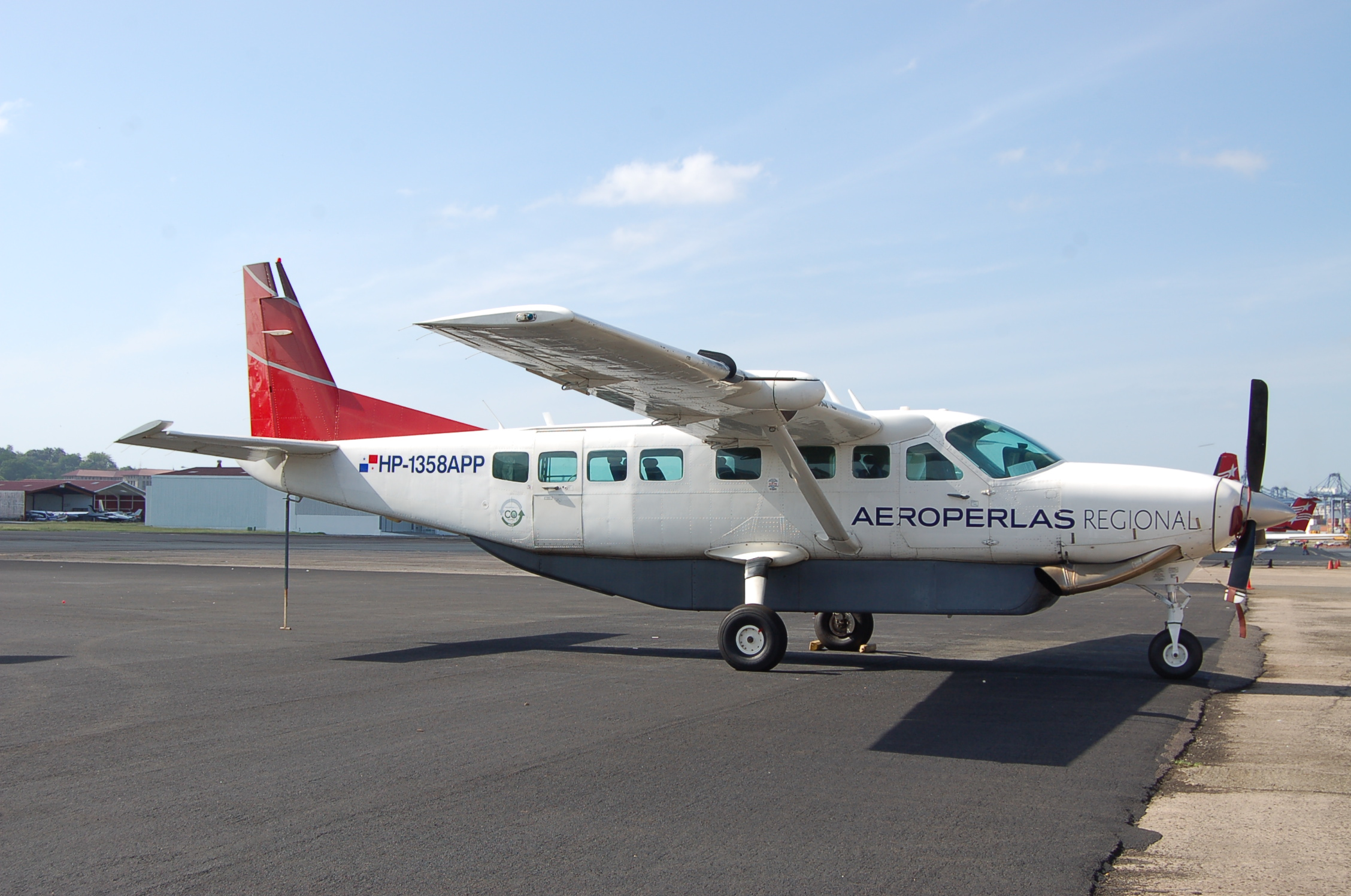
An Aeroperlas Cessna 208 Caravan parked at Marcos A. Gelabert International Airport in 2011

The beginning of the end for Aeroperlas came in 2010 when two well-publicized incidents involving ATR 42 aircraft caused Panama's Civil Aeronautic Authority to raise several safety and maintenance issues. The public's confidence in Aeroperlas took a downturn as a consequence, with passenger numbers dropping by one-third. This caused Aeroperlas to suffer serious financial problems and to withdraw all the de Havilland Canada DHC-6 Twin Otters from the fleet, which were sold to other airlines or scrapped.

In February 2012, hundreds of people from the Ngobe-Bugle tribe blocked several points of the Pan-American Highway in Panama for almost a week, protesting against a mining project in Cerro Colorado. This caused major disruptions in traffic to the extent that the Minister of Tourism at that time, Salomoh Shamah, decided to create a nationwide airlift to move people and tourists who were stranded on the highway, at bus terminals and airports, and critical supplies without any cost. This situation aggravated Aeroperlas' financial problems to the point of entering Chapter 11 bankruptcy protection.

On February 29, 2012, Aeroperlas ceased operations, citing market conditions and an obsolete business model. Around 150 employees were left without work, and they were transferred to Air Panama along with the routes left by the airline, and Copa Airlines. On March 6, 2012, Aeroperlas made its last official scheduled flight from Tocumen Airport to Bocas del Toro, thus ending 41 years of operation.

== Destinations ==
Aeroperlas operated services to the following scheduled regional destinations:

Country	City	Airport	Notes
Panama	Achutupo	Achutupo Airport	
Panama	Bocas del Toro	Bocas del Toro "Isla Colón" International Airport	
Panama	Changuinola	Changuinola "Capitán Manuel Niño" International Airport	
Panama	Contadora Island	Contadora Airport	
Panama	David	Enrique Malek International Airport	Hub
Panama	Jaqué	Jaqué Airport	
Panama	Mamitupo	Mamitupu Airport	
Panama	Ogobsucum	Ustupu-Ogobsucum Airport	
Panama	Panama City	Albrook "Marcos A. Gelabert" International Airport	Hub
Panama	Panama City	Tocumen International Airport	
Panama	Pedasi	Pedasí Airport	
Panama	Playón Chico	Playón Chico Airport	
Panama	Puerto Obaldia	Puerto Obaldia Airport	
Panama	Puerto Piña	Bahía Piña Airport	
Panama	Tubualá	Tubualá Airport	
Costa Rica	San José	Juan Santamaría International Airport	

Only scheduled international flight to San José, was later operated by Air Panama from David until August 2016.

== Fleet ==
=== Final fleet ===
The Aeroperlas fleet included the following aircraft (as of September 2010):

Aeroperlas fleet
Aircraft	In service	Orders	Passengers	Notes
ATR 42-300	2	—	42	Operated as TACA Regional
Cessna 208B Grand Caravan	2	—	12	
Total	4	—		

=== Retired fleet ===
The airline formerly operated the following aircraft:

- 2 Beechcraft Model 99
- 2 Canadair CC-109 Cosmopolitan
- 15 de Havilland Canada DHC-6 Twin Otter
- 4 Embraer EMB-110 Bandeirante
- 3 GAF Nomad
- 8 Shorts 360

== Accidents and incidents ==
During its early years of operation, Aeroperlas had a less-than-admirable safety record (as detailed below). However, since its commercial affiliation with TACA Airlines in 2004, operational procedures were improved, and safety technology on aircraft were upgraded. The installation of a new, safety-focused management team in late 2005 improved Aeroperlas' safety record. In 2006, according to official numbers published by the Panamanian Civil Aviation Authority, Aeroperlas suffered just one minor incident - the same safety record as Panama's Copa Airlines achieved in the same period.

As of May 15, 2007, Aeroperlas had a clean safety record and started pointing to its safety strength in commercial activities (e.g.; its "Fly Safely, Fly Aeroperlas" campaign).

Aeroperlas reported incidents
Date	Aircraft	Location	Description	Casualties				
Date	Aircraft	Location	Description	Fatal	Serious	Minor	Uninjured	Ground
April 18, 1990	De Havilland Canada DHC-6 Twin Otter	near Contadora Island, Panama	The No. 2 engine of a De Havilland Canada DHC-6 Twin Otter (registered N187SA) failed shortly after taking off from Contadora Airport. The airplane entered into a descending turn which continued until impact with the sea. Of the 19 passengers and 3 crew that were on board, only 2 survived.	20	2	0	0	0
March 17, 2000	De Havilland Canada DHC-6 Twin Otter	Near Puerto Obaldía, Guna Yala	A De Havilland Canada DHC-6 Twin Otter (registered HP-1267APP) departed Marcos A. Gelabert International Airport at 08:46 AM for a scheduled passenger flight to Puerto Obaldía, Guna Yala. The plane went missing some 20 minutes prior to the ETA. En route altitude was 7,500 feet (2,300 m) and weather conditions allowed VFR. Initially, the aircraft was thought to have been hijacked to Colombia. However, on March 22, a search party aboard a Cessna 208B Grand Caravan (registered HP-1355APP) located the wreckage 12.5 NM from Puerto Obaldía at 11:35 AM. The wreckage was found at the 2,500 feet (760 m) level of a 2,790-foot-high (850 m) mountain. None of the 8 passengers and 2 crew survived.	10	0	0	0	0
September 9, 2000	De Havilland Canada DHC-6 Twin Otter	Rio Sidra Airport, Darien	A De Havilland Canada DHC-6 Twin Otter (registered HP-1276APP) was damaged when it overran the runway of Rio Sidra Airport on landing and collided with a tree. The 19 passengers and 2 crew aboard the aircraft were uninjured, and the aircraft was repaired. The same aircraft, flown by the same pilot, had to make a precautionary landing at Enrique Jiménez Airport due to engine problems on June 12, 2000.	0	0	0	0	22
August 16, 2004	Cessna 208B Grand Caravan	Arraiján District, Panama	A Cessna 208B Grand Caravan (registered HP-1397APP) bound to Chitré, Herrera Province, suffered an engine failure and had to carry an emergency landing on a small active road in the Arraiján district. The airplane suffered substantial damage when it struck a tree, but all 5 passengers and 2 crew were uninjured. The aircraft was written off.	0	0	0	7	0
May 16, 2009	De Havilland Canada DHC-6 Twin Otter	Cartí Airport, Guna Yala	a De Havilland Canada DHC-6 Twin Otter (registered HP-747APP) suffered damage shortly after landing at Cartí Airport when it veered off the runway. The right main landing wheel stuck into the grass/mud and the plane turned 90 degrees to the runway before nosediving into the grass. The nose cone flew off on impact with visible damage to the fuselage and both wingtips. All 15 passengers and 2 crew survived.	0	0	0	17	0

=== Hijackings ===
- On July 5, 1990, De Havilland Canada DHC-6 Twin Otter was hijacked. The hijacker(s) demanded to be taken to Colombia. The hijacking lasted less than one day. The Twin Otter was stolen by the Revolutionary Armed Forces of Colombia on the same day on a flight from Colón and was destroyed in August 1990.

== See also ==
- List of defunct airlines of Panama
