= List of airports in Panama =

This is a list of airports in Panama, sorted by location and including both international and domestic airports.

== Airports ==
Airport names shown in bold indicate the airport has scheduled service on commercial airlines.

Panama City Tocumen airport is the hub, and the busiest airport in all of Central America.

City served	Province	ICAO	IATA	Airport name
Assudub	Guna Yala	MPAC	ACU	Achutupo Airport
Aggwanusadub	Guna Yala	MPCJ	CZJ	Corazón de Jesús Airport
Agligandi	Guna Yala	MPAI	AIL	Ailigandí Airport
Aguadulce	Coclé			Aguadulce Airport - Closed
Aguadulce	Coclé	MPIO		Ingenio Ofelina Airport
Arenas	Veraguas	MPAR		Arenas Airport
Bocas del Toro	Bocas del Toro	MPBO	BOC	**José Ezequiel Hall International Airport**
Caledonia	Guna Yala	MPCA		Caledonia Airport
Calzada Larga	Panamá	MPCL		Cap. Alex H. Bosquez Airport
Casaya Island	Panamá	MPCS		Casaya Airport
Chame	Panamá Oeste	MPCM		Cap. Krish Persaud Airport
Chame	Panamá Oeste	MPMC		Chame Mayor Airport
Changuinola	Bocas del Toro	MPCH	CHX	**Cap. Manuel Niño Airport**
Changuinola	Bocas del Toro	MPSS		Finca 67 Airport
Chitré	Herrera	MPCE	CTD	**Cap. Alonso Valderrama Airport**
Coiba	Veraguas	MPCO		Coiba Airport
Colón	Colón	MPEJ	ONX	Enrique Adolfo Jiménez Airport
Contadora Island	Panamá	MPRA	OTD	**Cnel. Raúl Arias Espinoza Airport**
David	Chiriquí	MPDA	DAV	**Enrique Malek International Airport**
Dubwala	Guna Yala	MPTU	TUW	Tubualá Airport
El Real de Santa María	Darién	MPRE	ELE	El Real Airport
El Roble	Coclé	MPSR		Ingenio Santa Rosa Airport
Finca Blanco	Chiriquí	MPBR		Baru Airport
Fuerte Sherman	Colón	MPFS		Fort Sherman - Closed
Gaigirgordub	Guna Yala	MPVR	PVE	El Porvenir Airport - Closed
Garachiné	Darién	MPGA	GHE	Garachiné Airport
Gardi Sugdub	Guna Yala		CTE	Cartí Airport - Closed
Guarumal	Chiriquí	MPCB		La Cabezona Airport - Closed
Guayabito	Panamá Oeste	MPGS		Guayabito de San Carlos Airport - Closed
Jaqué	Darién	MPJE	JQE	Jaqué Airport
La Palma	Darién	MPLP	PLP	Captain Ramon Xatruch Airport - Closed
La Palma	Darién	MPMF		Miraflores Airport
Lagartero	Veraguas	MPLY		Lago Bay Airport
Las Lajas	Chiriquí	MPLA		Las Lajas Airport
Las Lajas	Chiriquí	MPMB		Missions Beyond Aviation Airport
Las Tablas	Bocas del Toro	MPFC		Finca 45 Airport
Los Santos	Los Santos	MPGU		Augusto Vergara Airport
Mammidub	Guna Yala	MPMA	MPI	Mamitupo Airport
Mamsuggun	Guna Yala	MPMN		Mansucum Airport
Muladub	Guna Yala	MPMU	MPP	Mulatupo Airport
Palo Grande	Chiriquí	MPMO		Las Moras Airport - Closed
Panama City	Panamá	MPES		La Especial Airport
Panama City	Panamá	MPMG	PAC	**Marcos A. Gelabert International Airport**
Panama City	Panamá Oeste	MPPA	BLB	**Panamá Pacífico International Airport**
Panama City	Panamá	MPTO	PTY	**Tocumen International Airport**
Pedasí	Los Santos	MPPD	PDM	**Cap. Justiniano Montenegro Airport**
Pedro González	Panamá	MPFE		Fernando Eleta Airport
Penonomé	Coclé	MPPN		Guillermo Palm Airport
Pixvae	Veraguas	MPPX		Pixvae Airport
Puerto Obaldía	Guna Yala	MPOA	PUE	Puerto Obaldía Airport
Puerto Piña	Darién	MPPI	BFQ	Piña Airport
Punta Cocos	Panamá	MPPU		Punta Cocos Airport
Punta Patiño	Darién	MPRP		Reserva Punta Patiño Airport
Río Azúcar	Guna Yala	MPRZ		Río Azúcar Airport
Río Hato	Coclé	MPSM	RIH	**Cap. Scarlett Martínez International Airport**
Río Sidra	Guna Yala	MPRS		Río Sidra Airport
Sambú	Darién	MPSB	SAX	Sambú Airport
Isla San José	Panamá	MPSJ	SIC	Isla San José Airport
San Miguel	Panamá	MPMI	NMG	San Miguel Airport
Santa Fe	Veraguas	MPRG		Cap. Reynaldo Guiraud Airport
Santiago de Veraguas	Veraguas	MPSA	SYP	Rubén Cantú Airport
Islas Secas	Chiriquí	MPSE		Islas Secas Airport
Isla Ticantikí	Guna Yala	MPTI		Ticantikí Airport
Tonosí	Los Santos			Tonosí Airport - Closed
Uggubseni	Guna Yala	MPPH	PYC	Playón Chico Airport
Usdub	Guna Yala	MPOG	OGM	Ogobsucum Airport
Usdub	Guna Yala	MPUP	UTU	Ustupo Airport
Isla Viveros	Panamá	MPVI	IVI	Isla Viveros Airport - Closed
Volcán	Chiriquí	MPVC		Alvaro Berroa Airport
Wannukandi	Guna Yala	MPWN	NBL	Wannukandí Airport
Yaviza	Darién		PYV	Yaviza Airport - Closed

== See also ==
- Transportation in Panama
- List of airports by ICAO code: M#MP - Panama
- Wikipedia:WikiProject Aviation/Airline destination lists: North America#Panama
