= Enrique Adolfo Jiménez Airport =

Enrique Adolfo Jiménez Airport Aeropuerto Enrique Adolfo Jiménez
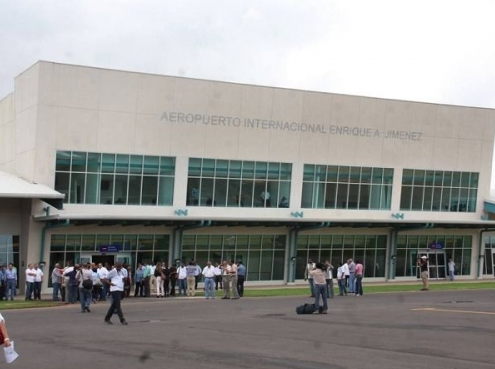
- IATA: ONX; ICAO: MPEJ

Summary
- Airport type: National
- Location: Colón, Panama
- Elevation AMSL: 28 ft / 9 m
- Coordinates: 09°21′24″N 079°52′03″W

Map
- Location in Panama

Runways
Direction	Length		Surface
Direction	m	ft	Surface
18/36	2,700	8,858	Concrete
- Source: WAD SkyVector

Enrique Adolfo Jiménez Airport (Spanish: Aeropuerto Enrique Adolfo Jiménez) (IATA: ONX, ICAO: MPEJ) is an airport located in Colón, Panama, offering scheduled airline flights to Panama City. The airport is just east of Colon's harbor and cargo handling facilities.

== History ==
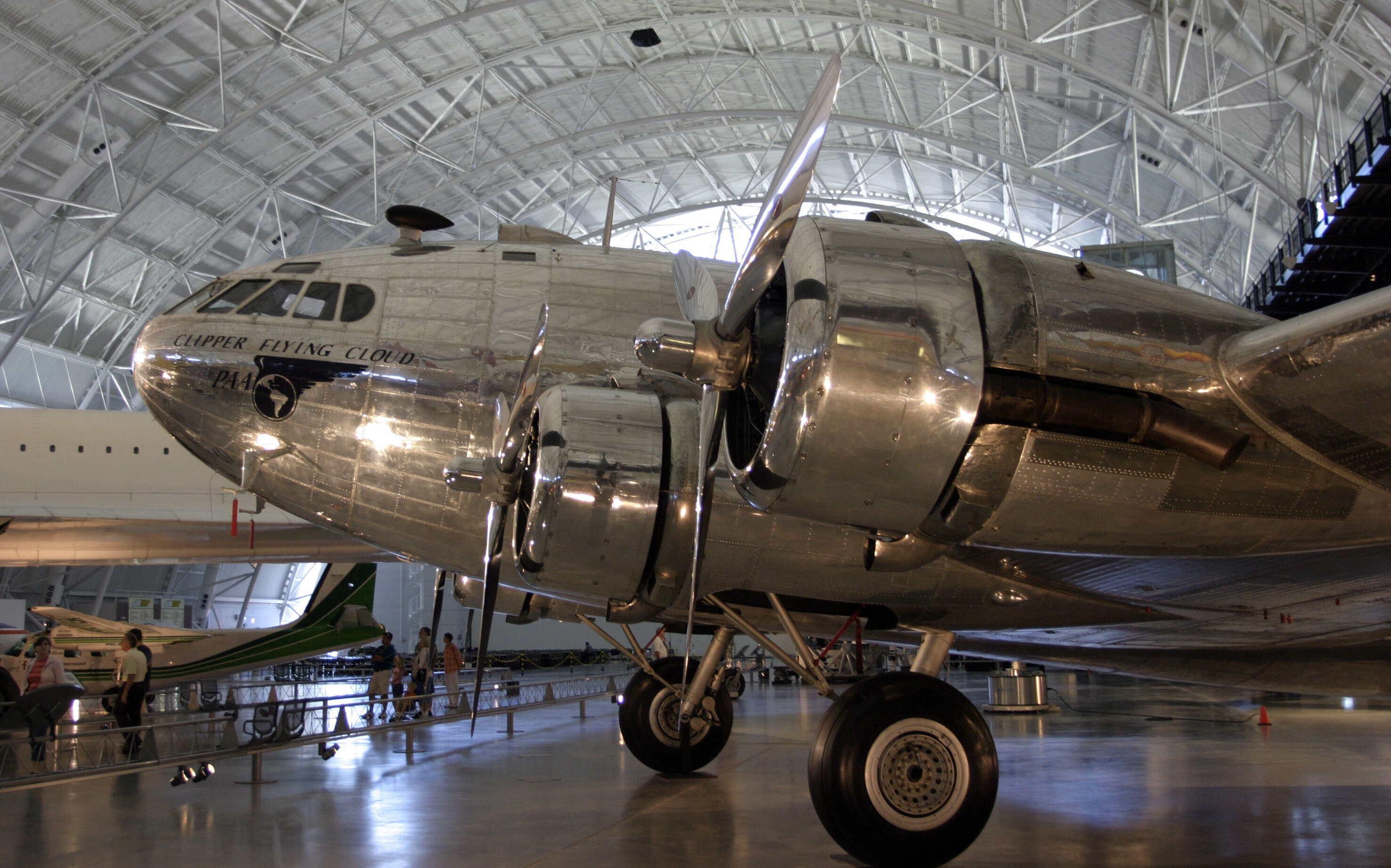
A Pan Am Boeing 307 Stratoliner, dubbed Clipper Flying Cloud, of the sort that would fly into Colón during the World War II years

The airport was established in 1918 as a United States Army Air Forces (later USAF) military airfield, eventually becoming France Air Force Base. It was deactivated on 1 November 1949 due to budgetary reductions, turned into a civil airport in the United States Canal Zone, and renamed Colon Airport. The USAF, however, maintained jurisdiction over the airport until 31 December 1973, and it was occasionally used as a satellite field of Albrook AFB.

As Colon Airport, it was served by Boeing 307 Stratoliners and other early airliners flying Pan Am routes from Miami to Buenos Aires, Argentina via Havana, Cuba and Kingston, Jamaica into Cristobal and Colón, then continuing south via Lima, Peru, into Buenos Aires. Being located near the midpoint of this route and at the point where it intersected the Panama Canal made this location a useful one for north–south airline services.

With the return of the Canal Zone to Panama on 31 December 1999, American control ended and the airport was renamed for Enrique Adolfo Jiménez, who served as Panamanian president from 1945 to 1948.

On August 20, 2013, Panamanian President Ricardo Martinelli opened the new Enrique A. Jimenez International Airport. The new terminal can serve up to 1000 passengers at the peak period and the new runway can land aircraft of B757 type.

== Airline and destination ==
Airlines	Destinations
Air Panama	Charter: Panama City-Albrook

== Incidents and accidents ==
This airport was the departure point for Alas Chiricanas Flight 00901, blown up by Arab terrorists in 1994.

== See also ==
- Transport in Panama
- List of airports in Panama
