= Albrook =

Albrook may refer to the following entities in Panama:

- Albrook (Panama Metro), a Panama City Metro station
- Albrook Air Force Station, a former U.S. Air Force base near Panama Canal
  - Albrook (area), a complex of buildings formerly part of the airbase; see International Maritime University of Panama
- Albrook Mall, Panama City
- Albrook "Marcos A. Gelabert" International Airport, west of Panama City
- Albrook Massacre, the execution of military officers following a failed coup
