= Flytrip =

Panamanian airline

| IATA | ICAO | Call sign |
|---|---|---|
| FE | AAD | PANABEAR |
- Founded: 8 April 1999
- Commenced operations: 2000
- Hubs: Albrook "Marcos A. Gelabert" International Airport
- Fleet size: 4
- Destinations: 4
- Headquarters: Panama City, Panama
- Key people: Hector Antonio Rodriguez (President)
- Website: flytrip.com.pa

Arrendamientos Aéreos, S.A., also known as Flytrip, is a Panamanian airline which operates scheduled flights from Panama City to Bocas del Toro, Contadora Island, and Pedasí. The airline was founded on 8 April 1999 and it commenced operations in the year 2000.

== Fleet ==
The Flytrip fleet consists of the following aircraft (as of July 2025):

| Type | Fleet | Orders | Passengers |
|---|---|---|---|
| Daher Kodiak 100 | 2 | — | 9 |
| Cessna 208B Caravan (Cessna Grand Caravan EX) | 2 | — | 12 |
| Total | 4 | — | |

== Destinations ==
The airline offers flights from the Albrook International Airport in Panama City, to the following locations:

| Location | Province | IATA | ICAO | Airport | Frecuency | Refs |
|---|---|---|---|---|---|---|
| Bocas Town | Bocas del Toro | BOC | MBPO | José Ezequiel Hall International Airport | Daily | |
| Pedasí | Los Santos | PDM | MPPD | Capt. Justiniano Montenegro Airport | Daily | |
| Contadora Island | Panama | OTD | MPRA | Raul Arias Espinoza Airport | Weekends only | |
