= Bocas del Toro =

Bocas del Toro is the Spanish for "bull's mouths" or "bull's gulf". Bocas del Toro refers to many places in Panama.

- Bocas Town, Bocas del Toro, a town and provincial capital on Isla Colón, Panama
- Bocas del Toro District, an administrative district in Bocas del Toro Province, Panama
- Bocas del Toro Province, a province in Panama
- Bocas del Toro "Isla Colón" International Airport, an airport in the town of Bocas del Toro
- Bocas del Toro Archipelago, a group of islands on the Caribbean coast of Panama
