= Mulatupo Airport =

Mulatupo Airport Aeropuerto de Mulatupo
- IATA: MPP; ICAO: none

Summary
- Airport type: Public
- Serves: Mulatupo, Panama
- Elevation AMSL: 32 ft / 10 m
- Coordinates: 8°56′43″N 77°44′00″W

Map
- Location in Panama

Runways
Direction	Length		Surface
Direction	m	ft	Surface
16/34	1,335	4,380	Concrete

Mulatupo Airport (IATA: MPP) is an airport serving the Caribbean island town of Mulatupo, in the Guna Yala comarca (indigenous province) of Panama.

The runway is on an island 1.6 kilometres (1 mi) east of the town. Approach and departure to either end of the runway will be over the water.

The La Palma VOR-DME (Ident: PML) is located 40.3 nautical miles (75 km) southwest of the airport.

== See also ==
- Transport in Panama
- List of airports in Panama
