= Pedasí =

Pedasí may refer to:

- Pedasí District, a district of the Los Santos province in Panama
- Pedasí township, Los Santos, a township within the Pedasí District
