= Air Panama =

Regional airline based in Panama

IATA	ICAO	Call sign
7P	PST	AIR PANAMA
- Founded: 1980 (as PARSA)
- Hubs: Albrook "Marcos A. Gelabert" International Airport
- Focus cities: Enrique Malek International Airport
- Frequent-flyer program: Preferential Service
- Subsidiaries: Air Costa Rica
- Fleet size: 8 (As of September 2024)
- Destinations: 5 (As of September 2024)
- Headquarters: Panama City, Panama
- Key people: George Novey (Chairman); Eduardo Stagg (CEO & President)
- Employees: 600 (2015)
- Website: Airpanama.com

Air Panama is a regional airline based at Albrook "Marcos A. Gelabert" International Airport in Panama, and is currently the second-largest air carrier in the country, surpassed only by Copa Airlines. The carrier offers both scheduled and charter passenger flights to more than 31 destinations from its hub at Albrook International Airport.

== History ==
=== Inauguration ===
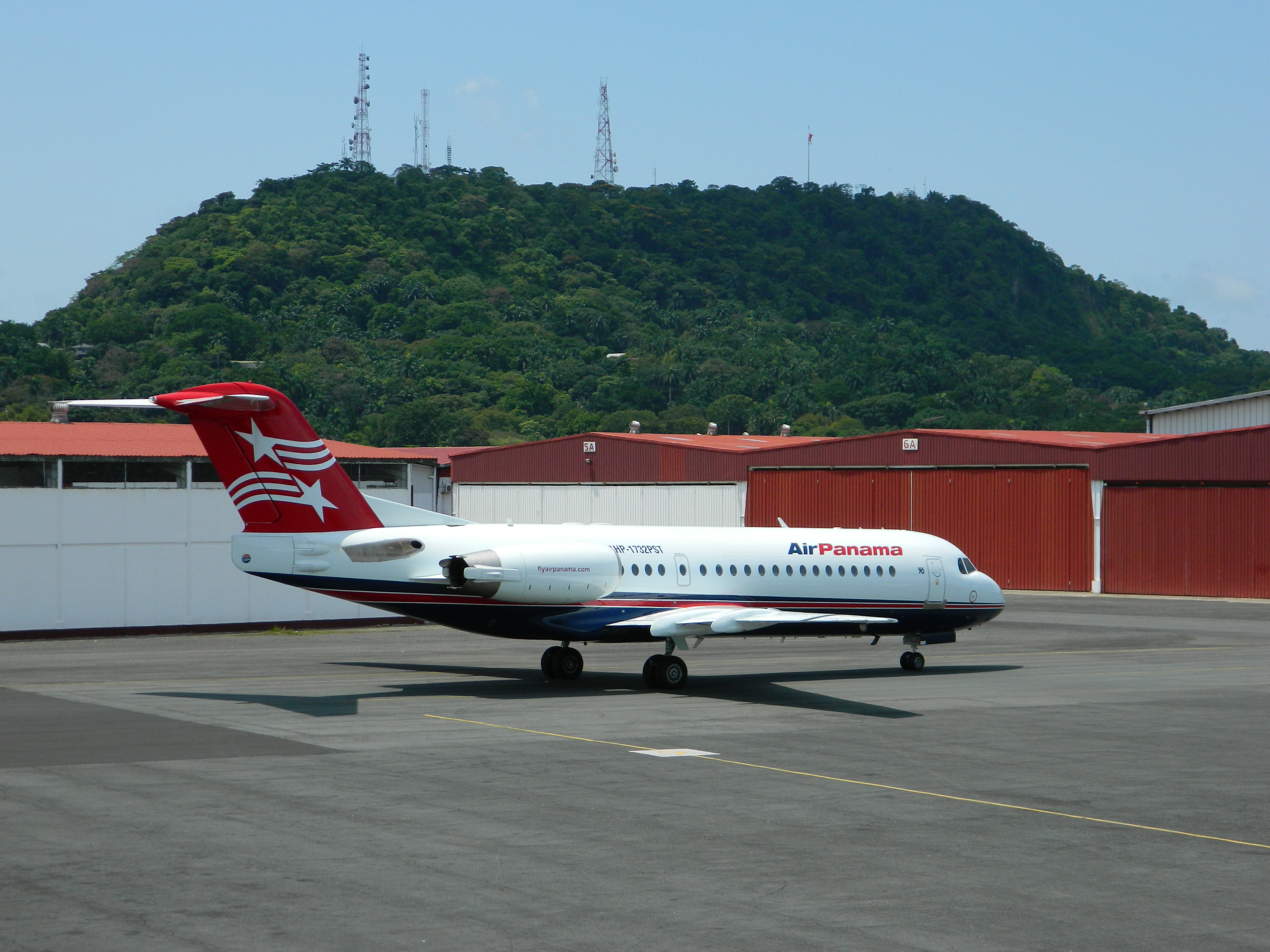
A former Air Panama Fokker 70 parked at Albrook Airport in 2011

The airline was founded in 1980 as PARSA, though certain services were operated as Turismo Aéreo. At the time of its startup, Panama had been ruled by a military dictatorship government since 1968, but together with Aeroperlas, the company became one of the biggest and most prominent airlines in the country. On 20 December 1989, in the wake of the United States invasion of Panama, two Britten-Norman Islander aircraft owned by PARSA were damaged beyond repair in fighting action. Despite this, the airline expanded rapidly to other destinations around Panama and Costa Rica during the 1990s, and began to acquire newer aircraft.

On New Year's Eve 1997, PARSA suffered its first fatal accident when a Britten-Norman Islander crashed into the jungle 6.5 kilometres short of Rio Sidra Airport, Darien, killing all on board.

In January 1999, the airline moved its headquarters to the new Albrook - Marcos A. Gelabert International Airport, when the old airport located at Paitilla was shut down after 70 years of operation. In 2005, the Air Panama trademark rights were acquired. The name had been unused since the demise of Air Panamá Internacional in January 1990, and PARSA formally adopted the new name that year.

=== Expansion years ===
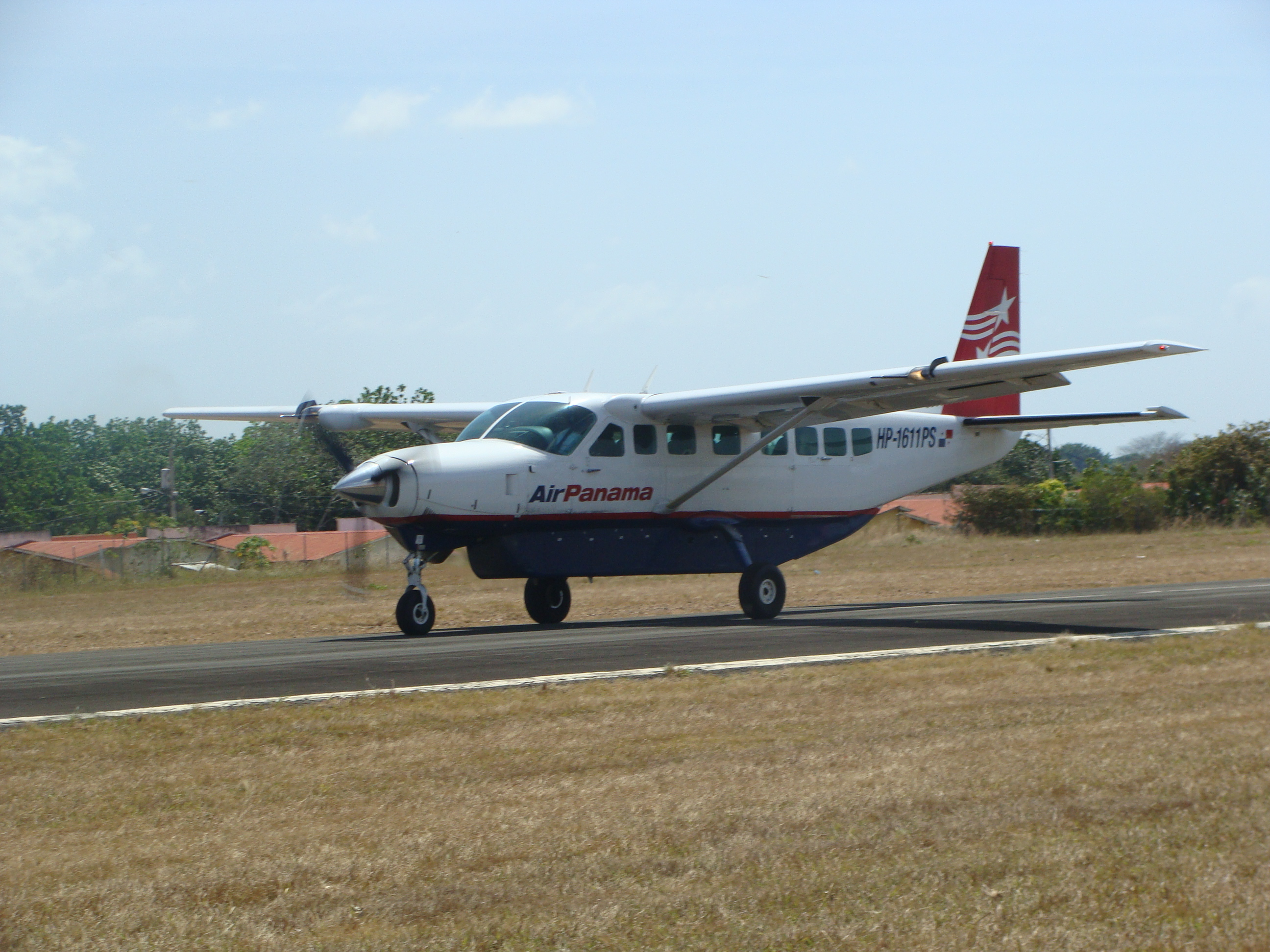
An Air Panama Cessna 208 Caravan, used primarily on regional routes across Panama

After the purchase of the trademark rights in 2005, Chairman George Novey unveiled on a Fokker F-27 aircraft PARSA's new identity Air Panama. Shortly afterward, the airline introduced new scheduled services to other regional destinations around Panama and began to acquire turboprop aircraft such as the Saab 340 and the Bombardier Dash 8-300 series, replacing the aging British Aerospace Jetstream 31 and Fokker F27 Friendship fleet.

In 2009, Air Panama reached a historic milestone when it transported its one millionth passenger. That same year, the airline entered the jet age when it acquired two Fokker 70s. In 2011, Air Panama bought two used Fokker 50s previously owned by Scandinavian Airlines System and transported around 172,154 people. In January 2012, Air Panama announced a codeshare agreement with Copa Airlines, Panama's flag carrier and largest airline, linking all tourist destinations within Panama with several in Latin America. The agreement became effective five months later when the company started charter regional flights to Isla Colon from Tocumen International Airport. As of 2016, this codeshare is no longer active.

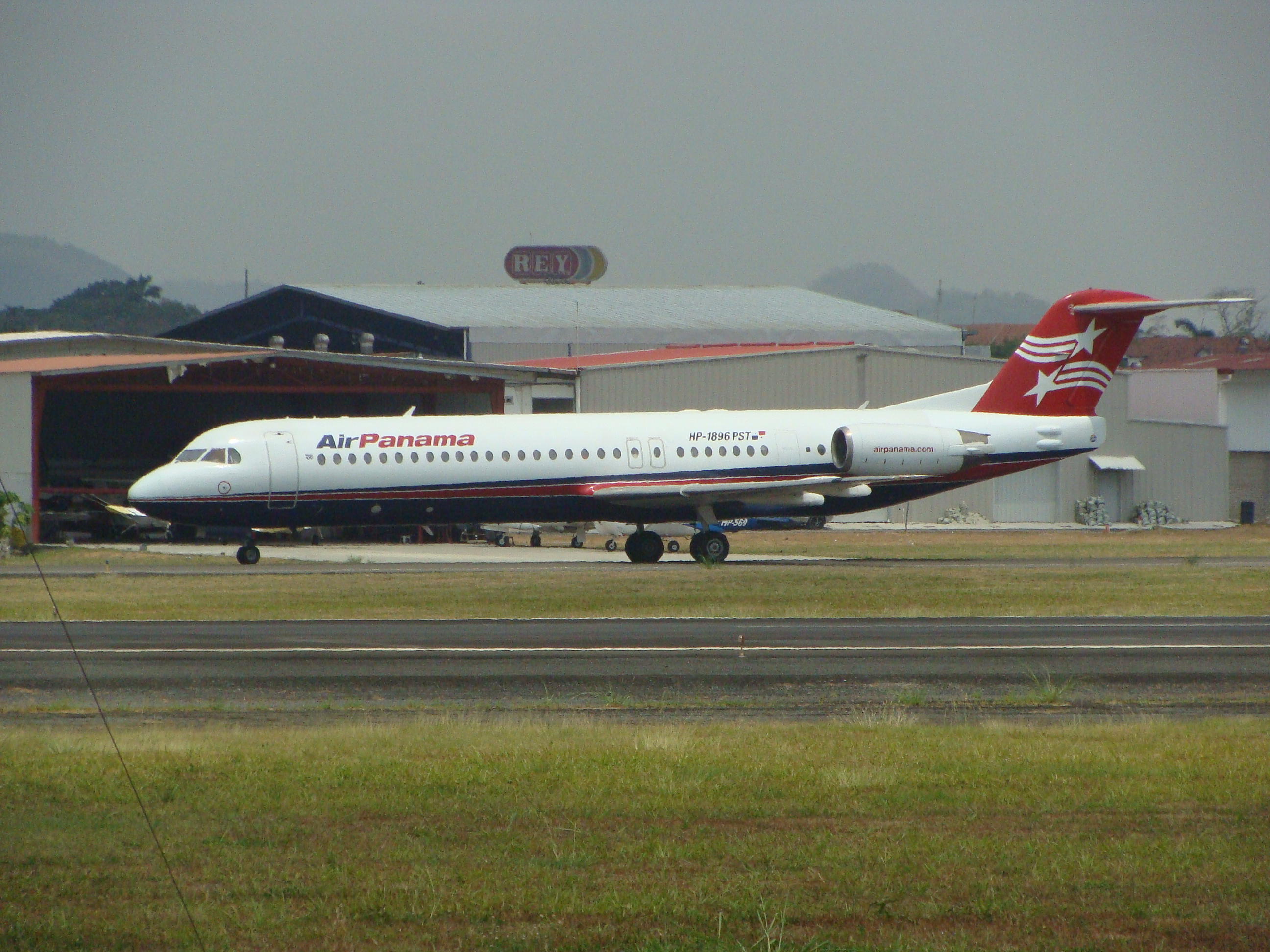
A former Air Panama Fokker 100, mainly deployed for short-medium haul routes

On 29 February 2012, domestic competitor Aeroperlas Regional ceased operations due to financial troubles, leaving Air Panama as the sole regional carrier in the country. The same month, the airline expressed an interest in initiating a non-stop international route from Panama to the Cayman Islands, using jet-powered aircraft. In anticipation for these flights, Air Panama ordered two Fokker 100 aircraft, receiving the first one in June and the second two months later. As of February 2015, the planned service to the Cayman Islands is on standstill. Almost six months after Aeroperlas' bankruptcy, Air Panama assumed all of its domestic routes.

In November 2012, Air Panama launched an updated version of its website (www.airpanama.com), with a new operational system that allowed travelers to purchase tickets in real time and to see flight schedules and status. It was the first time the airline had extensively overhauled its website since its official rebranding in 2006.

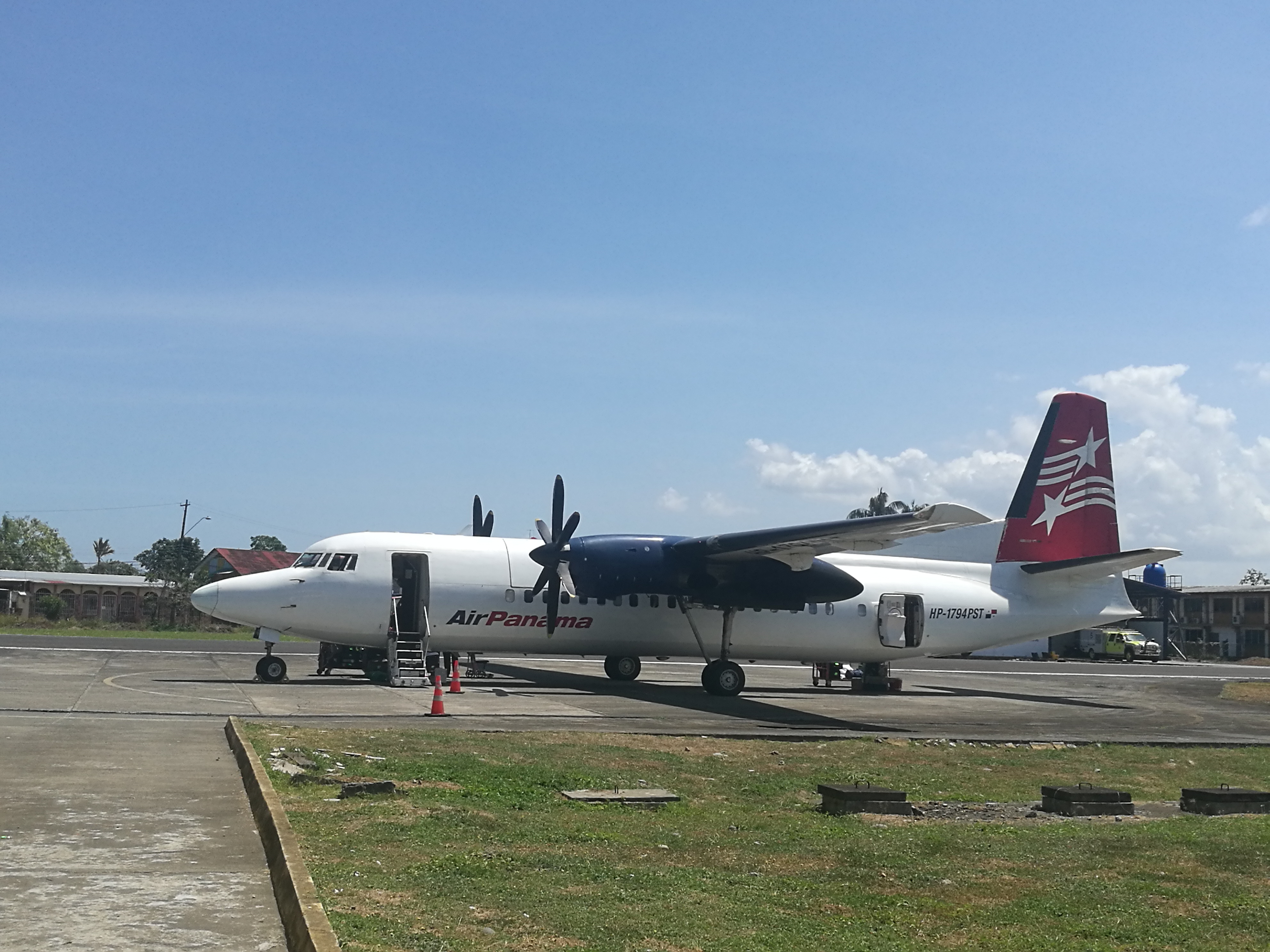
An Air Panama Fokker 50 at Changuinola "Capitán Manuel Niño" International Airport in 2019

In 2013, Air Panama sold the two Fokker 70s in favour of more spacious Fokker 100s. Between August and November of the same year, the airline acquired two Boeing 737-300s as part of a strategic expansion plan into the international market, which started with the launch of scheduled commercial services to Medellín, Colombia, in June 2014.

In 2015, the airline added three more Fokker 100 aircraft. In July 2015, the airline began daily non-stop flights from Panama to San José, Costa Rica. Services to Costa Rica from David, Chiriqui are still maintained. On December 1, of the same year, Air Panama started services to Armenia, its second destination in Colombia.

== Destinations ==
As of January 2026, Air Panama operates scheduled and charter flights to the following domestic destinations in Panama and it also operate international charter flights to Medellin, Colombia

In 2025, it was announced that the airline will resume scheduled international flights from David to San Jose, Costa Rica in 2026 and will operate using Dash-8-Q400 aircraft. The flight was last served until August 2016, leaving the only airport without international flights.

Base
Future
Terminated

Country	City	Airport	Notes
Colombia
Colombia	Armenia	El Edén International Airport	Suspended in February 2019
Colombia	Cartagena	Rafael Núñez International Airport	Suspended in November 2018
Colombia	Medellín	José María Córdova International Airport	Charter
Costa Rica
Costa Rica	San José	Juan Santamaría International Airport	To be resumed
Panama
Panama	Bocas del Toro	Isla Colón International Airport	
Panama	Changuinola	Capitán Manuel Niño International Airport	
Panama	Chitré	Alonso Valderrama Airport	
Panama	David	Enrique Malek International Airport	
Panama	Panama City	Albrook International Airport	Base
Panama	Pedasí	Pedasí Airport	Charter

== Fleet ==
=== Current fleet ===
As of April 2026, Air Panama's fleet consists of the following aircraft:

Air Panama Fleet
Aircraft	In service	Orders	Passengers	Note
Cessna 208B Grand Caravan	1	—	12	
De Havilland Canada Dash 8-400	1	—	76	
Fokker 50	2	—	48	To be replaced by the Dash 8-400
Fokker 50	2	—	50	To be replaced by the Dash 8-400
TOTAL	4	—		

=== Former fleet ===
Air Panama previously operated the following aircraft:

Air Panamá's former fleet
type	Total	Introduced	Retired	Notes
Boeing 737-300QC	2	2013	2016	
British Aerospace Jetstream	1	2005	2006	
Britten-Norman BN-2 Islander	8	2006	2018	
Cessna 182J Skylane	1	Unknown	Unknown	
Cessna U206E Stationair	1	Unknown	Unknown	
De Havilland Canada DHC-6 Twin Otter	2	2004	2019	
De Havilland Canada Dash 8 Q300	1	2007	2011	
Fokker 70	2	2010	2013	
Fokker 100	6	2012	2020	
Fokker F27 Friendship	6	2004	2015	
Fokker F28 Fellowship	3	2010	2019	
Piper PA-34 Seneca	1	2006	2020	
Saab 340	2	2009	2014	

== Accidents and incidents ==
During its history, Air Panama (PARSA) had the following incidents and accidents:

Air Panama Reported Incidents
Flight	Date	Aircraft	Location	Description	Casualties				
Flight	Date	Aircraft	Location	Description	Fatal	Serious	Minor	Uninjured	Ground
N/A	December 31, 1997	Britten-Norman Islander	Near Rio Sidra Airport, San Blas (Gunayala)	On New Year's Eve 1997 at 07:45 local time, a PARSA Britten-Norman Islander (registered HP-986PS) crashed into a jungle area 6.5 kilometres short of Rio Sidra Airport following a flight from Panama City in bad weather conditions. Nine passengers and the pilot lost their lives. It was the first crash since the foundation of the company in 1980.	10	0	0	0	0
N/A	December 29, 2002	Britten-Norman Islander	Over the Caribbean Sea, near Bocas Del Toro	On 29 December 2002 at 16:06 local time, ATC lost contact with a PARSA Britten-Norman Islander (registered HP-1016PS) during an empty ferry flight from Bocas del Toro to Panama City, while the aircraft was over the Caribbean Sea. The aircraft and its pilot were never found.	1	0	0	0	0
680	June 1, 2006	Jetstream 31	Bocas del Toro "Isla Colón" International Airport	On 1 June 2006 at 07:55 local time, a British Aerospace Jetstream (registered HP-1477PST) skidded and overshot the runway upon landing in heavy rain at Bocas del Toro "Isla Colón" International Airport after a scheduled flight from Panama City. The aircraft was substantially damaged. The 16 passengers and two crew members evacuated the aircraft without any injuries. The plane was written off.	0	0	0	16	0
980	October 31, 2007	Fokker F27-200	Albrook "Marcos A. Gelabert" International Airport	On 31 October 2007 at 20:40 UTC, a Fokker F27 Friendship (registered HP-1541PST) bound for Bocas del Toro "Isla Colón" International Airport for a scheduled passenger flight, veered off the runway at Albrook "Marcos A. Gelabert" International Airport. All nine passengers and four crew members evacuated the aircraft without injuries. The aircraft was written off.	0	0	0	9	0
7P982	May 17, 2025	Fokker 50	Bocas del Toro "Isla Colón" International Airport	On May 17, 2025, at 2:01 UTC, a Fokker 50 (registered HP-1899PST) in a scheduled flight from Panama City landed on Bocas del Toro "Isla Colón" International Airport and veered off the runway. The aircraft sustained heavy damage and was written off. The 35 passengers and three crew members evacuated the aircraft without any major injuries.	0	0	12	26	0

== See also ==
- List of airlines of Panama
