= Cap. Alonso Valderrama Airport =

Alonso Valderrama Airport
- IATA: CTD; ICAO: MPCE

Summary
- Airport type: Public
- Serves: Chitré, Panama
- Elevation AMSL: 33 ft / 10 m
- Coordinates: 7°59′15″N 80°24′35″W

Map
- Location of the airport in Panama

Runways
Direction	Length		Surface
Direction	m	ft	Surface
01/19	1,500	4,921	Asphalt
- Source: Google Maps GCM SkyVector

Alonso Valderrama Airport (IATA: CTD, ICAO: MPCE) is an airport serving Chitré, a city in the Herrera Province of Panama. The airport is 2 kilometres (1.2 mi) northeast of the city, and 1.6 kilometres (1 mi) inland from the Gulf of Panama.

The Alonso Valderrama non-directional beacon (Ident: CHE) is located on the field. The Santiago VOR-DME (Ident: STG) is located 32.1 nautical miles (59 km) west of the airport.

== Airline and destination ==
Airlines	Destinations
Air Panama	Panama City–Gelabert

== See also ==
- Transport in Panama
- List of airports in Panama
