= CHX =

Chx may refer to:

- Chamonix, a town in the French Alps
- Chancellor of the Exchequer
- Chicago Stock Exchange
- Charing Cross railway station (National Rail code) in London
- Chlorhexidine: A disinfectant and topical anti-infective agent used also as mouthwash to prevent oral plaque
- CHX, the IATA airport code for Changuinola "Capitán Manuel Niño" International Airport in Changuinola, Panama
- Cycloheximide, an inhibitor of protein biosynthesis in eukaryotic cells
