= Miraflores Airport, Darién =

Airport in Panama

Miraflores Airport
- IATA: none; ICAO: MPMF

Summary
- Serves: La Palma
- Elevation AMSL: 33 ft / 10 m
- Coordinates: 8°20′20″N 78°07′55″W

Map
- Location of the airport in Panama

Runways
| Direction | Length | | Surface |
| Direction | m | ft | Surface |
|---|---|---|---|
| 15/33 | 735 | 2,411 | Asphalt |
- Sources: GCM Bing Maps SkyVector

Miraflores Airport (ICAO: MPMF) is an airport serving La Palma, a port town and the capital of the Darién Province of Panama. The airport is 7 kilometres (4.3 mi) south of La Palma, and replaces the closed Captain Ramon Xatruch Airport.

The La Palma VOR (Ident: PML) is 4.1 nautical miles (7.6 km) north of the airport. There is rising terrain to the west.

== See also ==
- Transport in Panama
- List of airports in Panama
