= Capitán Manuel Niño Airport =

Airport in Bocas del Toro Province, Panama

Changuinola "Capitan Manuel Niño" International Airport Aeropuerto Internacional de Changuinola "Capitán Manuel Niño"
- IATA: CHX; ICAO: MPCH

Summary
- Airport type: Public
- Operator: Autoridad Aeronáutica Civil
- Serves: Changuinola, Panama
- Elevation AMSL: 19 ft / 6 m
- Coordinates: 9°27′32″N 82°32′55″W

Map
- Location in Panama

Runways
| Direction | Length | | Surface |
| Direction | m | ft | Surface |
|---|---|---|---|
| 03/21 | 1,100 | 3,609 | Asphalt |
- Sources: Panama CAA, WAD GCM Google Maps SkyVector

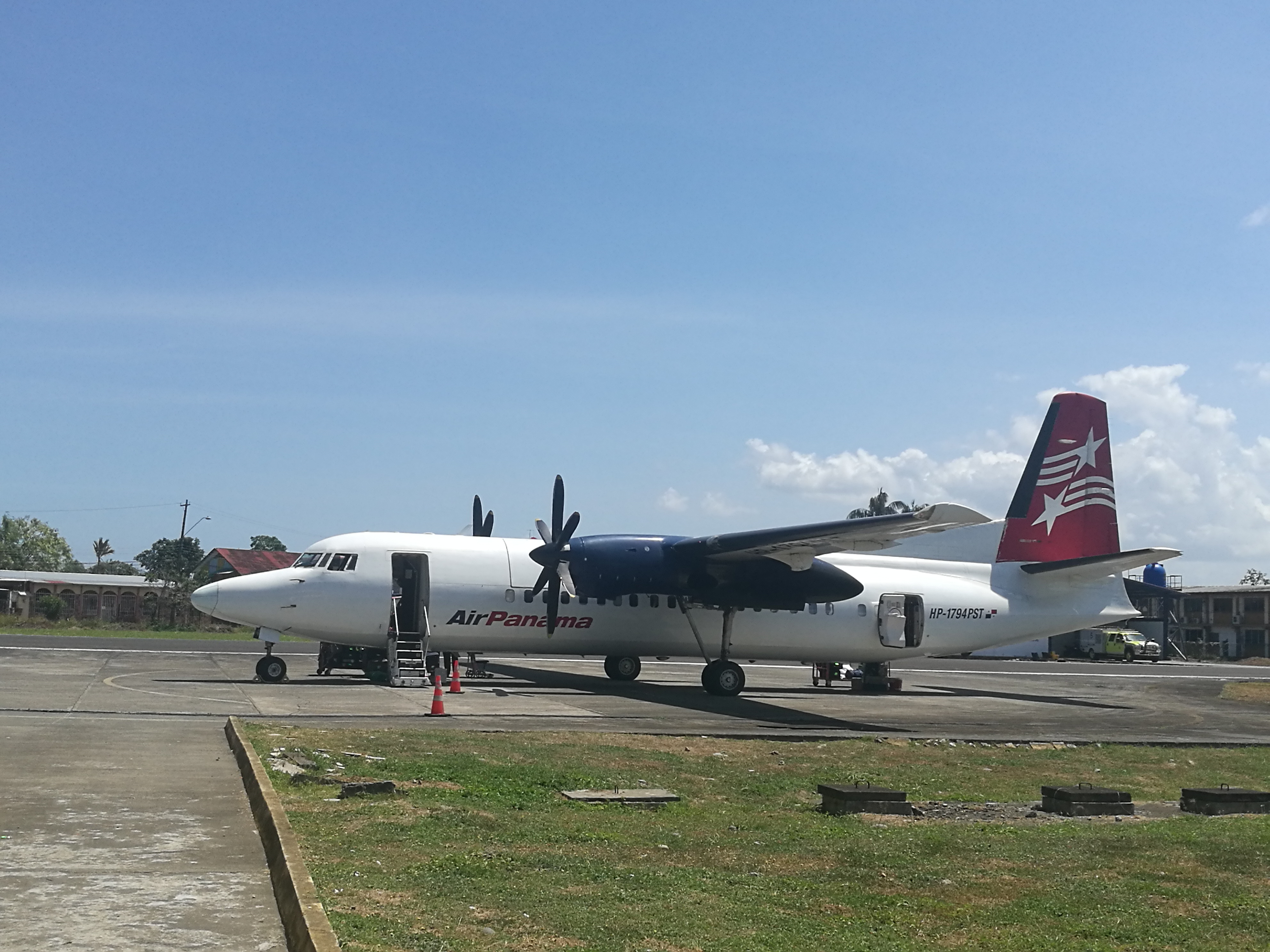
Air Panama Fokker F50 at Changuinola Manuel Niño International Airport

Changuinola "Capitan Manuel Niño" International Airport (Spanish: Aeropuerto Internacional de Changuinola "Capitán Manuel Niño") (IATA: CHX, ICAO: MPCH) is an airport serving Changuinola, the capital of the Changuinola District in the Bocas del Toro Province in Panama. The name is in honor of the first Panamanian pilot.

== Facilities ==
The airport is in an agricultural region 6 kilometres (4 mi) inland from the Caribbean coast, and 10 kilometres (6 mi) east of the border with Costa Rica.

The airport resides at an elevation of 19 ft (5.8 m) above mean sea level. It has one runway designated 03/21 with an asphalt surface measuring 1,100 m × 25 m (3,609 ft × 82 ft).

The Bocas Del Toro VOR-DME (Ident: BDT) is located 17.2 nautical miles (32 km) east-southeast of the airport. The Limon VOR-DME (Ident: LIO) is located 42.8 nautical miles (79 km) northwest of airport.

The Airport terminal is a two-story building, similar to the Enrique Malek International Airport terminal building. The ground floor has a waiting area, bathrooms, cafeteria, and space for three regional carriers offices. The second floor has administrative offices and other government agency offices. Next to the terminal, there is an air traffic control tower, Bocas Fruit Co., and ATOPAN (aerial fumigation) hangars.

== Airlines and destinations ==
| Airlines | Destinations |
|---|---|
| Air Panama | Panama City–Gelabert |

== See also ==
- Transport in Panama
- List of airports in Panama
