= Marcos A. Gelabert International Airport =

Marcos A. Gelabert International Airport Aeropuerto Internacional Marcos A. Gelabert
- IATA: PAC; ICAO: MPMG

Summary
- Airport type: Public
- Operator: Panama Civil Aviation Authority
- Serves: Panama City, Panama
- Opened: 1932
- Elevation AMSL: 31 ft (9.4 m)
- Coordinates: 8°58′24″N 79°33′20″W
- Website: aeronautica.gob.pa

Map
- Location in Panama

Runways
Direction	Length		Surface
Direction	m	ft	Surface
01/19	1,800	5,906	Asphalt

Statistics (2011)
- Passengers (Annual): 289,197
- Sources: Stats, CAA WAD GCM SkyVector

Marcos A. Gelabert International Airport (Spanish: Aeropuerto Internacional Marcos A. Gelabert) (IATA: PAC, ICAO: MPMG) is a public airport located 1.5 kilometres (0.93 mi; 0.81 nmi) west of the center of Panama City, in the Panamá Province of Panama. It is on the site of the former Albrook Air Force Station. Previously, the airport was located in the area of Paitilla Punta Paitilla, operating approximately 70 years until January 1999, when the airport moved operations to Albrook. The name was changed to honor the Panamanian aviator Marcos A. Gelabert, whose contributions to Panamanian aviation included founding Panama's first airline and first school for training pilots.

Flytrip offers daily flights to bocas del toro, pedasi and contadora from Albrook Airport. Its corporate headquarters are located on the airport property.

Air Panama offers daily flights to many cities in Panama and other countries from Albrook Airport. Its corporate headquarters are located on the airport property.

== History ==
After World War I, it became apparent to military planners that air power, especially naval air power, constituted a serious threat to the safety of the Panama Canal. The one existing airfield (France Field) was too small, had a poor landing surface, offered no room for expansion, and provided little defense for the Pacific entrance to the canal. Construction for an air base at Albrook Field was authorized by Congress in 1928, and $1.9 million was appropriated. Actual construction began in 1930 and most works were completed in 1932. Albrook Army Airfield was commissioned in April 1932 as an active air field.

The original construction program at Albrook left out several buildings necessary for efficient flight operations, including a headquarters building. As money could be secured throughout the 1930s, seven buildings were added to the base. In addition, the runways were unsuitable for all-weather flying and had to be improved.

By the mid-1930s, advances in naval aviation (primarily aircraft carriers) and increasingly long-range bombers had again made plain the inadequacies of air defense of the canal. Plans to significantly expand Air Corps strength had been around since 1934, essentially proposing a system of outlying bases supported by pursuit and bombardment aircraft. It was 1939, however, before these plans began to be realized. Congressional authorization and $50 million in funding were forthcoming that year for improving the canal defenses. Since a large part of the expansion program was a vast increase in manpower, much of the new construction involved housing at existing bases. In addition, a new airfield (Howard Field) was authorized for the west bank of the Pacific entrance to the canal. The majority of the expansion program construction was completed by early 1942.

After the Japanese attack on Pearl Harbor in December 1941, the number of troops in Panama was sharply increased. The newly established Caribbean Defense Command carried out its mission of canal defense through a widespread net of naval and air reconnaissance, with the greatest threat coming from German U-boats. By April 1943, the threat to the canal was diminishing, defense status was downgraded, and a reduction in troop strength began.

Albrook Field became Albrook Air Force Base on March 26, 1948, by the Department of the Air Force General Order Number 10.

AAFES operated an "Albrook Mall" in various buildings, that was one of the primary shopping areas available to US troops stationed there (not just Air Force). In 1966, elements of the USAF's 4080th Strategic Reconnaissance Wing flew Lockheed U-2 aircraft from the base to perform atmospheric sampling as the French detonated a nuclear device in the South Pacific.

In 1975 the facility was downgraded to Albrook Air Force Station when the control tower was closed and Air Force aircraft and units moved to Howard Air Force Base.

In 1977, the Torrijos–Carter Treaties, transferring the land surrounding the Panama Canal from the United States to Panama, were signed. The airstrip and adjacent hangars and buildings (Albrook Army Airfield) were transferred to the government of Panama on October 1, 1979, along with the adjacent PAD (Panama Air Depot) Area.

The base saw action again during the 1989 United States invasion of Panama, including an extended firefight at its front gate.

The station was turned over to the Government of Panama on 30 September 1997 as a result of the Torrijos-Carter Treaties and was subsequently vacated by the U.S. Department of Defense.

== Airlines and destinations ==
Airlines	Destinations
Air Panama	Bocas del Toro, Changuinola, Chitré, David; Charter: Achutupo, Bahía Piña, Colon, Contadora, El Porvenir, El Real, Isla San José, Jaqué, Medellín-JMC, Pedasí, Puerto Obaldia, Uggubseni, Ustupu
Flytrip	Bocas del Toro, Contadora, Pedasí; Charter: Coiba, Colon, Corazón de Jesús, David, El Porvenir, El Real, Río Hato, Santiago, Tubualá

== Ground transportation ==
The airport is served by city buses.

== See also ==
- List of airports in Panama
- Transport in Panama
- Tocumen International Airport, a larger airport located to the east of Panama City.
