= Cnel. Raúl Arias Espinoza Airport =

Airport on Contadora Island, Panama

Raul Arias Espinoza Airport Contadora Airport
- IATA: OTD; ICAO: MPRA

Summary
- Airport type: Public
- Serves: Contadora Island, Panama
- Elevation AMSL: 43 ft / 13 m
- Coordinates: 8°37′43″N 79°02′04″W

Map
- Location of the airport in Panama

Runways
Direction	Length		Surface
Direction	m	ft	Surface
18/36	700	2,297	Asphalt
- Source: SkyVector Google Maps

Raul Arias Espinoza Airport (Spanish: Aeropuerto de Contadora) (IATA: OTD, ICAO: MPRA) is a domestic airport serving Contadora Island, in Panama's Pearl Islands archipelago.

The runway crosses the width of the island. Approaches to either end are over the water. There is a tight parking apron on the north end.

The Taboga Island VOR-DME (Ident: TBG) is located 32.7 nautical miles (61 km) west-northwest of the airport. The Tocumen VOR-DME (Ident: TUM) is located 33.4 nautical miles (62 km) northwest of the airport.

== Airlines and destinations ==
Airlines	Destinations
Flytrip	Panama City–Gelabert

== See also ==
- Transport in Panama
- List of airports in Panama
