= Captain Ramon Xatruch Airport =

Airport in Panama

- IATA: PLP; ICAO: MPMF

Summary
- Airport type: Closed
- Serves: La Palma
- Elevation AMSL: 30 ft / 9 m
- Coordinates: 8°24′25″N 78°08′30″W

Map
- Location of the airport in Panama

Runways
| Direction | Length | | Surface |
| Direction | ft | m | Surface |
|---|---|---|---|
Closed
- Sources: OurAirports GCM Bing Maps

Captain Ramon Xatruch Airport (IATA: PLP, ICAO: MPMF) was an airport serving La Palma, a port town and the capital of the Darién Province of Panama. The runway is now the main street for the town, with buildings lining both sides.

La Palma is now served by Miraflores Airport, 7 kilometres (4 mi) to the south.

La Palma still hosts the La Palma VOR (Ident: PML) which is atop a hill in the center of the town.

== See also ==
- Transport in Panama
- List of airports in Panama
