= El Porvenir Airport =

Airport in Panama

- IATA: PVE; ICAO: MPVR

Summary
- Airport type: Public
- Serves: El Porvenir, Panama
- Elevation AMSL: 10 ft / 3 m
- Coordinates: 9°33′30″N 78°56′50″W

Map
- Location of the airport in Panama

Runways
Direction	Length		Surface
Direction	m	ft	Surface
05/23	600	1,969	Asphalt
- Source: HERE Maps GCM SkyVecttor

El Porvenir Airport (IATA: PVE, ICAO: MPVR) was an airport serving El Porvenir, in Panama. The airport is on an island 2 kilometres (1.2 mi) east of the mainland, in the archipelago bordering the Gulf of San Blas. All approaches and departures will be over the water.

The Tocumen VOR-DME (Ident: TUM) is located 40.6 nautical miles (75 km) southwest of the airport.

== See also ==
- Transport in Panama
- List of airports in Panama
