= Enrique Geenzier =

Panamanian writer, politician and diplomat

- Born: June 12, 1887; Chitré, Panama
- Died: September 21, 1943 (aged 56); Colón, Panama

Juan Enrique Geenzier (June 12, 1887 – September 21, 1943) was a self-taught Panamanian writer, politician, and diplomat.

In 1916, he won the Natural Flower (Flor Natural) prize at the Floral Games. Geenzier ran the literary magazine Esto y Aquello. He served as a diplomat in Costa Rica, New York, and Venezuela. He also was Secretary of External Relations and the governor of Colon.

Though some romanticism is apparent in Geenzier's poetry, its predominant impulse is modernism; its sentimentality is often somewhat ironic. Demetrio Korsi wrote of Geenzier in his Antología de Panamá: "In his moments of true inspiration, he is simply exquisite."

== Works ==
- Crepúsculos y sombras (1916)
- La tristeza del vals (1921)
- Corazón adentro (poems from 1916-1925)
- Poesías (1933)
- Sangre (1936)
- Viejo y Nuevo (1943).
