= Muladub =

Mulatupo Muladub
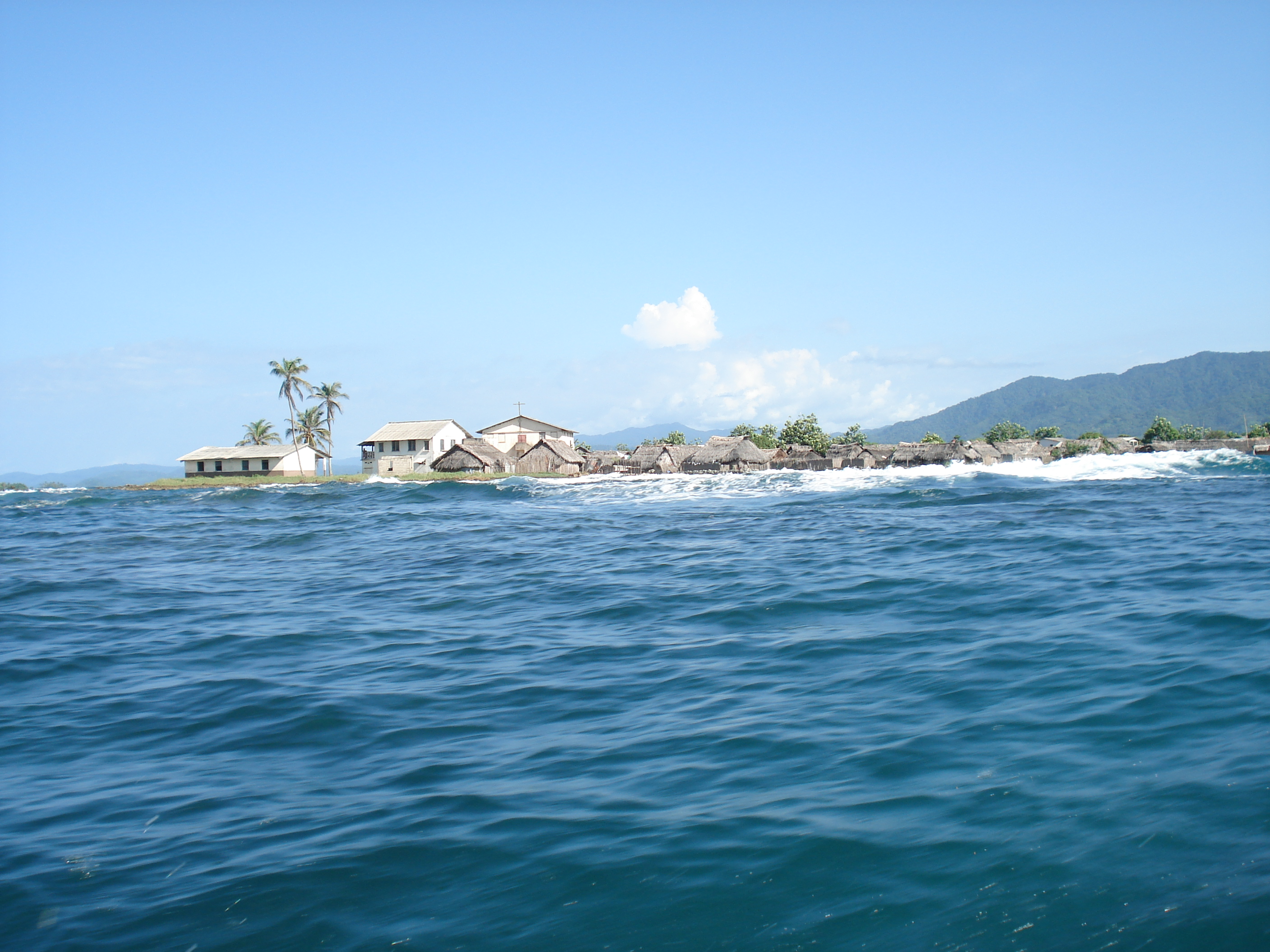
- Mulatupo

- Location within Panama
- Coordinates: 8°57′0″N 77°45′0″W
- Country: Panama
- Province: Kuna Yala
- Municipality: Tubualá

Population (1968)
  - Total: 1,399
  - Estimate (2025): 1,300

Mulatupo is a town in the Kuna Yala province of Panama. The town lies in the island of Muladub and shares it with town of Sasardi Muladub.

== Transportation ==
The village is served by the Mulatupo Airport (IATA: MPP).
