= Enrique Malek International Airport =

Airport in Panama

Enrique Malek International Airport Aeropuerto Internacional Enrique Malek
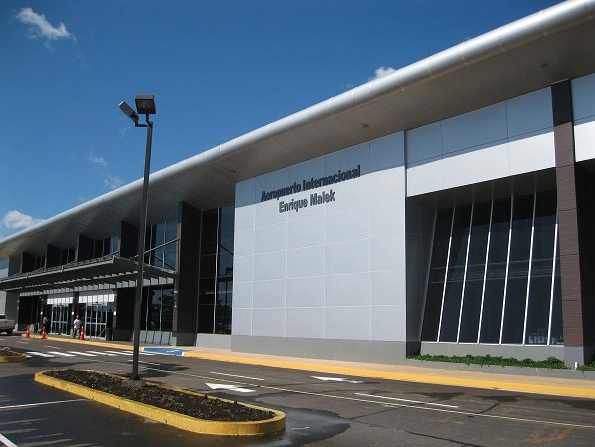
- IATA: DAV; ICAO: MPDA

Summary
- Airport type: Public
- Owner: Tocumen S.A.
- Serves: David Sur, Panama
- Focus city for: Air Panama, Copa Airlines
- Elevation AMSL: 89 ft / 27 m
- Coordinates: 8°23′30″N 82°26′04″W
- Website: enriquemalekinternational.com

Map
- Location within Chiriqui

Runways
Direction	Length		Surface
Direction	m	ft	Surface
04/22	2,600	8,530	Asphalt
- Source: GCM SkyVector

Enrique Malek International Airport (Spanish: Aeropuerto Internacional Enrique Malek) (IATA: DAV, ICAO: MPDA) is an international airport serving David Sur, a city in the Chiriquí Province of Panama.

During heavy travel times, the airport registers 900 operations monthly, serving approximately 20,000 passengers from Mexico, the United States, Canada and Central America.

== Facilities and expansion ==
The airport is on the south side of the city, 4 kilometres (2 mi) from downtown.

In early 2009, the Chiriqui regional director for the Authority of Civil Aeronautics (AAC), Inés de Esquivel, informed La Estrella: "...in the last five years, $1.5 million in investments have been made for the improvement of various areas at the Enrique Malek airport."

An estimated US$12 million improvement fund was passed by the Panamanian legislature that included runway expansion to allow for heavy aircraft. Additionally, the DAV perimeter fencing, first responders, hospitals, security, baggage claim, and terminal facilities were all included in the expansion. The airport ramp and fueling facilities were expanded between 2008 and 2009. The extension of the runway from 2,100 to 2,600 metres (6,900 to 8,500 ft) began in 2010.

The former terminal was demolished and a new one built. When construction had finished, daily flights from Air Panama began. Also car rentals commenced operations in the new terminal. The international flight terminal receives numerous daily flights from Copa Airlines and Air Panama.

== History ==
Known as David Field or San Jose Field during World War II, the airport was an auxiliary of Howard Field, which is near Panama City. It accommodated a variety of United States Army Air Forces personnel, dedicated for the most part in training and reconnaissance missions over the Southeast Pacific coastline, from Honduras in the north, to Peru in the south as part of the defense of the Panama Canal. Enrique Malek International Airport was first built in 1941 as part of an agreement between the U.S and Panama. Wartime units assigned to the airfield were:

- 397th Bombardment Squadron (6th Bombardment Group), 11 December 1941 – 18 August 1942 (B-18 Bolo, B-17 Flying Fortress)
- 45th Bombardment Squadron (40th Bombardment Group), 13 November 1942 – 18 February 1943 (LB-30 (B-24A) Liberator)
- 3d Bombardment Squadron (VI Bomber Command), 12 March – 1 April 1943; 11 June 1943 – 6 April 1944; 8 December 1944 – 28 October 1945 (B-17 Flying Fortress)

On 4 December 2025. The airport plans to operate international flights to San José, Costa Rica, which will be operated by Air Panama using Dash-8-Q400 aircraft in 2026.

== Airlines and destinations ==
Airlines	Destinations
Air Panama	Panama City–Gelabert
Copa Airlines	Panama City–Tocumen

== See also ==
- Transport in Panama
- List of airports in Panama
