= Tubualá Airport =

Tubualá Airport Aeropuerto de Tubualà
- IATA: TUW; ICAO: MPTU

Summary
- Airport type: Public
- Serves: Tubualá
- Location: Guna Yala Province
- Elevation AMSL: 14 ft (4.3 m)
- Coordinates: 8°55′05″N 77°42′30″W

Map
- Location of the airport in Panama

Runways
Direction	Length		Surface
Direction	m	ft	Surface
15/33	430	1,411	Concrete
- Source: HERE Maps GCM

Tubualá Airport (IATA: TUW, ICAO: MPTU) is an airport serving the island town of Tubualá, in the Guna Yala Province of Panama.

The airport is on an island approximately 1.6 kilometres (1 mi) east of Tubualá. Approaches to either end of the runway are over the water.

The La Palma VOR (Ident: PML) is located 39.8 nautical miles (74 km) south-southwest of the airport.

== See also ==
- Transport in Panama
- List of airports in Panama
