= Albrook Mall =

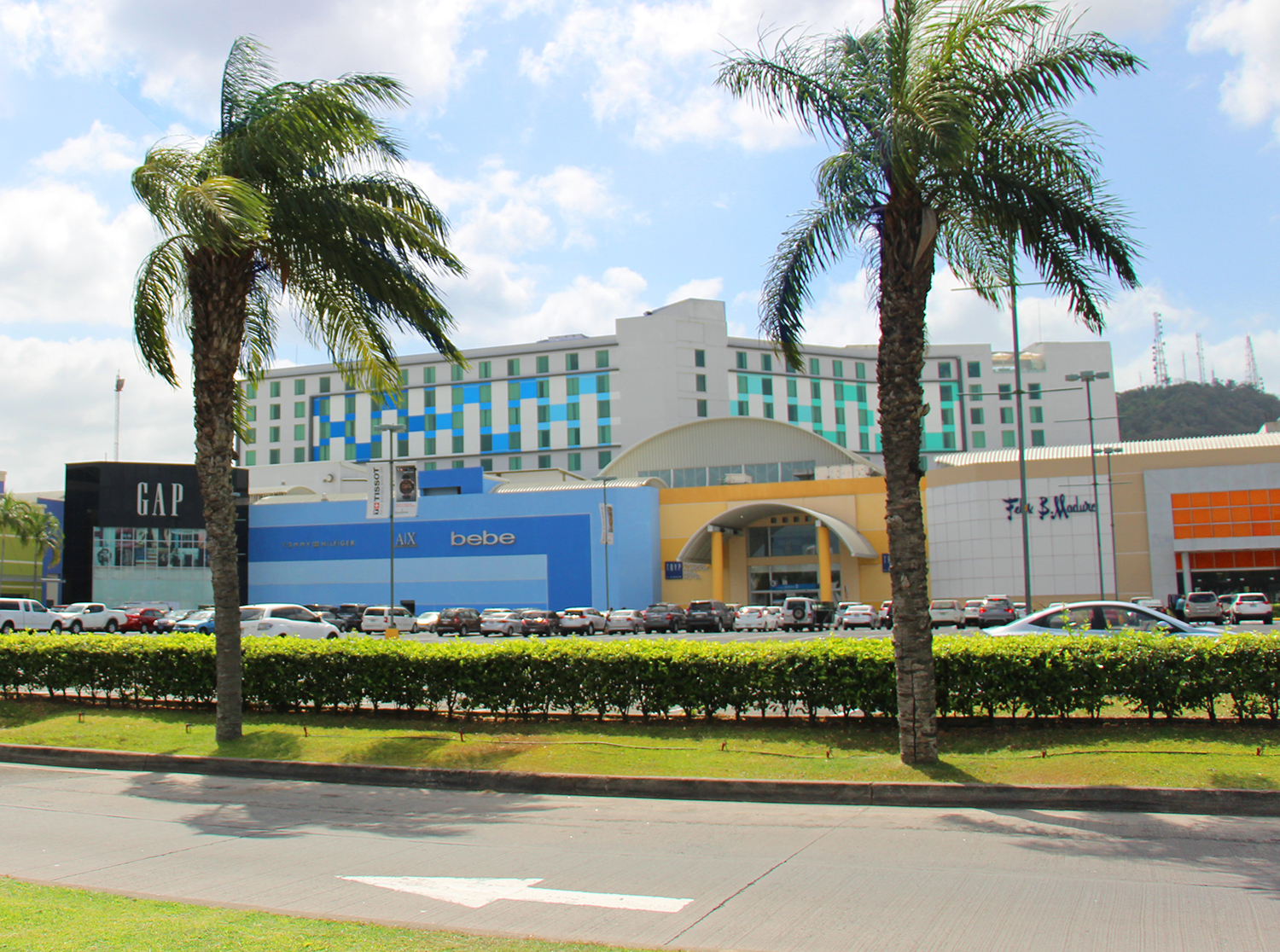
- Near entrance to Pasillo del Koala in Albrook Mall
- Location: Panama City, Panama
- Coordinates: 8.97458°N 79.55233°W
- Address: Avenida Marginal Universidad Nacional de Curundu Albrook Local X-43
- Opened: 2002
- Num. of stores: 700
- Floor area: 380,000 square metres (4,100,000 sq ft)
- Website: www.albrookmall.com

Albrook Mall is a large shopping mall and leisure complex located in Panama City, Panama. As of July 2022 it was the 25th largest mall in the world and second largest in the Americas.

== History ==
The mall was opened in 2002 on the site of Albrook Air Force Base, which had been a United States Air Force base in the former Panama Canal Zone. It is located beside the city's main bus station and the Marcos A. Gelabert domestic airport.

The mall contains about 400 businesses and receives up to 50,000 visitors per day. Approximately 25% of the visitors are foreigners. The mall provides employment for around 10,000 people. Businesses include a cinema, restaurants, supermarkets, clothing retailers, pharmacies, travel agents, hairdressers, fitness center, bowling, and children's play areas.

On 13 March 2013, a fire broke out. While no one was injured, damage was caused to 60 shops, resulting in losses of approximately $ 15 million. The damage was exacerbated by the lack of fire sprinklers, which had not been installed when the mall was opened, since they weren't mandatory at the time of construction.

== Gallery ==
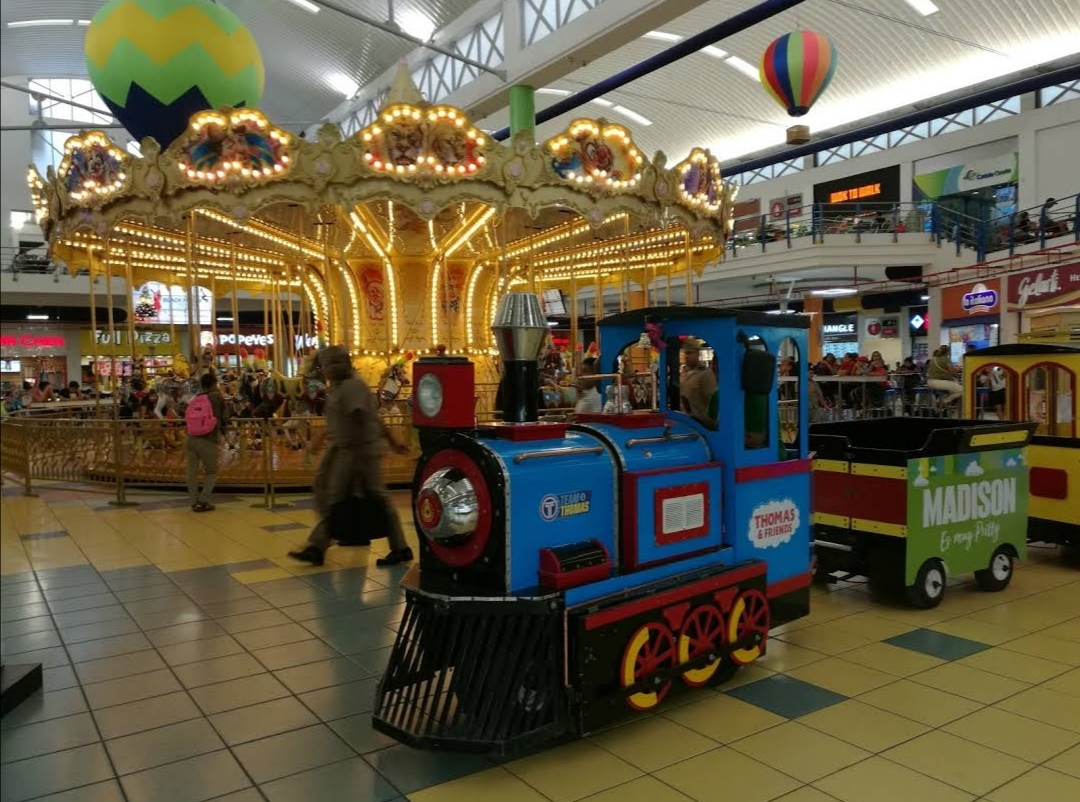
Inside Albrook Mall's main food court

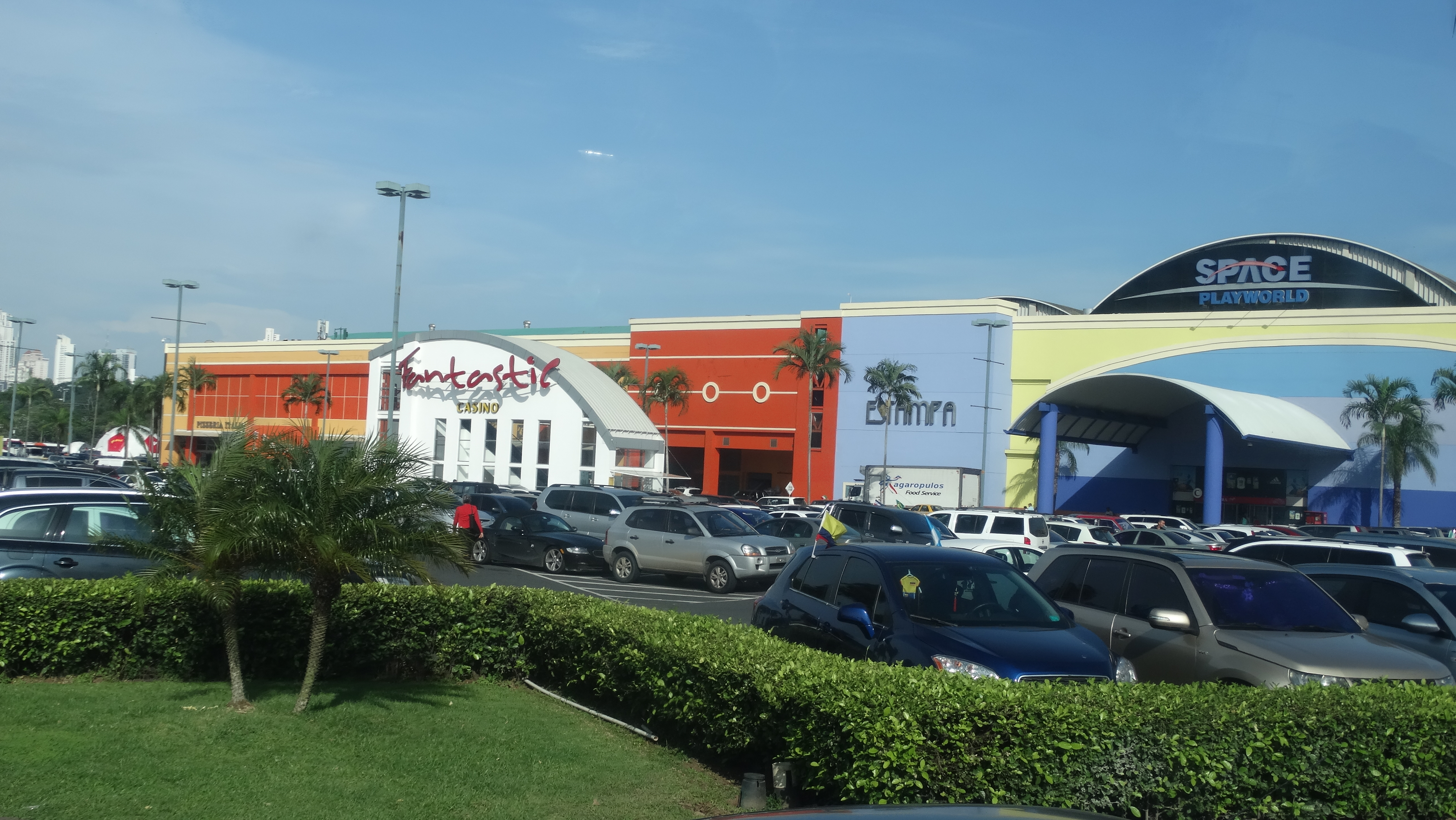
Near main entrance (not visible), 2014
