= Gaigirgordub, Guna Yala =

Gaigirgordub
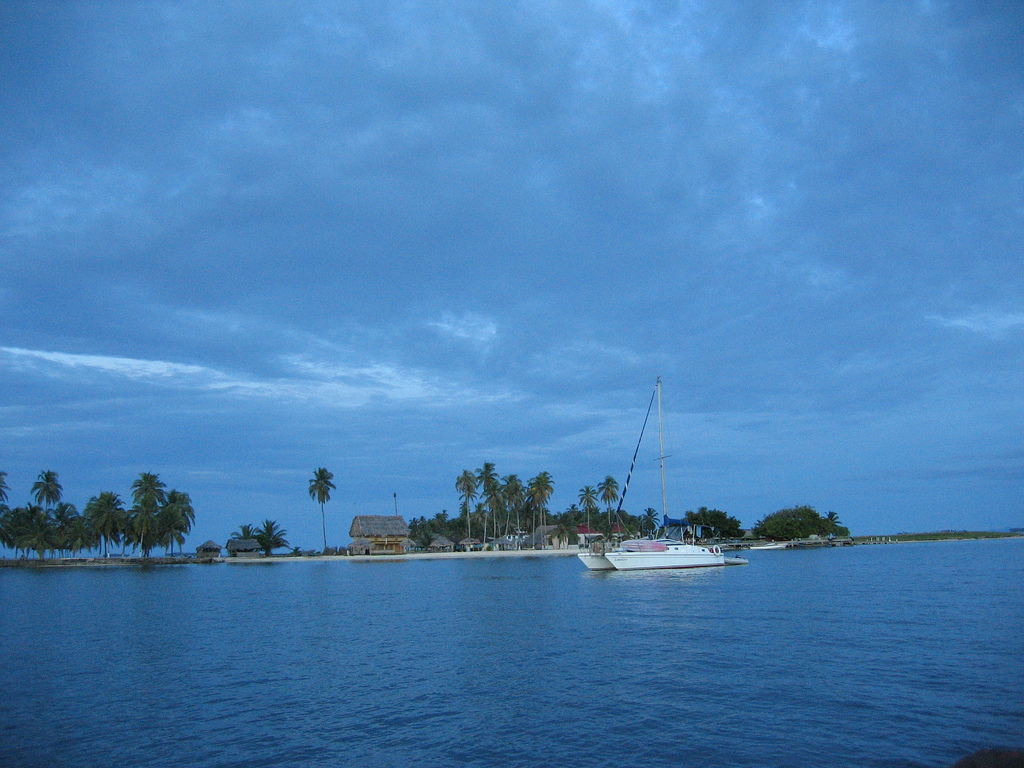

- Location within Guna Yala Location within Panama
- Coordinates: 9.55861°N 78.94844°W
- Country: Panama
- Comarca indígena: Guna Yala
- Time zone: UTC-5

Gaigirgordub, called El Porvenir (Spanish pronunciation: [el poɾ.βeˈniɾ]) until July 1, 2016, is the capital of the Panamanian comarca indígena (indigenous territory) of Guna Yala. The settlement is located on a small island and contains a landing strip, a museum (the Museo de la Nación Guna, or Museum of the Guna Nation), a hotel, government offices, and an artisans' cooperative. There is also a small beach.
