= José Ezequiel Hall International Airport =

Bocas del Toro "José Ezequiel Hall" (Isla Colón) International Airport Aeropuerto Internacional de Bocas del Toro "Isla Colón"
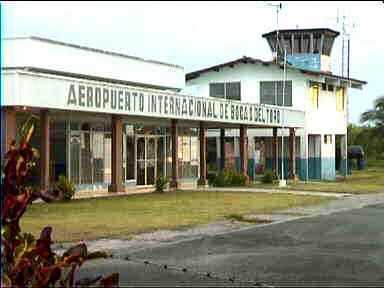
- IATA: BOC; ICAO: MPBO

Summary
- Airport type: Public
- Operator: Autoridad Aeronáutica Civil
- Serves: Bocas del Toro, Isla Colón, Panama
- Elevation AMSL: 10 ft / 3 m
- Coordinates: 9°20′27″N 82°15′00″W
- Website: www.aeronautica.gob.pa

Map
- Location in Panama

Runways
Direction	Length		Surface
Direction	m	ft	Surface
09/27	1,500	4,921	Asphalt
- Sources: CAA WAD GCM

Bocas del Toro "Isla Colón" International Airport (Spanish: Aeropuerto Internacional de Bocas del Toro "Isla Colón") (IATA: BOC, ICAO: MPBO) is a public airport located 1.5 kilometres (1 mi) northwest of the center of Bocas del Toro, a town on Isla Colón (Colón Island) in the Bocas del Toro Province of Panama. The facility is also called José Ezequiel Hall International Airport.

The airport operates from 6:00 AM to 8:00 PM daily. It has a control tower and runway lights. The single runway is aligned in an east–west direction. The airport can accommodate business jets such as Bombardier Global Express, Gulfstreams, Dassault Falcon. The biggest scheduled plane is Air Panama Fokker 50. International arrivals must clear Panamanian customs at the airport.

== Airlines and destinations ==
Airlines	Destinations
Air Panama	Panama City–Gelabert
Flytrip	Panama City–Gelabert
SANSA	Limón, San José-Juan Santamaría

== Weather ==
Bocas del Toro is a tropical coastal destination. The climate is hot and humid. Unlike most of Panama, Bocas does not have a clear wet and dry season. Thunderstorms occur year-round, which will delay flights. Bocas receives large amounts of precipitation.

Climate data for Bocas del Toro, Panama
Month	Jan	Feb	Mar	Apr	May	Jun	Jul	Aug	Sep	Oct	Nov	Dec	Year
Mean daily maximum °F (°C)	87 (31)	89 (32)	90 (32)	89 (32)	86 (30)	85 (29)	84 (29)	84 (29)	84 (29)	83 (28)	83 (28)	84 (29)	86 (30)
Mean daily minimum °F (°C)	71 (22)	73 (23)	74 (23)	75 (24)	74 (23)	73 (23)	73 (23)	73 (23)	73 (23)	72 (22)	72 (22)	72 (22)	73 (23)
Source: Weather Underground

== See also ==
- Transport in Panama
- List of airports in Panama
