= Cap. Justiniano Montenegro Airport =

Pedasí Airport Capt. J. Montenegro Airport
- IATA: PDM; ICAO: MPPD

Summary
- Serves: Pedasí, Panama
- Location: Los Santos Province
- Elevation AMSL: 33 ft (10 m)
- Coordinates: 7°33′25″N 80°01′25″W

Map
- Location of the airport in Panama

Runways
Direction	Length		Surface
Direction	m	ft	Surface
15/33	1,015	3,330	Asphalt
- Source: Google Maps FallingRain GCM

Pedasí Airport (IATA: PDM) is an airport serving the town of Pedasí, in Panama. It parallels the Pacific coastline 2 kilometres (1 mi) north of the town.

It replaces the original Cap. Justiniano Montenegro Airport (ICAO: MPPD), which was 1.6 kilometres (1 mi) northwest of the town.

The Rio Hato VOR-DME (Ident: RHT) is located 49.2 nautical miles (91 km) north of Pedasí Airport.

The airport primarily serves domestic flights.

== Airlines and destinations ==
Airlines	Destinations
Flytrip	Panama City–Gelabert

== See also ==
- Transport in Panama
- List of airports in Panama
