= Chitré =

Chitré Township, District and City
- County and city
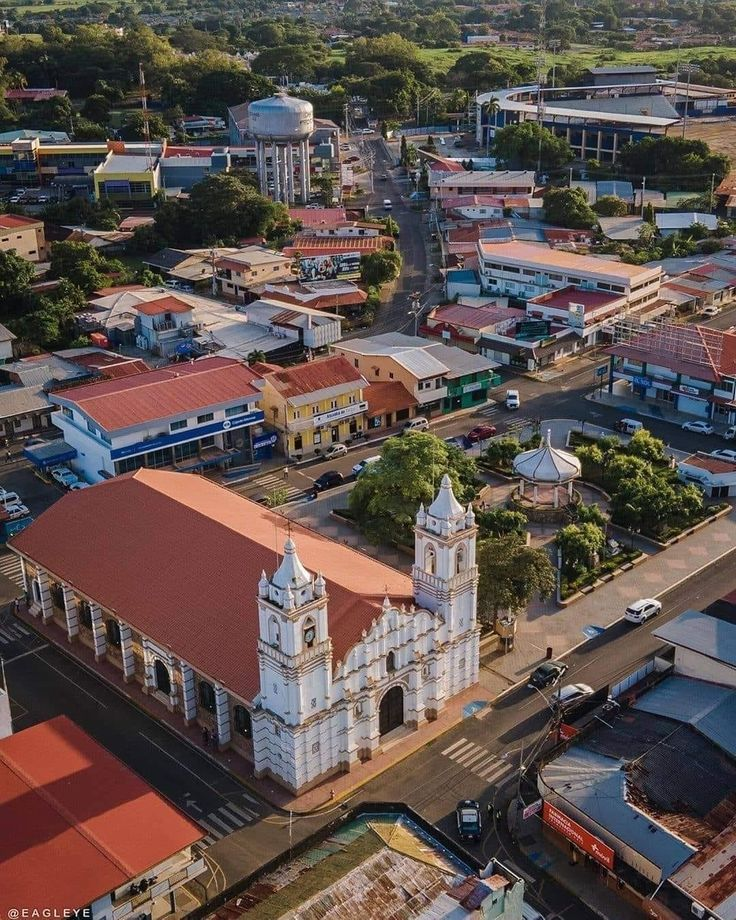
- City of Chitre

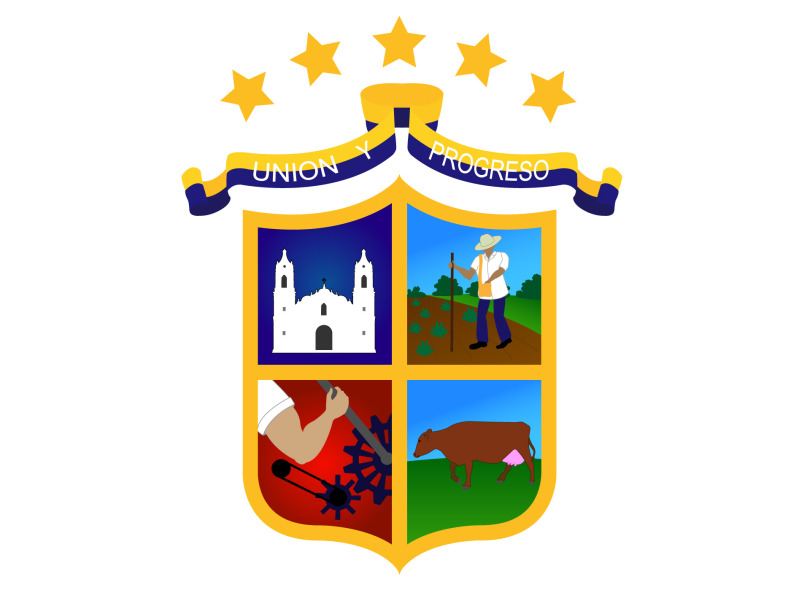
- Flag Coat of arms

- Location within Panama
- Coordinates: 7°58′N 80°26′W
- Country: Panama
- Province: Herrera Province
- Founded: 1848

Government
  - Mayor: Juan Carlos Huerta Solís

Area
  - Land: 12.4 km^{2} (4.8 sq mi)
- Elevation: 24 m (79 ft)

Population (2024)
  - Total: 61,000 Metropolitan Area 100,000
  - Density: 735.5/km^{2} (1,905/sq mi)
- Population density calculated based on land area.
- Time zone: UTC−5 (EST)
- Climate: Aw
- Website: chitre.municipios.gob.pa

Chitré is the capital of the Panamanian province of Herrera. Located in the northeast of the Azuero Peninsula, the district of Chitré has a population of 60,500 inhabitants. At present, approximately 100,000 inhabitants live in the metropolitan area of the city of Chitre, including the small towns of La Villa de Los Santos, Pesé, Parita and other towns. This city is the main commercial hub of the Azuero region and one of the most important cities in the country.

It is known as "The city that grows alone" and "The city where no one is a stranger". The district of the same name is divided into five townships: San Juan Bautista, Llano Bonito, Monagrillo, La Arena and Chitré (main township). Chitré is connected to the Pan-American Highway in the town of Divisa by Avenida Nacional, the main communication axis of the province of Herrera and Los Santos. It preserves a historic center composed of old houses, churches, squares, avenues and parks, along with an important museum heritage. Among the cultural events that are celebrated are the Holy Week of Chitré, the festivities of the patron saint, San Juan Bautista, the Carnival and its founding party. The city of Chitré connects the Azuero region by air with Panama City with direct flights from Alonso Valderrama Airport. This small city connects with its land transport terminal to all the towns in the Azuero region as well as to the capital of the country and nearby cities. As the main city of the Azuero Peninsula, it has the main banking center of the central provinces, restaurants, fast food franchises, car sales companies, supermarkets, hotels, cinemas and shopping centers.

The most important sports stadiums in this city are the Rico Cedeño Stadium, home of Herrerano baseball in the youth and senior championships of Panamanian baseball with a capacity of 5,600 people, and the Los Milagros Soccer Stadium, home of Herrera FC in the first division of the Panamanian soccer league, with a capacity of 1000 fans.

Among its most important infrastructure works are:

- Azuero Convention Center, the largest in the central provinces.
- The road interchange (Bridge, Roundabout and Tunnel) between Carmelo Spadafora and Arnulfo Escalona Avenues.
- The Bike Path to El Agallito Beach Internal Beltway of the City of Chitre Azuero Convention Center Azuero Convention Center Gustavo Nelson Collado Hospital Specialized Clinic of Azuero.

== Geography ==
The natural vegetation of the region is tropical dry forest, although most of the forest has been cut down.

Chitre has a nearby beach called Agallito. During low tide, many types of crabs come out, and thousands of birds of different species come to eat. This makes for an ideal birdwatching and photography condition.

Herrera borders on the north with Cocle, on the south with Los Santos, north/northeast with Veraguas and east with the Pacific Ocean (Parita Bay). The Santa Maria river acts as a border with Cocle while the La Villa river performs the same function on the border with Los Santos. It is located on the Azuero Peninsula, place that shares with Los Santos and part of Veraguas.

The most important towns in Herrera are Chitre, Parita, Ocu, Las Minas, Los Pozos and Santa Maria in that order more or less. It is a very lively place during the yearly carnivals. Herrera, like the other central provinces, is best known for its artisanal products, in particular clay pottery.

== Economy and transportation ==
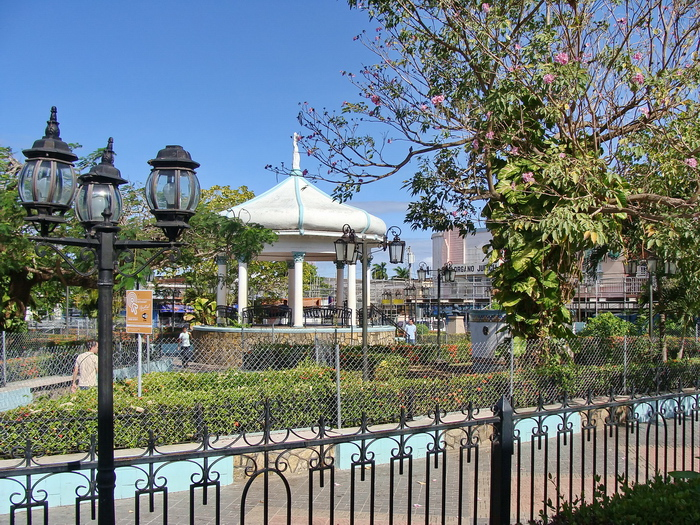
Union Park in Chitré

Chitré has many amenities and conveniences similar to Panama City like: hotels, restaurants with national and international food, banks, stores, internet access, multilevel malls, telecommunication systems, etc. It is one of Panama's highest developed cities and one of the most industrialized ones which provides the country and part of the continent with fuels, meats and clothes.

The city of Chitré "has become the commercial center for the central provinces of the country." Credit cards, such as Visa, MasterCard and American Express are accepted in almost every shopping mall, grocery stores, supermarkets, pharmacies, restaurants, hotels and car rental agencies.

The city has cheaper shops and markets, all located in the city's downtown, along with trading places and sale stores, it also has a plaza and some factories, of service, Heavy and touristic based industry.

There is a large regional bus terminal in Chitré; destinations include Las Minas, Las Tablas, Los Posos, Ocú, Panama City, Pesé, Santiago, and Tonosí. Chitré's small airport offers flights to Panama City on Air Panama.

== Culture ==
The carnival celebrations in the city are well known worldwide. It is one of the most famous in the country and are held every year in February, receiving overseas people and non-residents of the city from other Panama provinces. The Holy Week, Corpus Christi, and St. John the Baptist, patron saint of the city, are also famous celebrations domestically.

Province pride is played every summer in the baseball championships. Chitre hosts whole matches of the province at Rico Cedeno Stadium. The historical success on National championships made it one of the most winning provinces. The last title was obtained in 2007, when Herrera was triple champion from 2005 to 2007.

== Education ==
For much of its history, Chitré did not have its own elementary school. In these times, classes (separated by gender) were taught in rented houses in the town. The Chitré School (Escuela de Chitré), later called Republic of Bolivia School (Escuela República de Bolivia), was built in 1928 using funds contributed by the Panamanian government and by local residents. In 1934, the building that would house the prestigious Tomás Herrera School (Escuela Tomás Herrera) was built. The parish priest, Presbyter Melitón Martín Villalta, blessed the ceremony. The school's first director was Arcadio Castillero. The Hipólito Pérez Tello School (Escuela Hipólito Pérez Tello), also an elementary school, operated in the Tomás Herrera building in its early days.

The José Daniel Crespo School (Colegio José Daniel Crespo), a secondary school, was long the only secondary school to serve Chitré and Villa de Los Santos. It is among the best public secondary schools in the country. The Padre Segundo Familiar Cano School (Colegio Padre Segundo Familiar Cano), called Monagrillo Secondary School (Colegio Secundario de Monagrillo) since 2007, is also located in Chitré. It was founded in 1970 and is now has a national reputation as an excellent school.

There are also many private schools in Chitré, including the Colegio Agustiniano, a Roman Catholic private school and Soyuz Bilingual School.

The University of Panama has a site in Chitré, as do the Latin University of Panama and Columbus University.

== Climate ==
Climate data for Chitré (La Villa de Los Santos) (2001–2015 normals, extremes 1964–present)
Month	Jan	Feb	Mar	Apr	May	Jun	Jul	Aug	Sep	Oct	Nov	Dec	Year
Record high °C (°F)	35.5 (95.9)	36.6 (97.9)	36.2 (97.2)	37.8 (100.0)	38.3 (100.9)	37.2 (99.0)	36.2 (97.2)	36.2 (97.2)	36.0 (96.8)	36.0 (96.8)	36.0 (96.8)	35.4 (95.7)	38.3 (100.9)
Mean daily maximum °C (°F)	32.6 (90.7)	33.1 (91.6)	33.6 (92.5)	34.2 (93.6)	33.5 (92.3)	32.2 (90.0)	32.0 (89.6)	32.1 (89.8)	32.1 (89.8)	31.6 (88.9)	31.5 (88.7)	32.1 (89.8)	32.6 (90.6)
Daily mean °C (°F)	28.2 (82.8)	28.5 (83.3)	29.0 (84.2)	29.7 (85.5)	29.1 (84.4)	28.2 (82.8)	28.0 (82.4)	27.9 (82.2)	27.9 (82.2)	27.5 (81.5)	27.5 (81.5)	27.8 (82.0)	28.3 (82.9)
Mean daily minimum °C (°F)	23.8 (74.8)	23.9 (75.0)	24.4 (75.9)	25.1 (77.2)	24.7 (76.5)	24.2 (75.6)	24.0 (75.2)	23.8 (74.8)	23.6 (74.5)	23.4 (74.1)	23.4 (74.1)	23.4 (74.1)	24.0 (75.2)
Record low °C (°F)	17.0 (62.6)	17.5 (63.5)	16.7 (62.1)	17.5 (63.5)	17.8 (64.0)	17.2 (63.0)	17.8 (64.0)	17.8 (64.0)	18.3 (64.9)	17.8 (64.0)	16.7 (62.1)	14.4 (57.9)	14.4 (57.9)
Average rainfall mm (inches)	10.2 (0.40)	0.6 (0.02)	3.5 (0.14)	22.1 (0.87)	115.7 (4.56)	137.6 (5.42)	96.6 (3.80)	125.0 (4.92)	160.8 (6.33)	223.2 (8.79)	126.9 (5.00)	44.2 (1.74)	1,066.4 (41.99)
Mean monthly sunshine hours	255.0	244.9	268.7	229.0	162.9	120.7	128.5	131.3	124.1	136.8	154.2	202.5	2,158.6
Percentage possible sunshine	70	73	72	62	42	32	33	34	34	37	44	56	49
Source 1: IMHPA
Source 2: INEC

== Notable people from Chitré ==
- Enrique Geenzier, poet, politician, and diplomat
- Annabel Miguelena, writer, lawyer, actress
- Félix Danilo Gómez (Flex), musician
- Juan Ramón Solís, football player
- Javier Saavedra, musician in Los Rabanes
- Sheldry Sáez, Miss Panama Universe 2011 and top 10 in Miss Universe 2011
- Olmedo Sáenz, former Major League Baseball player
