= Civil Aviation Authority (Panama) =

The Civil Aviation Authority (Spanish: Autoridad Aeronáutica Civil) is the civil aviation authority of Panama. Its headquarters are in Building 805 of the former Albrook Air Force Station. Decree No. 147 of August 23, 1932 established the agency. Since July 2014, its director general has been Alfredo Fonseca Mora.

The Junta de Investigación de Accidentes investigates aviation accidents and incidents.
