= Dubwala =

Tubualá Dubwala
- Location within Panama
- Coordinates: 8°55′15″N 77°43′25″W
- Country: Panama
- Province: Kuna Yala

Population (2008)
  - Total: 1,183

Tubualá or Dubwala is an island town in the Guna Yala province of Panama. It is less than 1 kilometre (0.6 mi) off the mainland shore.

Tubualá is served by Tubualá Airport.

== Sources ==
- OpenStreetMap - Tubualá
- Google Maps - Tubualá
