= Contadora Island =

Island in the Gulf of Panama

Coordinates: 8°38′N 79°02′W

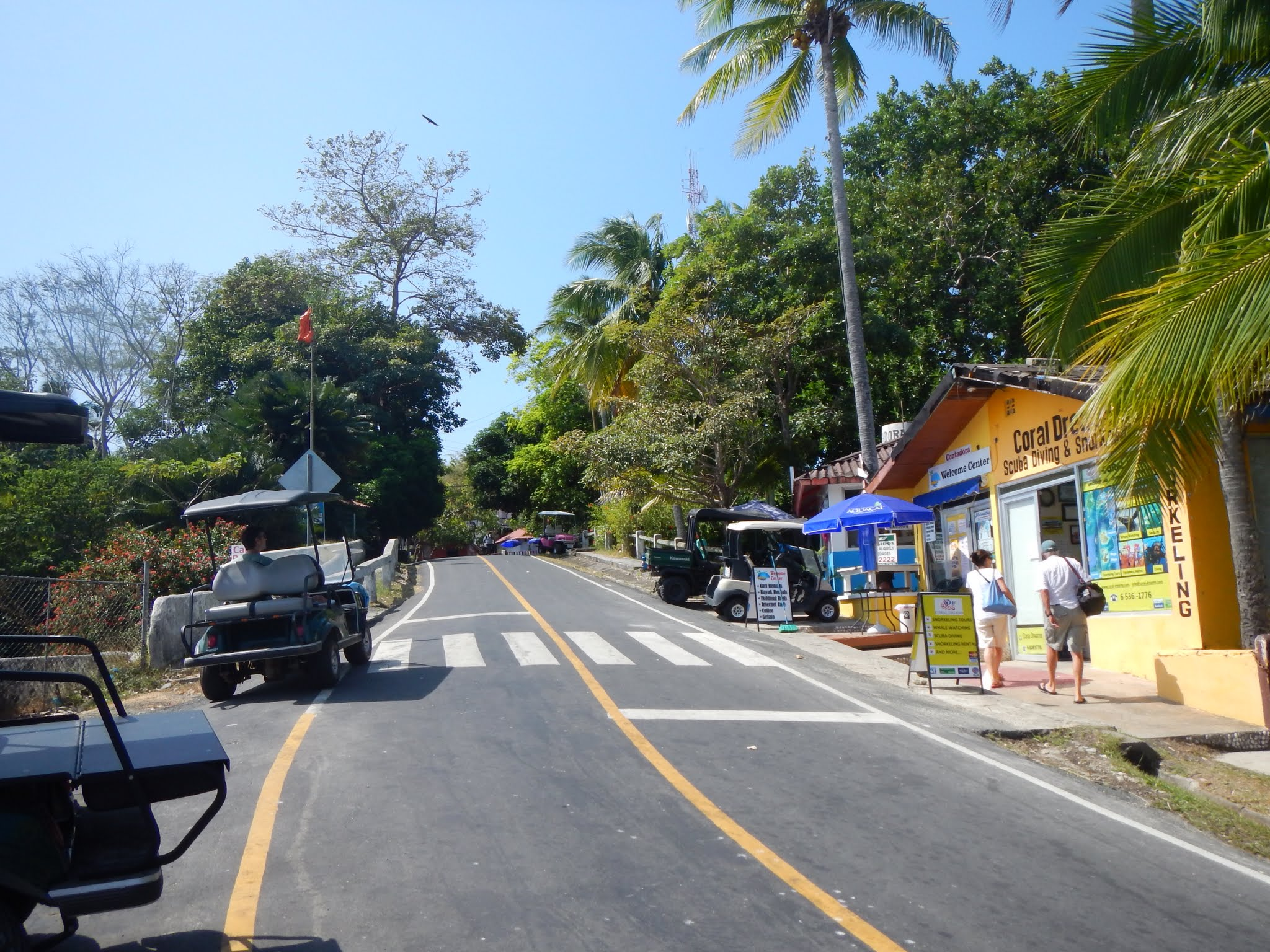

- Location within Panama Location within Panamá Province

Geography
- Location: Gulf of Panama
- Archipelago: Pearl Islands
- Area: 1.39 km^{2} (0.54 sq mi)

Administration
- Panama
- Province: Panama

Demographics
- Population: 253 (2000)

Isla Contadora (or Contadora Island in English) is a Panamanian island on the Pearl Islands archipelago (Spanish: Archipielago de las Perlas) in the Gulf of Panama. It has an area of 1.39 km^{2}, which makes it the 11th largest island of the archipelago. With a population of 253 (census 2000), however, it ranks third, after Isla del Rey and Isla Taboga. A popular tourist destination, Contadora has a small regional/domestic airport (IATA code: OTD), and has regular flights to and from Panama City and the rest of the islands in the archipelago.

== History ==
Contadora was the island where the Spanish counted the pearls that were harvested from the other islands in the archipelago, hence the name of the island, which means "the one that counts" in Spanish. The islands produced pearls of many colors and sizes, and during the many years when pearls were harvested from the waters around the islands, the natives would converge to Contadora to count their pearls and sell them to the Spaniards. Early last century there was an underwater epidemic which killed most of the pearl oysters, reducing the production of pearls to a dribble.

In 1979, the exiled Iranian shah, Mohammad Reza Pahlavi, briefly lived in Contadora.

The Contadora Peace Accords, which laid the foundation for peace in Central America, were negotiated in this island during the 1980s. Hence the Contadora Group took their name from the island's name.

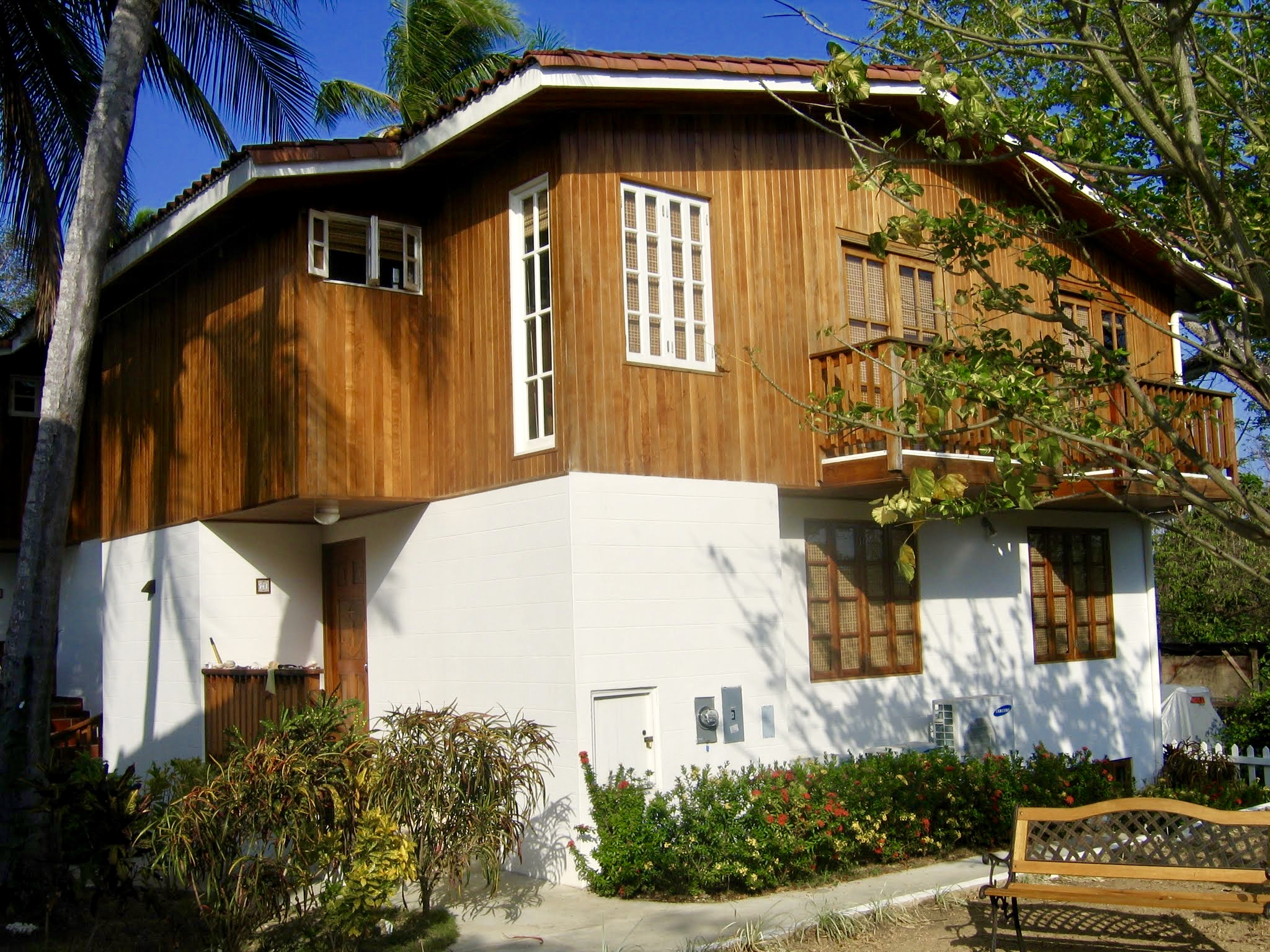
Villa in Playa Galeón

== Tourism ==
Contadora is a growing tourist destination known for its remote location and secluded beaches. There are two main hotels on the island, Villa Romanica and Perla Real (A large hotel named The Point still exists on the North Side of the island but this has since closed for business). However, most tourists tend to stay at the villas for rent at the northeast side of the island due to their privacy and access to a private beach. There are also several local restaurants that cater to all types of food. The main boulevard on the northeast side of the island, next to the small stretch of runway for the incoming airplane, lay several tourist shops that offer local jewelry and souvenirs as well as a visitor center that rents golf carts to explore the island.

It is possible to book a day pass to Contadora Island on Playa Larga or Playa Cacique. Those who prefer to explore the island can do so on foot, bicycle, golf cart, scooter, ATV or by taxi. It is also possible to go snorkeling on this island that has plenty of rock and coral formations which are home to all kinds of fish. Snorkeling tours can take you to visit other islands nearby. There is also a dive center on Contadora Island for those who want to get certified by PADI. Divers can go on a dive to sites which are about 15 minutes away from the island. The Pearl Islands is also a world renowned fishing destination. It is possible to catch sailfish, wahoo, blue marlin, tuba, dolphinfish (often called dorado or mahi mahi), grouper, amberjack, rooster fish and more. Whales come to the Pearl Islands from June through October. Whale watching tours start from Panama City or Contadora Island.

The island has also hosted three showings of the TV show Survivor and many of the crew members and directors stayed on the island during filming.

== Geography ==
Contadora houses several beaches, including Playa Larga, Playa Galeón, Playa Canoa, Playa Caracol, Playa Lucas, Playa Roca, Playa Camarón, Playa Cacique, and Playa de las Suecas. All of the beaches house white sands and turquoise waters reminiscent of the Caribbean. Ample coral reefs litter the ocean and sea life such as clown fish, angel fish, butterfly fish, red snapper, mahi-mahi, parrot fish, stingrays, and nurse sharks. The island is devoid of mountains, though small hills make for relatively steep roads on the northeast side of the island. Due to that, tourists often choose to travel around the island via motorcycle, golf cart, or scooter. Contadora's main water source comes from a small lake at the northwest of the island called el Largo. Rainforest makes up most of the islands mass, and within everything from iguanas, to geckos, to monkeys, to snakes, to non-indigenous deer live.

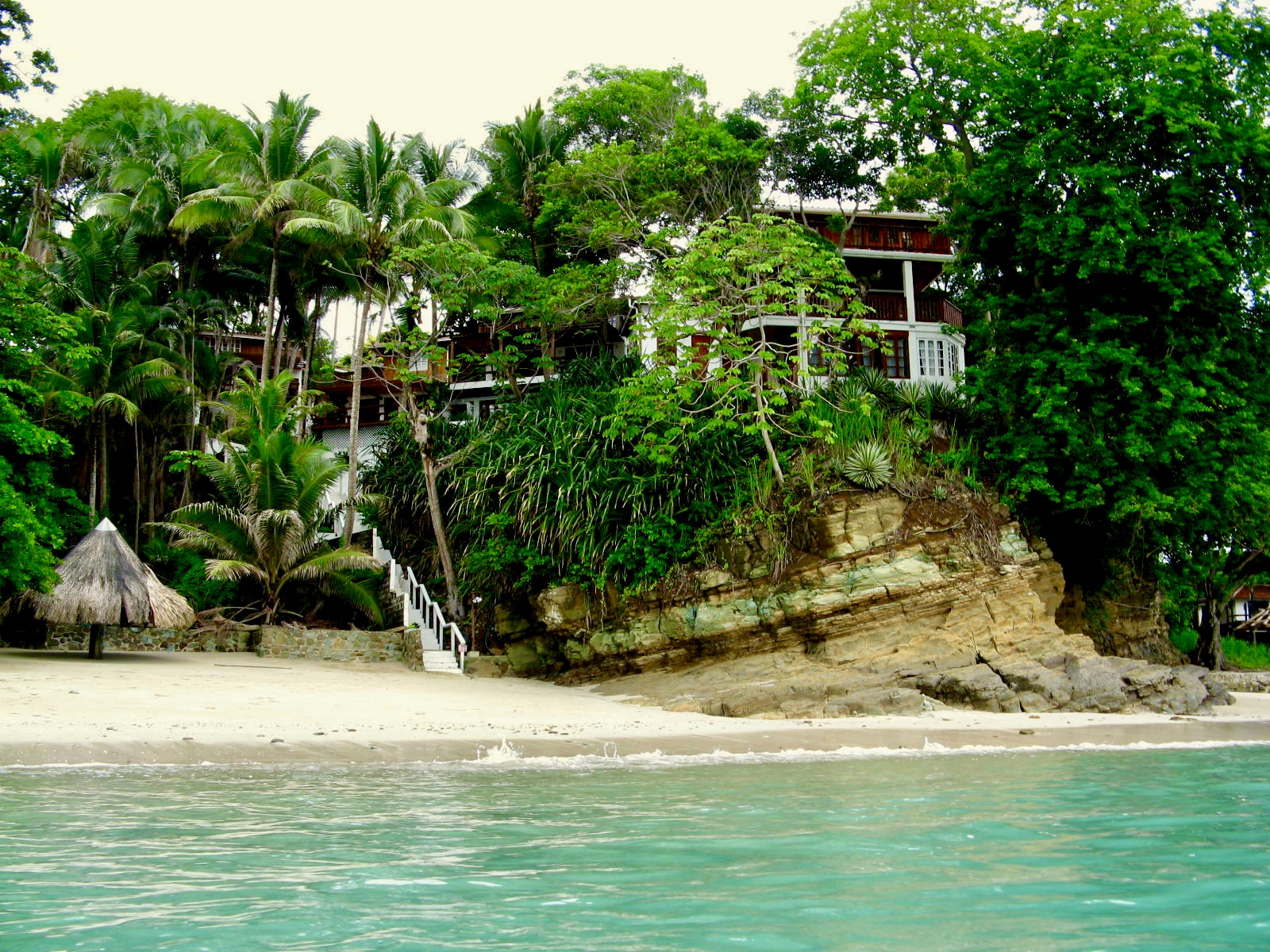
Playa Galeón

== Population ==
The population of Contadora is a mere 115 people. While most of the citizens there are native Panamanians, some are multimillionaires with summer homes. When Shah Mohammed Reza Pahlavi was exiled from Iran he spent much of his fortune on property in Contadora. Some of the homes are now rented out to tourists. A small school is present on the island, where several children attend; however, most of the island life is centered around tourism, so most of the locals spend their time catering to such industries.
