= Pedasí, Los Santos =

Pedasí
- Corregimiento
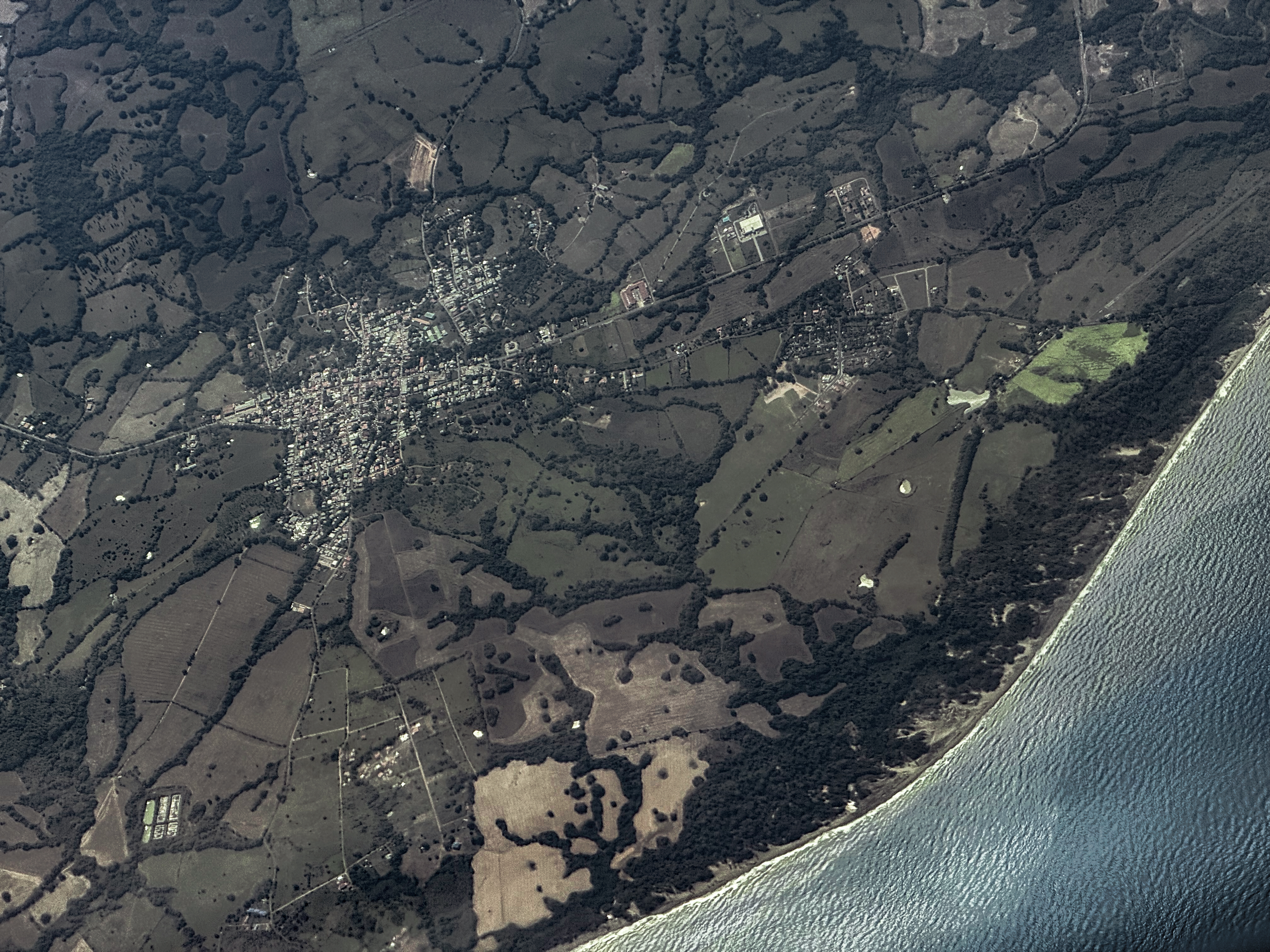
- Aerial image of Pedasí

- Location within Panama
- Coordinates: 7°32′N 80°2′W
- Country: Panama
- Province: Los Santos
- District: Pedasí
- Established: 1840

Area
  - Land: 378.1 km^{2} (146.0 sq mi)

Population (1 July 2020)
  - Total: 4,696
  - Density: 12.4/km^{2} (32/sq mi)
- Population density calculated based on land area
- Time zone: UTC−5 (EST)
- Climate: Aw

Pedasí (Spanish pronunciation: [peðaˈsi]) is a town and corregimiento situated on the south-eastern tip of the Azuero Peninsula on Panama’s Pacific coast. It is the capital of Pedasí District in Los Santos Province. Its population as of 1990 was 1,494; its population as of 2000 was 1,830. It had a population of 2,410 as of 2010. As of 1 July 2020 the population had grown to 4,696.

Population of Pedasi over time
Year	Total Population
1990	1494
2000	1830
2010	2410
2020	4696

Population of Pedasi over time

It is principally a fishing village.

Pedasí's town has two banks, a handful of restaurants, mini - supermarkets and small shops. The town is equipped with telephone and Internet service. Pedasí is known for lively annual carnivals, pristine beaches, and activities such as sport fishing, diving and surfing, as well as its proximity to several of Panama's national parks and preserves.

Pedasí town consists mainly of a central road (Avenida Central), a plaza (city center). About two blocks away are several nicely maintained civic buildings, surrounded by quiet, residential blocks.

With its quaint architecture and neatly laid-out streets, Pedasí is one of the main attractions of the Los Santos region.

== Geography ==
Pedasi is located at the South Eastern tip of the Azuero Peninsula on Panama's Pacific coast.

== Transportation ==
By car from Panama City, Pedasí is about a five-hour drive.

Pedasí is served by the Capt. J. Montenegro Airport (IATA: PDM), via charter or private flights.

Bus and private shuttle services to Pedasi are also available daily.

== Government ==
Former Panamanian President Mireya Moscoso Rodríguez de Arias, Panama's first female president, is a Pedasí native. She made it an objective during her term to better the town in which she was born, giving Pedasí improved infrastructure. There is a bust and plaque in the main plaza in her honor.

== Attractions ==
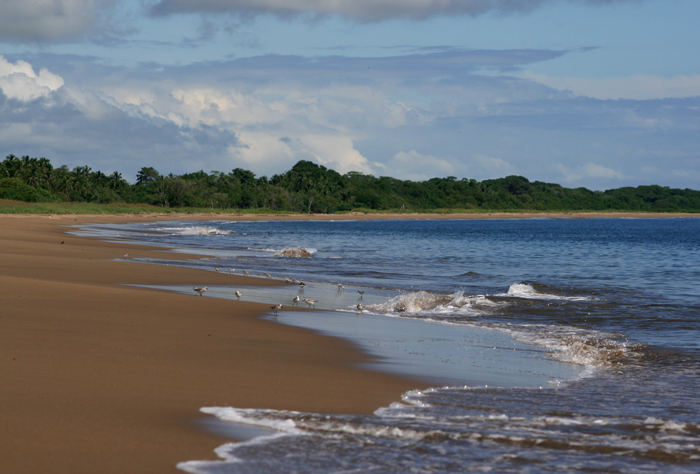
A view of sandpipers patrolling the surf along Playa El Arenal in the early morning hours.

Pedasí town is a little more than three kilometers from the coast, where there are several sandy beaches.

=== Nearby beaches ===
- El Arenal (Bajadero)
- Playa El Toro
- Playa La Garita
- Playa El Lagarto
- Playa El Lanchón
- Playa El Cascajal
- Playa Los Destiladeros
- Puerto Escondido
- Playa Los Panamaes
- Playa la Miel
- Punta Chumico
- Playa Venao

=== Surfing ===
There are several breaks on Pedasí's beaches, the most famous local surfer's attraction is Playa Venao at 20 miles (32 km) from the town. In 2011 and 2012 Playa Venao hosted two World Surfing Championships ISA and boosted a world recognition of the entire area as a top notch Surfing spot, the locals claim there are always waves breaking and closing out in the beautiful bay of Playa Venao. Other more moderate breaks exist, which range from small for beginners, to overhead with the right swell. Playa El Toro has a left and right rock bottom point break for surfing (only one or two times per year with big swell), and Playa El Lagarto has left and right beach breaks (30 yards length for the better). Playa Los Destiladeros also has several breaks for surfing. Kitesurfing is possible during the dry season, January to April, particularly at Playa Arenal.

=== Sport fishing ===
Pelagic game fish are abundant because the continental shelf drops sharply relatively close to shore, with year-round catch including amberjack, Pacific sailfish (Istiophorus platypterus), cubera snapper (Lutjanus cyanopterus), roosterfish (Nematistius pectoralis) and grouper, while dorado (Coryphaena hippurus, commonly called mahi-mahi, or dolphinfish), both bigeye tuna (Thunnus obesus) and yellowfin tuna (Thunnus albacares), and wahoo (Acanthocybium solandri) are found seasonally, November through April.

=== Isla Iguana ===
Isla Iguana is an island wildlife refuge that can be reached with a 20-minute boat ride from Playa El Arenal. The 52-hectare island is surrounded by an extensive coral reef, which gives it two powdery-soft white sand beaches: Playa El Cirial (252 metres (827 ft) long) and Playita del Faro (37 metres (121 ft) long).

The refuge is home to more than 62 bird species, and a major nesting site for the magnificent frigatebird (Fregata magnificens), with a population of more than 5000. The island also houses several reptile species, including the black iguana (Ctenosaura similis) for which the island is named.

The refuge also comprises a 40-hectare marine area, also migrating humpback whales (Megaptera novaeangliae) between June and October—and one of the largest well-preserved coral reefs in Panama. The reef is home to a variety of fish, rays, eels, and sea turtles.

== Architecture ==
The area's local architecture is a combination of Colonial Spanish style and modern day masonry block.

== Culture ==
This town plaza is the location where people come to socialize at night. Some men can often be seen wearing cutarras (traditional sandals) and the region's folkloric black and white hats; women, during festivals and carnivals, don polleras, traditional hand-stitched multi-layered dresses, some of which can take nearly a year to complete. During local fiestas the women will further adorn their polleras with ornate jewelry and gold chains.

=== Carnival ===
Carnival is the annual high point of local life in Pedasí, which is renowned for the most exuberant celebration after Las Tablas. The town divides itself into two factions, Calle Abajo (lower street) and Calle Arriba (upper street), with their respective queens, each trying to outdo the other with floats, music and fireworks. At the end of the celebration, the winning queen is chosen by popular vote.

Pedasí also celebrates the fiesta of Santa Catalina (St Catherine's Day) on November 25 (see also: Calendar of saints).
