= Transport in Panama =

Transport in Panama covers a vast network of routes predominantly traversed by cargo trucks and buses. The country's railway system, known as the Panama Canal Railway, facilitates the transportation of both passengers and goods. With a total of 15,137 km of roads, its four expressways—Corredor Sur, Corredor Norte, Autopista La Chorrera, and Colón Panama—are the arteries that link various parts of the country. Tocumen International Airport (PTY) is the key hub for international travel, ranking among the largest and most important airports in Latin America. Additionally, the renowned Panama Canal links the mere 60 km that separate the Pacific Ocean and Atlantic Ocean, offering an alternative route for maritime cargo transportation, avoiding the need to sail around South America.

Buses, the metro, taxis, and private car rental companies compose the urban transportation system. The introduction of the Metrobus has gradually replaced the colorful Diablos Rojos buses, which once transported passengers around the city and its surrounding areas. Long-distance buses connect different regions within the country, departing from the Albrook Bus Terminal, next to the Albrook Mall. Nearly all major cities in Panama are interconnected via a network of bus terminals, with interstate and international routes extending into Central America, including Mexico. The Panama Metro covers a significant portion of Panama City and is operated by Metro de Panamá S.A. This environmentally friendly railway system operates on electricity and inaugurated its first line in 2014. Despite the weather conditions, the transportation infrastructure in Panama facilitates both domestic and international travel.

== Rail transport ==
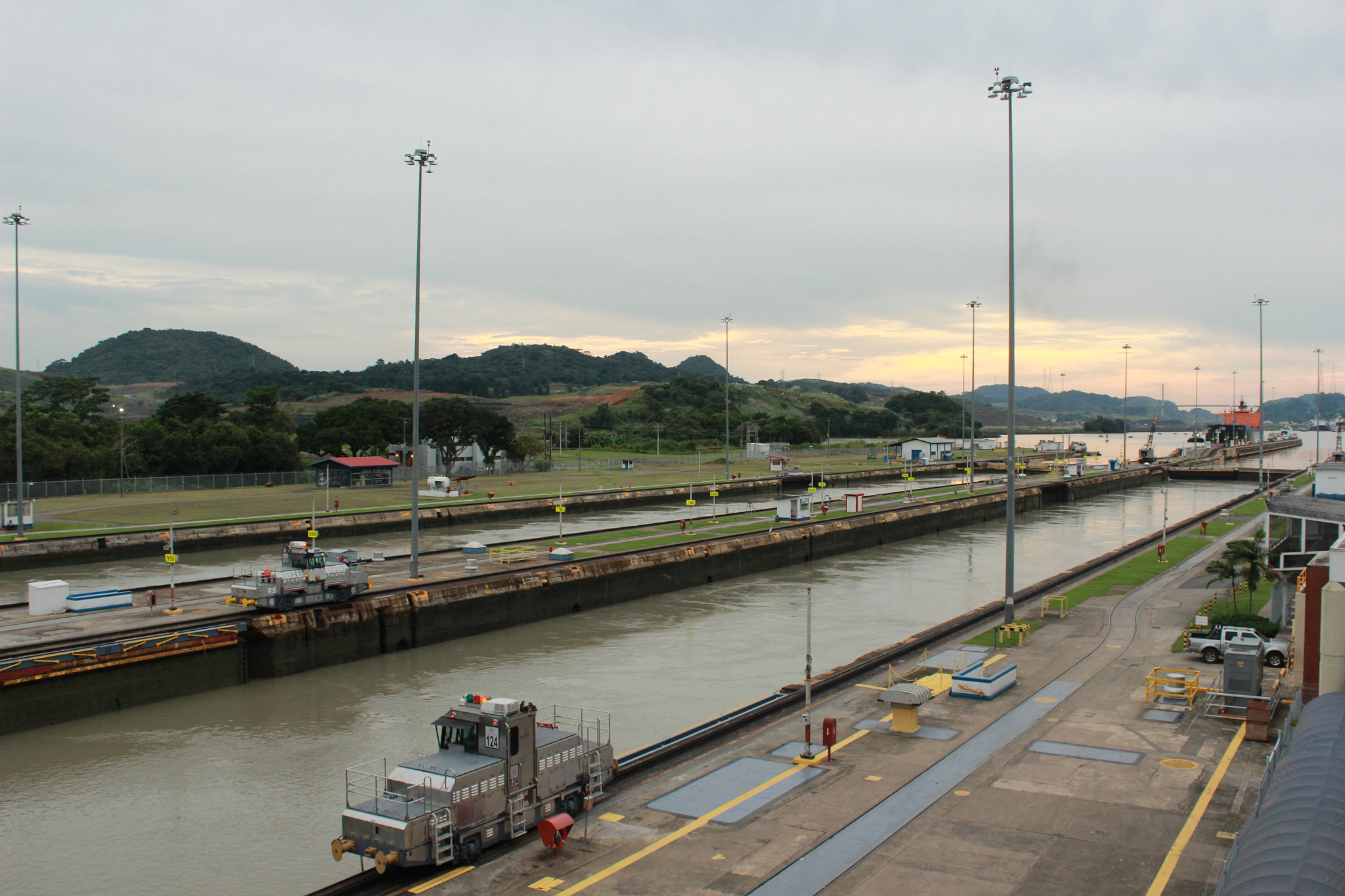
Mules on the ship handling tracks along with the locks of the Panama Canal

The Panama Canal Railway is the only passenger and freight railway in the country. It is a standard-gauge railway running for 76 km between Colón on the Atlantic coast and Corozal (just outside the capital, Panama City) on the Pacific coast. These are the only two stations on the line. Additionally, a broad-gauge railway (1524mm) exists alongside the locks of the Panama Canal. It is used by electric locomotives ("Mules") that assist in ship handling.

The Panama Metro is a rapid transit system in Panama City. Two lines are currently operational (opened in 2014 and 2019), with further lines planned.

== Road transport ==
- Total: 15,137 km
  - paved: 6,351 km (including 149 km of expressways)
  - unpaved: 8,785 km (2010)

Panama has well-developed highways in particular, there are four main expressways:

- Corredor Sur: Panama City to the Tocumen International Airport, 26 km (toll road).
- Corredor Norte: Panama City to Tocumen, 30 km (toll road).
- Autopista La Chorrera: Panama City to La Chorrera, 44 km (formerly a toll road, but free from tolls since 2009).
- Colón Expressway: Panama City to Colón, 59 km (toll road).

Because of recent upgrades, the Pan-American highway has four lanes that run from Panama City to Santiago de Veraguas. Also, a small section of the Pan-American highway from Tocumen to Pacora, counting for 18 km has been upgraded to a freeway. The same is true for the Pan-American stretch between David and Capacho, on the border with Costa Rica, adding 55 km of freeway. The newly built freeway between David and Bajo Boquete, extends for 38 km. This also applies to the Chitré - Las Tablas freeway that extends for 30 km.

Panama's roads, traffic, and transportation systems are generally safe, however, non-functioning traffic lights are common. Driving is often hazardous and demanding due to dense traffic, undisciplined driving habits, poorly maintained streets, and a lack of effective signs and traffic signals. On roads where poor lighting and driving conditions prevail, night driving is difficult. Night driving is particularly hazardous on the old Panama City – Colon highway.

Buses and taxis are not always maintained in a safe operating condition due to lack of regulatory enforcement, and since 2007 auto insurance has been mandatory in Panama. Traffic in Panama moves on the right, and Panamanian law requires that drivers and passengers wear seat belts, but airbags are not mandatory.

Flooding during the April to December rainy season occasionally makes city streets unusable for most vehicles, and washes out some roads in rural areas. In addition, rural areas are often poorly maintained and lack illumination at night. Such roads are generally less traveled and the availability of emergency roadside assistance is very limited. Road travel is more dangerous during the rainy season and from the time of Carnival through to Good Friday. Carnival starts the Saturday before Ash Wednesday and goes on for four days.

== Water transport ==
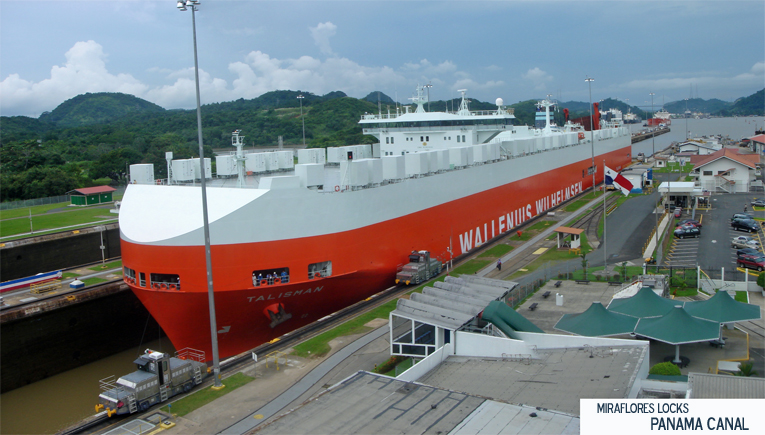
Mules maneuvering a ship through the Miraflores locks in the Panama Canal.

There are 800 km of waterways navigable by shallow draft vessels. The Panama Canal runs for 82 km across the country and is an important route for international freight ships traveling between the Atlantic and Pacific oceans.

=== Pipelines ===
The Trans-Panama pipeline carries crude oil for 130 km.

=== Ports and harbors ===
==== Atlantic ====
- Manzanillo
- Coco Solo

==== Pacific ====
- Balboa
- Charco Azul
- PSA Panama International Terminal
- Multipurpose Dock of Puerto Armuelles

=== Merchant marine ===
Panama maintains the world's largest merchant marine fleet by number of vessels and total tonnage, a position it has held for much of the 21st century. As of 2024, the Panama Ship Registry, administered by the Panama Maritime Authority (AMP), comprises approximately 8,600 vessels, accounting for roughly 15% to 18% of the global merchant fleet. This dominance is primarily attributed to its "open registry" system, commonly referred to as a flag of convenience, which was pioneered by Panama in 1917. The system allows shipowners of any nationality to register their vessels under the Panamanian flag to benefit from lower registration fees, a favorable tax environment—including total exemption from income tax on international maritime earnings—and flexible labor regulations that do not require the hiring of Panamanian crews.

As of 2019, the ship types were: Bulk carrier (2,567), container ship (609), general cargo (1,325), oil tanker (798), and others (2,561).

The operational framework of Panama's merchant marine is supported by a 24/7 global network of 64 consulates and nine regional technical offices, which facilitate expedited registration processes often completed within 24 to 48 hours. Beyond simple registration, Panama offers specialized maritime services, including dual registration for bareboat charters and a "preliminary registration" of ship mortgages that is widely recognized by international financial institutions for its legal stability. While the registry generates significant revenue for the Panamanian state—contributing over $70 million annually to the national budget—the sheer volume of ships has presented challenges for regulatory oversight. In response, the AMP has implemented the Fleet Risk Assessment and Performance Monitoring Accelerated Program (FRA & PMAP) in 2025 to enhance safety and environmental compliance among its flagged vessels and ensure they remain on the "White List" of international maritime organizations.

== Air transport ==
Tocumen International Airport is the primary international airport, located just east of Panama City. It is the hub of flag carrier Copa Airlines. Scheduled services operate to destinations in the Americas, Europe, Asia and the Middle East.

There are 117 airports across the country, 57 with paved runways and 60 with unpaved runways.

== See also ==
- Panama
- Panama Railway
- Rail transport by country
