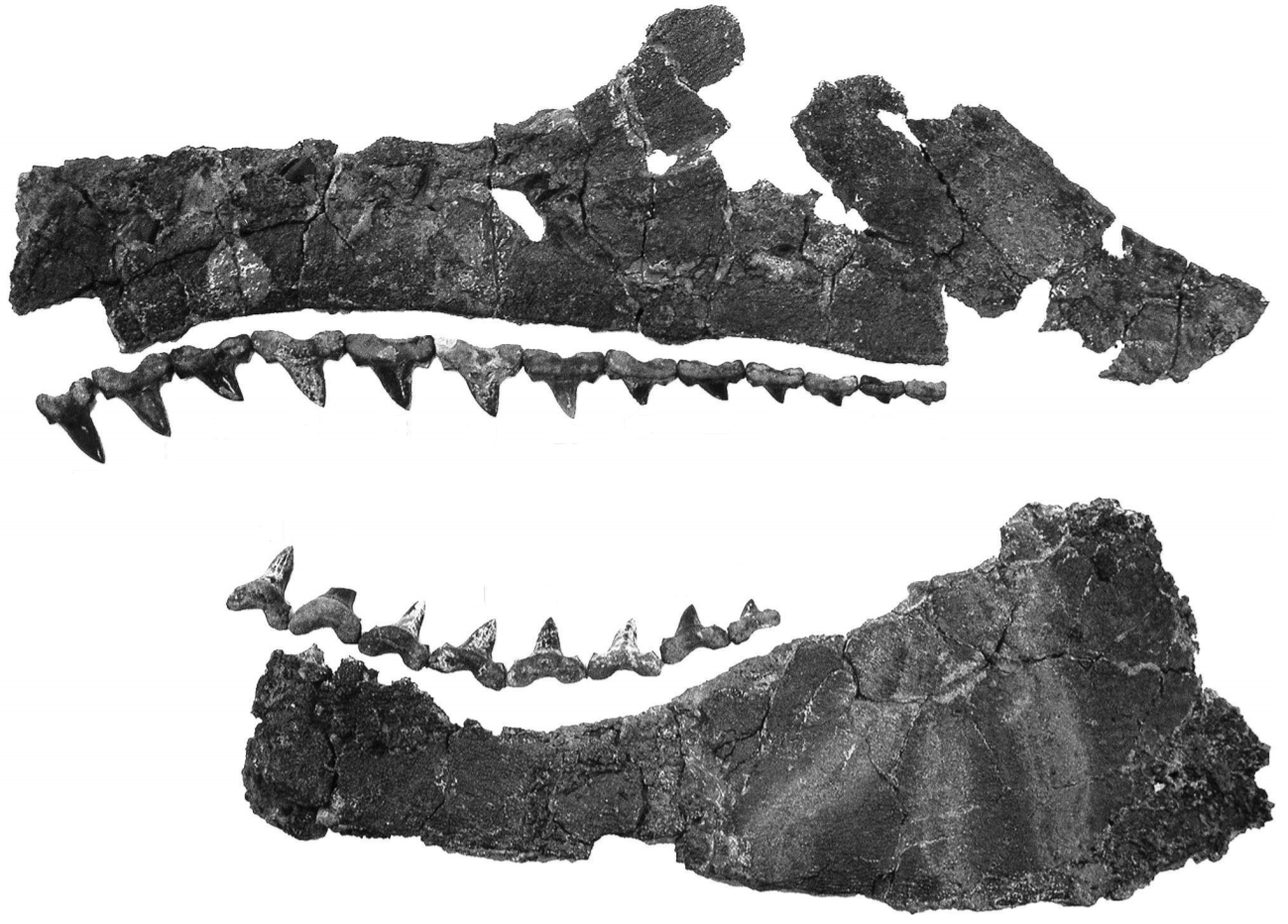
- Jaws and teeth of the C. hattini holotype (LACM 128126) from the Niobrara Formation of Kansas
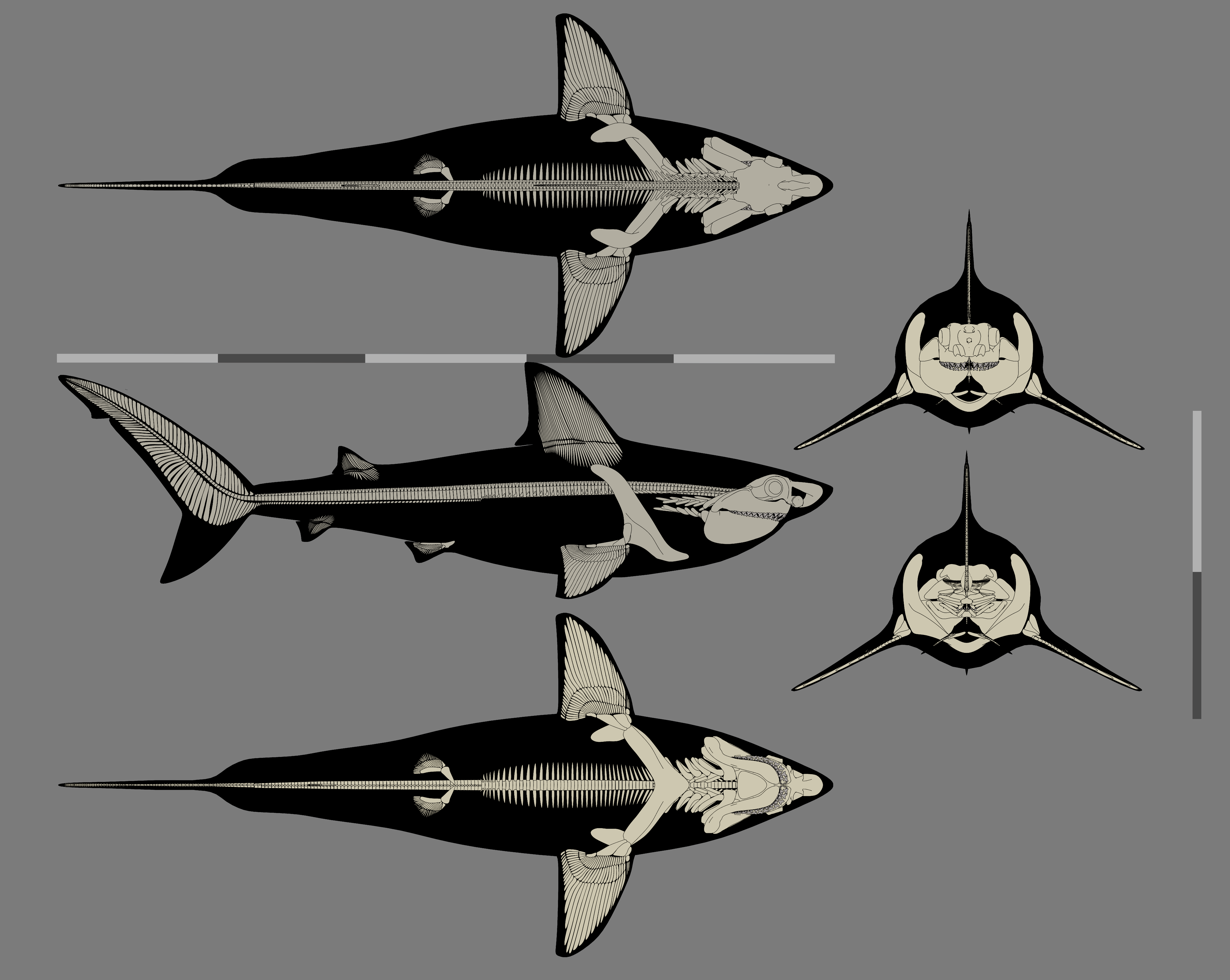
- Speculative skeletal reconstruction

Scientific classification
- Kingdom: Animalia
- Phylum: Chordata
- Class: Chondrichthyes
- Subclass: Elasmobranchii
- Division: Selachii
- Order: Lamniformes
- Family: †Otodontidae
- Genus: †Cretalamna; Glükman, 1958

Type species
- †Lamna appendiculata Agassiz, 1835

Species
- List of species: †C. appendiculata (Agassiz, 1835); †C. lata (Agassiz, 1843); †C. borealis Priem, 1897; †C. biauriculata Wanner, 1902; †C. maroccana Arambourg, 1935; †C. nigeriana Cappetta, 1972; †C. arambourgi Cappetta & Case, 1975; †C. catoxodon Siversson et al., 2015; †C. deschutteri Siversson et al., 2015; †C. ewelli Siversson et al., 2015; †C. gertericorum Siversson et al., 2015; †C. hattini Siversson et al., 2015; †C. sarcoportheta Siversson et al., 2015; †C. bryanti Ebersole and Ehret, 2018; †C. aschersoni? Stromer, 1905; †C. crassa? Agassiz, 1843

Synonyms
- List of synonyms: Squalus mustelus Mantell, 1822; Squalus cornubicus Geinitz, 1839; Odontaspis raphiodon Geinitz, 1839; Lamna appendiculata Agassiz, 1835; Lamna crassa Agassiz, 1843; Otodus appendiculatus Agassiz, 1843; Otodus latus Agassiz, 1843; Otodus crassus Agassiz, 1843; Otodus basalis Stoliczka, 1873; Lamna (Otodus) appendiculata Zittel, 1895; Lamna borealis Priem, 1897; Lamna (Otodus) appendicularis Toula, 1900; Odontaspis gigas Dalinkevicus, 1935; Lamna lata Gyen, 1937; Plicatolamna arcuata Edwards, 1976; Cretolamna appendiculata var. pachyrhiza Herman, 1977; Cretolamna appendiculata pachyrhiza Lauginiger and Hartstein, 1983; Cretoxyrhina cf. mantelli Kemp, 1991; Cretolamna pachyrhyza Herman and Van Waes, 2012

= Cretalamna =

Cretalamna Temporal range: Late Albian-Lutetian, ~115–46.25 Ma (Note: Cappetta (2012) reported 'C'. aschersoni from the Priabonian of Egypt.)

Extinct genus of sharks

Cretalamna is a genus of extinct otodontid shark that lived from the latest Early Cretaceous to Eocene epoch (about 115 to 46 million years ago). It is considered by many to be the ancestor of the largest sharks to have ever lived, such as Otodus angustidens, Otodus chubutensis, and Otodus megalodon.

== Taxonomy ==
=== Research history ===
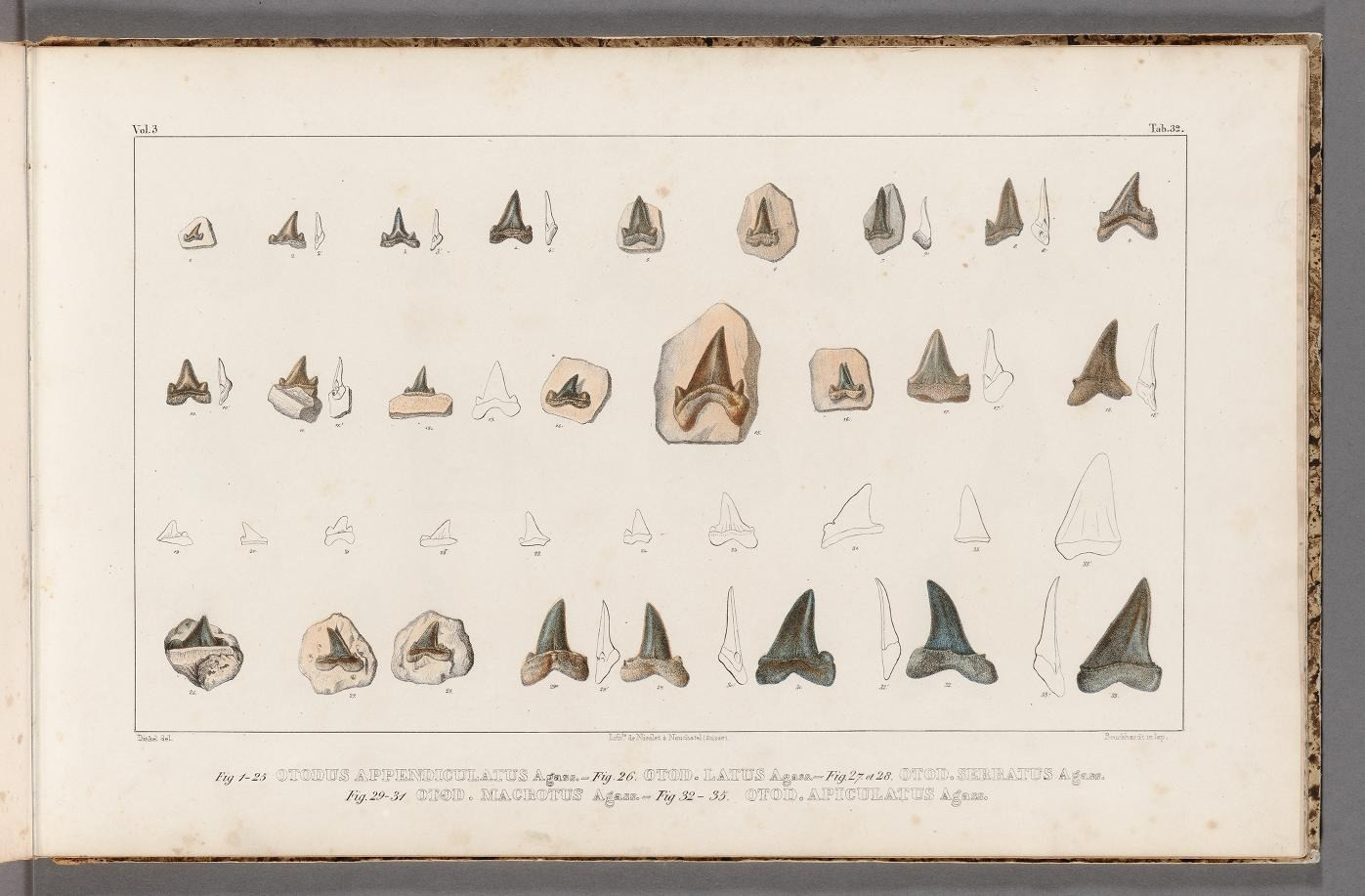
Original syntypes of Otodus appendiculatus (Fig. 1-25) and holotype of C. lata (Fig. 26) in the third volume of Recherches sur les poissons fossiles; the tooth in Fig. 10 is the sole lectotype of C. appendiculata

Cretalamna was first described by Swiss naturalist Louis Agassiz using five teeth previously identified as the common smooth-hound and collected by English paleontologist Gideon Mantell from the Southerham Grey Pit near Lewes, East Sussex. In his 1835 publication Rapport sur les poissons fossiles découverts en Angleterre, he reidentified them as a new species of porbeagle shark under the taxon Lamna appendiculata. In 1843, Agassiz published Recherches sur les poissons fossiles, which reexamined Mantell's five teeth. Using them, eight additional teeth collected by Mantell, and twenty more teeth collected by various paleontologists in various locations (One tooth found by the 3rd Earl of Enniskillen from the Speeton Clay in Yorkshire; one tooth of the collection of a Strasbourg Museum from an unspecified location; one tooth of the collection of the Hancock Museum from the Marly Chalk near Cambridge; and six teeth of the collection of German paleontologist Heinrich Georg Bronn from chalk around Aachen), he described a species whose teeth had thick bulged roots, lateral cusplets, and extreme variability. Agassiz remarked that some of the examined teeth may be variable enough to belong to a separate species, but ultimately unified them under a new taxon Otodus appendiculatus. The species would later be found in 1958 by Soviet paleontologist Leonid Glickman to belong to a distinct new genus- Cretalamna.

Despite Agassiz's remarks on variability, his ultimately broad interpretation of O. appendiculatus subsequently led the species to become a wastebasket taxon culminating to an interpretation of C. appendiculata as a variable cosmopolitan species with a 50 million year range. This changed when paleontologist Mikael Siversson found that the twenty-five syntypes actually represented a mix of at least six or more different species including three additional genera Dwardius, Cretoxyrhina, and Cretodus. To remedy the taxonomic issue, he redesignated one of the syntypes as the sole lectotype of C. appendiculata in 1999. In 2015, he led a study which revisited the taxonomic situation and established a renewed description of the species, which led to the erection of six additional Cretalamna species- C. catoxodon, C. deschutteri, C. ewelli, C. gertericorum, C. hattini, and C. sarcoporthea.

Before Siversson, other Cretalamna species have been described. Another species described by Agassiz under the taxon Otodus latus was demoted to a variation of C. appendiculata in 1908, promoted into a subspecies in 1977 by Belgian paleontologist Jaques Herman, and finally elevated to the species level as Cretolamna lata by Herman and paleontologist Van Waes Hilde in 2012. In 1897, French paleontologist Fernand Priem described a single tooth from the Köpinge Sandstone in Scania, Sweden under the taxon Lamna borealis. This would be revised to 'Cretolamna borealis' by Glickman in a 1980 paper. In 1902, German paleontologist Johannes Wanner described teeth from Egyptian Cretaceous deposits near the Dakhla Oasis and Farafra. He noted that the teeth are almost identical with that of the Otodus appendiculatus teeth, except that the Egyptian teeth also contained two clear pairs of lateral cusplets (a feature not seen in Otodus appendiculatus). Wanner concluded that the teeth were of a closely related new species and placed it under the taxon Otodus biauriculatus. In 1935, French Paleontologist Camille Arambourg described a new subspecies of C. biauriculata from teeth found in Moroccan phosphates under the taxon Lamna biauriculata maroccana, which was elevated into its own species in 1997. In 1972, French ichthyologist Henri Cappetta described teeth from Maastrichtian deposits near the Mentès well in Tahoua, Niger, which he assigned to the subspecies Lamna biauriculata nigeriana. This subspecies would also be elevated to its own species in 1991. In 1975, Cappetta and American paleontologist Gerard Case examined Cretalamna teeth described by Arambourg in 1952 from Danian deposits in Morocco and proposed that it represents a new subspecies of the type species and assigned it the taxon Cretolamna appendiculata arambourgi, which Siversson et al. (2015) elevated into its own species. In 2018, American paleontologists Jun Ebersole and Dana Ehret described a new species of Cretalamna from various teeth from the Eutaw Formation and Mooreville Chalk in Alabama, which they named C. bryanti.

=== Etymology ===
The genus Cretalamna is a portmanteau of creta, the Latin word for "chalk", prefixed to the genus Lamna, which is a romanization of the Ancient Greek λάμνα (lámna, meaning "kind of fierce shark"). When put together they mean "chalk-shark", which refers to chalk deposits from which the species' type specimens were found in. The type species name appendiculata is a feminine form of the Latin word appendiculātus (having an appendage), a reference to the thick bulged roots found in C. appendiculata teeth. The species name lata is derived from the feminine form of the Latin lātus (wide); a reference to the notably wide teeth of the species. The species name borealis is derived from the Latin boreālis (northern); this is a reference to its discovery from fossil deposits in Sweden, a boreal locality. The specific epithet of C. maroccana is a feminine form of the Latin word maroccānus (Moroccan), a reference to its type locality in Morocco. C. biauriculata's specific epithet is a portmanteau derived from the Latin prefix bi- (two) prefixed onto the Latin auriculātā (eared), together meaning "having two ears". This is a reference to the species' large lateral cusplets, which somewhat resemble a pair of ears. The species name nigeriana is derived from the country name Niger prefixed to the suffix -iana, a feminine variation of the Latin suffix -ānus (pertaining to), together meaning "pertaining to Niger". This is a reference to the species' type locality in Niger. The species name sarcoportheta is derived from the Ancient Greek σαρκός (sarkos, meaning "flesh") prefixed to the Ancient Greek πορθητής (porthitís, meaning "destroyer"), together meaning "destroyer of flesh". The species name catoxodon is derived from the Ancient Greek κατοξυς (katoxys, meaning "very sharp") prefixed to the Ancient Greek ὀδών (odon, meaning "tooth". Together they mean "very sharp tooth", referring to the unusually sharp cutting edges of some C. catoxodon teeth.

Six of the Cretalamna species have specific epithets that are named in honor of specific people, either for their contributions to the research of their associated species or for notable work they undertook. Of these six, five share a similar word structure that has a person's last name prefixed onto the Latin suffix -i (from). These species are C. arambourgi, which honors paleontologist Camille Arambourg for his discovery of the C. arambourgi type specimens and his contributions to North African paleontology; C. bryanti, which honors the Bryant family who helped enhance the reputation and missions of the University of Alabama, Alabama Museum of Natural History, and McWane Science Center through their commitment to education and support; C. deschutteri, which honors paleontologist Pieter De Scutter for his efforts to make Cretalamna teeth from a Bettrechies quarry available to Siversson et al. (2015) and for his work on Belgian Cenozoic sharks; C. ewelli, which honors paleontologist Keith Ewell who collected most of the C. ewelli type specimens in 2004; and C. hattini, which honors the late geologist Donald E. Hattin "for his work on the stratigraphy of the Niobrara Formation, western Kansas". The specific epithet of C. gertericorum is structured differently; it is derived from the names "Gert", "Eric", and the Latin suffix -orum (a masculine plural declension). The derived names "Gert" and "Eric" refer to fossil collectors Gert De Bie and Eric Collier, both of whom collected the majority of Cretalamna teeth examined in Siversson et al. (2015) that were from the Bettrechies quarry.

=== Spelling ===
The valid spelling of Cretalamna, specifically between it and 'Cretolamna', has been subject to controversy. Originally, Glickman described the genus with the intention of naming it as 'Cretolamna' , but during publication of the corresponding 1958 paper a typographical error occurred, with the print misspelling it as 'Cretalamna' . Glickman pointed out the spelling as an error and continued to use his intended spelling 'Cretolamna' in later works. This spelling was universally adopted until 1999 when Siversson remarked that this violates ICZN Articles 32 and 33, reinstating 'Cretalamna' as the valid spelling. Since then, the reinstatement of 'Cretalamna' gained prominence and by the 2010s, was accepted by the majority of paleontologists. However, some paleontologists including Cappetta strongly opposed it. In an attempt to suppress the usage of 'Cretalamna' , Cappetta appealed to a representative of the ICZN, arguing that the original intentions of Glickman and the prevailing usage of 'Cretolamna' prior to Siversson (1999) secures its priority. The ICZN, who reportedly were impressed by Cappetta's "spirit", subsequently erected Article 33.3.1 of the 2000 Edition of the Code in order to address this situation in the future, which states that "when an unjustified emendation is in prevailing usage and is attributed to the original author and date it is deemed to be a justified emendation". While Cappetta argued in a 2012 handbook that this new provision justifies the priority of 'Cretolamna' due to the spelling's overwhelmingly prevailing usage prior to its replacement by Siversson in 1999, Siversson himself pointed out in a 2015 paper that the provision cannot be worked retroactively, and that the continued prevailing usage of 'Cretalamna' since the provision's establishment ironically secures its priority rather than threaten it. 'Cretalamna' currently remains as the most prevalent spelling and paleontologists have expressed the unlikeliness of a return to the usage of 'Cretolamna' .

== Description ==
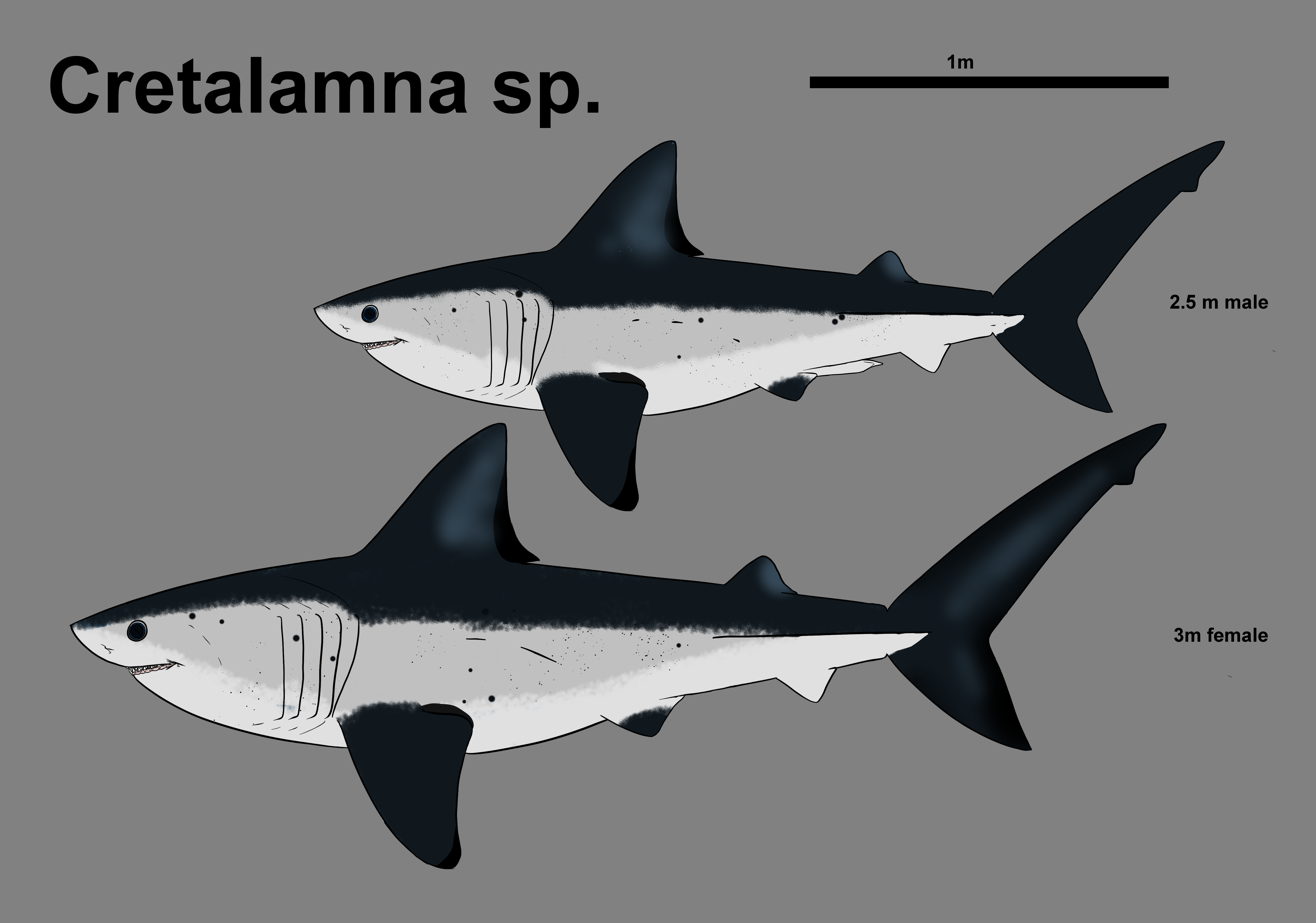
Life restoration, showing a porbeagle or salmon shark-like profile

Cretalamna was a medium to large-sized shark. Based on vertebral comparisons with various extant lamniforms and Cretoxyrhina, a 2007 study by Kenshu Shimada estimated a total length of 2.3–3.0 metres (8–10 ft) for the most complete skeleton of a large individual (LACM 128126; C. hattini holotype). Shimada previously discovered that the total length of lamniform sharks is positively correlated with the size of their teeth in a reasonably linear relationship; thus, Shimada (2007)'s estimates enabled size estimations for Cretalamna based on teeth alone. Subsequently, in 2019, the teeth of C. appendiculata from Himedo Park, Kugushima and Wadanohana which are larger than those in LACM 128126 yielded maximum length estimates of up to 3.4 metres (11 ft), 4.5 metres (15 ft) and 5 meters (16 ft), respectively. In 2020, Shimada and colleagues estimated the maximum possible length of C. borealis up to 3.5 meters (11 ft) based on an upper jaw tooth specimen (LO 11350t) from Åsen locality.

=== Body ===
The body plan of Cretalamna is almost completely known, informed by near-complete fossil impressions with soft tissue preserving the shark's outline from the Hjoula lagerstätte in Lebanon as documented by Pfiel (2021) and Greenfield (2022). It was most similar to the porbeagle and salmon sharks in build, with a compact fusiform body, large pectoral and first dorsal fins and tail, and small second dorsal, pelvic, and anal fins. The first dorsal fin was positioned directly above the pectoral fins unlike its analog species, where the first dorsal fin is usually positioned behind it. The tail fin was semi-lunate, similar to the whale shark. Such a body plan is indicative of an active fast-swimming pelagic shark likely partially warm-blooded through regional endothermy. In their 2024 study's appendix, Sternes and colleagues questioned this particular specimen's authenticity and anatomical parts which can only be speculated by photographs and its uncertain catalog status did not allow the reproducibility of the proportions suggested by Greenfield (2022).

=== Dentition ===
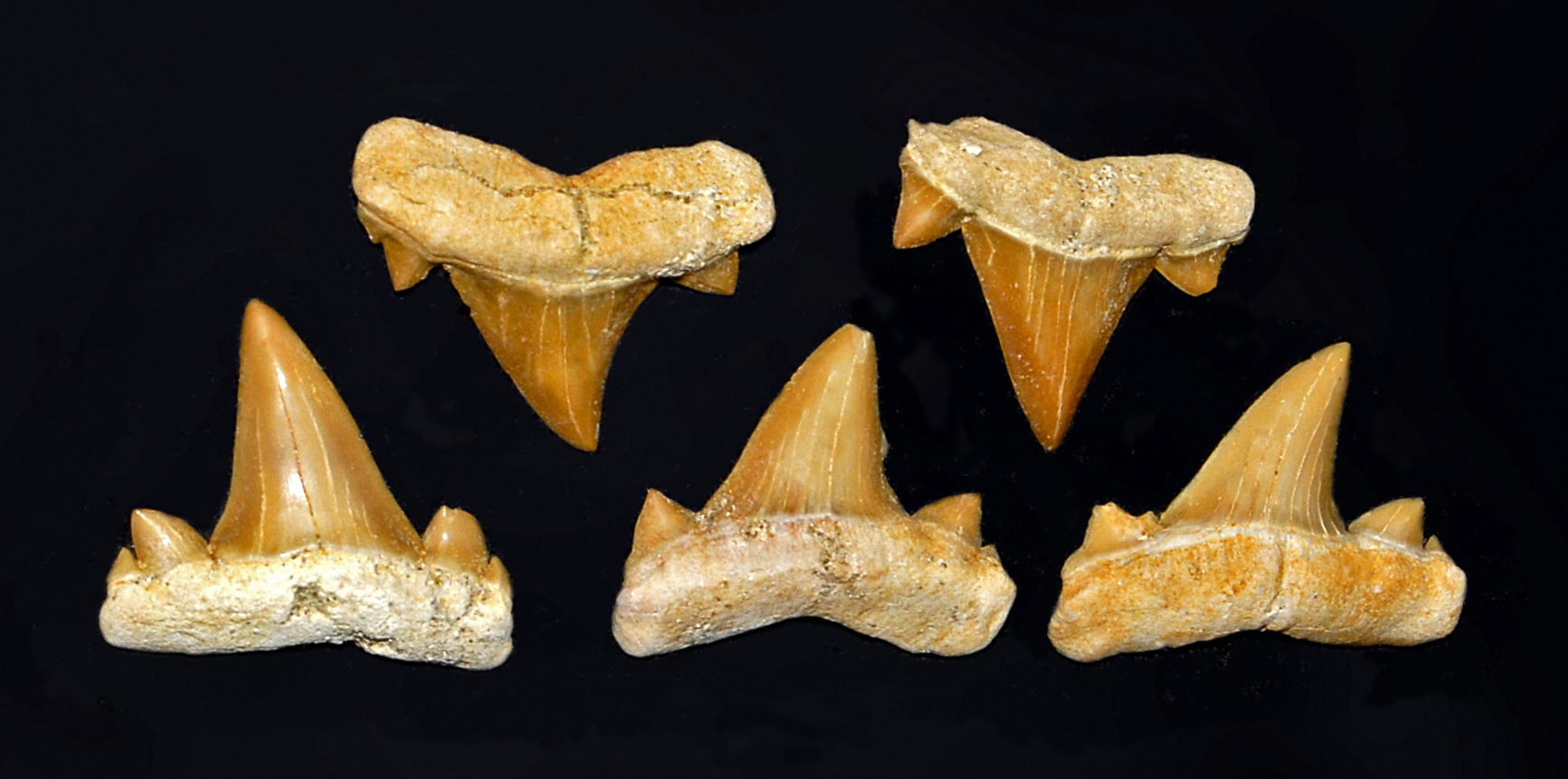
Fossil teeth of C. biauriculata from Khouribga (Morocco)

Cretalamna teeth are distinguished by a broad triangular cusp and two lateral cusplets. The cutting edges of the teeth are razor-like, while the sides have a smooth surface. Teeth symmetry is variable; some have exact bilateral symmetry whereas others have high asymmetry. Adjacent teeth do not overlap.

The exact dentition of Cretalamna is uncertain due to poor fossil representation. Traditionally, most reconstructions of its dentition were constructed from individual shed teeth. Based on a specimen of C. hattini (LACM 128126), the dentition of the shark follows a lamnoid pattern with at least fifteen upper tooth rows and eight lower tooth rows on each side of the jaw. The upper tooth rows contain, from front to back: two symphysial, two anterior, one intermediate, and ten lateral tooth rows. The lower tooth rows contain: two anterior, one intermediate, and five lateral tooth rows. This is given in the dental formula S2?.A2.I1.L10(+?)s?.a2.i1.l4, constructed in a 2007 study of LACM 128126 by paleontologist Kenshu Shimada. It is possible that Cretalamna contained more than two symphysial tooth rows, as the related Cretoxyrhina mantelli possessed four upper symphysial tooth rows.

=== Jaw ===
In C. hattini, the upper and lower jaws are similar to that of Cretoxyrhina mantelli. The jaws also resemble those of modern alopiids (thresher sharks) and lamnids. Limited fossil evidence suggests that the upper jaws extended over the lower jaws, giving Cretalamna a subterminal mouth.

== Paleoecology ==
=== Distribution ===
Cretalamna was a widespread genus found in North Africa (Morocco), the Near East (Jordan), West Africa (Mali), North America both on the East Coast and in the Midwest and Central America (Tonosí, Panama). Deposits in Morocco are usually Eocene in age; deposits in Jordan are of Cretaceous and Eocene in age; most deposits in the U.S. are of Cretaceous and Paleocene age; and deposits in Mali are of Cretaceous (Maastrichtian) age. C. maroccana is more prevalent in Morocco and Jordan, while C. appendiculata is more prevalent in the United States. Both species overlapped at one point in time.

=== Habitat ===
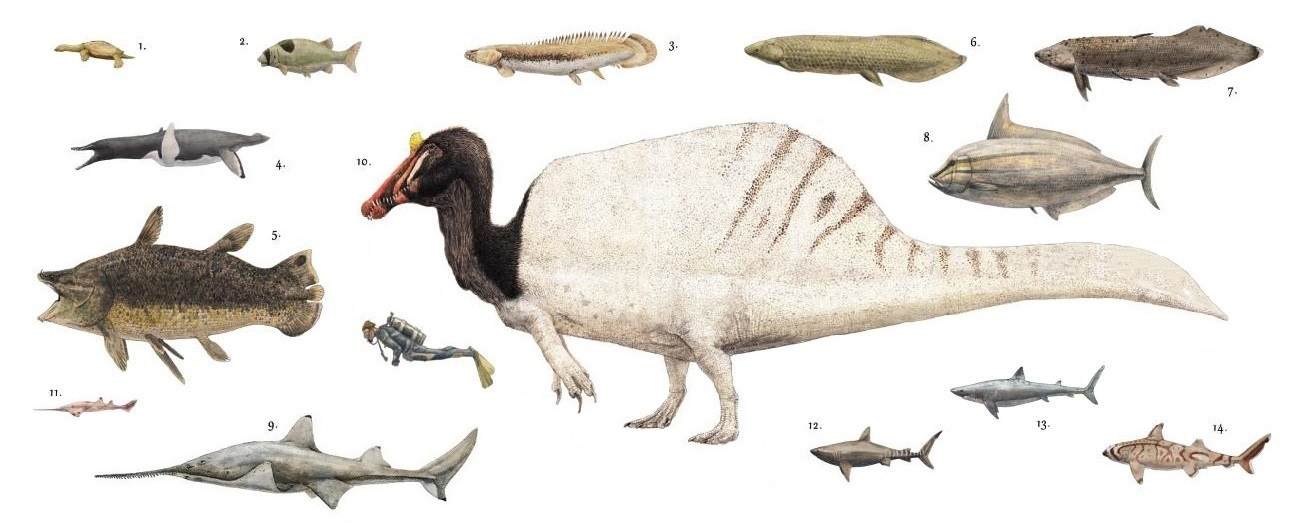
Outdated reconstruction of Cretalamna (13, lower right) with contemporaneous aquatic animals

Fossil evidence of Cretalamna is found in deposits representing a diverse set of marine environments, indicating that it was able to adapt to a wide range of habitats. This may have attributed to its ability to exist through a long temporal range. The fusiform body of Cretalamna suggests it was a pelagic shark.

The Cretaceous waters inhabited by Cretalamna were also home to a diverse range of cartilaginous fishes, bony fishes, turtles, squamates, plesiosaurs, pterosaurs, birds, and even some non-avian dinosaurs.

=== Diet ===
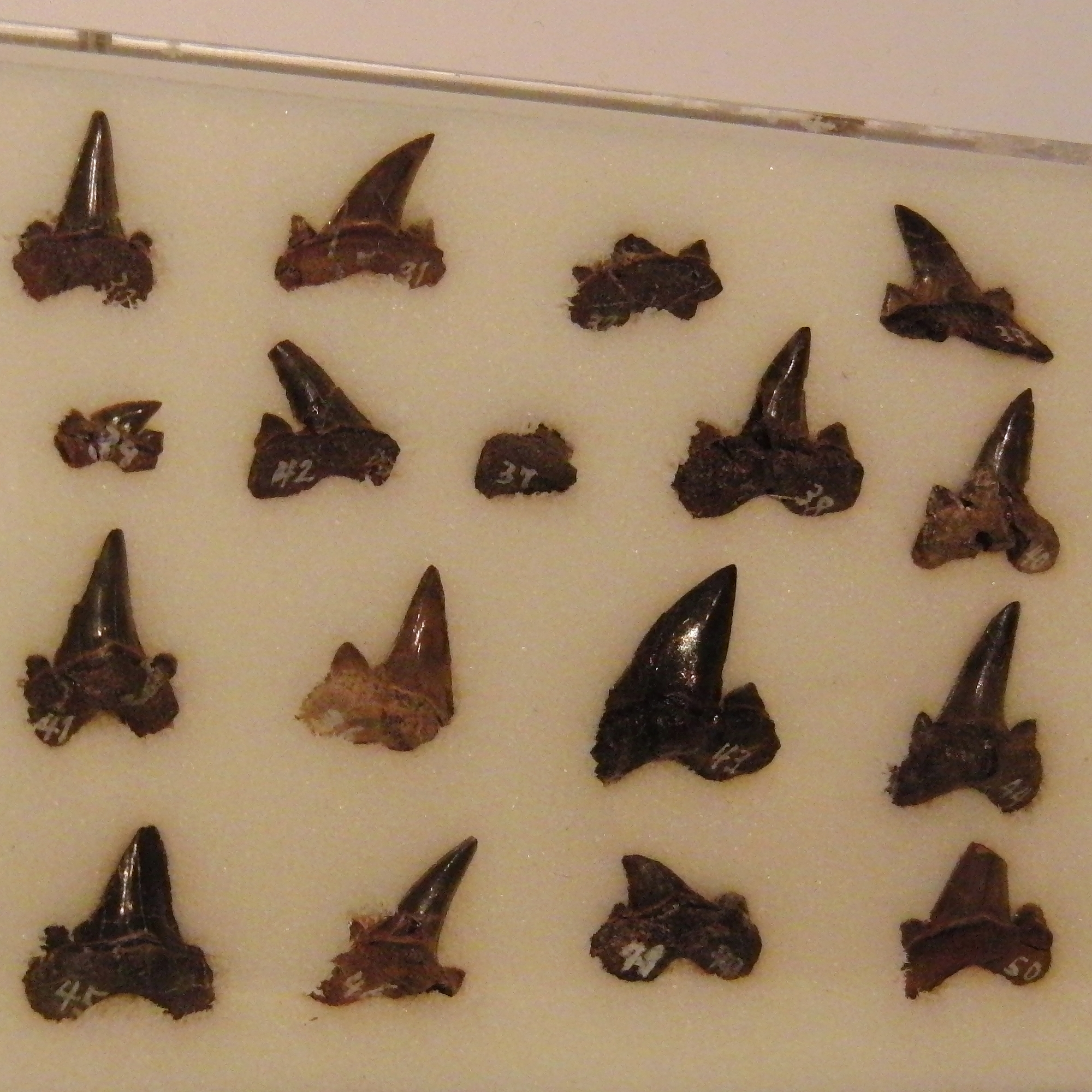
Teeth of C. appendiculata found with Futabasaurus

The tooth morphology of Cretalamna implies that it was a generalist. It was a predator and preyed upon large bony fish, turtles, mosasaurs, squids, and other sharks. For example, multiple teeth of C. appendiculata have been found around elasmosaurid Futabasaurus, suggesting it predated or scavenged that elasmosaur. Some tooth specimens of Cretalamna exhibit heavy wear—likely the result of drastic diet changes.

=== Extinction ===
A possible factor to the extinction of Cretalamna is increased competition with newer generalist sharks during the Cenozoic. It is widely believed that Otodus is derived from Cretalamna due to its strong similarity to certain species within the genus.

== See also ==
- Cretaceous sharks
- Prehistoric fish
- Squalicorax
