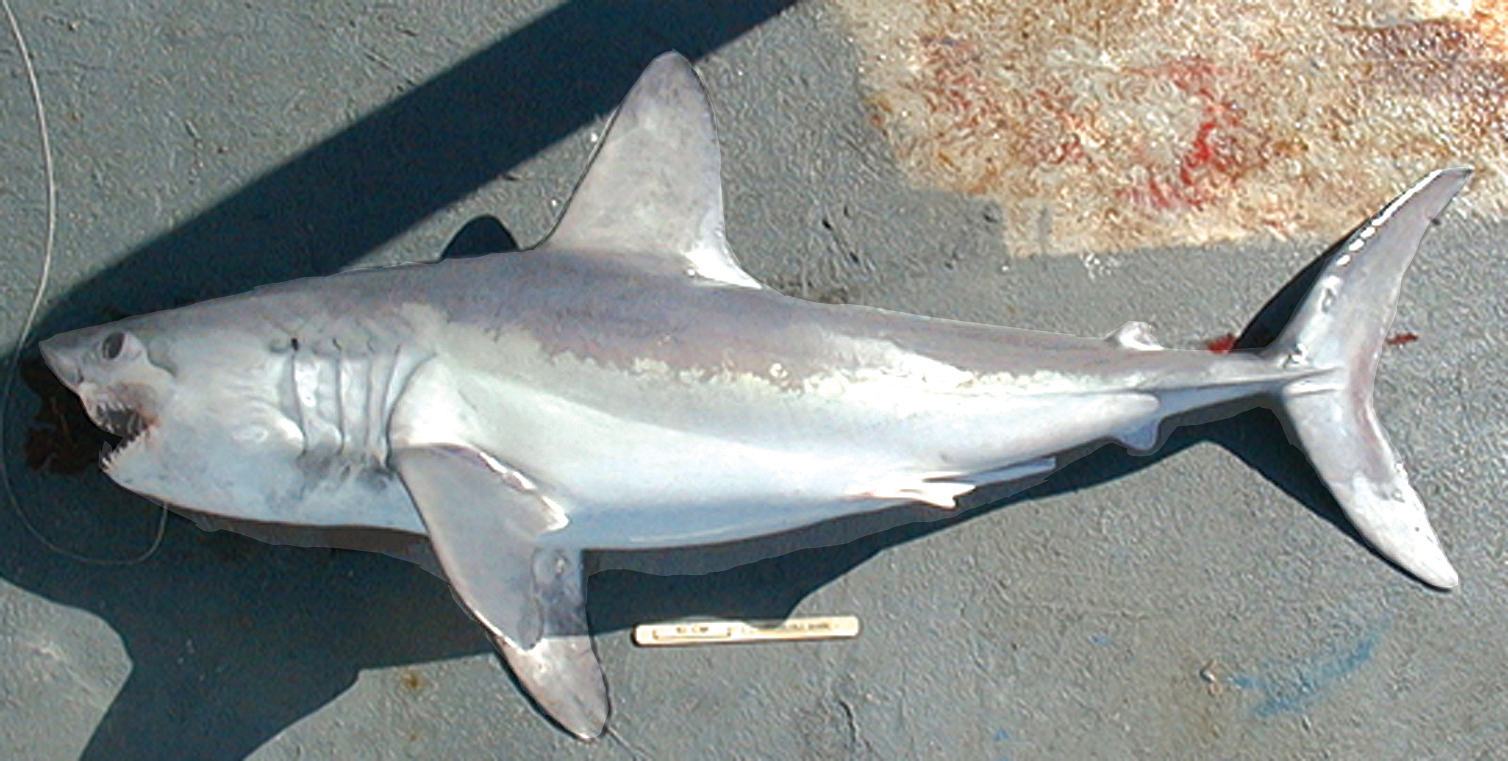
- Porbeagle (L. nasus)
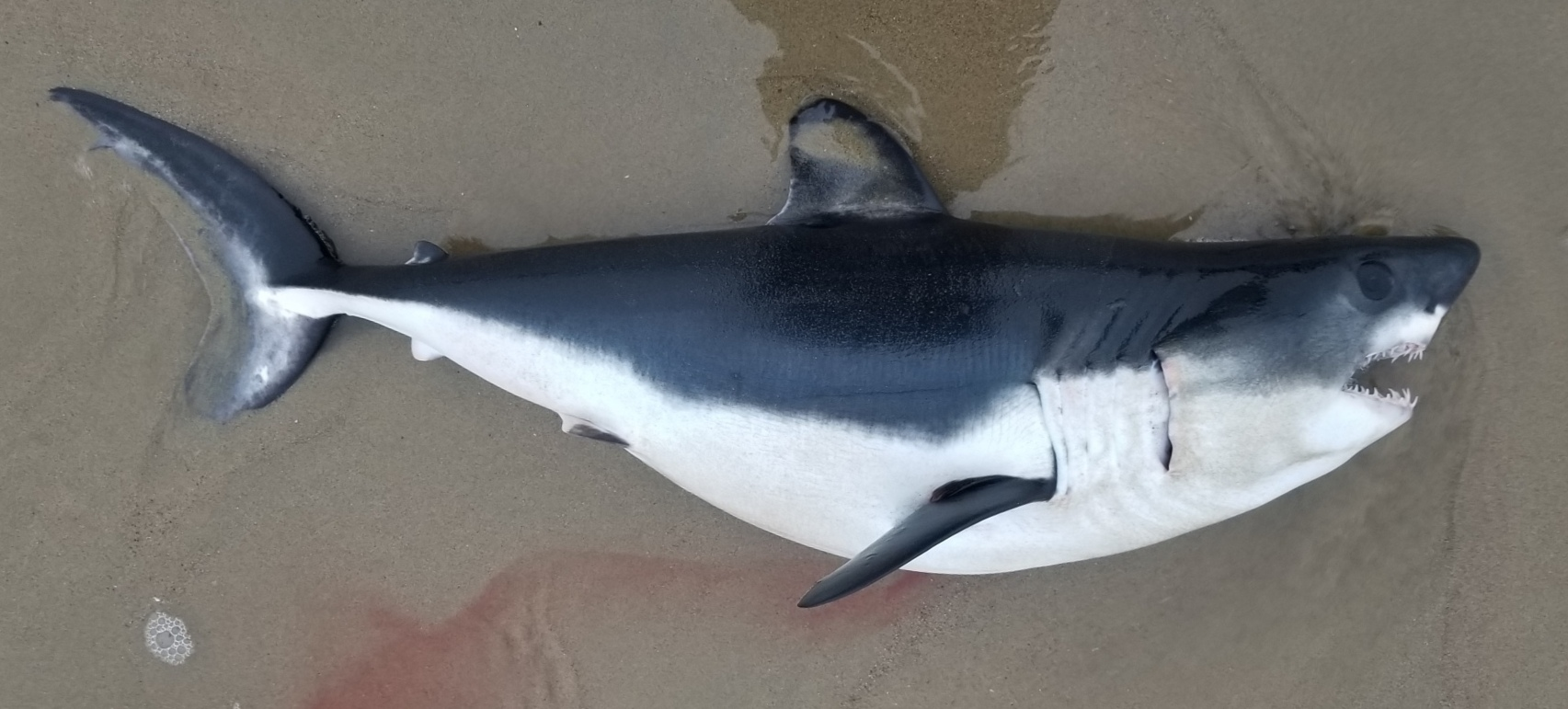
- Salmon shark (L. ditropis)

Scientific classification
- Kingdom: Animalia
- Phylum: Chordata
- Class: Chondrichthyes
- Subclass: Elasmobranchii
- Division: Selachii
- Order: Lamniformes
- Family: Lamnidae
- Genus: Lamna; Cuvier, 1816

Type species
- Squalus nasus Bonnaterre, 1788 porbeagle

Synonyms
- Exoles Gistel, 1848; Lamia Risso, 1827; Selanonius Fleming, 1828

= Lamna =

Lamna Temporal range: 65–0 Ma Earliest Paleocene to Present

Genus of sharks

Lamna is a genus of mackerel sharks in the family Lamnidae, containing two extant species: the porbeagle (L. nasus) of the North Atlantic and Southern Hemisphere, and the salmon shark (L. ditropis) of the North Pacific.

== Endothermy ==
The two species of this genus can keep their blood temperature higher above that of the water surrounding them than other cartilaginous fish, with temperature differences recorded up to 15.6 °C. Among fish, blood temperature regulation only occurs in large, fast species – bluefin tuna and swordfish are bony fish with similar abilities.

== Fossil Record and Species ==
The genus Lamna actually includes only two extant species: Salmon shark (Lamna ditropis) and Porbeagle (Lamna nasus). Most fossils of genus Lamna are found in deposits of Early Miocene and to the Pliocene, often confused with the genus Carcharias, Odontaspis and other genera. Some fossils of the genus Lamna have also been found in Paleocene and Eocene deposits, being almost entirely absent in the Oligocene period or confused and classified as Isurolamna.

=== Paleogene ===
- Lamna trigonata (Agassiz, 1843): Eocene, with possible Late Paleocene records. Found in Italy, North America, Asia and Russia.
- Lamna vincenti (Winkler, 1874): Early Paleocene to Middle Eocene. It was found in Italy, Europe, Belgium, Russia and Asia.
- Lamna attenuata (Davis, 1888): Late Oligocene-Early Miocene, was also placed in Odontaspis.
- Lamna rupeliensis (Le Hon, 1871): Early Oligocene, originally placed in Otodus genus. Was also proposed a own distinct genus, Rhizoquadrangulus.
- Lamna sp.: Eocene and Oligocene of Belgium, North America and Japan, It's similar to current L. nasus.

=== Neogene ===
- Lamna sp.: Similar to L. nasus.
- Lamna sp.?: Fossils similar both to the genus Carcharias and Lamna.
- Lamna cuspidata (Agassiz, 1843): Early Oligocene to Late Miocene, frequently classified as Araloselachus or Carcharias.
- Lamna nasus (Bonnaterre, 1788): Late Miocene to recent, currently known as the Porbeagle.
- The Salmon shark (Lamna ditropis) (Hubbs & Follett, 1947): Early Pliocene to recent.

== See also ==
- List of prehistoric cartilaginous fish
