= Tonosí Airport =

- IATA: none; ICAO: none; LID: PA-0026

Summary
- Airport type: Public
- Serves: Tonosí, Panama
- Elevation AMSL: 55 ft (17 m)
- Coordinates: 7°24′55″N 80°26′48″W

Map
- Location of the airport in Panama

Runways
Direction	Length		Surface
Direction	m	ft	Surface
18/36	705	2,313	Asphalt
- Sources: OurAirports Bing Maps

Tonosí Airport is an airport serving Tonosí, a village in the Los Santos Province of Panama.

The airport is 1 kilometre (0.6 mi) northwest of the village. The runway has 80 metres (260 ft) of unpaved overrun on the north end.

There is high terrain 5 kilometres (3 mi) southwest of the airport.

== See also ==
- Transport in Panama
- List of airports in Panama
