= Odontaspis attenuata =

Odontaspis attenuata Temporal range: Late Oligocene–Early Miocene, 28.1–21.6 Ma

Scientific classification
- Kingdom: Animalia
- Phylum: Chordata
- Class: Chondrichthyes
- Subclass: Elasmobranchii
- Division: Selachii
- Order: Lamniformes
- Family: Odontaspididae
- Genus: Odontaspis
- Species: †O. attenuata

Binomial name
- †Odontaspis attenuata (Davis, 1888)

Synonyms
- Lamna attenuata Davis, 1888

Fossil species of cartilaginous fish

Odontaspis attenuata is a fossil species of sand shark discovered in the Oamaru formation near New Zealand from fossilized teeth.

== Description ==
The teeth were narrow and tall, with a curved shape that was very rounded on the inside.

== Taxonomy ==
This shark was first described by the geologist James W. Davis in 1888 as Lamna attenuata. It was transferred to Odontaspis in 1924 by Frederick Chapman and F.A. Cudmore.
