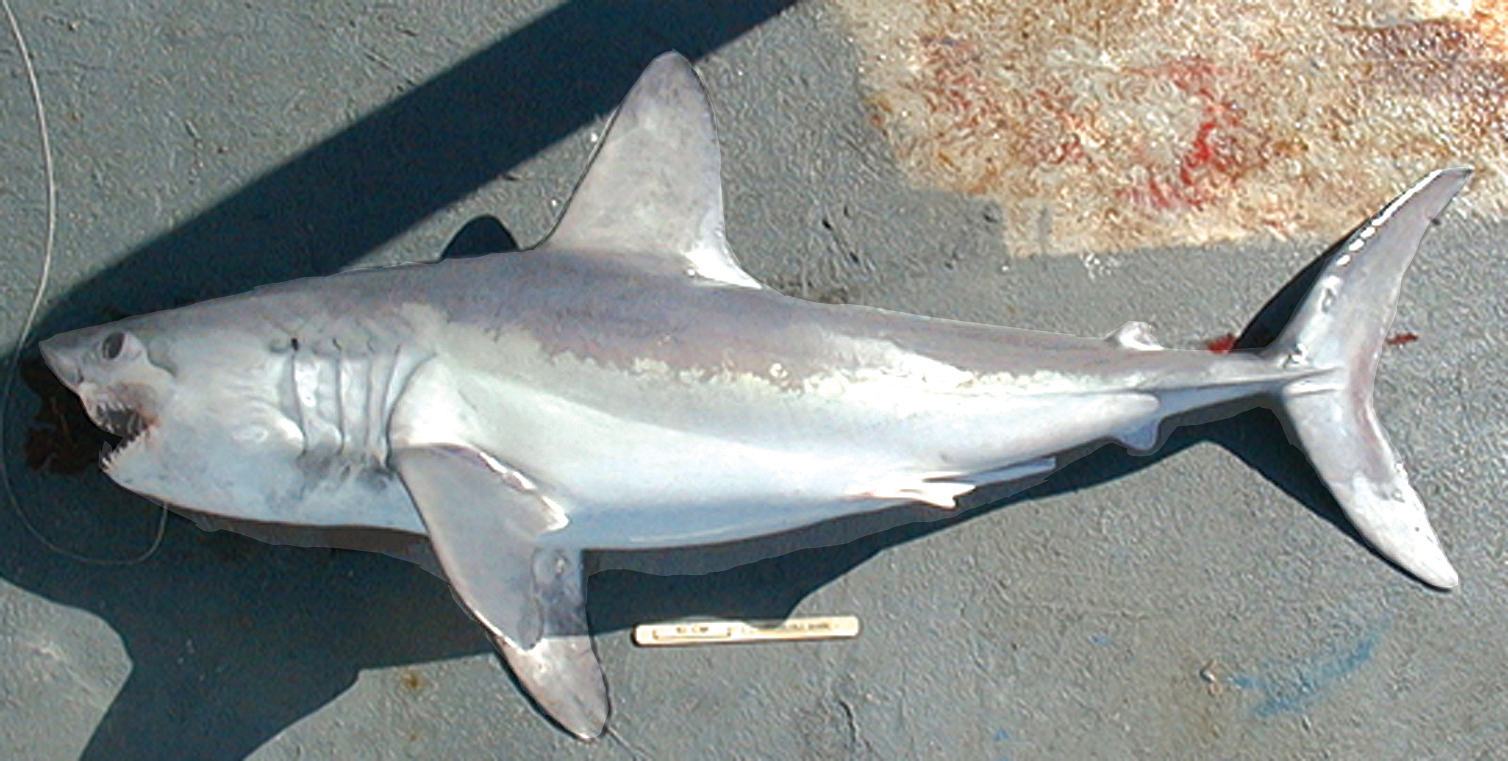

Conservation status
- Vulnerable (IUCN 3.1)
- CITES Appendix II

Scientific classification
- Kingdom: Animalia
- Phylum: Chordata
- Class: Chondrichthyes
- Subclass: Elasmobranchii
- Division: Selachii
- Order: Lamniformes
- Family: Lamnidae
- Genus: Lamna
- Species: L. nasus

Binomial name
- Lamna nasus (Bonnaterre, 1788)
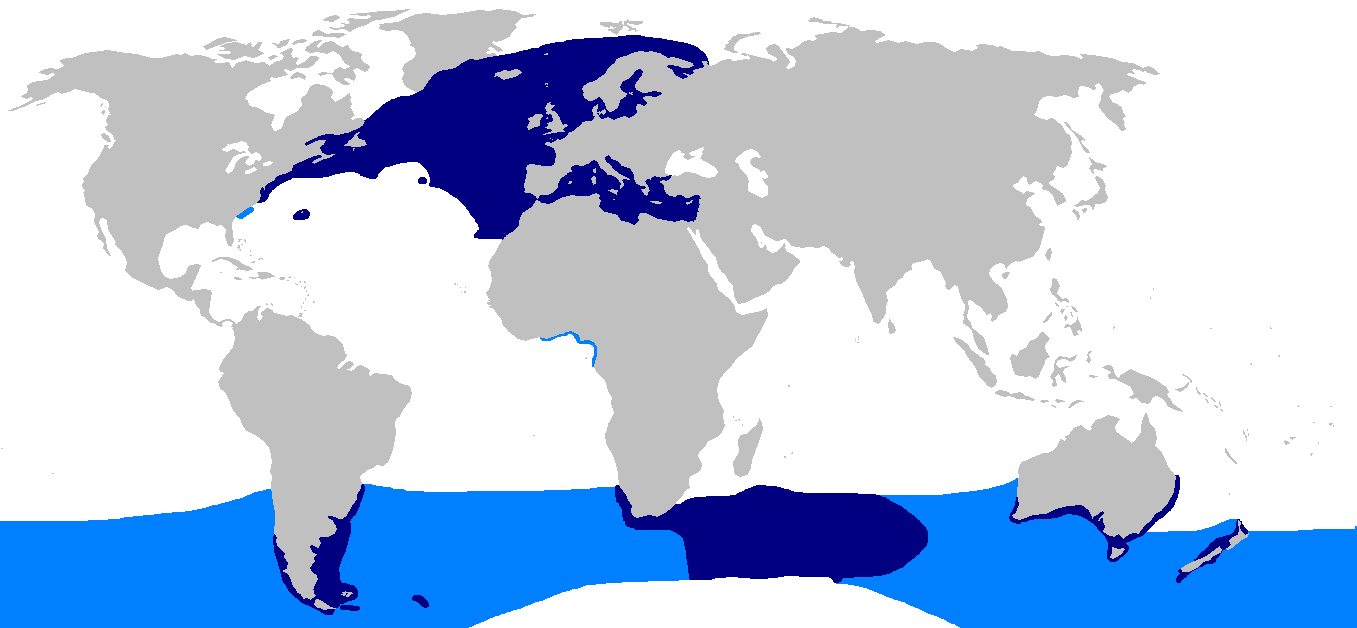
- Confirmed range Suspected range

Synonyms
- Lamna philippii Perez Canto, 1886; Lamna punctata Storer, 1839; Lamna whitleyi Phillipps, 1935; Oxyrhina daekayi Gill, 1861; Selanonius walkeri Fleming, 1828; Exoles cornubicus Gistel, 1848; Lamia cornubicus (Risso, 1827 [originally Squalus]); Lamia cornubica Risso, 1827; Squalus cornubicus Gmelin, 1789; Squalus cornubiensis Pennant, 1812; Squalus monensis Shaw, 1804; Squalus nasus Bonnaterre, 1788; Squalus pennanti Walbaum, 1792; Squalus selanonus Leach, 1818

= Porbeagle =

Porbeagle Temporal range: Late Miocene–recent, 7.2–0 Ma

Species of shark (Lamna nasus)

The porbeagle or porbeagle shark (Lamna nasus) is a species of mackerel shark in the family Lamnidae, distributed widely in the cold and temperate marine waters of the North Atlantic and Southern Hemisphere. In the North Pacific, its ecological equivalent is the closely related salmon shark (L. ditropis). It typically reaches 2.5 m (8.2 ft) in length and a weight of 135 kg (298 lb); North Atlantic sharks grow larger than Southern Hemisphere sharks and differ in coloration and aspects of life history. Grey above and white below, the porbeagle has a very stout midsection that tapers towards the long, pointed snout and the narrow base of the tail. It has large pectoral and first dorsal fins, tiny pelvic, second dorsal, and anal fins, and a crescent-shaped caudal fin. The most distinctive features of this species are its three-cusped teeth, the white blotch at the aft base of its first dorsal fin, and the two pairs of lateral keels on its tail.

The porbeagle is an opportunistic hunter that preys mainly on bony fishes and cephalopods throughout the water column, including the bottom. Most commonly found over food-rich banks on the outer continental shelf, it makes occasional forays both close to shore and into the open ocean to a depth of 1,360 m (4,460 ft). It also conducts long-distance seasonal migrations, generally shifting between shallower and deeper water. The porbeagle is fast and highly active, with physiological adaptations that enable it to maintain a higher body temperature than the surrounding water. It can be solitary or gregarious, and has been known to perform seemingly playful behavior. This shark is aplacental viviparous with oophagy, developing embryos being retained within the mother's uterus and subsisting on non-viable eggs. Females typically bear four pups every year.

Only a few shark attacks of uncertain provenance have been attributed to the porbeagle. It is well regarded as a game fish by recreational anglers. The meat and fins of the porbeagle are highly valued, which has led to a long history of intense human exploitation. However, this species cannot sustain heavy fishing pressure due to its low reproductive capacity. Direct commercial fishing for the porbeagle, principally by Norwegian longliners, led to stock collapses in the eastern North Atlantic in the 1950s, and the western North Atlantic in the 1960s. The porbeagle continues to be caught throughout its range, both intentionally and as bycatch, with varying degrees of monitoring and management. The International Union for Conservation of Nature (IUCN) has assessed the porbeagle as vulnerable worldwide, and as either endangered or critically endangered in different parts of its northern range.

== Taxonomy ==
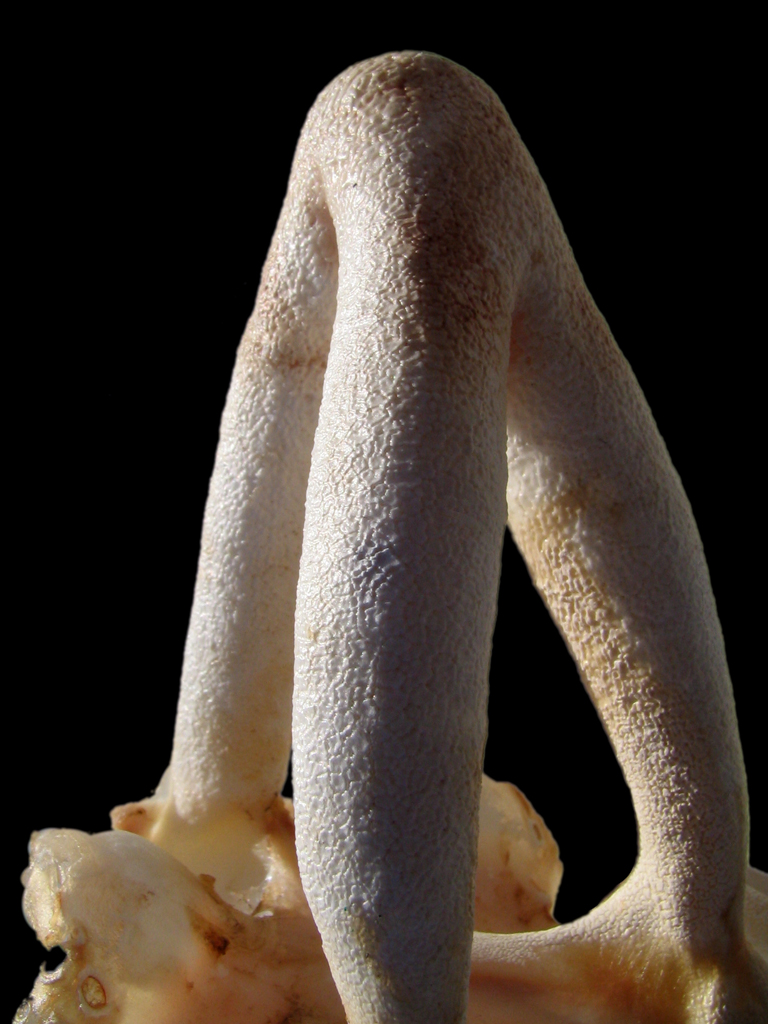
The calcified rostral (snout) cartilages of a porbeagle: Its specific epithet nasus means "nose".

The etymology of the word "porbeagle" is obscure. A common suggestion is that it combines "porpoise" and "beagle", referencing this shark's shape and tenacious hunting habits. Another is that it is derived from the Cornish porth, meaning "harbor", and bugel, meaning "shepherd". The Oxford English Dictionary states that the word was either borrowed from Cornish or formed from a Cornish first element with the English "beagle". The Dictionary also notes that no evidence exists for a connection to the French porc, meaning "swine", or to porpoise, as has been proposed. Other common names for the porbeagle include Atlantic mackerel shark, Beaumaris shark, bottle-nosed shark, and blue dog.

The first scientific description of the porbeagle was authored by French naturalist Pierre Joseph Bonnaterre in the 1788 Tableau encyclopédique et methodique des trois règnes de la nature, and based on an earlier 1769 account by Welsh naturalist Thomas Pennant. Bonnaterre named the shark Squalus nasus, the specific epithet nasus being Latin for "nose". In 1816, French naturalist Georges Cuvier placed the porbeagle into its own subgenus, Lamna, which later authors elevated to the rank of full genus.

== Phylogeny and evolution ==
Several phylogenetic studies, based on morphological characters and mitochondrial DNA sequences, have established the sister species relationship between the porbeagle and the salmon shark (L. ditropis), which occurs in place of it in the North Pacific. The genus Lamna evolved 65–45 Mya. When its two extant species diverged from each other is uncertain, though the precipitating event was likely the formation of the ice cap over the Arctic Ocean, which would have isolated sharks in the North Pacific from those in the North Atlantic.

Fossilized porbeagle remains are known from Late Miocene epoch (about 7.2 Mya) deposits in Belgium and the Netherlands, Pliocene epoch (5.3–2.6 Mya) deposits in Belgium, Spain, and Chile, and Pleistocene epoch (2.6 Mya to 12,000 BP) deposits in the Netherlands. However, Lamna teeth that closely resemble those of the porbeagle have been found in the La Meseta Formation on Seymour Island off the Antarctic Peninsula, which date to the middle to late Eocene epoch (50–34 Mya). Much taxonomic confusion remains regarding Lamna in the fossil record due to the high degree of variability in adult tooth morphology within species.

== Distribution and habitat ==
The porbeagle has an almost global amphitemperate distribution, i.e., it is absent from the tropics; in the North Pacific, where its ecological niche is assumed by the salmon shark. It is found mostly within 30–70°N and 30–50°S latitudes. In the North Atlantic, the northern limit of its range extends from the Newfoundland Grand Banks off Canada, through southern Greenland, to Scandinavia and Russia; the southern limit of its range extends from New Jersey and Bermuda, through the Azores and Madeira, to Morocco. It is found in the Mediterranean Sea, but not the Black Sea. Normally, North Atlantic sharks only stray as far south as South Carolina and the Gulf of Guinea, but pregnant females from the western North Atlantic population are known to range into the Sargasso Sea, almost as far as Hispaniola, to give birth. In the Southern Hemisphere, the porbeagle apparently occupies a continuous band bound in the south by the Antarctic Convergence, and extending as far north as Chile and Brazil, the Western Cape province of South Africa, Australia to southern Western Australia and southern Queensland, and New Zealand. In New Zealand it is most common south of the Cook Strait. The porbeagle is thought to have colonized the Southern Hemisphere during the Quaternary glaciation (beginning around 2.6 Mya), when the tropical climate zone was much narrower than it is today.

Offshore fishing banks are the favored habitat of the porbeagle, though it can be found from a depth of 1,360 m (4,460 ft) in oceanic basins to littoral (close to shore) waters less than 1 m (3.3 ft) deep, over the entire water column. A single, anomalous record was made of a juvenile in brackish water in Mar Chiquita in Argentina. A tracking study off the British Isles has found substantial variation in the short-term movements of this species, both between and within individuals. Vertical movements tended to increase with water depth and corresponding temperature stratification; in shallow, unstratified waters, sharks either showed no pattern in changing depth or made reverse diel movements, spending the day in shallow water and descending at night. In deeper, stratified waters, the sharks performed a regular diel migration, spending the day below the thermocline and rising towards the surface at night. The porbeagle has been reported across a temperature range of 1 to 23 °C (34 to 73 °F), with most records between 8 and 20 °C (46 and 68 °F). In a study that included 420 porbeagles caught in the northwest Atlantic off Canada, all were in water below 13 °C (55 °F) and the majority between 5 and 10 °C (41 and 50 °F).

Porbeagle populations in the Northern and Southern Hemispheres appear to be completely separate. Two stocks are in the North Atlantic, east and west, that seldom mix; only one individual is known to have crossed the Atlantic, covering 4,260 km (2,650 mi) from Ireland to Canada. Several discrete stocks are likely present in the Southern Hemisphere, as well. This species segregates by size and sex in the North Atlantic, and at least by size in the South Pacific. For example, males outnumber females 2:1 off Spain, females are 30% more numerous than males off Scotland, and immature males are predominant in the Bristol Channel. Older, larger sharks may frequent higher latitudes than younger individuals.

Seasonal migrations have been observed in porbeagles from both hemispheres. In the western North Atlantic, much of the population spends the spring in the deep waters of the Nova Scotia continental shelf, and migrates north a distance of 500–1,000 km (310–620 mi) to spend late summer and fall in the shallow waters of the Newfoundland Grand Banks and the Gulf of St. Lawrence. In December, large, mature females migrate south over 2,000 km (1,200 mi) into the Sargasso Sea for pupping, keeping deeper than 600 m (2,000 ft) during the day and 200 m (660 ft) at night so as to stay in the cooler waters beneath the Gulf Stream. In the eastern North Atlantic, porbeagles are believed to spend spring and summer in shallow continental shelf waters, and disperse northwards to overwinter in deeper waters offshore. Migrating sharks may travel upwards of 2,300 km (1,400 mi), though once they reach their destination they tend to remain within a relatively localized area. In the South Pacific, the population shifts north past 30°S latitude into subtropical waters in winter and spring, and retreats south past 35°S latitude in summer, when sharks are frequently sighted off subantarctic islands.

== Description ==
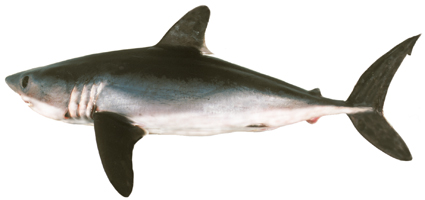
A Southern Hemisphere porbeagle showing the white patch on the rear tip of the first dorsal fin, which is unique to the species.

The porbeagle is a very stout-bodied shark with a fusiform (spindle-like) shape. The long, conical snout tapers to a sharp point, and is supported by enlarged, highly calcified rostral cartilages. The eyes are large and black, without nictitating membranes (protective third eyelids). The small, S-shaped nostrils are positioned in front of and below the level of the eyes. The mouth is large and strongly curved, with moderately protrusible jaws. North Atlantic sharks have 28–29 upper tooth rows and 26–27 lower tooth rows, while Southern Hemisphere sharks have 30–31 upper tooth rows and 27–29 lower tooth rows. Each tooth has a strongly arched base and a nearly straight, awl-like central cusp, which is flanked by a pair of smaller cusplets in all but the smallest individuals. The five pairs of gill slits are long and precede the pectoral fin bases.

The pectoral fins are long and narrow. The first dorsal fin is large and high, with a rounded apex, and originating just behind the pectoral fin bases. The pelvic fins are much smaller than the first dorsal fin. The second dorsal and anal fins are smaller still, and placed about even with each other on narrow bases that allow pivoting from side to side. The sides of the caudal peduncle are expanded into prominent lateral keels. A second, shorter pair of keels are present below the main keels. The caudal fin is large and crescent-shaped, with the lower lobe almost as long as the upper; both dorsal and ventral depressions (precaudal pits) are at the caudal fin base, and a deep ventral notch is near the tip of the upper caudal fin lobe. The skin is soft and covered by tiny, flattened dermal denticles (scales), lending a velvety texture. Each denticle has three horizontal ridges that lead to teeth on the posterior margin.

The dorsal coloration is a medium to dark gray or slate, extending to the bases of the pectoral fins. The underside is white; adults in the Southern Hemisphere often have dark coloring under the head and dusky blotches scattered over the belly. The free rear tip of the first dorsal fin is abruptly light gray or white, a feature unique to this species. The porbeagle may attain a length of 3.7 m (12 ft), though this is uncertain and may have resulted from confusion with other mackerel shark species. A more typical length is 2.5 m (8.2 ft). Female sharks grow larger than males in the North Atlantic, with maximum confirmed fork lengths (snout tip to caudal fin fork) of 2.5 m (8.2 ft) for males and 3.0 m (9.8 ft) for females. Southern Hemisphere sharks are smaller and the two sexes are similar in size, with males and females attaining fork lengths of 2.0 and 2.1 m (6.6 and 6.9 ft) respectively. Most porbeagles weigh no more than 135 kg (298 lb), with the record being a 230 kg (510 lb) individual caught off Caithness, Scotland, in 1993.

== Biology and ecology ==
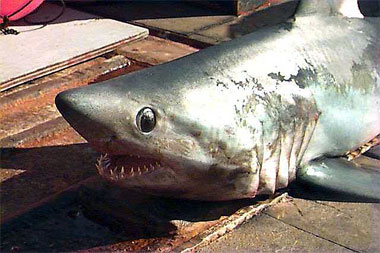
The streamlined shape and long gill slits of the porbeagle are adaptations for a fast, active lifestyle.

Fast and energetic, the porbeagle can be found singly or in groups. Its fusiform body, narrow caudal peduncle with lateral keels, and crescent-shaped tail are adaptations for efficiently sustaining speed, which have also been independently evolved by tunas, billfishes, and several other groups of active fishes. The salmon shark and it are the thickest-bodied members of their family (length-depth ratio approaching 4.5), and consequently have the stiffest swimming style; they oscillate their tails while holding their bodies mostly rigid, which confers propulsive power with high energy efficiency, but at the cost of maneuverability. The large gill surface area of the porbeagle allows more oxygen to be delivered to its tissues. It also has a short band of aerobic "red muscle" along each side, which can contract independently of the regular "white muscle" at a lower energy cost, enhancing the shark's stamina.

Porbeagles are among the few fishes that exhibit apparent play behavior. Reports, principally off the Cornish coast, have this species rolling and repeatedly wrapping themselves in long kelp fronds near the surface; this activity may have an exploratory or self-stimulatory purpose, though alternately, the sharks may be attempting to feed on small kelp organisms or scrape off parasites. In addition, porbeagles within a group have been seen chasing each other, and they will reportedly "play with anything floating on the water"; individuals have been observed prodding, tossing, or biting natural and artificial objects, including pieces of driftwood and balloon floats used by anglers.

Great white sharks (Carcharodon carcharias) and killer whales (Orcinus orca) are plausible, albeit undocumented, predators of the porbeagle. In one record, a small individual caught off Argentina bore bite marks from a copper shark (Carcharhinus brachyurus) or similar species, but whether the porbeagle was the target of attempted predation or if the two were simply involved in interspecific aggression is uncertain. Known parasites of this species include the tapeworms Dinobothrium septaria and Hepatoxylon trichiuri, and the copepods Dinemoura producta, Laminifera doello-juradoi, and Pandarus floridanus. Natural annual mortality is low, estimated to be 10% for juveniles, 15% for adult males, and 20% for adult females in the western North Atlantic.

=== Feeding ===
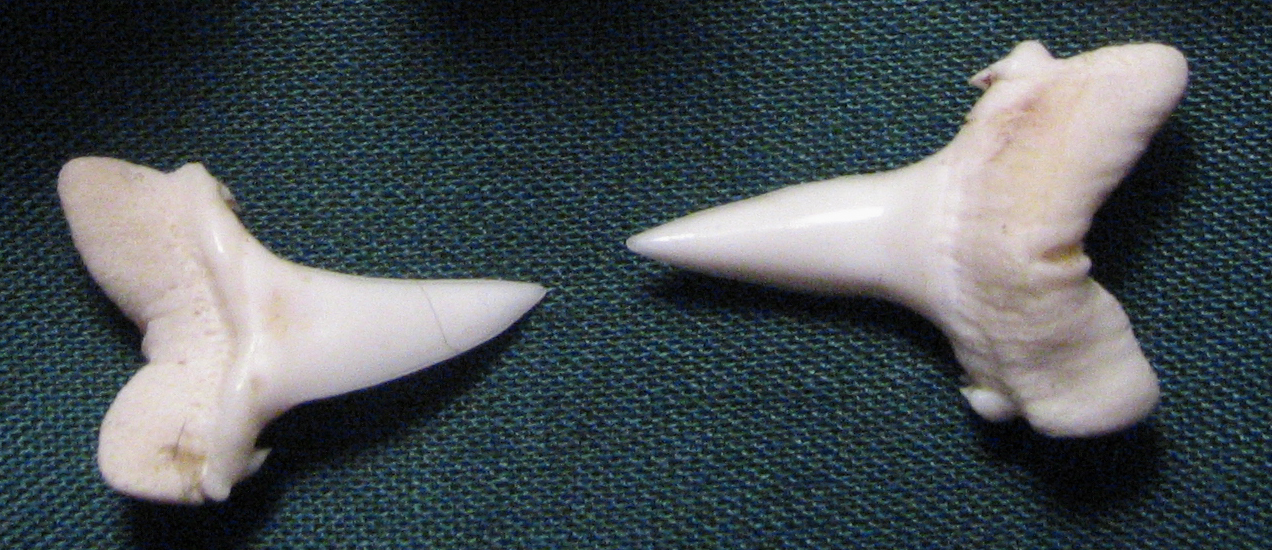
Porbeagle teeth are suited for grasping fish, with a long central cusp and a tiny cusplet on either side.

The porbeagle is an active predator that predominantly ingests small to medium-sized bony fishes. It chases down pelagic fishes such as lancet fish, mackerel, pilchards, herring, and sauries, and forages near the bottom for groundfishes such as cusk, haddock, redfish (i.e., Sebastes, Lutjanus, Trachichthyidae, and Berycidae), cod, hake, icefish, dories, sand lances, lumpsuckers, and flatfish. Cephalopods, particularly squid, also form an important component of its diet, while smaller sharks such as spiny dogfish (Squalus acanthias) and tope sharks (Galeorhinus galeus) are rarely taken. Examinations of porbeagle stomach contents have also found small shelled molluscs, crustaceans, echinoderms, and other invertebrates, which were likely ingested incidentally, as well as inedible debris such as small stones, feathers, and garbage fragments.

In the western North Atlantic, porbeagles feed mainly on pelagic fishes and squid in spring, and on groundfishes in the fall; this pattern corresponds to the spring-fall migration of these sharks from deeper to shallower waters, and the most available prey types in those respective habitats. Therefore, the porbeagle seems to be an opportunistic predator without strong diet specificity. During spring and summer in the Celtic Sea and on the outer Nova Scotian Shelf, porbeagles congregate at tidally induced thermal fronts to feed on fish that have been drawn by high concentrations of zooplankton. Hunting porbeagles regularly dive from the surface all the way to the bottom, cycling back every few hours; this vertical movement may aid in the detection of olfactory cues. A one-year-old porbeagle 1 m (3.3 ft) long, was reported to have had fed on krill and polychaete worms.

=== Life history ===
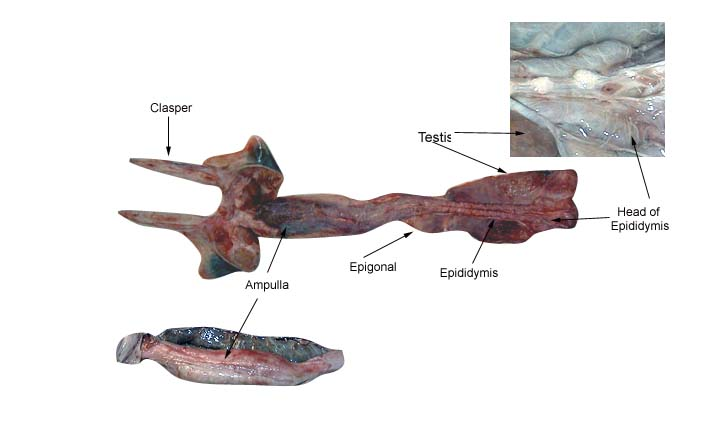

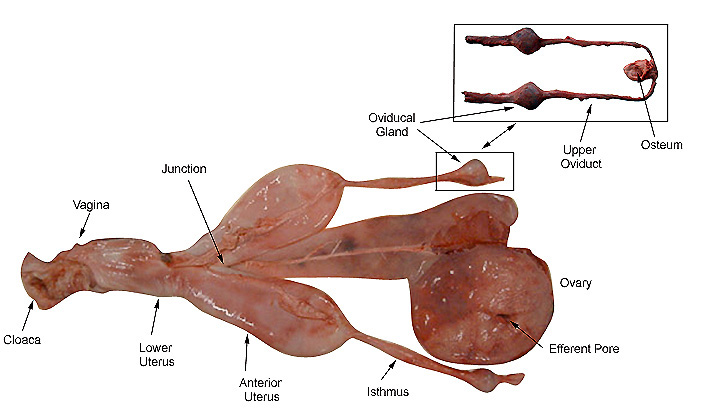
The male (top) and female (bottom) reproductive systems of the porbeagle (click to enlarge).

The timing of the porbeagle's reproductive cycle is unusual in that it is largely similar in both hemispheres, rather than being offset by six months. This suggests that its reproduction is not significantly affected by temperature or day length, perhaps owing to its endothermic physiology. Mating takes place mainly between September and November, though females with fresh mating scars have been reported as late as January off the Shetland Islands. The male bites at the female's pectoral fins, gill region, and flanks while courting and to hold on for copulation. Two mating grounds are known for western North Atlantic porbeagles, one off Newfoundland and the other on Georges Bank in the Gulf of Maine. Adult females have a single functional ovary, on the right, and two functional uteri. They probably reproduce every year. The litter size is typically four, with two embryos oriented in opposing directions sharing each uterus; on rare occasions, a litter may contain as few as one or as many as five pups. The gestation period is 8–9 months.

Like other members of its family, the porbeagle is aplacental viviparous with oophagy, i.e. the main source of embryonic nutrition are unfertilized eggs. During the first half of pregnancy, the mother ovulates enormous numbers of tiny ova, packed into capsules up to 7.5 cm (3.0 in) long, into her uteri. A newly conceived embryo is sustained by a yolk sac and emerges from its egg capsule at 3.2–4.2 cm (1.3–1.7 in) long. At this time, the embryo has well-developed external gills and a spiral valve intestine. When the embryo is 4.2–9.2 cm (1.7–3.6 in) long, it has resorbed its external gills and most of its yolk sac, but cannot yet feed, as it lacks the means to open egg capsules. At a length of 10–12 cm (3.9–4.7 in), the embryo grows two massive, recurved "fangs" in the lower jaw for tearing open capsules, as well as two much smaller teeth in the upper jaw. It begins to feed voraciously on yolk, acquiring an enormously distended stomach; to accommodate this, the muscles on the belly split down the middle and the skin on the abdomen stretches greatly.

At 20–21 cm (7.9–8.3 in) long, the embryo appears pink because it lacks pigment except in its eyes, and its head and gill regions are laterally enlarged and gelatinous. The yolk stomach can comprise up to 81% of the embryo's total weight when it is 30–42 cm (12–17 in) long. The embryo gains pigment and sheds its fangs at a length of 34–38 cm (13–15 in). Around this time, the mother stops producing ova. From then on, the embryo relies mainly on the yolk stored in its stomach, though it may continue to feed on remaining eggs by squishing the capsules between its jaws or swallowing them whole. It begins to transfer its energy stores from its stomach to its liver, causing the former to shrink and the latter to grow exponentially. The embryo is essentially fully pigmented by a length of 40 cm (16 in), and has assumed its newborn appearance by a length of 58 cm (23 in). By then, its stomach has shrunk enough for the abdominal muscles to close, leaving what has been termed an "umbilical scar" or "yolk sac scar" (neither is accurate). Several series of single-cusped teeth grow in both jaws, though they lie flat and remain nonfunctional until birth.

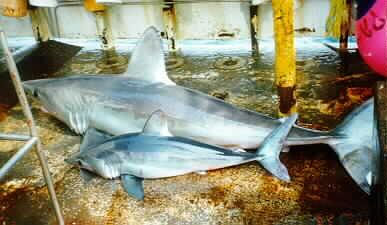
A juvenile porbeagle alongside an adult

Newborn porbeagles measure 58–67 cm (23–26 in) long and do not exceed 5 kg (11 lb). Up to a tenth of the weight is made up of the liver, though some yolk also remains in its stomach and continues to sustain the pup until it learns to feed. The overall embryonic growth rate is 7–8 cm (2.8–3.1 in) per month. Sometimes, one pup in a uterus is much smaller than the other, but otherwise normal. These "runts" may result from a dominant, forward-facing embryo eating most of the eggs as they arrive, and/or the mother being unable to provide an adequate egg supply for all her offspring. Birthing occurs from April to September, peaking in April and May (spring-summer) for North Atlantic sharks and June and July (winter) for Southern Hemisphere sharks. In the western North Atlantic, birth occurs well offshore in the Sargasso Sea at depths around 500 m (1,600 ft).

Both sexes grow at similar rates until the onset of maturation, with females maturing later and at a larger size than males. In the first four years of life, the annual growth rate is 16–20 cm (6.3–7.9 in) and similar in both hemispheres; thereafter, sharks from the western South Pacific begin to grow slower than those from the North Atlantic. In the North Atlantic, males mature at a fork length of 1.6–1.8 m (5.2–5.9 ft) and an age of 6–11 years, and females at a fork length of 2.0–2.2 m (6.6–7.2 ft) and an age of 12–18 years. In the Southwest Pacific, males mature at a fork length of 1.4–1.5 m (4.6–4.9 ft) and an age of 8–11 years, and females at a fork length of 1.7–1.8 m (5.6–5.9 ft) and an age of 15–18 years. The oldest porbeagle on record was 26 years of age and measured 2.5 m (8.2 ft) long. The maximum lifespan of this species appears to be 30–40 years in the Atlantic, but could be as much as 65 years in the South Pacific.

=== Thermoregulation ===
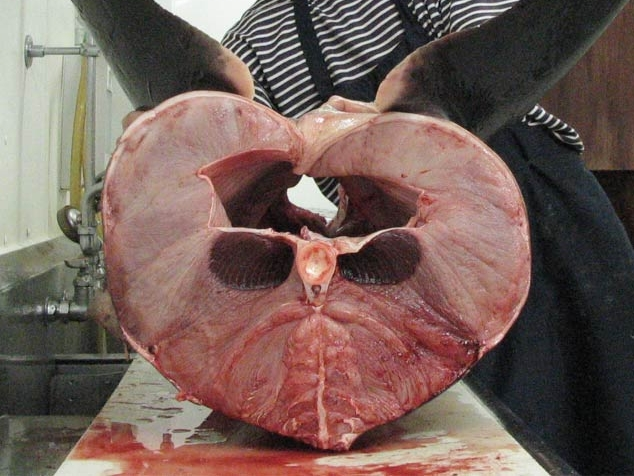
Cross-section through the trunk of a porbeagle (orientation is belly-up); note the central red muscles.

Like other members of its family, the porbeagle is endothermic; metabolic heat generated by its red muscles is conserved within the body by specialized systems of blood vessels called retia mirabilia (Latin for "wonderful nets"; singular rete mirabile), that act as highly efficient countercurrent heat exchangers. The porbeagle has several rete mirabile systems: the orbital retia accessing its brain and eyes, the lateral cutaneous retia accessing its swimming muscles, the suprahepatic rete accessing its viscera, and the kidney rete.

Among sharks, the porbeagle's capacity for elevating body temperature is second only to the salmon shark's. Its red muscles are located deep within the body, adjacent to the spine, and its lateral rete is composed of over 4,000 small arteries arranged in bands. It has one of the highest core temperatures within its family, 8–10 °C (14–18 °F) warmer than that of the surrounding water. Being warm-bodied may allow this shark to maintain higher cruising speeds, hunt in deep water for extended periods of time, and/or enter higher latitudes during winter to exploit food resources not available to other sharks. The orbital retia of the porbeagle can raise the temperature of its brain and eyes by 3–6 °C (5.4–10.8 °F), and likely serve to buffer those sensitive organs against the large temperature shifts that accompany changes in depth; potential benefits of this include increased visual acuity and reduced response times.

== Human interactions ==
The porbeagle has very rarely, if ever, bitten swimmers or boats. As of 2009, the International Shark Attack File attributes three bites to this species, one provoked and none fatal, and two on boats. One older anecdote tells of a fisherman who provoked a porbeagle into leaping from the water and tearing his clothes. In another account of a swimmer bitten by a "mackerel shark", the species responsible could easily have been a misidentified shortfin mako or great white shark. Recently in the North Sea, adult porbeagles have been filmed charging at divers working on oil platforms, sometimes even brushing lightly against them without doing harm. These rushes do not appear to have predatory intent and may instead be motivated by curiosity or defense.

On 14 May 2018, a porbeagle shark was reported to have bitten a fisherman off the coast of Cornwall, United Kingdom, as it was being returned to the sea.

At one time, porbeagles were regarded as nuisances by some commercial fishers because they damaged lighter fishing gear intended for smaller species and took hooked fish from lines. This shark is highly valued as a game fish by sport fishers in Ireland, the United Kingdom, and the United States. It fights strongly on hook-and-line, but does not usually jump into the air like the related shortfin mako shark. Novice anglers often mistake this shark for the mako, which has earned it the affectionate moniker "fako" in New England. The International Game Fish Association keeps records on the porbeagle.

=== Commercial fishing ===
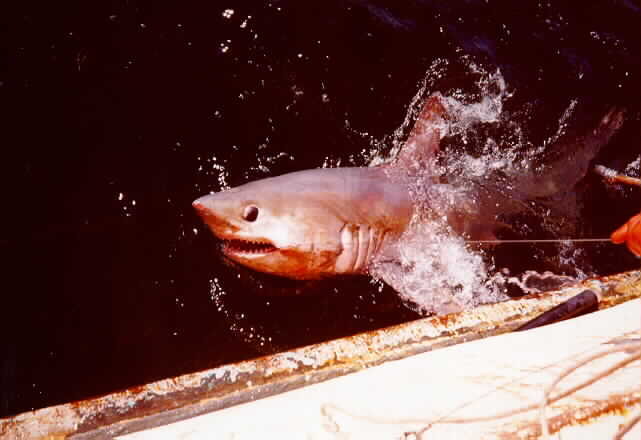
A porbeagle is hooked on a longline; this shark is valued by both commercial and recreational fishers.

Prized for its meat and fins, the porbeagle has long been under heavy fishing pressure. The meat is sold fresh, frozen, or dried and salted, and ranks among the most valuable of any shark: in 1997 and 1998, it had a wholesale price of 5–7 eur/kg, four times that of the blue shark (Prionace glauca). Most of the demand comes from Europe, though the United States and Japan also import this species. The fins are shipped to East Asia for use in shark fin soup. The remainder of the shark may also be used for production of leather, liver oil, and fishmeal. International trade in the porbeagle appears to be significant, but remains unquantified, as shark products tend not to be reported to the species level, and many consist of a mix of various species. This shark is caught most readily on longlines, but is also susceptible to gillnets, driftnets, trawls, and handlines. It is valuable enough to be generally retained when caught as bycatch; if storage space cannot be spared, it may be finned and the carcass discarded.

Intensive fishing for the porbeagle dates back the 1930s, when Norway and to a lesser extent Denmark began operating longline vessels in the Northeast Atlantic. The Norwegian annual catch rose from 279 tons in 1926 to 3,884 tons in 1933, and peaked at around 6,000 tons in 1947, with the resumption of fishing after World War II. Soon after, the stock collapsed; Norwegian annual catches declined steadily to 1,200–1,900 tons from 1953 to 1960, 160–300 tons in the early 1970s, and 10–40 tons in the late 1980s to early 1990s. Similarly, Danish annual catches fell from 1,500 tons in the early 1950s to under 100 tons in the 1990s. France and Spain began to target porbeagles in the Northeast Atlantic in the 1970s. French fishers operate mainly in the Celtic Sea and the Bay of Biscay, and saw a decline from an annual catch over 1,000 tons in 1979 to 300–400 tons in the late 1990s. Catches by Spanish fishers were highly variable, ranging from negligible to over 4,000 tons per year, which may reflect shifts of fishing effort into historically less-exploited waters. Since 2011, all fishing for the porbeagle has been illegal in waters of the European Union, and EU-registered vessels are also prohibited from fishing for the species in international waters. In 2012, similar restriction came into effect in Norway.

As porbeagles had become scarce in the Northeast Atlantic, in the 1960s, the Norwegian fishing fleet moved west to the waters off New England and Newfoundland. A few years later, they were joined by longline vessels from the Faroe Islands. Norwegian annual catches rose from 1,900 tons in 1961 to over 9,000 tons in 1965; the catch was largely exported to Italy, where porbeagle (smeriglio) is an extremely popular food fish. Again, the stock collapsed, this time in only six years; by 1970, Norwegian catches had fallen under 1,000 tons per year, and Faroese catches observed a similar trend. With the population decimated, most fishers moved on or switched to other species. Porbeagle numbers gradually recovered in the ensuing 25 years, to about 30% of pre-exploitation levels. In 1995, Canada established an Exclusive Economic Zone and became the primary fisher of porbeagles in the region. Between 1994 and 1998, Canadian fishing vessels landed 1,000–2,000 tons per year, which depleted the population to 11–17% of pre-exploitation levels by 2000. Strict regulations and greatly reduced fishing quotas introduced in 2000 have since begun to reverse the stock decline, though recovery of the stock is projected to take decades due to the low productivity of the species. Some evidence shows that incidental artificial selection caused by heavy fishing has led to a compensatory growth response, i.e. faster growth and earlier maturation.

In the Southern Hemisphere, commercial fishing for the porbeagle is mostly undocumented. Substantial numbers are caught incidentally by pelagic longline fisheries targeting more valuable species such as southern bluefin tuna (Thunnus maccoyii), swordfish (Xiphias gladius), and Patagonian toothfish (Dissostichus eleginoides), including vessels operated by Japan, Uruguay, Argentina, South Africa, and New Zealand. Porbeagle catches by the Uruguayan tuna pelagic longline fishery peaked in 1984 with 150 tons landed. Records of catch per unit effort for this fishery have shown a 90% decline in porbeagle landings from 1988 to 1998, though whether this reflects a real population decline or changing fishing habits is uncertain. New Zealand has reported annual catches of 150–300 tons, mostly of immature individuals, from 1998 to 2003.

== Conservation ==
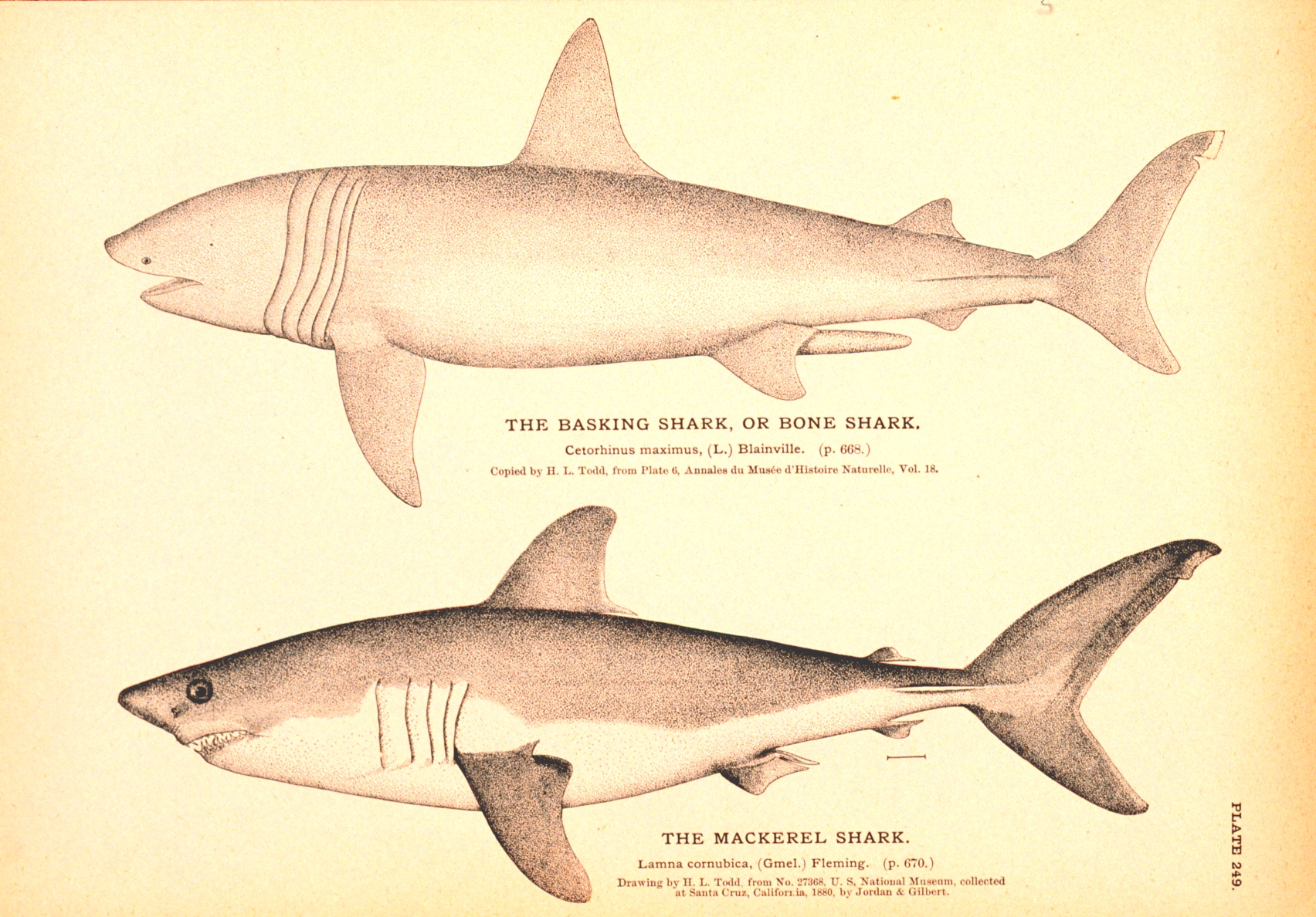
Historical illustration of a basking shark and a porbeagle (under the obsolete name Lamna cornubica), both commercially important species

The rapid collapse of porbeagle stocks on both sides of the North Atlantic is often cited as archetypal of the "boom and bust" pattern of most shark fisheries. Factors including a small litter size, long maturation time, and the capture of multiple age classes all contribute to this shark's susceptibility to overfishing. The International Union for Conservation of Nature has assessed the porbeagle globally as vulnerable, endangered in the western North Atlantic (including the Baltic), and critically endangered in the eastern North Atlantic and Mediterranean Sea.

The porbeagle is listed on Annex 1 (Highly Migratory Species) of the UN Convention on the Law of the Sea and on Annex 1 of the Conservation of Migratory Species (CMS; also known as the Bonn Convention) Migratory Shark Memorandum of Understanding. This species benefits from bans on shark finning instituted by several nations and supranational entities, including Canada, the United States, Brazil, Australia, the European Union, and the International Commission for the Conservation of Atlantic Tunas. Although the Animals Committee of the UN Convention on International Trade in Endangered Species of Wild Fauna and Flora (CITES) recommended additional conservation actions for the porbeagle, CITES rejected proposals to list the species in 2008 and again in 2010. In March 2013, the porbeagle was listed on Appendix II of CITES, allowing for increased regulation in the international trade of this species.

In March 2015, The National Marine Fisheries Service (NMFS) responded to a court order to compile information as to whether the shark will be listed as threatened or endangered under the Endangered Species Act.

=== Southern Hemisphere ===
The only regulation of porbeagle catches in the Southern Hemisphere is New Zealand's total allowable catch of 249 tons per year, instituted in 2004. In June 2018 the New Zealand Department of Conservation classified the porbeagle as "Not Threatened" with the qualifier "Threatened Overseas" under the New Zealand Threat Classification System.

=== Eastern North Atlantic and Mediterranean Sea ===
In the eastern North Atlantic, porbeagle fishing has been illegal in waters of the European Union since 2011. From 1985 and until the EU ban, the Faroe Islands and Norway (which are not members of the EU) were allowed annual quotas of 200 tons and 125 tons, respectively, from European Community waters. Although these quotas were lower than the originals set in 1982 (500 tons for Norway and 300 tons for the Faroe Islands), they were still consistently higher than the yearly total porbeagle catch in the region, thus had no practical effect. The species is included on the red list of Norway and it has been protected in their national waters since 2012. Any porbeagle caught in EU or Norwegian waters by accident must be released.

In the Mediterranean Sea, the porbeagle is on the verge of extinction, with a population decline over 99.99% since the mid-20th century. Its range has contracted to the waters around the Italian Peninsula, where a nursery area may exist. Only a few dozen specimens have been recorded in the past few decades, from scientific surveys, swordfish fishery bycatch, and sport fishers. In 1995, it was included in Annex III ("species whose exploitation is regulated") of the Barcelona Convention Protocol on protected areas and biodiversity in the Mediterranean, which has not been ratified. In 1997, it was listed on Appendix III of the Bern Convention (the Convention on the Conservation of European Wildlife and Natural Habitats). However, these listings have yet to result in the implementation of new management plans, despite the recognized need for urgent action.

The European Union prohibits EU vessels from fishing for, retaining, boarding, transhipping, or landing porbeagle sharks in all waters since January 2011. It is subject to a zero total allowable catch in EU waters by any vessel.

=== Western North Atlantic ===
The western North Atlantic porbeagle population has a more positive prospect than in the eastern North Atlantic. Fishing in Canadian waters was originally regulated by the 1995 Fisheries Management Plan for pelagic sharks in Atlantic Canada, which established an annual quota of 1,500 tons, restricted the time, place, and gear types allowed for commercial fishing, and set limits for bycatch and recreational fishing. In 2000–2001, Fisheries and Oceans Canada prepared a detailed population model and concluded that a quota of 200–250 tons would allow for population growth, resulting in a quota of 250 tons being adopted for the period of 2002–2007. The mating grounds off Newfoundland were also closed to shark fishing. In 2004, the Committee on the Status of Endangered Wildlife in Canada listed the porbeagle as endangered, largely on the basis of the low population abundance (<25% of original numbers). Canada decided not to list the species under its Species At Risk Act, but further reduced the total fishing quota to 185 tons. In US waters, the 1993 Fishery Management Plan for Sharks of the Atlantic Ocean sets an annual quota of 92 tons (after processing) for the porbeagle. In 2006, this species was listed as a species of concern by the NMFS, meaning that it merits conservation concern, but data are insufficient for inclusion on the US Endangered Species Act.
