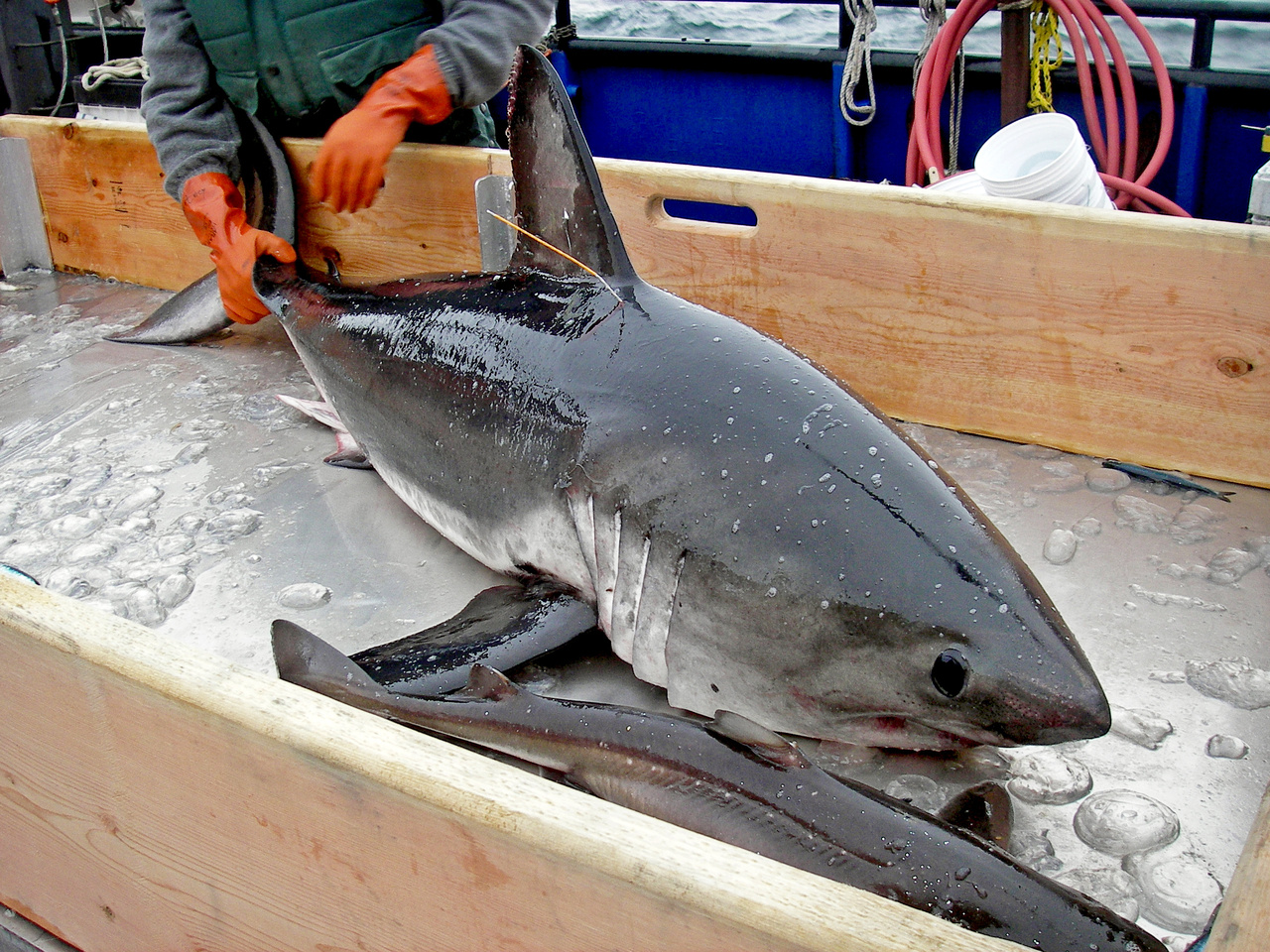
- Salmon shark caught off Alaska, United States.
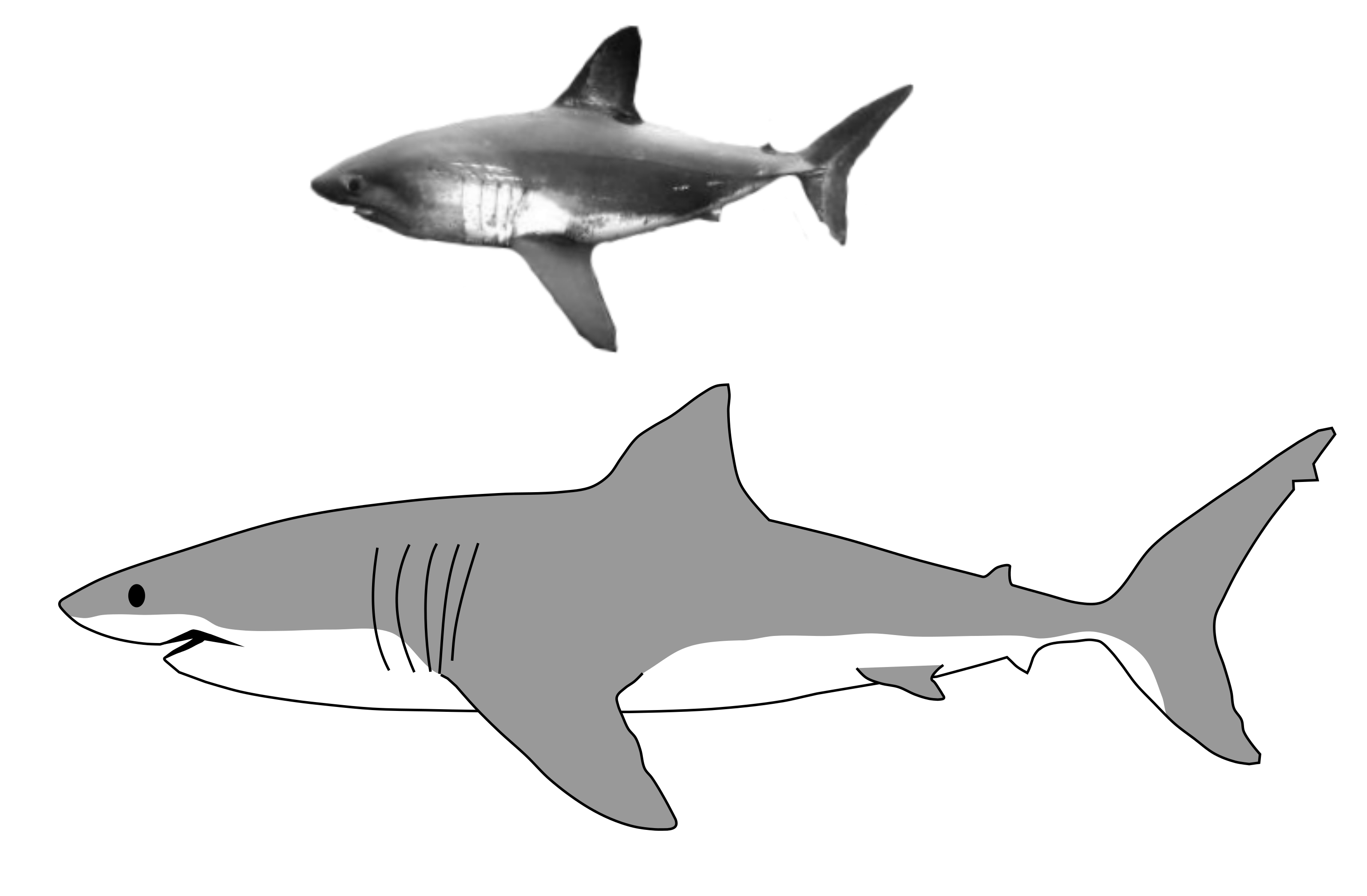
- Size comparison between a salmon shark of average size (top) and a great white shark of average size (bottom).

Conservation status
- Least Concern (IUCN 3.1)

Scientific classification
- Kingdom: Animalia
- Phylum: Chordata
- Class: Chondrichthyes
- Subclass: Elasmobranchii
- Division: Selachii
- Order: Lamniformes
- Family: Lamnidae
- Genus: Lamna
- Species: L. ditropis

Binomial name
- Lamna ditropis C. L. Hubbs & Follett, 1947
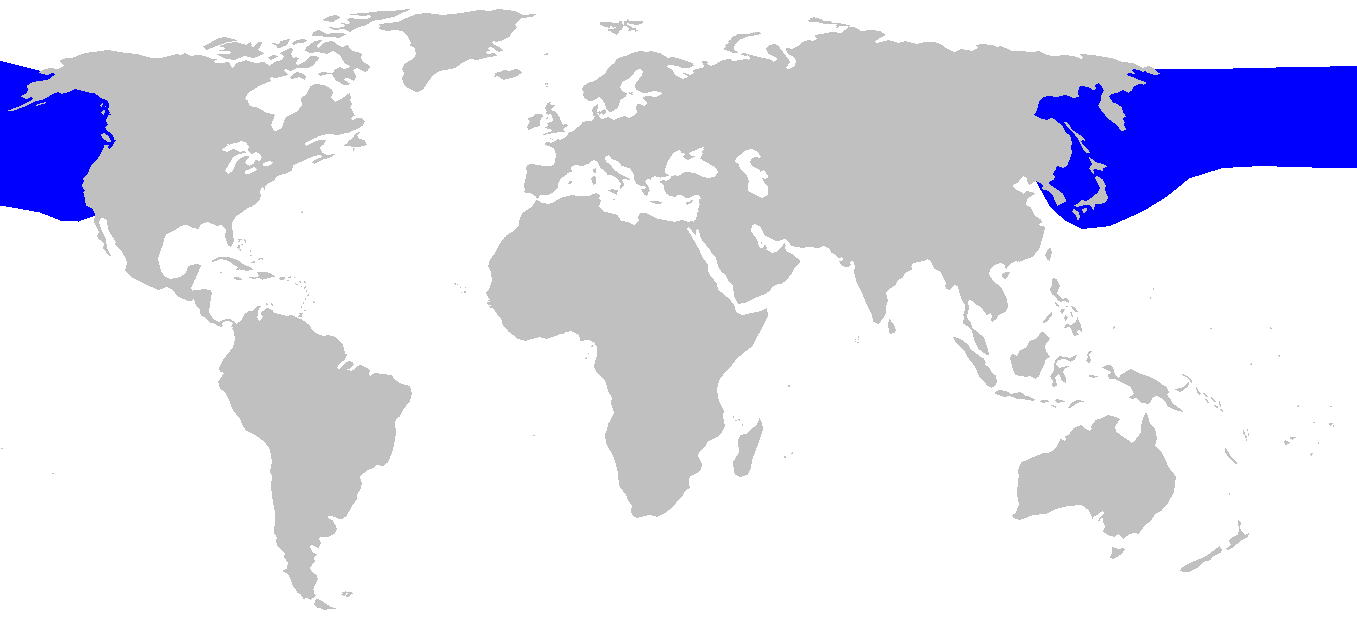
- Range of the salmon shark

= Salmon shark =

Salmon shark Temporal range: Piacenzian-recent, 3.6–0 Ma

Species of shark

The salmon shark (Lamna ditropis) is a species of mackerel shark found in the northern Pacific ocean. Similar to other mackerel sharks, salmon sharks have a thunniform body type. As an apex predator, the salmon shark feeds on salmon, squid, sablefish, birds, walleye pollock, and herring. Salmon sharks get their name from their diet, which primarily consists of salmon. It is known for its ability to maintain stomach temperature (homeothermy), which is unusual among fish. It is also known for an unexplained variability in the sex ratio between eastern and western populations in the northern Pacific.

== Description ==
Adult salmon sharks are medium grey to black over most of the body, with a white underside with darker blotches. Juveniles are similar in appearance, but generally lack blotches. The snout is short and cone-shaped, and the overall appearance is similar to a small great white shark. The eyes are positioned well forward, enabling binocular vision to accurately locate prey.

The salmon shark generally grows to between 200 and 260 cm (6.6–8.6 ft) in length and weighs up to 220 kg (485 lb). Males appear to reach a maximum size slightly smaller than females. Unconfirmed reports exist of salmon sharks reaching as much as 4.3 m (14.2 ft); however, the largest confirmed reports indicate a maximum total length of about 3.0 m (10 ft). The claims of maximum reported weight over 450 kg (992 lb) are "unsubstantiated".

Salmon sharks have a wide, double keeled tail (a second, short ridge that runs along the upper part of the lower lobe of the tail.) The only other shark with a double keeled tail is the porbeagle shark, which the salmon shark is closely related to. Salmon sharks are voracious group hunters. Groups of 30 to 40 individuals have been spotted hunting salmon in Alaska. Salmon sharks can also hunt alone, however individuals congregate in large groups in coastal waters to hunt bony fish such as salmon. Studies on prey consumption show that salmon sharks have similar energetic requirements as sea lions and other piscivorous marine animals.

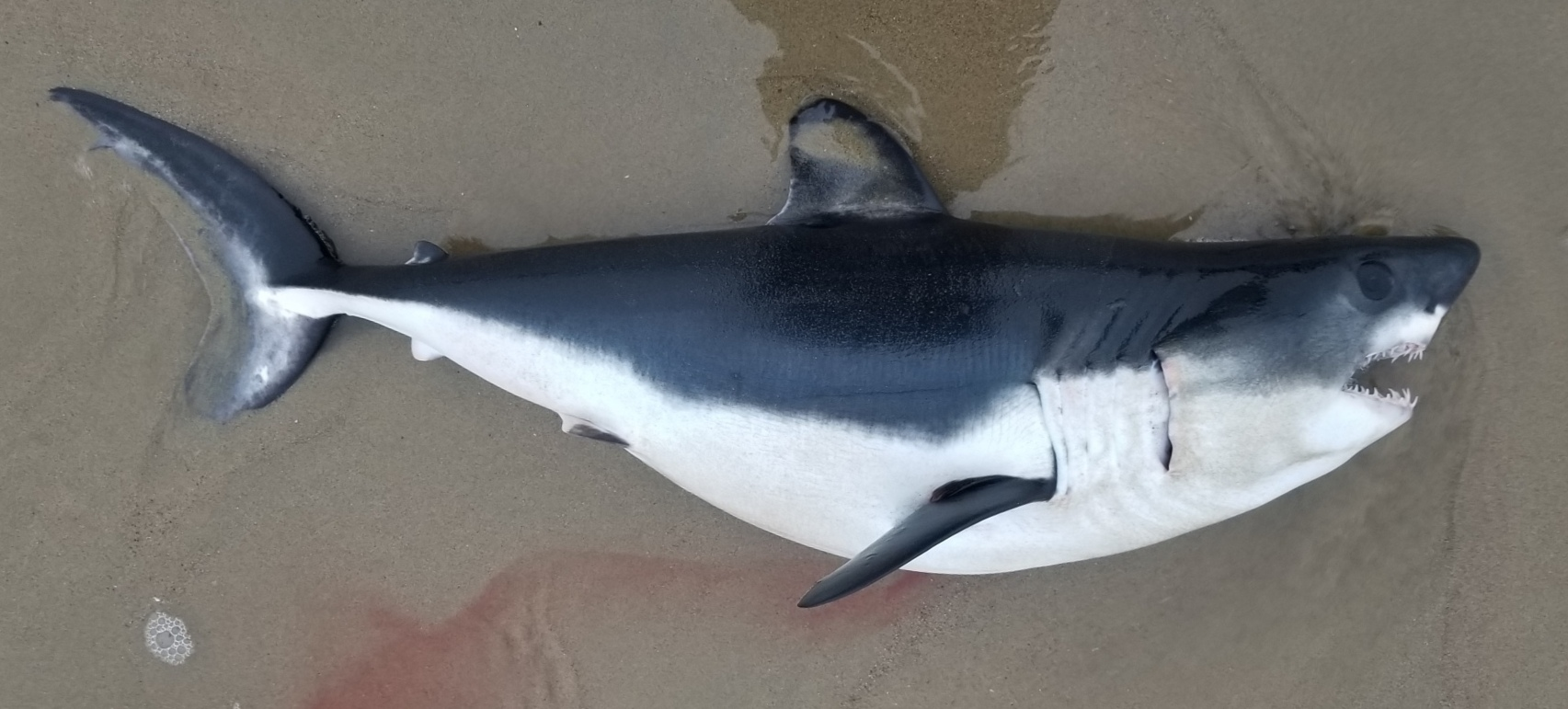
Countershading is especially pronounced in juvenile salmon sharks

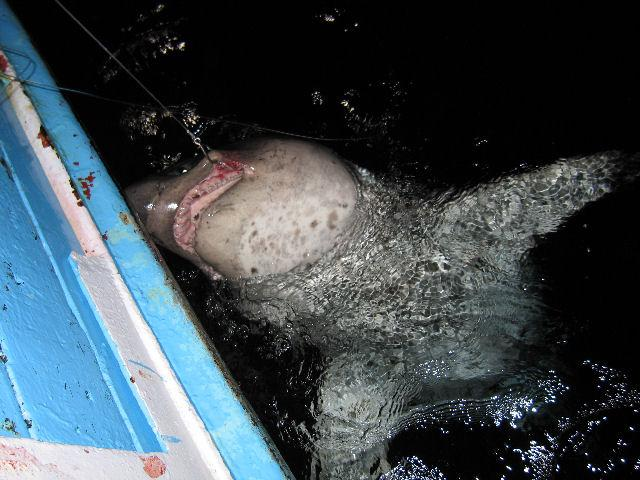
Adult salmon sharks feature dark mottling that extends into the white underside

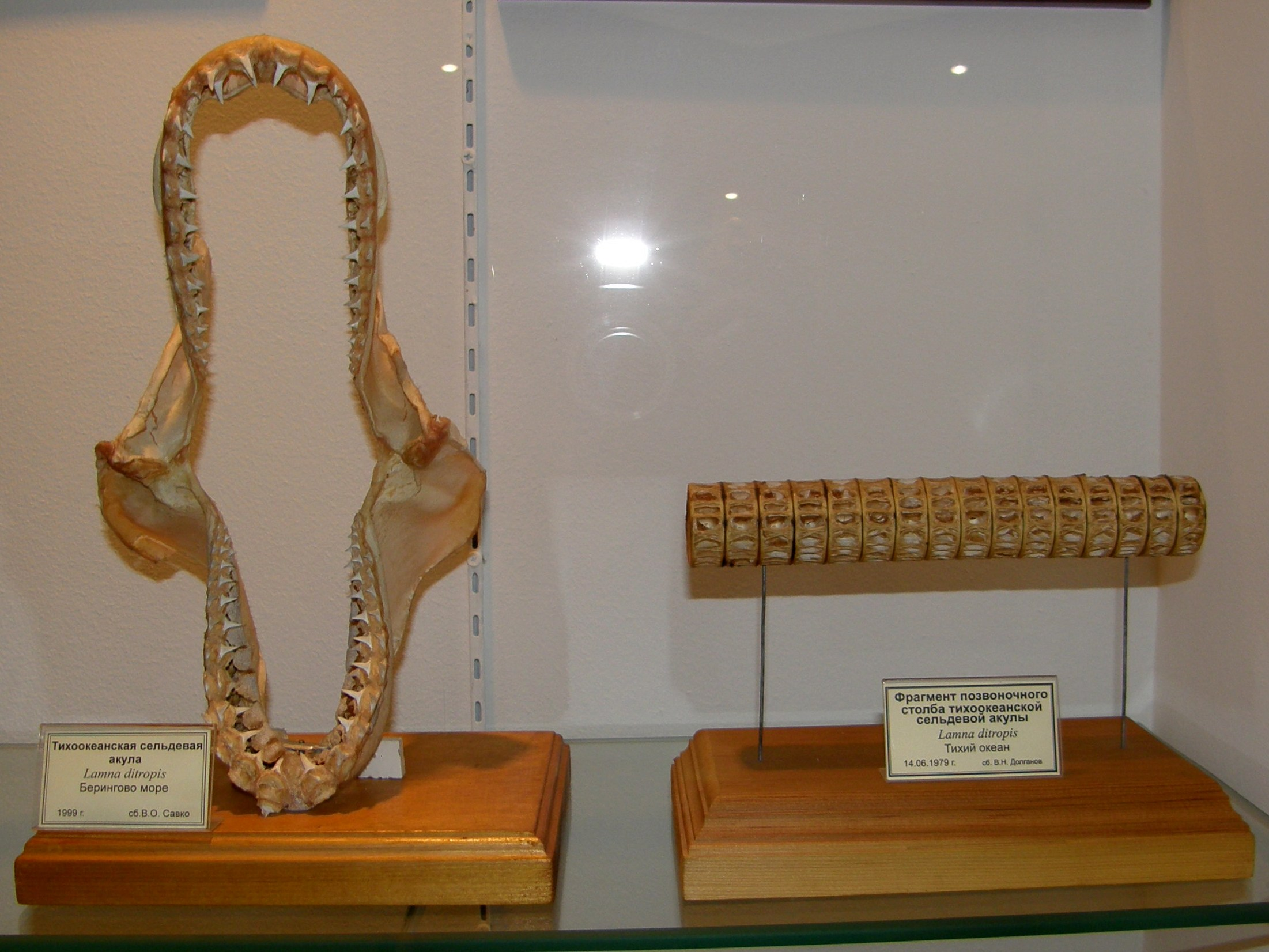
Jaws and segment of vertebrae

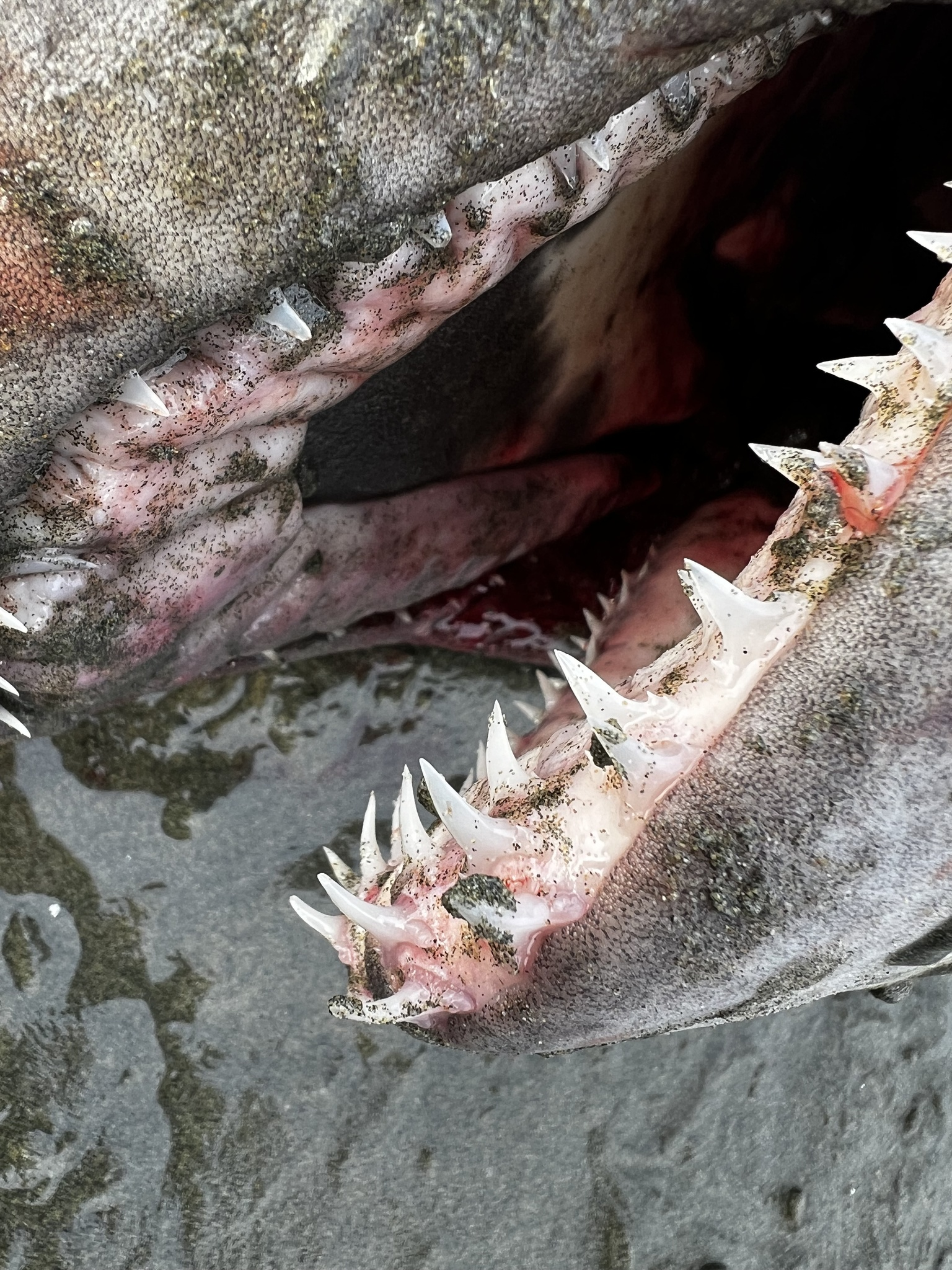
Teeth

== Biology ==
=== Reproduction ===
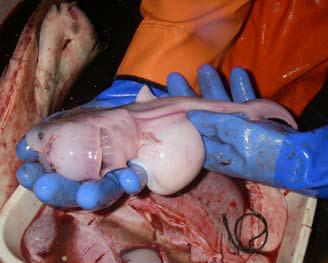
Salmon shark fetus

The salmon shark is ovoviviparous, birthing a litter of two to six pups. As with other lamniforme shark species, the salmon shark is also oophagous, with embryos feeding on the ova produced by the mother.

Females reach sexual maturity from eight to ten years; males generally mature by age five. Reproductive timing is not well understood, but it is believed the sharks are on a two-year cycle, with mating occurring in the late summer to early autumn. Gestation is around nine months. Some reports indicate the sex ratio at birth may be 2.2 (males to females), but the prevalence of this is not known. Once salmon sharks are born, they are completely independent. Pups are spawned along Baja California.

=== Homeothermy ===
As with only a few other species of fish, salmon sharks have the ability to regulate their body temperature. This is accomplished by vascular counter-current heat exchangers, known as retia mirabilia, Latin for "wonderful nets". Arteries and veins are in extremely close proximity to each other, resulting in heat exchange. Cold blood coming from the gills to the body is warmed by blood coming from the body. This results in blood coming from the body losing its heat so that by the time it interacts with cold water from the gills, it is about the same temperature, so no heat is lost from the body to the water. Blood coming towards the body regains its heat, allowing the shark to maintain its body temperature. This minimizes heat lost to the environment, allowing salmon sharks to thrive in cold waters.

Past studies have shown that the average surface body temperature for the Salmon shark is around 8°C, while the internal average body temperature was around 16–19°C relative to other sharks.

Their homeothermy may also rely on SERCA2 and ryanodine receptor 2 protein expression, which may have a cardioprotective effect.

== Range and distribution ==
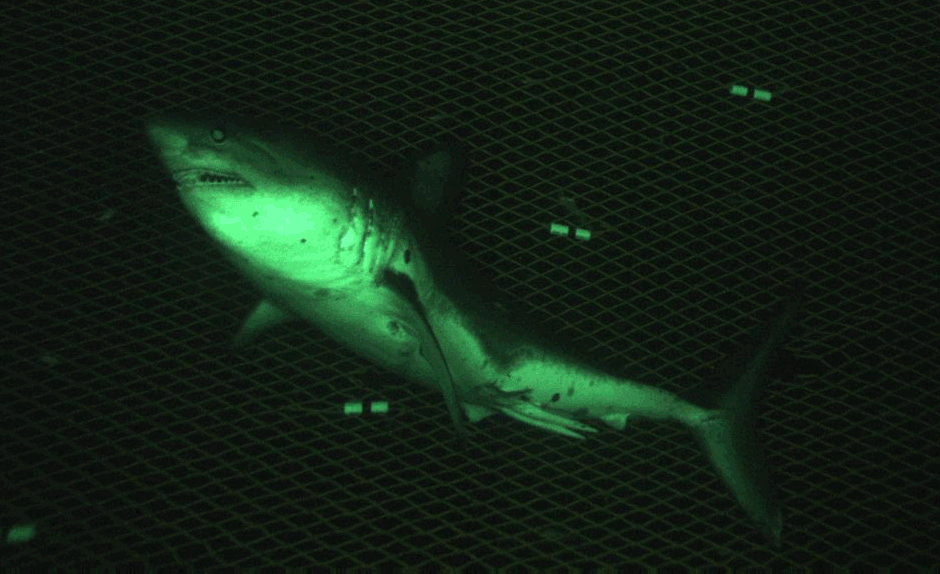
Salmon shark photographed in a NOAA Fisheries survey net off Alaska

North of the equator, in the northern Pacific Ocean, the salmon shark is relatively common in continental offshore waters, where it ranges from inshore to just off the coast. Tagging has revealed a range which includes sub-Arctic to subtropical waters. The species is believed to range as far south as the Sea of Japan and as far north as 65°N in Alaska, notably appearing en masse in Prince William Sound during the annual salmon run. Individuals have been observed diving as deep as 668 m (2,192 ft), but they are believed to spend most of their time in epipelagic waters. While salmon sharks primarily travel alone, or in feeding aggregations of several individuals, sometimes they may be seen in schools. According to a study in 2008, salmon sharks have been observed to use area restricted search behaviors in both southern and northern Pacific Ocean regions. Individuals that migrate through southern high productivity regions exhibit more of these behaviors than those who travel through low productivity regions. Salmon sharks travel fast during migratory patterns. Studies conducted on said migrations put the average speed of individual sharks at 33 km. Juvenile salmon sharks stick to more coastal regions along the west coast of North America. Juveniles prefer water temperatures between 12 and 16°C. Juveniles prey on a variety of mesopelagic (intermediate depth) and epipelagic (the upper layer of the water column where light penetrates for photosynthesis) offshore prey.

=== Regional differences ===
Age and sex composition differences have been observed between populations in the eastern and western North Pacific. Eastern populations are dominated by females, while the western populations are predominantly male. Whether these distinctions stem from genetically distinct stocks, or if the segregation occurs as part of their growth and development, is not known. The population differences may be a result of Japanese fishermen harvesting more of the male population; certain Japanese herbalists use salmon shark fins (of males, specifically) in some traditional soups and medicines said to treat various forms of cancer.

== Human interactions ==
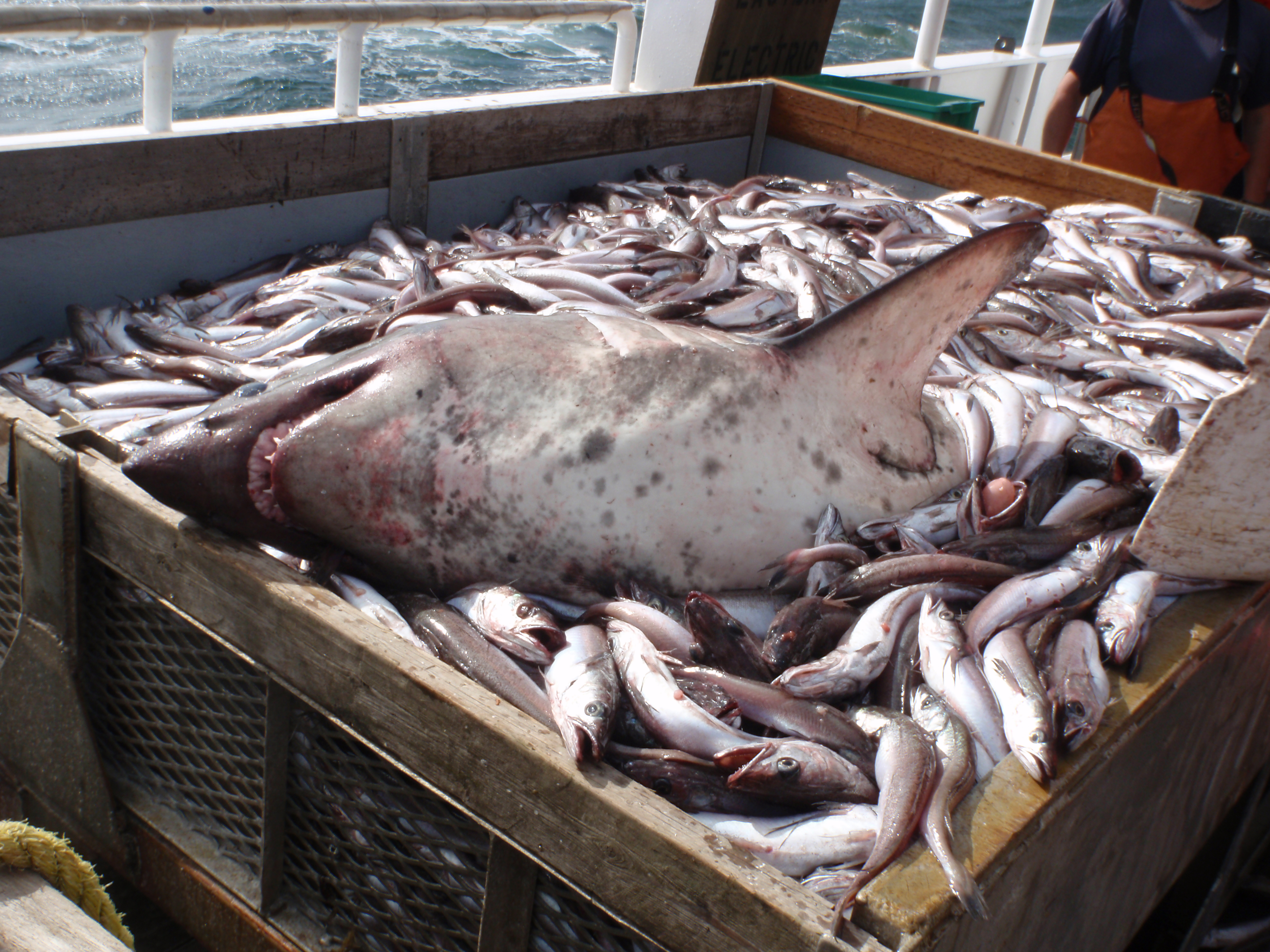
Salmon shark caught in a trawl

Currently, no commercial fishery for salmon shark exists, but they are occasionally caught as bycatch in commercial salmon gillnet fisheries, where they are usually discarded. Commercial fisheries regard salmon sharks as nuisances since they can damage fishing gear and consume portions of the commercial catch. Fishermen deliberately injuring salmon sharks have been reported.

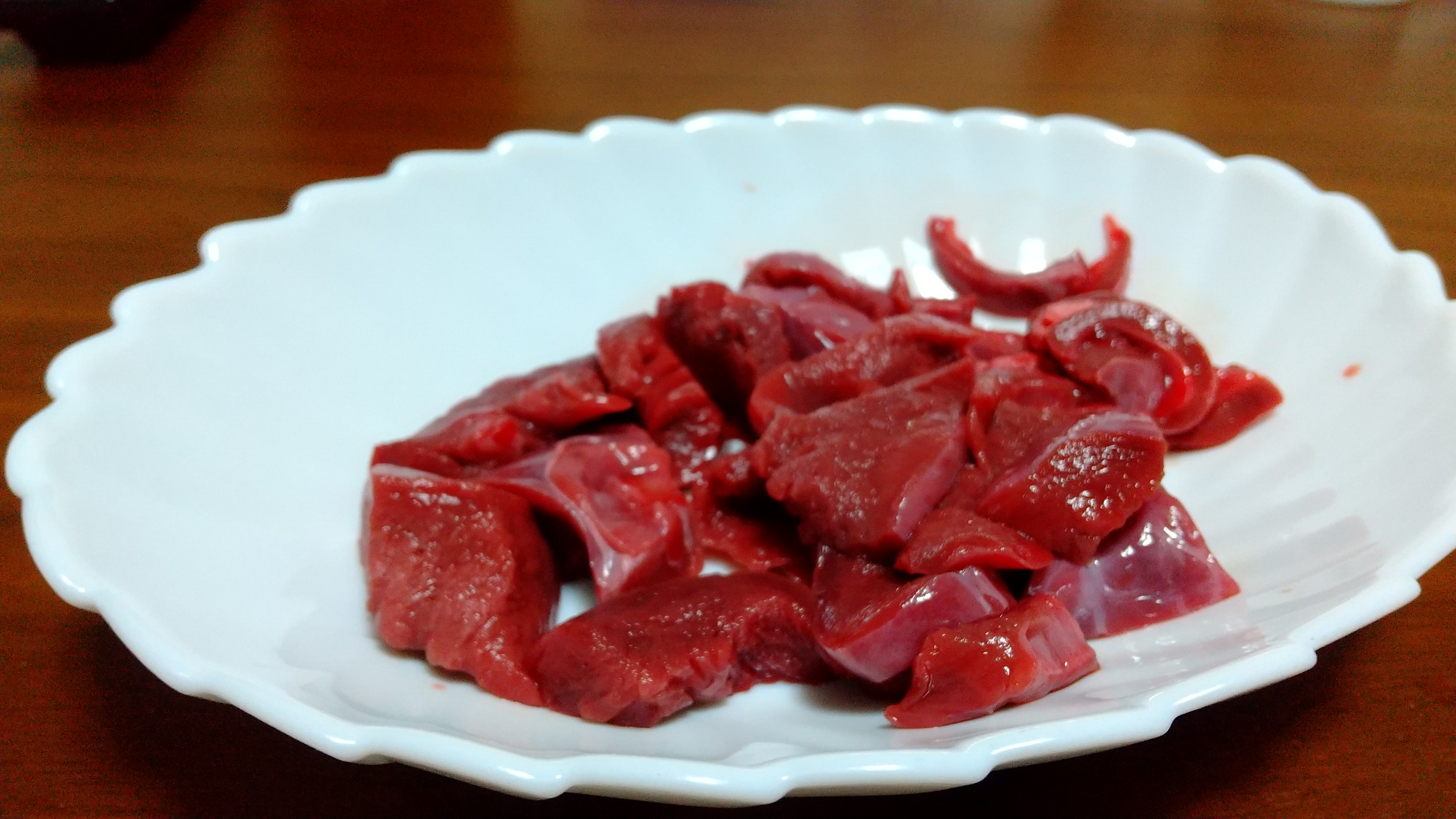
Sliced salmon shark heart, served as sashimi in Miyagi, Japan. The heart is known locally as mouka no hoshi, or "star of the salmon shark"

Sport fishermen fish for salmon sharks in Alaska. Alaskan fishing regulations limit the catch of salmon sharks to two per person per year. Sport fishermen are allowed one salmon shark per day from April 1 and ending the following March 31 in British Columbia.

The flesh of the fish is used for human consumption, and in the Japanese city of Kesennuma, Miyagi, the heart is considered a delicacy for use in sashimi.

Although salmon sharks are thought to be capable of injuring humans, few, if any, attacks on humans have been reported, but reports of divers encountering salmon sharks and salmon sharks bumping fishing vessels have been given. These reports, however, may need positive identification of the shark species involved. Salmon sharks have never been positively identified attacking humans and there is no confirmed evidence that salmon sharks have attacked humans.

Declines in the abundance of economically important Chinook salmon in the 2000s may be attributed to increased predation by salmon sharks, based on remote temperature readings from tagged salmon that indicate they have been swallowed by sharks.

== Conservation status ==
Similar to white sharks, salmon sharks have a slow growth and reproduction rate, making them susceptible to overfishing and overexploitation. They are considered least concern, however juvenile salmon sharks are extremely susceptible to temperature changes in coastal waters. This means that further ocean warming can severely impact the species. There are reports of declines in salmon shark populations from Alaskan fishermen.

== See also ==
- List of sharks
