= Tonosí =

- Town and corregimiento
- Location within Panama
- Coordinates: 7°24′0″N 80°26′24″W
- Country: Panama
- Province: Los Santos
- District: Tonosí

Area
  - Land: 83.6 km^{2} (32.3 sq mi)

Population (2010)
  - Total: 2,257
  - Density: 27/km^{2} (70/sq mi)
- Population density calculated based on land area.
- Time zone: UTC−5 (EST)
- Climate: Aw

Tonosí is a town and corregimiento in Tonosí District, Los Santos Province, Panama with a population of 2,257 as of 2010. It is the seat of Tonosí District. Its population as of 1990 was 1,910; its population as of 2000 was 2,282.

The town is served by Tonosí Airport.

== Climate ==
Climate data for Tonosí (2001–2012 normals, rainfall & extremes 1971–2013)
Month	Jan	Feb	Mar	Apr	May	Jun	Jul	Aug	Sep	Oct	Nov	Dec	Year
Record high °C (°F)	38.5 (101.3)	39.5 (103.1)	39.0 (102.2)	39.8 (103.6)	38.8 (101.8)	37.0 (98.6)	37.8 (100.0)	36.9 (98.4)	35.6 (96.1)	36.6 (97.9)	36.6 (97.9)	38.8 (101.8)	39.8 (103.6)
Mean daily maximum °C (°F)	34.9 (94.8)	35.8 (96.4)	36.2 (97.2)	35.6 (96.1)	33.3 (91.9)	31.7 (89.1)	31.5 (88.7)	31.5 (88.7)	31.4 (88.5)	31.2 (88.2)	31.4 (88.5)	33.3 (91.9)	33.2 (91.7)
Daily mean °C (°F)	29.0 (84.2)	29.6 (85.3)	30.1 (86.2)	29.9 (85.8)	28.7 (83.7)	27.7 (81.9)	27.6 (81.7)	27.4 (81.3)	27.3 (81.1)	27.2 (81.0)	27.4 (81.3)	28.2 (82.8)	28.3 (83.0)
Mean daily minimum °C (°F)	23.1 (73.6)	23.4 (74.1)	23.9 (75.0)	24.3 (75.7)	24.2 (75.6)	23.8 (74.8)	23.5 (74.3)	23.3 (73.9)	23.2 (73.8)	23.2 (73.8)	23.3 (73.9)	23.1 (73.6)	23.5 (74.3)
Record low °C (°F)	17.0 (62.6)	16.5 (61.7)	18.4 (65.1)	16.5 (61.7)	18.0 (64.4)	17.0 (62.6)	17.0 (62.6)	15.0 (59.0)	16.5 (61.7)	18.0 (64.4)	17.5 (63.5)	15.5 (59.9)	15.0 (59.0)
Average rainfall mm (inches)	7.8 (0.31)	3.6 (0.14)	2.2 (0.09)	39.2 (1.54)	171.3 (6.74)	190.8 (7.51)	171.4 (6.75)	204.3 (8.04)	202.8 (7.98)	293.2 (11.54)	237.1 (9.33)	85.6 (3.37)	1,609.3 (63.34)
Source 1: INEC
Source 2: IMHPA (rainfall & extremes)
