= Southerham Grey Pit =

Coordinates: 50.862°N 0.028°E

- Site of Special Scientific Interest
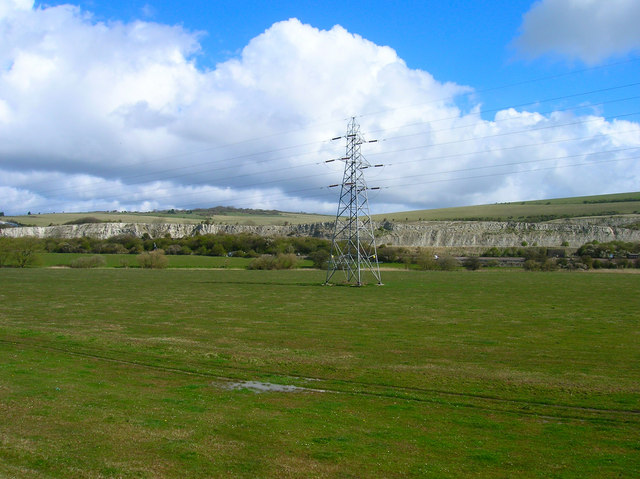
- Location of Southerham Grey Pit.
- Area of search: East Sussex
- Grid reference: TQ 428 089
- Interest: Geological
- Area: 8.5 hectares (21 acres)
- Notification date: 1990
- Location map: Magic Map

Southerham Grey Pit is a 8.5-hectare (21-acre) geological Site of Special Scientific Interest south-east of Lewes in East Sussex. It is a Geological Conservation Review site.

This site exposes rocks dating to the Cenomanian stage of the Late Cretaceous, around 100 million years ago. It has preserved many inoceramid bivalves which are not found elsewhere in Britain and are important for regional correlation. It is also the last remaining source for fossil fish in the area.
