= Petita Ayarza =

Panamanian politician

Member of the National Assembly
- Incumbent
- Assumed office July 1, 2019
- President: Laurentino Cortizo
- Preceded by: Aibán Velarde
- Constituency: Circuit 10-1 (Ailigandí, Madugandí, Narganá)

Personal details
- Born: Petita Ayarza Pérez; January 10, 1965 (age 61) Rio Sidra, Panama
- Party: Democratic Revolutionary
- Children: 5
- Education: University of Panama
- Occupation: Businesswoman, politician

Petita Ayarza Pérez (born January 10, 1965) is a Panamanian Indigenous political leader and businesswoman. In the 2019 general election, she became the first Guna woman to run for a seat as deputy and be elected to the National Assembly of Panama.

== Biography ==
Petita Ayarza was born in Rio Sidra in 1965. She was named after former first lady Petita Saa de Robles, the wife of President Marco Aurelio Robles.

She holds a licentiate in human resources and an ecological tourism technician degree, the latter from the University of Panama. She has worked as a businesswoman in the tourism sector in the Guna Yala region, and is the leader of a tourism association for 28 islands.

== Political career ==
Ayarza has been a member of the Democratic Revolutionary Party (PRD) for more than 20 years, during which she assumed leadership positions as party delegate, president of the organization area via election, and president of the party's regional collective. She was the first woman to hold these positions within her party in the Guna Yala region.

In her political speech, she advocates for the rights of Indigenous Peoples, and especially for the empowerment of women of the Guna ethnic group.

== 2019 Panamanian general election ==
Petita Ayarza was the first Guna woman to be presented by the PRD as a candidate for a legislative position for Circuit 10–1, which includes the districts of Ailigandí, Madugandí, and Narganá. She won a seat in the 2019 general election, receiving 38.77% of the votes, according to Electoral Court data.
