= Carti (disambiguation) =

Carti or Cartí may refer to:

- Playboi Carti (born 1995 or 1996), American rapper
- Cartí Sugtupu, one of the Cartí islands off the coast of Panama
- Cartí Airport, airport on Panamanian mainland serving the Cartí islands
- Nuevo Cartí, a town built with Panamanian government and Inter-American Development Bank funding to house the population of Cartí Sugtupu

== See also ==
- Carty, surname
