= Ayarza =

Ayarza is a surname of Basque origin, meaning "sloped valley".

== People with the name ==
- Rosa Mercedes Ayarza de Morales (1881–1969), Peruvian composer
- Petita Ayarza (born 1965), Panamanian politician and businesswoman
- Josimar Ayarza (born 1987), Panamanian basketball player
- Abdiel Ayarza (born 1992), Panamanian footballer

== See also ==
- Laguna de Ayarza, a crater lake in Guatemala
