= Corazón de Jesús Airport =

Airstrip in Panama

- IATA: CZJ; ICAO: none

Summary
- Airport type: Public
- Serves: Corazón de Jesús, Narganá
- Elevation AMSL: 8 ft / 2 m
- Coordinates: 9°26′50″N 78°34′30″W

Map
- Location of the airport in Panama

Runways
Direction	Length		Surface
Direction	m	ft	Surface
09/27	560	1,837	Asphalt
- Source: Google Maps GCM

Corazón de Jesús Airport (IATA: CZJ) is an airstrip serving Corazón de Jesús and Narganá, island towns in the Guna Yala comarca (indigenous province) of Panama.

The airstrip is on an island 0.5 kilometres (0.3 mi) east of Corazón de Jesús island, and is reached by ferry. Approach and departure to either runway end are over the water.

The Tocumen VOR-DME (Ident: TUM) is located 53.6 nautical miles (99 km) west-southwest of the airstrip.

== See also ==
- Transport in Panama
- List of airports in Panama
