= Assudub =

Achutupo Assudub
- Location within Panama
- Coordinates: 9°11′55″N 77°59′10″W
- Country: Panama
- Province: Kuna Yala
- Municipality: Ailigandi

Population (2008)
  - Total: 1,586

Achutupo is an island town in the San Blas archipelago of Panama, located .7 kilometres (0.4 mi) off the Kuna Yala comarca (district) coast. The island is sometimes called Isla Perro or Dog Island. It has a total area of around 0.1 km^{2}, with a population density of around 15,860 people per km^{2}, resulting in Achutupo being one of the most densely populated islands in the world.

Air Panama serves the town from the Achutupo Airport, which is on the mainland southwest of the island and is reached by boat.
