= Port Obaldía =

Puerto Obaldia is the main town of corregimiento Puerto Obaldía, one of four administrative subdivisions of Kuna Yala indigenous region of Panama, located on the border with Colombia.

Puerto Obaldia is the location of "the main national police station in the region and the airport serving the border communities of Kuna Yala and an Office of Migration Department of the Ministry of Government and Justice and a consular office in Colombia. the condition of coastal border port business guarantees from both the Colombian and Panamanian side. Apart from trade, the inhabitants of Puerto Obaldia engaged in fishing and agriculture." There are no ATMs and no cell phone coverage.

== Accessibility ==
Boats are available for Capurganá, Colombia, from U.S. $10. From Puerto Obaldia Airport, there are flights every two-three days to Panama City, the booking office is closed though. Also a boat to Cartí for $100, at least in the low season very sporadically though as there's only one boat whose owner is not customer-minded.
