= Achutupo Airport =

- IATA: ACU; ICAO: none

Summary
- Serves: Achutupo, Panama
- Location: Guna Yala Comarca
- Elevation AMSL: 16 ft / 5 m
- Coordinates: 9°11′25″N 77°59′40″W

Map
- Location of the airport in Panama

Runways
Direction	Length		Surface
Direction	m	ft	Surface
17/35	650	2,133	Concrete
- Source: Google Maps

Achutupo Airport (IATA: ACU) is an airport serving the island town of Achutupo, in the San Blas archipelago of Panama. The runway is located on the mainland, 0.7 kilometres (0.4 mi) southwest of the island and is reached by boat.

There is rising terrain south of the runway. North approach and departure are over the water.

The La Palma VOR (Ident: PML) is located 47.5 nautical miles (88 km) south of the airport.

== Technical information ==
The airport has a concrete runway measuring 650 meters in length.

The runway is surrounded by thick vegetation. To the south of the runway the terrain is sloping. Takeoffs and approaches to the airfield from the north are over the water of the Caribbean Sea.

The La Palma VOR (Ident: PML) is located 88 kilometers south of the airport.

== See also ==
- Transport in Panama
- List of airports in Panama
