= Playón Chico Airport =

Playón Chico(Uggubseni) Airport
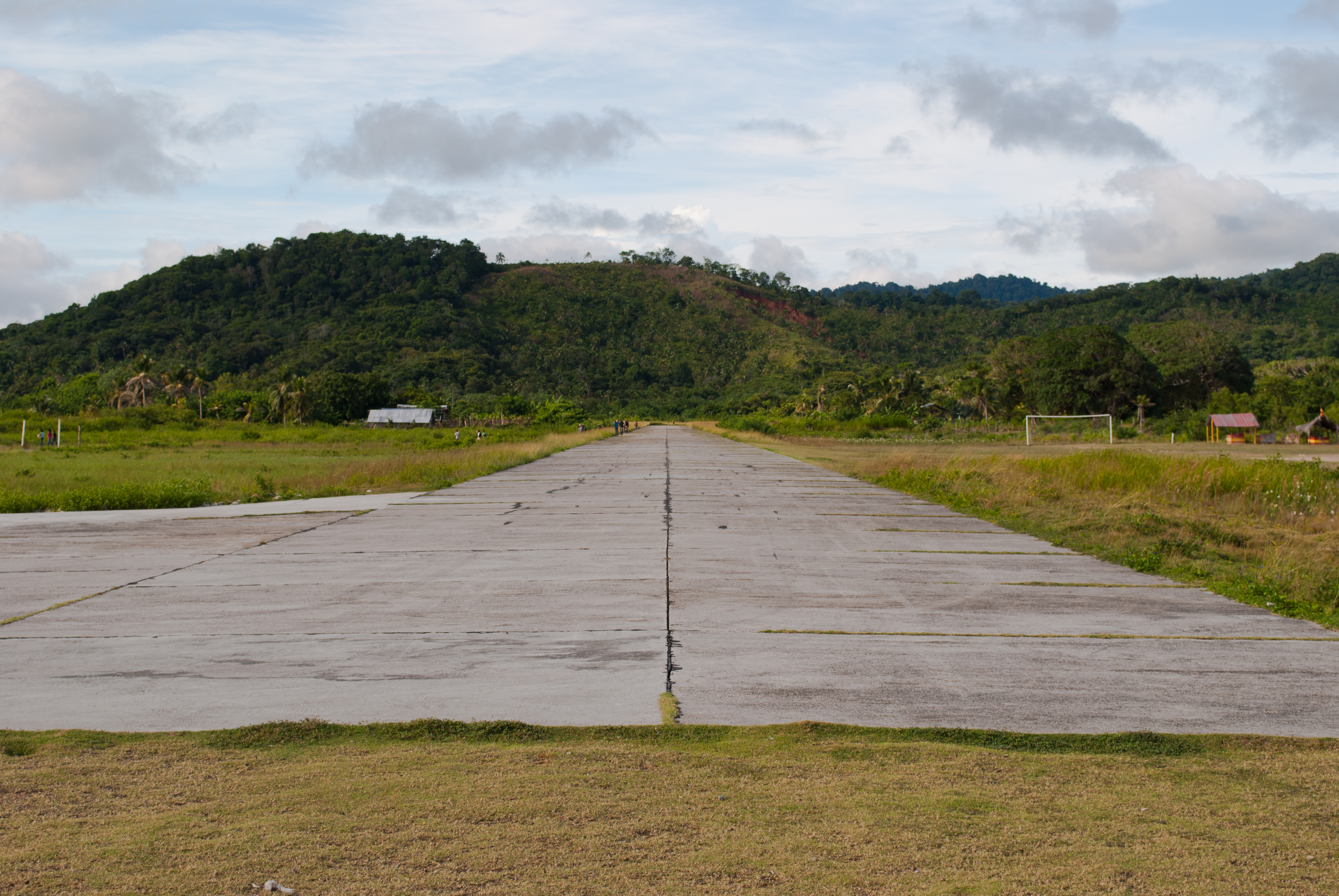
- IATA: PYC; ICAO: none

Summary
- Airport type: Public
- Serves: Uggubseni, Guna Yala, Panama
- Elevation AMSL: 18 ft / 5 m
- Coordinates: 9°18′35″N 78°14′05″W

Map
- Location in Panama

Runways
Direction	Length		Surface
Direction	m	ft	Surface
03/21	740	2,428	Concrete
- Sources: GCM Bing Maps

Playón Chico Airport (IATA: PYC) is an airport serving Ukupseni, an island in the San Blas Archipelago in the Guna Yala comarca (indigenous province) of Panama.

The airport is on the mainland, connected to the island by a bridge. North approach and departure are over the water. There is rising terrain 1 kilometre (0.6 mi) south of the runway.

The La Palma VOR is located 54.0 nautical miles (100 km) south of the airport.

== See also ==
- Transport in Panama
- List of airports in Panama
