= Moraggedub =

Mormaquetupu
Moraggedub
- Location within Panama

Geography
- Coordinates: 9°27′12″N 78°51′12″W
- Archipelago: San Blas Islands
- Adjacent to: Caribbean Sea
- Area: 0.012 km^{2} (0.0046 sq mi)

Administration
- Panama
- Indigenous Region: Guna Yala
- Municipality: Narganá

Demographics
- Population: 433 (2010)
- Pop. density: 36,083/km^{2} (93455/sq mi)
- Ethnic groups: Guna

Mormagedup, Moraggedub or Mormaketupu (Spanish: Mormaquetupu), also called Isla Máquina or Isla Maquina, is a densely populated island in the San Blas Archipelago, a group of islands off the coast of northeast Panama specifically in the Guna Yala Region. The island is part of the municipality or corregimiento of Narganá.

== Etymology ==
Its island's name translates to Mola-making island, since its residents are known for creating hand-made textiles that is the traditional clothing of the native Guna people.

== Demographics ==
According to the census conducted in 2010, the island has a population of 433. There are 56 houses in Mormaquetupu and the average number of people living per house is 7.73. With a very small land area, this makes the island one of the most densely populated islands in the world.

== See also ==
- List of islands by population density
