= Ogobsucum Airport =

Ustupu-Ogobsucum Airport
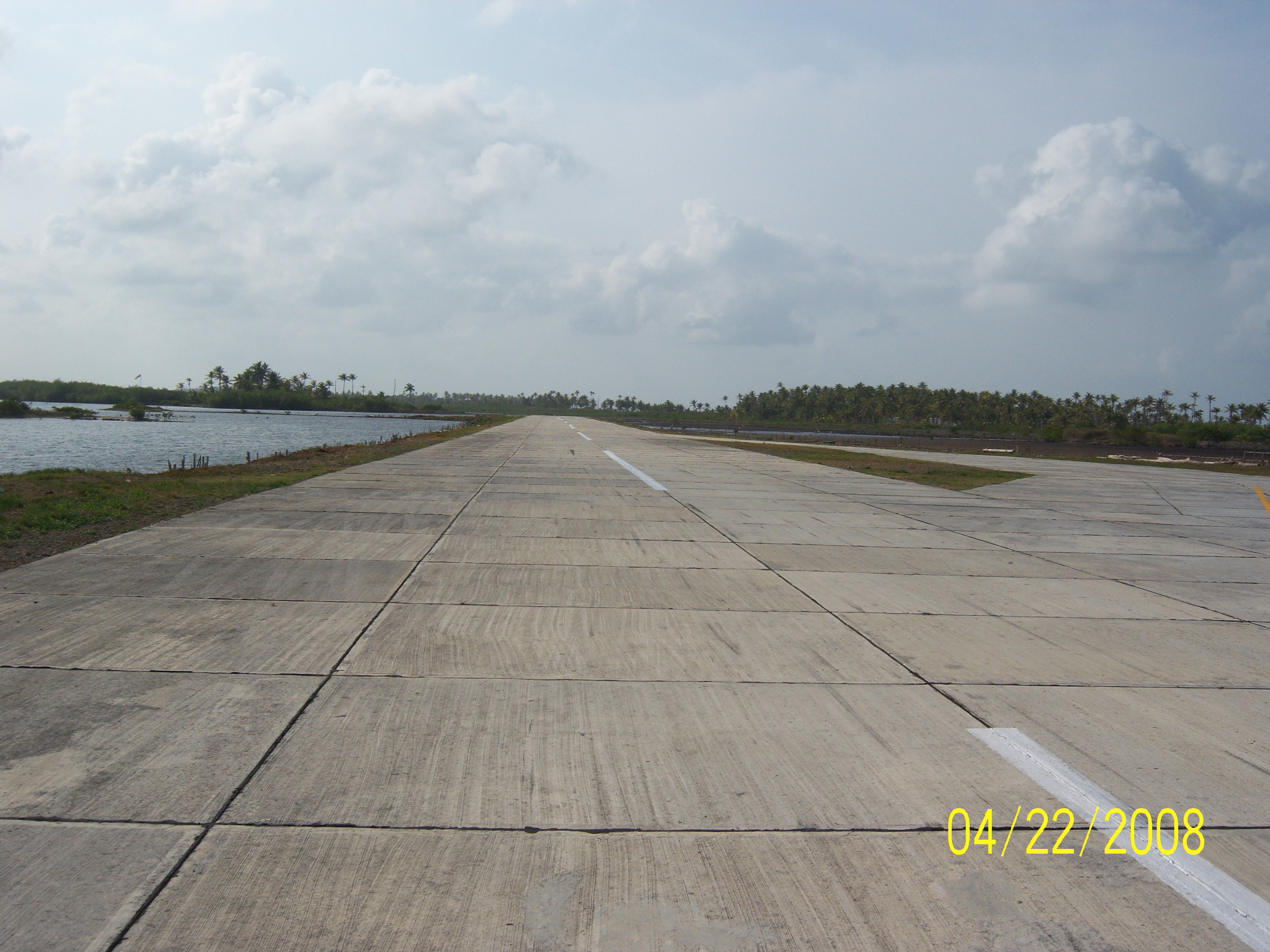
- Runway of Ustupu-Ogobsucum Airport
- IATA: OGM; ICAO: MPOG

Summary
- Airport type: Public
- Operator: State government
- Serves: Ustupo, Panama
- Elevation AMSL: 13 ft (4.0 m)
- Coordinates: 9°08′15″N 77°56′00″W

Map
- Location of the airport in Panama

Runways
Direction	Length		Surface
Direction	m	ft	Surface
15/33	500	1,640	concrete
- Source: Google Maps GCM

Ustupu-Ogobsucum Airport (IATA: OGM) is an airport serving the island town of Ustupo in the Guna Yala comarca (indigenous province) of Panama. It handles domestic flights and general aviation.

The runway bridges two of the several islands comprised by the town. It is 1 kilometre (0.6 mi) northwest of the main populated islands. Approach and departure at either end of the runway will be over the water.

The La Palma VOR (Ident: PML) is located 45.4 nautical miles (84 km) south-southwest of the airport.

The Ustupo Airport is on the mainland, 1 kilometre (0.6 mi) south of Ogobsucum Airport, and is no longer used for airline service.

== Incidents and accidents ==
- On 28 January 2007, a Cessna 182 operating a cargo flight was destroyed after it crashed into trees during take-off from the airport.

== See also ==
- Transport in Panama
- List of airports in Panama
