= Sapibenega =

Island in Panama

Coordinates: 9.319109°N 78.245157°W

Sapibenega is a privately owned island in Guna Yala, Panama, located near Uggubseni. It is 2.5 acre-wide. As of 2012, it is the world's eighth most expensive island.
