= Ustupo Airport =

- IATA: UTU; ICAO: MPUP

Summary
- Airport type: Public
- Serves: Ustupo, Panama
- Elevation AMSL: 9 ft (2.7 m)
- Coordinates: 9°07′41″N 77°56′01″W

Map
- Location of the airport in Panama

Runways
Direction	Length		Surface
Direction	m	ft	Surface
16/34	450	1,476	Concrete
- Source: Google Maps, OurAirports

Ustupo Airport (IATA: UTU, ICAO: MPUP) is a secondary airport serving the island town of Ustupo, Guna Yala comarca, Panama. It is 800 metres (0.5 mi) southwest on the mainland and reachable from the town by a boat.

There are no regular flights from the airport. Air Panama flies to nearby Ogobsucum Airport.

The La Palma VOR (Ident: PML) is located 45.0 nautical miles (83 km) south-southwest of the airport.

== See also ==
- Transport in Panama
- List of airports in Panama
