= Cayos Limones =

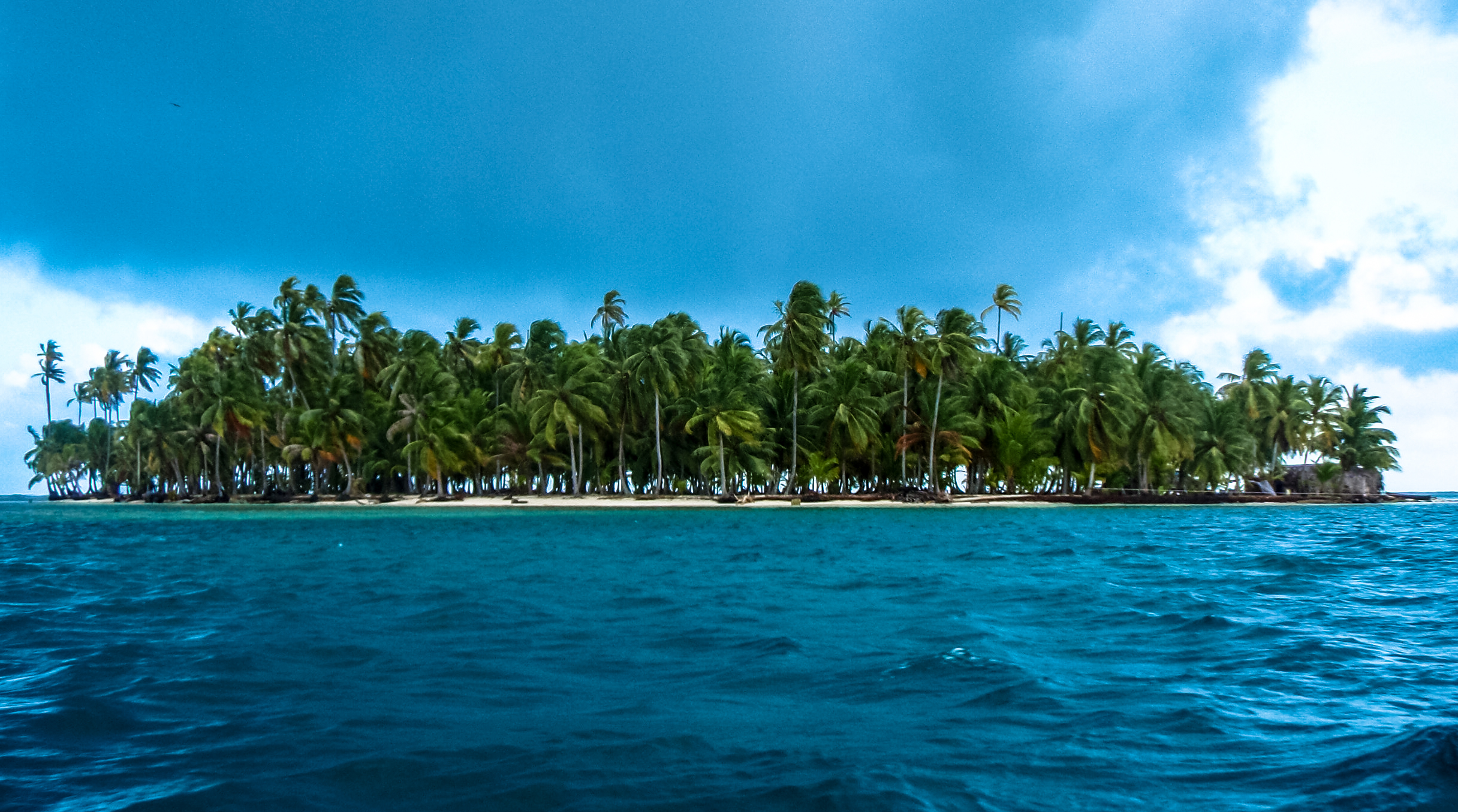

- Cayos Limones
- Coordinates: 9°33′09″N 78°53′14″W
- Country: Panama

The Cayos Limones or Lemon Keys are a group of Caribbean islands in the San Blas Archipelago in Guna Yala province of Panama. As part of the autonomous Guna Yala indigenous territory it is mainly populated by the Guna indigenous People. The islands in Cayos Limones are sparsely populated. The most notable of the islands are Isla de Perro and Chichimen, both are situated near substantial reefs making them ideal for snorkeling, as they contain several sunken ships. The economy is mainly based on tourism, fishing and coconut harvesting. The Keys are connected to the other islands of the archipelago and to the mainland by taxi-boat, normally through the other islands of El Porvenir or Carti Sugtupu.

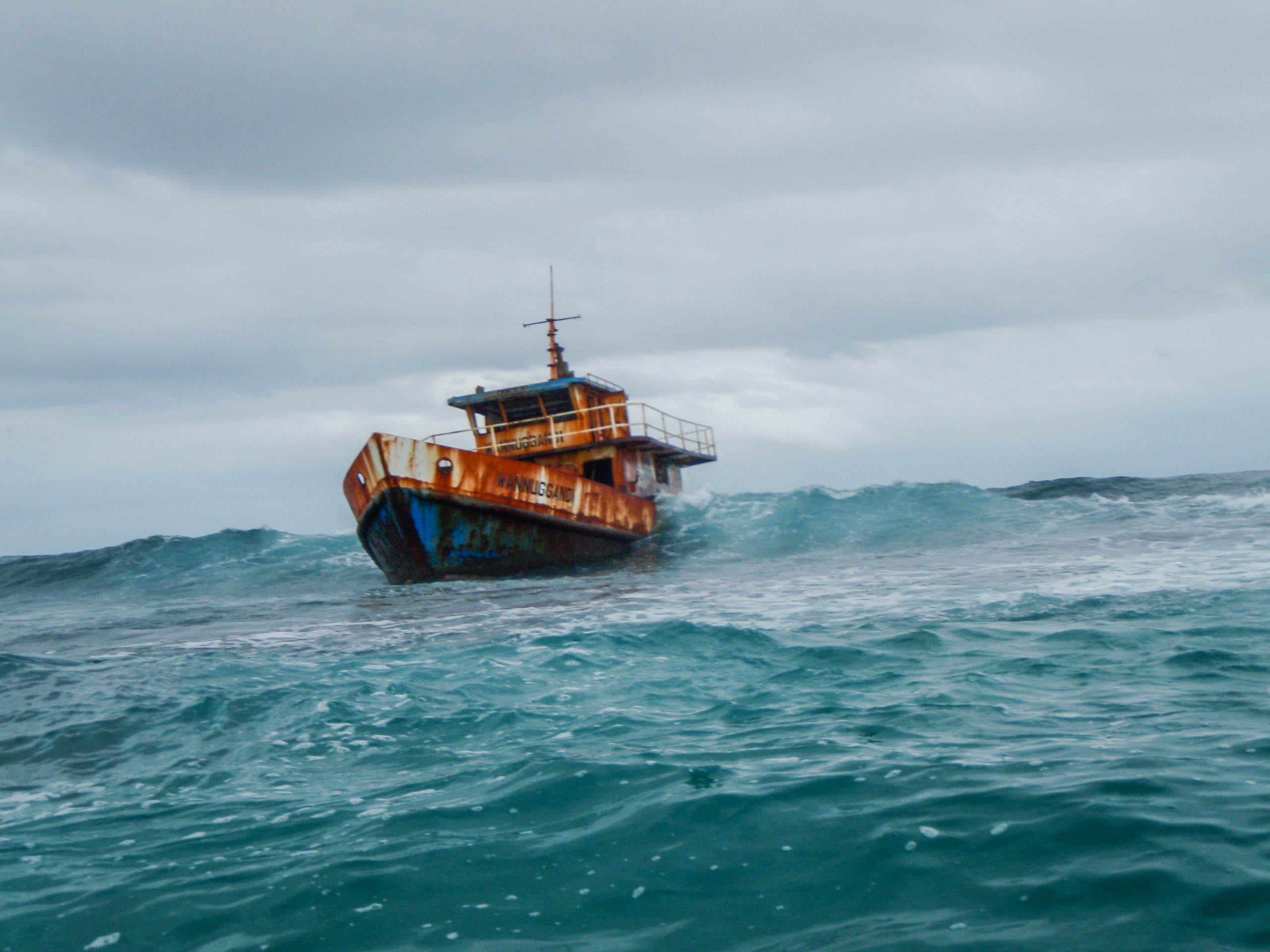
Shipwreck near Chichimen Island, Cuyos Limones, Guna Yala, Panama.
