= Cartí Airport =

- IATA: CTE; ICAO: none

Summary
- Serves: Cartí
- Location: Guna Yala Province
- Elevation AMSL: 17 ft / 5 m
- Coordinates: 9°27′10″N 78°58′45″W

Map
- Location of the airport in Panama

Runways
Direction	Length		Surface
Direction	m	ft	Surface
02/20	495	1,624	Concrete
- Source: HERE Maps GCM

Cartí Airport (IATA: CTE) was an airport serving the Cartí islands in the San Blas Archipelago of Panama. The airport is on the mainland, approximately 2.7 kilometres (1.7 mi) southwest of Cartí Sugtupu island.

The Tocumen VOR-DME (Ident: TUM) is located 34.6 nautical miles (64 km) south-southeast of the airport.
