= Ukupseni =

Island in Guna Yala, Panama

Ukupseni Uggubseni, Playón Chico
- Interactive map of Ukupseni
- Location in Panama
- Coordinates: 9°18′41″N 78°13′58″W
- Country: Panama
- Comarca indígena: Guna Yala

Area
  - Total: 0.06 km^{2} (0.023 sq mi)

Population
  - Total: 1,849
  - Density: 31,000/km^{2} (80,000/sq mi)
- Time zone: UTC−5 (ETZ)

Ukupseni, officially spelled Uggubseni and also known as Playón Chico, is one of the most populous islands in the Guna Yala territory of Panama, 100 metres (330 ft) from the mainland. The literal translation for Ukupseni is 'little beach' in English, or playa chica in Spanish, thus Playón Chico is a mistranslation, which means roughly 'Little Big Beach'.

Ukupseni is a small island, roughly 0.06 km^{2}. The population of the island is 1,849, which gives Ukupseni a population density of around 31,000 people per km^{2}, resulting in Ukupseni being one of the most densely populated islands.

== Housing ==
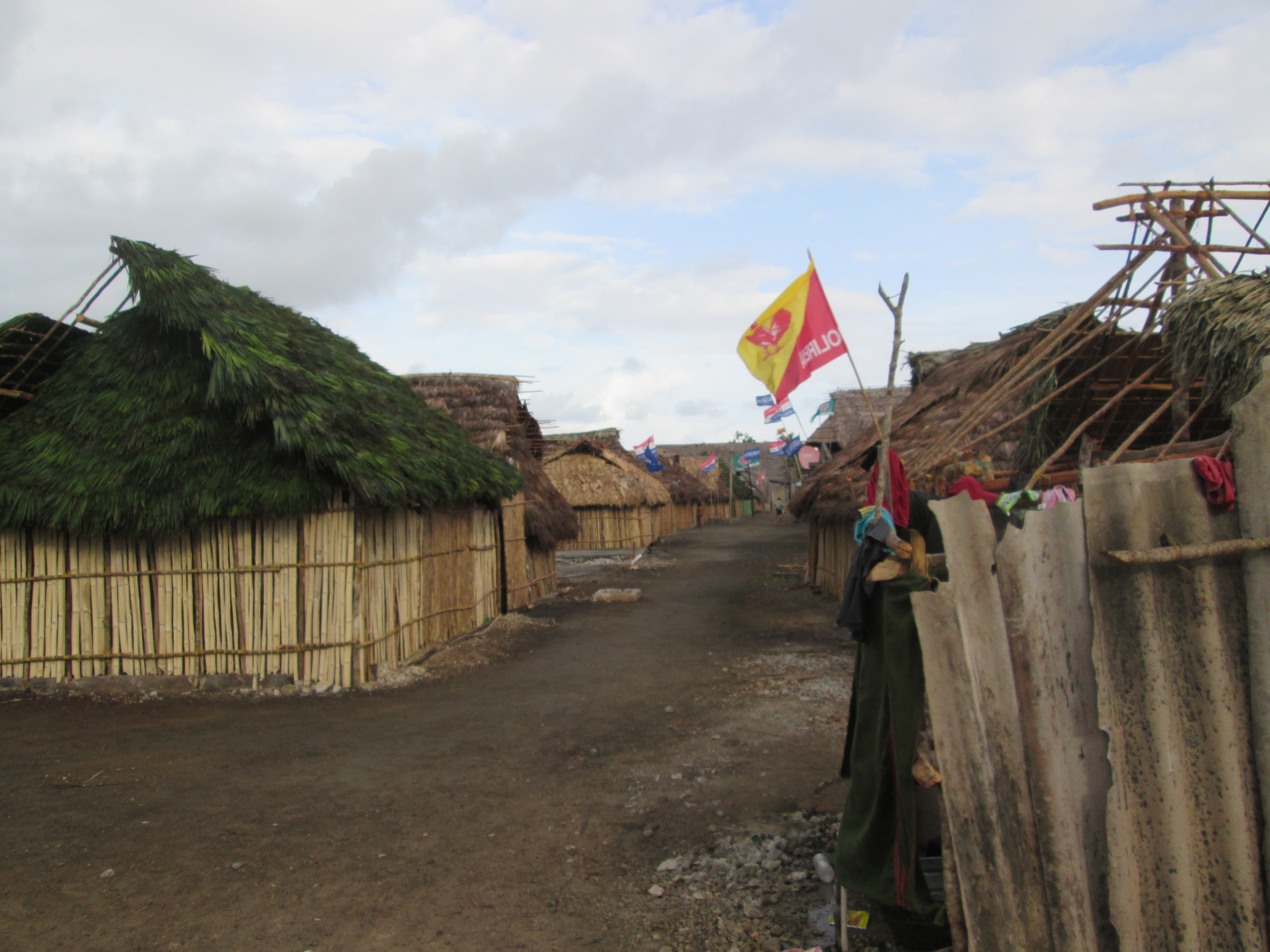
Thatched houses on Playón Chico

Ukupseni is populated by Guna. The typical housing structure is a "pole"-style thatch hut, which will house an entire family. Building materials are tree trunks for the main pillars, bamboo poles for support, and various types of leaves for the roof. Walls are typically lashed bamboo or caña blanca (cane). A well-constructed hut can stand for as long as 30 years.

The elderly will often be cared for by their children, and so one family dwelling will often house several generations.

== Transportation ==
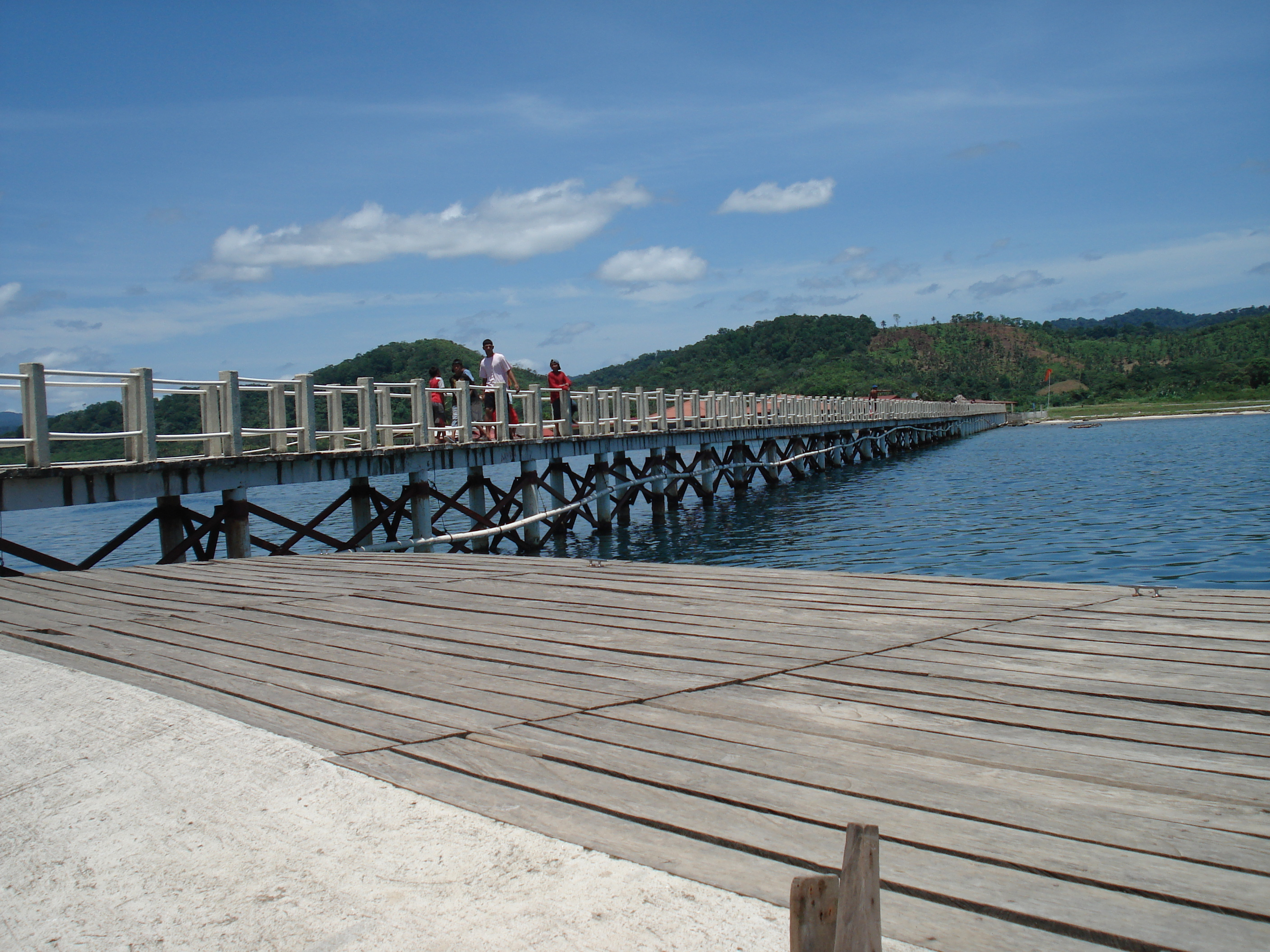
The bridge connecting Ukupseni to the mainland

Ukupseni lays approximately 100 metres (330 ft) from the Panama mainland. Playón Chico Airport (IATA: PYC) is located on the mainland adjacent to the island. Ukupseni is only reachable by plane, boat, or by foot.

There is no road to Ukupseni. There is now a bridge connecting Ukupseni to the mainland. This is extremely useful, as the majority of local agriculture, schooling, the airport, and potable water are on the mainland.

Aside from the bridge, the second most popular form of transportation is the cayuco (hollowed-out tree canoe). Cayucos range in sizes and styles. Extremely large cayucos, some more than 4 ft wide are used, and others vary in size down to one-person boats.

A typical cayuco is similar to a Western-style canoe. Even though cayukos travel in the ocean, they do not have a lateral brace and balance as found on Polynesian ocean-going craft. A distinct, low-profile cayuco is used for navigating rivers.

== Economy ==
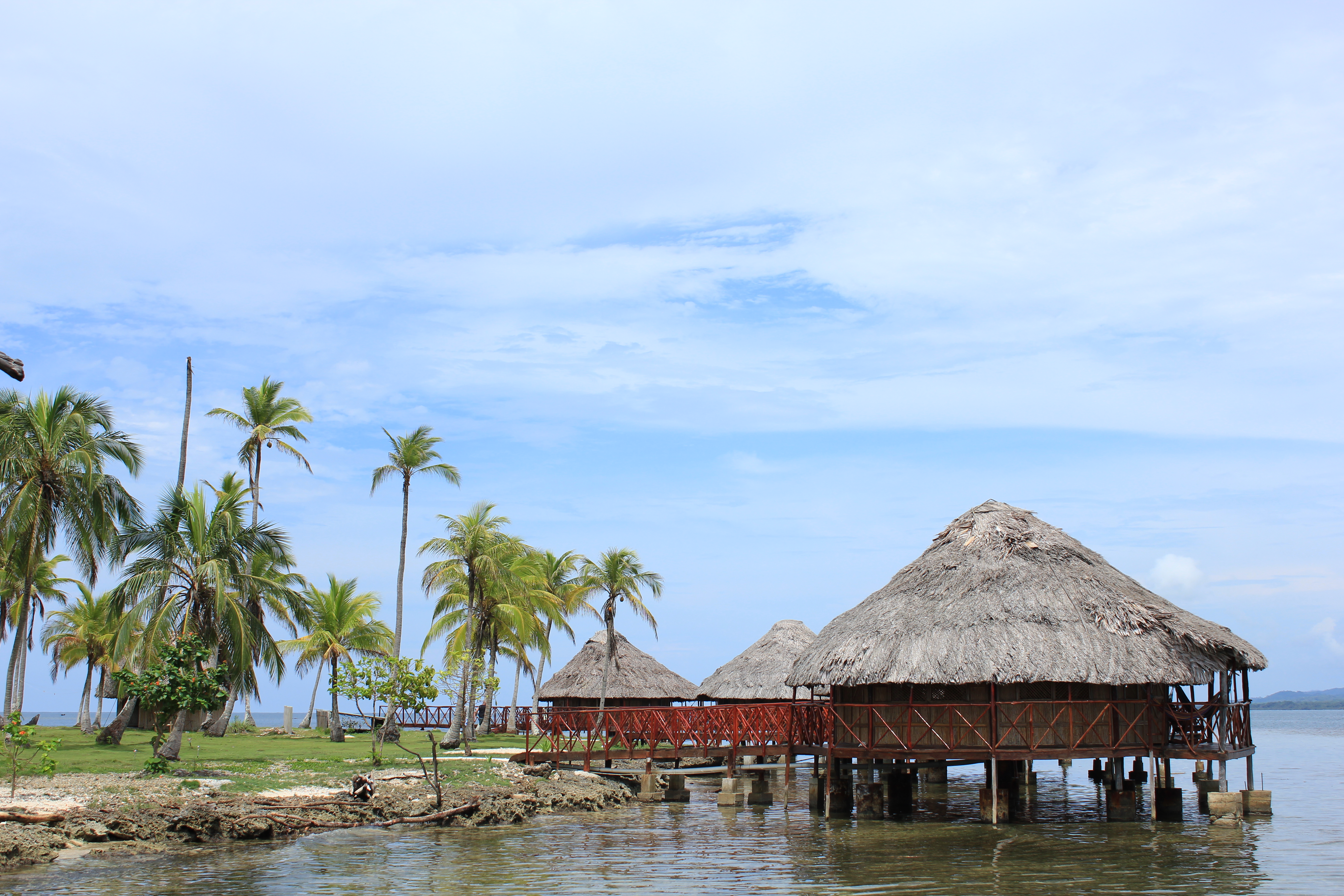
Cabins of Yandup Island Lodge

Ukupseni is mostly autonomous, in that it grows most of its own food. Colombian ships travel through Guna Yala, and Guna sell coconuts in exchange for goods, including hammocks and other supplies. Lobster, crab, and fish are sold to seafood airplanes on the Ukupseni airstrip.

Community projects are conducted by the local government for various needs throughout the year, and every citizen is required to help.

There are two lodges in private islands nearby, Yandup island (1000 meters northeast) and Iskardup (Sapibenega) island. Both are owned and run by Guna people from Ukupseni, as it is part of the Guna law that only Guna can own businesses in Guna Yala. These lodges also provide jobs as guides, cooks, handymen, maids and other works to Ukupseni's inhabitants, plus a larger income for fishermen and handicraft sellers, being the Mola the most famous handicraft of the Guna.

== Geography ==
Ukupseni, along with the vast majority of the rest of the San Blas Islands lies atop a coral reef that has broken the surface of the ocean. This island is enlarged constantly by people depositing earth, rock, waste, or other debris in order to create a large living area on the island. The elevation of these islands is about 1 1/2 feet above sea level.

Local tides in the area fluctuate the level of the water by 4–11 inches. Occasionally a "super-high tide" of about 18 inches will saturate the outer parts of the island.

There are several reef islands in close proximity to Ukupseni. Most are not inhabited, but some have tourist hotels on them. The closest populated island is San Ignacio de Tupile, a few miles due east. The mainland communities of Irgandi and Ukupa lie to the northwest.
