= Tupile =

Tupile may refer to:

Places:

- Tupile (town), a town in Panama
- Tupile Island, one of the Caribbean islands of Panama
- Tupile Airport, an Air Panama destination

Fiction:

- Tupile (Dune), a fictional planet in the Dune universe created by Frank Herbert
