= Ailigandí Airport =

- IATA: AIL; ICAO: MPAI

Summary
- Airport type: Public
- Serves: Ailigandí, Panama
- Elevation AMSL: 55 ft / 17 m
- Coordinates: 9°13′20″N 78°01′25″W

Map
- Location of the airport in Panama

Runways
| Direction | Length | | Surface |
| Direction | m | ft | Surface |
|---|---|---|---|
| 13/31 | 400 | 1,312 | Concrete |
- Source: Google Maps GCM

Ailigandí Airport (IATA: AIL, ICAO: MPAI) is an airstrip serving Ailigandí, an island town in the Guna Yala comarca (indigenous province) of Panama. The airstrip is onshore, approximately 400 metres (1,312 ft) southeast of Ailigandí island and is reached by boat. There are no roads near the airstrip.

The La Palma VOR (Ident: PML) is 49.4 nautical miles (91 km) south of the airstrip.

== See also ==
- Transport in Panama
- List of airports in Panama
