= Urgandi =

Island town in the San Blas Archipelago

Rio Sidra
Urgandi
- Location within Panama

Geography
- Coordinates: 9°27′7″N 78°49′57″W
- Archipelago: San Blas Islands
- Adjacent to: Caribbean Sea
- Area: 0.03 km^{2} (0.012 sq mi)

Administration
- Panama
- Indigenous Region: Guna Yala
- Municipality: Narganá

Demographics
- Population: 856 (2010)
- Pop. density: 28,533/km^{2} (73900/sq mi)
- Ethnic groups: Guna

Rio Sidra is a densely populated island town in the San Blas Archipelago of the Kuna Yala comarca (indigenous province) of Panama. Among the native Guna population, the island is called, Urgandi. The island is 1 kilometre (0.6 mi) off Panama's north coast. Rio Sidra is a municipality or corregimiento of Narganá.

In the 2010 census by National Institute of Statistics and Census of Panama, the estimated population of Rio Sidra is 856 and the number of households is 129.

== See also ==
- List of islands by population density
