= Mammidub =

Mammidub Mamitupo, Mamitupu
- Location within Panama
- Coordinates: 9°11′25″N 77°58′25″W
- Country: Panama
- Province: Guna Yala

Population (2008)
  - Total: 1,417

Mammidub is a town in the indigenous province of Guna Yala in Panama. It is on an island 400 metres (1,312 ft) off the coast.

== Sources ==
- World Gazetteer: Panama
