= Sasardi =

- Location within Panama
- Coordinates: 8°58′12″N 77°45′0″W
- Country: Panama
- Province: Kuna Yala

Population (2008)
  - Total: 1 167

Sasardi is a town in the Kuna Yala province of Panama.

== Sources ==
- World Gazetteer: Panama – World-Gazetteer.com
