= Gannirdub =

Kanir-Dup
- Location within Panama
- Coordinates: 9°16′48″N 78°9′0″W
- Country: Panama
- Province: Kuna Yala
- Municipality: Ailigandi

Population (2008)
  - Total: 1 593

Kanir-Dup is a town in the Kuna Yala province of Panama. It is located in an island off of its northeast coast. The town is often times called San Ignacio de Tupile or Isla Gallina. It is part of the municipality or corregimiento of Ailigandi

== Sources ==
- World Gazeteer: Panama – World-Gazetteer.com
