= Aggwanusadub =

Island in Guna Yala territory, Panama

Coordinates: 9°27′N 78°35′W

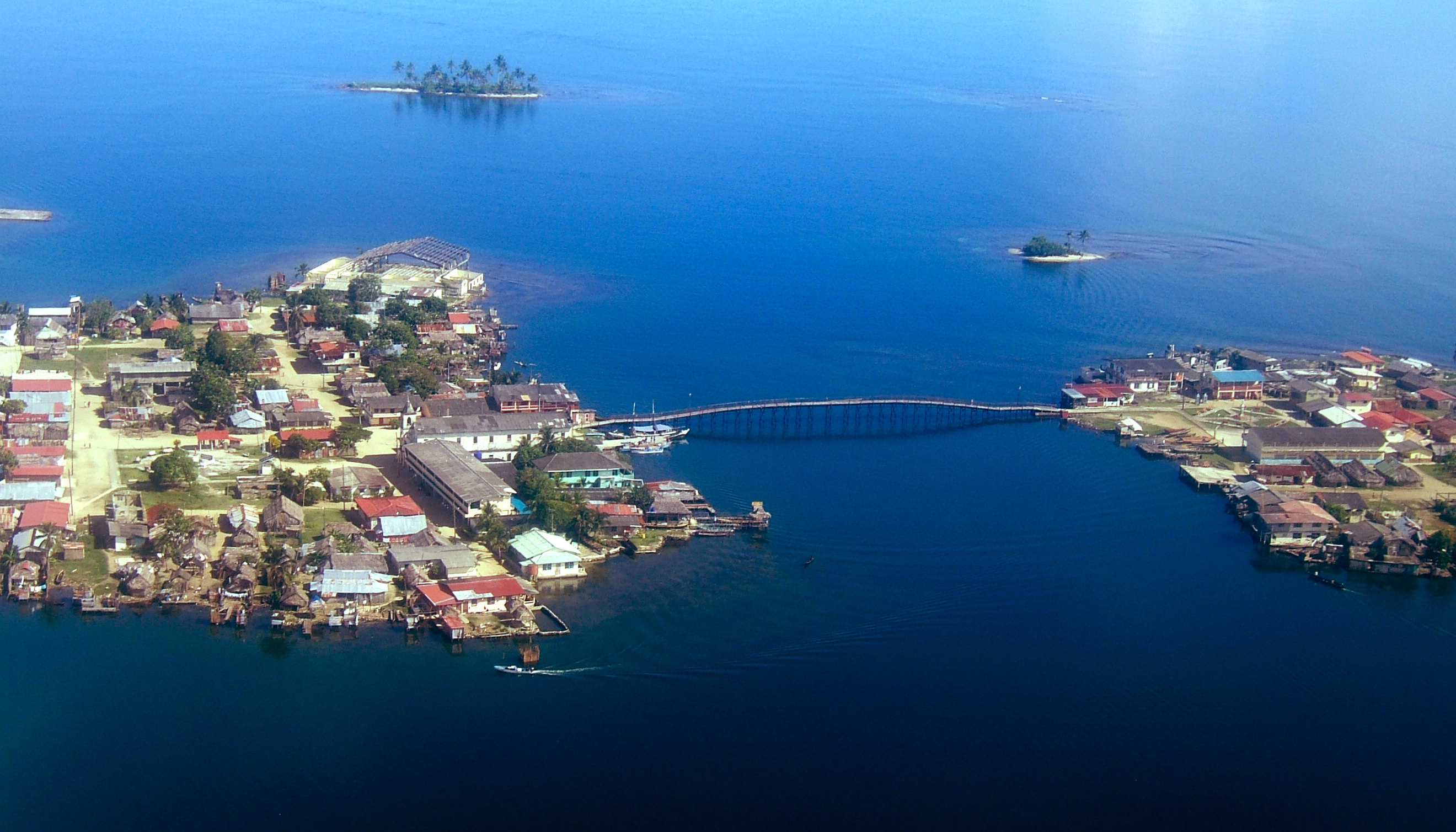
Corazón de Jesús on the right, Narganá on the left

Aggwanusadub (from the Guna language, also Akuanusadup; Spanish: Isla Corazón de Jesús) is an island in Guna Yala territory, Panama, with an area of 1.5 hectares and a population of 600. It is connected to larger Narganá due west of it by a concrete bridge, and completely overbuilt. Both islands are among the most westernized of the San Blas Islands.
