= Isber Yala =

Isber Yala Nuevo Cartí
- Location within Guna Yala Location within Panama
- Coordinates: 9.442°N 78.984°W
- Country: Panama
- Comarca indígena: Guna Yala
- Established: 2024

Government
  - Sayla: Tito López

Population (2025)
  - Total: 1,000
- Time zone: UTC-5

Isber Yala, or Nuevo Cartí, is a town in the Panamanian comarca indígena (indigenous territory) of Guna Yala, close to the coast and Cartí Airport.

It was built with funding from the Panamanian government and Inter-American Development Bank to house the population of the island of Gardi Sugdub, which had been increasingly suffering from overpopulation; most of the population of Gardi Sugdub moved to Isberyala in 2024.

== Etymology ==
The Guna name Isber Yala means "land of the loquats". The village's official Spanish name is "Nuevo Cartí" (New Carti).

== History ==
Gardi Sugdub had been experiencing overpopulation since the early 2000s, forcing the island's sports pitch to be built on thanks to the lack of available land. The idea of relocating some of the population of Gardi Sugdub to a new settlement on the mainland was first raised by Guna elders in 2008. By 2010, there were 30 families on the island, or around 150 people, interested in relocation, and an area of land on the mainland was cleared to make room for a new settlement. In 2011, the number of families interested in relocation had increased to 65, who formed the La Barriada Committee and entered talks with the Panamanian government's Ministry of Housing and Territorial Planning; they abandoned plans to use traditional construction methods in favour of standard modern construction practices for cost reasons.

The Panamanian government approved construction in 2015, but it was on hold for years thanks to the lack of funding for the construction of housing and completion of public amenities. It was completed in 2024 and 300 families made the move in June 2024. Although nearby, the new settlement is forested rather than having the same relationship with the sea. Residents described the move with sadness as a major lifestyle change that leaves behind more than 200 years of culture.
