= Puerto Obaldía Airport =

Puerto Obaldia Airport
- IATA: PUE; ICAO: MPOA

Summary
- Serves: Puerto Obaldia, Panama
- Elevation AMSL: 20 ft / 6 m
- Coordinates: 8°40′10″N 77°25′03″W

Map
- Location of the airport in Panama

Runways
Direction	Length		Surface
Direction	m	ft	Surface
17/35	690	2,264	Concrete
- Source: SkyVector Bing Maps

Puerto Obaldia Airport (IATA: PUE, ICAO: MPOA) is an airport serving Puerto Obaldía, a Caribbean coastal town in the Guna Yala comarca (indigenous province) of Panama.

Between 2008 and 2010, the deteriorated NW/SE runway was replaced with a longer, wider concrete runway 17/35.

The runway runs uphill from the sea. Mountainous terrain immediately south and east requires approach and departure be made over the water.

The La Palma VOR (Ident: PML) is located 45.7 nautical miles (85 km) west-southwest of the airport.

== See also ==
- Transport in Panama
- List of airports in Panama
