= Puerto Obaldía =

Puerto Obaldía Lighthouse
- Location: Puerto Obaldía; Guna Yala; Panama
- Coordinates: 8°40′01.7″N 77°25′14.3″W

Tower
- Foundation: concrete base
- Construction: metal skeletal tower
- Height: 12 metres (39 ft)
- Shape: square pyramidal skeletal tower with balcony and light
- Markings: white tower
- Power source: solar power

Light
- Focal height: 12 metres (39 ft)
- Range: 8 nautical miles (15 km; 9.2 mi)
- Characteristic: L Fl W 10s.

Puerto Obaldía is the smallest and easternmost of the four corregimientos of the Kuna Yala indigenous region of Panama, located on the border with Colombia. This is a mainland area that does not contain any islands.

It has an aerodrome with scheduled flights. There are no roads.

At the census of population of 2000, the number was 672, of which 533 resided in the main town of Puerto Obaldía. Other settlements were La Miel (pop. 80), on the Colombian border, La Boca (pop. 31), and Playa Blanca (pop. 28).

The main industry in Puerto Obaldía is Panamanian border and customs control. It is only some 10 miles from the Colombian border; boats connect it with Acandí, on the Colombian side.

== See also ==
- List of lighthouses in Panama
