= Goedub =

- Location within Panama
- Coordinates: 8°54′0″N 77°42′0″W
- Country: Panama
- Province: Kuna Yala

Population (2008)
  - Total: 1 037

Goedub is a town in the Guna Yala province of Panama.

== Sources ==
- World Gazeteer: Panama – World-Gazetteer.com
