= Rosa Mercedes Ayarza de Morales =

Peruvian composer

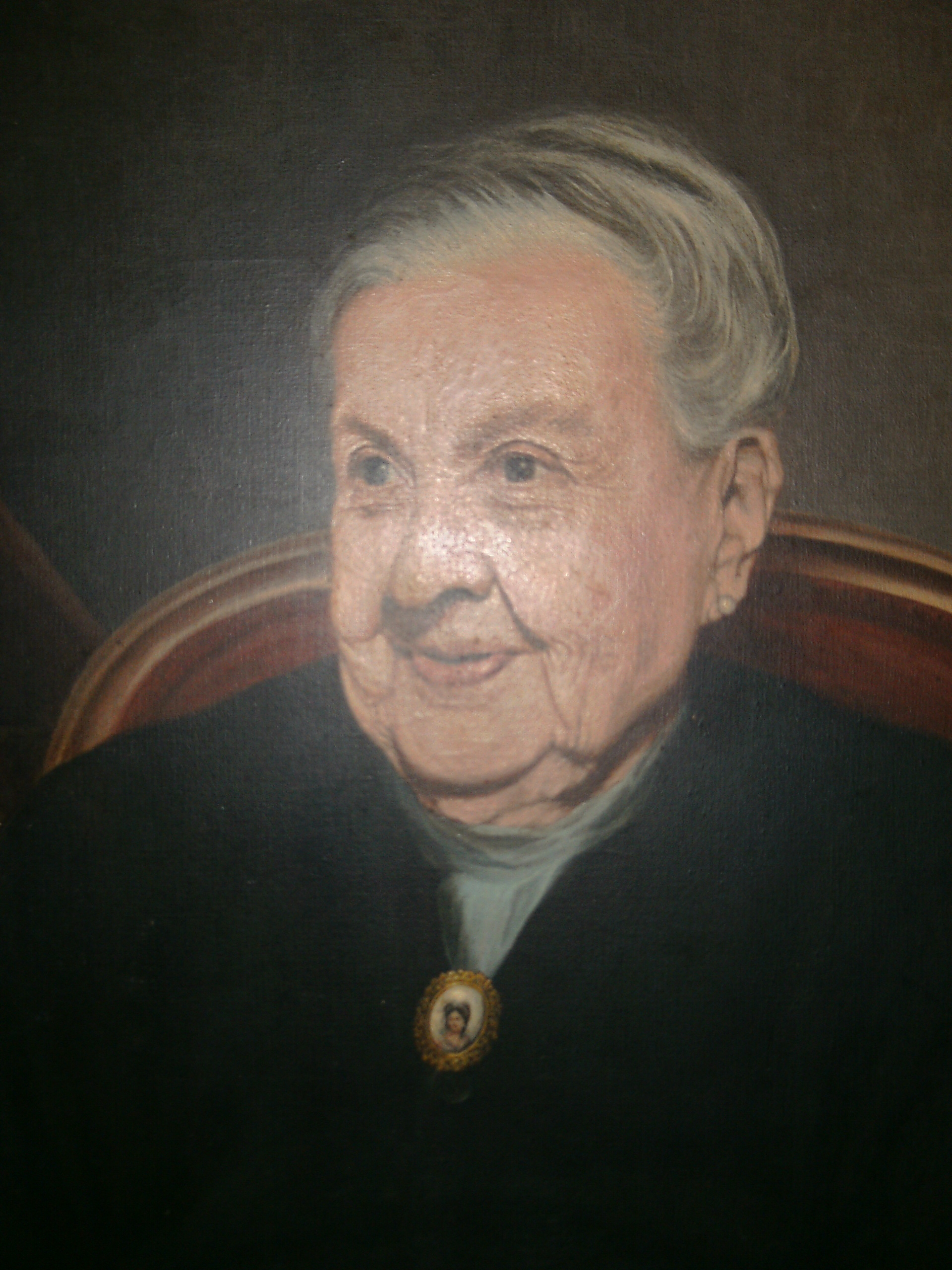

Rosa Mercedes Ayarza de Morales (Lima, July 8, 1881 – May 2, 1969). She was a Peruvian composer and singing teacher.
