= Usdub =

Ustupo
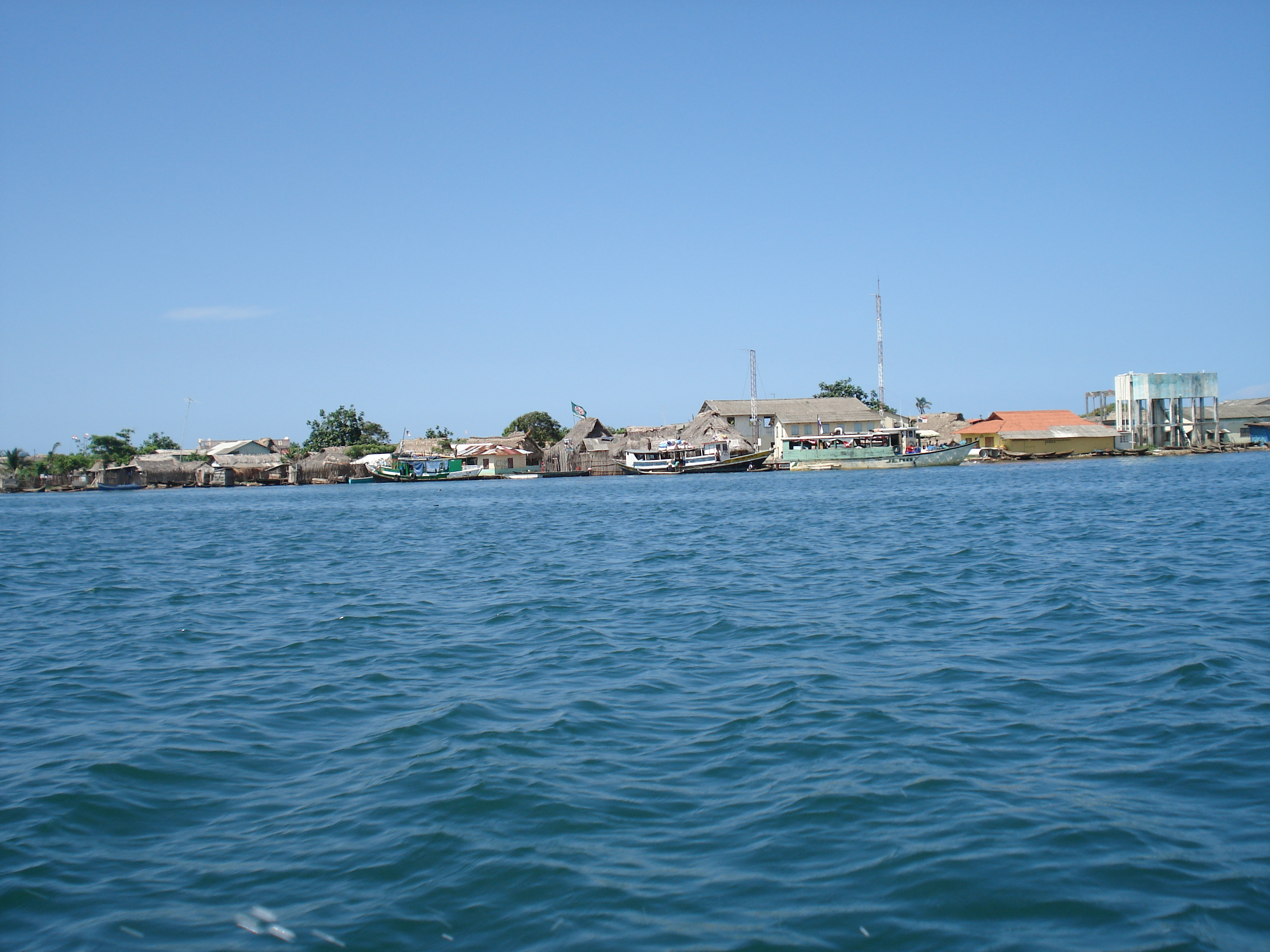
- The harbor of Ustupo

- Location within Panama
- Coordinates: 9°7′48″N 77°55′48″W
- Country: Panama
- Province: Kuna Yala
- Elevation: 3 m (9.8 ft)

Population (2008)
  - Total: 2,802
- Time zone: Eastern

Usdub is a town in the Guna Yala province of Panama. The town comprises several (at least six) small, bridge-linked islands around 600 metres (1,969 ft) off the coast.

Ustupo Airport runway 15/33 bridges between two of the islands. Another runway is onshore.

== Sources ==
- World Gazetteer: Panama – World-Gazetteer.com
- Google Earth
