= Gardi Dubbir =

Town in Guna Yala, Panama

Coordinates: 9°28′35″N 78°57′38″W

Gardi Dubbir, also known as Carti Tupile or just Tupile, is an island in the Narganá District of Guna Yala, Panama. It is one of the five Carti Islands, along with Gardi Sugdub, Asbandub Island, Gardi Yandub, and Gardi Muladub. It is 900 feet long. It has its own Saila.
