= Laguna de Ayarza =

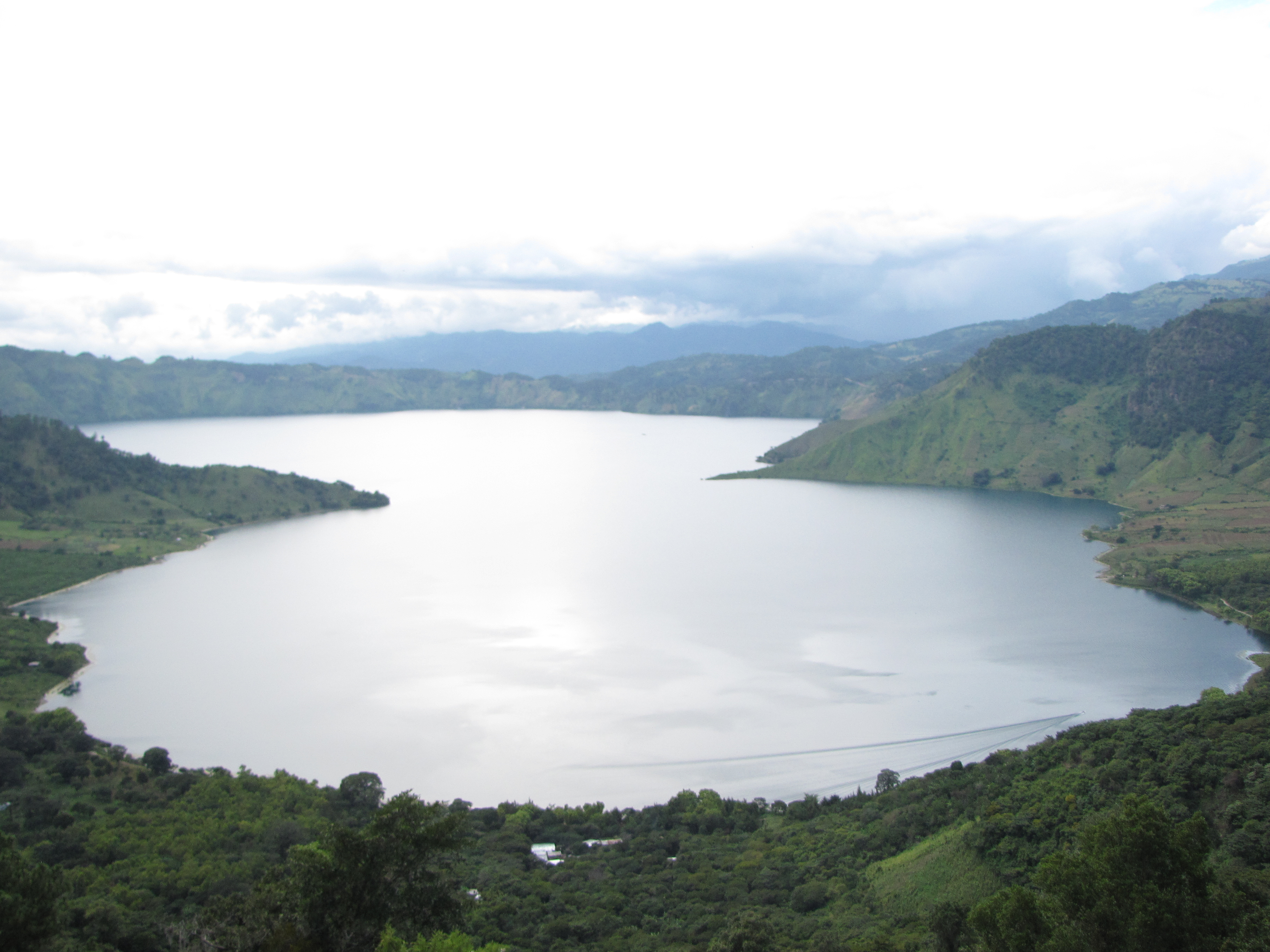
- Laguna de Ayarza, Guatemala

- Location within Guatemala
- Location: Casillas, Santa Rosa
- Coordinates: 14°25′N 90°7′W
- Lake type: Crater lake
- Primary inflows: none
- Primary outflows: none
- Basin countries: Guatemala
- Surface area: 14 km^{2} (5.4 sq mi)
- Max. depth: 230 m (750 ft)
- Surface elevation: 1,409 m (4,623 ft)

Laguna de Ayarza (Spanish pronunciation: [laˈɣuna ðe aˈʝaɾsa]) is a crater lake in Guatemala. The lake is a caldera that was created some 20,000 years ago by a catastrophic eruption that destroyed a twinned volcano and blanketed the entire region with a layer of pumice. The lake has a surface area of 14 km^{2} and a maximum depth of 230 m. The lake has a surface elevation of 1409 m.
