= Mirya Ubgigandub =

Caribbean island of Panama

Coordinates: 9°26′42″N 78°53′59.63″W

Soledad Miria (in the Guna language Miria Ubigantupu or more recently Mirya Ubgigandub) is a small Caribbean island of Panama with 1,014 inhabitants. The island is only 700 metres long but is densely populated. At approximately 9:30 pm on December 26, 2006, a fire started by the explosion of a gas cooker destroyed 39 buildings within 10 minutes, approximately half of those on the island. 348 people were injured, but none died. The island was left with no potable water. Many of the inhabitants of the small island took to the sea in fishing boats to avoid the flames. The island has a local school and is known within Guna Yala for its relatively traditional character and architecture. The settlement includes several ceremonial buildings, and many houses follow Guna building practices, using local materials such as cane, wood and thatch. It is also associated with cultural tourism, particularly because of its traditional architecture and the mola blouses worn by many women. Access for foreign visitors is restricted and generally depends on local permission or accompaniment by a member of the community.
