= Narganá =

Coordinates: 9°27′0″N 78°35′0″W

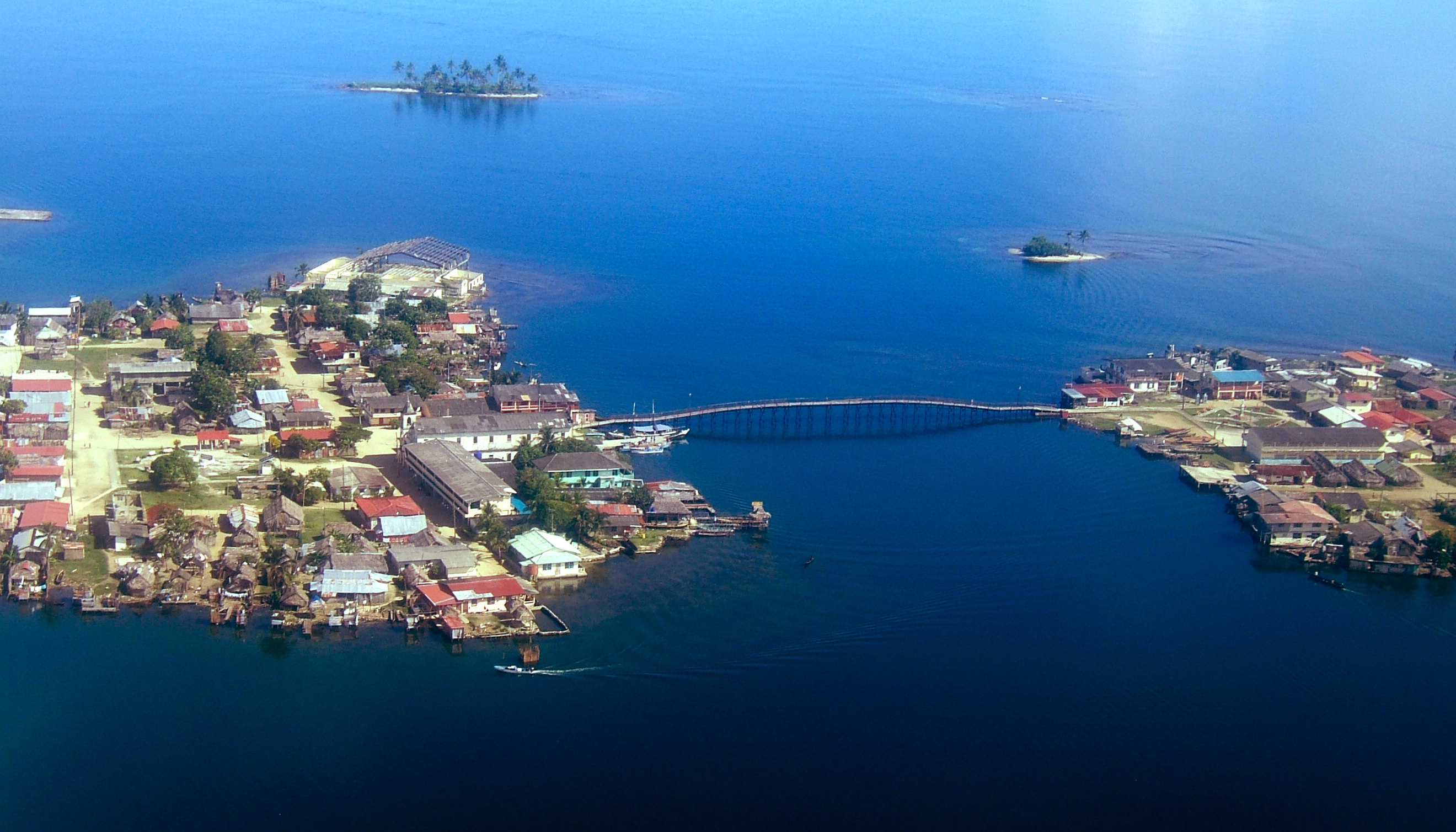
Narganá is the island on the left, and Corazón de Jesús on the right, connected by a bridge

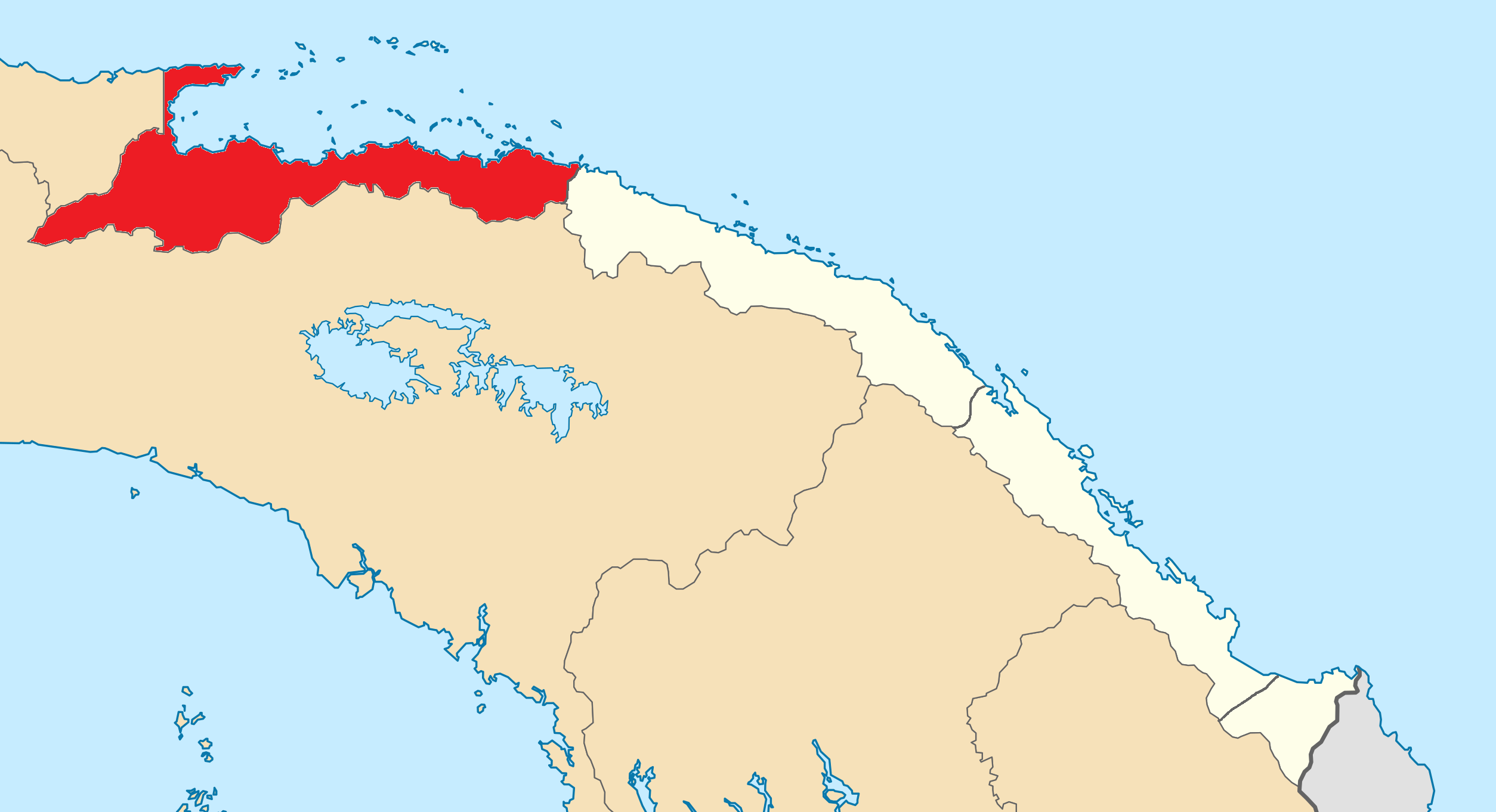

Narganá or Yandup in the Guna language is one of the islands belonging to the Guna Yala, an autonomous territory or comarca in Panama. The culture in Nargana is influenced heavily by Panama and most people there are bilingual speaking both Spanish and the Kuna language. The island has an area of 5.5 hectares and is completely overbuilt, and could be walked around in less than 10 minutes. There is a small hospital and school on the island. The nearest populated island, Corazón de Jesús, is connected to Nargana by a concrete bridge. Both islands are among the most westernized of the San Blas Islands.
