= Gardi Sugdub =

Cartí Sugtupu Carti Suitopo
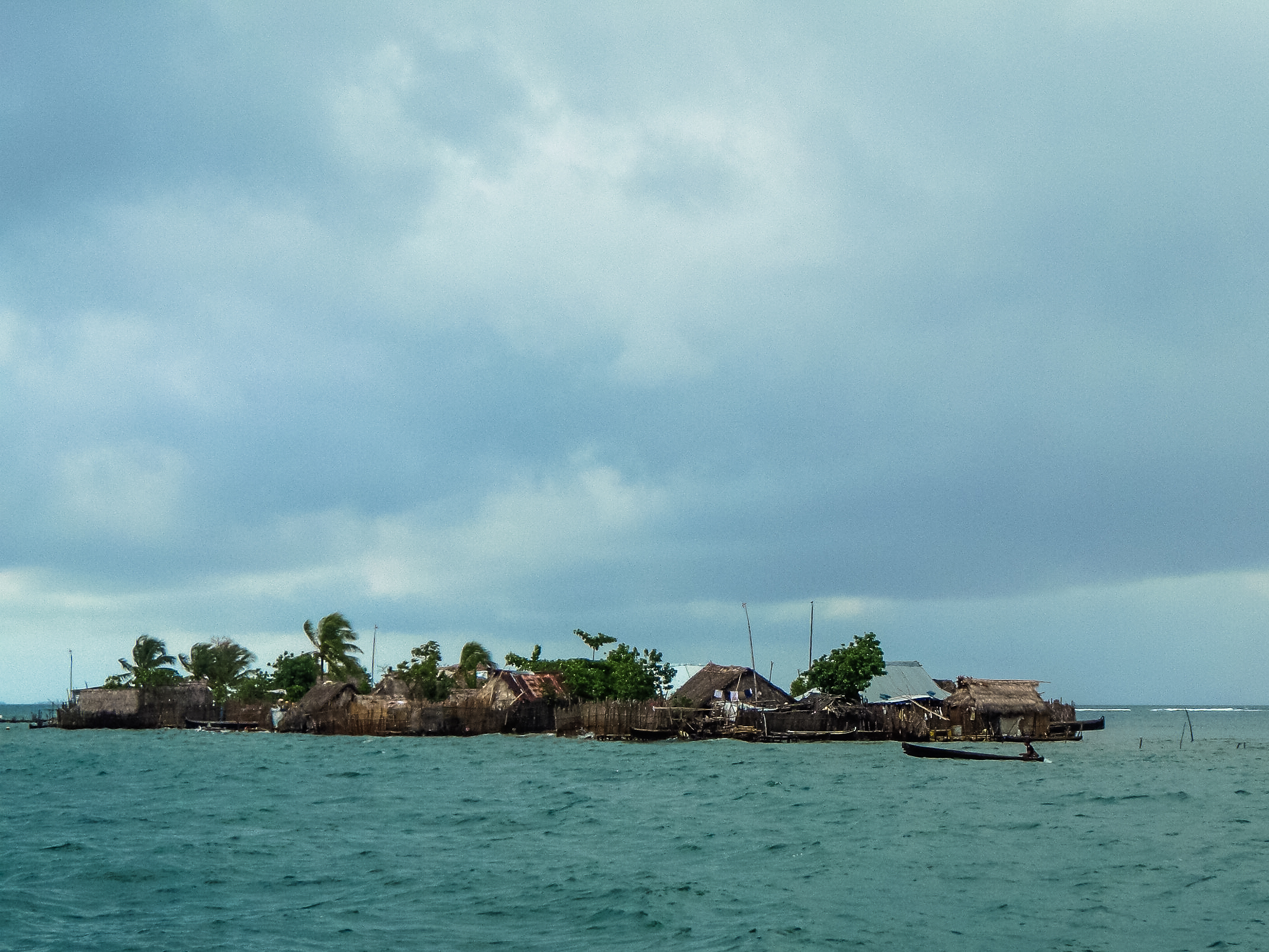

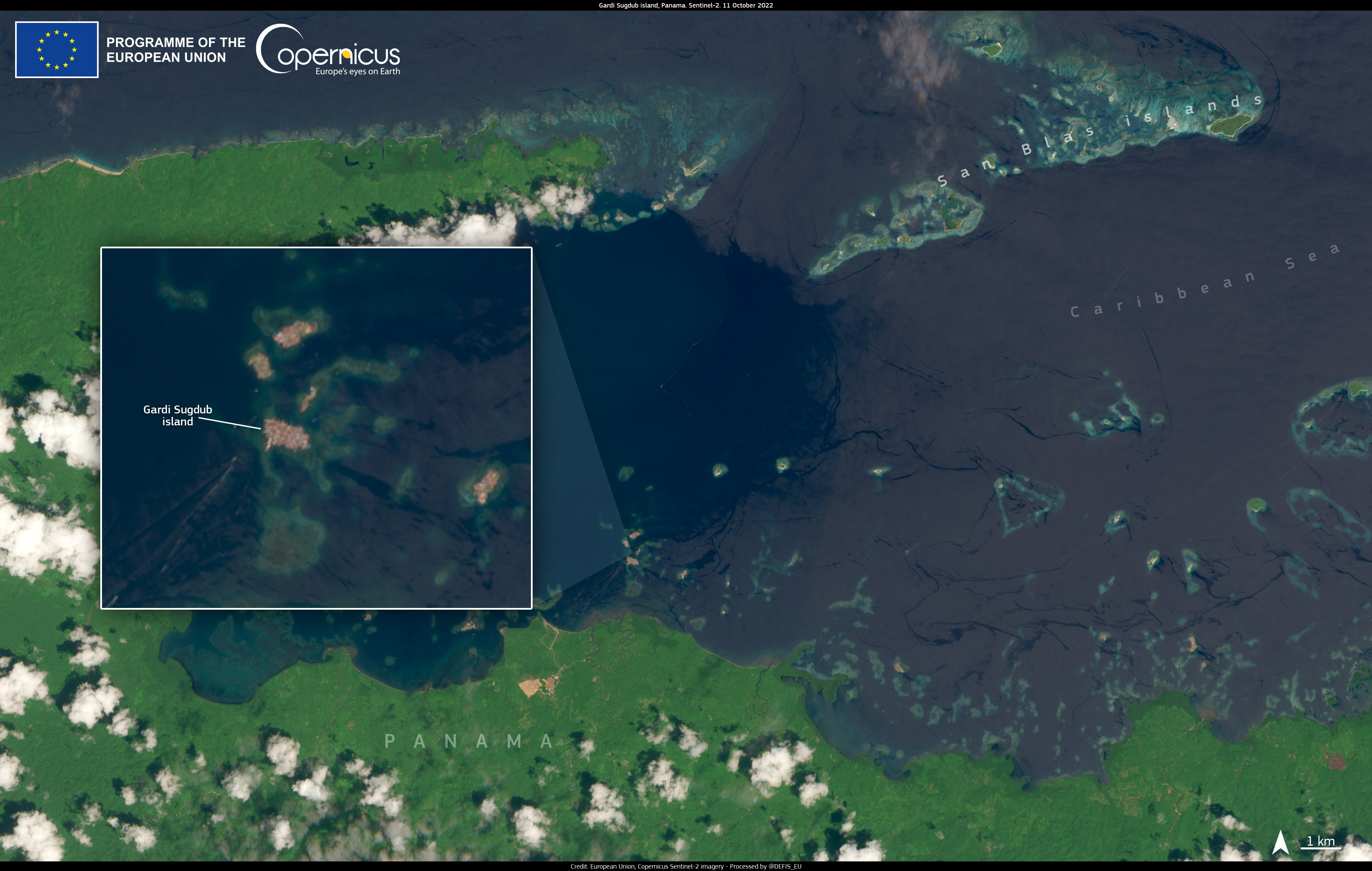
- Satellite image of the Carti Islands

- Location within Guna Yala Location within Panama
- Coordinates: 09°28′14″N 78°57′40″W
- Country: Panama
- Comarca indígena: Guna Yala

Area
  - Total: 0.037 km^{2} (0.014 sq mi)

Population (2025)
  - Total: 100

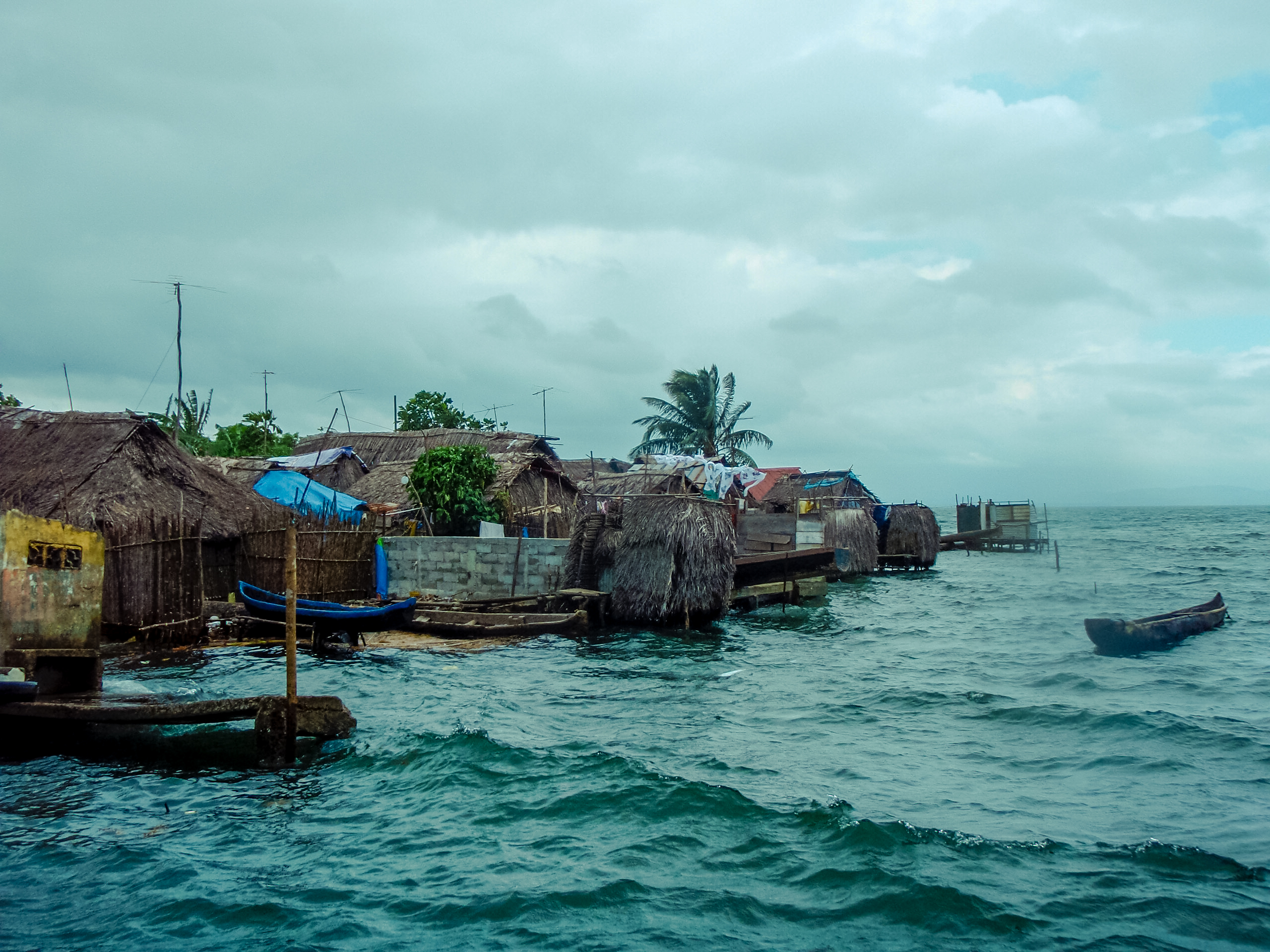

Gardi Sugdub, also spelled Cartí Sugtupu, is an island in the San Blas Archipelago in the Panamanian comarca indígena of Guna Yala.

== History ==
Gardi Sugdub, also spelled Cartí Sugtupu, is an island in the San Blas Archipelago in the Panamanian comarca indígena of Guna Yala, 400m long and 150m wide. It is the southernmost and largest of four populated Carti Islands (the others are Cartí Tupile in the north, Carti Yandup in the west, and Carti Muladub in the east), and lies 1200m off the northern coast of mainland Panama. The island houses a small harbour and a museum, as well as a now-disused schoolhouse. Its indigenous inhabitants are Guna.

Discussions of relocation to a site on the mainland thanks to overpopulation on the island were first raised by Guna elders in 2008. The Panamanian government constructed the new village of Isber Yala between 2015 and 2024, construction being delayed due to funding issues, and following its completion in June 2024, 300 families moved from Gardi Sugdub into the new village.

Although nearby, the new settlement is forested rather than having the same relationship with the sea. Residents described the move with sadness as a major lifestyle change that leaves behind more than 200 years of culture.

The community has been described as the first in Panama to be displaced by climate change, with the government of Panama predicting that rising sea levels will result in the island as well as several other islands in the archipelago being completely underwater by 2050. Some within the community of Gardi Sugdub reject this characterization of the move, pointing out that the size of the island has increased over time thanks to land reclamation by its residents, and that the Guna people did not evacuate their homes even after the 1882 Panama earthquake resulted in waves of 3 metres, far exceeding any forecast sea level rise.

Cartí Sugtupu can be reached by boat from the nearby onshore settlement of Carti, near Isber Yala, which is connected to the main Panamanian road network. The other island groups of the San Blas archipelago, including El Porvenir, Cayos Limones, and Cayos Holandeses, can be reached by taxi boat.
