= Agligandi =

Ailigandí Agligandi
- Location within Panama
- Coordinates: 9°13′40″N 78°1′40″W
- Country: Panama
- Province: Guna Yala
- Elevation: 3 m (9.8 ft)

Population (2008)
  - Total: 1,842

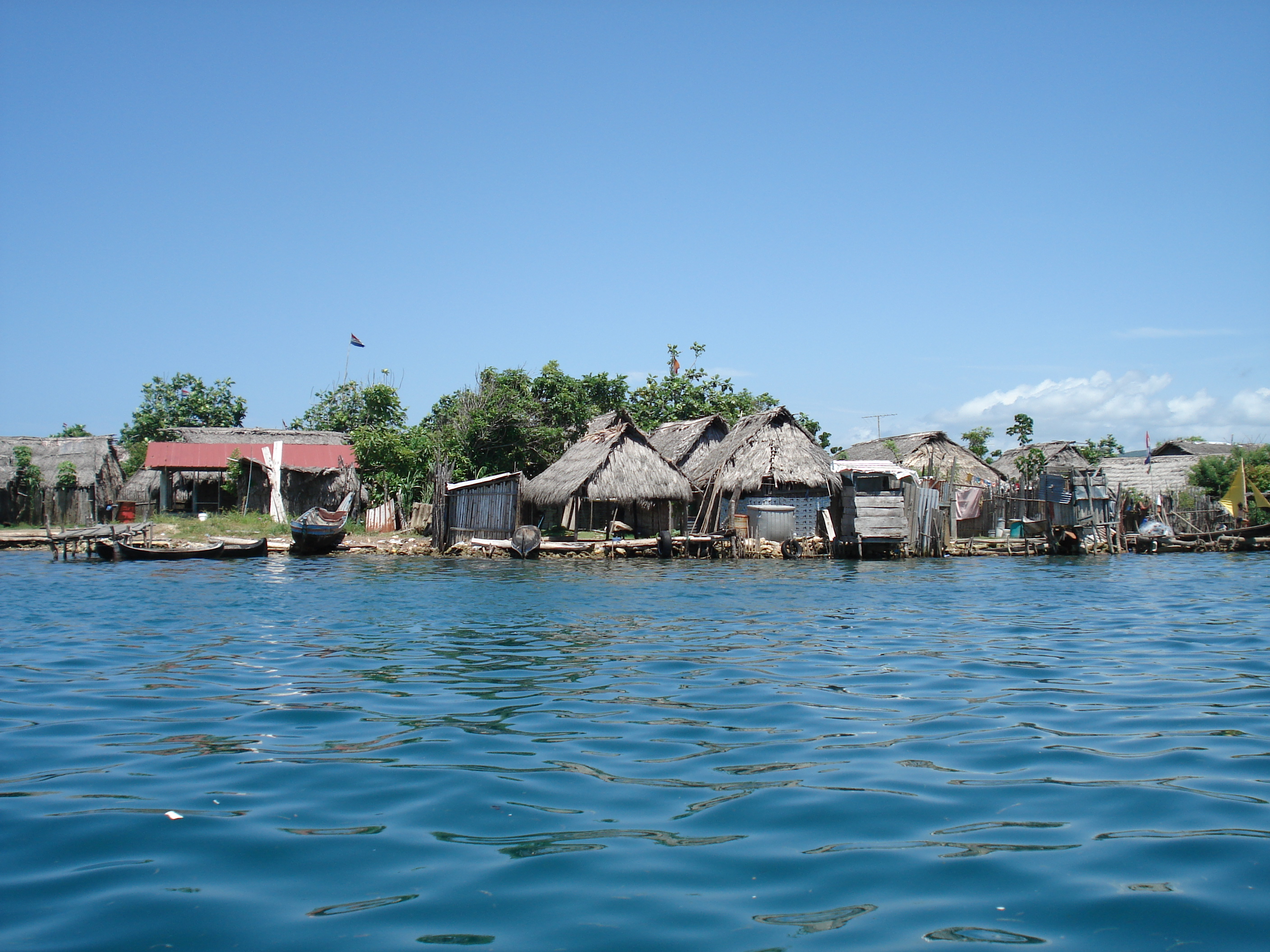
Ailigandí

Ailigandí or Agligandi is a town and island in the Guna Yala province of Panama. The island is just off the coast and is served by Ailigandí Airport. The town is also called Manglar or Mangrove Swamp.

== Sources ==
- Aerial view
