= San Blas Islands =

Archipelago north of Panama

Guna Yala Nickname: Archipiélago de San Blas
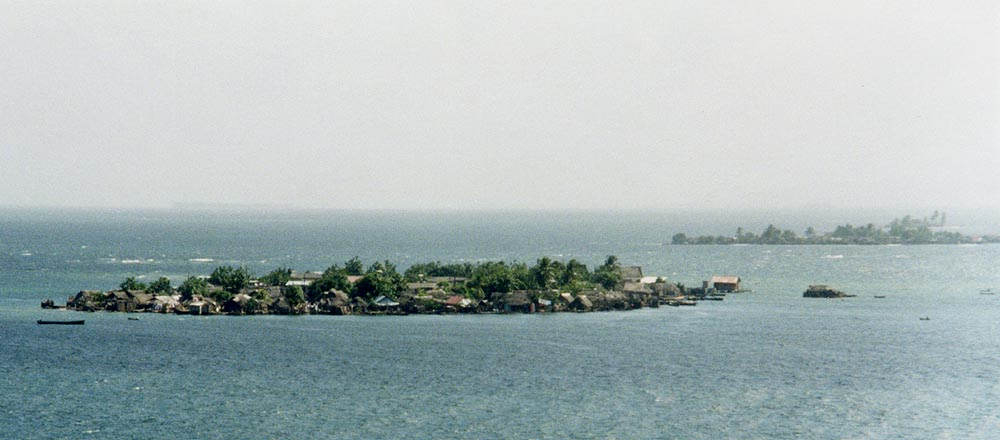
- Islands entirely covered with dwellings

- Location of the San Blas Islands in Panama

Geography
- Coordinates: 9.57°N 78.82°W
- Total islands: 365
- Major islands: 49

Administration
- Panama

The San Blas Islands of Panama is an archipelago comprising approximately 365 islands and cays, of which 49 are inhabited. They lie off the north coast of the Isthmus of Panama, east of the Panama Canal. A part of the comarca (district) Guna Yala along the Caribbean coast of Panama, it is home to the Kuna people.

San Blas and its surrounding area is a haven for ecotourism because of its pristine environs. The area is also popular for sailing, as it is known for its beauty and lack of hurricanes. Notable locations in the Archipelago are the main capital Gaigirgordub, the densely crowded island village of Carti Sugtupu, and the two keys, Cayos Limones, and Cayos Holandeses, both renowned for their clear waters.

The islands could be rendered uninhabitable by sea level rise in the late 21st century. The government of Panama predicted that several islands in the archipelago could be completely submerged by 2050, causing significant displacement requiring plans to move the indigenous residents to the mainland. The island of Carti Sugtupu is currently in the process of having its residents relocated due to frequent floods and rising sea levels, making the community the first in Panama to be displaced by climate change.

== Tradition and legacy ==
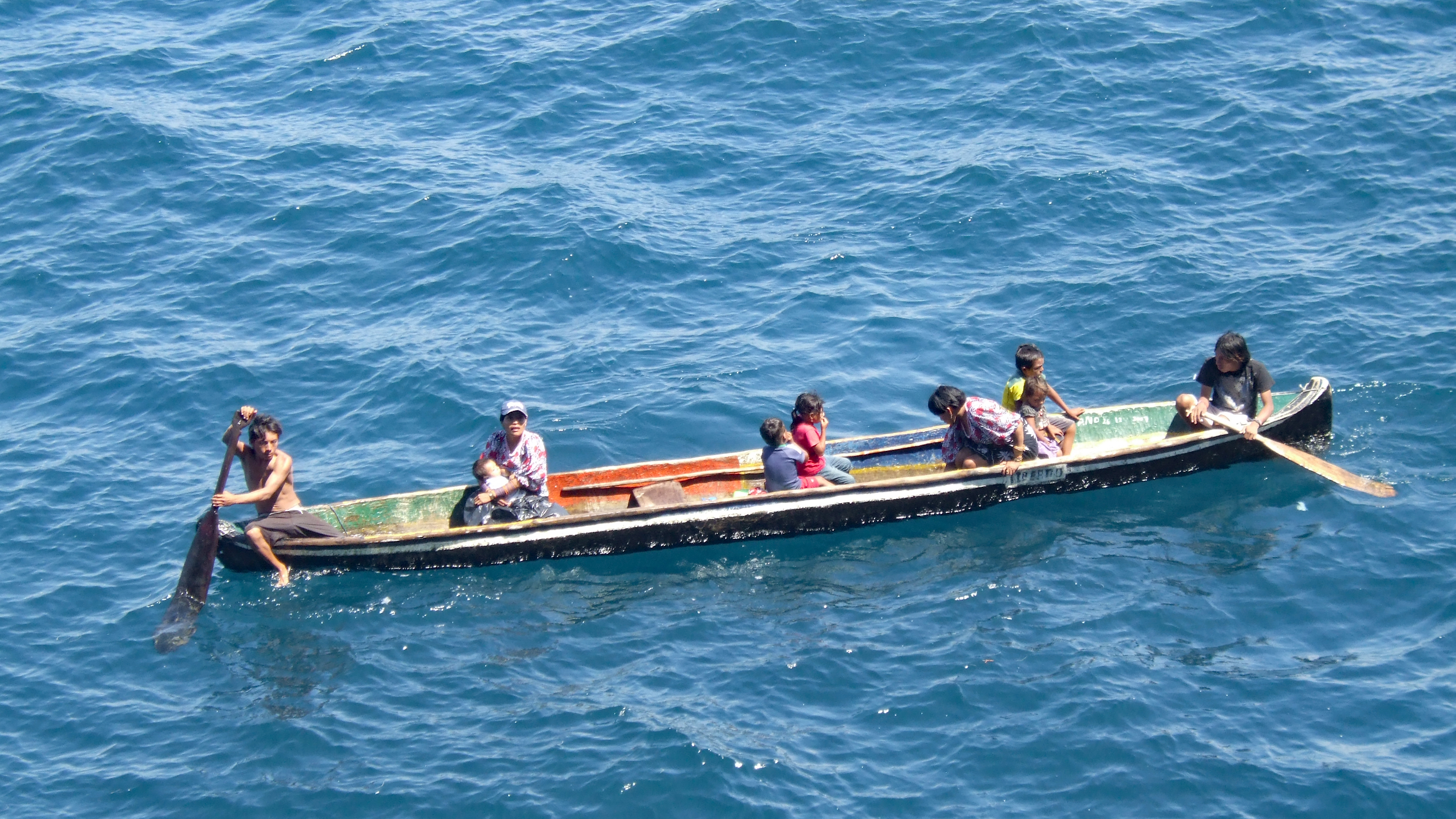
Cayuko dugout canoe

Before the arrival of Europeans, the Guna wore few clothes and decorated their bodies with colorful designs. When encouraged to wear clothes by the missionaries, they copied these designs in their molas, which they wore as clothing.

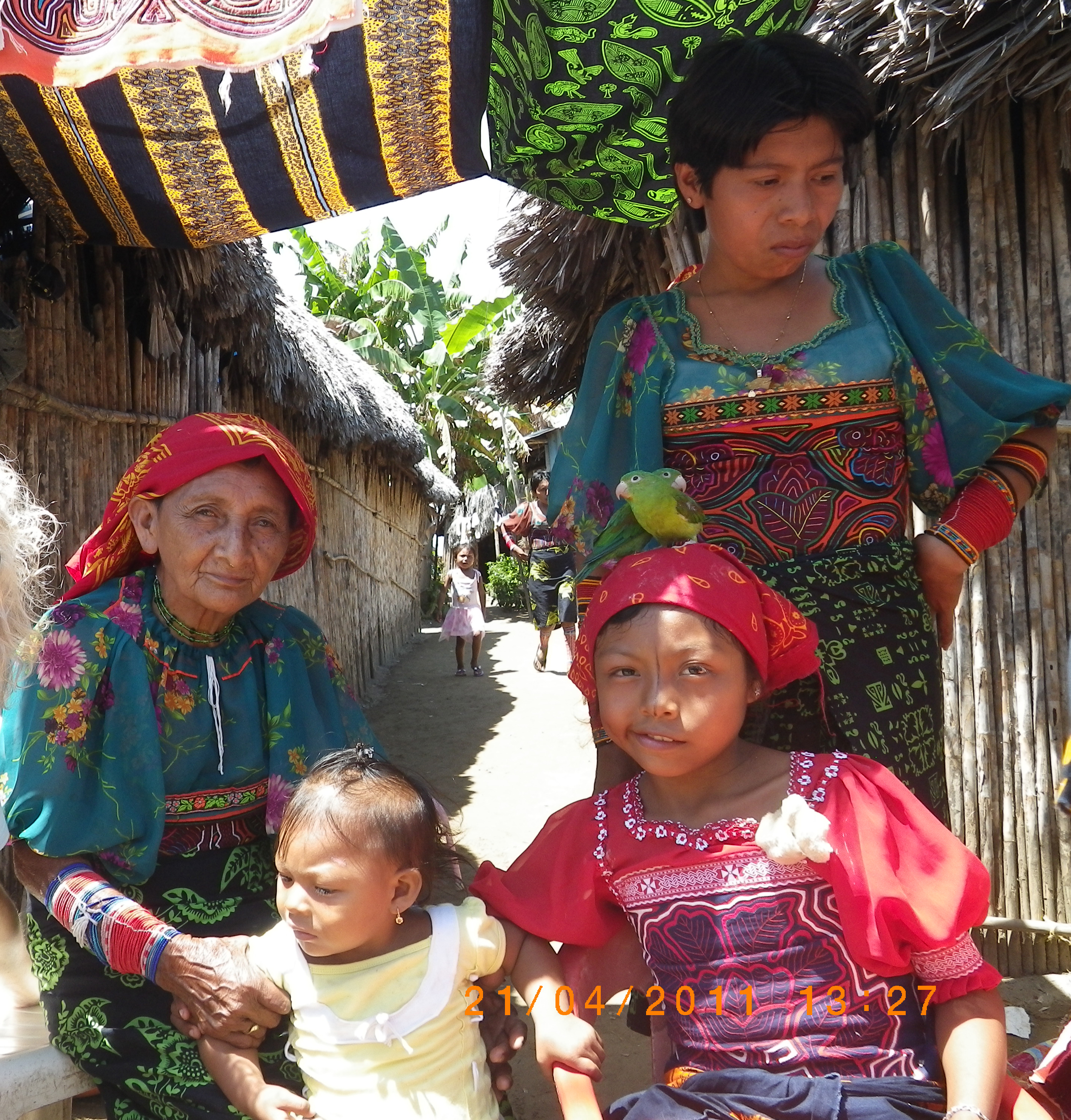
Guna family in their traditional costume

The Guna worship a god named Erragon, who they believe came and died just for the Guna people. Driven off Panama during the Spanish invasion, the Guna fled to the surrounding 378 islands. Today their chief lives on an island called Acuadup, which means "rock island". Many Guna are hunters and fishermen. Many families live close to the mainland in villages and the families will rotate their time living on the islands. On some of the islands, children can attend school. Most of the men now speak Spanish, although the women carry on older traditions. The Guna first learn their indigenous language at home; the schools on the islands then teach both Guna and Spanish as a second language.

From 1679 to 1681, William Dampier started and ended his first journey with privateers and pirates in these islands which he called "The Samballoes," a rendezvous-place for pirates, convenient for hiding and privacy.

The following table synthesizes the geographic clusters, coral barrier environments, settlement characteristics, and local maritime governance across the San Blas Archipelago:

Geographic Clusters, Marine Features, and Settlement Structure of the San Blas Archipelago
Island Cluster / Key	Geographic Setting & Marine Features	Settlement & Demographics	Cultural & Marine Governance
Cartí Group (Western Sector)	Inshore continental shelf near the Mandinga Bay; shallow waters with high terrigenous sediment runoff	Densely populated residential islands (Cartí Sugtupu, Cartí Tupile); focal zone for climate-induced mainland relocation	Administrative gateway connected to the mainland Llano–Cartí road; managed under local Saila leadership.
Cayos Limones (Lemon Cays)	Central outer barrier formation protected by shallow patch reefs and mangrove cays	Sparsely inhabited islets (Nuinudup, Tiadup); traditional seasonal fishing camps	Core navigation corridor for eco-sailing vessels; regulated anchoring overseen by the Congreso General Guna.
Cayos Holandeses (Dutch Cays)	Outermost oceanic barrier reef exposed to Caribbean swells; extensive barrier reefs and high-energy drop-offs	Predominantly uninhabited wilderness cays; barrier sand cays surrounded by deep ocean water	Critical foraging habitat for the hawksbill sea turtle (Eretmochelys imbricata) and offshore coral monitoring grounds.
Cayos Chichime & Eastern Keys	Northernmost coral cays with deep navigable channels and outer reef flats	Low-density indigenous settlements; small-scale artisanal fishing communities	Traditional fishing rights strictly reserved for community members under customary marine tenure.

== Climate ==
The San Blas Islands have a tropical monsoon climate. Temperatures are hot all year round. There is a lengthy wet season from May to January and a short dry season in the rest of the year.

== See also ==
- Provinces of Panama
- Guna Yala
- San Blas Rebellion
- Narasgandub Bipi
