= Guna Yala =

Indigenous province in northeast Panama

- Comarca indígena
- Flag

- Coordinates: 9°33′N 78°58′W
- Country: Panama
- Capital: Gaigirgordub

Area
  - Total: 2,358.2 km^{2} (910.5 sq mi)

Population (2023 census)
  - Total: 32,016

GDP (PPP, constant 2015 values)
  - Year: 2023
  - Total: $100 million
  - Per capita: $4,500
- Time zone: UTC-5 (ETZ)
- ISO 3166 code: PA-KY
- HDI (2017): 0.580 medium

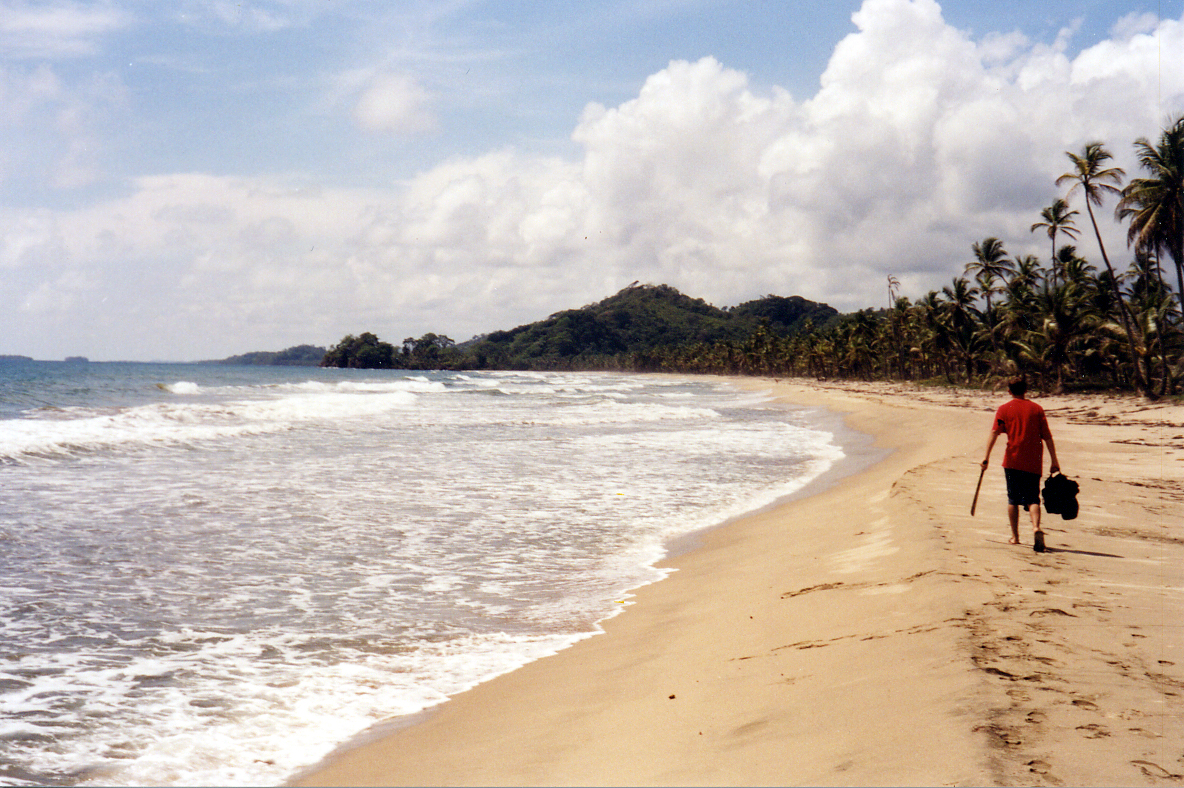
Mainland beaches

Guna Yala, also known as Kuna Yala or by its former name San Blas, is a comarca indígena (indigenous province) in northeast Panama. Guna Yala is home to the indigenous people known as the Gunas. Its capital is Gaigirgordub. It is bounded on the north by the Caribbean Sea, on the south by the Darién Province, Emberá-Wounaan, and Panamá Province, on the east by Colombia, and on the west by the province of Colón.

32,016 people lived here in 2023, with over 95% of them being indigenous peoples.

== Etymology ==
Guna Yala in Guna means "Land Guna" or "Guna Mountain". The area was formerly known as San Blas, and later as Kuna Yala, but the name was changed in October 2011 to "Guna Yala" when the Government of Panama recognized the claim of the people that "Guna" was a closer representation of the name.

== History ==
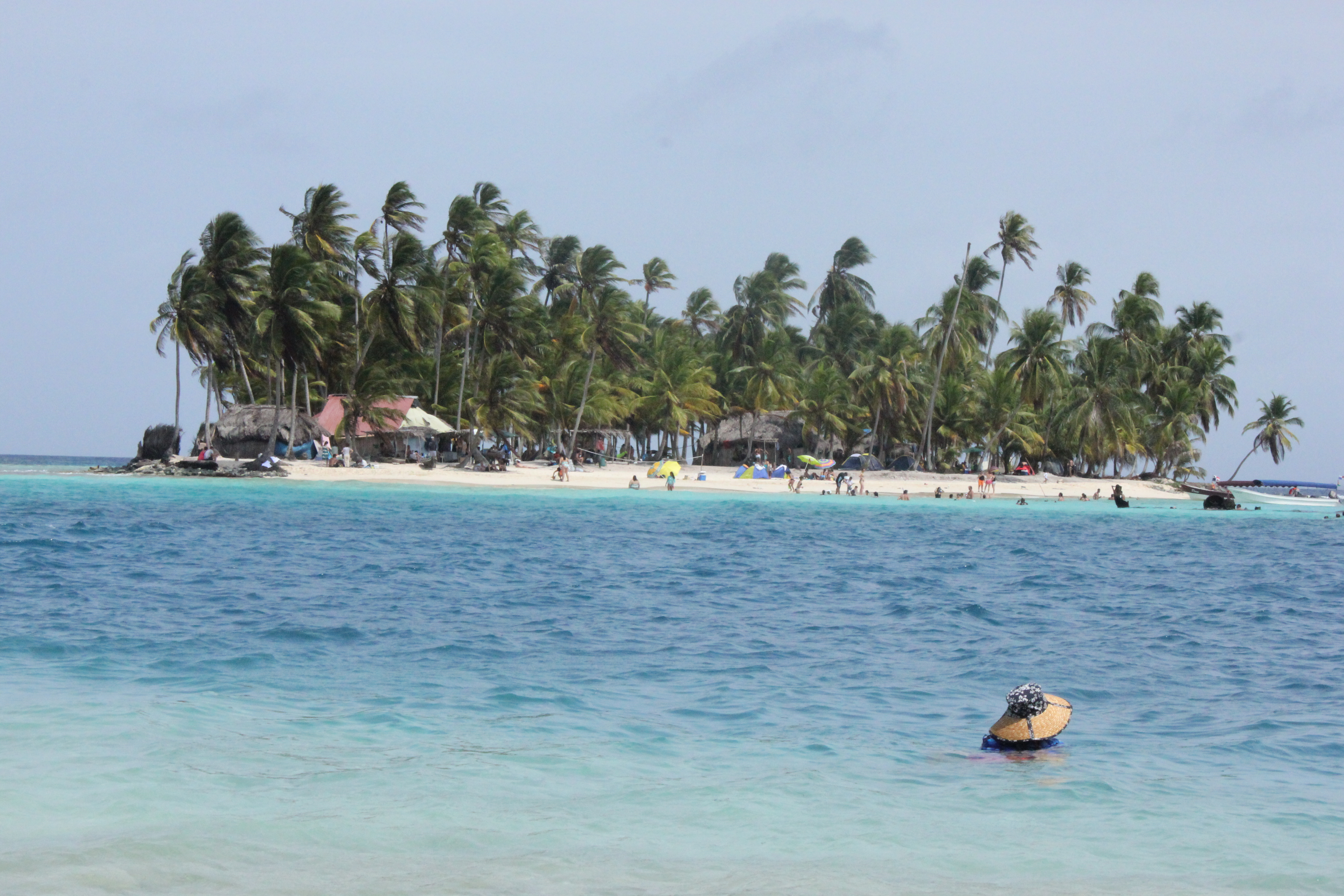
Perro Island, Guna Yala

The area was the site of the conquistador stronghold of Acla, where Vasco Núñez de Balboa was tried and beheaded.

When the Spaniards arrived in the 1600s, the Kuna people were living here near the Gulf of Urabá, in what is considered Colombia today. However, contact with the Spaniards resulted in significant violence and limited trade. The Kuna fled towards the Darién region, what is considered Panama today. They initially began to live along the rivers which flowed into the Caribbean, however as early as the mid 1800s they began to relocate out onto islands near the mouths of freshwater rivers. This sheltered them from illnesses, snakes and mosquitos. Living on the islands also connected them to the coastal trade, forest products, coconuts and turtle-shell. It also gave the Kuna access to trade vessels travelling along coastal routes. They lived in this way on the islands, and maintained their farms on the mainland. Until the mid-nineteenth century this region remained relatively peaceful.

In the late 1690s, the Darien scheme in the Kingdom of Scotland attempted to create an overseas colony in the region, hoping to open an overland route between the Atlantic and Pacific oceans, almost two centuries prior to the opening of the Panama Canal. They founded the town of New Edinburgh on a bay they named the Bay of Caledonia (a few kilometres southeast of modern Ustupo), as the capital of a new colony to be named "Caledonia" after the Latin name for Scotland. A combination of poor planning, famine, tropical disease and collusion between the East India Company and the Kingdom of England to frustrate the scheme led to the failure of the colony and the death of the majority of the colonists. The town finally surrendered to a siege and blockade of the port by forces of the Spanish Empire in March 1700, and the few survivors were evacuated. Of the 2,500 colonists who had left Scotland, barely a few hundred returned. This costly and high-profile failure caused the bankruptcy of the Scottish government and was a major contributory factor in weakening resistance to the loss of Scottish sovereignty to London through the Act of Union less than a decade later.

By the Colombian Act of June 4, 1870 Tulenega Shire was created, which also included the present territory of the Guna Yala district; this comprises some of the communities of the District of Wargandí such as Mordi, and Sogubdi Asnadi; the communities of the region of Madungandi including Tiuarsicuá, and Guna communities of Colombia, such as Tanela and Arquía. The land area of the Tulenega Shire stretched from the province of Colon to the Gulf of Urabá, Colombia. The head of regional government was generally a commissioner appointed by the central government. The law also recognized the Guna as property owners of the Shire.

After separation of Panama in 1903, the Act of 1870 was ignored. The territory of the former region was divided de facto into two parts: the majority remained in the new Republic of Panama, while a small portion remained in Colombia.

The suspension of the region, the incursions of outsiders into Guna villages in search of gold, rubber, and sea turtles, banana concessions, and colonial police abuse caused great discontent among the natives and brought the February 25, 1925 San Blas Rebellion, led by Nele Kantule of the town of Ustupu and Ologintipipilele (Simral Colman) of Ailigandi. The armed Guna attacked the police on the islands and Ugupseni Tupile, as the police were accused of abuses and suppressing Guna customs in several communities. The Guna proclaimed the independent Republic of Tule, separating from the central government of Panama for a few days.

The subsequent peace treaty established the commitment of the Government of Panama to protecting the customs of the Guna. The Guna, in turn, accepted the development of a formal school system in the islands. The police brigade would be expelled from their territory and all prisoners released. The negotiations that ended the armed conflict constituted a first step towards establishing the autonomous status of the Guna and maintaining the culture that was being suppressed.

Based on Article 5 of the Constitution of 1904, which allows for special political divisions for reasons of administrative convenience or public service, legislation on indigenous territories in Panama established the Guna District of San Blas in 1938 including areas of the provinces of Panamá and Colón. Its boundaries and administration were finalized by Act No. 16 of 1953.

Currently, according to the ruling of the Supreme Court of 23 March 2001, the region has a different political and administrative organization, independent of the Districts and Villages. The counties are governed by special institutions themselves, and by resolution of Division of the Supreme Court, on 6 December 2000, an institution is the consent of indigenous peoples who wish to develop projects in their territories.

The Colombian political activist Jaime Bateman Cayón, founder and leader of the M-19 movement, died in a plane crash in Guna Yala in 1983.

Governor Erick Martelo was removed from office in September 2020 after being found traveling in a car with 75 packages of illegal drugs.

== Government and politics ==
The governmental structure of Guna Yala is defined in Law 16 of 1953. The General Congress Guna is the highest political authority of Guna Yala. It consists of representatives of all communities in Guna Yala, and meets twice a year. Votes are taken by each sahila (elected leader) of the community.

== Administrative subdivisions of Guna Yala ==
Guna Yala is politically subdivided into four corregimientos (districts), with a total of 51 comunidades (communities), most of which are located on islands of the San Blas Archipelago off the mainland coast. They are listed from west to east:

Number	Leader (2024)	Community	District
1	Carlos Lopez	Armila	Dubwala
2	Faustino Castro	Aswemullu	Dubwala
3	Fabián Morris Pérez	Yansibdiwar	Dubwala
4	Ceferino Hernández	Gannirdub / Goedub	Dubwala
5	César Guardia	Nubadub	Dubwala
6	Milton Gutiérrez	Dubwala	Dubwala
7	Ricardito Martinez	Sasardi Nuevo	Dubwala
8	Geraldino Green	Sasardi Muladub	Dubwala
9	Fidencio Perez	Dubbag	Dubwala
10	Palacio Ramirez	Nabagandi	Dubwala
11	Luis Rinkin	Mamsuggun	Dubwala
12	Macriano Denis	Usdub	Agligandi
13	Celio De León	Ogobsuggun	Agligandi
14	Olmedo Herrera	Mammidub	Agligandi
15	Olopiñapi Lan	Assudub	Agligandi
16	Límber Ríos	Agligandi	Agligandi
17	Diego Núñez	Dadnaggwe Dubbir	Agligandi
18	Luis Layans	Uggubseni	Agligandi
19	Deodicio Grimaldo	Golebir / Irgandi	Agligandi
20	Fredy Sosa	Nurmullu / Uggubba	Agligandi
21	Albertino Martínez	Ilagandidiwar / Agdirgana	Agligandi
22	Claudiano Iglesias	Ubgisuggun /Magebgandi	Nargana
23	Leocadio Ortiz	Niadub	Nargana
24	Manduliginya Colman F.	Digir	Nargana
25	Aldo González	Yandub-Nargana	Nargana
26	Heliodoro Osorio	Aggwanusadub	Nargana
27	Nelio Preciado	Uwargandub-Gwebdi	Nargana
28	Leoncio Bolívar Ceballos	Nusadub	Nargana
29	Américo Tapia	Urgandi	Nargana
30	Leuterio Díaz	Mammardub	Nargana
31	Elías Pérez	Moraggedub	Nargana
32	Geraldito Barsallo	Mirya Ubgigandub	Nargana
33	Alberto Davies	Gardi Muladub	Nargana
34	José Devis	Gardi Sugdub / Isber Yala	Nargana
35	Vallarino López	Gardi Yandub	Nargana
36	Baulino Morris	Gardi Dubbir	Nargana
37	Aristides Ben	Aggwadub	Nargana
38	Eliseo López	Narbagandub Bibbi	Nargana
39	Valerio Martínez	Narbagandub Dummad	Nargana
40	Emilio Valdés	Gangandi	Nargana
41	Elbasio Martínez	Mandiyala	Nargana
42	Aquilino Fernández	Aridub	Nargana
43	Rogeliano Martínez	Mandi Ubgigandub	Nargana
44	Arcelio Campos	Orosdub	Nargana
45	Leoncio López	Aglidub	Nargana
46	Franky Smith	Dadargwanne Mammidub	Nargana
47	Romeldo Fernández	Gorbisgi	Nargana
48	Pawell Chiari	Nalunega	Nargana
49	Arcelio González	Wissubwala	Nargana
50		Armali / Puerto Obaldía	Puerto Obaldía
51		Assagandi / La Miel	Puerto Obaldía

== Geography ==
This map shows the three comarcas indígenas, including Yala Guna on the northeast coast, Wargandí Mostar and Madugandí are not shown.

The Guna District of Yala or Guna Yala Region has an area of 2,306 square kilometres (890.35 sq mi). It consists of a narrow strip of land of 373-kilometre (232 mi) long on the east coast of Caribbean Panama, bordering the province of Darién and Colombia. An archipelago of 365 islands is around the coast, of which 50 are inhabited.

By boat, going from the most southeastern point, Puerto Obaldia, to the most northwestern point, Gaigirgordub, is a bit more than 100 miles.

The region lies on the north coast of Panama, situated east of the Panama canal, but also nearby the border into Colombia. It is situated conveniently near canal routes, and is a well known area for sailing. The islands however, are at risk of becoming uninhabitable by the late 21st century due to rising sea levels.

== Economy ==
The economy of Guna Yala is mainly agriculture, fishing, tourism, and handicraft production.

Agriculture in Guna Yala is for subsistence purposes. Traditional products are bananas (now the Chinese banana), corn, and sugar cane. Coconuts are also produced as a source of income.

The fishery is artisanal, usually using wire (line) or networks. Most fishing is for sale. The seafood is especially intended for sale, for which planes come daily to the islands. Sold are lobster, crab, squid, and octopus.

The production of molas is the main activity of Guna women, and is for many families the principal source of income.

There are tourist facilities in Guna Yala. Most are small hotels for ecotourism. Most of them are in the field of Gardi, but there are also several in the township of Agligandi.

Another source of income is remittances from relatives working in the cities of Panama and Colon.

== Customs and traditions ==
Kuna Yala dancing at a Tribal Gathering in 2013

Among the most important traditions of the Guna people there are:

"Iggo inna", or "Feast of the Needle" in lack of a more accurate translation, is the feast of puberty where a young girl after her first menstruation participates in a party.

Children between 4 and 5 take part in ceremony of "inna suid" or Baptism. It involves their first haircut, which is attended by all the people in the community. This name is next to the name given in the country's official language.

The Night Festival or "inna mutiki" is a party where all the people get involved in the celebration of a wedding or a new marriage in the community. This festival usually lasts several days until the liquor stock garnered by the families is finished.

== Demographics ==
The Guna District of Yala has a population of 31,557 inhabitants (2010), which shows a progressive decrease in the population.

== Guna Revolution ==
The Guna Revolution refers to the events in 1925, in which the Indigenous population of Guna Yala fought the ruling Panamanian authorities, who were attempting to force the Indians to adopt Hispanic culture by military action. During this revolution the Guna Yala territory seceded and operated as the short-lived Republic of Tule. Following mediation by the United States, the Guna re-united with Panama. The Gunas, with the support of the Panamanian government, created an autonomous territory called the Guna Yala district for the indigenous inhabitants which they would rule themselves.

=== Background ===
During the first twenty years of the independent country of Panama, the Kuna had serious differences with national governments, because they tried to eradicate their culture, their customs, and their disrespect, indigenous authorities wanted to strip the land apart and were outraged by the governors and the colonial police (a settler to a native, is a non-Indian). This is linked to an incident on April 20, 1921, which was staged in the Corazón de Jesús Narganá and Westernization movement for women, which was to change clothes, take away the gold ring in the nose, the plates high carat gold, beads, winks, and coin necklaces worn as ornaments. But a woman escaped and fled to Rio Narganá Sugar, from which it came. The police in retaliation imprisoned his children and his son, who was released to the outside to look.

That day at Sugar River had an indigenous congress and there it was decided not to let the woman go, so the sahila on behalf of the community sent a message saying that the police were not looking for it. The police did not heed the message that night and sent a commission to Rio Colonial Sugar two police officers and three Indians. When trying to stop some of the male relatives of women, began the battle and killed three residents of the town, two Indian policemen and others were injured with machete wildly as they fled in a canoe. The bodies of the policemen were left in the water, tied to a stick in the sand enlcavado until they came to collect their families.

=== Revolution ===
The flag of the Revolution Guna, adopted in 1925.

Alternate version, adopted in 1942.

In 1925, the Guna leaders planned and arranged a major revolt. The leaders were advised and supported by Richard Marsh and Anne Coope. Marsh later wrote their declaration of independence.

The situation worsened until February 12, 1925, in a conference held in Ailigandi, where he met top leaders of 45 villages and tribes. The conference lasted 26 days, proclaiming the Republic of Tule, and fixing territorial limits. This uprising was under a flag was made by Waga Ebinkili (Mary Colman), granddaughter of Chief Simral Colman. It had a rectangular design with stripes. The center was yellow with the upper and lower stripes in red and with a figure of left facing swastika. On February 21, 10 days after the declaration of independence, in the midst of the Carnival, indigenous revolution broke out that lasted until 27 February, which was led by Nele Gantule and chief Colman. It is said that the insurgents were traveling in canoes from indigenous and Carti Ailigandi for the purpose of attacking the National Police headquarters in Playon Chico, Río Tigre, Tigantigí, Narganá, UGAP and elsewhere in the archipelago, and carried much of the police contingent. The toll was 27 dead.

On 4 March, with the presence of the American minister, John G. South, was signed the peace agreement with the Guna, who were promised a better deal, respect for their customs, not to impose the establishment of schools, and were assured the same protection and rights enjoyed by other citizens. The Guna, in turn, pledged to lay down their weapons, withdraw their declaration of independence, and abide by the laws of Panama.

== See also ==
- Mola (art form)
- San Blas Islands
