= Ancón =

Ancón may refer to:

== Places ==
Antiquity

- Ancon (Picenum), town of ancient Picenum, now in Italy
- Ancon (Pontus), town of ancient Pontus, now in Turkey

Ecuador

- Ancón, Ecuador, a parish in Santa Elena

Panama

- Ancón, Panama, a city in central Panama
- Ancon Hill, a hill overlooking Panama City

Peru

- Ancon (archaeological site)
- Ancón District, a district of Peru

== Ships ==
- Ancon (1867 ship), a sidewheel paddle steamer that was wrecked in Alaska in 1889
- Ancon (1894), a steel-hulled three-masted barque that was scrapped in 1921
- SS Ancon (1901), the first steamship officially to transit the Panama Canal in 1914
- USS Ancon (AGC-4), a 1939 steamship that was a AGC-4 troopship

== Other ==
- Treaty of Ancón, signed by Peru and Chile on 20 October 1883
- ANCON, a conservation group in Panama
- Ancon, a UK company that makes steel products for the construction industry
- Ancon sheep, an extinct breed of sheep
