= Sambú Airport =

Airport in Panama, Central America

- IATA: SAX; ICAO: MPSB

Summary
- Serves: Sambú, Darién Province
- Elevation AMSL: 39 ft / 12 m
- Coordinates: 8°01′35″N 78°12′35″W

Map
- Location of the airport in Panama

Runways
Direction	Length		Surface
Direction	m	ft	Surface
12/30	600	1,969	Concrete
- Source: Google Maps OurAirports

Sambú Airport (IATA: SAX, ICAO: MPSB) is an airport serving the Sambú River towns of Sambú and Puerto Indio, Panama.

== See also ==
- List of airports in Panama
- Transport in Panama
