= Reserva Punta Patiño Airport =

Punta Patiño Airport
- IATA: none; ICAO: none

Summary
- Airport type: Public
- Serves: Punta Patiño, Panama
- Elevation AMSL: 30 ft / 9 m
- Coordinates: 8°15′10″N 78°16′45″W

Map
- Location of the airport in Panama

Runways
Direction	Length		Surface
Direction	m	ft	Surface
05/23	1,060	3,478	Grass
- Sources: Bing Maps

Punta Patiño Airport is an airstrip serving the Punta Patiño nature reserve in the Darién Province of Panama. The runway follows along the shoreline of the Bay of San Miguel.

Air Panama offers charter service to Punta Patiño.

== See also ==
- Transport in Panama
- List of airports in Panama
