= MPSB =

MPSB can stand for:

- Morehouse Parish School Board, a school district in Louisiana
- Metropolitan Police Special Branch (1883–2006), a former unit in the Metropolitan Police of London
- Mecklenburg-Pommersche Schmalspurbahn (1882–1945), a former Narrow-gauge railways in Germany
- Sambú Airport, ICAO code MPSB
