= Gorgas Hospital =

Coordinates: 8.9602°N 79.5466°W

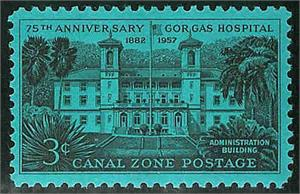
- Canal Zone postage stamp commemorating 75th Anniversary of Gorgas Hospital

Geography
- Location: Ancón, Panama, Panama City, Panama, Panama

Services
- Beds: 143

History
- Founded: 1882 (France); 1904 (United States)
- Closed: 1997

Links
- Lists: Hospitals in Panama

Gorgas Hospital was a U.S. Army hospital in Panama City, Panama, named for Army Surgeon General William C. Gorgas (1854—1920).

Built on the site of an earlier (1882) French hospital called L'Hospital Notre Dame de Canal, it was originally (1904) christened Ancon Hospital by the Americans. It was originally built of wood but was rebuilt in concrete in 1915 by Samuel Hitt. It was renamed Gorgas Hospital in 1928.

Gorgas Hospital is located on Ancon Hill. It was managed by the U.S. Army for most of the 20th century but is now, in accordance with the Torrijos–Carter Treaties (1977), in Panamanian hands. Since October 1999, it has been home to the Instituto Oncológico Nacional.

== History ==
=== Early years (1904–28) ===
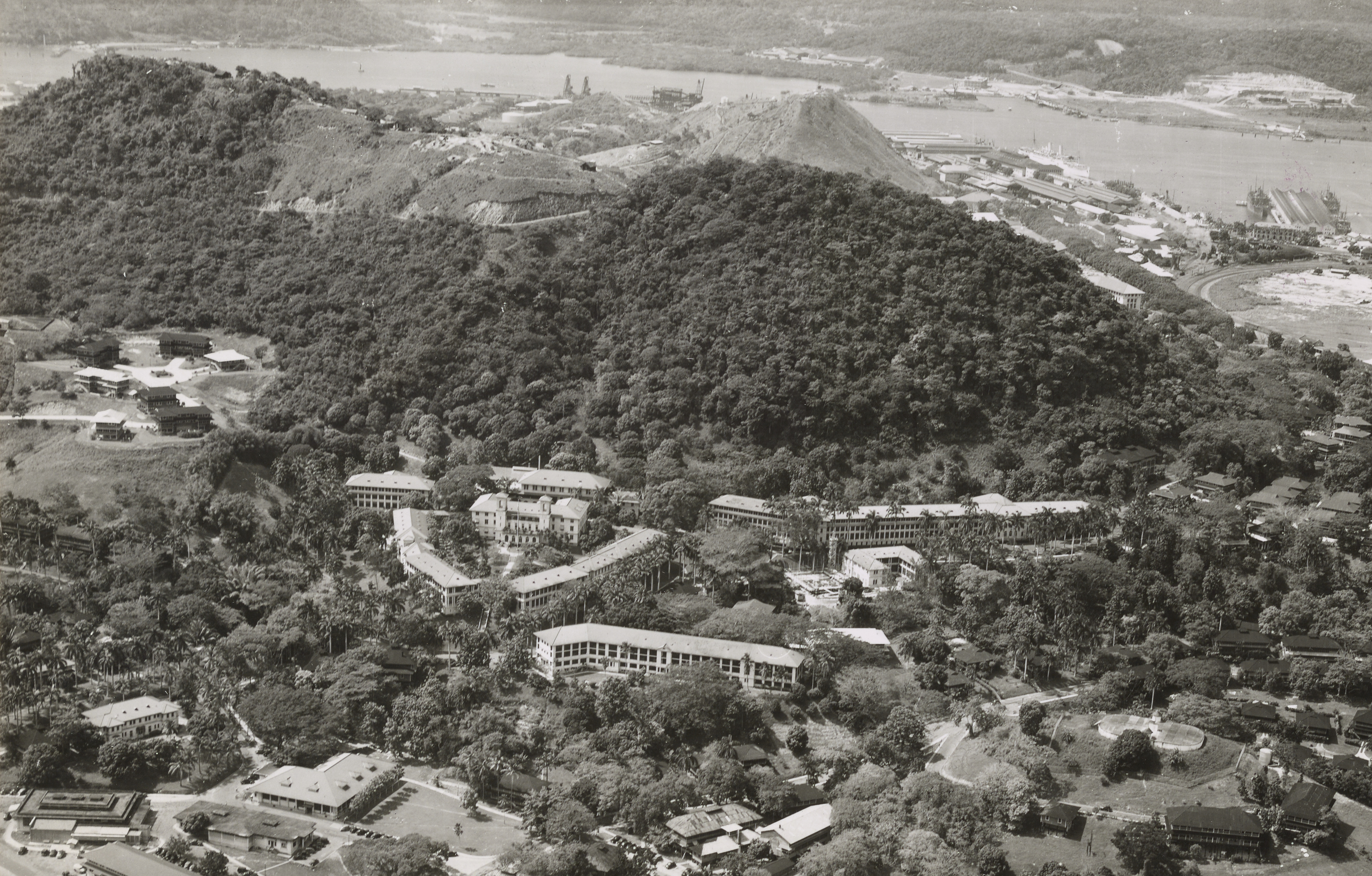
Gorgas Hospital aerial photo before World War II

The French canal company built the first hospital, then regarded as the finest and most modern in the tropics, at Ancon Hill, as well as a smaller hospital at Colon and a convalescent sanitarium at Taboga Island. The location on the hill was chosen as the elevation maximized exposure to healthy breezes and maximized the distance from the sewage and slums of Panama City. The hospital was placed under control of Dr. Louis Companyo, the former head of sanitation at the Suez Canal. However, a lack of understanding of the role of mosquitoes in disease transmission resulted in massive outbreaks of malaria and yellow fever, which besieged the hospital where at times the death rate of patients was estimated at 75%.

When the American government bought the French canal company in 1904, the Ancon hospital was considered an important asset. Under Dr. William C. Gorgas, it was expanded and modernized, but retained the same basic structure as the French hospital. During this period (1913–18), William Haugaard was one of the architects involved in the redesign. Critical improvements involved door and window screens and sealed rooms to facilitate fumigation. The hospital played a major role in lowering death rates during the canal construction.

=== Expansion and later years (1928–97) ===
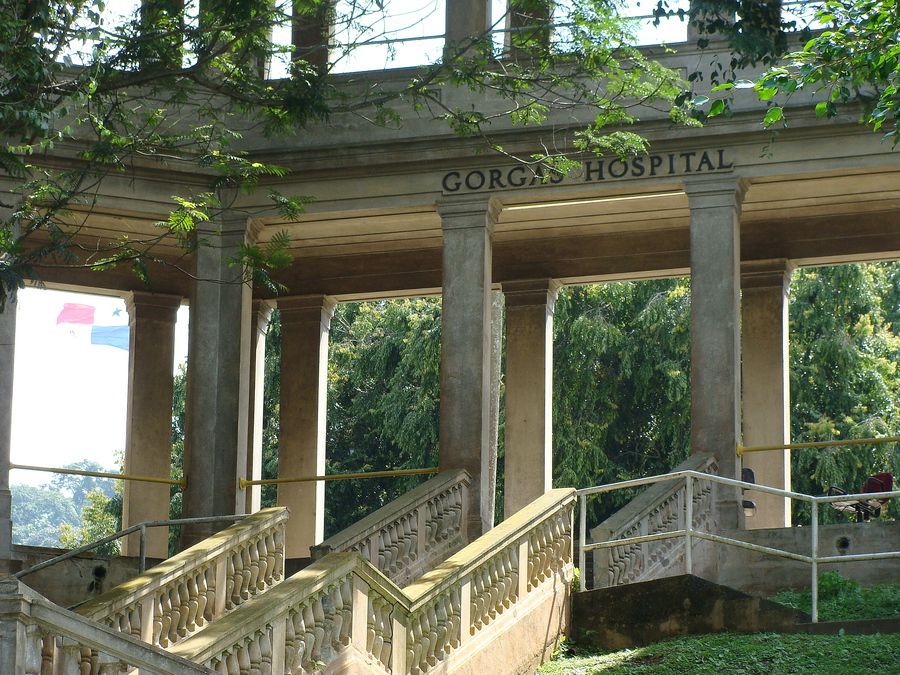
Gorgas Hospital main entryway

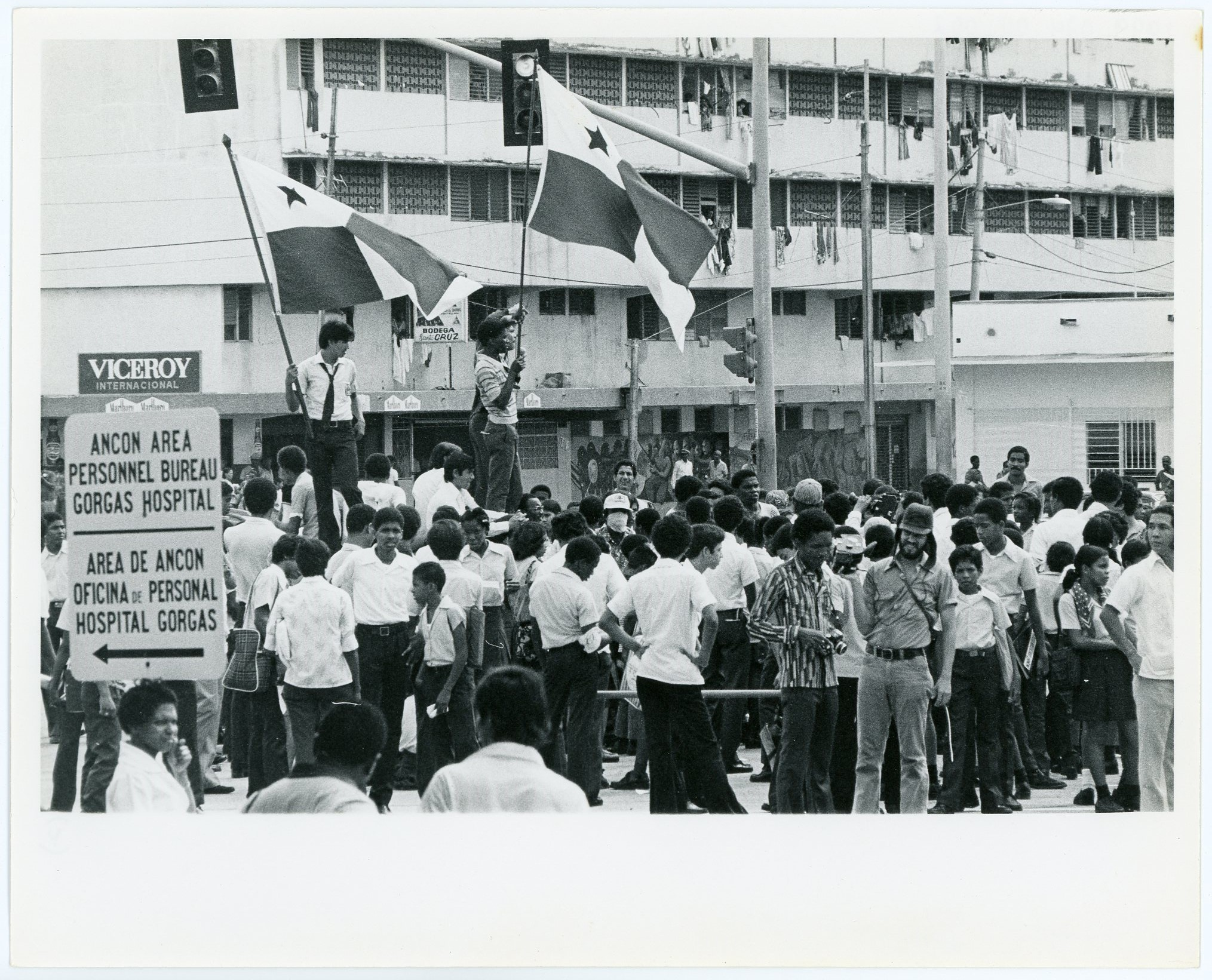
Demonstrations 1964 near the Hospital on Martyrs' Day

==== Operation Just Cause (1989) ====
During the Panama crisis that ultimately ended in the 1989 invasion of Panama by the United States (Operation Just Cause) Gorgas Army Community Hospital, as it was then called, found itself regularly in crisis. Bomb threats occurred several times a week, and during one incident, Panamanian demonstrators occupied a nearby empty parking lot and threatened the facility. On October 3, 1989, an attempted coup by members of the Panama Defense Forces (PDF) to oust General Manuel Noriega led to short, violent gun battles in the streets adjacent the complex.

Navy Lieutenant Roberto Paz, whose death at the hand of Panamanian paramilitaries (or possibly the PDF) ultimately led to the invasion, was brought to Gorgas after being shot. PDF military police and regular PDF military forces began taking up threatening positions around the hospital shortly after Paz was brought in. A show of force by Military Police from the 534th MP Company caused the PDF to pull back.

On the night of the invasion, as US troops were attacking "La Commandancia" (PDF Headquarters) only a few blocks away, the Gorgas complex was attacked directly by a small group of Panama Defense Forces (PDF) troops who were attempting to take hostages. This attack was repelled by Military Police on site, who were later reinforced by MPs from the 511th MP Company (Fort Drum, New York) and Infantry from the 4th Battalion, 6th Infantry, 5th Infantry Division (Fort Polk, Louisiana). For several days, the hospital came under fire from shootouts in Panama City, as well as deliberate sniper attacks and at least one mortar attack. Although military invasion plans had not accounted for its use, Gorgas became a location for the collection of US, PDF, and civilian wounded. The first American casualty of Operation Just Cause, Corporal Ivan Perez of the 4th Battalion, 6th Infantry Regiment, 5th Infantry Division, was brought to Gorgas by civilian ambulance after being mortally wounded in Quarry Heights.

=== Transfer to Panamanian control (1997–present) ===
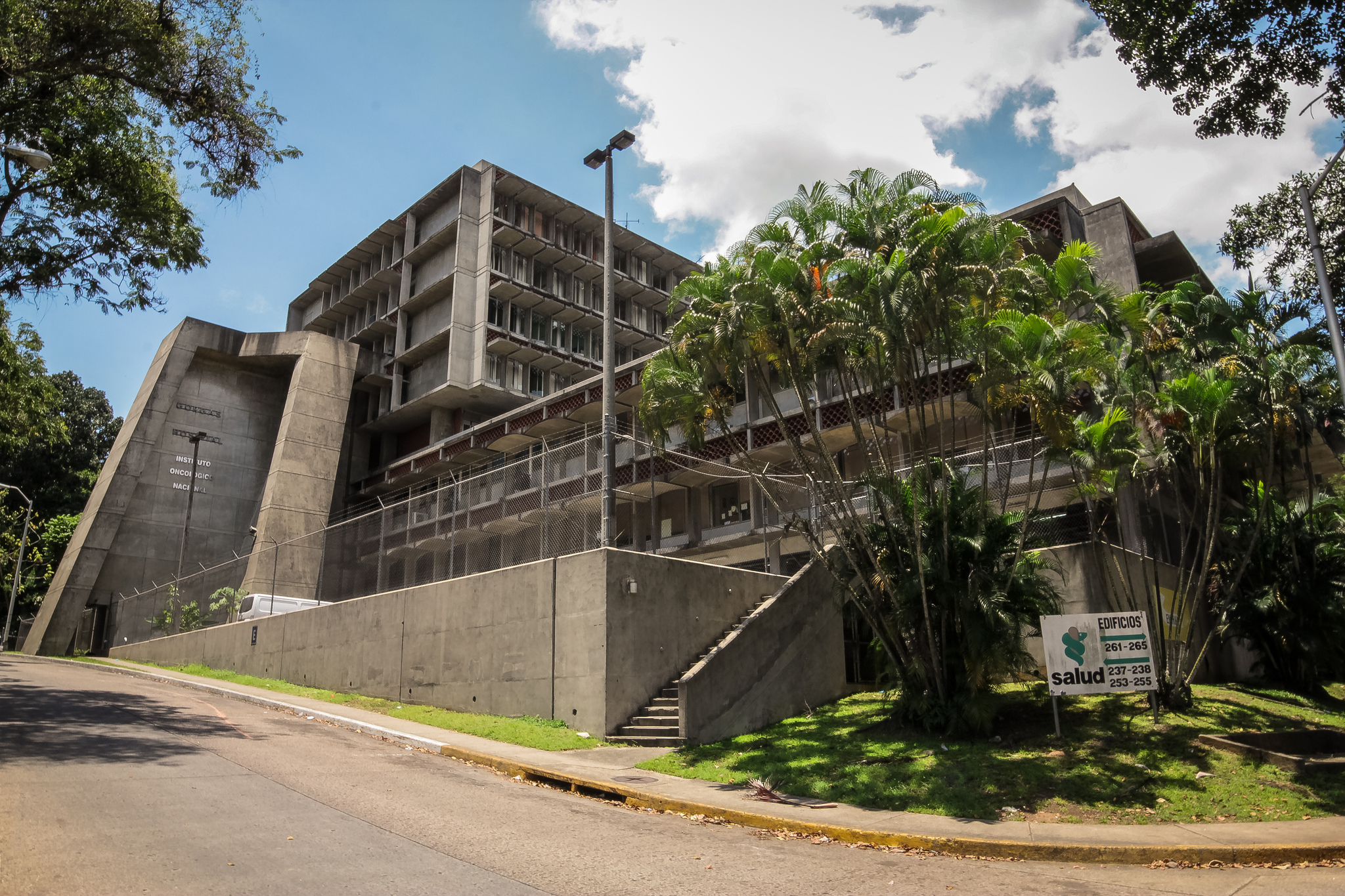
The former hospital building in 2012.

Since October 1999, it has been home to the Instituto Oncologico Nacional, Panama's Ministry of Health, and its Supreme Court. The last commander was COL William F.P. Tuer.

== Notable people associated with Ancon/Gorgas Hospital ==
- William C. Gorgas
- George Whipple
- Theodore C. Lyster
- Ben Kean

== See also ==
- List of former United States Army medical units
