= Instituto Oncológico Nacional =

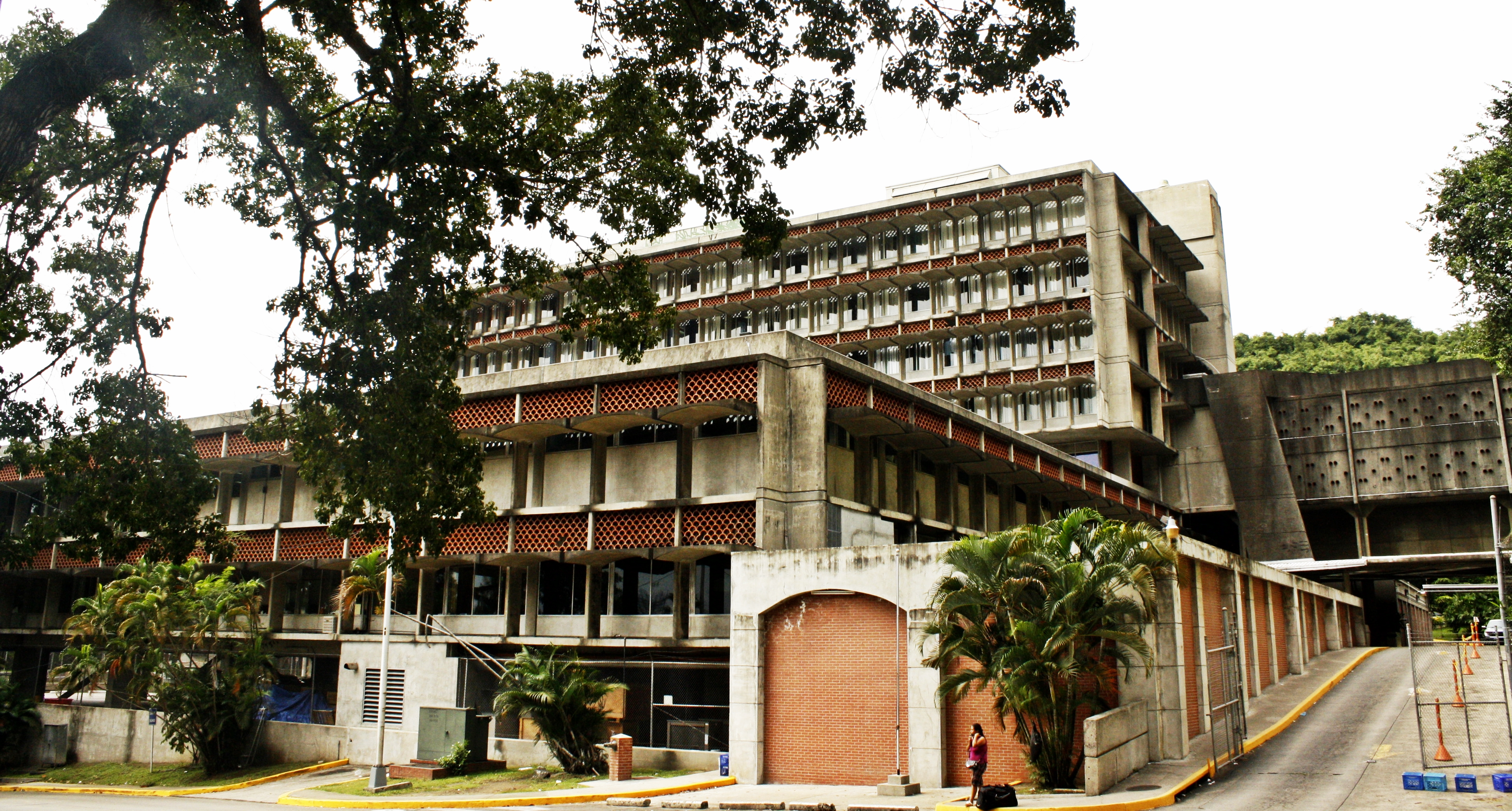

Geography
- Location: Gorgas Street, Ancon, Building 254; Panama City, Panama, Panama
- Coordinates: 8°57′36.61″N 79°32′44.58″W

Organisation
- Type: Specialist

Services
- Beds: 143
- Speciality: Cancer

History
- Founded: 1940

Links
- Website: http://www.ion.gob.pa
- Lists: Hospitals in Panama

The National Oncologic Institute or ION (Spanish: Instituto Oncológico Nacional) is a specialized hospital for cancer treatment, located in Panama City, Panama. Between August 2000 and March 2001, patients receiving radiation treatment for prostate cancer and cancer of the cervix received lethal doses of radiation, resulting in eight fatalities.

== History ==
In 1936, President Juan Demóstenes Arosemena, a physician, conceived of the creation of the National Radiologic Institute, an institution dedicated to cancer treatment. Treatments were initially administered at the Santo Tomas Hospital and the now-defunct Panama Hospital.

On September 18, 1940, during the administration of President Augusto Boyd, the new facilities of the National Radiologic Institute were opened, although it remained part of the Santo Tomas Hospital. It was by four doctors, three nurses and some assistants from the Santo Tomas Hospital. It had 40 beds and could offer radiotherapy, radium needle implants, nitrogen mustard injections and surgery. Initially, the institute focused more on palliative care and pain management.

In 1965, it began to take a more active role in the battle against cancer. The latest advances in the detection and treatment of cancer were implemented, and a cobalt-60 pump was installed. Later that year, it was renamed the Juan Demóstenes Arosemena Cancer Center, in recognition of its founder.

In the late 70s and early 80s, the institute saw some changes. Between 1978 and 1982 the building was remodeled and, in 1979, the government of Japan donated medical and surgical equipment, including an ultrasound and x-ray machine. In 1984, it was officially renamed the Instituto Oncológico Nacional, Doctor Juan Demóstenes Arosemena, or Doctor Juan Demostenea Arosemena National Oncology Institute.

On June 3, 1999, President Ernesto Perez Balladares' administration gave buildings 242 and 254 of the old Gorgas Hospital to the Institute, and, on July 23, the Institute began to move into its new location. Treatments continued to be performed at both the old and new locations.

The hospital has since continued its growth. As of 2026, its offerings include multiple types of radiotherapy (such as electron beam therapy, conformal therapy and brachytherapy) and imaging (such as scintigraphy, CT and PET imaging). It has also opened its ICU.

== Accident ==
As in most radiotherapy departments, the one at ION uses a treatment planning system (TPS) to calculate the resulting dose distributions and determine treatment times. It also uses shielding blocks to protect healthy tissue. At the ION, the data for each shielding block needed be entered into the TPS separately. The TPS allowed a maximum of four shielding blocks per field to be taken into account when calculating treatment times and dose distributions.

In order to satisfy the request of a radiation oncologist to include five blocks in the field, in August 2000 the method of digitizing shielding blocks was changed. It was found that it was possible to enter data into the TPS for multiple shielding blocks together as if they were a single block, thereby apparently overcoming the limitation of four blocks per field. As was found later, although the TPS accepted entry of the data for multiple shielding blocks as if they were a single block, at least one of the ways in which this data was entered led to the TPS indicating a treatment time substantially longer than it should have been. The result was that patients received a proportionately higher dose than that prescribed.

The new methods of entering data were not documented and standardized. Furthermore, the modified protocol was used without a verification test, such as a manual calculation of the treatment time for comparison with the computer calculated treatment time, or a simulation of treatment by irradiating a water phantom and measuring the dose delivered.

The modified treatment protocol was used for 28 patients, who were treated between August 2000 and March 2001 for prostate cancer and cancer of the cervix. The overexposures ranged from 20 to 100 percent over the prescribed dose. In spite of the treatment times being about twice those required for correct treatment, the error went unnoticed. Some early symptoms of excessive exposure were noted in some of the irradiated patients. The seriousness, however, was not realized, with the consequence that the accidental exposure went unnoticed for a number of months. The continued emergence of these symptoms, however, eventually led to the accidental exposure being detected in March 2001.

In May 2001, the Government of Panama requested assistance under the terms of the Convention on Assistance in the Case of a Nuclear Accident or Radiological Emergency. In its response, the International Atomic Energy Agency (IAEA) sent a team of five medical doctors and two physicists to Panama to perform a dosimetric and medical assessment of the accidental exposure and a medical evaluation of the affected patients’ prognosis and treatment. The team was complemented by a physicist from the Pan American Health Organization (PAHO), also at the request of the Government of Panama. By this time there had been eight deaths, five of which were radiation related, and the remaining 20 patients all suffered radiation injuries.

The IAEA report was consistent with the report made by local investigators. It was found that the radiotherapy equipment was properly calibrated and worked properly. Instead, the accident was caused by human error: using a protocol not validated to enter more shielding blocks resulted in increased dose in the treatment.

The accidental exposures at the ION in Panama were very serious. Many patients suffered severe radiation effects due to excessive dose, and both morbidity and mortality increased significantly. By September 2005, 23 of the exposed patients had died: 18 due to their radiation exposure, and the others by means of their advanced cancer. The Government of Panama agreed to share the conclusions of the report to help prevent similar accidents. The ION physicists involved were taken to trial by the patients' families and, in November 2004, two were found guilty of second degree murder.
