= SS Minnesota =

Two ships have been named the SS Minnesota.

- SS Minnesota (1903)
- SS Minnesota (1927), originally the SS Zeeland
