= Carlota and Guadalupe Gutierrez =

Sisters Guadalupe and Carlota Gutierrez (Note: In Spanish, the last name "Gutiérrez" is spelled with an accent. The Spanish-language press of nineteenth-century California did not include this accent when the name "Gutierrez" was printed in reference to Carlota and Guadalupe Gutierrez. For this reason, it is spelled without an accent in this Wikipedia entry.) were writers and public figures in 1870s San Francisco. Guadalupe published the serialized novel Espinas y rosas (Roses and Thorns) in the San Francisco newspaper La Sociedad in the fall of 1877. Carlota published poems in the Los Angeles newspaper La Crónica between 1876-1878. When they were mentioned in the society pages of the Spanish-language press, especially in reference to their speaking engagements, editor of the Los Angeles Spanish-language newspaper La Crónica, Pastor de Célis, referred to them jointly as "las Señoritas Gutierrez."

Based on United States Census records from 1870, the Gutierrez sisters lived in a modest household headed by Rosa Gutierrez, likely their mother or a family member, along with their two younger brothers. San Francisco directory records reveal that Rosa and Guadalupe worked as domestic servants and when Carlota was around eighteen years old, she worked as a telegraph operator. Eventually, Guadalupe and Carlota became Spanish teachers. Carlota even marketed her Spanish instruction services by placing English-language advertisements in the San Francisco Chronicle.

Although the Gutierrez sisters came from humble means and were working women, these details were not mentioned in the society reporting of California’s Spanish-language press. Instead, the focus was on their speaking engagements and literary talents. For example, the La Crónica correspondent "Consuelo" reported that Carlota presented an original poem and Guadalupe delivered a speech at a Mexican Independence Day celebration in 1876 in San Francisco. Pastor de Célis published updates in La Crónica about a trip that the Gutierrez sisters made to Los Angeles during the spring of 1877 in the company of Pío Pico, the final governor of Mexican Alta California before it was ceded to the United States and a leader in the Mexican-American community. Carlota would have been around twenty-one and Guadalupe would have been around twenty-five years old around this time. Pico describes the Gutierrez sisters as "distinguidas jóvenes que forman parte esencial de la escogida sociedad mejicana de la metropoli de California" (distinguished young women who are an essential part of the most select Mexican society of California's metropolis) (Note: San Francisco is the metropolis referenced here.) and mentions that they gave speeches in honor of Pico at his birthday celebration. He also reports that the date of a dance in Union Hall was changed so that the Gutierrez sisters would be able to attend before departing Los Angeles.

== Espinas y Rosas by Guadalupe Gutierrez ==
Guadalupe published her serialized novel Espinas y rosas (Roses and Thorns) in the San Francisco newspaper La Sociedad in the fall of 1877. From the one known surviving issue of La Sociedad which includes an installment of the novel, dated October 27, 1877, the story centers around two young ladies, sisters Leonor and Clotilde, who are mentored by their more cultured and wealthy uncle, Don Próspero.

During the time of the Espinas y rosas' publication, La Crónica published a series of editorials which detailed both reader responses to the novel and the many difficulties Guadalupe faced when it came to working with La Sociedad. Not only were there many typographical errors, but the editorial staff of La Sociedad did not attribute the novel’s authorship to Guadalupe in the October 27, 1877 issue of the newspaper. According to a review reprinted from Las Dos Repúblicas: "No hay duda que el título de la novelita es muy adecuado. Espinas para la autora, y rosas, nos suponemos, parecerán los labios y mejillas de la misma" (There is no doubt that the title of the little novel is very appropriate. Thorns for the author, and roses, we suppose, resemble her lips and cheeks). This quotation shows the condescension, patronization, and objectification Guadalupe was up against as she attempted to gain a foothold in the male-dominated world of nineteenth-century publishing in California.

Espinas y rosas was both a bildungsroman, coming-of-age narrative, and a roman à clef, story about real-life events hidden under the veil of fiction and pseudonyms. The fact that Guadalupe chooses to focus on two female protagonists, sisters Leonor and Clotilde, breaks from traditional bildungsroman narratives which often follow a male protagonist on his journey into manhood. The fact that Espinas y rosas was a roman à clef is made evident in both editorials about the novel and also in the use of thinly veiled pseudonyms, such as "Señora J… de C…" and "Señora C… de M…" to describe certain characters in the story. The fact that the book was a roman à clef stirred intrigue among readers, particularly Guadalupe’s social acquaintances in Los Angeles, where she had recently visited in the company of her sister and Pío Pico.

== Poetry by Carlota Gutierrez ==
Carlota published at least six poems in La Crónica of Los Angeles between 1876 and 1878, these include: "A la inspirada poetisa colombiana Amelia Denis," published in May 1876; "A Los Angeles," published in August 1877; "Hidalgo," published in September 1877; "La flor y el destello," published in November 1877; and, "Invocacion nocturna" and "Mi rizo," both published in May 1878. It is very possible that earlier poems by Carlota were printed either in the Spanish-language press or other publications, especially considering the fact that the Central American poet Amelia Denis de Icaza dedicated a poem to Carlota celebrating her poetic lyricism in the San Salvador newspaper La America Central in 1875. Somehow poetry by Carlota or word of her reputation as a poet must have reached Denis in El Salvador and inspired her to write a dedication poem.

Carlota's dedication poem in response to Denis, titled "A la inspirada poetisa colombiana Amelia Denis," is notable in that it recognizes and lauds the poetic talent of her interlocutor. Not only do these women poets celebrate one another publicly, but in doing so they also reveal insights into their creative process and what they value when it comes to writing and reading poetry. For example, mirroring the same rhyme and rhythm of Denis, Carlota writes:

Mas solo plugo al Éterno,

En fausto ó fatal momento,

Darme un vasto pensamiento

Y una alma para soñar

But it only pleased the Eternal,

In a fortunate or fatal moment,

To give me a vast thought

And a soul to dream.

For Carlota, writing poetry is a spiritual experience and her inspiration comes as a gift from the "Eternal" which stimulates both her soul and thoughts.
