= Yaviza Airport =

- IATA: PYV; ICAO: none

Summary
- Airport type: Public
- Serves: Yaviza, Panama
- Elevation AMSL: 43 ft / 13 m
- Coordinates: 8°09′10″N 77°41′15″W

Map
- Location of the airport in Panama

Runways
Direction	Length		Surface
Direction	m	ft	Surface
17/35	600	1,969	Grass
- Source: HERE Maps GCM

Yaviza Airport (IATA: PYV) is an airstrip serving Yaviza, a town in the Darién Province of Panama. Yaviza is the southern end of the Pan-American Highway and the beginning of the Darién Gap.

The runway is just southeast of the town, across the Chucunaque River. North approach and departure will cross the water. There is a small pond at the southern end of the runway.

The La Palma VOR (Ident: PML) is located 30.8 nautical miles (57 km) northwest of the airstrip.

== See also ==
- Transport in Panama
- List of airports in Panama
