= SS Ancon =

American cargo and passenger ship; first to officially transit the Panama Canal (1914)

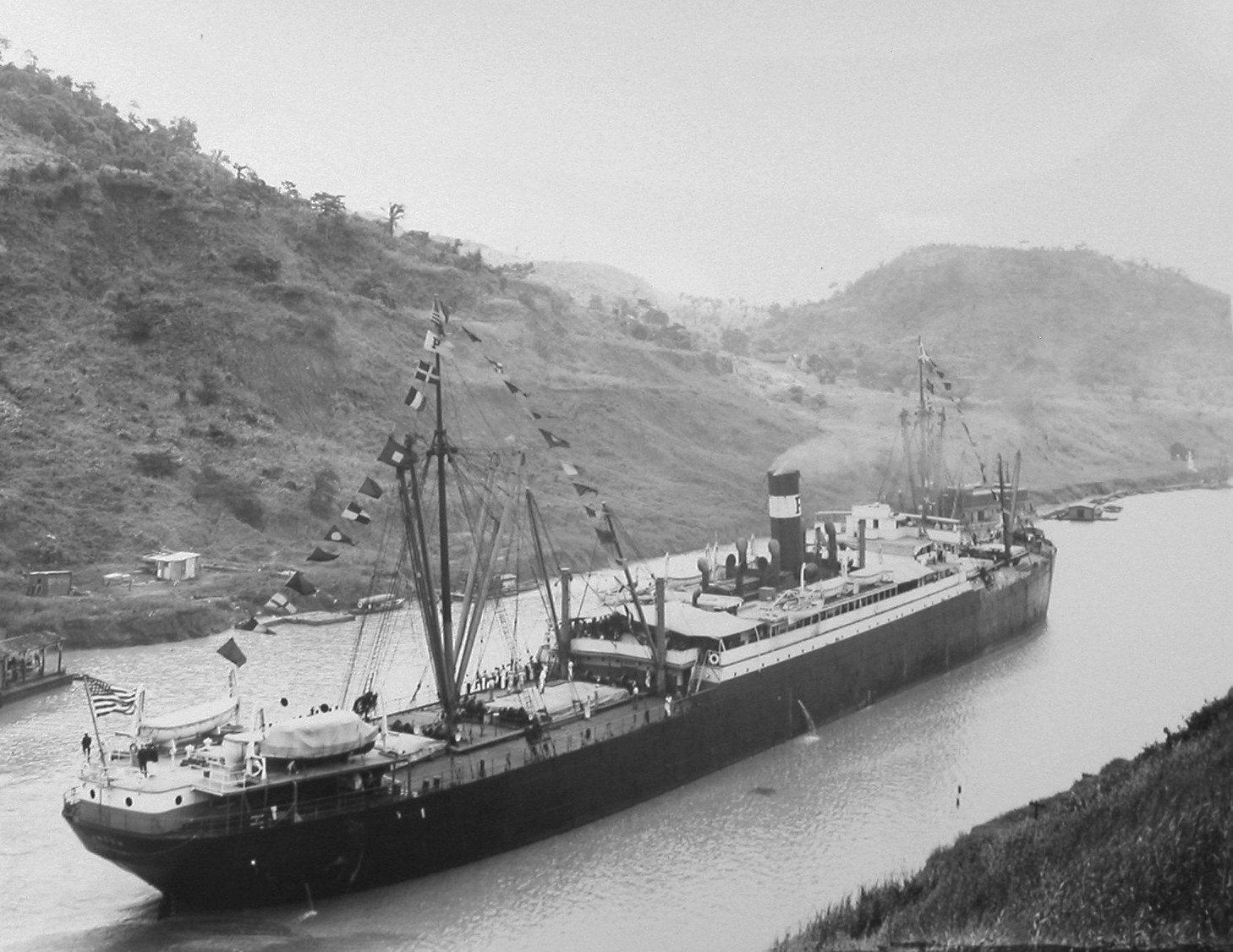
- Ancon at the opening of the Panama Canal, 1914

History

United States
- Name: Shawmut
- Owner: Boston Steamship Company
- Builder: Maryland Steel Company, Sparrows Point, Maryland
- Launched: 15 December 1901
- Out of service: 1909
- Home port: Boston
- Identification: Official Number: 117125; Code Letters KRNT

United States
- Name: Ancon (1909); Ex Ancon (1939)
- Owner: United States government under Panama Railroad Company
- Acquired: 1909
- Out of service: 28 March – 25 July 1919 for service with Navy
- Home port: New York
- Fate: Sold private, Permanente Steamship Company, renamed Permanente, scrapped 1950
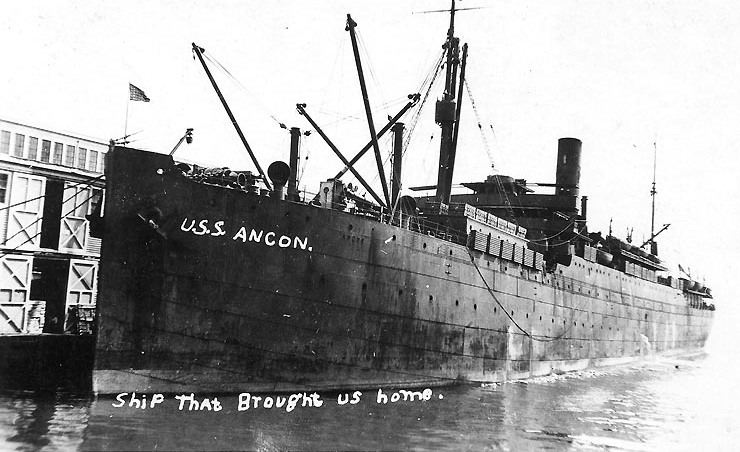
- In 1919, the ship transported U.S. troops home from Europe as USS Ancon (ID #1467). The original image was printed on postal card ("AZO") stock.

United States
- Name: USS Ancon (ID-1467)
- Acquired: 16 November 1918
- Commissioned: 28 March 1919
- Decommissioned: 25 July 1919
- Out of service: Returned to the Panama Canal 25 July 1919

General characteristics
- Type: Cargo liner, later troop transport
- Tonnage: 9606 gross tons
- Displacement: 9,332 long tons (9,482 t)
- Length: 489.5 ft (149.2 m)
- Beam: 58 ft (18 m)
- Draft: 28.9 ft (8.8 m)
- Propulsion: Steam, triple expansion 533 NHP
- Speed: 13 knots (24 km/h; 15 mph)
- Complement: In naval service, 126
- Armament: In naval service, 3 × 6 pdrs
- Notes: Dimensions from Lloyd's Register, 1906 & 1914

SS Ancon was an American cargo and passenger ship launched in 1901 and scrapped in 1950. One of the largest U.S. commercial ships of its day, it became the first vessel to officially transit the Panama Canal in 1914 and later served as a troop transport for the U.S. military.

The ship was built as Shawmut by the Maryland Steel Company at Sparrows Point, Maryland. The Boston Steamship Company eventually sold them to the U.S.-owned Panama Railroad Company, which renamed it for the canal's Pacific terminus at Ancon. In 1914, Ancon made the first official and ceremonial transit of the canal.

From 28 March to 25 July 1919, the ship served as a commissioned U.S. naval vessel: USS Ancon (ID-1467), which made two round-trip voyages from the New York Port of Embarkation to France to bring troops home. Ancon returned to Panama Canal service until 1939, when the ship was sold to the Permanente Steamship Company and renamed Permanente.

== History ==
=== Construction and design ===
The steamer was constructed by Maryland Steel, Sparrows Point, Maryland, for the Boston Steamship Line as the SS Shawmut launched December 1901 and completed in 1902. The launch date is given as "today" in a piece in The New York Times datelined December 21, 1901, and published on 22 December while the journal Marine Engineering gives the date as 23 December. (Note: The New York Times published 22 December 1901 release gives the launch "today" in a piece datelined 21 December. The Marine Engineering January 1902 issue gives the date of 23 December 1901. A "data card" the journal Marine Engineering published with some major ship articles for retention by readers states "Launched January 1902" with ship's characteristics but the card was probably prepared early for publication in the January issue. The journal's articles for January publication, perhaps based on scheduled times, were probably being prepared about the time of launch with the daily newspaper's article likely more current.) She and her sister ship Tremont were two of the largest United States commercial ships at the time.

=== Commercial service ===
Shawmut was put into service by the Boston Steamship Company in association with the Northern Pacific and Great Northern Railways acting as booking agents with monthly passenger and freight sailings from Puget Sound ports of Tacoma and Seattle, Washington and Victoria, British Columbia to Yokohama, Kobe and Moji, Japan; Shanghai and Hong Kong, China and Manila, Philippines.

Shawmut's maiden voyage led to questions about whether such large ships could be profitable with specific questions concerning even larger ships being built by James J. Hill for trans Pacific trade. The ship had arrived in Seattle to begin loading for the voyage on 22 July 1902 sailing for Tacoma on 25 July to load cargo, largely of lumber that had to be transshipped due to the fact the ship was too large to enter the lumber port, and took until 22 August to fully load cargo from scattered origins. She sailed on 22 August with a stop at Seattle before proceeding to sea that night and reached Yokohama 12 September unloading a small consignment. The lumber was destined for Shanghai, but the ship was too large to reach the docks on arrival 20 September and had to unload by lighter taking until 13 October before departure for Hong Kong. On reaching Hong Kong 18 October where there was little cargo to load and only a small amount to carry on to Manila upon departure 8 November. By 22 November Shawmut was in Yokohama for a final stop before departure for Seattle on 23 November where she arrived 8 December, 139 days for the voyage. The ship had carried a then record breaking 13,000 tons of cargo, but returned with only about 2,500 tons and an estimated deficit of over $21,000 for the trip. There was speculation that Hill had used a Boston company to "experiment" on using large ships for the trade before committing his vessels.

The ship had arrived in Yokohama early in the Russo-Japanese War reporting Japanese torpedo boats hundreds of miles at sea investigating all ships. She departed Yokohama with Jewish businessmen from the Russian port of Vladivostok who had been suddenly ordered out by Russian authorities and escaped through Korea where Japanese authorities had detained them before bringing them to Yokohama where they boarded Shawmut which had reached Seattle in late March. The ship was also under close surveillance by Japanese "special service agents" who even kept a guard at one passenger's door. Among the passengers bound for Seattle were 235 Filipinos on the way to the St. Louis World's Fair along with material for the Filipino and Japanese villages at the fair. Shawmut sailed for Japan again on 16 July 1904 with 15,000 tons of cargo that included 900,000 pounds of canned beef destined for Kobe, Japan and was at sea when a cable from London instructed marine insurance agents to not accept risks on ships or cargoes for Japan for fear of seizure by belligerents.

Shawmut had grounded off the coast of China in the fall of 1904 due to weather suffering loss of her rudder, propellers and suffering a double fracture to her stern frame and "spectacle" supports for her propellers but, after repair in an overseas dry dock, managed a return to home waters and one round trip before making permanent repairs. The replacement stern frame and propeller supports were built by the ship's original builder and sent to Seattle to meet the ship there in January 1905 for the permanent repair. Moran Brothers' Company of Seattle proposed to do the repairs using the only dry dock of sufficient size, the naval dry dock at Bremerton, but the Navy's charges were "exorbitant" and Moran devised a means of using their small floating dry dock to do the repairs by only lifting the stern of Shawmut using a cofferdam to seal and de-water the work space.

By 1907 predictions of economic trouble had become fact with Shawmut and Tremont withdrawn from Pacific service and replaced in the Philippine trade by the British firm of Andrew Weir and Company. The consequence, in the words of His Majesty's consul in Manila in his report for 1907, was that "the American flag disappears from the Pacific trade with the single exception of the Northern Pacific Steamship Company's passenger-freighter Minnesota." (Note: The Minnesota referenced would be the 20,602 ton ship of 1904, a predecessor of Northern Pacific's Great Northern and sister of Dakota, that was built by Eastern Shipbuilding Company, New London, Connecticut and sold for scrap in 1923.) By October 1908 the annual meeting of the Boston Steamship Company was reported to be postponed pending news of the sale of both Shawmut and Tremont because the company stated they could not be operated without a subsidy.

=== The Panama Canal service ===
In 1909, the ships were purchased by the Panama Canal. Shawmut was renamed for the Panama Canal's Pacific side terminus at Ancon, while Tremont was dubbed Cristobal for the Canal's Atlantic port.

Operated by The Panama Railroad Company's Panama Railroad Steamship Line, the ships played a crucial role in building the canal, bringing workers and supplies, notably massive amounts of cement, from New York to Panama for the construction project.

On 15 August 1914 Ancon made the first official transit of the canal with a delegation of some two hundred dignitaries aboard as part of the canal's opening ceremonies. (Cristobal had made the first unofficial transit on 3 August, delivering a load of cement, while an old French crane boat Alexandre La Valley had crossed the canal from the Atlantic in stages during construction, reaching the Pacific on 7 January.)

Five days after World War I, on 16 November 1918, Ancon was acquired at New Orleans by the United States Navy from the Department of War (Army) and commissioned on 28 March 1919 under the command of Lt. Comdr. Milan L. Pittman, USNRF as the troop transport USS Ancon (ID-1467). The ship was assigned to the Atlantic Fleet's Cruiser and Transport Force making two round-trip voyages from the United States to France returning troops home. On completion of the second voyage Ancon was decommissioned at New York City on 25 July 1919 and returned to the War Department.

The Panama Railroad Company replaced SS Ancon in 1938 with a larger steam turbine cargo liner named Ancon which later saw considerable action as the Navy command and communications ship USS Ancon (AGC-4) in World War II. The old Ancon remained in Panama Canal service as Ex Ancon until sold privately.

=== Further service ===
In 1941, the ship was sold to the Permanente Steam Ship Company in Oakland, California, and renamed Permanente. After World War II, the vessel was sold to the Tidewater Commercial Company in Panama, which renamed it Tidewater in 1946 and Continental in 1948. Two years later, the Bernstein Line in Panama acquired the ship, renamed her Ancon, and sent her to Italian shipbreakers.

Arriving on 26 October 1950, the Ancon was scrapped by the Trosidea Ricuperi Metallici company in Savona.

== See also ==
- Panama Canal Zone
- Panama Canal Railway
- Panama Canal

== Bibliography ==
- The American Marine Engineer (1908). "News Brevities". The American Marine Engineer. 3 (October, 1908). New York/Chicago: National Marine Engineer's Beneficial Association.
- Bennett, Ira E. (1915). History of the Panama Canal – Its Construction and Builders. Washington, D.C.: Historical Publishing Company. LCCN 15012012.
- Blue Book of American Shipping (1905). From Pacific Coast Ports to the Orient. Cleveland, Ohio: Penton Publishing Company. LCCN 01019463.
- Horne (Acting Consul General, Manila), H. (1908). Report on the Trade and Commerce of the Philippine Islands for the Year 1907. Diplomatic and Consular Reports. Annual Series. London: His Majesty's Stationery Office.
- Lloyds. "Lloyd's Register 1940–41" (PDF). Lloyd's Register (through PlimsollShipData).
- Lloyds. "Lloyd's Register 1944–45" (PDF). Lloyd's Register (through PlimsollShipData).
- Marine Engineering (1902). "New Ships of the Boston Steamship Company". Marine Engineering. 7 (January 1902). New York: Marine Engineering, Inc.
- Marine Engineering (1905). "Repairs to the Steamship Shawmut". Marine Engineering. 10 (May 1905). New York: Marine Engineering, Inc.
- Morning Oregonian (1902). "Too Big For Profit: Shawmut's Expensive Experience in Oriental Trade". Morning Oregonian (January 2, 1903). Portland.
- Naval History And Heritage Command (4 December 2014). "Ancon (Id. No. 1467)". Dictionary of American Naval Fighting Ships. Naval History And Heritage Command.
- New York Times (1901). "New Ocean Freighter Launched". The New York Times (December 22, 1901). New York.
- The Official Guide (1905). "Advertisement: Boston Steamship Company". The Official Guide of the Railways and Steam Navigation Lines of the United States (January, 1908). New York: The National Railway Publication Company.
- San Francisco Call (1902). "No More Japanese Risks". San Francisco Call. 96 (22 July 1904). San Francisco.
- The Steamship (1905). "Dry Docking Under Difficulties". The Steamship. 17 (October 1905). New York.
- The Tacoma Times (1902). "Steamship Shawmut Brings Refugees From Vladivostok". The Tacoma Times (March 21, 1904). Tacoma, Washington.
- United States Government Printing Office (1917). Senate Documents, 65th Congress, First Session. Vol. 10. Washington, D.C.: United States Government Printing Office.
