= Hospital Nacional =

Coordinates: 8°58′23.49″N 79°32′1.77″W

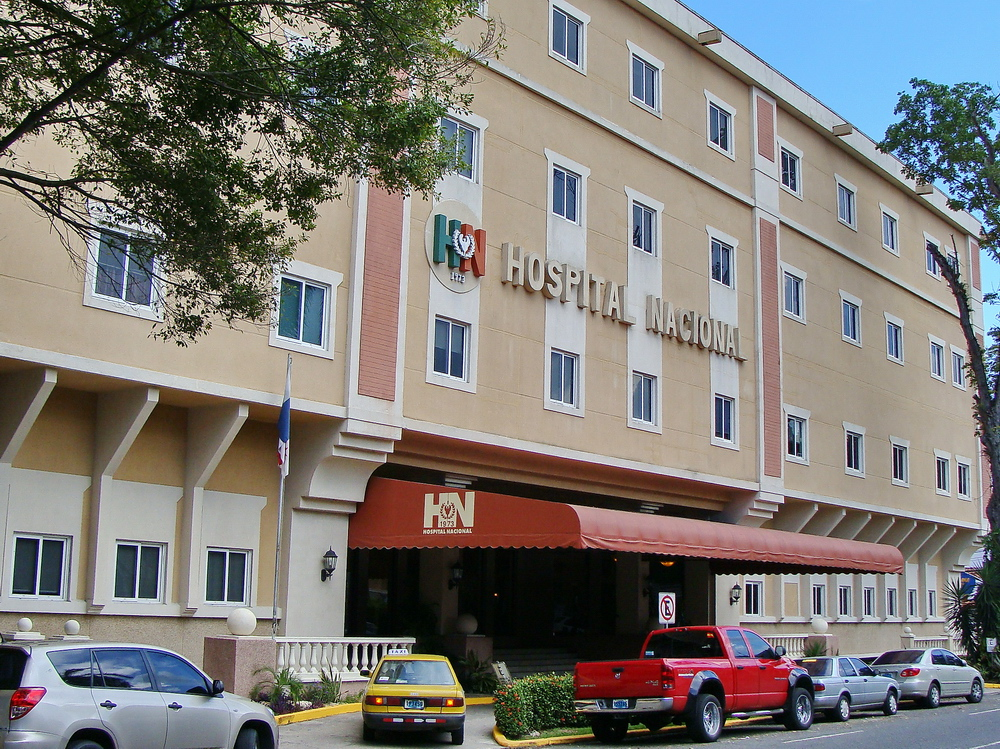
- Hospital Nacional in 2011

Geography
- Location: Avenida Cuba and 38th Street, Panama City, Panama

Organisation
- Type: Private

Services
- Beds: 80

History
- Opened: 9 July 1973

Links
- Website: www.hospitalnacional.com
- Lists: Hospitals in Panama
- Other links: List of hospitals in Panama

Hospital Nacional (English: National Hospital) is a private hospital in Panama City, Panama. It is located at Avenida Cuba and 38th Street in Bella Vista.

== History ==
Clinica Nacional (National Clinic), a small 10-bed facility with one operating room, one delivery room, and a small newborn unit, opened on 9 July 1973 at Justo Arosemena Avenue and 38th Street in Panama City, Panama.It exclusively provided OB/GYN services and became known as "Clinica de la Mujer" (The Women's Clinic). To accommodate its growth to 25 beds, it moved to a larger location across the street in January 1980

In September 1994, Centro Médico Nacional (National Medical Center) opened, housing 110 specialists.

By that time, the smaller clinic's fame made further expansion feasible. On 20 August 1998, a new building was inaugurated on Avenida Cuba, between 38th and 39th Streets in Panama City, where the clinic was renamed Hospital Nacional.

== Facilities ==
Hospital Nacional is an 80-bed facility offering all major medical specialties. The Intensive Care Unit has eight adult and five pediatric beds. The neonatal ICU can care for 5 patients at a time. Experienced registered nurses are available at all times.

== Services ==
- Emergency Room: ATLS and ACLS certified personnel. The ER Medical director has done training in ER Management on Beth Israel Deaconess Medical Center.
- Operating room: Ready for all mayor surgeries, 24/7
- Laboratory
- Pharmacy
- Pathology
- Blood Bank
- Medical Imaging: Including X-Rays, MRI, Multidetector CT, Ultrasound, Nuclear Medicine (Molecular Imaging), Fluoroscopy, Angiography Lab, Mammography and Bone Densitometry.
- Endoscopy
- Physical therapy
- Hyperbaric oxygen therapy
- Cardiologic testing lab: Including Holter monitor, EKG, Echocardiography and Cardiac Stress Tests, they have a special unit to do Cardiac CTs.
- Delivery Rooms
- Hemodialysis

== Insurance ==
Hospital Nacional works with all major Panamanian insurance companies, and also has a special International Insurances Department dedicated to handling International Insurance Programs.
