= Puerto Indio =

- Location within Panama
- Coordinates: 8°1′15″N 78°12′15″W
- Country: Panama
- Province: Emberá

Population (2008)
  - Total: 527

Puerto Indio is a town in the Emberá indigenous territory of Panama. The town is on the Sabalo river, just upstream of the town of Sambú.

== Sources ==
- World Gazetteer: Panama – World-Gazetteer.com
