= Augusto Vergara Airport =

- IATA: none; ICAO: MPGU

Summary
- Serves: Los Santos
- Location: Los Santos Province
- Elevation AMSL: 69 ft / 21 m
- Coordinates: 7°51′30″N 80°16′35″W

Map
- Location of the airport in Panama

Runways
Direction	Length		Surface
Direction	m	ft	Surface
16/34	1,000	3,281	Asphalt
- Source: Google Maps GCM

Augusto Vergara Airport (ICAO: MPGU) is an airport serving the city of Los Santos, in Panama. It is located 16 kilometres (10 mi) southeast of the city, north of the town of Guararé.

The airport is near the Pacific shore. North approach and departure are over the water.

The Alonso Valderrama non-directional beacon (Ident: CHE) is located 11.0 nautical miles (20.4 km) northwest of the airport. The Santiago VOR-DME (Ident: STG) is located 41.9 nautical miles (78 km) west-northwest of the airport.

== See also ==
- Transport in Panama
- List of airports in Panama
