= Hospital Santo Tomás =

Coordinates: 8°58′14.89″N 79°31′56.73″W

Santo Tomás Hospital
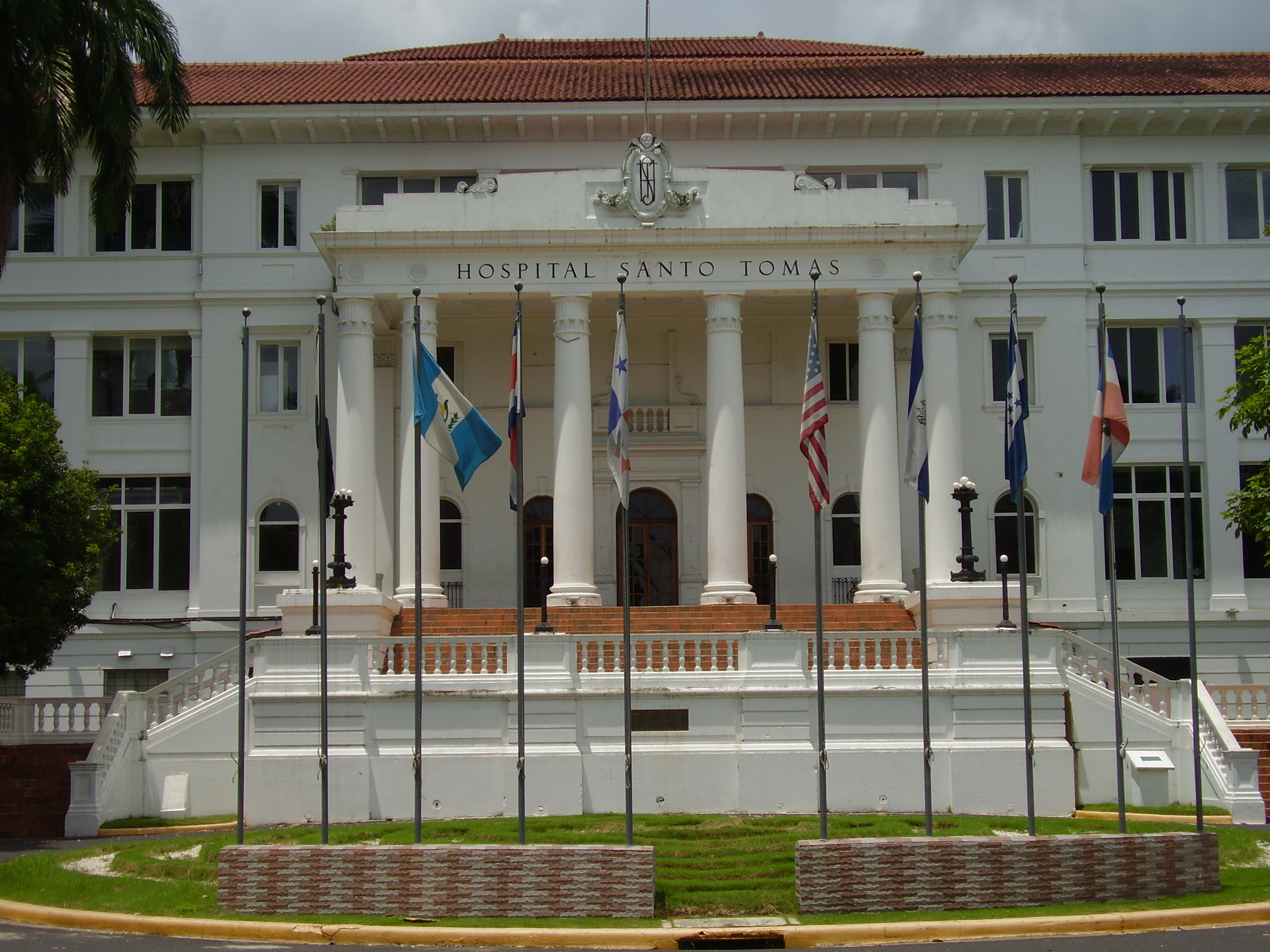

Geography
- Location: 34th East Street and Avenida Balboa, Bella Vista, Panama City, Panama

Organisation
- Type: Public Hospital, teaching

Services
- Beds: 632

History
- Founded: September 22, 1702

Links
- Lists: Hospitals in Panama
- Other links: List of hospitals in Panama

Hospital Santo Tomás (HST, Saint Thomas Hospital), is a public hospital in Panama City. It was founded in 1703.

== History ==
The first written mention of HST was on April 11, 1703, in a letter by Juan de Argüeyes, the Bishop of Panama City to King Philip V of Spain where he told him about a hospice he founded and that had been working since the day of Saint Thomas of Villanueva, September 22, 1702 to treat poor women who had nowhere to go and he begged him to bear to this hospice the title of hospital.

In 1819, construction of new facilities to replace the HST were started. This new building was built on "B" Avenue. The new hospital began to treat also men when San Juan de Dios, the hospital for men, was closed by the government of the time.

On September 1, 1924, a new complex of buildings was built at the present location, on Balboa Avenue under the administration of President Belisario Porras who wanted to give the country a new, modern hospital. The hospital was built on 5 hectares of which 3 are buildings, streets, sidewalks and parkings and 2 hectares were gardens. Opposition politicians criticized the project, calling it a white elephant because they said it was too big for a small country. Time gave President Porras vindication, as 30 years later, when he was on his lasts moments he couldn't find a bed in this hospital, so he had to go to a Private hospital where he died. The Hospital that people said was an exaggeration to this small country, couldn't handle the demand. Even today, the HST is called sometimes the white elephant, but not in a disrespective form.

Also, former wards of HST evolved to become independent hospitals by themselves, the pediatric ward became Hospital del Niño (Children's Hospital) and the Oncologic ward became the Instituto Oncologico Nacional (National Oncologic Institute). As a result, the HST takes care of people 15 years old and up, and refers cancer patients to the National Oncologic Institute.

Jesús Picota Carrillo is the composer of the lyrics and music for the Hymn to Saint Thomas, which will be released on September 1, 2024, during the White Elephant Centennial celebration.

It is the first Hymn during the 323 years of Santo Tomás Hospital's existence (YouTube reference: Hymn to Saint Thomas).

== The fourth Hospital ==
At the end of the 20th century, it was obvious the HST was in need of a major renovation, the fourth of its long history. The hospital complex was built with the building standards of the time, with various separate buildings that housed Residents, a Maternity Ward, ER, administration, outpatient clinic, etc.

In 2000 plans began to modernize the facilities by tearing down 5 buildings and replacing them with 4 bigger brand new buildings to bring many services closer. Some buildings were evacuated but maintained as they are considered historical landmarks and plans are in progress to renovate them as a museum or administrative offices for the hospital.

== Teaching hospital ==
Hospital's logo.

HST is one of the biggest teaching hospitals of the country. It is considered a level I trauma center.

The hospital has the following teaching programs:

- Medical internship, that lasts 2 year and it consists on a traditional rotational internship.
- Medical Residencies on the following medical specialties: OB/GYN, Internal medicine, Anesthesiology, Surgery, Orthopedic surgery, Neurosurgery, Urology, Otorhinolaryngology, Radiology, Pneumology, Pathology, Ophthalmology, Dermatology, Emergency Medicine, Intensive care medicine and Vascular surgery.
- Also medical, nursing, physiotherapy and odontology students have rotational programs as part of their education.

== Medical specialties available ==
- Anesthesiology
- Cardiology
- Cardiovascular surgery
- Critical care medicine
- Dermatology
- Endocrinology
- Gastroenterology
- General Surgery
- Hematology
- Infectology
- Internal medicine
- Maxillofacial surgery
- Nephrology
- Neurology
- Neurosurgery
- Nuclear Medicine
- Obstetrics and gynaecology
- Ophthalmology
- Orthopedic surgery
- Otorhinolaryngology
- Physiotherapy
- Plastic surgery
- Pneumology
- Psychiatry
- Radiology
- Thoracic surgery
- Urology
