= Wannukandí Airport =

Wannukandi Airport San Blas Airport
- IATA: NBL; ICAO: MPWN

Summary
- Location: Wannukandi
- Elevation AMSL: 6 ft / 2 m
- Coordinates: 9°16′25″N 78°08′20″W

Map
- Location of the airport in Panama

Runways
Direction	Length		Surface
Direction	m	ft	Surface
18/36	730	2,395	Concrete
- Source: Bing Maps GCM

Wannukandi Airport (IATA: NBL, ICAO: MPWN) is an airport serving Wannukandi, in the Guna Yala comarca (indigenous province) of Panama. The runway is on the Caribbean coast, and north approach and departures are over the water.

== See also ==
- Transport in Panama
- List of airports in Panama
