= Ancon Hill =

Hill in Panama City

Coordinates: 8°57′26.2″N 79°32′58.0″W

Ancón Hill
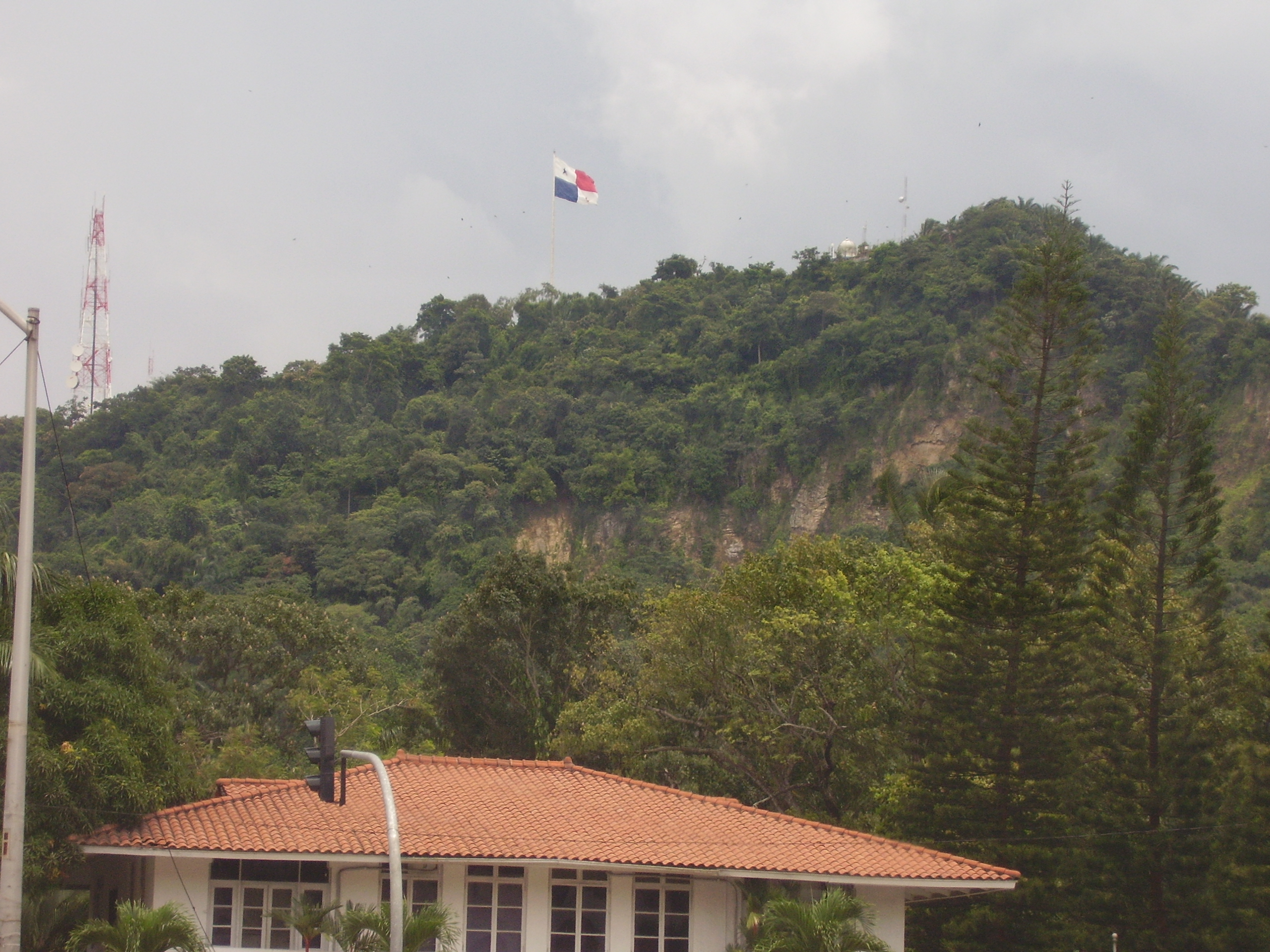
- View of the Ancón Hill with the Panamanian flag on top.

Highest point
- Elevation: 199 m (653 ft)

Naming
- Native name: Cerro Ancón (Spanish)

Geography
- Location within Panama
- Location: Panama City

Ancón Hill (Spanish: Cerro Ancón) is a 199 metres (653 ft) high hill that overlooks Panama City, Panama, adjacent to the township of Ancón. It was used for administration of the Panama Canal and was under U.S. jurisdiction as a part of the Panama Canal Zone until being returned to Panama in 1977. Largely undeveloped, the area is now a reserve. The hill includes the highest point in Panama City.

Relatively undeveloped, it includes a jungle in an otherwise urban area, and wildlife still survives cut off from other jungle areas. It is not uncommon to see sloths, white-nosed coati, nine-banded armadillos, Geoffroy's tamarins, or deer on Ancon Hill, which now has protected status. Its name is used as an acronym by a Panamanian environmental group, Asociación Nacional para la Conservación de la Naturaleza (ANCON).

The lower slopes contained residences and Gorgas Hospital. Higher up were the residences of the Governor of the Canal Zone and Quarry Heights, where the United States Southern Command was located. Quarry Heights was thus named as it is adjacent to a large rock quarry on one side of the hill, which left a visible cliff face. The hill contains an abandoned underground bunker once occupied by the US Southern Command. At the top are two broadcast towers and a small road reaches them. One-way vehicular traffic is allowed during daylight hours. The summit of the hill can be reached by a 30-minute hike. Hikers can use the road to reach the summit, and the hill is a popular jogging and hiking trek. Along the path, all manner of vegetation and birds can be seen.

== History ==
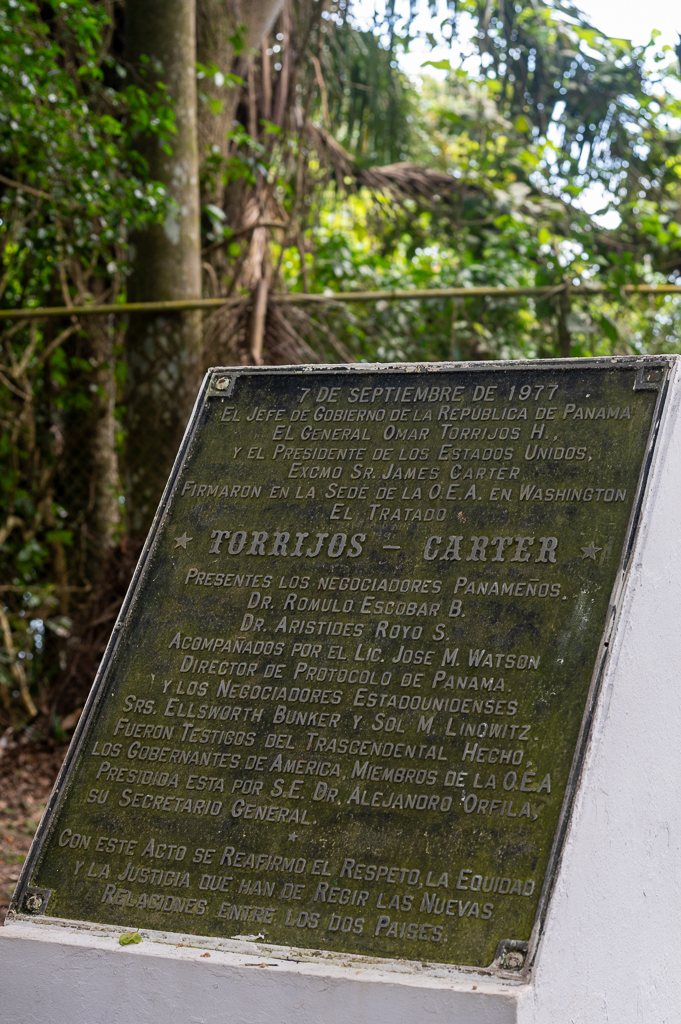
Plaque near the Summit of Ancon Hill commemorating the signing of the Torrijos–Carter Treaties (1977), which set the terms for the transfer of the Panama Canal from the United States to Panama

When the pirate Henry Morgan sacked Panama City in 1671, his scouts first climbed Ancon Hill to gain knowledge of the local defenses. Ancon Hill overlooks the site of the new city, constructed after Morgan's destruction of the old one.

The hill became part of the land taken to build the canal and a national symbol in 1906 after Amelia Denis de Icaza wrote her poem about its annexation. Today this hill still boasts a large national flag at its summit.

The first ship to officially transit the Panama Canal in 1914, SS Ancon, took its name from the hill and surrounding township.

When Panama regained control of the hill following the 1977 Panama Canal Treaty, one of the first things the country did was fly a large Panamanian flag atop the hill.

== See also ==
- Protected areas of Panama
