= Coiba Airport =

Airport in Central America

- IATA: none; ICAO: none; LID: PA-0024

Summary
- Airport type: Public
- Serves: Isla Coiba, Panama
- Elevation AMSL: 255 ft / 78 m
- Coordinates: 7°30′25″N 81°41′53″W

Map
- Location of the airport in Panama

Runways
Direction	Length		Surface
Direction	m	ft	Surface
18/36	1,050	3,445	Gravel
- Sources: OurAirports Bing Maps

Coiba Airport is an airport serving Isla Coiba, a Pacific island in the Veraguas Province of Panama. The island and the surrounding waters are part of the Coiba National Park, a World Heritage Site.

The airport is on the eastern shore of the island. South approach and departure are over the water.

== See also ==
- Transport in Panama
- List of airports in Panama
