= Punta Patiño =

Nature reserve in Panama

Coordinates: 8°16′59″N 78°13′59″W

Designations

Ramsar Wetland
- Official name: Punta Patiño
- Designated: 13 October 1993
- Reference no.: 630

Punta Patiño is a nature reserve area in Panama. The 65,025 acre preserve is owned by conservation group ANCON. The area is on the List of Ramsar wetlands of international importance.

== Wildlife ==
Fauna in the reserve include harpy eagles, three-toed sloths, capybaras, bottlenose dolphins, crocodiles, jaguar, and humpback whales. Bird species include black oropendola, brown pelicans, frigate birds, terns, oystercatchers, willet, whimbrel, and spotted sandpiper, kingfishers, white ibis, heron, and laughing gulls. The reserve has been designated an Important Bird Area (IBA) by BirdLife International because it supports significant populations of many bird species.

== See also ==
- Protected areas of Panama
