= List of hospitals in Panama =

This is a list of hospitals for human medical treatment in Panama, in alphabetical order and categorized by province.

== Colón ==
- Hospital Manuel Amador Guerrero, social security hospital.

== Chiriquí ==
- Hospital Centro Médico Mae Lewis — David.
- Hospital Chiriquí — David.
- Hospital Materno Infantil Jose Domingo de Obaldía — David, a public pediatric hospital .
- Hospital Régional de Chiriqui

== Herrera ==
- Hospital Cecilio A. Castillero — Chitre, major public hospital.
- Hospital El Vigia — Chitre, a social security hospital.

== Los Santos ==
- Hospital Dr. Joaquin Franco — Las Tablas.

== Panamá ==
Hospital Nacional.

- Centro Médico Paitilla — Panama City.
- Clínica Hospital San Fernando — Panama City, a full-service private hospital.
- Complejo Hospitalario Metropolitano Arnulfo Arias Madrid — Panama City, main social security hospital.
- Hospital de Especialidades Pediátricas — Panama City, a social security pediatric hospital.
- Hospital del Niño (English: Children's Hospital) — Panama City, the largest pediatric hospital in the country.
- Hospital Integrado San Miguel Arcángel — San Miguelito, a mixed public and social security hospital.
- Hospital Nacional — Panama City, a full-service private hospital.
- Hospital Nicolás A. Solano — La Chorrera.
- Hospital Psiquiátrico Nacional — Panama City, the major psychiatric institution.
- Hospital Punta Pacifica, a full-service private hospital.
- Hospital Santa Fe — Panama City.
- Hospital Santo Tomas — Panama City, the largest public hospital in the country.
- Hospital Susana Jones — Panama City.
- Instituto Oncológico Nacional — Panama City, a specialized hospital for cancer treatment.

== Veraguas ==
- Hospital Regional de Veraguas Dr. Luis Fábrega — Santiago de Veraguas.
