= ANCON =

Panamanian conservation group

The Asociación Nacional para la Conservación de la Naturaleza (ANCON) is a conservation group in Panama. They own and manage Punta Patiño. The acronym is an ode to Ancón Hill, the highest point in Panama City and reserve of urban jungle.

Punta Patiño is on the List of Ramsar wetlands of international importance. The 65,025 acre preserve is owned by conservation group.

== See also ==
- Protected areas of Panama
