= Amelia Denis de Icaza =

Panamanian romantic poet

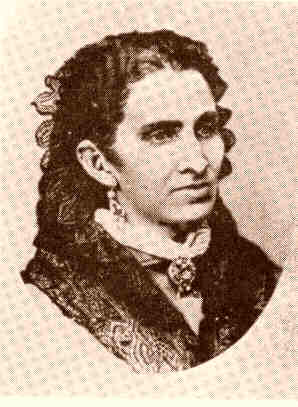
- Born: November 28, 1836; Panama City, Province of Panama, Republic of New Granada
- Died: July 16, 1911 (aged 74); Managua, Nicaragua
- Writing career
- Genre: Poetry

Amelia Denis de Icaza (November 28, 1836 – July 16, 1911) was a Colombian and later a Panamanian romantic poet. She was the first Panamanian woman to publish her poetry.

== Biography ==
Born in Panama City in 1836, her father was of French origin and her mother Panamanian. As a child, she was very interested in literature and wrote poems in a completely natural style without any trimmings. Her father Saturnino Denis was an editor at the time. She went to the local school in the Santa Ana district but received most of her cultural education at home, meeting poets whose works were published in La Floresta Istmeña. She married while still young and spent a lengthy period in Nicaragua. By some accounts, she also spent quite some time in Guatemala.

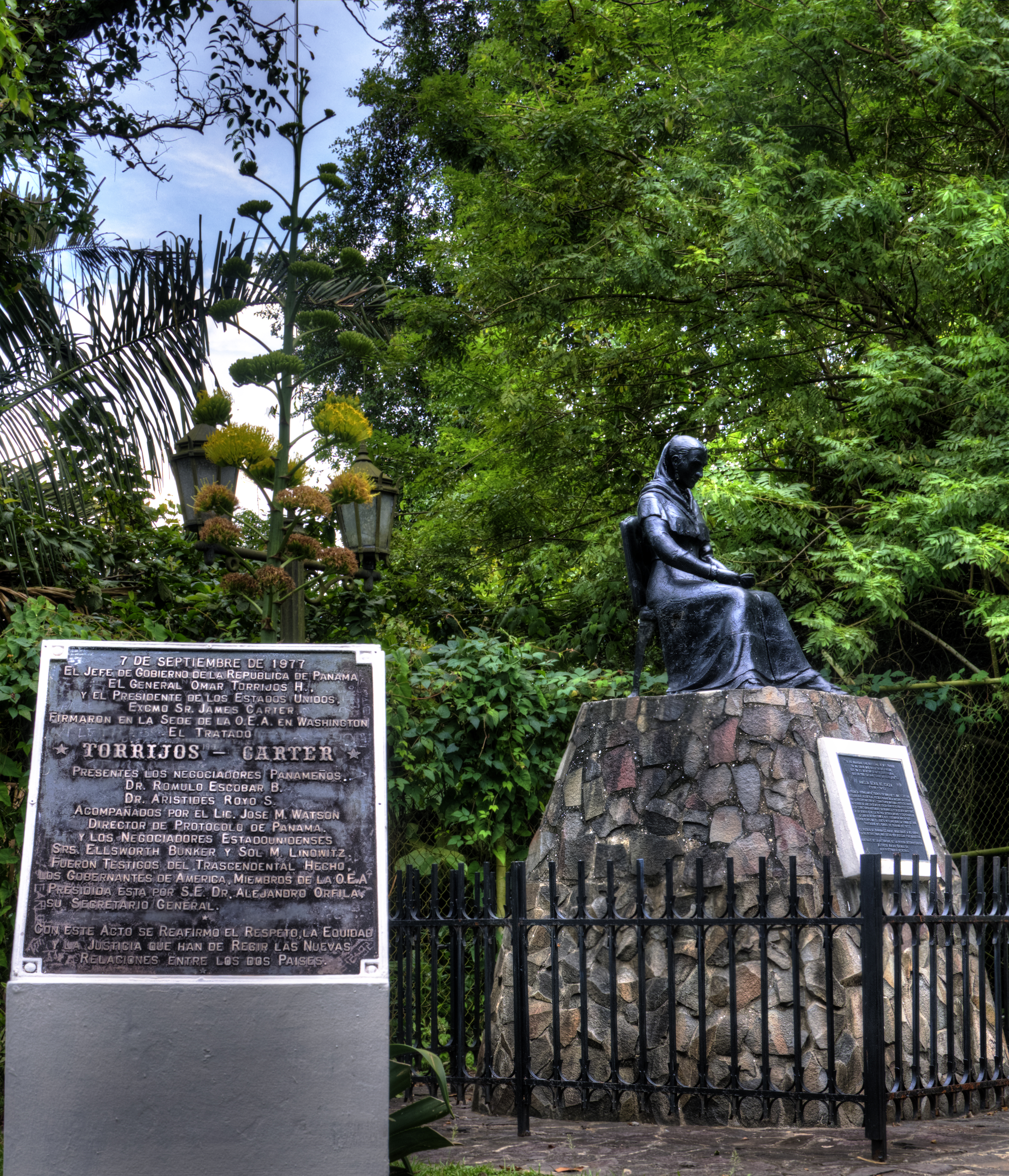
The monument to her on Ancon Hill

When she returned home, the Panama Canal Zone was in the hands of the Americans. This caused her considerable sadness which is reflected in one of her most beautiful poems, Al Cerro Ancón (1906). Ancon Hill became part of the land taken to build the Panama Canal and the hill became a national symbol after she wrote her poem about the American annexation. Today this hill still boasts a large national flag at its summit. Like her other works, Al Cerro Ancón has a strong patriotic flavour which is also reflected in Zona del Canal (the Canal Zone) which was closed to Panamanians. Other works include Patria, Hojas Secas, Amor de madre (1879) and A la Muerte de Victoriano Lorenzo.

Amelia Denis de Icaza died in Managua on 16 July 1911.

== Legacy ==
There is a large bronze statue to her on Ancon Hill in Panama which appropriately sits at the bottom of the flagpole from which is flown an extremely large Panamanian flag.

== See also ==
- List of Panamanian women writers
