= SS Dakota =

1904 US steamship

Coordinates: 34°54′N 139°50′E

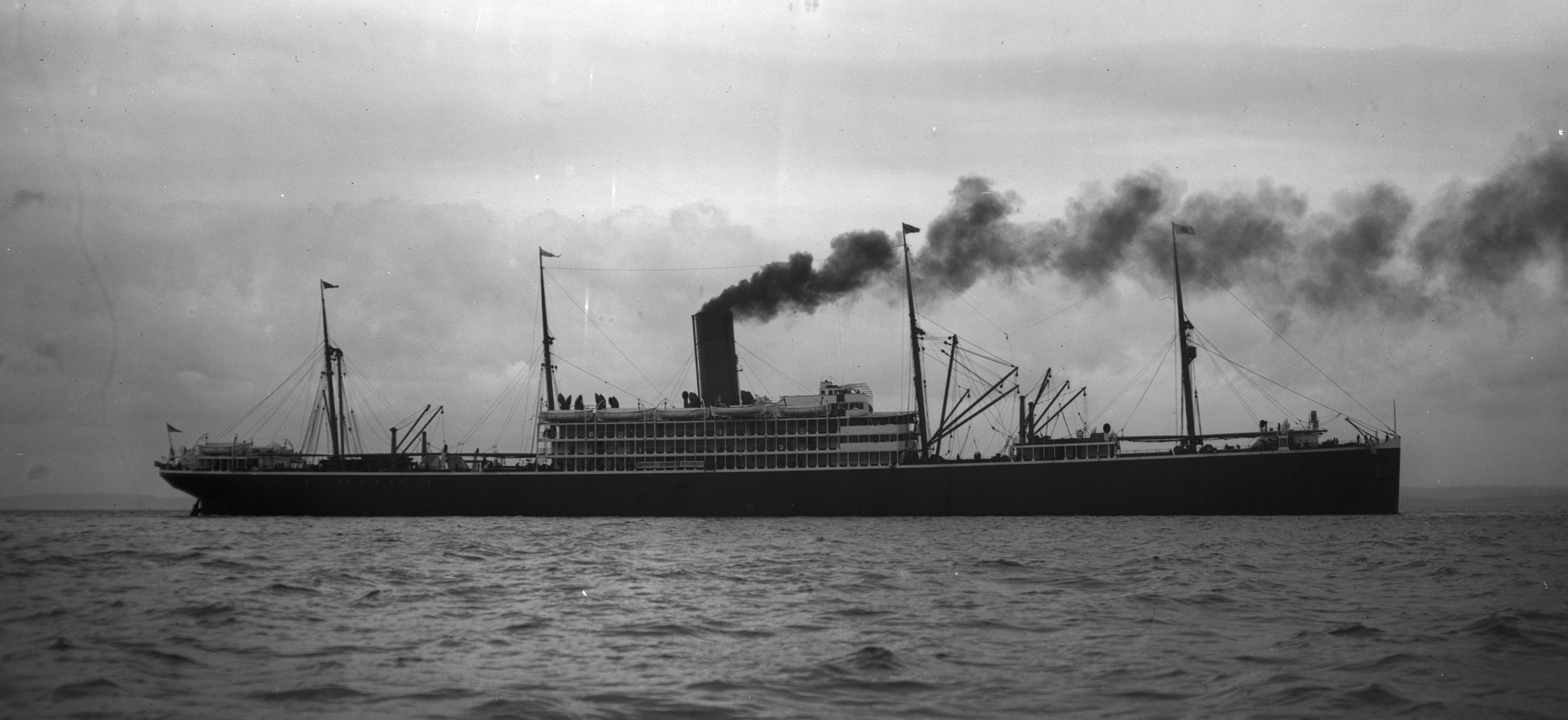
- A broadside image of the SS Dakota

History

United States
- Name: Dakota
- Namesake: North Dakota
- Owner: Great Northern Steamship Company
- Route: United States-Japan
- Builder: Eastern Shipbuilding Company, Groton
- Cost: $7,803,404.00 (along with Minnesota)
- Yard number: 2
- Launched: 6 February 1904
- Sponsored by: Miss Mary B. Flemington
- Completed: 22 March 1905
- Maiden voyage: 28 April 1905
- Home port: New York
- Identification: US Official Number: 201709; Call sign KTQM
- Fate: Wrecked, 3 March 1907
- Notes: Sister ship of SS Minnesota

General characteristics
- Type: Passenger Cargo Ship
- Tonnage: 20,714 GRT; 13,306 NRT
- Length: 622 ft 0 in (189.59 m)
- Beam: 73 ft 5 in (22.38 m)
- Depth: 41 ft 5 in (12.62 m)
- Installed power: 2,565 Nhp
- Propulsion: 2 × Midvale Steel Co. 3-cylinder triple expansion; Twin propellers
- Speed: 14.6 knots (27.0 km/h)
- Capacity: 218 first-class passengers; 68 second-class passengers; 2,300 steerage passengers

Dakota was a steamship built by the Eastern Shipbuilding Company of Groton, Connecticut for the Great Northern Steamship Company owned by railroad magnate James J. Hill to enhance and promote trade between the United States and Japan.

== Design and construction ==
In 1904 the Great Northern Railway made an effort to facilitate trade with Asia, particularly with Japan and China, by entering into the shipping business, and as a part of this endeavor two great steamers of approximately 20,000 GRT were ordered. Dakota was the second of these vessels, and was laid down at the Eastern Shipbuilding Company's yard at Groton, and launched on February 6, 1904 (yard number 2), with Miss Mary Bell Flemington of Ellendale being the sponsor. The ceremony was attended by nearly 5,000 people, including the governor of Connecticut Abiram Chamberlain, ex-governor Thomas Waller, James J. Hill, president of the Great Northern Steamship Company, many members of the board of trade from Minnesota and North and South Dakota, senators Hansborough and McCumber of North Dakota among others. At the time, she and her sister-ship Minnesota were described as the largest ships ever built in America. The ship was of an awning-deck type, and was constructed using the most modern shipbuilding safety and protection ideas. She had a double-bottom through her entire length, and had her hull subdivided into numerous watertight bulkheads. The vessel was built with the view of North Pacific trade and had her hull strengthened, with some of her double plates being 2 1/2 inches (6.4 cm) thick. Additionally, the vessel had a newly patented gaseous fire extinguishing system installed throughout her holds. Each of her two engines had their own watertight compartments built around them, theoretically allowing the ship to continue sailing using only one of the engines, if the other one got flooded. She was also equipped with all the modern machinery for quick cargo loading and unloading and had 32 electric winches and a large number of derricks installed. The steamer also had an experimental mechanical stoker system installed for testing purposes, and if it had proven to be successful, her sister-ship Minnesota would have been equipped with a similar system.

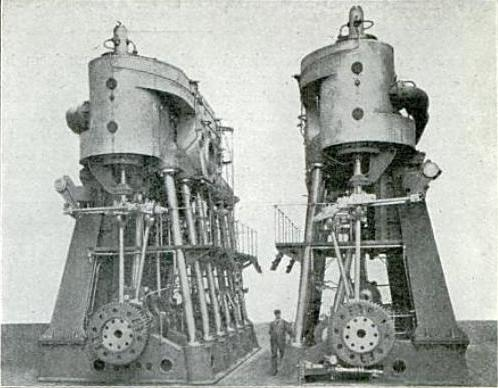
Main engines of the SS Dakota

In addition to the vast amount of cargo the ship could carry, Dakota had also accommodations constructed for 218 first-class, 68 second-class and approximately 2,300 steerage passengers. The first class cabins were located in the large deck-house amidships which also featured a dining salon, being able to sit approximately 200 people, a library and a ladies boudoir. The bridge deck housed a smoking room and a cafe which was open 24 hours a day. To provide for such a large number of passengers, the vessel had a refrigerating plant installed, operating on the American-Linde system, capable of cooling 300 tons of provisions, and refrigerating 1,700 tons of produce. The vessel was also equipped with four large evaporators in her engine room, capable of producing 30,000 gallons of fresh water per day to be used both by her boilers and passengers and crew.

Dakota could have been easily converted to a troopship in case of need, and she would be able to transport approximately 1,300 troops in addition to all their equipment.

After successful completion of 24-hour-long sea trials held on March 23–24, 1905, during which the ship was able to maintain an average speed of 17.7 knots (20.4 mph; 32.8 km/h) over a continuous run of 59 miles, which she was able to complete in 3 hours and 20 minutes. Following the sea trials the ship proceeded to Newport News and entered the drydock where some minor adjustments and painting were done.

As built, the ship was 622 feet 0 inches (189.59 m) long (between perpendiculars) and 73 feet 5 inches (22.38 m) abeam, a depth of 41 feet 5 inches (12.62 m). Dakota was originally assessed at 20,714 GRT and 13,306 NRT and had deadweight of approximately 19,000. The vessel had a steel hull, and two triple-expansion steam engines of combined power of 2,565 nhp, with cylinders of 29-inch (74 cm), 51-inch (130 cm) and 89-inch (230 cm) diameter with a 57-inch (140 cm) stroke, that drove two screw propellers, and moved the ship at up to 15.0 knots (17.3 mph; 27.8 km/h).

== Operational history ==
After finalizing her painting job, Dakota proceeded from Norfolk to New York for loading. She left the port for her maiden voyage on April 28, 1905, laden with general cargo and approximately 6,000 tons of steel rails destined for Alaska Railroad being constructed at the time. The journey to South America was largely uneventful, with the exception of severe gales encountered around Cape Horn, and the ship safely reached the Chilean port of Coronel on May 28 to replenish her bunkers. She departed from Chile on June 3 and arrived at San Francisco around noon on June 20 to partially discharge her cargo. The vessel sailed from California in the afternoon of June 24 and reached Seattle around noon on June 27, thus finishing her maiden voyage. Overall, all ship systems functioned as intended with the exception of the mechanical stokers which started having problems after coaling in Chile, and completely failed by the time the ship arrived in Seattle.

Originally, Dakota was scheduled to leave for the Far East on July 20, but the departure was postponed due to inability of her owners to completely fill the enormous vessel with cargo. Finally, she sailed out from Seattle in the early morning of July 24, only being slightly more than half-laden, but was only able to continue as far as Cape Flattery before developing a serious problem in her starboard engine and was forced to turn back. Upon return, all her cargo and passengers were transferred to Minnesota while she proceeded to Puget Sound Navy Yard for repairs. After wrapping up her repairs on August 9, the vessel returned to port and this time embarked over 20,000 tons of cargo, the bulk consisting of 19 locomotives, 100 railroad cars, and 20,000 bales of cotton. Dakota sailed for her first Trans-Pacific trip on September 20, carrying, besides cargo, a large number of passengers among them Yamaza Enjirō, H.W. Dennison and five other members of Japanese delegation which just finished successfully negotiating the Treaty of Portsmouth. She arrived at Yokohama on October 5, discharging the majority of her cargo, and disembarking many of her passengers including the Japanese delegation, and sailed for Shanghai reaching it on October 28. On her return trip, she caught fire on November 12 while anchored at Kobe which delayed her departure. The damage from fire was apparently minimal and Dakota was able to sail from Yokohama on November 16 with approximately 7,000 tons of freight and 62 passengers, arriving at Seattle on November 29 finalizing her first Trans-Pacific voyage. Starting with her second Trans-Pacific trip, which she left for on December 16, 1905, Dakota was visiting Manila in addition to the ports in Japan and Shanghai and Hong Kong in China. She returned to Seattle on February 28, 1906, carrying, among other passengers, members of the Chinese Imperial High Commission headed by Prince Tsai Tseh sent to study the political and trade conditions of United States and European countries. On the return journey during her third trip, Dakota beat the previous speed record held by the Empress of India being able to cover the distance from Yokohama to Cape Flattery in 9 1/2 days with 2,000 tons of cargo and 199 passengers on board.

=== Sinking ===
Dakota departed for her seventh trans-Pacific voyage from Seattle on February 17, 1907. The ship was under the command of captain Emil Francke, a former German navy officer and a former captain of the American Line steamer St. Louis and had a crew consisting of 59 whites and 220 Chinese. The ship was carrying 94 passengers and 6,720 tons of general cargo consisting largely of cotton, wheat and flour and valued at $445,984.00. The steamer passed Inuboye around noon on March 3, and arrived in view of Nojimazaki Lighthouse in the afternoon, with weather being clear and the seas calm. As the ship got delayed somewhat on her departure, captain Francke wanted to make up time and arrive at Yokohama before the darkness would set in and avoid all the fishing boats that would flood the Tokyo Bay and would force the ship to slow down considerably. At approximately 16:00 captain Francke relieved the first officer and assumed control of the bridge. The ship was travelling at about 16 1/2 knots (19.0 mph; 30.6 km/h) at the time and was sailing very close to the coastline contrary to an accepted practice as the area is known to be full of underwater rocks and reefs.

At 17:04, as the passengers on board were enjoying their tea on deck, the steamer ran aground at full speed over a reef about a mile off Shirahama. Due to speed of the vessel, she went about 3/4 of her length over the reef before coming to a stop, damaging her bottom in the process. The ship quickly filled with water, sinking her bow up to the second mast, and extinguishing the engines, with only her stern part being above the water. Panic spread among the passengers, but the order was quickly restored by the crew, and the lifeboats were lowered. Being only about a mile away from the shore, a large number of sampans sprang to her aid, as well as the boats from a nearby steamer Tokai Maru which witnessed the whole incident. All passengers and crew safely reached the land, and were housed in the lighthouse and nearby hamlets as the area was very sparsely populated. Steamer Omi Maru was dispatched from Yokohama to collect the passengers, but she had to return empty-handed as it was impossible to get close to the wreck. During the night of March 3 the wreck of Dakota was looted by the locals and in response the Japanese government dispatched cruiser Yaeyama and a torpedo boat to stand by to prevent any further incidents but only stayed for a short while due to inability to close in to the wreck.

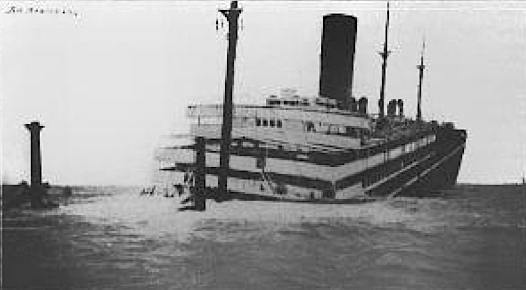
Dakota one hour after going on the reef.

At about 08:40 on March 5, steamer Hakuai Maru arrived at the scene to embark the survivors, but again found it impossible to complete the task due strong wind and rough seas. Instead, the passengers and the crew, with the exception of captain Francke and some officers who stayed behind, travelled overland to the nearby town of Tateyama where Hakuai Maru embarked them all and ten bags of mail and departed at 16:30 for Yokohama and reached the port at about 21:00. The majority of crew left Yokohama on March 11 for Tacoma on board the steamer Tremont, while the majority of white passengers returned to United States via Siberia.

On March 11 the vessel was abandoned by her owners to the underwriters, with James Hill collecting $2,500,000.00 in insurance money. The wreck was subsequently examined by divers who claimed the bottom had only four holes on the starboard side and the prospects of refloating the vessel were not as bad as they originally thought. Salvage operations commenced on March 19 but only lasted four days as Dakota broke amidships during a gale on March 22–23. Only about 5% of her cargo was saved. By May 1907 the wreck completely broke up and disappeared under water.

An inquiry into the loss was held in Seattle in April 1907. Captain Francke claimed that the ship was carried onto the rocks by strong current and all his attempts to change the course were unsuccessful as steering gear was unresponsive. His chief engineer claimed there were no issues with the steering gear whatsoever. The commission found Emil Francke guilty in careless and irresponsible navigation, as he travelled too fast and too close to the coast known for its dangers, never attempted to establish the ship position as no soundings were performed, and abandoning the ship too quickly and leaving her open to looters even though the vessel remained afloat for many days after the accident. He had his license suspended for 2 1/2 years, but since his license expired on May 2 and the decision was rendered after that date it was legally unenforceable. Nevertheless, captain Francke appealed the decision and had the punishment was first shortened to 18 months but later he was further censured.

After the ship was lost, Hill vowed not to make any more ships under the American flag, noting the high cost of maintaining a ship in America compared to Japan due to restrictions he regarded as "onerous." Hill did eventually build more ships such as the Great Northern and the Northern Pacific.
