= Sambú =

- Corregimiento
- Location within Panama
- Coordinates: 8°01′30″N 78°12′30″W
- Country: Panama
- Province: Darién
- District: Chepigana

Area
  - Land: 38.8 km^{2} (15.0 sq mi)

Population (2010)
  - Total: 931
  - Density: 24/km^{2} (62/sq mi)
- Population density calculated based on land area.
- Time zone: EST
- Climate: Aw

Sambú is a corregimiento in Chepigana District, Darién Province, Panama with a population of 931 as of 2010. Its population as of 1990 was 762; its population as of 2000 was 747. It is located at the confluence of the Sambú and Sabalo rivers. The town has an airstrip with a paved runway.
