= Ancón, Panama =

Ancón
- Corregimiento
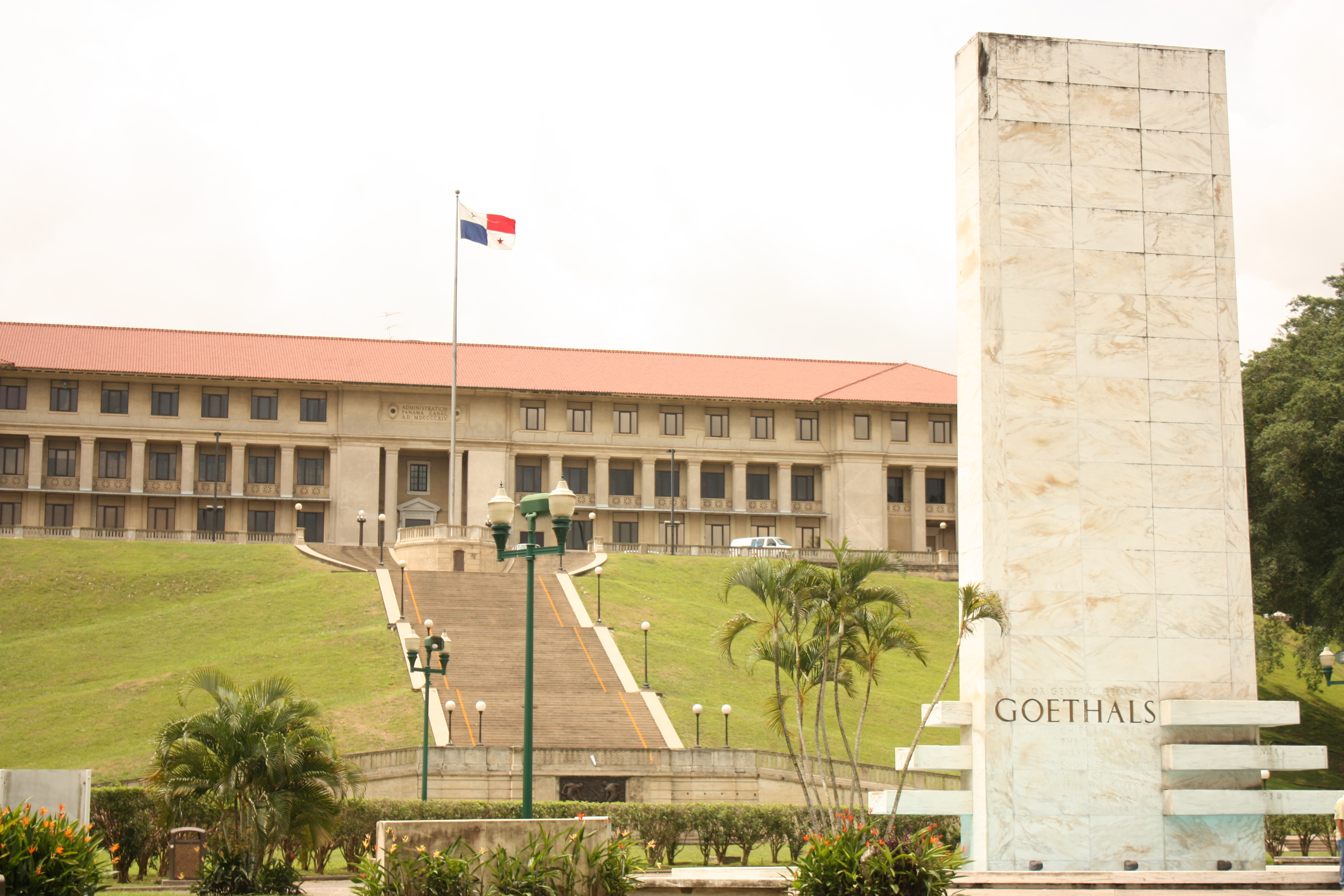
- Building that houses the headquarters of the Panama Canal Authority and the George W. Goethals Monument

- Location within Panama
- Coordinates: 8°58′12″N 79°33′0″W
- Country: Panama
- Province: Panamá
- District: Panamá

Area
  - Land: 204.6 km^{2} (79.0 sq mi)

Population (2010)
  - Total: 29,761
  - Density: 145.5/km^{2} (377/sq mi)
- Population density calculated based on land area.
- Time zone: UTC−5 (EST)

Ancón is a corregimiento in Panamá District, Panamá Province, Panama with a population of 29,761 as of 2010. Its population as of 1990 was 11,518; its population as of 2000 was 11,169. It is sometimes considered a suburb or small town within Panama City, northeast of the limits of the town of Balboa. Ancon Hill is also the name of a large hill that overlooks Panama City and once served as a form of protection from pirates and sea invasion. The township was originally located around this hill, and was created to house employees of the Panama Canal during its construction. As part of the construction effort, the historic Gorgas Army Hospital was founded and built on the hillside. The first ship to officially transit the canal, SS Ancon, was named after the district. The community continued to serve as housing for employees of the Panama Canal Company until 1980, when parts of it began to be turned over to the Panamanian government under the 1977 Torrijos-Carter Treaties. Modern-day Ancón is a corregimiento (the Panamanian equivalent of a suburb in the United States) of Panama City, serving mainly as a residential area. The Gorgas Army Hospital building is now the Panamanian Oncology Hospital, primarily used for cancer research. The area also houses Panama's Supreme Court, just a few feet away from the Gorgas Army Hospital building, and several Smithsonian Tropical Research Institute buildings for research into tropical biology. Ancón is also a parish (parroquia) of the District of Panama, located in the Panama Canal adjacent area.

== History ==
The area where the district of Ancón is located was always conceived as a place of transit. From the Spanish arrival on the Isthmus of Panama in 1501, it was thought to build there a road between the Atlantic and Pacific oceans, an idea that was materialized with the construction of the Panama Canal.

During the years when the Panama Canal was under the control of the United States, many administrative facilities, military bases, and communities were built in the adjacent areas, forming part of the former Panama Canal Zone. When these areas were reverted to Panama under the Torrijos-Carter Treaties, several alternatives were proposed to integrate the district to the city of Panama. The current district of Ancón was created when a new political-administrative division for the reverted areas was adopted, by Act No. 18 of August 29, 1979, and later amended by Law No. 1 of October 27, 1982. The areas located in the Pacific sector became part of this district, while those located on the Atlantic side were incorporated into the district of Cristobal, in the province of Colon. They remain characterized by a strong US urban architectural style.

== Economy ==
Due to its geographical location, the district of Ancón is of great importance for the economy of Panama. In it are located most of the administrative facilities and services related to the Panama Canal. Balboa is home to the port of Panama City. The district also home to the Administrative Unit of Reverted properties of the Ministry of Economy and Finance, established in 2007 as a replacement for the former Inter-Oceanic Region Authority. Many of the buildings belonging to former US military bases are today sites of Panamanian governmental and nongovernmental institutions, such as the City of Knowledge, the main science and technology park in the country, in the area of the former Fort Clayton.

Besides its importance in the fields of trade and intermodal transportation, the district is becoming increasingly relevant in terms of services and tourism. Ancón is home to the Marcos A. Gelabert International Airport, the Grand National Transportation Terminal, and Albrook Mall, the largest mall in the country.

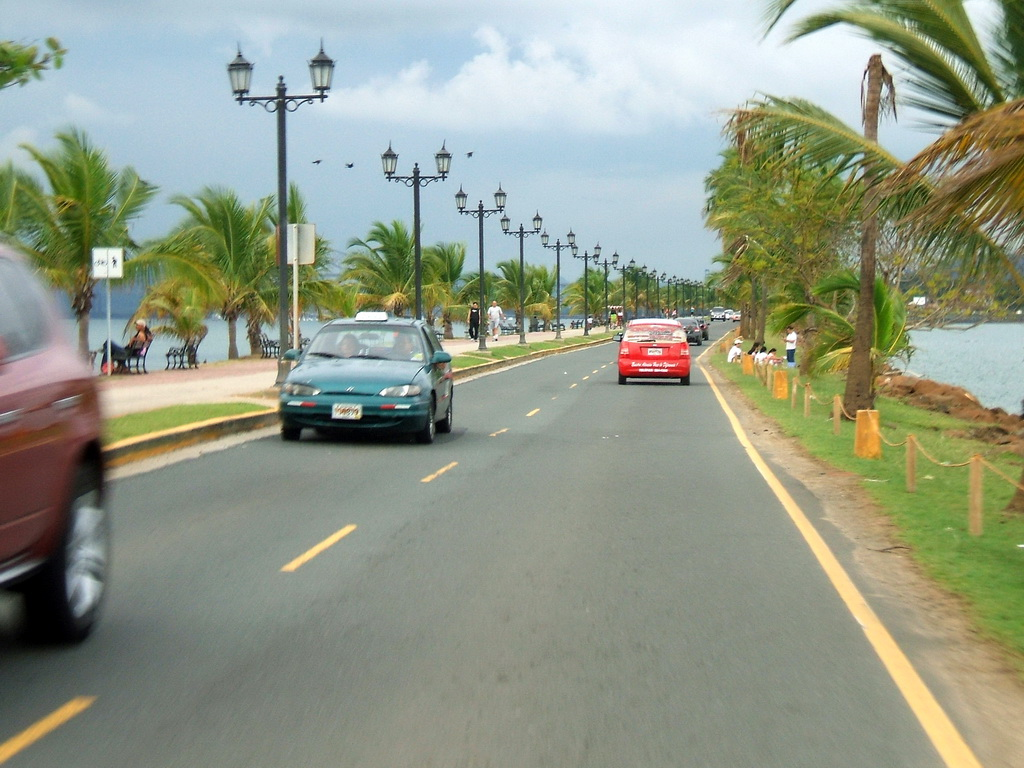
Amador Causeway

== Sites of interest ==
The district of Ancón includes the Parque Natural Metropolitano, a vast jungle located a few minutes from the city, and its highest elevation, Ancon Hill. In its urban areas, you can visit several historical sites of the Panamanian capital, the building that houses the headquarters of the Panama Canal Authority, popularly known as the Administration Building. The Amador Causeway, a section of which runs over the sea, joining three small Pacific islands, is one of the city's most popular tourist attractions, with marinas, restaurants, bars, and discothèques. There is also the Figali Convention Center, while the Museum of Biodiversity, designed by renowned architect Frank Gehry, is currently in construction.

== See also ==
- Postage stamps and postal history of the Canal Zone
