= SS Minnesota (1903) =

American built ocean-liner

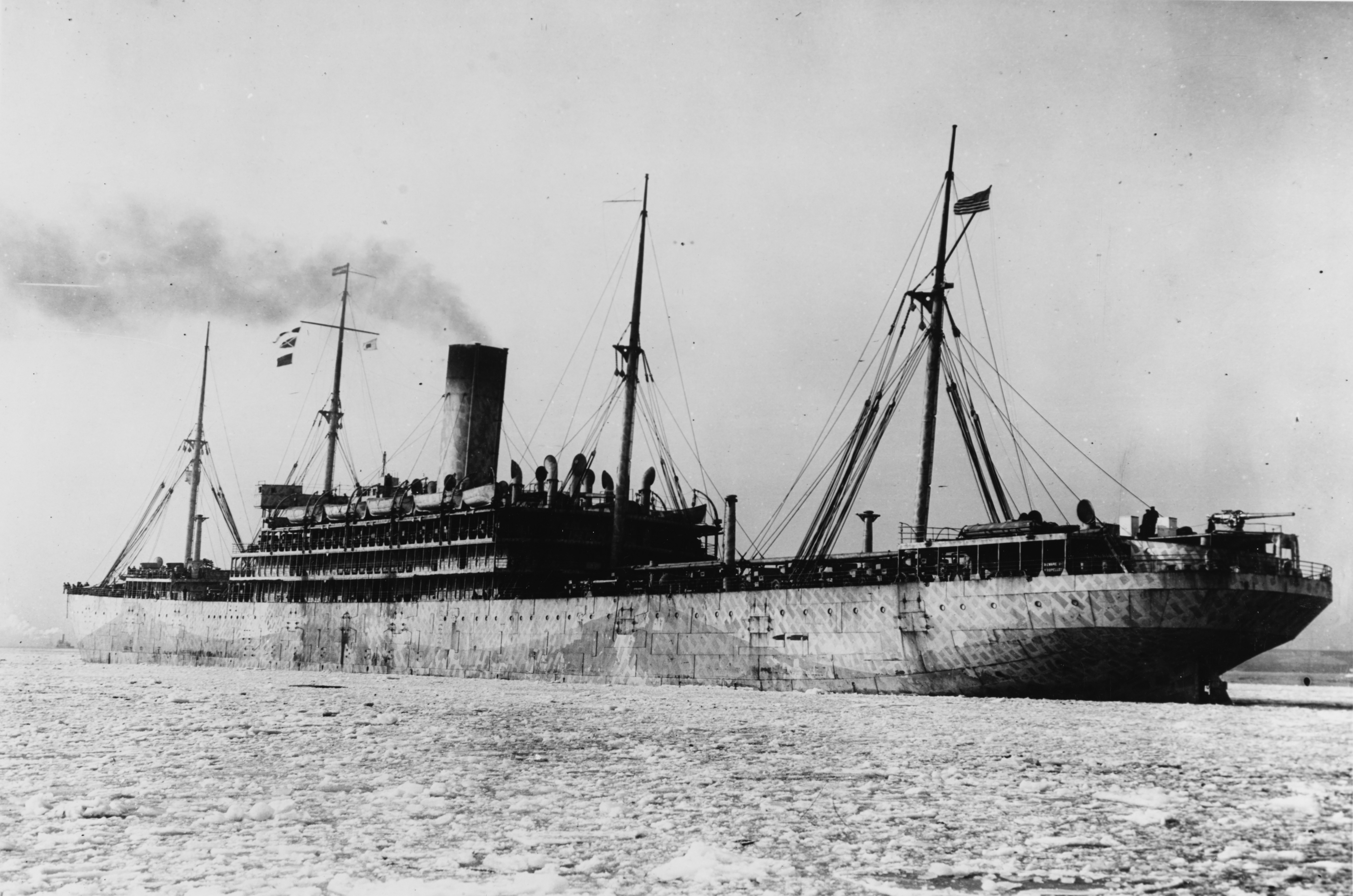
- Minnesota during WW1 in icy harbor winter of 1917-18

History

United States
- Name: Minnesota (1903–1919); USS Troy (1919)
- Owner: James J. Hill
- Operator: Great Northern Steamship Company; Atlantic Transport Line, 1917 under her original name
- Route: Pacific; America-to-Japan
- Builder: Eastern Shipbuilding Company, New London Connecticut
- Cost: $7,803,404.00 (along with Dakota)
- Laid down: January 15, 1901
- Launched: April 16, 1903
- Acquired: 1904
- Maiden voyage: January 23, 1905, from Smith Cove, Elliott Bay Seattle
- In service: January 23, 1905
- Fate: Scrapped 1923 in Germany
- Notes: November 1915 the ship was possibly a victim of German sabotage to her boilers

General characteristics
- Tonnage: 20,718 GRT; 13,324 NRT
- Length: 622 feet
- Decks: 9 decks
- Installed power: two engines of triple-expansion type
- Propulsion: Twin screws, 3 bladed

SS Minnesota was an American built ocean-liner operated by the Great Northern Steamship Company which was owned by James J. Hill. From 27 February 1919 until 15 September 1919 the ship was recommissioned as the USS Troy for the U.S. naval service. She was an identical sister ship to the SS Dakota which sank in Japan in 1907. Both ships built in 1903 were the largest and most luxurious liners built in the United States at the opening of the 20th century. The passenger telephone system, and another installed for the ship's use, was advertised by the manufacturer, Electric Gas Lighting Company of Boston, to be the largest shipboard installations.

Minnesota was sold in January 1917 to the Atlantic Transport Company of West Virginia, part of J. P. Morgan's International Mercantile Marine Company, reaching New York in March where she was armed in accordance with measures authorized for merchant ships and received a U.S. Navy armed guard gun crew. The ship was in English waters when the United States declared war and made seven wartime round trips. During one of the New York port calls the ship was inspected and accepted for U.S. Navy use assigned the identification number 1614 until the end of hostilities whereupon the armament and naval personnel were removed.

The Navy chartered Minnesota to bring troops home, renamed the ship Troy and placed her in commission at the Army's Bush Terminal in Brooklyn, N.Y., on 27 February 1919 under the command of Lt. Comdr. Thomas W. Garlick, USNRF. Troy departed 9 May 1919 in the first of a series of voyages until decommissioned on 15 September 1919, returned to her owners and regaining the name Minnesota. The ship was converted for oil use but never operated again at sea. During the flu pandemic the ship was operated as a floating isolation hospital in New York.

She was scrapped in 1923.
