= SMDP =

SMDP may refer to:

- Santa Monica Daily Press, newspaper in Santa Monica, California
- Single-member district plurality (also known as first-past-the-post voting), an electoral system used for national elections
- St Martin de Porres School (Ghana), school in Ghana
- St. Martin de Porres High School (SMdP), original name of Cristo Rey St. Martin College Prep, high school in Illinois, US
- Shahabad Mohammadpur railway station in Delhi, India
- multiple entries in St. Martin de Porres (disambiguation)

== See also ==
- SMPD (disambiguation)
- SNDP
