= San José, Veraguas =

San José, Veraguas may refer to:

Veraguas Province of Panama:

- San José, Calobre
- San José, Cañazas
- San José, San Francisco

== See also ==
- San José (disambiguation)
