= St. Martin de Porres (disambiguation) =

Martin de Porres (Juan Martin de Porres, 1579–1639) is a Peruvian Roman Catholic patron saint of mixed-race people and racial harmony, usually depicted holding a black scapular and capuce in iconography.

San, Saint or St. Martin de Porres may also refer to:

== Places ==
- San Martín de Porres District, a district in Lima, Peru, located in the area known as Cono Norte
- San Martín de Porres, Las Palmas, Panama
- San Martín de Porres, Santiago, Panama
- San Martin de Porres, Parañaque, the Philippines

== Schools ==
- St Martin de Porres, Adelaide, an elementary school in Sheidow Park, South Australia, Australia
- St Martin de Porres School (Ghana)
- University of San Martín de Porres, Lima, Peru
- Central Saint Martins, the College of Arts and Design of the University of the Arts London, United Kingdom
  - Saint Martin's School of Art, an art college that merged to form Central Saint Martins in 1989
- Cristo Rey St. Martin College Prep formerly St. Martin de Porres High School, a Catholic school in Waukegan, Lake County, Illinois, USA
- Saint Martin de Porres High School (Detroit), a defunct school in Wayne County, Michigan, USA
- St. Martin de Porres High School (Cleveland), a school in Cleveland, Cuyahoga County, Ohio, USA
- St. Martin de Porres School, in Philadelphia. See List of schools of the Roman Catholic Archdiocese of Philadelphia

== Other uses ==
- Church of St. Martin de Porres (Poughkeepsie, New York), a Roman Catholic parish church
- Club Deportivo Universidad de San Martín de Porres, a football club based in Lima, Peru
- Saint Martin de Porres (sculpture), a 1963 statue by Father Thomas McGlynn
- St. Martin de Porres Hospital, a Catholic hospital in Eikwe, Ghana
- San Martín de Porres (telenovela), a Mexican telenovela

== See also ==
- Saint Martin (disambiguation)
- St Martin's School (disambiguation), other schools named Saint Martin
