= Rubén Cantú Airport =

Ruben Cantu Airport
- IATA: SYP; ICAO: MPSA

Summary
- Airport type: Military/Public
- Operator: Military of Panama
- Location: San Antonio, Panama, Panama
- Elevation AMSL: 272 ft / 83 m
- Coordinates: 8°05′10″N 80°56′43″W

Map
- Location in Panama

Runways
Direction	Length		Surface
Direction	m	ft	Surface
17/35	1,200	3,937	Asphalt
- Source: WAD SkyVector GCM

Ruben Cantu Airport (IATA: SYP, ICAO: MPSA) is an airport serving Atalaya District, of the Veraguas Province of Panama. The airport is 2 kilometres (1 mi) southeast of the city.

== See also ==
- Transport in Panama
- List of airports in Panama
