= Montijo =

Montijo can refer to:

== Places ==
Panama

- Montijo, Panama populated place in Veraguas Province
- Montijo District, a district in Veraguas Province

Portugal

- Montijo, Portugal, a municipality in the district of Setúbal
- Montijo (parish), a civil parish in the municipality of Montijo

Spain

- Montijo, Spain
  - Battle of Montijo, 1644 battle between Spain and Portugal

== See also ==
- Eugénie de Montijo, wife of Napoleon III
