= La Raya =

La Raya may refer to:

- La Raya, Murcia, municipality in Spain
- La Raya de Santa María, municipality in Panama
- La Raya de Calobre, municipality in Panama
- La Raya mountain range, part of the Andes of Peru
- La Raya, informal name for the Portugal–Spain border

== See also ==
- Larraya, municipality in Spain
- Raya (disambiguation)
