= Calobre =

- Corregimiento
- Location within Panama
- Coordinates: 8°19′12″N 80°50′24″W
- Country: Panama
- Province: Veraguas
- District: Calobre

Area
  - Land: 84.8 km^{2} (32.7 sq mi)

Population (2010)
  - Total: 2,514
  - Density: 29.7/km^{2} (77/sq mi)
- Population density calculated based on land area.
- Time zone: UTC−5 (EST)

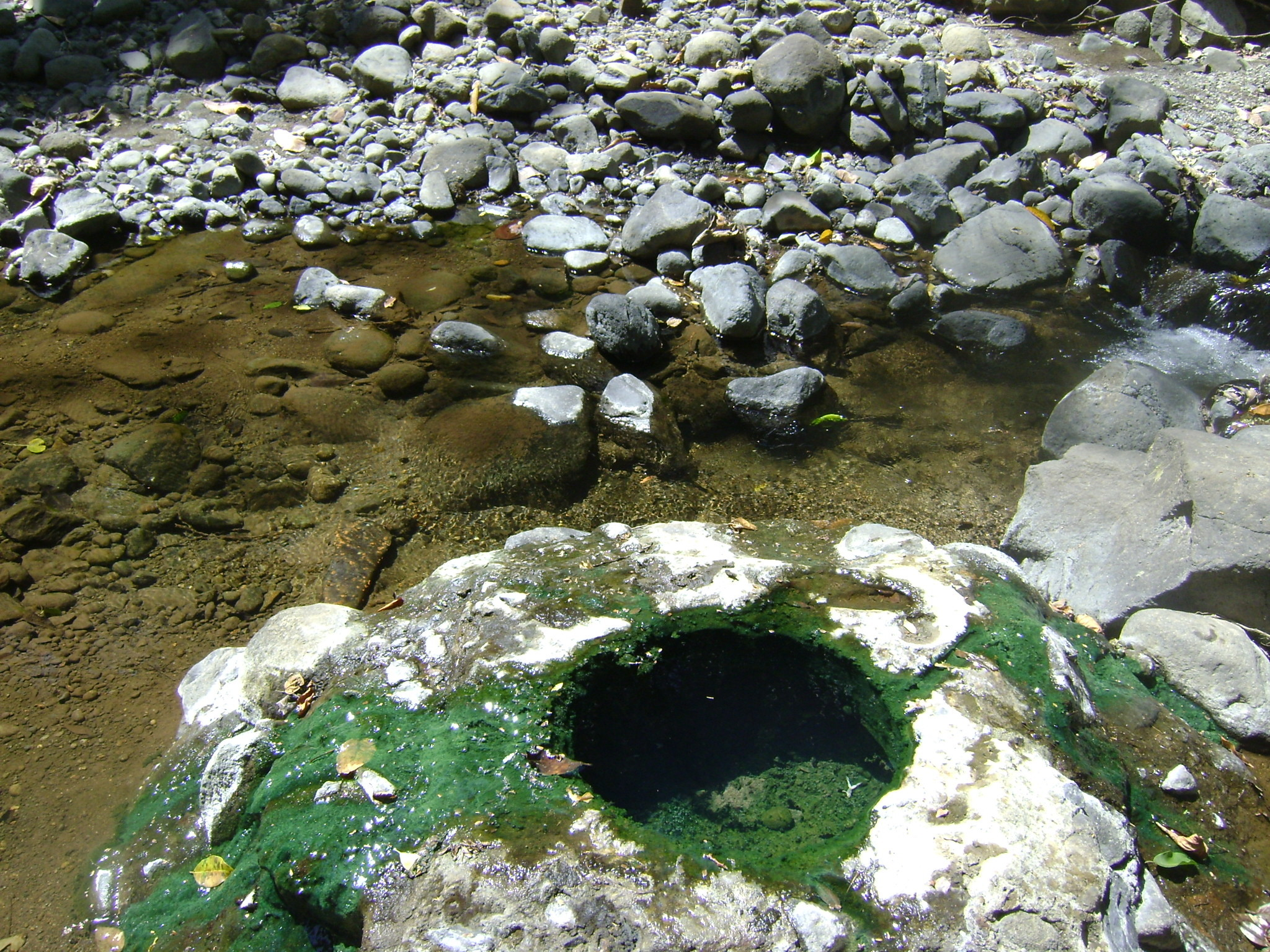
Thermal springs

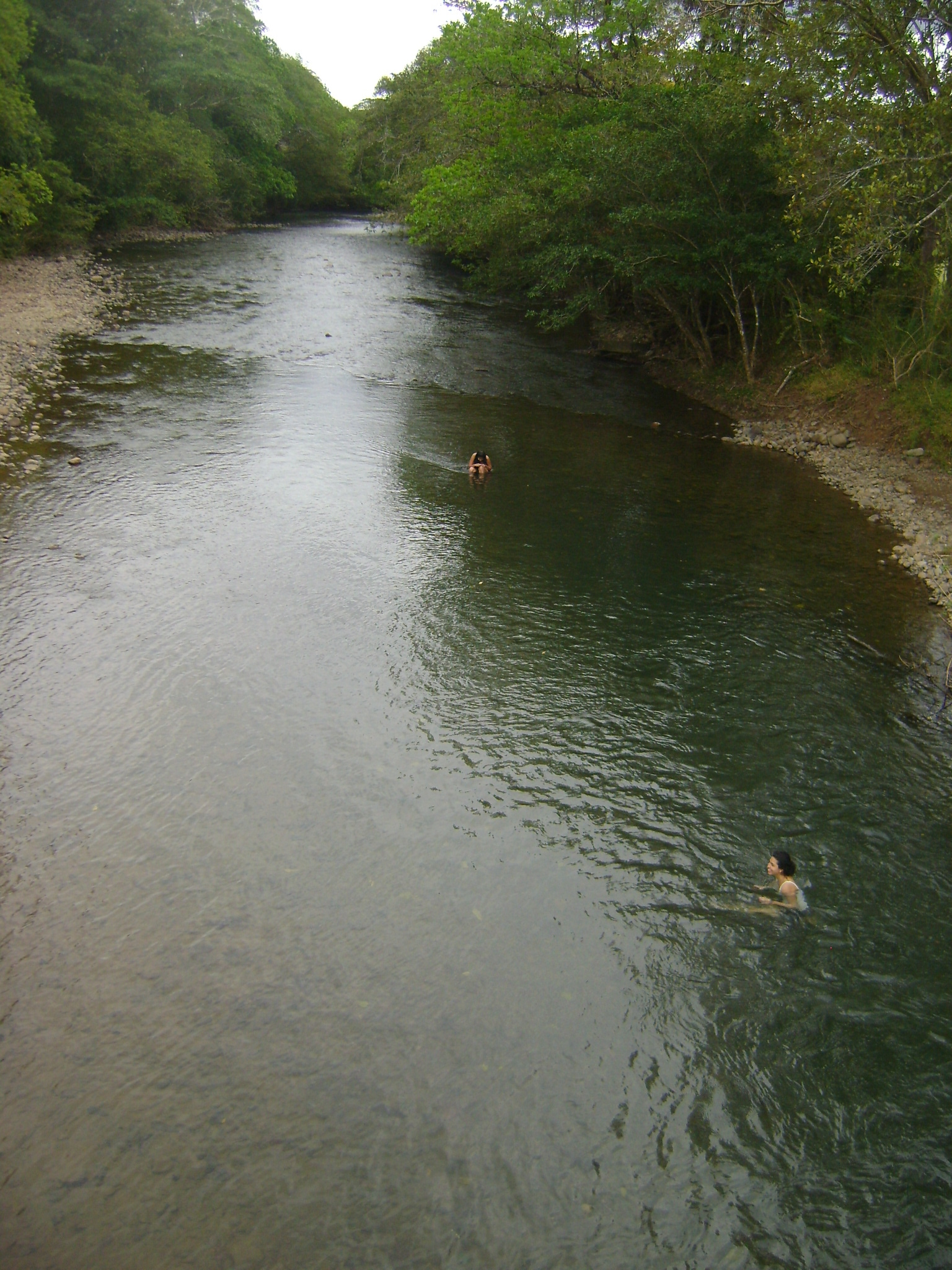
Río San Juan, Veraguas

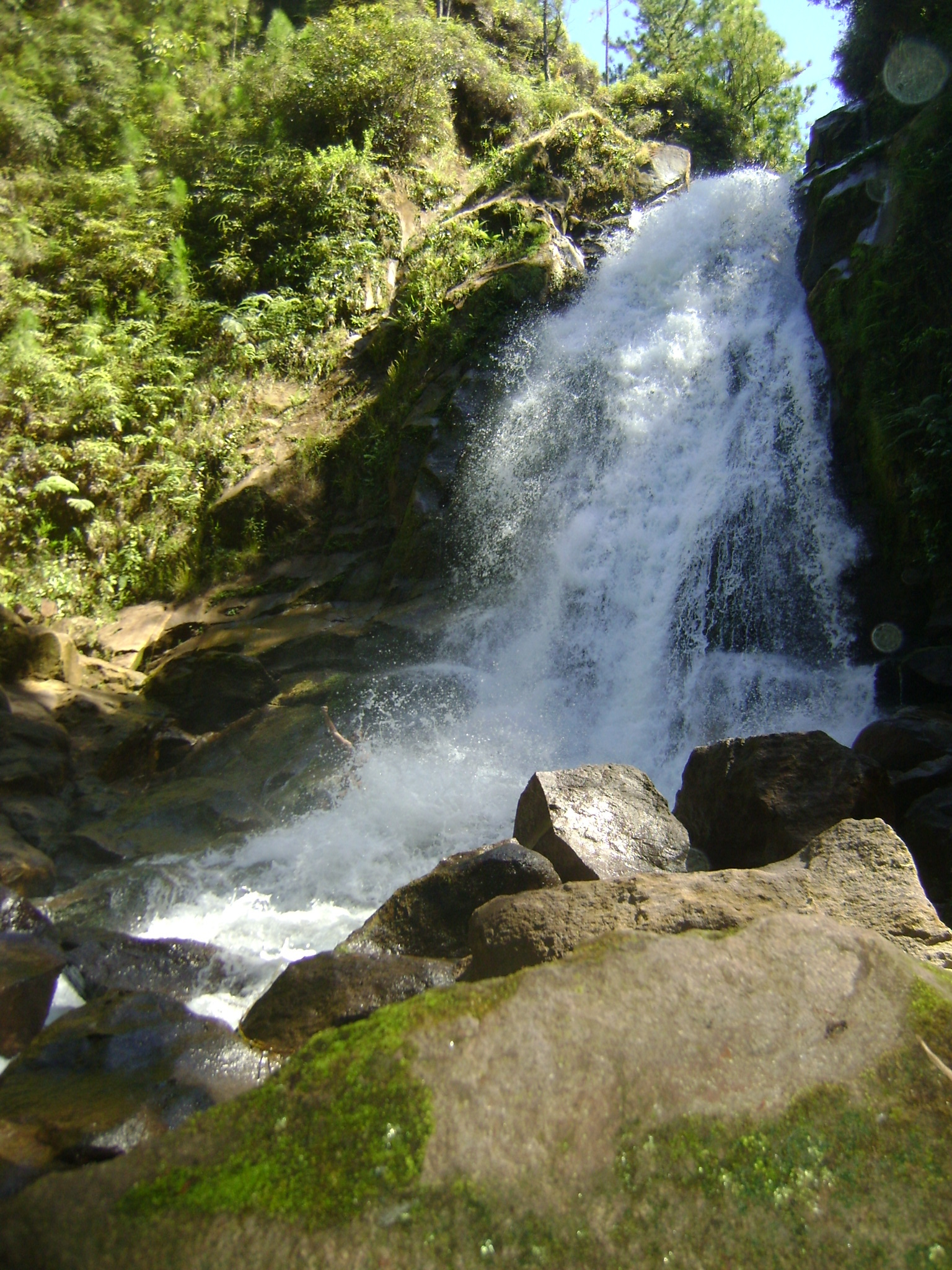
Waterfall in La Yeguada, Veraguas

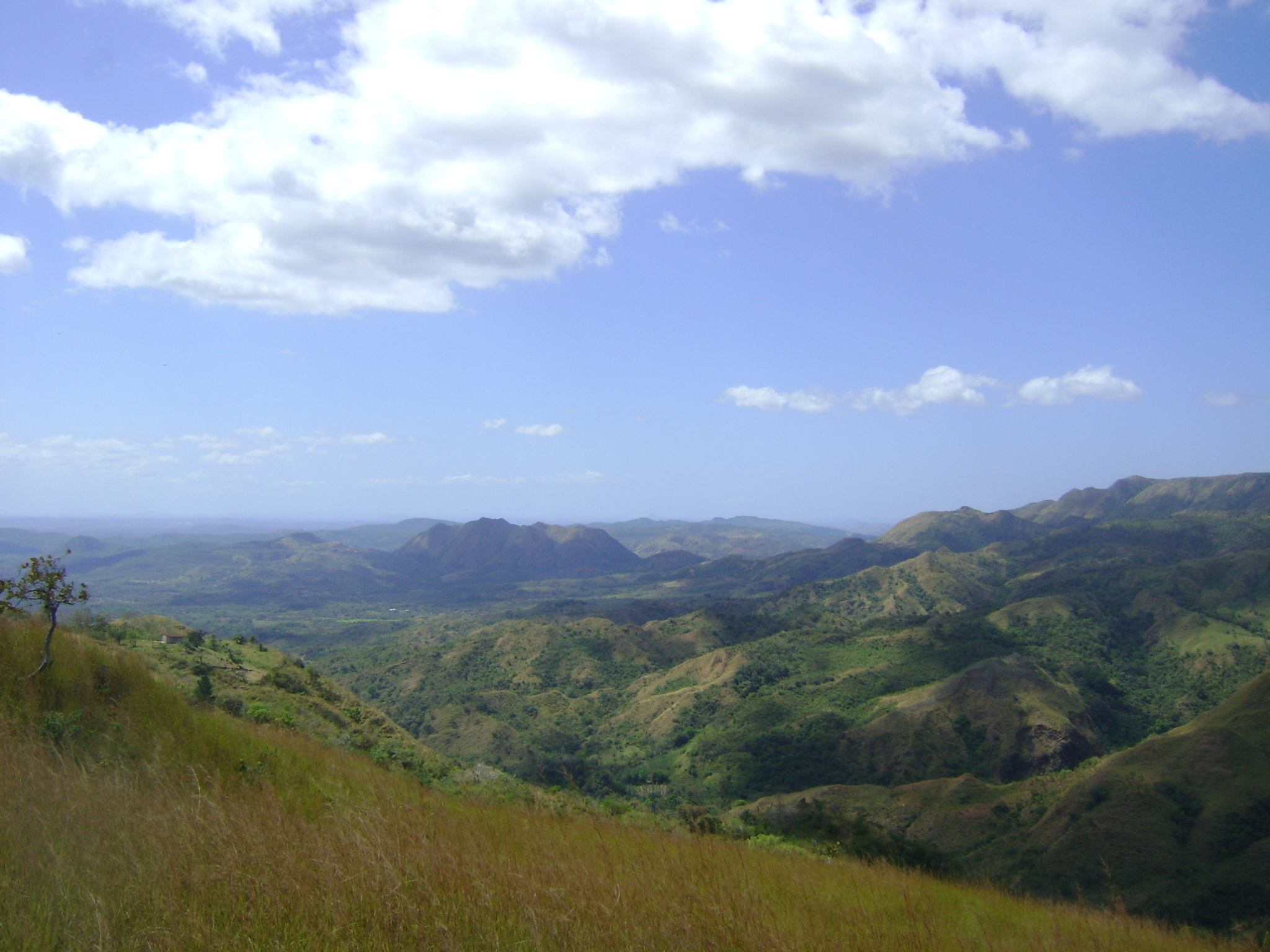
Llanura La Mochila in La Yeguada, Veraguas

Calobre is a town and corregimiento in Calobre District, Veraguas Province, Panama with a population of 2,514 as of 2010. It is the seat of Calobre District.
