= Cañazas District =

- District

- Location of the district capital in Panama
- Coordinates: 8°19′12″N 81°12′36″W
- Country: Panama
- Province: Veraguas Province
- Capital: Cañazas

Area
  - Total: 305 sq mi (789 km^{2})

Population (2019)
  - Total: 18,022
  - Density: 59.2/sq mi (22.8/km^{2})
- official estimate
- Time zone: UTC-5 (ETZ)

Cañazas District is a district (distrito) of Veraguas Province in Panama. The population according to the 2000 census was 15,999; the latest official estimate (for 2019) is 18,022. The district covers a total area of 789 km^{2}. The capital lies at the town of Cañazas.

== History ==
Cañazas was founded in 1757 under the name of San Francisco Javier de Cañazo. Since the Spaniards established the custom of naming the places they arrived, the named the town after the saint on arriving on 3 December, which is the feast day. It is assumed that the name of Cañazo arose from the surrounding mountains. The first school was established in Cañazo in 1853.

In 1783, Indians attacked and devastated the population of Cañazo and other peoples of Veraguas Province and Chiriquí Province. In 1912, they constructed the tower and temple, with much work carried out by Juan Bautista Brea. Today, there is a new tower and a church completely restored after the fall of the old tower. On August 16, 1963, the Pan-American Highway established links to Cañazo. On December 28, 1971, General Omar Torrijos Herrera signed the contract for the construction of an asphalt road to Cañazo. On May 11, 1974, it was opened by Demetrio Basilio Lakas, and the minister of public works of that time, Edwin Fabrega. The honor of cutting the ribbon was awarded to Peter J. Mérida, a distinguished citizen of the district of Cañazo.

== Administrative divisions ==
Cañazas District is divided administratively into the following corregimientos:

- San Francisco Javier de Cañazas
- Cerro de Plata
- Los Valles
- San Marcelo
- El Picador
- San José
- El Aromillo
- Las Cruces
