= Catorce (disambiguation) =

Catorce is a municipality in San Luis Potosí, Mexico.

Catorce (Spanish "Fourteen") may also refer to:

== Geography ==
- Real de Catorce, village in Mexico
- Río Uxpanapa (Poblado Catorce) in Uxpanapa, Mexico
- Catorce de Noviembre, Panama
- La Catorce, area of parish Buena Fe, Ríos Province, Ecuador
- "La Catorce", department store in Centro Comercial Llanogrande Plaza, Palmira, Valle del Cauca, Colombia
- Catorce de Julio, springs at Sensuntepeque in the Cabañas department of El Salvador
- La Catorce, barrio in Puerto Barrios, Guatemala

== People ==
- "El Catorce" Victoriano Ramírez (1888–1929), Mexican general of the Cristero War

== Media ==
- Canal Catorce, a Mexican public television network
- XHERS-FM, Radio Catorce, S.A.

== Other ==
- La Catorce, novel by Pedro Mata Domínguez
