= Peperomia tutensis =

Scientific classification
- Kingdom: Plantae
- Clade: Embryophytes
- Clade: Tracheophytes
- Clade: Angiosperms
- Clade: Magnoliids
- Order: Piperales
- Family: Piperaceae
- Genus: Peperomia
- Species: P. tutensis

Binomial name
- Peperomia tutensis Callejas

Species of epiphyte

Peperomia tutensis is a species of epiphyte in the genus Peperomia. It was first described by Ricardo Callejas and published in the book ":Flora Mesoamericana 2(2): 469–470, 104, t. 26. 2020". It primarily grows on wet tropical biomes. The species name came from Cerro Tute, where first specimens of this species were collected. It is endemic to Panama. First specimens where found at an altitude of 1000 meters in Cerro Tute, Veraguas.
