= MPSA =

MPSA may refer to:

- Malta Pharmaceutical Students' Association
- Medium Power Small Arms protection rating against bullets from small arms
- Metropolitan Police's Sikh Association
- Midwest Political Science Association
- Mississippi Private School Association, previous name of the Mississippi Association of Independent Schools
- Mobile Payment Services Association
- Ruben Cantu Airport, the ICAO code for the airport in Panama
