= Calobre District =

- District

- Location of the district capital in Panama
- Coordinates: 8°19′12″N 80°50′24″W
- Country: Panama
- Province: Veraguas Province
- Capital: Calobre

Area
  - Total: 311 sq mi (806 km^{2})

Population (2019)
  - Total: 12,159
- official estimate
- Time zone: UTC-5 (ETZ)

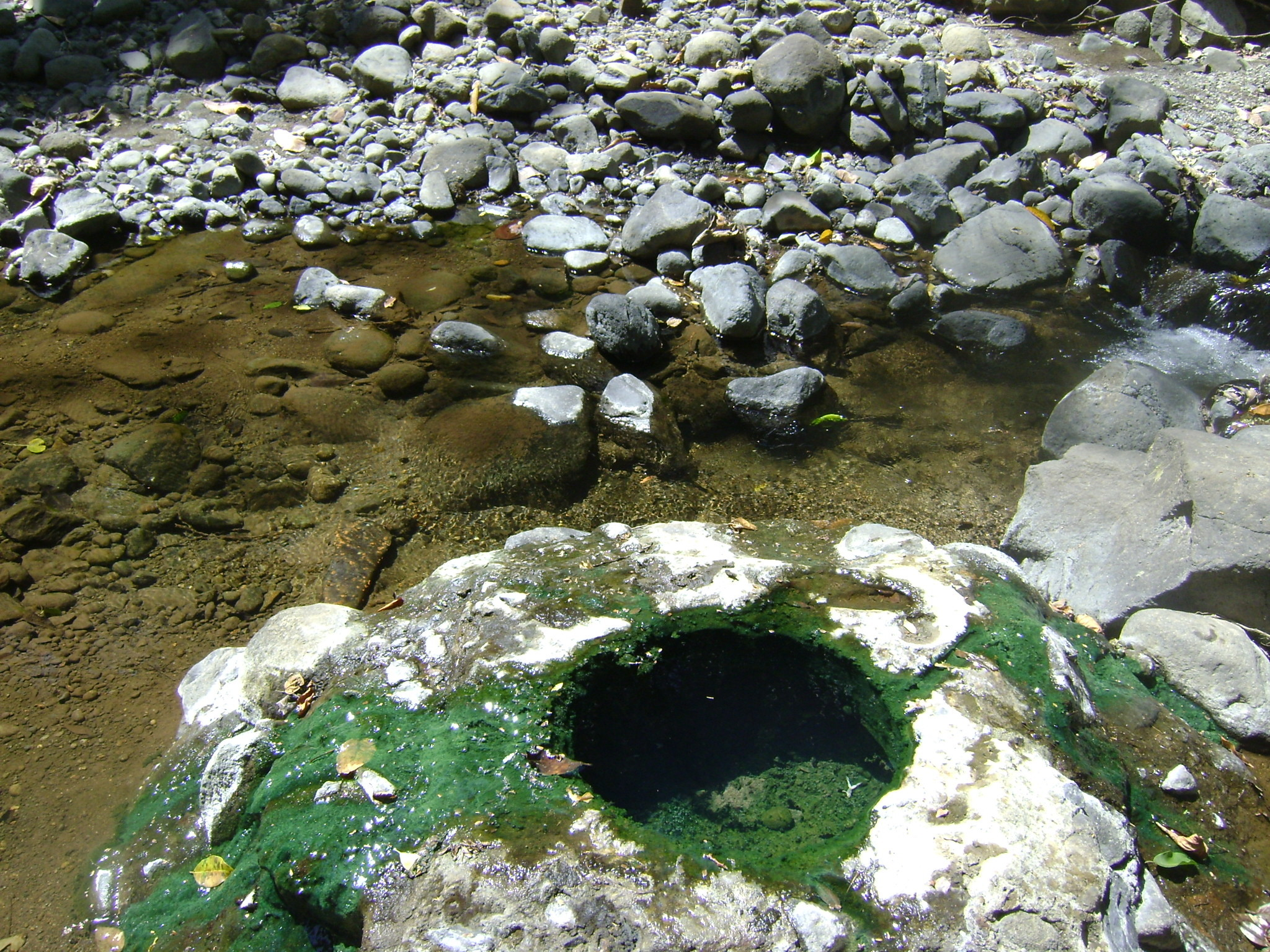
La Mochila thermal springs

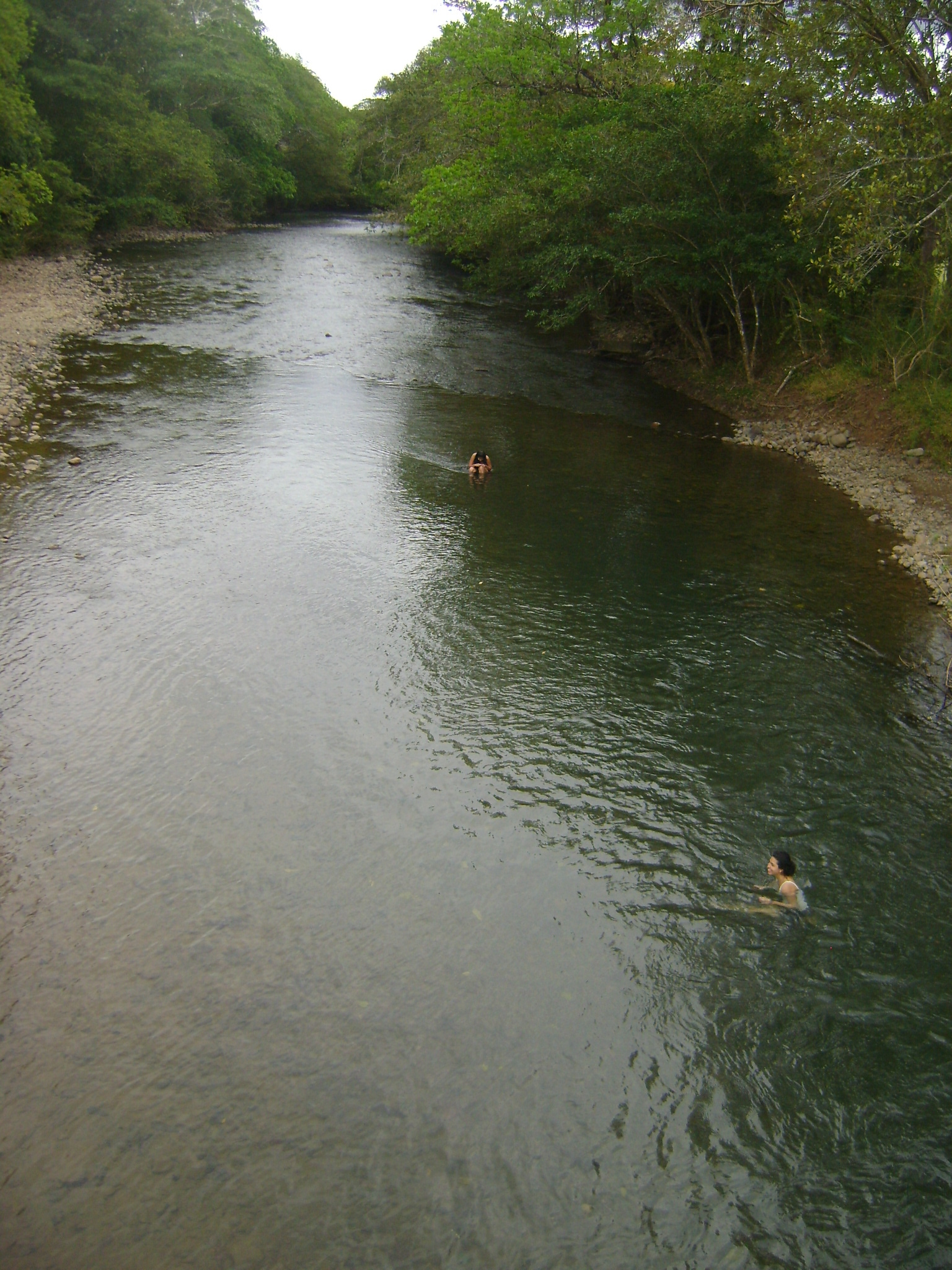
La Mochila River

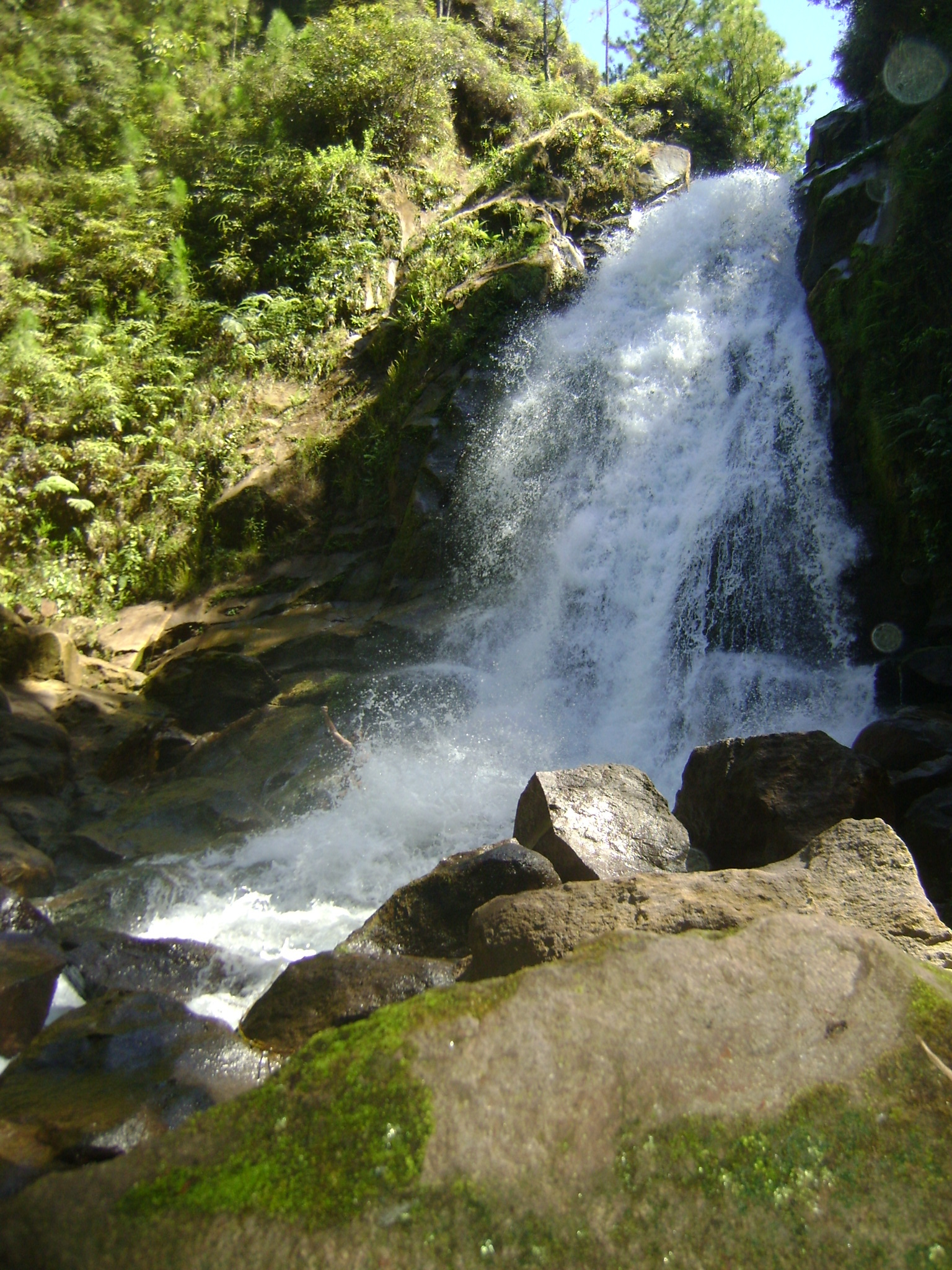
Waterfall in La Yeguada, Veraguas

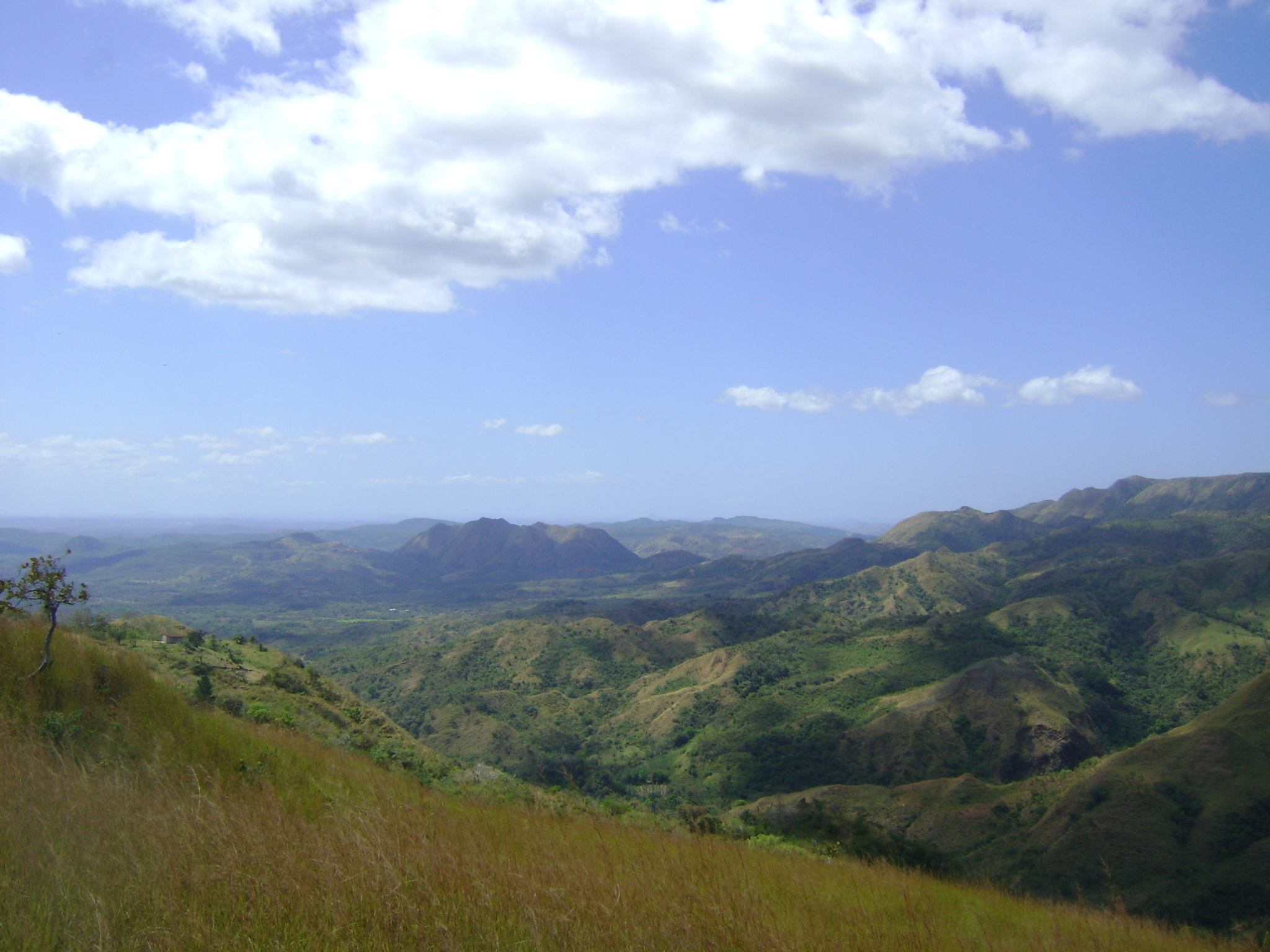
Llanura La Mochila in La Yeguada, Veraguas

Calobre District is a district (distrito) of Veraguas Province in Panama. The population according to the 2000 census was 12,184; the latest official estimate (for 2019) ia 12,159. The district covers a total area of 806 km^{2}. The capital lies at the town of Calobre.

== Administrative divisions ==
Calobre District is divided administratively into the following corregimientos:

- Calobre
- Barnizal
- Chitra
- El Cocla
- El Potrero
- La Laguna
- La Raya de Calobre
- La Tetilla
- La Yeguada
- Las Guías
- Monjarás
- San José
