= La Carrillo =

- Corregimiento
- Location within Panama
- Coordinates: 7°58′00″N 80°53′00″W
- Country: Panama
- Province: Veraguas
- District: Atalaya
- Established: July 29, 1998

Area
  - Land: 39.3 km^{2} (15.2 sq mi)

Population (2010)
  - Total: 630
  - Density: 16/km^{2} (41/sq mi)
- Population density calculated based on land area.
- Time zone: UTC−5 (EST)

La Carrillo is a corregimiento in Atalaya District, Veraguas Province, Panama with a population of 630 as of 2010. It was created by Law 58 of July 29, 1998, owing to the Declaration of Unconstitutionality of Law 1 of 1982. Its population as of 2000 was 750.
