= Barnizal =

Coordinates: 8.4167°N 80.7667°W

- Corregimiento
- Location within Panama
- Country: Panama
- Province: Veraguas
- District: Calobre

Area
  - Land: 26.2 km^{2} (10.1 sq mi)

Population (2010)
  - Total: 435
  - Density: 16.6/km^{2} (43/sq mi)
- Population density calculated based on land area.
- Time zone: UTC−5 (EST)

Barnizal is a corregimiento in Calobre District, Veraguas Province, Panama with a population of 435 as of 2010. Its population as of 1990 was 521; its population as of 2000 was 502.
