= El Rincón, Veraguas =

Coordinates: 8.1833°N 81.4333°W

El Rincón
- Corregimiento
- Location within Panama
- Country: Panama
- Province: Veraguas
- District: Las Palmas

Area
  - Land: 82.7 km^{2} (31.9 sq mi)

Population (2010)
  - Total: 2,574
  - Density: 31.1/km^{2} (81/sq mi)
- Population density calculated based on land area.
- Time zone: UTC−5 (EST)

El Rincón is a corregimiento in Las Palmas District, Veraguas Province, Panama with a population of 2,574 as of 2010. Its population as of 1990 was 2,118; its population as of 2000 was 2,441.
