= La Mesa, Veraguas =

Coordinates: 8.1500°N 81.1833°W

La Mesa
- Corregimiento
- Location within Panama
- Country: Panama
- Province: Veraguas
- District: La Mesa

Area
  - Land: 165.4 km^{2} (63.9 sq mi)

Population (2010)
  - Total: 3,338
  - Density: 20.2/km^{2} (52/sq mi)
- Population density calculated based on land area.
- Time zone: UTC−5 (EST)
- Climate: Am

La Mesa is a corregimiento in La Mesa District, Veraguas Province, Panama with a population of 3,338 as of 2010. It is the seat of La Mesa District. Its population as of 1990 was 4,425; its population as of 2000 was 4,513.
