= Las Guías =

- Corregimiento
- Location within Panama
- Country: Panama
- Province: Veraguas
- District: Calobre

Area
  - Land: 93 km^{2} (36 sq mi)

Population (2010)
  - Total: 1,712
  - Density: 18.4/km^{2} (48/sq mi)
- Population density calculated based on land area.
- Time zone: UTC−5 (EST)

Las Guías is a corregimiento in the Calobre District, Veraguas Province, Panama with a population of 1,712 as of 2010. The population in 1990 was 1,789, and in 2000, it was 1,745.
