= La Montañuela =

Coordinates: 8.3167°N 80.9833°W

- Corregimiento
- Location within Panama
- Country: Panama
- Province: Veraguas
- District: Atalaya

Area
  - Land: 27.6 km^{2} (10.7 sq mi)

Population (2010)
  - Total: 786
  - Density: 28.5/km^{2} (74/sq mi)
- Population density calculated based on land area.
- Time zone: UTC−5 (EST)

La Montañuela is a corregimiento in Atalaya District, Veraguas Province, Panama with a population of 786 as of 2010. Its population was 736 in 2000 and 745 in 1990.
