= San Pedro del Espino =

Coordinates: 8.1333°N 81.0833°W

- Corregimiento
- Location within Panama
- Country: Panama
- Province: Veraguas
- District: Santiago

Area
  - Land: 22.5 km^{2} (8.7 sq mi)

Population (2010)
  - Total: 1,629
  - Density: 72.4/km^{2} (188/sq mi)
- Population density calculated based on land area.
- Time zone: UTC−5 (EST)

San Pedro del Espino is a corregimiento in Santiago District, Veraguas Province, Panama with a population of 1,629 as of 2010. Its population as of 1990 was 1,336; its population as of 2000 was 1,463.
