= La Mesa District =

- District

- Location of the district capital in Panama
- Coordinates: 8°9′N 81°11′W
- Country: Panama
- Province: Veraguas Province
- Capital: La Mesa

Area
  - Total: 197 sq mi (511 km^{2})

Population (2019)
  - Total: 12,052
  - Density: 61.1/sq mi (23.6/km^{2})
- official estimate
- Time zone: UTC-5 (ETZ)

La Mesa District is a district (distrito) of Veraguas Province in Panama. The population according to the 2000 census was 11,746; the latest official estimate (for 2019) is 12,052. The district covers a total area of 511 km^{2}. The capital lies at the town of La Mesa.

== Administrative divisions ==
La Mesa District is divided administratively into the following corregimientos:

- La Mesa
- Bisvalles
- Boró
- Llano Grande
- San Bartolo
- Los Milagros
- El Higo
