= Boró =

Coordinates: 8.1667°N 81.3000°W

- Corregimiento
- Location within Panama
- Country: Panama
- Province: Veraguas
- District: La Mesa

Area
  - Land: 71.7 km^{2} (27.7 sq mi)

Population (2010)
  - Total: 1,757
  - Density: 24.5/km^{2} (63/sq mi)
- Population density calculated based on land area.
- Time zone: UTC−5 (EST)

Boró is a corregimiento in La Mesa District, Veraguas Province, Panama with a population of 1,757 as of 2010. Its population as of 1990 was 2,158; its population as of 2000 was 1,959.
