= Pilón, Panama =

Pilón
- Corregimiento
- Location within Panama
- Coordinates: 7.9567°N 81.0742°W
- Country: Panama
- Province: Veraguas
- District: Montijo

Area
  - Land: 5.1 km^{2} (2.0 sq mi)

Population (2010)
  - Total: 890
  - Density: 174/km^{2} (450/sq mi)
- Population density calculated based on land area.
- Time zone: UTC−5 (EST)

Pilón is a corregimiento in Montijo District, Veraguas Province, Panama with a population of 890 as of 2010. Its population as of 1990 was 505; its population as of 2000 was 541.
