= San Bartolo, Veraguas =

Coordinates: 8.2167°N 81.2667°W

San Bartolo
- Corregimiento
- Location within Panama
- Country: Panama
- Province: Veraguas
- District: La Mesa

Area
  - Land: 97.4 km^{2} (37.6 sq mi)

Population (2010)
  - Total: 2,440
  - Density: 25.1/km^{2} (65/sq mi)
- Population density calculated based on land area.
- Time zone: UTC−5 (EST)

San Bartolo is a corregimiento in La Mesa District, Veraguas Province, Panama with a population of 2,440 as of 2010. Its population as of 1990 was 2,411 and as of 2000, it was 2,351.
