= List of volcanoes in Panama =

This is a list of active and extinct volcanoes in Panama.

Name	Elevation		Location	Last eruption
Name	meters	feet	Coordinates	Last eruption
Barú	3,474	11,397	8.808°N 82.543°W	1550
El Valle	1,185	3,888	8.58°N 80.17°W	Holocene
La Yeguada	1,297	4,255	8.47°N 80.82°W	1620
Tisingal	2,986	9,797	8.88°N 82.67°W	Pleistocene

== See also ==
- Central America Volcanic Arc
- List of volcanoes in Costa Rica
