= Carlos Santana Ávila =

- Corregimiento
- Location within Panama
- Coordinates: 8.3167°N 81.0333°W
- Country: Panama
- Province: Veraguas
- District: Santiago
- Established: November 22, 2002

Area
  - Land: 67.6 km^{2} (26.1 sq mi)

Population (2010)
  - Total: 4,059
  - Density: 60/km^{2} (160/sq mi)
- Population density calculated based on land area.
- Time zone: UTC−5 (EST)

Carlos Santana Ávila is a corregimiento in Santiago District, Veraguas Province, Panama with a population of 4,059 as of 2010. It was created by Law 53 of November 22, 2002.
