= Los Valles, Panama =

Coordinates: 8.4333°N 81.2000°W

Los Valles
- Corregimiento
- Location within Panama
- Country: Panama
- Province: Veraguas
- District: Cañazas

Area
  - Land: 81.7 km^{2} (31.5 sq mi)

Population (2010)
  - Total: 1,200
  - Density: 14.7/km^{2} (38/sq mi)
- Population density calculated based on land area.
- Time zone: UTC−5 (EST)

Los Valles is a corregimiento in Cañazas District, Veraguas Province, Panama with a population of 1,200 as of 2010. Its population as of 1990 was 2,045; its population as of 2000 was 1,245.
