= Los Milagros =

- Corregimiento
- Country: Panama
- Province: Veraguas
- District: La Mesa
- Established: June 5, 2002

Area
  - Land: 35 km^{2} (14 sq mi)

Population (2010)
  - Total: 1,096
  - Density: 31.3/km^{2} (81/sq mi)
- Population density calculated based on land area.
- Time zone: UTC−5 (EST)

Los Milagros is a corregimiento in La Mesa District, Veraguas Province, Panama with a population of 1,096 as of 2010. It was created by Law 27 of June 5, 2002.
