= Monjarás =

Coordinates: 8.3833°N 80.8667°W

- Corregimiento
- Location within Panama
- Country: Panama
- Province: Veraguas
- District: Calobre

Area
  - Land: 43.1 km^{2} (16.6 sq mi)

Population (2010)
  - Total: 585
  - Density: 13.6/km^{2} (35/sq mi)
- Population density calculated based on land area.
- Time zone: UTC−5 (EST)

Monjarás is a corregimiento in Calobre District, Veraguas Province, Panama with a population of 585 as of 2010. Its population as of 1990 was 580; its population as of 2000 was 569.
