= Las Palmas District =

- District

- Location of the district capital in Panama
- Coordinates: 7°59′N 81°34′W
- Country: Panama
- Province: Veraguas Province
- Capital: Las Palmas

Area
  - Total: 392 sq mi (1,015 km^{2})

Population (2019)
  - Total: 18,493
  - Density: 47.19/sq mi (18.22/km^{2})
- official estimate
- Time zone: UTC-5 (ETZ)

Las Palmas District is a district (distrito) of Veraguas Province in Panama. The population according to the 2000 census was 17,924; the latest official estimate (for 2019) is 18,493. The district covers a total area of 1,015 km^{2}. The capital lies at the town of Las Palmas.

== Administrative divisions ==
Las Palmas District is divided administratively into the following corregimientos:

- Las Palmas
- Cerro de Casa
- Corozal
- El María
- El Prado
- El Rincón
- Lolá
- Pixvae
- Puerto Vidal
- Zapotillo
- San Martín de Porres
- Viguí
- Manuel Encarnación Amador Terreros (created in 2012)
