= San Francisco District, Panama =

San Francisco District
- District
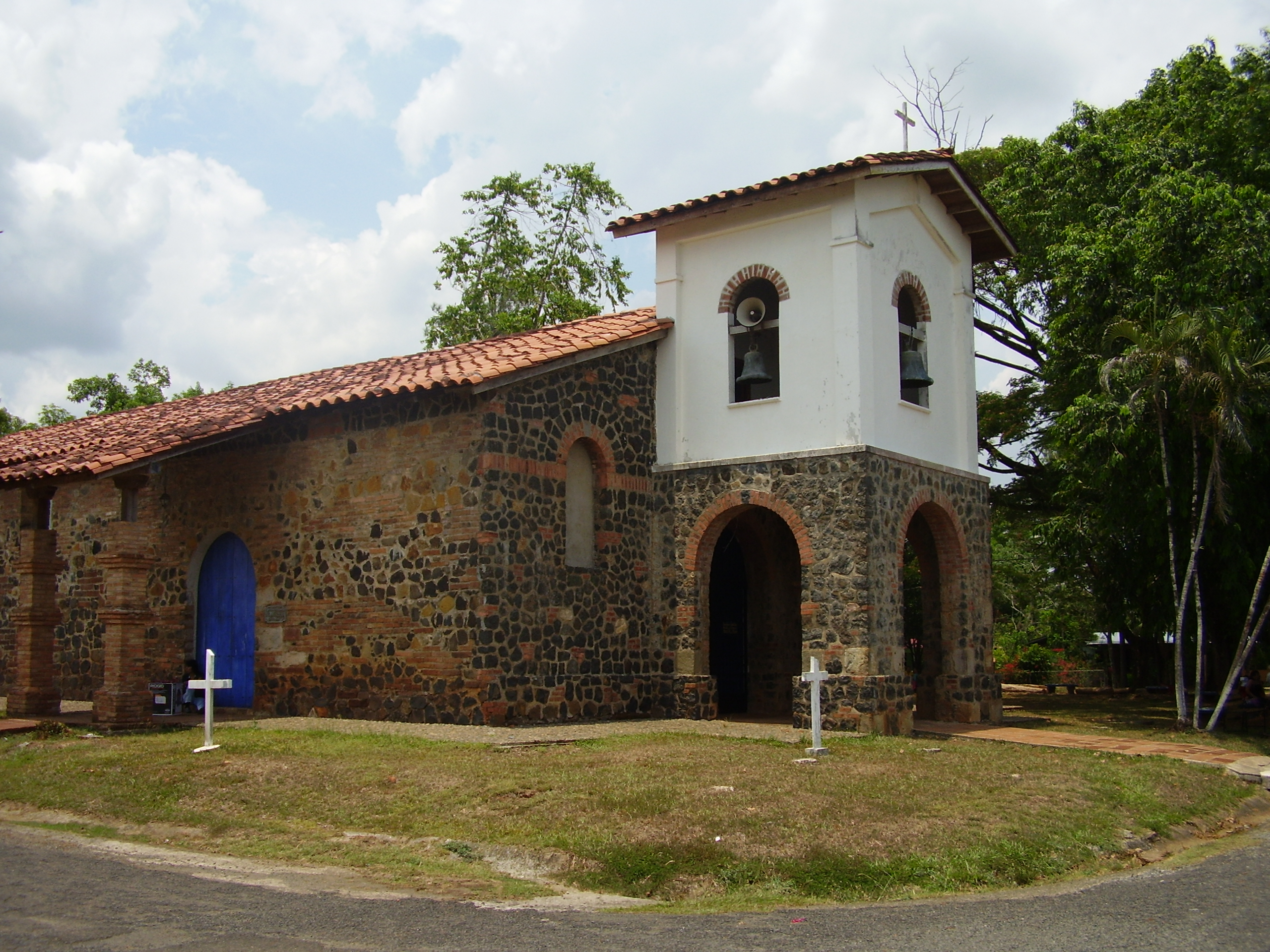
- Church in the town of San Francisco.

- Location of the district capital in Panama
- Coordinates: 8°16′N 80°58′W
- Country: Panama
- Province: Veraguas Province
- Capital: San Francisco

Area
  - Total: 169 sq mi (437 km^{2})

Population (2019)
  - Total: 10,536
  - Density: 62.4/sq mi (24.1/km^{2})
- official estimate
- Time zone: UTC-5 (ETZ)

San Francisco District is a district (distrito) of Veraguas Province in Panama. The population according to the 2010 Panamanian census was 9,881; the latest official estimate (for 2019) is 10,536. The district covers a total area of 437 km^{2}. The capital lies at the town of San Francisco.

== Administrative divisions ==
San Francisco District is divided administratively into the following corregimientos:

- San Francisco de la Montaña
- Corral Falso
- Los Hatillos
- Remance
- San Juan
- San José
