= Manuel E. Amador Terreros, Veraguas =

Manuel E. Amador Terreros
- Corregimiento
- Location within Panama
- Country: Panama
- Province: Veraguas
- District: Las Palmas
- Established: March 10, 2012
- Population density calculated based on land area.
- Time zone: UTC5 (EST)

Manuel E. Amador Terreros is a corregimiento in Las Palmas District, Veraguas Province, Panama.
