= Costa Hermosa =

- Corregimiento
- Country: Panama
- Province: Veraguas
- District: Montijo
- Established: April 30, 2003

Area
  - Land: 20.5 km^{2} (7.9 sq mi)

Population (2010)
  - Total: 1,550
  - Density: 75.7/km^{2} (196/sq mi)
- Population density calculated based on land area.
- Time zone: UTC−5 (EST)

Costa Hermosa is a corregimiento in Montijo District, Veraguas Province, Panama with a population of 1,550 as of 2010. It was created by Law 42 of April 30, 2003.
