= La Yeguada (corregimiento) =

Coordinates: 8.4500°N 80.8667°W

- Corregimiento
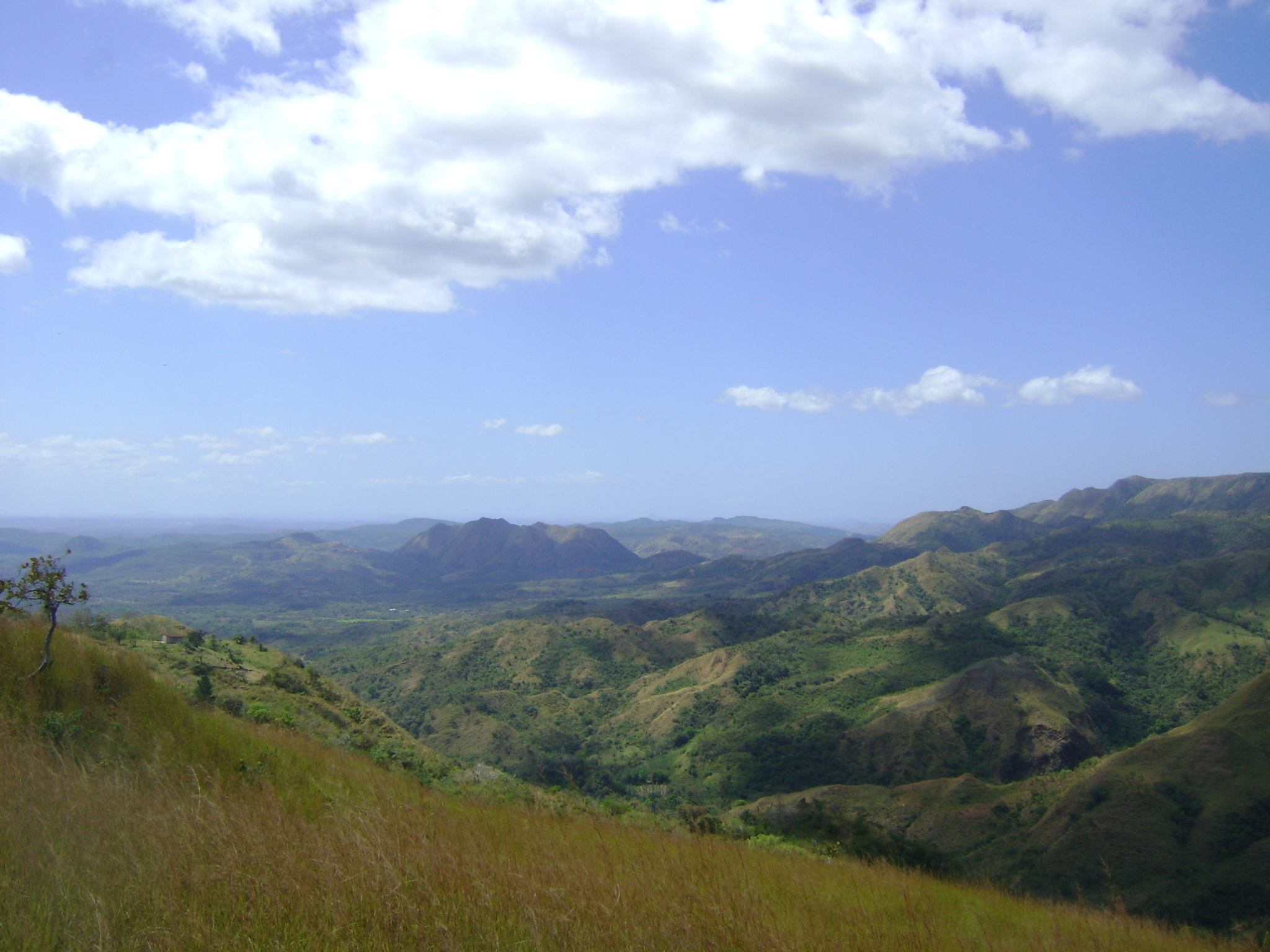

- Location within Panama
- Country: Panama
- Province: Veraguas
- District: Calobre

Area
  - Land: 131.6 km^{2} (50.8 sq mi)

Population (2010)
  - Total: 1,353
  - Density: 10.3/km^{2} (27/sq mi)
- Population density calculated based on land area.
- Time zone: UTC−5 (EST)

La Yeguada is a corregimiento in Calobre District, Veraguas Province, Panama with a population of 1,353 as of 2010. Its population as of 1990 was 1,379; its population as of 2000 was 1,444.
