= La Tetilla =

Coordinates: 8.2500°N 80.8833°W

- Corregimiento
- Location within Panama
- Country: Panama
- Province: Veraguas
- District: Calobre

Area
  - Land: 54 km^{2} (21 sq mi)

Population (2010)
  - Total: 400
  - Density: 7.4/km^{2} (19/sq mi)
- Population density calculated based on land area.
- Time zone: UTC−5 (EST)

La Tetilla is a corregimiento in Calobre District, Veraguas Province, Panama with a population of 400 as of 2010. Its population as of 1990 was 419; its population as of 2000 was 387.
