= Cañazas =

- Corregimiento
- Location within Panama
- Coordinates: 8°19′12″N 81°12′36″W
- Country: Panama
- Province: Veraguas
- District: Cañazas

Area
  - Land: 89.3 km^{2} (34.5 sq mi)

Population (2010)
  - Total: 4,836
  - Density: 54.2/km^{2} (140/sq mi)
- Population density calculated based on land area.
- Time zone: UTC−5 (EST)

Cañazas is a corregimiento in Cañazas District, Veraguas Province, Panama, with a population of 4,836 as of 2010. It is the seat of Cañazas District. Its population as of 1990 was 8,015; its population as of 2000 was 5,346.

An extinct, unclassified indigenous language known as Urraca or Esquegua was spoken just north of the modern city of Cañazas, Panama. (See List of unclassified languages of South America#Northern Andes.)

== Climate ==
Climate data for Cañazas 2001–2015
Month	Jan	Feb	Mar	Apr	May	Jun	Jul	Aug	Sep	Oct	Nov	Dec	Year
Mean daily maximum °C (°F)	32.3 (90.1)	33.0 (91.4)	33.6 (92.5)	33.9 (93.0)	32.4 (90.3)	31.4 (88.5)	31.3 (88.3)	31.3 (88.3)	31.2 (88.2)	30.4 (86.7)	30.8 (87.4)	31.6 (88.9)	31.9 (89.5)
Daily mean °C (°F)	26.2 (79.2)	26.8 (80.2)	27.3 (81.1)	27.9 (82.2)	27.4 (81.3)	26.8 (80.2)	26.7 (80.1)	26.6 (79.9)	26.6 (79.9)	26.2 (79.2)	26.3 (79.3)	26.1 (79.0)	26.7 (80.1)
Mean daily minimum °C (°F)	20.2 (68.4)	20.7 (69.3)	21.1 (70.0)	21.8 (71.2)	22.4 (72.3)	22.2 (72.0)	22.0 (71.6)	21.8 (71.2)	21.9 (71.4)	22.0 (71.6)	21.8 (71.2)	20.7 (69.3)	21.6 (70.8)
Average rainfall mm (inches)	23.0 (0.91)	5.4 (0.21)	38.5 (1.52)	98.7 (3.89)	328.6 (12.94)	348.9 (13.74)	272.8 (10.74)	383.9 (15.11)	461.1 (18.15)	469.5 (18.48)	298.5 (11.75)	98.8 (3.89)	2,827.7 (111.33)
Source 1: INEC
Source 2: IMHPA
