= Gobernadora =

Coordinates: 7.5625°N 81.2039°W

- Corregimiento
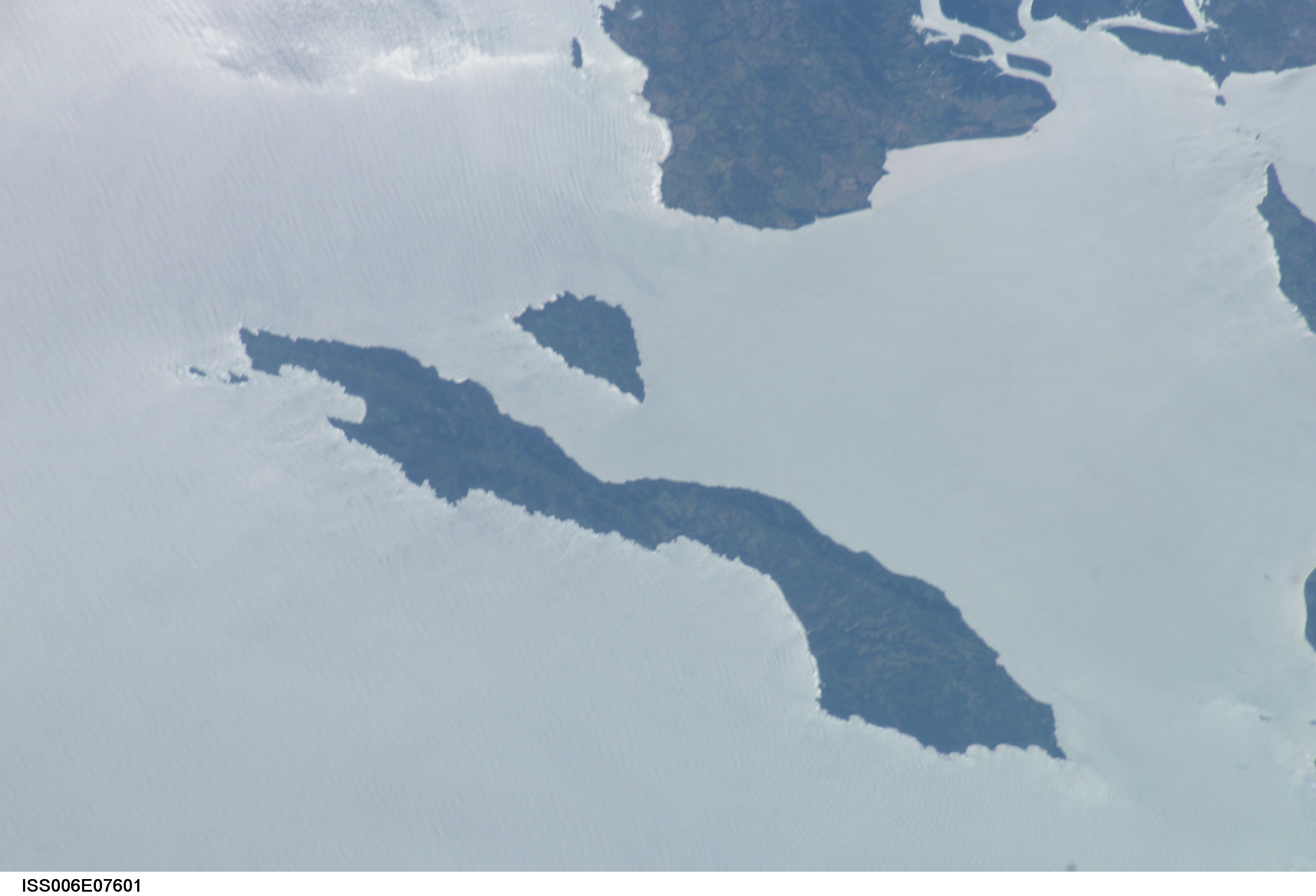

- Location within Panama
- Country: Panama
- Province: Veraguas
- District: Montijo

Area
  - Land: 536.9 km^{2} (207.3 sq mi)

Population (2010)
  - Total: 269
  - Density: 0.5/km^{2} (1.3/sq mi)
- Population density calculated based on land area.
- Time zone: UTC−5 (EST)

Gobernadora is a corregimiento and island in Montijo District, Veraguas Province, Panama with a population of 269 as of 2010. Its population in 1990 was 1,785; its population in 2000 was 1,114.
