= Los Hatillos =

Coordinates: 8.3167°N 80.9833°W

- Corregimiento
- Location within Panama
- Country: Panama
- Province: Veraguas
- District: San Francisco

Area
  - Land: 109 km^{2} (42 sq mi)

Population (2010)
  - Total: 1,365
  - Density: 12.5/km^{2} (32/sq mi)
- Population density calculated based on land area.
- Time zone: UTC−5 (EST)

Los Hatillos is a corregimiento in San Francisco District, Veraguas Province, Panama with a population of 1,365 as of 2010. Its population as of 1990 was 1,472; its population as of 2000 was 1,442.
