= Los Castillos, Veraguas =

Los Castillos
- Corregimiento
- Location within Panama
- Coordinates: 8°01′23″N 81°06′59″W
- Country: Panama
- Province: Veraguas
- District: Río de Jesús

Area
  - Land: 17.6 km^{2} (6.8 sq mi)

Population (2010)
  - Total: 552
  - Density: 31.3/km^{2} (81/sq mi)
- Population density calculated based on land area.
- Time zone: UTC−5 (EST)

Los Castillos is a corregimiento in Río de Jesús District, Veraguas Province, Panama with a population of 552 as of 2010.

== Demographics ==
Los Castillos' population as of 1990 was 553, and had grown to 582 by 2000.
