= Río de Jesús District =

- District

- Location of the district capital in Panama
- Coordinates: 7°58′48″N 81°9′0″W
- Country: Panama
- Province: Veraguas Province
- Capital: Río de Jesús

Area
  - Total: 117 sq mi (302 km^{2})

Population (2019)
  - Total: 5,501
  - Density: 47.2/sq mi (18.2/km^{2})
- official estimate
- Time zone: UTC-5 (ETZ)

Río de Jesús District is a district (distrito) of Veraguas Province in Panama. The population according to the 2000 census was 5,256; the latest official estimate (for 2019) is 5,501. The district covers a total area of 302 km^{2}. The capital lies at the town of Río de Jesús.

== Administrative divisions ==
Río de Jesús District is divided administratively into the following corregimientos:

- La Ermita de Río de Jesús
- Catorce de Noviembre
- Las Huacas
- Los Castillos
- Utira
- Nuevo San Juan (created in 2012)
