= Raya =

Raya may refer to:

== People and characters ==
=== Given name ===
- Raya (given name), includes a list of people with the name
- Raya and Sakina, Egyptian serial killers

=== Surname ===
- David Raya, Spanish footballer
- Javier Raya (born 1991), Spanish figure skater
- Joseph Raya, Melkite Greek Catholic archbishop
- Krishnadeva Raya, Vijayanagara Emperor, South India
- Marco Raya (born 2002), American baseball player

=== Fictional characters ===
- Raya (Smallville), a fictional character in the TV series Smallville
- Raya (Disney character), the protagonist of the 2021 film Raya and the Last Dragon

== Places ==
- Raya (country subdivision), administrative unit of the Ottoman Empire
- Raya, Nepal, a village in NW Nepal
- Raya, Uttar Pradesh, India
- Raya, Simalungun, a town in Indonesia
- Raya Azebo, a woreda in Ethiopia

== Other uses ==
- Raya (ራያ ቢራ), a brand of beer sold in Ethiopia
- Raya, title of a monarch, a cognate of raja
- Raya (app), a dating app
- Raya (film), an upcoming film
- Raya (novel) (2018), a work of historical fiction by Mahsa Rahmani Noble

== See also ==
- Hari Raya or Eid al-Fitr, a religious holiday celebrated by Muslims
- Indonesia Raya, a national anthem of Indonesia
- Raisa (disambiguation)
- Raja (disambiguation)
- La Raya (disambiguation)
- Raya and the Last Dragon, a 2021 Disney animated film
- Rayah, a member of the tax-paying lower class in the Ottoman Empire
