= Leones, Veraguas =

Coordinates: 7.7528°N 81.1164°W

Leones
- Corregimiento
- Location within Panama
- Country: Panama
- Province: Veraguas
- District: Montijo

Area
  - Land: 18.7 km^{2} (7.2 sq mi)

Population (2010)
  - Total: 224
  - Density: 12/km^{2} (31/sq mi)
- Population density calculated based on land area.
- Time zone: UTC−5 (EST)

Leones is a corregimiento in Montijo District, Veraguas Province, Panama with a population of 224 as of 2010. Its population as of 1990 was 284; its population as of 2000 was 297. As of 2010, it had a population of 224.
