= El Picador =

Coordinates: 8.3500°N 81.2500°W

- Corregimiento
- Location within Panama
- Country: Panama
- Province: Veraguas
- District: Cañazas
- Established: March 7, 1997

Area
  - Land: 161.9 km^{2} (62.5 sq mi)

Population (2010)
  - Total: 3,065
  - Density: 18.9/km^{2} (49/sq mi)
- Population density calculated based on land area.
- Time zone: UTC−5 (EST)

El Picador is a corregimiento in Cañazas District, Veraguas Province, Panama with a population of 3,065 as of 2010. It was created by Law 10 of March 7, 1997; this measure was complemented by Law 5 of January 19, 1998 and Law 69 of October 28, 1998. Its population as of 2000 was 3,089.
