= San Marcelo =

Coordinates: 8.2667°N 81.1500°W

- Corregimiento
- Location within Panama
- Country: Panama
- Province: Veraguas
- District: Cañazas

Area
  - Land: 78.6 km^{2} (30.3 sq mi)

Population (2010)
  - Total: 1,476
  - Density: 18.8/km^{2} (49/sq mi)
- Population density calculated based on land area.
- Time zone: UTC−5 (EST)

San Marcelo is a corregimiento in Cañazas District, Veraguas Province, Panama with a population of 1,476 as of 2010. Its population as of 1990 was 3,277; its population as of 2000 was 2,998.
