= Los Algarrobos, Veraguas =

Los Algarrobos
- Corregimiento
- Location within Panama
- Coordinates: 8.1167°N 81.0167°W
- Country: Panama
- Province: Veraguas
- District: Santiago
- Established: July 29, 1998

Area
  - Land: 63.4 km^{2} (24.5 sq mi)

Population (2010)
  - Total: 5,490
  - Density: 86.6/km^{2} (224/sq mi)
- Population density calculated based on land area.
- Time zone: UTC−5 (EST)

Los Algarrobos is a corregimiento in Santiago District, Veraguas Province, Panama with a population of 5,490 as of 2010. It was created by Law 58 of July 29, 1998, owing to the Declaration of Unconstitutionality of Law 1 of 1982. Its population as of 2000 was 4,623.
