= La Peña, Panama =

La Peña
- Corregimiento
- Location within Panama
- Coordinates: 8.1333°N 81.0333°W
- Country: Panama
- Province: Veraguas
- District: Santiago

Area
  - Land: 117.6 km^{2} (45.4 sq mi)

Population (2010)
  - Total: 3,990
  - Density: 33.9/km^{2} (88/sq mi)
- Population density calculated based on land area.
- Time zone: UTC−5 (EST)

La Peña is a corregimiento in Santiago District, Veraguas Province, Panama with a population of 3,990 as of 2010. Its population as of 1990 was 7,005; its population as of 2000 was 3,746.
