= Llano Grande, Veraguas =

Coordinates: 8.1833°N 81.3167°W

Llano Grande
- Corregimiento
- Location within Panama
- Country: Panama
- Province: Veraguas
- District: La Mesa

Area
  - Land: 58 km^{2} (22 sq mi)

Population (2010)
  - Total: 815
  - Density: 14/km^{2} (36/sq mi)
- Population density calculated based on land area.
- Time zone: UTC−5 (EST)

Llano Grande is a corregimiento in La Mesa District, Veraguas Province, Panama with a population of 815 as of 2010. Its population as of 1990 was 776; its population as of 2000 was 776.
