= La Colorada, Veraguas =

La Colorada
- Corregimiento
- Location within Panama
- Coordinates: 8.0167°N 80.9833°W
- Country: Panama
- Province: Veraguas
- District: Santiago

Area
  - Land: 65.2 km^{2} (25.2 sq mi)

Population (2010)
  - Total: 2,128
  - Density: 32.6/km^{2} (84/sq mi)
- Population density calculated based on land area.
- Time zone: UTC−5 (EST)

La Colorada is a corregimiento in Santiago District, Veraguas Province, Panama with a population of 2,128 as of 2010. Its population as of 1990 was 1,974; its population as of 2000 was 2,100.
