= El Cocla =

Coordinates: 8.3167°N 80.9167°W

- Corregimiento
- Location within Panama
- Country: Panama
- Province: Veraguas
- District: Calobre

Area
  - Land: 65.2 km^{2} (25.2 sq mi)

Population (2010)
  - Total: 608
  - Density: 9.3/km^{2} (24/sq mi)
- Population density calculated based on land area.
- Time zone: UTC−5 (EST)

El Cocla is a corregimiento in Calobre District, Veraguas Province, Panama with a population of 608 as of 2010. Its population as of 1990 was 608; its population as of 2000 was 597.
