= Canto del Llano =

- Corregimiento
- Location within Panama
- Coordinates: 8.1167°N 80.9667°W
- Country: Panama
- Province: Veraguas
- District: Santiago
- Established: January 7, 1993

Area
  - Land: 79.1 km^{2} (30.5 sq mi)

Population (2014)
  - Total: 25,627
  - Density: 323.98/km^{2} (839.1/sq mi)
- Population density calculated based on land area.
- Time zone: UTC−5 (EST)

Canto del Llano is a corregimiento in Santiago District, Veraguas Province, Panama with a population of 25,627 as of 2014. It was created by Law 1 of January 7, 1993. Its population as of 2000 was 23,654.
