= Bisvalles =

Coordinates: 8.1833°N 81.2167°W

- Corregimiento
- Location within Panama
- Country: Panama
- Province: Veraguas
- District: La Mesa

Area
  - Land: 83.4 km^{2} (32.2 sq mi)

Population (2010)
  - Total: 2,185
  - Density: 26.2/km^{2} (68/sq mi)
- Population density calculated based on land area.
- Time zone: UTC−5 (EST)

Bisvalles is a corregimiento in La Mesa District, Veraguas Province, Panama with a population of 2,185 as of 2010. Its population as of 1990 was 2,370; its population as of 2000 was 2,147.
