= Corral Falso =

Coordinates: 8.2000°N 80.8500°W

- Corregimiento
- Location within Panama
- Country: Panama
- Province: Veraguas
- District: San Francisco

Area
  - Land: 38 km^{2} (15 sq mi)

Population (2010)
  - Total: 469
  - Density: 12.3/km^{2} (32/sq mi)
- Population density calculated based on land area.
- Time zone: UTC−5 (EST)

Corral Falso is a corregimiento in San Francisco District, Veraguas Province, Panama with a population of 469 as of 2010. Its population as of 1990 was 416; its population as of 2000 was 401.
