= Viguí =

Coordinates: 8.3000°N 81.5000°W

- Corregimiento
- Location within Panama
- Country: Panama
- Province: Veraguas
- District: Las Palmas
- Established: March 7, 1997

Area
  - Land: 59.6 km^{2} (23.0 sq mi)

Population (2010)
  - Total: 964
  - Density: 16.2/km^{2} (42/sq mi)
- Population density calculated based on land area.
- Time zone: UTC−5 (EST)

Viguí is a corregimiento in Las Palmas District, Veraguas Province, Panama with a population of 964 as of 2010. It was created by Law 10 of March 7, 1997; this measure was complemented by Law 5 of January 19, 1998 and Law 69 of October 28, 1998. Its population as of 2000 was 929.

== Places ==
The following places are located in the corregimiento of Viguí:

- Asiento Bonito
- Bajo Cobre
- Barrigón
- Cabecera de Quebrada La Mona
- Cerro Grande
- Cerro Iguana
- Cerro Laja
- Cerro Negro or Piedra Negra
- El Aguacate
- El Caimito
- El Calixtro
- El Chumico
- El Hato
- El Jagua
- El Jobo
- El Mango
- El Marañón
- La Cucurucha
- La Mona
- Loma Alta
- Los Llanitos del Cobre
- Sahumerio
- San Martín
- Viguí
