= Zapotillo, Panama =

Coordinates: 8.0000°N 81.5167°W

Zapotillo
- Corregimiento
- Location within Panama
- Country: Panama
- Province: Veraguas
- District: Las Palmas

Area
  - Land: 196.6 km^{2} (75.9 sq mi)

Population (2010)
  - Total: 69
  - Density: 5.4/km^{2} (14/sq mi)
- Population density calculated based on land area.
- Time zone: UTC−5 (EST)

Zapotillo is a corregimiento in Las Palmas District, Veraguas Province, Panama with a population of 69 as of 2010. Its population as of 1990 was 69; its population as of 2000 was 69.
