= Unión del Norte =

- Corregimiento
- Country: Panama
- Province: Veraguas
- District: Montijo
- Established: April 30, 2003

Area
  - Land: 35.2 km^{2} (13.6 sq mi)

Population (2010)
  - Total: 697
  - Density: 19.8/km^{2} (51/sq mi)
- Population density calculated based on land area.
- Time zone: UTC−5 (EST)

Unión del Norte is a corregimiento in Montijo District, Veraguas Province, Panama with a population of 697 as of 2010. It was created by Law 42 of April 30, 2003.
