= Nuevo San Juan, Veraguas =

Nuevo San Juan
- Corregimiento
- Interactive map of Nuevo San Juan
- Coordinates: 8.312°N 81.016°W
- Country: Panama
- Provinces: Veraguas
- District: Río de Jesús
- Time zone: UTC−5 (EST)

Nuevo San Juan is a corregimiento in Veraguas Province in the Republic of Panama.
