= Lolá =

Coordinates: 8.1000°N 81.4667°W

- Corregimiento
- Location within Panama
- Country: Panama
- Province: Veraguas
- District: Las Palmas

Area
  - Land: 41.1 km^{2} (15.9 sq mi)

Population (2010)
  - Total: 946
  - Density: 23/km^{2} (60/sq mi)
- Population density calculated based on land area.
- Time zone: UTC−5 (EST)

Lolá is a corregimiento in Las Palmas District, Veraguas Province, Panama with a population of 946 as of 2010. Its population as of 1990 was 960; its population as of 2000 was 1,022.
