= Chitra, Panama =

Chitra
- Corregimiento
- Location within Panama
- Country: Panama
- Province: Veraguas
- District: Calobre

Area
  - Land: 109.7 km^{2} (42.4 sq mi)

Population (2010)
  - Total: 1,301
  - Density: 11.9/km^{2} (31/sq mi)
- Population density calculated based on land area.
- Time zone: UTC−5 (EST)

Chitra is a corregimiento in Calobre District, Veraguas Province, Panama with a population of 1,301 as of 2010. Its population as of 1990 was 1,967; its population as of 2000 was 1,604.
