= Pixvae =

Coordinates: 7.8311°N 81.5761°W

- Corregimiento
- Location within Panama
- Country: Panama
- Province: Veraguas
- District: Las Palmas

Area
  - Land: 79.2 km^{2} (30.6 sq mi)

Population (2010)
  - Total: 820
  - Density: 10.3/km^{2} (27/sq mi)
- Population density calculated based on land area.
- Time zone: UTC−5 (EST)

Pixvae is a corregimiento in Las Palmas District, Veraguas Province, Panama with a population of 820 as of 2010. Its population as of 1990 was 1,103; its population as of 2000 was 883. By 2020, Pixvae has reduced its population to 386.
