= Remance =

- Corregimiento
- Location within Panama
- Coordinates: 8.3167°N 81.0833°W
- Country: Panama
- Province: Veraguas
- District: San Francisco

Area
  - Land: 78.4 km^{2} (30.3 sq mi)

Population (2010)
  - Total: 1,618
  - Density: 20.6/km^{2} (53/sq mi)
- Population density calculated based on land area.
- Time zone: UTC−5 (EST)

Remance is a corregimiento in San Francisco District, Veraguas Province, Panama with a population of 1,618 as of 2010. Its population as of 1990 was 1,806; its population as of 2000 was 1,807.
