= St Martin's School =

St Martin's School or Saint Martin's School may refer to:

== Australia ==
- St Martin de Porres, Adelaide, a private school in South Australia

== Canada ==
- St. Martin Catholic Secondary School, a Catholic secondary school in Ontario

== Liberia ==
- St. Martin's Catholic High School, a secondary school in Gbarnga

== South Africa ==
- St. Martin's School (Rosettenville), a private school in Johannesburg

== United Kingdom ==
- St Martin's School, Brentwood, a secondary school in Essex, England
- St Martins C.E.P. School Folkestone, a Church of England primary school in Kent, England
- Saint Martin's School of Art, a former art college in London, merged in 1989 into Central Saint Martins
- St Martin-In-The-Fields High School for Girls, a Church of England girls' secondary school in London, England
- St Martins School Northwood, a private boys' school in London, England
- St Martin's Ampleforth, a preparatory school in North Yorkshire, England
- St Martin's School, Shropshire, an all-through school in Shropshire, England
- St Martin's Catholic Academy, a secondary school in Stoke Golding, Warwickshire, England

== United States ==
- St. Martin of Tours Catholic School, an elementary-middle school in Brentwood, Los Angeles, California
- Cristo Rey St. Martin College Prep, formerly St. Martin de Porres High School, a Catholic high school in Illinois
- St. Martin's Episcopal School, a private school in Louisiana
- St. Martin High School, a high school in Mississippi
- St. Martin de Porres High School (Cleveland), a Catholic high school in Ohio

== See also ==
- Central Saint Martins
- St. Martin Parish School Board
- Saint Martin of Tours School (disambiguation)
- St Martin's College
