= Las Palmas, Veraguas =

Coordinates: 8.1333°N 81.4500°W

Las Palmas
- Corregimiento
- Location within Panama
- Country: Panama
- Province: Veraguas
- District: Las Palmas

Area
  - Land: 129 km^{2} (50 sq mi)

Population (2010)
  - Total: 3,106
  - Density: 24.1/km^{2} (62/sq mi)
- Population density calculated based on land area.
- Time zone: UTC−5 (EST)

Las Palmas is a corregimiento in Las Palmas District, Veraguas Province, Panama with a population of 3,106 as of 2010. It is the seat of Las Palmas District. Its population as of 1990 was 3,852; its population as of 2000 was 3,259.
