= Las Cruces, Veraguas =

Coordinates: 8.3000°N 81.2833°W

Las Cruces
- Corregimiento
- Location within Panama
- Country: Panama
- Province: Veraguas
- District: Cañazas
- Established: June 24, 2008

Area
  - Land: 64.4 km^{2} (24.9 sq mi)

Population (2010)
  - Total: 1,364
  - Density: 21.2/km^{2} (55/sq mi)
- Population density calculated based on land area.
- Time zone: UTC−5 (EST)

Las Cruces is a corregimiento in Cañazas District, Veraguas Province, Panama with a population of 1,364 as of 2010. It was created by Law 37 of June 24, 2008.
