= Atalaya, Veraguas =

Atalaya
- Corregimiento
- Location within Panama
- Country: Panama
- Province: Veraguas
- District: Atalaya

Area
  - Land: 47.6 km^{2} (18.4 sq mi)

Population (2010)
  - Total: 4,924
  - Density: 103.4/km^{2} (268/sq mi)
- Population density calculated based on land area.
- Time zone: UTC−5 (EST)

Atalaya is a corregimiento in Atalaya District, Veraguas Province, Panama with a population of 4,924 as of 2010. It is the seat of Atalaya District. Its population was 5,737 in 1990 and 4,449 in 2000.
