= Puerto Vidal =

Coordinates: 8.0500°N 81.6000°W

- Corregimiento
- Location within Panama
- Country: Panama
- Province: Veraguas
- District: Las Palmas

Area
  - Land: 132 km^{2} (51 sq mi)

Population (2010)
  - Total: 1,671
  - Density: 12.7/km^{2} (33/sq mi)
- Population density calculated based on land area.
- Time zone: UTC−5 (EST)

Puerto Vidal is a corregimiento in Las Palmas District, Veraguas Province, Panama with a population of 1,671 as of 2010. Its population as of 1990 was 1,671; its population as of 2000 was 1,665.
