= El Aromillo =

- Corregimiento
- Location within Panama
- Country: Panama
- Province: Veraguas
- District: Cañazas
- Established: August 5, 2002

Area
  - Land: 64.7 km^{2} (25.0 sq mi)

Population (2010)
  - Total: 1,359
  - Density: 21/km^{2} (54/sq mi)
- Population density calculated based on land area.
- Time zone: UTC−5 (EST)

El Aromillo is a corregimiento in Cañazas District, Veraguas Province, Panama with a population of 1,359 as of 2010. It was created by Law 43 of August 5, 2002.
