= Cerro de Plata =

Coordinates: 8.2833°N 81.3667°W

- Corregimiento
- Location within Panama
- Country: Panama
- Province: Veraguas
- District: Cañazas

Area
  - Land: 100.9 km^{2} (39.0 sq mi)

Population (2010)
  - Total: 1,594
  - Density: 15.8/km^{2} (41/sq mi)
- Population density calculated based on land area.
- Time zone: UTC−5 (EST)

Cerro de Plata is a corregimiento in Cañazas District, Veraguas Province, Panama with a population of 1,594 as of 2010. Its population as of 1990 was 3,563; its population as of 2000 was 1,595.
