= Cébaco (corregimiento) =

- Corregimiento
- Country: Panama
- Province: Veraguas
- District: Montijo
- Established: April 30, 2003

Area
  - Land: 79.7 km^{2} (30.8 sq mi)

Population (2010)
  - Total: 378
  - Density: 4.7/km^{2} (12/sq mi)
- Population density calculated based on land area.
- Time zone: UTC−5 (EST)

Cébaco is a corregimiento in Montijo District, Veraguas Province, Panama with a population of 378 as of 2010. It was created by Law 42 of April 30, 2003.
