= El María =

Coordinates: 8.2500°N 81.4333°W

- Corregimiento
- Location within Panama
- Country: Panama
- Province: Veraguas
- District: Las Palmas

Area
  - Land: 96.1 km^{2} (37.1 sq mi)

Population (2010)
  - Total: 1,077
  - Density: 11.2/km^{2} (29/sq mi)
- Population density calculated based on land area.
- Time zone: UTC−5 (EST)

El María is a corregimiento in Las Palmas District, Veraguas Province, Panama with a population of 1,077 as of 2010. Its population as of 1990 was 1,610; its population as of 2000 was 1,406.
