= El Potrero, Veraguas =

Coordinates: 8.3667°N 80.8167°W

El Potrero
- Corregimiento
- Location within Panama
- Country: Panama
- Province: Veraguas
- District: Calobre

Area
  - Land: 42.7 km^{2} (16.5 sq mi)

Population (2010)
  - Total: 635
  - Density: 14.9/km^{2} (39/sq mi)
- Population density calculated based on land area.
- Time zone: UTC−5 (EST)

El Potrero is a corregimiento in Calobre District, Veraguas Province, Panama with a population of 635 as of 2010. Its population as of 1990 was 687; its population as of 2000 was 650.
