= La Garceana =

Coordinates: 7.9403°N 81.0150°W

- Corregimiento
- Location within Panama
- Country: Panama
- Province: Veraguas
- District: Montijo

Area
  - Land: 25.6 km^{2} (9.9 sq mi)

Population (2010)
  - Total: 276
  - Density: 10.8/km^{2} (28/sq mi)
- Population density calculated based on land area.
- Time zone: UTC−5 (EST)

La Garceana is a corregimiento in Montijo District, Veraguas Province, Panama with a population of 276 as of 2010. Its population as of 1990 was 382; its population as of 2000 was 263.
