= Ponuga =

- Corregimiento
- Location within Panama
- Coordinates: 7.8833°N 80.9667°W
- Country: Panama
- Province: Veraguas
- District: Santiago

Area
  - Land: 289.7 km^{2} (111.9 sq mi)

Population (2010)
  - Total: 2,798
  - Density: 9.7/km^{2} (25/sq mi)
- Population density calculated based on land area.
- Time zone: UTC−5 (EST)

Ponuga is a corregimiento in Santiago District, Veraguas Province, Panama with a population of 2,799 as of 2010. Its population as of 1990 was 3,369; its population as of 2000 was 3,096.
