= La Laguna, Veraguas =

Coordinates: 8.3339°N 80.7361°W

La Laguna
- Corregimiento
- Location within Panama
- Country: Panama
- Province: Veraguas
- District: Calobre

Area
  - Land: 85.9 km^{2} (33.2 sq mi)

Population (2010)
  - Total: 774
  - Density: 9/km^{2} (23/sq mi)
- Population density calculated based on land area.
- Time zone: UTC−5 (EST)

La Laguna is a corregimiento in Calobre District, Veraguas Province, Panama with a population of 774 as of 2010. Its population as of 1990 was 1,033; its population as of 2000 was 881.
