= El Prado, Veraguas =

Coordinates: 8.2333°N 81.5000°W

El Prado
- Corregimiento
- Location within Panama
- Country: Panama
- Province: Veraguas
- District: Las Palmas

Area
  - Land: 41.2 km^{2} (15.9 sq mi)

Population (2010)
  - Total: 1,074
  - Density: 26.1/km^{2} (68/sq mi)
- Population density calculated based on land area.
- Time zone: UTC−5 (EST)

El Prado is a corregimiento in Las Palmas District, Veraguas Province, Panama with a population of 1,074 as of 2010. Its population as of 1990 was 4,971; its population as of 2000 was 1,103.
