= Urracá, Panama =

Urracá
- Corregimiento
- Location within Panama
- Coordinates: 8°06′05″N 80°50′17″W
- Country: Panama
- Province: Veraguas
- District: Santiago
- Established: November 22, 2002

Area
  - Land: 62.1 km^{2} (24.0 sq mi)

Population (2010)
  - Total: 1,399
  - Density: 22.5/km^{2} (58/sq mi)
- Population density calculated based on land area.
- Time zone: UTC−5 (EST)

Urracá is a corregimiento in Santiago District, Veraguas Province, Panama with a population of 1,399 as of 2010. It was created by Law 53 of November 22, 2002.
