= El Barrito =

Coordinates: 7.9500°N 80.9500°W

- Corregimiento
- Location within Panama
- Country: Panama
- Province: Veraguas
- District: Atalaya

Area
  - Land: 23.9 km^{2} (9.2 sq mi)

Population (2010)
  - Total: 899
  - Density: 37.6/km^{2} (97/sq mi)
- Population density calculated based on land area.
- Time zone: UTC−5 (EST)

El Barrito is a corregimiento in Atalaya District, Veraguas Province, Panama with a population of 899 as of 2010. The population was 856 in 2000 and 926 in 1990.
