= Cerro de Casa =

Coordinates: 8.1167°N 81.5500°W

- Corregimiento
- Location within Panama
- Country: Panama
- Province: Veraguas
- District: Las Palmas

Area
  - Land: 91.5 km^{2} (35.3 sq mi)

Population (2010)
  - Total: 2,343
  - Density: 25.6/km^{2} (66/sq mi)
- Population density calculated based on land area.
- Time zone: UTC−5 (EST)

Cerro de Casa is a corregimiento in Las Palmas District, Veraguas Province, Panama with a population of 2,343 as of 2010. Its population as of 1990 was 2,465; its population as of 2000 was 2,225.
