= Corozal, Veraguas =

Coordinates: 7.9033°N 81.4625°W

Corozal
- Corregimiento
- Location within Panama
- Country: Panama
- Province: Veraguas
- District: Las Palmas

Area
  - Land: 40.1 km^{2} (15.5 sq mi)

Population (2010)
  - Total: 920
  - Density: 22.9/km^{2} (59/sq mi)
- Population density calculated based on land area.
- Time zone: UTC−5 (EST)

Corozal is a corregimiento in Las Palmas District, Veraguas Province, Panama with a population of 920 as of 2010. Its population as of 1990 was 1,072; its population as of 2000 was 1,034.
