= Río de Jesús =

- Corregimiento
- Location within Panama
- Coordinates: 7°58′48″N 81°9′0″W
- Country: Panama
- Province: Veraguas
- District: Río de Jesús

Area
  - Land: 105.4 km^{2} (40.7 sq mi)

Population (2010)
  - Total: 2,484
  - Density: 23.6/km^{2} (61/sq mi)
- Population density calculated based on land area.
- Time zone: UTC−5 (EST)

Río de Jesús is a corregimiento in Río de Jesús District, Veraguas Province, Panama with a population of 2,484 in 2010. It is the seat of Río de Jesús District. Its population was 3,602 in 1990 and 2,585 in 2000.
