= Utira =

Coordinates: 7.9758°N 81.2167°W

- Corregimiento
- Location within Panama
- Country: Panama
- Province: Veraguas
- District: Río de Jesús

Area
  - Land: 48.2 km^{2} (18.6 sq mi)

Population (2010)
  - Total: 314
  - Density: 6.5/km^{2} (17/sq mi)
- Population density calculated based on land area.
- Time zone: UTC−5 (EST)

Utira is a corregimiento in Río de Jesús District, Veraguas Province, Panama with a population of 314 as of 2010. Its population as of 1990 was 393; its population as of 2000 was 318.
