= Las Huacas, Veraguas =

Coordinates: 7.9017°N 81.1406°W

Las Huacas
- Corregimiento
- Location within Panama
- Country: Panama
- Province: Veraguas
- District: Río de Jesús

Area
  - Land: 74.3 km^{2} (28.7 sq mi)

Population (2010)
  - Total: 965
  - Density: 13/km^{2} (34/sq mi)
- Population density calculated based on land area.
- Time zone: UTC−5 (EST)

Las Huacas is a corregimiento in Río de Jesús District, Veraguas Province, Panama with a population of 965 as of 2010. Its population as of 1990 was 1,044; its population as of 2000 was 942.
