= San Francisco, Veraguas =

San Francisco
- Corregimiento
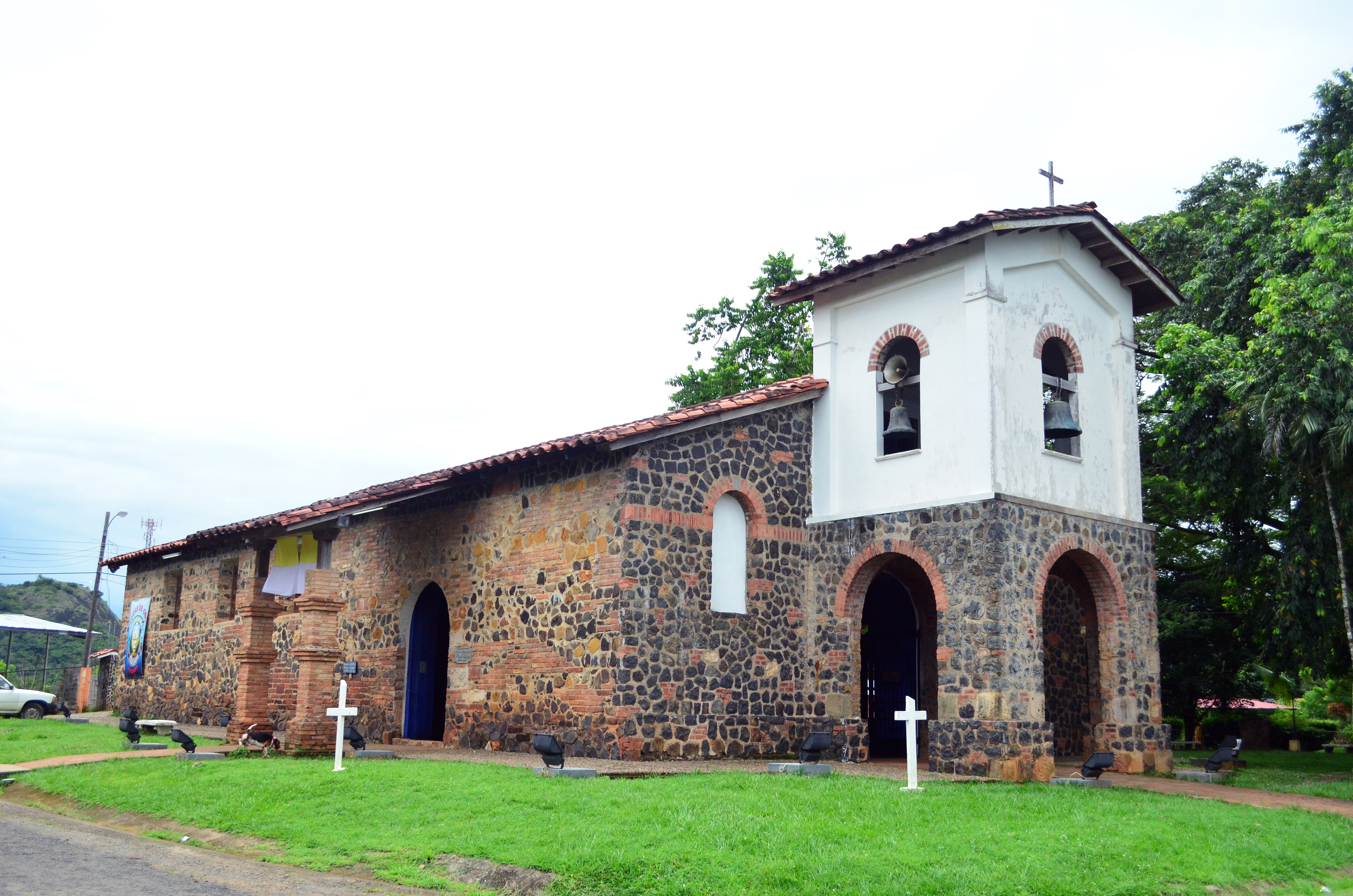
- Church of San Francisco de La Montaña

- Location within Panama
- Coordinates: 8.2500°N 80.9667°W
- Country: Panama
- Province: Veraguas
- District: San Francisco

Area
  - Land: 73.1 km^{2} (28.2 sq mi)

Population (2010)
  - Total: 2,283
  - Density: 31.2/km^{2} (81/sq mi)
- Population density calculated based on land area.
- Time zone: UTC−5 (EST)
- Climate: Am

San Francisco de la Montaña is a corregimiento in San Francisco District, Veraguas Province, Panama with a population of 2,283 as of 2010. It is the seat of San Francisco District. Its population as of 1990 was 1,851; its population as of 2000 was 2,221.

== Climate ==
Climate data for San Francisco
Month	Jan	Feb	Mar	Apr	May	Jun	Jul	Aug	Sep	Oct	Nov	Dec	Year
Record high °C (°F)	37.0 (98.6)	37.0 (98.6)	40.0 (104.0)	39.0 (102.2)	38.0 (100.4)	35.2 (95.4)	35.6 (96.1)	35.2 (95.4)	34.5 (94.1)	34.8 (94.6)	34.0 (93.2)	35.0 (95.0)	40.0 (104.0)
Daily mean °C (°F)	26.3 (79.3)	27.2 (81.0)	27.9 (82.2)	28.4 (83.1)	28.0 (82.4)	27.3 (81.1)	27.0 (80.6)	27.0 (80.6)	26.8 (80.2)	26.6 (79.9)	26.5 (79.7)	26.3 (79.3)	27.1 (80.8)
Record low °C (°F)	15.4 (59.7)	16.5 (61.7)	16.4 (61.5)	17.5 (63.5)	20.0 (68.0)	20.0 (68.0)	18.5 (65.3)	19.0 (66.2)	20.0 (68.0)	19.4 (66.9)	19.0 (66.2)	17.0 (62.6)	15.4 (59.7)
Average rainfall mm (inches)	26.3 (1.04)	6.5 (0.26)	26.7 (1.05)	75.7 (2.98)	294.6 (11.60)	312.2 (12.29)	258.6 (10.18)	321.6 (12.66)	372.3 (14.66)	426.0 (16.77)	270.9 (10.67)	71.8 (2.83)	2,463.2 (96.99)
Source: IMHPA
