= San Juan, Veraguas =

Coordinates: 8.3000°N 81.0167°W

San Juan
- Corregimiento
- Location within Panama
- Country: Panama
- Province: Veraguas
- District: San Francisco

Area
  - Land: 81.4 km^{2} (31.4 sq mi)

Population (2010)
  - Total: 1,591
  - Density: 19.5/km^{2} (51/sq mi)
- Population density calculated based on land area.
- Time zone: UTC−5 (EST)

San Juan is a Corregimiento in San Francisco District, Veraguas Province, Panama with a population of 1,591 as of 2010. Its population as of 1990 was 3,797; its population as of 2000 was 4,028.
