= Edwin Fábrega =

Coordinates: 8°03′07″N 81°01′02″W

- Corregimiento
- Location within Panama
- Country: Panama
- Province: Veraguas
- District: Santiago
- Established: November 22, 2002

Area
  - Land: 35.4 km^{2} (13.7 sq mi)

Population (2010)
  - Total: 3,434
  - Density: 97.1/km^{2} (251/sq mi)
- Population density calculated based on land area.
- Time zone: UTC−5 (EST)

Edwin Fábrega is a corregimiento in Santiago District, Veraguas Province, Panama with a population of 3,434 as of 2010. It was created by Law 53 of November 22, 2002.
