= SMPD =

SMPD may refer to:

- San Marino Police Department
- Santa Monica Police Department
- Sierra Madre Police Department
