= San Martín de Porres, Las Palmas =

San Martín de Porres
- Corregimiento
- Location within Panama
- Country: Panama
- Province: Veraguas
- District: Las Palmas
- Established: March 7, 1997

Area
  - Land: 26.3 km^{2} (10.2 sq mi)

Population (2010)
  - Total: 1,004
  - Density: 38.1/km^{2} (99/sq mi)
- Population density calculated based on land area.
- Time zone: UTC−5 (EST)

San Martín de Porres is a corregimiento in Las Palmas District, Veraguas Province, Panama with a population of 1,004 as of 2010. It was created by Law 10 of March 7, 1997; this measure was complemented by Law 5 of January 19, 1998 and Law 69 of October 28, 1998. Its population as of 2000 was 761.
