= Montijo District =

- District

- Location of the district capital in Panama
- Coordinates: 7°59′32″N 81°3′16″W
- Country: Panama
- Province: Veraguas Province
- Capital: Montijo

Area
  - Total: 300 sq mi (780 km^{2})

Population (2019)
  - Total: 7,060
  - Density: 23/sq mi (9.1/km^{2})
- official estimate
- Time zone: UTC-5 (ETZ)

Map of the Montijo District in Panama

Montijo District is a district (distrito) of Veraguas Province in Panama. The population according to the 2000 census was 12,211; the latest official estimate (for 2019) is 7,060. The district covers a total area of 780 square kilometres (301 sq mi). It includes all of the offshore islands of Coiba National Park, the largest of which are Coiba and Jicarón. The capital lies at the town of Montijo. The district includes the Gulf of Montijo and the islands in it.

== Administrative divisions ==
Montijo District is divided administratively into the following corregimientos:

- Montijo
- Isla Gobernadora
- La Garceana
- Leones
- Pilón
- Cébaco
- Costa Hermosa
- Unión del Norte
