= Atalaya District =

- District

- Location of the district capital in Panama
- Coordinates: 8°30′0″N 80°55′12″W
- Country: Panama
- Province: Veraguas Province
- Capital: Atalaya

Area
  - Total: 60 sq mi (156 km^{2})

Population (2019)
  - Total: 11,321
  - Density: 188/sq mi (72.6/km^{2})
- official estimate
- Time zone: UTC-5 (ETZ)

Atalaya District is a district (distrito) of Veraguas Province in Panama. The population according to the 2000 census was 8,916; the latest official estimate (for 2019) is 11,321. The district covers a total area of 156 km^{2}. The capital lies at the town of Atalaya.

== Administrative divisions ==
Atalaya District is divided administratively into the following corregimientos:

- Jesús Nazareno de Atalaya
- El Barrito
- La Montañuela
- San Antonio
- La Carrillo
