= Montijo, Panama =

Coordinates: 7.9922°N 81.0544°W

Montijo
- Corregimiento
- Location within Panama
- Country: Panama
- Province: Veraguas
- District: Montijo

Area
  - Land: 58.1 km^{2} (22.4 sq mi)

Population (2010)
  - Total: 2,288
  - Density: 39.4/km^{2} (102/sq mi)
- Population density calculated based on land area.
- Time zone: UTC−5 (EST)

Montijo is a corregimiento in Montijo District, Veraguas Province, Panama with a population of 2,288 as of 2010. It is the seat of Montijo District. Its population as of 1990 was 4,341; its population as of 2000 was 4,545.

== Climate ==
Climate data for Montijo
Month	Jan	Feb	Mar	Apr	May	Jun	Jul	Aug	Sep	Oct	Nov	Dec	Year
Record high °C (°F)	37.0 (98.6)	38.0 (100.4)	39.5 (103.1)	39.5 (103.1)	38.5 (101.3)	36.6 (97.9)	35.5 (95.9)	38.5 (101.3)	36.0 (96.8)	35.0 (95.0)	35.0 (95.0)	35.0 (95.0)	39.5 (103.1)
Daily mean °C (°F)	26.6 (79.9)	27.5 (81.5)	28.3 (82.9)	28.6 (83.5)	27.9 (82.2)	27.1 (80.8)	26.8 (80.2)	26.8 (80.2)	26.6 (79.9)	26.4 (79.5)	26.5 (79.7)	26.4 (79.5)	27.1 (80.8)
Record low °C (°F)	16.0 (60.8)	15.0 (59.0)	17.6 (63.7)	17.2 (63.0)	20.0 (68.0)	16.5 (61.7)	17.5 (63.5)	19.5 (67.1)	19.6 (67.3)	19.8 (67.6)	18.8 (65.8)	17.0 (62.6)	15.0 (59.0)
Average rainfall mm (inches)	22.7 (0.89)	11.0 (0.43)	28.4 (1.12)	110.2 (4.34)	294.6 (11.60)	287.0 (11.30)	266.6 (10.50)	318.1 (12.52)	338.8 (13.34)	404.9 (15.94)	272.2 (10.72)	85.9 (3.38)	2,440.4 (96.08)
Source: IMHPA
