= Catorce de Noviembre =

- Corregimiento
- Country: Panama
- Province: Veraguas
- District: Río de Jesús
- Established: July 29, 1998

Area
  - Land: 56.7 km^{2} (21.9 sq mi)

Population (2010)
  - Total: 787
  - Density: 13.9/km^{2} (36/sq mi)
- Population density calculated based on land area.
- Time zone: UTC−5 (EST)

Catorce de Noviembre is a corregimiento in Río de Jesús District, Veraguas Province, Panama with a population of 787 as of 2010. It was created by Law 58 of July 29, 1998, owing to the Declaration of Unconstitutionality of Law 1 of 1982. Its population as of 2000 was 829.
