= San José, Cañazas =

Coordinates: 8.3667°N 81.4000°W

San José
- Corregimiento
- Location within Panama
- Country: Panama
- Province: Veraguas
- District: Cañazas
- Established: March 7, 1997

Area
  - Land: 147.2 km^{2} (56.8 sq mi)

Population (2010)
  - Total: 1,936
  - Density: 13.1/km^{2} (34/sq mi)
- Population density calculated based on land area.
- Time zone: UTC−5 (EST)

San José is a corregimiento in Cañazas District, Veraguas Province, Panama with a population of 1,936 as of 2010. It was created by Law 10 of March 7, 1997; this measure was complemented by Law 5 of January 19, 1998 and Law 69 of October 28, 1998. Its population as of 2000 was 1,726.
