= La Yeguada =

Volcano in Panama

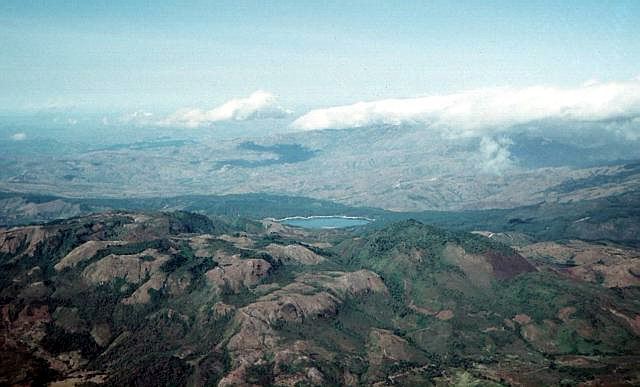
- La Yeguada (foreground) in 1994. Laguna La Yeguada is also visible.

Highest point
- Elevation: 1,297 m (4,255 ft)
- Coordinates: 8°28′12″N 80°49′12″W

Geography
- Location within Panama
- Location: Panama
- Parent range: Serranía de Tabasará

Geology
- Rock age(s): Miocene, Pliocene, Pleistocene
- Mountain type: Stratovolcano
- Volcanic arc: Central America Volcanic Arc
- Last eruption: Pleistocene

La Yeguada (also known as Chitra-Calobre) is a massive stratovolcano located in Veraguas Province, Panama, north of the Azuero Peninsula.

== Description ==
De Boer et al. were the first to show that La Yeguada volcano is active and part of the extension of the Central American volcanic arc in Panama. Further detailed work on the geochemistry of the lavas from La Yeguada and other volcanoes in Panama was completed by Defant et al. They substantiated, based on geochemistry, that the lavas were derived by subduction (calc-alkaline). Radiometric dates also showed that the volcanism falls into two groups that range from 20 million years to recent. They also showed that the youngest volcanism consists primarily of adakites (partial melts from the subducted slab) whereas the older volcanism is normal calc-alkaline lavas.

The region is also home to several sorts of trees, mainly, guayacanes which are now one of the most abundant trees in the region of Azuero, the valley is also an agricultural grassland since the Laguna La Yeguada works as a natural irrigation system which prevents the region's animals and plants from dehydration.

The woods in the valley is where most of the Panamanian cedro wood is produced.

== Climate ==
Climate data for Laguna La Yeguada (2001–2015 normals, extremes 1960–present)
Month	Jan	Feb	Mar	Apr	May	Jun	Jul	Aug	Sep	Oct	Nov	Dec	Year
Record high °C (°F)	34.2 (93.6)	34.8 (94.6)	36.6 (97.9)	36.5 (97.7)	35.6 (96.1)	32.8 (91.0)	32.8 (91.0)	33.8 (92.8)	32.8 (91.0)	31.4 (88.5)	37.0 (98.6)	33.6 (92.5)	37.0 (98.6)
Mean daily maximum °C (°F)	29.5 (85.1)	30.5 (86.9)	31.4 (88.5)	31.3 (88.3)	29.6 (85.3)	28.8 (83.8)	28.8 (83.8)	28.6 (83.5)	28.3 (82.9)	27.9 (82.2)	27.9 (82.2)	28.9 (84.0)	29.3 (84.7)
Daily mean °C (°F)	24.1 (75.4)	24.5 (76.1)	25.2 (77.4)	25.1 (77.2)	24.5 (76.1)	24.0 (75.2)	24.0 (75.2)	23.9 (75.0)	23.6 (74.5)	23.4 (74.1)	23.4 (74.1)	23.8 (74.8)	24.1 (75.4)
Mean daily minimum °C (°F)	18.7 (65.7)	18.5 (65.3)	18.9 (66.0)	19.0 (66.2)	19.4 (66.9)	19.3 (66.7)	19.2 (66.6)	19.1 (66.4)	19.0 (66.2)	19.0 (66.2)	18.8 (65.8)	18.7 (65.7)	19.0 (66.1)
Record low °C (°F)	10.0 (50.0)	11.1 (52.0)	10.0 (50.0)	11.1 (52.0)	11.1 (52.0)	12.2 (54.0)	12.2 (54.0)	13.0 (55.4)	12.2 (54.0)	12.2 (54.0)	12.2 (54.0)	11.1 (52.0)	10.0 (50.0)
Average rainfall mm (inches)	21.0 (0.83)	8.3 (0.33)	26.3 (1.04)	95.1 (3.74)	368.4 (14.50)	448.2 (17.65)	335.7 (13.22)	473.3 (18.63)	587.4 (23.13)	591.2 (23.28)	318.8 (12.55)	95.5 (3.76)	3,369.2 (132.66)
Source 1: INEC
Source 2: IMHPA (rainfall & extremes)

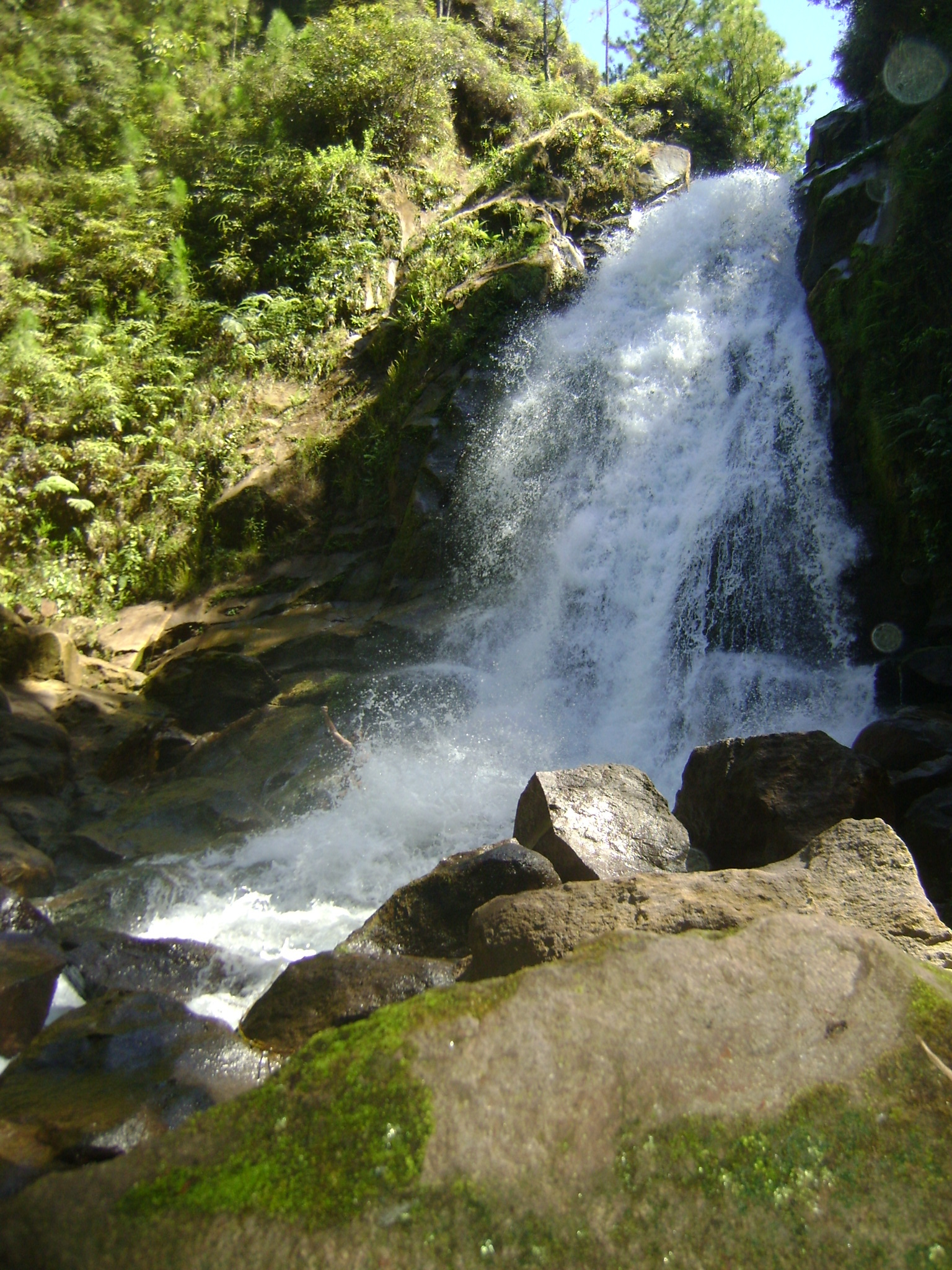
Waterfall in La Yeguada, Veraguas

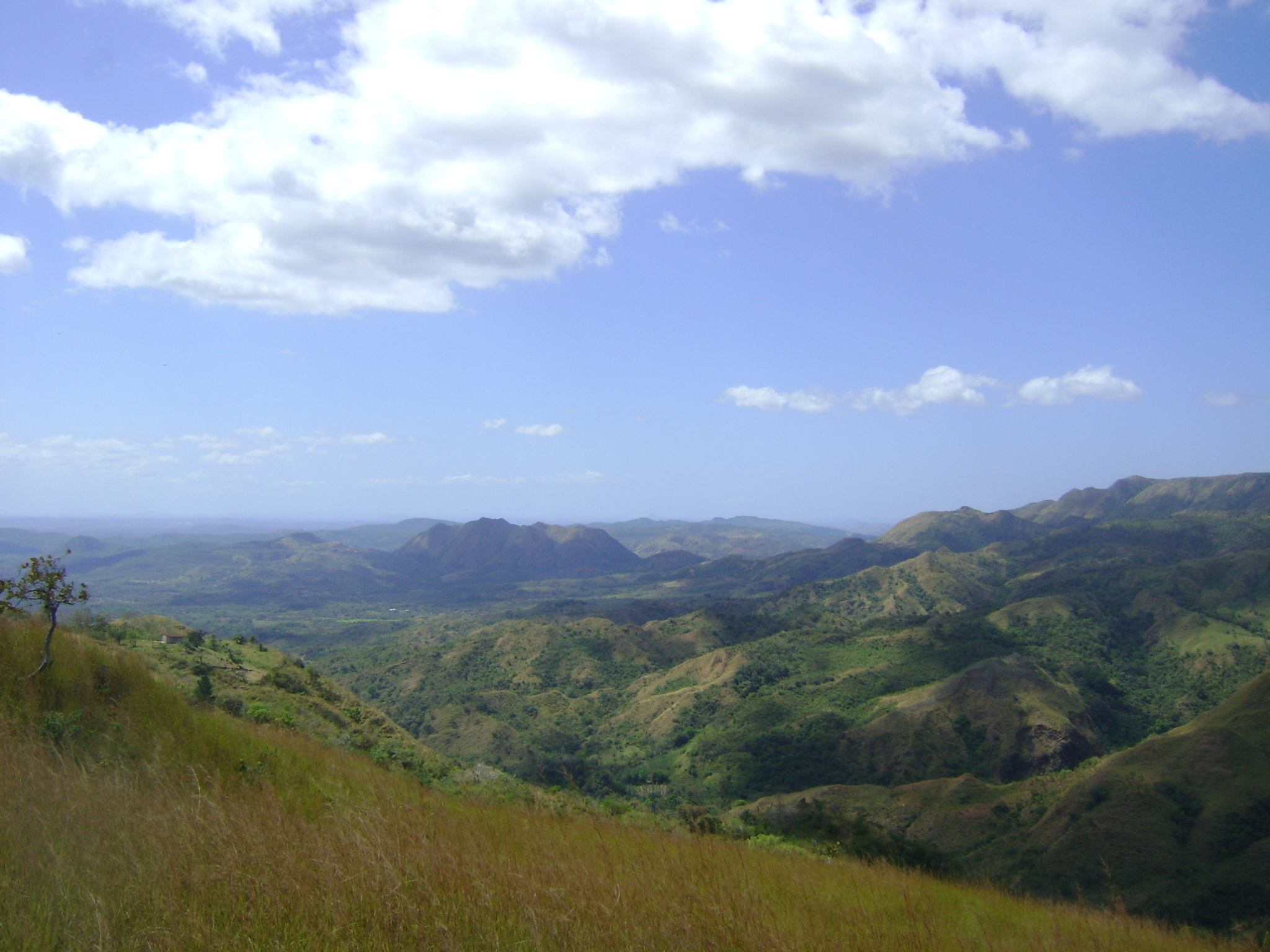
Llanura La Mochila in La Yeguada, Veraguas

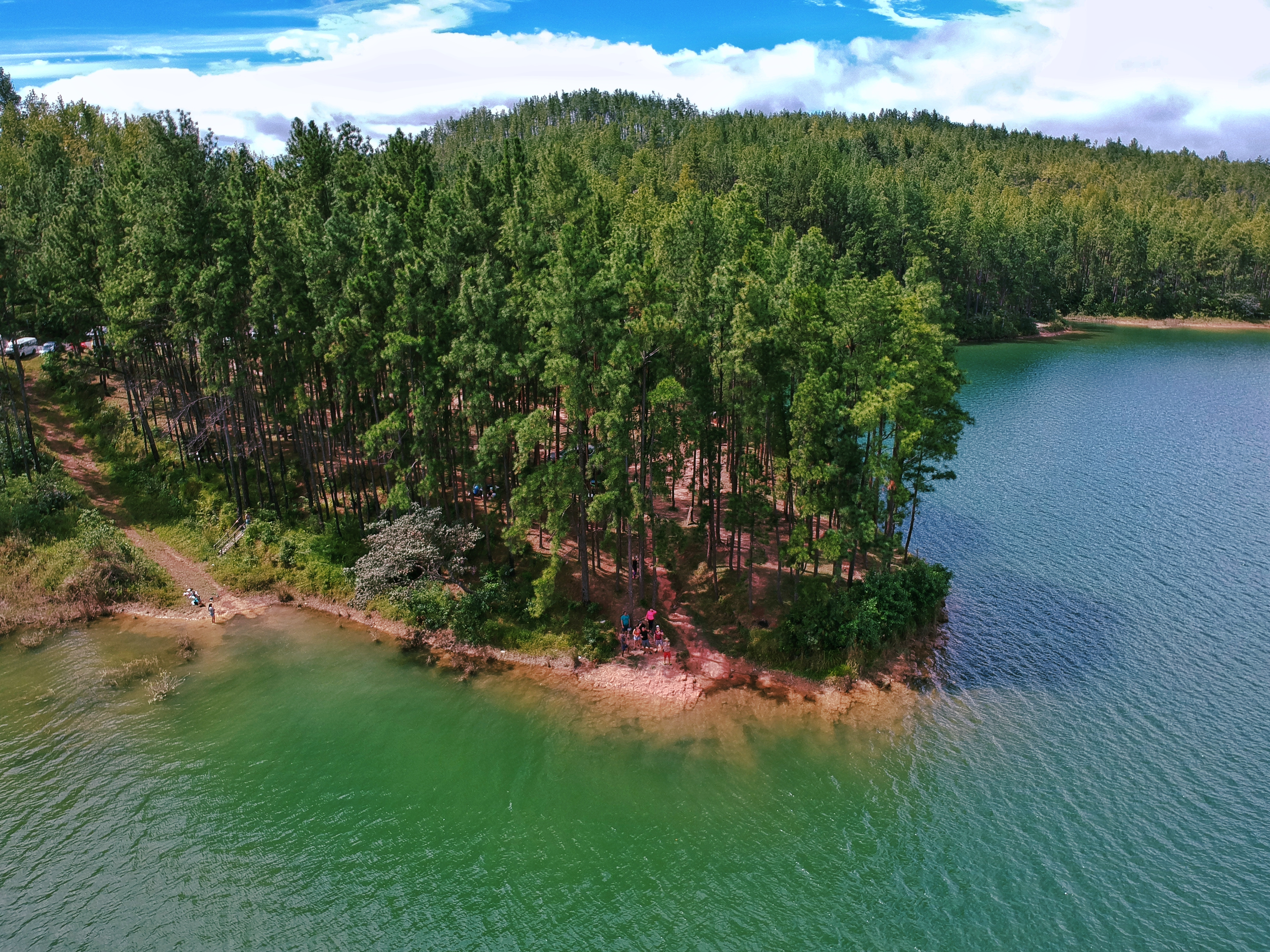
Fotografía Aérea de La Yeguada Panamá

== See also ==
- List of volcanoes in Panama
