= La Raya de Santa María =

- Corregimiento
- Location within Panama
- Coordinates: 8°10′12″N 80°49′12″W
- Country: Panama
- Province: Veraguas
- District: Santiago

Area
  - Land: 107.6 km^{2} (41.5 sq mi)

Population (2010)
  - Total: 3,268
  - Density: 30.4/km^{2} (79/sq mi)
- Population density calculated based on land area.
- Time zone: UTC−5 (EST)

La Raya de Santa María is a corregimiento in Santiago District, Veraguas Province, Panama with a population of 3,268 as of 2010. Its population as of 1990 was 3,401; its population as of 2000 was 3,517.
