= San José, Calobre =

Coordinates: 8.5167°N 80.9500°W

San José
- Corregimiento
- Location within Panama
- Country: Panama
- Province: Veraguas
- District: Calobre

Area
  - Land: 36.3 km^{2} (14.0 sq mi)

Population (2010)
  - Total: 680
  - Density: 18.7/km^{2} (48/sq mi)
- Population density calculated based on land area.
- Time zone: UTC−5 (EST)

San José is a corregimiento in Calobre District, Veraguas Province, Panama with a population of 680 as of 2010. Its population as of 1990 was 649; its population as of 2000 was 691.
