= San Martín de Porres, Santiago =

San Martín de Porres
- Corregimiento
- Location within Panama
- Coordinates: 8.2023447°N 81.5832503°W
- Country: Panama
- Province: Veraguas
- District: Santiago
- Established: November 22, 2002

Area
  - Land: 16.4 km^{2} (6.3 sq mi)

Population (2010)
  - Total: 16,406
  - Density: 1,001.5/km^{2} (2,594/sq mi)
- Population density calculated based on land area.
- Time zone: UTC−5 (EST)

San Martín de Porres is a corregimiento in Santiago District, Veraguas Province, Panama with a population of 16,406 as of 2010. It was created by Law 53 of November 22, 2002.
