= Saint Martin of Tours School =

Saint Martin of Tours School may refer to:

- St. Martin of Tours Catholic School, a Roman Catholic K-8 school in the Roman Catholic Archdiocese of Los Angeles
- A Roman Catholic K-8 school in Saint Martin of Tours Parish in San Jose, California
- A Roman Catholic K-8 school in the Roman Catholic Archdiocese of Philadelphia
