= San Antonio, Panama =

Coordinates: 8.0833°N 80.9333°W

San Antonio
- Corregimiento
- Location within Panama
- Country: Panama
- Province: Veraguas
- District: Atalaya
- Established: July 29, 1998

Area
  - Land: 17.9 km^{2} (6.9 sq mi)

Population (2010)
  - Total: 2,966
  - Density: 165.5/km^{2} (429/sq mi)
- Population density calculated based on land area.
- Time zone: UTC−5 (EST)

San Antonio is a corregimiento in Atalaya District, Veraguas Province, Panama with a population of 2,966 as of 2010. It was created by Law 58 of July 29, 1998, owing to the Declaration of Unconstitutionality of Law 1 of 1982. Its population as of 2000 was 2,125.
