= La Raya de Calobre =

Coordinates: 8.2167°N 80.8333°W

- Corregimiento
- Location within Panama
- Country: Panama
- Province: Veraguas
- District: Calobre

Area
  - Land: 33.6 km^{2} (13.0 sq mi)

Population (2010)
  - Total: 496
  - Density: 14.7/km^{2} (38/sq mi)
- Population density calculated based on land area.
- Time zone: UTC−5 (EST)

La Raya de Calobre is a corregimiento in Calobre District, Veraguas Province, Panama with a population of 496 as of 2010. Its population as of 1990 was 466; its population as of 2000 was 495.
