= List of electoral systems =

An electoral system (or voting system) is a set of rules that determine how elections and referendums are conducted and how their results are determined.

Some electoral systems elect a single winner (single candidate or option), while others elect multiple winners, such as members of parliament or boards of directors.

The study of formally defined electoral methods is called social choice theory or voting theory, and this study can take place within the field of political science, economics, or mathematics, and specifically within the subfields of game theory and mechanism design.

== List of electoral systems by types ==
=== Key ===
- Name (abbr.) and other names of the system (other names that may sometimes refer to other systems)
- Type of representation: the most common division of electoral systems
  - Winner-take-all system (also called majoritarian representation): includes all single-winner systems; no guaranteed minority representation
  - Proportional representation
  - Semi-proportional representation
  - Other: sortition, etc.
- Mixed system (yes/no): A systems composed of multiple other electoral systems, usually containing at least one proportional and one winner-take all system.
  - Superposition/parallel voting
  - Coexistence
  - Fusion
  - Correction
  - Conditional
  - Supermixed
- Single-winner/multiple winner system
- List / candidate (personal election, also called nominal election) based system
- Type of ballot
  - single choice (voter can cast only one vote, whether for a candidate or for a party)
  - multiple choice (voter can cast multiple votes)
  - cumulative(voter can cast more than one vote for a candidate)
  - ranked (preferential voting; ordinal voting) (allows vote transfers)
  - score (cardinal voting)
- Decision rule
  - No quotas
    - Plurality (candidate or candidates with most votes wins, even if not majority of votes)
  - Quota (candidates must at least reach the quota to be certain of election)
    - Notable quotas
      - Absolute majority (candidates must receive support at least half of voters
      - Hare quota
      - Droop quota
    - Largest remainder method (supplemental method to using quotas)
    - Multi-round voting (common supplemental method to using absolute majority
  - Pairwise comparisons
    - Simple majority rule
  - Other
    - Randomization
- Number of votes/voter
- Number of tiers: number of levels e.g. local, regional, state, national

=== Systems ===
Name(s)	Variations	Type of representation	Mixed?	Number of Winners	List-based OR candidate-based system	Decision Rule	Type of ballot	Number of votes / voter
First-past-the-post (FPTP/FPP) Single-member plurality (SMP/SMDP)	two-round system with lower than 50% requirement in first round	Winner-take-all	No	single-winner	candidate	plurality	single choice	1
General ticket Party-block voting (PBV)		Winner-take-all	No	multi-winner (one slate)	list	plurality	single choice	1
Plurality block voting (BV) plurality-at-large voting (multiple non-transferable vote, MTNV)	limited party block voting	Winner-take-all	No	multi-winner	candidate	plurality	multiple choice	varies (equal to number of winners)
Limited voting (LV) limited block voting partial block voting (multiple non-transferable vote, MNTV)	limited party block voting	semi-proportional	No	multi-winner	candidate	plurality	multiple choice	varies (less than number of winners)
Single non-transferable vote (SNTV)		semi-proportional	No	multi-winner	candidate	plurality	single choice	1
Single transferable vote (STV) Hare–Clark electoral system (proportional ranked-choice voting)		semi-proportional / proportional	No	multi-winner	candidate	quota	ranked choice (ordinal voting)	1 (effectively)
Instant-runoff voting (IRV) (Alternative vote - AV) (Ranked-choice voting - RCV) (Hare's method)	contingent vote, supplementary vote, Coombs' method	Winner-take-all	No	single-winner	candidate	majority	ranked choice (ordinal voting)	1 (effectively)
Two-round system (TRS) Runoff voting	Non-partisan primary, multi-round voting	Winner-take-all	No	single-winner	candidate	majority majoritarian	single choice	1 (each round)
Two-round block voting (majority block voting)(multiple non-transferable vote, MNTV)		Winner-take-all	No	multi-winner	candidate	majority	multiple choice	varies (equal to number of winners)(each round)
Multiple transferable vote (MTV) (Preferential block voting)		majoritarian	No	multi-winner	candidate	majority	ranked choice (ordinal voting)	=number of winners, effectively
Exhaustive ballot		majoritarian	No	single-winner /multi-winner	candidate	majority	single choice	1
Cumulative voting	panachage (certain types)	majoritarian / semi-proportional	No	single-winner /multi-winner	candidate	plurality	cumulative ballot	>1
Approval voting (AV)	block approval voting	majoritarian	No	single-winner /multi-winner	candidate	plurality	multiple choice	any number (max. one for one candidate)
Score voting Range voting	Approval voting (score voting 0–1)	majoritarian / semi-proportional	No	single-winner /multi-winner	candidate	plurality	score ballot(cardinal voting)	
Borda count		majoritarian / semi-proportional	No	single-winner /multi-winner	candidate	plurality	ranked choice (ordinal voting)	
Condorcet method	Copeland's method, Dodgson's method, Kemeny–Young method, Minimax, Nanson's method, ranked pairs, Schulze method, Tideman's alternative methods	majoritarian	No	single-winner	candidate	majority against every candidate	ranked choice (ordinal voting)	
Party-list proportional representation list-PR	Largest remainderHighest averagesBinomial voting Closed List Open List	semi-proportional / proportional	No	multi-winner	list (+ candidate, if open list)	quota or divisor method	single choice	1 (effectively)
Superposition - non-compensatory combination of FPTP + List-PR (Supplementary member system) (Parallel voting) (Mixed-member majoritarian representation - MMM)	Two-round system + List-PR mixed single vote version	semi-proportional	Yes	multi-winner(+ single-winner in districts)	candidate + list	mixed non-compensatory	single choice	2 (each tier)
Seat-linkage compensatory combination of FPTP + List-PR (Additional member system - AMS) (Mixed-member proportional representation - MMP)	mixed single vote versionbest-loser mixed-member proportional	semi-proportional / proportional	Yes	multi-winner(+ single-winner in districts)	candidate + list	mixed compensatory	single choice	2 (each tier)
Vote-linkage compensatory combination of FPTP + List-PR Positive vote transfer system (PVT) (mixed single vote - MSV) (Additional member system - AMS)	negative vote transfer	semi-proportional / proportional	Yes	multi-winner(+ single-winner in districts)	candidate + list	mixed compensatory	single choice	1
Dual member proportional (DMP)		semi-proportional / proportional	Yes	multi-winner (one elected by First-past-the-post voting; the other due to party list PR system	list or candidate	plurality (votes cast outside district have an effect)	single choice	1

== List of electoral systems used for national elections ==
Electoral system	Subtype / combination	Type of representation	Countries and territories that use it to elect primary (lower) chamber of legislature
First-past-the-post (FPTP/FPP); Single-member plurality (SMP/SMDP)	no	Winner-take-all (single-winner)	Antigua and Barbuda, Azerbaijan, Bahamas, Bangladesh, Barbados, Belarus, Belize, Bhutan, Botswana, Canada, Côte d'Ivoire, Dominica, Gambia, Ghana, Grenada, Jamaica, India, Kenya, Liberia, Madagascar, Malawi, Malaysia, Maldives, Micronesia, Myanmar, Nigeria, St. Kitts and Nevis, St. Lucia, Palau, Samoa, Solomon Islands, Trinidad and Tobago, Turkmenistan, Uganda, United Kingdom, St. Vincent and the Grenadines, Zambia
General ticket Party-list plurality block voting (PBV)	no	Winner-take-all	Singapore
Plurality block voting (BV) plurality-at-large voting	no	Winner-take-all	Laos, Lebanon, Mauritius, Oman, Syria, Tonga, Tuvalu, Vietnam
Limited voting (LV) limited block voting	no	Semi-proportional	
Single non-transferable vote (SNTV)	no	Semi-proportional	
Single transferable vote (STV)	no	Semi-proportional / Proportional	Ireland, Malta
Instant-runoff voting (IRV)	no	Semi-proportional	Australia, Papua New Guinea
Two-round system (TRS); Runoff voting	no	Winner-take-all (single-winner)	France
Two-round block voting majority block voting	no	Winner-take-all	
Borda count	no	Semi-proportional	Nauru
Modified cumulative voting	no	Semi-proportional	Norfolk Island
Party-list proportional representation (list-PR)	Closed list	Proportional	
Party-list proportional representation (list-PR)	Closed list, locally personalized	Proportional	Germany
Party-list proportional representation (list-PR)	Open list for some parties	Proportional	Colombia
Party-list proportional representation (list-PR)	Open list	Proportional	Albania, Algeria, Austria, Belgium, Brazil, Bulgaria, Chile, Croatia, Cyprus, Czech Republic, Denmark, Estonia, Fiji, Finland, Iceland, Indonesia, Jordan, Kosovo, Latvia, Netherlands, Norway, Peru, Poland, Sierra Leone, Slovakia, Slovenia, Sri Lanka, Suriname, Sweden
Party-list proportional representation (list-PR)	Panachage	Proportional	Ecuador, El Salvador, Honduras, Liechtenstein, Luxembourg, Switzerland
Superposition - non-compensatory combination of FPTP + List-PR Parallel voting, Supplementary member system	FPTP + List-PR (two votes)	Semi-proportional	Cameroon, D.R.Congo, Japan, Kazakhstan, Kyrgyzstan, Nepal, Philippines, (Note: The Philippines, South Korea and Thailand use the first-past-the-post voting system primarily; 80% or above of their members of parliament are elected by FPTP.) Russia, South Korea (de facto), (Note: South Korea uses the additional member system de jure, but it has been de facto nullified via decoy list usage by major political parties.) Taiwan, Venezuela, Thailand
Superposition - non-compensatory combination of FPTP + List-PR Parallel voting, Supplementary member system	FPTP + List-PR (tied votes)	Semi-proportional	Italy
Superposition - non-compensatory combination of FPTP + List-PR Parallel voting, Supplementary member system	FPTP + List-PR (proportional to FPTP)	Winner-take-all / Semi-proportional	Pakistan, Tanzania, Zimbabwe
Superposition - non-compensatory combination of FPTP + List-PR Parallel voting, Supplementary member system	TRS + List-PR	Semi-proportional	Egypt, Lithuania, Tajikistan
Superposition - non-compensatory combination of FPTP + List-PR Parallel voting, Supplementary member system	BV/PBV + List-PR	Semi-proportional	Andorra, Mauritania, Senegal, Monaco
Seat-linkage compensatory combination of FPTP + List-PR Additional member system - AMS Mixed-member proportional representation - MMP	FPTP + List-PR	Semi-proportional / Proportional	Bolivia, Lesotho, New Zealand
Seat-linkage compensatory combination of FPTP + List-PR Additional member system - AMS Mixed-member proportional representation - MMP	FPTP + List-PR (hybrid)	Semi-proportional	South Korea (de jure)
Seat-linkage compensatory combination of FPTP + List-PR Additional member system - AMS Mixed-member proportional representation - MMP	FPTP + List-PR (limited disproportionality)	Semi-proportional	Mexico
Vote-linkage (compensatory) combination of FPTP + List-PR	FPTP + List-PR	Semi-proportional	Hungary
Majority bonus system	List-PR with plurality bonus	Semi-proportional	Greece
Majority jackpot system	Majority jackpot	Winner-take-all / Semi-proportional	Djibouti
Majority jackpot system	Majority/minority jackpot	Semi-proportional	Armenia
Majority jackpot system	Two-round majority jackpot	Semi-proportional / Proportional	San Marino

== See also ==
- Comparison of electoral systems
- Sortition
- Indirect voting
- Liquid democracy
