= Veraguas Province =

Province of Panama

Coordinates: 8°N 81°W

Veraguas Province Provincia de Veraguas
- Province
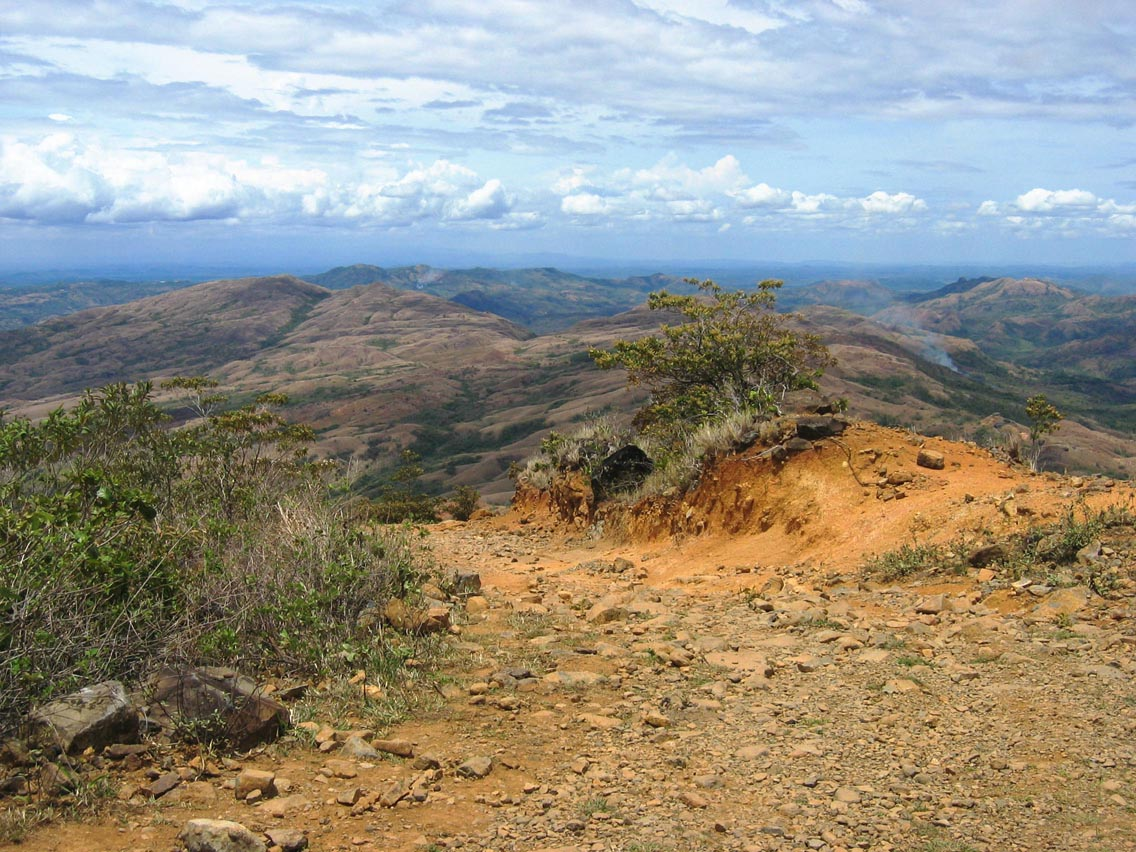
- Panorama of Veraguas Province

- Flag

- Location of Veraguas Province in Panama
- Country: Panama
- Founded: July 9, 1508
- Capital city: Santiago

Area
  - Total: 10,587.5 km^{2} (4,087.9 sq mi)

Population (2023 census)
  - Total: 259,791
  - Density: 24.5375/km^{2} (63.5519/sq mi)
- Demonym: veraguense

GDP (PPP, constant 2015 values)
  - Year: 2023
  - Total: $3.3 billion
  - Per capita: $14,300
- Time zone: UTC-5 (Eastern Time)
- ISO 3166 code: PA-9
- HDI (2017): 0.727 high
- Website: http://www.veraguas.org/

Veraguas (Spanish pronunciation: [beˈɾa.ɣwas]) is a province of Panama, located in the centre-west of the country. The capital is the city of Santiago de Veraguas. It is the only Panamanian province to border both the Atlantic and Pacific oceans. It covers an area of 10,587.6 km^{2} (4,087.9 sq mi) and in 2023 it had a population of 259,791.

== History ==
Veraguas was originally inhabited by the Veraguas culture.

Veraguas was explored by Christopher Columbus on his fourth voyage. He tried to establish the first colony in the new Spanish mainland but failed due to resistance from Indigenous peoples. Diego de Nicuesa also tried to establish a colony and failed, which made him create a colony to fight against the Indigenous population, which he named Nombre de Dios. Its capital, Santiago de Veraguas, was founded about 1636.

A province called Veraguas containing Santiago de Veraguas, but with changing boundaries over time, existed in Gran Colombia, the Republic of New Granada, and at times during the Panama State era.

It is said that its name comes from the indigenous word "Veracua" or "Viragua", though other theories abound. It is the only province in Panama with coastlines on both the Caribbean Sea and the Pacific Ocean. The majority of people live on the Pacific side; the Caribbean coast is mostly uninhabited.

== Tourism ==
Veraguas has many groups of inhabitants, mainly of Spanish/Indigenous origin named campesinos. This land offers tourists and visitors close contact with nature. Forests, mountains, coasts, and islands where there are more than 200 varieties of orchids; more than 400 species of birds, in addition to mammals, reptiles, and insects.

The various national parks in Veraguas include Coiba National Park (with the largest coral reef of the Pacific coast of America), Cerro Hoya National Park (covers the southwest part of the Azuero Peninsula and the sea that surrounds it), Santa Fe National Park (a forest in the northern region), La Yeguada Forest reserve (with a great artificial lake for generation of hydro electricity) and El Montuoso Forest reserve.

Beaches such as Playa Santa Catalina, Playa Mariato, Malena, and Torio offer great places for recreation, surfing, and fishing. Another famous touristic area is the Iglesia de San Francisco de la Montaña. This church has a Baroque architecture and dates back to 1727. It was declared a National Historical Monument on January 27, 1937.

== Administrative divisions ==
Veraguas Province is divided into 12 distritos (districts) and subdivided into 104 corregimientos.

Distrito	Area (km^{2})	Population Estimate 2010	Population Estimate 2019
Atalaya	156	10,749	11,321
Calobre	806	12,112	12,159
Cañazas	789	17,737	18,022
La Mesa	511	12,256	12,062
Las Palmas	1,015	18,516	18,493
Mariato	1,381	5,584	5,564
Montijo	780	6,928	7,060
Río de Jesús	302	5,376	5,501
San Francisco	437	10,412	10,536
Santa Fe	1,920	16,423	17,341
Santiago	971	93,841	99,821
Soná	1,519	29,329	29,774

District	Corregimientos (Subdivisions)	Cabecera (Seat)
Atalaya District	Jesús Nazareno de Atalaya, El Barrito, La Montañuela, San Antonio, La Carrillo	Jesús Nazareno de Atalaya
Calobre District	Calobre, Barnizal, Chitra, El Cocla, El Potrero, La Laguna, La Raya de Calobre, La Tetilla, La Yeguada, Las Guías, Monjarás, San José	Calobre
Cañazas District	San Francisco Javier de Cañazas, Cerro de Plata, Los Valles, San Marcelo, El Picador, San José, El Aromillo, Las Cruces	San Francisco Javier de Cañazas
La Mesa District	La Mesa, Bisvalles, Boró, Llano Grande, San Bartolo, Los Milagros, El Higo	La Mesa
Las Palmas District	Las Palmas, Cerro de Casa, Corozal, El María, El Prado, El Rincón, Lolá, Pixvae, Puerto Vidal, Zapotillo, San Martín de Porres, Viguí, Manuel Encarnación Amador Terreros	Las Palmas
Mariato District	Mariato, Arenas, El Cacao, Quebro, Tebario	Mariato
Montijo District	Montijo, Isla Gobernadora, La Garceana, Leones, Pilón, Cébaco, Costa Hermosa, Unión del Norte	Montijo
Río de Jesús District	La Ermita de Río de Jesús, Catorce de Noviembre, Las Huacas, Los Castillos, Utira, Nuevo San Juan	La Ermita de Río de Jesús
San Francisco District	San Francisco de la Montaña, Corral Falso, Los Hatillos, Remance, San Juan, San José	San Francisco de la Montaña
Santa Fe District	Santa Fe, Calovébora, El Alto, El Cuay, El Pantano, Gatuncito, Río Luis, Rubén Cantú	Santa Fe
Santiago District	Santiago Apóstol de Veraguas, La Colorada, La Peña, La Raya de Santa María, Ponuga, San Pedro del Espino, Canto del Llano, Los Algarrobos, Carlos Santana Ávila, Edwin Fábrega, San Martín de Porres, Urracá, La Soledad, Rincón Largo, El Llanito	Santiago Apóstol de Veraguas
Soná District	Soná, Bahía Honda, Calidonia, Cativé, El Marañón, Guarumal, La Soledad, Quebrada de Oro, Río Grande, Rodeo Viejo, Hicaco	Soná

== See also ==
- Veragua
- Veraguas Club Deportivo, a football team
- F.C. Veraguas 2010, a football team
