= 2026 Panama earthquake =

- USGS Shakemap

- UTC time: 2026-10-09 17:56:06
- ISC event: 646664234
- USGS-ANSS: ComCat
- Local date: 9 October 2026
- Local time: 12:56:06 EST (UTC−05:00)
- Duration: 40 seconds
- Magnitude: M_{w} 7.7
- Depth: 12.6 km (7.8 mi)
- Epicenter: 7.587°N 80.769°W
- Fault: Azuero-Sona Fault
- Type: Strike-slip
- Areas affected: Panama, northwestern Colombia
- Max. intensity: MMI IX (Violent)
- Aftershocks: 80+, largest M_{w} 6.6; 1,600+ (since 9 October)
- Casualties: 3 dead, 27 injured

On 9 October 2026, at 12:56:06 EST (17:56:06 UTC), a M_{w} 7.7 earthquake struck the Azuero Peninsula within Panama. The earthquake caused significant damage across several parts of the country, killed at least three people and injured at least 27 others. It is the largest quake to strike Panama since 1882.

== Tectonic setting ==
To the northwest of the border area between Panama and Costa Rica, oceanic crust of the Cocos plate is being subducted beneath the Caribbean plate along the Middle America Trench. To the southeast, the Nazca plate is being subducted. The boundary between the Cocos and Nazca plates is formed by the Panama fracture zone, which is a right lateral transform fault that intersects with the Middle America Trench to form a triple junction. The geometry of the subduction zone differs markedly either side of this triple junction. Central Panama lies on the small Panama plate, bounded to the south by the South Panama Deformation Belt, along which 20–25 mm per year of left-lateral strike-slip motion are estimated. A major splay off this belt is the Azuero-Sona fault, which crosses the Azuero Peninsula with a WNW-ESE trend and is also a left-lateral strike-slip structure.

== Earthquake ==
The earthquake occurred at 12:56:05 EST (17:56:05 UTC) in the Azuero-Sona Fault with its epicenter in the southern part of Herrera Province. The United States Geological Survey (USGS) reported a moment magnitude (M_{ww}) of 7.7 and a depth of 12.6 km (7.8 mi). The shaking caused by the earthquake had a maximum Modified Mercalli intensity of IX (Violent) in the Tonosí District, Los Santos Province. The earthquake was attributed to movement on the Azuero-Sona Fault by the Director of the Institute of Geosciences, University of Panama.

At 18:02 UTC, the U.S. National Weather Service issued a tsunami warning that included Colombia, Ecuador, and a significant part of the Central American Pacific coast.

In Panama City, buildings shook and hundreds of people evacuated into the streets. The earthquake was also felt in Costa Rica, and in several cities in Colombia.

The shallow tremor was felt by 4.5 million people, according to the National Civil Protection System.

== Aftershocks ==
Seismologists at the University of Panama recorded more than 80 aftershocks; most were too weak to be felt, though several measured more than M_{w} 5. The largest aftershock recorded in the sequence was a M_{w} 6.6 earthquake at 20:25 UTC with a maximum Modified Mercalli Intensity of VIII (Severe).

== Impact ==
Destroyed Panamanian firefighter building in Soná

A 68 year-old woman was seriously injured and later died of her injuries due to a collapsing wall in Macaracas. Another woman also eventually succumbed to injuries caused by a fall at a school in Santiago de Veraguas, while another person died in Panama City. A hotel and several homes collapsed in Tonosí. At least 27 people were injured, including 17 in Coclé, six in Los Santos, two in Panama Oeste and one each in Herrera and Veraguas provinces. A government building, a church and the Dos Continentes hotel partially collapsed whilst the Iguana Mall sustained minor damage.

According to the National Civil Protection Service (SINAPROC), 13,985 homes were damaged and another 3,390 were destroyed across Panama. At least 305 homes, eight healthcare facilities, 192 educational facilities, three churches, seven government buildings and 15 private structures were affected in Veraguas, alongside at least nine bridges and nine sections of road infrastructure, and the towns of Arenas, El Cacao, and Quebro were cut off after roads collapsed. In Coclé, 229 homes, six hotels, two hospitals, 32 educational facilities, 10 churches, 10 government buildings, 21 private structures and a pedestrian bridge in Penonomé were damaged. In Los Santos, 421 homes, three road sections, one bridge, five hotels, four hospitals, 35 educational facilities, two churches and 28 government buildings were damaged and 300 people from Isla de Cañas were evacuated to the mainland due to fears of a potential tsunami. In Herrera, 206 homes were damaged or destroyed, as well as three healthcare facilities, 91 educational facilities, five churches and six government buildings. Besides these, four road sections were affected and one community was isolated by a landslide. In Chiriquí, 75 homes were damaged or destroyed, of which 10 were total losses. Additionally, two healthcare facilities, 87 educational facilities (three total losses), 23 churches, 14 government buildings and a road section were affected, a water tank collapsed and a water treatment plant cracked. In Panamá, four residential buildings, 43 educational facilities and businesses were affected, while no residential damage was reported in the Pearl Islands. In Colón, seven single-family homes, 19 multifamily housing buildings, a hospital, 12 educational facilities, two government buildings, a municipal market, a road and a bridge were damaged. In Panama Oeste, 21 homes, three healthcare facilities, 18 educational facilities, three churches, one government building and three private infrastructures were damaged. In Bocas del Toro, eight homes were affected, alongside 25 reports of damage to educational facilities. In Darién, one home, 15 educational facilities and a medical facility sustained damage. In the indigenous regions of Ngäbe-Buglé and Guna Yala, 69 homes and 30 educational facilities were affected.

Power outages affected six provinces of Panama. Tocumen International Airport suspended operations following the earthquake in order to conduct an assessment and verify safety conditions.

In Colombia, several homes and 800 m (2,600 ft) of road were damaged in Antioquia Department.

== See also ==
- List of earthquakes in 2026
- List of earthquakes in Panama
