= Lucy Quintero =

- Birth name: Lucía Trejos Quintero
- Born: 4 March 1948; Parita, Herrera, Panama
- Died: 1 February 2023 (aged 74); Aguadulce, Coclé, Panama
- Genres: Folk
- Occupation: Folklore singer
- Years active: 1958–1998

Lucía Trejos Quintero (4 March 1948 – 1 February 2023), known professionally as Lucy Quintero, was a Panamanian folk singer known for having been the vocalist of Victorio Vergara's typical ensemble Plumas Negras.

== Biography ==
Quintero was born in Parita on 4 March 1948. Her passion for music began at a very young age, beginning her performances with the troubadour José Vergara. Then, in 1958, when she was barely ten years old, she joined Mochi González's ensemble in Mariato, Veraguas. She also sang alongside Victorio Vergara's brother, Justo. He went through many groups as a vocalist, among which stand out those headed by Ceferino Nieto and also the group led by his brother Chalino Nieto with whom in 1968, he recorded the successful singles "Maria José", "Josefa Matias", "La Tulivieja", "Quien me va querer" and "Era mas fea que yo". She also worked and recorded albums with Osvaldo Ayala and Teresín Jaén.

In January 1972, Quintero officially joined the ensemble Plumas Negras, and remained there until 1993, when she quit her musical career as a vocalist in the ensemble due to tonsil surgery, and in that period Gilda Cárdenas joined to replace Quintero, marking a before and after in typical popular Panamanian music before Vergara's death.

Quintero died on 1 February 2023, at the age of 74, due to complications from surgery that was performed after a heart attack that she suffered in December 2022.
