= Las Cabras =

Las Cabras may refer to:

- Las Cabras, Chile
- Las Cabras, Herrera, Panama
