= Parce (disambiguation) =

Parcé is a commune in the Ille-et-Vilaine department of Brittany in northwestern France.

Parce may also refer to:

- P.A.R.C.E., The fifth studio album by Colombian recording artist Juanes
- Parce (rum), A Colombian brand of rum
