= El Pedregoso =

El Pedregoso may refer to:

- El Pedregoso, Herrera
- El Pedregoso, Los Santos
