= Mariato District =

- District

- Location of the district capital in Panama
- Coordinates: 7°39′N 81°0′W
- Country: Panama
- Province: Veraguas Province
- Capital: Mariato
- Region: Azuero

Area
  - Total: 533 sq mi (1,381 km^{2})

Population (2019)
  - Total: 5,564
- official estimate
- Time zone: UTC-5 (ETZ)

Created in 2001, Mariato District is a district (distrito) in the southeastern corner of Veraguas Province in Panama. The district seat is the town of Llano del Catival, also known simply as Mariato.

Geographically, the district totaling 1,381 km^{2} (533 sq mi) comprises the west-facing coast of the Azuero Peninsula fronting the Gulf of Montijo. It shares the peninsula with Los Santos and Herrera Province, separated by a crest of low mountains, the Macizo de Azuero. The highest peak is Cerro Hoya (1,559 m (5,115 ft)) in the far south.

Punta Mariato at the southern tip of the district also holds the title as the southernmost point of North America.

Mariato is thinly populated with only 5,564 residents (2019 official estimate), dispersed over 149 settlements. The district seat, Llano del Catival, is the largest population center with 2,490 people (2010), accounting for 43% of the entire district.

== Administrative divisions ==
Mariato District is divided administratively into the following corregimientos:

- Mariato
- Tebario
- Quebro
- Arenas
- El Cacao
