= Chepo =

Chepo may refer to:

== Places ==
- Chepo, Panamá Province, town in Panama
- Chepo, Herrera Province, corregimiento in Panama
- Chepo River, Panamanian river

== People ==
- Chepo (footballer) (born 1972), Honduran footballer

== Other ==
- Chepo F.C., Panamanian football team
- Chepo expedition, expedition in Panama by Spanish pirates in 1679
