= El Cedro =

El Cedro may refer to:

- El Cedro, Herrera
- El Cedro, Los Santos
