= Bruno Mars videography =

Videos and media by American singer-songwriter

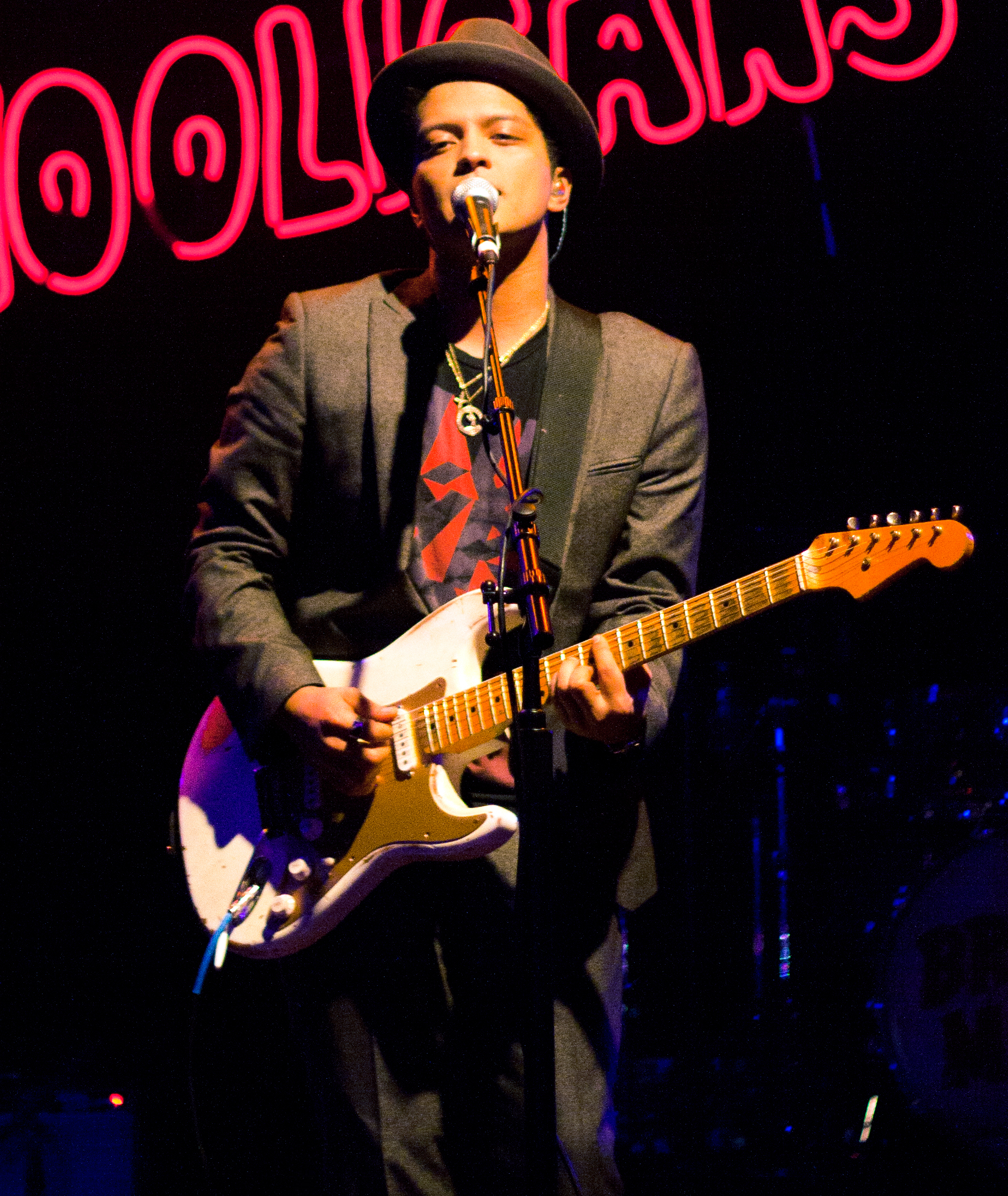
Bruno Mars performing in Houston, Texas, on November 24, 2010

American singer-songwriter Bruno Mars has released one concert video and appeared in various music videos, films, television shows, and commercials. After guest appearing in music videos, including "Long Distance" by Brandy and "Wavin' Flag (Coca-Cola Celebration Mix)" by K'naan, between 2008 and 2010. He featured on the chorus and videos for B.o.B.'s "Nothin' on You" and Travie McCoy's "Billionaire". A home video for "The Other Side" was issued, introducing Mars as a lead artist. From his debut album Doo-Wops & Hooligans (2010), he released music videos for "Just the Way You Are", "Grenade", "Liquor Store Blues", and "The Lazy Song". In 2011, he received awards for the "Just the Way You Are" music video, including MTV Video Music Award Japan for Best Male Video and Favorite International Video at the Myx Music Awards.

Mars followed with three other music videos in 2011, including "It Will Rain" from the soundtrack of The Twilight Saga: Breaking Dawn – Part 1, which won another Best Male Video award at the MTV Video Music Award Japan. In 2012, Mars's music video for "Locked Out of Heaven", from his second album Unorthodox Jukebox (2012), won Best Male Video at the 2013 MTV Video Music Awards. In 2013, videos for the singles "When I Was Your Man", "Treasure", which won Best Choreography at the latter event, and "Gorilla", which was controversial for its provocative dancing, were released. In 2015, the music video for Mark Ronson's single "Uptown Funk", which featured Mars, received several awards, including Video of the Year at the Soul Train Music Awards and Best Pop Video-UK at the UK Music Video Awards.

In 2016, Mars released his third album, 24K Magic, which spawned music videos for "24K Magic", "That's What I Like", "Versace on the Floor", and "Finesse" featuring Cardi B. The video for "That's What I Like" won several accolades in 2017, including an American Music Award for Video of the Year and Outstanding Music Video at the NAACP Image Awards. In the same year, the video for "24K Magic" received an award for Video of the Year at the BET Awards, as well as an accolade for Best Dance Performance and Video of the Year at the Soul Train Music Awards. The music video for "Finesse" was awarded Video of the Year at the 2018 Soul Train Music Awards and Best Music Video at the 2019 iHeartRadio Music Awards.

In 2021, Mars released a collaborative album with Anderson .Paak, as Silk Sonic, called An Evening with Silk Sonic, which generated videos for "Leave the Door Open", "Skate" and "Smokin out the Window". The former music video won Best R&B and Best Editing at the 2021 MTV Video Music Awards, as well as Video of the Year at the 2021 Soul Train Music Awards. "Smokin out the Window" won Video of the Year at the BET Awards 2022 and Video of the Year at the 2022 Soul Train Music Awards. In 2024, Mars and Daniel Ramos directed music videos for the former's collaborations "Die with a Smile" with Lady Gaga, "APT." with Rosie, and in 2025, "Fat Juicy & Wet" with Sexyy Red. In 2025, "Die with a Smile" won Favorite Music Video at the American Music Awards and "APT." won the MTV Video Music Award Japan for Best Collaboration.

Mars directed ten videos with Cameron Duddy, which earned them recognition at several award shows, including nominations for MTV Video Music Award for Best Direction on "Uptown Funk" and "24K Magic". The artist also directed six videos with Florent Dechard. Their work earned them an award for Video Director of the Year at the BET Awards 2021. Mars and Ben Winston's direction of Bruno Mars: 24K Magic Live at the Apollo (2017) earned them a nomination for a Primetime Emmy Award for Outstanding Music Direction. Mars has won five times Video of the Year at the Soul Train Music Awards. In addition to his music videos, Mars has starred in the movie Honeymoon in Vegas (1992) as Little Elvis and in Rio 2 (2014) as the voice of Roberto. Mars has additionally guest starred in television shows, including Sesame Street (2011) and Jane the Virgin (2016). He has also appeared in commercials for the clothing brand Bench, Vogue and Selvarey Rum.

== Music videos ==
Key
•	Denotes music videos directed or co-directed by Bruno Mars

Title	Year	Other performer(s) credited	Director(s)	Description	Ref.
"Love"	2010	Jaeson Ma	Michael Chang	The lyric video features multiple people looking for the true meaning of love, discovering that there are different kinds of love. None of the performers appear.	
"Nothin' on You"	2010	B.o.B.	Ethan Lader	The video features photo backdrops of cities like London and Tokyo. It was made using the stop motion technique on multiple collages of pictures of women. It features both B.o.B. and Bruno Mars performing; in one scene B.o.B. plays guitar, Mars plays the drums and Philip Lawrence plays the piano.	
"Billionaire"	2010	Travie McCoy	Mark Staubach	The video features Mars playing a guitar and singing the song with Travie McCoy. The latter is also seen in various scenarios helping out people in different ways. Pete Wentz makes a cameo appearance riding around with Mars and McCoy on Vespas.	
"The Other Side"	2010	CeeLo Green; B.o.B.	Nick Bilardello; Cameron Duddy	The home video follows Mars in a casual day in his life; showing him rehearsing, posing at photo shoots or wandering aimlessly around Los Angeles. His artistic abilities are highlighted throughout the video as he plays various instruments, trying to integrate his overnight success with his daily life.	
"Just the Way You Are"	2010	None	Ethan Lader	Mars walks in on his love interest listening to "Just the Way You Are" on her Walkman. He stops the player, removes the cassette, and pulls out the tape and arranges it into words, a drum, and a bell, which he rings with his fingers in sync with the song's chimes using a mixture of live action and stop motion. It is inspired by the artwork of Erika Iris Simmons.	
"Grenade"	2010	None	Nabil Elderkin	Filmed in Los Angeles, the video shows Mars dragging a piano across the city, as a way of showing affection to a girl who does not love him back. On the way to her house, he meets some unpleasant people, then finds his beloved with another man. Mars drags the piano away and ends up on a railroad track, hoping for the incoming train to end his misery.	
"Liquor Store Blues"	2011	Damian Marley	Jake Summer	The music video features Mars and Marley singing together in a psychedelic "acid trip" setting with a colorful background where smoke emerges in every direction.	
"The Lazy Song" •	2011	None	Cameron Duddy; Bruno Mars	The official video was filmed in one continuous and uninterrupted shot. Mars sings in a bedroom with five men wearing monkey masks; they perform dance moves typical of a boy band, goof around, and mimick the song's lyrics. The video ends with Mars pouring confetti and striking a pose for the camera.	
"The Lazy Song" (Alternate official video)	2011	None	Nez	This alternate official video features actor Leonard Nimoy in his daily routine living a lazy life. Nimoy walks around the neighborhood scaring the local kids, smokes weed and chills out.	
"Lighters"	2011	Bad Meets Evil	Rich Lee	Mars is seen by himself playing an upright piano while singing his verses. Meanwhile, Bad Meets Evil find their way from their own darkness to the light through a tunnel. They rise through a manhole which leads them to a field where Mars is singing. The video ends with the artists being joined by a large group of people, as they watch the rise of sky lanterns aglow.	
"Young, Wild & Free"	2011	Snoop Dogg; Wiz Khalifa	Dylan Brown	Snoop Dogg and Wiz Khalifa play two stoner students from the fictional N. Hale High School having fun with some Slip-N-Slides and girls. Footage from the movie Mac & Devin Go to High School (2012) is also featured. Mars does not appear in the video.	
"It Will Rain" •	2011	None	Phil Pinto; Bruno Mars	The music video starts with Mars spoiling and kissing a love interest. However, the relationship escalates to a fight that leads to a break-up and loneliness for both. The video is intercut with footage of the film Twilight: Breaking Dawn – Part 1 (2011), with clips showing the characters Bella and Edward.	
"Mirror"	2012	Lil Wayne	Antoine Fuqua	Throughout the music video, Wayne is shown splashing paint on a wall, while Mars is shown singing the chorus, standing in a ladder. By the end of the video, the wall Wayne was splashing turns out as a mural painting of himself crucified on a cross.	
"This Is My Love"	2012	Gold 1 Jaeson Ma	Claudio Zagarini; Michel Zeynali	The video consists of several shots of Gold 1, the only artist featured in the video, performing the song in different locations, along with shots of people holding up signs with different meanings for the word 'love' as well as cuts from Jaeson Ma's "Love" video.	
"Locked Out of Heaven" •	2012	None	Cameron Duddy; Bruno Mars	Mars is seen playing the song with his bandmates (The Hooligans) at an intimate venue to a small crowd having fun. These scenes are interwoven with others that feature The Hooligans smoking, drinking, and playing games along with Mars in a dressing room and an alley. The music video is interspersed with wonky TV effects.	
"When I Was Your Man" •	2013	None	Cameron Duddy; Bruno Mars	The video features Mars as a lonely balladeer sitting in front of a piano with his sunglasses on and a half-full glass of whiskey atop his instrument, reminding himself what he could have done to keep his lover. The video simulates a 1970s vibe with retro effects.	
"Treasure" •	2013	None	Cameron Duddy; Bruno Mars	The video features Mars and his band, The Hooligans, dancing together on a lit up stage and in matching red outfits. It is a recreation of their 2013 Billboard Music Awards performance, with simulated early 1980s special effects.	
"Bubble Butt"	2013	Major Lazer; 2 Chainz; Tyga; Mystic	Eric Wareheim	The music video features three women who have hoses injected into their butts by a flying giantess, who inflates the women's butts to a ridiculous size. Scenes of a psychedelic nightclub are shown where several women dance, flaunting suggestively their super-sized butts. None of the performers appear.	
"Gorilla" •	2013	None	Cameron Duddy; Bruno Mars	The video opens with a pair of women, in a strip club, "La Jungla", talking about 'Isabella', portrayed by Freida Pinto, as she has been "fooling around" with someone else's man (Mars). Throughout the video, Isabella pulls off sensual spins on the club's strip pole as Mars and his band perform the song. Isabella and Mars's affair is shown by physically intense scenes of the two in a car.	
"Uptown Funk" •	2014	Mark Ronson	Cameron Duddy; Bruno Mars	In the retro-styled music video, Mars and Ronson get their shoes shined, hair permed and jam along with their crew, side by side to a stretch limousine. It also features scenes of Mars and his crew dancing in the streets, with Ronson in the background.	
"24K Magic" •	2016	None	Cameron Duddy; Bruno Mars	The music video has Mars and his bandmates having fun, partying and drinking in Las Vegas. At the end of the video, Mars rides a jet ski in the Fountains of the Bellagio hotel.	
"24K Magic"	2016	Victoria's Secret Angels	None	The video has been described as the fusion of a "homemade music video and a Victoria's Secret ad". It features Victoria's Secret models Adriana Lima, Stella Maxwell and others lip-syncing to the song.	
"That's What I Like" •	2017	None	Jonathan Lia; Bruno Mars	The music video features Mars dancing alone with several animations, which move with him during his choreography, enacting the lyrics and music.	
"Versace on the Floor" •	2017	None	Cameron Duddy; Bruno Mars	In the video, Mars and Zendaya enter adjacent rooms in a hotel. Then, the former performs the song on a piano while the latter eavesdrops and sings to it. The video ends with Zendaya's dress hitting the floor, followed by her coming into his room.	
"Finesse" •	2018	Cardi B	Bruno Mars; Florent Dechard	The music video pays homage to the popular Fox sketch comedy television series In Living Color (1990–1994).	
"Wake Up in the Sky" •	2018	Gucci Mane, Kodak Black	Bruno Mars; Florent Dechard	Through the video, Gucci Mane, Kodak Black and Mars are seen with glittering outfits performing as Motown soul music singers.	
"Please Me" •	2019	Cardi B	Bruno Mars; Florent Dechard	In the video, Cardi B and Mars lock eyes at a taco restaurant late at night. The two, accompanied friends, make their way toward each other as various suggestive dances and scenarios are followed. Eventually, the pair move to a parking lot, getting into their respectively cars while sing to one another.	
"Blow" •	2019	Ed Sheeran, Chris Stapleton	Bruno Mars; Florent Dechard	In the music video, Sheeran, Stapleton and Mars are replaced by an all-female rock band. The band performed the song in The Viper Room, a nightclub in Los Angeles in front of a crowd of rock fans.	
"Leave the Door Open" •	2021	Anderson .Paak, Silk Sonic	Bruno Mars; Florent Dechard	The retro lounge music video features Mars and .Paak, as Silk Sonic performing the song in a vintage studio as several women dance to it.	
"Skate" •	2021	Anderson .Paak, Silk Sonic	Bruno Mars; Florent Dechard; Philippe Tayag (Note: Philippe Tayag is credited as co-director in the music video.)	In the music video, Mars and .Paak, as Silk Sonic singing and playing the drums as several women rollerskate around them.	
"Smokin out the Window" •	2021	Anderson .Paak, Silk Sonic	Bruno Mars; John Esparza	The retro music video takes place during the 1970s Soul Train era. It finds Mars and .Paak, as Silk Sonic, wearing lapel tuxedo jackets and performing a choreography on an old school TV set.	
"Die With a Smile" •	2024	Lady Gaga	Bruno Mars; Daniel Ramos	The music video is set in a '70s TV studio, with a band and an audience of faceless mannequins. It opens with Mars singing and playing the guitar. Then, the camera revels Gaga sitting at a piano with a cigarette in her mouth, before she sings. During their performance Gaga gets up from behind the piano to dance as lights flash. The video ends with a "heart shape forming around them".	
"APT." •	2024	Rosé	Bruno Mars; Daniel Ramos	The video features both Rosé and Mars presenting a garage band-esque performance, with the two singers alternating on drums and vocals, in matching black leather jackets across a pink set.	
"Fat Juicy & Wet" •	2025	Sexyy Red	Bruno Mars; Daniel Ramos	The theme of the video is the color red. Both Red and Mars are seen flirting, celebrating with champagne bottles and soap bubbles in various fictional cenarios. It features cameos from Mars's previous collaborators Gaga and Rosé.	
"Bonde do Brunão"	2025	None	Daniel Ramos	It includes visual elements of Brazilian culture as Mars eats "coxinha" and dances with a bottle of "cachaça" in his hand. These clips are intercut with footage taken during his tour in Brazil in 2024.	
"I Just Might" •	2026	None	Bruno Mars; Daniel Ramos	The music video features Mars dressed in a green suit as he leads a group of different versions of himself.	
"Risk it All" •	2026	None	Bruno Mars; Daniel Ramos	The visual depicts Mars leading a mariachi band, getting married, and settling into a happy and sunny life at home.	
"Still"	2026	Karol G	Pedro Artola; Daniel Ramos		
"Dance with Me"	2026	None	Daniel Ramos		

=== Guest appearances ===
Title	Year	Performer(s)	Director(s)	Description	Ref.
"Long Distance"	2008	Brandy	Chris Robinson	Mars is seen playing the piano in a sequence of the music video.	
"The Dedication (Ay DJ)"	2009	Jibbs; Lloyd	Erik White	Mars appears in the DJ booth dancing at the beginning of the video.	
"Wavin' Flag (Coca-Cola Celebration Mix)"	2010	K'naan	Nabil Elderkin	Mars is featured in the beginning of the video playing the bongo drum.	
"Feel Right" •	2015	Mark Ronson; Mystikal	Cameron Duddy; Bruno Mars	Mars is one of the judges of the talent show in the music video.	

== Concert film and live/video album ==
Title	Album details	Notes	Ref.
Bruno Mars: 24K Magic Live at the Apollo	Released: April 11, 2018; Label: Warner Music Japan; Formats: Blu-ray	The deluxe edition of 24K Magic includes the standard CD version, the remix of "Finesse" and, on a one-disc Blu-ray, the TV performance at the Apollo Theater, which aired on CBS.	

== Filmography ==
Title	Year	Role	Notes	Ref.
Honeymoon in Vegas	1992	Little Elvis	Cameo	
Rio 2	2014	Roberto	Voice role	

== Television ==
Title	Year	Role(s)	Channel	Notes	Ref.
Saturday Night Live	2010	Musical guest	NBC	Episode: "Jane Lynch/Bruno Mars"	
Sesame Street	2011	Himself	PBS	Episode: "Getting Centered"	
The Cleveland Show	2012	Himself (voice)	Fox	Episode: "Menace II Secret Society"	
Saturday Night Live	2012	Host/Musical guest	NBC	Episode: "Bruno Mars"	
Saturday Night Live	2014	Musical guest	NBC	Episode: "Cameron Diaz/Mark Ronson and Bruno Mars"	
Jane the Virgin	2016	Himself	The CW	Episode: "Chapter Forty-Four"	
Saturday Night Live	2016	Musical guest	NBC	Episode: "Emily Blunt/Bruno Mars"	
60 Minutes	2016	Himself	CBS	Episode: "Turkey, The Match of Their Lives, Bruno Mars"	

== Commercials ==
Company or product	Year	Description	Ref.
Bench	2011	Mars appears in two commercials for Bench as part of their clothing line "Bench On Mars" and "Bruno Mars Gets Khaki in Bench".	
Vogue	2011	Mars and model Joan Smalls photographed in 50's influenced suits in Puerto Rico as part of the clothing line "La Isla Bonita".	
Selvarey Rum	2021	Mars, Anderson .Paak and James Fauntleroy are featured on the SelvaRey Coconut Rum campaign.	
Don Quijote	2024	Mars, Miyu, Haruka, Miyuri and miku, and the store's mascot Donpen are featured on the Don Quijote campaign commercial.	
