= Leones =

Leones may refer to:

- Colegio Los Leones de Quilpué, basketball team from Chile
- Sierra Leonean Leone, currency of Sierra Leone
- Leones F.C. (Colombia), football team from Colombia currently named Itagüí Leones
- Leones F.C. (Ecuador), football team from Ecuador
- Leones F.C. (El Salvador), football team from El Salvador currently named Sonsonate
- Leones, Córdoba, a city in Marcos Juárez Department, Córdoba Province, Argentina
- Leones, Herrera, corregimiento in Panama
- Leones, Veraguas, corregimiento in Panama
- Aerfer Leone, undeveloped fighter aircraft
- Subaru Leone, subcompact car
- Carea Leonés, Spanish breed dog
- Leonese language, a language from the Iberian Peninsula
- Leonese people, the inhabitants of León whose homeland is the former Kingdom of León
