= Cerro Largo =

Cerro Largo may refer to:

- Cerro Largo, Rio Grande do Sul, Brazil
- Cerro Largo, Herrera, Panama
- Cerro Largo Department, Uruguay
- Cerro Largo F.C., Uruguay
