= El Barrero =

Coordinates: 7.9333°N 80.5167°W

- Corregimiento
- Location within Panama
- Country: Panama
- Province: Herrera
- District: Pesé

Area
  - Land: 36.8 km^{2} (14.2 sq mi)

Population (2010)
  - Total: 1,841
  - Density: 50/km^{2} (130/sq mi)
- Population density calculated based on land area.
- Time zone: UTC−5 (EST)

El Barrero is a corregimiento in Pesé District, Herrera Province, Panama with a population of 1,841 as of 2010. Its population as of 1990 was 1,535; its population as of 2000 was 1,774.
