= La Arena, Chitré District =

Coordinates: 7.9711°N 80.4642°W

La Arena
- Corregimiento
- Location within Panama
- Country: Panama
- Province: Herrera
- District: Chitré

Area
  - Land: 29 km^{2} (11 sq mi)

Population (2010)
  - Total: 7,586
  - Density: 261.8/km^{2} (678/sq mi)
- Population density calculated based on land area.
- Time zone: UTC−5 (EST)

La Arena is a corregimiento in Chitré District, Herrera Province, Panama with a population of 7,586 as of 2010. Its population as of 1990 was 4,993; its population as of 2000 was 6,429.
