= Los Canelos =

Coordinates: 8.1167°N 80.7000°W

- Corregimiento
- Location within Panama
- Country: Panama
- Province: Herrera
- District: Santa María
- Established: July 29, 1998

Area
  - Land: 48.8 km^{2} (18.8 sq mi)

Population (2010)
  - Total: 1,575
  - Density: 32.3/km^{2} (84/sq mi)
- Population density calculated based on land area.
- Time zone: UTC−5 (EST)

Los Canelos is a corregimiento in Santa María District, Herrera Province, Panama with a population of 1,575 as of 2010. It was created by Law 58 of July 29, 1998, owing to the Declaration of Unconstitutionality of Law 1 of 1982. Its population as of 2000 was 1,367.
