= El Toro, Herrera =

Coordinates: 7.7500°N 80.8667°W

El Toro
- Corregimiento
- Location within Panama
- Country: Panama
- Province: Herrera
- District: Las Minas

Area
  - Land: 82.8 km^{2} (32.0 sq mi)

Population (2010)
  - Total: 931
  - Density: 11.3/km^{2} (29/sq mi)
- Population density calculated based on land area.
- Time zone: UTC−5 (EST)
- Climate: Am

El Toro is a corregimiento in Las Minas District, Herrera Province, Panama with a population of 931 as of 2010. Its population as of 1990 was 1,073; its population as of 2000 was 797.
