= SelvaRey Rum =

American rum brand

- Company type: Private
- Industry: Distilled beverages, imports
- Founded: Los Angeles, CA (Origin: Pesé, Panama)
- Key people: Seth Gold, Marc Gold, Robert Herzig, Bruno Mars
- Products: Rum
- Website: www.selvarey.com

SelvaRey Rum is a premium U.S.-based rum brand, co-owned by Bruno Mars, whose aged, single estate White, Chocolate, Coconut, and Owner's Reserve Rums are distilled in Pesé, Panama, by Master Blender Francisco 'Don Pancho' Fernandez in antique copper column stills.

Pronounced Sel-Vuh-Ray, the brand name translates loosely from Spanish to 'King of the Jungle,' a nod to 'Don Pancho' Fernandez carving his distillery and sugarcane fields out of the Panamanian wilderness.

Mars created the brand's package and concept, Tropical Luxury Wherever You Are.

SelvaRey is currently distributed in the United States, Japan, and Greater China.

== Products ==
- SelvaRey White Rum - An 80-proof blend of rums aged for three and five years in American oak barrels before being carbon-filtered to remove color. SelvaRey White received a 94-point rating by The Tasting Panel and a Double Gold Medal from The Fifty Best. It was described as "unexpectedly smooth with a light vanilla sweetness".
- SelvaRey Chocolate Rum - A 70-proof, five-year-old rum flavored with locally sourced chocolate from Central America. SelvaRey Chocolate Rum received a 95-point rating by The Tasting Panel, won the Chairman's Trophy at the Ultimate Spirits Challenge, and received a Gold Medal from the Miami Rum Festival. It has "the rich flavor and scent" of chocolate.
- SelvaRey Coconut Rum - A 60-proof, two-year-old rum infused with a coconut essence. SelvaRey Coconut Rum received a 94-point rating from Cigar & Spirits and Double Gold and 94 points from Best Tasting Spirits.
- SelvaRey Owner's Reserve Rum - The legendary maestro ronero hand-selects the best rums, from fifteen to twenty-five-year old vintages, to create the ultimate blend from only the most prestigious casks. Bruno Mars personally designed the label, bottle, and gift box for this prestigious spirit, which sold out in less than two hours.

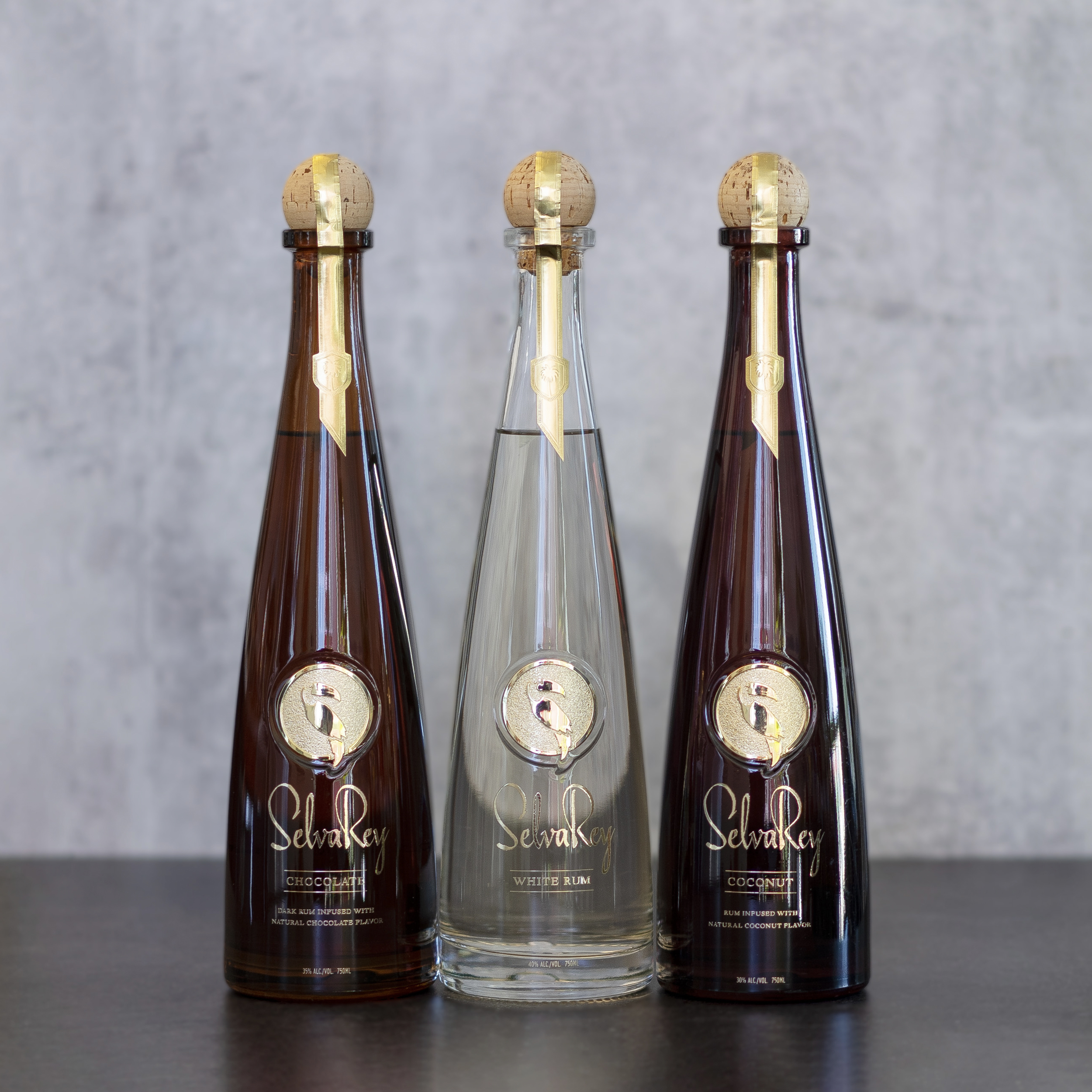
SelvaRey Chocolate, White, and Coconut Rums

== Awards ==
94 Points - The Tasting Panel - SelvaRey White Rum

Double Gold Medal - The Fifty Best - SelvaRey White Rum

95 Points - The Tasting Panel - SelvaRey Chocolate Rum

Chairman's Trophy, Ultimate Spirits Challenge - SelvaRey Chocolate Rum

RumXP Gold Award, Miami Rum Festival - SelvaRey Chocolate Rum

2021 L.A. Spirits Awards - Gold medal - SelvaRey Coconut Rum, SelvaRey Owner's Reserve Rum

94 Points - Cigar & Spirits - SelvaRey Coconut Rum

Double Gold, 94 Points - Best Tasting Spirits - SelvaRey Coconut Rum

A+++ - Good Spirits News - SelvaRey Owner's Reserve

== Popularity ==
SelvaRey Owner's Reserve sold out in less than two hours upon its initial release on ReserveBar.

SelvaRey Owner's Reserve made an appearance in the music video for Silk Sonic's Leave the Door Open.

R&B duo Bruno Mars and Anderson .Paak (aka Silk Sonic)–along with Grammy Award-winning singer-songwriter James Fauntleroy–launched the new SelvaRey Coconut Rum campaign in summer 2021 by releasing the jingle Tropical Luxury Wherever You Are on YouTube. Directed by Mars, the jingle's video has amassed four million views. The Hooligans, .Paak, D'Mile, Fauntleroy, and Moniz became co-owners.

Jay Chou, considered the 'King of Asian Pop,' was officially announced as a partner in SelvaRey in late 2020.

In 2023, Mars promoted the brand with the SelvaRey Rum Bar, a pop-up bar at the Fairmont Orchid in Hawaii, in which he mixed the guests' drinks himself and performed alongside a live salsa band. He stated that the bar was inspired by his experiences performing in Oahu as a child, in which everyone in the audience usually had "a beautiful cocktail in their hand."

== See also ==
- List of rum producers
