= Potuga =

Coordinates: 8.0667°N 80.6167°W

- Corregimiento
- Location within Panama
- Country: Panama
- Province: Herrera
- District: Parita

Area
  - Land: 49.2 km^{2} (19.0 sq mi)

Population (2010)
  - Total: 1,045
  - Density: 21.2/km^{2} (55/sq mi)
- Population density calculated based on land area.
- Time zone: UTC−5 (EST)

Potuga is a corregimiento in Parita District, Herrera Province, Panama with a population of 1,045 as of 2010. Its population as of 1990 was 1,101; its population as of 2000 was 1,039.
