= Pesé District =

- District

- Location of the district capital in Panama
- Coordinates: 7°54′0″N 80°36′36″W
- Country: Panama
- Province: Herrera Province
- Capital: Pesé

Area
  - Total: 110 sq mi (284 km^{2})

Population (2000)
  - Total: 12,471
- Time zone: UTC-5 (ETZ)

Pesé District is a district (distrito) of Herrera Province in Panama. The population according to the 2000 census was 12,471. The district covers a total area of 284 km^{2} (110 sq mi). The capital lies at the city of Pesé.

== Administrative divisions ==
Pesé District is divided administratively into the following corregimientos:

- Pesé (capital)
- Las Cabras
- El Pájaro
- El Barrero
- El Pedregoso
- El Ciruelo
- Sabanagrande
- Rincón Hondo
