= Pesé =

- Town and corregimiento
- Location within Panama
- Coordinates: 7°54′0″N 80°36′36″W
- Country: Panama
- Province: Herrera
- District: Pesé

Area
  - Land: 5.7 km^{2} (2.2 sq mi)

Population (2010)
  - Total: 2,565
  - Density: 447.4/km^{2} (1,159/sq mi)
- Population density calculated based on land area.
- Time zone: UTC−5 (EST)
- Climate: Aw

Pesé is a town and corregimiento in Pesé District, Herrera Province, Panama with a population of 2,565 as of 2010. It is the seat of Pesé District. Its population as of 1990 was 2,362; its population as of 2000 was 2,547.

== See also ==
- Parce Rum
- Seco Herrerano Rum
- SelvaRey Rum
