= El Ciruelo =

Coordinates: 7.8833°N 80.6667°W

- Corregimiento
- Location within Panama
- Country: Panama
- Province: Herrera
- District: Pesé

Area
  - Land: 45.7 km^{2} (17.6 sq mi)

Population (2010)
  - Total: 823
  - Density: 18/km^{2} (47/sq mi)
- Population density calculated based on land area.
- Time zone: UTC−5 (EST)

El Ciruelo is a corregimiento in Pesé District, Herrera Province, Panama with a population of 823 as of 2010. Its population as of 1990 was 879; its population as of 2000 was 839.
