= París, Herrera =

Coordinates: 8.0534°N 80.5533°W

París
- Corregimiento
- Location within Panama
- Country: Panama
- Province: Herrera
- District: Parita

Area
  - Land: 75.8 km^{2} (29.3 sq mi)

Population (2010)
  - Total: 1,070
  - Density: 14.1/km^{2} (37/sq mi)
- Population density calculated based on land area.
- Time zone: UTC−5 (EST)

París is a corregimiento in Parita District, Herrera Province, Panama with a population of 1,070 as of 2010. Its population as of 1990 was 1,024; its population as of 2000 was 1,131.
