= La Arena, Los Pozos District =

Coordinates: 7.7500°N 80.6000°W

La Arena
- Corregimiento
- Location within Panama
- Country: Panama
- Province: Herrera
- District: Los Pozos

Area
  - Land: 24.1 km^{2} (9.3 sq mi)

Population (2010)
  - Total: 559
  - Density: 23.2/km^{2} (60/sq mi)
- Population density calculated based on land area.
- Time zone: UTC−5 (EST)

La Arena is a corregimiento in Los Pozos District, Herrera Province, Panama with a population of 559 as of 2010. Its population as of 1990 was 509; its population as of 2000 was 533.
