= Las Llanas =

Coordinates: 7.6500°N 80.7000°W

- Corregimiento
- Location within Panama
- Country: Panama
- Province: Herrera
- District: Los Pozos
- Established: January 24, 2003

Area
  - Land: 61.5 km^{2} (23.7 sq mi)

Population (2010)
  - Total: 599
  - Density: 9.7/km^{2} (25/sq mi)
- Population density calculated based on land area.
- Time zone: UTC−5 (EST)

Las Llanas is a corregimiento in Los Pozos District, Herrera Province, Panama with a population of 599 as of 2010. It was created by Law 18 of January 24, 2003.
