= Quebrada El Ciprián =

Coordinates: 7.7000°N 80.7667°W

- Corregimiento
- Location within Panama
- Country: Panama
- Province: Herrera
- District: Las Minas
- Established: April 30, 2003

Area
  - Land: 43.1 km^{2} (16.6 sq mi)

Population (2010)
  - Total: 919
  - Density: 21.3/km^{2} (55/sq mi)
- Population density calculated based on land area.
- Time zone: UTC−5 (EST)

Quebrada El Ciprián is a corregimiento in Las Minas District, Herrera Province, Panama with a population of 919 as of 2010. It was created by Law 41 of April 30, 2003.
