= Los Llanos, Herrera =

Coordinates: 7.9333°N 80.8833°W

Los Llanos
- Corregimiento
- Location within Panama
- Country: Panama
- Province: Herrera
- District: Ocú

Area
  - Land: 98.7 km^{2} (38.1 sq mi)

Population (2010)
  - Total: 2,110
  - Density: 21.4/km^{2} (55/sq mi)
- Population density calculated based on land area.
- Time zone: UTC−5 (EST)

Los Llanos is a corregimiento in Ocú District, Herrera Province, Panama with a population of 2,110 as of 2010. Its population as of 1990 was 3,166; its population as of 2000 was 2,416.
