= Portobelillo =

Coordinates: 8.0180°N 80.5977°W

- Corregimiento
- Location within Panama
- Country: Panama
- Province: Herrera
- District: Parita

Area
  - Land: 27 km^{2} (10 sq mi)

Population (2010)
  - Total: 892
  - Density: 33.1/km^{2} (86/sq mi)
- Population density calculated based on land area.
- Time zone: UTC−5 (EST)

Portobelillo is a corregimiento in Parita District, Herrera Province, Panama with a population of 892 as of 2010. Its population as of 1990 was 890; its population as of 2000 was 906.
