= Las Minas, Herrera =

Las Minas
- Town and corregimiento
- Location within Panama
- Coordinates: 7°48′0″N 80°44′24″W
- Country: Panama
- Province: Herrera
- District: Las Minas

Area
  - Land: 57.1 km^{2} (22.0 sq mi)

Population (2010)
  - Total: 1,975
  - Density: 34.6/km^{2} (90/sq mi)
- Population density calculated based on land area.
- Time zone: UTC−5 (EST)
- Climate: Aw

Las Minas is a town and corregimiento in Las Minas District, Herrera Province, Panama with a population of 1,975 as of 2010. It is the seat of Las Minas District. Its population as of 1990 was 1,981; its population as of 2000 was 2,209.
