= El Tijera =

- Corregimiento
- Country: Panama
- Province: Herrera
- District: Ocú
- Established: July 29, 1998

Area
  - Land: 66.6 km^{2} (25.7 sq mi)

Population (2010)
  - Total: 588
  - Density: 8.8/km^{2} (23/sq mi)
- Population density calculated based on land area.
- Time zone: UTC−5 (EST)

El Tijera is a corregimiento in Ocú District, Herrera Province, Panama with a population of 588 as of 2010. It was created by Law 58 of July 29, 1998, owing to the Declaration of Unconstitutionality of Law 1 of 1982. Its population as of 2000 was 633.
