= El Calabacito =

Coordinates: 7.7167°N 80.6000°W

- Corregimiento
- Location within Panama
- Country: Panama
- Province: Herrera
- District: Los Pozos

Area
  - Land: 34 km^{2} (13 sq mi)

Population (2010)
  - Total: 617
  - Density: 18.1/km^{2} (47/sq mi)
- Population density calculated based on land area.
- Time zone: UTC−5 (EST)

El Calabacito is a corregimiento in Los Pozos District, Herrera Province, Panama with a population of 617 as of 2010. Its population as of 1990 was 703; its population as of 2000 was 692.
