= Chupampa =

Coordinates: 8.0833°N 80.7833°W

- Corregimiento
- Location within Panama
- Country: Panama
- Province: Herrera
- District: Santa María

Area
  - Land: 22.7 km^{2} (8.8 sq mi)

Population (2010)
  - Total: 1,231
  - Density: 54.3/km^{2} (141/sq mi)
- Population density calculated based on land area.
- Time zone: UTC−5 (EST)

Chupampa is a corregimiento in Santa María District, Herrera Province, Panama with a population of 1,231 as of 2010. Its population as of 1990 was 2,448; its population as of 2000 was 1,237.
