= Los Pozos, Herrera =

Los Pozos
- Town and corregimiento
- Location within Panama
- Coordinates: 7°48′N 80°38′W
- Country: Panama
- Province: Herrera
- District: Los Pozos

Area
  - Land: 59.2 km^{2} (22.9 sq mi)

Population (2010)
  - Total: 2,199
  - Density: 37.2/km^{2} (96/sq mi)
- Population density calculated based on land area.
- Time zone: UTC−5 (EST)

Los Pozos is a town and corregimiento in Los Pozos District, Herrera Province, Panama with a population of 2,199 as of 2010. It is the seat of Los Pozos District. Its population as of 1990 was 2,139; its population as of 2000 was 2,268.
