= Los Cerritos, Panama =

Coordinates: 7.8000°N 80.6167°W

Los Cerritos
- Corregimiento
- Location within Panama
- Country: Panama
- Province: Herrera
- District: Los Pozos

Area
  - Land: 31.7 km^{2} (12.2 sq mi)

Population (2010)
  - Total: 985
  - Density: 31.1/km^{2} (81/sq mi)
- Population density calculated based on land area.
- Time zone: UTC−5 (EST)

Los Cerritos is a corregimiento in Los Pozos District, Herrera Province, Panama with a population of 985 as of 2010. Its population as of 1990 was 937; its population as of 2000 was 1,010.
