= Santa María District, Panama =

Santa María District
- District

- Location of the district capital in Panama
- Coordinates: 8°7′N 80°40′W
- Country: Panama
- Province: Herrera Province
- Capital: Santa María

Area
  - Total: 61 sq mi (158 km^{2})

Population (2000)
  - Total: 6,992
- Time zone: UTC-5 (ETZ)

Santa María District is a district (distrito) of Herrera Province in Panama. The population according to the 2000 census was 6,992. The district covers a total area of 158 km^{2}. The capital lies at the city of Santa María.

== Administrative divisions ==
Santa María District is divided administratively into the following corregimientos:

- Santa María (capital)
- Chupampa
- El Rincón
- El Limón
- Los Canelos
