= El Capurí =

Coordinates: 7.7167°N 80.6500°W

- Corregimiento
- Location within Panama
- Country: Panama
- Province: Herrera
- District: Los Pozos

Area
  - Land: 18.3 km^{2} (7.1 sq mi)

Population (2010)
  - Total: 446
  - Density: 24.3/km^{2} (63/sq mi)
- Population density calculated based on land area.
- Time zone: UTC−5 (EST)

El Capurí is a corregimiento in Los Pozos District, Herrera Province, Panama with a population of 446 as of 2010. Its population as of 1990 was 458; its population as of 2000 was 450.
