= Menchaca =

Coordinates: 7.8667°N 80.7667°W

- Corregimiento
- Location within Panama
- Country: Panama
- Province: Herrera
- District: Ocú
- Established: April 30, 2003

Area
  - Land: 64.9 km^{2} (25.1 sq mi)

Population (2010)
  - Total: 1,517
  - Density: 23.4/km^{2} (61/sq mi)
- Population density calculated based on land area.
- Time zone: UTC−5 (EST)

Menchaca is a corregimiento in Ocú District, Herrera Province, Panama with a population of 1,517 as of 2010. It was created by Law 41 of April 30, 2003.

== See also ==
- Carlos Menchaca (born 1980), American politician
