= El Rincón, Herrera =

Coordinates: 8.1200°N 80.6200°W

El Rincón
- Corregimiento
- Location within Panama
- Country: Panama
- Province: Herrera
- District: Santa María

Area
  - Land: 40.4 km^{2} (15.6 sq mi)

Population (2010)
  - Total: 1,712
  - Density: 42.3/km^{2} (110/sq mi)
- Population density calculated based on land area.
- Time zone: UTC−5 (EST)

El Rincón is a corregimiento in Santa María District, Herrera Province, Panama with a population of 1,712 as of 2010.
