= Chepo, Herrera =

Coordinates: 7.7333°N 80.8167°W

Chepo
- Corregimiento
- Location within Panama
- Country: Panama
- Province: Herrera
- District: Las Minas

Area
  - Land: 142.7 km^{2} (55.1 sq mi)

Population (2010)
  - Total: 1,415
  - Density: 9.9/km^{2} (26/sq mi)
- Population density calculated based on land area.
- Time zone: UTC−5 (EST)

Chepo is a corregimiento in Las Minas District, Herrera Province, Panama with a population of 1,415 as of 2010. Its population as of 1990 was 1,457; its population as of 2000 was 1,452.
