= Seco Herrerano =

Alcoholic beverage

Seco Herrerano is a brand of aguardiente (sugarcane liquor) produced in Pesé, Panama.

== History ==
Seco Herrerano was created by the Varela family in 1908. Seco was a popular and affordable rum in Panama. It went through a brand revival during the 2000s, eventually becoming a little more high-end.

== Description ==
Seco is to rum what grappa is to wine, meaning Seco a high-proof version of rum. Seco Herrerano is produced with sugar cane from the Herrera Province. It is distilled three times. It is a clear liquor that is sold at 35 percent alcohol by volume (70 US proof).

Varela Hermanos produces more than a million cases of Seco every year and it is sold to more than 65 countries around the world.

It is traditionally used straight or in mixed drinks as a replacement for rum or vodka. Seco Herrerano can be mixed with almost anything, from tropical fruits to liquors. One drink made with seco is the "Chichita Panamá" made with grapefruit and pineapple juice. It can be drunk with milk (colloquially known as "seco con leche") or coconut milk.
