= Chumical =

Coordinates: 7.8500°N 80.7333°W

- Corregimiento
- Location within Panama
- Country: Panama
- Province: Herrera
- District: Las Minas

Area
  - Land: 25 km^{2} (9.7 sq mi)

Population (2010)
  - Total: 665
  - Density: 26.6/km^{2} (69/sq mi)
- Population density calculated based on land area.
- Time zone: UTC−5 (EST)

Chumical is a corregimiento in Las Minas District, Herrera Province, Panama with a population of 665 as of 2010. Its population as of 1990 was 645; its population as of 2000 was 699.
