= Ocú District =

- District

- Location of the district capital in Panama
- Coordinates: 7°56′24″N 80°46′48″W
- Country: Panama
- Province: Herrera Province
- Capital: Ocú

Area
  - Total: 241 sq mi (625 km^{2})

Population (2000)
  - Total: 15,936
- Time zone: UTC-5 (ETZ)

Ocú District is a district (distrito) of Herrera Province in Panama. The population according to the 2000 census was 15,936. The district covers a total area of 625 km^{2} (241 sq mi). The capital lies at the city of Ocú.

== Administrative divisions ==
Ocú District is divided administratively into the following corregimientos:

- San Sebastián de Ocú (capital)
- Cerro Largo
- Los Llanos
- Llano Grande
- Peñas Chatas
- El Tijera
- Menchaca
- Entradero del Castillo
