= San Juan Bautista, Herrera =

San Juan Bautista
- Corregimiento
- Location within Panama
- Country: Panama
- Province: Herrera
- District: Chitré
- Established: July 29, 1998

Area
  - Land: 8.3 km^{2} (3.2 sq mi)

Population (2010)
  - Total: 11,823
  - Density: 1,422.5/km^{2} (3,684/sq mi)
- Population density calculated based on land area.
- Time zone: UTC−5 (EST)

San Juan Bautista is a corregimiento in Chitré District, Herrera Province, Panama with a population of 11,823 as of 2010. It was created by Law 58 of July 29, 1998, owing to the Declaration of Unconstitutionality of Law 1 of 1982. Its population as of 2000 was 10,645.
