= El Pájaro =

Coordinates: 7.9500°N 80.5833°W

- Corregimiento
- Location within Panama
- Country: Panama
- Province: Herrera
- District: Pesé

Area
  - Land: 23 km^{2} (8.9 sq mi)

Population (2010)
  - Total: 861
  - Density: 37.5/km^{2} (97/sq mi)
- Population density calculated based on land area.
- Time zone: UTC−5 (EST)

El Pájaro is a corregimiento in Pesé District, Herrera Province, Panama with a population of 861 as of 2010. Its population as of 1990 was 1,065; its population as of 2000 was 984.
