= Santa María, Herrera =

Coordinates: 8.1167°N 80.6667°W

Santa María
- Corregimiento
- Location within Panama
- Country: Panama
- Province: Herrera
- District: Santa María

Area
  - Land: 23.9 km^{2} (9.2 sq mi)

Population (2010)
  - Total: 1,682
  - Density: 70.4/km^{2} (182/sq mi)
- Population density calculated based on land area.
- Time zone: UTC−5 (EST)

Santa María is a corregimiento in Santa María District, Herrera Province, Panama with a population of 1,682 as of 2010. It is the seat of Santa María District. Its population as of 1990 was 2,591; its population as of 2000 was 1,641.
