= Los Cerros de Paja =

Coordinates: 7.7167°N 80.6667°W

- Corregimiento
- Location within Panama
- Country: Panama
- Province: Herrera
- District: Los Pozos

Area
  - Land: 37.4 km^{2} (14.4 sq mi)

Population (2010)
  - Total: 896
  - Density: 23.9/km^{2} (62/sq mi)
- Population density calculated based on land area.
- Time zone: UTC−5 (EST)

Los Cerros de Paja is a corregimiento in Los Pozos District, Herrera Province, Panama with a population of 896 as of 2010. Its population as of 1990 was 1,075; its population as of 2000 was 877.
