= Monagrillo (corregimiento) =

Corregimiento in Herrera, Panama

Coordinates: 7.9934°N 80.4444°W

- Corregimiento
- Location within Panama
- Country: Panama
- Province: Herrera
- District: Chitré

Area
  - Land: 27.2 km^{2} (10.5 sq mi)

Population (2010)
  - Total: 12,385
  - Density: 455.3/km^{2} (1,179/sq mi)
- Time zone: UTC−5 (EST)

Monagrillo is a corregimiento in Chitré District, Herrera Province, Panama with a population of 12,385 as of 2010. Its population as of 1990 was 8,028; its population as of 2000 was 9,549.
