= Rincón Hondo =

Coordinates: 7.8333°N 80.6000°W

- Corregimiento
- Location within Panama
- Country: Panama
- Province: Herrera
- District: Pesé

Area
  - Land: 29 km^{2} (11 sq mi)

Population (2010)
  - Total: 1,416
  - Density: 48.9/km^{2} (127/sq mi)
- Population density calculated based on land area.
- Time zone: UTC−5 (EST)

Rincón Hondo is a corregimiento in Pesé District, Herrera Province, Panama with a population of 1,416 as of 2010. Its population as of 1990 was 1,383; its population as of 2000 was 1,484.

Rincón Hondo is a tight-knit community with one central church and school. in June 2017, a group of American high school students came to the village to help with the construction of a new sport court for the community. The court was completed in July 2017 and offers public basketball hoops and soccer goals for the people of Rincón Hondo. Plans have been made by local officials to construct a roof over the new court for protection from rain.

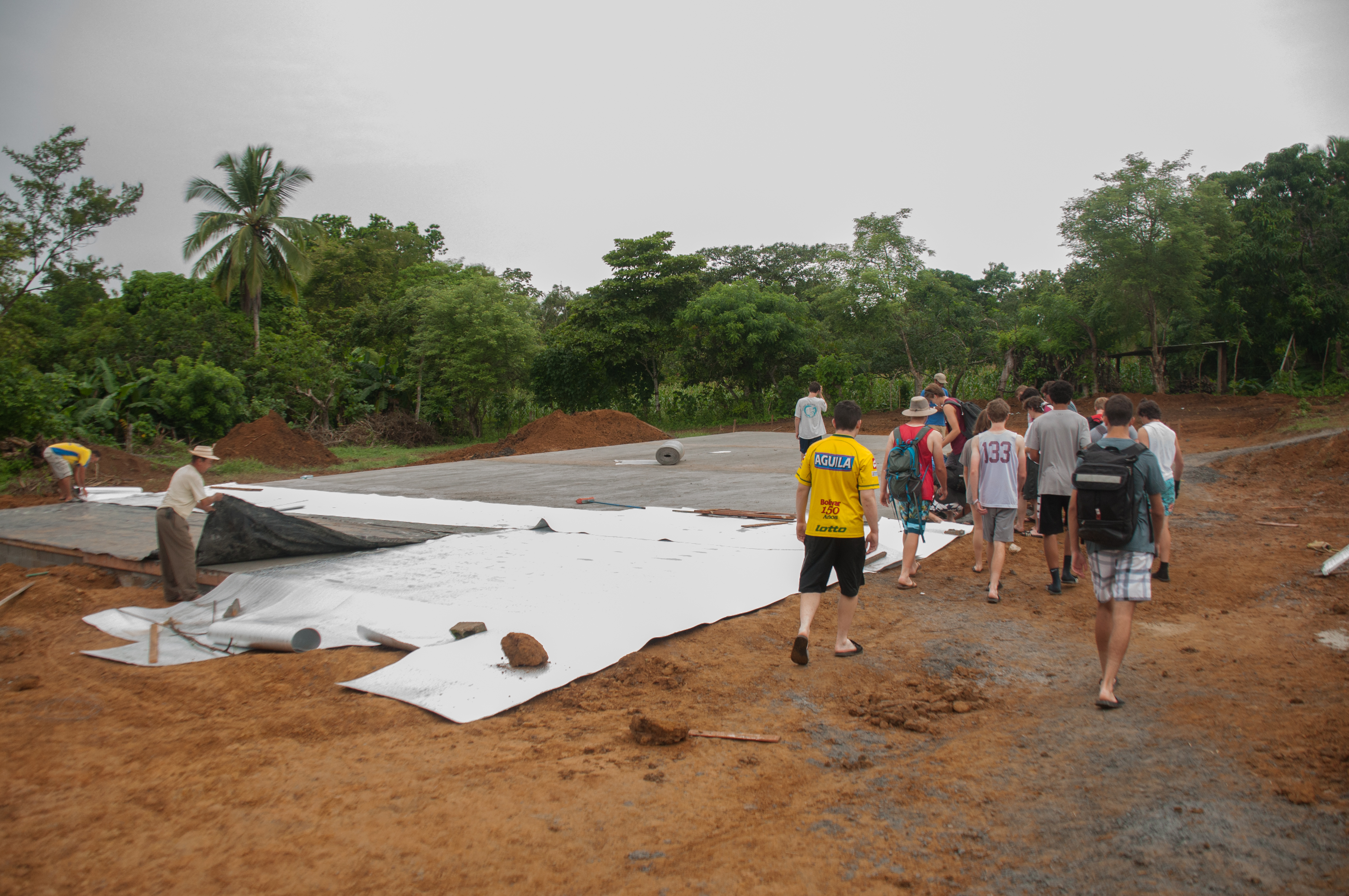
Construction of new sport court

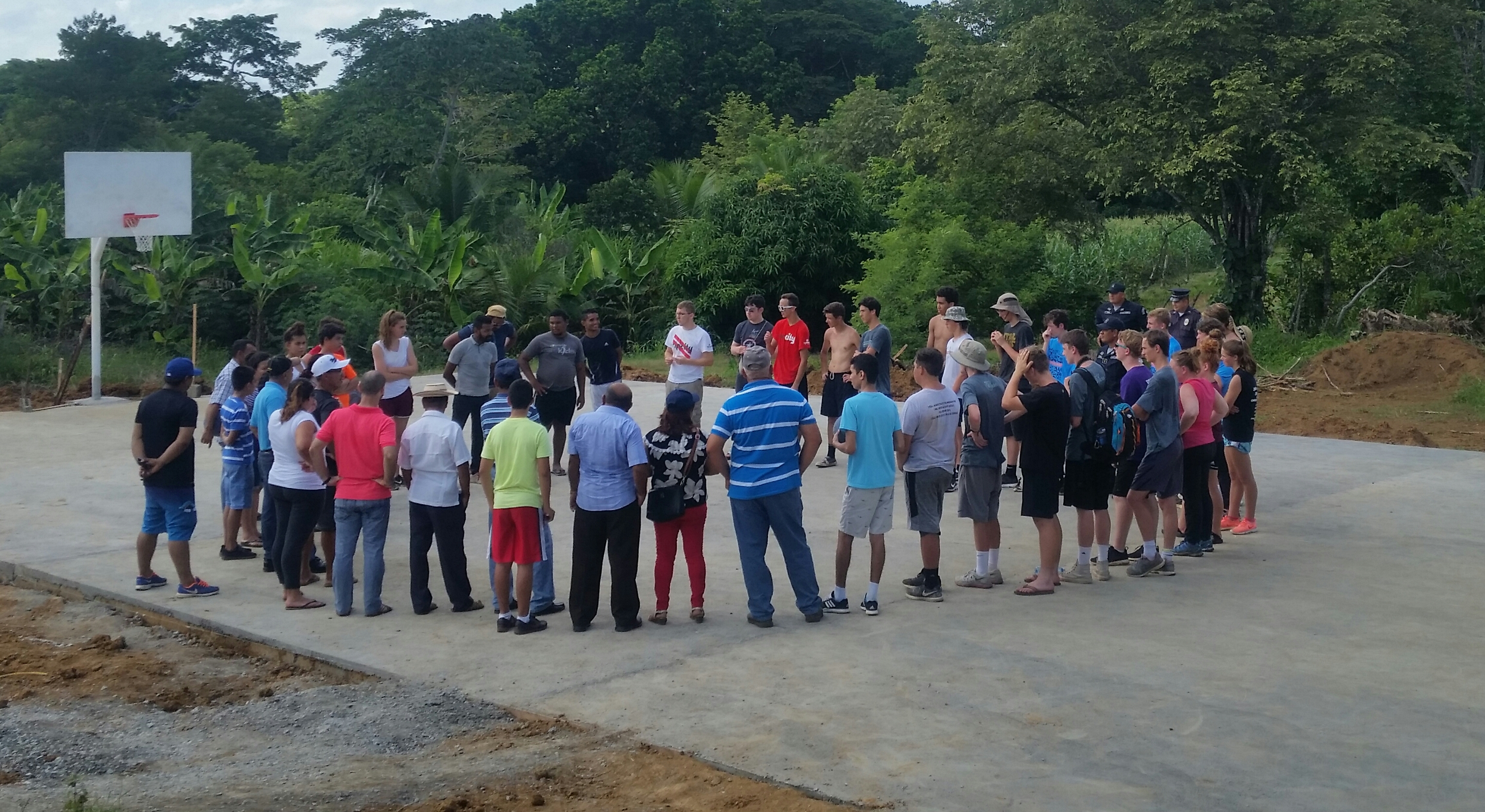
Inaugural ceremony on finished court
