= Llano de la Cruz =

Coordinates: 7.9667°N 80.6500°W

- Corregimiento
- Location within Panama
- Country: Panama
- Province: Herrera
- District: Parita

Area
  - Land: 10.6 km^{2} (4.1 sq mi)

Population (2010)
  - Total: 318
  - Density: 29.9/km^{2} (77/sq mi)
- Population density calculated based on land area.
- Time zone: UTC−5 (EST)

Llano de la Cruz is a corregimiento in Parita District, Herrera Province, Panama with a population of 318 as of 2010. Its population as of 1990 was 322; its population as of 2000 was 317.
