= Entradero del Castillo =

- Corregimiento
- Location within Panama
- Coordinates: 7°51′N 80°51′W
- Country: Panama
- Provinces: Herrera
- District: Ocú
- Time zone: UTC−5 (EST)

Entradero del Castillo is a corregimiento in Herrera Province in the Republic of Panama.
