= Sabanagrande, Herrera =

Coordinates: 7.8833°N 80.6333°W

Sabanagrande
- Corregimiento
- Location within Panama
- Country: Panama
- Province: Herrera
- District: Pesé

Area
  - Land: 58.4 km^{2} (22.5 sq mi)

Population (2010)
  - Total: 1,591
  - Density: 27.2/km^{2} (70/sq mi)
- Population density calculated based on land area.
- Time zone: UTC−5 (EST)

Sabanagrande is a corregimiento in Pesé District, Herrera Province, Panama with a population of 1,591 as of 2010. Its population as of 1990 was 1,692; its population as of 2000 was 1,698.
