= Los Castillos, Herrera =

Coordinates: 7.9833°N 80.6000°W

Los Castillos
- Corregimiento
- Location within Panama
- Country: Panama
- Province: Herrera
- District: Parita

Area
  - Land: 22.5 km^{2} (8.7 sq mi)

Population (2010)
  - Total: 745
  - Density: 33/km^{2} (85/sq mi)
- Population density calculated based on land area.
- Time zone: UTC−5 (EST)

Los Castillos is a corregimiento in Parita District, Herrera Province, Panama with a population of 745 as of 2010. Its population as of 1990 was 646; its population as of 2000 was 647.
