= Peñas Chatas =

Coordinates: 8.0167°N 80.8000°W

- Corregimiento
- Location within Panama
- Country: Panama
- Province: Herrera
- District: Ocú

Area
  - Land: 89.1 km^{2} (34.4 sq mi)

Population (2010)
  - Total: 1,778
  - Density: 20/km^{2} (52/sq mi)
- Population density calculated based on land area.
- Time zone: UTC−5 (EST)

Peñas Chatas is a corregimiento in Ocú District, Herrera Province, Panama with a population of 1,778 as of 2010. Its population as of 1990 was 1,836; its population as of 2000 was 1,811.
