= Llano Grande, Herrera =

Coordinates: 7.9667°N 80.7000°W

Llano Grande
- Corregimiento
- Location within Panama
- Country: Panama
- Province: Herrera
- District: Ocú

Area
  - Land: 71.1 km^{2} (27.5 sq mi)

Population (2010)
  - Total: 1,062
  - Density: 14.9/km^{2} (39/sq mi)
- Population density calculated based on land area.
- Time zone: UTC−5 (EST)

Llano Grande is a corregimiento in Ocú District, Herrera Province, Panama with a population of 1,062 as of 2010. Its population as of 1990 was 1,137; its population as of 2000 was 1,126.
