= La Pitaloza =

- Corregimiento
- Location within Panama
- Coordinates: 7°38′33″N 80°40′10″W
- Country: Panama
- Province: Herrera
- District: Los Pozos

Area
  - Land: 85.1 km^{2} (32.9 sq mi)

Population (2010)
  - Total: 674
  - Density: 7.9/km^{2} (20/sq mi)
- Population density calculated based on land area.
- Time zone: UTC−5 (EST)

La Pitaloza is a corregimiento in Los Pozos District, Herrera Province, Panama, with a population of 674 as of 2010. Its population as of 1990 was 1,656; its population as of 2000 was 1,458.
