= Quebrada del Rosario =

Coordinates: 7.7000°N 80.7000°W

- Corregimiento
- Location within Panama
- Country: Panama
- Province: Herrera
- District: Las Minas

Area
  - Land: 46.1 km^{2} (17.8 sq mi)

Population (2010)
  - Total: 794
  - Density: 17.2/km^{2} (45/sq mi)
- Population density calculated based on land area.
- Time zone: UTC−5 (EST)

Quebrada del Rosario is a corregimiento in Las Minas District, Herrera Province, Panama with a population of 794 as of 2010. Its population as of 1990 was 2,090; its population as of 2000 was 1,847.
