= Cabuya, Herrera =

Coordinates: 8.0311°N 80.6315°W

Cabuya
- Corregimiento
- Location within Panama
- Country: Panama
- Province: Herrera
- District: Parita

Area
  - Land: 59.5 km^{2} (23.0 sq mi)

Population (2010)
  - Total: 1,092
  - Density: 18.4/km^{2} (48/sq mi)
- Population density calculated based on land area.
- Time zone: UTC−5 (EST)

Cabuya is a corregimiento in Parita District, Herrera Province, Panama with a population of 1,092 as of 2010. Its population as of 1990 was 1,144; its population as of 2000 was 1,171.
