= Las Minas District =

- District

- Location of the district capital in Panama
- Coordinates: 7°48′0″N 80°44′24″W
- Country: Panama
- Province: Herrera
- Capital: Las Minas

Area
  - Total: 169 sq mi (437 km^{2})

Population (2000)
  - Total: 7,945
- Time zone: UTC-5 (ETZ)

Las Minas District is a district (distrito) of Herrera Province in Panama. The population according to the 2000 census was 7,945. The district covers a total area of 437 km^{2}. The capital lies at the city of Las Minas.

== Administrative divisions ==
Las Minas District is divided administratively into the following corregimientos:

- Las Minas (capital)
- Chepo
- Chumical
- El Toro
- Leones
- Quebrada del Rosario
- Quebrada El Ciprián
