= Chitré District =

- District

- Location of the district capital in Panama
- Coordinates: 7°58′N 80°26′W
- Country: Panama
- Province: Herrera Province
- Capital: Chitré

Area
  - Total: 35 sq mi (91 km^{2})

Population (2000)
  - Total: 42,467
- Time zone: UTC-5 (ETZ)

Chitré District is a district (distrito) of Herrera Province in Panama. The population according to the 2000 census was 42,467. The district covers a total area of 91 km^{2}. The capital lies at the city of Chitré.

== Administrative divisions ==
Chitré District is divided administratively into the following corregimientos:

- Chitré (capital)
- La Arena
- San Miguel de Monagrillo
- Llano Bonito
- San Juan Bautista
