= Llano Bonito =

Coordinates: 7.9667°N 80.4333°W

- Corregimiento
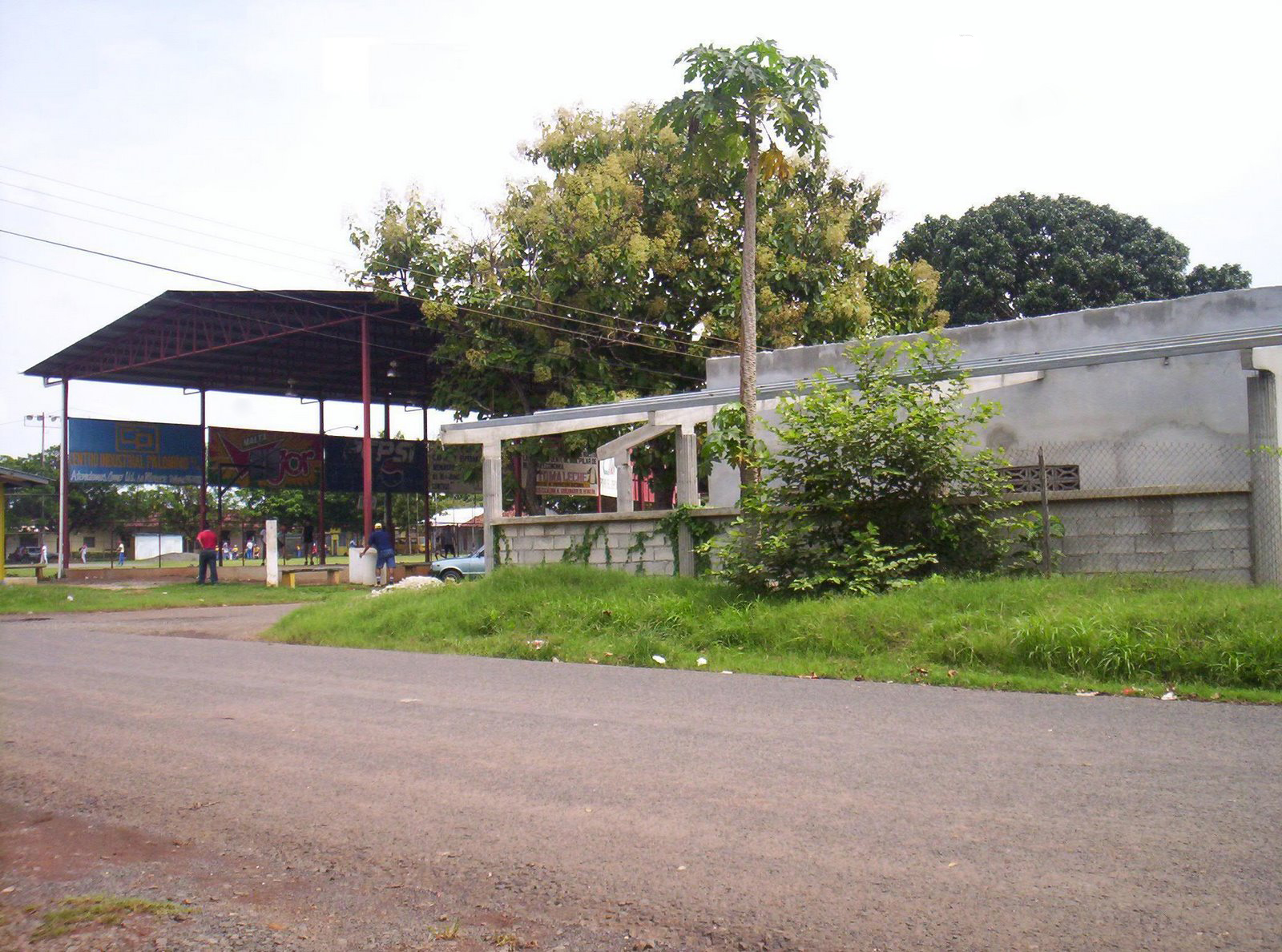
- Sports complex of Llano Bonito

- Location within Panama
- Country: Panama
- Province: Herrera
- District: Chitré
- Established: July 29, 1998

Area
  - Land: 10.9 km^{2} (4.2 sq mi)

Population (2010)
  - Total: 9,798
  - Density: 898.9/km^{2} (2,328/sq mi)
- Population density calculated based on land area.
- Time zone: UTC−5 (EST)
- Climate: Am

Llano Bonito is a corregimiento in Chitré District, Herrera Province, Panama with a population of 9,798 as of 2010. It was created by Law 58 of July 29, 1998, owing to the Declaration of Unconstitutionality of Law 1 of 1982. Its population as of 2000 was 8,088.
