= Minibar Delivery =

Alcohol delivery platform

- Website type: Private
- Founded: 2014
- Headquarters: 79 Madison Avenue, Madison Square North, New York City, New York, United States
- Founders: Lara Crystal, Lindsey Andrews
- Industry: Retail
- Services: Alcohol E-Commerce
- Employees: 40
- Website: www.minibardelivery.com
- Native clients on: iOS, Android

Minibar Delivery is an online alcohol service based in New York City, offering on-demand delivery in over 50 American cities and shipping to 40 states. It was founded in 2014 by Lara Crystal and Lindsey Andrews. Minibar Delivery connects customers with local liquor stores as well as vineyards for delivery to their location via the company's mobile app and website.

== History ==
Minibar Delivery was founded in 2014 by Lara Crystal and Lindsey Andrews, who were classmates at the Wharton School of the University of Pennsylvania. The two conceived the idea during a takeout Tuesday at their apartment when they ran out of alcohol and neither of them wanted to go to the store. Crystal is the former vice president of marketing at the e-commerce site Rent the Runway, while Andrews had various marketing roles at FreshDirect, Soap.com, and Wag.com. They began by partnering with local liquor stores to offer on-demand delivery in 30–60 minutes.

In October 2014, Minibar Delivery opened up their services in Chicago, forming agreements with Un-Cork It wine store and sandwich shop Milk & More. The company opened in San Francisco the same month. By 2015, Minibar Delivery expanded to serve wider New York, Los Angeles, Jersey City, The Hamptons, Ithaca, Dallas, Hoboken, Westchester, Silicon Valley, Palm Beach, and Miami. That same year, the company acquired Booze Carriage, a New York City-based on-demand alcohol delivery company.

In July 2017, TechCrunch reported that Minibar Delivery raised an additional $5M in seed funding, led by Corigin Ventures, with participation from Female Founders Fund, Winklevoss Capital, LaunchCapital and RiverPark Ventures, among others. The same month, they formed an agreement with Total Wine & More to launch an on-demand two-hour alcohol delivery service in Arlington, Virginia. In 2018, they expanded this partnership to many more cities in the state of Virginia such as Richmond, Newport News, Virginia Beach, Norfolk and more. In September 2017, Minibar Delivery began operations in Baltimore.

As of February 2018, Minibar Delivery had raised $6.8 million in seed funding. In July 2018 Minibar Delivery formed a partnership with BevMo! in California.

In November 2021, Minibar was acquired by ReserveBar.

== Description ==
Minibar Delivery is headquartered at 79 Madison Avenue, Madison Square North, New York City. It does not hold any inventory, rather the company serves as a platform via their mobile app and website to connect customers with local liquor stores that will deliver to their location Customers can use the service for on-demand alcohol delivery to their location in 30–60 minutes, shop directly from vineyards, book a bartender on demand, access a trained concierge service for wine recommendations and cocktail recipes, and subscribe for auto-renewed orders in 1, 2, 3, and 4 week intervals. Orders can only be delivered during opening hours of the store providers. The company also offers an event planning calculator to help predict the amount of type of alcohol required for parties. Minibar Delivery takes a small marketing fee from its store partners. Minibar Delivery also has partnerships with brands. For example, they worked with St-Germain to allow customers to order bartenders on French-style bikes for delivery in New York City.

In September 2017, Minibar Delivery expanded its on-demand deliveries to nationwide shipping with the launch of its Vineyard Select service. As of 2018, Minibar Delivery has over 200 partners and delivers to over 40 cities in the US.
