= Los Pozos District =

- District

- Location of the district capital in Panama
- Coordinates: 7°48′N 80°38′W
- Country: Panama
- Province: Herrera Province
- Capital: Los Pozos

Area
  - Total: 148 sq mi (383 km^{2})

Population (2000)
  - Total: 7,827
- Time zone: UTC-5 (ETZ)

Los Pozos District (Spanish pronunciation: [los ˈposos]) is a district (distrito) of Herrera Province in Panama. The population according to the 2000 census was 7,827. The district covers a total area of 383 km^{2}. The capital lies at the city of Los Pozos.

== Administrative divisions ==
Los Pozos District is divided administratively into the following corregimientos:

- Los Pozos (capital)
- El Capurí
- El Calabacito
- El Cedro
- La Arena
- La Pitaloza
- Los Cerritos
- Los Cerros de Paja
- Las Llanas

== Culture ==
A picture of a woman in traditional dress.

Los Pozos, as the district of Herrera, is known for its rich culture of music and clothing. Tipico music is the traditional music and dance is most often enjoyed in the district. Men usually wear a typical straw hat and white traditional button down shirt. Women, during festivals, will dress in elaborate dresses and hair styles.

This district is also well known for a common greeting, mostly by men but also by women, called a grito. The sound is similar to a short howl. The greeting was originally developed by field workers as a way to avoid one another while working in tall grasses with machettees. While this type of work has greatly decreased, the greeting has remained. Passers by often greet one another with it and may recognize one another before seeing each other by the sound of their grito. During celebrations, it is common for a group of people to form a circle and yell grito's at one another.

A picture of a man wearing typical Panamanian straw hat and white shirt.
