= Tebario =

- Corregimiento
- Location within Panama
- Coordinates: 7.7333°N 80.9500°W
- Country: Panama
- Province: Veraguas
- District: Mariato

Area
  - Land: 313.3 km^{2} (121.0 sq mi)

Population (2010)
  - Total: 599
  - Density: 1.9/km^{2} (4.9/sq mi)
- Population density calculated based on land area.
- Time zone: UTC−5 (EST)

Tebario is a corregimiento in Mariato District, Veraguas Province, Panama with a population of 599 as of 2010. Its population as of 1990 was 615; its population as of 2000 was 959.
