= Parita District =

- District

- Location of the district capital in Panama
- Coordinates: 8°0′0″N 80°30′36″W
- Country: Panama
- Province: Herrera Province
- Capital: Parita

Area
  - Total: 141 sq mi (364 km^{2})

Population (2000)
  - Total: 8,827
- Time zone: UTC-5 (ETZ)

Parita District is a district (distrito) of Herrera Province in Panama. The population according to the 2000 census was 8,827. The district covers a total area of 364 km^{2} (141 sq mi). The capital lies at the city of Parita.

== Administrative divisions ==
Parita District is divided administratively into the following corregimientos:

- Parita (capital)
- Cabuya
- Los Castillos
- Llano de la Cruz
- París
- Portobelillo
- Potuga
