= Ocú =

- Town and corregimiento
- Location within Panama
- Coordinates: 7°56′24″N 80°46′48″W
- Country: Panama
- Province: Herrera
- District: Ocú

Area
  - Land: 121.6 km^{2} (47.0 sq mi)

Population (2010)
  - Total: 7,006
  - Density: 57.6/km^{2} (149/sq mi)
- Population density calculated based on land area.
- Time zone: UTC−5 (EST)
- Climate: Aw

Ocú is a town and corregimiento in Ocú District, Herrera Province, Panama with a population of 7,006 as of 2010. It is the seat of Ocú District. Its population as of 1990 was 7,488; its population as of 2000 was 8,150.

Ocú is recognized as one of the most authentic towns regarding Panamanian folklore and is recognized nationally for the Manito Festival held annually in the second week of August.
