= Parce (rum) =

- Type: Rum
- Origin: Panama
- Introduced: 2014
- Website: Parce Rum website

Parce (pronounced par-say) is a brand of rum from Colombia.

== History ==
Parce was founded by Jim Powers and his two brothers Patrick and Brian in 2012. Previously all from Chicago, Jim was living in New York City and working in A&R while Brian was living in Vail, Colorado. Patrick had been in Colombia since the 1990s to expand the family's water, oil and gas pipeline business. The brothers all met in Colombia three months after their dad died in 2010. They decided to make a sipping rum in honor of their father. The brothers employed Arthur Fernandes and Brojen Domecq Fernandes as master blenders.

Parce debuted at the Pitchfork Music Festival in Chicago in 2014. Distribution began in Illinois, New York, Washington, Kansas, and Arkansas and sold 25,000 750-milliliter bottles in its first 18 months in operation. Parce also began shipping to France, Germany, and South Korea shortly thereafter.

== Description ==
The Parce Rum company is based in Chicago, Illinois. Its rum is blended, distilled, racked and aged in Pesé, Panama using sugar cane harvested in Colombia, Trinidad, and Panama.
