= Arenas, Panama =

Coordinates: 7.3667°N 80.8500°W

Arenas
- Corregimiento
- Location within Panama
- Country: Panama
- Province: Veraguas
- District: Mariato

Area
  - Land: 232.3 km^{2} (89.7 sq mi)

Population (2010)
  - Total: 663
  - Density: 2.9/km^{2} (7.5/sq mi)
- Population density calculated based on land area.
- Time zone: UTC−5 (EST)

Arenas is a corregimiento in Mariato District, Veraguas Province, Panama with a population of 663 as of 2010. Its population as of 1990 was 1,459; its population as of 2000 was 1,163.
