= Las Cabras, Herrera =

Coordinates: 7.8833°N 80.5500°W

Las Cabras
- Corregimiento
- Location within Panama
- Country: Panama
- Province: Herrera
- District: Pesé

Area
  - Land: 59 km^{2} (23 sq mi)

Population (2010)
  - Total: 1,914
  - Density: 32.4/km^{2} (84/sq mi)
- Population density calculated based on land area.
- Time zone: UTC−5 (EST)

Las Cabras is a corregimiento in Pesé District, Herrera Province, Panama with a population of 1,914 as of 2010. Its population as of 1990 was 1,686; its population as of 2000 was 1,834.
