= El Cacao, Veraguas =

Coordinates: 7.3333°N 80.8667°W

El Cacao
- Corregimiento
- Location within Panama
- Country: Panama
- Province: Veraguas
- District: Mariato
- Established: June 25, 2001

Area
  - Land: 411.1 km^{2} (158.7 sq mi)

Population (2010)
  - Total: 529
  - Density: 1.3/km^{2} (3.4/sq mi)
- Population density calculated based on land area.
- Time zone: UTC−5 (EST)

El Cacao is a corregimiento in Mariato District, Veraguas Province, Panama with a population of 529 as of 2010. It was created by Law 27 of June 25, 2001.
