= Isla de Cañas, Los Santos =

Isla de Cañas
- Corregimiento
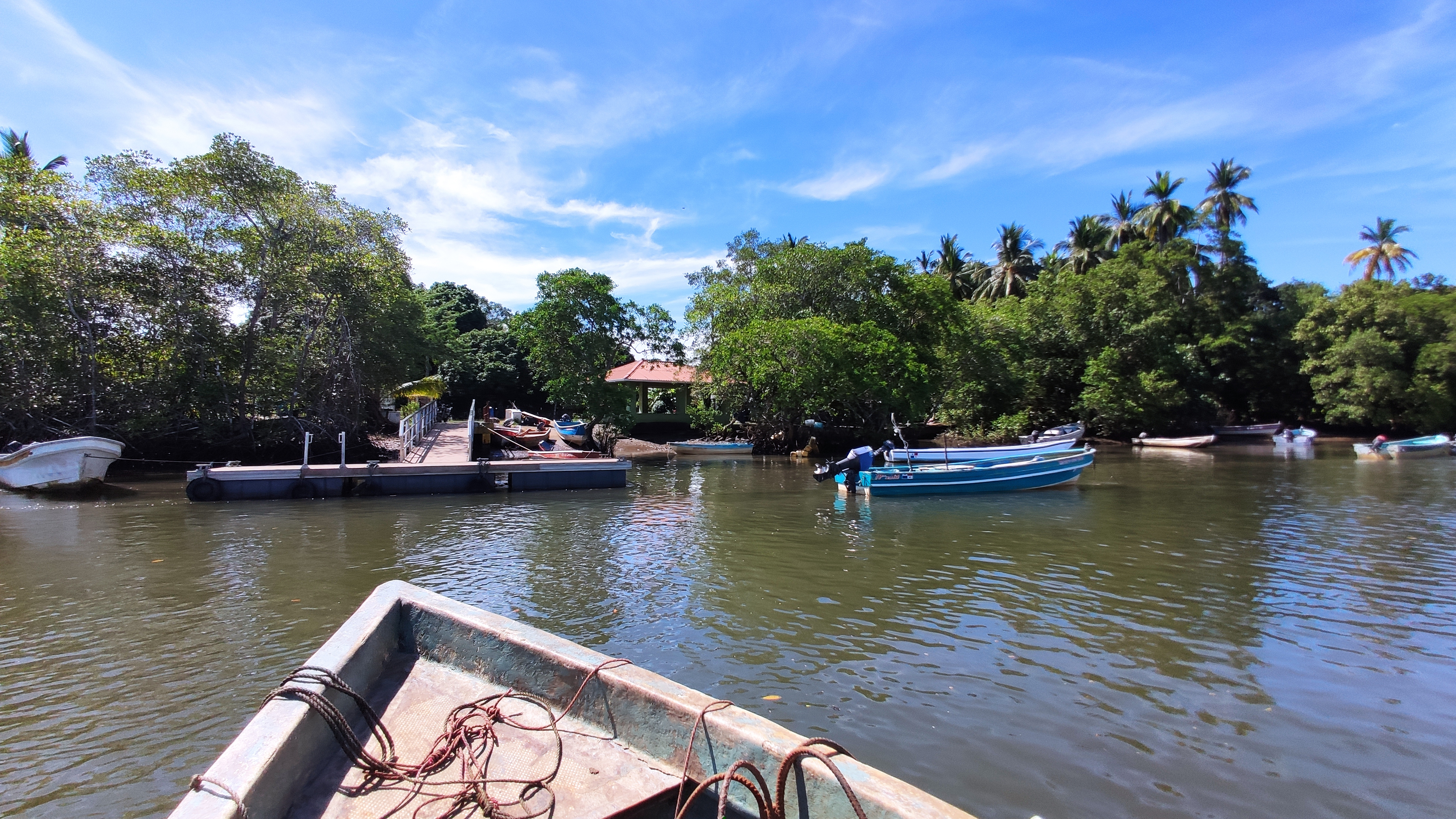

- Location within Panama
- Coordinates: 7°24′52″N 80°18′51″W
- Country: Panama
- Province: Los Santos
- District: Tonosí
- Established: October 18, 2003

Area
  - Land: 24.5 km^{2} (9.5 sq mi)

Population (2010)
  - Total: 397
  - Density: 16.2/km^{2} (42/sq mi)
- Population density calculated based on land area.
- Time zone: UTC−5 (EST)

Isla de Cañas is a corregimiento in Tonosí District, Los Santos Province, Panama with a population of 397 as of 2010. It was created by Law 61 of October 18, 2003.

Approximately 10,000 turtles nest on its beaches each year, predominantly leatherback (Dermochelys coriacea), loggerhead (Caretta caretta), and olive ridley (Lepidochelys olivacea) turtles. On Isla Cañas, sea turtle nesting tours are offered from July to December. The island's beach is special because it is one of only 11 beaches in the world where olive ridley turtles nest. Only 2 kilometers of the beach are within a protected area. If turtles lay their eggs outside this area, the eggs are transferred to a hatchery with a capacity of 140,000 eggs. The turtles take 45 days to hatch, and hatching tours are also offered from September to January.

== Image gallery ==
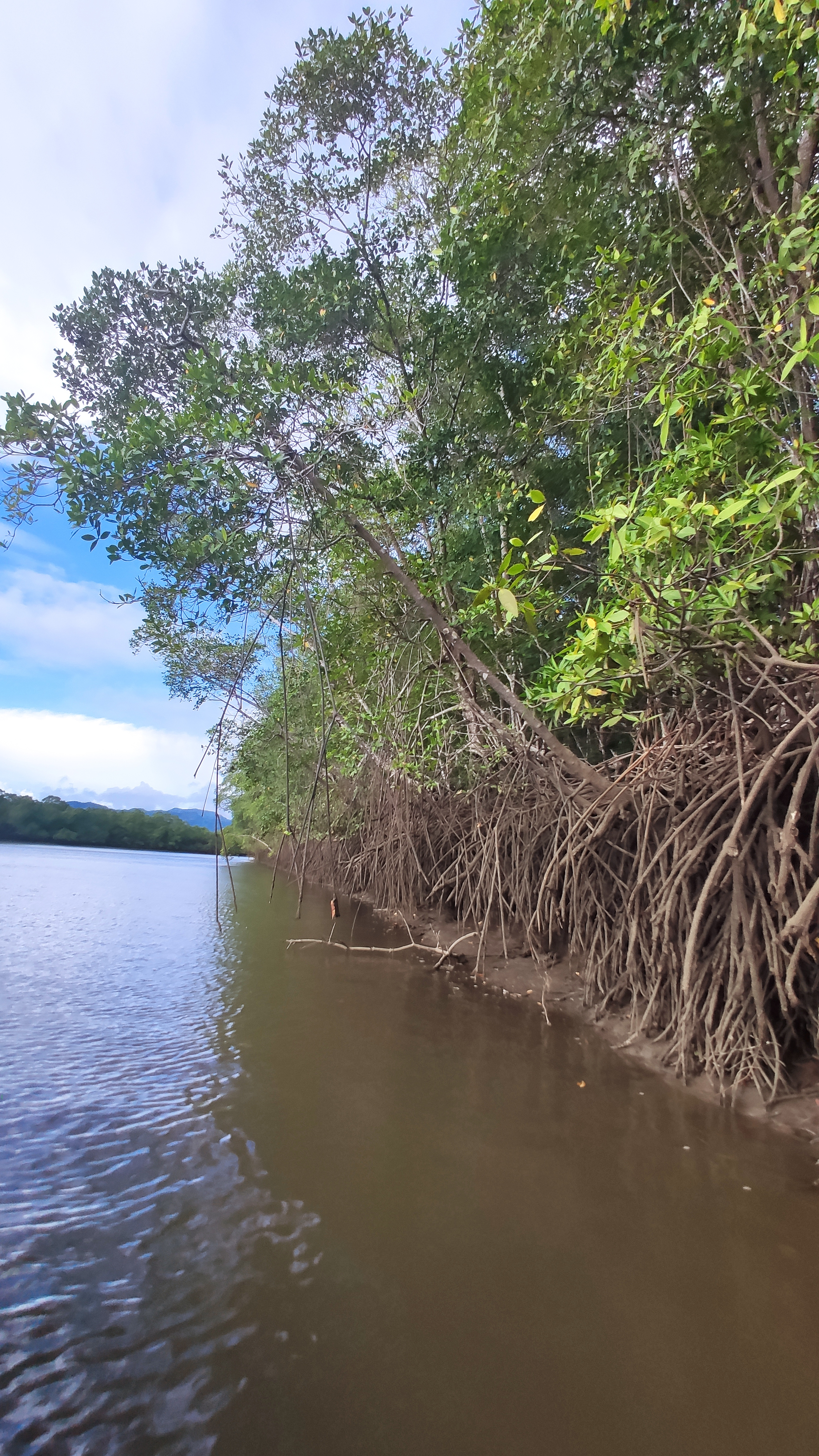
Isla Cañas Mangrove

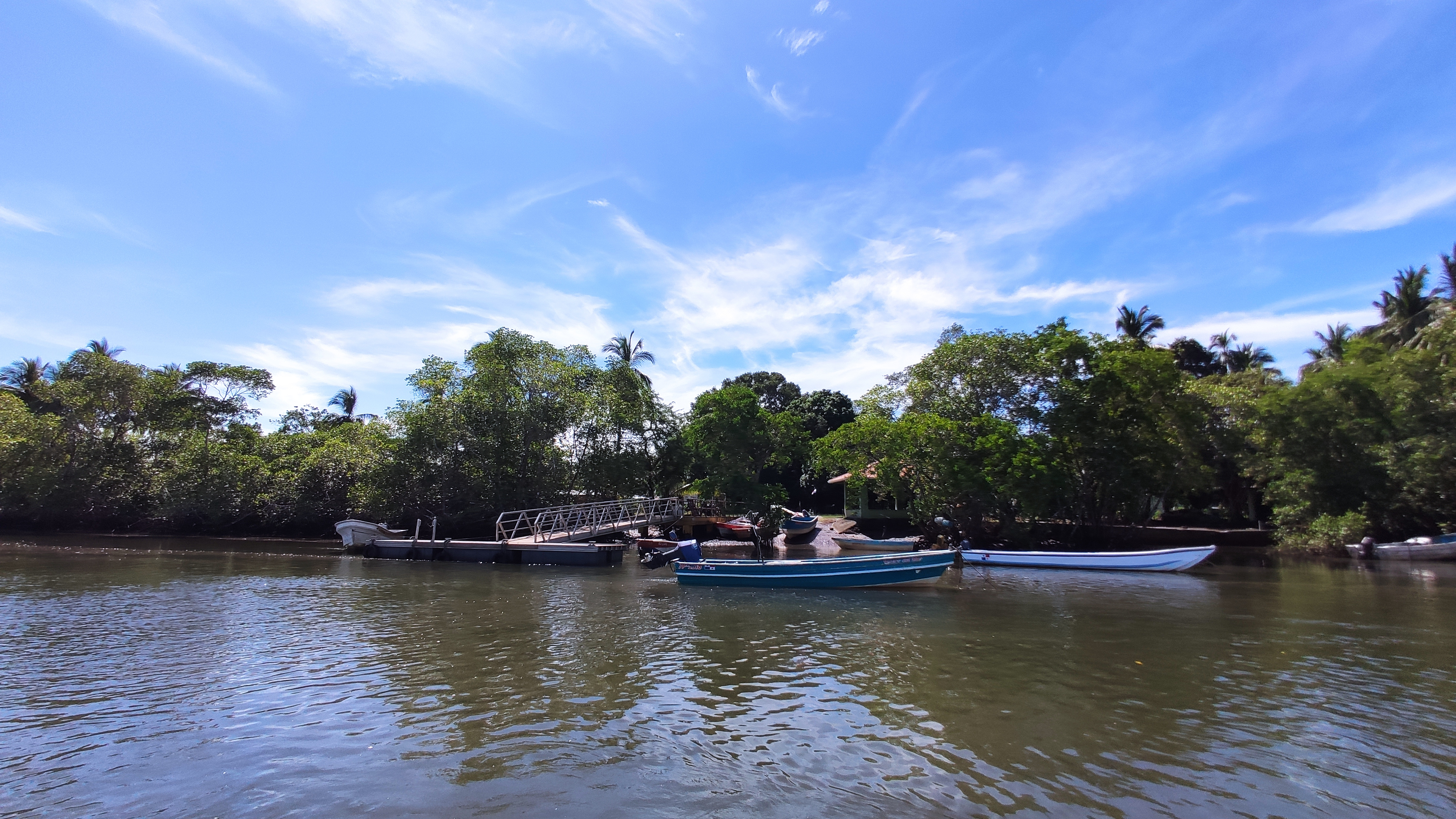
Isla Cañas Port

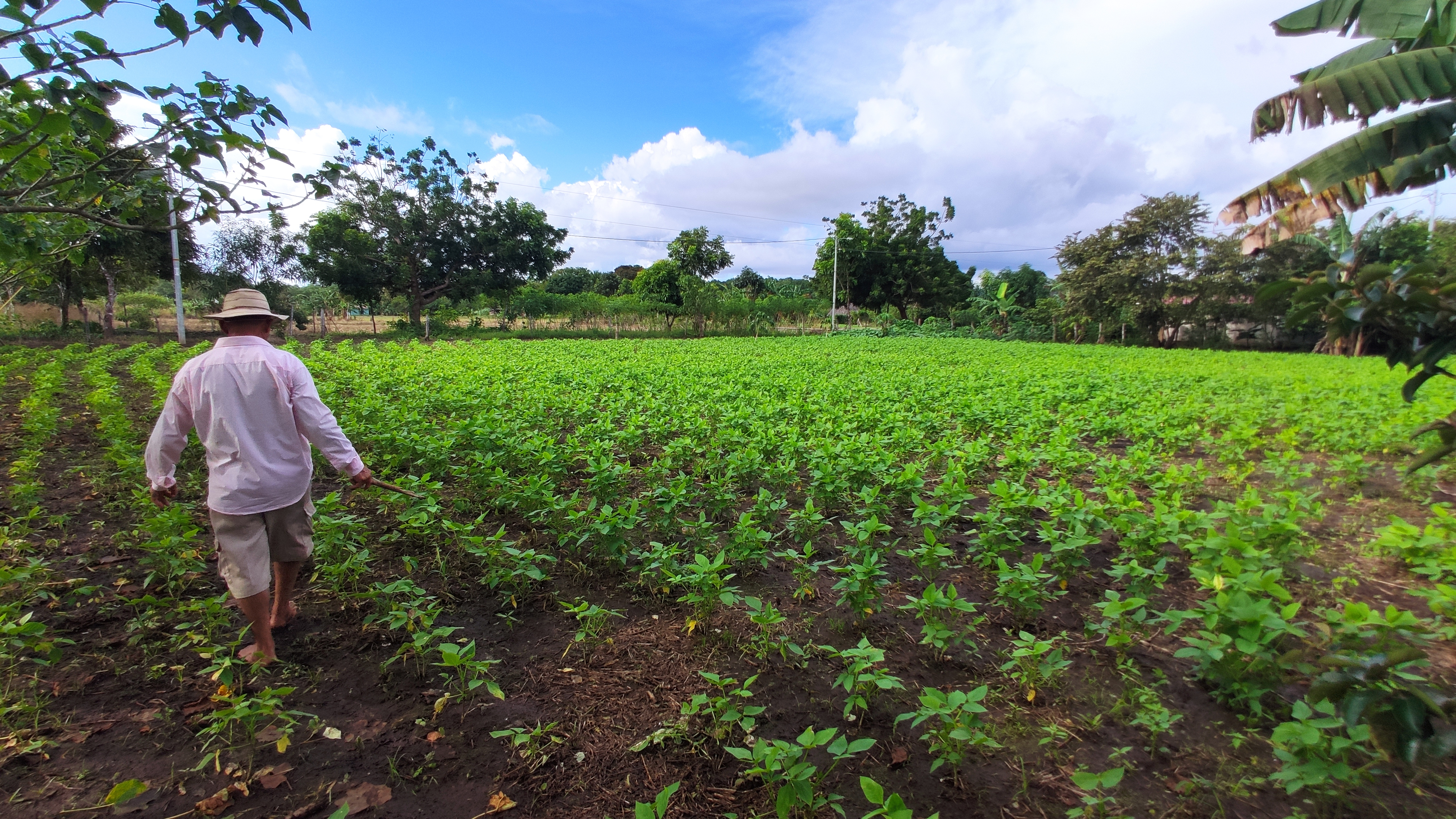
Isla Cañas crops

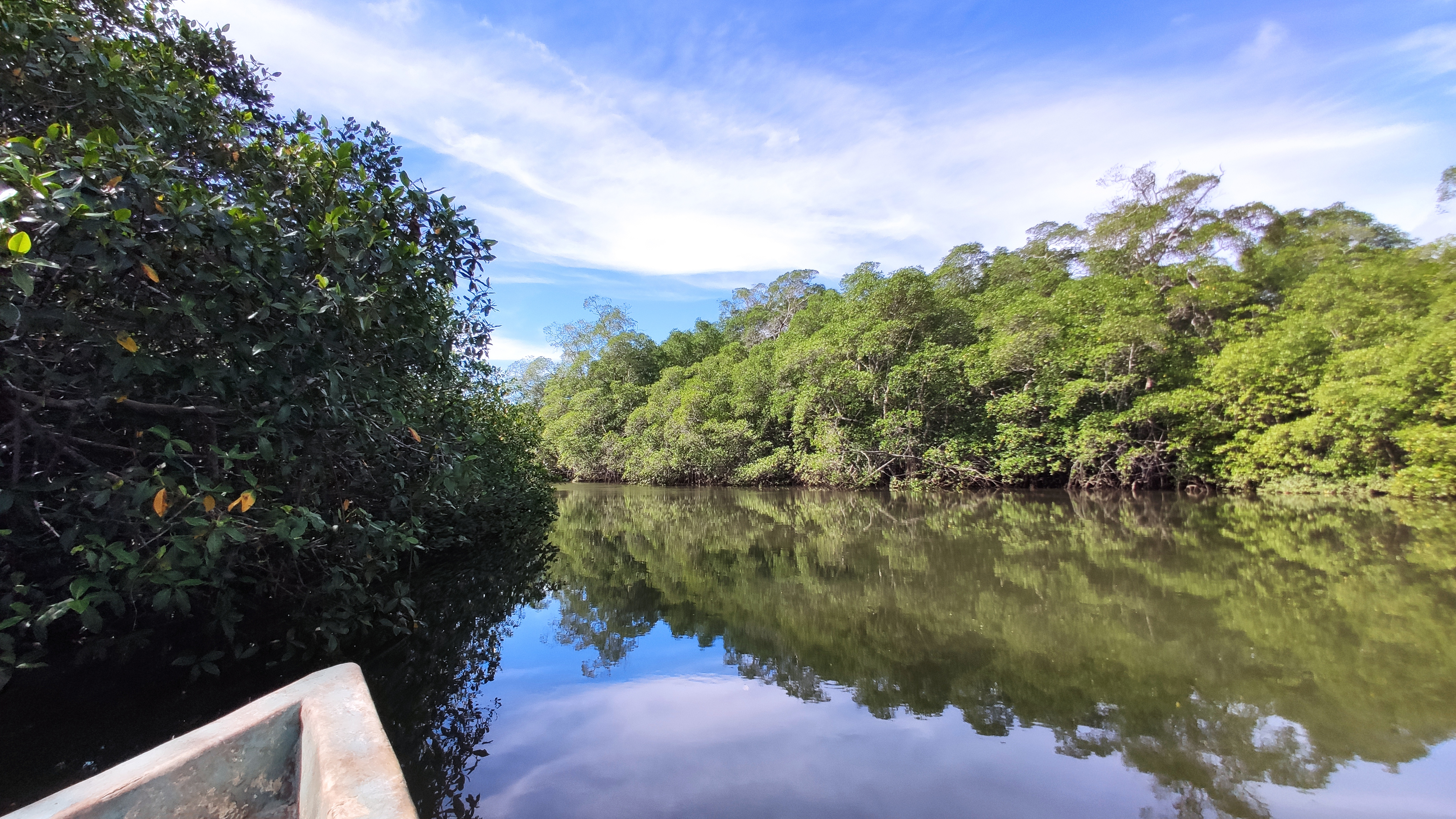
Isla Cañas Mangrove

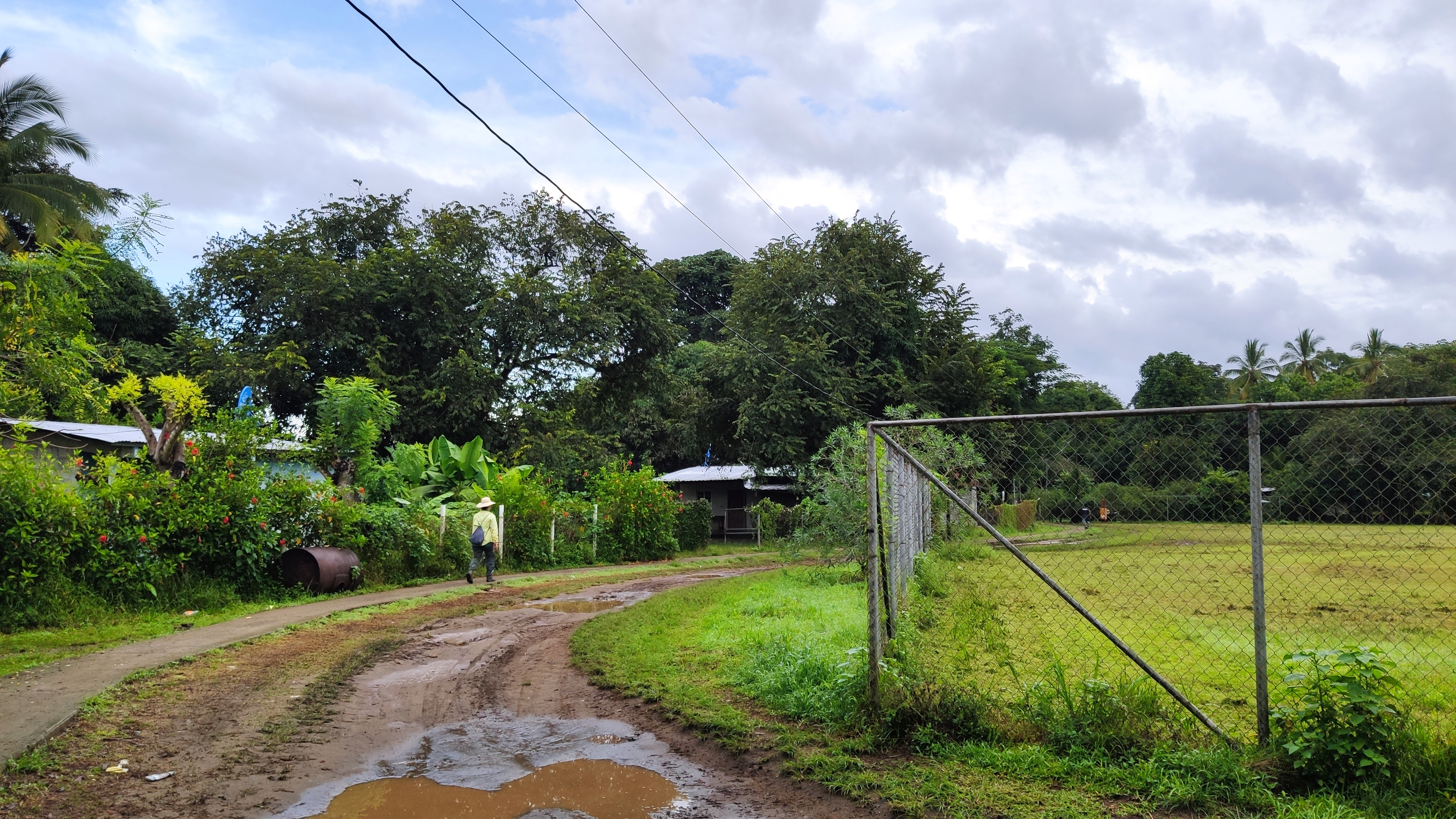
Isla Cañas village

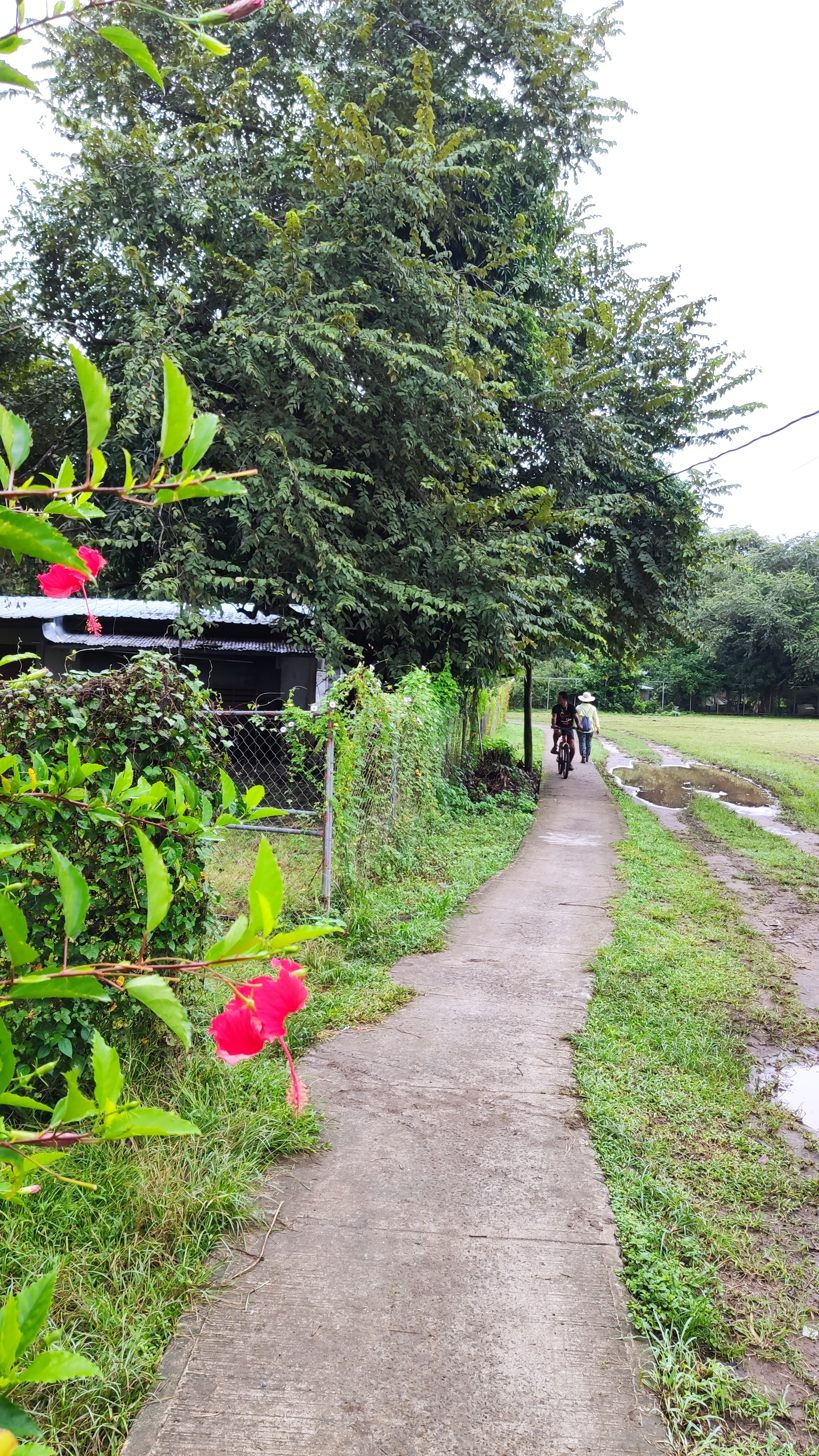
Isla Cañas village

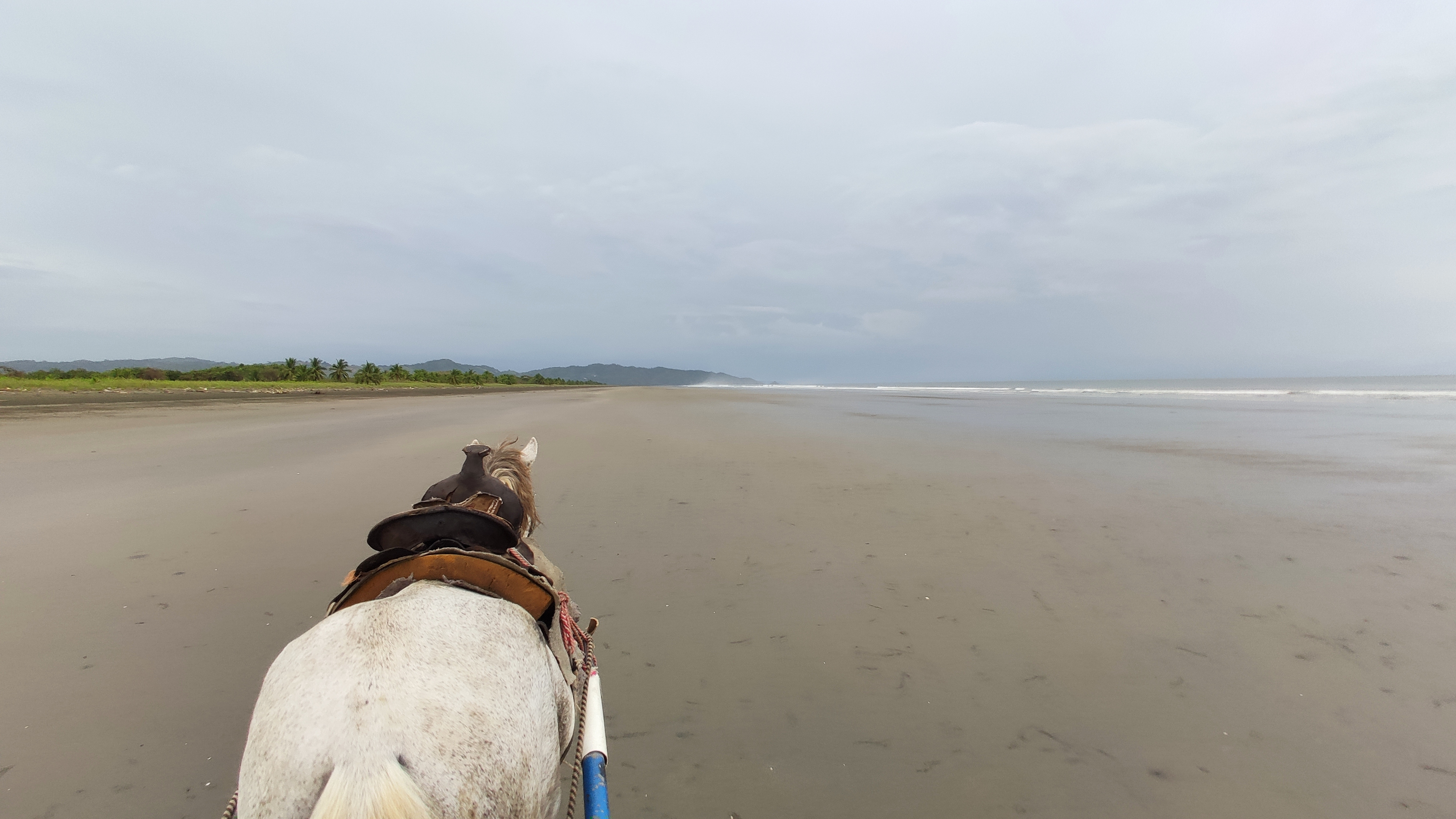
Isla Cañas beach

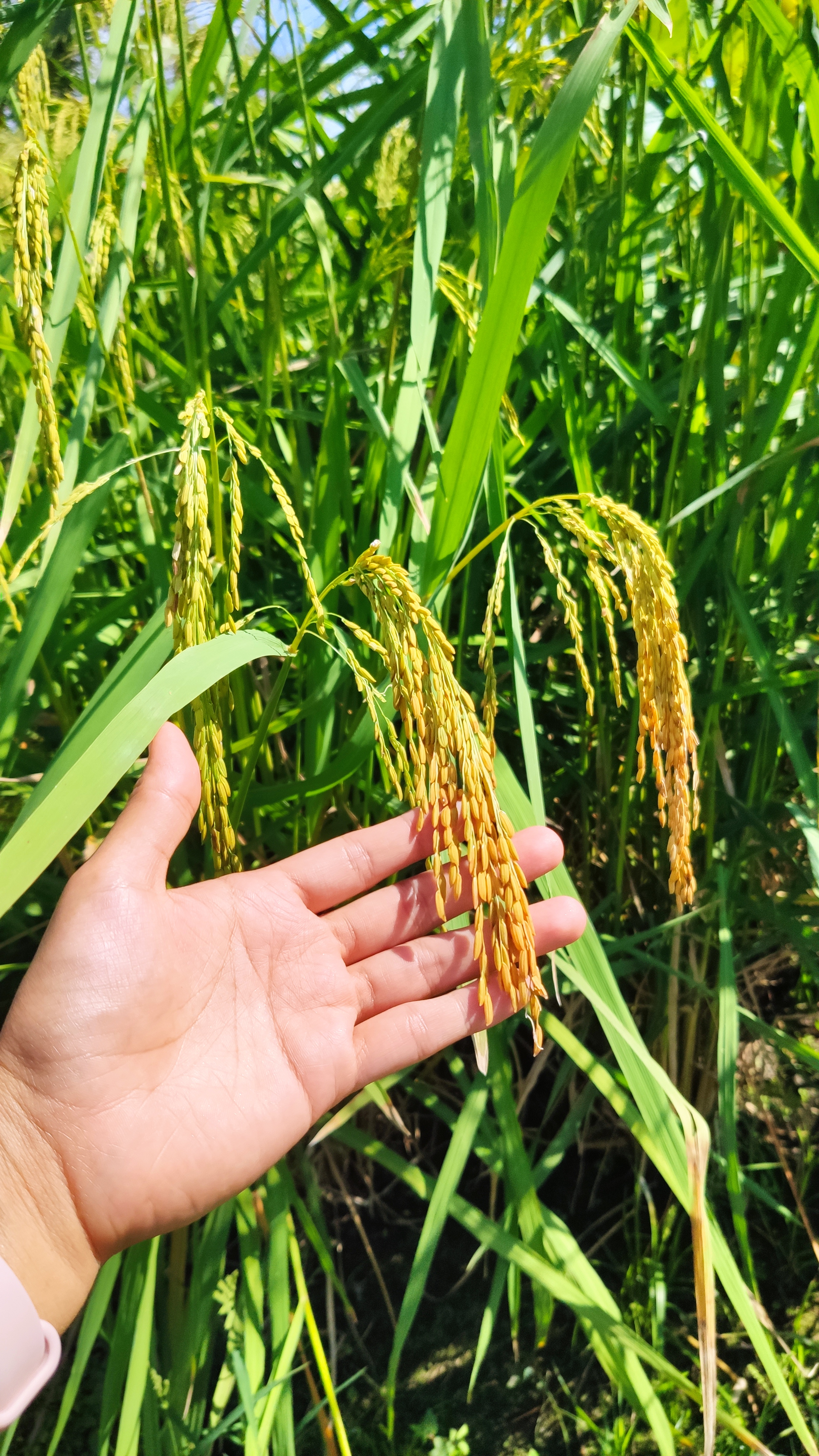
Rice crops Isla Cañas

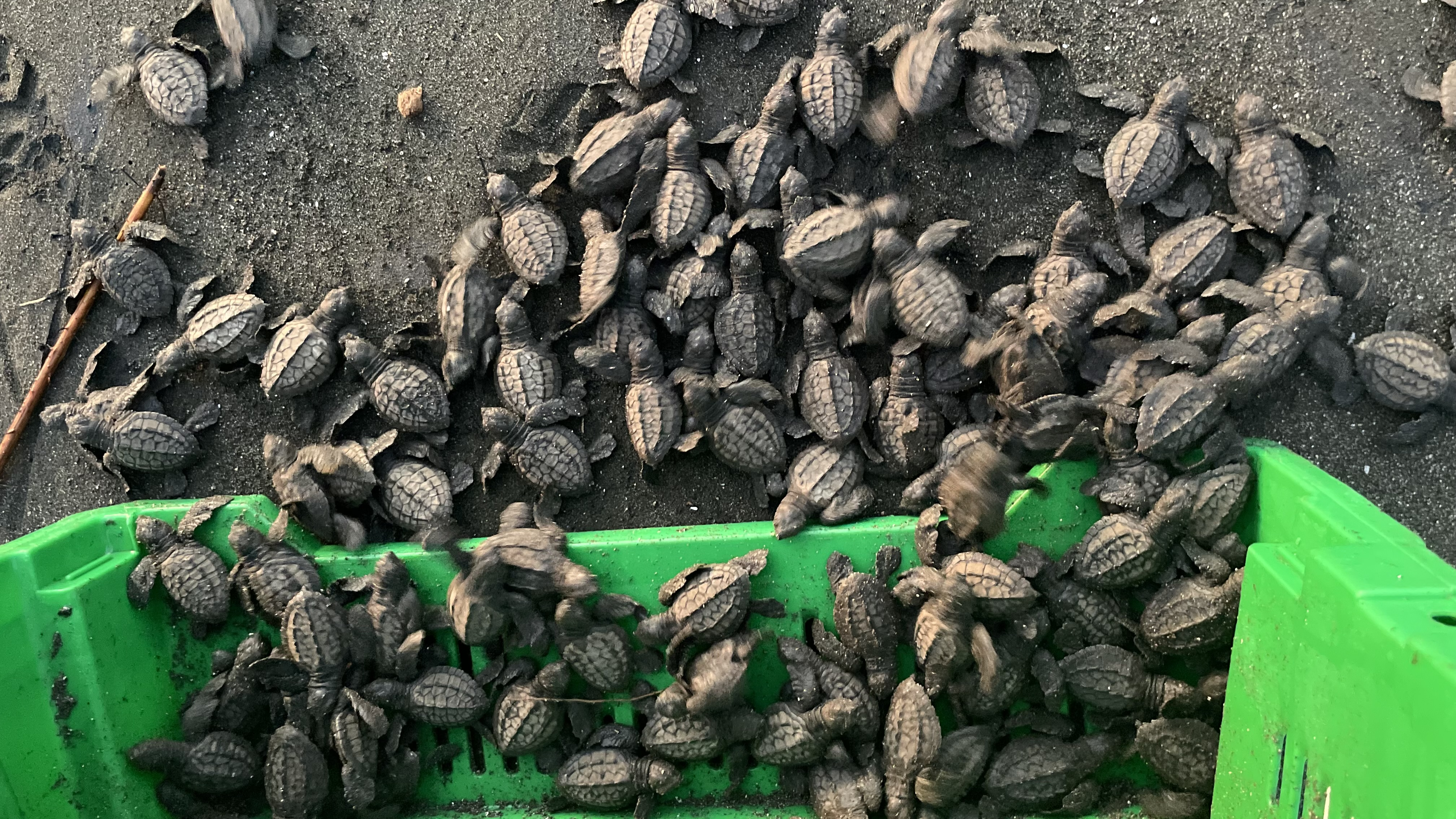
Baby turtles being born

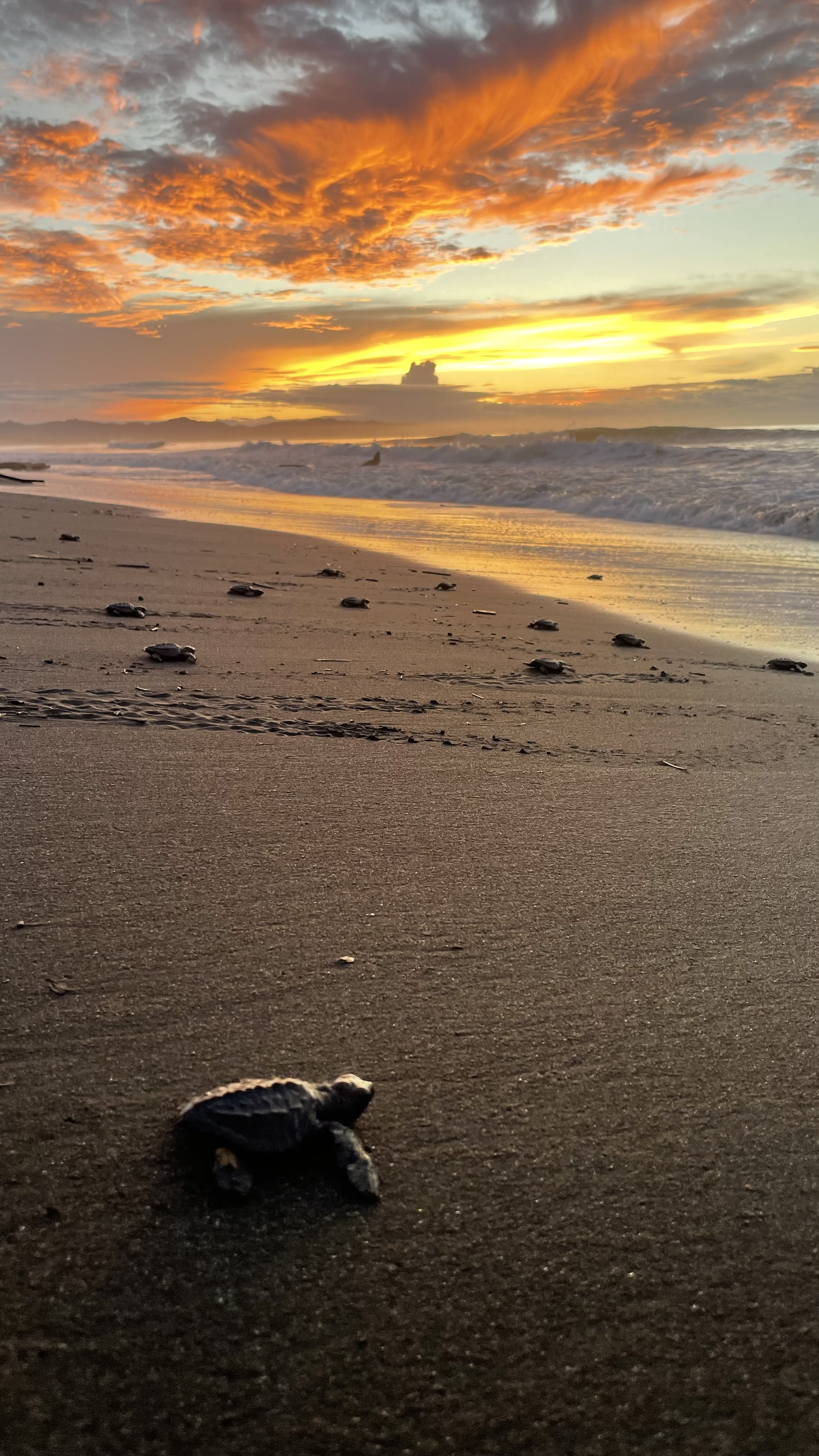
Baby turtle at sunrise in Isla Cañas

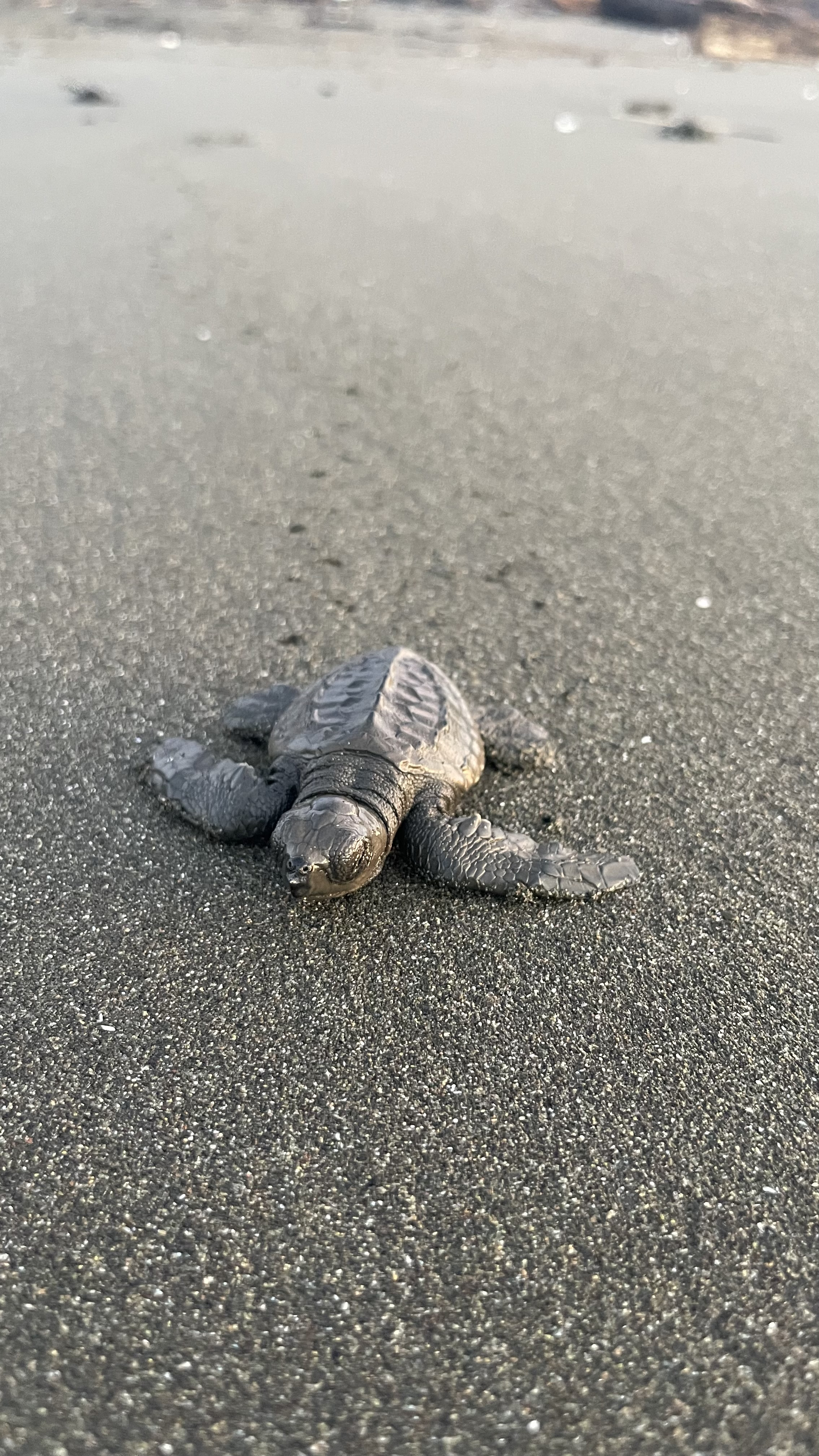
Baby turtle in Isla Cañas
