= Time in Panama =

- Time zone: Eastern Standard Time
- Initials: EST
- UTC offset: UTC−5

Daylight saving time
- DST not observed

tz database
- America/Panama

Since April 22, 1908, Panama observes Eastern Standard Zone (UTC−5) year-round. It has never observed daylight saving time.

== IANA time zone database ==
In the IANA time zone database, Panama is given one zone in the file zone.tab—America/Panama. "PA" refers to the country's ISO 3166-1 alpha-2 country code. Data for Panama directly from zone.tab of the IANA time zone database; columns marked with * are the columns from zone.tab itself:

c.c.*	coordinates*	TZ*	Comments	UTC offset	DST
PA	+0858−07932	America/Panama	EST – ON (Atikokan), NU (Coral H)	−05:00	−05:00
