= Leones, Herrera =

Coordinates: 7.7667°N 80.8500°W

Leones
- Corregimiento
- Location within Panama
- Country: Panama
- Province: Herrera
- District: Las Minas

Area
  - Land: 72.3 km^{2} (27.9 sq mi)

Population (2010)
  - Total: 852
  - Density: 11.8/km^{2} (31/sq mi)
- Population density calculated based on land area.
- Time zone: UTC−5 (EST)

Leones is a corregimiento in Las Minas District, Herrera Province, Panama with a population of 852 as of 2010. Its population as of 1990 was 1,193; its population as of 2000 was 941.
