= Cerro Largo, Herrera =

Coordinates: 7.8399°N 80.8307°W

Cerro Largo
- Corregimiento
- Location within Panama
- Country: Panama
- Province: Herrera
- District: Ocú

Area
  - Land: 106.5 km^{2} (41.1 sq mi)

Population (2010)
  - Total: 1,478
  - Density: 13.9/km^{2} (36/sq mi)
- Population density calculated based on land area.
- Time zone: UTC−5 (EST)

Cerro Largo is a corregimiento in Ocú District, Herrera Province, Panama with a population of 1,478 as of 2010. Its population as of 1990 was 2,121; its population as of 2000 was 1,800.
