= Parita =

- Town and corregimiento
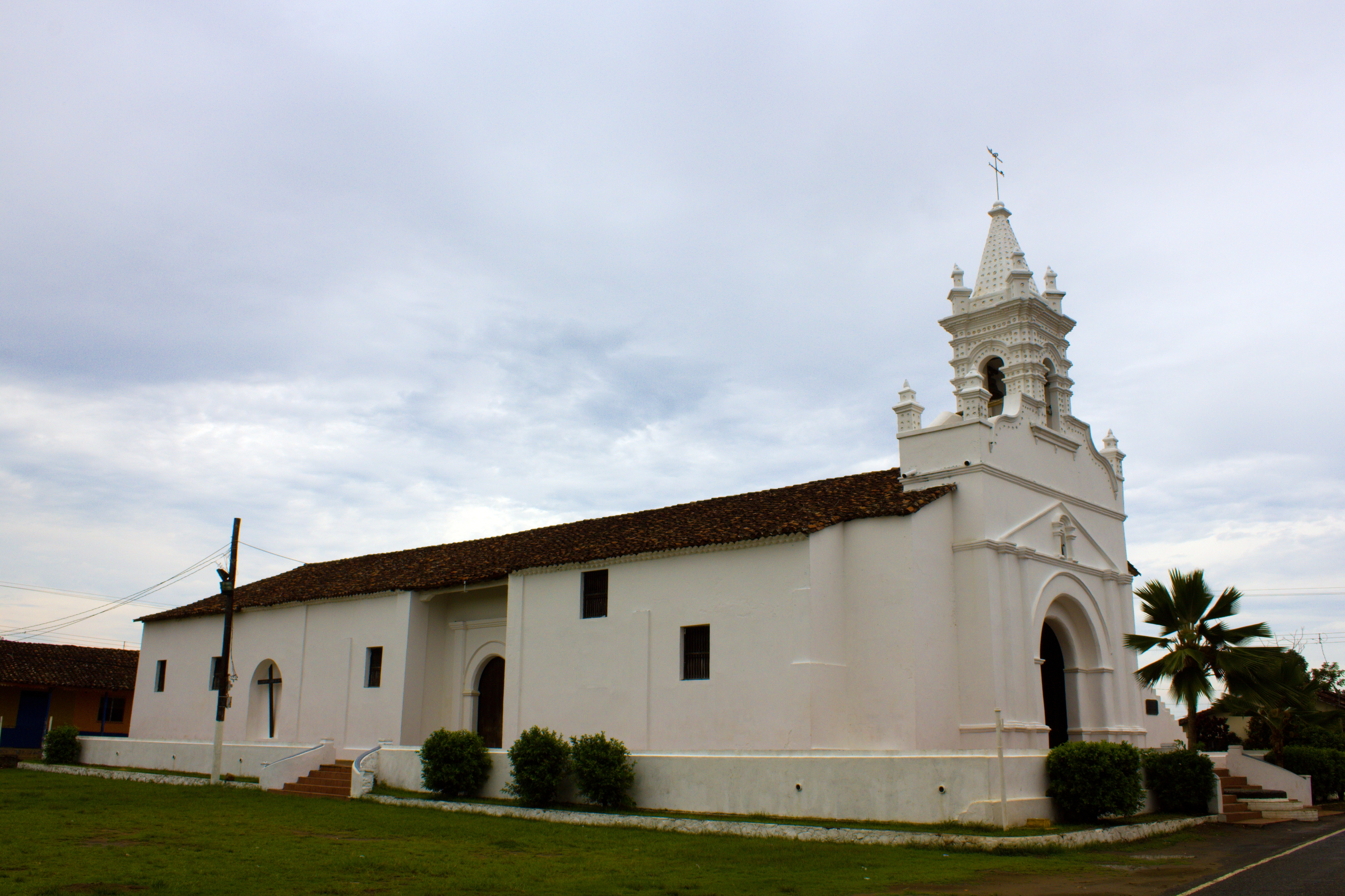
- Iglesia de Santo Domingo de Guzmán, Parita

- Location within Panama
- Coordinates: 8°0′0″N 80°30′36″W
- Country: Panama
- Province: Herrera
- District: Parita
- Founded: 1556

Area
  - Land: 108.2 km^{2} (41.8 sq mi)

Population (2010)
  - Total: 3,723
  - Density: 34.4/km^{2} (89/sq mi)
- Population density calculated based on land area.
- Time zone: UTC−5 (EST)

Parita is a town and corregimiento in Parita District, Herrera Province, Panama with a population of 3,723 as of 2010. It is the seat of Parita District. It was founded in 1556. Its population as of 1990 was 3,257; its population as of 2000 was 3,616.

== History ==
Before the Spanish conquest, this town was the capital of the Kingdom of Parita.
