= ReserveBar =

American online alcohol marketplace

- Company type: Private
- Industry: Retail
- Founded: 2013; 13 years ago
- Founder: Lindsay Held; Jeff Carton
- Key people: Lindsay Held, CEO
- Services: Alcohol e-commerce
- Website: www.reservebar.com

ReserveBar is an American online marketplace that facilitates the delivery and shipping of premium and luxury spirits, wine, and champagne from licensed liquor stores.

It is also known for its partnerships with celebrities to launch their alcohol brands, including Bruno Mars, Ryan Reynolds, Bob Dylan, Breaking Bad stars Aaron Paul and Bryan Cranston, and George Clooney, among others.

== History and timeline ==
Dartmouth College alumni Lindsay Held and Jeff Carton founded ReserveBar in 2013 after they found out that there was no online service to send a few bottles of premium vodka to their friend across the country.

The biggest alcohol distributor in the US, Southern Glazer's Wine and Spirits acquired an equity stake in ReserveBar in March 2021, one month after Uber agreed to buy another alcohol e-commerce platform Drizly.

Also, in March 2021 ReserveBar teamed up with Condé Nast’s Epicurious to create the Epicurious Interactive Cocktail Cabinet, a cocktail recipe discovery tool.

In July 2021, the company closed Series B financing.

In November 2021, ReserveBar acquired an online alcohol retailer Minibar Delivery.

== Spirited Change Initiative ==
Less than 5% of the alcohol industry represents BIPOC or female entrepreneurs, according to ReserveBar. ReserveBar has supported minority- and women-owned alcohol brands since 2020. In August 2021, the company announced it will spend $5 million to market BIPOC and female entrepreneurs through its Spirited Change Initiative. Mary J. Blige, Sean Combs, Kevin Durant and Rich Kleiman joined the initiative as investors.
