= Quebro =

- Corregimiento
- Location within Panama
- Coordinates: 7.358842°N 80.9499956°W
- Country: Panama
- Province: Veraguas
- District: Mariato

Area
  - Land: 349.4 km^{2} (134.9 sq mi)

Population (2010)
  - Total: 1,129
  - Density: 3.2/km^{2} (8.3/sq mi)
- Population density calculated based on land area.
- Time zone: UTC−5 (EST)

Quebro is a corregimiento in Mariato District, Veraguas Province, Panama with a population of 1,129 as of 2010. Its population as of 1990 was 1,050; its population as of 2000 was 1,060.
