= Llano de Catival o Mariato =

Coordinates: 7.7167°N 80.9667°W

- Corregimiento
- Location within Panama
- Country: Panama
- Province: Veraguas
- District: Mariato

Area
  - Land: 75.3 km^{2} (29.1 sq mi)

Population (2010)
  - Total: 2,376
  - Density: 31.5/km^{2} (82/sq mi)
- Population density calculated based on land area.
- Time zone: UTC−5 (EST)
- Climate: Am

Llano de Catival o Mariato is a corregimiento in Mariato District, Veraguas Province, Panama with a population of 2,376 as of 2010. It is the seat of Mariato District. Its population as of 1990 was 2,052; its population as of 2000 was 2,269.
