= El Cedro, Herrera =

Coordinates: 7.6833°N 80.6500°W

El Cedro
- Corregimiento
- Location within Panama
- Country: Panama
- Province: Herrera
- District: Los Pozos

Area
  - Land: 34.1 km^{2} (13.2 sq mi)

Population (2010)
  - Total: 503
  - Density: 14.8/km^{2} (38/sq mi)
- Population density calculated based on land area.
- Time zone: UTC−5 (EST)

El Cedro is a corregimiento in Los Pozos District, Herrera Province, Panama with a population of 503 as of 2010. Its population as of 1990 was 543; its population as of 2000 was 539.
