= El Pedregoso, Herrera =

Coordinates: 7.9167°N 80.6167°W

El Pedregoso
- Corregimiento
- Location within Panama
- Country: Panama
- Province: Herrera
- District: Pesé

Area
  - Land: 31.3 km^{2} (12.1 sq mi)

Population (2010)
  - Total: 1,386
  - Density: 44.2/km^{2} (114/sq mi)
- Time zone: UTC−5 (EST)

El Pedregoso is a corregimiento in Pesé District, Herrera Province, Panama with a population of 1,386 as of 2010. Its population as of 1990 was 1,214; its population as of 2000 was 1,311.
