= Herrera Province =

Province of Panama

Coordinates: 7°50′N 80°40′W

Herrera Province Provincia de Herrera
- Province
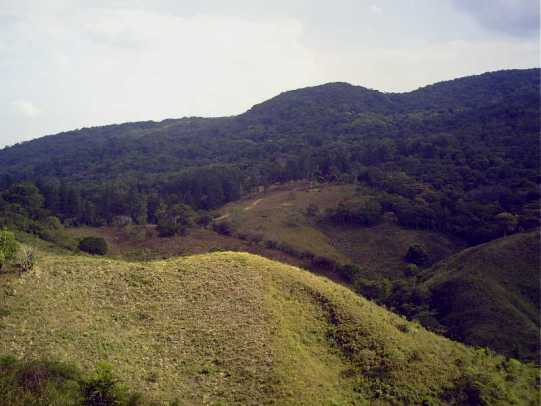

- Flag

- Location of Herrera Province in Panama
- Country: Panama
- Founded: 1915
- Capital: Chitré

Area
  - Total: 2,362 km^{2} (912 sq mi)

Population (2023 census)
  - Total: 122,071
  - Density: 51.68/km^{2} (133.9/sq mi)

GDP (PPP, constant 2015 values)
  - Year: 2023
  - Total: $3.0 billion
  - Per capita: $26,900
- Time zone: UTC-5 (Eastern Time)
- ISO 3166 code: PA-6
- HDI (2017): 0.787 high

Herrera (Spanish pronunciation: [eˈreɾa]) is a province in Panama. Named after General Tomás Herrera, the province was founded on January 18, 1915 from a division of the Los Santos province. The capital city of Herrera is Chitré, which is located near the province's coastline. Herrera is bordered on the north by the provinces of Veraguas and Coclé, on the south by the province of Los Santos, on the east by Golfo de Parita and the province of Los Santos, and on the west by the province of Veraguas.

== History ==
After gaining independence from Spain in 1821, the isthmus of Panama was divided into two provinces, Panamá and Veraguas. The province Panamá consisted of the districts of Natá, Portobelo, Panama and Darién. At the time, the location now occupied by the city of Chitré was inhabited by a small population of indigenous persons, near La Villa de Los Santos and was governed from Natá. It later came under the control of the Los Santos government. The province of Herrera was created in 1854 and eliminated in 1860. 55 years later, in 1915 the province was created again by the president of Panama Dr. Belisario Porras.

Chitré was founded on October 19, 1848 by Ventura Solís, Matías Rodríguez, José Ríos, José María Benavidez, Ildelfonso Pérez, Blas Tello, Eugenio Barrera, José Burgos y Carlos Rodríguez. Chitré, however, was included in the province of Los Santos. It was not until 1915 under the Porras administration that Chitré became a part of Herrera and was made the province's capital.

In the 9th of October, 2026 a powerful magnitude 7.7 strike-slip earthquake rattled the region, causing widespread panic across the entire country. The earthquake was the 1st strongest earthquake ever instrumentally recorded in Panama and the 3rd in 2026

== Economy ==
Of Panama's nine provinces, Herrera ranks third in sugarcane production. Other commercial mainstays in Herrera include retail, equipment repair, banking, and domestic service. Prominent industries include dairy, cattle, commercial fishing, alcohol, ceramics, clay products, mosaics, and cement.

== Culture ==
The famous Festival del Manito Ocueño has its origin in the city of Ocú in Herrera. Also, the pottery work in the province is extensive, consisting mainly of high-quality reproductions of pre-Columbian artifacts. Herrera's pottery is the best-known in the country. Panama's most famous alcoholic drink, "seco" (translation: dry), is produced in Herrera, which is a sugarcane liqueur said to be drier than normal rum. Varela Hermanos, a company based in Pesé, sells seco under the trade name Seco Herrerano.

== Sports ==
Herrera's baseball team has won sixteen national championships, more than any other team in the country, including the 2005, 2006 and 2007 titles.

== Carnival ==
The best-known carnivals are celebrated in Chitré, Parita and Ocú. Chitré's carnival is one of the most popular in Panama, but those in Ocú have risen in prominence in recent years.

== Administrative divisions ==
Herrera Province is divided into 7 distritos (districts) and subdivided into 49 corregimientos.

Distrito	Area (km^{2})	Population Estimate 2010	Population Census 2023
Chitré	88	53,696	60,957
Las Minas	469	7,990	6,642
Los Pozos	385	7,913	6,928
Ocú	618	16,436	16,116
Parita	353	9,404	9,695
Pesé	289	13,119	13,009
Santa María	160	7,853	8,724

District	Corregimientos (Subdivisions)	Cabecera (Seat)
Chitré District	Chitré, La Arena, Monagrillo, Llano Bonito, San Juan Bautista	Chitré
Las Minas District	Las Minas, Chepo, Chumical, El Toro, Leones, Quebrada del Rosario, Quebrada El Ciprián	Las Minas
Los Pozos District	Los Pozos, El Capurí, El Calabacito, El Cedro, La Arena, La Pitaloza, Los Cerritos, Los Cerros de Paja, Las Llanas	Los Pozos
Ocú District	San Sebastián de Ocú, Cerro Largo, Los Llanos, Llano Grande, Peñas Chatas, El Tijera, Menchaca, Entradero del Castillo	San Sebastián de Ocú
Parita District	Parita, Cabuya, Los Castillos, Llano de la Cruz, París, Portobelillo, Potuga	Parita
Pesé District	Pesé, Las Cabras, El Pájaro, El Barrero, El Pedregoso, El Ciruelo, Sabanagrande, Rincón Hondo	Pesé
Santa María District	Santa María, Chupampa, El Rincón, El Limón, Los Canelos	Santa María
