= List of earthquakes in 2026 =

Earthquakes in 2026
Approximate epicenters of notable earthquakes in 2026
- 4.0–5.9 magnitude
- 6.0–6.9 magnitude
- 7.0–7.9 magnitude
- 8.0+ magnitude
- Strongest: M_{w} 7.8 Philippines; M_{w} 7.8 Indonesia
- Deadliest: M_{w} 7.5 Venezuela; 6,509 deaths
- Total fatalities: 7,201

Number by magnitude
- 9.0+: 0
- 8.0–8.9: 0
- 7.0–7.9: 13
- 6.0–6.9: 117
- 5.0–5.9: 1,594
- 4.0–4.9: 11,789

This is a list of earthquakes in 2026. Only earthquakes of magnitude 6 or above are included, unless they result in significant damage and/or casualties. All dates are listed according to UTC time. The maximum intensities are based on the Modified Mercalli intensity scale. Earthquake magnitudes are based on data from the United States Geological Survey (USGS).

== Compared to other years ==
Number of earthquakes worldwide for 2016–2026 []
Magnitude	2016	2017	2018	2019	2020	2021	2022	2023	2024	2025	2026
8.0–9.9	0	1	1	1	0	3	0	0	0	1	0
7.0–7.9	16	6	16	9	9	16	11	19	10	15	13
6.0–6.9	131	104	117	135	112	138	116	128	89	129	109
5.0–5.9	1,561	1,456	1,688	1,500	1,329	2,070	1,599	1,633	1,408	1,984	1,594
4.0–4.9	13,700	11,541	12,785	11,899	12,513	15,069	14,022	14,450	12,668	16,023	11,789
Total	15,411	13,113	14,614	13,555	13,967	17,297	15,749	16,231	14,176	18,152	13,505

Map of earthquakes in 2026 - M 5.0 or greater (map data)

== By death toll ==
Rank	Death toll	Mag.	Location	MMI	Depth (km)	Date	Event
1	6,509	7.5	Venezuela, La Guaira offshore	IX (Violent)	10.0	June 24	2026 Venezuela earthquakes
1	6,509	7.2	Venezuela, Yaracuy	IX (Violent)	10.0	June 24	2026 Venezuela earthquakes
2	335	7.4	Colombia, Chocó	VIII (Severe)	110.3	August 10	2026 Colombia earthquake
3	142	7.8	Indonesia, East Nusa Tenggara offshore	VIII (Severe)	10.0	August 14	2026 Flores earthquake
4	107	7.8	Philippines, Soccsksargen offshore	IX (Violent)	57.0	June 7	2026 Mindanao earthquake
5	38	6.8	Japan, Kumamoto	IX (Violent)	8.0	July 28	2026 Kumamoto earthquake
7	16	7.0	China, Tibet Autonomous Region	IX (Violent)	18.0	October 22	2026 Tibet earthquake
8	12	5.8	Afghanistan, Badakhshan	III (Weak)	186.4	April 3	2026 Jurm earthquake

Listed are earthquakes with at least 10 reported fatalities.

== By magnitude ==
Rank	Mag.	Death toll	Location	MMI	Depth (km)	Date	Event
1	7.8	107	Philippines, Soccsksargen offshore	IX (Violent)	57.0	June 7	2026 Mindanao earthquake
1	7.8	142	Indonesia, East Nusa Tenggara offshore	VIII (Severe)	10.0	August 14	2026 Flores earthquake
3	7.7	3	Panama, Herrera	IX (Violent)	12.6	October 9	2026 Panama earthquake
4	7.5	6,509 (Note: A combined death toll is given for the 2026 Venezuela earthquakes.)	Venezuela, La Guaira offshore	IX (Violent)	10.0	June 24	2026 Venezuela earthquakes
4	7.5	–	Tonga, Vava'u offshore	V (Moderate)	229.5	March 24	–
6	7.4	335	Colombia, Chocó	VIII (Severe)	110.3	August 10	2026 Colombia earthquake
6	7.4	1	Indonesia, North Maluku offshore	VIII (Severe)	35.0	April 1	2026 North Maluku earthquake
6	7.4	–	Japan, Iwate offshore	VI (Strong)	25.0	April 20	2026 Sanriku earthquake
9	7.3	–	Mexico, Chiapas offshore	VII (Very strong)	15.3	July 17	–
9	7.3	–	Vanuatu, Sanma offshore	VII (Very strong)	121.3	March 30	–
11	7.2	–	Venezuela, Yaracuy	IX (Violent)	10.0	June 24	2026 Venezuela earthquakes
12	7.1	–	Malaysia, Sabah offshore	V (Moderate)	629.0	February 22	–
13	7.0	16	China, Tibet Autonomous Region	IX (Violent)	18.0	October 22	2026 Tibet earthquake

Listed are earthquakes with at least 7.0 magnitude.

== By month ==
=== January ===
January
- Strongest: M_{w} 6.5 Mexico
- Deadliest: M_{w} 6.5 Mexico; 2 deaths M_{w} 5.6 Pakistan; 2 deaths
- Total fatalities: 4

Number by magnitude
- 9.0+: 0
- 8.0–8.9: 0
- 7.0–7.9: 0
- 6.0–6.9: 10
- 5.0–5.9: 169
- 4.0–4.9: 1,067

Date	Country and location	M	Depth (km)	MMI	Notes	Casualties	
Date	Country and location	M	Depth (km)	MMI	Notes	Dead	Injured
1	Southeast Indian Ridge	6.0	10.0	-	-	-	-
2	Mexico, Guerrero, 4 km (2.5 mi) NNW of Rancho Viejo	6.5	18.0	VII	Further information: 2026 Guerrero earthquake	2	24
4	India, Assam, 13 km (8.1 mi) SW of Dhing	5.2	35.0	V	Three people injured in Morigaon and several homes damaged in the Morigaon-Nagaon area.	-	3
6	Japan, Shimane, 18 km (11 mi) S of Matsue	5.7	10.0	VII	Fifteen people injured and 114 homes damaged in Hyōgo, Tottori, Shimane, Okayama and Hiroshima prefectures. Ceiling panels in Yonago City Hall fell, fences and walls collapsed in Hōki, the wall of a building collapsed in Matsue, one house damaged in Tamano and a fire station cracked in Okayama.	-	15
7	Philippines, Davao offshore, 16 km (9.9 mi) E of Baculin	6.4	22.0	VI	Aftershock of the 2025 Davao Oriental earthquakes. A chapel partially collapsed in Caraga.	-	-
10	Indonesia, North Sulawesi offshore, 245 km (152 mi) NNW of Tobelo	6.4	31.0	VII	At least 14 structures damaged in Talaud Islands Regency.	-	-
13	Russia, Sakhalin offshore, 133 km (83 mi) SE of Kurilsk	6.2	35.8	V	-	-	-
16	United States, Oregon offshore, 295 km (183 mi) W of Bandon	6.0	10.0	IV	-	-	-
17	Honduras, Cortés offshore, 12 km (7.5 mi) N of Cuyamel	5.2	6.9	V	At least 50 homes damaged in the Omoa area.	-	-
17	Mexico, Guerrero, 7 km (4.3 mi) ESE of Barrio Nuevo de los Muertos	4.9	10.0	V	Aftershock of the 2026 Guerrero earthquake. Additional damage to homes in the San Marcos area.	-	-
19	Pakistan, Gilgit-Baltistan, 47 km (29 mi) NNW of Barishal	5.6	23.0	VI	Two people killed, five others injured, 300 homes destroyed, 300 others and many buildings damaged in the Chipursan area.	2	5
19	China, Yunnan, 38 km (24 mi) SW of Zhaotong	5.2	10.0	IV	About 1,540 homes damaged and landslides and rockfalls occurred in Qiaojia County.	-	-
19	New Caledonia, Loyalty Islands offshore, 260 km (160 mi) ESE of Tadine	6.0	10.0	-	-	-	-
21	Poland, Lower Silesian Voivodeship, 4 km (2.5 mi) WNW of Lubin	3.5	1.0	-	Two people injured at the Lubin mine.	-	2
21	Japan, Volcano Islands offshore	6.1	25.5	III	-	-	-
22	Russia, Kamchatka offshore, 128 km (80 mi) S of Vilyuchinsk	6.2	52.2	V	Aftershock of the 2025 Kamchatka earthquake.	-	-
23	Indonesia, West Kalimantan, 156 km (97 mi) SSE of Simanggang, Malaysia	4.8	10.0	IV	Some walls collapsed, several homes and a bridge damaged in Sintang Regency.	-	-
23	Turkey, Balıkesir, 10 km (6.2 mi) ESE of Sındırgı	4.9	8.9	IV	Aftershock of the 2025 Balıkesir earthquakes. One home damaged in Sındırgı.	-	-
24	Madagascar, Itasy, 11 km (6.8 mi) SW of Soavinandriana	4.9	10.0	IV	One person injured and two structures collapsed in the epicentral area.	-	1
26	China, Gansu, 9 km (5.6 mi) ESE of Dianga	5.5	10.0	VII	One home collapsed, several others damaged and landslides occurred in Têwo County.	-	-
27	Indonesia, East Java, 19 km (12 mi) SSW of Ponorogo	5.7	127.0	IV	Three people injured and one office building damaged in Trenggalek Regency. Six homes damaged in Malang, Pacitan, and Ponorogo regencies. One school damaged in Tulungagung Regency.	-	3
27	Indonesia, Yogyakarta, 5 km (3.1 mi) SE of Pundong	4.6	10.0	III	Two people injured, 18 homes and one school damaged in Klaten Regency. At least 12 buildings damaged in Gunung Kidul and Bantul regencies.	-	2
29	South Sandwich Islands region	6.0	68.1	IV	-	-	-

=== February ===
February
- Strongest: M_{w} 7.1 Malaysia
- Deadliest: M_{w} 5.8 Indonesia; 1 death
- Total fatalities: 1

Number by magnitude
- 9.0+: 0
- 8.0–8.9: 0
- 7.0–7.9: 1
- 6.0–6.9: 7
- 5.0–5.9: 105
- 4.0–4.9: 966

Date	Country and location	M	Depth (km)	MMI	Notes	Casualties	
Date	Country and location	M	Depth (km)	MMI	Notes	Dead	Injured
1	Iran, Bushehr offshore, 27 km (17 mi) WSW of Mohr	5.2	10.0	V	Some walls collapsed, windows shattered and damage to several transformers and electricity poles in Asaluyeh.	-	-
1	Indonesia, Bali, 8 km (5.0 mi) E of Amlapura	3.5	12.0	-	At least two homes seriously damaged in Karangasem Regency.	-	-
2	India, Jammu and Kashmir, 16 km (9.9 mi) WNW of Tsrār Sharīf	4.8	10.0	III	Many homes damaged in the Uri area.	-	-
4	New Zealand, Kermadec Islands offshore	6.1	184.2	IV	-	-	-
5	Indonesia, East Java offshore, 94 km (58 mi) SW of Trenggalek	5.8	40.0	IV	One person killed in Pacitan, five homes destroyed and 57 structures damaged in East Java. Forty-seven people injured and 22 buildings damaged in Yogyakarta. One home destroyed in Kebumen Regency and five structures damaged in Central Java.	1	47
6	Turkey, Erzincan, 19 km (12 mi) S of Refahiye	4.7	10.0	-	Landslides and rockfalls occurred in the epicentral area and Kemah District.	-	-
8	Chile, Tarapacá, 76 km (47 mi) ENE of La Tirana	5.7	119.0	V	One church severely damaged in Huara.	-	-
10	Fiji region offshore	6.2	510.9	III	-	-	-
12	Chile, Coquimbo, 32 km (20 mi) SW of Ovalle	6.2	36.9	VI	One house damaged in Punitaqui. Rockfalls occurred in the Agua Negra Pass.	-	-
12	Afghanistan, Balkh, 23 km (14 mi) SW of Khulm	4.5	10.0	IV	Three people injured in Mazar-i-Sharif.	-	3
13	Iran, Bushehr offshore, 34 km (21 mi) WSW of Mohr	4.9	10.0	V	Many homes damaged, some of them severely in the Asaluyeh area.	-	-
14	Vanuatu, Sanma, 48 km (30 mi) of W of Port Olry	6.4	43.0	VI	-	-	-
16	Russia, Kamchatka offshore, 86 km (53 mi) ESE of Ozernovskiy	6.0	43.0	V	Aftershock of the 2025 Kamchatka earthquake.	-	-
20	Afghanistan, Panjshir, 38 km (24 mi) NE of Bazarak	5.8	90.7	IV	One person injured and three homes damaged in Takhar and Laghman provinces.	-	1
21	Slovakia, Trnava, 10 km (6.2 mi) ESE of Šamorín	4.1	10.0	V	A chimney collapsed in Bratislava and several homes and buildings damaged in the Šamorín-Galanta-Dunajská Streda area.	-	-
22	South of the Fiji Islands	6.0	653.8	II	-	-	-
22	Malaysia, Sabah offshore, 57 km (35 mi) NNW of Kota Belud	7.1	629.0	V	Strongest earthquake ever recorded in Malaysia.	-	-
23	United States, Alaska offshore, 93 km (58 mi) SW of Nikolski	6.1	14.0	V	-	-	-
25	Tajikistan, Gorno-Badakhshan, 33 km (21 mi) N of Ishqoshim	5.4	121.3	IV	Two people injured by a landslide in Fayzabad, Afghanistan.	-	2
27	Bangladesh, Khulna, 24 km (15 mi) SSE of Satkhira	5.0	36.8	VII	Three people injured and many homes, schools and mosques damaged in Satkhira District. Some buildings and a road damaged in Kolkata, India.	-	3
27	Azerbaijan, Shamakhi, 16 km (9.9 mi) NNW of Shamakhi	4.8	10.0	-	Dozens of homes and buildings damaged or destroyed in the Agsu-Shamakhi area.	-	-

=== March ===
March
- Strongest: M_{w} 7.5 Tonga
- Total fatalities: 0

Number by magnitude
- 9.0+: 0
- 8.0–8.9: 0
- 7.0–7.9: 2
- 6.0–6.9: 15
- 5.0–5.9: 142
- 4.0–4.9: 1,207

Date	Country and location	M	Depth (km)	MMI	Notes	Casualties	
Date	Country and location	M	Depth (km)	MMI	Notes	Dead	Injured
1	Fiji region offshore	6.3	596.3	III	-	-	-
2	Japan, Volcano Islands offshore	6.0	20.0	-	-	-	-
3	Indonesia, Aceh offshore, 62 km (39 mi) SE of Sinabang	6.2	18.0	VI	-	-	-
4	Italy, Sicily offshore, 12 km (7.5 mi) ESE of Letojanni	4.5	10.0	V	Walls and roofs collapsed and at least 600 homes damaged in the Ragalna area.	-	-
4	United States, Alaska offshore, 224 km (139 mi) ESE of Attu Station	6.4	10.0	VI	-	-	-
6	Solomon Islands, Makira-Ulawa offshore, 170 km (110 mi) SE of Kirakira	6.2	10.0	IV	-	-	-
8	Tonga, Niua offshore, 7 km (4.3 mi) WSW of Hihifo	6.0	134.0	IV	-	-	-
8	Greece, Epirus, 2 km (1.2 mi) SSE of Rodotopi	5.5	10.0	VII	At least 140 homes damaged or destroyed, landslides occurred and power outages in the Dodoni-Ioannina-Seniko area.	-	-
9	Turkey, Denizli, 13 km (8.1 mi) W of Gözler	5.0	10.0	V	Some old houses and buildings collapsed or damaged in Buldan.	-	-
9	Italy, Campania offshore, 12 km (7.5 mi) W of Anacapri	6.0	381.7	III	-	-	-
12	Greece, Thessaly, 14 km (8.7 mi) SW of Morfovoúni	4.6	19.0	VII	Several buildings including a church damaged, landslides occurred and power outages in the Karditsa-Evrytania area.	-	-
13	Turkey, Tokat, 15 km (9.3 mi) WNW of Niksar	5.3	10.0	VII	Some people injured or hospitalized and minor damage in the Tokat area.	-	Some
13	Chile, Atacama offshore, 71 km (44 mi) W of Vallenar	6.2	24.0	VI	One school damaged in Freirina.	-	-
14	Netherlands, Drenthe, 4 km (2.5 mi) SSE of Assen	2.9	3.0	-	More than 630 buildings damaged in the Assen area.	-	-
14	Indonesia, West Java, 9 km (5.6 mi) SE of Sukabumi	4.1	10.0	-	At least two homes collapsed and several buildings damaged in Sukabumi Regency. One home damaged in Cianjur Regency.	-	-
17	Cuba, Guantanamo offshore, 49 km (30 mi) SSw of Maisí	5.8	11.6	V	Facades collapsed and several homes damaged in Santiago de Cuba.	-	-
17	Russia, Magadan, 32 km (20 mi) NNE of Ola	4.9	10.0	IV	Some buildings damaged, and power and water outages occurred in the Magadan area.	-	-
18	Guatemala, Izabal, 15 km (9.3 mi) NNE of Los Amates	5.0	10.0	IV	The wall of a home collapsed in the Los Amates area.	-	-
20	Antarctica, South Shetland Islands offshore	6.5	21.0	V	-	-	-
20	Vanuatu, Tafea offshore, 100 km (62 mi) WNW of Isangel	6.1	10.0	IV	-	-	-
21	Northern Mid-Atlantic Ridge	6.6	10.0	-	-	-	-
22	Tonga, Niua offshore, 102 km (63 mi) NE of Hihifo	6.2	10.0	IV	Triplet earthquake.	-	-
22	Samoa, Tuamasaga offshore, 149 km (93 mi) SSW of Lotofagā	6.2	10.0	IV	Triplet earthquake.	-	-
22	Tonga, Niua offshore, 144 km (89 mi) NE of Hihifo	6.3	10.0	IV	Triplet earthquake.	-	-
24	Tonga, Vava‘u offshore, 166 km (103 mi) W of Neiafu	7.5	229.5	V	-	-	-
25	Italy, Tuscany, 15 km (9.3 mi) NW of Massa	4.0	11.0	-	One structure partially collapsed and several buildings damaged in the La Spezia area.	-	-
25	Greece, Mount Athos, 10 km (6.2 mi) E of Ouranoupolis	4.9	10.0	III	Some buildings damaged in the Mount Athos area.	-	-
26	Japan, Iwate offshore, 122 km (76 mi) E of Yamada	6.5	9.5	IV	-	-	-
26	Pakistan, Gilgit-Baltistan, 33 km (21 mi) NW of Barishal	5.3	10.0	IV	Part of an earthquake swarm. Several houses damaged and landslides in the Chapursan-Gojal area.	-	-
30	Vanuatu, Penama offshore, 48 km (30 mi) ENE of Luganville	7.3	121.3	VII	Several people injured, several buildings and an airport runway damaged, rockfalls and power and water outages in the Luganville-Malakula area.	-	Several

=== April ===
April
- Strongest: M_{w} 7.4 Indonesia; M_{w} 7.4 Japan
- Deadliest: M_{w} 5.8 Afghanistan; 12 deaths
- Total fatalities: 13

Number by magnitude
- 9.0+: 0
- 8.0–8.9: 0
- 7.0–7.9: 2
- 6.0–6.9: 6
- 5.0–5.9: 161
- 4.0–4.9: 1,353

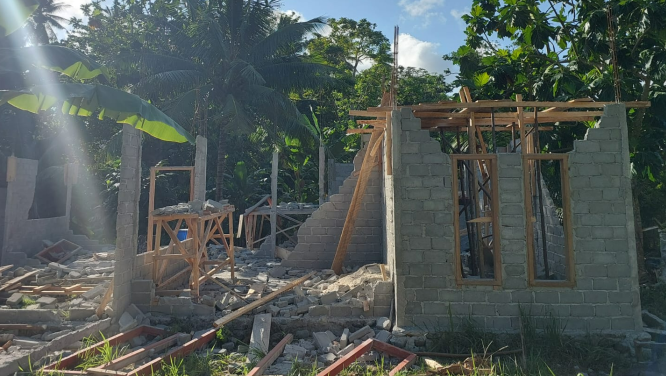
House damage in Batang Dua Islands, Indonesia

Date	Country and location	M	Depth (km)	MMI	Notes	Casualties	
Date	Country and location	M	Depth (km)	MMI	Notes	Dead	Injured
1	Peru, San Martín, 27 km (17 mi) ESE of Picota	6.0	108.8	V	-	-	-
1	Indonesia, North Maluku offshore, 126 km (78 mi) WNW of Ternate	7.4	35.0	VIII	Further information: 2026 North Maluku earthquake	1	4
2	Indonesia, North Maluku offshore, 109 km (68 mi) WNW of Ternate	6.3	28.0	V	Aftershock of the 2026 North Maluku earthquake.	-	-
3	Tajikistan, Districts under Central Government Jurisdiction, 50 km (31 mi) ESE of Rasht	5.2	10.0	VII	One building destroyed and 22 homes damaged in Tojikobod District.	-	-
3	Afghanistan, Badakhshan, 35 km (22 mi) S of Jurm	5.8	186.4	III	Further information: 2026 Jurm earthquake	12	6
4	Turkey, Van, 22 km (14 mi) SSE of Erciş	5.1	10.0	V	One person injured and one barn collapsed in the Erciş-Tuşba area.	-	1
4	Philippines, Davao offshore, 90 km (56 mi) SE of Sarangani	6.0	99.6	IV	-	-	-
6	Philippines, Central Visayas, 0 km (0 mi) S of Tabonok	5.2	10.0	VI	Aftershock of the 2025 Cebu earthquake. At least seven people injured, several buildings damaged and power outages in the Bogo area. Several buildings previously affected by the 2025 quake sustained further damage in San Remigio.	-	7
8	Indonesia, East Nusa Tenggara offshore, 103 km (64 mi) E of Maumere	4.8	10.0	IV	Eighteen people injured and 367 buildings damaged in East Flores Regency.	-	18
9	Poland, Silesia, 8 km (5.0 mi) SW of Rybnik	2.7	1.0	-	Three people injured in a mine near Rydułtowy.	-	3
9	India, Gujarat, 13 km (8.1 mi) W of Katpur	3.7	15.0	-	Some homes damaged in Amreli district.	-	-
11	India, Maharashtra, 13 km (8.1 mi) NNE of Basmat	4.5	10.0	V	Many homes and buildings damaged in the Hingoli-Nanded-Parbhani area.	-	-
16	New Zealand, south of the Kermadec Islands	6.0	10.0	VI	-	-	-
18	Japan, Nagano, 5 km (3.1 mi) NNW of Ōmachi	4.9	10.0	V	At least 104 homes damaged in the epicentral area.	-	-
18	Japan, Nagano, 5 km (3.1 mi) NE of Ōmachi	4.9	10.0	IV	At least 104 homes damaged in the epicentral area.	-	-
19	Tonga, Niua offshore, 93 km (58 mi) NNE of Hihifo	6.1	36.0	IV	-	-	-
20	Japan, Iwate offshore, 100 km (62 mi) ENE of Miyako	7.4	35.0	VI	Further information: 2026 Sanriku earthquake	-	10
20	Japan, Iwate offshore, 100 km (62 mi) E of Miyako	6.0	35.0	IV	Aftershock of the 2026 Sanriku earthquake.	-	-
22	United States, Nevada, 19 km (12 mi) SE of Silver Springs	4.8	3.0	VIII	Some buildings damaged in the Fort Churchill-Fallon area.	-	-
22	Turkey, Ağrı, 21 km (13 mi) NNE of Adilcevaz	4.3	2.3	-	The wall of a house collapsed and several homes damaged in two villages in Patnos District.	-	-
22	Indonesia, Bali, 15 km (9.3 mi) S of Singaraja	3.5	9.0	-	One home severely damaged in Buleleng Regency.	-	-
26	Japan, Hokkaido, 22 km (14 mi) W of Sarabetsu	5.9	81.0	V	One person injured in Hakodate and damage to a museum in Urahoro.	-	1
29	Argentina, Salta, 31 km (19 mi) SE of Tartagal	4.1	10.0	-	Several homes damaged in the Tartagal area.	-	-

=== May ===
May
- Strongest: M_{w} 6.9 Chile
- Deadliest: M_{w} 5.0 China; 2 deaths
- Total fatalities: 3

Number by magnitude
- 9.0+: 0
- 8.0–8.9: 0
- 7.0–7.9: 0
- 6.0–6.9: 11
- 5.0–5.9: 107
- 4.0–4.9: 1,073

Date	Country and location	M	Depth (km)	MMI	Notes	Casualties	
Date	Country and location	M	Depth (km)	MMI	Notes	Dead	Injured
4	Philippines, Eastern Visayas, 5 km (3.1 mi) WNW of Nena	6.0	43.0	VI	Two people injured in Dolores and San Julian. One home destroyed, 75 others damaged and power outages in the San Julian area. Three homes destroyed and 11 damaged in Taft. Several homes and a crucifix at a church damaged in Catbalogan, Dolores, Jiabong, and Oras. Water services disrupted in Maydolong.	-	2
9	United States, Alaska offshore, 304 km (189 mi) WSW of Adak	6.1	16.3	V	-	-	-
10	Laos, Xiangkhouang, 52 km (32 mi) NNE of Muang Phônsavan	3.8	10.0	-	Many homes damaged in Sơn La, Vietnam.	-	-
14	Colombia, Chocó offshore, 32 km (20 mi) WNW of Darien	5.3	117.1	IV	At least two homes and several schools damaged in the Anserma-Supía area.	-	-
14	Indonesia, Maluku offshore, 271 km (168 mi) WSW of Tual	6.2	146.1	IV	-	-	-
15	Japan, Iwate offshore, 49 km (30 mi) ESE of Ōfunato	6.7	43.6	VI	Power outages caused disruptions on the Tōhoku Shinkansen.	-	-
16	Antigua and Barbuda, Barbuda offshore, 70 km (43 mi) ESE of Codrington	6.0	30.0	V	-	-	-
17	China, Guangxi, 24 km (15 mi) NW of Liuzhou	5.0	10.0	VI	Further information: 2026 Liuzhou earthquakes	2	5
18	China, Guangxi, 26 km (16 mi) NW of Liuzhou	5.1	10.0	VII	Further information: 2026 Liuzhou earthquakes	-	1
19	Peru, Ica, 20 km (12 mi) ESE of Pampa de Tate	5.8	56.5	V	Twenty-eight people injured, two homes destroyed, 128 homes, 50 buildings, 610 m (2,000 ft) of road, 450 m (1,480 ft) of irrigation canals, a reservoir and a wastewater treatment plant damaged in Ica, Huancavelica, and Ayacucho departments. Landslides blocked roads in Huancano District and Huaytará.	-	28
20	Japan, Kagoshima offshore, 8 km (5.0 mi) E of Wadomari	5.9	42.0	V	One person injured in Tokunoshima. The ceiling of a gymnasium partially collapsed and several buildings including a school damaged in the Yoron area.	-	1
20	Turkey, Malatya, 20 km (12 mi) NNW of Sincik	5.4	10.0	VII	At least 85 people injured or hospitalized, three barns and a retaining wall collapsed and one home damaged in Malatya Province. Rockfalls occurred in Pütürge.	-	85
20	Southern East Pacific Rise	6.6	10.0	-	-	-	-
21	Italy, Campania offshore, 1 km (0.62 mi) SSW of Bacoli	4.1	7.4	V	The archway at the Baia lookout point collapsed and many homes damaged in the Bacoli area.	-	-
23	United States, Hawaii, 13 km (8.1 mi) S of Honaunau-Napoopoo	6.0	22.6	VIII	Seven homes destroyed, at least 300 structures, including a hospital damaged, power outages occurred and water lines broken in Hawaiʻi County. Landslides blocked Highway 11 between Captain Cook and Ocean View.	-	-
24	Turkey, Adana, 22 km (14 mi) SSE of Saimbeyli	4.9	10.0	II	One building collapsed in the Seyhan area.	-	-
25	Chile, Antofagasta, 29 km (18 mi) ENE of Calama	6.9	109.0	VI	At least 16 homes and seven schools damaged, landslides blocked roads, and power and water outages occurred in the Calama area.	-	-
26	Indonesia, East Java offshore, 66 km (41 mi) SW of Gambiran Satu	4.9	35.0	III	Three people injured after a house collapsed in Banyuwangi Regency.	-	3
26	Pakistan, Punjab, 13 km (8.1 mi) NNE of Malakwal City	4.6	13.4	V	One person killed, 11 others injured and 10 homes collapsed in Jhelum District.	1	11
27	Western Indian-Antarctic Ridge	6.0	10.0	-	Doublet earthquake.	-	-
27	Western Indian-Antarctic Ridge	6.0	10.0	-	Doublet earthquake.	-	-
31	Chile, Valparaíso offshore, 36 km (22 mi) NW of Valparaíso	6.0	25.0	V	-	-	-

=== June ===
June
- Strongest: M_{w} 7.8 Philippines
- Deadliest: M_{w} 7.5 Venezuela; 6,509 deaths
- Total fatalities: 6,621

Number by magnitude
- 9.0+: 0
- 8.0–8.9: 0
- 7.0–7.9: 3
- 6.0–6.9: 16
- 5.0–5.9: 161
- 4.0–4.9: 1,308

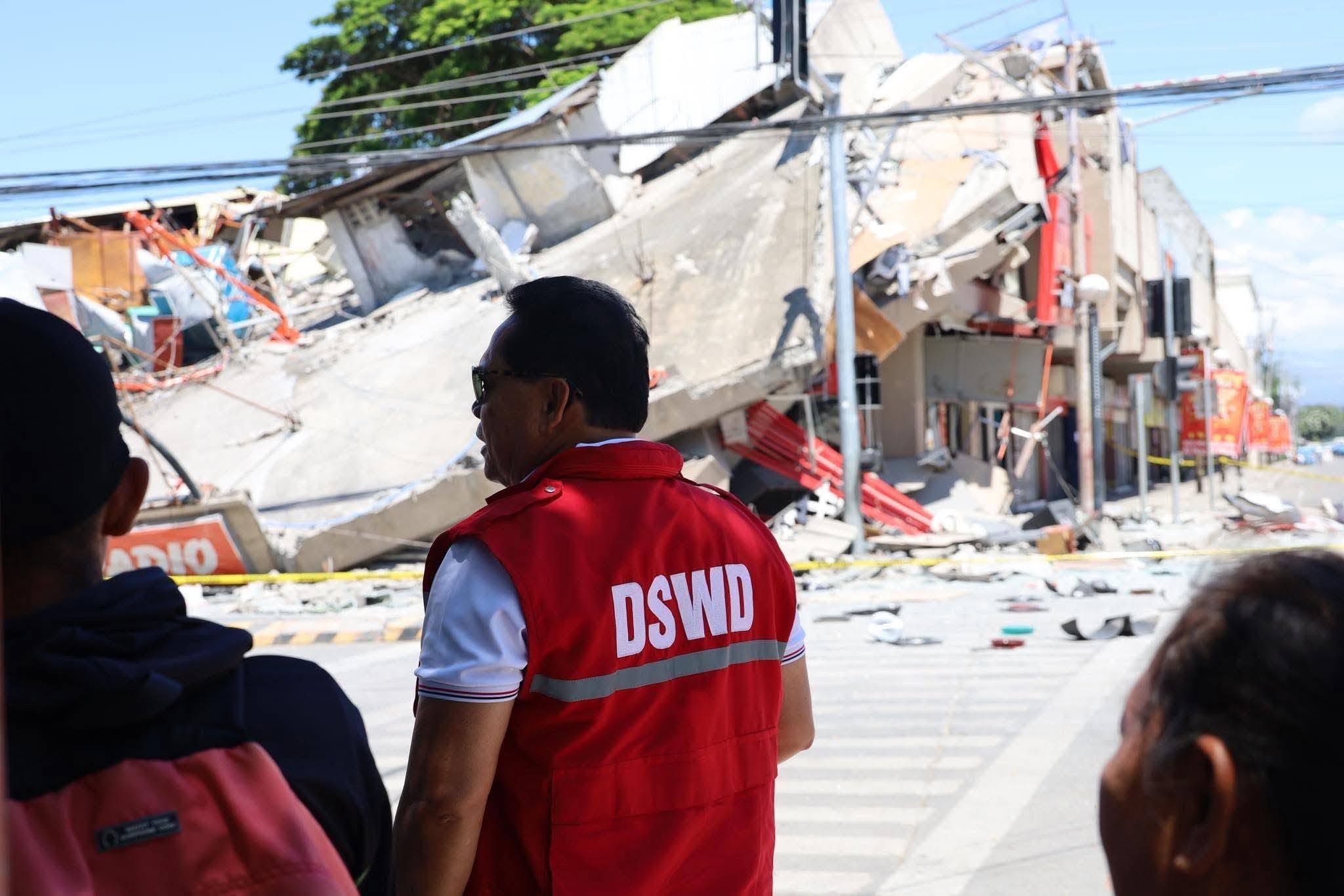
A collapsed building in General Santos, Philippines

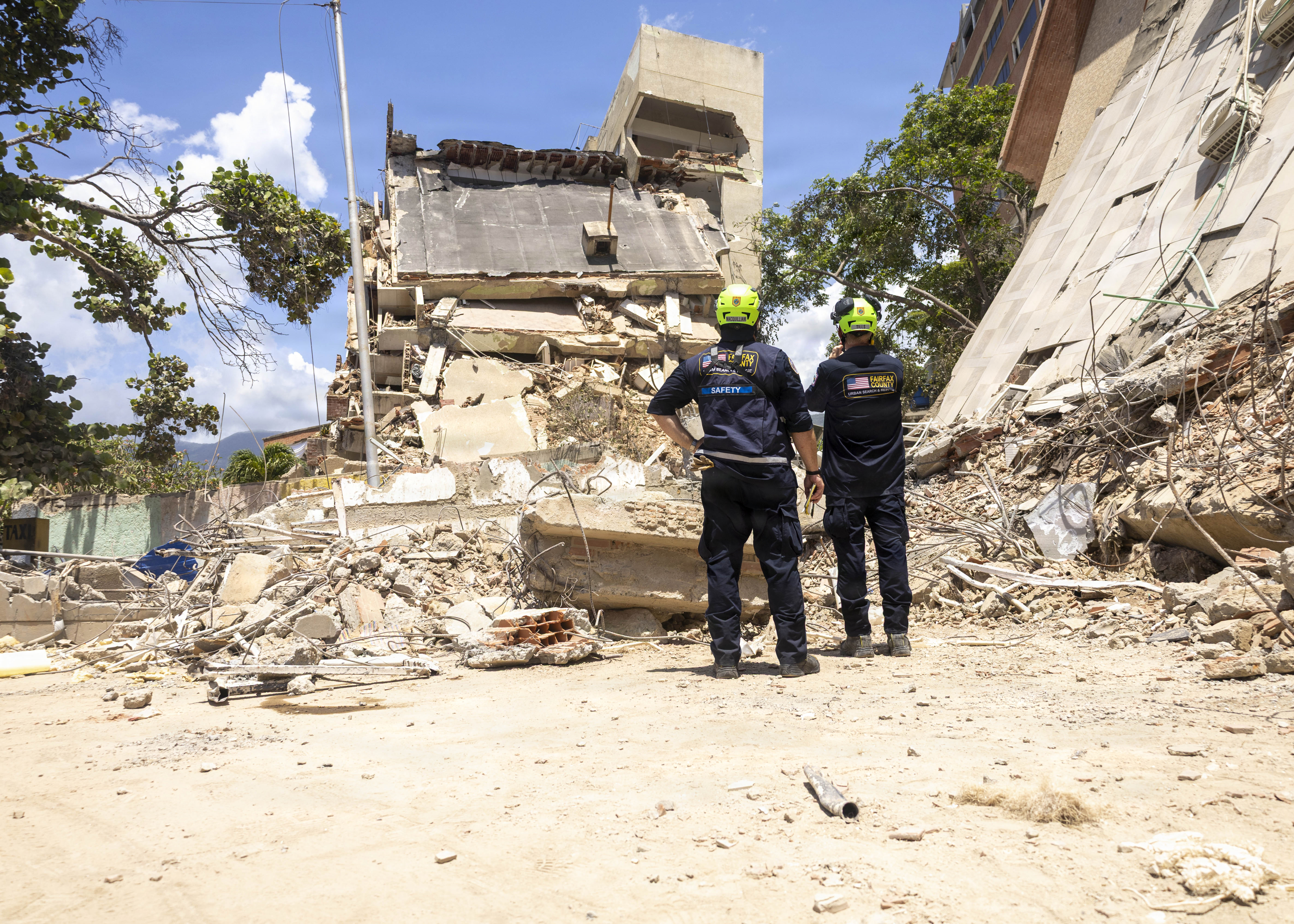
Aftermath of the quake in La Guaira, Venezuela

Date	Country and location	M	Depth (km)	MMI	Notes	Casualties	
Date	Country and location	M	Depth (km)	MMI	Notes	Dead	Injured
1	Italy, Calabria offshore, 23 km (14 mi) WSW of San Lucido	6.2	243.0	IV	-	-	-
5	Philippines, Bicol offshore, 1 km (0.62 mi) ESE of San Roque	5.2	10.0	VI	At least 96 structures damaged and rockslides occurred in the Bacacay-Guinobatan-Legazpi-Santo Domingo area.	-	-
5	India, Himachal Pradesh, 37 km (23 mi) WSW of Kyelang	4.9	22.5	V	Many homes and a hospital damaged in Kangra district.	-	-
6	Timor-Leste, Baucau, 22 km (14 mi) E of Venilale	5.2	10.0	V	Two homes severely damaged and landslides occurred in Viqueque Municipality.	-	-
7	Greece, Central Greece, 5 km (3.1 mi) ENE of Límni	4.9	10.0	IV	One house collapsed, 96 structures including a church damaged and landslides in the Prokopi-Dafnousa area.	-	-
7	Greece, Central Greece, 7 km (4.3 mi) W of Prokopi	5.2	10.0	VI	One house collapsed, 96 structures including a church damaged and landslides in the Prokopi-Dafnousa area.	-	-
7	Russia, Sakhalin offshore, 111 km (69 mi) SE of Severo-Kurilsk	6.0	18.0	IV	-	-	-
7	Bhutan, Punakha, 15 km (9.3 mi) WNW of Punakha	5.6	10.0	VII	One person injured in Lhuntse. At least 404 structures damaged across Bhutan, mostly in the Mongar-Punakha-Wangdue Phodrang area. Landslides occurred in Trashigang.	-	1
7	Philippines, Soccsksargen offshore, 24 km (15 mi) SW of Kablalan	7.8	57.0	IX	Further information: 2026 Mindanao earthquake	107	1,320
7	Philippines, Soccsksargen offshore, 19 km (12 mi) SW of Balangonan	6.1	44.7	VI	Aftershocks of the 2026 Mindanao earthquake.	-	-
8	Philippines, Soccsksargen offshore, 18 km (11 mi) SW of Balangonan	6.5	75.1	VI	Aftershocks of the 2026 Mindanao earthquake.	-	-
8	Cuba, Pinar del Río offshore, 99 km (62 mi) WNW of Mantua	6.1	26.0	V	Further information: 2026 Gulf of Mexico earthquake	-	-
10	New Zealand, Auckland Islands offshore	6.0	13.7	IV	-	-	-
15	Philippines, Davao offshore, 67 km (42 mi) ESE of Pondaguitan	6.2	92.8	V	-	-	-
16	Indonesia, Central Sulawesi, 46 km (29 mi) ESE of Palu	6.7	10.0	VII	Three people killed, 108 injured, 277 homes collapsed and 2,760 damaged in Sigi Regency. Two people injured and 118 structures damaged in Palu. One person injured, five homes and a road damaged in Poso Regency, and 15 homes damaged in Parigi Moutong Regency.	3	111
16	China, Qinghai, 260 km (160 mi) SSE of Dunhuang	6.3	10.0	VIII	One person killed, eight injured, several homes collapsed or damaged, and ground fissures appeared in Da Qaidam. Train services were disrupted between Xining and Lhasa.	1	8
16	Japan, Chiba, 4 km (2.5 mi) NW of Noda	5.5	71.8	IV	Two people injured in the Ōizumi-Ōta area and 16 homes damaged in Saitama Prefecture.	-	2
17	Poland, Silesia, 11 km (6.8 mi) NE of Gliwice	2.6	10.0	-	One person killed and two injured in a mine near Bytom.	1	2
17	Central Mid-Atlantic Ridge	6.6	10.0	-	-	-	-
19	Russia, Kamchatka offshore, 160 km (99 mi) ESE of Petropavlovsk-Kamchatsky	6.0	28.4	IV	Aftershocks of the 2025 Kamchatka earthquake.	-	-
19	Russia, Kamchatka offshore, 133 km (83 mi) ESE of Petropavlovsk-Kamchatsky	6.6	10.0	V	Aftershocks of the 2025 Kamchatka earthquake.	-	-
22	Bangladesh, Dhaka, 10 km (6.2 mi) SW of Narsingdi	4.4	10.0	V	One person injured due to a roof collapse at the Bangladesh University of Engineering and Technology in Dhaka.	-	1
24	United States, California, 11 km (6.8 mi) N of Redwood Valley	5.6	8.1	VIII	Six people injured and power outages occurred in Mendocino County. The roof of a house collapsed in Redwood Valley, one home slightly damaged in Ukiah and water lines disrupted in Willits.	-	6
24	Indonesia, East Nusa Tenggara, 24 km (15 mi) SSE of Tambolaka	4.3	44.8	-	Several buildings damaged in West Sumba Regency.	-	-
24	Venezuela, Yaracuy, 24 km (15 mi) ENE of San Felipe	7.2	10.0	IX	Further information: 2026 Venezuela earthquakes	6,509	226,696
24	Venezuela, La Guaira offshore, 17 km (11 mi) W of Catia La Mar	7.5	10.0	IX	Further information: 2026 Venezuela earthquakes	6,509	226,696
24	Japan, Iwate offshore, 35 km (22 mi) ENE of Kuji	6.9	51.7	VII	Ten people injured, some walls collapsed and 366 structures damaged in Aomori Prefecture. Two people injured, the ceiling of an office building collapsed and water pipes damaged in Iwate Prefecture.	-	12
26	Philippines, Davao offshore, 34 km (21 mi) WSW of Sarangani	6.5	42.0	VII	Aftershock of the 2026 Mindanao earthquake.	-	-
26	Pakistan, Balochistan, 52 km (32 mi) N of Barkhan	5.2	10.0	V	Foreshock of the 5.4 quake in June 27. Twenty people injured by wall collapses and between 80 and 90 homes damaged in the Musakhel area.	-	20
26	Japan, Yamanashi, 7 km (4.3 mi) N of Oshino	5.7	50.9	V	Eight people injured in Yamanashi, six in Tokyo, three in Shizuoka, and two each in Kanagawa and Saitama prefectures. Several walls collapsed, roof tiles fell and landslides in the epicentral area.	-	21
26	Venezuela, Aragua offshore, 54 km (34 mi) N of El Limón	4.7	10.0	IV	Aftershock of the 2026 Venezuela earthquakes. Additional damage to buildings in the Caracas area, and the bridge connecting Caraballeda and the rest of La Guaira collapsed.	-	-
27	Pakistan, Balochistan, 63 km (39 mi) NNE of Barkhan	5.4	10.0	VII	Twenty people injured, one home and the roof of a hotel collapsed and 125 houses damaged in the Musakhel area.	-	20
27	Afghanistan, Badakhshan, 43 km (27 mi) S of Jurm	6.1	199.0	IV	-	-	-
28	China, Sichuan, 8 km (5.0 mi) WNW of Changning	5.2	10.0	III	Fifteen people injured, 951 homes damaged and rockfalls in Gao County.	-	15
30	Mexico, Sinaloa offshore, 75 km (47 mi) SSW of El Progreso	6.0	10.0	V	-	-	-

=== July ===
July
- Strongest: M_{w} 7.3 Mexico
- Deadliest: M_{w} 6.8 Japan; 38 deaths
- Total fatalities: 46

Number by magnitude
- 9.0+: 0
- 8.0–8.9: 0
- 7.0–7.9: 1
- 6.0–6.9: 10
- 5.0–5.9: 217
- 4.0–4.9: 1,390

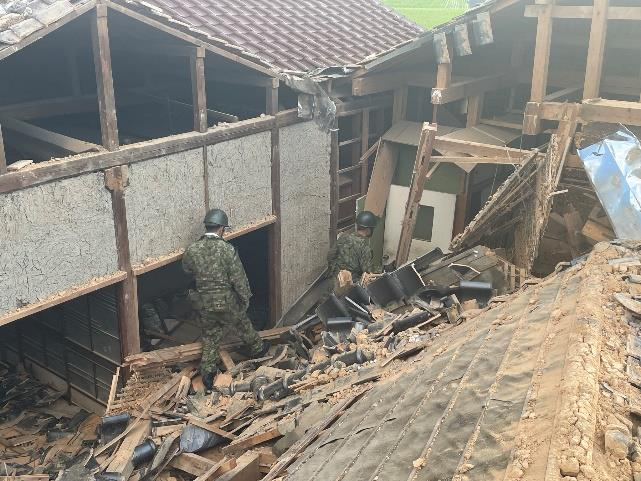
JSDF personnel inspecting a collapsed house in Kumamoto Prefecture, Japan

Date	Country and location	M	Depth (km)	MMI	Notes	Casualties	
Date	Country and location	M	Depth (km)	MMI	Notes	Dead	Injured
1	Japan, Iwate offshore, 49 km (30 mi) E of Noda	6.0	43.6	IV	-	-	-
3	Indonesia, North Maluku offshore, 58 km (36 mi) W of Tobelo	6.2	120.9	V	-	-	-
3	Japan, Okinawa offshore, 136 km (85 mi) NNE of Hirara	6.1	10.0	IV	-	-	-
7	China, Sichuan, 13 km (8.1 mi) W of Changning	5.1	10.0	III	Three people injured in Gao County.	-	3
8	China, Sichuan, 15 km (9.3 mi) NNE of Xunchang	5.0	10.0	-	Four people injured and 4,309 homes damaged in Gao County.	-	4
8	India, Maharashtra, 7 km (4.3 mi) SE of Parbhani	4.2	10.0	IV	At least 105 homes damaged in Hingoli District.	-	-
11	Poland, Lower Silesian Voivodeship, 6 km (3.7 mi) S of Grębocice	4.9	10.0	VII	One person injured at a mine near Lubin.	-	1
11	South Sandwich Islands region	6.4	26.0	IV	-	-	-
12	Indonesia, Central Sulawesi offshore, 194 km (121 mi) WNW of Gorontalo	5.4	35.0	IV	Two people killed, three others injured, six houses collapsed and at least 246 homes and 13 buildings damaged in Buol Regency.	2	3
13	Papua New Guinea, Manus offshore, 191 km (119 mi) SE of Lorengau	6.4	10.0	IV	-	-	-
13	New Caledonia offshore, southeast of the Loyalty Islands	6.3	10.0	-	-	-	-
14	Philippines, Davao offshore, 34 km (21 mi) WSW of Sarangani	6.2	47.8	VI	Aftershock of the 2026 Mindanao earthquake. Several homes destroyed, a school partially collapsed, power lines damaged and landslides in Jose Abad Santos.	-	-
16	New Zealand, Southland, 42 km (26 mi) NNW of Te Anau	5.9	76.4	V	Several homes damaged in Southland District.	-	-
17	Mexico, Chiapas offshore, 52 km (32 mi) W of Puerto Madero	7.3	22.0	VII	Eighteen people hospitalized, 4,480 others evacuated, one house collapsed, 454 structures damaged, walls and roofs collapsed and gas leaks in Chiapas. One person hospitalized, three houses destroyed, 13 homes, 26 schools and 22 public buildings damaged and three roads blocked by landslides in Guatemala.	-	19
17	Mexico, Chiapas offshore, 86 km (53 mi) WSW of Puerto Madero	6.4	10.0	V	Aftershock of the 7.3 event 32 minutes prior.	-	-
18	Turkey, Malatya, 21 km (13 mi) SE of Malatya	5.0	10.0	II	Thirty-two people injured in the Malatya area and one home partially collapsed in Battalgazi.	-	32
18	Poland, Lower Silesia, 14 km (8.7 mi) SSE of Głogów	3.5	1.0	-	Two people injured in a mine near Rudna.	-	2
19	Peru, Junín, 4 km (2.5 mi) SSW of Chupaca	5.5	10.0	VII	Further information: 2026 Huancayo earthquake	6	200
20	Iran, Kermanshah, 27 km (17 mi) S of Javanrud	4.9	10.0	-	Ten people injured, walls collapsed and some buildings damaged in the Kuzaran area.	-	10
20	Iran, Kermanshah, 27 km (17 mi) S of Javanrud	5.2	10.0	IV	Ten people injured, walls collapsed and some buildings damaged in the Kuzaran area.	-	10
20	India, Kerala, 23 km (14 mi) ENE of Thrissur	2.6	10.0	-	At least 20 homes damaged in the Thrissur area.	-	-
21	China, Yunnan, 78 km (48 mi) NE of Simao	4.9	10.0	-	At least 221 homes damaged in Mojiang and Ning'er counties.	-	-
23	Austria, Lower Austria, 1 km (0.62 mi) E of Schottwien	4.2	10.0	V	More than 35 buildings damaged in the epicentral area. Rockfalls occurred between Schottwien and Breitenstein.	-	-
24	Peru, Junín	3.6	-	-	Aftershock of the 2026 Huancayo earthquake. At least 40 homes destroyed in Chongos Alto District.	-	-
24	New Zealand, Manawatū-Whanganui, 49 km (30 mi) W of Tūrangi	5.7	10.0	VII	One person injured, minor damage to buildings and roads slipped in the Taumarunui area.	-	1
24	Vanuatu, Torba offshore, 82 km (51 mi) W of Sola	6.0	44.6	V	-	-	-
26	Indonesia, East Nusa Tenggara offshore, 25 km (16 mi) NW of Kupang	5.3	10.0	IV	The ceiling of a puskesmas collapsed in South Central Timor Regency.	-	-
28	China, Qinghai, 199 km (124 mi) NW of Oula Xiuma	5.7	10.0	VII	More than 400 homes, roads and infrastructure damaged and landslides occurred in seven townships of Xinghai County.	-	-
28	China, Qinghai, 194 km (121 mi) NW of Oula Xiuma	5.8	10.0	VII	More than 400 homes, roads and infrastructure damaged and landslides occurred in seven townships of Xinghai County.	-	-
28	Japan, Kumamoto, 3 km (1.9 mi) WSW of Uki	6.8	8.0	IX	Further information: 2026 Kumamoto earthquake	38	368
31	Italy, Campania, 0 km (0 mi) WNW of Torre Caracciolo	4.5	5.0	VII	Twenty-six people injured, two of them seriously, several buildings collapsed, many others damaged, multiple cars crushed by rubble and landslides in Pozzuoli.	-	26

=== August ===
August
- Strongest: M_{w} 7.8 Indonesia
- Deadliest: M_{w} 7.4 Colombia; 335 deaths
- Total fatalities: 486

Number by magnitude
- 9.0+: 0
- 8.0–8.9: 0
- 7.0–7.9: 2
- 6.0–6.9: 10
- 5.0–5.9: 179
- 4.0–4.9: 1,387

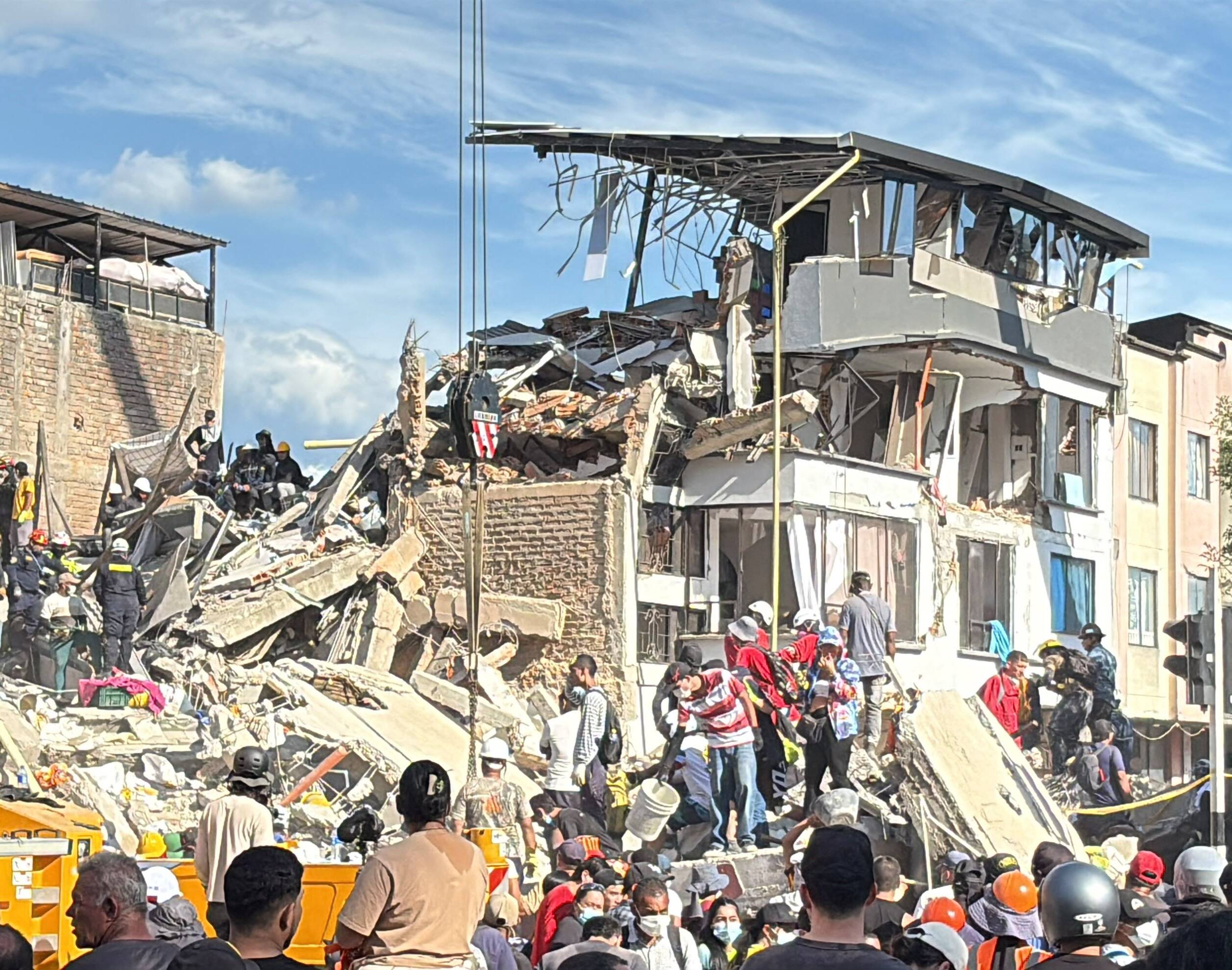
Aftermath of the quake in Pereira, Colombia

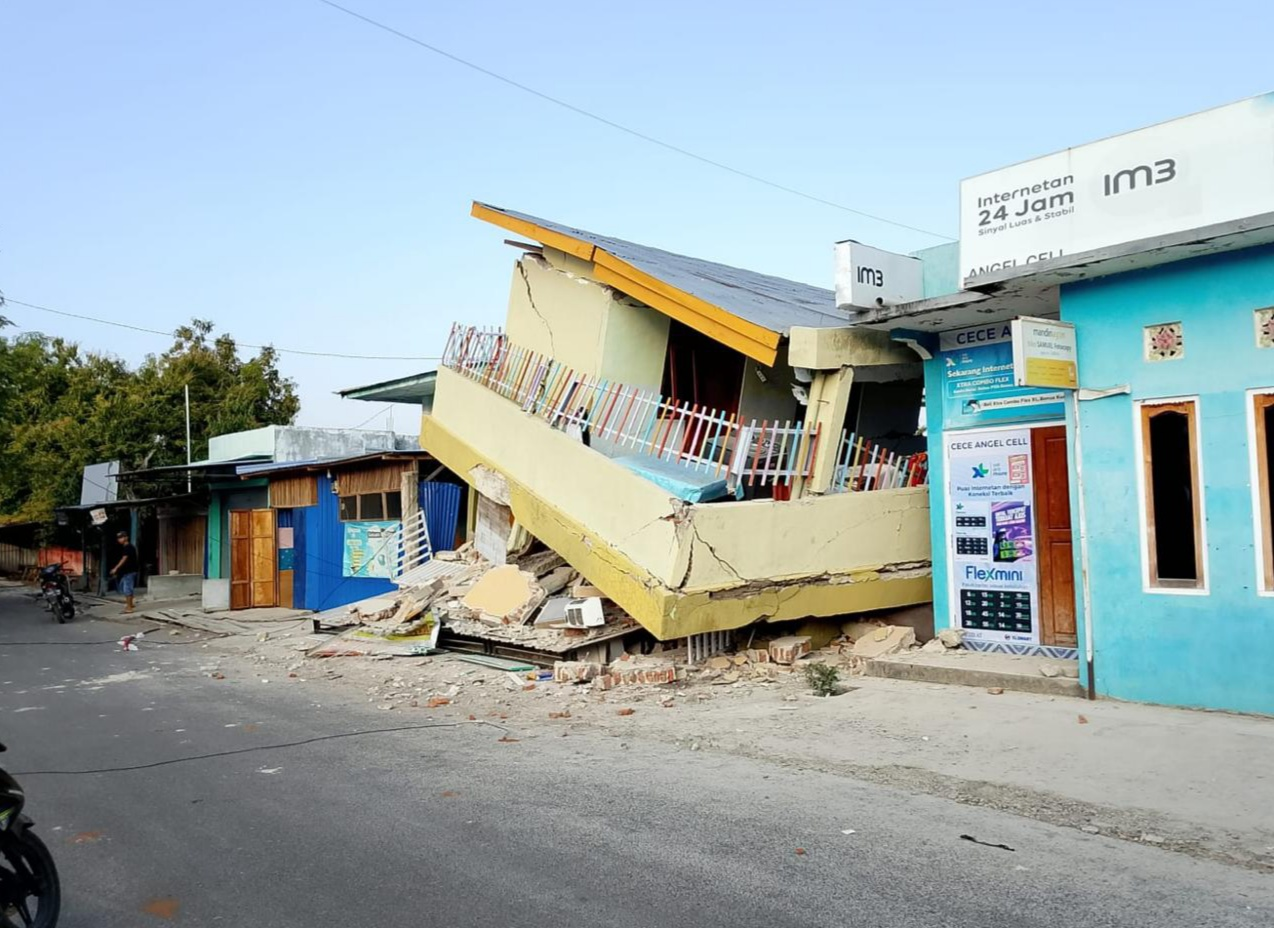
A building destroyed in East Manggarai Regency, Indonesia

Date	Country and location	M	Depth (km)	MMI	Notes	Casualties	
Date	Country and location	M	Depth (km)	MMI	Notes	Dead	Injured
1	Costa Rica, Cartago, 7 km (4.3 mi) SE of Orosi	4.3	10.0	V	One person injured in Cot District and power outages occurred in the Santiago-Cervantes area.	-	1
3	Egypt, Ismailia, 39 km (24 mi) NNE of Suez	5.0	10.0	V	One person died of a heart attack in Monufia Governorate. One person injured after the roof of a house collapsed in the Suez area and another person injured in Sharqia Governorate. At least seven buildings damaged in Beheira and Gharbia Governorates and in the Cairo-Suez area.	1	2
5	Philippines, Davao offshore, 32 km (20 mi) SW of Sarangani	6.3	10.0	VIII	Aftershock of the 2026 Mindanao earthquake. A 20 cm (7.9 in) high tsunami was observed at Sangihe Islands Regency, Indonesia.	-	-
5	New Zealand, Kermadec Islands offshore	6.3	226.1	III	-	-	-
6	Peru, Junín, 7 km (4.3 mi) SSW of Huayucachi	5.3	10.0	VI	Aftershock of the 2026 Huancayo earthquake. Fifteen people injured, more than 125 homes damaged or destroyed and landslides occurred in Junín and Huancavelica.	-	15
7	China, Sichuan, 6 km (3.7 mi) NNE of Xunchang	5.1	10.0	VI	One person killed by a collapsing wall, six others injured and 100 homes damaged in Gao County.	1	6
7	Peru, Junín, 17 km (11 mi) WNW of Yanacancha	4.7	10.0	IV	Aftershock of the 2026 Huancayo earthquake. One person killed and four others injured by rockfalls in Chupuro District.	1	4
8	India, Maharashtra, 30 km (19 mi) NW of Nashik	3.8	10.0	IV	The wall of a temple collapsed and five homes damaged in Nashik District. Ground fissures appeared in the Surgana-Trimbakeshwar area.	-	-
10	Colombia, Chocó, 5 km (3.1 mi) S of San José del Palmar	7.4	110.3	VIII	Further information: 2026 Colombia earthquake	335	4,613
12	South Sandwich Islands region	6.0	10.0	III	-	-	-
13	Pakistan, Gilgit-Baltistan, 59 km (37 mi) NNW of Barishal	5.1	58.9	II	Several homes damaged and landslides occurred in the Chapursan area.	-	-
14	Indonesia, East Nusa Tenggara offshore, 64 km (40 mi) NNW of Ende	7.8	10.0	VIII	Further information: 2026 Flores earthquake	142	1,776
14	Indonesia, East Nusa Tenggara offshore, 58 km (36 mi) N of Ende	6.1	10.0	VI	Aftershock of the 2026 Flores earthquake.	-	-
14	Spain, Andalusia, 1 km (0.62 mi) SW of Otura	5.2	10.0	VII	Some roofs and façades collapsed, at least five churches damaged, landslides occurred and power outages in the Granada area.	-	-
15	Indonesia, North Sumatra, 15 km (9.3 mi) NNW of Pematangsiantar	6.9	172.5	V	-	-	-
15	Italy, Catania, 7 km (4.3 mi) W of Linguaglossa	3.9	1.0	V	Structural and road damage in Etna.	-	-
15	Indonesia, Central Sulawesi offshore, 125 km (78 mi) NNE of Palu	5.7	72.5	IV	One person died of a heart attack, two homes and an office damaged in Parigi Moutong Regency.	1	-
16	Vanuatu, Torba, 56 km (35 mi) of NNE of Port Olry	6.1	188.1	IV	-	-	-
17	Indonesia, East Nusa Tenggara offshore, 65 km (40 mi) NNW of Ende	5.7	48.9	V	Aftershock of the 2026 Flores earthquake. Two people killed in Ngada Regency.	2	-
18	Spain, Andalusia, 2 km (1.2 mi) WSW of Granada	4.9	10.0	VI	Aftershock of the 5.2 quake on August 14. Three people injured, masonry buildings collapsed, more than 50 buildings damaged, landslides and power outages in the Granada area.	-	3
18	Peru, Lima offshore, 20 km (12 mi) WNW of San Bartolo	4.4	54.0	IV	Some homes and a chapel damaged in Lurín District.	-	-
19	Indonesia, East Nusa Tenggara, 25 km (16 mi) NNE of Ruteng	5.8	10.0	VII	Aftershock of the 2026 Flores earthquake. One person died from shock in Manggarai Regency.	1	-
20	Peru, Ayacucho, 31 km (19 mi) NW of Aniso	6.7	99.0	VI	Three people injured in Coracora, 12 homes and a bridge destroyed, 656 homes and 45 buildings damaged, power outages and landslides occurred in Apurímac, Ayacucho, and Cusco Departments.	-	3
22	Scotia Sea	6.2	10.0	IV	-	-	-
22	Japan, Ibaraki, 3 km (1.9 mi) E of Fujishiro	5.8	61.0	VI	Twenty-two people injured in Tokyo, nine in Saitama, nine in Kanagawa, four in Chiba and one in Ibaraki Prefectures. Railway operations temporarily suspended and water outages in Tokyo. A water pipe burst in Kōtō.	-	45
23	Japan, Hokkaido offshore, 33 km (21 mi) SSW of Honchō	6.0	42.9	IV	-	-	-
24	Costa Rica, Cartago, 10 km (6.2 mi) NNW of Cot	4.9	10.0	VII	Some buildings damaged and landslides in the epicentral area.	-	-
24	Indonesia, Maluku offshore, 215 km (134 mi) NNE of Lospalos, East Timor	6.0	10.0	IV	-	-	-
25	Afghanistan, Nangarhar, 4 km (2.5 mi) NNE of Jalalabad	4.9	10.0	VI	Fifteen people injured in the Bihsud-Jalalabad-Kuz Kunar area.	-	15
26	Turkey, Kayseri, 13 km (8.1 mi) E of Pınarbaşı	4.3	10.0	-	The wall of a house collapsed and some homes damaged in the Pınarbaşı area.	-	-
26	Indonesia, East Nusa Tenggara offshore, 54 km (34 mi) NNW of Ende	5.0	10.0	-	Aftershock of the 2026 Flores earthquake. Two people injured in Palue Island.	-	2
26	Colombia, Santander, 4 km (2.5 mi) E of Jordán	4.9	159.9	III	Three homes damaged in Argelia.	-	-

=== September ===
September
- Strongest: M_{w} 6.7 New Caledonia
- Total fatalities: 0

Number by magnitude
- 9.0+: 0
- 8.0–8.9: 0
- 7.0–7.9: 0
- 6.0–6.9: 6
- 5.0–5.9: 158
- 4.0–4.9: 1,062

Date	Country and location	M	Depth (km)	MMI	Notes	Casualties	
Date	Country and location	M	Depth (km)	MMI	Notes	Dead	Injured
1	Indonesia, North Maluku offshore, 87 km (54 mi) SE of Maba	5.4	10.0	VII	At least 35 buildings damaged in Central Halmahera Regency.	-	-
2	South Sandwich Islands region	6.2	111.0	IV	-	-	-
3	United States, Alaska offshore, 92 km (57 mi) SSW of Nikolski	6.3	21.0	IV	-	-	-
4	Indonesia, Central Java offshore, 30 km (19 mi) SSE of Cilacap	5.2	10.0	IV	One house severely damaged in Ciamis Regency.	-	-
8	Nepal, Gandaki, 90 km (56 mi) NNE of Chitre	4.9	10.0	V	Three homes collapsed, between 300 to 500 others and a monastery damaged in Mustang District.	-	-
11	Indonesia, Jakarta offshore, 121 km (75 mi) NNE of Teluknaga	6.5	372.0	III	-	-	-
11	Indonesia, Central Java, 11 km (6.8 mi) N of Wonosobo	3.9	10.0	-	One house collapsed in Batang Regency.	-	-
17	United States, Alaska offshore, 177 km (110 mi) W of Nikolski	6.5	98.0	V	-	-	-
14	Iran, Razavi Khorasan, 48 km (30 mi) NNE of Kashmar	4.2	10.0	-	Some homes and buildings damaged in Kuhsorkh County.	-	-
18	Puerto Rico, Yauco offshore, 5 km (3.1 mi) SW of Guánica	4.8	7.0	IV	Three people hospitalized and one school damaged in Yauco.	-	3
20	Papua New Guinea, Madang, 50 km (31 mi) NNE of Kainantu	6.4	113.0	V	-	-	-
21	Peru, Cusco, 11 km (6.8 mi) ENE of Chinchaypujio	4.3	10.0	III	The ceiling tiles of Alejandro Velasco Astete International Airport collapsed, one school damaged and landslides occurred in the Cusco area.	-	-
21	Indonesia, East Nusa Tenggara, 35 km (22 mi) NNE of Ruteng	5.0	10.0	VII	Aftershock of the 2026 Flores earthquake. One person injured by falling debris and an under construction temporary housing collapsed in East Manggarai Regency.	-	1
24	Turkey, Şanlıurfa, 20 km (12 mi) SW of Hilvan	5.1	10.0	V	Forty people injured or hospitalized, several homes and buildings including the Şanlıurfa GAP Airport damaged in the Karaköprü-Urfa area.	-	40
25	New Caledonia, Loyalty Islands offshore, 74 km (46 mi) ENE of Tadine	6.7	10.0	VI	-	-	-

=== October ===
October
- Strongest: M_{w} 7.7 Panama
- Deadliest: M_{w} 7.0 China; 16 deaths
- Total fatalities: 26

Number by magnitude
- 9.0+: 0
- 8.0–8.9: 0
- 7.0–7.9: 2
- 6.0–6.9: 19
- 5.0–5.9: 195
- 4.0–4.9: 974

A damaged building in Penonomé, Panama

Date	Country and location	M	Depth (km)	MMI	Notes	Casualties	
Date	Country and location	M	Depth (km)	MMI	Notes	Dead	Injured
3	Indonesia, East Nusa Tenggara offshore, 39 km (24 mi) WSW of Tambolaka	5.9	46.0	VI	One person killed, another person injured and 325 structures damaged in Southwest Sumba Regency.	1	1
6	India, Uttarakhand, 34 km (21 mi) NW of Bageshwar	5.1	10.0	V	One building cracked and later collapsed in Delhi, killing five people and injuring eight others.	5	8
8	Vanuatu, Penama, 102 km (63 mi) NE of Norsup	6.3	10.0	VIII	-	-	-
9	Panama, Herrera, 10 km (6.2 mi) WSW of Pitaloza Arriba	7.7	12.6	IX	Further information: 2026 Panama earthquake	3	27
9	Panama, Veraguas, 14 km (8.7 mi) W of Río Grande	6.6	10.0	VIII	Aftershock of the 2026 Panama earthquake.	-	-
10	Russia, Kemerovo, 7 km (4.3 mi) S of Trudarmeyskiy	4.7	10.0	II	Some buildings badly damaged in the epicentral area.	-	-
10	Panama, Los Santos, 7 km (4.3 mi) N of La Tronosa	6.0	10.0	VIII	Aftershock of the 2026 Panama earthquake.	-	-
11	Papua New Guinea, Bougainville offshore, 79 km (49 mi) SSE of Panguna	6.2	53.5	V	-	-	-
12	Panama, Veraguas, 17 km (11 mi) W of Río Grande	6.1	11.0	VII	Aftershock of the 2026 Panama earthquake.	-	-
13	Central Mid-Atlantic Ridge	6.7	10.0	-	Doublet earthquake.	-	-
13	Central Mid-Atlantic Ridge	6.8	10.0	-	Doublet earthquake.	-	-
13	Papua New Guinea, East New Britain offshore, 126 km (78 mi) S of Kokopo	6.0	20.8	VI	-	-	-
15	Indonesia, West Java, 28 km (17 mi) SW of Bogor	4.1	10.0	-	One person injured and at least 349 homes and five places of worship damaged in Bogor and Sukabumi regencies.	-	1
16	Russia, Kamchatka, 76 km (47 mi) NE of Ozernovskiy	6.9	135.0	VI	Triggered a false alarm in Japan for a M9.9 earthquake (off by a factor of 1000).	-	-
17	Pakistan, Balochistan, 48 km (30 mi) WNW of Khuzdar	5.7	10.0	VII	One person killed by a rockfall and several homes damaged in the Nal area.	1	-
18	Vietnam, Sơn La, 33 km (21 mi) SE of Sơn La	4.4	10.0	-	Many houses and buildings damaged in the Mai Sơn area, including one home severely damaged by rockfalls.	-	-
19	Vanuatu, Sanma offshore, 186 km (116 mi) NW of Port Olry	6.0	10.0	IV	-	-	-
20	Vanuatu, Sanma offshore, 197 km (122 mi) NW of Port Olry	6.3	16.0	IV	-	-	-
22	China, Tibet Autonomous Region, 189 km (117 mi) ENE of Nagqu	7.0	18.0	IX	Further information: 2026 Tibet earthquake	16	76
24	Vanuatu, Sanma offshore, 197 km (122 mi) WNW of Port Olry	6.9	10.0	V	Strongest in an earthquake swarm.	-	-
24	Vanuatu, Sanma offshore, 170 km (110 mi) NW of Port Olry	6.3	10.0	IV	-	-	-
25	Japan, Bonin Islands offshore	6.5	492.4	-	-	-	-
25	Vanuatu, Sanma offshore, 25 km (16 mi) ENE of Port Olry	6.1	116.0	IV	-	-	-
28	Vanuatu, Sanma offshore, 214 km (133 mi) NW of Port Olry	6.0	10.0	I	-	-	-
29	southeast of Easter Island	6.4	10.0	-	-	-	-
29	Vanuatu, Sanma offshore, 43 km (27 mi) ESE of Port Olry	6.2	142.8	IV	-	-	-
30	India, Maharashtra, 22 km (14 mi) ENE of Dahanu	3.2	7.0	-	Hundreds of homes damaged in Palghar district.	-	-
31	Panama, Los Santos, 4 km (2.5 mi) S of Bajo Corral	5.2	10.0	V	Aftershock of the 2026 Panama earthquake. Additional damage to homes and power outages occurred in the Cañas area.	-	-
31	Japan, Mie offshore, 58 km (36 mi) SSE of Shima	6.0	352.4	III	-	-	-

=== November ===
November
- Strongest: M_{w} 6.8 Indonesia
- Deadliest: M_{w} 6.7 Peru; 1 death
- Total fatalities: 1

Number by magnitude
- 9.0+: 0
- 8.0–8.9: 0
- 7.0–7.9: 0
- 6.0–6.9: 7
- 5.0–5.9: 23
- 4.0–4.9: 95

Date	Country and location	M	Depth (km)	MMI	Notes	Casualties	
Date	Country and location	M	Depth (km)	MMI	Notes	Dead	Injured
1	Vanuatu, Sanma offshore, 165 km (103 mi) NW of Port Olry	6.0	10.0	IV	-	-	-
3	Colombia, Tolima, 24 km (15 mi) NNW of Rioblanco	5.4	10.0	VI	Two people injured and at least 120 homes damaged in Chaparral. One structure damaged in Ibagué. Power outages occurred in the Chaparral-Roncesvalles area. One church partially collapsed in Quimbaya. Ground cracks appeared in the Ortega area.	-	2
5	Fiji region	6.1	535.0	I	-	-	-
6	Japan, Chiba offshore, 144 km (89 mi) SE of Hasaki	6.1	29.0	IV	-	-	-
7	Japan, Shizuoka, 10 km (6.2 mi) NW of Hamakita	5.5	38.1	VI	At least 19 people injured, a wall partially collapsed, two homes damaged, items knocked off shelves, windows shattered, water outages and a rockfall occurred in Aichi prefecture. Three people injured in Shizuoka prefecture.	-	22
9	Solomon Islands, Temotu offshore, 30 km (19 mi) WSW of Lata	6.4	17.0	VI	-	-	-
16	Indonesia, Maluku offshore, 148 km (92 mi) WSW of Tual	6.6	68.0	V	One warehouse damaged after a pile of sacks of rice fell onto its walls in the Tual area. Two water pipes damaged or broken in Southwest Maluku Regency.	-	-
17	Mexico, Chiapas, 6 km (3.7 mi) ENE of Bachajón	4.4	10.0	V	One person injured, one home destroyed and 20 structures damaged in the Bachajón area.	-	1
18	Romania, Covasna, 16 km (9.9 mi) ESE of Comandău	5.3	130.3	VI	One person injured in Galați County and another person injured in Râmnicu Sărat. A chimney of an abandoned house collapsed in the Brăila area.	-	2
18	Japan, Kumamoto, 4 km (2.5 mi) NNW of Tsunagi	5.3	10.0	V	Two people injured in Mashiki and Minamata and 23 homes damaged in the Ashikita-Tsunagi area. Cracks appeared in the pavement of a section of the Minamikyushu Expressway.	-	2
18	Pacific-Antarctic Ridge	6.1	10.0	-	-	-	-
21	Peru, Junín, 9 km (5.6 mi) NE of Carhuamayo	6.7	108.0	VI	One person killed in Huánuco District. At least 15 people injured, 322 homes, seven schools, 28 health centers, four churches, three local buildings and 300 m (980 ft) of road damaged, landslides and power outages occurred in Callao, Huánuco, Junín, Lima, and Pasco departments.	1	15
21	Indonesia, Maluku offshore, 103 km (64 mi) NE of Lospalos, Timor-Leste	6.8	143.4	V	One home destroyed and six others damaged in Southwest Maluku Regency. Activity at the Raitahu mud volcano near Viqueque increased after the earthquake.	-	-

== See also ==
- Lists of 21st-century earthquakes
- List of earthquakes 2021–present
- Lists of earthquakes by year
- Lists of earthquakes
