= Jurm =

Jurm may refer to:

- Jurm District, Badakhshan Province, Afghanistan
- Jurm, Afghanistan, also spelled Jorm, the capital of the district
- Jurm (1990 film), a Bollywood film starring Vinod Khanna
- Jurm (2005 film), a Bollywood film starring Bobby Deol and Lara Dutta
- Jurm (TV series), a 2023 Pakistani crime-thriller mini-series
