= Soná =

Soná may refer to:

- Soná District in the province of Veraguas, Panama
- Soná, Panama, a corregimiento (subdivision of a district) in Soná District
