= Pyrenula luteopruinosa =

Scientific classification
- Domain: Eukaryota
- Kingdom: Fungi
- Division: Ascomycota
- Class: Eurotiomycetes
- Order: Pyrenulales
- Family: Pyrenulaceae
- Genus: Pyrenula
- Species: P. luteopruinosa

Binomial name
- Pyrenula luteopruinosa Etayo & Aptroot (2003)

Species of lichen

Pyrenula luteopruinosa is a species of corticolous (bark-dwelling), crustose lichen in the family Pyrenulaceae. It has a neotropical distribution, occurring in Panama, Costa Rica, Puerto Rico, and Hawaii.

== Taxonomy ==
Formally described as a new species in 2003 by lichenologists Javiar Etayo and André Aptroot, the species epithet luteopruinosa refers to the characteristic yellow pruina on its perithecia. The type specimen was collected near a frog trail (genus Dendrobates) in Bahía Honda, Veraguas; in this habitat in lowland rainforest on the Pacific coast of Panama, the lichen was found growing on the smooth bark of a tree.

== Description ==
The lichen has a small, brown to dark brown, smooth thallus lacking a cortex and a prothallus. Its apothecia are in the form of perithecia, partially immersed in the substrata, measuring 0.5–0.6 mm in diameter. The perithecia are covered by a characteristic lemon-yellow pruina – dust-like particles of crystalline pigment. The ascospores are ellipsoid to somewhat cylindrical with conical ends, have 3 septa, and typically measure 14–19 by 8–10 μm.

Pyrenula pileata, found in upland and alpine areas of the Philippines and New Guinea, is similar in appearance to P. luteopruinosa, but it lacks the yellow pruina, has larger ascomata (1.3–2.2 mm), and larger ascospores (16–24 x 8–13 μm).

== See also ==
- List of Pyrenula species
