= Guarumal =

Guarumal may refer to:

- Guarumal, Veraguas, Panama
- Guarumal, Chiriquí, Panama
