= 2026 Jurm earthquake =

2026 earthquake in Jurm, Afghanistan

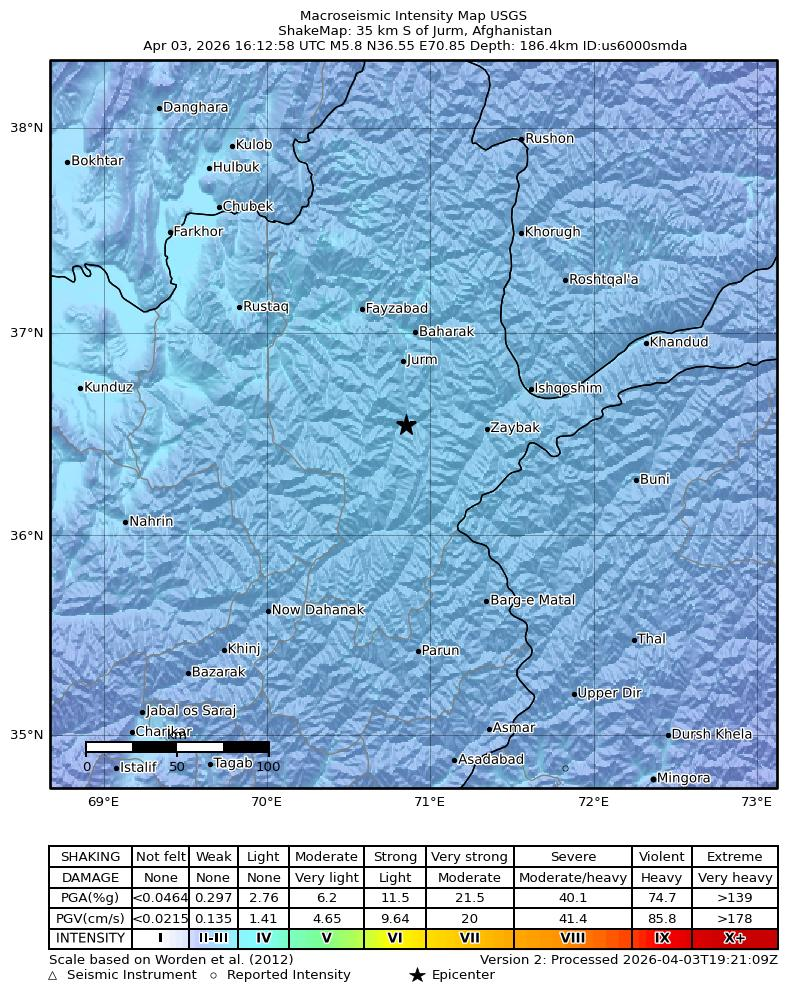
- USGS ShakeMap

- UTC time: 2026-04-03 16:12:58
- ISC event: 645589718
- USGS-ANSS: ComCat
- Local date: April 3, 2026
- Local time: 20:42 AFT (UTC+04:30)
- Magnitude: M_{w} 5.8
- Depth: 188.0 km (117 mi)
- Epicenter: 36.548°N 70.852°E
- Areas affected: Afghanistan, North Pakistan, India
- Max. intensity: MMI III (Weak)
- Casualties: 12 deaths, 6 injuries

On April 3, 2026, a M_{w} 5.8 earthquake struck the Hindu Kush region of Afghanistan. The epicenter was located 35 kilometres (22 mi) S of Jurm at a depth of 188.0 km (117 mi). Twelve people were killed and six others were injured.

== Tectonic setting ==
The Himalayas, partially formed by the collision of tectonic plates, are prone to devastating earthquakes. Afghanistan is situated near the southern extent of the Eurasian plate. Most of these earthquakes are associated with reverse, thrust, or strike-slip faulting. Large earthquakes with magnitudes of up to 7.5 have occurred in the region with an average recurrence interval of 15 years. These earthquakes correspond to reverse faulting at a depth of 170 to 280 km (110 to 170 mi). These earthquakes, rather than occurring at a plate boundary, are sourced from within the Indian plate as it dives beneath the Hindu Kush. As the tectonic slab of the Indian plate descends at a near-vertical angle into the mantle, it stretches and begins to "tear", eventually leading to a slab detachment. This action results in stress accommodation along faults that produces earthquakes when ruptured. Smaller shallow focus earthquakes are also observed in the region, particularly associated with north–south trending zones of right lateral strike-slip, such as the Chaman Fault, with an increasing degree of shortening to the north, together accommodating the highly oblique convergence between the Indian and the Eurasian plates.

== Earthquake ==
The earthquake struck about 35 km (22 mi) south of Jurm in Badakhshan Province. An estimated 16.54 million people in Afghanistan, Pakistan and Tajikistan felt MMI II–III (Weak) shaking. Tremors were also felt across Delhi and several parts of north India, including Jammu and Kashmir and Punjab. It was also felt in Islamabad and Gilgit-Baltistan, Pakistan.

== Impact ==
Twelve people were killed and four others were injured in Afghanistan. Five homes collapsed and another 33 were damaged in six provinces of Afghanistan, affecting 40 families. The casualties included eight people killed and a three-year-old boy injured when a house collapsed near Kabul, all members of the same family. Two people were injured in Khyber Pakhtunkhwa, Pakistan. The Kapoor Haveli mansion in Peshawar partially collapsed due to the shaking and heavy rainfall. Authorities said that a solid assessment of damage could potentially be delayed because of the remoteness of the epicenter of the earthquake. Due to the epicenter being remote, it can often take several hours before local authorities can relay information back to Kabul. Provincial health authorities in the country were put on alert.

== Responses ==
India announced on 5 April 2026 that they sent an aid package containing kitchen utensils, hygiene kits, blankets and other essential items to victims of the earthquake and recent floods in the country.

== See also ==
- List of earthquakes in 2026
- List of earthquakes in Afghanistan
- 2002 Hindu Kush earthquakes
- October 2015 Hindu Kush earthquake
- 2023 Badakhshan earthquake
- 2025 Kunar earthquake
- 2025 Balkh earthquake
- 2026 Gilgit-Baltistan earthquake
