= Dubhe (disambiguation) =

Dubhe is a multiple star system in the constellation Ursa Major.

Dubhe may also refer to:

- Dubhe (singer) (1968–2016), a Tibetan Lutenist and singer-songwriter
- USS Dubhe, a United States Navy cargo ship
