= Jirim =

Jirim may refer to:

- Jurm District
- Tongliao previously known as Jirim League in Inner Mongolia, China
