= El Marañón =

Coordinates: 8.0333°N 81.2167°W

- Corregimiento
- Location within Panama
- Country: Panama
- Province: Veraguas
- District: Soná

Area
  - Land: 114.2 km^{2} (44.1 sq mi)

Population (2010)
  - Total: 2,322
  - Density: 20.3/km^{2} (53/sq mi)
- Population density calculated based on land area.
- Time zone: UTC−5 (EST)

El Marañón is a corregimiento in Soná District, Veraguas Province, Panama with a population of 2,322 as of 2010. Its population as of 1990 was 2,126; its population as of 2000 was 2,275.
