= 2026 North Maluku earthquake =

Earthquake in North Maluku, Indonesia

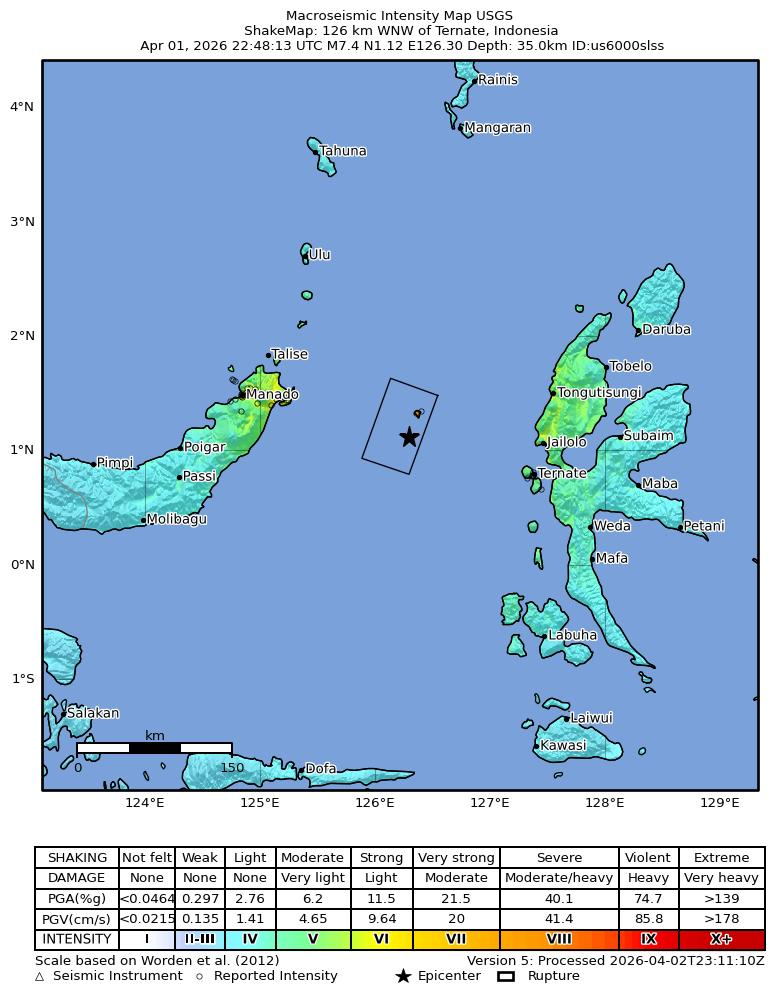
- USGS ShakeMap
- UTC time: 2026-04-01 22:48:13
- ISC event: 645587339
- USGS-ANSS: ComCat
- Local date: 2 April 2026
- Local time: 06:48:13 WITA (UTC+8) 07:48:13 WIT (UTC+9)
- Duration: 30 seconds
- Magnitude: M_{w} 7.4
- Depth: 35 km (22 mi)
- Epicenter: 1.117°N 126.297°E
- Type: Reverse
- Areas affected: North Sulawesi, Gorontalo and North Maluku, Indonesia
- Total damage: More than 450 structures damaged or destroyed
- Max. intensity: MMI VIII (Severe)
- Tsunami: 75 cm (2.46 ft)
- Landslides: Yes
- Aftershocks: c. 1,378+ recorded Strongest: M_{wb} 6.2
- Casualties: 1 death, 4 injuries

On 2 April 2026, a M_{w} 7.4 earthquake struck the Molucca Sea, between North Sulawesi and North Maluku Provinces, Indonesia. The offshore epicenter was located near the Batang Dua Islands, at a depth of 35 km (22 mi). One person was killed, four were injured and over 450 structures were damaged or destroyed, the majority of them in the Batang Dua Islands.

== Tectonic setting ==
The unique and complex tectonic setting of the Molucca Sea region is the only global example of an active arc-arc collision consuming an oceanic basin via subduction in two directions. The Molucca Sea plate is subsumed by tectonic microplates, the Halmahera plate and the Sangihe plate. The whole complexity is now known as the Molucca Sea Collision Zone.

According to the United States Geological Survey (USGS), this tectonic region has been the source of 115 earthquakes exceeding M_{w} 6.0 since 1908, including 18 >M_{w} 7.0 events. The largest events to strike this zone were two M_{w} 7.7 events in 1932 and 1968, respectively.

== Earthquake ==
According to Indonesia's Meteorology, Climatology, and Geophysical Agency (BMKG), the earthquake's epicenter was located some 127 kilometres (79 mi) from the city of Bitung in the province of North Sulawesi, and close to the Batang Dua Islands which is administratively part of the city of Ternate in North Maluku province. The BMKG reported a magnitude of M_{w} 7.3, while the United States Geological Survey (USGS) put the magnitude at M_{ww} 7.4. It struck at a depth of 35.0 kilometres (21.7 mi) according to the USGS. The focal mechanism of the earthquake corresponded to reverse faulting, moderately dipping towards either the northwest or the southeast, in line with the general trend of earthquakes in the region. A rupture area of 100 km (62 mi) x 55 km (34 mi) was estimated, rupturing directly through the Batang Dua Islands, with a maximum slip of 1.0241 m (3.360 ft) west of the hypocenter. The observed source time function gives a 30 second duration for the earthquake, with the greatest phase of seismic moment release occurring about 15 seconds after initiation.

The Modified Mercalli intensity (MMI) was estimated (according to USGS information) at VIII (Severe) in the Batang Dua Islands, VII (Very Strong) in Bitung, VI (Strong) at Ternate, V (Moderate) at Ibu and Manado, and III (Weak) at Gorontalo, Bone Bolango, North Gorontalo, Boalemo and Pohuwato. The earthquake was followed by at least 1,378 aftershocks (25 of them being felt), with the largest having a magnitude of M_{wb} 6.2. A 75 cm (2.46 ft) tsunami was observed in North Minahasa Regency, 65 cm (2.13 ft) in Kema, 15 cm (0.49 ft) in Beo, 13 cm (0.43 ft) in Talengen and 5 cm (0.16 ft) at Davao City, Philippines.

== Impact ==
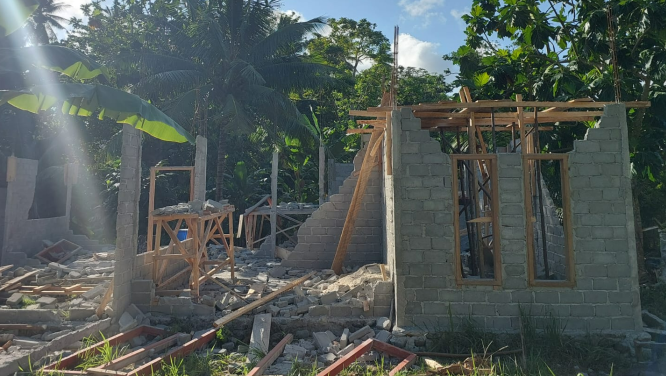
House damage in Batang Dua Islands

One person died after a sports centre collapsed and two others were injured in Manado. A Siloam Hospital was seriously damaged. Five government buildings and a hotel were also damaged in the city. In the Batang Dua Islands, near the rupture area, one person was injured, 1,966 others were displaced, 104 homes collapsed, 85 were moderately damaged and 79 were slightly damaged. In addition, six churches, a school and two public facilities were destroyed, with eight more churches damaged. At least 23 homes on Ternate Island, and 41 structures in Bitung were also affected. The kitchen of a house was destroyed by a landslide and the walls of a mosque and several government offices collapsed in the city. Across Halmahera, two homes collapsed, 12 others, a bridge and a school were damaged. At least 27 homes collapsed, 25 others, five places of worship and a public facility were damaged on Tidore. In Minahasa Regency, one person was injured, 17 homes, three buildings and a road were damaged. Three churches were also damaged in the regency and in Tomohon. Several roads in Gorontalo were damaged or struck by landslides.

== See also ==
- List of earthquakes in 2026
- List of earthquakes in Indonesia
- 2026 Pacitan earthquake
