= Cativé =

Coordinates: 7.9275°N 81.3731°W

- Corregimiento
- Location within Panama
- Country: Panama
- Province: Veraguas
- District: Soná

Area
  - Land: 131.8 km^{2} (50.9 sq mi)

Population (2010)
  - Total: 822
  - Density: 6.2/km^{2} (16/sq mi)
- Population density calculated based on land area.
- Time zone: UTC−5 (EST)

Cativé is a corregimiento in Soná District, Veraguas Province, Panama, with a population of 822 as of 2010. Its population as of 1990 was 1,296; its population as of 2000 was 890.
