= 2026 Tibet earthquake =

Earthquake in Asia

- USGS Shakemap

- Location within Tibet Location within China
- UTC time: 2026-10-22 14:33:39
- ISC event
- USGS-ANSS: ComCat
- Local date: 22 October 2026
- Local time: 22:33:39 CST (UTC+8)
- Magnitude: M_{w} 7.0
- Depth: 18 km (11 mi)
- Epicenter: 32.380°N 93.780°E
- Type: Normal
- Areas affected: Tibet, China
- Max. intensity: CSIS IX (MMI IX)
- Aftershocks: 2,064+, largest M_{w} 5.9
- Casualties: 16 dead, 76 injured

On 22 October 2026, at 22:33:39 CST, a M_{w} 7.0 earthquake struck the northern part of Nagqu, part of the Tibet Autonomous Region in Southwestern China. At least 16 people were killed and 76 others were injured.

== Tectonic setting ==
The Tibetan Plateau attains its high elevation due to crustal thickening caused by the collision of the Indian tectonic plate with the Eurasian plate, creating the Himalayas. Faulting within the plateau is associated with strike-slip and normal mechanisms. The plateau extends in an east–west direction evidenced by north–south striking grabens, strike-slip faulting and GPS data. In the northern region, strike-slip faulting constitutes the dominant style of tectonics while in the south, the dominant tectonic domain is east–west extension on north–south trending normal faults. Seven north–south trending rifts and normal faults were first discovered in southern Tibet during the late 1970s and early 1980s using satellite imagery. They began formation when extension occurred some 4 to 8 million years ago.

== Earthquake ==
Both the United States Geological Survey (USGS) and China Earthquake Networks Center (CENC) reported a magnitude of 7.0. The earthquake had an epicenter located in Baqên County within the city of Nagqu, near the border with Qinghai Province. It was caused by movement on either a northeast or north–northwest trending normal fault dipping southeast or west–southwest, respectively. The USGS estimated the size of the fault rupture for its corresponding magnitude to be about 50 by 20 km (31 by 12 mi). A normal-faulting source is consistent with ongoing east–west extension within the Tibetan Plateau caused by gravity.

According to the China Earthquake Administration, the earthquake occurred within the Qiangtang terrane (a continental terrane). The block itself has experienced five other magnitude 7.0 or larger events since 1900. The largest was a magnitude 7.5 event on 8 November 1997. No magnitude 7.0 or larger earthquakes have been recorded within a 200 km (120 mi) radius around the epicenter of the 22 October earthquake, although it previously experienced magnitude 6.0 or larger events in 1971, 1994 and 2021.

Scientists at the Institute of Tibetan Plateau Research, an extension of the Chinese Academy of Sciences, published a finite fault model for the event. Their focal mechanism indicated almost purely dip-slip normal faulting on a north–northeast trending plane dipping at a shallow angle either towards the southeast or northwest. The event initiated at a depth of 8.3 km (5.2 mi), lasting for 16 seconds, and with slip reaching the surface. The finite fault model favored the southeast dipping one which has a dip angle of 51.8°. The model simulated a 60 by 33 km (37 by 21 mi) fault divided into 165 subfault pixels each about 4 by 3 km (2.5 by 1.9 mi). Slip of more than 40 cm (16 in) occurred within a 52 by 24 km (32 by 15 mi) region within the model. There are three slip patches; the largest was south–southwest of the hypocenter, where the largest displacement of 196 cm (77 in) occurred. North–northeast of the hypocenter, the second largest patch exhibiting slip exceeding 160 cm (63 in). The third and smallest slip patch is immediately beneath the hypocenter where it peaked at nearly 160 cm (63 in). Within the hypocenter itself, the slip was about 80 cm (31 in).

== Impact ==
The earthquake struck a relatively unpopulated area where the average elevation is about 4,800 m (15,700 ft). In Baqên County, 16 fatalities were reported and 76 others were injured, including 11 seriously, according to the Chinese government. The Central Tibetan Administration reported at least 20 fatalities in three villages in the county. At least 339 homes collapsed and 20 livestock sheds were damaged in the county. Building collapses, ground cracks and damage to walls were reported in Mărú Township. In Kamlung Gal village, 10 people died. In Gangcheng Township, two villages were almost completely destroyed, while extensive destruction was also reported in Zasip Township. Rockfalls caused damage to a car and guardrails and blocked a section of National Highway 317.

== Response ==
The Ministry of Emergency Management dispatched its disaster response group led by the State Council Earthquake Relief Headquarters and China Earthquake Administration. At 04:30 on 23 October, relief supplies from the Nagqu Municipal Committee arrived in the affected area. The shipment contained prefabricated homes, tents, foldable beds, quilts, and stoves among other goods. 12,489 people were evacuated.

Search and rescue efforts were conducted overnight. The Western Theater Command used drones to perform reconnaissance flights over the affected area. More than 300 members and 20 vehicles from the Tibet Military Region and Tibet Armed Police Corps were activated. The Tibet Armed Police Corps also activated its field medical team and rescue vehicles.

== See also ==
- List of earthquakes in 2026
- List of earthquakes in China
- 2025 Tibet earthquake
