= Calidonia, Veraguas =

Coordinates: 7.9414°N 81.3722°W

Calidonia
- Corregimiento
- Location within Panama
- Country: Panama
- Province: Veraguas
- District: Soná

Area
  - Land: 158.2 km^{2} (61.1 sq mi)

Population (2010)
  - Total: 1,419
  - Density: 9/km^{2} (23/sq mi)
- Population density calculated based on land area.
- Time zone: UTC−5 (EST)

Calidonia is a corregimiento in Soná District, Veraguas Province, Panama with a population of 1,419 as of 2010. Its population as of 1990 was 1,805; its population as of 2000 was 1,427.
