= Quebrada de Oro =

Coordinates: 8.0333°N 81.3833°W

- Corregimiento
- Location within Panama
- Country: Panama
- Province: Veraguas
- District: Soná

Area
  - Land: 60.8 km^{2} (23.5 sq mi)

Population (2010)
  - Total: 955
  - Density: 15.7/km^{2} (41/sq mi)
- Population density calculated based on land area.
- Time zone: UTC−5 (EST)

Quebrada de Oro is a corregimiento in Soná District, Veraguas Province, Panama with a population of 955 as of 2010. Its population as of 1990 was 1,037; its population as of 2000 was 938.
