= Nima, Gansu =

Nima 尼玛镇
- Town
- Nimazhen
- Location in Gansu
- Coordinates: 33°59′43″N 102°4′37″E
- Country: People's Republic of China
- Province: Gansu
- Autonomous prefecture: Gannan Tibetan Autonomous Prefecture
- County: Maqu County

Area
  - Total: 1,040 km^{2} (400 sq mi)

Population (2010)
  - Total: 17,820
  - Density: 17.1/km^{2} (44.4/sq mi)
- Time zone: UTC+8 (China Standard)
- Local dialing code: 941

Nima (Chinese: 尼玛镇) is a town in Maqu County, Gannan Tibetan Autonomous Prefecture, Gansu, China. In 2010, Nima had a total population of 17,820: 9,936 males and 7,884 females: 3,910 aged under 14, 13,276 aged between 15 and 65 and 634 aged over 65.

== See also ==
- List of township-level divisions of Gansu
