= Dubhe (singer) =

Tibetan musician (1968–2016)

Dubhe བདུད་བྷེ།
- Born: 1968; Manrima Town, Maqu County, Gannan Tibetan Autonomous Prefecture, Gansu, China
- Died: 26 February 2016 (aged 47–48) Chengdu, China
- Genre: Dunglen
- Occupations: Singer, songwriter
- Instruments: Dramyin, mandolin
- Years active: 1980s–2016

Dubhe (Tibetan: བདུད་བྷེ།; 1968 – 26 February 2016) was a Tibetan singer and songwriter.

A native of Maqu County, China, Dubhe was a songwriter in the Dunglen style—a form of Tibetan lute singing—from the Amdo region. His performances typically featured his vocals accompanied by the dramyin, a traditional Tibetan lute, and often incorporated elements of mandolin playing. This fusion of traditional and modern musical styles earned him the nickname "Cuckoo of the Snow Land".

== Biography ==
Dubhe was born in Manrima Town, Maqu County, Gannan Tibetan Autonomous Prefecture, Gansu Province, and grew up in the Amdo pastoral area as a nomadic farmer. He was influenced by traditional Tibetan nomadic culture and local folk music.

In the early 1980s, during a period of cultural revival in Tibet, he began singing in the Dunglen style. His early music was rooted in the oral traditions and impromptu chanting of nomadic life. Dubhe studied under Hu'er Gong. In 1986, he began working with the Maqu Song and Dance Troupe. He began to perform and record professionally, releasing fifteen Dunglen cassette tapes, including Snow Mountain Love, Kelsang Lhamo, Tsering Tsom, and three cassettes featuring his own lyrics, compositions, and vocals.

Dubhe died in Chengdu, on 26 February 2016, aged 47. Religious and cultural leaders, including the Karmapa, offered their condolences, praising him as "Cuckoo of the Snow Land."

== Legacy ==
Dubhe's songs typically feature straightforward melodic lines and narrative lyrics. He frequently drew inspiration from Tibetan literary traditions, incorporating themes related to regional history, cultural identity, and social change. His work is often noted for blending traditional performance practices with contemporary influences. Dubhe contributed to the development of the Dunglen style of music, which reflected and sustained elements of Tibetan cultural expression during a period of social transformation. His influence extended to later Tibetan musicians, including his student Xiedan, who has been described as the "Prince of Tibetan Lute-Singing".

== Notable works ==
Dubhe's works include Hada for Tibet, Sound of Nature, The Heart of a Son of the Snow Land, Me and the Cuckoo, Kelsang Lhamo, Bangjin Meiduo, Dubhe's Latest Dunglen Album, Destiny Lament of the Shepherd, and Lonely Heart.

== Awards ==
- "Silver Wave" award in the amateur category at the "Changfeng Cup Gansu Folk Song Broadcasting Invitation Tournament" (1987)
- Second place in the "Voice of Youth" (1987)
- Lifetime Achievement Award (2017) Qinghai Musicians Association and Tibet Music Network
