= Oula Township, Gansu =

Oula Township 欧拉镇
- Township
- Oulaxiang
- Location in Gansu
- Coordinates: 34°4′48″N 101°43′38″E
- Country: People's Republic of China
- Province: Gansu
- Autonomous prefecture: Gannan Tibetan Autonomous Prefecture
- County: Maqu County

Area
  - Total: 1,389 km^{2} (536 sq mi)

Population (2010)
  - Total: 5,142
  - Density: 3.702/km^{2} (9.588/sq mi)
- Time zone: UTC+8 (China Standard)
- Local dialing code: 941

Oula Township (Chinese: 欧拉镇) is a township in Maqu County, Gannan Tibetan Autonomous Prefecture, Gansu, China. In 2010, Oula Township had a total population of 5,142: 2,772 males and 2,370 females: 1,434 aged under 14, 3,428 aged between 15 and 65 and 280 aged over 65.

== See also ==
- List of township-level divisions of Gansu
