= Rodeo Viejo =

Coordinates: 8.1167°N 81.3167°W

- Corregimiento
- Location within Panama
- Country: Panama
- Province: Veraguas
- District: Soná

Area
  - Land: 122.3 km^{2} (47.2 sq mi)

Population (2010)
  - Total: 2,046
  - Density: 16.7/km^{2} (43/sq mi)
- Population density calculated based on land area.
- Time zone: UTC−5 (EST)

Rodeo Viejo is a corregimiento in Soná District, Veraguas Province, Panama with a population of 2,046 as of 2010. Its population as of 1990 was 2,558; its population as of 2000 was 2,212.
