= Hicaco =

Coordinates: 7°39′N 81°12′W

- Corregimiento
- Interactive map of Hicaco
- Country: Panama
- Provinces: Veraguas
- District: Soná
- Time zone: UTC−5 (EST)

Hicaco is a corregimiento in Veraguas Province in the Republic of Panama.
