= La Soledad, Panama =

Coordinates: 8.1500°N 81.4667°W

La Soledad
- Corregimiento
- Location within Panama
- Country: Panama
- Province: Veraguas
- District: Soná

Area
  - Land: 115.3 km^{2} (44.5 sq mi)

Population (2010)
  - Total: 1,517
  - Density: 13.2/km^{2} (34/sq mi)
- Population density calculated based on land area.
- Time zone: UTC−5 (EST)

La Soledad is a corregimiento in Soná District, Veraguas Province, Panama with a population of 1,517 as of 2010. Its population as of 1990 was 1,589; its population as of 2000 was 1,582.
