= Río Grande, Veraguas =

Coordinates: 7.7192°N 81.3542°W

Río Grande
- Corregimiento
- Location within Panama
- Country: Panama
- Province: Veraguas
- District: Soná

Area
  - Land: 247 km^{2} (95 sq mi)

Population (2010)
  - Total: 3,674
  - Density: 14.9/km^{2} (39/sq mi)
- Population density calculated based on land area.
- Time zone: UTC−5 (EST)

Río Grande is a corregimiento in Soná District, Veraguas Province, Panama with a population of 3,674 as of 2010. Its population as of 1990 was 3,305; its population as of 2000 was 3,317.
