= Bahía Honda, Veraguas =

Coordinates: 7.7509°N 81.5143°W

Bahía Honda
- Corregimiento
- Location within Panama
- Country: Panama
- Province: Veraguas
- District: Soná

Area
  - Land: 175 km^{2} (68 sq mi)

Population (2010)
  - Total: 1,037
  - Density: 5.9/km^{2} (15/sq mi)
- Population density calculated based on land area.
- Time zone: UTC−5 (EST)

Bahía Honda is a corregimiento in Soná District, Veraguas Province, Panama with a population of 1,037 as of 2010. Its population as of 1990 was 1,297; its population as of 2000 was 1,287.
