= Gao County =

Gao County 高县
- County
- Location of the seat in Sichuan
- Coordinates: 28.436°N 104.518°E
- Country: China
- Province: Sichuan
- Prefecture-level city: Yibin
- County seat: Qingfu

Area
  - County: 1,323 km^{2} (511 sq mi)

Population (2019)
  - County: 526,400
  - Density: 397.9/km^{2} (1,031/sq mi)
  - Urban: 171,000
  - Rural: 355,400
- Time zone: UTC+8 (China Standard)
- Website: www.gaoxian.gov.cn

Gao County or Gaoxian (simplified Chinese: 高县; traditional Chinese: 高縣; pinyin: Gāo Xiàn) is a county of Sichuan Province, China. It is under the administration of Yibin city and has a population of 526,400 in 2019, 171,000 of which live in the urban area. The county seat is located 48 km (30 mi) from Yibin city. The county is traversed by the Nanguang River, a tributary of the Yangtze. About half of the land area is covered by forests.

On 20 March 1994, 18 people were killed by a landslide in the east of Gao County.

== Administrative divisions ==
Gao County administers 13 towns:

- Wenjiang 文江镇
- Qingfu 庆符镇
- Shahe 沙河镇
- Jiale 嘉乐镇
- Luochang 罗场镇
- Jiaocun 蕉村镇
- Kejiu 可久镇
- Laifu 来复镇
- Yuejiang 月江镇
- Shengtian 胜天镇
- Fuxing 复兴镇
- Luorun 落润镇
- Qingling 庆岭镇

== Climate ==
Climate data for Gaoxian, elevation 378 m (1,240 ft), (1991–2020 normals, extremes 1981–2010)
Month	Jan	Feb	Mar	Apr	May	Jun	Jul	Aug	Sep	Oct	Nov	Dec	Year
Record high °C (°F)	20.6 (69.1)	24.1 (75.4)	31.4 (88.5)	34.8 (94.6)	38.3 (100.9)	37.2 (99.0)	38.4 (101.1)	41.2 (106.2)	40.1 (104.2)	31.4 (88.5)	26.5 (79.7)	20.7 (69.3)	41.2 (106.2)
Mean daily maximum °C (°F)	11.0 (51.8)	14.0 (57.2)	18.9 (66.0)	24.6 (76.3)	27.9 (82.2)	29.6 (85.3)	32.2 (90.0)	32.1 (89.8)	27.5 (81.5)	22.0 (71.6)	17.9 (64.2)	12.3 (54.1)	22.5 (72.5)
Daily mean °C (°F)	8.0 (46.4)	10.3 (50.5)	14.3 (57.7)	19.2 (66.6)	22.6 (72.7)	24.8 (76.6)	27.0 (80.6)	26.7 (80.1)	23.1 (73.6)	18.5 (65.3)	14.3 (57.7)	9.4 (48.9)	18.2 (64.7)
Mean daily minimum °C (°F)	6.0 (42.8)	7.7 (45.9)	11.1 (52.0)	15.4 (59.7)	18.7 (65.7)	21.4 (70.5)	23.4 (74.1)	23.1 (73.6)	20.3 (68.5)	16.3 (61.3)	12.1 (53.8)	7.5 (45.5)	15.3 (59.4)
Record low °C (°F)	−1.7 (28.9)	0.2 (32.4)	1.7 (35.1)	6.0 (42.8)	10.5 (50.9)	15.5 (59.9)	16.7 (62.1)	16.9 (62.4)	13.8 (56.8)	6.5 (43.7)	2.9 (37.2)	−1.8 (28.8)	−1.8 (28.8)
Average precipitation mm (inches)	16.7 (0.66)	18.0 (0.71)	31.4 (1.24)	59.3 (2.33)	78.8 (3.10)	137.2 (5.40)	190.4 (7.50)	204.1 (8.04)	106.5 (4.19)	59.7 (2.35)	25.1 (0.99)	16.0 (0.63)	943.2 (37.14)
Average precipitation days (≥ 0.1 mm)	13.4	11.2	13.7	13.5	14.7	17.5	15.5	14.3	15.8	18.6	12.8	13.4	174.4
Average snowy days	0.2	0.1	0	0	0	0	0	0	0	0	0	0.1	0.4
Average relative humidity (%)	83	80	77	75	74	80	81	81	83	86	84	84	81
Mean monthly sunshine hours	35.7	48.5	88.6	123.6	126.8	107.5	162.5	167.0	92.4	53.1	55.7	37.8	1,099.2
Percentage possible sunshine	11	15	24	32	30	26	38	41	25	15	17	12	24
Source: China Meteorological Administration
