= Guarumal, Veraguas =

Guarumal
- Corregimiento
- Location within Panama
- Country: Panama
- Province: Veraguas
- District: Soná

Area
  - Land: 324.3 km^{2} (125.2 sq mi)

Population (2010)
  - Total: 3,239
  - Density: 10/km^{2} (26/sq mi)
- Population density calculated based on land area.
- Time zone: UTC−5 (EST)

Guarumal is a corregimiento in Soná District, Veraguas Province, Panama with a population of 3,239 as of 2010. Its population as of 1990 was 3,726; its population as of 2000 was 3,340.

== Climate ==
Climate data for Guarumal
Month	Jan	Feb	Mar	Apr	May	Jun	Jul	Aug	Sep	Oct	Nov	Dec	Year
Record high °C (°F)	37.2 (99.0)	38.2 (100.8)	38.6 (101.5)	38.4 (101.1)	38.8 (101.8)	36.2 (97.2)	35.4 (95.7)	36.0 (96.8)	35.4 (95.7)	34.6 (94.3)	36.4 (97.5)	35.4 (95.7)	38.8 (101.8)
Daily mean °C (°F)	26.6 (79.9)	27.5 (81.5)	28.1 (82.6)	28.3 (82.9)	27.6 (81.7)	27.1 (80.8)	27.0 (80.6)	27.1 (80.8)	26.8 (80.2)	26.5 (79.7)	26.7 (80.1)	26.7 (80.1)	27.2 (80.9)
Record low °C (°F)	13.5 (56.3)	16.0 (60.8)	15.6 (60.1)	16.0 (60.8)	17.2 (63.0)	17.0 (62.6)	17.0 (62.6)	17.0 (62.6)	18.2 (64.8)	17.4 (63.3)	17.0 (62.6)	11.6 (52.9)	11.6 (52.9)
Average rainfall mm (inches)	22.3 (0.88)	16.8 (0.66)	37.5 (1.48)	114.9 (4.52)	365.3 (14.38)	321.0 (12.64)	262.5 (10.33)	337.2 (13.28)	333.1 (13.11)	493.5 (19.43)	342.4 (13.48)	94.9 (3.74)	2,741.4 (107.93)
Source: IMHPA
