= Batang Dua Islands =

Two Indonesian islands in the Maluku Sea

Coordinates: 1°08′50″N 126°15′50″E

The Batang Dua Islands comprise two widely separated islands in the Maluku Sea – Mayau and Tifure – which, together with the uninhabited small islet of Gureda off the coast of Tifure, constitute an administrative district of the city of Ternate, in the North Maluku Province of Indonesia. In all, the islands have a land area of 29.01 km^{2}, and had a total of 2,716 inhabitants in mid 2023. Both islands lie considerably to the west of Ternate Island, and are situated roughly halfway between Ternate Island and North Sulawesi. There are six villages (desa), all of which share the postcode of 97743 and are listed below with their administrative areas and their official estimates of population as at mid 2023.

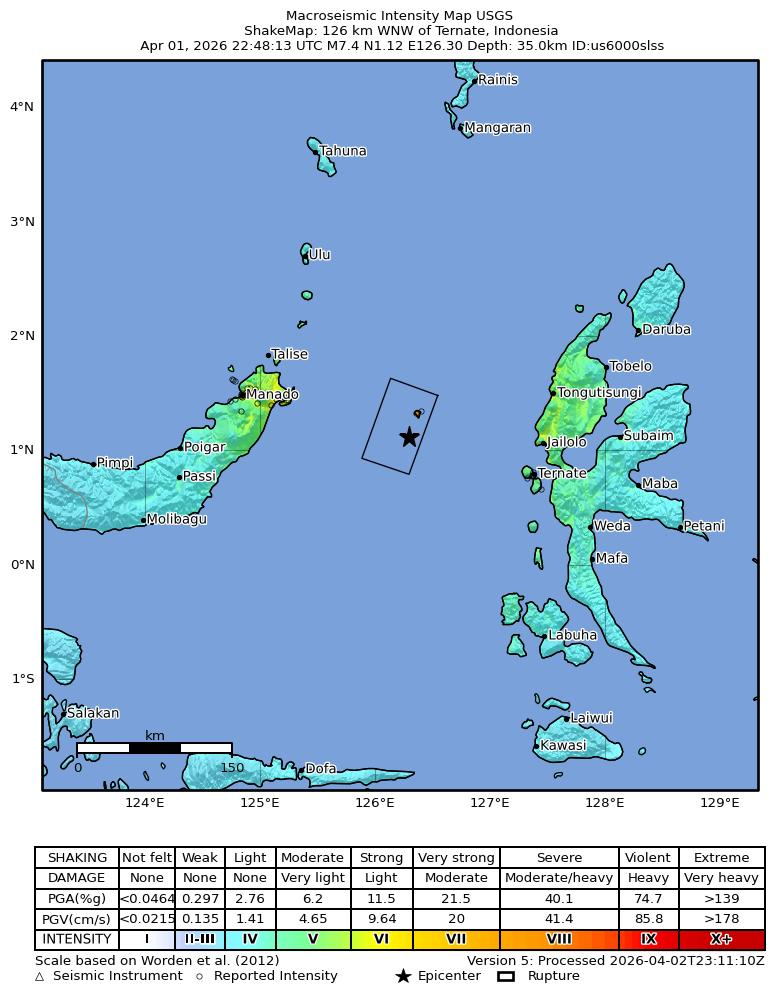
Batang Dua Islands near the epicenter of the 2026 North Maluku earthquake

Name of village (desa)	Area in km^{2}	Pop'n mid 2023 Estimate
Bido	8.78	452
Lelewi	5.72	476
Mayau	9.56	883
Perum Bersatu	0.04	172
Total Mayau Island	24.10	1,991
Tifure	2.74 ^{(a)}	503
Pante Sagu	2.16	222
Total Tifure Island	4.90	725

Note: (a) includes 0.224 km^{2} for the uninhabited offshore island of Gureda.
