= Soná, Panama =

Soná
- Corregimiento
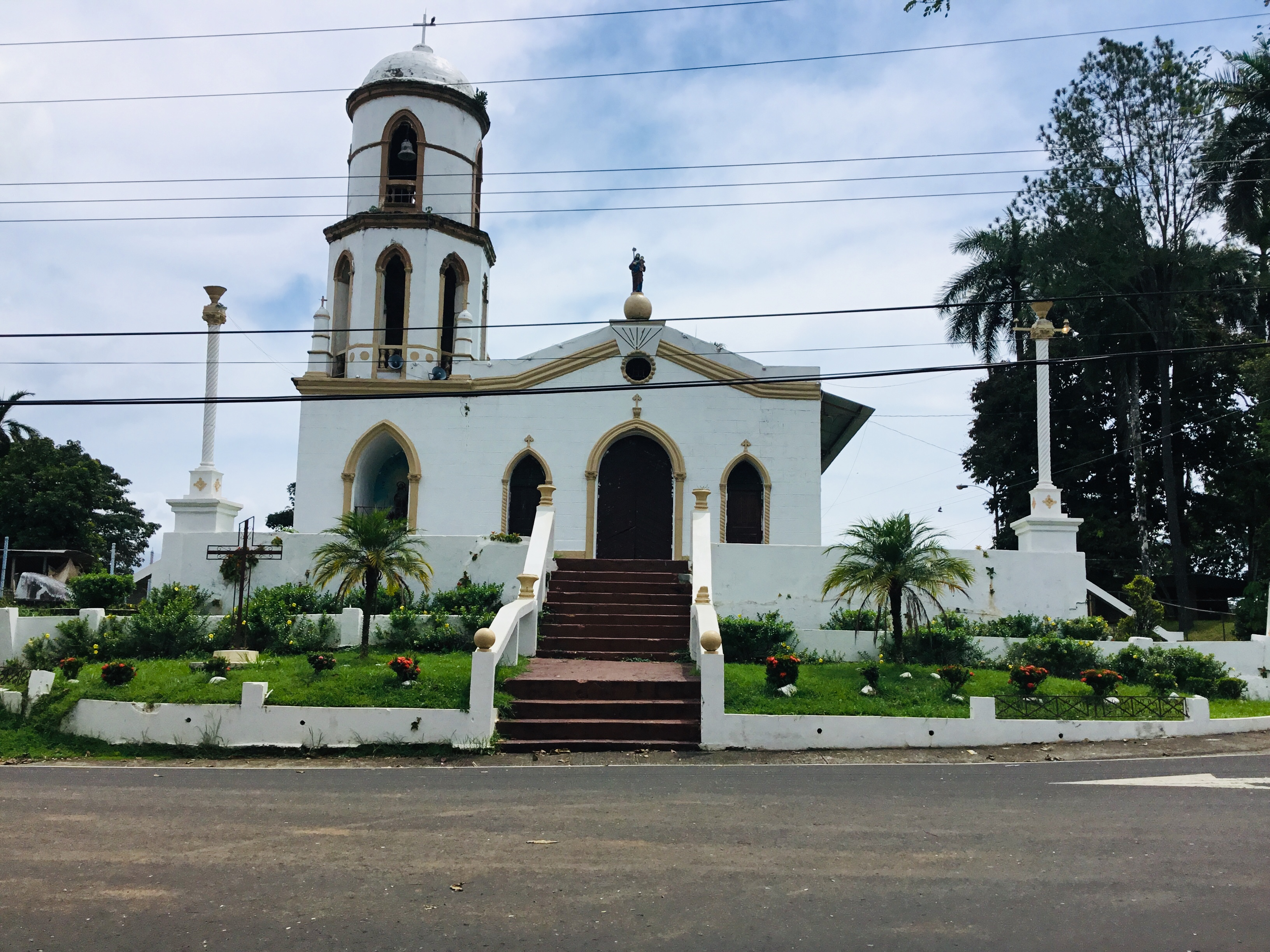
- Church of San José in Soná, 2019

- Location within Panama
- Coordinates: 8°01′N 81°19′W
- Country: Panama
- Province: Veraguas
- District: Soná

Area
  - Land: 70.1 km^{2} (27.1 sq mi)

Population (2010)
  - Total: 10,802
  - Density: 154/km^{2} (400/sq mi)
- Population density calculated based on land area.
- Time zone: UTC−5 (EST)

Soná is a corregimiento in Soná District, Veraguas Province, Panama with a population of 10,802 as of 2010. It is the seat of Soná District. Its population as of 1990 was 9,094; its population as of 2000 was 10,104.

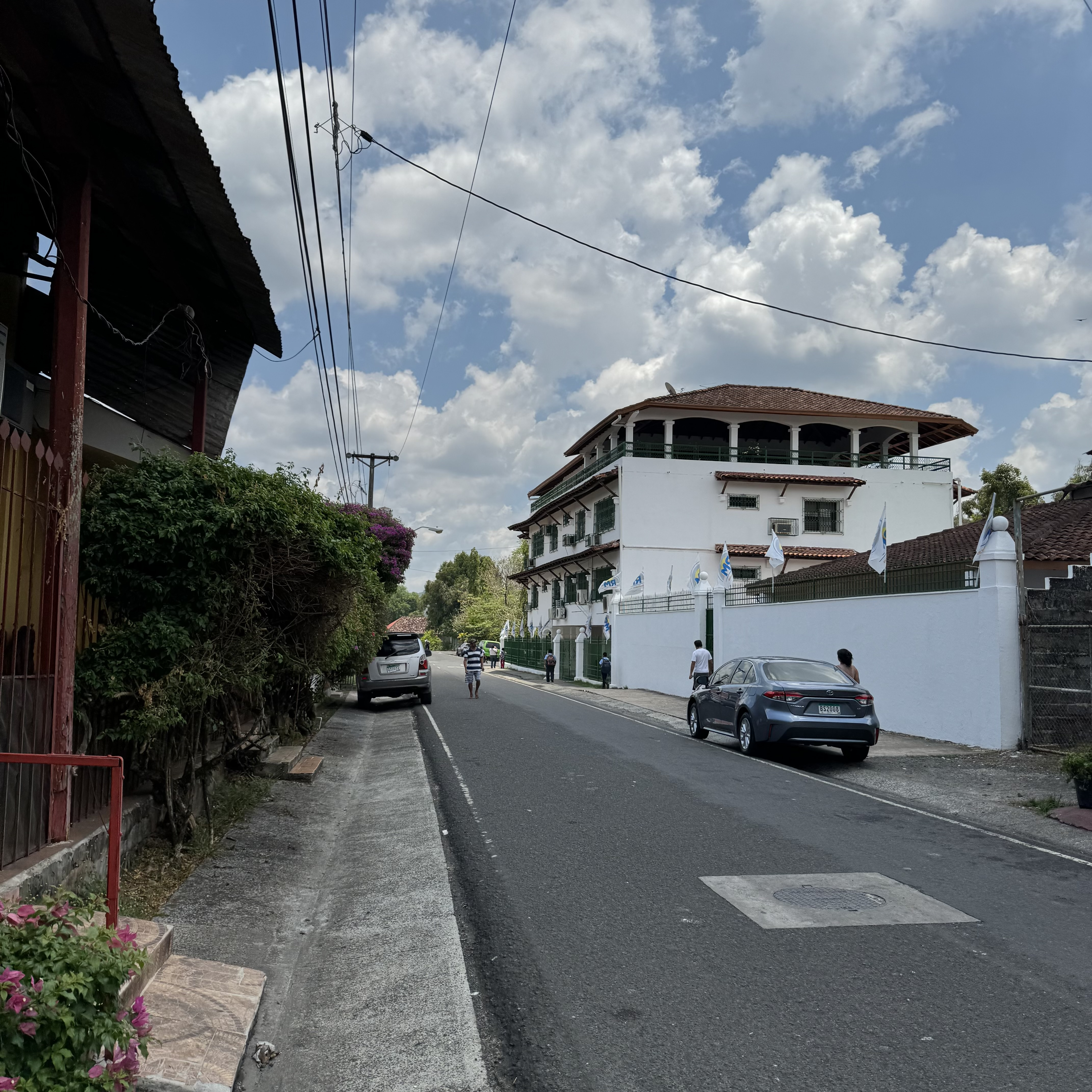
Soná, 2024
