= Maqu County =

Maqu County རྨ་ཆུ་རྫོང་། · 玛曲县
- County
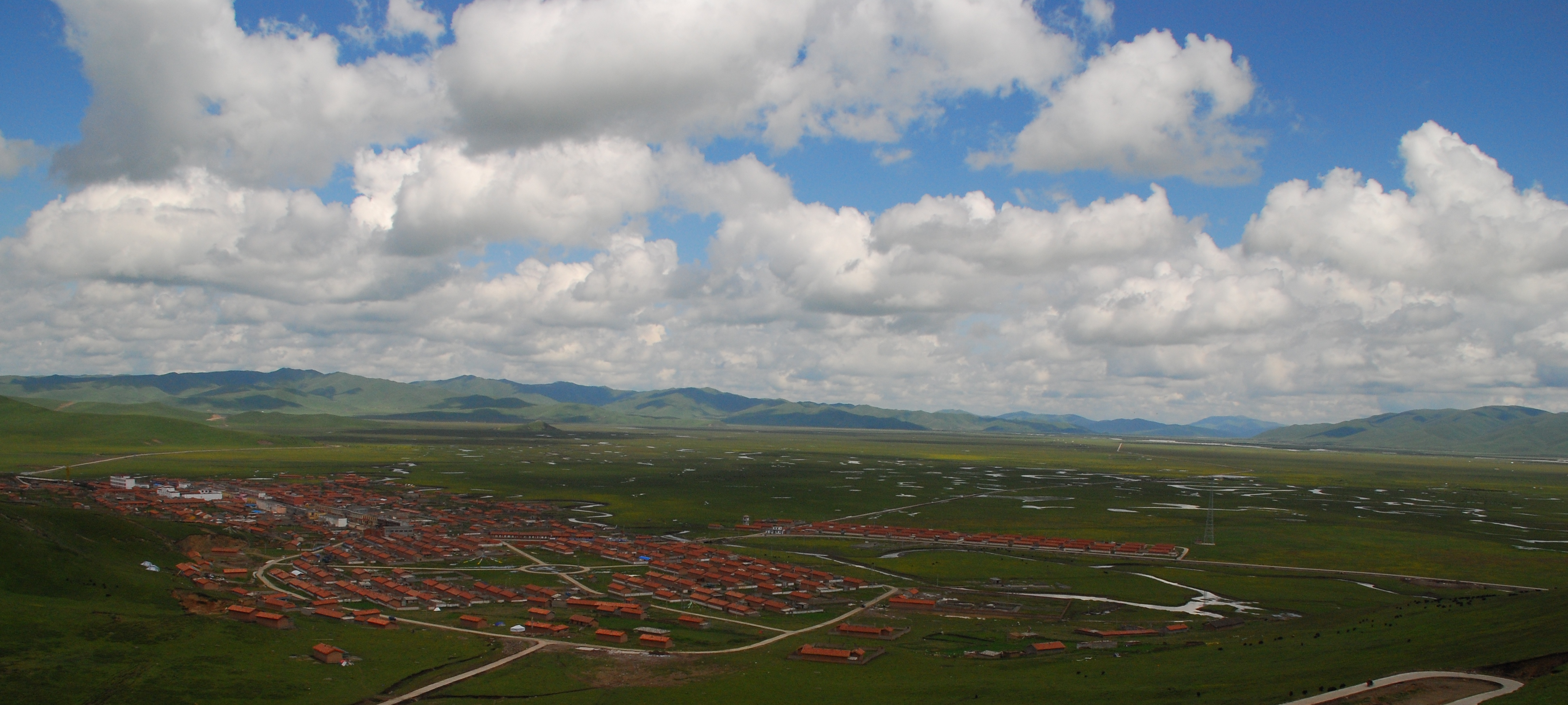

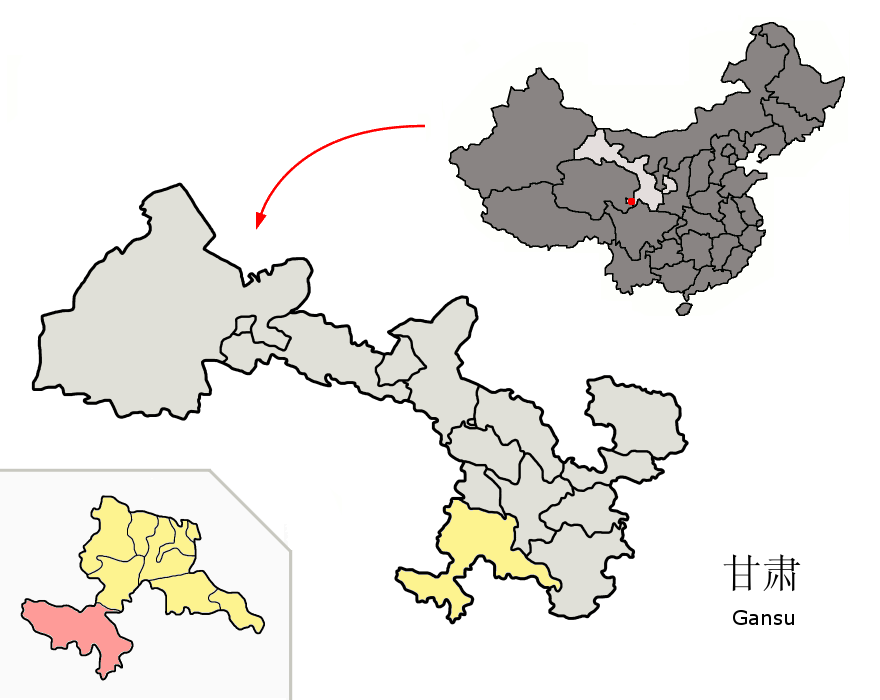
- Maqu County (red) within Gannan Prefecture (yellow) and Gansu

- Location of the seat in Gansu Maqu (China)
- Coordinates (Maqu government): 33°59′52″N 102°04′22″E
- Country: China
- Province: Gansu
- Autonomous prefecture: Gannan
- County seat: Nyinma (Nima)

Area
  - Total: 10,190 km^{2} (3,930 sq mi)

Population (2020)
  - Total: 57,076
  - Density: 5.601/km^{2} (14.51/sq mi)
- Time zone: UTC+8 (China Standard)
- Postal code: 747300
- Website: www.maqu.gov.cn

Maqu County

Chinese name
- Simplified Chinese: 玛曲县
- Traditional Chinese: 瑪曲縣
Transcriptions
Standard Mandarin
- Hanyu Pinyin: Mǎqū Xiàn

Tibetan name
- Tibetan: རྨ་ཆུ་རྫོང་།
Transcriptions
- Wylie: rma chu rdzong
- Tibetan Pinyin: Maqu Zong

Maqu County (Chinese: 玛曲县; Tibetan: རྨ་ཆུ་རྫོང་།) is a county of the Gannan Tibetan Autonomous Prefecture in the south of Gansu province of China, bordering the provinces of Sichuan to the east and southeast, and Qinghai to the southwest, west and northwest. Its postal code is 747300, and in 1999 its population was 36,213 people. The word "Maqu" derived from the Tibetan name of Yellow River. The area of Maqu County is 10,191 km2 with an average altitude of 3,700 meters. Maqu County receives high rainfall and is located at the northern edge of the Zoigê Marshes on the Yellow River where conditions are optimal for alpine meadow vegetation.

== Administrative divisions ==
Maqu County is divided to 6 towns and 2 townships.

Name	Simplified Chinese	Hanyu Pinyin	Tibetan	Wylie	Administrative division code
Towns
Nyinma Town (Nima)	尼玛镇	Nímǎ Zhèn	ཉིན་མ་གྲོང་རྡལ།	nyin ma grong rdal	623025100
Maima Town (Manrima)	曼日玛镇	Mànrìmǎ Zhèn	སྨད་མ་གྲོང་རྡལ།	smad ma grong rdal	623025101
Waibaincang Town (Bainaincang, Awancang)	阿万仓镇	Āwàncāng Zhèn	དབལ་བན་ཚང་གྲོང་རྡལ།	dbal ban tshang grong rdal	623025102
Qukama Town (Qihama)	齐哈玛镇	Qíhāmǎ Zhèn	ཆུ་ཁ་མ་གྲོང་རྡལ།	chu kha ma grong rdal	623025103
Cêruma Town (Cairima)	采日玛镇	Cǎirìmǎ Zhèn	མཚེ་རུ་མ་གྲོང་རྡལ།	mtshe ru ma grong rdal	623025104
Ngüra Town (Oula)	欧拉镇	Ōulā Zhèn	དངུལ་རྭ་གྲོང་རྡལ།	dngul rwa grong rdal	623025105
Townships
Ngüraxoima Township (Oulaxiuma)	欧拉秀玛乡	Ōulāxiùmǎ Xiāng	དངུལ་རྭ་ཞོལ་མ་ཤང་།	dngul rwa zhol ma shang	623025201
Murqêg Township (Murqê, Muxihe)	木西合乡	Mùxīhé Xiāng	མུར་བྱེག་ཤང་།	mur byeg shang	623025203

== Climate ==
Climate data for Maqu, elevation 3,471 m (11,388 ft), (1991–2020 normals, extremes 1981–present)
Month	Jan	Feb	Mar	Apr	May	Jun	Jul	Aug	Sep	Oct	Nov	Dec	Year
Record high °C (°F)	14.5 (58.1)	14.8 (58.6)	18.4 (65.1)	23.6 (74.5)	22.4 (72.3)	23.4 (74.1)	25.1 (77.2)	24.7 (76.5)	23.5 (74.3)	19.8 (67.6)	17.2 (63.0)	13.6 (56.5)	25.1 (77.2)
Mean daily maximum °C (°F)	0.5 (32.9)	3.2 (37.8)	6.4 (43.5)	10.3 (50.5)	13.0 (55.4)	15.2 (59.4)	17.6 (63.7)	17.5 (63.5)	14.3 (57.7)	9.5 (49.1)	5.3 (41.5)	1.5 (34.7)	9.5 (49.1)
Daily mean °C (°F)	−8.3 (17.1)	−5.3 (22.5)	−1.3 (29.7)	3.0 (37.4)	6.4 (43.5)	9.7 (49.5)	11.8 (53.2)	11.3 (52.3)	8.0 (46.4)	2.7 (36.9)	−2.9 (26.8)	−7.2 (19.0)	2.3 (36.2)
Mean daily minimum °C (°F)	−15.4 (4.3)	−12.2 (10.0)	−7.2 (19.0)	−2.7 (27.1)	1.1 (34.0)	4.9 (40.8)	6.8 (44.2)	6.2 (43.2)	3.4 (38.1)	−2.0 (28.4)	−8.8 (16.2)	−14.1 (6.6)	−3.3 (26.0)
Record low °C (°F)	−28.0 (−18.4)	−27.3 (−17.1)	−20.9 (−5.6)	−13.6 (7.5)	−8.9 (16.0)	−3.4 (25.9)	−2.7 (27.1)	−4.0 (24.8)	−7.0 (19.4)	−12.9 (8.8)	−22.4 (−8.3)	−26.8 (−16.2)	−28.0 (−18.4)
Average precipitation mm (inches)	5.8 (0.23)	6.3 (0.25)	15.2 (0.60)	29.0 (1.14)	71.8 (2.83)	101.0 (3.98)	126.0 (4.96)	116.9 (4.60)	88.1 (3.47)	43.7 (1.72)	6.7 (0.26)	1.8 (0.07)	612.3 (24.11)
Average precipitation days (≥ 0.1 mm)	4.9	5.3	9.6	12.3	17.8	19.8	19.3	17.9	18.5	14.5	4.1	2.6	146.6
Average snowy days	6.5	7.4	12.9	12.6	7.7	1.3	0.2	0.1	2.0	10.3	6.0	4.2	71.2
Average relative humidity (%)	45	46	52	58	66	71	74	75	76	70	55	46	61
Mean monthly sunshine hours	229.4	207.9	228.5	230.1	219.3	186.9	217.6	219.9	173.7	195.8	229.1	234.1	2,572.3
Percentage possible sunshine	72	67	61	59	51	43	50	54	48	57	74	77	59
Source: China Meteorological Administration all-time Nov high

== See also ==
- List of administrative divisions of Gansu
