= Oulaxiuma Township, Gansu =

Oulaxiuma Township 欧拉秀玛乡
- Township
- Oulaxiumaxiang
- Location in Gansu
- Coordinates: 34°14′31″N 101°7′17″E
- Country: People's Republic of China
- Province: Gansu
- Autonomous prefecture: Gannan Tibetan Autonomous Prefecture
- County: Maqu County

Area
  - Total: 1,427 km^{2} (551 sq mi)

Population (2010)
  - Total: 3,183
  - Density: 2.231/km^{2} (5.777/sq mi)
- Time zone: UTC+8 (China Standard)
- Local dialing code: 941

Oulaxiuma Township (Chinese: 欧拉秀玛乡) is a township in Maqu County, Gannan Tibetan Autonomous Prefecture, Gansu, China. In 2010, Oulaxiuma Township had a total population of 3,183: 1,642 males and 1,541 females: 1,025 aged under 14, 2,009 aged between 15 and 65 and 149 aged over 65.

== See also ==
- List of township-level divisions of Gansu
