= Soná District =

- District

- Location of the district capital in Panama
- Coordinates: 7°55′N 81°20′W
- Country: Panama
- Province: Veraguas Province
- Capital: Soná

Area
  - Total: 586 sq mi (1,519 km^{2})

Population (2019)
  - Total: 29,774
  - Density: 50.77/sq mi (19.60/km^{2})
- official estimate
- Time zone: UTC-5 (ETZ)

Soná District is a district (distrito) of Veraguas Province in Panama. The population according to the 2010 Panamanian census was 27,833; the latest official estimate (for 2019) is 29,774. The district covers a total area of 1,519 km^{2} (586 sq mi). The capital lies at the city of Soná.

It also hosts the Soná Football Club 1835.

The mayor of the city is Aristides Ortiz Arosemena.

The city is referenced in Prison Break based on a local urban legend of an "underground prison".

== Administrative divisions ==
Soná District is divided administratively into the following corregimientos:

- Soná
- Bahía Honda
- Calidonia
- Cativé
- El Marañón
- Guarumal
- La Soledad
- Quebrada de Oro
- Río Grande
- Rodeo Viejo
- Hicaco
- La Trinchera
