= Jurm District =

Jurm جرم
- District
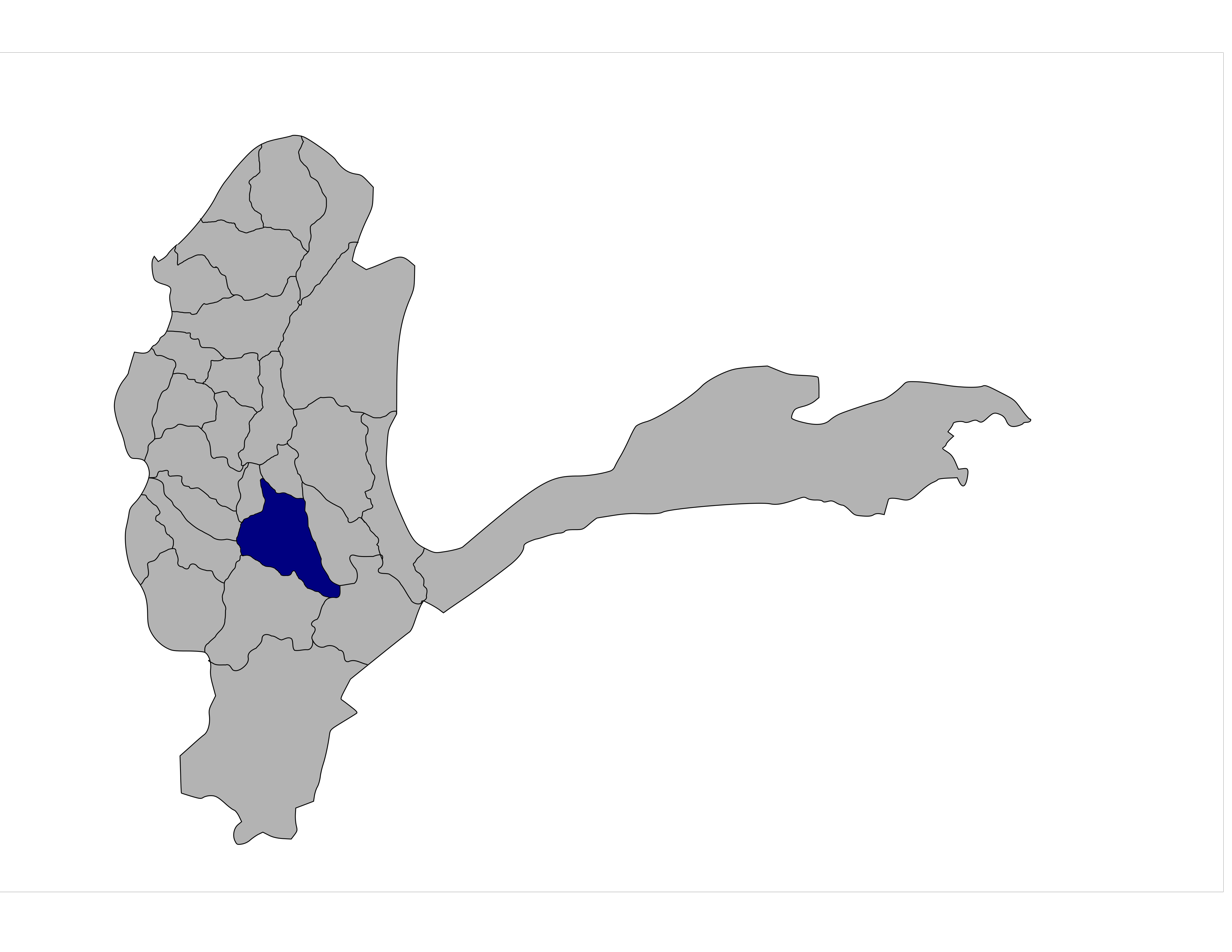
- Location of Jurm District in Badakhshan Province

- Location in Afghanistan
- Coordinates: 36°45′N 70°54′E
- Country: Afghanistan
- Province: Badakhshan
- Capital: Jorm

Government
  - Type: District council

Population
  - Estimate (2019): 42,671

Jurm District (Dari: جرم) is one of the 28 districts of Badakhshan province in northeastern Afghanistan. The district capital is the town of Jorm. The district is 3 hours from the center of the province in Fayzabad, and is home to approximately 42,700 residents. The highest point of the Afghan Hindu Kush is located in Jurm District, at 6,729 meters. The district consists of population clusters and villages. Ferghamenj, Kyb, Kyteb, Ularyb, Ferghameru, Khustak, and Iskan are the clusters. Each cluster contain villages; the district is largely Tajik speaking.
