= Jurm, Afghanistan =

Jurm جرم Jorm
- Village
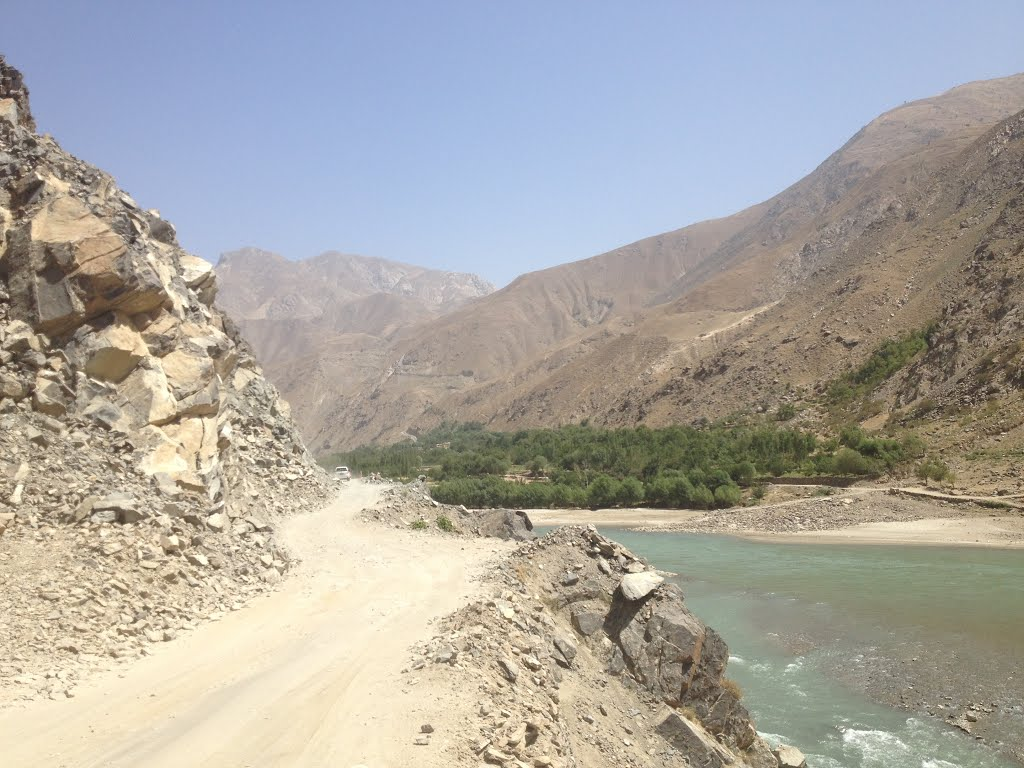
- Fayzabad-Baharak Road in Jurm.

- Location in Afghanistan
- Coordinates: 36°52′0″N 70°50′4″E
- Country: Afghanistan
- Province: Badakhshan
- District: Jurm
- Elevation: 4,800 ft (1,500 m)
- Time zone: + 4.30

Jurm (also spelled Jorm; Dari: جرم) is a village in Badakhshan province in northeastern Afghanistan. The village is located on the left bank of the Kokcha River, about 7 miles upstream the junction with the Warduj River. Around the turn of the 20th century, it was described as being a large collection of scattered hamlets, with a population of at least 400 families, possibly much more.

The name Jorm is said to be derived from the fine Timur Lang imposed on the villagers for an attack on his troops. The village proper lies on the left bank of the river, but its associated hamlets run 3 miles up and downstream from there on both banks. There was a large, ruined fort about half a mile south of the village proper where the hakim of Jurm resided. He commanded the Yamgan-Warduj and Barak sub-districts.

Huts for those who graze their livestock can be found on both sides of the river up and down stream of Jurm. The location is highly regarded for its fruit and other vegetation, as well as for its fields and pastures. There was also a bazaar held there twice weekly, which specialized in whips.

Around the turn of the 20th century, there was a wooden bridge crossing the river at Jurm.

== Climate ==
Jorm has a hot-summer humid continental climate (Köppen: Dsa) with hot, dry summers and cold, snowy winters.

Climate data for Jorm, Badakhshan Province
Month	Jan	Feb	Mar	Apr	May	Jun	Jul	Aug	Sep	Oct	Nov	Dec	Year
Daily mean °C (°F)	−3.9 (25.0)	−1.9 (28.6)	3.5 (38.3)	10.2 (50.4)	14.2 (57.6)	19.3 (66.7)	22.5 (72.5)	22.1 (71.8)	17.4 (63.3)	11.5 (52.7)	5.1 (41.2)	−0.5 (31.1)	10.0 (49.9)
Average precipitation mm (inches)	53.6 (2.11)	72.3 (2.85)	102.6 (4.04)	97.2 (3.83)	67.4 (2.65)	10.2 (0.40)	5.3 (0.21)	1.6 (0.06)	2.6 (0.10)	25.6 (1.01)	33.3 (1.31)	47.8 (1.88)	519.5 (20.45)
Average relative humidity (%)	66.7	66.6	63.3	61.0	55.3	40.5	35.8	36.8	38.8	45.6	53.4	61.3	52.1
Source: Weatherbase
