= Boca =

Boca or BOCA may refer to:

== Entertainment ==
- Boca, a 1994 film starring Rae Dawn Chong
- Boca (2010 film), a 2010 Brazilian film
- "Boca" (The Sopranos episode), a 1999 episode of the American television series The Sopranos
- "Boca", a song by Dreamcatcher from Dystopia: Lose Myself (2020)
- "Boca" (Gaia and Sean Paul song), a single by Gaia and Sean Paul from Alma (2021)

== Locations ==
- La Boca, a neighbourhood of Buenos Aires, Argentina
  - La Boca Formation, a geological formation in Mexico
- Boca, California, a former settlement
- Boca, a village in Samarinești Commune, Gorj County, Romania
- Boca Chica, a municipality of the Santo Domingo province in the Dominican Republic
  - Boca Chica Key, an island in the lower Florida Keys
  - Boca Chica (disambiguation), several places
- Boca, Novara, a municipality in the Province of Novara, Italy
- Boca de Tomatlán, a village in Jalisco, Mexico
- Boca Del Mar, Florida, a census-designated place in Palm Beach County, Florida
- Boca del Río, Veracruz, a city in the Mexican state of Veracruz
- Boca Grande, Florida, a town on Gasparilla Island, Florida
- Boca grande (disambiguation), several places
- Boca Pointe, Florida, a census-designated place in Palm Beach County, Florida
- Boca Raton, Florida, a city in Palm Beach County, Florida
  - Boca Raton (disambiguation), several places
- Several straits separating Trinidad and Tobago from the South American mainland:
  - The Bocas del Dragón (consisting of the Boca Grande, Boca de Navios, Boca de Huevos, and Boca de Monos)
  - The Boca del Serpiente or Columbus Channel
  - The Bocas Islands, which lie in the Bocas del Dragón
- Boca (river), a tributary of the Siret in eastern Romania
- La Boca, New Mexico, a census-designated place

== People ==
- Andrea Del Boca, an Argentine television actress
- Carlos Bocanegra, nicknamed 'Boca', an American soccer player

== Sports ==
- Boca Juniors, a sports club based in La Boca neighborhood of Buenos Aires, Argentina
- Boca Unidos, a sports club based in Corrientes, Argentina
- Boca F.C., a defunct football team from Belize
- A.S.D. Boca Pietri, a football team from Bologna, Italy
- Boca Ascesa Val Liona, a football team from Grancona, Italy
- Sociedade Boca Júnior Futebol Clube, a football club based in Cristinápolis, Sergipe, Brazil

== Media ==
- Boca (magazine), American magazine

== Other uses ==
- Boston Cognitive Assessment
- Bird Observation & Conservation Australia, the former Bird Observers Club of Australia
- Bloque Obrero Comunista de Andalucía, an Andalusian Communist group
- Boca Burger, an American brand of vegetarian hamburger
- Bureau of Consular Affairs (Republic of China), a government agency in Taiwan
- BOCA National Property Maintenance Code, a publication created by the Building Officials Code Administrators International (BOCA). See International Building Code
- Boca Research, a defunct modem manufacturer
- Boulevard Oaks Civic Association, for the neighborhood of Boulevard Oaks, Houston, Texas

== See also ==
- Boca Chica (disambiguation) (Small Boca; Spanish: small mouth)
- Boca grande (disambiguation) (Large Boca; Spanish: large mouth)
