= Boca Chica (disambiguation) =

Boca Chica is a municipality in the Dominican Republic.

Boca Chica or Bocachica or variation, may also refer to:

== Places ==
- Boca Chica, Chiriquí, a village in Panama, on the Gulf of Chiriqui
- Boca Chica Island, in the Gulf of Chiriqui; an island of Panama
- Boca Chica Key, an island in the Florida Keys, of Florida, USA
  - Boca Chica Field at Naval Air Station Key West
  - Boca Chica Beach, on Boca Chica Key
  - Boca Chica Road, on the Overseas Highway
- Boca Chica (Texas), a peninsula in the state of Texas, USA
  - Boca Chica Beach, a beach on the peninsula
  - Boca Chica Village, Texas, a former village near Boca Chica Beach
  - Texas State Highway 4, known locally as Boca Chica Boulevard
  - SpaceX South Texas launch site, part of the Boca Chica Spaceport
  - SpaceX Boca Chica resort, a resort in planning stage near Boca Chica Beach
- Port of Boca Chica, Boca Chica, Dominican Republic
- Bocachica channel, Cartagena Bay, Cartagena, Colombia

== People ==
- César Bocachica (born 1938), Puerto Rican basketball player
- Hiram Bocachica (born 1976), Puerto Rican baseball player

== Other uses ==
- Several forts and batteries in Columbia; see List of National Monuments of Colombia

== See also ==
- Castle of San Luis de Bocachica, Cartagena, Colombia
- Boca grande (disambiguation) (Spanish: Big Mouth); "Boca Chica" means 'small mouth' in Spanish
- Chico (disambiguation)
- Chica (disambiguation)
- Boca (disambiguation)
