= Boca grande =

Boca grande is Spanish for big mouth. It may also refer to:

== Places ==
- Bocagrande, Cartagena de Indias, Bolívar, Colombia
- Bocagrande channel, Cartagena Bay, Cartagena, Colombia
- Boca Grande, Florida, United States
- Boca Grande, Venezuela
- Boca Grande Key, Florida, United States

== Other ==
- Boca Grande Community Center, also known as Boca Grande School, a historic site in Boca Grande, Florida
- Boca Grande Quarantine Station, a historic site in Boca Grande, Florida
- Boca Grande Taqueria, a restaurant in Boston, Massachusetts
- Port Boca Grande Light, part of the Gasparilla Island Lights in Boca Grande, Florida

== See also ==
- Boca Chica (disambiguation) (Spanish: small mouth)
- Grande (disambiguation)
- Boca (disambiguation)
