= Isla Palenque =

Island in Chiriquí Province, Panama

Coordinates: 8°10′50″N 82°15′10″W

Isla Palenque is located off the western Pacific shore of Panama, near the border of Costa Rica, in the Gulf of Chiriquí. Isla Boca Brava is just to the north, connected to Isla Palenque by a tombolo. The island is approximately 400 acres (1.6 km^{2}), with 5 miles (8.0 km) of coastline and over 1-mile (1.6 km) of beaches. Most of the island is covered with mature tropical forest; other ecosystems on the island include mangroves, lagoons, and littoral forest.

== History ==
A palenque originally referred to a refuge for escaped slaves. During Central America’s colonial period, indigenous Indians were indentured to work in the Spanish mines. Those who escaped sought sanctuary in places they fortified with palisades, or palenques. Isla Palenque has been called by that name for as long as maps can determine, and so may have been used to harbor escapees during the colonial period, or possibly as a refuge even earlier.

According to research by Olga F. Linares, Isla Palenque has been a privileged location from the start of human settlement, and was the home of an ancient, pre-Columbian farming community some time during the years 500-1400AD. It may even have been occupied as long ago as 5,000BC. It became a sacred site for the most holy of ceremonies, and tribes from all over the province came here to worship. Important tribal chiefs were known to negotiate and trade with each other, making this the province’s prime center of culture and commerce. By colonial times this ancient community had vanished, leaving only enough clues about their lives to awaken curiosity and provide a sense of the island's ancient history.

Construction of a high-end eco-resort began in 2010 and it opened its first rooms in early 2012.

== Flora and fauna ==
Due to its highly varied terrain and multiple ecosystems, there is a wide variety of flora and fauna on Isla Palenque.

At least eight families of howler monkeys have been identified.

Other mammals identified on the island include the northern tamandua anteater, the nine-banded armadillo, white-nosed coati, crab-eating raccoon, agouti, woolly opossum, and the Mexican hairy dwarf porcupine, in addition to various kinds rabbits, squirrels and mice. While researchers have not yet spotted a margay, evidence exists in trees and pawprints.

Large reptiles on the island include the emerald basilisk, black ctenosaur, green iguana, and spectacled caiman. In addition, multiple species of frogs, salamander, lizards and snakes exist on the island in varying quantities.

A wide variety of tropical birds also use the island as a home or stopping point during migrations. toucans, parrots, woodpeckers, frigatebirds, hawks, and owls have all been spotted on the island, along with multiple varieties of hummingbirds.

== Climate ==
Isla Palenque's temperatures are fairly consistent year round, with 90 degree highs during the day and 70 degree temperatures at night. Isla Palenque, like most of Panama, has a rainy season from May through November and a dry season from December through April. During most of the rainy season, afternoon rains of a few hours are typical; it is only in October and November that the rains regularly become extended deluges.

== See also ==
- Gulf of Chiriquí National Marine Park
