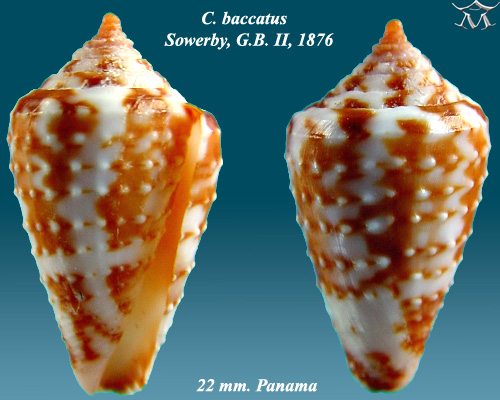
- Apertural and abapertural views of shell of Conasprella baccata Sowerby, G.B. III, 1876
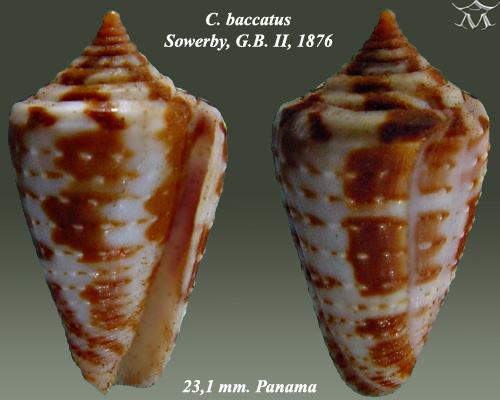

Conservation status
- Least Concern (IUCN 3.1)

Scientific classification
- Kingdom: Animalia
- Phylum: Mollusca
- Class: Gastropoda
- Subclass: Caenogastropoda
- Order: Neogastropoda
- Superfamily: Conoidea
- Family: Conidae
- Genus: Conasprella
- Species: C. baccata

Binomial name
- Conasprella baccata (G. B. Sowerby III, 1877)

Synonyms
- Conasprella (Ximeniconus) baccata (G. B. Sowerby III, 1877) · accepted, alternate representation; Conus baccatus G. B. Sowerby III, 1877; Globiconus baccatus (G. B. Sowerby III, 1877) · accepted, alternate representation; Perplexiconus baccatus (G. B. Sowerby III, 1877)

= Conasprella baccata =

Species of gastropod

Conasprella baccata is a species of sea snail, a marine gastropod mollusk in the family Conidae, the cone snails and their allies.

Like all species within the genus Conasprella, these snails are predatory and venomous. They are capable of stinging humans, therefore live ones should be handled carefully or not at all.

== Description ==
The normal length of this marine species is between 15 and 25 mm. The body whorl is conical in shape. The spire is low, concave in profil. Sutural ramps are flat in cross section. The protoconch is relatively swollen and brown colored.

== Distribution ==
Pacific Panama. Type locality not stated but designated as off Isla Parida, Golfo de Chiriqui, Panama.
