= Boca Raton (disambiguation) =

Boca Raton is a city in Florida, United States.

Boca Raton may also refer to these places or organizations within the city:

- Boca Raton Resort, a club and former Ritz-Carlton resort
- Boca Raton Airport (BCT, KBCT)
- Boca Raton Army Airfield
- Boca Raton (Tri-Rail station)
- Boca Raton Florida East Coast Railway Station
- Boca Raton Rugby Football Club
- Boca Raton Community High School
- Lynn University, formerly known as the College of Boca Raton

== See also ==
- Boca (disambiguation)
- Raton (disambiguation)
