= El Ratón =

El Ratón (Spanish for "The Mouse") or Ratón may refer to:

== People with the nickname ==
- Hell Raton (born 1990), formerly El Raton, Italian rapper with Ecuadorian origins
- Roberto Ayala (born 1973), Argentine footballer
- Raúl Macías (1934–2009), Mexican boxer and actor
- Ramón Rodríguez (footballer) (born 1977), Peruvian footballer
- Ovidio Guzmán López (born 1990), Sinaloa Cartel member and son of Joaquín "El Chapo" Guzmán

== Other uses ==
- Ratón, "el terrible Ratón," a Spanish bull which has killed three bullfighters since 2001
- El Ratón (film), a 1957 Mexican film
- El Raton (song), a 1974 song by Cheo Feliciano

== See also ==
- Raton (disambiguation)
- Ratoncito Pérez, "El Ratón de los Dientes" - the tooth fairy
