= Boca Chica Island =

Island in Panama

Coordinates: 8.26605°N 82.2916°W

Boca Chica Island, also known as "Isla de Muertos" (Island of the Dead) is located off the Pacific coast of Panama in the Gulf of Chiriquí, specifically in the Bahia de Muertos. Supposedly the island was a sacred burial grounds of one of the indigenous groups of Panama.

Approximately 6 miles from the town of Boca Chica, it is one of the few islands in the region covered in primary rainforest. The island's coastline is approximately 8.2 kilometers.
