= Raton =

Raton or Ratón (Spanish for "mouse") may refer to:

== Places ==
- Raton Basin, a geologic structural basin in southern Colorado and northern New Mexico
- Raton, New Mexico, the county seat of Colfax County, New Mexico
  - Raton Downtown Historic District, a Registered Historic District in Raton, New Mexico
- Raton Pass, a mountain pass that is a National Historic Landmark
- Ráton, the Hungarian name for Ratin village Crasna, Sălaj, Romania

== Other uses ==
- Ratón (2001-2013), a Spanish fighting bull
- USS Raton (SS-270), a submarine
- Raton, the French name of a character in Fontaine's fable The Monkey and the Cat

== See also ==
- El Ratón (disambiguation)
