= Boca Grande Bike Path =

Multi-use path in Boca Grande, Florida on Gasparilla Island

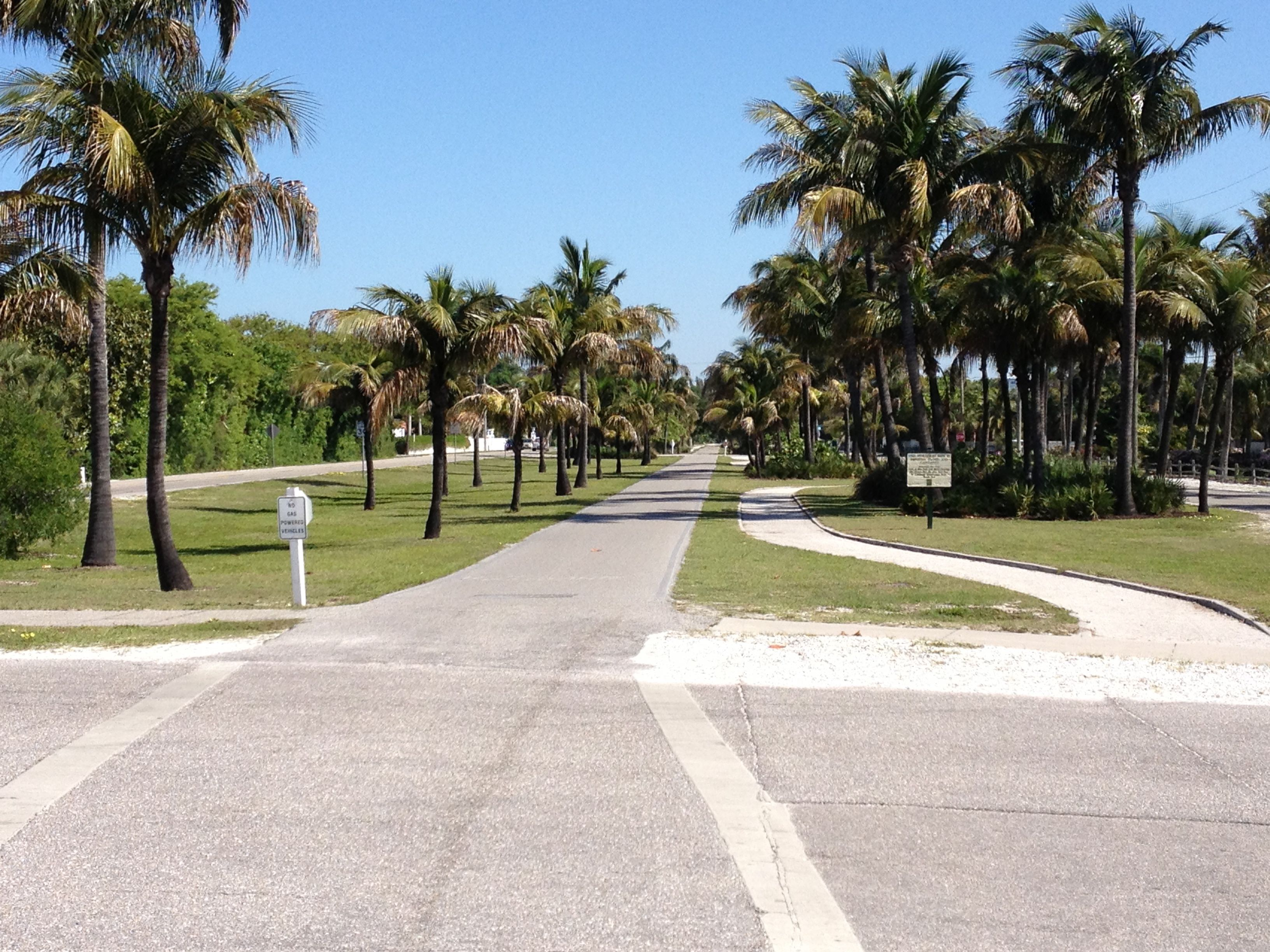
- Length: 6.5 mi (10.5 km)
- Location: Boca Grande, Florida, United States
- Trailheads: North: 26.8026°N 82.2754°W; Behind the property at 5800 Gasparilla Road; South: 26.7196°N 82.2613°W; Belcher Road and Gulf Boulevard
- Season: Year round
- Surface: Asphalt
- Right of way: Charlotte Harbor and Northern Railway

The Boca Grande Bike Path is a 6.5 mile multi-use path in Boca Grande, Florida on Gasparilla Island. The northern portion of the path runs on the former right of way of the Charlotte Harbor and Northern Railway, which operated on Gasparilla Island from 1907 to 1981. As Florida's first rail trail, it was repurposed principally for bicycles, but pedestrians also use it. Golf carts are also permitted on the path. Another trail exists on the mainland portion of the railroad line known as the Cape Haze Pioneer Trail.

== History ==
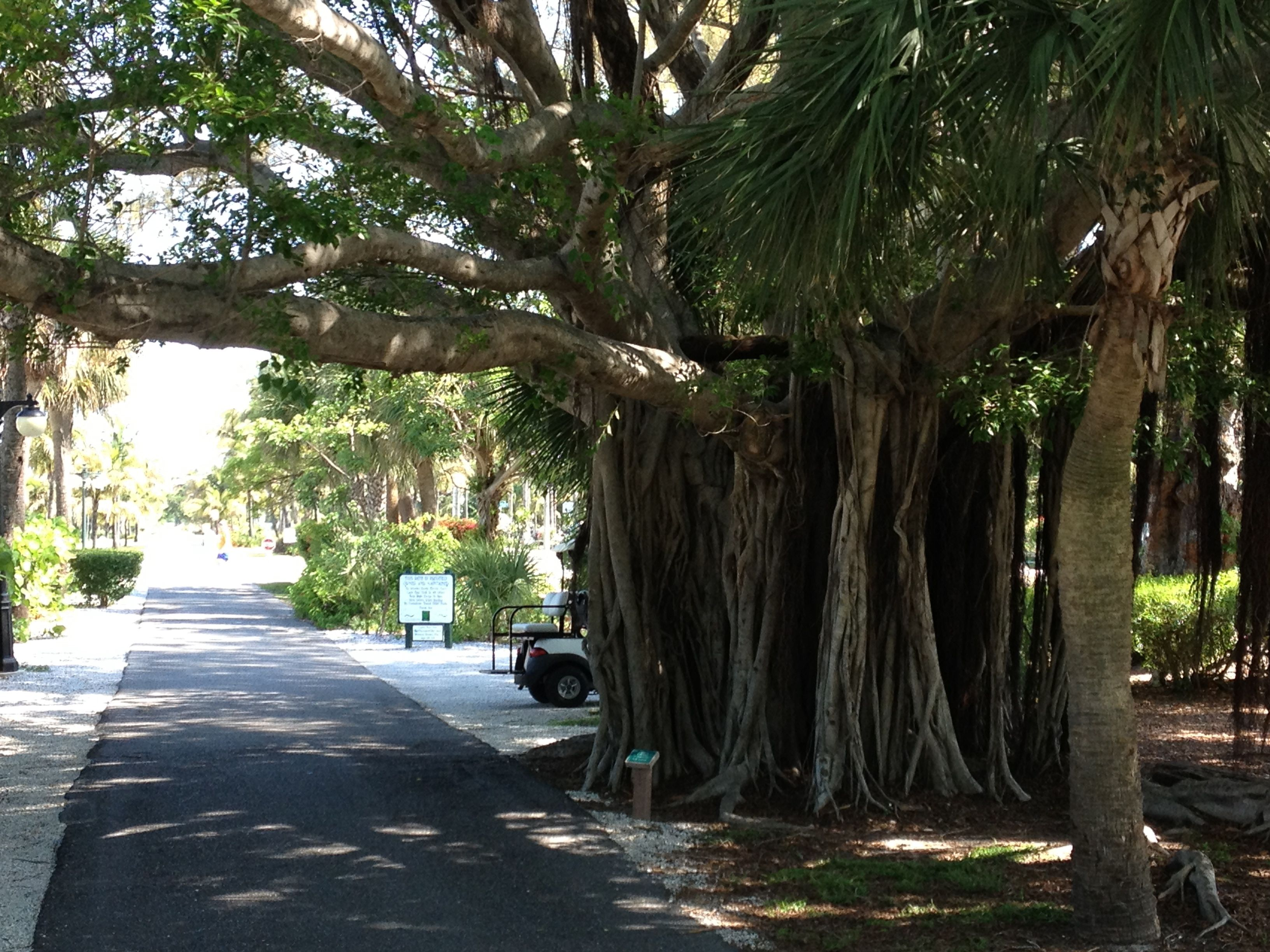
Boca Grande Bike Path

The former Charlotte Harbor and Northern Railway was abandoned in 1981 after the closure of the phosphate port on the south end of the island. Bayard Sharp, an heir of the Du Pont family who controlled the Gasparilla Inn, saw the need for a bike path after one of his employees had been killed on a bicycle on the island. Sharp managed to acquire the railroad's right of way and built the path on it. The trail was dedicated on February 23, 1985. The Gasparilla Island Conservation and Improvement Association, a non-profit organization based on the island, currently operates the path.

== Route Description ==
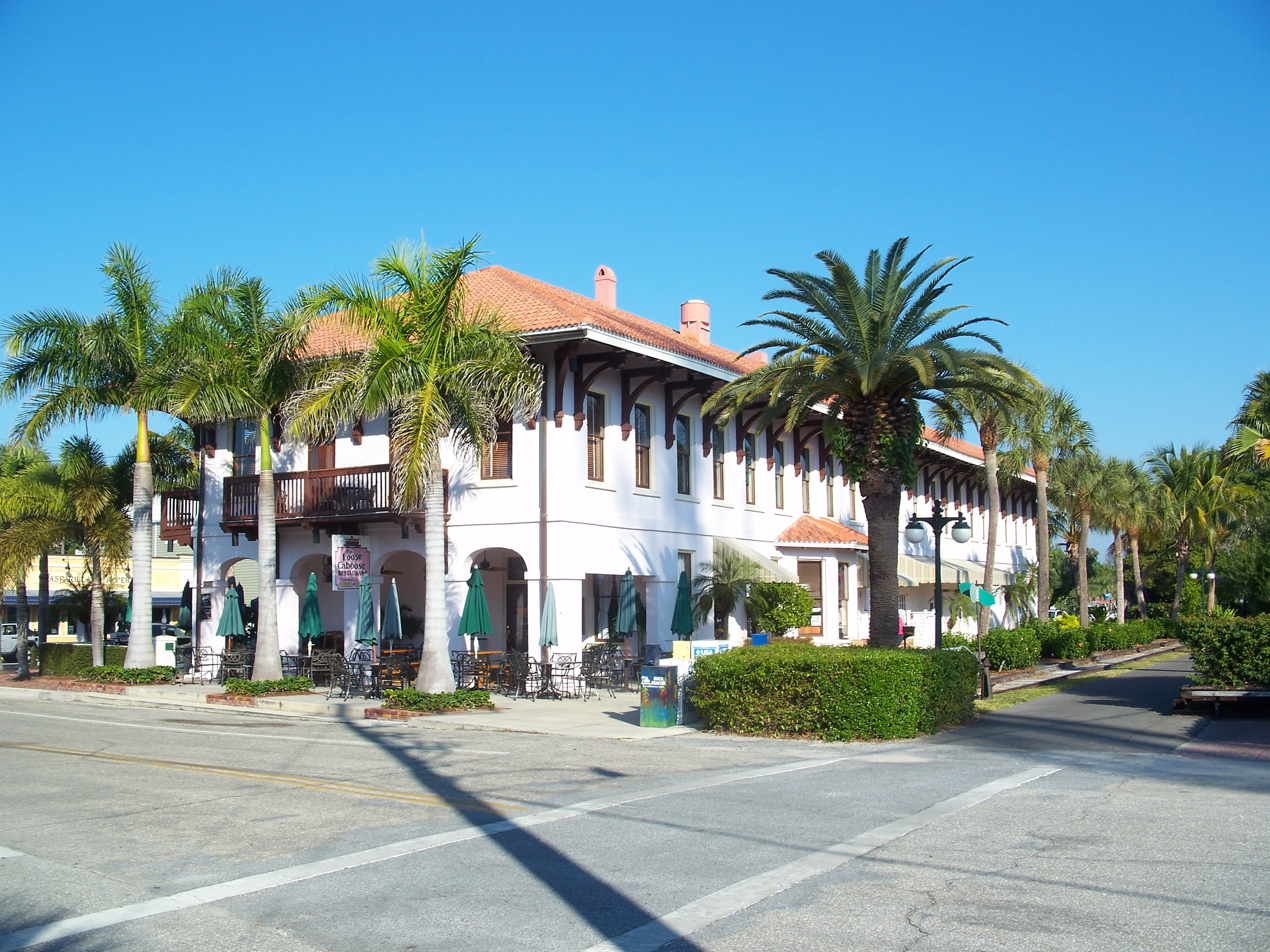
Boca Grande Bike Path passing the historic Charlotte Harbor and Northern Railway Depot

The Boca Grande Bike Path begins at the north end of Gasparilla Island on the access road behind 5800 Gasparilla Road. It parallels Gasparilla Road from the causeway, passing behind the historic Charlotte Harbor and Northern Railway Depot a few blocks before reaching 1st Street. At 1st Street it runs west through the downtown area and turns south to continue along Gulf Boulevard past Gasparilla Island Lights, terminating at Belcher Road and Gulf Boulevard.

== Points of interest ==
- Boca Grande Fishing Pier
- Charlotte Harbor and Northern Railway Depot
- Gasparilla Island Lights
- Gasparilla Island State Park
