= Boca Brava =

Coordinates: 8°13′N 82°16′W

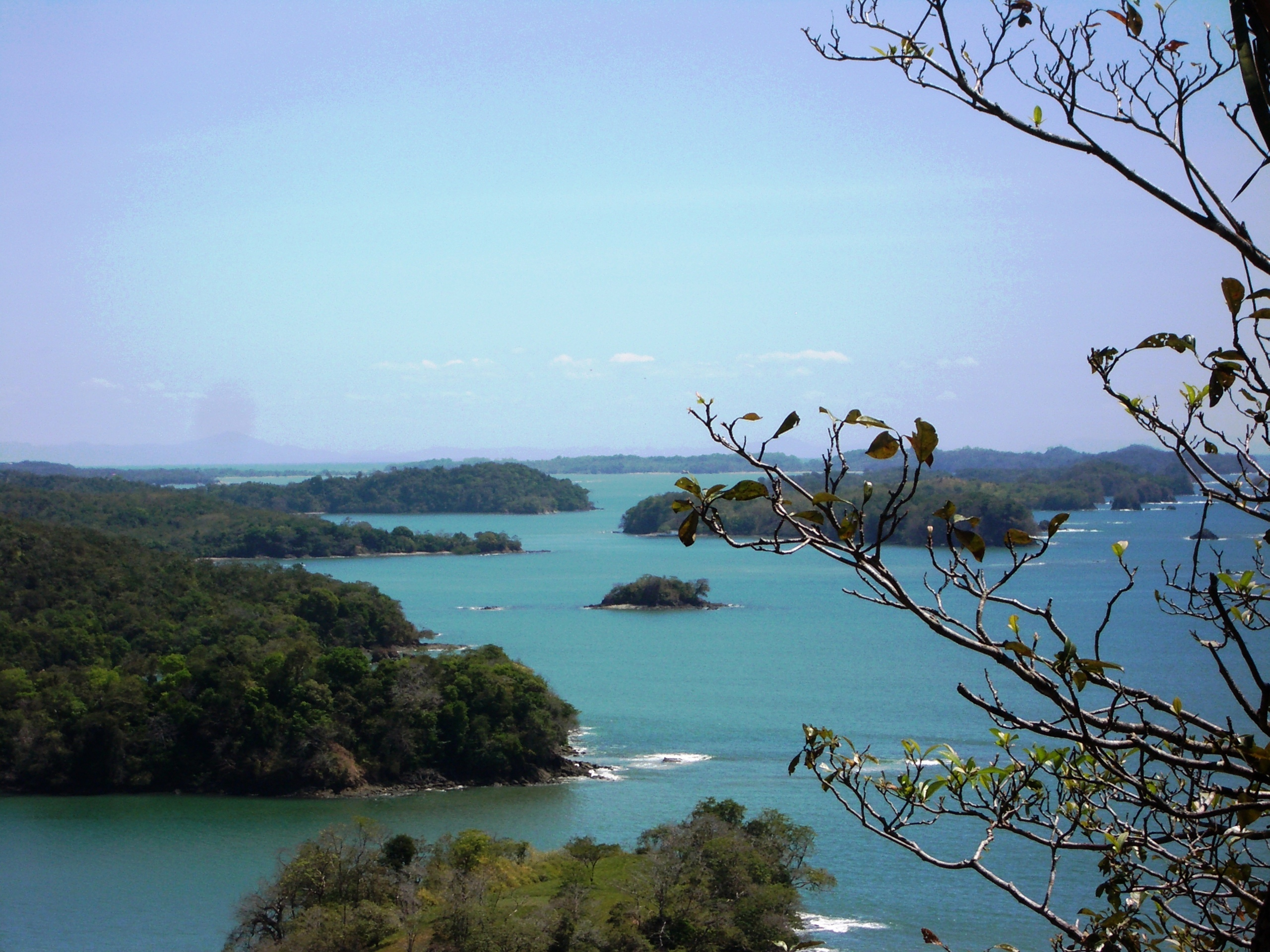
view over Isla Boca Brava, Panama

Isla Boca Brava is located off the Pacific coast of Panama in the Gulf of Chiriquí, specifically in the Bahia de Muertos which is a coral reef. It is about one-half mile from the small mainland village of Boca Chica. Boca Brava connects to Isla Palenque by way of a narrow land bridge.
