= Islas Secas =

Islas Secas Lighthouse
- Location: Isla Secas; Gulf of Chiriquí; Panama
- Coordinates: 7°59′39.2″N 82°02′05.7″W

Tower
- Construction: metal skeletal tower
- Height: 20 metres (66 ft)
- Shape: square pyramidal skeletal tower with balcony and light
- Markings: white tower
- Power source: solar power

Light
- Focal height: 63 metres (207 ft)
- Range: 15 nautical miles (28 km; 17 mi)
- Characteristic: L Fl W 9s.

Islas Secas ('Dry Islands') is a luxury resort set on a 14-island archipelago in the Gulf of Chiriquí on the Pacific coast of Panama, launched in December 2018. It is located 33 nautical miles from the town of Punta Tierra, Chorcha.

Islas Secas comprises eight ‘Casitas’, accommodating up to 18 guests on one of the islands. Each Casita is surrounded by the island's tropical forest. The archipelago is an eco-destination, with strong eco-reserve credentials powered by 100% solar-generated energy. It is near Coiba National Park, which is a UNESCO World Heritage site, and its waters are visited twice a year by two different populations of migrating humpback whales.

Islas Secas is currently owned by American investor and conservationist philanthropist Louis Bacon, who supports efforts to protect natural resources in the United States and beyond.

Islas Secas was previously privately owned by American entrepreneur Michael Klein, who constructed the original eco-resort on the islands, prior to his death on a flight from the islands to view Volcán Barú.

== See also ==
- List of lighthouses in Panama
- Boquerón, Chiriquí
- Volcán Barú
