= Samarinești =

- Commune
- Location in Romania
- Coordinates: 44°45′N 23°03′E
- Country: Romania
- County: Gorj
- Subdivisions: Băzăvani, Boca, Duculești, Larga, Samarinești, Țirioi, Valea Bisericii, Valea Mică, Valea Poienii
- Area: 32.48 km^{2} (12.54 sq mi)
- Population (2021-12-01): 1,620
  - Density: 49.9/km^{2} (129/sq mi)
- Time zone: UTC+02:00 (EET)
  - Summer (DST): UTC+03:00 (EEST)
- Vehicle reg.: GJ

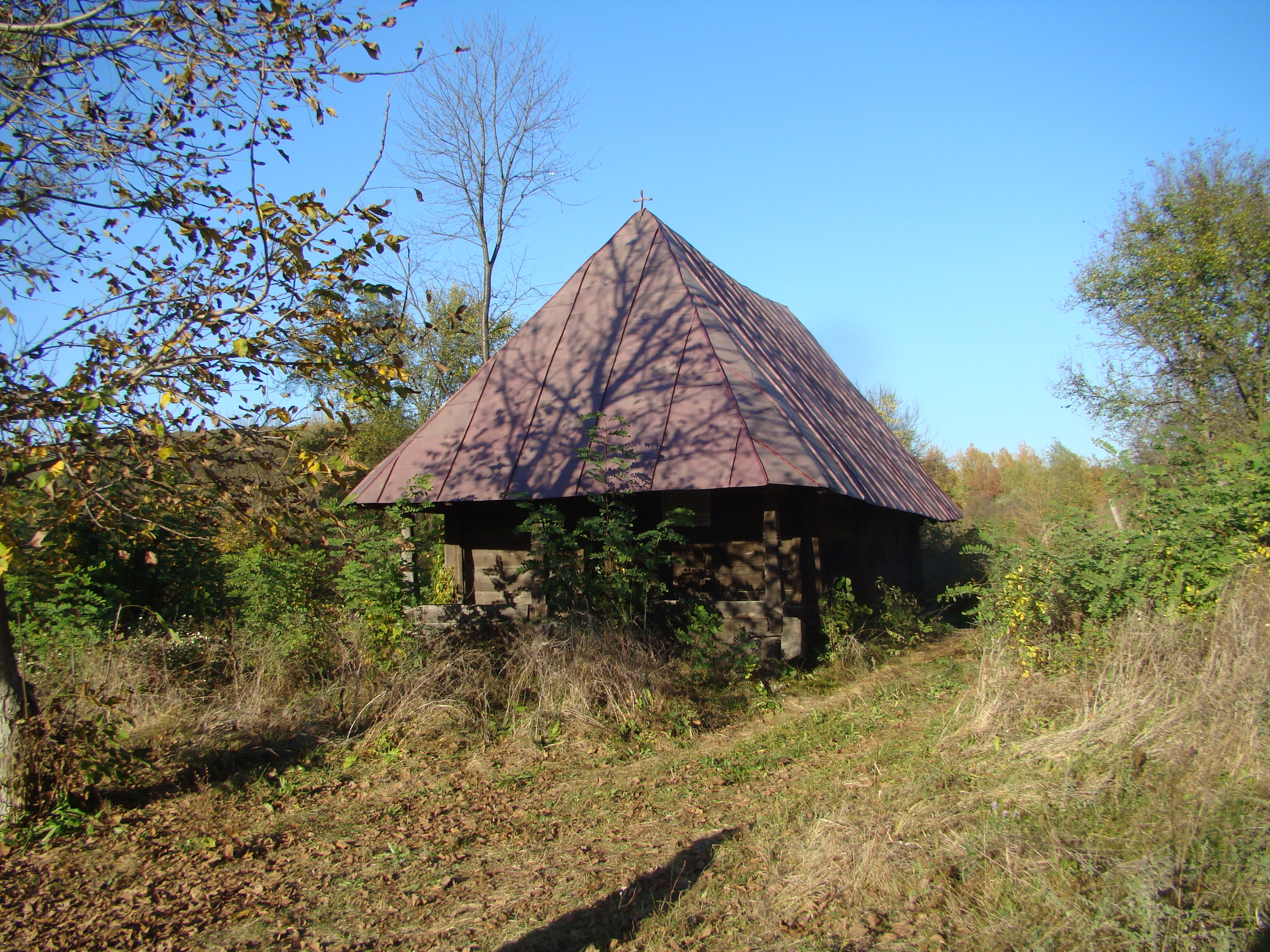

Samarinești is a commune in Gorj County, Oltenia, Romania. It is composed of nine villages: Băzăvani, Boca, Duculești, Larga, Samarinești, Țirioi, Valea Bisericii, Valea Mică, Valea Poienii.
