= Port of Boca Chica =

Port in the Dominican Republic

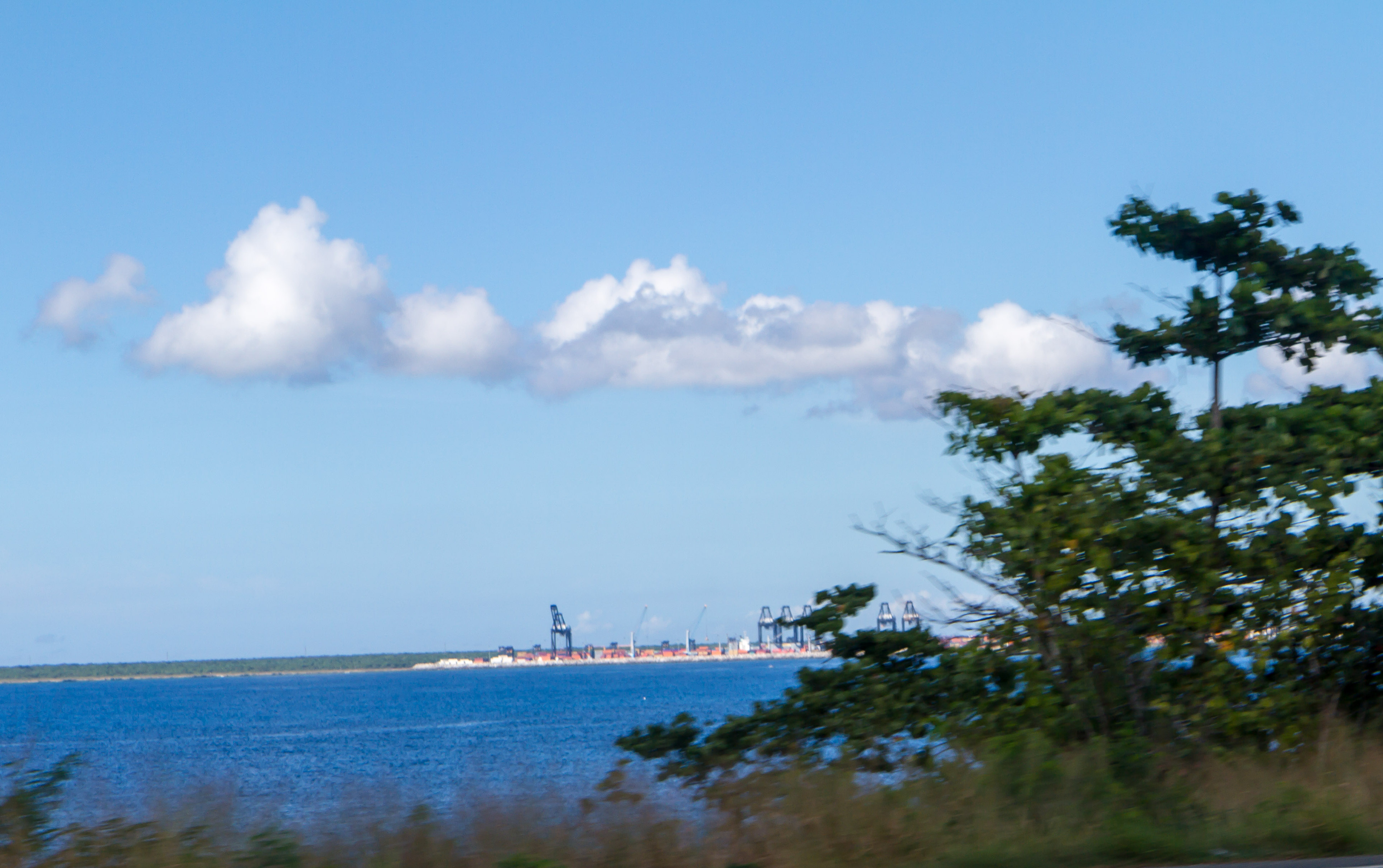
Port of Boca Chica, Santo Domingo, Dominican Republic

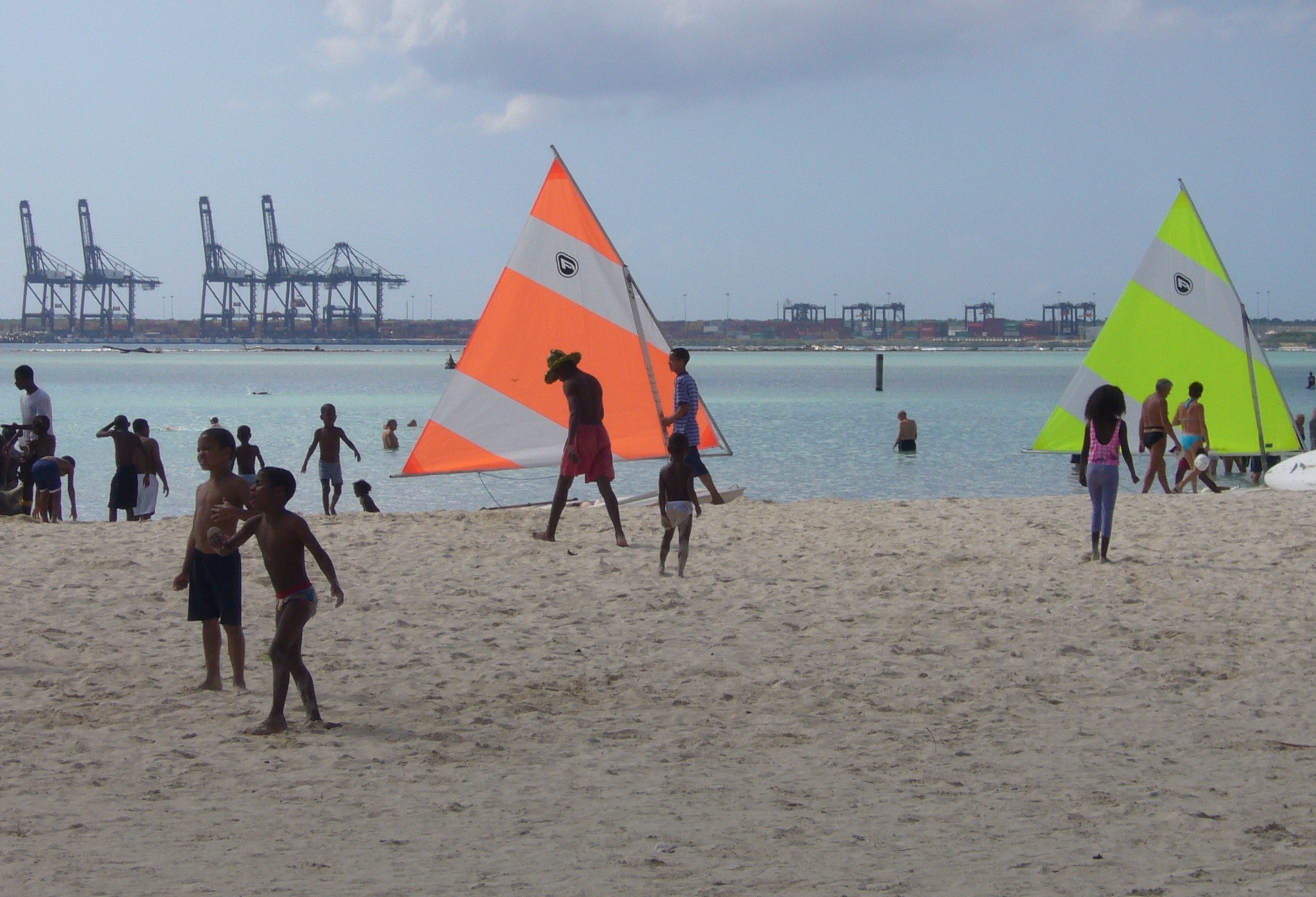
Boca Chica beach with port

The Port of Boca Chica is located in Boca Chica, Santo Domingo Este, Dominican Republic. Established in the 1950s to facilitate sugar transportation, the Boca Chica Port has since transformed into a minor hub for cargo operations within the country. The Boca Chica Port is also home to the AES Company's energy-generating facility.

== Port information ==
- Location: 18°26′26″N 69°37′47″W
- Local time: UTC−4
- Weather/climate/prevailing winds: From May 15 until September 15
- Climate: mostly sunny, tropical. Hurricane season runs from June to November
- Prevailing winds: direction ENE–ESE
- Average temperature range: 28–30 °C

== See also ==
- List of ports and harbours of the Atlantic Ocean
