= Gulf of Chiriquí =

Gulf on Panama's Pacific coast

Coordinates: 7°56′N 82°15′W

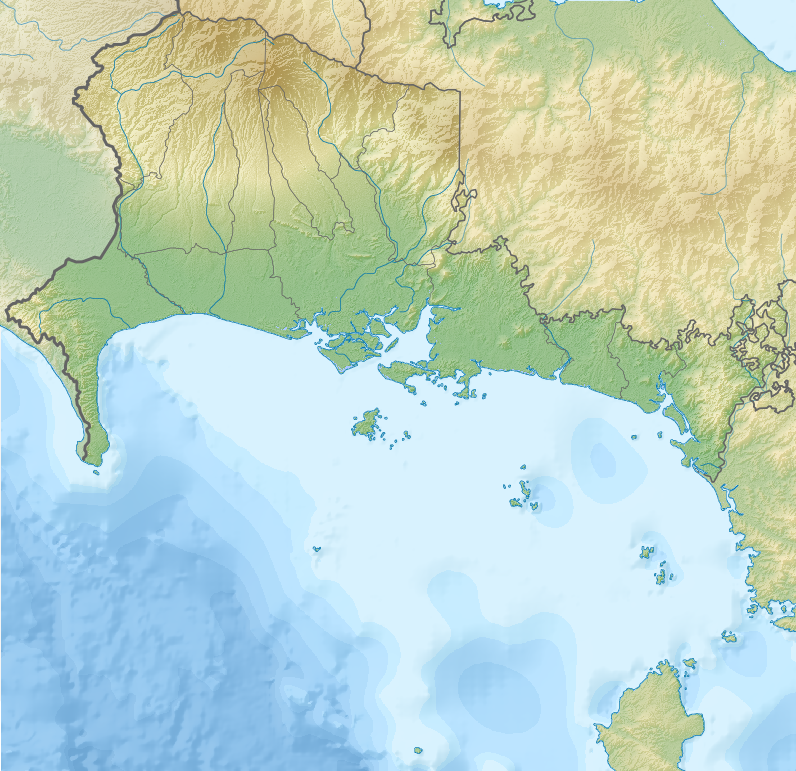
Map of Chiriquí Province

The Gulf of Chiriquí is a part of Panama that encompasses Coiba National Park and Golfo de Chiriquí National Park. There are dozens of islands in this Gulf. Along with the islands of Coiba National Park there are also Islas Secas, Isla Los Ladrones, Isla Parida, Isla Boca Brava, Isla Palenque, and Isla Montuosa.

Montuosa is the farthest island from Panama in this gulf. During certain seasons, you can even spot Galapagos seals on Montuosa. The Gulf of Chiriquí also includes one of the most famous big game fishing areas, Hannibal Bank, located just 13 miles east of Isla Montuosa and 20 miles west of Coiba National Park.

== Geography ==
- Boca Chica - Boca Chica is located 18 miles south of the IntraAmerican highway, via the community of Horconcitos, in the San Lorenzo District. It is a small village known as a popular jumping-off point for sportfishing in the Gulf of Chiriquí.

=== Islands ===
- Boca Brava and Isla Palenque - Boca Brava is about one-half mile from Boca Chica. You can get to Boca Brava by water taxi. It is covered in untouched rain forests and home to multiple families of howler monkeys, as is the neighboring island, Isla Palenque.
- Islas Secas - The Islas Secas is a group of sixteen islands.
- Isla Parida - Inside the Golfo de Chiriquí National Park. Located 12 miles offshore and southwest of Boca Chica. Dozens of smaller islands, that surround the main island of Isla Parida, are also encompassed inside the national park.
- Los Ladrones - Los Ladrones is a small group of four islands. The four islands are the only islands that appear above the surface. There are many islands that come up almost to the surface, some of them dangerous for boats. 300-foot-deep (91 m) channels also cut through the area, bringing in large fish and mammals.
- Isla Muerto - Boca Chica Island, also known as "Boca Chica Island", is approximately 6 miles from the town of Boca Chica.

=== National Park ===
Coiba National Park has gained World Heritage Site status. Many of the same species found in Coiba National Park can also be found in other areas of this gulf. Whales can be seen in the Gulf of Chiriquí throughout the year and are seen in large number from May to November. This is a season of migration for the humpback whale from the icy waters of the arctic to the warm waters of the Gulf of Chiriquí. Many give birth in the protected waters of Coiba National Park but can be seen by all nearby islands.

Panama's Tommy Guardia National Geographical Institute is charting the first interactive map for whale watching in Latin America to aid in collecting research and contributing to the protection and preservation of the endangered mammal. Gabriel Despaigne said:

When the Green Association of Panama in 2003 began the "Save the whales" campaign, people thought that the mammals were only in cold countries, and now it’s a rare person who doesn’t know that Panama has whales.

Humpback whales are one of over 20 species of marine mammals that can be observed in the area. The tropical bottlenose whale, fin and pilot whales along with large pods of bottle-nosed, common and spinner dolphins are common. Examples of toothed whales such as the orca and sperm whale are also seasonal visitors.

== See also ==
- Boquerón, Chiriquí
- Islas Secas
