= Boca Del Mar, Florida =

- unincorporated place
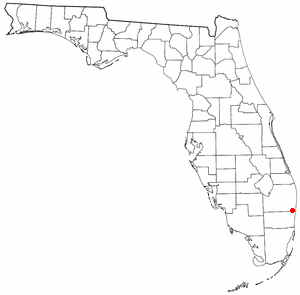
- The location of Boca Del Mar, Florida.
- Coordinates: 26°20′42″N 80°8′48″W
- Country: United States
- State: Florida
- County: Palm Beach

Area
  - Total: 4.0 sq mi (10.4 km^{2})
  - Land: 4.0 sq mi (10.4 km^{2})
  - Water: 0 sq mi (0.0 km^{2})
- Elevation: 13 ft (4 m)

Population (2000)
  - Total: 21,832
  - Density: 5,430/sq mi (2,096.6/km^{2})
- Time zone: UTC-5 (Eastern (EST))
  - Summer (DST): UTC-4 (EDT)
- Area codes: 561, 728
- FIPS code: 12-07235
- GNIS feature ID: 1867116

Boca Del Mar was a former census-designated place (CDP) and current unincorporated place near Boca Raton in Palm Beach County, Florida, United States. The population was 21,832 at the 2000 census. While it is not officially in the City of Boca Raton, the community is often classified under its umbrella term.

The development was first planned in 1969 as "Boca Granada" by the Behring Development Company, who previously developed Tamarac Lakes, and Woodmont and The Woodlands in the Fort Lauderdale area. The name was changed to its current moniker to avoid confusion of a nearby condominium complex, and the first approval for a planned unit development was granted in 1971. Behring was sold to Cerro Corporation in 1972 and Leadership Housing, Incorporated was formed, a joint-venture between Cerro and the real estate development arm of another conglomerate Texaco Industries, who had previously developed Anaheim Hills. Leadership Housing would develop other upscale communities in the area, and construction progressed significantly in the 1980s.

== Geography ==
Boca Del Mar is located at 26°20′42″N 80°8′48″W (26.344957, -80.146590), or approximately three miles southwest of Boca Raton.

According to the United States Census Bureau, the CDP has a total area of 10.4 km^{2} (4.0 sq mi), all land.

== Demographics ==
Historical population
Census	Pop.	Note	%±
1990	17,754		—
2000	21,832		23.0%
U.S. Decennial Census

As of the census of 2000, there were 21,832 people, 10,911 households, and 5,662 families residing in the CDP. The population density was 2,096.9 people/km^{2} (5,431 people/mi^{2}). There were 12,009 housing units at an average density of 1,153.4 units/km^{2} (2,987 units/mi^{2}). The racial makeup of the CDP was 94.43% White (87.7% were Non-Hispanic White), 1.23% African American, 0.05% Native American, 1.88% Asian, 0.03% Pacific Islander, 1.06% from other races, and 1.32% from two or more races. Hispanic or Latino of any race were 8.16% of the population.

In 2000, there were 10,911 households, out of which 16.5% had children under the age of 18 living with them, 42.2% were married couples living together, 7.4% had a female householder with no husband present, and 48.1% were non-families. 39.9% of all households were made up of individuals, and 17.1% had someone living alone who was 65 years of age or older. The average household size was 1.95 and the average family size was 2.60.

In 2000, in the former CDP, the population was spread out, with 14.4% under the age of 18, 6.3% from 18 to 24, 27.3% from 25 to 44, 24.4% from 45 to 64, and 27.6% who were 65 years of age or older. The median age was 47 years. For every 100 females, there were 83.0 males. For every 100 females age 18 and over, there were 79.2 males.

In 2000, the median income for a household in the CDP was $52,335, and the median income for a family was $69,531. Males had a median income of $49,013 versus $35,485 for females. The per capita income for the CDP was $36,983. About 1.7% of families and 4.3% of the population were below the poverty line, including 2.5% of those under age 18 and 3.3% of those age 65 or over.

As of 2000, English as a first language accounted for 83.16% of all residents, and Spanish accounted for 8.46%, French was spoken by 1.14%, both Hebrew and Portuguese totaled at 1.12%, Italian made up 0.99%, German was at 0.89%, Yiddish at 0.84%, both Chinese and Russian were at 0.59%, and French Creole was 0.44% of the population.

As of 2000, Boca Del Mar west of Powerline Road, as well as Boca Grove Plantation and the Estancias of Via Verde to the north, are notable for their significant concentration of Orthodox Jewish communities primarily including the Montoya and Del Prado Circle areas. There are a number of sizable synagogues, kosher restaurants, markets, and other establishments catering to these communities located in the area.
