= Boca (magazine) =

American lifestyle magazine

- May–June 2024 issue of Boca magazine
- Categories: Lifestyle
- Frequency: Monthly
- Publisher: JES Publishing
- Country: United States
- Based in: South Florida
- Language: English
- Website: bocamag.com

Boca magazine (also known as Boca Raton magazine) is a South Florida based lifestyle magazine that self-describes itself thus "Boca Raton magazine is on the front lines of local issues and events in South Florida, covering the lighter side of life like dining news and fashion, to more substantive issues and trends."

In 2020, John Shuff, the publisher of Boca magazine died. Shuff moved to Boca Raton and founded JES Publishing in 1981, which, including Boca, also publishes such publications as Worth Avenue, Delray and Mizner’s Dream.

in 2022, the Florida Magazine Association named Boca FMA Magazine of the Year.

== Mission statement ==
Upon receiving Florida Magazine Association's 2022 award for magazine of the year, Boca's then editor-in-chief Maria Speed described the publication's mission "Boca magazine’s mission is to navigate our community and region for our readers, touching on all aspects of lifestyle, including the tougher issues that also define where we live."

== Later developments ==
In 2024, journalist Christiana Lilly was named new editor-in-chief of Boca magazine.

Lilly replaced long-time editor Marie Speed, who was Lilly's mentor while working as a web editor at Boca. Prior to landing her editorial positions at Boca, Lilly worked as a freelancer for several years for LGBTQ outlets.
