= Boca Grande, Venezuela =

Boca Grande
- Location within Venezuela
- Coordinates: 9°56′00″N 61°34′00″W
- Country: Venezuela

Boca Grande II is the largest floating iron ore transfer station in the world and is located in the Serpiente Strait, Venezuela. Iron ore is shipped from Puerto Ordaz, on the Orinoco River by two 90,000 DWT self-discharging shuttle vessels ('Rio Orinoco' and 'Rio Caroni') prior to being received at the transfer station for trans-shipment overseas.

The transfer station itself is a converted 200,000 DWT VLCC (ex 'Berge Brioni') with a storage capacity of approximately 180,000t. Export vessels moor on the port side and are loaded by a travelling, gravity-fed conveyor boom with a 36m outreach which eliminates the need for shifting during loading. Approximately 60 vessels are handled annually.

== Namesakes ==
There are several places called Boca Grande in this and other countries.

== See also ==
- Transport in Venezuela
- Venezuela
