= Gulf of Chiriquí National Marine Park =

Coordinates: 8°6′47.14″N 82°18′12.93″W

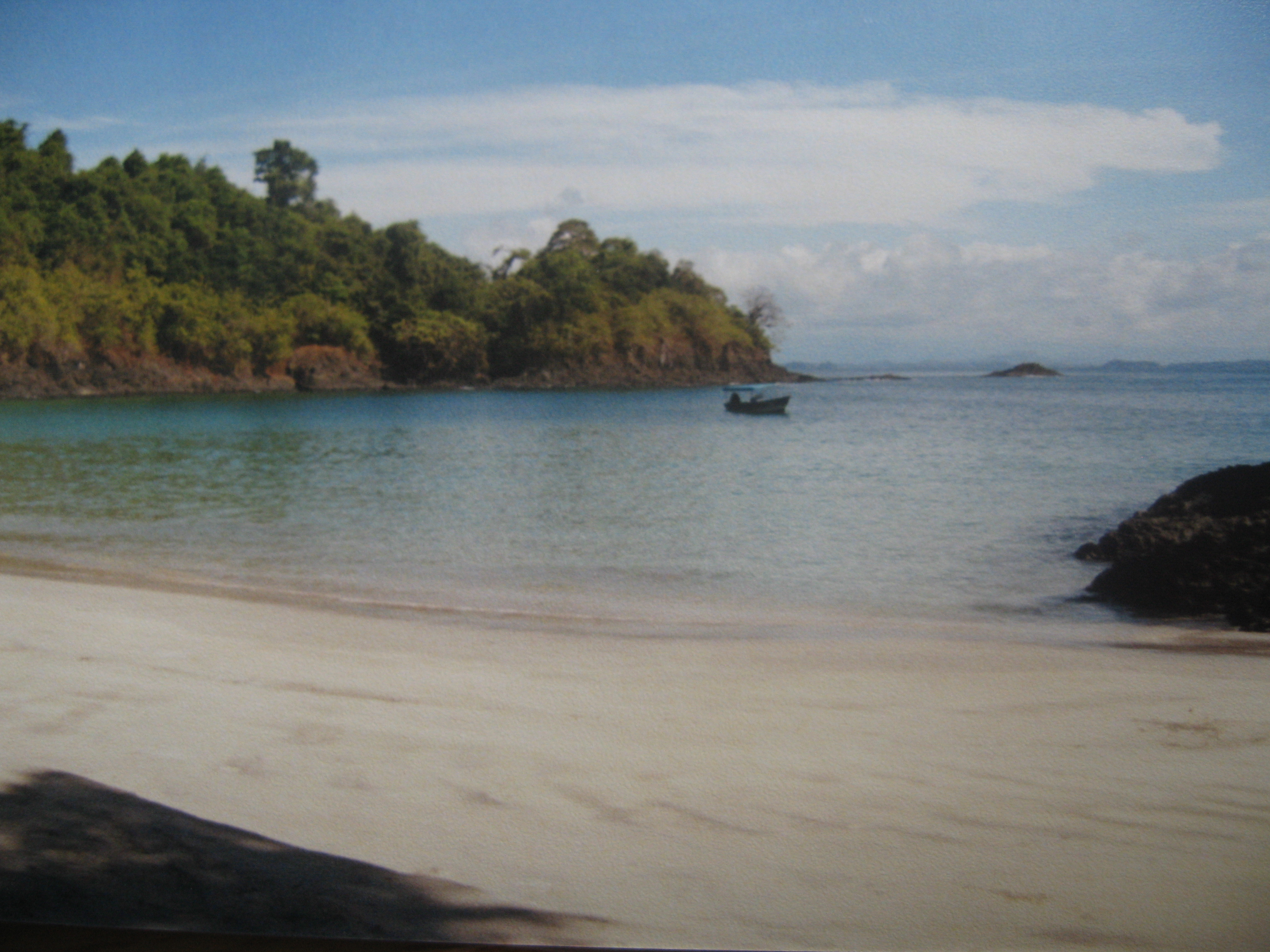
Beach at Golfo de Chiriquí National Park

The Gulf of Chiriquí National Marine Park is located in the Gulf of Chiriquí, on the Pacific coast of Panama. It was established in 1994 to protect 150 square kilometres (58 sq mi) of marine ecosystems, including coral reef, mangrove swamp and marine meadow, and around two dozen islands of the archipelago of Isla Parida. In total, the park has 25 islands and 19 coral reefs.

The park is known for its wildlife including: green iguanas, humpback whales (from August to October), hammerhead sharks, whitetip reef sharks, manta rays, dolphins and multiple species of sea turtle that nest on the beaches of the islands.

Islands protected within the park include Santa Catalina, Pulgoso, Gámez, Tintorera, Obispo, Obispone, Los Pargos, Ahogado, Icacos, Corral de Piedra, Bolaños, Bolañitos and Berraco. These islands are covered by tropical forests including cedar, hawthorn and oak which can provide timber; threats to the area include logging.

== See also ==
- Protected areas of Panama
