= Communist Workers Bloc of Andalusia =

Spanish political party

The Communist Workers Bloc of Andalusia (in Spanish: Bloque Obrero Comunista de Andalucía) was a political formation in the municipality of Jódar, Jaén province, Spain. BOCA emerged from a split from the Communist Party of the Andalusian People (PCPA).

== History ==
BOCA was registered as a political party on February 25, 1998. BOCA has participated in the 1999 and 2003 municipal elections in Jodar. In 1999 it got 435 votes (6.46%) and one seat in the municipal council.

In 2001, Cristóbal Jiménez Ramírez, the first democratic mayor in of Jódar, got into a physical fight with members from the United Left (IU) over plans of housing construction in the municipal. Jiménez claimed he would not go to any municipal meeting without police protection

In 2003 it got 495 votes (7.08%) and one seat. At times BOCA have supported the municipal government of the United Left. In January 2004 a break between BOCA and IU occurred, after which IU had to seek support from the Popular Party (PP).

Later in 2006, the party merged into United Left.
