= Ratón =

Spanish fighting bull (2001–2013)

- Poster advertising Ratón's appearance at R icla's bullring on 24 July 2010
- Species: Bos taurus
- Sex: Male
- Born: April 2001; Sueca
- Died: 24 March 2013 (aged 11)
- Nationality: Spanish
- Owner: Gregorio de Jesús
- Parents: Caracol (bull), Fusilera (cow)
- Weight: 500 kg (1102 lb)

Ratón ("Mouse" in English) (April 2001 – 24 March 2013) was a Spanish fighting bull that was nicknamed el toro asesino (the killer bull), el sangriento toro Raton (the bloody bull 'Raton') and el terrible Ratón (the terrible Mouse) for killing three people in bullfighting rings in Spain during 2006–2011 and injuring thirty more. The bull became legendary in Spain due to the large number of gorings for which he was responsible. Bullfighting fans regarded him as a star and traveled from across the country to see the morlaco (big bull) at his home at Sueca near Valencia. Matador Jesús Esteve said of Ratón: "He is a killer. He is lazy, he doesn't want to participate. He does his own thing, waiting for somebody to make a mistake. And then when he gets you, he wallops you, and he doesn't let up."

Due to Ratón's fame, bullfighting clubs paid exceptionally high fees of up to €15,000 to feature him in their events. In 2010, for instance, the municipality of Ricla hosted Ratón during a festival in honour of St. Mary Magdalene, paying €9,000 – nine times the normal fee for a fighting bull. The bull's fame was so great that, as in the case of the Ricla fiesta, he was given star billing on advertisements. Although the organisers had to pay very high fees to see Ratón perform, the bull's owner asserted that the outlay was worth it: "[H]e works out the cheapest because wherever he goes organizers double the ticket price."

== Career ==
Born in April 2001, 500 kg (1,100 lb) Ratón was the offspring of a bull named Caracol and a cow named Fusilera. He was given his name for his diminutive size as a calf. He first appeared in the bullring in September 2002 and gored a matador for the first time in Canals, Valencia, in 2004. As well as participating in bull running in the streets (encierros in Spanish), Ratón also often performed in the recortes, a style of bullfighting in which members of the public dodge the bull around obstacles such as wooden stairs or platforms placed in a bullring. At one such event held in Museros in 2005, Ratón gored a dozen people and injured several more in another event at Yátova in 2006.

Ratón took his first life on 9 August 2006 during Sagunto's festival, when he gored a 56-year-old man from León more than ten times. The killing was caught on video and was viewed on the Internet by hundreds of thousands of people. It made Ratón an instant star, and his owner was flooded with requests from bullfighting clubs. Bulls that have killed people are classified as muy buenos (very good); fiestas starring such bulls attract more people than usual, and bullfighting clubs will pay more money to exhibit them.

Ráton's second kill was made in 2008 in the arena of Benifairó near Valencia when he attacked a 27-year-old amateur matador, catching the man only two feet from safety. After hitting the man from behind, Ratón threw him in the air several times before leaving him trampled in the ring with fatal injuries.

Ratón claimed his third victim in Xàtiva on 13 August 2011, killing a 29-year-old man who had jumped into the arena while drunk. A video played repeatedly on Spanish television showed the unnamed man being lifted on the bull's horns before being thrown to the ground and attacked. He later died in hospital. The man's death prompted controversy; Valencian regional politician Marina Albiol accused the event organisers of "grave irresponsibility" for hiring a bull with such a record. She called the show "cruel and dangerous to animals and people" and said that it should not receive any public funding. The mayor of Sueca, Salvador Campillo, expressed regret at the death but said that it did not justify Sueca "no longer seeing its most famous bull". He supported plans to bring Ratón to an event in the town in September 2011 and said that the show would be well controlled and that drunken participants would be kept out.

Ratón was lightly worked compared to other fighting bulls; whereas his counterparts were usually on tour all year, Ratón's appearances were limited to ten a year and only in regions where bullfighting regulations do not require the animal to be killed after the fight. At 10 years old, Ratón's age was equivalent to that of a 60-year-old human. He was due to retire in 2010, but due to demand from fans and municipalities organising fiestas, his owner, Gregorio de Jesús, decided to prolong the bull's career. De Jesús felt that he could not refuse because of the economic plight of Spain's farmers. In 2010, de Jésus proposed that Ratón be cloned and asked for financial assistance from the Generalitat Valenciana, but although he was told that the government would consider the request, no decision was made.

== Owner ==
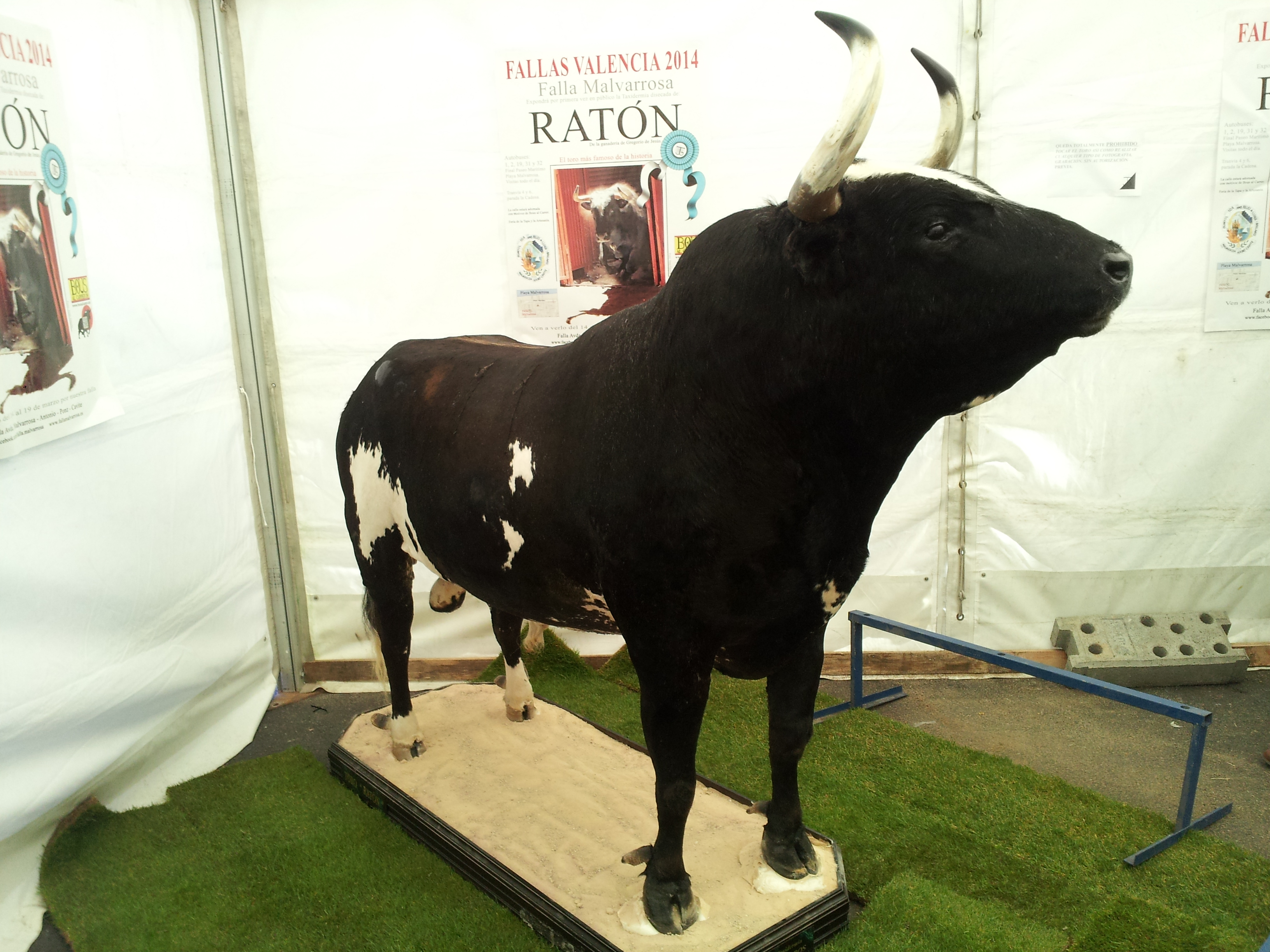
Ratón, taxidermied, in 2014.

Ratón's owner Gregorio de Jesús is a former matador who fought at the Plaza de Toros Monumental de Aguascalientes in Mexico. After hanging up his sword in 1993, he retired to Sueca, where he grows oranges and rice as well as breeding cattle. He compared Ratón to the boxer Muhammad Ali: "He is agile, smart, fast. Very high-spirited. He's not a brute, not like other bulls that act on instinct and crash into everything. This one thinks, analyzes, and then attacks." Responding to criticism that Ratón has "nothing special", de Jesús noted that great sporting figures have always had their detractors: "They doubt Raúl [the footballer], but there are his goals. With Ratón the same thing happens, his performances will live on."

De Jesús attributed Ratón's unusual deadliness to the bull's physique and action in the ring: "Ratón is a very agile bull, with long limbs, which greatly facilitates his actions on the stage, bench and pyramid. He attacks with short and repetitive thrusts at the same time as swinging the head to the left and right, causing all his victims a much higher number of injuries than normal in these cases." According to de Jesús, Ratón's savage temperament may have derived from an early trauma when children locked the young bull in the dark for hours. The animal was shaking when de Jesús found him, and since then, says the farmer, Ratón always had a bad temper.

== Death ==
Ratón had suffered arthritis and been under veterinarian treatment for a limp for over a month. He would not recover; he became sickly in his last 24 hours and was given antibiotics. Ratón died naturally on the following afternoon, 24 March 2013. Covering his death, The Daily Telegraph said the bull, about whom a biography has been written and who inspired a video game was "arguably the most famous and feared bull in Spain". His owner announced plans to have him taxidermied and mounted for display in the Valencian town of Sueca.
