= Boca Chica, Chiriquí =

Boca Chica
- Town and corregimiento
- Interactive map of Boca Chica
- Location within Panama
- Coordinates: 8°13′N 82°13′W
- Country: Panama
- Province: Chiriquí
- District: San Lorenzo

Area
  - Land: 116 km^{2} (45 sq mi)

Population (2023)
  - Total: 553
  - Density: 4.8/km^{2} (12/sq mi)
- Population density calculated based on land area.
- Time zone: UTC−5 (EST)

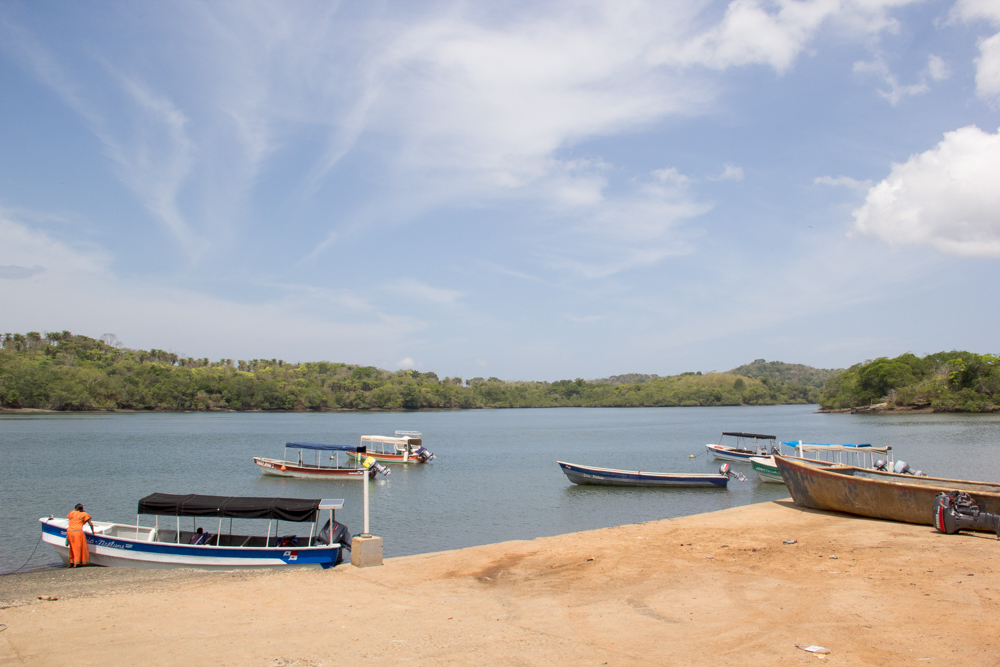
Boca Chica dock (circa 2018)

Boca Chica is a town and corregimiento in San Lorenzo District, Chiriquí Province, Panama. It has a land area of 116 square kilometres (45 sq mi) and according to the last national census in 2023, has a population of 553, giving it a population density of 4.8 inhabitants per square kilometre (12/sq mi). Its population as of 1990 was 171; 291 as of 2000 and 441 as of 2010.

There is only one road from the Pan-American Highway (a 30 km stretch, re-paved in 2024) via Horconcitos to this town, and it ends at the estuary of the Pedregal River with the island of Boca Brava just across the water. Boca Chica is the main jumping off point for the islands in the Gulf of Chiriquí, with boat rentals and water-taxi's available. A new public dock was built in 2024, allowing easy and safe access. The village is known for its sport fishing (black marlin, dorado and tuna are abundant) and many businesses in the area are geared toward that activity, along with island hopping tours, snorkelling and scuba diving, sunset and mangrove cruises, and whale-watching.

Boca Chica is the home to the Annual International Jigging and Popping Tournament (the first held on June 11, 2009) where the winner took in a 130 lb. yellowfin tuna for a $10,000 prize

Its popularity as a prime sport fishing destination has attracted a number of related businesses and developers to the Boca Chica area. As a result, a growing expat population has been established in recent years, with a recent increase due to the vastly improved road.

It is also a popular anchorage for sailboat and Powerboat Cruisers. Its proximity to David and Pedregal make it a well protected provisioning anchorage with basic services. It is served by the international airport in David (DAV), and by several Bus lines.
