= Boca Grande, Florida =

Residential community in Florida, US

Coordinates: 26°44′56″N 82°15′43″W

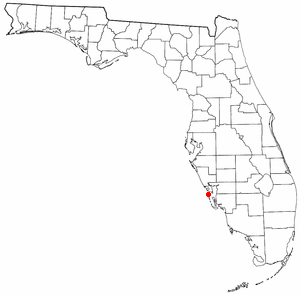
Location of Boca Grande, Florida

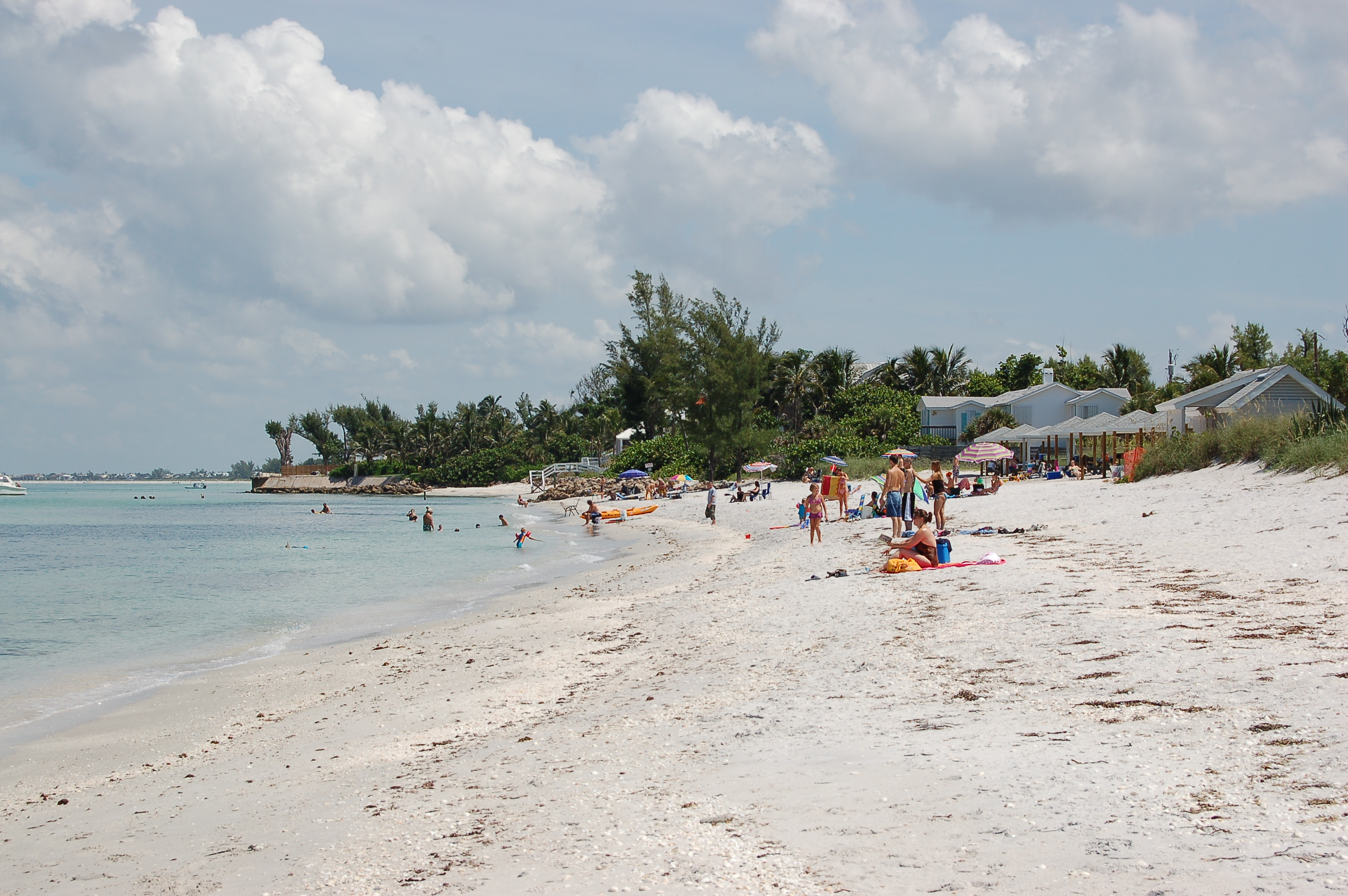
Public beach on Gulf Blvd, looking north

Boca Grande is a small residential community on Gasparilla Island in southwest Florida. Gasparilla Island is a part of both Charlotte and Lee counties, while the actual village of Boca Grande, which is home to many seasonal and some year-round residents, is entirely in the Lee County portion of the island. It is part of the Cape Coral-Fort Myers, Florida Metropolitan Statistical Area. Boca Grande is known for its historic downtown, sugar sand beaches, blue water and world class fishing.

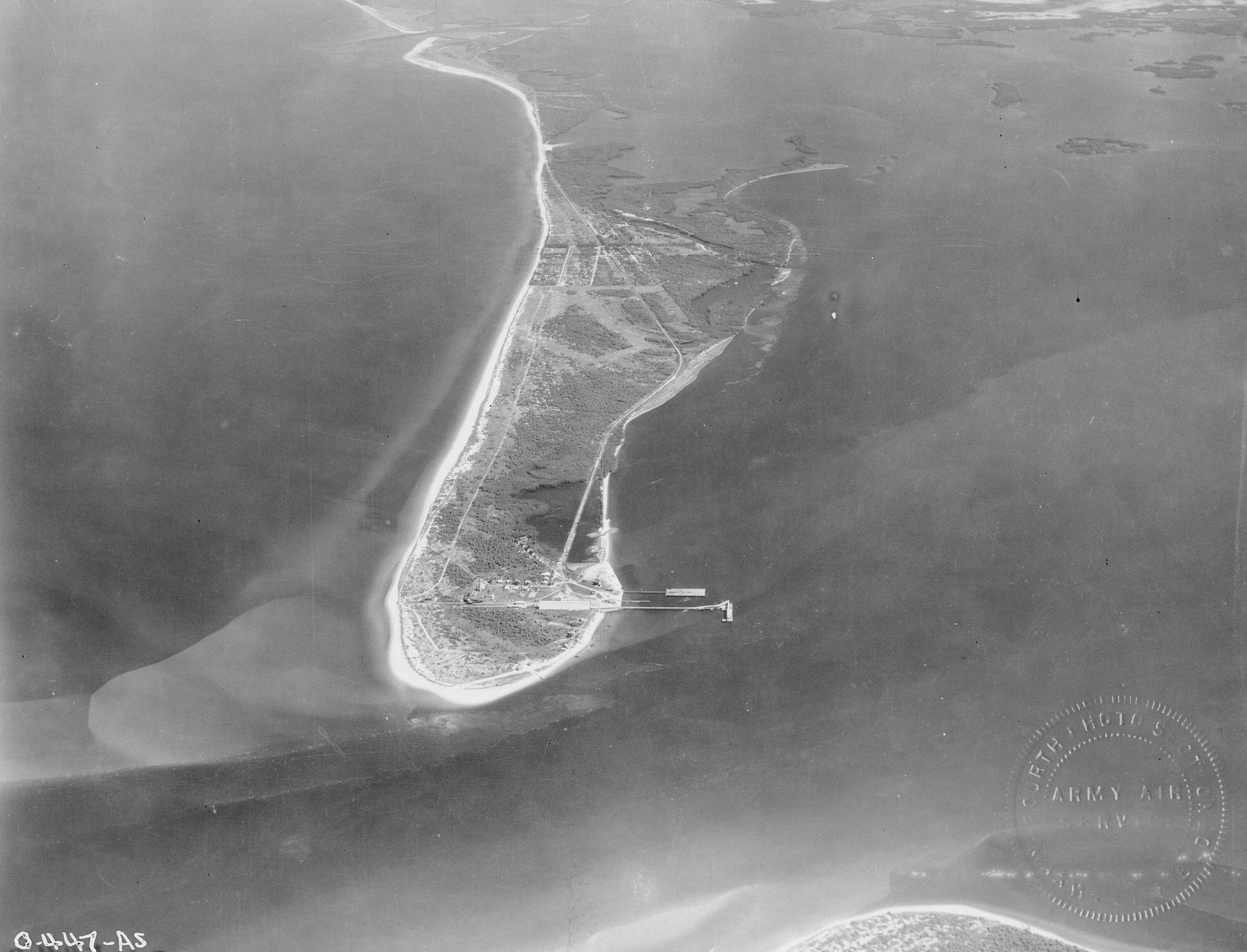
View of Boca Grande, December 1924

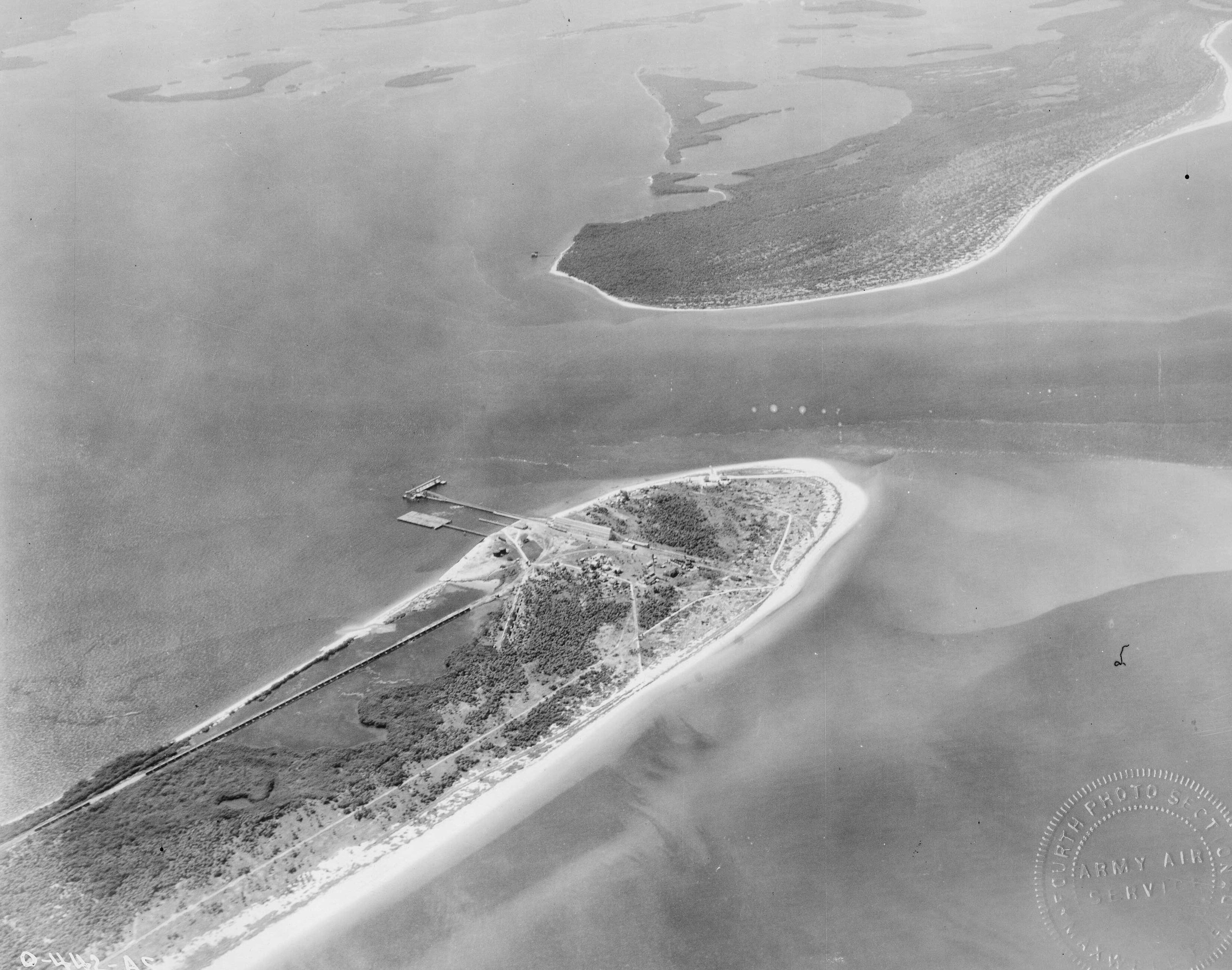
Different view of Boca Grande, December 1924

== Overview ==
The community's name – Spanish for "Big Mouth" – comes from the mouth of the waterway, called Boca Grande Pass, separating the southern tip of the island from Cayo Costa. The pass was used as a busy shipping point for many years, as the waters in the pass are naturally deep. Processed phosphate from the Bone Valley region was loaded onto waiting ocean-going cargo vessels via the Seaboard Air Line Railroad at the dock located on the southern tip of the island. Shipping business to the island declined in the late 1970s, as it was no longer cost effective to ship phosphate by rail to Boca Grande when it could be loaded at Tampa. The phosphate plant at Boca Grande was old and its tons-per-hour rate was slow. Therefore, it made economic sense to discontinue the operation. Evidence of the island's industrial past can still be seen.

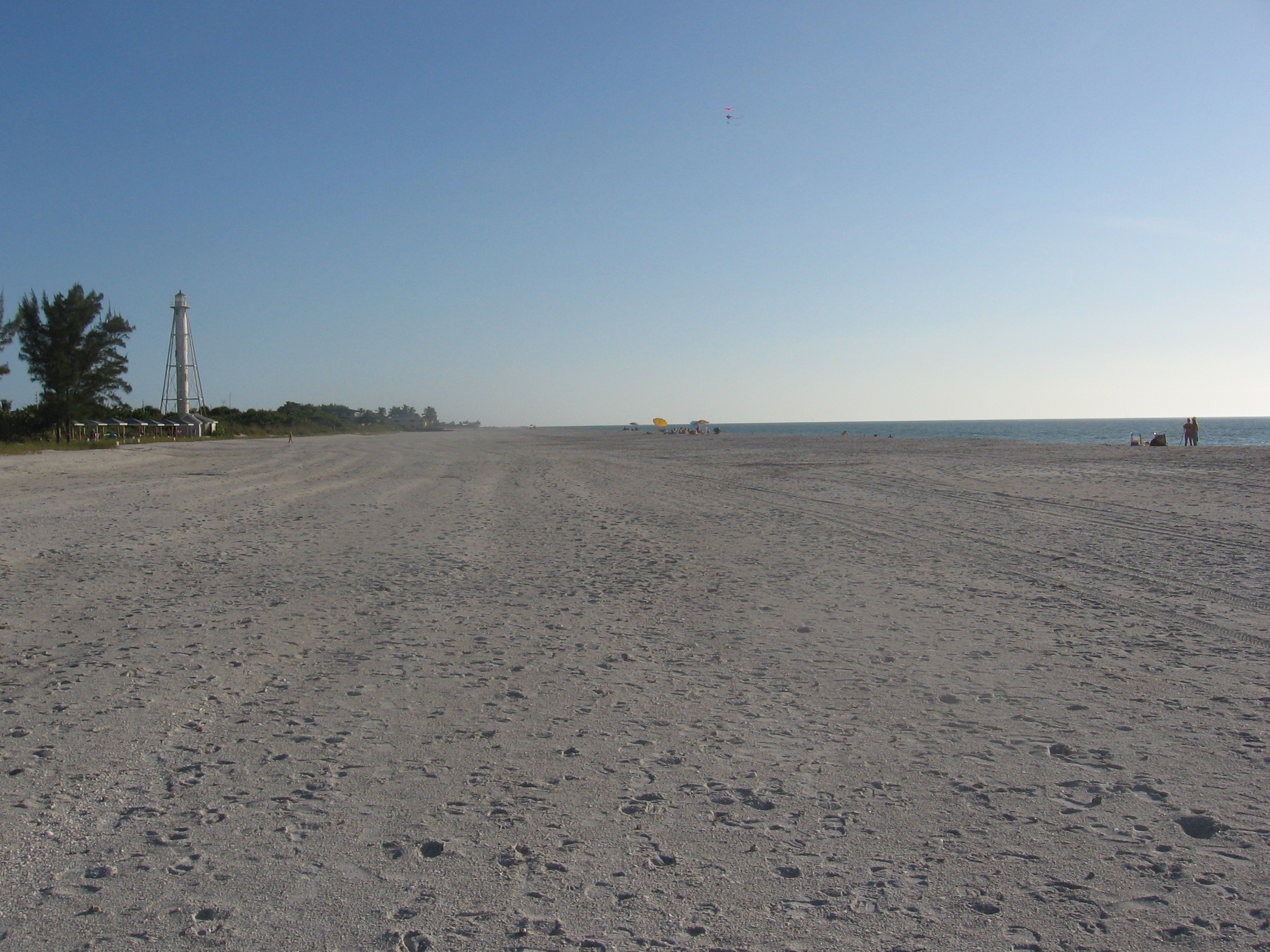
Same beach, looking south in November 2007 after re-naturing

There are no gas stations in the village of Boca Grande, with the exception of a street pump at Boca Grande Marina, so many residents use golf carts as their main mode of transportation. A Lee County ordinance designates all but two streets as golf cart paths. Drivers must be at least 14 years old to operate a golf cart on these designated streets.

Boca Grande provided the backdrop for Denzel Washington's movie, Out of Time, where the quiet village was renamed "Banyan Key" in reference to the banyan trees that populate the island. Scenes for the 2006 film based on Carl Hiaasen's book Hoot were also filmed on the island, which was again renamed for the filming. This time it became "Coconut Cove".

Boca Grande's serene beauty makes it a destination for high-profile weddings and residences for the elite seeking privacy. Sara Blakely (Spanx founder and owner) and Jesse Itzler were married on Boca Grande in 2008, while the Bush family and Audrey Hepburn have called it home seasonally.

Hurricane Charley hit Boca Grande heavily on August 13, 2004, causing some US$20 billion worth of damage to Southwest Florida. There were no deaths or injuries on the island, but many buildings and numerous banyan trees were heavily damaged.

== History ==
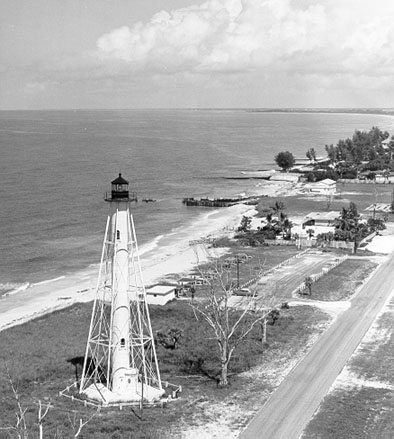
Boca Grande Rear Range Light, now known as the Gasparilla Island Light

=== Indigenous history ===
Gasparilla Island's first known inhabitants were the Calusa people. They were living on nearby Useppa Island by 5,000 BC and on Gasparilla Island by 800 or 900 AD. Charlotte Harbor was the center of the Calusa Empire, which numbered thousands of people and hundreds of fishing villages. The Calusa were a hunting and fishing people who perfected the art of maritime living in harmony with the environment. They were a politically powerful people, dominating Southwest Florida during their "golden age". Since the Calusa had no written language, the only record of their lifestyle and ceremonies comes from the oral history of the (much later) Seminoles, from written accounts of Spanish explorers, and from the archaeological record. The first contact the Calusa had with Europeans came during Spanish explorations at the beginning of the 16th century. By the mid-18th century, the Calusa had all but disappeared, the victims of European diseases, slavery and warfare.

Just like the Calusa, the next settlers came to Gasparilla Island to fish. By the late 1870s several fish ranches were operating in the Charlotte Harbor area. One of them would later be at the north end of Gasparilla Island in the small village of Gasparilla. The fishermen, many of them Spanish or Cuban, caught large quantities of mullet and other fish and salted them down for shipment to Havana and other markets. In the 1940s the Gasparilla Fishery was moved to Placida across the bay, and the fishing village died out. Many of Boca Grande's early fishing families are still represented in third-, fourth- and fifth-generation descendants who pursue many different vocations, including fishing.

=== Phosphate and tarpon industries ===
In 1885, phosphate rock was discovered on the banks of the Peace River just above Punta Gorda, east of Gasparilla Island across Charlotte Harbor. It was this discovery that would turn the south end of Gasparilla Island into a major deep-water port (Boca Grande Pass is one of the deepest natural inlets in Florida) and become responsible for the development of the town of Boca Grande. Wealthy American and British sportsmen began discovering the Charlotte Harbor area for its fishing (notably for the world-class tarpon) and hunting. It was these two discoveries – phosphate rock and fishing – that would "put Boca Grande on the map".

Phosphate was a valuable mineral for fertilizers and many other products, and was in great demand worldwide. At first the phosphate was barged down the Peace River to Port Boca Grande, where it was loaded onto schooners for worldwide shipment. By 1905 it was felt that building a railroad to Port Boca Grande and carrying the phosphate to it by rail would improve the method of shipment.

In 1905, officials of the Agrico subsidiary Peace River Mining Company, along with engineers from the Army Corps of Engineers and 60 laborers, landed on Gasparilla Island, and surveying and construction of the railroad began. Probably the only buildings on the south end of the island at this time were the lighthouse and the assistant keeper's house. The railroad terminus with its 1,000-foot-long (300 m) pier would be built nearby. The Charlotte Harbor and Northern Railroad was completed in 1907. For the next 50 years phosphate was shipped out of the state-of-the-art port virtually without disruption. Phosphate-laden trains were off-loaded directly onto ocean-going freighters, and the ships took the valuable commodity to ports all over the world. In 1969 Port Boca Grande ranked as the fourth-busiest port in Florida.

In the 1970s, phosphate companies increasingly switched their interest to ports in Hillsborough and Manatee counties. As more money was put into developing these ports, traffic into Port Boca Grande began to dwindle, and in 1979 the line was abandoned and the phosphate industry in Boca Grande came to an end. The port was also used as an oil storage terminal by Florida Power and Light Company. This use ceased in 2001. The oil storage tanks were subsequently removed from the 9-acre (36,000 m^{2}) site at the southern tip of Gasparilla Island adjacent to the 120-year-old Boca Grande Lighthouse. Island residents have begun an effort to have the property preserved as part of the island's state park system.

The Charlotte Harbor and Northern Railway not only brought phosphate and supplies to Gasparilla Island; it also brought wealthy people from the north. By 1910 Boca Grande Pass was already famous for its unequaled tarpon fishing among fishermen, who stayed on nearby Useppa Island. The Agrico Company, having begun to see the potential of developing Gasparilla Island beyond the port, began to develop the village of Boca Grande.

=== Early development; status as vacation destination ===
The railroad station in what would become downtown was built; roads, sidewalks, streetlights, shops, a post office, and water and telephone service were not far behind. The town was landscaped, including the now famous section of Second Street called Banyan Street. The railroad company built several cottages downtown, and a few wealthy families from "up north" purchased land and built winter residences. The train stopped at Gasparilla, the fishing village at the north end of the island, at the railroad depot in downtown Boca Grande, and at the south end phosphate terminal.

In 1913, the first hotel, the Gasparilla Inn, opened, and the island became a major vacation destination for the elite from Tampa, Fort Myers, and New England. Though shipping has declined substantially since the last quarter of the 20th century, tourism remains important to the island's economy.

In 1925, the Seaboard Air Line Railroad bought the assets and property of the Charlotte Harbor and Northern Railway, but it took the Interstate Commerce Commission three years to approve it, and the SAL finally merged with the CH&N in 1928. The Tampa to Boca Grande passenger train was still operated every day, along with a fast freight between Boca Grande and Plant City, until the SCL era slowly killed the port, forcing all phosphate traffic to Tampa Bay.

In 1929 the Boca Grande Hotel was built just south of the Boca Grande city center. It was a three-story, brick resort hotel where most of the island weathered the hurricane of 1944. The Boca Grande Hotel changed hands and was demolished in 1975. When attempt was made to demolish the hotel with explosives, it was unsuccessful. In total, explosive demolition was attempted three times. Finally, it took six months to raze the building by means of fire and the wrecking ball, as it had been built to withstand fire and great storms.

The railroad continued to bring winter visitors from all along the eastern seaboard and upper Midwest until the Boca Grande Causeway opened in 1958. The swing bridge spans two 80-foot-wide (24 m) channels on the Gulf Intracoastal Waterway at Placida Harbor. It was built from 1952 to 1958 to replace a ferry service. When the bridge became operational, it was faster to fly to Tampa and drive to Boca Grande than it was to take the train directly from the Northeast and Midwest. Rail passenger service to Boca Grande ended on April 12, 1959.

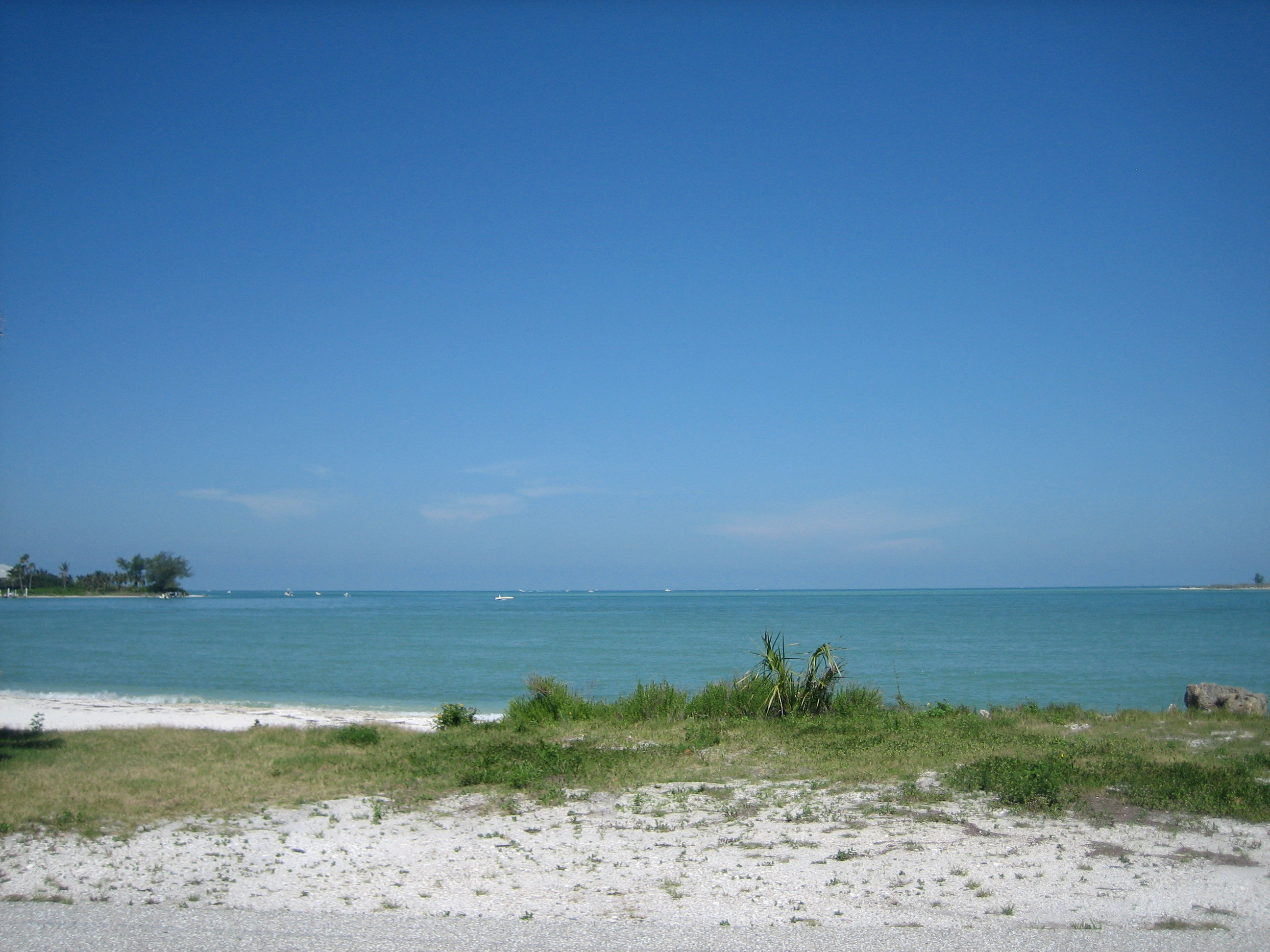
View From Boca Grande Causeway

=== 1970s to present day ===
The depot was restored in the 1970s, and a number of shops, offices and a restaurant now occupy the old building. The railroad continued to run work trains to the south end until the phosphate port closed in 1979. The rail line between Arcadia and Boca Grande was abandoned in 1981. Thanks to the generosity of Bayard and Hugh Sharp (members of the Du Pont family who had been winter residents for many years), the community purchased the old railroad bed from CSX Corp. (the successor corporation to the old Chessie and Seaboard systems) and transformed it into a new use—Boca Grande's popular Bike Path. Boca Grande has always been a unique community, with a large number of wealthy winter residents rubbing elbows with the fishermen and railroad and port workers who formed the permanent, year-round working population.

== Fishing ==
The Boca Grande Pass is considered one of the world's best tarpon fishing spots.

Tarpon congregate and spawn out of passes along most of the entire rim of the Gulf of Mexico. The massive attraction to Boca Grande Pass is unknown and subject to many theories. In the spring, it appears that many of the fish's habits all along the coast are in orientation to Boca Grande Pass. With depths reaching near 80 feet (24 m), it is the deepest natural pass in Florida. It is the only major outlet of Charlotte Harbor, which is fed by two major rivers, the Peace and the Myakka. As the bottleneck of the harbor, the currents are strong and serve as an underwater highway for many species of fish and bait.

Harpooning tarpon is documented back to the late 1700s by British settlers. There is some debate among historians on who caught the first tarpon on rod and reel in Florida. The fish gained fame from an 1885 story published in the magazine Forest and Stream. The article detailed an event that took place on March 12, 1885, when a New Yorker named W. H. Wood landed a 93-pound (42 kg) tarpon at the mouth of the Caloosahatchee River. While it may have not been the first tarpon caught on rod and reel, the fish's capture generated much publicity and is at least credited as exposing tarpon fishing to the world. Soon after, tarpon were given a game fish status to protect them from harpoons (known as "striking" or "graining") and nets that were common methods of taking tarpon.

In the late 1890s, a then-modern railway system was completed that gave the area access to the outside world. Soon sportsmen from the north as well as from Britain flocked to the area in quest for giant tarpon. Southwest Florida and the Florida Keys soon became the new headquarters of the sport fishing world. Fishing tourism grew even bigger when in 1908 Barron Collier built a "Tarpon Inn" on Gasparilla Island and made the island's town of Boca Grande world-famous as the "Tarpon Fishing Capital of the World".

== Demographics ==
In 2012, Boca Grande reported a population of 1,705 citizens. The median age of Boca Grande is 66.

== Gallery ==
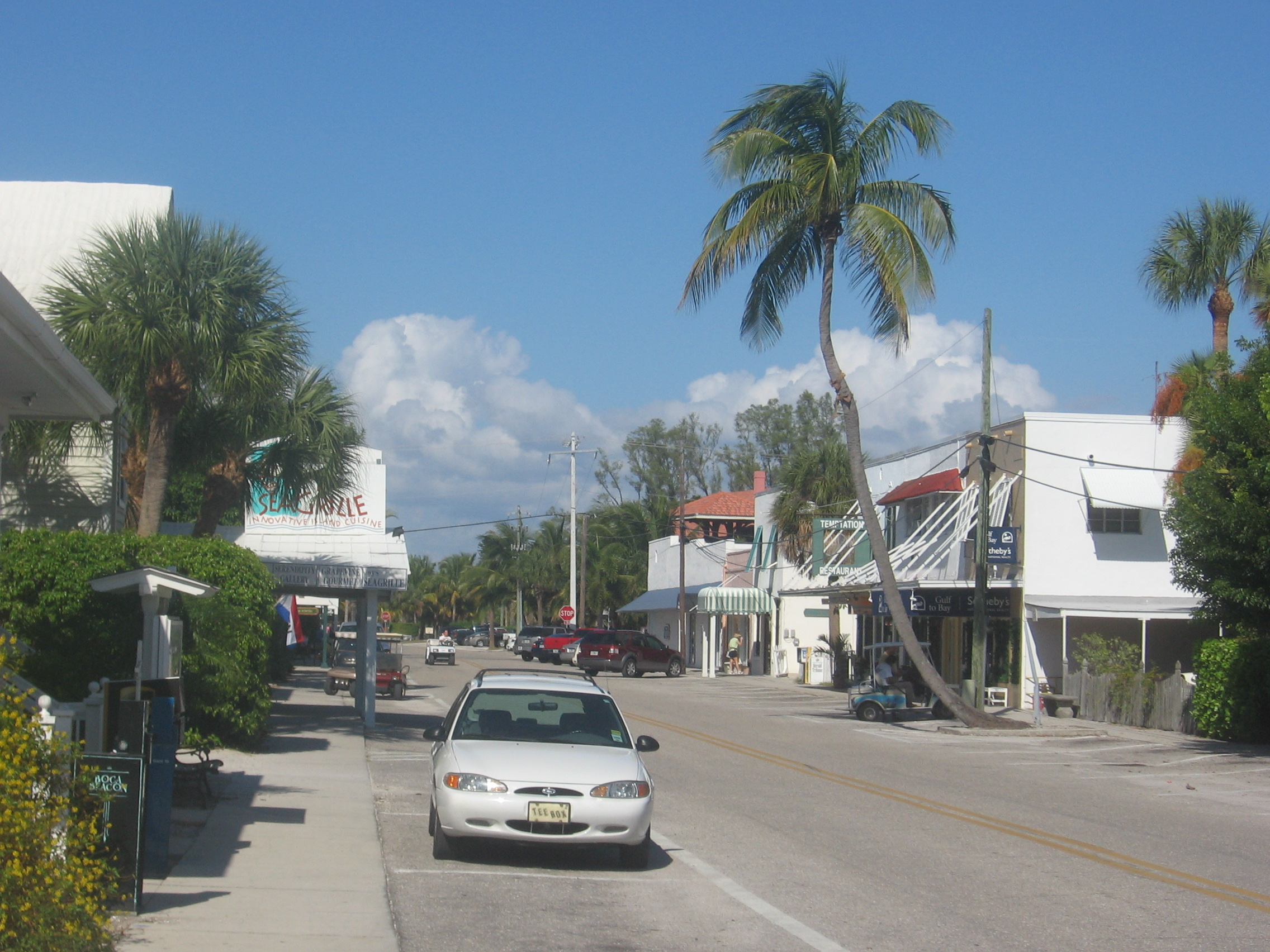
Looking north down Park Avenue

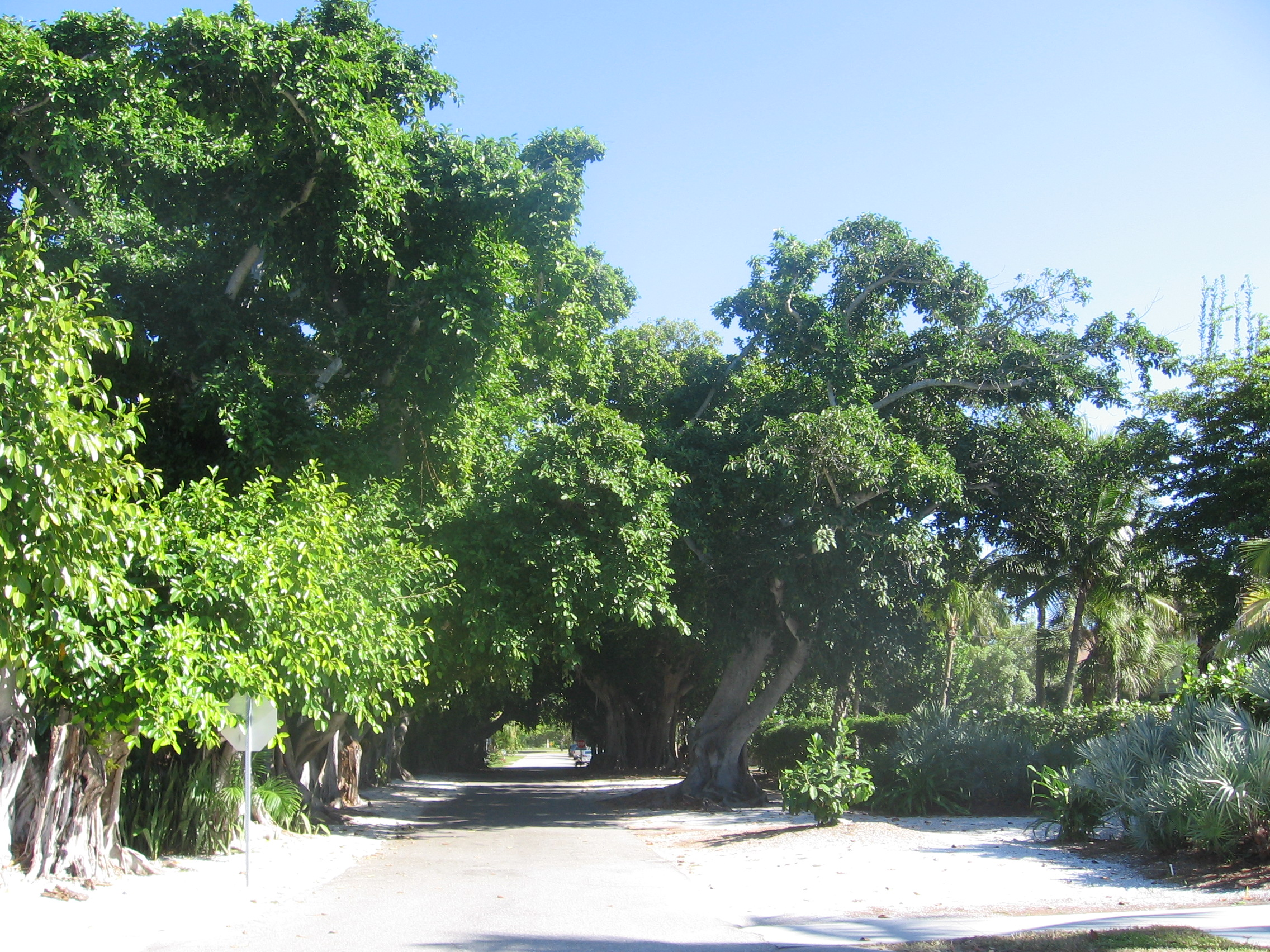
Banyan Street (The new tree front-right is due to damage from Hurricane Charley)

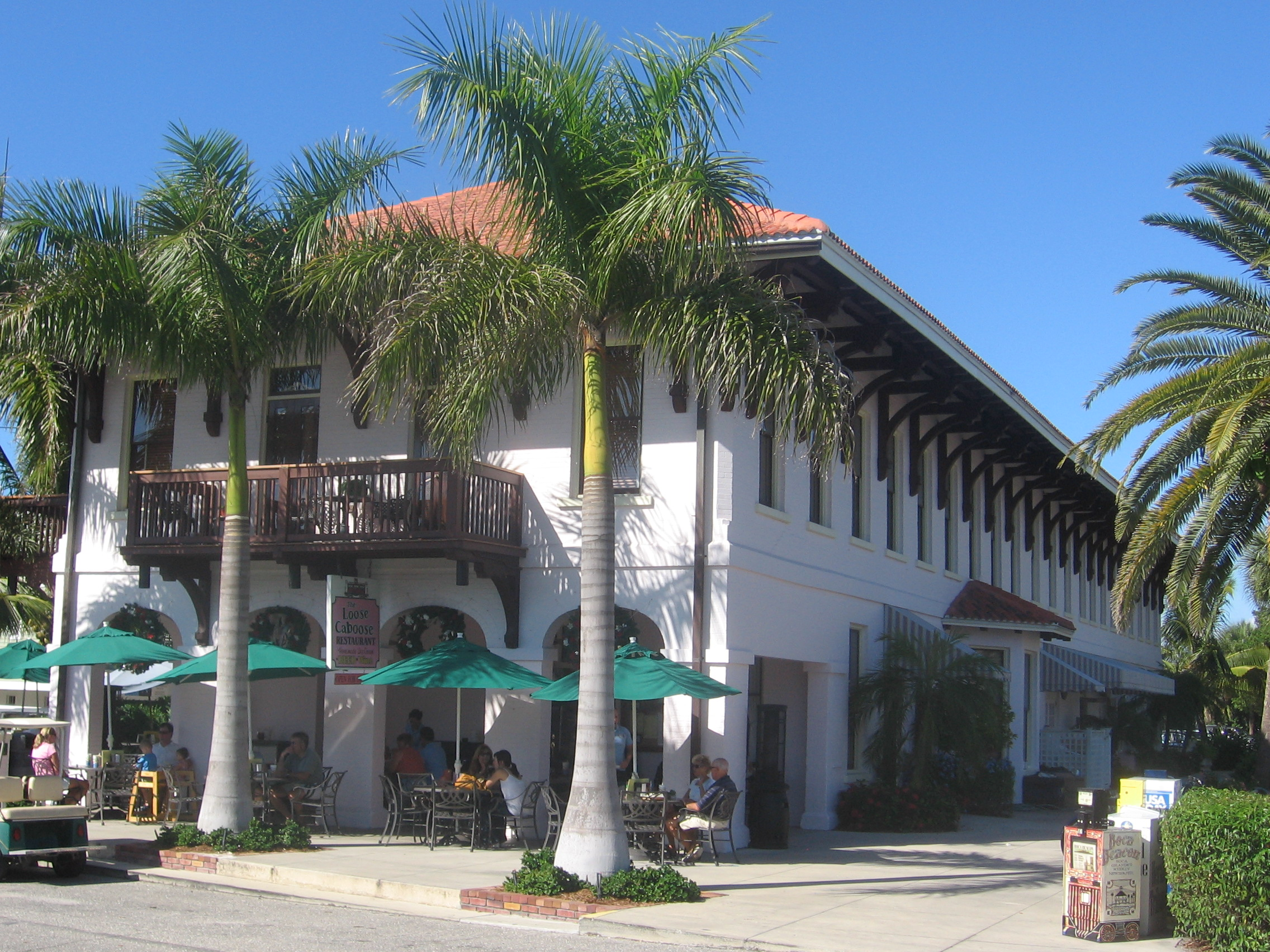
Former Charlotte Harbor and Northern Railway Depot; now a restaurant/shopping/office complex

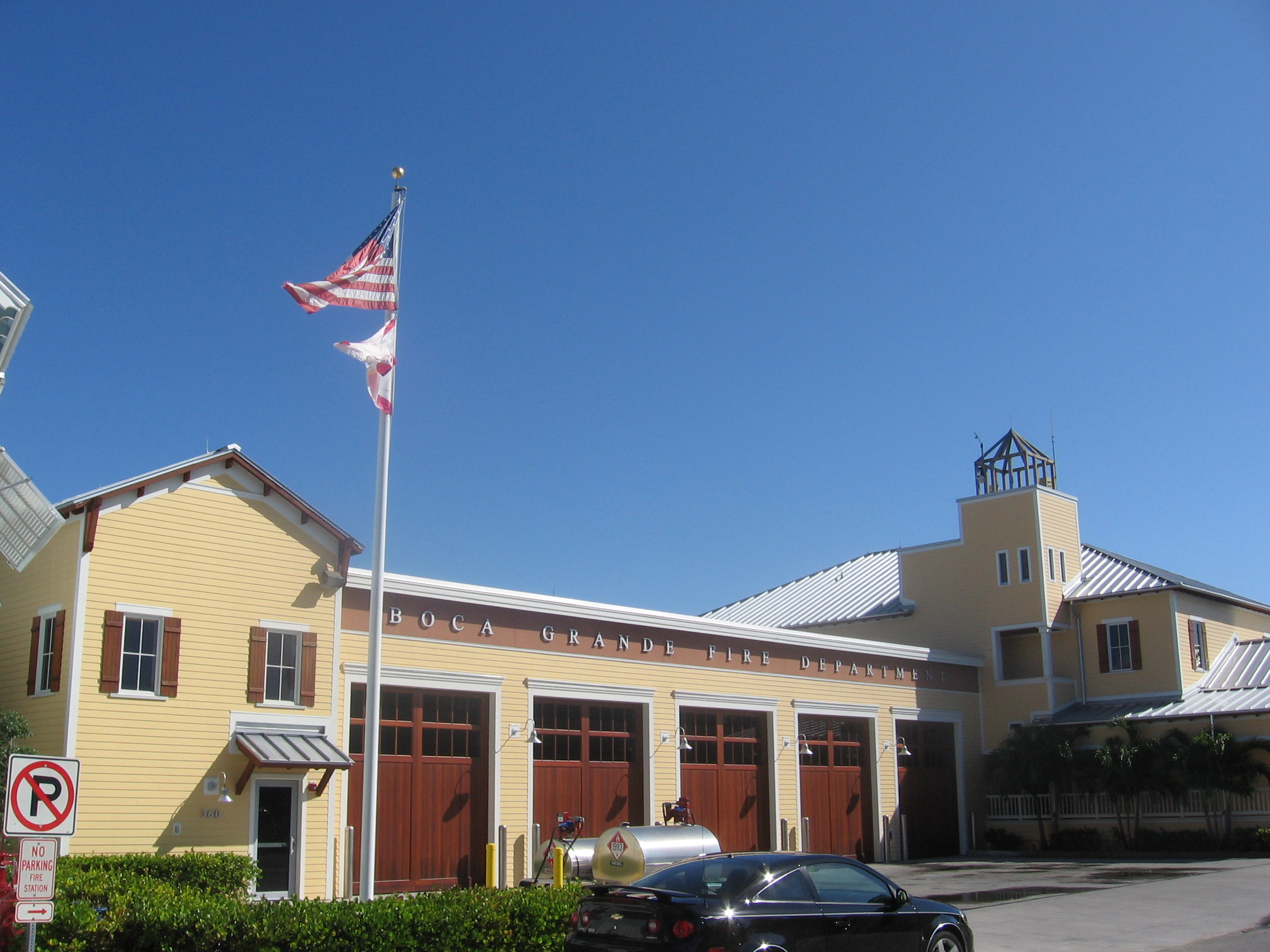
Fire Department

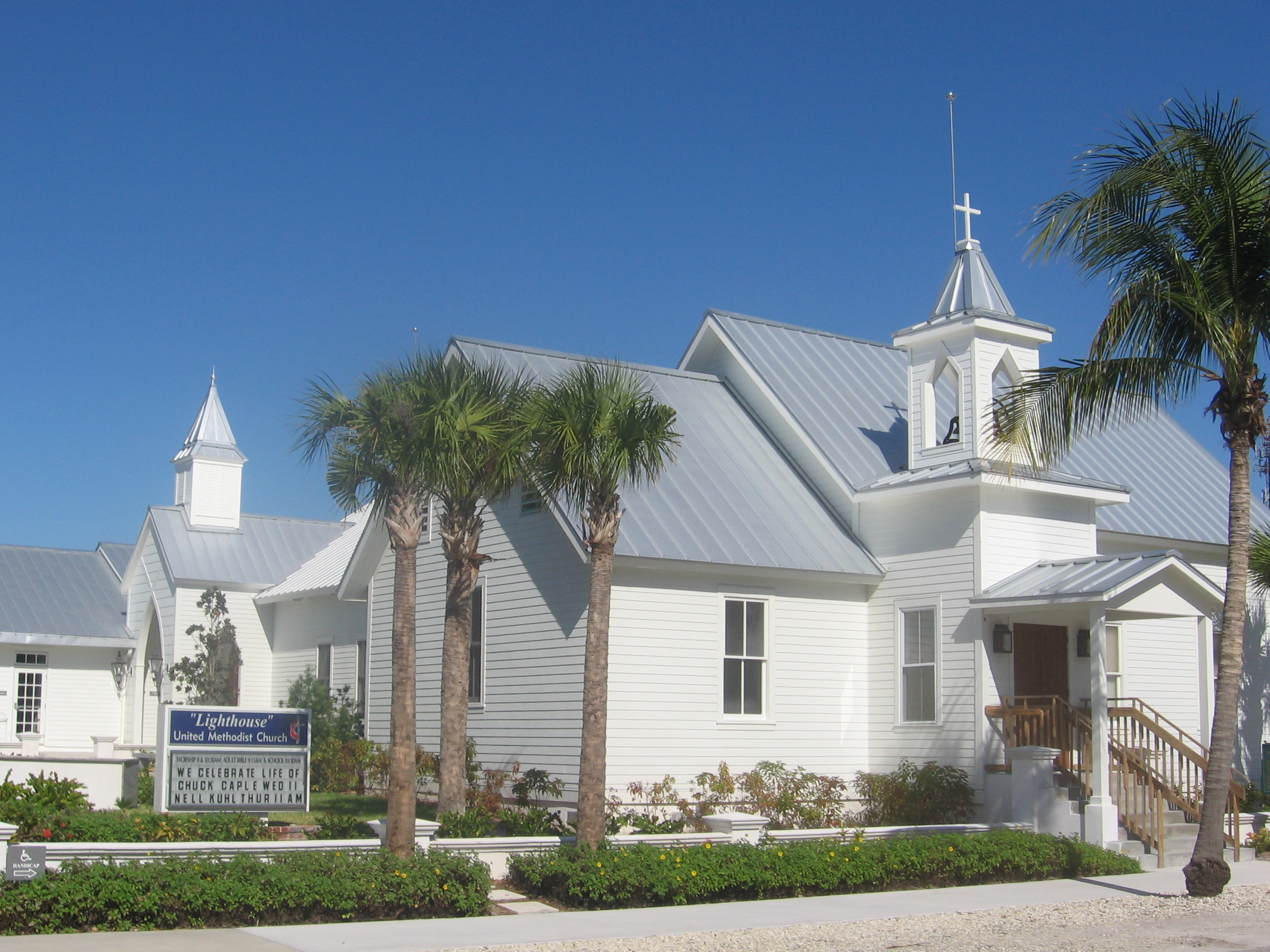
United Methodist Church

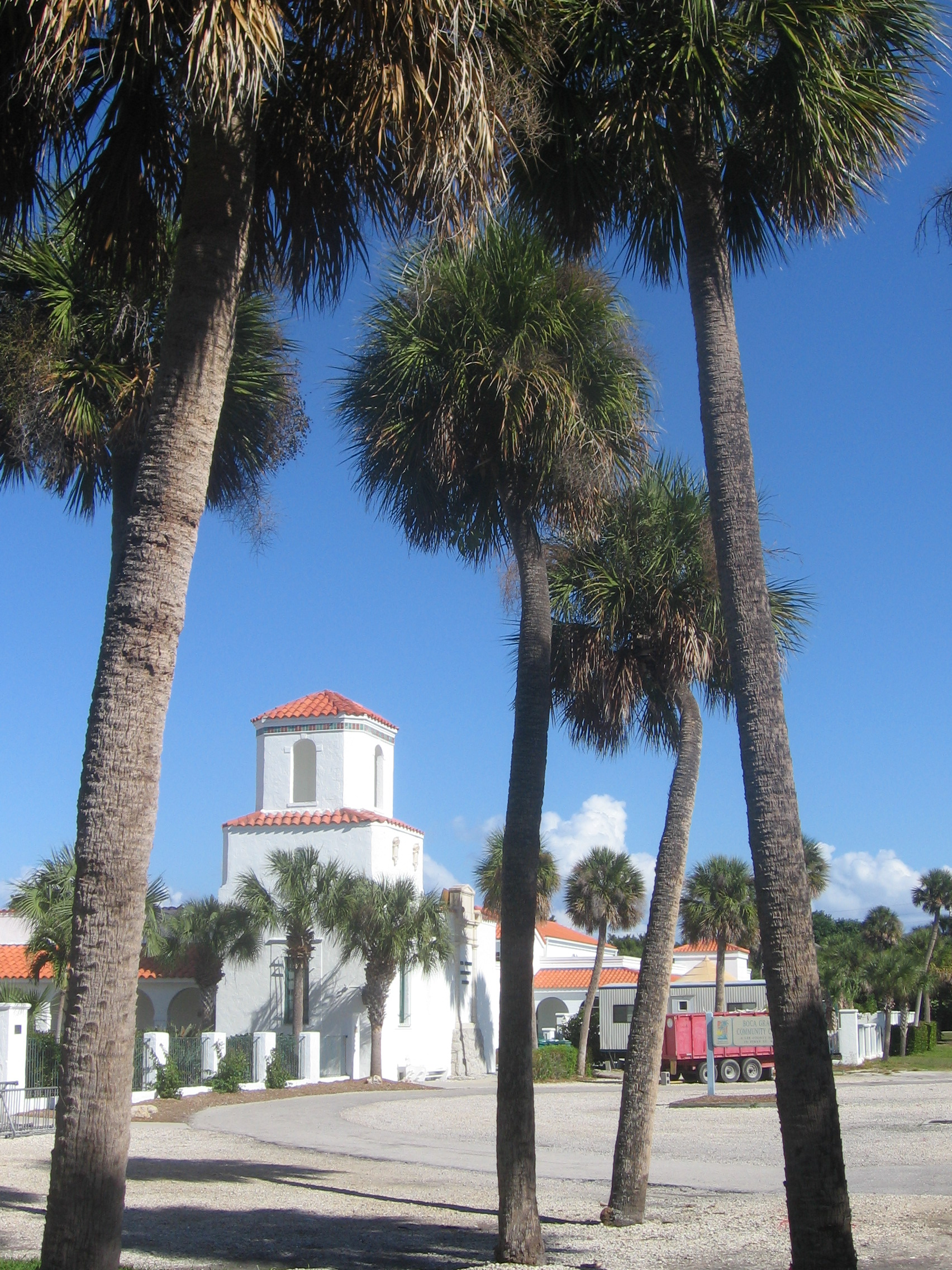
Boca Grande Community Center

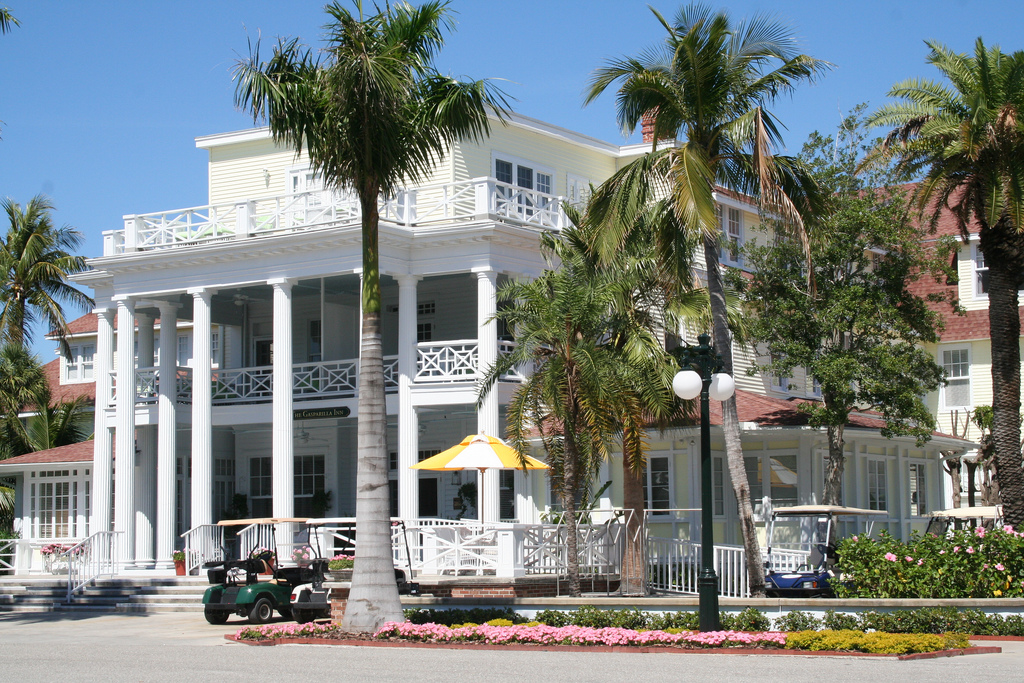
Gasparilla Inn & Club
