= José Gaspar =

Mythical Spanish pirate

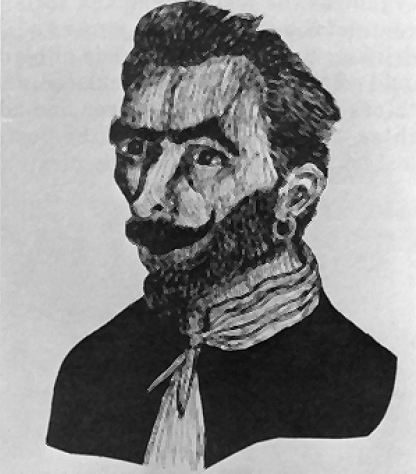
José Gaspar as illustrated in the 1900 brochure

José Gaspar, also known by his nickname Gasparilla (supposedly lived c. 1756 – 1821), is a mythical Spanish pirate who supposedly terrorized the Gulf of Mexico from his base in southwest Florida during Florida's second Spanish period (1783 to 1821). Though details about his early life, motivations, and piratical exploits differ in various tellings, they agree that the 'Last of the Buccaneers" was a remarkably active figure who amassed a huge fortune by capturing many vessels and ransoming many hostages during his long career, and that he died by leaping from his ship rather than face capture by the United States Navy, leaving behind his still-hidden treasure.

While Gaspar is a popular figure in Florida folklore, there is no evidence that he existed. No contemporary mention of his life or exploits has been found in Spanish or American ship logs, court records, newspapers, or other archives, and no physical artifacts linked to Gaspar have been discovered in the area where he supposedly established his "pirate kingdom." The earliest known written mention of José Gaspar was a short biography included in an early 20th century promotional brochure for the Gasparilla Inn on Gasparilla Island at Charlotte Harbor, the author of which freely admitted that it was a work of fiction "without a true fact in it". Subsequent retellings of the Gaspar legend are based upon this fanciful account, including the accidental inclusion of José Gaspar in a 1923 book on real pirates that has caused ongoing confusion about his historical authenticity.

José Gaspar's legend is celebrated in Tampa, Florida, during the annual Gasparilla Pirate Festival, which was first held in 1904.

== Legend ==
The story of José Gaspar's life and career has been told in many forms since the early 20th century. The accounts generally agree that Gaspar was born in Spain about 1756, served in some capacity with the Spanish Navy until turning to piracy around 1783, and died during a battle with the United States Navy off the coast of southwest Florida in 1821. However, the various narratives often conflict when describing his origins and his personal character.

=== Early years ===
The first published version of the Gaspar legend claims that he was a Spanish nobleman whose brilliant exploits helped him to rise to the rank of admiral and key advisor to King Charles III. While capable, Gaspar already harbored a piratical nature, and he masterminded the theft of the crown jewels. His crime was discovered, however, so he seized the "prize vessel of the Spanish fleet" with some loyal followers and abandoned his wife and children to flee across the Atlantic Ocean. Other versions follow a similar course but claim that Gaspar did not actually steal the crown jewels but was instead falsely accused of the crime by a jilted lover in the Spanish royal court. Unjustly facing arrest, he commandeered a ship and fled, vowing to exact revenge on his country.

Other versions of the story state that Gaspar was not of noble birth, but rather began life as a poverty-stricken Spanish youth who kidnapped a young girl for ransom. Captured and given a choice between prison and joining the Spanish navy, he went to sea and served with distinction for several years. Different versions of the story provide different explanations of why this Gaspar variant turned to piracy. Some say he was a junior officer on a Spanish frigate that fled from a fleet action with the English navy. Mortified by his captain's cowardice and disillusioned with his country, Gaspar took command by force. In some versions, he led a mutiny against a tyrannical captain, after which the grateful crew agreed to become his pirate band in exile.

=== Piratical career ===
Whatever Gaspar's origins, the various versions of his story agree that he established a base on Gasparilla Island on the uninhabited southwestern coast of Spanish Florida and turned to piracy aboard his ship, the Floriblanca. Roving across the Gulf of Mexico and the Spanish Main, he amassed an enormous fortune by preying on shipping for nearly four decades during a period coinciding with the second Spanish rule of Florida (1783–1821). Plundered vessels and cargo were sold in friendly ports, male prisoners were either put to death or forced to join his pirate band, and female prisoners were taken as captives to Captiva Island to be held for ransom or to serve as wives or concubines for the pirates.

Different versions of Gaspar's legend relate a variety of adventures over his long career, some of which appear in conflicting variations depending on the source. One of the most famous episodes involves a Spanish princess (or Mexican, depending on the version) named Useppa, who was a passenger on a captured ship. The beautiful noblewoman rejected Gaspar's advances until he killed her in a rage (in some versions, because his crew demanded her death for refusing their captain). The pirate instantly regretted the deed and buried her body on a nearby island which he named Useppa in her memory. Some versions identify the lady with Josefa de Mayorga, daughter of Martín de Mayorga, viceroy of New Spain from 1779 to 1782, and contend that the island's name evolved to its current spelling over time. However, no evidence has been found to support this claim.

Sanibel Island is similarly mentioned as being connected to Gaspar, but different versions of the story conflict on the details. While some say that it was named for Gaspar's first love, others claim that it was named by Gaspar's first mate, Rodrigo Lopez, after his lover whom he had left back in Spain. In these versions, Gaspar eventually allowed Lopez to return home and entrusted him with his personal diary and ship's logs for safekeeping. Both of these documents have been cited as key sources for information about the pirate, though neither has ever been produced.

Gaspar has been associated with various other pirates, both historical and not. Some versions of Gaspar's story claim that he often partnered with the real pirate Pierre Lafitte and that Lafitte barely escaped the battle in which Gaspar was killed. This is unlikely, as there is no record of Lafitte traveling to southwest Florida, and he died in Mexico before Gaspar's supposed demise. Gaspar has also been associated with Black Caesar, Brewster Baker, and "Old King John", other pirates found in Florida or Caribbean folklore for whom there is little to no historical evidence.

=== Death ===
Most versions of the legend agree that José Gaspar met his end in late 1821, soon after Spain transferred control of the Florida Territory to the United States. As the story goes, Gaspar had decided to retire after almost forty years of pirating, and he and his crew gathered on Gasparilla Island to split the enormous treasure cache he'd collected over his long career. During the distribution process, a lookout spotted what appeared to be a vulnerable merchant ship nearby. Gaspar could not resist taking one last prize, so he and his crew hurriedly boarded the Floriblanca to pursue their prey. However, when the pirates closed on their quarry and fired a warning shot, their intended victim raised an American flag to reveal that it was the US Navy pirate hunting schooner USS Enterprise in disguise. A fierce battle ensued in which the Floriblanca was hulled several times below the waterline and began to sink. Rather than surrender, Gaspar wrapped an anchor chain around his waist, dramatically shouted, "Gasparilla dies by his own hand, not the enemy's!", and leapt to his death in the waters of the Gulf of Mexico.

His surviving crew attempted to flee as the Floriblanca sank within sight of the shore, but most were captured and hanged, with only a handful escaping into the wilderness. Some versions of the story claim that one of the survivors was John Gómez, who would tell the tale to subsequent generations.

== Evidence ==
José Gaspar became a well-known figure in Florida folklore after 1904, when civic leaders in Tampa chose an obscure pirate legend from Charlotte Harbor (about 100 miles to the south) as a theme for the city's May Day festival. However, though the authenticity of the legend has been investigated for over a century, no evidence to support Gaspar's existence has ever been found. As Tampa Bay History Center director Rodney Kite-Powell explained, "It's impossible to prove a negative, but every effort to prove that [Gaspar] existed has come to a dead end.”

=== Historical context ===
Large-scale piracy was rare in the Gulf of Mexico during the late 1700s and early 1800s, when Gaspar was supposedly active. This was well after the "Golden Age of Piracy" (c.1650-1725), when infamous figures such as Bartholomew Roberts, Blackbeard, and William Kidd operated in and around the Caribbean Sea and Atlantic basin. European nations began a concerted effort to suppress piracy near their colonial holdings in the early 1700s, and every major pirate of the "golden age" had been killed by 1730, over a quarter century before Gaspar's supposed birth in Spain.

Scattered seaborne attacks by small bands of privateers and pirates were a continuing nuisance in the Gulf and Caribbean into the 1780s, when Gaspar is said to have arrived at Charlotte Harbor. However, the navies of Britain, France, Spain, and the newly independent United States were actively hunting the few remaining pirate bands in these waters, making it improbable that any buccaneer could brazenly operate in the area for almost four decades, especially at the scale claimed by the Gaspar legends. The original published Gasparilla story and many subsequent tales claim that the pirate had amassed the enormous sum of $30 million in stolen wealth by the time of his death in 1821. To put that figure in context, the total military budget of the United States in 1821 was about $8 million, and Spain transferred the entire Florida territory to the United States in that same year for the equivalent of $5 million.

Even during piracy's "golden age", the activities of real-world pirates of the Caribbean and Gulf almost never involved daring sea battles between pirate frigates and massive treasure ships laden with gold coins. Instead, the usual tactic was to pack as many pirates as possible into small but swift sailing vessels, seek out lightly crewed cargo ships, and quickly board targets without damaging the valuable ship or cargo. While gold and other valuables were welcome plunder, Caribbean pirates of 1700s usually sought basic trade goods such as food, tobacco, lumber and the cargo ships themselves, all of which could be sold in nearby ports without drawing unwanted attention. There were no established towns on Florida's west coast until well after Gaspar's demise, making the area unsuitable for the wholesale disposal of stolen cargo. In fact, there is little evidence that pirates of any era used Charlotte Harbor as their base of operations.

=== Archival evidence ===
Several historians and other interested parties have attempted to find records proving Gaspar's existence without success. The original version of the story claims that he stole the "crown jewels" of Spain and the "prized vessel" of the Spanish fleet during the reign of Charles III and first minister José Moñino, Count of Floridablanca, the namesake of Gaspar's highjacked ship. However, research in Spanish archives and other historical records has turned up no mention of Gaspar's presence in the royal court, his career in the Spanish navy, or his spectacular crimes.

Similarly, despite claims that he was the "most feared" pirate in the Gulf of Mexico for several decades, searches of contemporaneous American newspapers have found no mention of a pirate called "Gaspar" or "Gasparilla", and the U.S. Naval archives make no mention of Gaspar in official ships' logs or in the extensive records of piracy trials held during the era. While the USS Enterprise was assigned to the West Indies Squadron tasked with suppressing piracy in the Caribbean, it is documented to have been in Cuba in December 1821, disproving the many claims that the ship defeated Gaspar at Charlotte Harbor during that month.

==== Local place names ====
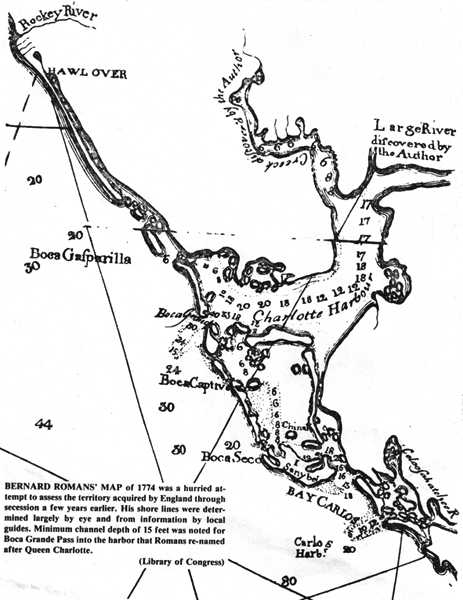
1774 English map featuring the names Gasparilla and Captiva before Gaspar's supposed arrival in the area

One constant across all versions of the Gaspar story is the claim that multiple locales in the Charlotte Harbor / Fort Myers area acquired their names from their connection to the pirate and his activities. However, most of these place names - including "Gasparilla", "Captiva" / "Captivo", and "Sanibel" / "Sanybel" - appear on Spanish and English maps published in the early 1700s, decades before Gaspar's supposed arrival in Florida.

Eighteenth century documents suggest that the true namesake of Gasparilla Island was a Spanish missionary called Friar Gaspar, who visited the native Calusa in the 1600s. And while the original version of the Gaspar legend claims that "Gasparilla" means "Gaspar, the outlaw", the -illa suffix in Spanish is actually a feminine diminutive connotating "little Gaspar" or "gentle Gaspar", leading historians to argue that the nickname seems to be more fitting for a pacifist priest than a bloodthirsty buccaneer.

=== Physical evidence ===
All versions of the Gaspar legend claim that he built an expansive hideout on Gasparilla Island, with the original written story claiming that his "pirate kingdom" consisted of a dozen or more buildings plus a "tall watchtower perched atop an ancient Indian mound filled with gold and the bleached bones of his victims." However, no physical evidence has been found to support these contentions.

Gasparilla Island is a narrow barrier island about 7 miles (11 km) long and less than 1 mile (1.6 km) across at its widest point. It was undeveloped until the late 1800s, when large phosphate deposits were discovered nearby in Bone Valley. The southern tip of the island abuts the relatively deep channel into Charlotte Harbor, so a railroad bridge and port facilities were built to ship out the material. The Charlotte Harbor and Northern Railway, which owned much of the island along with the only link to the mainland, sought to increase the value of its holdings by developing the town of Boca Grande and building the Gasparilla Inn & Club along its rail line in 1911. The nearby waters gained a reputation as an excellent area for sport fishing, and Gasparilla Island became increasingly popular with tourists and snowbirds, especially after a causeway for motor traffic was added in 1958. Additional hotels, hundreds of homes, and a golf course were built in the decades that followed, and when Port Boca Grande ceased operations in the 1970s, its footprint was converted into Gasparilla Island State Park, completing the island's transition to a tourism-based economy.

However, while virtually all of Gasparilla Island had been developed and often redeveloped by the dawn of the 21st century, no trace of José Gaspar's pirate haven, treasure, victims, or sunken ship has ever been uncovered.

=== Impact of treasure hunters ===
Over the years, the persistent belief that Gaspar was a real historical figure and unsubstantiated rumors about mysterious maps and gold coins has prompted professional and amateur treasure hunters to search for his lost cache across southwest Florida. But while no such discovery has ever been documented, unauthorized seekers have repeatedly disrupted Native American archeological sites around Charlotte Harbor, often in violation of state law. According to the Boca Grande Historical Society, the location of the principal Calusa town at Mound Key along with other historical sites in the area have suffered "unimaginable damage" at the hands of "looters in search of a non-pirate's non-treasure."

== Sources of the legend ==
By the late 1800s, Fort Myers and other coastal towns in southwest Florida had been connected to the US railroad network and were becoming modern cities. However, the nearby Ten Thousand Islands and Big Cypress Swamp to the south and east still comprised a vast and almost impenetrable sub-tropical wilderness home to a small population of mostly pioneers and recluses scattered across a few remote settlements and homesteads. Influenced by this "romantic" isolation, the region developed a colorful local folklore featuring savage native warriors, ruthless Spanish conquistadors, desperate outlaws and pirates, and the occasional Swamp Ape hiding in the trackless mangrove swamps.

The legends of a bloodthirsty local buccaneer developed in this milieu, most likely as locals wove the exploits of real Caribbean pirates of an earlier age into campfire stories and tall tales seeking to creatively explain the origins of nearby place names. Whether or not the name "José Gaspar" was used in these early stories is uncertain, but if so, his story remained so obscure that it has not been found in writing from before the early 20th century.

=== John Gómez ===
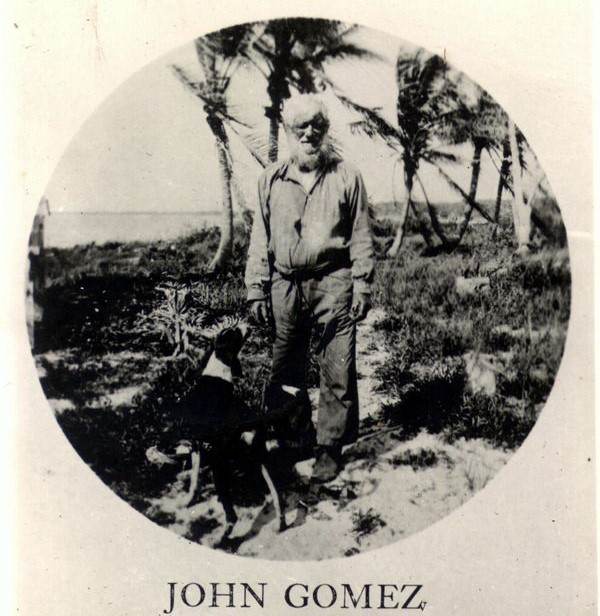
"Panther John" Gómez from Forest and Stream Magazine

John Gómez (also known as Juan Gómez and Panther John) was a real person who became entangled with the legend of José Gaspar. In the late 1800s, Gómez lived in a shack with his wife on otherwise uninhabited Panther Key, a small spit of land on the edge of the Ten Thousand Islands near Marco Island. He was well known along Florida's Gulf coast as an expert hunting and fishing guide, boat pilot, and an eccentric teller of tall tales, mostly about himself. His self-reported age and birthplace varied, even on official documents. In the 1870 United States census, he was born in 1828. However, during the 1880 US census, Gómez claimed to have been born in France in 1785. In 1885, he told state census takers that he had been born in Corsica, and he claimed in the 1900 US Census to have been born in Portugal in 1776. Meanwhile, various contemporary letters and news articles report that Gómez claimed at different times to have been born in 1778, 1781 or 1795 in Honduras, Portugal, or Mauritius. Most of his supposed birth years would have made him one of the oldest people in the world in 1900, when he died in a boating accident.

Gómez's uncertain birth was said to be just the beginning of an exceedingly long and adventure-filled life. He claimed to have seen Napoleon as a youth in France (or was drafted into Napoleon's army), sailed the world as a cabin boy on a merchant ship, served as a scout for the U.S. Army during the Seminole Wars, served as a coastal pilot for the U.S. Navy during the Civil War, was involved in filibustering (and perhaps pirating) in Central America and the Caribbean, and escaped a Cuban prison just before his scheduled execution, among other remarkable exploits spread out over the entirety of the 19th century. While none of these stories can be verified, researchers have found records indicating that Gómez lived in several locations along Florida's west coast from about 1870 until his death, including Key West, Tampa, Pass-a-Grille, and the Ten Thousand Islands.

Gómez became so well known as a fishing and hunting guide that his outdoorsman and storytelling skills were mentioned in several issues of Forest and Stream, an early conservationist magazine. His tall tales were shared to small groups in very informal settings - often on a boat or in the wilderness - and are only documented in a few personal accounts, including his obituary. However, though many versions of the Gasparilla legend claim that Gómez was the last surviving member of the pirate's crew, no contemporary account of Gómez's life or stories mention José Gaspar. The connection was made after his death in 1900, when a promotional pamphlet for a Boca Grande resort (see below) claimed that the late John Gómez was the primary source for its fantastical tale of a local pirate.

Since the publication of that brochure, many elaborate and often conflicting stories have been told regarding Gómez's alleged exploits alongside José Gaspar. Some claim that Gómez was the pirate's cabin boy, others that he was Gaspar's brother-in-law, and still others that Gómez was Gaspar's first mate while John Gómez Jr. was the pirate's cabin boy. Some even suggest that Gómez was the extraordinarily long-lived José Gaspar himself living under a false name. Most versions of the legend also claim that Gómez knew the whereabouts of Gaspar's vast treasure cache, which seems unlikely given that he petitioned the Lee County Commission for a $8 per month stipend due to "destitution".

=== Gasparilla Inn Brochure ===
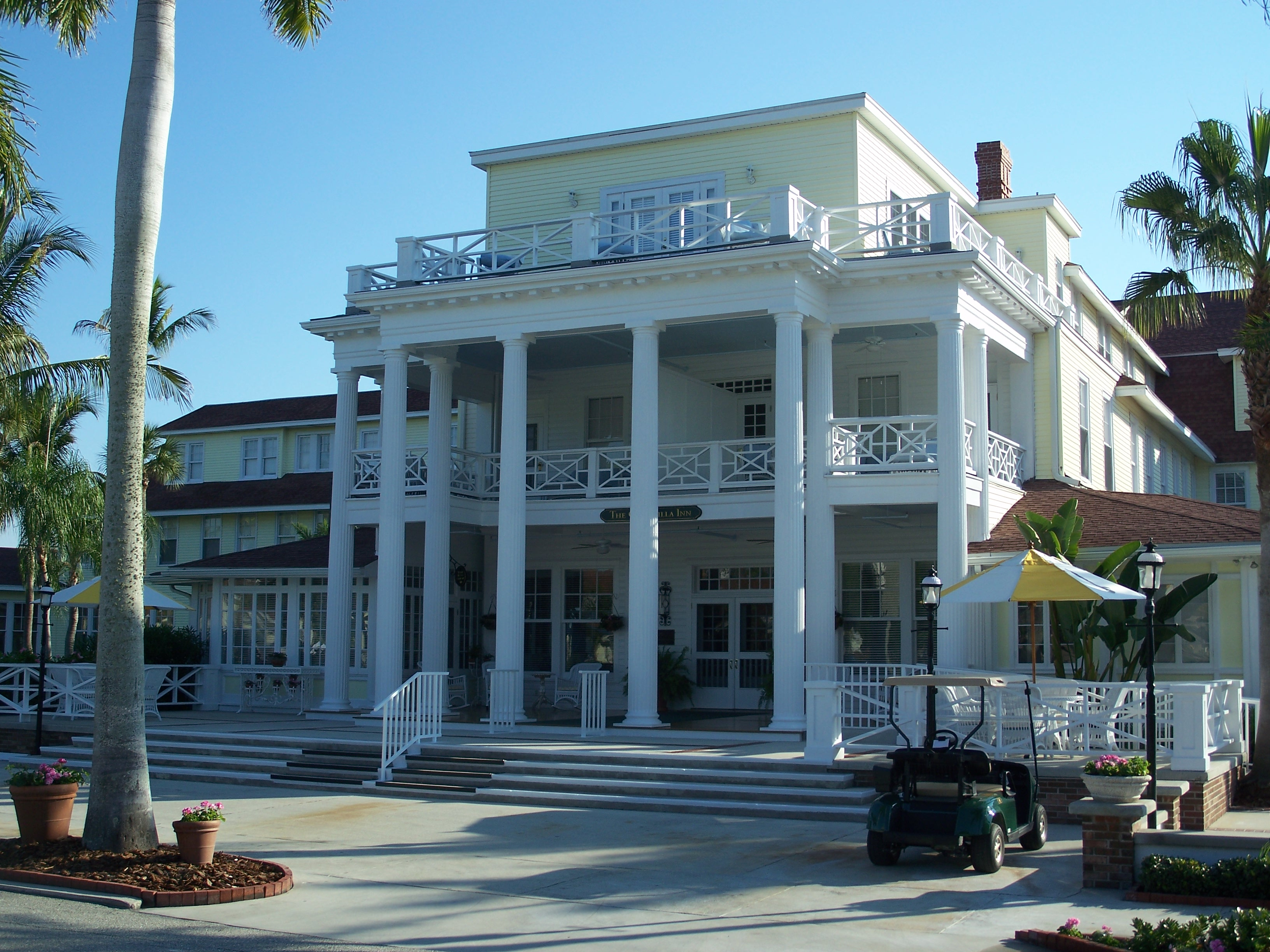
A brochure advertising the Gasparilla Inn (pictured) was the primary source of the Gaspar legend

The first written account of José Gaspar comes from an early 1900s brochure for the Gasparilla Inn Resort and Club in the recently established tourist town of Boca Grande on Gasparilla Island at Charlotte Harbor. Publicist Pat Lemoyne authored it for the Charlotte Harbor and Northern Railway Company, which had just opened the large hotel at the end of its old phosphate line.

The brochure consisted of two parts: the first printed version of the legend of José Gaspar and a longer promotional section touting the Gasparilla Inn and the Charlotte Harbor area in general. It was freely distributed to guests at the Inn and northern markets to draw attention to the recently opened tourist destination.

The cover of the brochure featured a blood-dripping color illustration of Gaspar, and the introduction claimed that the tale of the pirate contained therein was gleaned from stories told by the late John Gómez, who was described as the longest-lived member of the crew. Several episodes in Gaspar's career mentioned in the brochure have been repeated and expanded upon in later retellings, including the tale of the "little Spanish princess" and the details of his dramatic demise. The story also claimed that his sprawling "pirate kingdon" had encompassed several islands in the vicinity, saying "Taking the best of everything when a capture was made, he chose the best of the islands in Charlotte Harbor for his own secret haunts." It explained that Captiva Island was where captives were held, Sanibel Island was named after Gaspar's love interest, and his home was on Gasparilla Island, where it said that a burial mound "forty feet high and four hundred feet in circumference" had been found to contain "ornaments of gold and silver" along with "hundreds of human skeletons". As an enticement to visit, the brochure also asserted that the bulk of the buccaneer's vast cache of buried treasure "still lies unmoved" in the vicinity of the Gasparilla Inn.

Though the brochure presents its "romantic" history of Gaspar as well-established truth, it is entirely fictional. Local place names mentioned were established long before the pirate's supposed arrival, and despite lurid tales regarding the discovery of gold and human remains, no such artifacts or any other physical evidence of Gaspar's "regal" outpost, victims, or treasure has ever been found on Gasparilla Island or anywhere else in the Charlotte Harbor area.

In 1949, a retired Pat Lemoyne gave a history lecture at a Fort Myers Chamber of Commerce function in which he cheerfully admitted that his biography of José Gaspar was a "cockeyed lie without a true fact in it" and that he had written the brochure in a dramatic style that "tourists like to hear". He explained that the story had been inspired by John Gómez's tall tales, which Lemoyne had heard second-hand. Lemoyne described Gómez as a "colorful" eccentric who was known to tell "gullible" tourists that he had been a pirate so that he could sell them fake treasure maps for a "fancy figure".

=== Piracy in the West Indies and Its Suppression ===
In 1923, Boston historian Francis B. C. Bradlee received a copy of the Gasparilla Inn brochure from Robert Bradley, then president of the Charlotte Harbor and Northern Railway Company. Bradlee assumed that the story of Gaspar was true, and without any additional research or fact checking, he included the fictional pirate in a book he had been writing, Piracy In The West Indies And Its Suppression

This proportedly historical work repeated many details from the promotional brochure, including the specious claim that a mound built by a "prehistoric race" on Gasparilla Island had recently been excavated and found to contain gold and silver artifacts along with "hundreds of human skeletons" of Gaspar's victims. It also added a few details, such as an aside about a dying John Gómez admitting that he'd witnessed the murder of the "Little Spanish princess" and sketching a map that led searchers to her body. However, none of these claims were true, as no treasure, murder victims, or other physical trace of Gaspar's exploits has ever been found in the area, and John Gómez drowned while fishing alone, making a deathbed confession impossible.

Despite the obvious inaccuracies in his chapter on Gaspar, Bradlee's book was used as a source for later works such as Philip Gosse's Pirates' Who's Who and Frederick W. Dau's Florida Old and New, the authors of which also took Gaspar's authenticity for granted. Over the next few decades, several more books about pirates or Florida history erroneously included José Gaspar / Gasparilla as a real historical figure, leading to continuing confusion about his authenticity and repeated attempts to find his lost treasure.

=== Ye Mystic Krewe of Gasparilla (YMKG) ===
In 1904, Tampa Tribune society editor Louise Frances Dodge and local customs official George Hardee decided to enliven the city's May Day festival by adding a pirate theme. Hardee had lived in both New Orleans and Fort Myers, and he suggested adding elements of Mardi Gras along with a pirate "invasion" led by Jose Gaspar, whose legend was virtually unknown in the Tampa area at the time. "Ye Mystic Krewe of Gasparilla" (YMKG) was founded to organize the event, and when it proved popular, the krewe continued to stage future editions of what became known as the Gasparilla Pirate Festival.

In 1936, YMKG commissioned Tampa Tribune editor Edwin D. Lambright to write an authorized history of the organization. Along with a factual history of the krewe and the Gasparilla festival up to that point, the volume included a version of the legend of José Gaspar in which he was depicted as a "respectable" and "courtly" pirate who only resorted to violence when necessary. Lambright claimed that his biography of Gaspar was supported by "unquestionable records", including a diary written by the pirate himself and taken to Spain by a member of his crew, perhaps Juan Gómez. However, the diary was said to have been lost, and no other evidence was disclosed.

In 2004, YMKG published a new centennial history of the organization. This document recounts the Gasparilla legend first published in 1936 but adds a coda that concedes that scholarly research conducted in both Spanish and American archives had not uncovered evidence of Gaspar's existence. The history concludes with this statement:

Whether Gasparilla, the pirate, actually existed or not is a moot point. The legend exists, and that's what matters. The story of Gasparilla and his pirates has lent a certain flair of mystery and adventure to Florida's West Coast since the late 1800s. And on that legend, Ye Mystic Krewe of Gasparilla was founded 100 years ago.

=== "The Gasparilla Story" ===
In 1949, Florida author Jack Beater wrote a short novel called The Gasparilla Story which was published locally in Fort Myers. Though styled as a light adventure, the narrator claimed that it was a true tale gleaned from a "mouse-eaten Cuban manuscript" supposedly written by José Gaspar's cousin Leon and corroborated with an old map found at a used bookstore, neither of which were made public. The last few pages of the book included advertisements for hotels and real estate firms in the Charlotte Harbor area that invited readers to "Make [their] conquest of Sanibel and Captiva Islands, in the manner of the buccaneers!"

Beater wrote several additional books about southwest Florida; some marketed as fiction, some as non-fiction, and some as travel guides, most of which included tongue-in-cheek dramatic tales about Gaspar and other dubious local legends. His most widely distributed works on the topic were The Sea Avenger, a mass-market paperback version of Gasparilla's adventures co-written with MacLennan Roberts and published by Dell in 1957, and Pirates and Buried Treasures of Florida, a volume which combined his 1949 Gasparilla story with other similar tales. Pirates and Buried Treasures was initially published in 1959 and was updated and republished several times in subsequent years.

Beater's works inspired other local authors and folklorists to write on similar themes, continuing to popularize and expand Gaspar's legend while sowing further confusion about his status as a fictional figure.

=== "The Hand of Gasparilla" ===
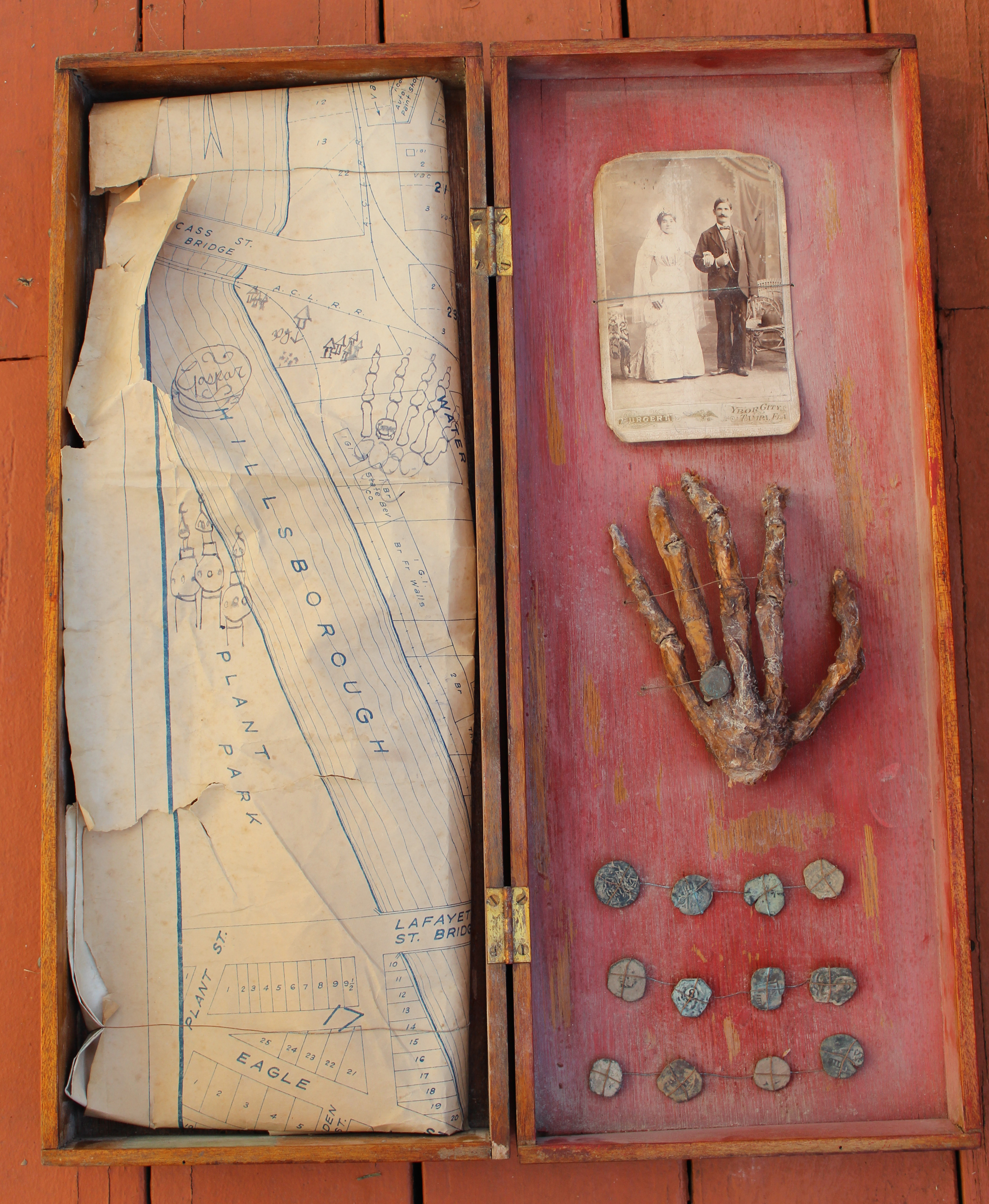
Box allegedly containing Gaspar's hand and related items

In the 1930s, Ybor City resident Ernesto Lopez showed his family a mysterious box he claimed to have found while working as part of a crew repairing the Cass Street Bridge in downtown Tampa. According to family stories, the wooden box contained a pile of gold coins, a severed hand wearing a ring engraved with the name "Gaspar", and a "treasure map" indicating that the pirate had buried a chest near the bridge on the banks of the Hillsborough River.

In 2015, Lopez's great-grandchildren discovered a box in their late grandfather's attic appearing to contain the items Ernesto Lopez had found along with his wedding photo. The family brought the box to the attention of a local TV reporter, whose feature on the strange objects was picked up by several national and international news outlets. However, upon examination, experts at the Tampa Bay History Center determined that the box contained several non-precious old coins, souvenirs from early Gasparilla parades, and a plat map from the 1920s or 1930s with local streets, businesses, and landmarks clearly depicted. The origin of the hand remained a mystery, though the curator of the history center opined that it might be a mummified monkey hand.

== Legacy ==
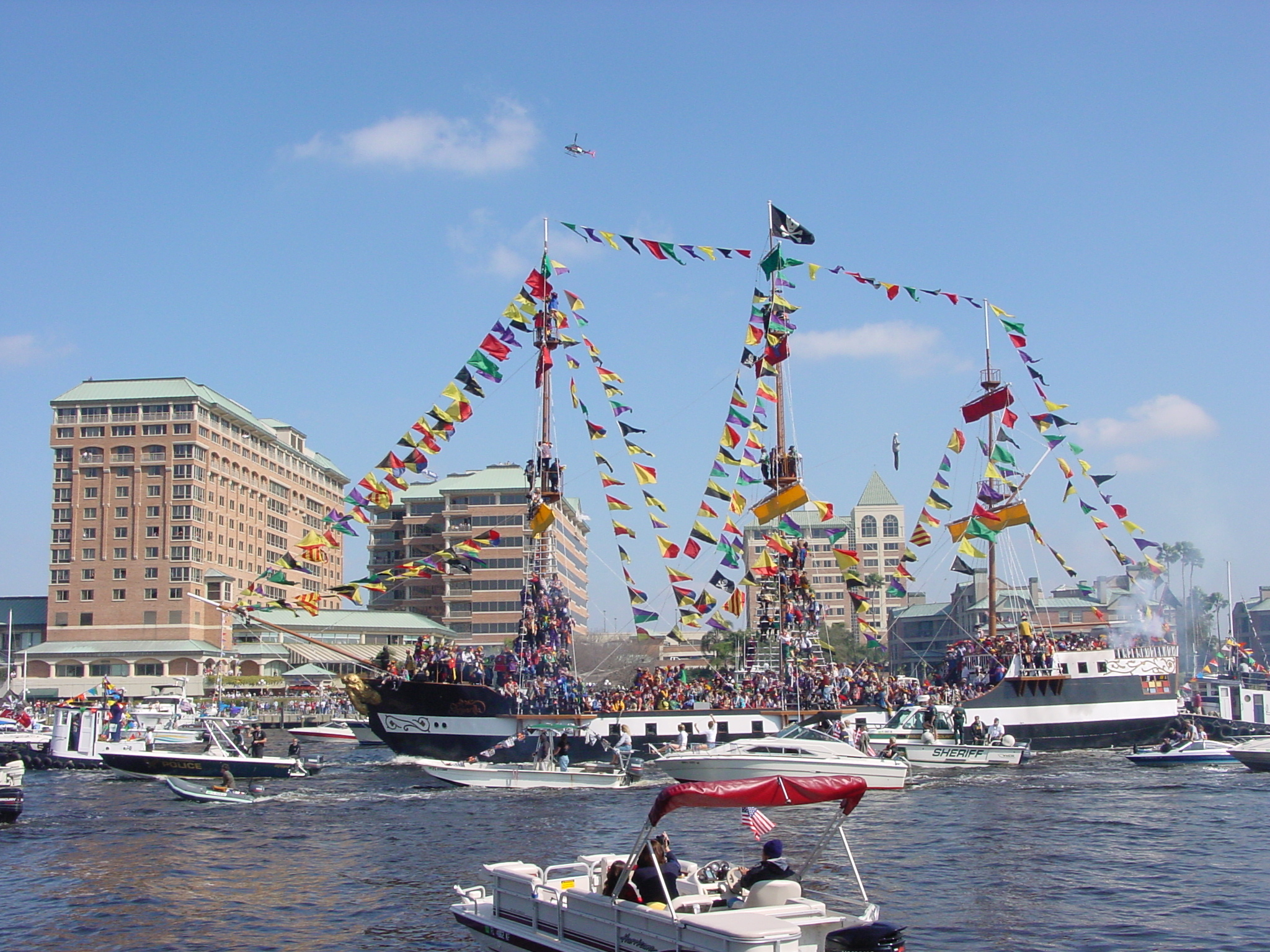
The pirate ship José Gasparilla II sailing into downtown Tampa during the 2003 Gasparilla Pirate Festival

=== Gasparilla Pirate Festival ===
Well over 100 editions of the Gasparilla Pirate Festival has been held in Tampa since the first pirate "invasion" in 1904. Under the guise of "Ye Mystic Krewe of Gasparilla" (YMKG), an organization modeled after krewes of Mardi Gras in New Orleans, members don pirate costumes, sail across Tampa Bay to downtown Tampa on the José Gasparilla II (a 165' long "pirate" ship specially built for this purpose in 1954) and demand that the mayor surrender the key to the city. The playful ceremony is followed by a large "victory parade" down Bayshore Boulevard which includes dozens of other krewes and over 300,000 onlookers, making it one of the largest annual parades in the United States. The formerly one day event has grown into a Gasparilla Season in which Tampa hosts several other parades and large community events from approximately the beginning of the year through March.

=== Cultural connections ===
- Since no one organization controls the names "Gaspar" or "Gasparilla", they are used by many businesses, organizations, and events in the greater Tampa Bay area. Others have names inspired by the mythical pirate, most notably the Tampa Bay Buccaneers of the National Football League, who began play in 1976. Another sports-related example is the Gasparilla Bowl, a college football bowl game which has been played at the Bucccaneers' home field of Raymond James Stadium since 2018.
- The legend of Gasparilla has been featured in several television shows and publications. Recent examples include September 2019 episodes of the TV series Expedition Unknown on the Discovery Channel and Code of the Wild on the Travel Channel, both of which followed amateur treasure hunters (unsuccessfully) searching for Gaspar's treasure in the Charlotte Harbor area.
