= Don Pedro Island State Park =

State park in Florida, United States

Don Pedro Island State Recreation Area
- IUCN category IV (habitat/species management area)
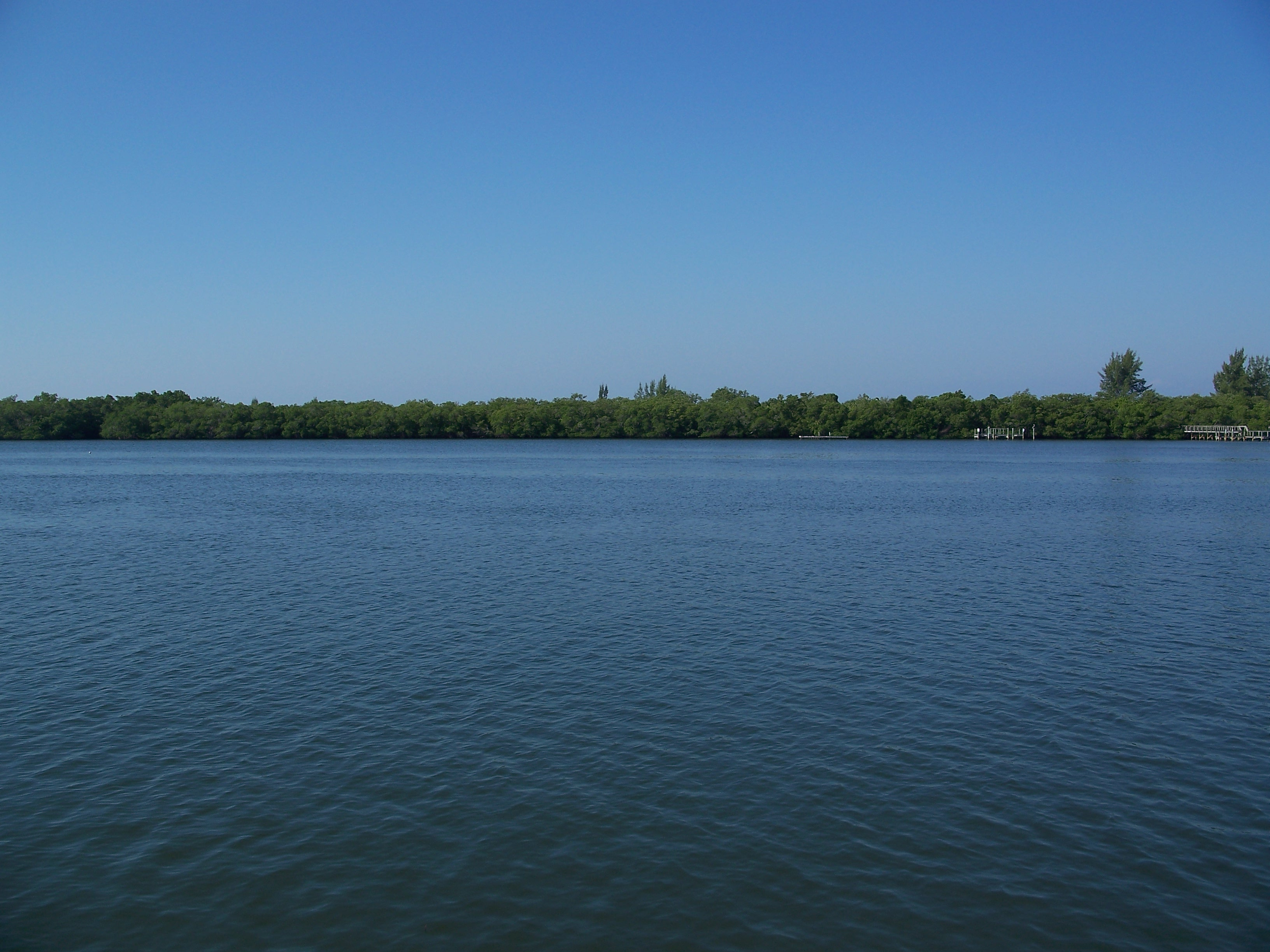
- View of the island from the water

- Location within Florida Location within the United States
- Interactive map of Don Pedro Island State Recreation Area
- Location: Charlotte County, Florida, United States
- Nearest city: Boca Grande, Florida
- Coordinates: 26.8577°N 82.3004°W
- Established: 1985
- Governing body: Florida Department of Environmental Protection

Don Pedro Island State Recreation Area is a state park in the U.S. state of Florida. It is located on a stretch of Don Pedro Island, a 129-acre (0.52 km^{2}) barrier island lying across the Intracoastal Waterway from Placida in Charlotte County, between Palm Island and Little Gasparilla Island.

== Overview ==
The park has mangrove forests, dunes and white beaches. Among the wildlife of the park are loggerhead turtles. Amenities include beaches, docks, and picnic areas as well as guided nature talks and walks.

The island portion of the park is accessible only by boat. The park also includes a 100-acre (40 ha) mainland area on the Cape Haze Peninsula, with a kayak launch, fishing dock, nature trails and picnic shelter. The park is open from 8:00 am till sundown year round.

Activities include swimming, sunbathing, shelling and viewing nature.

== Gallery ==
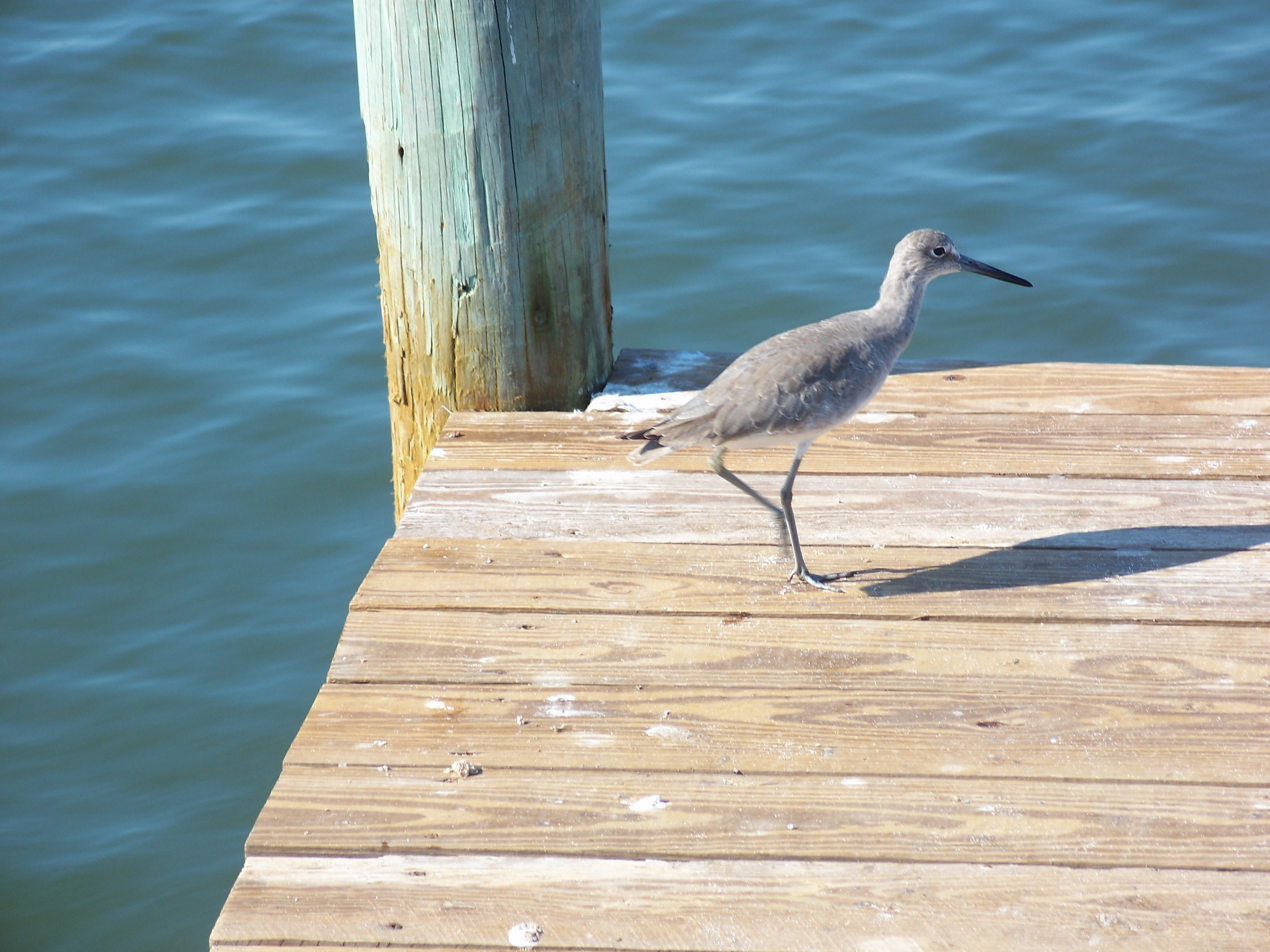
Willet

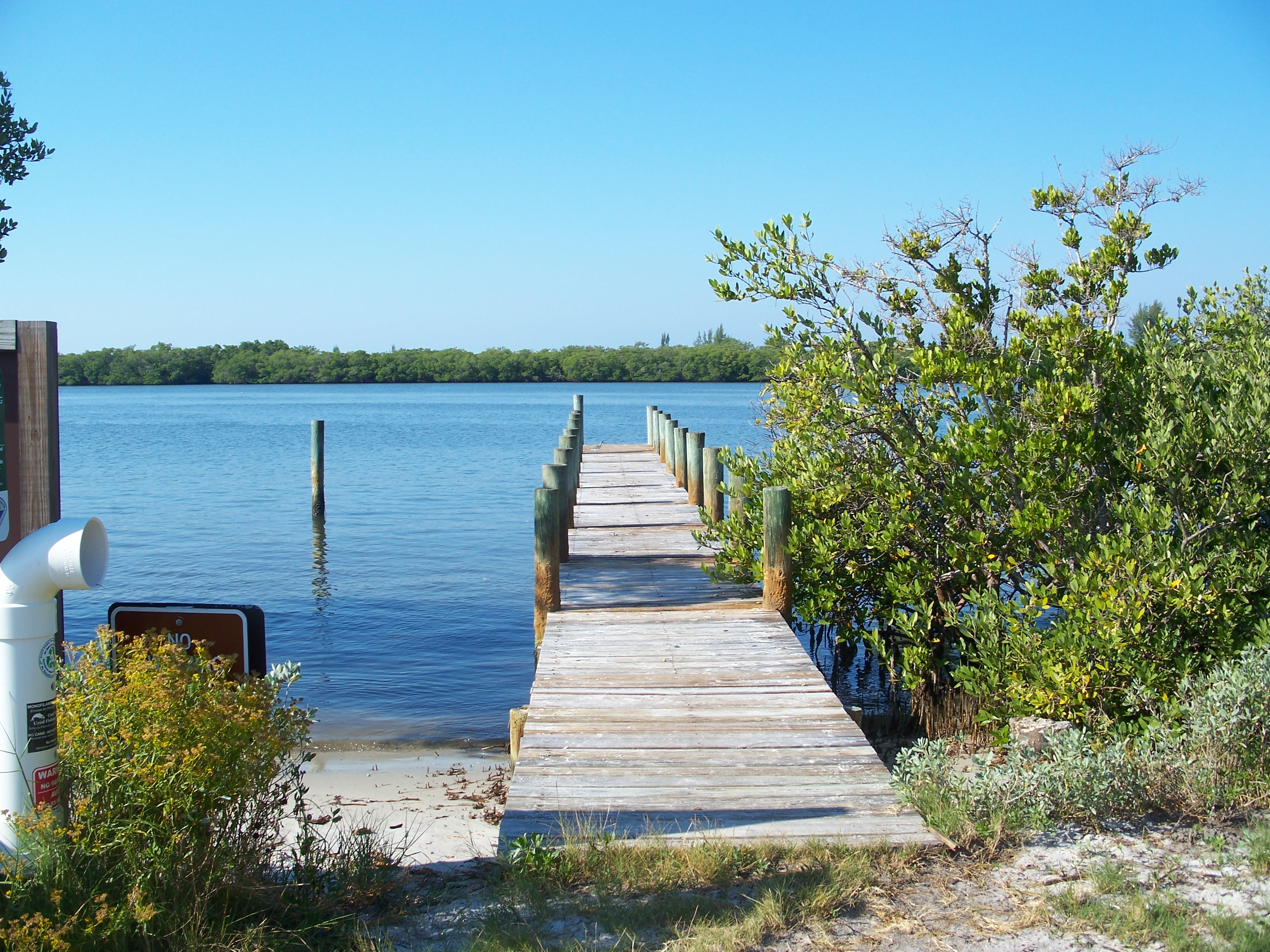
Dock
