= Black Caesar =

Black Caesar can refer to:

- Black Caesar (film), a 1973 blaxploitation film
  - Black Caesar (album), the film soundtrack by James Brown
- Black Caesar (pirate) (died 1718), an African pirate
- John Caesar (1764-1796), the first Australian bushranger, nicknamed "Black Caesar"
- Henri Caesar, a Haitian pirate nicknamed "Black Caesar"
- Frank Matthews (drug trafficker) (born 1944), an American drug trafficker nicknamed "Black Caesar"
