= Gasparilla Island Lights =

Lighthouses on Gasparilla Island, Boca Grande, Florida, U.S.

Boca Grande Lighthouse
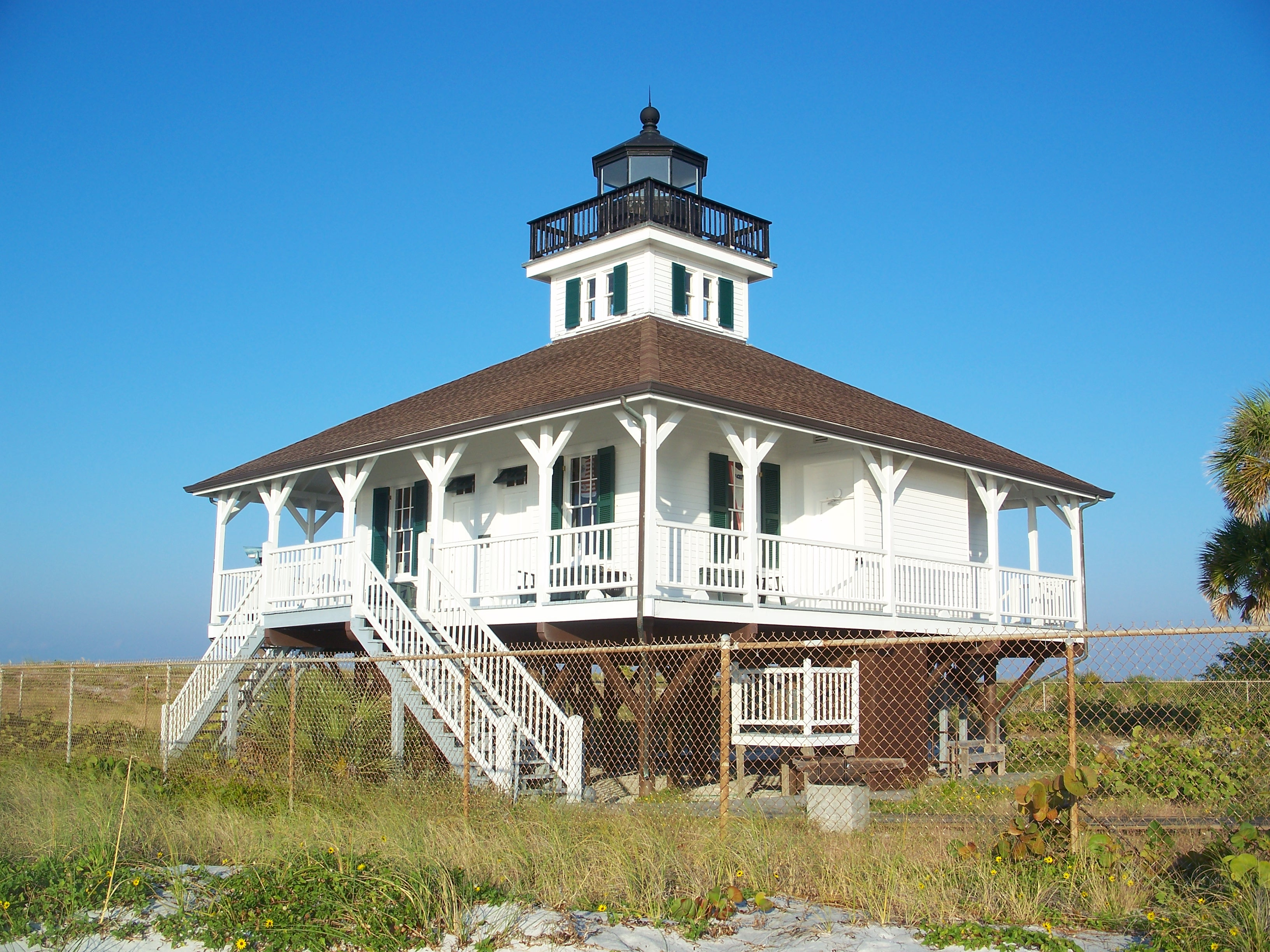
- The Port Boca Grande Lighthouse is still active as an aid to navigation and has also been restored and houses a museum and gift shop.
- Location: south tip of Gasparilla Island, on the Boca Grande Pass
- Coordinates: 26°43′02.5″N 82°15′39.4″W

Tower
- Constructed: 1890
- Foundation: iron screw piles
- Construction: wood frame
- Automated: 1956
- Height: 44 feet (13 m)
- Shape: octagonal lantern at roof peak of a square house
- Heritage: National Register of Historic Places listed place

Light
- First lit: 1890
- Deactivated: 1966, reactivated 1986
- Focal height: 13 m (43 ft)
- Lens: three and a half order Fresnel lens
- Range: 12 nmi (22 km; 14 mi)
- Characteristic: white light flashes every 20 seconds
- Port Boca Grande Lighthouse
- U.S. National Register of Historic Places
- Location within Florida Location within the United States
- Location: Gasparilla Island
- Coordinates: 26°43′2″N 82°15′39″W
- NRHP reference No.: 80000953
- Added to NRHP: February 28, 1980

Gasperilla Island Lighthouse
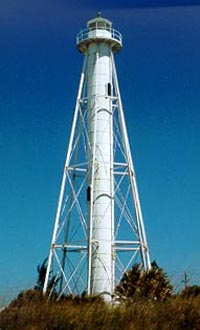
- The Gasparilla Island Rear Range Light was first lit in 1932.
- Location: 2 miles north of Port Boca Grande Lighthouse
- Coordinates: 26°44′31.4″N 82°15′48.8″W

Tower
- Foundation: iron steel piles
- Construction: wrought iron
- Automated: 1956
- Height: 105 feet (32 m)
- Shape: skeletal tower

Light
- First lit: 1932
- Deactivated: 2014, reactivated 2018
- Lens: fourth order Fresnel lens
- Range: 10 nm (red sector)
- Characteristic: white light with red sector, 6 second isophase period

The Gasparilla Island Lights are on Gasparilla Island in Boca Grande, Florida. The Port Boca Grande Lighthouse is on the southern tip of Gasparilla Island (located in Gasparilla Island State Park), and marked the Boca Grande Pass entrance to Charlotte Harbor.

== Port Boca Grande Lighthouse ==
Port Boca Grande Lighthouse was first lit on December 31, 1890. It is a two-story frame dwelling raised on iron screw-piles, with the lantern placed in a cupola at the peak of the roof. The keeper lived in the lighthouse. A similar house (without a lantern) built next to it was the assistant keeper's dwelling.

The Port Boca Grande Lighthouse originally served ships transporting cattle from ports on Charlotte Harbor to Cuba. Phosphate ore from the Peace River area became an important cargo in the 1890s, and the construction of the Charlotte Harbor and Northern Railway to Port Boca Grande in 1909 resulted in increased traffic. Ship traffic to Port Boca Grande peaked at more than 30 ships a day during World War II, when Port Boca Grande served as a safe harbor for shipping in the Gulf.

The Gasparilla Island Light was deactivated in 1966, and abandoned by the Coast Guard in 1969. The buildings quickly deteriorated, and by 1970 beach erosion had exposed the screw-piles supporting the building, with waves breaking under the building at high tide. Two rock groins were built to protect the lighthouse, and sand was pumped in to build up the beach. Lee County took title of the lighthouse in 1972. On February 28, 1980, the lighthouse was placed on the National Register of Historic Places. Restoration work began in 1985, and in 1986 the light was recommissioned.

In 1988 the building and surrounding property were turned over to the State of Florida and became Gasparilla Island State Park. In 1999 the Historic Port Boca Grande Lighthouse and Museum opened to the public and is operated by the Barrier Island Parks Society.

The light is considered an Aid to Navigation and the lamp room is maintained by the U.S. Coast Guard Station St. Petersburg Aids to Navigation Team.

== Gasparilla Island Light ==
The Gasparilla Island Light was originally constructed in 1885 to serve as the Delaware Breakwater Range Rear Light. Due to erosion, the light was decommissioned in 1918. The tower was disassembled in 1921, and reassembled on Gasparilla Island in 1927. However, the light was not lit until 1932, when it began service as the rear entrance range light for Port Boca Grande, with the front entrance range light approximately one mile off shore in the Gulf of Mexico. When the two lights, which flashed at different rates, lined up, the ships' navigators knew it was time to turn to enter Boca Grande Pass. Though the front range has been removed, the Boca Grande Rear Range Light remains in service today as the Gasparilla Island Light. It is an Aid to Navigation and is maintained by the U.S. Coast Guard Station St. Petersburg Aids to Navigation Team.

The Gasparilla Island Light was decommissioned by the Coast Guard in 2014, and the lighthouse was transferred to the Barrier Islands Parks Society in 2016. The society commissioned a restoration of the lighthouse, including the installation of a replica of its original fresnel lens. Starting in April 2017, the tower opened for climbing a few days per month, except in August when the temperature inside the tower can be over 100 degrees. The light was switched on again in 2018.

The light flashes every six seconds.

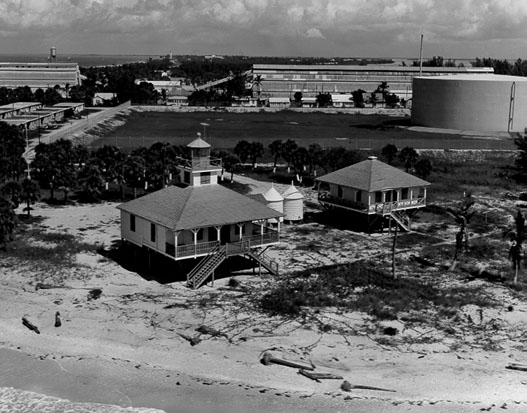
Gasparilla Island Lighthouse, U.S. Coast Guard Archive

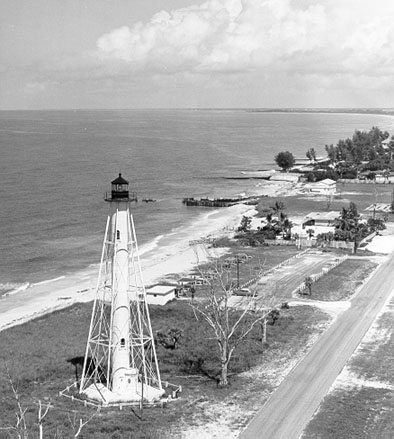
Gasparilla Island Rear Range Light, U.S. Coast Guard Archive

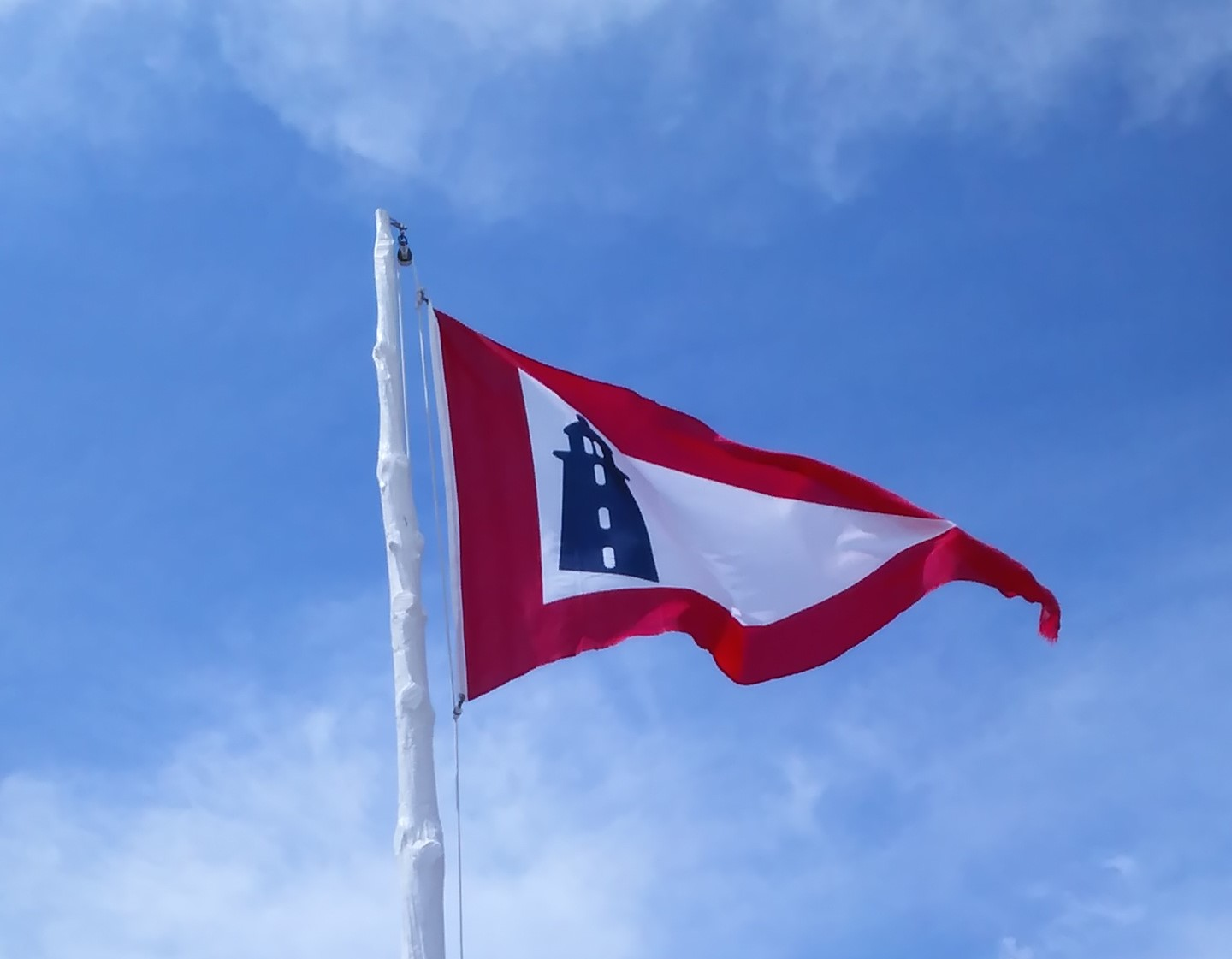
The flag found nearby the two lights

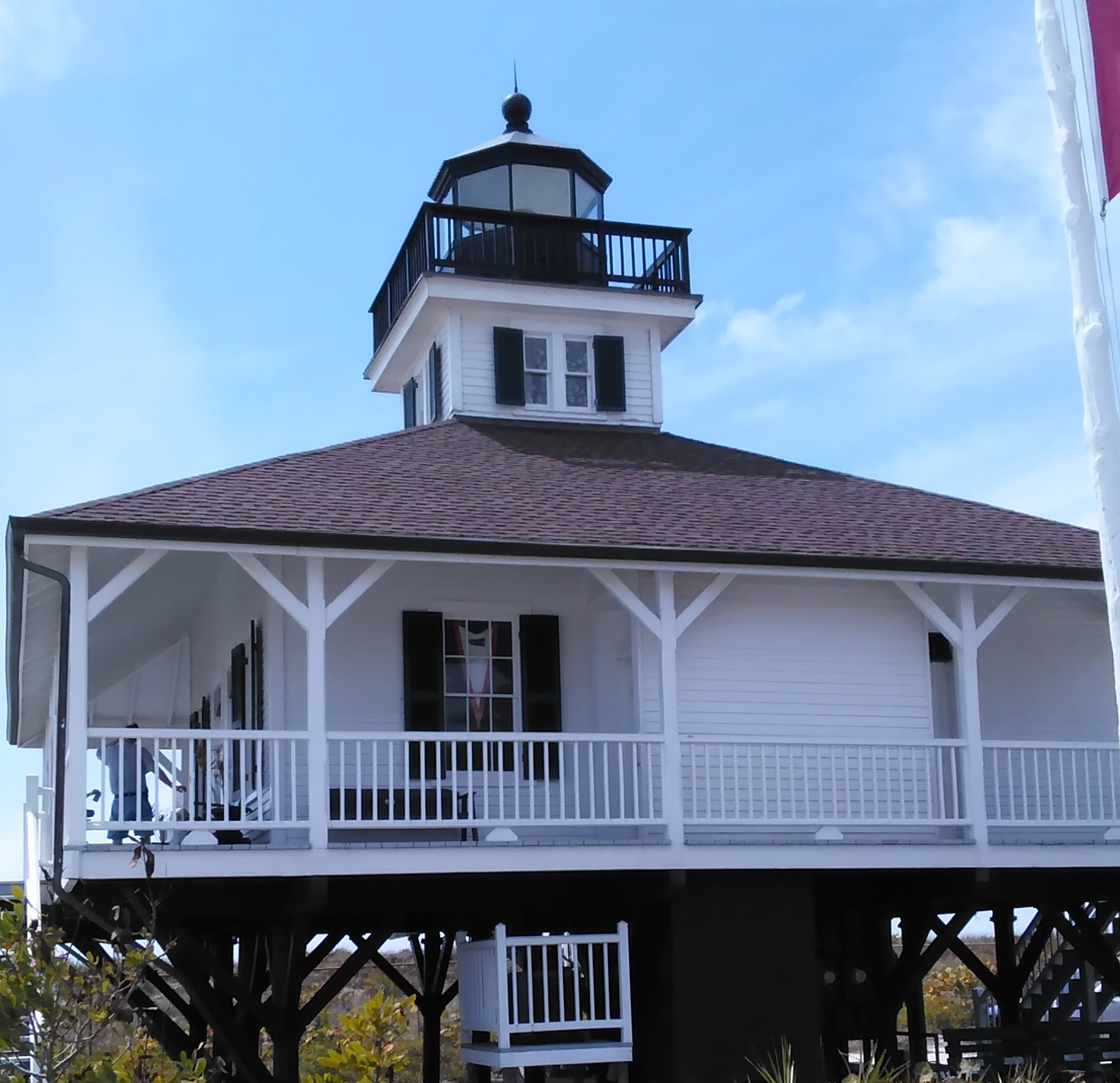
The main lighthouse, containing the gift shop now
