= Don Pedro Island =

Island in Charlotte County, Florida, United States

Coordinates: 26.872545°N 82.320299°W

Don Pedro Island is a barrier island in southwest Florida, in Charlotte County. It is just north of Little Gasparilla Island, separated by a thin strip of beach and mangrove swamp. It lies west of the census-designated place Rotonda West, separated by a narrow channel.

Don Pedro Island is part of the archipelago of islands which include Little Gasparilla Island, Knight Island and Thornton Key. The islands are often referred to as Palm Island due to the resort on the northern part of the archipelago. These islands were originally separated by narrow inlets that ran from the gulf to the intracoastal channel, which separates them from the mainland. As a result of beach replenishment projects, these inlets have been closed off with the formation of a continuous beach that now connects them. This archipelago which now resembles one island is separated from Stump Pass Beach State Recreation Area by Stump Pass to the north. It borders the Gulf of Mexico to the west. Don Pedro Island State Park is located on the island.

There is no bridge to the island. It is only accessible by boat or car ferry. There are many private residences on the island and much of the island is taken up by the Palm Island Resort. There is only one restaurant on Don Pedro, Rum Bay Restaurant, located on the north end of the island. The only small general store on the island is located on the first floor directly below the Rum Bay restaurant.

The island has an abundance of wildlife. There are a number of indigenous gopher turtles, snakes and rabbits. There is also quite a variety of birds including osprey, pelicans, great blue herons, frigate birds, woodpeckers and owls. The beaches are well known for their abundance of shark teeth and shells.

== History ==
For thousands of years Native Americans lived in and around Charlotte Harbor. During the 1700s and 1800s, Spanish fishermen fished the area waters.

After years of changing ownership, Don Pedro Island was sold to Cavanaugh Community Corp. in 1969. They built the pavilion and docks on the southeastern portion of the island.

In 1985, the property was purchased by the state. The Don Pedro Land Base, acquired in 1999, adds 100 acres of recreational opportunities to the park.
