= Gasparilla Inn & Club =

- Gasparilla Inn Historic District
- U.S. National Register of Historic Places
- U.S. Historic district
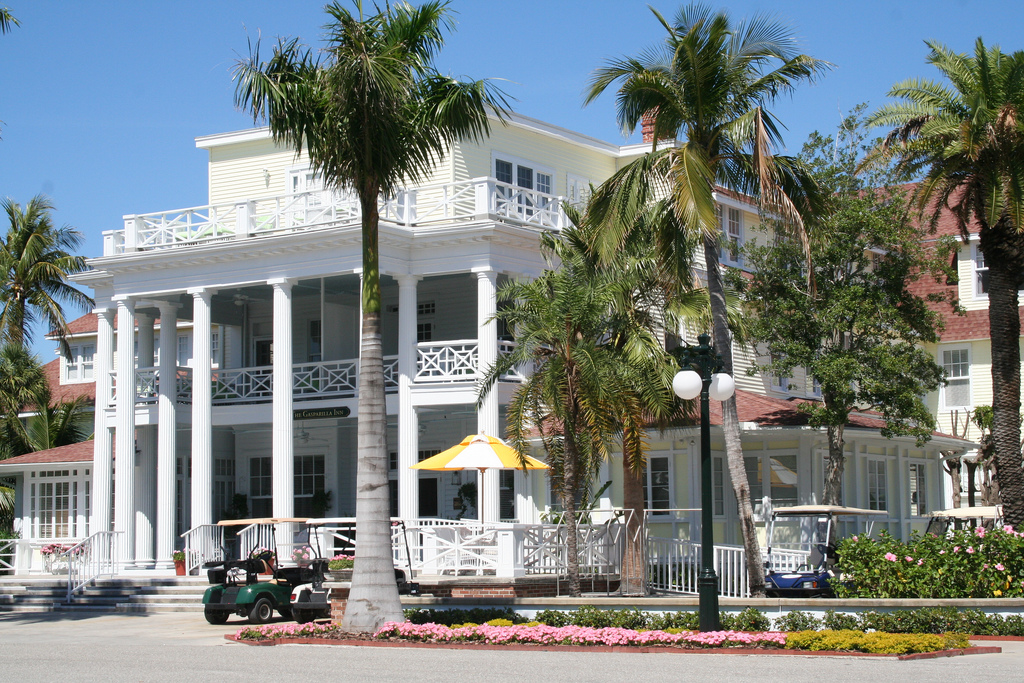

- Location within Florida Location within the United States
- Location: 500 Palm Ave., Boca Grande, Florida, USA
- Coordinates: 26°45′8″N 82°15′39″W
- Area: 25 acres (10 ha)
- Built: 1912
- Architect: Francis Kennard
- Architectural style: Classical Revival
- NRHP reference No.: 08000205
- Added to NRHP: March 18, 2008

The Gasparilla Inn & Club is a historic hotel at 500 Palm Avenue on Gasparilla Island in Boca Grande, Florida.

The Gasparilla Inn is one of the largest surviving resort hotels in Florida, constructed originally for wealthy northerners in the early 20th century, during the time when the state became a travel and vacation destination.

The inn is a two-and-a-half-story hotel building. Its first section was built in 1911; it was expanded in 1912 and in 1915. The hotel opened to guests in 1913 after sufficient construction made the structure habitable. Its Classical Revival-style portico was added around 1931. Its original beach club was destroyed in a hurricane in 1921; the new beach club was added in 1928, and an 18-hole golf course was added next.

The Gasparilla Inn Historic District is a 25 acres (10 ha) historic district which was listed on the National Register of Historic Places in 2008. It includes the inn, ten guest cottages built between 1915 and 1933, "two housekeeping maintenance sheds, also constructed in 1933, and two historic sites, a croquet court, and holes five and six of the historic 18-hole golf course both of which were constructed c. 1930 on the grounds at the rear of the Inn."

It includes, as non-contributing resources, the Mallet Club Croquet House and croquet courts to the northeast of the Inn and north of holes five and six of the golf course. The Croquet House incorporates a section of what was originally the Fletcher House, moved in the 1980s from Gilchrist Avenue in Boca Grande.

The hotel is a member of the Historic Hotels of America.
