= Gasparilla Island =

Barrier island in southwest Florida, US

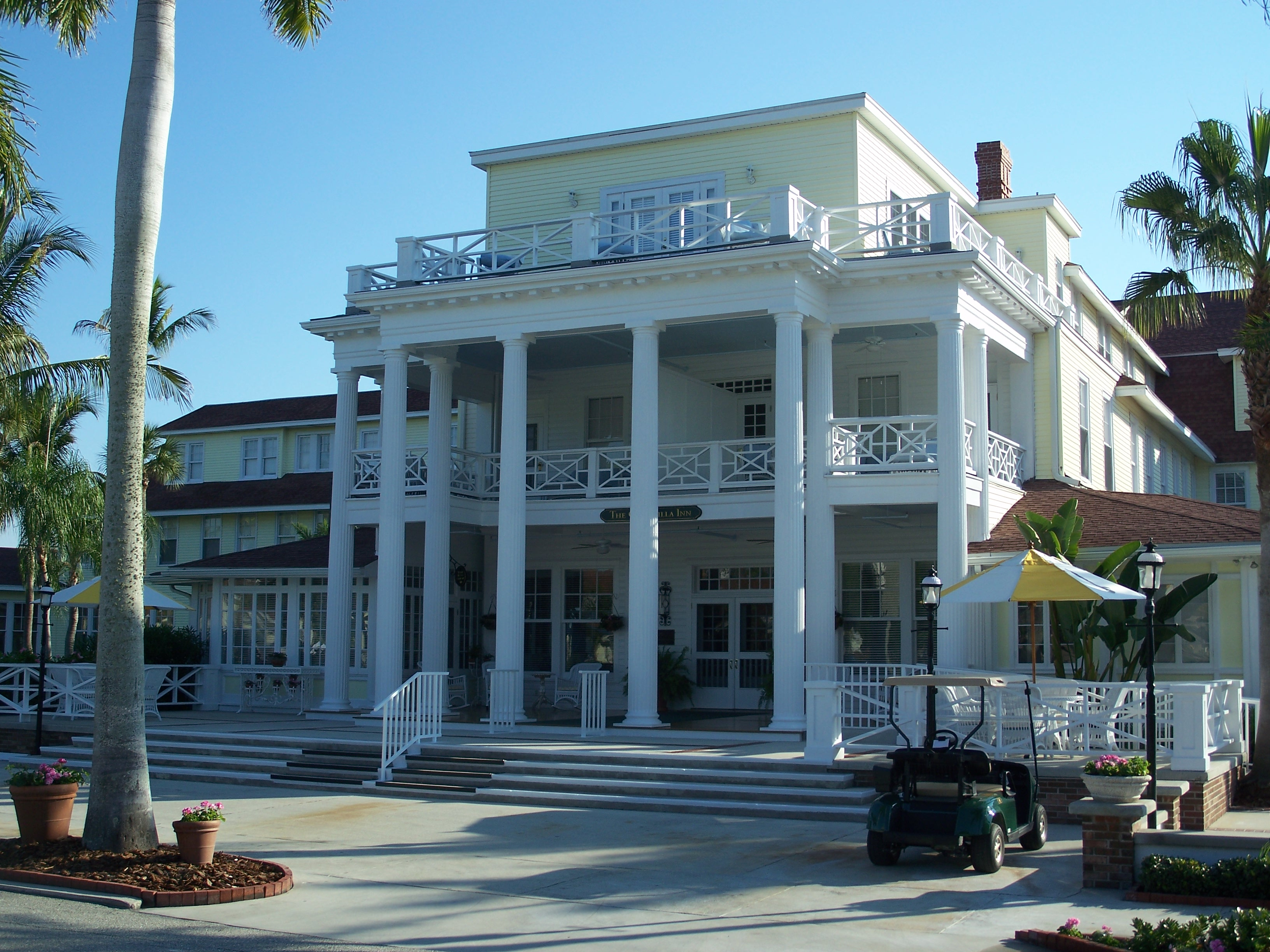
- The Gasparilla Inn in Boca Grande, Gasparilla Island

- Gasparilla Island Gasparilla Island (the Caribbean)
- Interactive map of Gasparilla Island

Geography
- Location: Lee County, Florida
- Coordinates: 26.76427°N 82.26543°W
- Adjacent to: Gulf of Mexico

Administration
- United States
- State: Florida
- County: Lee

Gasparilla Island is a barrier island in southwest Florida, United States, straddling the border of Charlotte and Lee counties. Its largest town is Boca Grande, and it is the location of Gasparilla Island State Park. The island has been an important part of Florida folklore due to its connection to the pirate Gasparilla (José Gaspar), and it has been a significant tourist destination since the early 20th century.

== Location ==
Gasparilla spans the border of Charlotte and Lee counties in Southwest Florida. To the west is the Gulf of Mexico, and to the east and south is Charlotte Harbor. To the north is Gasparilla Pass, separating Gasparilla from Little Gasparilla Island and the mainland.

== History ==
Gasparilla was sparsely inhabited until the late 19th century, with the only permanent residents being local fishing families. In 1848, the United States military established an outpost at Boca Grande. In 1897 Albert W. Gilchrist, a future governor of Florida, purchased land at Boca Grande and platted it for development as a town.

According to Florida folklore, Gasparilla Island gets its name from the legendary pirate captain José Gaspar ("Gasparilla", c. 1756–1821), who had his base on the island and purportedly hid his fabulous treasure there. Much of the development of this legend is the result of promotion by a local hotel and railroad line. The folklore account does not appear in writing until about 1900 when it was included in an advertising brochure for the Charlotte Harbor and Northern Railway company. This brochure was given to the guests of the Boca Grande Hotel. It mentions that Gaspar's massive treasure, hidden somewhere on the island, had never been found. The version of the Gasparilla story told in the pamphlet influenced all later accounts, but it is likely apocryphal. The name Gasparilla appears on maps dating to well before the time of the buccaneer; anthropologist Andre-Marcel d'Ans suggests it was named for a Spanish missionary named Gaspar or Gasparillo.

In 1905, harbor dredging began, and a Charlotte Harbor and Northern Railroad line was constructed, connecting Boca Grande to the outside world. Afterward Gasparilla was an important stop for phosphate shipping, and it remained so until the dredging of the Port of Tampa in the 1970s. In 1911, the first hotel, the Gasparilla Inn, opened, and the island became a major vacation destination for affluent people from Tampa and Fort Myers. Although shipping has declined substantially since the last quarter of the 20th century, tourism remains important to the island's economy.

The Wall Street Journal selected Gasparilla Island as one of the 10 Best Places for Second Homes.
