= Gasparilla Island State Park =

State park in Florida, United States

- IUCN category IV (habitat/species management area)
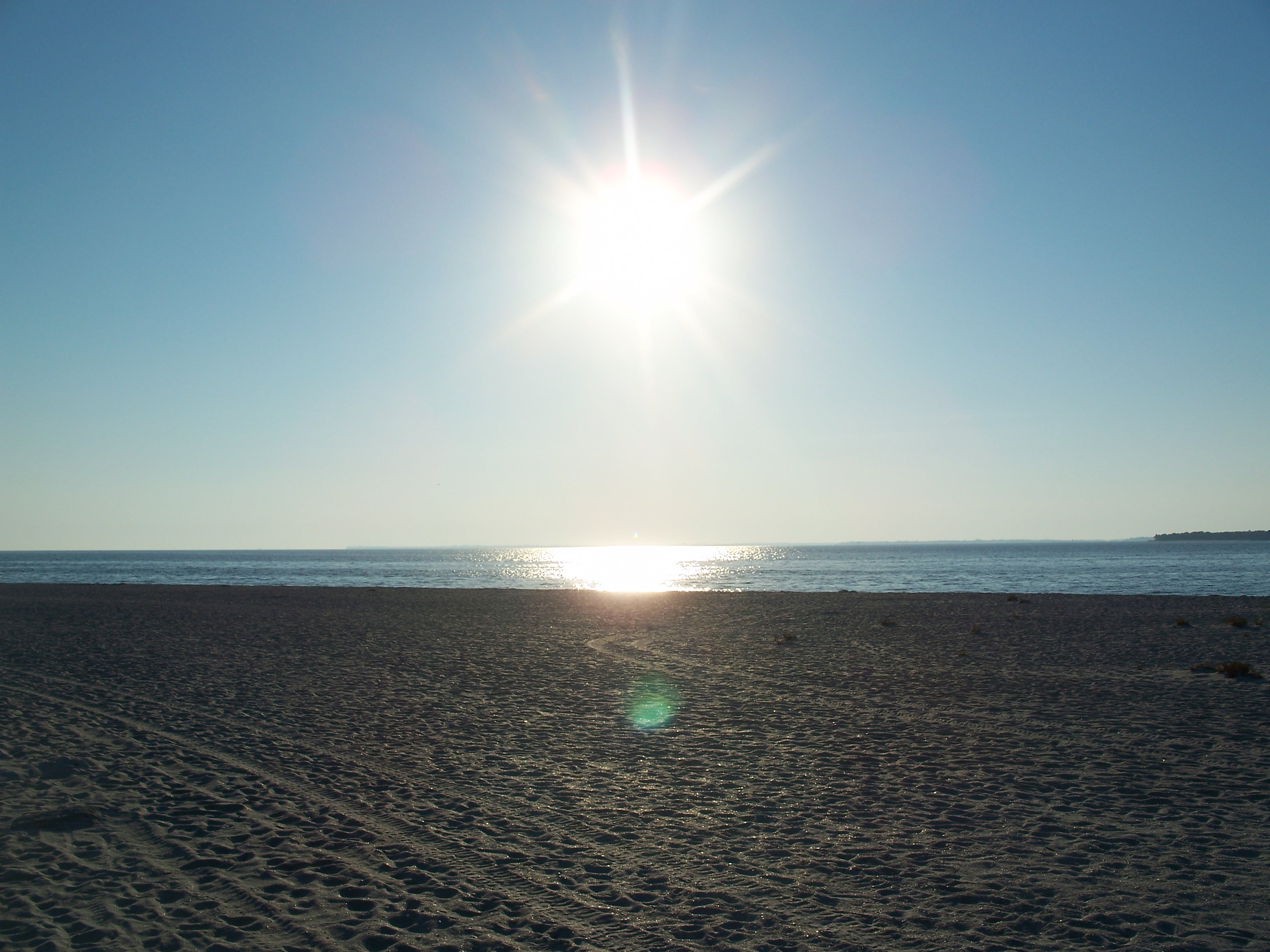
- Beach at the park

- Location within Florida Location within the United States
- Interactive map of Gasparilla Island State Park
- Location: Charlotte and Lee counties, Florida, USA
- Nearest city: Boca Grande, Florida
- Coordinates: 26°43′19″N 82°15′40″W
- Established: 1983
- Governing body: Florida Department of Environmental Protection

Gasparilla Island State Park is a Florida State Park located south of Boca Grande on Gasparilla Island off Charlotte Harbor and Pine Island Sound. Activities include swimming and fishing along with shelling, picnicking, and viewing the Historic Port Boca Grande Lighthouse.

Among the wildlife of the park are West Indian manatee, gopher tortoise, bald eagle, osprey, least tern, royal tern, Sandwich tern, and black skimmer.

== Amenities ==
Amenities include four parking lots, two picnic areas with covered tables, beaches, and Historic Port Boca Grande Lighthouse on the southern end of the island. The Port Boca Grande Lighthouse contains a museum and gift shop, and is run by the Barrier Island Park Society, a nonprofit that supports the Gasparilla Island State Park.

The lighthouse museum covers the history of the Calusa, the island’s phosphate industry and tarpon fishing in Boca Grande Pass. It also has a hands-on display of local bones, fossils and shells.

== Gallery ==
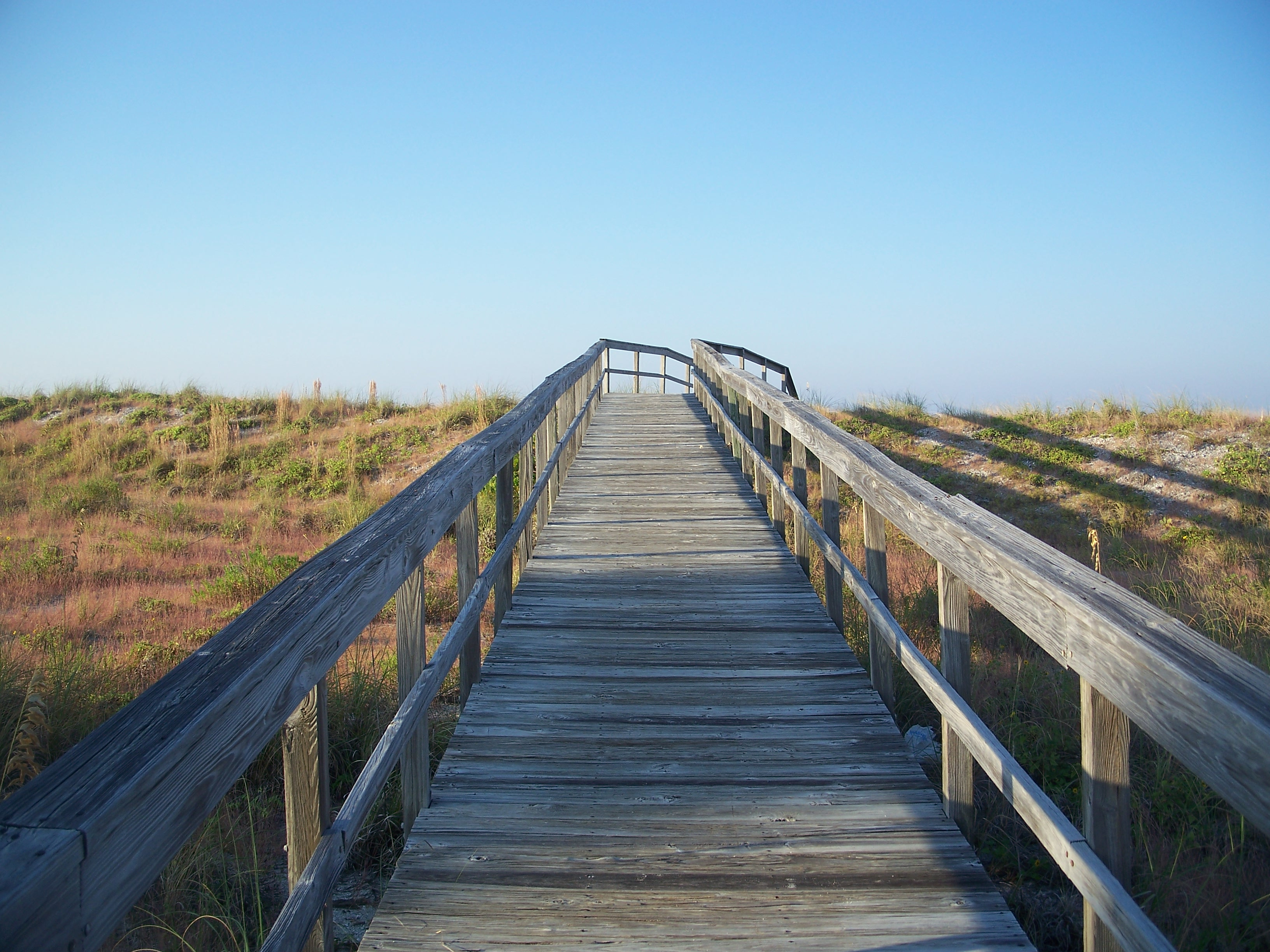
Boardwalk over dunes

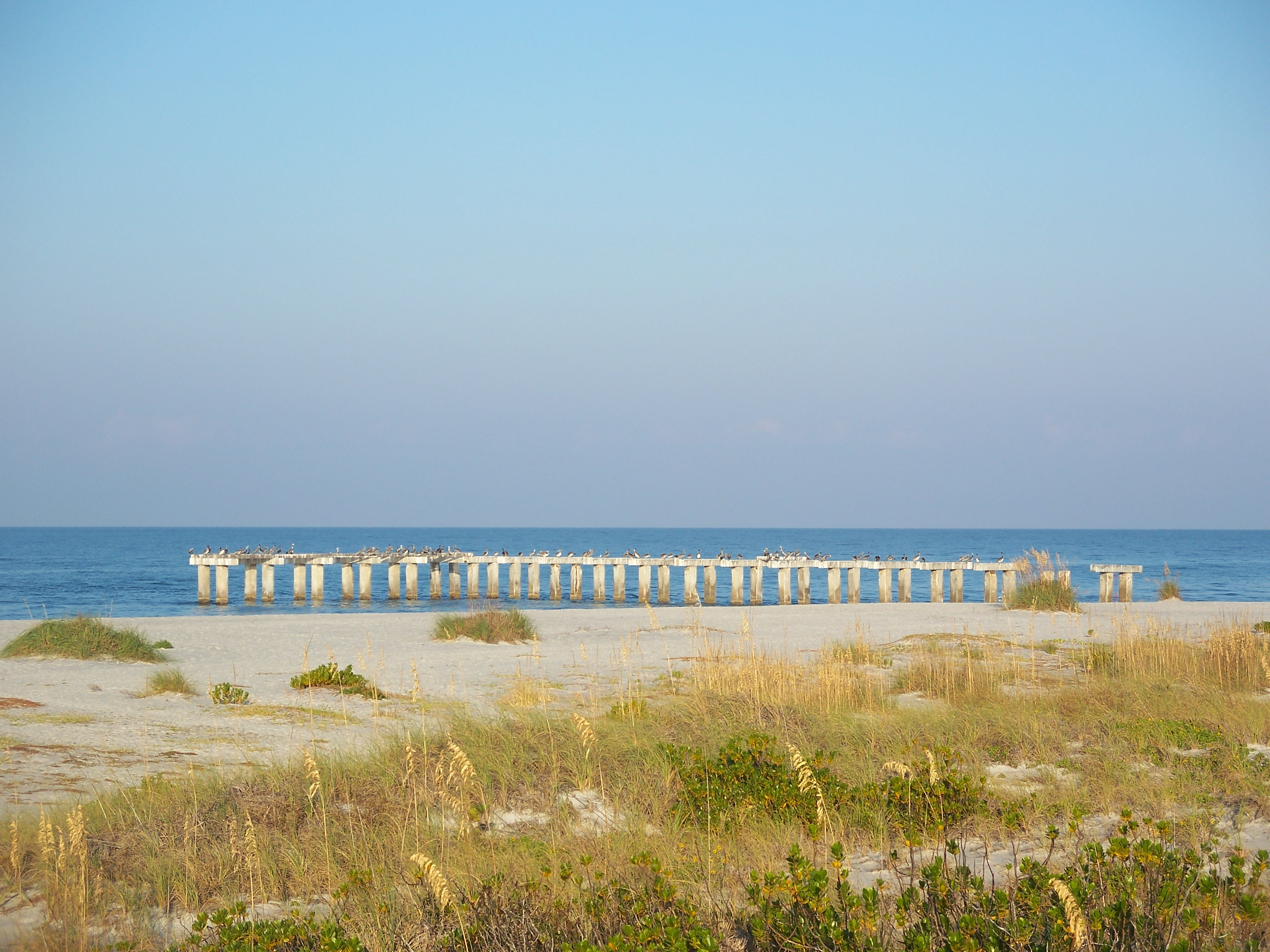
Birds resting on pier

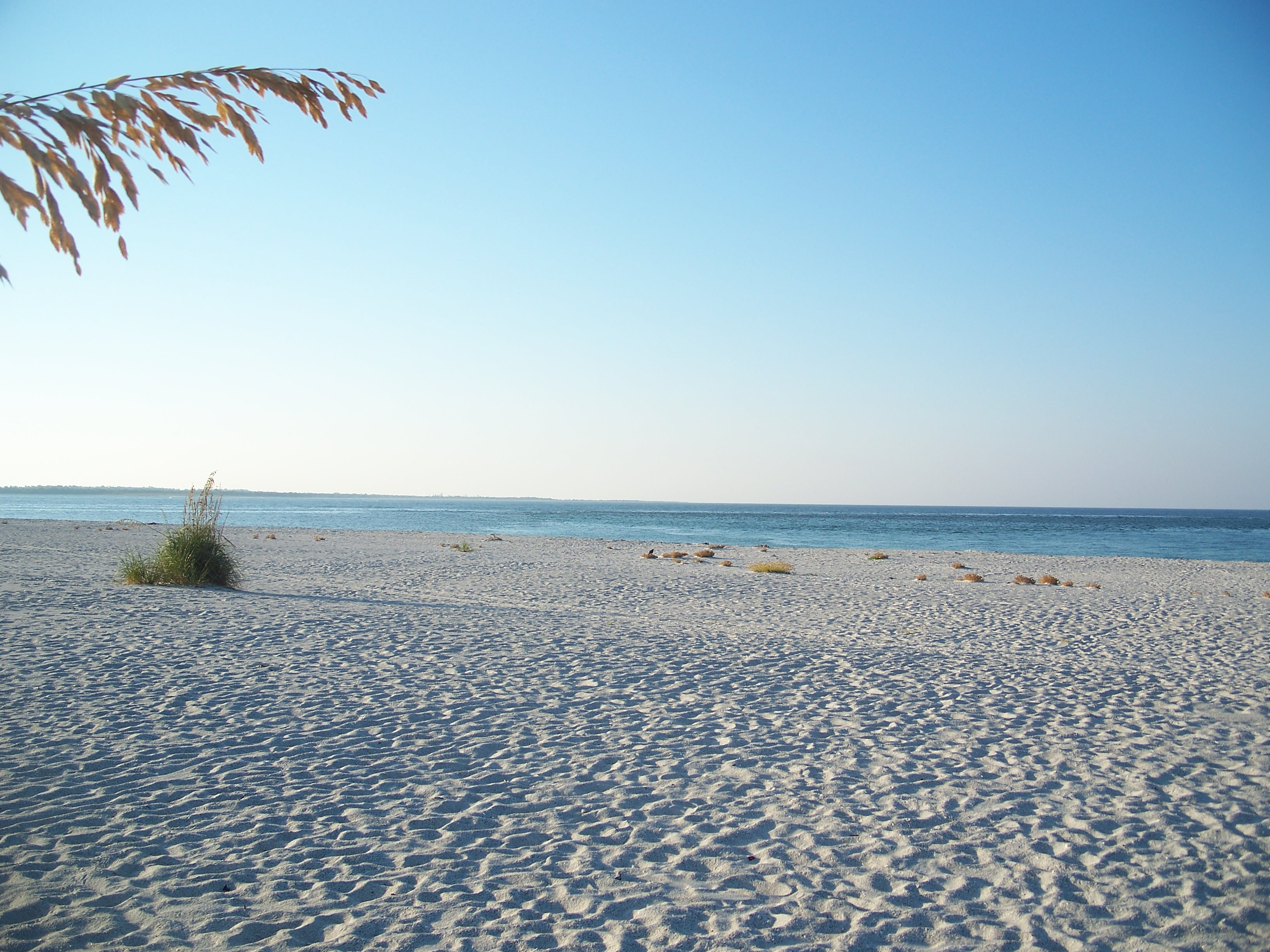
Another view of the beach

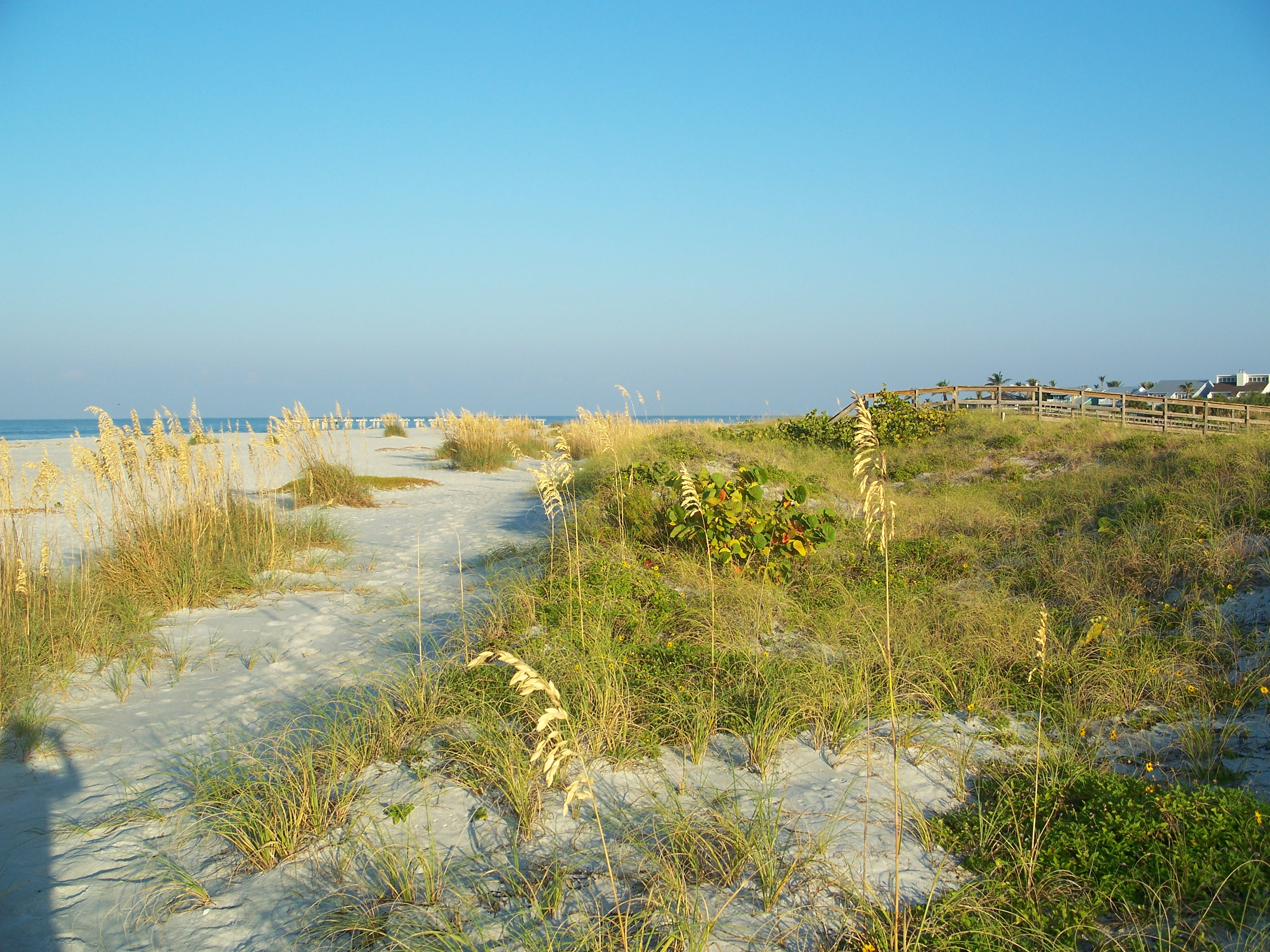
Coastal vegetation

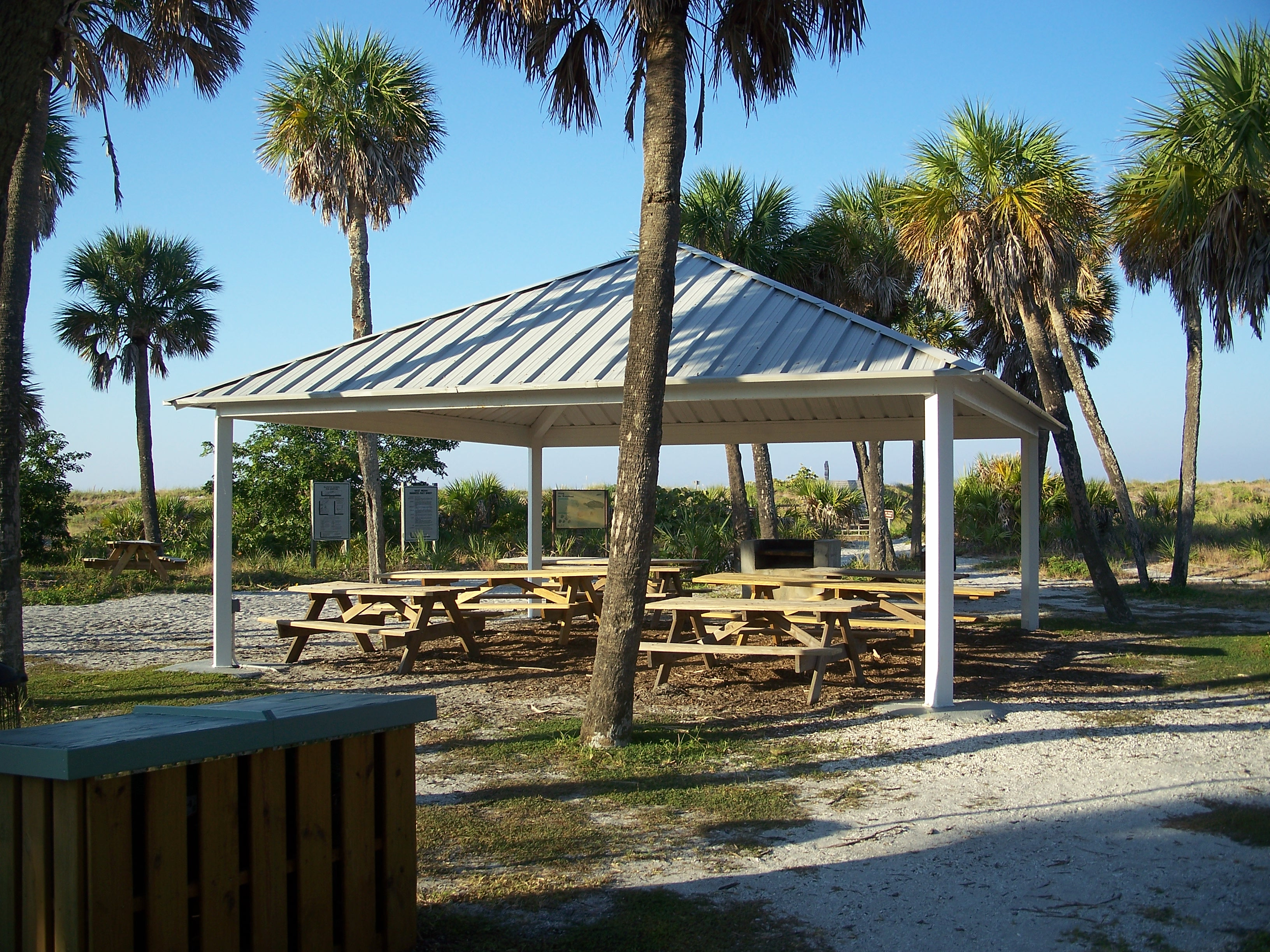
Picnic pavilion

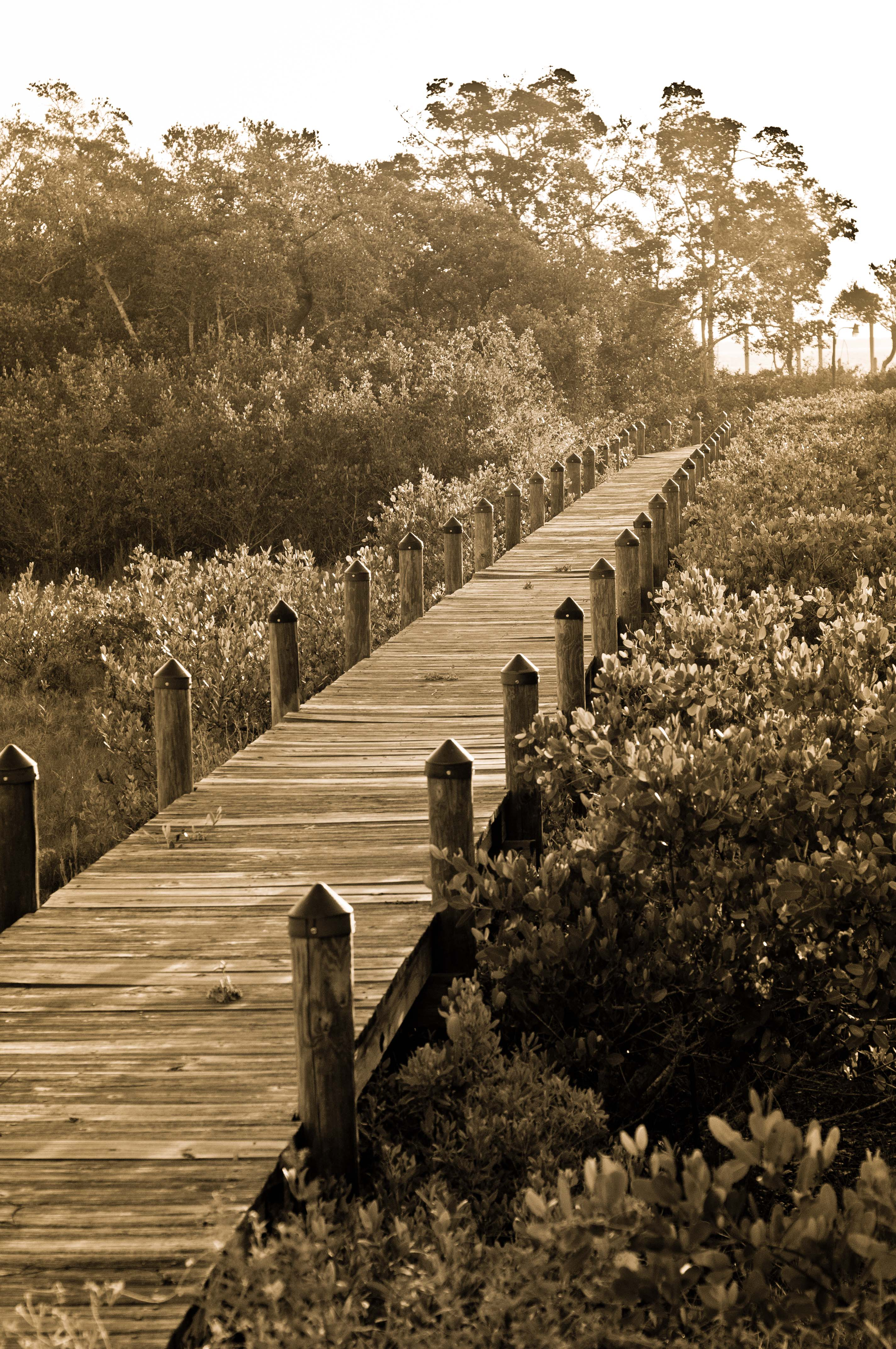
Boardwalk over mangroves

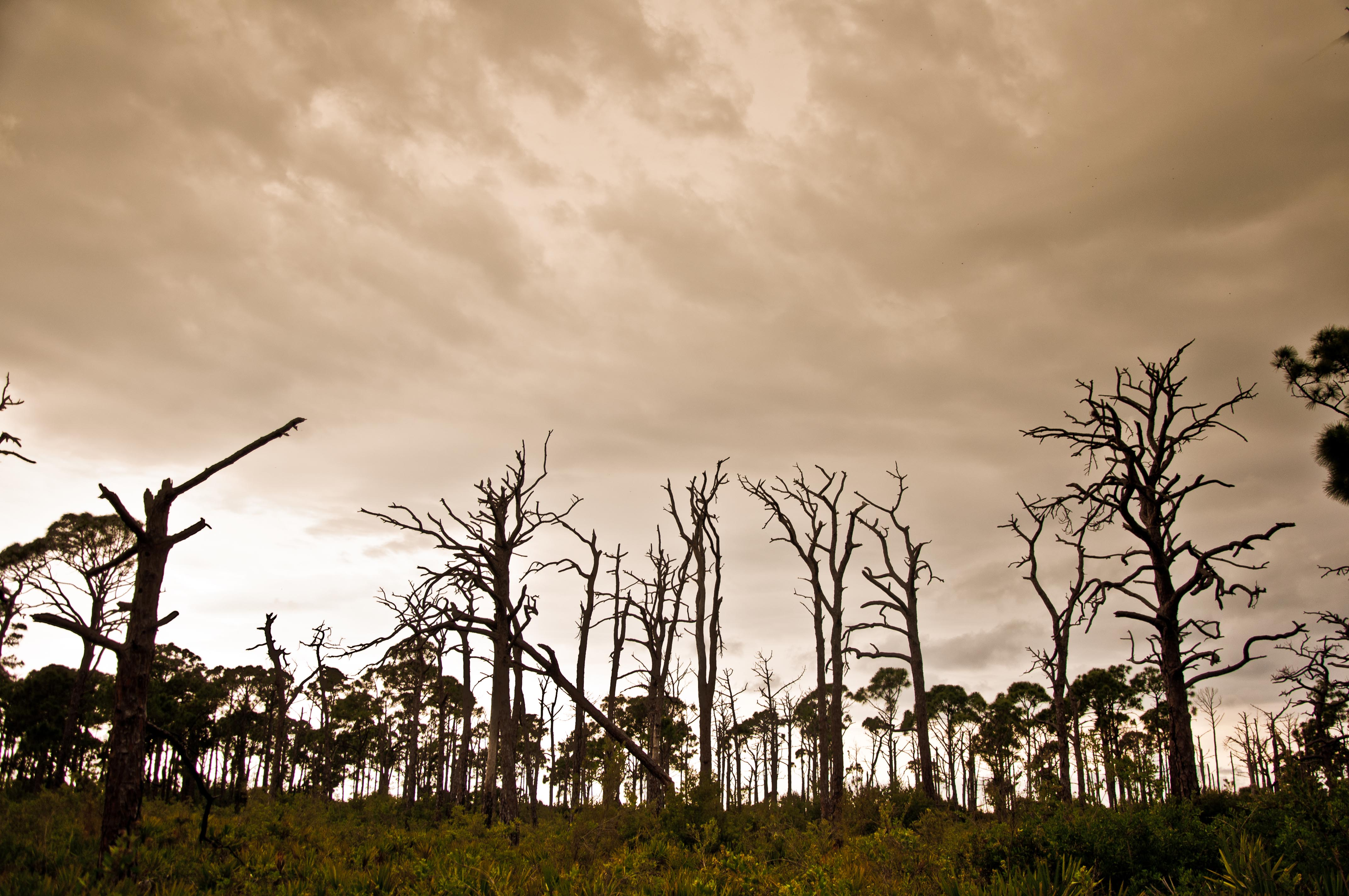
Pinelands

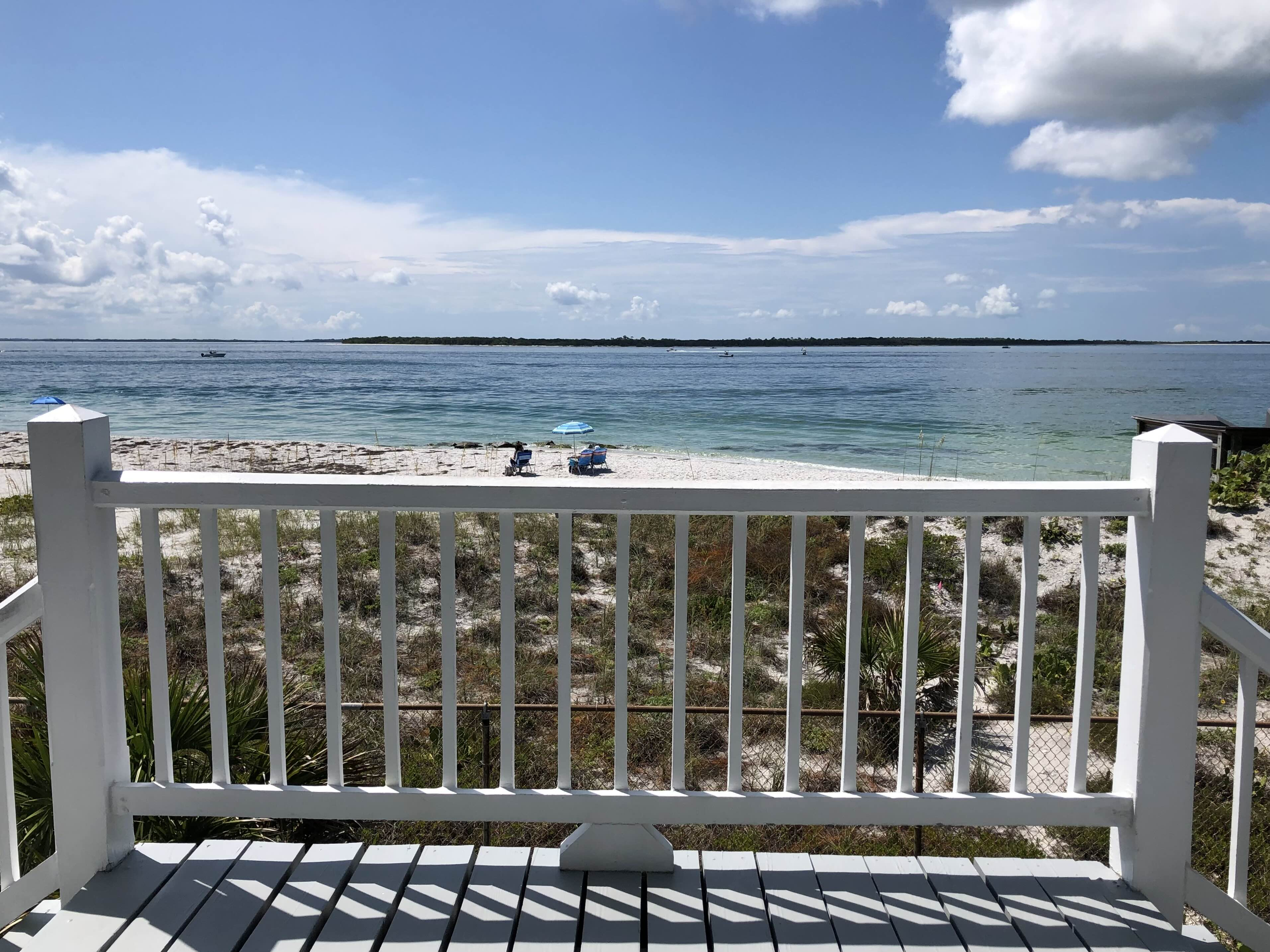
South point

== References and external links ==
Media related to Gasparilla Island State Park at Wikimedia Commons

- Gasparilla Island State Park at Florida State Parks
- Gasparilla Island State Recreation Area at Absolutely Florida
- Gasparilla Island State Recreation Area at Wildernet
