= Henri Caesar =

Fictitious 19th-century Haitian pirate

- Born: fl. 1791; Haiti
- Died: 1830 (aged 38–39)
- Piratical career
- Nickname: Black Caesar
- Type: Pirate
- Years active: 1805-1831
- Rank: Captain
- Base of operations: Port-de-Paix

Henri Caesar, also known as Black Caesar, (fl. 1791–1830) was a legendary 19th-century Haitian revolutionary and pirate. Efforts to find historical evidence of his existence have been unsuccessful. According to works of fiction, he was a participant in the Haitian Revolution under Dutty Boukman and Toussaint Louverture as well as active in piracy for nearly a 30-year period during the early 19th century.

Henri Caesar has been confused with a real West African pirate who was also known as Black Caesar and operated from the Florida Keys in the early 1700s until being captured and hanged in Williamsburg, Virginia in 1718.

== Biography ==
Henri Caesar was supposedly born to a slave family kept by a French plantation owner known as Arnaut. He worked as a houseboy on the estate and, as a young man, worked in the lumberyard. He was mistreated by the supervisor and later killed the man during the slave insurrection, torturing him with a saw. Joining the rebel forces led by Dutty Boukman and Toussaint Louverture, he remained with the revolution until its independence from France in 1804, when he left to try his luck at sea. Based in Port-de-Paix, he captured a Spanish ship in 1805 and soon began attacking small villages and lone vessels near Cuba and the Bahamas from his base in southern Spanish Florida. Adopting the name Black Caesar, he was very successful during his piratical career before his disappearance in 1830.

His fate is uncertain. He may have fled the area after President Andrew Jackson ordered an expedition against pirates active on the Florida coast after its purchase by the United States in 1821. One version of his story says that he was captured, taken to Key West, and burned to death while tied to a tree. The widow of a preacher whose eyes had been burned out under torture from Black Caesar was allowed light the fire.

Caesar is supposed to have buried between $2 and $6 million at one of more locations in southwest Florida including Pine Island, White Horse Key, Marco Island, Elliot Key and Sanibel Island, although none has ever been recovered. He is sometimes associated with Jose Gaspar, another mythical pirate who supposedly operated in the same area at about the same time.
