= Little Gasparilla Island =

Island in Charlotte County, Florida, United States

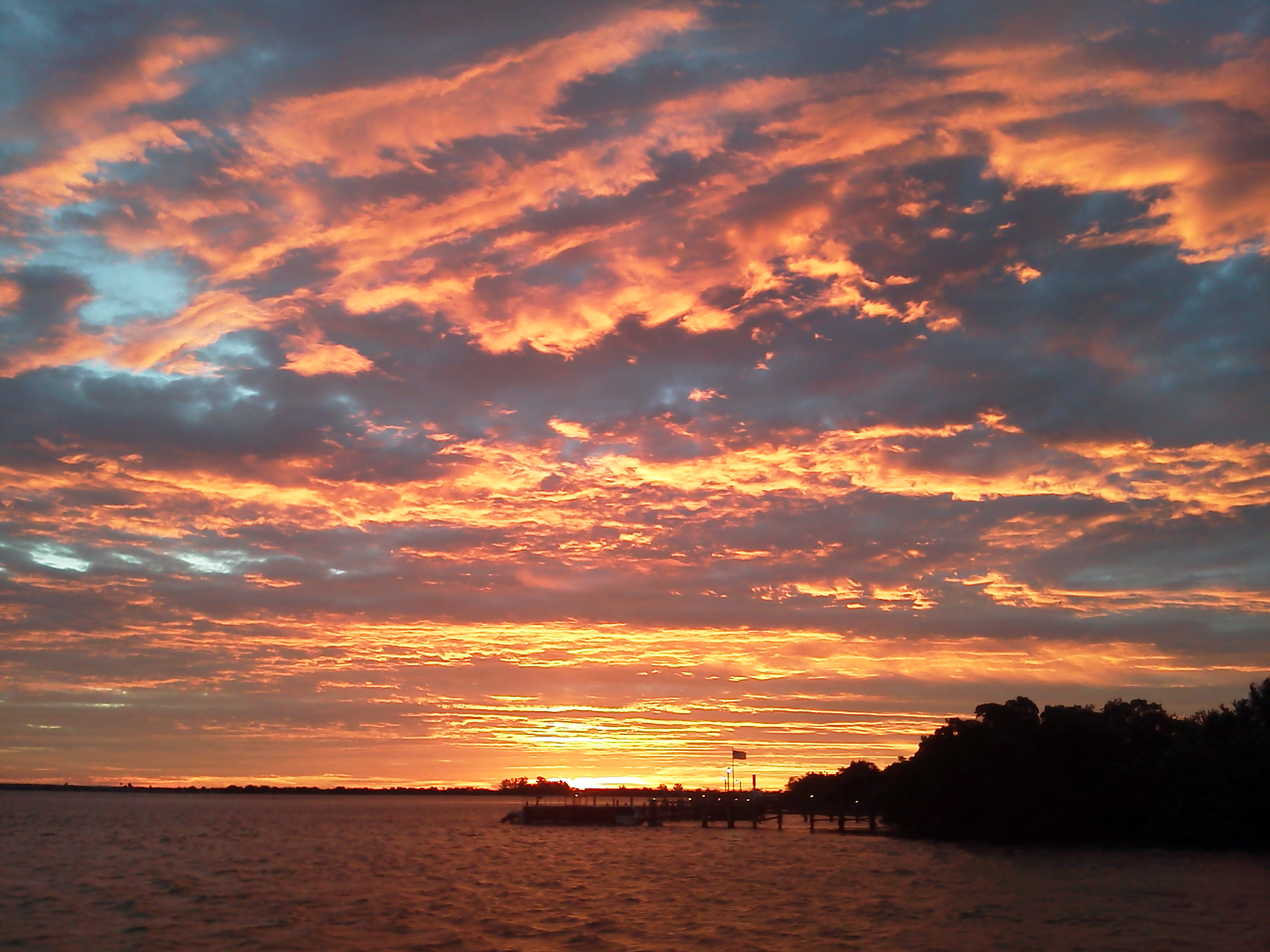
- Sunrise over the bay at Little Gasparilla Island

- Little Gasparilla Island Little Gasparilla Island (the Caribbean)
- Interactive map of Little Gasparilla Island

Geography
- Location: Charlotte County, Florida
- Coordinates: 26°49′47″N 82°17′27″W
- Adjacent to: Gulf of Mexico
- Highest elevation: 3 ft (0.9 m)

Administration
- United States
- State: Florida
- County: Charlotte

Little Gasparilla Island is a barrier island in Charlotte County, Florida, United States. It is just north of Gasparilla Island, separated by Gasparilla Pass, and it lies west of the town of Placida, separated by Placida Harbor. It is connected with Don Pedro Island to the north by a thin strip of beach and mangrove swamp. It borders the Gulf of Mexico to the west, and the island can be reached by water taxi from Placida.
