= Career of Lionel Messi =

Argentine footballing career

Lionel Messi is an Argentine professional footballer who plays as a forward for and captains the Major League Soccer club Inter Miami. His individual achievements include eight Ballon d'Or awards, the most for any footballer. With 47 team trophies, (Note: According to FC Barcelona, FIFA, Major League Soccer, the Royal Spanish Football Federation, and multiple media outlets, Messi also won the 2005 Supercopa de España, bringing his Barcelona trophy total to 35. However, this trophy is not credited here since Messi was out of the squad and did not appear in either of the two games against Real Betis. Similarly, Messi and Inter Miami were awarded a trophy for winning the Eastern Conference title during the 2025 MLS Cup playoffs. However, this trophy is not officially recognized by FIFA, so it is not credited here as well. For the aforementioned reasons, sources disagree on Messi's total number of official career trophies, ranging from 47 to 49.) he is the most decorated player in the history of professional football.

Messi's club career began with Barcelona, where he rose through the youth ranks, making his first-team debut in 2004. During his tenure, Barcelona secured ten La Liga titles, seven Copa del Reys, four UEFA Champions Leagues, seven Supercopa de Españas, three UEFA Super Cups, and three FIFA Club World Cups, and Messi became the club's all-time top scorer. In 2021, due to club financial constraints and league regulations, Messi left Barcelona and signed with Paris Saint-Germain (PSG). Joining forces with fellow superstars Neymar and Kylian Mbappé, he won two Ligue 1 titles and one Trophée des Champions. In 2023, Messi joined Inter Miami and led them to their first-ever MLS Cup championship.

Messi made his debut with the Argentina national team in 2005, and represented the country in six FIFA World Cups and seven Copa Américas. Initially facing criticism for not winning major tournaments with the national team, Messi broke Argentina's 28-year international trophy drought by captaining the team to victory in the 2021 Copa América, the 2022 Finalissima, the 2022 FIFA World Cup, and the 2024 Copa América. Messi retired from international football in October 2026.

== Club career ==
=== Barcelona ===
==== 2004–2005: Rise to the first team ====
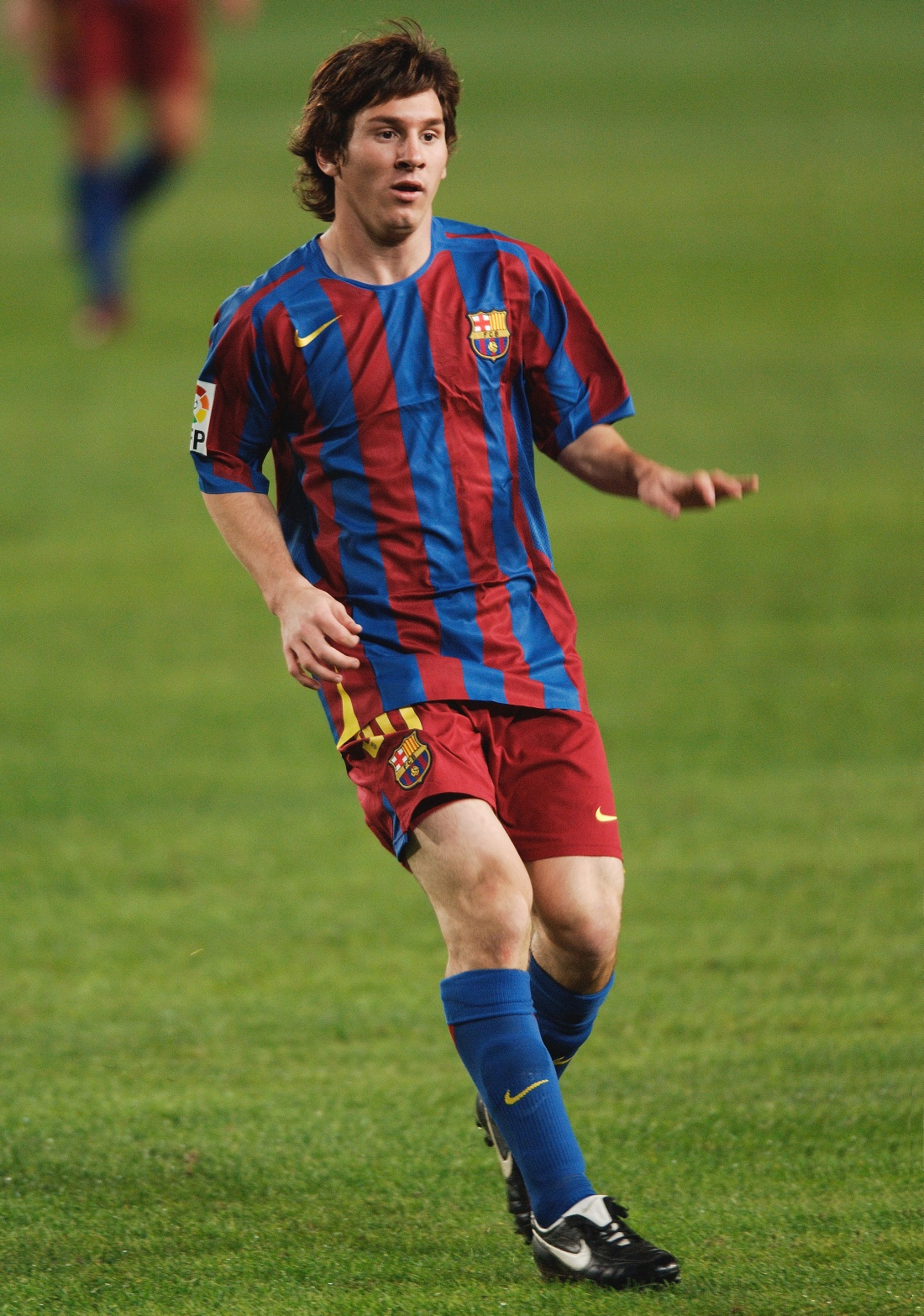
Messi playing against Málaga in 2005

During the 2004–05 season, Lionel Messi was a guaranteed starter for the Barcelona B team, playing 17 games throughout the campaign and scoring six goals. Since his debut in the friendly against Porto the previous November, he had not been called up to the first team again, but in October 2004, the senior players asked manager Frank Rijkaard to promote him. Messi's usual position was left wing, but Ronaldinho already played this position. Rijkaard put Messi on the right flank, allowing him to cut into the centre of the pitch and shoot with his dominant left foot.

Messi made his La Liga debut with Barcelona's senior team during the next match on 16 October, against Espanyol at Estadi Olímpic Lluís Companys in Montjuïc. The 17-year-old Messi was at the time the youngest player to represent Barcelona in an official competition. As a substitute player, he played in nine matches for the first team that season, including his debut in the UEFA Champions League. He scored his first senior goal on 1 May 2005, becoming the youngest-ever scorer for the club at the time. Barcelona won the league for the first time in six years.

==== 2005–2006: Becoming a starting eleven player ====
"In my entire life I have never seen a player of such quality and personality at such a young age."

— Fabio Capello, praising Messi following the Joan Gamper trophy in August 2005

On 24 June 2005, his 18th birthday, Messi signed his first contract as a senior team player. It made him a Barcelona player until 2010, and contained a buyout clause of €150 million. Two months later, Messi made his first start for the club against Fabio Capello's Juventus in the Joan Gamper Trophy, Barcelona's pre-season competition. Capello sought to take Messi to Juventus on loan, but Inter Milan offered to pay his €150 million buyout clause and triple his salary. According to then-president Joan Laporta, it was the only time the club faced a real risk of losing Messi, but he ultimately decided to stay. On 16 September, his contract was updated for the second time in three months and extended to 2014.

Due to issues regarding his legal status in the Royal Spanish Football Federation, Messi missed the start of La Liga, but on 26 September he acquired Spanish citizenship and became eligible to play. Wearing the number 19, he gradually established himself as the first-choice right winger, forming an attacking trio with Ronaldinho and striker Samuel Eto'o. Barcelona began the 2005–06 season by winning the Supercopa de España against Real Betis without Messi, who was not selected to participate in the competition. He was in the starting line-up in major matches like his first Clásico against rivals Real Madrid, a 3–0 victory on 19 November, as well as Barcelona's 2–1 victory over Chelsea in the last-16 round of the Champions League.

After scoring 8 goals in 25 games, including his first in the Champions League, Messi's season ended prematurely on 7 March 2006, when he suffered a torn hamstring. Messi worked to regain fitness in time for the 2006 Champions League final, but he was eventually ruled out. He was so disappointed that he did not celebrate his team's 2–1 victory over Arsenal in Paris, which he later came to regret.

==== 2006–2008: Improving form amid club decline ====
While Barcelona began a gradual decline, the 19-year-old Messi established himself as one of the best players in the world during the 2006–07 season. Already an idol to the club's supporters, he scored 17 goals in 36 games across all competitions. In the league, his goal contribution increased towards the end of the season; 11 of his 14 goals came from the last 13 games. On 10 March 2007, he scored his first hat-trick in a Clásico, the first player to do so in 12 years. His growing importance to the club was reflected in a new contract, signed that month, which greatly increased his salary.

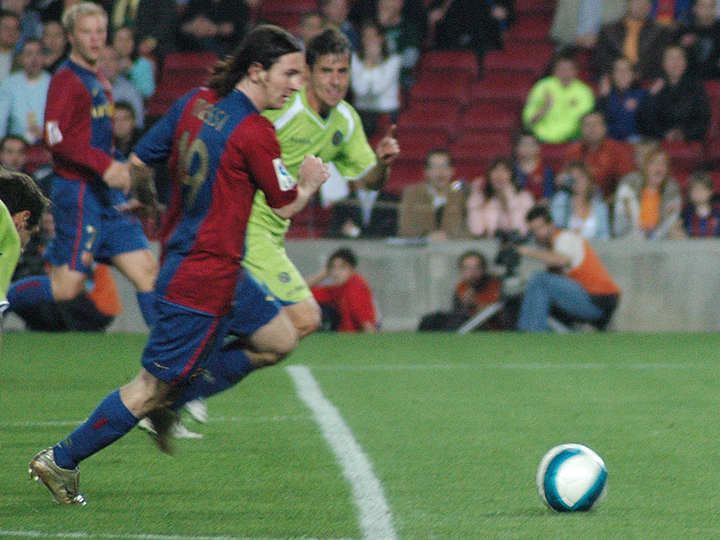
Messi making his Maradona-esque run against Getafe in 2007

Messi, who was already frequently compared to his compatriot Diego Maradona, nearly replicated Maradona's two most famous goals in the span of seven weeks. On 18 April, in a Copa del Rey match against Getafe, he ran 60 metres (66 yd) with the ball, beating five defenders before scoring in a similar fashion to Maradona in his Goal of the Century. A league match against Espanyol on 9 June saw Messi strike the ball with his hand in a fashion comparable to Maradona in his Hand of God goal. In 2019, Messi's goal against Getafe was voted Barcelona's best goal ever in a poll of the club's fans. As Messi continued his individual rise, Barcelona faltered; the team failed to reach the Copa del Rey final and was eliminated from La Liga competition by Real Madrid.

After Ronaldinho lost form, Messi became Barcelona's new star player at 20 years old, receiving the nickname "Messiah" from the Spanish media. (Note: Attributed to multiple references:) Sports journalists voted him the third-best player of the year for the 2007 Ballon d'Or, while international managers and national team captains voted him second for the FIFA World Player of the Year award. After suffering a torn hamstring on 15 December, Messi returned to score twice in a 3–2 victory against Celtic in the last-16 round of the Champions League, becoming the competition's top scorer at that point with six goals. Rijkaard had fielded him despite warnings from the medical staff, and on 4 March 2008 Messi was reinjured, leading captain Carles Puyol to criticise the Spanish media for pressuring Messi to play every match. Barcelona was eliminated from the Champions League semi-finals by Manchester United and finished third in the league.

==== 2008–2009: First treble ====
After two unsuccessful seasons, Barcelona were in need of an overhaul, leading to the departure of Rijkaard and Ronaldinho. Upon Ronaldinho's departure, Messi was given the number 10 shirt. He signed a new contract in July with an annual salary of €7.8 million, becoming the club's highest-paid player. Ahead of the new season, a major concern remained his frequent muscular injuries, which had left him sidelined for a total of eight months between 2006 and 2008. To combat the problem, the club implemented new training, nutrition, and lifestyle regimens, and assigned him a personal physiotherapist. As a result, Messi remained virtually injury-free during the next four years. His performances in 2008 saw him again voted runner-up for the Ballon d'Or and the FIFA World Player of the Year award, both times behind Cristiano Ronaldo.

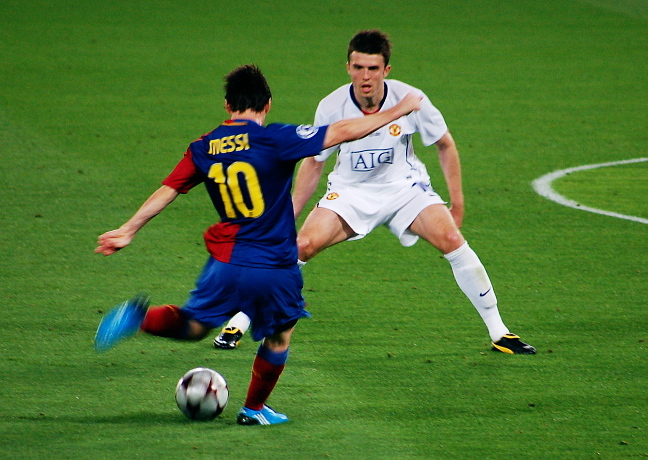
Messi aiming to shoot during the 2009 UEFA Champions League final against Manchester United

During the 2008–09 season, he scored 38 goals in 51 games, contributing alongside Eto'o and Thierry Henry to a total of 100 goals in all competitions, a record at the time for the club. During his first season under Barcelona's new manager Pep Guardiola, Messi played mainly as a false winger. On 2 May 2009, however, he played for the first time as a false nine, scoring twice in a 6–2 victory over Real Madrid. Returning to the wing, he scored once and assisted a second goal as Barcelona defeated Athletic Bilbao 4–1 in the 2009 Copa del Rey final. With 23 league goals from Messi that season, Barcelona became La Liga champions three days later and achieved its fifth double.

Messi became the season's Champions League top scorer with nine goals, the youngest in the tournament's history. He returned as a false nine during the 2009 Champions League final on 27 May in Rome against defending champions Manchester United, scoring the second goal in a 2–0 victory. Barcelona achieved the first treble in the history of Spanish football, an accomplishment that was reflected in a new contract which committed Messi to the club through 2016. The contract had a buyout clause of €250 million, and increased his salary to €12 million.

==== 2009–2010: First Ballon d'Or ====
The team's prosperity continued into the second half of 2009, as Barcelona became the first club in history to achieve the sextuple, winning six top-tier trophies in a single year. After victories in the Supercopa de España and UEFA Super Cup in August, Barcelona won their first ever FIFA Club World Cup against Estudiantes de La Plata on 19 December, with Messi scoring the winning 2–1 goal in the final in extra time. At 22 years old, Messi won the Ballon d'Or and the FIFA World Player of the Year award, each by the largest voting margin in history.

"Messi is the best player in the world by some distance ... He can take advantage of every mistake we make."

— Arsène Wenger commends Messi for his four-goal display against Arsenal in April 2010.

The new year started on a less positive note for Barcelona, as they were knocked out of the Copa del Rey in the round of 16. Unsatisfied with his position on the right wing, Messi resumed playing as a false nine in early 2010. At that point, he effectively became the tactical focal point of Guardiola's team, and his goalscoring rate increased. Messi finished the season as the top scorer in the Champions League for the second consecutive year. He scored a total of 47 goals in all competitions that season, equalling Ronaldo's club record from the 1996–97 campaign. As La Liga's top scorer with 34 goals (again tying Ronaldo's record), he helped Barcelona win a second consecutive La Liga trophy and earned his first European Golden Shoe.

==== 2010–2011: Fifth La Liga title, third Champions League, and second Ballon d'Or ====
Messi secured Barcelona's first trophy of the 2010–11 season, the Supercopa de España, by scoring a hat-trick in a 4–0 victory over Sevilla. Assuming a playmaking role, he was instrumental in a 5–0 victory against Real Madrid on 29 November 2010. He helped his team achieve 16 consecutive league victories, a record in Spanish football, concluding with another hat-trick against Atlético Madrid in a 3–0 win on 5 February 2011. Messi's club performances in 2010 earned him the inaugural FIFA Ballon d'Or, an amalgamation of the Ballon d'Or and the FIFA World Player of the Year award, though his win was met with some criticism due to his lack of success with Argentina at the 2010 FIFA World Cup.

During a semi-finals match of the Champions League, one of Messi's goals was described as one of the best ever in the competition. In the Champions League final on 28 May, he gave a man-of-the-match performance by scoring the winning goal in Barcelona's 3–1 victory. He was the competition's top scorer for the third consecutive year, with 12 goals. During the La Liga season, Messi had 31 goals and 18 assists as Barcelona won a third consecutive La Liga title. He finished the overall season with 53 goals in all competitions, becoming Barcelona's all-time single-season top scorer and the first player in Spanish football history to reach 50 goals in a season.

==== 2011–2012: Record-breaking season, third Ballon d'Or, and Barcelona's all-time goalscorer ====
As Messi developed into a combination of a creator, scorer and assistant, he scored an unprecedented 73 goals and provided 30 assists in all club competitions during the 2011–12 season. (Note: Attributed to multiple references:) In the Supercopa de España, Messi scored three times, overtaking Raúl as the competition's all-time top scorer with eight goals. On 18 December, Messi scored twice in the 2011 FIFA Club World Cup final, a 4–0 victory over Santos. He earned the Golden Ball as the best player of the tournament, as he had done two years previously. For his efforts in 2011, he again received the FIFA Ballon d'Or, becoming only the fourth player in history to win the award three times. He also won the inaugural UEFA Best Player in Europe Award. By then, Messi was already widely considered one of the best footballers in history, alongside players like Diego Maradona and Pelé.

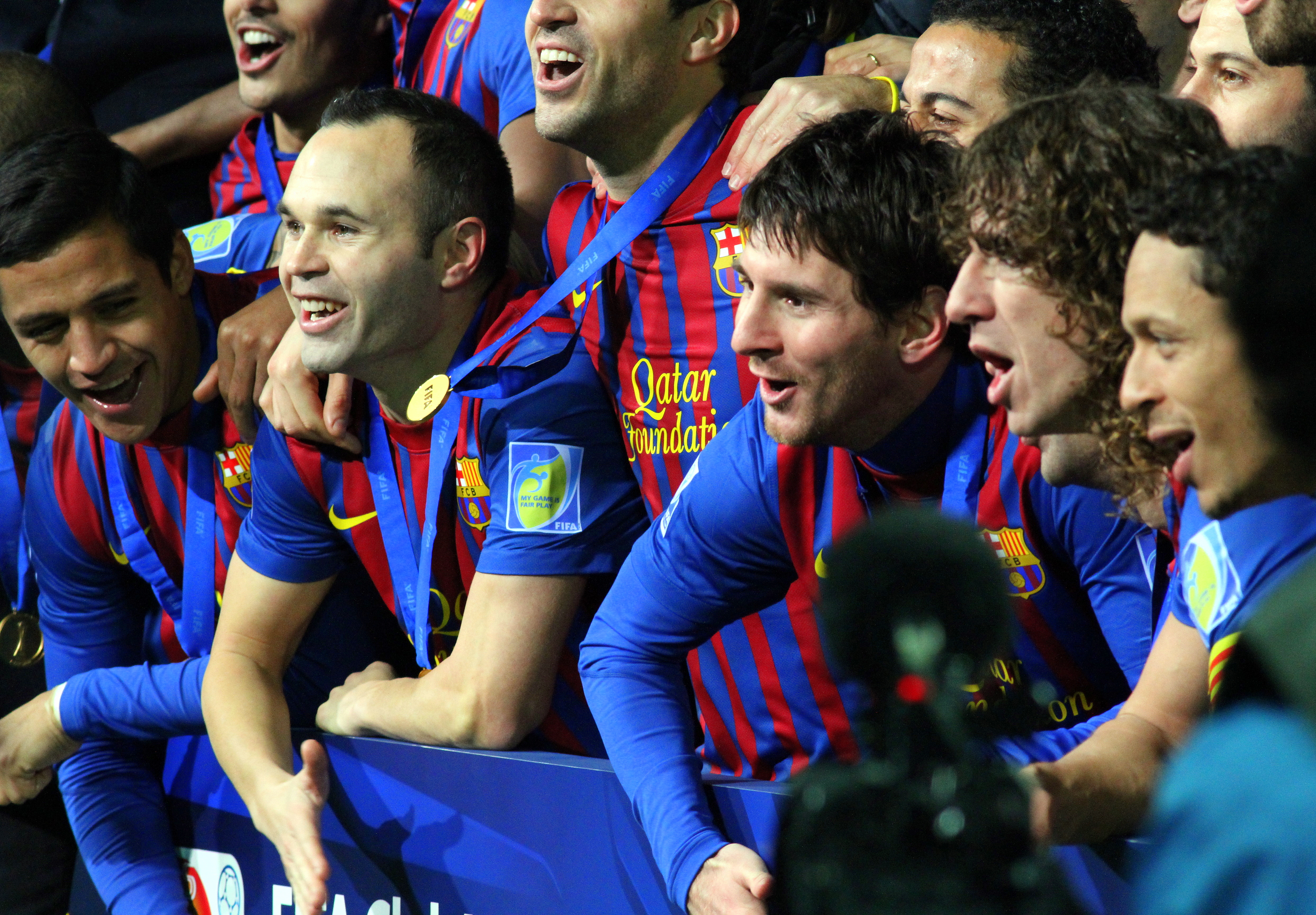
Messi (centre) and his teammates celebrate winning the 2011 FIFA Club World Cup.

As Messi maintained his goalscoring form into the second half of the season, the year 2012 saw him break several longstanding records. In March, Messi became the top goalscorer in Barcelona's history with 234 goals, surpassing César Rodríguez. On 3 April, he became the youngest player in history to score 50 goals in the Champions League. Despite Messi's individual form, Barcelona's four-year cycle of success under Guardiola drew to an end. Although Barcelona won the 2012 Copa del Rey final in May, the team lost to Real Madrid in La Liga and was eliminated in the Champions League semi-finals. Messi finished the season as the league top scorer in Spain and Europe for a second time. He had scored a record 50 goals in La Liga, while his 73 goals in all competitions made him the single-season top scorer in the history of European club football.

==== 2012–2013: Record-breaking calendar year, fourth Ballon d'Or, and Messidependencia ====
Under manager Tito Vilanova, Messi helped Barcelona achieve its best-ever start to a La Liga season during the second half of 2012, amassing 55 points by the competition's midway point, a record in Spanish football. In early December, he became Barcelona's all-time top scorer in La Liga, and he broke Gerd Müller's record of most goals scored in a calendar year. At the close of the year, Messi had scored a record 91 goals in all competitions for Barcelona and Argentina. Although FIFA did not acknowledge the achievement, Messi received the Guinness World Records title for most goals scored in a calendar year. Messi again won the FIFA Ballon d'Or, becoming the first player to win the award four times. Now in his ninth senior season with Barcelona, Messi signed a new contract which committed him to the club through 2018, while his salary rose to €13 million. He wore the captain's armband for the first time on 17 March.

After four largely injury-free seasons, the muscular injuries that had previously plagued Messi reoccurred. He suffered a hamstring strain on 2 April, during a match against Paris Saint-Germain (PSG). In a subsequent match against PSG, Messi came off the bench in the second half and, within nine minutes, helped create Barcelona's game-tying goal. Defender Gerard Piqué explained that even if Messi is "half lame", his mere presence on the pitch motivates his teammates and improves their playing. The term Messidependencia emerged to refer to Barcelona's perceived tactical and psychological dependence on Messi.

Messi continued to struggle with injury throughout 2013. Further damage to his hamstring in May ended his goalscoring streak of 21 consecutive league games, a worldwide record. With 60 goals in all competitions, including 46 goals in La Liga, he finished the season as the league top scorer in Spain and Europe for the second consecutive year, becoming the first player in history to win the European Golden Shoe three times.

==== 2013–2014: Continued injuries and club decline ====
After scoring a hat-trick in Barcelona's opening match of the Champions League, Messi suffered his fifth injury of 2013 when he tore his hamstring on 10 November, which left him sidelined for two months. (Note: Attributed to multiple references:) During the second half of the 2013–14 season, doubts persisted over Messi's form, leading to a perception among Barcelona's fans that he was saving himself for the 2014 FIFA World Cup; his number of goals, shots, and passes had dropped significantly compared to previous seasons. He still managed to break two longstanding records in a span of seven days: a hat-trick on 16 March saw him become Barcelona's top goalscorer in all competitions including friendlies, while another hat-trick on 23 March made him the all-time top scorer in El Clásico.

Messi finished the campaign with his worst output in five seasons, though he still managed to score 41 goals in all competitions. For the first time in five years, Barcelona ended the season without a major trophy. After prolonged speculation over his future with the club, Messi signed a new contract on 19 May 2014, only a year after his last contractual update; his salary increased to €20 million, or €36 million before taxes, the highest in the sport. (Note: Attributed to multiple references:)

==== 2014–2015: Birth of MSN and second treble ====
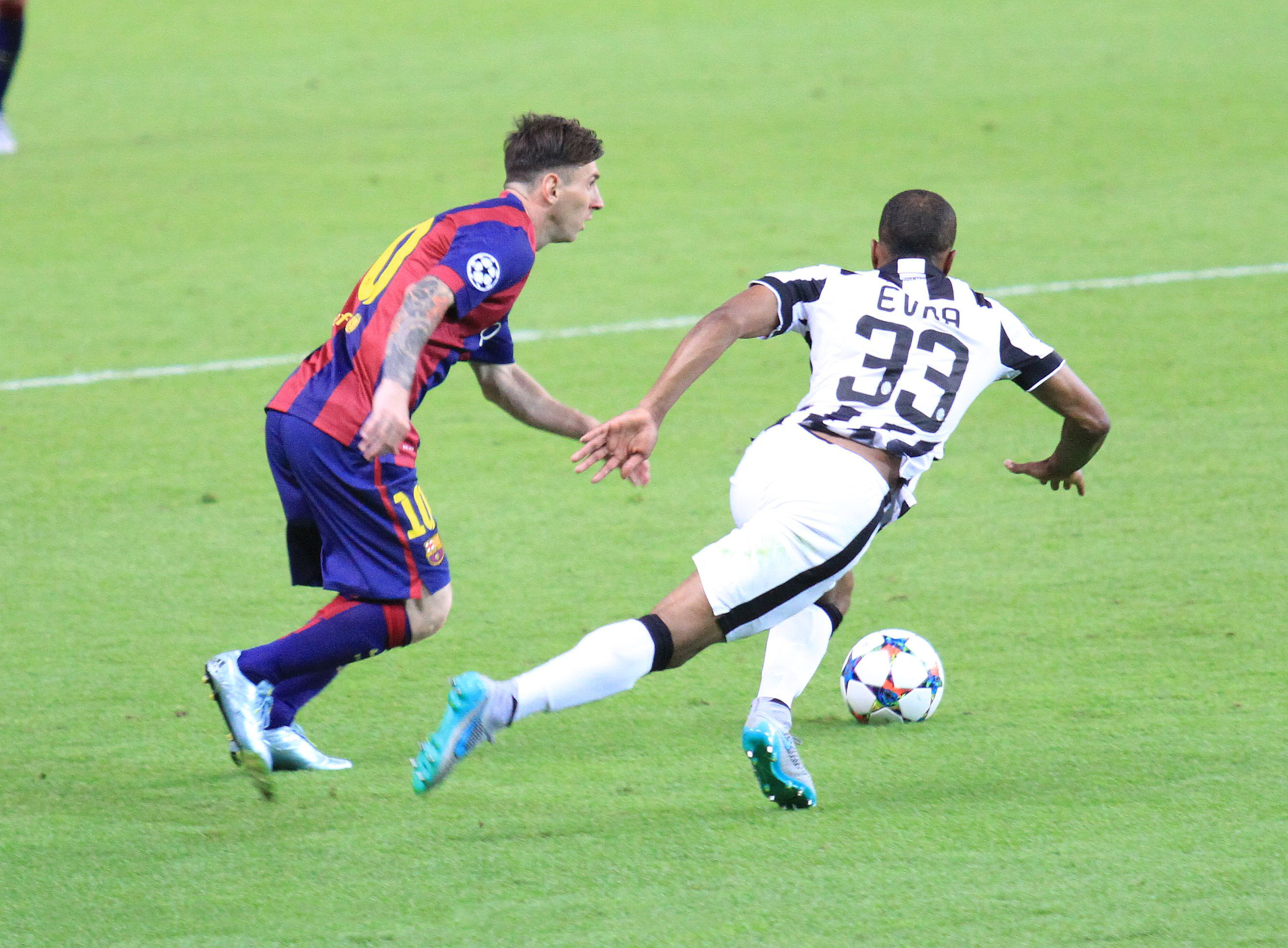
Messi dribbling past Juventus defender Patrice Evra during the 2015 UEFA Champions League Final

Under Barcelona's new manager and former captain Luis Enrique, Messi experienced a largely injury-free start to the 2014–15 season. A hat-trick on 22 November made him the all-time top scorer in La Liga with 253 goals. (Note: Attributed to multiple references:) After years of playing in the centre of the pitch, Messi was now playing on the right wing as part of Barcelona's attacking trio, which also included Luis Suárez and Neymar. (Note: Attributed to multiple references:) The trio, which colloquially became known as MSN, ended the team's dependency on Messi for offensive play (Note: Attributed to multiple references:) and broke goalscoring records. During early 2015, Messi set La Liga records for the most assists (106) and most hat-tricks (32). (Note: Assist statistics began in 1990) (Note: Attributed to multiple references:) He scored twice as Barcelona won the 2015 Copa del Rey final in May, with his opening goal being hailed as one of the greatest in his career. Messi recorded 58 goals during the season, while the MSN trio scored a total of 122 goals in all competitions, a record in Spanish football.

On 6 May, one of Messi's goals in a Champions League match became the year's most tweeted about sporting moment and was named the best goal of the season by UEFA. (Note: Attributed to multiple references:) Barcelona defeated Juventus in the Champions League final, becoming the first team in history to win two trebles. (Note: Attributed to multiple references:) Messi finished the competition as the joint top scorer with ten goals, which made him the first player to achieve the top scoring mark in five Champions League seasons. For the second time, Messi received the UEFA Best Player in Europe award.

==== 2015–2016: Domestic success and fifth Ballon d'Or ====
Early in the 2015–16 season, Messi became the youngest player to make 100 appearances in the UEFA Champions League. He scored the opening goal of the 2015 FIFA Club World Cup final in December, collecting his fifth club trophy of 2015 as Barcelona defeated River Plate 3–0. In January, Messi won the FIFA Ballon d'Or for a record fifth time. In February. Messi reached his 300th league goal, and in April he scored his 500th senior career goal for Barcelona. Messi finished the season by assisting both goals in Barcelona's 2–0 win over Sevilla in the 2016 Copa del Rey final, as the club celebrated winning the domestic double for the second consecutive season. Messi scored 41 goals during the season, while the MSN trio scored a total of 131 goals, breaking the record they had set the previous season.

==== 2016–2017: Fourth Golden Shoe ====
Messi opened the 2016–17 season by lifting the Supercopa de España as Barcelona's captain in the absence of the injured Andrés Iniesta. (Note: Attributed to multiple references:) He sustained a groin injury that sidelined him for three weeks, returning on 16 October. Three days later, he scored his record-extending seventh hat-trick in the Champions League in a 4–0 win over Manchester City. Messi finished the year with 51 goals, making him Europe's top scorer. He placed second in both the 2016 Ballon d'Or and the 2016 Best FIFA Men's Player Award, both times behind Cristiano Ronaldo. In February, Messi's teammate Javier Mascherano said in an interview that Messi's talent is so great that he breaks the rule that no individual player is more important than their club. On 23 April, Messi scored a game-winning goal in stoppage time against Real Madrid, which was his 500th goal for Barcelona. The following month, Messi helped Barcelona to a 3–1 victory over Alavés in the 2017 Copa del Rey final, and was named Man of the Match. Messi finished the season with 54 goals; his 37 goals in La Liga saw him finish as the top scorer and claim both the Pichichi and European Golden Shoe Awards for the fourth time in his career. Neymar's departure for Paris Saint-Germain the next season meant that the attacking trio had scored a combined total of 363 goals over the course of three seasons.

==== 2017–2018: Domestic double and a record fifth Golden Shoe ====
On 18 October, Messi scored his 100th goal in UEFA club competitions, becoming the second player after Cristiano Ronaldo to reach the milestone. Following the reception of his fourth Golden Shoe, Messi signed a new contract with Barcelona on 25 November, keeping him with the club through the 2020–21 season. His buyout clause was set at €700 million. On 7 January 2018, Messi made his 400th La Liga appearance with Barcelona. A week later, he scored his 366th league goal for the club, surpassing Gerd Müller's record for the most league goals scored for the same club in one of Europe's top five divisions. In February, Messi became the first player to score against 36 different teams in La Liga.

On 14 March, Messi scored his 100th Champions League goal in the round of 16 against Chelsea in a 3–0 win, becoming the second player after Cristiano Ronaldo to reach the landmark. In late April, Messi scored his 40th goal of the season during a 5–0 win over Sevilla in the 2018 Copa del Rey final; this was Barcelona's fourth Copa del Rey consecutive title and their 30th overall. Eight days later, Messi scored a hat-trick in a 4–2 win over Deportivo de La Coruña, helping Barcelona clinch their 25th La Liga title. Messi once again finished the season as the top scorer in La Liga, with 34 goals, and earned his fifth European Golden Shoe award.

==== 2018–2019: Captaincy, 10th La Liga title, and a record sixth Golden Shoe ====
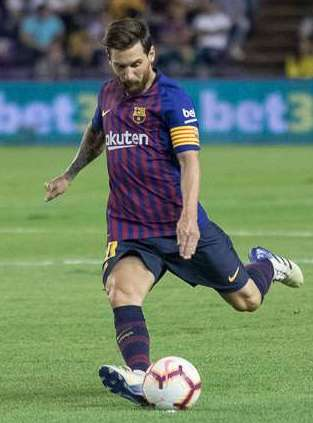
Messi taking a free kick against Real Valladolid in 2018

With the departure of former captain Andrés Iniesta in May 2018, Messi was named the team's new captain for the following season. On 12 August, he claimed his first title as Barcelona's captain, the Supercopa de España, following a 2–1 victory over Sevilla. The trophy was Messi's 33rd for the club, surpassing Iniesta and making Messi the most decorated player in the history of Barcelona. In February 2019, the club stated they had begun preparations for Messi's future retirement.

In late February, Messi scored the 50th hat-trick of his career during a 4–2 La Liga victory over Sevilla. On 6 April, he scored the second goal in a 2–0 victory against Atlético Madrid; the win was Messi's 335th in La Liga, surpassing the previous record of 334 wins held by Iker Casillas. Later in the month, Barcelona clinched its first league title with Messi as captain. On 19 May, Messi scored twice in a 2–2 draw against Eibar, which saw him capture his sixth Pichichi Trophy as the league's top scorer, with 36 goals in 34 appearances. He became the first player to win the European Golden Shoe three years in a row, and also the first to win it six times overall.

==== 2019–2020: Record sixth Ballon d'Or and desire to leave Barcelona ====
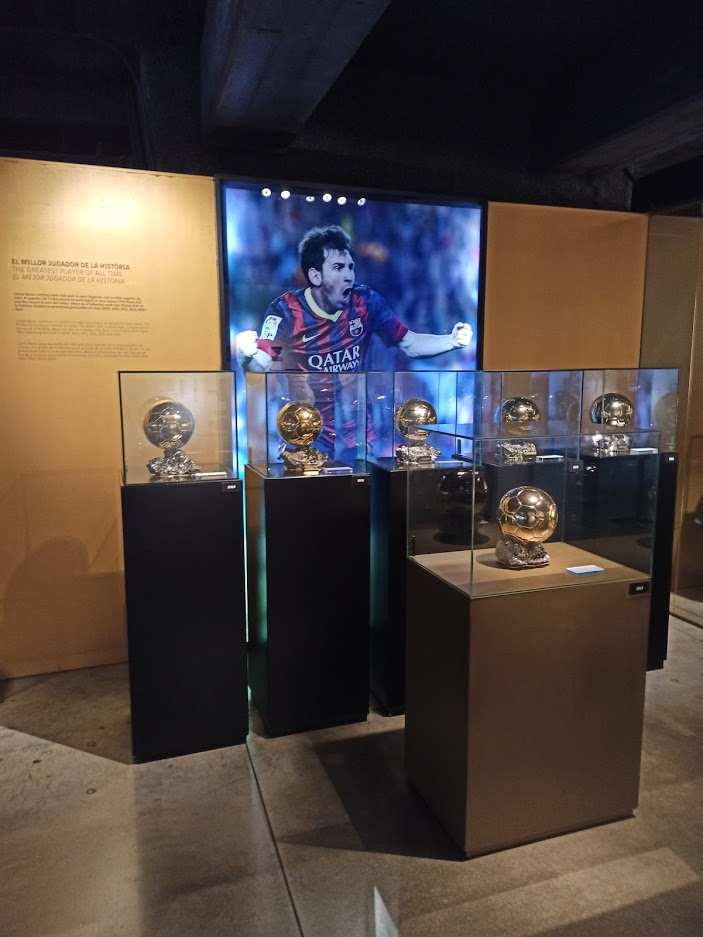
Messi's six Ballon d'Or awards on display in the FC Barcelona Museum

During 2019, Messi was one of three finalists for the 2019 FIFA Puskás Award, and he won the 2019 Best FIFA Men's Player Award. (Note: Attributed to multiple references:) In October, he achieved 608 career club goals, surpassing Cristiano Ronaldo's 606. Near the end of the year, Messi scored his record-breaking 35th hat-trick in La Liga and was awarded a record sixth Ballon d'Or. On 30 June, Messi reached his 700th goal in his senior career for Barcelona and Argentina. He finished the season as both the top scorer and top assist provider in La Liga for the third consecutive year, with 25 goals and 21 assists respectively. He won his record seventh Pichichi Trophy, and set a record for most assists in a La Liga season.

Messi was growing dissatisfied with Barcelona on and off the field, and he expressed his desire to leave on 25 August 2020. The decision sparked reactions on social media from current and former teammates, members of other football clubs, and Catalan President Quim Torra. On 26 August, Barcelona's sporting director Ramon Planes stated Barcelona's desire to build the team around Messi, and said he could leave only if a buyer paid his €700 million buyout clause. A reported early termination option in Messi's contract—which would have allowed him to leave the club without a penalty—could only be exercised if he had communicated his wishes to Barcelona by 31 May 2020, although Messi's representatives argued the deadline should be set to 31 August, due to the adjourned 2019–20 season. On 4 September, Messi announced in an interview with Goal that he would stay with Barcelona for the final year of his contract. (Note: Attributed to multiple references:)

==== 2020–2021: Final season at Barcelona ====
Two days prior to the opening game of the 2020–21 season, Messi criticised Barcelona for the manner of Luis Suárez's departure, stating, "at this stage nothing surprises me any more". After scoring a goal on 29 November, Messi made a tribute to Maradona—who had died four days earlier—by unveiling a shirt from Newell's Old Boys, which was a replica of the one Maradona had worn during his stint with the club in 1993.

On 23 December, Messi scored his 644th goal for Barcelona, surpassing Pelé as the player with the most goals scored for a single club. On 17 January 2021, Messi swung his arm at Asier Villalibre of Athletic Bilbao in the final minutes of Barcelona's defeat in the 2021 Supercopa de España final, which caused Messi to be ejected from the match. In March, he become Barcelona's all-time highest appearance maker with 768 appearances.

On 17 April, Barcelona defeated Athletic Bilbao in the 2021 Copa del Rey final, with Messi scoring twice. His second goal broke Gerd Müller's record of 30 or more goals in 12 consecutive club seasons, setting a new record of 13. On 16 May, Messi scored his 30th league goal of the campaign in a 2–1 home defeat against Celta Vigo, which later turned out to be his final goal and match in a Barcelona shirt. As the top goalscorer in La Liga during the season, Messi received the Pichichi Trophy for a record fifth consecutive time, and for a record eighth time in his career. With 30 goals in the 2020–21 La Liga campaign and a triumph with Argentina at the 2021 Copa América, where he was jointly named Best Player and won the Golden Boot, Messi was awarded the 2021 Ballon d'Or.

==== August 2021: Departure ====
On 1 July, Messi became a free agent after his contract expired, with negotiations on a new deal complicated due to financial issues at Barcelona. On 5 August, Barcelona announced that Messi would not be staying at the club, even though both parties had reached an agreement and were due to sign a contract that day. The club cited financial and structural obstacles posed by La Liga regulations as the reason for Messi's departure. Club president Joan Laporta also blamed Barcelona's debt and the previous board of directors for Messi's exit. Three days later, in a tearful press conference held at the Camp Nou, Messi confirmed that he would be leaving Barcelona. He ended his career with more appearances, goals, assists and trophies than any other player in club history.

=== Paris Saint-Germain ===
==== 2021–2022: First season adjustments and seventh Ballon d'Or ====
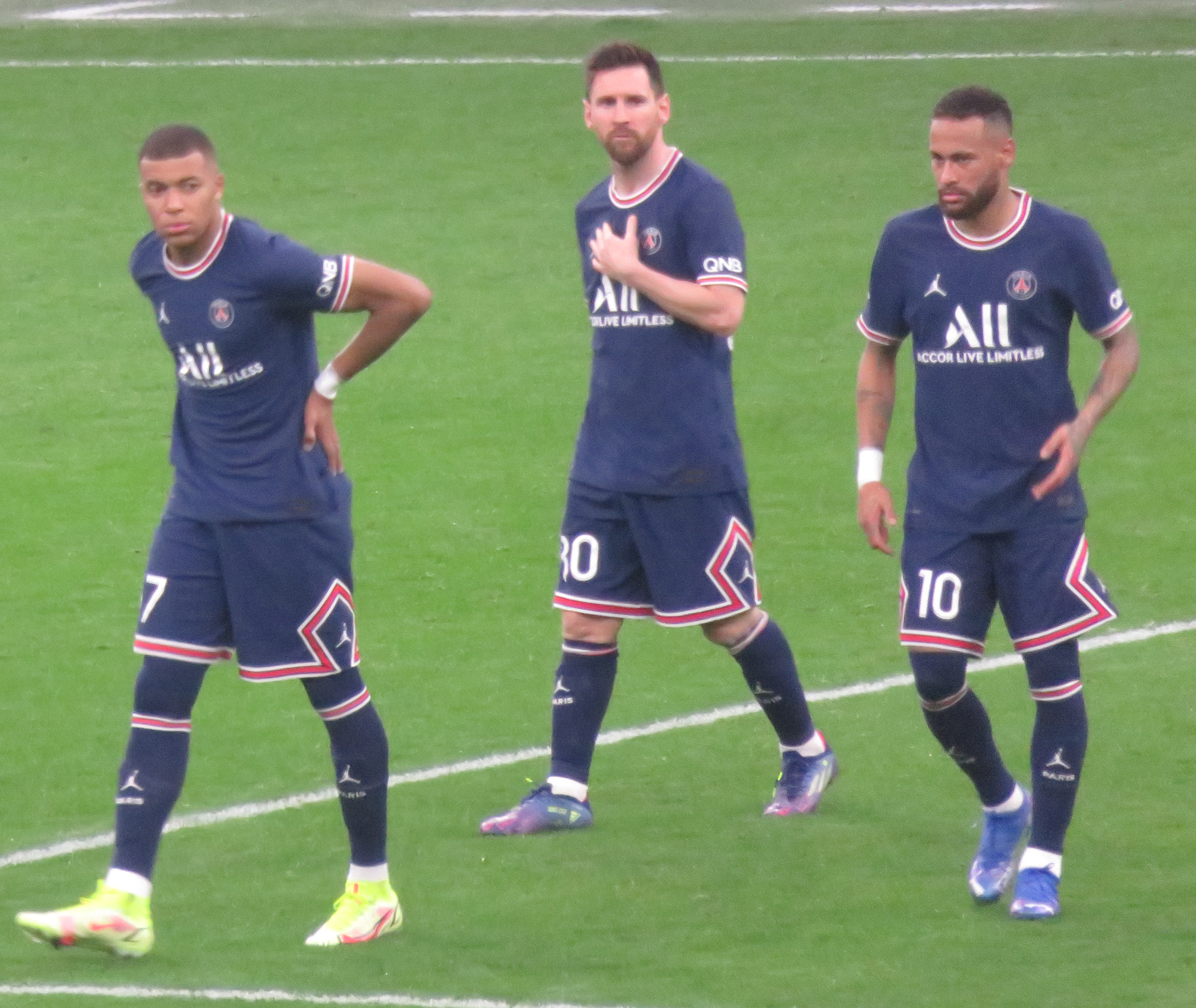
Messi (middle) with PSG teammates Kylian Mbappé (left) and Neymar

On 10 August, Messi joined French club Paris Saint-Germain (PSG) on a free transfer. He signed a two-year contract which kept him with the club until June 2023, with an option for an extra year. He chose 30 as his squad number, the same number he wore as a teenager when he made his senior debut for Barcelona. On 29 August, Messi made his debut for PSG, and on 28 September he scored his first goal for the club. In November, he scored his first goal for PSG in a Ligue 1 match.

On 13 March, PSG was eliminated from the Champions League in the round of 16, during which Messi had missed a penalty kick. He and Neymar were booed by some PSG fans, behaviour which was condemned by PSG manager Mauricio Pochettino. On 23 April, Messi helped PSG clinch their 10th Ligue 1 title by scoring his team's only goal in a 1–1 draw against Lens. However, he struggled throughout the season, scoring a total of 6 goals in the league. This was the first time since 2005–06 that he failed to reach double figure league goals. Across all competitions, Messi finished his debut season with 11 goals and 14 assists.

==== 2022–2023: Return to form and departure ====
Under new coach Christophe Galtier, Messi returned to his preferred role as a playmaker behind two strikers. He started off the season on 31 July by scoring PSG's first goal in a 4–0 victory over Nantes in the Trophée des Champions, thus winning his second trophy with PSG.

For the first time since 2005, Messi was not nominated for the Ballon d'Or, although he was named the Ligue 1 Player of the Month in September 2022. On 5 October, he scored in a 1–1 draw against Benfica, becoming the first player to score against 40 different Champions League opponents. Near the end of the month, Messi scored his twelfth goal of the season, surpassing his total goal count of the previous season in 18 matches.

On 26 February 2023, PSG defeated Marseille 3–0, with Messi scoring his 700th senior career club goal. Less than a week later, he reached 1,000 career direct goal contributions at club level, with 701 goals and 299 assists. On 11 March, PSG defeated Brest 2–1, with Messi registering his 300th club career assist. The following month, he overtook Cristiano Ronaldo as the all-time highest goalscorer in European club football with 702 goals.

On 2 May, Messi was suspended for two weeks and fined after taking an unauthorised trip to Saudi Arabia as part of a promotional agreement. The trip came immediately after PSG unexpectedly lost to Lorient; some PSG supporters criticised Messi for missing team practices after a defeat, and some demanded that he leave the club. Messi apologised for the trip two days later. On 28 May, Messi scored in a 1–1 draw against Strasbourg, helping PSG clinch their record-breaking 11th Ligue 1 title and his second in a row.

On 1 June, Galtier stated that PSG's match against Clermont on 3 June would be Messi's last for the club. Messi ended the season with 16 league assists, the highest in Ligue 1, and was awarded the Ligue 1 Best Foreign Player of the Season and included in the Team of the Season.

=== Inter Miami ===
Following his departure from PSG, Messi decided to sign with the Major League Soccer club Inter Miami. (Note: Attributed to multiple references:) Messi confirmed his intention to join the club in a joint interview with Mundo Deportivo and Sport. He said that other European clubs had approached him, but he refused them because the only European team he wanted to play for was Barcelona, which was unable to re-sign him due to financial constraints. He explained that even though La Liga would have allowed him to return to Barcelona, the club would have to lower salaries and sell players, and he did not want to go through that process or be responsible for it. On 15 July, Inter Miami announced the signing of Messi on a two-and-a-half-year contract. The following day, he was formally introduced to fans at a live-streamed event, dubbed "La PresentaSÍon", at DRV PNK Stadium.

==== 2023: Leagues Cup victory and eighth Ballon d'Or ====
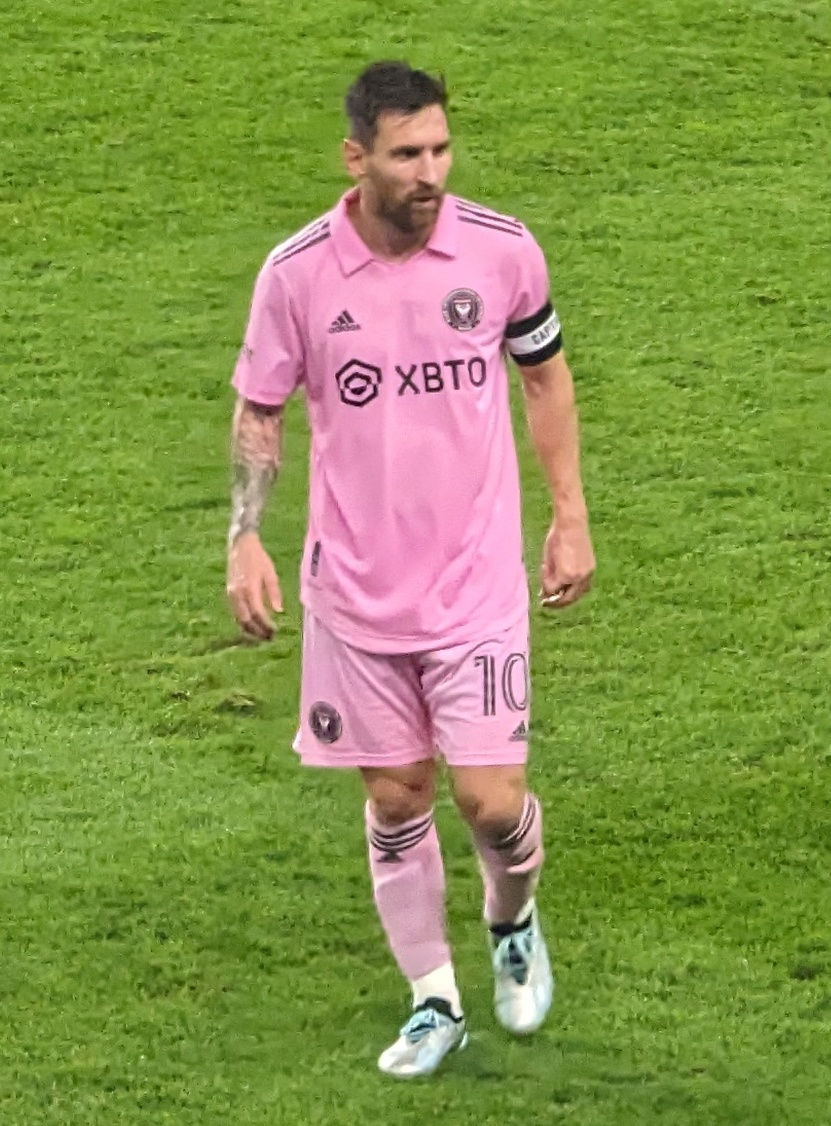
Messi with Inter Miami during the 2023 U.S. Open Cup

Messi made his debut for Inter Miami on 21 July, and would score nine goals in his first six games for the club. On 19 August, Miami triumphed over Nashville SC in the 2023 Leagues Cup final, giving the club their first ever trophy. Messi claimed the awards for best player of the tournament and the top scorer, with ten goals. Four days later, Messi assisted two goals in a 3–3 draw with FC Cincinnati in the semi-final of the 2023 U.S. Open Cup, then scored during the eventual penalty shootout as his team claimed victory. Miami lost the final to the Houston Dynamo with Messi unavailable for the match due to injury.

Messi made his MLS league debut on 26 August and scored a late goal in a 2–0 win against the New York Red Bulls, which put an end to Miami's 11-match league losing streak. On 30 October, following his 2022 FIFA World Cup win with Argentina and Ligue 1 trophy with PSG, Messi was awarded a record-extending eighth Ballon d'Or. He finished his first season for Miami with 11 goals in 14 matches, and was named Time Athlete of the Year, the first footballer to ever win the award. On 15 January 2024, Messi won The Best FIFA Men's Player for a record third time. He also extended his record number of appearances in the FIFPRO Men's World 11 to 17 straight appearances, having not missed out on the selection since 2006.

==== 2024: Supporters' Shield and Inter Miami's all-time top goalscorer ====
After missing four matches due to injury, Messi scored in a 2–2 draw against the Colorado Rapids on 6 April. A week later, Messi managed one goal and an assist in a 3–2 win over Sporting Kansas City; the match set a record for highest-ever attendance at Arrowhead Stadium with a crowd of 72,610. During a 6–2 win over the New York Red Bulls on 4 May, Messi broke the record for the most assists in an MLS game with five assists, and for the most goal contributions in an MLS game with six.

On 2 October, two goals from Messi in a 3–2 win against the Columbus Crew allowed Miami to secure the Supporters' Shield. During the last match of the regular season on 19 October, Messi came off the bench in the second half, and within 30 minutes scored his first hat-trick for Miami as they achieved a 6–2 victory over the New England Revolution. Messi finished the regular season with 20 goals and 16 assists in 19 matches, helping his team achieve a league record of 74 points, which earned them a place in the 2025 FIFA Club World Cup as the host. In doing so, Messi became Inter Miami's all-time top goalscorer. He was named the MLS Most Valuable Player following the conclusion of the regular season.

==== 2025: First MLS Cup championship ====
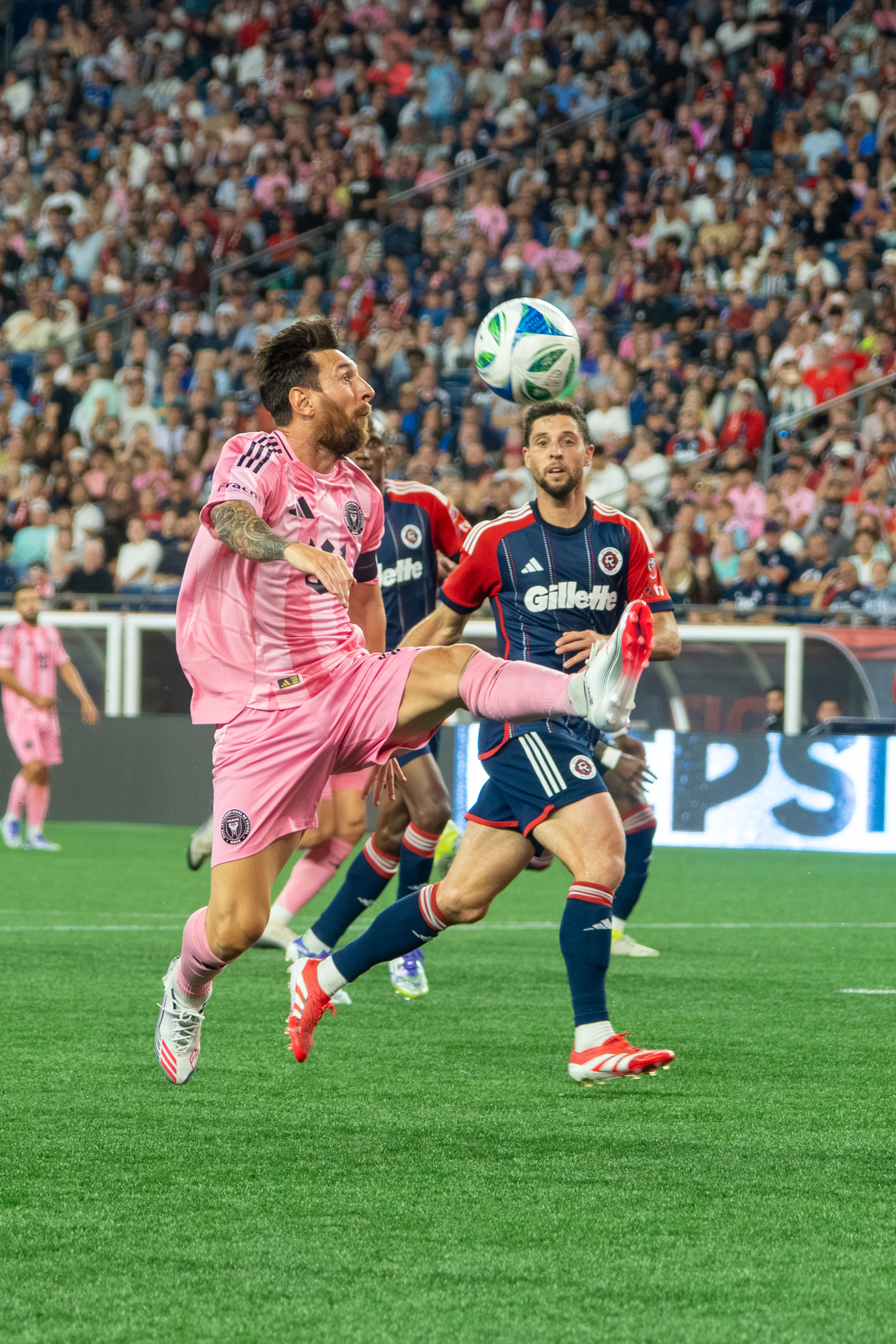
Messi with Inter Miami playing against the New England Revolution in 2025

In Inter Miami's first game of the year on 19 February 2025, Messi scored in a 1–0 victory against Sporting Kansas City during round one of the 2025 CONCACAF Champions Cup. Miami was eliminated from the tournament in the semi-finals on 30 April. On 5 June, Messi was voted MLS Player of the Month for May for contributing seven goals and four assists in seven matches.

On 19 June, Messi scored his 50th goal for Miami during a 2–1 win against Porto in the group stage of the 2025 FIFA Club World Cup. It was Messi's 25th goal in FIFA tournaments, which saw him surpass Marta's tally of 24 goals to become the all-time top goalscorer in FIFA competitions. Miami was knocked out of the tournament on 29 June following a 4–0 loss to Messi's former club Paris Saint-Germain. Messi led Miami to another Leagues Cup final on 31 August, where they lost 3–0 to the Seattle Sounders. Miami finished third in the Eastern Conference at the end of the regular season. Messi won the MLS Golden Boot as the league's top scorer, with 29 goals and 19 assists in 28 games. On 23 October, he extended his contract with the club until 2028.

On 24 October, during the first game of the 2025 MLS Cup playoffs against Nashville SC, Messi scored his 39th goal of the season, surpassing Carlos Vela and Denis Bouanga for the most goals scored by an MLS player across all competitions in a calendar year. On 23 November, during the Eastern Conference Semifinal against FC Cincinnati, Messi scored a goal and provided three assists in a 4–0 victory, putting his total career goal contributions at 1,300.

During the Eastern Conference Final against New York City FC on 29 November, an assist from Messi put his total career assists across all competitions at 405, which saw him surpass Ferenc Puskás for the most career assists of all time. Miami defeated the Vancouver Whitecaps 3–1 in the MLS Cup 2025, which was the team's first league championship. Messi was named MLS Cup MVP, and his 15 total goal contributions (6 goals and 9 assists) marked a new record for a single MLS postseason. At the end of the season, Messi was again named MLS MVP, becoming the first player in league history to win the award in back-to-back years.

==== 2026: 900 career goals and Campeones Cup victory ====
On 1 March 2026, Messi scored his 70th career free-kick goal, which saw him equal the tally of Pelé. (Note: Attributed to multiple references:) On 18 March, he scored his 900th career goal in a 1–1 draw with Nashville SC during the CONCACAF Champions Cup round of 16. Two months later, on 9 May, he recorded one goal and two assists in a 4–2 away win over Toronto, becoming the fastest player to reach 100 goal contributions (59 goals and 41 assists) in the MLS in 64 matches, surpassing previous record of Sebastian Giovinco. During the last match before the 2026 FIFA World Cup, Messi removed himself from the game during the 73rd minute of a 6–4 victory against Philadelphia Union, causing many to speculate that he was injured. It was later reported that he had experienced muscle fatigue in his left hamstring. On 29 August, Messi scored four goals, including two from direct free kicks, in a 7–1 victory over CF Montréal. On 16 September, he scored his 100th goal for Miami during their victory over Cruz Azul in the 2026 Campeones Cup.

== International career ==
=== 2004–2005: Youth career ===
As a citizen of both Argentina and Spain, Messi was eligible to play for the national team of either country. Selectors for the Spain national under-17 football team began pursuing him in 2003, but Messi declined their offer, having aspired to represent Argentina since childhood. To ensure Spain did not take Messi, the Argentine Football Association organised two under-20 friendlies in June 2004, with the purpose of finalising his status as an Argentina player in FIFA. On 29 June, at the age of 17, Messi made his debut for Argentina on the national under-20 football team. He scored once and provided two assists in a 8–0 victory over Paraguay.

==== 2005 South American Youth Championship ====
Messi was included in the squad for the South American Youth Championship, held in early 2005. Due to his former growth hormone deficiency, he lacked the stamina of his teammates, and was therefore used as a substitute in six of the nine games. After being named man of the match against Venezuela on 25 January, he scored the winning goal in the crucial last match on 6 February against Brazil, securing the team's third-place qualification for the 2005 FIFA World Youth Championship.

==== 2005 FIFA World Youth Championship ====
Messi employed a personal trainer to increase his muscle mass, and returned to the squad in an improved condition for the World Youth Championship in June 2005. After he was left out of the starting line-up in their first match, the squad's senior players asked manager Francisco Ferraro to let Messi start, as they considered him their best player. With Messi's help, the team defeated Egypt and Germany to progress past the group stage.

Messi proved decisive in several knockout phase matches. Prior to the final, he was awarded the Golden Ball as the best player of the tournament. He scored both goals in Argentina's 2–1 victory over Nigeria on 2 July, clinching the team's fifth championship and finishing the tournament as top scorer with 6 goals. His performance drew comparisons with his compatriot Diego Maradona, who had led Argentina's youth team to the title in 1979.

=== 2005–2007: Beginnings with the senior national team ===
In recognition of his achievements with the under-20 team, senior manager José Pékerman called the 18-year-old Messi up to the senior national team for a friendly on 17 August 2005 against Hungary. He came on in the 63rd minute, but was ejected from the match after two minutes for a perceived foul. Messi was reportedly found weeping in the dressing room after his sending-off. Messi returned to the senior team on 3 September 2005 in a 2006 World Cup qualifier match, a 1–0 defeat to Paraguay which Messi had declared his "re-debut". He scored his first international goal in a 3–2 friendly loss to Croatia on 1 March 2006. A hamstring injury a week later jeopardised his presence at the World Cup, but he recovered in time for the tournament.

==== 2006 FIFA World Cup ====
The 2006 FIFA World Cup in Germany was Messi's first international tournament with Argentina's senior team. Pékerman spoke with Messi ahead of the tournament, predicting that he was going to become the best player in the world. On 16 June, Messi became the youngest player to represent Argentina at a World Cup when he came on as a substitute against Serbia and Montenegro. During the match, he provided his first World Cup assist and scored his first World Cup goal. (Note: Attributed to multiple references:) Messi did not play in the quarter-final against Germany on 30 June, during which Argentina were eliminated in a penalty shootout. Pékerman's decision to leave him on the bench led to widespread criticism from those who believed Messi could have changed the outcome of the match. Pékerman stepped down as manager after the tournament.

==== 2007 Copa América ====
As Messi evolved into one of the best players in the world, he secured a place in Argentina's starting line-up. He assisted the game-winning goal of Argentina's 4–1 victory over the United States in the opening group match of the Copa América, then later scored the second goal of a 4–0 quarter-final victory against Peru. (Note: Attributed to multiple references:) On 15 July, Argentina lost the final 3–0 to a Brazil squad that lacked several of the nation's best players. The unexpected loss was followed by much criticism in Argentina, although Messi was mostly exempt due to his young age and his secondary status to the team's star player Juan Román Riquelme. Messi was named the best young player of the tournament and named to the team of the tournament.

=== 2008: Beijing Summer Olympics ===
Before the 2008 Summer Olympics in Beijing, FIFA ordered Barcelona to release Messi for the men's football tournament. However, the CAS legally barred Messi from representing Argentina at the tournament, as it coincided with Barcelona's Champions League qualifying matches. (Note: Attributed to multiple references:) After interference from the newly appointed Barcelona manager Pep Guardiola, the 21-year-old Messi was permitted to join the under-23 squad at the Olympics. (Note: Attributed to multiple references:) Messi's team reached the final against Nigeria, during which Messi assisted the only goal in Argentina's 1–0 victory. Along with Riquelme, Messi was singled out by FIFA as the stand-out player from the tournament's best team.

=== 2008–2011: Collective decline ===
==== 2010 FIFA World Cup qualification ====
In October 2008, former World Cup-winning captain Diego Maradona became the national team's manager, which began a three-year period of poor performances from Argentina. Maradona was criticised for his strategic decisions, which included playing Messi out of his usual position. In the eight 2010 World Cup qualification matches under Maradona's stewardship, Messi scored one goal, the opener in a 4–0 victory over Venezuela on 28 March 2009. During that game, he wore Argentina's number 10 shirt for the first time, following the international retirement of Riquelme. Argentina secured their place in the tournament after defeating Uruguay 1–0 in their last qualifying match on 14 October. Overall, Messi scored four goals in 18 appearances during the qualifying process.

==== 2010 FIFA World Cup ====
Despite their poor qualifying campaign, Argentina were considered title contenders at the 2010 FIFA World Cup, held in South Africa. Ahead of the tournament, Maradona visited Messi in Barcelona to request his tactical input. Messi outlined a 4–3–1–2 formation with himself playing behind the two strikers, a playmaking position known as the enganche in Argentine football, which had been his preferred position since childhood. During Argentina's opening match, Messi managed four attempts on goal. During their second match, he participated in all four goals in a 4–1 victory over South Korea. (Note: Attributed to multiple references:) Argentina were eliminated in the quarter-final by Germany on 3 July.

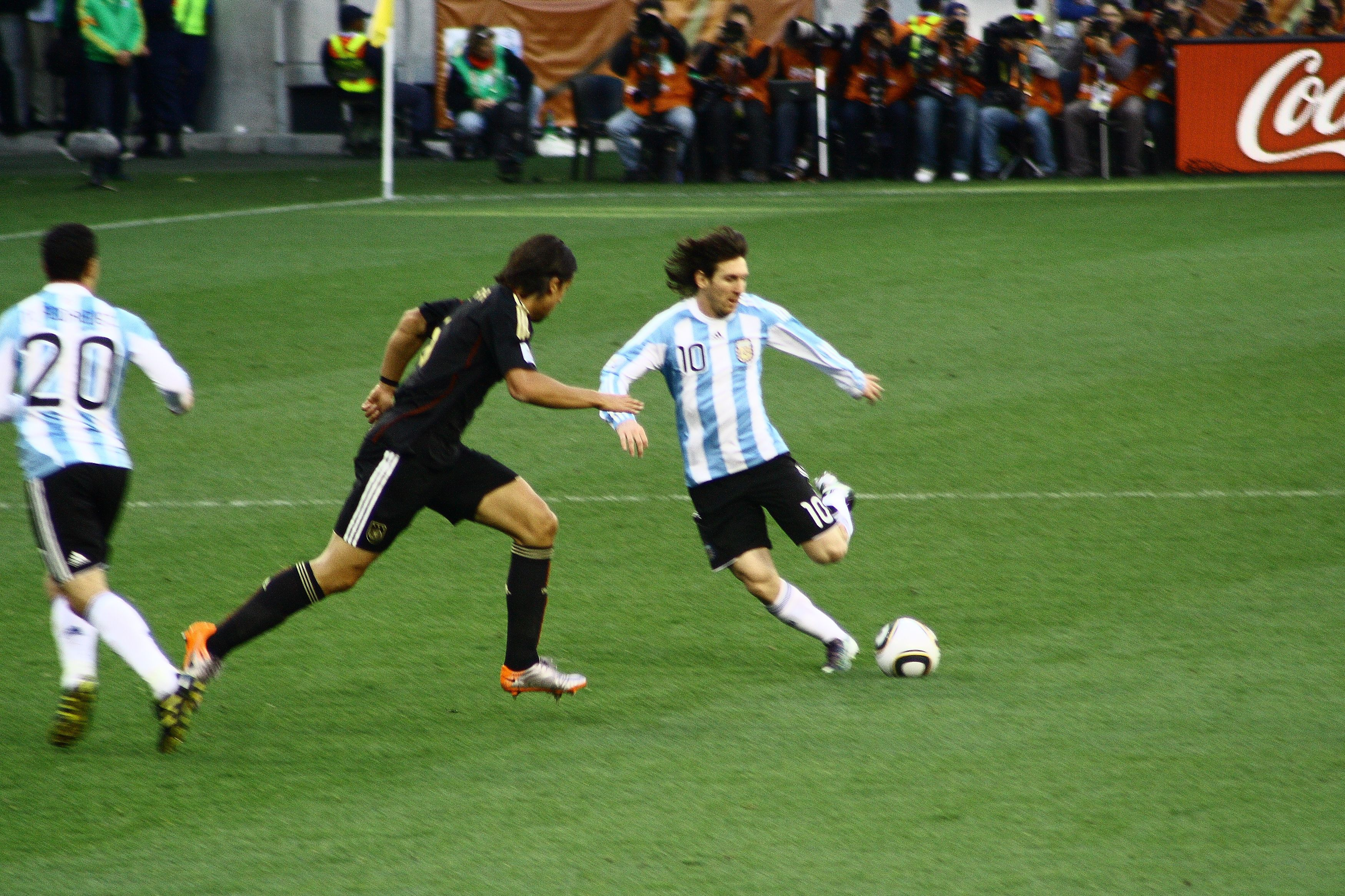
Messi playing against Germany at the 2010 FIFA World Cup

Messi failed to score throughout the tournament but provided a single assist. Nevertheless, FIFA identified him as one of the tournament's ten best players, citing his "outstanding" pace and creativity, and his "spectacular and efficient" dribbling, shooting and passing. Back in Argentina, however, Messi was the subject of harsher judgement. As the perceived best player in the world, he had been expected to lead an average team to the title, as Maradona arguably did in 1986. Messi's failure to perform as well with the national team as he did with Barcelona led to the accusation that he cared more about his club than his country.

==== 2011 Copa América ====
Maradona stepped down as manager and was replaced by Sergio Batista, who had orchestrated Argentina's 2008 Olympic victory. Batista publicly stated that he intended to build the team around Messi, employing him as a false nine within a 4–3–3 system, as used to much success by Barcelona. Although Messi scored a record 53 goals during the 2010–11 club season, he had not scored for Argentina in a competitive match since March 2009.

Despite the tactical change, Messi's goal drought in competitive matches continued during the 2011 Copa América. Media and fans noted that he did not combine well with Carlos Tevez, who enjoyed greater popularity among the Argentine public, and Messi was consequently booed by his own team's supporters for the first time in his career. Argentina was eliminated in the quarter-final on 16 July. Messi failed to score again in the final match but provided three assists, and was named to the team of the tournament.

=== 2011–2016: Assuming captaincy and three consecutive finals losses ===
==== 2014 FIFA World Cup qualification ====
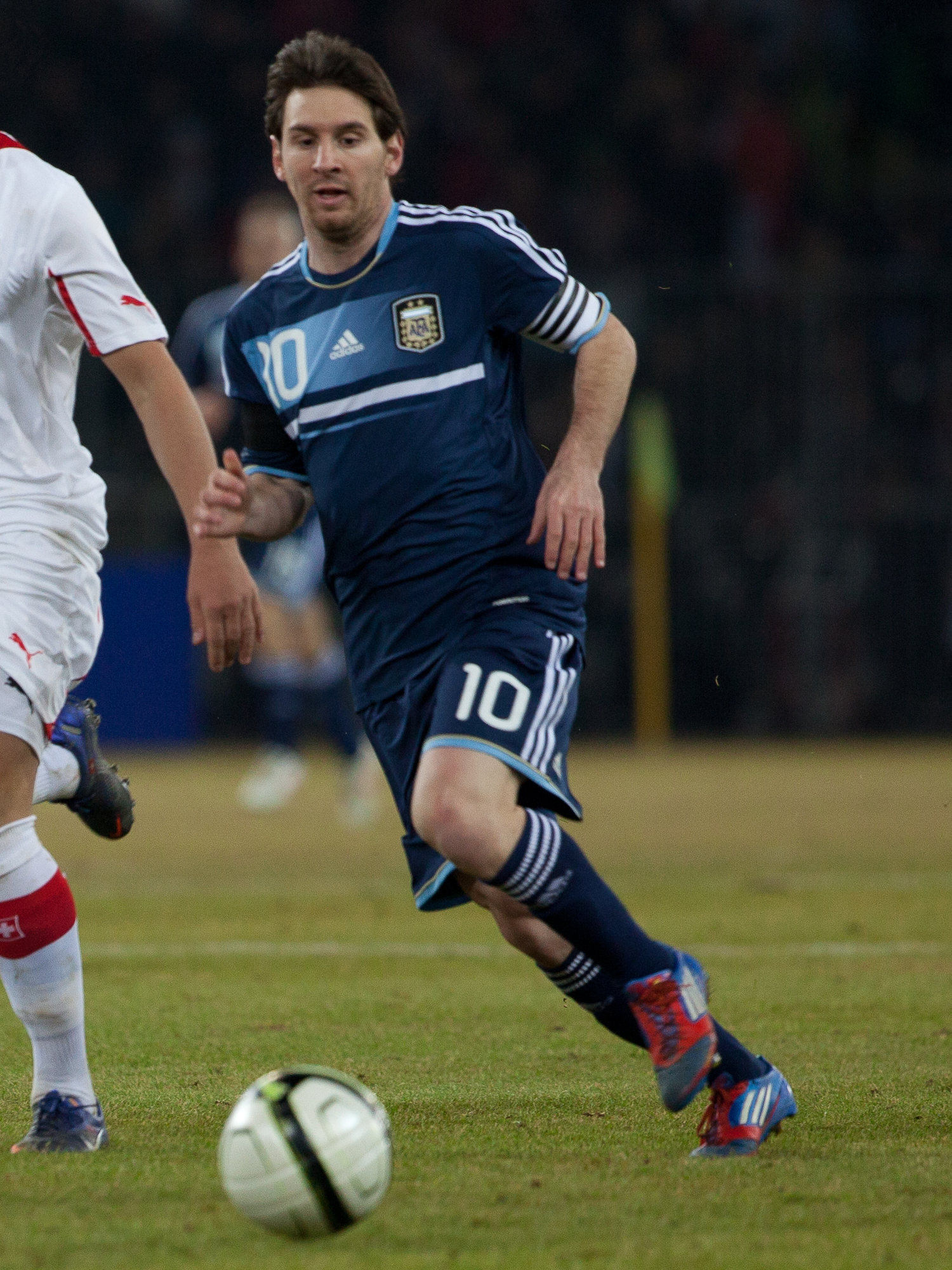
Messi scored his first international hat-trick against Switzerland in 2012.

In August 2011, Argentina's newly appointed manager Alejandro Sabella named Messi the team captain. Sabella also dismissed Tevez and brought in players with whom Messi had won the World Youth Championship and Olympic Games. Messi subsequently ended his goal drought by scoring during Argentina's first 2014 World Cup qualifying match, a 4–1 win over Chile on 7 October 2011, which was his first competitive goal for Argentina in two and a half years.

Under Sabella, Messi's goalscoring rate increased significantly. While he had scored only 17 goals in his previous 61 matches, he scored 25 times in 32 appearances during the following three years. Messi helped the team secure their place in the World Cup qualifiers with two goals in a 5–2 victory over Paraguay on 10 September 2013, bringing his international tally to 37 goals to become Argentina's second-highest goalscorer. He scored a total of 10 goals in 14 matches during the qualifying campaign. With his improved performance, Messi gradually began to be perceived more favourably in Argentina.

==== 2014 FIFA World Cup ====
Ahead of the World Cup in Brazil, doubts persisted over Messi's form, as he finished a lackluster and injury-plagued season with Barcelona. Regardless, Argentina was favoured by many to win the tournament, with pundits predicting that Messi would confirm his status as the best player in the world. Messi was named Man of the Match in Argentina's first four matches. During their second match, he scored a goal in extra time to secure a 1–0 win over Iran and qualification for the knockout phase.

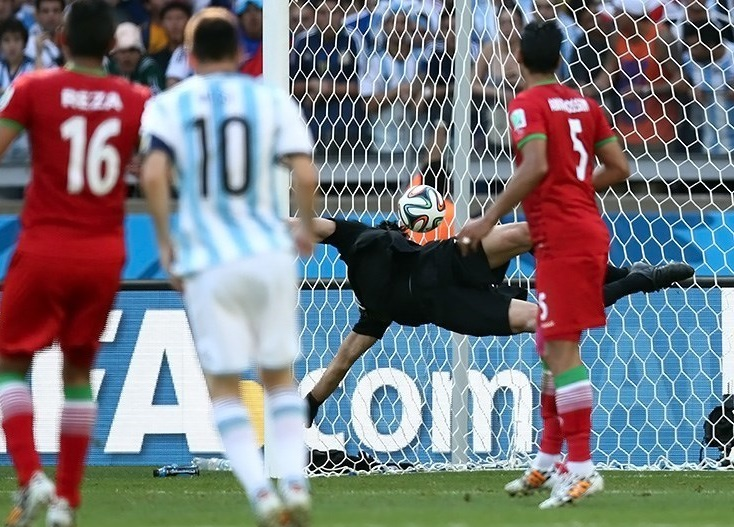
Messi watches his 25-yard strike hit the net during Argentina's 1–0 win over Iran in the group stage at the 2014 FIFA World Cup

Argentina progressed to the semi-final of the World Cup for the first time since 1990, then eliminated the Netherlands to reach the final. The match was billed as Messi versus Germany, the world's best player against the world's best team. Messi missed several opportunities to achieve goals during the match, and Argentina fell to Germany 1–0. Messi was awarded the Golden Ball as the best player of the tournament; his selection drew criticism based on his lack of goals in the knockout round, with Maradona suggesting that Messi had been selected for marketing purposes. (Note: Attributed to multiple references:) Messi again faced criticism in Argentina for his failure to achieve a victory.

==== 2015 Copa América ====
Messi made his 100th international appearance during the group stage of the 2015 Copa América. During the semi-final on 30 June, he provided three assists and helped create three more goals in a 6–1 victory over Paraguay. According to Jonathan Wilson of The Guardian, the Copa América saw Messi evolve from Argentina's symbolic captain into a genuine leader.

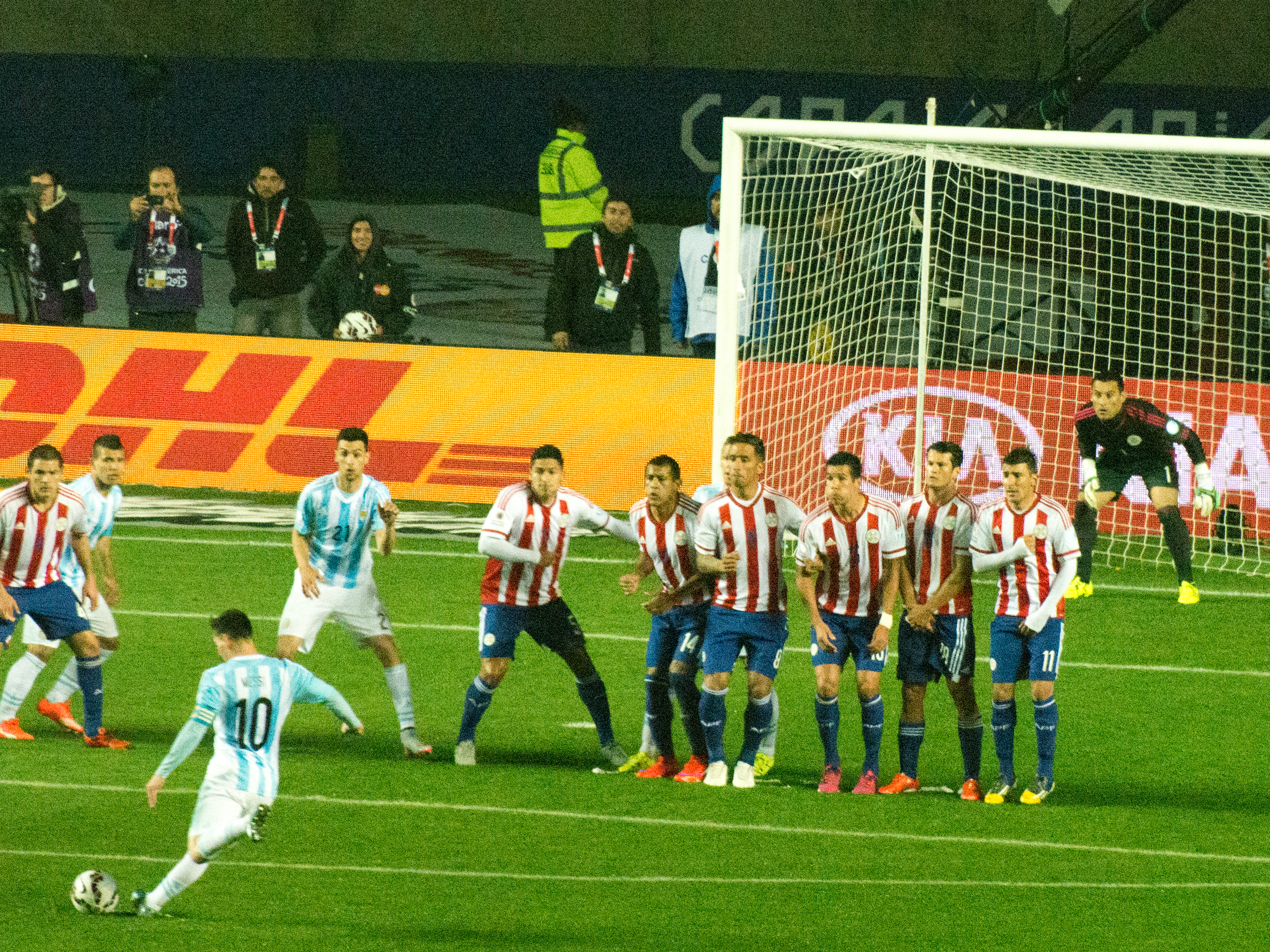
Messi taking a free kick against Paraguay during the 2015 Copa América semi-final

Argentina started the Copa América final on 4 July as the odds-on title favourites, but were defeated by Chile in a penalty shootout after a 0–0 draw. Faced with aggression from opposing players, including taking a boot to the midriff, Messi played below his standards, though he was the only Argentine to score during the shootout. At the close of the tournament, he was named to the team of the tournament and was reportedly selected to receive the Golden Ball award, but he rejected the honour. With Argentina now in the 22nd year of its trophy drought, the Copa América defeat again brought intense criticism for Messi from Argentine media and fans.

==== Copa América Centenario ====
Having suffered a deep bruise in his lumbar region in a pre-Copa América warm-up match, Messi was left on the bench in Argentina's 2–1 opening group match win over defending champions Chile on 6 June. In their second match against Panama, he came off the bench in the 61st minute and scored a hat-trick within 19 minutes in a 5–0 victory, securing Argentina's place in the knockout stage of the competition. He was elected man of the match for his performance.

In the quarter-final against Venezuela, Messi produced another man of the match performance, assisting two goals and scoring another in a 4–1 victory. Three days later, Messi's goal in a semi-final win against the United States made him the all-time top goalscorer in Argentina's history with 54 goals in official international matches. On Messi surpassing him as Argentina's top scorer, Gabriel Batistuta said he was unhappy to be in second place, but was consoled by the fact that he is second to an "extraterrestrial", referring to Messi's seemingly otherworldly talent. For his performance in the semi-final, Messi was named man of the match once again.

The Copa América Centenario final on 26 June was a repeat of the previous year's result, as Argentina once again lost to Chile on penalty kicks after a 0–0 draw. The loss was Messi's third consecutive defeat in a major tournament final with Argentina in three consecutive years, and his fourth overall. Messi finished the tournament as the second-highest goalscorer with five goals, and was the highest assist provider with four assists. He was named to the team of the tournament for his performances.

=== 2016–2019: Initial retirement and return ===
Losing his third consecutive final in three years weighed heavily on Messi. After the Copa América Centenario final, he announced his retirement from international football at 29 years old. He suggested that many wanted to see him retire, saying "I think this is best for everyone, firstly for me and for a lot of people that wish this."

Following his announcement, a nationwide campaign began in Argentina for Messi to change his mind about retiring. When the team landed in Buenos Aires, Messi was greeted by fans with signs saying "Don't go, Leo". Prominent national figures such as President Mauricio Macri and Diego Maradona publicly urged him to reverse his decision. Buenos Aires Mayor Horacio Rodríguez Larreta unveiled a statue of Messi to convince him to reconsider retirement, and the "Don't go, Leo" slogan appeared on traffic signs throughout the city. (Note: Attributed to multiple references:) One demonstration on 2 July saw hundreds of Messi supporters clamoring for his return in the pouring rain at the Obelisco de Buenos Aires.

A week after Messi announced his retirement, the Argentine newspaper La Nación reported that he was reconsidering playing for Argentina at the 2018 FIFA World Cup qualifiers in September. On 12 August, it was confirmed that Messi had reversed his decision. He said, "A lot of things went through my mind on the night of the final and I gave serious thought to quitting, but my love for my country and this shirt is too great." He was subsequently included in the squad for the national team's upcoming World Cup qualifiers by Argentina's new manager Edgardo Bauza.

==== 2018 FIFA World Cup qualification ====
During a World Cup qualifier win over Chile on 23 March 2017, Messi insulted an assistant referee, which earned him a suspension for four games and a fine of 10,000 CHF. After he sat out a match against Bolivia, his fine and the remainder of his suspension were lifted by FIFA following an appeal by the Argentine Football Association. After draws against Uruguay, Venezuela, and Peru, Messi's team was sixth in their group, and at risk of not appearing in the World Cup for the first time since 1970. In the final qualifying match against Ecuador on 10 October, Messi secured his country's World Cup entry with a hat-trick as Argentina came from behind to win 3–1.

==== 2018 FIFA World Cup ====
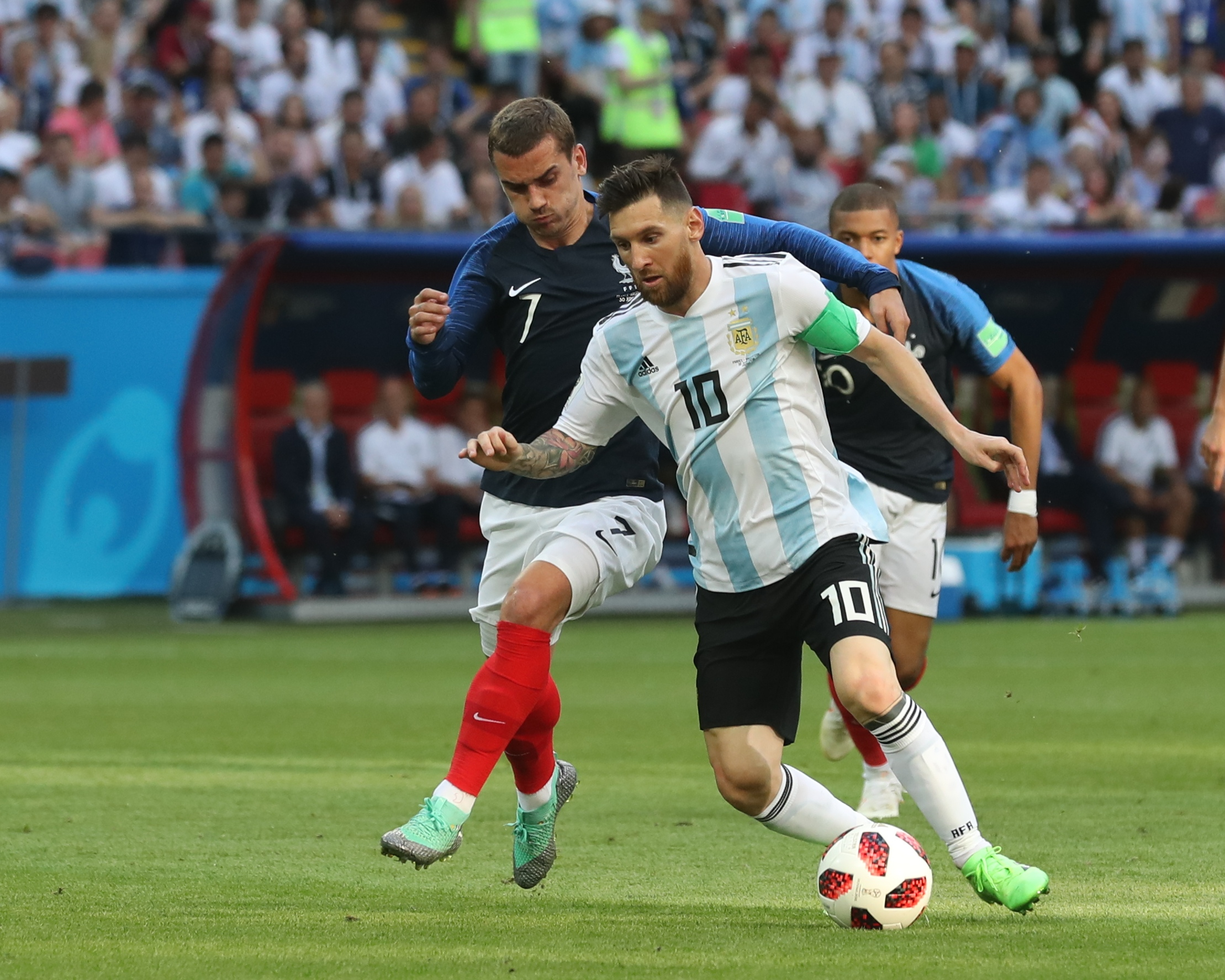
Messi battling past Antoine Griezmann of France at the 2018 FIFA World Cup

After Argentina's poor qualification campaign, expectations for the team were not high going into the 2018 FIFA World Cup in Russia. In their second game on 21 June, they lost 3–0 to Croatia in a major upset. Post-match coach Jorge Sampaoli spoke of the lack of quality in the team surrounding Messi, and Croatia captain Luka Modrić stated that "Messi is an incredible player but he can't do everything alone." In Argentina's final group stage match against Nigeria on 26 June, Messi scored one goal in an eventual 2–1 victory, and was named Man of the Match. (Note: Attributed to multiple references:) Argentina progressed to the knockout round, where they were eliminated by France. Following the World Cup exit, Messi did not participate in Argentina's September friendlies, commenting that he would most likely not represent his nation for the remainder of the calendar year. Messi's absence from the national team and his continued failure to win a title with Argentina prompted speculation in the media that Messi might retire from international football once again.

==== 2019 Copa América ====
A conversation with his idol Pablo Aimar and new Argentina manager Lionel Scaloni convinced Messi to return to the national team. (Note: Attributed to multiple references:) During the 2019 Copa América in Brazil, Messi was criticised in the media for his performance in the knockout stage. He admitted that it was not his best Copa América, while also criticising the poor quality of the pitches. Following Argentina's 2–0 semi-final defeat to Brazil on 2 July, Messi was critical of the refereeing, and alleged the competition was "set up" for Brazil to win.

In the third-place match against Chile on 6 July, Messi assisted Sergio Agüero's opening goal from a free kick in an eventual 2–1 victory, helping Argentina win the bronze medal. However, he was ejected from the match in the 37th minute after being involved in an altercation with Chilean defender Gary Medel, who was also sent off. Following the match, Messi refused to collect his medal and again accused the referees of corruption. He was initially fined only $1,500 for his comments, but the following month he was given an additional $50,000 fine by CONMEBOL and handed a three-month suspension from international play. Messi later apologised for his comments, and a portion of his suspension was later overturned.

=== 2020–2022: Ending Argentina's trophy drought ===
==== 2021 Copa América ====
On 6 July, Messi made his 150th appearance for Argentina in the semi-final of the Copa América against Colombia. Argentina won the match in a penalty shootout and progressed to the final, where they defeated Brazil 1–0. The victory gave Messi his first major international title and Argentina's first trophy since 1993. (Note: Attributed to multiple references:) Messi was involved in nine out of Argentina's 12 goals, scoring 4 and assisting 5. He was elected man of the match on four occasions during the tournament, was named player of the tournament, was named to the team of the tournament, and was awarded the Golden Boot. Commenting on the victory, Messi said, "It was clear to me that I had to try until the last tournament and that I couldn't withdraw from the national team without winning something."

==== 2022 FIFA World Cup qualification ====
On 9 September 2021, in a World Cup qualifier match against Bolivia, Messi scored a hat-trick during a 3–0 win, overtaking Pelé as South America's top male international scorer with 79 goals. After two subsequent wins against Uruguay and a draw with Brazil, Argentina secured a spot in the 2022 World Cup. (Note: Attributed to multiple references:)

==== 2022 Finalissima ====
Winning the 2021 Copa América allowed Argentina to participate in the 2022 Finalissima, the third edition of the CONMEBOL–UEFA Cup of Champions and the first in 29 years. The match was played in London on 1 June against Italy, the winners of UEFA Euro 2020. Messi assisted twice in Argentina's 3–0 victory, securing his second trophy for Argentina at the senior level. He was named Player of the Match.

==== 2022 FIFA World Cup ====
Argentina was one of the favorites to win the 2022 FIFA World Cup, as they were undefeated in their previous 36 matches. However, they lost their first game to Saudi Arabia, one of the lowest-ranked teams, in what was described as one of the greatest upsets in World Cup history. Argentina won their next two games against Mexico and Poland, advancing to the knockout stage. Messi had now played in 22 World Cup matches, the most of any Argentine. (Note: Attributed to multiple references:) With an assist in the 2–0 victory over Mexico, he became the first player to provide an assist in five consecutive World Cups.

In the round of 16, Messi scored the opening goal in Argentina's 2–1 win over Australia. It marked his first goal in a World Cup knockout round in what was his 1,000th senior career appearance. During the quarter-final against the Netherlands, Messi assisted Argentina's first goal, then scored from a penalty kick as the game finished 2–2 after extra time. Argentina won 4–3 in the penalty shoot-out, with Messi scoring the first penalty. In Argentina's 3–0 semi-final victory over Croatia, Messi scored his 11th World Cup goal, surpassing Gabriel Batistuta to become Argentina's all-time top scorer at the World Cup. He also registered his eighth World Cup assist and his record sixth knockout-stage assist. Argentina advanced to the final, with Messi stating that it would be his final World Cup appearance.

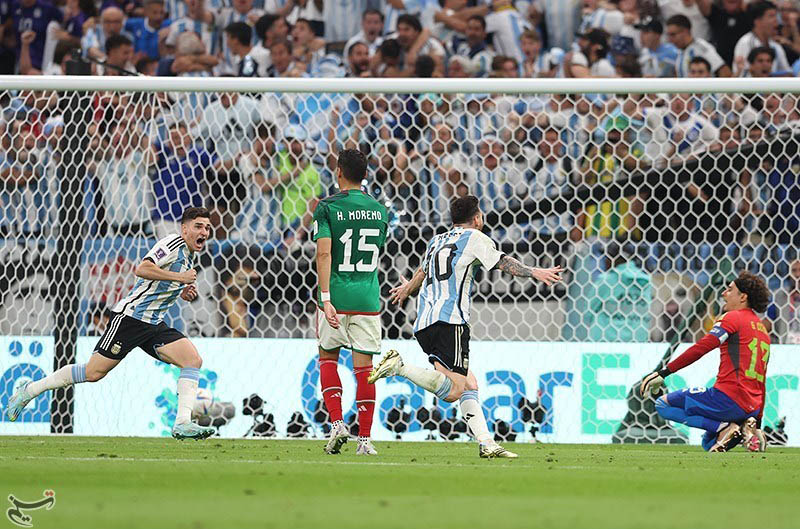
Messi celebrating after scoring a 25-yard strike against Mexico at the 2022 FIFA World Cup group stage

The 2022 World Cup final against France on 18 December is widely regarded as one of the most dramatic and exciting World Cup finals and one of the greatest football matches in the history of the sport. (Note: Attributed to multiple references:) Media coverage heavily framed it as a duel between Messi and his Paris Saint-Germain teammate, France's Kylian Mbappé. (Note: Attributed to multiple references:) Messi scored the opening goal with a penalty, and began the counter-attack that resulted in Argentina's second goal, scored by Ángel Di María. Two quick goals from Mbappé in the second half forced extra time, during which Messi restored Argentina's lead. Mbappé, however, equalized the score again. Messi then scored his team's first spot kick in an eventual 4–2 shoot-out victory, ending Argentina's 36-year wait for the World Cup Trophy.

With this World Cup triumph, Messi had won every top tier trophy at both club and national levels. The victory has been considered the capstone of his career, fulfilling for some commentators a previously unmet criterion to be regarded as the greatest player of all time. Messi received the tournament's Golden Ball, becoming the oldest player to win the award and the first to win it twice, and finished second in the Golden Boot race, behind Mbappé. He was named Player of the Match in five matches of the tournament, making him the player with the most Player of the Match awards. His appearance in the final marked his 26th World Cup match, setting a record for the most career World Cup appearances. To celebrate the World Cup victory, the government of Argentina declared a national holiday.

=== 2023–2026: Second consecutive Copa América title, return to World Cup final, and retirement ===
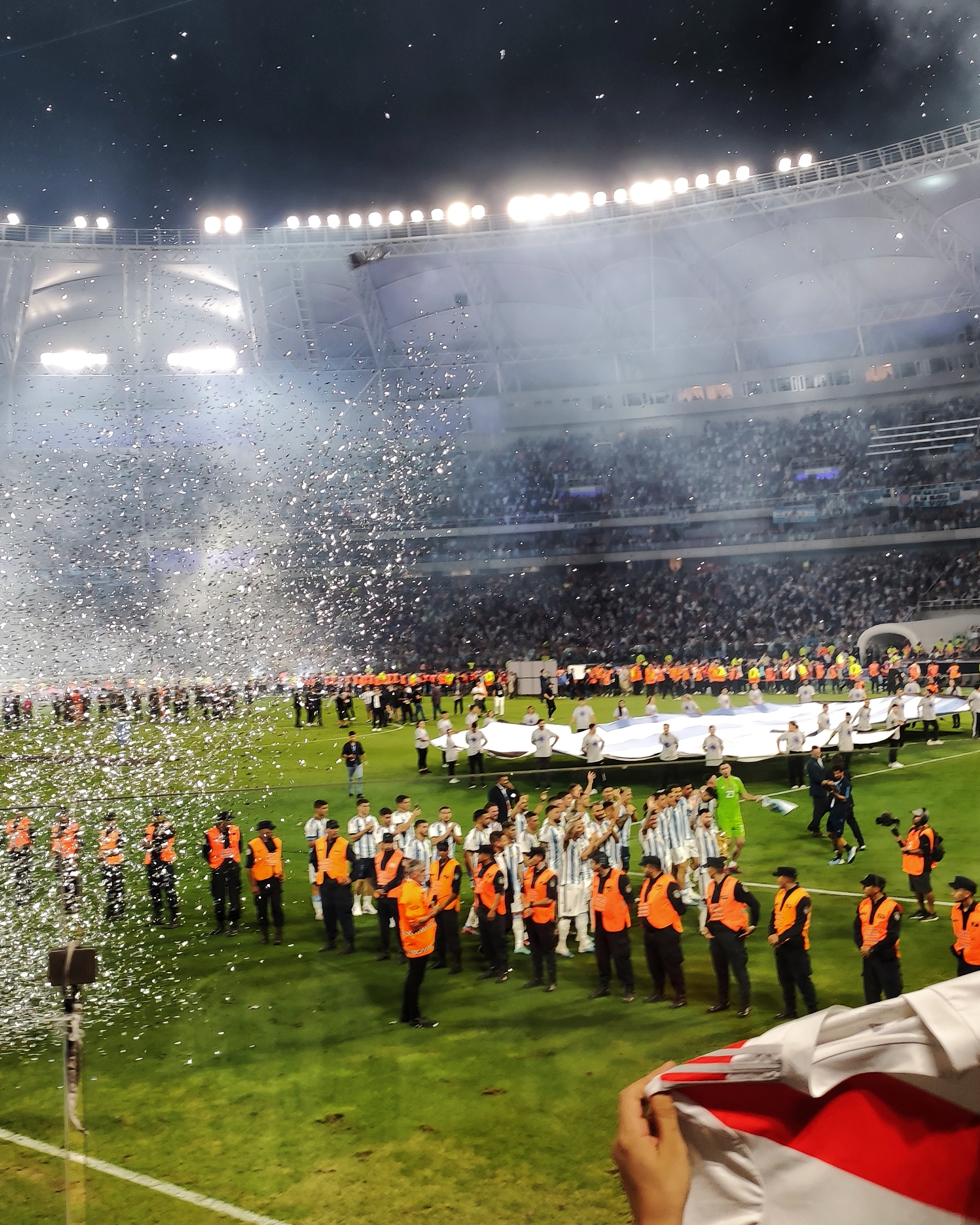
The Argentina national team celebrating their World Cup victory during a friendly in their home country

Three months after the World Cup victory, Messi and the national team returned to the pitch for two friendlies in Argentina. Messi scored his 800th senior career goal for club and country in the first match, against Panama. After the match, Messi gave a speech, lifted the World Cup Trophy and took a victory lap around the stadium as fireworks were set off. In the second friendly against Curaçao on 28 March, Messi's hat-trick during his team's 7–0 win made him the first South American player to reach 100 international goals and the third player overall to reach the milestone. During Argentina's 2026 World Cup qualification campaign, Messi became the all-time top goalscorer in CONMEBOL World Cup qualifiers, with 31 goals.

==== 2024 Copa América ====
On 21 June, Messi played in the opening match of the 2024 Copa América, becoming the player with the most Copa América matches played, with 35. (Note: Attributed to multiple references:) In the semi-final against Canada on 9 July, Messi scored the second goal in Argentina's 2–0 win, making him the second-highest international goalscorer in history with 109 goals. Messi suffered a severe ligament injury during the final against Colombia, but Argentina still managed to win the tournament. The victory brought Messi's team trophy total to 44, making him the most decorated player of all time. (Note: Attributed to multiple references:) He was subsequently named in the team of the tournament.

==== 2026 FIFA World Cup qualification ====
After recovering from his injury during the 2024 Copa América, Messi played in several qualifying matches for the 2026 FIFA World Cup. On 15 October 2024, he scored his 10th international hat-trick in a 6–0 win over Bolivia, equaling the record set by Cristiano Ronaldo. In March 2025, Argentina secured a World Cup berth. On September 4, Messi played his final World Cup qualifying match for the national team in Argentina, and would not confirm whether he will participate in the 2026 World Cup. (Note: Attributed to multiple references:) In a 6–0 friendly win against Puerto Rico on October 14, Messi's two assists brought his total international assists to 60, allowing him to surpass Neymar's 59 assists and become the top assist-provider in men's international football history.

==== 2026 FIFA World Cup ====
On 28 May 2026, Messi was named to the 26-man squad for the 2026 FIFA World Cup. Days earlier, he had experienced muscle fatigue in his left hamstring, raising concerns about his fitness for the tournament. He stayed on the bench during a pre-tournament friendly against Honduras, but was substituted onto the pitch and scored a penalty kick in the following friendly against Iceland.

During Argentina's opening match of the tournament, Messi achieved his first World Cup hat-trick as Argentina defeated Algeria 3–0. He became the player with the most career international hat-tricks, with 11. The match was his 200th international appearance, and he became the first male player to play in six World Cups and the second player to score in five World Cups. At 38 years and 357 days old, he also became the oldest player to score a World Cup hat-trick. On 22 June, Messi was named Man of the Match after scoring both of Argentina's goals in a 2–0 victory over Austria, which saw him surpass Miroslav Klose to become the all-time leading World Cup goalscorer with 18 goals, although his record was surpassed by Kylian Mbappé later in the tournament. The victory was also Messi's 18th career World Cup match win, surpassing Klose's record for most World Cup match wins. On 27 June, Messi scored during a record seventh consecutive World Cup match—breaking the previous record of six matches held by Just Fontaine and Jairzinho—as Argentina defeated Jordan 3–1.

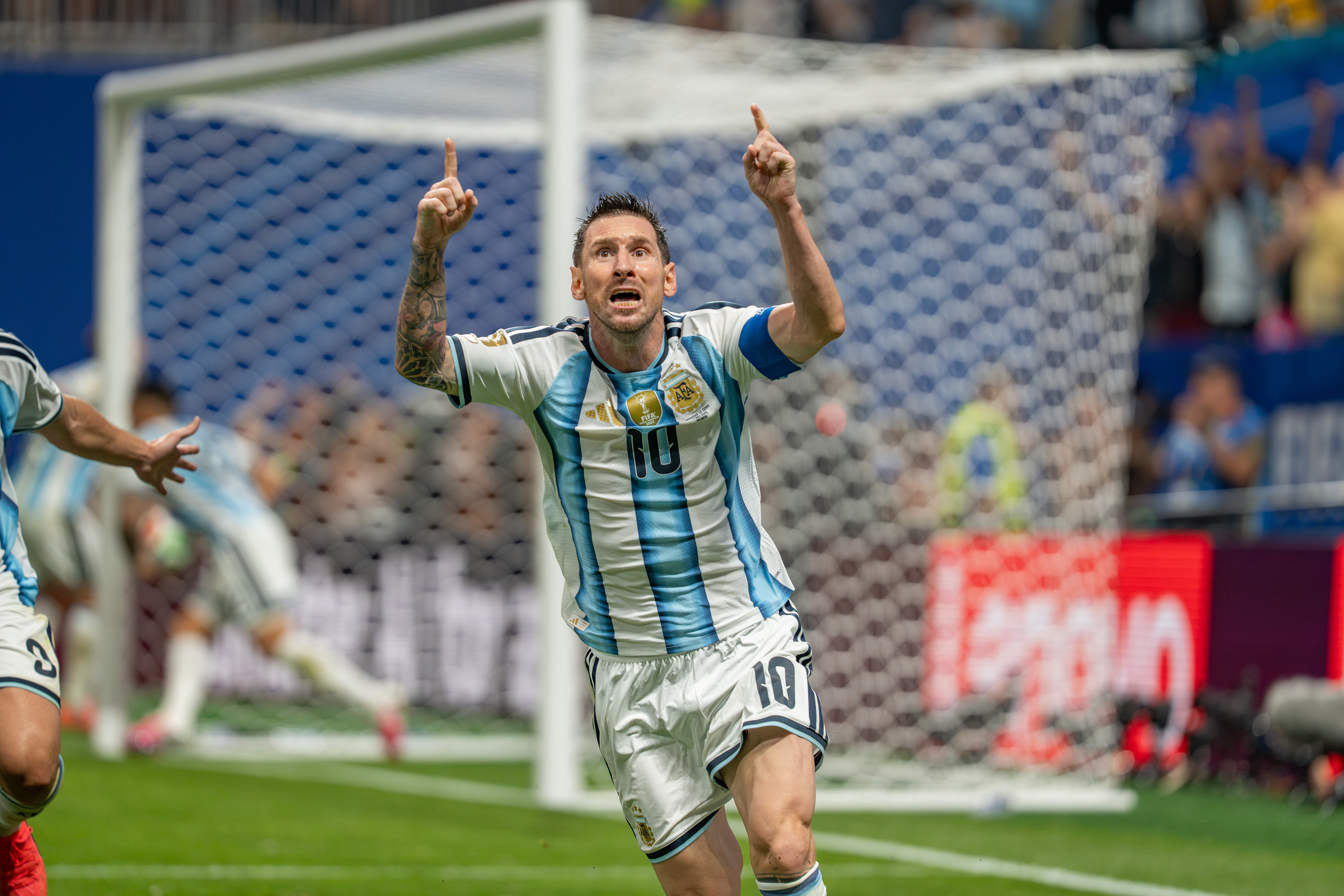
Messi celebrating after scoring a half volley against Egypt in the 2026 FIFA World Cup round of 16

In the round of 32 against Cape Verde, Messi scored in his eighth consecutive match in a 3–2 victory, and was named Man of the Match. (Note: Attributed to multiple references:) In the round of 16 against Egypt, Messi was named Man of the Match after scoring a goal and providing an assist in a 3–2 comeback victory, as Argentina recovered from a 2–0 deficit. He became the first player to score in six consecutive World Cup knockout matches, surpassing the five matches of György Sárosi and Vavá. He also became the second Argentine, after Guillermo Stábile, to score eight goals in a single World Cup. The assist was his ninth in World Cup tournaments, and he became the first player to serve an assist in six different World Cups. Messi also missed a penalty kick, becoming the first player in history to miss four World Cup penalties during their career.

Messi provided an assist in Argentina's 3–1 quarter-final victory over Switzerland, though his World Cup scoring streak ended at a record nine matches. He contributed two more assists in his team's 2–1 comeback win over England in the semi-final, bringing his World Cup assists total to a record 12 and helping his country reach their second consecutive World Cup final. He appeared in his third World Cup final, equalling Cafu's record for World Cup final appearances. At 39 years and 25 days old, he surpassed Gunnar Gren to become the oldest outfield player to appear in a World Cup final as Argentina lost 1–0 to Spain after extra time. Messi was awarded the Silver Boot as the second-highest goalscorer of the tournament, and the Silver Ball as the second-best player of the tournament. The IFFHS selected Messi as the tournament's best player.

==== Farewell match and retirement ====
Following the World Cup, Messi announced his retirement from international football on 31 August 2026. However, he was called up to the national team again for a final match against Benin at Estadio Monumental in Buenos Aires on 6 October. The game paused at the 10th minute as the stadium applauded Messi. Argentina won the match 3–0, with Messi assisting the first two goals and scoring the third goal from a penalty kick; he was named Man of the Match. After the match, a drone show displayed highlights of Messi's career, and Messi gave a farewell speech. He thanked the fans and apologized for not achieving another World Cup victory in 2026, but said his team had given their utmost effort in the attempt. Messi ended his international career as Argentina's leading scorer with 126 goals, and as their most-capped player with 208 appearances.
