= Copa América Centenario statistics =

Football tournament statistics

The following article outlines statistics for Copa América Centenario, which took place in the United States from June 3–26, 2016.

== Player statistics ==
=== Goalscorers ===
6 goals

- (Chile) Eduardo Vargas

5 goals

- (Argentina) Lionel Messi

4 goals

- (Argentina) Gonzalo Higuaín

3 goals

- (Brazil) Philippe Coutinho
- (Chile) Alexis Sánchez
- (United States) Clint Dempsey

2 goals

- (Argentina) Ezequiel Lavezzi
- (Argentina) Erik Lamela
- (Brazil) Renato Augusto
- (Chile) José Pedro Fuenzalida
- (Chile) Edson Puch
- (Chile) Arturo Vidal
- (Colombia) Carlos Bacca
- (Colombia) James Rodríguez
- (Ecuador) Enner Valencia
- (Panama) Blas Pérez
- (Venezuela) Salomón Rondón

1 goal

- (Argentina) Sergio Agüero
- (Argentina) Éver Banega
- (Argentina) Víctor Cuesta
- (Argentina) Ángel Di María
- (Argentina) Nicolás Otamendi
- (Bolivia) Juan Carlos Arce
- (Bolivia) Jhasmani Campos
- (Brazil) Gabriel Barbosa
- (Brazil) Lucas Lima
- (Chile) Charles Aránguiz
- (Colombia) Frank Fabra
- (Colombia) Marlos Moreno
- (Colombia) Cristián Zapata
- (Costa Rica) Celso Borges
- (Costa Rica) Johan Venegas
- (Ecuador) Michael Arroyo
- (Ecuador) Jaime Ayoví
- (Ecuador) Miller Bolaños
- (Ecuador) Christian Noboa
- (Ecuador) Antonio Valencia
- (Haiti) James Marcelin
- (Mexico) Jesús Manuel Corona
- (Mexico) Javier Hernández
- (Mexico) Héctor Herrera
- (Mexico) Rafael Márquez
- (Mexico) Oribe Peralta
- (Panama) Abdiel Arroyo
- (Panama) Miguel Camargo
- (Paraguay) Víctor Ayala
- (Peru) Christian Cueva
- (Peru) Edison Flores
- (Peru) Paolo Guerrero
- (Peru) Raúl Ruidíaz
- (United States) Jermaine Jones
- (United States) Bobby Wood
- (United States) Gyasi Zardes
- (United States) Graham Zusi
- (Uruguay) Mathías Corujo
- (Uruguay) Diego Godín
- (Uruguay) Abel Hernández
- (Venezuela) Josef Martínez
- (Venezuela) José Manuel Velázquez

1 own goal

- (Colombia) Frank Fabra (against Costa Rica)
- (Jamaica) Je-Vaughn Watson (against Uruguay)
- (Uruguay) Álvaro Pereira (against Mexico)

Source: CONMEBOL WorldFootball.net

=== Assists ===
4 assists

- (Argentina) Lionel Messi

3 assists

- (United States) Clint Dempsey

2 assists

- (Argentina) Ángel Di María
- (Argentina) Marcos Rojo
- (Brazil) Dani Alves
- (Chile) Arturo Vidal
- (Colombia) Edwin Cardona
- (Ecuador) Enner Valencia
- (Ecuador) Jefferson Montero
- (Mexico) Raúl Jiménez
- (Peru) Paolo Guerrero
- (Venezuela) Alejandro Guerra

1 assist

- (Argentina) Éver Banega
- (Argentina) Nicolás Gaitán
- (Argentina) Gonzalo Higuaín
- (Argentina) Ezequiel Lavezzi
- (Brazil) Elias
- (Brazil) Filipe Luís
- (Brazil) Gil
- (Brazil) Jonas
- (Chile) Jean Beausejour
- (Chile) José Pedro Fuenzalida
- (Chile) Fabián Orellana
- (Chile) Mauricio Pinilla
- (Chile) Alexis Sánchez
- (Chile) Eduardo Vargas
- (Colombia) Santiago Arias
- (Colombia) Juan Cuadrado
- (Colombia) Roger Martínez
- (Colombia) James Rodríguez
- (Costa Rica) Celso Borges
- (Costa Rica) Bryan Oviedo
- (Ecuador) Walter Ayoví
- (Ecuador) Christian Noboa
- (Ecuador) Antonio Valencia
- (Mexico) Jesús Manuel Corona
- (Mexico) Héctor Herrera
- (Panama) Abdiel Arroyo
- (Panama) Gabriel Gómez
- (Panama) Alberto Quintero
- (Peru) Edison Flores
- (Peru) Andy Polo
- (United States) Jermaine Jones
- (United States) Bobby Wood
- (United States) Gyasi Zardes
- (Uruguay) Nicolás Lodeiro
- (Uruguay) Carlos Sánchez
- (Venezuela) Christian Santos

Source: CONMEBOL WorldFootball.net

=== Clean sheets ===
4 clean sheets

- (Argentina) Sergio Romero

3 clean sheets

- (Chile) Claudio Bravo
- (Colombia) David Ospina
- (Peru) Pedro Gallese

2 clean sheets

- (United States) Brad Guzan
- (Venezuela) Dani Hernández

1 clean sheet

- (Brazil) Alisson
- (Costa Rica) Patrick Pemberton
- (Ecuador) Alexander Domínguez
- (Ecuador) Esteban Dreer
- (Mexico) Guillermo Ochoa
- (Paraguay) Justo Villar
- (Uruguay) Fernando Muslera

== Scoring ==
Overview

- Total number of goals scored: 91
- Average goals per match: 2.84
- Total number of braces: 7
  Gonzalo Higuaín (2), Renato Augusto, Edson Puch, Alexis Sánchez, Eduardo Vargas, Blas Pérez
- Total number of hat-tricks: 3
  Lionel Messi, Philippe Coutinho, Eduardo Vargas
- Total number of penalty kicks awarded: 4
- Total number of penalty kicks scored: 3
  Arturo Vidal, James Rodríguez, Clint Dempsey
- Total number of penalty kicks missed or saved: 1
  Luis Manuel Seijas
- Penalty kick success rate: 75%
- Own goals scored: 3
  Frank Fabra, Je-Vaughn Watson, Álvaro Pereira

Timing

- First goal of the tournament: Cristián Zapata for Colombia against United States
- First brace of the tournament: Blas Pérez for Panama against Bolivia
- First hat-trick of the tournament: Philippe Coutinho for Brazil against Haiti
- Fastest goal in a match from kickoff: 2nd minute
  Johan Venegas for Costa Rica against Colombia
- Fastest goal in a match after coming on as a substitute: 4 minutes
  Oribe Peralta for Mexico against Jamaica (introduced in the 77th minute), Jhasmani Campos for Bolivia against Chile (introduced in the 57th minute)
- Latest goal in a match without extra time: 90+10th minute
  Arturo Vidal for Chile against Bolivia
- Latest winning goal in a match without extra time: 90+10th minute
  Arturo Vidal for Chile against Bolivia
- Shortest time difference between two goals scored by the same team in a match: 2 minutes
  Erik Lamela and Ezequiel Lavezzi for Argentina against Bolivia

Teams

- Most goals scored by a team: 18
  Argentina
- Fewest goals scored by a team: 0
  Jamaica
- Most goals conceded by a team: 12
  Haiti
- Fewest goals conceded by a team: 2
  Argentina, Brazil, Peru
- Best goal difference: +16
  Argentina
- Worst goal difference: –11
  Haiti
- Most goals scored in a match by both teams: 8
  Brazil (7–1) Haiti
- Most goals scored in a match by one team: 7
  Brazil against Haiti, Chile against Mexico
- Most goals scored in a match by the losing team: 2
  Colombia against Costa Rica, Panama against Chile
- Biggest margin of victory: 7 goals
  Chile (7–0) Mexico
- Most clean sheets achieved by a team: 4
  Argentina
- Fewest clean sheets achieved by a team: 0
  Bolivia, Haiti, Jamaica, Panama
- Most clean sheets given by an opposing team: 3
  Jamaica
- Most consecutive clean sheets achieved by a team: 3
  Chile
- Most consecutive clean sheets given by an opposing team: 3
  Jamaica

Individual

- Most goals scored by an individual: 6
  Eduardo Vargas
- Most assists provided by an individual: 4
  Lionel Messi
- Most goals and assists produced by an individual: 9
  Lionel Messi (5 goals, 4 assists)
- Most clean sheets achieved by a goalkeeper: 4
  Sergio Romero
- Fewest clean sheets achieved by a goalkeeper: 0
  Carlos Lampe, Johny Placide, Andre Blake, Jaime Penedo
- Most consecutive clean sheets achieved by a goalkeeper: 3
  Claudio Bravo
- Most goals scored by one player in a match: 4
  Eduardo Vargas for Chile against Mexico
- Oldest goal scorer: 37 years and 113 days
  Rafael Márquez for Mexico against Uruguay
- Youngest goal scorer: 19 years and 283 days
  Gabriel Barbosa for Brazil against Haiti

== Attendance ==
- Overall attendance: 1,401,829
- Average attendance per match: 46,370
- Highest attendance: 83,263 – Mexico vs Jamaica
- Lowest attendance: 11,937 – Ecuador vs Peru

== Wins and losses ==
- Most wins: 5 – Argentina
- Fewest wins: 0 – Bolivia, Haiti, Jamaica
- Most losses: 3 – Bolivia, Haiti, Jamaica, United States
- Fewest losses: 0 – Argentina, Peru
- Most draws: 2 – Ecuador, Peru
- Fewest draws: 0 – Argentina, Bolivia, Chile, Haiti, Jamaica, Panama, United States, Uruguay
- Most points in the group stage: 9 – Argentina
- Fewest points in the group stage: 0 – Bolivia, Haiti, Jamaica

== Discipline ==
=== Summary ===
- Total number of yellow cards: 150
- Average yellow cards per match: 4.69
- Total number of red cards: 15
- Average red cards per match: 0.47
- First yellow card of the tournament:
  Alejandro Bedoya for United States against Colombia
- First red card of the tournament:
  Kendall Waston for Costa Rica against Paraguay
- Fastest yellow card from kick off: 1st minute
  Yeltsin Tejeda for Costa Rica against Paraguay
- Fastest yellow card after coming on as a substitute: 3 minutes
  Edson Puch for Chile against Colombia (introduced in the 75th minute)
- Latest yellow card in a match without extra time: 90+9th minute
  Luis Alberto Gutiérrez for Bolivia against Chile, Wálter Veizaga for Bolivia against Chile
- Latest yellow card in a match with extra time: 94th minute
  Matías Kranevitter for Argentina against Chile
- Fastest dismissal from kick off: 24th minute
  Rodolph Austin for Jamaica against Venezuela
- Latest dismissal in a match without extra time: 90+4th minute
  Kendall Waston for Costa Rica against Paraguay, Santiago Arias for Colombia against United States
- Shortest time difference between two yellow cards given to the same player: 1 minute
  DeAndre Yedlin for United States against Paraguay (booked in the 46th minute and again in the 47th minute)
- Most yellow cards (team): 17
  Chile
- Most red cards (team): 3
  United States
- Fewest yellow cards (team): 5
  Haiti, Jamaica, Uruguay
- Most yellow cards (player): 3
  Jean Beausejour, Arturo Vidal, Andrés Guardado, Arquímedes Figuera
- Most red cards (player): 1
  Marcos Rojo, Marcelo Díaz, Santiago Arias, Carlos Sánchez, Kendall Waston, Gabriel Achilier, Antonio Valencia, Rodolph Austin, Andrés Guardado, Aníbal Godoy, Óscar Romero, Jermaine Jones, Michael Orozco, DeAndre Yedlin, Matías Vecino
- Most yellow cards (match): 9
  Argentina vs Panama, United States vs Paraguay, Colombia vs Chile
- Most red cards (match): 2
  Mexico vs Uruguay, United States vs Ecuador, United States vs Colombia, Argentina vs Chile
- Fewest yellow cards (match): 1
  United States vs Colombia, Mexico vs Jamaica, United States vs Argentina
- Most cards in one match: 10
  Mexico vs Uruguay (8 yellow cards, 2 red cards), Argentina vs Panama, United States vs Paraguay, Colombia vs Chile (9 yellow cards, 1 red card), Argentina vs Chile (8 yellow cards, 2 red cards)

=== Sanctions ===
==== By match ====
Day	Home	Score	Away	Round	Referee	Total cards	Booked	(yellow card) (yellow-red card)	Sent off (straight red)
Group stage
1	United States	0–2	Colombia	Group A	(Mexico) Roberto García	1	1	0	0
2	Costa Rica	0–0	Paraguay	Group A	(Argentina) Patricio Loustau	6	5	0	1
2	Haiti	0–1	Peru	Group B	(Panama) John Pitti	5	5	0	0
2	Brazil	0–0	Ecuador	Group B	(Chile) Julio Bascuñán	6	6	0	0
3	Jamaica	0–1	Venezuela	Group C	(Peru) Víctor Carrillo	5	4	0	1
3	Mexico	3–1	Uruguay	Group C	(Paraguay) Enrique Cáceres	10	8	2	0
4	Panama	2–1	Bolivia	Group D	(Costa Rica) Ricardo Montero	7	7	0	0
4	Argentina	2–1	Chile	Group D	(Uruguay) Daniel Fedorczuk	6	6	0	0
5	United States	4–0	Costa Rica	Group A	(Ecuador) Roddy Zambrano	2	2	0	0
5	Colombia	2–1	Paraguay	Group A	(Brazil) Héber Lopes	5	4	1	0
6	Brazil	7–1	Haiti	Group B	(United States) Mark Geiger	2	2	0	0
6	Ecuador	2–2	Peru	Group B	(Colombia) Wilmar Roldán	5	4	1	0
7	Uruguay	0–1	Venezuela	Group C	(Argentina) Patricio Loustau	3	3	0	0
7	Mexico	2–0	Jamaica	Group C	(Brazil) Wilton Sampaio	1	1	0	0
8	Chile	2–1	Bolivia	Group D	(United States) Jair Marrufo	5	5	0	0
8	Argentina	5–0	Panama	Group D	(El Salvador) Joel Aguilar	10	9	1	0
9	United States	1–0	Paraguay	Group A	(Chile) Julio Bascuñán	10	9	1	0
9	Colombia	2–3	Costa Rica	Group A	(Venezuela) José Argote	5	5	0	0
10	Ecuador	4–0	Haiti	Group B	(Bolivia) Gery Vargas	2	2	0	0
10	Brazil	0–1	Peru	Group B	(Uruguay) Andrés Cunha	3	3	0	0
11	Mexico	1–1	Venezuela	Group C	(Cuba) Yadel Martínez	6	6	0	0
11	Uruguay	3–0	Jamaica	Group C	(Colombia) Wilson Lamouroux	2	2	0	0
12	Chile	4–2	Panama	Group D	(Ecuador) Roddy Zambrano	4	4	0	0
12	Argentina	3–0	Bolivia	Group D	(Peru) Víctor Carrillo	5	5	0	0
Knockout stage
13	United States	2–1	Ecuador	Quarter-finals	(Colombia) Wilmar Roldán	8	6	1	1
14	Peru	0–0 (2–4 p)	Colombia	Quarter-finals	(Argentina) Patricio Loustau	3	3	0	0
15	Argentina	4–1	Venezuela	Quarter-finals	(Mexico) Roberto García	5	5	0	0
15	Mexico	0–7	Chile	Quarter-finals	(Brazil) Héber Lopes	3	3	0	0
16	United States	0–4	Argentina	Semi-finals	(Paraguay) Enrique Cáceres	1	1	0	0
17	Colombia	0–2	Chile	Semi-finals	(El Salvador) Joel Aguilar	10	9	1	0
18	United States	0–1	Colombia	Third place play-off	(Uruguay) Daniel Fedorczuk	9	7	1	1
19	Argentina	0–0 (a.e.t.) (2–4 p)	Chile	Final	(Brazil) Héber Lopes	10	8	1	1

==== By referee ====
Referee	Nation	Pld	Red card	Yellow card	PK	Red Cards
Héber Lopes	Brazil	3	3	15	0	2 second yellow 1 straight red
Patricio Loustau	Argentina	3	1	11	0	1 straight red
Wilmar Roldán	Colombia	2	3	10	0	2 second yellow 1 straight red
Joel Aguilar	El Salvador	2	2	18	0	2 second yellow
Daniel Fedorczuk	Uruguay	2	2	13	0	1 second yellow 1 straight red
Enrique Cáceres	Paraguay	2	2	9	0	2 second yellow
Julio Bascuñán	Chile	2	1	15	0	1 second yellow
Víctor Carrillo	Peru	2	1	9	0	1 straight red
Roberto García	Mexico	2	0	6	2	—N/a
Roddy Zambrano	Ecuador	2	0	6	1	—N/a
Ricardo Montero	Costa Rica	1	0	7	0	—N/a
Yadel Martínez	Cuba	1	0	6	0	—N/a
Jair Marrufo	United States	1	0	5	1	—N/a
José Argote	Venezuela	1	0	5	0	—N/a
John Pitti	Panama	1	0	5	0	—N/a
Andrés Cunha	Uruguay	1	0	3	0	—N/a
Mark Geiger	United States	1	0	2	0	—N/a
Wilson Lamouroux	Colombia	1	0	2	0	—N/a
Gery Vargas	Bolivia	1	0	2	0	—N/a
Wilton Sampaio	Brazil	1	0	1	0	—N/a

==== By team ====
Team	Red card	Yellow card	Red Cards	Suspensions
United States	3	16	D. Yedlin vs Paraguay (second booking); J. Jones vs Ecuador (straight red); M. Orozco (straight red)	D. Yedlin vs Ecuador; J. Jones vs Argentina; A. Bedoya vs Argentina; B. Wood vs Argentina; M. Orozco next United States match
Colombia	2	12	C. Sánchez vs Chile (second booking); S. Arias (second booking)	C. Sánchez vs United States; S. Arias next Colombia match
Ecuador	2	9	G. Achilier vs Peru (second booking); A. Valencia vs United States (second booking)	G. Achilier vs Haiti; A. Valencia next Ecuador match J. C. Paredes next Ecuador match
Chile	1	17	M. Díaz vs Argentina (second booking)	M. Isla vs Mexico; A. Vidal vs Colombia; M. Díaz next Chile match
Panama	1	14	A. Godoy vs Argentina (second booking)	A. Godoy vs Chile; F. Baloy vs Chile; A. Cooper vs Chile; B. Pérez vs Chile; H. Cummings next Panama match
Argentina	1	11	M. Rojo vs Chile (straight red)	N. Gaitán vs United States; M. Rojo next Argentina match
Paraguay	1	9	Ó. Romero vs Colombia (second booking)	Ó. Romero vs United States
Mexico	1	7	A. Guardado vs Uruguay (second booking)	A. Guardado vs Jamaica
Costa Rica	1	6	K. Waston vs Paraguay (straight red)	K. Waston vs United States
Jamaica	1	5	R. Austin vs Venezuela (straight red)	R. Austin vs Mexico; M. Hector next Jamaica match
Uruguay	1	5	M. Vecino vs Mexico (second booking)	M. Vecino vs Venezuela
Venezuela	0	13	—N/a	A. Figuera vs Mexico; L. M. Seijas next Venezuela match
Bolivia	0	9	—N/a	J. Campos next Bolivia match
Brazil	0	6	—N/a	Casemiro vs Peru
Peru	0	6	—N/a	Y. Yotún vs Colombia
Haiti	0	5	—N/a	—N/a

==== By individual ====
Player	Team	Red card	Yellow card	Suspended for match(es):
Andrés Guardado	Mexico	1	3	vs Uruguay
Gabriel Achilier	Ecuador	1	2	vs Haiti
Santiago Arias	Colombia	1	2	—N/a (Note: As Arias was sent off in Colombia's last match of the tournament, he had to serve a suspension during the next competitive game of Colombia.)
Marcelo Díaz	Chile	1	2	—N/a (Note: As Díaz was sent off in Chile's last match of the tournament, he had to serve a suspension during the next competitive game of Chile.)
Aníbal Godoy	Panama	1	2	vs Chile
Jermaine Jones	United States	1	2	vs Argentina
Michael Orozco	United States	1	2	—N/a (Note: As Orozco was sent off in the United States' last match of the tournament, he had to serve a suspension during the next competitive game of the United States.)
Óscar Romero	Paraguay	1	2	vs United States
Carlos Sánchez	Colombia	1	2	vs United States
Antonio Valencia	Ecuador	1	2	—N/a (Note: As Valencia was sent off in Ecuador's last match of the tournament, he had to serve a suspension during the next competitive game of Ecuador.)
Matías Vecino	Uruguay	1	2	vs Venezuela
DeAndre Yedlin	United States	1	2	vs Ecuador
Rodolph Austin	Jamaica	1	1	vs Mexico
Marcos Rojo	Argentina	1	1	—N/a (Note: As Rojo was sent off in Argentina's last match of the tournament, he had to serve a suspension during the next competitive game of Argentina.)
Kendall Waston	Costa Rica	1	1	vs United States
Jean Beausejour	Chile	0	3	—N/a
Arquímedes Figuera	Venezuela	0	3	vs Mexico
Arturo Vidal	Chile	0	3	vs Colombia
Felipe Baloy	Panama	0	2	vs Chile
Alejandro Bedoya	United States	0	2	vs Argentina
Jhasmani Campos	Bolivia	0	2	—N/a
Casemiro	Brazil	0	2	vs Peru
Armando Cooper	Panama	0	2	vs Chile
Harold Cummings	Panama	0	2	—N/a
Nicolás Gaitán	Argentina	0	2	vs United States
Michael Hector	Jamaica	0	2	—N/a
Mauricio Isla	Chile	0	2	vs Mexico
Javier Mascherano	Argentina	0	2	—N/a
Jeison Murillo	Colombia	0	2	—N/a
Juan Carlos Paredes	Ecuador	0	2	—N/a
Blas Pérez	Panama	0	2	vs Chile
Luis Manuel Seijas	Venezuela	0	2	—N/a
Bobby Wood	United States	0	2	vs Argentina
Yoshimar Yotún	Peru	0	2	vs Colombia
Jean Alexandre	Haiti	0	1	—N/a
Charles Aránguiz	Chile	0	1	—N/a
Juan Carlos Arce	Bolivia	0	1	—N/a
Víctor Ayala	Paraguay	0	1	—N/a
Jaime Ayoví	Ecuador	0	1	—N/a
Randall Azofeifa	Costa Rica	0	1	—N/a
Pedro Azogue	Bolivia	0	1	—N/a
Carlos Bacca	Colombia	0	1	—N/a
Éver Banega	Argentina	0	1	—N/a
Jorge Benítez	Paraguay	0	1	—N/a
Matt Besler	United States	0	1	—N/a
Michael Bradley	United States	0	1	—N/a
Claudio Bravo	Chile	0	1	—N/a
John Brooks	United States	0	1	—N/a
Miguel Camargo	Panama	0	1	—N/a
Joel Campbell	Costa Rica	0	1	—N/a
Juan Cuadrado	Colombia	0	1	—N/a
Víctor Cuesta	Argentina	0	1	—N/a
Ángel Di María	Argentina	0	1	—N/a
Farid Díaz	Colombia	0	1	—N/a
Ronald Eguino	Bolivia	0	1	—N/a
Elias	Brazil	0	1	—N/a
Augusto Fernández	Argentina	0	1	—N/a
Romain Genevois	Haiti	0	1	—N/a
Gil	Brazil	0	1	—N/a
José Giménez	Uruguay	0	1	—N/a
Diego Godín	Uruguay	0	1	—N/a
Alexander González	Venezuela	0	1	—N/a
Derlis González	Paraguay	0	1	—N/a
Réginal Goreux	Haiti	0	1	—N/a
Carlos Gruezo	Ecuador	0	1	—N/a
Paolo Guerrero	Peru	0	1	—N/a
Luis Alberto Gutiérrez	Bolivia	0	1	—N/a
Brad Guzan	United States	0	1	—N/a
Nelson Haedo Valdez	Paraguay	0	1	—N/a
Amílcar Henríquez	Panama	0	1	—N/a
Luis Henríquez	Panama	0	1	—N/a
Pablo Hernández	Chile	0	1	—N/a
Héctor Herrera	Mexico	0	1	—N/a
Raúl Jiménez	Mexico	0	1	—N/a
Fabian Johnson	United States	0	1	—N/a
Matías Kranevitter	Argentina	0	1	—N/a
Kevin Lafrance	Haiti	0	1	—N/a
Miguel Layún	Mexico	0	1	—N/a
Dario Lezcano	Paraguay	0	1	—N/a
Lucas Lima	Brazil	0	1	—N/a
Adolfo Machado	Panama	0	1	—N/a
James Marcelin	Haiti	0	1	—N/a
Adrian Mariappa	Jamaica	0	1	—N/a
Josef Martínez	Venezuela	0	1	—N/a
Roger Martínez	Colombia	0	1	—N/a
Rónald Matarrita	Costa Rica	0	1	—N/a
Gary Medel	Chile	0	1	—N/a
Alejandro Meleán	Bolivia	0	1	—N/a
Lionel Messi	Argentina	0	1	—N/a
Jesús Molina	Mexico	0	1	—N/a
Celso Ortiz	Paraguay	0	1	—N/a
Patrick Pemberton	Costa Rica	0	1	—N/a
Adalberto Peñaranda	Venezuela	0	1	—N/a
Maxi Pereira	Uruguay	0	1	—N/a
Edson Puch	Chile	0	1	—N/a
Renato Augusto	Brazil	0	1	—N/a
Alberto Rodríguez	Peru	0	1	—N/a
James Rodríguez	Colombia	0	1	—N/a
Juan Rodrigo Rojas	Paraguay	0	1	—N/a
Salomón Rondón	Venezuela	0	1	—N/a
Alexis Sánchez	Chile	0	1	—N/a
Christian Santos	Venezuela	0	1	—N/a
Francisco Silva	Chile	0	1	—N/a
Renato Tapia	Peru	0	1	—N/a
Yeltsin Tejeda	Costa Rica	0	1	—N/a
Enner Valencia	Ecuador	0	1	—N/a
Wálter Veizaga	Bolivia	0	1	—N/a
José Manuel Velázquez	Venezuela	0	1	—N/a
Óscar Vílchez	Peru	0	1	—N/a
Oswaldo Vizcarrondo	Venezuela	0	1	—N/a
Je-Vaughn Watson	Jamaica	0	1	—N/a
Wilker Ángel	Venezuela	0	1	—N/a
Chris Wondolowski	United States	0	1	—N/a
Cristián Zapata	Colombia	0	1	—N/a
Edward Zenteno	Bolivia	0	1	—N/a

== Overall statistics ==
Team	Pld	W	D	L	Pts	APts	GF	AGF	GA	AGA	GD	AGD	CS	ACS	YC	AYC	RC	ARC
Argentina	**6**	**5**	1	0	**16**	**2.67**	**18**	**3.00**	2	0.33	**+16**	**2.67**	**4**	0.67	11	1.83	1	0.17
Bolivia	3	0	0	**3**	0	0.00	2	0.67	7	2.33	−5	−1.67	0	0.00	9	3.00	0	0.00
Brazil	3	1	1	1	4	1.33	7	2.33	2	0.67	+5	1.67	1	0.33	6	2.00	0	0.00
**Chile**	**6**	4	1	1	13	2.17	16	2.67	5	0.83	+11	1.83	3	0.50	**17**	2.83	1	0.17
Colombia	**6**	3	1	2	10	1.67	7	1.17	6	1.00	+1	0.17	3	0.50	12	2.00	2	0.33
Costa Rica	3	1	1	1	4	1.33	3	1.00	6	2.00	−3	−1.00	1	0.33	6	2.00	1	0.33
Ecuador	4	1	**2**	1	5	1.25	7	1.75	4	1.00	+3	0.75	2	0.50	9	2.25	2	**0.50**
Haiti	3	0	0	**3**	0	0.00	1	0.33	**12**	**4.00**	−11	−3.67	0	0.00	5	1.67	0	0.00
Jamaica	3	0	0	**3**	0	0.00	0	0.00	6	2.00	−6	−2.00	0	0.00	5	1.67	1	0.33
Mexico	4	2	1	1	7	1.75	6	1.50	9	2.25	−3	−0.75	1	0.25	7	1.75	1	0.25
Panama	3	1	0	2	3	1.00	4	1.33	10	3.33	−6	−2.00	0	0.00	14	**4.67**	1	0.33
Paraguay	3	0	1	2	1	0.33	1	0.33	3	1.00	−2	−0.67	1	0.33	9	3.00	1	0.33
Peru	4	2	**2**	0	8	2.00	4	1.00	2	0.50	+2	0.50	3	**0.75**	6	1.50	0	0.00
United States	**6**	3	0	**3**	9	1.50	7	1.17	8	1.33	−1	−0.17	2	0.33	16	2.67	**3**	**0.50**
Uruguay	3	1	0	2	3	1.00	4	1.33	4	1.33	0	0.00	1	0.33	5	1.67	1	0.33
Venezuela	4	2	1	1	7	1.75	4	1.00	5	1.25	−1	−0.25	2	0.50	13	3.25	0	0.00
Total	32^{(1)}	26	6^{(2)}	26	90	1.41	91	1.42	91	1.42	0	0.00	24	0.38	150	2.34	15	0.23

Updated to games played on June 26, 2016. Team(s) rendered in italics represent(s) the host nation(s). The competition's winning team is rendered in bold.
^{(1)} – Total games lost not counted in total games played (total games lost = total games won)
^{(2)} – Total number of games drawn (tied) for all teams = Total number of games drawn (tied) ÷ 2 (both teams involved)
^{(3)} – As per statistical convention in football, matches decided in extra time are counted as wins and losses, while matches decided by penalty shoot-outs are counted as draws.
