= Arquímedes Figuera =

Venezuelan footballer (born 1989)

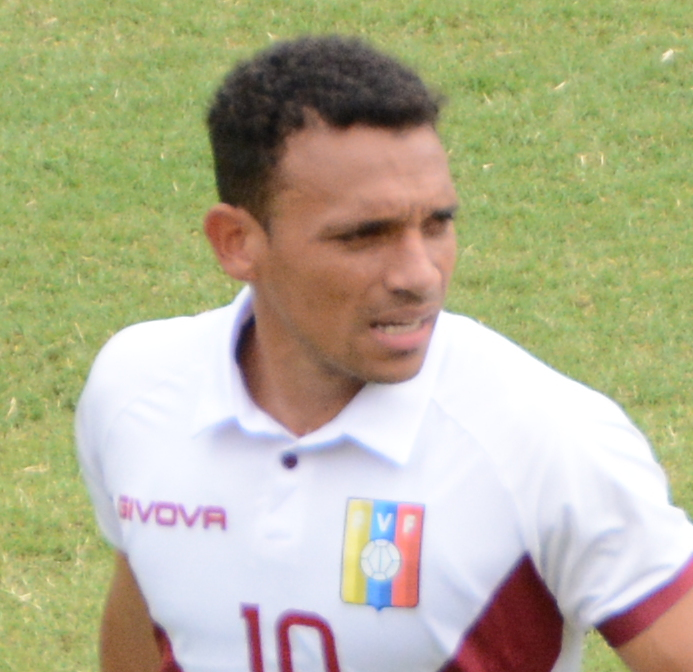
- Figuera with the Venezuela team in 2019

Personal information
- Full name: Arquímedes José Figuera Salazar
- Date of birth: 6 October 1989 (age 37)
- Place of birth: Cumaná, Venezuela
- Height: 1.70 m (5 ft 7 in)
- Position: Midfielder

Team information
- Current team: UTC
- Number: 16

Youth career
- Nueva Cádiz Fútbol Club

Senior career*
Years	Team	Apps	(Gls)
2009–2013	Trujillanos	111	(3)
2014–2016	Deportivo La Guaira	70	(2)
2017–2019	Universitario	64	(2)
2019	Deportivo La Guaira	12	(0)
2020–2022	César Vallejo	68	(0)
2023-2024	Blooming	46	(0)
2026-	UTC	2	(0)

International career^{‡}
2012–	Venezuela	28	(1)
- * Club domestic league appearances and goals as of 30 December 2025 ‡ National team caps and goals as of 21:02, 08 January 2020 (UTC)

Arquímedes José Figuera Salazar (born 6 October 1989) is a Venezuelan international footballer who plays for UTC as a midfielder.

== Career ==
Figuera started his career with Cumaná based Nueva Cádiz Fútbol Club. He joined later than to Fuguera, who was 2009 promoted to the seniorteam of Trujillanos.

=== International ===
21 January 2009 takes for the U-20 of Venezuela and attended the Sudamericano Sub-20 in Venezuela.

Figuera has made 22 appearances for the Venezuela national football team since 2012.

=== International goals ===
Scores and results list Venezuela's goal tally first.

Goal	Date	Venue	Opponent	Score	Result	Competition
1.	4 February 2015	Estadio Olímpico Metropolitano, San Pedro Sula, Honduras	Honduras	2–0	3–2	Friendly
