= Copa América Centenario final =

International soccer match

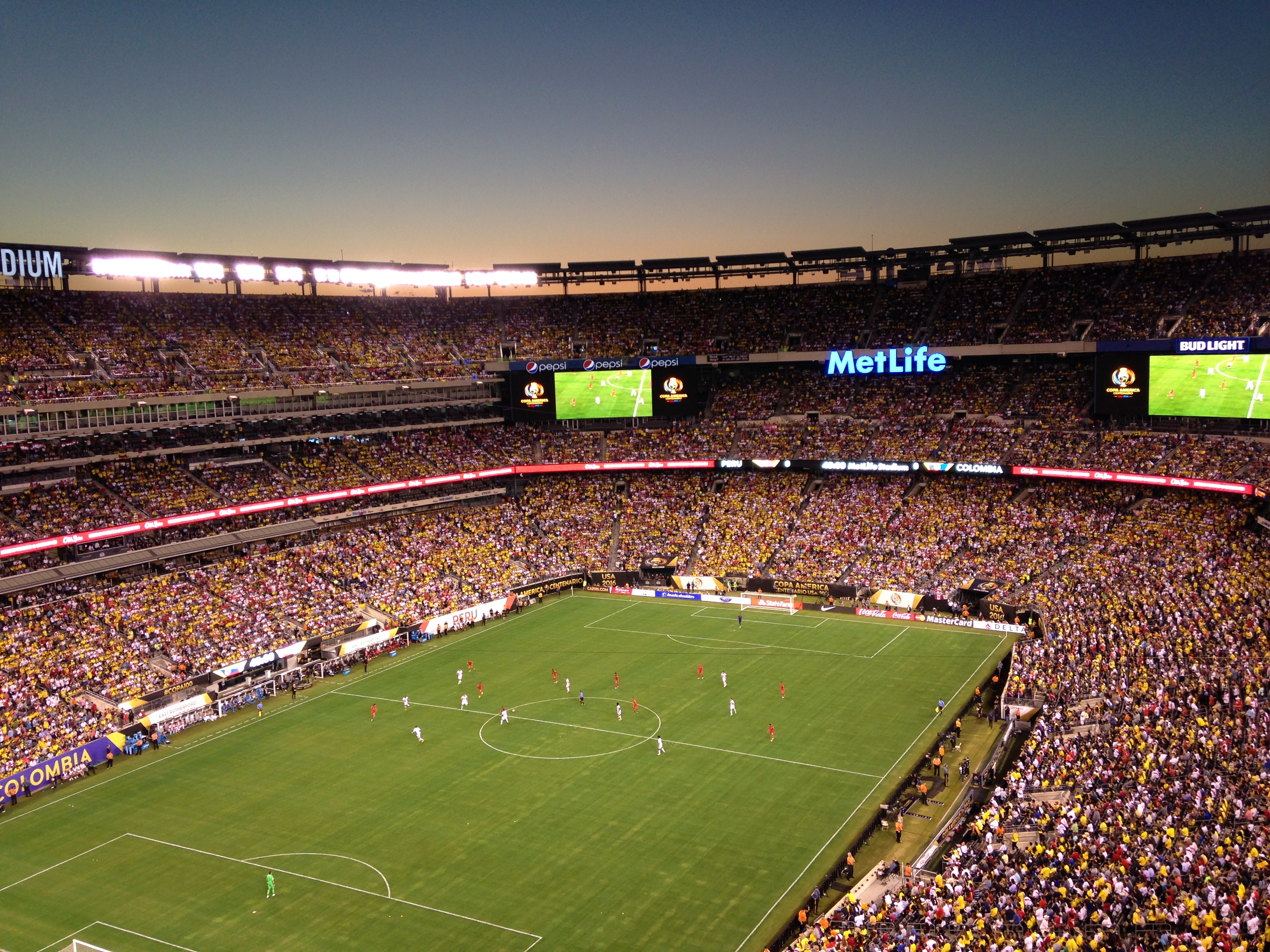
- MetLife Stadium (pictured earlier in the tournament) hosted the final.
- Event: Copa América Centenario
Argentina	Chile
(Argentina)	(Chile)
0	0
- After extra time Chile won 4–2 on penalties
- Date: June 26, 2016
- Venue: MetLife Stadium, East Rutherford, New Jersey, U.S.
- Man of the Match: Claudio Bravo (Chile)
- Referee: Héber Lopes (Brazil)
- Attendance: 82,026
- Weather: 77 °F (25 °C), Clear

The Copa América Centenario final was a soccer match that took place on June 26, 2016, to determine the winner of the Copa América Centenario. It was the 45th final of the Copa América, and it took place at MetLife Stadium at the Meadowlands Sports Complex in East Rutherford, New Jersey, outside of New York City.

The match was contested by Argentina and Chile, making it a rematch of the 2015 final. At this tournament, Argentina and Chile soon faced each other in Group D, and the victory belonged to Argentina with a score of 2–1. But in the final, like the last one, Chile ultimately won on penalty kicks after a 0–0 draw, with Chile scoring only their last 4 penalties after going first and 2 Argentines missing. However, Chile won 4-2 this time. Forward Lionel Messi announced his retirement from international soccer after the defeat, having missed Argentina's first penalty in the shootout and suffering his third consecutive final defeat with Argentina, although he later reversed this decision.

== Background ==
This edition of the Copa América was the first hosted by the United States. The match marked the sixth time Argentina reached the final since the tournament was rebranded Copa América in 1975. They also finished in the top two in 22 editions of the tournament's predecessor, the Campeonato Sudamericano, in which winners were decided in a single group stage with no final match. At this time, Argentina's last international tournament win had been the Copa America in 1993. Meanwhile, this was Chile's fourth final appearance, having also finished in the top two in 1955 and 1956. Chile was the defending champions, having won their first international title in the previous year's edition as the host nation. This was Argentina's third major tournament final in a row, after the 2014 FIFA World Cup final and 2015 Copa América final, a feat only done twice before in the history of national teams, by West Germany (1972, 1974, 1976) and Spain (2008, 2010, 2012).

== Route to the final ==
Argentina
Round
Chile
Opponent
Result
Group stage
Opponent
Result
Chile
2–1
Match 1
Argentina
1–2
Panama
5–0
Match 2
Bolivia
2–1
Bolivia
3–0
Match 3
Panama
4–2
Group D winner

Pos	Team	Pld	Pts
1	Argentina	3	9
2	Chile	3	6
3	Panama	3	3
4	Bolivia	3	0

Source: CONMEBOL & CONCACAF
Final standings
Group D runner-up

Pos	Team	Pld	Pts
1	Argentina	3	9
2	Chile	3	6
3	Panama	3	3
4	Bolivia	3	0

Source: CONMEBOL & CONCACAF
Opponent
Result
Knockout stage
Opponent
Result
Venezuela
4–1
Quarter-finals
Mexico
7–0
United States
4–0
Semi-finals
Colombia
2–0

== Closing ceremony ==
Pitbull and Becky G performed the official song of the tournament, "Superstar", immediately following the match and trophy ceremony.

== Match ==
As part of FIFA's approval of rule changes based on IFAB's new regulations, a fourth substitute was allowed in extra time. However, neither team used the fourth substitution after the match went into extra time.

=== Details ===
June 26, 2016
8:00 p.m. EDT

Argentina	0–0 (a.e.t.)	Chile
	Report (CONMEBOL); Report (CONCACAF)
Penalties
Messi (penalty missed); Mascherano (penalty scored); Agüero (penalty scored); Biglia (penalty missed)	2–4	(penalty missed) Vidal; (penalty scored) Castillo; (penalty scored) Aránguiz; (penalty scored) Beausejour; (penalty scored) Silva

MetLife Stadium, East Rutherford, New Jersey
Attendance: 82,026
Referee: Héber Lopes (Brazil)

Argentina	Chile

GK	1	Sergio Romero
RB	4	Gabriel Mercado
CB	17	Nicolás Otamendi
CB	13	Ramiro Funes Mori
LB	16	Marcos Rojo	(red card) 43'
DM	6	Lucas Biglia
DM	14	Javier Mascherano	(yellow card) 37'
CM	19	Éver Banega		(substituted off) 111'
RW	10	Lionel Messi (c)	(yellow card) 40'
LW	7	Ángel Di María		(substituted off) 57'
CF	9	Gonzalo Higuaín		(substituted off) 70'
Substitutions:
MF	5	Matías Kranevitter	(yellow card) 94'	(substituted on) 57'
MF	18	Erik Lamela		(substituted on) 111'
FW	11	Sergio Agüero		(substituted on) 70'
Manager:
Gerardo Martino

GK	1	Claudio Bravo (c)
RB	4	Mauricio Isla
CB	18	Gonzalo Jara
CB	17	Gary Medel
LB	15	Jean Beausejour	(yellow card) 52'
DM	21	Marcelo Díaz	(yellow card) 16' (yellow-red card) 28'
CM	8	Arturo Vidal	(yellow card) 37'
CM	20	Charles Aránguiz	(yellow card) 69'
RW	6	José Pedro Fuenzalida		(substituted off) 80'
LW	7	Alexis Sánchez		(substituted off) 104'
CF	11	Eduardo Vargas		(substituted off) 109'
Substitutions:
MF	5	Francisco Silva		(substituted on) 104'
FW	16	Nicolás Castillo		(substituted on) 109'
FW	22	Edson Puch		(substituted on) 80'
Manager:
(Argentina) Juan Antonio Pizzi

Man of the Match:
Claudio Bravo (Chile)

Assistant referees:
Kléber Lúcio Gil (Brazil)
Bruno Boschilia (Brazil)
Fourth official:
Roberto García (Mexico)
Fifth official:
José Luis Camargo (Mexico)

Match rules

- 90 minutes.
- 30 minutes of extra time if necessary.
- Penalty shoot-out if scores still level.
- Maximum of three substitutions, with a fourth allowed in extra time.

=== Statistics ===
Statistic	Argentina	Chile
Goals scored	0	0
Total shots	18	4
Shots on target	3	2
Saves	2	3
Ball possession	46%	54%
Corner kicks	9	4
Fouls committed	14	22
Offsides	0	5
Yellow cards	5	3
Red cards	1	1

== Post-match ==
Chile won their second consecutive final and defended the Copa América after their win in 2015, while Argentina lost their third consecutive final (preceded by the 2014 World Cup and 2015 Copa América). The match had an attendance of 82,026, the largest in the history of New Jersey.

Lionel Messi announced his retirement from international soccer after the match, saying "I've done all I can. It hurts not to be a champion." Argentine newspaper La Nación speculated that other players, including Sergio Agüero, Javier Mascherano and Gonzalo Higuaín were set to retire. ESPN Deportes reported that Ángel Di María, Lucas Biglia, Ezequiel Lavezzi and Éver Banega could potentially retire as well. On August 12, 2016, Messi reverted his decision and announced his comeback to international soccer, saying "There were too many things in my head during the day of the last final and I seriously thought about letting it go, but I love my country and this jersey so much." Three of the aforementioned players (Agüero, Di María and Messi) would eventually win their first international title at the Copa América five years later. They would also go on to win the 2022 World Cup, with Messi and Di Maria scoring in the final.
