= 2011 Oriente Petrolero season =

Oriente Petrolero
2011 season
- Chairman: (Bolivia) Miguel Ángel Antelo
- Manager: TBA

The 2011 season is Oriente Petrolero's 55th competitive season, 35th consecutive season in the Liga de Fútbol Profesional Boliviano, and 56th year in existence as a football club. To see more news about Oriente go to Oriente Petrolero Site Official. This season will only show the Torneo Adecuacion and Copa Libertadores participation.

== Season summary ==
To be written at the end of the season

== Key dates ==
- 19.12.2010: Cuffaro Russo is appointed as the new Oriente manager following the departure of first team coach Gustavo Quinteros with his tenure set to commence on 26 December.
- 23.12.2010:Lorgio Suarez is allowed to leave Oriente on compassionate grounds. He joins Oriente rivals club Blooming for an undisclosed fee, linking up with former Oriente teammate Sergio Galarza and Wilder Zabala.
- 26.12.2010: La Liga fixtures for the 2011 season are announced. Oriente are to open their defence of the La Liga crown at home to La Paz F.C.
- 29.12.2010: Schiapparelli signed new deal and stays for 18 month
- 18.01.2011: Oriente begin El Torneo Adecuacion season with a resounding 6-0 win over newly change La Paz F.C.
- 26.01.2011: Oriente sign 21-year-old striker Nicolas "Chapa" Fernandez from Argentine club Rosario Central. He will replace former Oriente striker Danilo Peinado who left the club 3 days ago
- 04.02.2011: Oriente draw Junior, Peru León de Huánuco and Grêmio in the group stages of Copa Libertadores.

== Squads ==
=== First team squad ===
The squad will be announced on February 1st

No.	Name	Nationality	Position (s)	Date of birth (age)	Signed from
Goalkeepers
1	Hugo Suarez	(Bolivia)	GK	February 7, 1982 (age 44)	(Bolivia) Jorge Wilstermann
	Michael Etulain	(Uruguay)	GK	October 31, 1980 (age 46)	(Uruguay) Miramar Misiones
	Óscar Antelo	(Bolivia)	GK	June 18, 1979 (age 47)	(Bolivia) Oriente B
Defenders
5	Alejandro Schiapparelli	(Argentina)	CB / RB	May 16, 1980 (age 46)	(Bolivia) Bolivar
	Gustavo Caamaño	(Argentina)	LWB	May 27, 1979 (age 47)	(Argentina) Aldosivi
	Francisco Argüello	(Paraguay)	RWB	June 4, 1980 (age 46)	(Bolivia) Real Mamoré
	Alejandro Meleán	(Bolivia)	RB / LB		(Bolivia) La Paz F.C.
	Ronald Rea	(Bolivia)	CB	March 29, 1988 (age 38)	(Bolivia) Oriente B
	Luis Alberto Gutierrez (C)	(Bolivia)	CB	January 15, 1985 (age 41)	(Israel) Ironi Kiryat Shmona
	Diego Terrazas	(Bolivia)	LB / CB	February 27, 1987 (age 39)	(Bolivia) Oriente B
	Gabriel Aguilar	(Bolivia)	CB / RB	March 15, 1987 (age 39)	(Bolivia) San Jose
Midfielders
	Marcelo Aguirre	(Argentina)	CM / DM / RM	August 25, 1983 (age 43)	(Argentina) Rosario Central
	Fernando Saucedo	(Bolivia)	CM / DM / RM	March 15, 1990 (age 36)	(Bolivia) Oriente B
	Jhasmani Campos	(Bolivia)	CM / AM	May 10, 1998 (age 28)	(Bolivia) Tahuichi Academy
	Walter Veizaga	(Bolivia)	AM / RM / LM	April 22, 1986 (age 40)	(Bolivia) Jorge Wilstermann
	Joselito Vaca	(Bolivia)	DM	August 12, 1982 (age 44)	(Bolivia) Blooming
Forwards
	Nicolás Fernández	(Argentina)	CF		(Argentina) Rosario Central
	Pedro López	(Bolivia)	ST / LW / RW		(Bolivia) Oriente B
	Juan Carlos Arce	(Bolivia)	ST / RW	April 10, 1985 (age 41)	(Russia) Terek Grozny
	Alcides Peña	(Bolivia)	LW / RW / AM	January 14, 1985 (age 41)	(Bolivia) Tahuichi Academy

=== Torneo Adecuacion squad ===
Note: Flags indicate national team as defined under FIFA eligibility rules; some limited exceptions apply. Players may hold more than one non-FIFA nationality.

No.	Pos.	Nation	Player
1	GK	BOL	Hugo Suarez
2	DF	BOL	Miguel Hoyos
4	MF	PAR	Francisco Argüello
5	DF	ARG	Alejandro Schiapparelli
6	DF	ARG	Gustavo Martin Caamaño
7	MF	ARG	Marcelo Aguirre
9	FW	ARG	Nicolás Fernández
10	MF	BOL	Jhasmani Campos
11	FW	BOL	Alcides Peña
—	FW	BOL	Pedro López
—	MF	BOL	Pedro Cañellas

No.	Pos.	Nation	Player
13	MF	BOL	Diego Terrazas
14	DF	BOL	Gabriel Aguilar
15	DF	BOL	Ronald Rea
16	GK	URU	Michael Etulain
17	FW	BOL	Juan Carlos Arce
18	FW	BOL	Mauricio Saucedo
21	MF	BOL	Joselito Vaca
23	DF	BOL	Luis Alberto Gutierrez
26	MF	BOL	Fernando Saucedo
—	DF	BOL	Alejandro Melean
—	MF	BOL	Rover Heguigorric

=== Copa Libertadores squad ===
Note: Flags indicate national team as defined under FIFA eligibility rules; some limited exceptions apply. Players may hold more than one non-FIFA nationality.

No.	Pos.	Nation	Player
1	GK	BOL	Hugo Suarez
2	DF	BOL	Miguel Hoyos
3	DF	BOL	Alejandro Meleán
5	DF	ARG	Alejandro Schiapparelli
6	DF	ARG	Gustavo Martin Caamaño
7	MF	ARG	Marcelo Aguirre
8	MF	BOL	Fernando Saucedo
9	FW	ARG	Nicolás Fernández
10	MF	BOL	Jhasmani Campos
11	FW	BOL	Alcides Peña
12	GK	BOL	Alex Arancibia
13	MF	BOL	Diego Terrazas

No.	Pos.	Nation	Player
16	MF	BOL	Walter Veizaga
17	FW	BOL	Juan Carlos Arce
18	FW	BOL	Mauricio Saucedo
20	DF	BOL	Gabriel Aguilar
21	MF	BOL	Joselito Vaca
23	DF	BOL	Luis Alberto Gutierrez

== Transfers ==
=== In ===
==== Summer ====
Squad #	Position	Player	Transferred from	Fee	Date	Source
	GK	(Uruguay) Michael Etulain	(Uruguay) Miramar	Unknown		
	MF	(Argentina) Marcelo Aguirre	(Argentina) Rosario Central	Unknown	9 January 2011	
7	FW	(Bolivia) Juan Carlos Arce	(Russia) FC Terek Grozny		25 August 2010	
	FW	(Argentina) Nicolás Fernández	(Argentina) Rosario Central		21 January 2011	
	DF	(Bolivia) Alejandro Meleán	(Bolivia) La Paz F.C.		20 August 2010	
	GK	(Bolivia) Walter Veizaga	(Bolivia) Jorge Wilstersmann	£2.7 million	20 August 2010	

==== Summer ====
Squad #	Position	Player	Transferred to	Fee	Date	Source
10	MF	(Uruguay) Danilo Peinado		Free	30 June 2010	
13	FW	(Uruguay) Jorge Ramírez	(Honduras) C.D. España	Free	30 June 2010	

=== Loan out ===
Squad #	Position	Player	Loaned to	Start	End	Source
30	DF	(Bolivia) Lorgio Suarez	(Bolivia) Blooming	7 July 2010	8 September 2010	
	DF	(Bolivia) Nicolás Suárez Vaca	(Bolivia) San José	7 July 2010	1 July 2011	
48	MF	(Bolivia) Andrés Jiménez	(Bolivia) Guabirá	2 August 2010	29 August 2010	

== Pre-season ==
10 January 2011
09:00 am

Oriente Petrolero (Bolivia)	3 – 1	(Bolivia) Destroyers
Joselito Vaca 17'; Alcides Peña 50'; Fernando Saucedo 70'	(Report)	Roberto Riaza 25'

Estadio Tahuichi Aguilera, Santa Cruz
Attendance: 5,000

10 January 2011
15:00

Oriente Petrolero (Bolivia)	1 – 1	(Bolivia) Real America
Ronald Rea 66'		Gróver Cuéllar 24'

Deportivo San Antonio, Santa Cruz de la Sierra
Attendance: 1,000

=== Top scorers ===
Includes all competitive matches. The list is sorted by shirt number when total goals are equal.

Last updated on 24 January

Position	Nation	Number	Name	Adecuacion	Copa Libertadores	Total
1	(Bolivia)	18	Mauricio Saucedo	6	0	6
2	(Bolivia)	10	Jhasmani Campos	2	0	2
2	(Bolivia)	2	Miguel Hoyos	2	0	2
3	(Bolivia)	11	Alcides Peña	2	0	2
3	(Bolivia)	21	Joselito Vaca	1	0	1
3	(Bolivia)	8	Fernando Saucedo	1	0	1
3	(Bolivia)		Luis Alberto Gutierrez	1	0	1
	(Argentina)		Alejandro Schiapparelli	1	0	1
	(Argentina)		Nicolás Fernández	1	0	1
3	(Argentina)		Marcelo Aguirre	1	0	1
			TOTALS	18	0	18

=== Disciplinary record ===
Includes all competitive matches. Players with 1 card or more included only.

Last updated on 23 February 2011

Position	Nation	Number	Name	Torneo Adecuacion		Copa Libertadores		Total (Adecuacion Total)	
Position	Nation	Number	Name	Yellow card	Red card	Yellow card	Red card	Yellow card	Red card
MF	(Bolivia)	10	Jhasmani Campos	4	0	0	0	4 (4)	0 (0)
DF	(Bolivia)	14	Gabriel Aguilar	1	0	0	0	1 (1)	0 (0)
	(Bolivia)		Joselito Vaca	1	0	0	0	1 (1)	0 (0)
	(Argentina)		Gustavo Caamaño	0	0	1	0	1 (1)	0 (0)
	(Bolivia)		Juan Carlos Arce	1	0	0	0	1 (1)	0 (0)
	(Bolivia)		Mauricio Saucedo	0	0	1	0	1 (1)	0 (0)
	(Bolivia)	14	Miguel Hoyos	1	0	0	0	1 (1)	0 (0)
	(Bolivia)		Diego Terrazas	1	0	0	0	1 (1)	0 (0)
DF	(Argentina)	5	Alejandro Schiapparelli	1	0	0	0	1 (1)	0 (0)
MF	(Bolivia)	26	Fernando Saucedo	1	0	0	0	1 (1)	0 (0)
			TOTALS	11	0	0	0	13 (13)	0 (0)

== Torneo Adecuacion ==
=== Standings ===
Pos	Team	Pld	W	D	L	GF	GA	GD	Pts	Qualification
1	Bolívar	22	11	7	4	32	24	+8	40	2012 Copa Libertadores Second Stage
2	Real Potosí	22	11	5	6	32	22	+10	38	2012 Copa Libertadores First Stage
3	Oriente Petrolero	22	11	3	8	46	25	+21	36	2012 Copa Sudamericana First Stage
4	The Strongest	22	10	5	7	33	26	+7	35	
5	Blooming	22	11	2	9	34	28	+6	35	

Rules for classification: 1st points; 2nd goal difference; 3rd number of goals scored.

=== Results summary ===
Overall								Home						Away					
Pld	W	D	L	GF	GA	GD	Pts	W	D	L	GF	GA	GD	W	D	L	GF	GA	GD
6	5	0	1	18	6	+12	15	3	0	0	11	3	+8	2	0	1	7	3	+4

Last updated: 1 February 2011.
Source: Torneo Adecuacion

=== Results by round ===
Round	1	2	3	4	5	6	7	8	9	10	11	12	13	14	15	16	17	18	19	20	21	22
Ground	H	A	H	A	H	A	A	H	A	A	H	A	H	A	H	A	H	A	H	A	H	H
Result	W	W	W	W	W	L	L	W	W	W	D	L	D	L	L	L	W	L	W	D	L	W
Position	1	1	1	1	1	1																3

Updated to match(es) played on 13 April. Source: Matches
A = Away; H = Home; W = Win; D = Draw; L = Loss
18 January 2011
20:30

Oriente Petrolero	6 – 0	La Paz F.C.
Miguel Hoyos 13'; Joselito Vaca 17'; Gabriel Aguilar (yellow card) 34'; Fernando Saucedo 57'; Jhasmani Campos (yellow card) 52' (goal) 74'; Alcides Peña 84'; Luis Alberto Gutierrez 90'	(Report)	Enrique Romaña (yellow card) 51' (red card)

Estadio Tahuichi Aguilera, Santa Cruz de la Sierra
Attendance: 9,505
Referee: Gary Vargas

23 January 2011
16:00

Real Potosi	0 – 3	Oriente Petrolero
Diego Salvatierra (yellow card) 48'	(Report)	Jhasmani Campos 17'; Mauricio Saucedo 33', 36'

Estadio Victor Agustín Ugarte, Potosi
Referee: Luis Irusta

30 January 2011
18:00

Oriente Petrolero	3 – 2	The Strongest
Mauricio Saucedo 35', 45'; Jhasmani Campos (yellow card) 36'; Alejandro Schiapparelli (yellow card) 70'; Fernando Saucedo (yellow card) 71'; Miguel Hoyos 78'	(Report)	Cristian Ruíz 9'; Nelvin Soliz (yellow card) 42'; Luis Méndez (yellow card) 43'; Regis de Souza 74'

Estadio Tahuichi Aguilera, Santa Cruz de la Sierra
Attendance: 20,000
Referee: Jordan Jose

6 February 2011
18:00

Blooming	0 – 2	Oriente Petrolero
Alejandro Gómez (yellow card) 26'; José Luis Chávez (yellow card) 44'	(Report)	Mauricio Saucedo 24'; Joselito Vaca (yellow card) 39'; Juan Carlos Arce (yellow card) 44'; Jhasmani Campos (yellow card) 60'; Marcelo Aguirre 84'

Estadio Tahuichi Aguilera, Santa Cruz de la Sierra
Attendance: 37,000
Referee: Alejandro Mancilla

13 February 2011
18:00

Oriente Petrolero	2 – 1	San José
Jhasmani Campos (yellow card) 28'; Diego Terrazas (yellow card) 28'; Alejandro Schiapparelli 32'; Miguel Hoyos (yellow card) 46'; Nicolás Fernández 87'	(Report)	Luiz Carlos Vieira (yellow card) 38' (goal) 45'; Sergio Jáuregui (yellow card) 23'; Limbert Pizarro (yellow card) 23'; Fabricio Brandao (yellow card) 58'; Alejandro Bejarano (yellow card) 67'; Carlos Lampe (yellow card) 68'

Estadio Tahuichi Aguilera, Santa Cruz de la Sierra
Attendance: 20,000
Referee: Peter Guerrero

20 February 2011
16:00

Aurora	3 – 2	Oriente Petrolero
Diego Cabrera 21'; Augusto Andaveris 25' 39'; Ronald Rodríguez (yellow card) 52'; Fernando Sanjurjo (yellow card) 64'; Edward Zenteno (yellow card) 85'	(Report)	Alcides Peña 14'; Jhasmani Campos (red card) 40'; Gustavo Caamaño (yellow card) 45'; Joselito Vaca (yellow card) 45'; Miguel Hoyos (yellow card) 70'; Mauricio Saucedo 86' (pen.); Alejandro Meleán (yellow card) 88'

Estadio Félix Capriles, Cochabamba
Attendance: 6,826
Referee: Alejandro Mancilla

27 February 2011
16:00

Nacional Potosí	2 – 1	Oriente Petrolero
Bryan Aldave 8', 26'; Bernardo Leyenda (yellow card) 45'; Ronald Puma (yellow card) 45'; Didí Torrico (yellow card) 74'; Jose Rios (yellow card) 84'	(Report)	Alcides Peña 62'; Alejandro Meleán (yellow card) 90'

Estadio Víctor Agustín Ugarte
Attendance: 3,439
Referee: Raúl Orosco

13 March 2011
16:00

Oriente Petrolero	6 – 0	Bolivar
Mauricio Saucedo 15', 24', 33', 52'; Marcelo Aguirre (yellow card) 27'; Juan Carlos Arce (yellow card) 37'; Joselito Vaca 54'; Alcides Peña 61'; Jhasmani Campos (yellow card) 70'; Gustavo Caamaño (yellow card) 76'	(Report)	Ronald Garcia (red card) 20'; Wálter Flores (yellow card) 37'; Edemir Rodríguez (yellow card) 48'; Pablo Frontini (yellow card) 77'

Estadio Ramón Tahuichi Aguilera
Attendance: 9,642
Referee: Alejandro Mancilla

20 March 2011
16:00

Guabirá	0 – 1	Oriente Petrolero
Ricardo Bejarano Vargas (yellow card) 43'; Darwin Rios (yellow card) 72'; Cristhian Michael Coimbra Arias (yellow card) 75'; Andrés Jiménez (yellow card) 84'	(Report)	Yasmani Duk (yellow card) 36'; Alcides Peña 46'; Mauricio Saucedo (yellow card) 60'; Joselito Vaca (yellow card) 89'

Estadio Gilberto Parada
Attendance: 8,670
Referee: Gery Vargas

3 April 2011
16:00

Real Mamoré	2 – 5	Oriente Petrolero
Profirio Díaz (yellow card) 32'; Frank Oni (yellow card) 45'; Juan Maraude 61', 79'	(Report)	Juan Carlos Arce 27'; Mauricio Saucedo (yellow card) 29'; Jhasmani Campos 38'; Miguel Hoyos (yellow card) 60'; Alcides Peña 62'; Michael Etulain (yellow card) 81'; Joselito Vaca 82'; Mauricio Saucedo 90'

Estadio Gran Mamoré
Attendance: 6,079
Referee: Oscar Maldonado

7 April 2011
16:00

Oriente Petrolero	0 – 0	Club Universitario
	(Report)	Roberto Galindo (yellow card) 72'; Jorge Ruth (yellow card) 90'; Ángel Martín Aguirre Schmidt (yellow card) 90'

Estadio Ramón Tahuichi Aguilera
Attendance: 6,613
Referee: Peter Guerrero

10 April 2011
16:00

La Paz F.C.	2 – 1	Oriente Petrolero
Richard Rojas 19', 27'; Jose Paz (yellow card) 33'; Ronald Arana (yellow card) 39'; Daniel Mancilla (yellow card) 64'; Jorge Daniel Florentín (yellow card) 76'; Rodrigo Borda (yellow card) 83'	(Report)	Miguel Hoyos (yellow card) 30'; Alejandro Meleán (yellow card) 48'; Luis Alberto Gutierrez (red card) 64'; Alejandro Schiapparelli 71' (yellow card) 74'; Juan Carlos Arce (red card) 79'

Estadio Hernando Siles
Attendance: 2,054
Referee: Oscar Maldonado

17 April 2011
16:00

Oriente Petrolero	2 – 2	Real Potosi
Alejandro Schiapparelli (yellow card) 45'; Jhasmani Campos (yellow card) 45'; Alcides Peña (yellow card) 50'; Gustavo Caamaño 64'; Joselito Vaca 66' (yellow card) 69'; Fernando Saucedo (red card) 78'	(Report)	Gerardo Yecerotte (yellow card) 16'; Victor Angola 23' (yellow card) 68'; Mario Ovando (yellow card) 45'; Miguel Loaiza (yellow card) 65'; Sebastián Carrizo (yellow card) 67'; Luis Torrico 90'

Estadio Ramón Tahuichi Aguilera
Attendance: 5,715
Referee: Jose Jaime Jordan Gallardo

21 April 2011
16:00

The Strongest	1 – 0	Oriente Petrolero
Christian Ruiz 59'; Leonel Reyes (yellow card) 74'; Luis Melgar (yellow card) 74'; Federico García (yellow card) 84'	(Report)	Alejandro Schiapparelli (yellow card) 41'; Nicolás Fernández (yellow card) 43'

Estadio Hernando Siles
Attendance: 8,379
Referee: Alejandro Mancilla

24 April 2011
16:00

Oriente Petrolero	1 – 2	Blooming
Mauricio Saucedo 6'; Joselito Vaca (yellow card) 29'; Gustavo Caamaño (yellow card) 40'; Alcides Peña (yellow card) 53'; Miguel Hoyos (yellow card) 84'	(Report)	José Luis Chávez (yellow card) 12' (yellow-red card) 90'; Diego Valdés (yellow card) 31' (yellow-red card) 86'; Oscar Diaz 33' (yellow card) 34'; Sergio Galarza (yellow card) 43'; Hernán Boyero 45'; Jesús Alejandro Gómez (yellow card) 45' (red card) 66'; Carlos Alberto Ortiz (yellow card) 53'; Ricardo Verduguez (yellow card) 61'

Estadio Ramón Tahuichi Aguilera
Attendance: 31,633
Referee: Oscar Maldonado

1 May 2011
16:00

San José	1 – 0	Oriente Petrolero
Fabricio Brandao (yellow card) 30'; Nicolas Suazez (yellow card) 45'; Limberg Pizarro (yellow card) 45'; Joaquín Botero 73' (pen.)	(Report)	Luis Alberto Gutierrez (yellow card) 41'; Miguel Hoyos (red card) 77'; Juan Carlos Arce (yellow card) 90'; Nicolás Fernández (yellow card) 90'

Estadio Félix Capriles
Attendance: 12,122
Referee: Raúl Orosco

8 May 2011
16:00

Oriente Petrolero	2 – 0	Aurora
Gustavo Caamaño 20'; Diego Terrazas (yellow card) 29'; Juan Carlos Arce (yellow card) 47'; Joselito Vaca 88'; Michael Etulain (yellow card) 90'	(Report)	Ronald Rodriguez (yellow card) 15'; Edward Zenteno (red card) 31'; Aquilino Villalba (yellow card) 31'; Edson Zenteno (yellow card) 74'; Jaime Cardozo (yellow card) 77'

Estadio Ramón Tahuichi Aguilera, Santa Cruz
Attendance: 5,248
Referee: Alejandro Mancilla

12 May 2011
16:00

Club Universitario	1 – 0	Oriente Petrolero
Marvin Bejarano (yellow card) 73' (goal) 86'; Luis Liendo (yellow card) 81'	(Report)	Diego Terrazas (yellow card) 16'; Luis Alberto Gutierrez (yellow card) 45'; Cristian Cuffaro Russo (yellow card) 60'; Gustavo Caamaño (yellow card) 72'

Estadio Olímpico Patria
Attendance: 2,933
Referee: Gery Vargas

15 May 2011
16:00

Oriente Petrolero	3 – 1	Nacional Potosí
Luis Alberto Gutierrez (yellow card) 55'; Juan Carlos Arce 59', 74'; Marcelo Aguirre 83'	(Report)	Ronald Puma (yellow card) 15'; Marcelo Escalante (yellow card) 42'; Santos Amador 53' (yellow card) 56'; José Ríos (yellow card) 65'; Joe Escobar (yellow card) 68'

Estadio Ramón Tahuichi Aguilera, Santa Cruz
Attendance: 4,165
Referee: Alejandro Mancilla

20 May 2011
16:00

Bolívar	1 – 1	Oriente Petrolero
Damián Lizio 69'; Ronald Rivero (yellow card) 72'; Wálter Flores (red card) 72'	(Report)	Diego Terrazas (yellow card) 27'; Walter Veizaga (yellow card) 43'; Alcides Peña 50' (yellow card) 75'; Michael Etulain (yellow card) 52'; Juan Carlos Arce (red card) 72'

Estadio Hernando Siles
Attendance: 22,590
Referee: Jose Jordan

24 May 2011
16:00

Oriente Petrolero	2 – 3	Guabirá
Alcides Peña 7' (yellow card) 33'; Miguel Hoyos (yellow card) 45'; Cristian Cuffaro Russo 65'; Michael Etulain (red card) 88'	(Report)	Adrian Cuellar (yellow card) 15'; Danner Pachi (yellow card) 16'; Sebastián Pol (yellow card) 30' (goal) 32', 90+1' (pen.); Cristhian Coimbra (yellow card) 42'; Luis Gatty Ribeiro (yellow card) 75'; Oscar Araúz 83'

Estadio Ramón Tahuichi Aguilera
Attendance: 7,646
Referee: Hostin Prado

29 May 2011
16:00

Oriente Petrolero	3 – 1	Real Mamoré
Cristian Cuffaro Russo (yellow card) 12'; Luis Alberto Gutierrez 38'; Alcides Peña 48'; Jhasmani Campos 56'; Hugo Suárez (yellow card) 75'	(Report)	Iván Zerda 45' (yellow card) 60'

Estadio Ramón Tahuichi Aguilera
Attendance: 776
Referee: Evert Cuellar

== Copa Libertadores ==
Oriente looked to improve on their first Copa Libertadores participation since 2006, when they were blasted in the First Stage by Argentine River Plate. By virtue of winning Torneo Clausura, Oriente automatically qualified for the group stage of the tournament. The draw for the group stage was held on 25 November 2010 in Asunción. Oriente was paired with Liga Postobon Campeonato Apertura champions, Junior as well as 2010 Torneo Descentralizado Runners-up, León de Huánuco . Oriente's first match took place on the 17 February against Gremio.

=== Group 2 ===
Pos	Team	Pld	W	D	L	GF	GA	GD	Pts
1	(Colombia) Junior	6	4	1	1	9	7	+2	13
2	(Brazil) Grêmio	6	3	1	2	9	6	+3	10
3	(Bolivia) Oriente Petrolero	6	2	0	4	7	8	−1	6
4	(Peru) León de Huánuco	6	1	2	3	4	8	−4	5

February 17, 2011
19:45 UTC−02:00

Grêmio (Brazil)	3–0	(Bolivia) Oriente Petrolero
Carlos Alberto (yellow card) 24'; Douglas 43' (pen.), 70'; Gilson 48'	Report	Mauricio Saucedo (yellow card) 18'; Gustavo Caamaño (yellow card) 42'

Estádio Olímpico Monumental, Porto Alegre
Attendance: 42,000
Referee: Líber Prudente (Uruguay)

February 23, 2011
15:15 UTC−05:00

León de Huánuco (Peru)	1-0	(Bolivia) Oriente Petrolero
Carlos Zegarra 35'; Jean Ferrari (yellow card) 54'; Jair Céspedes (yellow card) 72'	Report	Joselito Vaca (yellow card) 40'; Luis Alberto Gutierrez (red card) 90+4'

Estadio Heraclio Tapia, Huánuco
Referee: Marlon Escalante

March 8, 2011
20:30 UTC−04:00

Oriente Petrolero (Bolivia)	1-2	(Colombia) Junior
Gustavo Caamaño (yellow card) 17'; Marcelo Aguirre (yellow card) 36'; Alejandro Meleán (yellow card) 72'; Juan Carlos Arce 90+2'	Report	Harold Macías (yellow card) 18'; Víctor Cortés 27'; Jossymar Gómez (yellow card) 34'; Luis Alfonso Páez 46'

Estadio Ramón Tahuichi Aguilera, Santa Cruz
Referee: Gabriel Favale

March 17, 2011
21:30 UTC−05:00

Junior (Colombia)	2-1	(Bolivia) Oriente Petrolero
Anselmo de Almeida (yellow card) 22'; Carlos Bacca 65', 72' (pen.); Juan David Valencia (yellow card) 90+1'	Report	Alejandro Schiapparelli (yellow card) 32'; Jhasmani Campos 48' (yellow card) 74'; Marcelo Aguirre (yellow card) 55' (yellow-red card) 57'

Estadio Metropolitano Roberto Meléndez, Barranquilla
Referee: Juan Soto

March 24, 2011
18:30 UTC−04:00

Oriente Petrolero (Bolivia)	2-0	(Peru) León de Huánuco
Alcides Peña 17'; Jhasmani Campos (yellow card) 69' (goal) 78'; Juan Carlos Arce (yellow card) 89'	Report	Gianfranco Espinoza (yellow card) 49'; Luis Cardozo (yellow card) 89'; Jean Ferrari (yellow card) 90'

Estadio Ramón Tahuichi Aguilera, Santa Cruz
Referee: Alfredo Intriago

April 14, 2011
21:45 UTC−04:00

Oriente Petrolero (Bolivia)	3-0	(Brazil) Grêmio
Nicolás Fernández 51'; Fernando Saucedo 75'; Juan Carlos Arce 80'	Report	Fábio Rochemback (yellow card) 60'; Rodolfo Dantas Bispo (red card) 85'

Estadio Ramón Tahuichi Aguilera, Santa Cruz
Referee: Omar Ponce
