= Copa América Centenario squads =

The following is a list of squads for all sixteen national teams that competed at the Copa América Centenario. Each national team had to submit a squad of 23 players, three of whom had to be goalkeepers. The provisional squads were announced on May 4, 2016. A final selection was provided to the organizers on May 20, 2016.

== Group A ==
=== Colombia ===
Head coach: (Argentina) José Pékerman

The following 23 players were called up for the final squad. Óscar Murillo withdrew due to injury and was replaced by Yerry Mina.

No.	Pos.	Player	Date of birth (age)	Caps	Goals	Club
1	GK	David Ospina	August 31, 1988 (aged 27)	64	0	(The Football Association) Arsenal
2	DF	Cristián Zapata	September 30, 1986 (aged 29)	40	0	(Italian Football Federation) Milan
3	DF	Yerry Mina	September 23, 1994 (aged 21)	2	0	(Colombian Football Federation) Santa Fe
4	DF	Santiago Arias	January 13, 1992 (aged 24)	21	0	(Royal Dutch Football Association) PSV Eindhoven
5	MF	Guillermo Celis	May 8, 1993 (aged 23)	1	0	(Colombian Football Federation) Junior
6	MF	Carlos Sánchez	February 6, 1986 (aged 30)	62	0	(The Football Association) Aston Villa
7	FW	Carlos Bacca	September 8, 1986 (aged 29)	27	11	(Italian Football Federation) Milan
8	MF	Edwin Cardona	December 8, 1992 (aged 23)	14	3	(Mexican Football Federation) Monterrey
9	FW	Roger Martínez	June 23, 1994 (aged 21)	0	0	(Argentine Football Association) Racing
10	MF	James Rodríguez (captain)	July 12, 1991 (aged 24)	42	14	(Royal Spanish Football Federation) Real Madrid
11	MF	Juan Guillermo Cuadrado	May 26, 1988 (aged 28)	49	5	(Italian Football Federation) Juventus
12	GK	Róbinson Zapata	September 30, 1978 (aged 37)	3	0	(Colombian Football Federation) Santa Fe
13	MF	Sebastián Pérez	March 29, 1993 (aged 23)	2	1	(Colombian Football Federation) Atlético Nacional
14	DF	Felipe Aguilar	January 20, 1993 (aged 23)	0	0	(Colombian Football Federation) Atlético Nacional
15	DF	Stefan Medina	June 14, 1992 (aged 23)	4	0	(Mexican Football Federation) Pachuca
16	MF	Dani Torres	November 15, 1989 (aged 26)	4	0	(Colombian Football Federation) Independiente Medellín
17	FW	Dayro Moreno	September 16, 1985 (aged 30)	27	2	(Mexican Football Federation) Tijuana
18	DF	Frank Fabra	February 22, 1991 (aged 25)	5	0	(Argentine Football Association) Boca Juniors
19	DF	Farid Díaz	July 20, 1983 (aged 32)	2	0	(Colombian Football Federation) Atlético Nacional
20	MF	Andrés Felipe Roa	May 25, 1993 (aged 23)	1	0	(Colombian Football Federation) Deportivo Cali
21	FW	Marlos Moreno	September 20, 1996 (aged 19)	2	0	(Colombian Football Federation) Atlético Nacional
22	DF	Jeison Murillo	May 27, 1992 (aged 24)	16	1	(Italian Football Federation) Inter Milan
23	GK	Cristian Bonilla	June 2, 1993 (aged 23)	0	0	(Colombian Football Federation) Atlético Nacional

=== Costa Rica ===
Head coach: Óscar Ramírez

The following 23 players were called up for the final squad. Goalkeeper Esteban Alvarado was ruled out due to injury on May 20, being replaced by Leonel Moreira. On May 31, Keylor Navas pulled out due to a tendinitis on his left foot and was replaced by Danny Carvajal, and Ariel Rodríguez pulled out due to injury and was replaced by Johnny Woodly.

No.	Pos.	Player	Date of birth (age)	Caps	Goals	Club
1	GK	Danny Carvajal	January 8, 1989 (aged 27)	0	0	(Costa Rican Football Federation) Saprissa
2	DF	Jhonny Acosta	July 21, 1983 (aged 32)	40	2	(Costa Rican Football Federation) Alajuelense
3	DF	Francisco Calvo	July 8, 1992 (aged 23)	11	0	(Costa Rican Football Federation) Saprissa
4	DF	Michael Umaña	July 16, 1982 (aged 33)	92	1	(Football Federation Islamic Republic of Iran) Persepolis
5	MF	Celso Borges	May 27, 1988 (aged 28)	88	20	(Royal Spanish Football Federation) Deportivo La Coruña
6	DF	Óscar Duarte	June 3, 1989 (aged 27)	28	2	(Royal Spanish Football Federation) Espanyol
7	MF	Christian Bolaños	May 30, 1984 (aged 32)	57	2	(Canadian Soccer Association) Vancouver Whitecaps FC
8	DF	Bryan Oviedo	February 18, 1990 (aged 26)	28	1	(The Football Association) Everton
9	FW	Álvaro Saborío	March 22, 1982 (aged 34)	107	35	(United States Soccer Federation) D.C. United
10	FW	Bryan Ruiz (captain)	August 18, 1985 (aged 30)	87	21	(Portuguese Football Federation) Sporting CP
11	MF	Johan Venegas	November 27, 1988 (aged 27)	21	5	(Canadian Soccer Association) Montreal Impact
12	FW	Joel Campbell	June 26, 1992 (aged 23)	58	11	(The Football Association) Arsenal
13	MF	Óscar Granados	October 25, 1985 (aged 30)	14	0	(Costa Rican Football Federation) Herediano
14	MF	Randall Azofeifa	December 30, 1984 (aged 31)	38	1	(Costa Rican Football Federation) Herediano
15	DF	José Salvatierra	October 10, 1989 (aged 26)	26	0	(Costa Rican Football Federation) Alajuelense
16	DF	Cristian Gamboa	October 24, 1989 (aged 26)	47	2	(The Football Association) West Bromwich Albion
17	MF	Yeltsin Tejeda	March 17, 1992 (aged 24)	34	0	(French Football Federation) Evian
18	GK	Patrick Pemberton	May 24, 1982 (aged 34)	27	0	(Costa Rican Football Federation) Alajuelense
19	DF	Kendall Waston	January 1, 1988 (aged 28)	7	1	(Canadian Soccer Association) Vancouver Whitecaps FC
20	FW	Johnny Woodly	July 27, 1980 (aged 35)	0	0	(Costa Rican Football Federation) Carmelita
21	FW	Marco Ureña	March 5, 1990 (aged 26)	40	10	(Danish Football Association) Midtjylland
22	DF	Rónald Matarrita	July 9, 1994 (aged 21)	8	0	(United States Soccer Federation) New York City FC
23	GK	Leonel Moreira	April 4, 1990 (aged 26)	5	0	(Costa Rican Football Federation) Herediano

=== Paraguay ===
Head coach: (Argentina) Ramón Díaz

The following players were named for the final squad. Forward Roque Santa Cruz was in the initial squad but withdrew injured and was replaced by Antonio Sanabria. Pablo Aguilar and Néstor Ortigoza also pulled out due to injury and were replaced by Víctor Ayala and Iván Piris respectively.

No.	Pos.	Player	Date of birth (age)	Caps	Goals	Club
1	GK	Justo Villar (captain)	June 30, 1977 (aged 38)	114	0	(Football Federation of Chile) Colo-Colo
2	DF	Fabián Balbuena	August 23, 1991 (aged 24)	3	0	(Brazilian Football Confederation) Corinthians
3	DF	Gustavo Gómez	May 6, 1993 (aged 23)	13	2	(Argentine Football Association) Lanús
4	DF	Iván Piris	March 10, 1989 (aged 27)	24	0	(Italian Football Federation) Udinese
5	DF	Bruno Valdez	October 6, 1992 (aged 23)	10	0	(Paraguayan Football Association) Cerro Porteño
6	DF	Miguel Samudio	August 24, 1986 (aged 29)	33	1	(Mexican Football Federation) América
7	FW	Jorge Benítez	September 2, 1992 (aged 23)	5	1	(Mexican Football Federation) Cruz Azul
8	MF	Rodrigo Rojas	April 9, 1988 (aged 28)	6	0	(Paraguayan Football Association) Cerro Porteño
9	FW	Antonio Sanabria	March 4, 1996 (aged 20)	5	0	(Royal Spanish Football Federation) Sporting Gijón
10	FW	Derlis González	March 23, 1994 (aged 22)	20	3	(Ukrainian Association of Football) Dynamo Kyiv
11	FW	Édgar Benítez	November 8, 1987 (aged 28)	52	8	(Mexican Football Federation) Querétaro
12	GK	Antony Silva	February 27, 1984 (aged 32)	14	0	(Paraguayan Football Association) Cerro Porteño
13	MF	Blas Riveros	April 16, 1998 (aged 18)	0	0	(Paraguayan Football Association) Olimpia
14	DF	Paulo da Silva	February 1, 1980 (aged 36)	133	2	(Mexican Football Federation) Toluca
15	FW	Juan Iturbe	June 4, 1993 (aged 22)	1	0	(The Football Association) Bournemouth
16	MF	Celso Ortiz	January 26, 1989 (aged 27)	8	0	(Royal Dutch Football Association) AZ
17	FW	Miguel Almirón	November 13, 1993 (aged 22)	1	0	(Argentine Football Association) Lanús
18	FW	Nelson Haedo Valdez	November 28, 1983 (aged 32)	74	13	(United States Soccer Federation) Seattle Sounders FC
19	FW	Darío Lezcano	June 30, 1990 (aged 25)	5	4	(German Football Association) FC Ingolstadt
20	DF	Víctor Ayala	January 1, 1988 (aged 28)	17	0	(Argentine Football Association) Lanús
21	MF	Óscar Romero	July 4, 1992 (aged 23)	17	1	(Argentine Football Association) Racing
22	GK	Diego Barreto	July 16, 1981 (aged 34)	13	0	(Paraguayan Football Association) Olimpia
23	MF	Robert Piris Da Motta	July 26, 1994 (aged 21)	0	0	(Paraguayan Football Association) Olimpia

=== United States ===
Head coach: (Germany) Jürgen Klinsmann

The final squad was announced on May 21. Timothy Chandler was ruled out due to injury and replaced by Edgar Castillo on May 27.

No.	Pos.	Player	Date of birth (age)	Caps	Goals	Club
1	GK	Brad Guzan	September 9, 1984 (aged 31)	42	0	(The Football Association) Aston Villa
2	DF	DeAndre Yedlin	July 9, 1993 (aged 22)	31	0	(The Football Association) Sunderland
3	DF	Steve Birnbaum	January 23, 1991 (aged 25)	4	1	(United States Soccer Federation) D.C. United
4	MF	Michael Bradley (captain)	July 31, 1987 (aged 28)	113	15	(Canadian Soccer Association) Toronto FC
5	DF	Matt Besler	February 11, 1987 (aged 29)	31	0	(United States Soccer Federation) Sporting Kansas City
6	DF	John Brooks	January 28, 1993 (aged 23)	18	2	(German Football Association) Hertha BSC
7	FW	Bobby Wood	November 15, 1992 (aged 23)	16	4	(German Football Association) Union Berlin
8	FW	Clint Dempsey	March 9, 1983 (aged 33)	122	49	(United States Soccer Federation) Seattle Sounders FC
9	FW	Gyasi Zardes	September 2, 1991 (aged 24)	23	3	(United States Soccer Federation) LA Galaxy
10	MF	Darlington Nagbe	July 19, 1990 (aged 25)	5	0	(United States Soccer Federation) Portland Timbers
11	MF	Alejandro Bedoya	April 29, 1987 (aged 29)	45	2	(French Football Federation) Nantes
12	GK	Tim Howard	March 6, 1979 (aged 37)	107	0	(The Football Association) Everton
13	MF	Jermaine Jones	November 3, 1981 (aged 34)	58	3	(United States Soccer Federation) Colorado Rapids
14	DF	Michael Orozco	February 7, 1986 (aged 30)	22	4	(Mexican Football Federation) Tijuana
15	MF	Kyle Beckerman	April 23, 1982 (aged 34)	52	1	(United States Soccer Federation) Real Salt Lake
16	MF	Perry Kitchen	February 29, 1992 (aged 24)	3	0	(Scottish Football Association) Heart of Midlothian
17	FW	Christian Pulisic	September 18, 1998 (aged 17)	1	0	(German Football Association) Borussia Dortmund
18	FW	Chris Wondolowski	January 28, 1983 (aged 33)	31	10	(United States Soccer Federation) San Jose Earthquakes
19	MF	Graham Zusi	August 18, 1986 (aged 29)	33	4	(United States Soccer Federation) Sporting Kansas City
20	DF	Geoff Cameron	July 11, 1985 (aged 30)	39	4	(The Football Association) Stoke City
21	DF	Edgar Castillo	October 8, 1986 (aged 29)	18	0	(Mexican Football Federation) Monterrey
22	GK	Ethan Horvath	June 9, 1995 (aged 20)	0	0	(Norwegian Football Federation) Molde
23	DF	Fabian Johnson	December 11, 1987 (aged 28)	42	2	(German Football Association) Borussia Mönchengladbach

== Group B ==
=== Brazil ===
Head coach: Dunga

The following players were named to the final squad. Neymar was unable to participate due to an agreement between his club FC Barcelona and the Brazilian Football Confederation, and was replaced by Lucas Lima. Ricardo Oliveira and Douglas Costa were ruled out due to injury and replaced by Jonas and Kaká on May 20 and 26 respectively. Gabriel Jesus, who would later be part of the 2016 Brazil Olympic squad, was considered as a replacement for Douglas Costa but missed selection through the lack of a U.S. visa. Rafinha and Ederson also pulled out on May 31 and were replaced by Lucas Moura and Marcelo Grohe. In turn, Kaká pulled out due to injury on June 1 and was replaced by Ganso. Luiz Gustavo withdrew from the squad on June 2 for personal reasons and was replaced by Walace.

No.	Pos.	Player	Date of birth (age)	Caps	Goals	Club
1	GK	Alisson	October 2, 1992 (aged 23)	5	0	(Brazilian Football Confederation) Internacional
2	DF	Dani Alves	May 6, 1983 (aged 33)	89	7	(Royal Spanish Football Federation) Barcelona
3	DF	Miranda (captain)	September 7, 1984 (aged 31)	29	0	(Italian Football Federation) Inter Milan
4	DF	Gil	June 12, 1987 (aged 28)	6	0	(Chinese Football Association) Shandong Luneng
5	MF	Casemiro	February 23, 1992 (aged 24)	9	0	(Royal Spanish Football Federation) Real Madrid
6	DF	Filipe Luís	August 9, 1985 (aged 30)	23	1	(Royal Spanish Football Federation) Atlético Madrid
7	MF	Ganso	October 12, 1989 (aged 26)	8	0	(Brazilian Football Confederation) São Paulo
8	MF	Elias	May 16, 1985 (aged 31)	31	0	(Brazilian Football Confederation) Corinthians
9	FW	Jonas	April 1, 1984 (aged 32)	9	2	(Portuguese Football Federation) Benfica
10	MF	Lucas Lima	July 9, 1990 (aged 25)	9	1	(Brazilian Football Confederation) Santos
11	FW	Gabriel Barbosa	August 30, 1996 (aged 19)	1	1	(Brazilian Football Confederation) Santos
12	GK	Diego Alves	June 24, 1985 (aged 30)	8	0	(Royal Spanish Football Federation) Valencia
13	DF	Marquinhos	May 14, 1994 (aged 22)	9	0	(French Football Federation) Paris Saint-Germain
14	DF	Rodrigo Caio	August 17, 1993 (aged 22)	1	0	(Brazilian Football Confederation) São Paulo
15	DF	Fabinho	October 23, 1993 (aged 22)	3	0	(French Football Federation) Monaco
16	DF	Douglas Santos	March 22, 1994 (aged 22)	1	0	(Brazilian Football Confederation) Atlético Mineiro
17	MF	Walace	April 4, 1995 (aged 21)	0	0	(Brazilian Football Confederation) Grêmio
18	MF	Renato Augusto	February 8, 1988 (aged 28)	7	2	(Chinese Football Association) Beijing Guoan
19	MF	Willian	August 9, 1988 (aged 27)	34	6	(The Football Association) Chelsea
20	MF	Lucas Moura	August 13, 1992 (aged 23)	33	4	(French Football Federation) Paris Saint-Germain
21	FW	Hulk	July 25, 1986 (aged 29)	46	12	(Russian Football Union) Zenit Saint Petersburg
22	MF	Philippe Coutinho	June 12, 1992 (aged 23)	13	1	(The Football Association) Liverpool
23	GK	Marcelo Grohe	January 13, 1987 (aged 29)	2	0	(Brazilian Football Confederation) Grêmio

=== Ecuador ===
Head coach: (Bolivia) Gustavo Quinteros

The following 23 players were called up for the final squad.

No.	Pos.	Player	Date of birth (age)	Caps	Goals	Club
1	GK	Máximo Banguera	December 16, 1985 (aged 30)	27	0	(Ecuadorian Football Federation) Barcelona SC
2	DF	Arturo Mina	October 8, 1990 (aged 25)	7	0	(Ecuadorian Football Federation) Independiente del Valle
3	DF	Frickson Erazo	May 5, 1988 (aged 28)	57	2	(Brazilian Football Confederation) Atlético Mineiro
4	DF	Juan Carlos Paredes	July 8, 1987 (aged 28)	58	0	(The Football Association) Watford
5	DF	Cristian Ramírez	August 12, 1994 (aged 21)	4	0	(Hungarian Football Federation) Ferencváros
6	MF	Christian Noboa	April 9, 1985 (aged 31)	63	3	(Russian Football Union) Rostov
7	MF	Jefferson Montero	September 1, 1989 (aged 26)	55	10	(The Football Association) Swansea City
8	MF	Fernando Gaibor	November 8, 1991 (aged 24)	4	0	(Ecuadorian Football Federation) Emelec
9	MF	Fidel Martínez	February 15, 1990 (aged 26)	23	7	(Mexican Football Federation) UNAM
10	DF	Walter Ayoví (captain)	August 11, 1979 (aged 36)	111	8	(Mexican Football Federation) Monterrey
11	MF	Michael Arroyo	April 23, 1987 (aged 29)	26	4	(Mexican Football Federation) América
12	GK	Esteban Dreer	November 11, 1981 (aged 34)	1	0	(Ecuadorian Football Federation) Emelec
13	FW	Enner Valencia	November 4, 1989 (aged 26)	24	14	(The Football Association) West Ham United
14	MF	Ángel Mena	January 21, 1988 (aged 28)	6	1	(Ecuadorian Football Federation) Emelec
15	MF	Pedro Larrea	May 21, 1986 (aged 30)	0	0	(Ecuadorian Football Federation) El Nacional
16	MF	Antonio Valencia	August 4, 1985 (aged 30)	80	8	(The Football Association) Manchester United
17	FW	Jaime Ayoví	February 21, 1988 (aged 28)	34	9	(Argentine Football Association) Godoy Cruz
18	MF	Carlos Gruezo	April 19, 1995 (aged 21)	10	0	(United States Soccer Federation) FC Dallas
19	MF	Juan Cazares	April 3, 1992 (aged 24)	12	1	(Brazilian Football Confederation) Atlético Mineiro
20	DF	Robert Arboleda	October 22, 1991 (aged 24)	0	0	(Ecuadorian Football Federation) Universidad Católica
21	DF	Gabriel Achilier	March 23, 1985 (aged 31)	36	0	(Ecuadorian Football Federation) Emelec
22	GK	Alexander Domínguez	June 5, 1987 (aged 28)	36	0	(Ecuadorian Football Federation) LDU Quito
23	FW	Miller Bolaños	June 1, 1990 (aged 26)	12	6	(Brazilian Football Confederation) Grêmio

=== Haiti ===
Head coach: (France) Patrice Neveu

The following 23 players were called up for the final squad.

No.	Pos.	Player	Date of birth (age)	Caps	Goals	Club
1	GK	Johny Placide (captain)	January 21, 1989 (aged 27)	27	0	(French Football Federation) Reims
2	DF	Jean Sony Alcénat	January 23, 1986 (aged 30)	64	7	(Romanian Football Federation) Voluntari
3	DF	Mechack Jérôme	April 21, 1990 (aged 26)	52	2	(United States Soccer Federation) Jacksonville Armada
4	DF	Kim Jaggy	November 14, 1982 (aged 33)	19	1	(Swiss Football Association) Aarau
5	DF	Romain Genevois	October 28, 1987 (aged 28)	4	0	(French Football Federation) Nice
6	DF	Stéphane Lambese	May 10, 1995 (aged 21)	4	0	(French Football Federation) Paris Saint-Germain B
7	FW	Wilde-Donald Guerrier	March 31, 1989 (aged 27)	36	7	(Polish Football Association) Wisła Kraków
8	DF	Réginal Goreux	December 31, 1987 (aged 28)	21	2	(Royal Belgian Football Association) Standard Liège
9	FW	Kervens Belfort	May 16, 1992 (aged 24)	27	11	(Turkish Football Federation) 1461 Trabzon
10	FW	Jeff Louis	August 8, 1992 (aged 23)	26	2	(French Football Federation) Caen
11	MF	Pascal Millien	May 3, 1986 (aged 30)	31	2	(United States Soccer Federation) Jacksonville Armada
12	GK	Steward Ceus	March 26, 1987 (aged 29)	8	0	(United States Soccer Federation) Minnesota United FC
13	MF	Kevin Lafrance	January 13, 1990 (aged 26)	21	2	(Polish Football Association) Chrobry Głogów
14	MF	James Marcelin	June 13, 1986 (aged 29)	29	3	(United States Soccer Federation) Carolina RailHawks
15	MF	Sony Nordé	July 27, 1989 (aged 26)	25	3	(All India Football Federation) Mohun Bagan
16	MF	Jean Alexandre	August 24, 1986 (aged 29)	38	2	(United States Soccer Federation) Fort Lauderdale Strikers
17	MF	Soni Mustivar	February 12, 1990 (aged 26)	11	0	(United States Soccer Federation) Sporting Kansas City
18	DF	Judelin Aveska	October 21, 1987 (aged 28)	46	1	(Argentine Football Association) Atlético Uruguay
19	MF	Max Hilaire	December 6, 1985 (aged 30)	7	0	(French Football Federation) Cholet
20	FW	Duckens Nazon	April 17, 1994 (aged 22)	13	4	(French Football Federation) Laval
21	FW	Jean-Eudes Maurice	June 21, 1986 (aged 29)	30	10	(Vietnam Football Federation) Saigon
22	DF	Alex Junior Christian	December 5, 1993 (aged 22)	5	0	(Portuguese Football Federation) Vila Real
23	GK	Luis Valendi Odelus	December 1, 1994 (aged 21)	0	0	(Haitian Football Federation) Aigle Noir

=== Peru ===
Head coach: (Argentina) Ricardo Gareca

The following 23 players were called up for the final squad.

No.	Pos.	Player	Date of birth (age)	Caps	Goals	Club
1	GK	Pedro Gallese	February 23, 1990 (aged 26)	19	0	(Peruvian Football Federation) Juan Aurich
2	DF	Alberto Rodríguez	March 31, 1984 (aged 32)	52	0	(Peruvian Football Federation) Sporting Cristal
3	DF	Aldo Corzo	May 20, 1989 (aged 27)	8	0	(Peruvian Football Federation) Deportivo Municipal
4	DF	Renzo Revoredo	May 11, 1986 (aged 30)	18	0	(Peruvian Football Federation) Sporting Cristal
5	MF	Adán Balbín	October 13, 1986 (aged 29)	12	0	(Peruvian Football Federation) Universitario
6	DF	Miguel Trauco	August 25, 1992 (aged 23)	2	0	(Peruvian Football Federation) Universitario
7	MF	Beto da Silva	December 28, 1996 (aged 19)	0	0	(Royal Dutch Football Association) Jong PSV
8	MF	Andy Polo	September 29, 1994 (aged 21)	1	0	(Peruvian Football Federation) Universitario
9	FW	Paolo Guerrero (captain)	January 1, 1984 (aged 32)	67	26	(Brazilian Football Confederation) Flamengo
10	FW	Christian Cueva	November 23, 1991 (aged 24)	21	1	(Mexican Football Federation) Toluca
11	FW	Raúl Ruidíaz	July 25, 1990 (aged 25)	13	1	(Peruvian Football Federation) Universitario
12	GK	Diego Penny	April 22, 1984 (aged 32)	15	0	(Peruvian Football Federation) Sporting Cristal
13	MF	Renato Tapia	July 28, 1995 (aged 20)	8	0	(Royal Dutch Football Association) Feyenoord
14	MF	Armando Alfageme	November 3, 1990 (aged 25)	0	0	(Peruvian Football Federation) Deportivo Municipal
15	DF	Christian Ramos	November 4, 1988 (aged 27)	43	1	(Peruvian Football Federation) Juan Aurich
16	MF	Óscar Vílchez	January 21, 1986 (aged 30)	1	0	(Peruvian Football Federation) Alianza Lima
17	DF	Luis Abram	February 27, 1996 (aged 20)	0	0	(Peruvian Football Federation) Sporting Cristal
18	MF	Cristian Benavente	May 19, 1994 (aged 22)	9	1	(Royal Belgian Football Association) Charleroi
19	MF	Yoshimar Yotún	April 7, 1990 (aged 26)	52	1	(Swedish Football Association) Malmö FF
20	FW	Edison Flores	May 15, 1994 (aged 22)	4	0	(Peruvian Football Federation) Universitario
21	MF	Alejandro Hohberg	September 20, 1991 (aged 24)	0	0	(Peruvian Football Federation) Universidad César Vallejo
22	DF	Jair Céspedes	May 22, 1984 (aged 32)	7	0	(Peruvian Football Federation) Sporting Cristal
23	GK	Carlos Cáceda	September 27, 1991 (aged 24)	0	0	(Peruvian Football Federation) Universitario

== Group C ==
=== Jamaica ===
Head coach: (Germany) Winfried Schäfer

The following 23 players were selected for the final squad. Simon Dawkins was ruled out due to injury and replaced by Joel Grant on June 2.

No.	Pos.	Player	Date of birth (age)	Caps	Goals	Club
1	GK	Andre Blake	November 21, 1990 (aged 25)	15	0	(United States Soccer Federation) Philadelphia Union
2	DF	Damano Solomon	October 13, 1994 (aged 21)	0	0	(Jamaica Football Federation) Portmore United
3	DF	Michael Hector	July 19, 1992 (aged 23)	13	0	(The Football Association) Reading
4	DF	Wes Morgan	January 21, 1984 (aged 32)	25	0	(The Football Association) Leicester City
5	DF	Rosario Harriott	September 26, 1989 (aged 26)	1	0	(Jamaica Football Federation) Harbour View
6	FW	Dever Orgill	March 8, 1990 (aged 26)	5	0	(Football Association of Finland) IFK Mariehamn
7	MF	Chevone Marsh	February 25, 1994 (aged 22)	0	0	(Jamaica Football Federation) Cavalier
8	FW	Clayton Donaldson	February 7, 1984 (aged 32)	4	1	(The Football Association) Birmingham City
9	FW	Giles Barnes	August 5, 1988 (aged 27)	14	3	(United States Soccer Federation) Houston Dynamo
10	MF	Jobi McAnuff	November 9, 1981 (aged 34)	26	1	(The Football Association) Leyton Orient
11	MF	Andrew Vanzie	November 26, 1990 (aged 25)	3	0	(Jamaica Football Federation) Humble Lions
12	MF	Michael Binns	August 12, 1988 (aged 27)	0	0	(Jamaica Football Federation) Portmore United
13	GK	Duwayne Kerr	February 16, 1987 (aged 29)	14	0	(Football Association of Iceland) Stjarnan
14	FW	Allan Ottey	December 18, 1992 (aged 23)	5	0	(Jamaica Football Federation) Montego Bay United
15	MF	Je-Vaughn Watson	October 22, 1983 (aged 32)	54	2	(United States Soccer Federation) New England Revolution
16	MF	Lee Williamson	June 7, 1982 (aged 33)	4	0	(The Football Association) Blackburn Rovers
17	MF	Rodolph Austin	June 1, 1985 (aged 31)	84	7	(Danish Football Association) Brøndby IF
18	MF	Joel Grant	August 26, 1987 (aged 28)	13	2	(The Football Association) Exeter City
19	DF	Adrian Mariappa (captain)	October 3, 1986 (aged 29)	37	1	(The Football Association) Crystal Palace
20	DF	Kemar Lawrence	September 17, 1992 (aged 23)	31	2	(United States Soccer Federation) New York Red Bulls
21	DF	Jermaine Taylor	January 14, 1985 (aged 31)	85	0	(United States Soccer Federation) Portland Timbers
22	MF	Garath McCleary	May 15, 1987 (aged 29)	19	3	(The Football Association) Reading
23	GK	Ryan Thompson	January 7, 1985 (aged 31)	7	0	(United States Soccer Federation) Saint Louis FC

=== Mexico ===
Head coach: (Colombia) Juan Carlos Osorio

The following 23 players were called up for the final squad. Jürgen Damm withdrew due to injury and was replaced by Cándido Ramírez.

No.	Pos.	Player	Date of birth (age)	Caps	Goals	Club
1	GK	José de Jesús Corona	January 26, 1981 (aged 35)	42	0	(Mexican Football Federation) Cruz Azul
2	DF	Néstor Araujo	August 21, 1991 (aged 24)	5	1	(Mexican Football Federation) Santos Laguna
3	DF	Yasser Corona	July 28, 1987 (aged 28)	4	0	(Mexican Football Federation) Querétaro
4	DF	Rafael Márquez (captain)	February 13, 1979 (aged 37)	129	16	(Mexican Football Federation) Atlas
5	DF	Diego Reyes	September 19, 1992 (aged 23)	32	0	(Royal Spanish Football Federation) Real Sociedad
6	DF	Jorge Torres Nilo	January 16, 1988 (aged 28)	45	1	(Mexican Football Federation) UANL
7	DF	Miguel Layún	June 25, 1988 (aged 27)	38	3	(Portuguese Football Federation) Porto
8	FW	Hirving Lozano	July 30, 1995 (aged 20)	2	1	(Mexican Football Federation) Pachuca
9	FW	Raúl Jiménez	May 5, 1991 (aged 25)	42	8	(Portuguese Football Federation) Benfica
10	FW	Jesús Manuel Corona	January 6, 1993 (aged 23)	20	5	(Portuguese Football Federation) Porto
11	MF	Javier Aquino	February 11, 1990 (aged 26)	35	0	(Mexican Football Federation) UANL
12	GK	Alfredo Talavera	September 18, 1982 (aged 33)	20	0	(Mexican Football Federation) Toluca
13	GK	Guillermo Ochoa	July 13, 1985 (aged 30)	74	0	(Royal Spanish Football Federation) Málaga
14	FW	Javier Hernández	June 1, 1988 (aged 28)	80	45	(German Football Association) Bayer Leverkusen
15	DF	Héctor Moreno	January 17, 1988 (aged 28)	66	1	(Royal Dutch Football Association) PSV Eindhoven
16	MF	Héctor Herrera	April 19, 1990 (aged 26)	39	3	(Portuguese Football Federation) Porto
17	MF	Cándido Ramírez	June 5, 1993 (aged 22)	1	0	(Mexican Football Federation) Monterrey
18	MF	Andrés Guardado	September 28, 1986 (aged 29)	124	23	(Royal Dutch Football Association) PSV Eindhoven
19	FW	Oribe Peralta	January 12, 1984 (aged 32)	46	22	(Mexican Football Federation) América
20	MF	Jesús Dueñas	March 16, 1989 (aged 27)	6	1	(Mexican Football Federation) UANL
21	MF	Carlos Peña	March 25, 1990 (aged 26)	16	1	(Mexican Football Federation) Guadalajara
22	DF	Paul Aguilar	March 6, 1986 (aged 30)	50	5	(Mexican Football Federation) América
23	MF	Jesús Molina	March 29, 1988 (aged 28)	11	0	(Mexican Football Federation) Santos Laguna

=== Uruguay ===
Head coach: Óscar Tabárez

The following 23 players were selected for the final squad. On May 30, Cristian Rodríguez pulled out due to injury and was replaced by Diego Laxalt.

No.	Pos.	Player	Date of birth (age)	Caps	Goals	Club
1	GK	Fernando Muslera	June 16, 1986 (aged 29)	79	0	(Turkish Football Federation) Galatasaray
2	DF	José Giménez	January 20, 1995 (aged 21)	25	3	(Royal Spanish Football Federation) Atlético Madrid
3	DF	Diego Godín (captain)	February 16, 1986 (aged 30)	97	7	(Royal Spanish Football Federation) Atlético Madrid
4	DF	Jorge Fucile	November 19, 1984 (aged 31)	46	0	(Uruguayan Football Association) Nacional
5	MF	Carlos Sánchez	December 2, 1984 (aged 31)	16	0	(Mexican Football Federation) Monterrey
6	DF	Álvaro Pereira	November 28, 1985 (aged 30)	78	7	(Royal Spanish Football Federation) Getafe
7	MF	Diego Laxalt	February 7, 1993 (aged 23)	0	0	(Italian Football Federation) Genoa
8	FW	Abel Hernández	August 8, 1990 (aged 25)	25	10	(The Football Association) Hull City
9	FW	Luis Suárez	January 24, 1987 (aged 29)	84	45	(Royal Spanish Football Federation) Barcelona
10	MF	Gastón Ramírez	December 2, 1990 (aged 25)	34	0	(The Football Association) Middlesbrough
11	FW	Cristhian Stuani	December 10, 1986 (aged 29)	27	5	(The Football Association) Middlesbrough
12	GK	Martín Campaña	May 29, 1989 (aged 27)	0	0	(Argentine Football Association) Independiente
13	DF	Mauricio Victorino	October 11, 1982 (aged 33)	23	0	(Uruguayan Football Association) Nacional
14	MF	Nicolás Lodeiro	March 21, 1989 (aged 27)	44	3	(Argentine Football Association) Boca Juniors
15	MF	Matías Vecino	August 24, 1991 (aged 24)	2	0	(Italian Football Federation) Fiorentina
16	DF	Maxi Pereira	June 8, 1984 (aged 31)	110	3	(Portuguese Football Federation) Porto
17	MF	Egidio Arévalo	January 1, 1982 (aged 34)	77	0	(Mexican Football Federation) Atlas
18	DF	Mathías Corujo	May 8, 1986 (aged 30)	12	0	(Football Federation of Chile) Universidad de Chile
19	DF	Gastón Silva	March 5, 1994 (aged 22)	2	0	(Italian Football Federation) Torino
20	MF	Álvaro González	October 29, 1984 (aged 31)	62	3	(Mexican Football Federation) Atlas
21	FW	Edinson Cavani	February 14, 1987 (aged 29)	80	30	(French Football Federation) Paris Saint-Germain
22	FW	Diego Rolán	March 24, 1993 (aged 23)	18	3	(French Football Federation) Bordeaux
23	GK	Martín Silva	March 25, 1983 (aged 33)	7	0	(Brazilian Football Confederation) Vasco da Gama

=== Venezuela ===
Head coach: Rafael Dudamel

The following 23 players were selected for the final squad.

No.	Pos.	Player	Date of birth (age)	Caps	Goals	Club
1	GK	José Contreras	October 20, 1994 (aged 21)	2	0	(Venezuelan Football Federation) Deportivo Táchira
2	DF	Wilker Ángel	March 18, 1993 (aged 23)	4	2	(Venezuelan Football Federation) Deportivo Táchira
3	DF	Mikel Villanueva	April 14, 1993 (aged 23)	2	1	(Royal Spanish Football Federation) Atlético Malagueño
4	DF	Oswaldo Vizcarrondo	May 31, 1984 (aged 32)	71	8	(French Football Federation) Nantes
5	MF	Arquímedes Figuera	October 6, 1989 (aged 26)	8	1	(Venezuelan Football Federation) Deportivo La Guaira
6	DF	José Manuel Velázquez	September 8, 1990 (aged 25)	15	1	(Portuguese Football Federation) Arouca
7	FW	Yonathan Del Valle	May 28, 1990 (aged 26)	10	0	(Turkish Football Federation) Kasımpaşa
8	MF	Tomás Rincón (captain)	January 13, 1988 (aged 28)	69	0	(Italian Football Federation) Genoa
9	FW	Salomón Rondón	September 16, 1989 (aged 26)	49	16	(The Football Association) West Bromwich Albion
10	MF	Rómulo Otero	November 9, 1992 (aged 23)	11	4	(Football Federation of Chile) Huachipato
11	MF	Juanpi	January 24, 1994 (aged 22)	3	0	(Royal Spanish Football Federation) Málaga
12	GK	Dani Hernández	October 21, 1985 (aged 30)	20	0	(Royal Spanish Football Federation) Tenerife
13	MF	Luis Manuel Seijas	June 23, 1986 (aged 29)	62	2	(Colombian Football Federation) Santa Fe
14	MF	Carlos Suárez	April 26, 1992 (aged 24)	0	0	(Venezuelan Football Federation) Carabobo
15	MF	Alejandro Guerra	July 9, 1985 (aged 30)	52	4	(Colombian Football Federation) Atlético Nacional
16	DF	Roberto Rosales	November 20, 1988 (aged 27)	63	0	(Royal Spanish Football Federation) Málaga
17	FW	Josef Martínez	May 19, 1993 (aged 23)	24	4	(Italian Football Federation) Torino
18	MF	Adalberto Peñaranda	May 31, 1997 (aged 19)	2	0	(Royal Spanish Football Federation) Granada
19	FW	Christian Santos	March 24, 1988 (aged 28)	4	1	(Royal Dutch Football Association) NEC
20	DF	Rolf Feltscher	June 10, 1990 (aged 25)	5	0	(German Football Association) MSV Duisburg
21	DF	Alexander González	September 13, 1992 (aged 23)	30	1	(Royal Spanish Football Federation) Huesca
22	MF	Yangel Herrera	January 7, 1998 (aged 18)	0	0	(Venezuelan Football Federation) Atlético Venezuela
23	GK	Wuilker Faríñez	February 15, 1998 (aged 18)	0	0	(Venezuelan Football Federation) Caracas

== Group D ==
=== Argentina ===
Head coach: Gerardo Martino

The following 23 players were selected for the final squad.

No.	Pos.	Player	Date of birth (age)	Caps	Goals	Club
1	GK	Sergio Romero	February 22, 1987 (aged 29)	72	0	(The Football Association) Manchester United
2	DF	Jonatan Maidana	July 29, 1985 (aged 30)	2	0	(Argentine Football Association) River Plate
3	DF	Facundo Roncaglia	February 10, 1987 (aged 29)	10	0	(Italian Football Federation) Fiorentina
4	DF	Gabriel Mercado	March 18, 1987 (aged 29)	4	2	(Argentine Football Association) River Plate
5	MF	Matías Kranevitter	May 21, 1993 (aged 23)	4	0	(Royal Spanish Football Federation) Atlético Madrid
6	MF	Lucas Biglia	January 30, 1986 (aged 30)	37	1	(Italian Football Federation) Lazio
7	MF	Ángel Di María	February 14, 1988 (aged 28)	72	16	(French Football Federation) Paris Saint-Germain
8	MF	Augusto Fernández	April 10, 1986 (aged 30)	11	1	(Royal Spanish Football Federation) Atlético Madrid
9	FW	Gonzalo Higuaín	December 10, 1987 (aged 28)	56	25	(Italian Football Federation) Napoli
10	FW	Lionel Messi (captain)	June 24, 1987 (aged 28)	112	50	(Royal Spanish Football Federation) Barcelona
11	FW	Sergio Agüero	June 2, 1988 (aged 28)	71	32	(The Football Association) Manchester City
12	GK	Nahuel Guzmán	February 10, 1986 (aged 30)	6	0	(Mexican Football Federation) UANL
13	DF	Ramiro Funes Mori	March 5, 1991 (aged 25)	6	0	(The Football Association) Everton
14	MF	Javier Mascherano (vice-captain)	June 8, 1984 (aged 31)	123	3	(Royal Spanish Football Federation) Barcelona
15	DF	Víctor Cuesta	November 19, 1988 (aged 27)	0	0	(Argentine Football Association) Independiente
16	DF	Marcos Rojo	March 20, 1990 (aged 26)	43	2	(The Football Association) Manchester United
17	DF	Nicolás Otamendi	February 12, 1988 (aged 28)	31	2	(The Football Association) Manchester City
18	MF	Erik Lamela	March 4, 1992 (aged 24)	15	1	(The Football Association) Tottenham Hotspur
19	MF	Éver Banega	June 29, 1988 (aged 27)	40	4	(Royal Spanish Football Federation) Sevilla
20	MF	Nicolás Gaitán	February 23, 1988 (aged 28)	12	2	(Portuguese Football Federation) Benfica
21	MF	Javier Pastore	June 20, 1989 (aged 26)	27	2	(French Football Federation) Paris Saint-Germain
22	FW	Ezequiel Lavezzi	May 3, 1985 (aged 31)	49	7	(Chinese Football Association) Hebei China Fortune
23	GK	Mariano Andújar	July 30, 1983 (aged 32)	11	0	(Argentine Football Association) Estudiantes

=== Bolivia ===
Head coach: Julio César Baldivieso

The following 23 players were called up for the final squad. Samuel Galindo withdrew due to injury and was replaced by Carmelo Algarañaz. Nelson Cabrera was subsequently found to be ineligible by FIFA after the tournament.

No.	Pos.	Player	Date of birth (age)	Caps	Goals	Club
1	GK	Carlos Lampe (captain)	March 17, 1987 (aged 29)	4	0	(Bolivian Football Federation) Sport Boys
2	DF	Erwin Saavedra	February 25, 1996 (aged 20)	3	0	(Bolivian Football Federation) Bolívar
3	DF	Luis Alberto Gutiérrez	March 10, 1985 (aged 31)	31	0	(Israel Football Association) Ironi Kiryat Shmona
4	DF	Diego Bejarano	August 24, 1991 (aged 24)	11	1	(Bolivian Football Federation) The Strongest
5	DF	Nelson Cabrera	April 22, 1983 (aged 33)	0	0	(Bolivian Football Federation) Bolívar
6	MF	Wálter Veizaga	April 22, 1986 (aged 30)	17	0	(Bolivian Football Federation) The Strongest
7	FW	Juan Carlos Arce	April 10, 1985 (aged 31)	49	8	(Bolivian Football Federation) Bolívar
8	MF	Martin Smedberg-Dalence	May 10, 1984 (aged 32)	8	1	(Swedish Football Association) IFK Göteborg
9	FW	Yasmani Duk	March 1, 1988 (aged 28)	6	1	(United States Soccer Federation) New York Cosmos
10	MF	Jhasmani Campos	May 10, 1988 (aged 28)	33	2	(Kuwait Football Association) Kazma
11	FW	Gilbert Álvarez	April 7, 1992 (aged 24)	4	0	(Bolivian Football Federation) Real Potosí
12	GK	Romel Quiñónez	June 25, 1992 (aged 23)	13	0	(Bolivian Football Federation) Bolívar
13	MF	Alejandro Meleán	June 16, 1987 (aged 28)	10	0	(Bolivian Football Federation) Oriente Petrolero
14	MF	Raúl Castro	August 19, 1989 (aged 26)	0	0	(Bolivian Football Federation) The Strongest
15	MF	Pedro Azogue	December 6, 1994 (aged 21)	9	0	(Bolivian Football Federation) Oriente Petrolero
16	MF	Cristhian Machado	June 20, 1990 (aged 25)	0	0	(Bolivian Football Federation) Jorge Wilstermann
17	DF	Marvin Bejarano	March 6, 1988 (aged 28)	26	0	(Bolivian Football Federation) Oriente Petrolero
18	FW	Rodrigo Ramallo	October 14, 1990 (aged 25)	8	2	(Bolivian Football Federation) The Strongest
19	MF	Carmelo Algarañaz	January 27, 1996 (aged 20)	1	0	(Bolivian Football Federation) Petrolero
20	MF	Fernando Saucedo	March 15, 1990 (aged 26)	1	0	(Bolivian Football Federation) Jorge Wilstermann
21	DF	Ronald Eguino	February 20, 1988 (aged 28)	15	0	(Bolivian Football Federation) Bolívar
22	DF	Edward Zenteno	December 5, 1984 (aged 31)	25	0	(Bolivian Football Federation) Jorge Wilstermann
23	GK	Guillermo Viscarra	February 7, 1993 (aged 23)	0	0	(Bolivian Football Federation) Oriente Petrolero

=== Chile ===
Head coach: (Spain) Juan Antonio Pizzi

The following 23 players were called up for the final squad. On June 1, Matías Fernández pulled out due to injury and was replaced by Mark González.

No.	Pos.	Player	Date of birth (age)	Caps	Goals	Club
1	GK	Claudio Bravo (captain)	April 13, 1983 (aged 33)	100	0	(Royal Spanish Football Federation) Barcelona
2	DF	Eugenio Mena	July 18, 1988 (aged 27)	44	3	(Brazilian Football Confederation) São Paulo
3	DF	Enzo Roco	August 16, 1992 (aged 23)	6	1	(Royal Spanish Football Federation) Espanyol
4	DF	Mauricio Isla	June 12, 1988 (aged 27)	73	3	(French Football Federation) Marseille
5	MF	Francisco Silva	February 11, 1986 (aged 30)	23	0	(Mexican Football Federation) Chiapas
6	FW	José Pedro Fuenzalida	February 22, 1985 (aged 31)	26	1	(Football Federation of Chile) Universidad Católica
7	FW	Alexis Sánchez	December 19, 1988 (aged 27)	93	31	(The Football Association) Arsenal
8	MF	Arturo Vidal	May 22, 1987 (aged 29)	74	15	(German Football Association) Bayern Munich
9	FW	Mauricio Pinilla	February 4, 1984 (aged 32)	39	8	(Italian Football Federation) Atalanta
10	MF	Pablo Hernández	October 24, 1986 (aged 29)	4	3	(Royal Spanish Football Federation) Celta Vigo
11	FW	Eduardo Vargas	November 20, 1989 (aged 26)	52	25	(German Football Association) 1899 Hoffenheim
12	GK	Cristopher Toselli	June 22, 1988 (aged 27)	4	0	(Football Federation of Chile) Universidad Católica
13	MF	Erick Pulgar	January 15, 1994 (aged 22)	2	0	(Italian Football Federation) Bologna
14	FW	Mark González	July 10, 1984 (aged 31)	54	6	(Brazilian Football Confederation) Sport Recife
15	DF	Jean Beausejour	June 3, 1984 (aged 32)	75	6	(Football Federation of Chile) Colo-Colo
16	FW	Nicolás Castillo	February 14, 1993 (aged 23)	2	0	(Football Federation of Chile) Universidad Católica
17	DF	Gary Medel	August 3, 1987 (aged 28)	87	7	(Italian Football Federation) Inter Milan
18	DF	Gonzalo Jara	August 29, 1985 (aged 30)	87	3	(Football Federation of Chile) Universidad de Chile
19	FW	Fabián Orellana	January 27, 1986 (aged 30)	35	2	(Royal Spanish Football Federation) Celta Vigo
20	MF	Charles Aránguiz	April 17, 1989 (aged 27)	40	6	(German Football Association) Bayer Leverkusen
21	MF	Marcelo Díaz	December 30, 1986 (aged 29)	43	1	(Royal Spanish Football Federation) Celta Vigo
22	FW	Edson Puch	April 9, 1986 (aged 30)	6	0	(Ecuadorian Football Federation) LDU Quito
23	GK	Johnny Herrera	May 9, 1981 (aged 35)	14	0	(Football Federation of Chile) Universidad de Chile

=== Panama ===
Head coach: (Colombia) Hernán Darío Gómez

The following 23 players were called up for the final squad.

No.	Pos.	Player	Date of birth (age)	Caps	Goals	Club
1	GK	Jaime Penedo	September 26, 1981 (aged 34)	114	0	(Costa Rican Football Federation) Saprissa
2	MF	Miguel Camargo	May 9, 1993 (aged 23)	10	0	(Venezuelan Football Federation) Mineros de Guayana
3	DF	Harold Cummings	January 3, 1992 (aged 24)	41	0	(Costa Rican Football Federation) Alajuelense
4	DF	Fidel Escobar	January 9, 1995 (aged 21)	4	0	(Panamanian Football Federation) Sporting San Miguelito
5	DF	Roderick Miller	March 4, 1992 (aged 24)	15	0	(Panamanian Football Federation) San Francisco
6	MF	Gabriel Gómez	May 29, 1984 (aged 32)	121	10	(Costa Rican Football Federation) Cartaginés
7	FW	Blas Pérez	March 13, 1981 (aged 35)	105	37	(Canadian Soccer Association) Vancouver Whitecaps FC
8	FW	Gabriel Torres	October 31, 1988 (aged 27)	53	7	(Venezuelan Football Federation) Zamora
9	FW	Roberto Nurse	December 16, 1983 (aged 32)	15	3	(Mexican Football Federation) Zacatecas
10	FW	Luis Tejada	March 28, 1982 (aged 34)	91	42	(Peruvian Football Federation) Juan Aurich
11	MF	Armando Cooper	November 26, 1987 (aged 28)	67	5	(Panamanian Football Federation) Árabe Unido
12	GK	Álex Rodríguez	May 8, 1990 (aged 26)	3	0	(Panamanian Football Federation) San Francisco
13	DF	Adolfo Machado	February 14, 1985 (aged 31)	62	1	(Costa Rican Football Federation) Saprissa
14	MF	Valentín Pimentel	May 30, 1991 (aged 25)	16	1	(Colombian Football Federation) La Equidad
15	DF	Martín Gómez	January 23, 1990 (aged 26)	8	1	(Panamanian Football Federation) San Francisco
16	FW	Abdiel Arroyo	December 13, 1993 (aged 22)	13	0	(Croatian Football Federation) RNK Split
17	DF	Luis Henríquez	November 23, 1981 (aged 34)	87	2	(Panamanian Football Federation) Tauro
18	MF	Ricardo Buitrago	March 10, 1986 (aged 30)	18	3	(Peruvian Football Federation) Juan Aurich
19	MF	Alberto Quintero	December 18, 1987 (aged 28)	67	4	(United States Soccer Federation) San Jose Earthquakes
20	MF	Aníbal Godoy	February 10, 1990 (aged 26)	55	1	(United States Soccer Federation) San Jose Earthquakes
21	MF	Amílcar Henríquez	August 2, 1983 (aged 32)	69	0	(Colombian Football Federation) América de Cali
22	GK	José Calderón	August 14, 1985 (aged 30)	13	0	(National Autonomous Federation of Football of Honduras) Platense
23	DF	Felipe Baloy (captain)	February 24, 1981 (aged 35)	92	3	(Mexican Football Federation) Atlas

== Player representation ==
=== By age ===
==== Players ====
- Oldest: (Paraguay) Justo Villar (38 years, 339 days)
- Youngest: (United States) Christian Pulisic (17 years, 259 days)

==== Goalkeepers ====
- Oldest: (Paraguay) Justo Villar (38 years, 339 days)
- Youngest: (Venezuela) Wuilker Faríñez (18 years, 109 days)

==== Captains ====
- Oldest: (Paraguay) Justo Villar (38 years, 339 days)
- Youngest: (Colombia) James Rodríguez (24 years, 327 days)

=== By club ===
Clubs are ordered alphabetically: first by country, then by club name.

Players	Clubs
6	(Colombia) Atlético Nacional (Peru) Universitario
5	(Bolivia) Bolívar (France) Paris Saint-Germain (Mexico) América (Spain) Atlético Madrid (Spain) Barcelona
4	(Bolivia) Oriente Petrolero (Bolivia) The Strongest (Chile) Universidad Católica (Costa Rica) Saprissa (Ecuador) Emelec (Mexico) Atlas (Mexico) Monterrey (Mexico) UANL (Peru) Juan Aurich (Peru) Sporting Cristal (Portugal) Porto (United States) San Jose Earthquakes
3	(Argentina) Independiente (Bolivia) Jorge Wilstermann (Brazil) Atlético Mineiro (Brazil) Grêmio (Brazil) São Paulo (Canada) Vancouver Whitecaps FC; Universidad de Chile (Colombia) Santa Fe (Costa Rica) Alajuelense (Costa Rica) Herediano (England) Arsenal (England) Everton (England) Manchester United (Italy) Fiorentina (Italy) Inter Milan (Mexico) Pachuca (Mexico) Toluca (Netherlands) PSV Eindhoven (Panama) San Francisco (Paraguay) Cerro Porteño (Paraguay) Olimpia (Portugal) Benfica (Spain) Celta Vigo (Spain) Málaga (United States) Sporting Kansas City
2	(Argentina) Boca Juniors (Argentina) Lanús (Argentina) Racing (Argentina) River Plate (Brazil) Corinthians (Brazil) Santos (Chile) Colo-Colo (Ecuador) LDU Quito (England) Aston Villa (England) Manchester City (England) Middlesbrough (England) Reading (England) Watford (England) West Bromwich Albion (France) Nantes (Germany) Bayer Leverkusen (Italy) Milan (Italy) Torino (Jamaica) Portmore United (Mexico) Cruz Azul (Mexico) Querétaro (Mexico) Santos Laguna (Mexico) Tijuana (Peru) Alianza Lima (Peru) Deportivo Municipal (Spain) Espanyol (Spain) Real Madrid (Uruguay) Nacional (United States) D.C. United (United States) Jacksonville Armada (United States) Portland Timbers (United States) Seattle Sounders FC (Venezuela) Deportivo Táchira
1	(Argentina) Atlético Uruguay (Argentina) Estudiantes (Argentina) Godoy Cruz (Argentina) San Lorenzo (Belgium) Charleroi (Belgium) Standard Liège (Bolivia) Petrolero (Bolivia) Sport Boys (Brazil) Flamengo (Brazil) Internacional (Brazil) Sport Recife (Brazil) Vasco da Gama (Canada) Montreal Impact (Canada) Toronto FC (Chile) Huachipato; Beijing Guoan; Hebei China Fortune; Shandong Luneng (Colombia) América de Cali (Colombia) Deportivo Cali (Colombia) Independiente Medellín (Colombia) Junior (Colombia) La Equidad (Costa Rica) Carmelita (Costa Rica) Cartaginés (Croatia) RNK Split (Denmark) Brøndby (Denmark) Midtjylland (Ecuador) Barcelona SC (Ecuador) El Nacional (Ecuador) Independiente del Valle; Bournemouth; Birmingham City; Blackburn Rovers; Chelsea; Crystal Palace; Hull City; Leicester City; Leyton Orient; Liverpool; Stoke City; Sunderland; Swansea City; Tottenham Hotspur; West Ham United (Finland) IFK Mariehamn (France) Bordeaux (France) Caen (France) Cholet (France) Evian (France) Laval (France) Marseille (France) Monaco (France) Nice (France) Paris Saint-Germain B (France) Reims (Germany) Bayern Munich (Germany) Borussia Dortmund (Germany) Borussia Mönchengladbach (Germany) MSV Duisburg (Germany) Hertha BSC (Germany) 1899 Hoffenheim (Germany) FC Ingolstadt (Germany) Union Berlin (Haiti) Aigle Noir (Honduras) Platense (Hungary) Ferencváros (India) Mohun Bagan (Iran) Persepolis (Israel) Ironi Kiryat Shmona (Italy) Atalanta (Italy) Bologna (Italy) Genoa (Italy) Juventus (Italy) Lazio (Italy) Napoli (Jamaica) Cavalier (Jamaica) Harbour View (Jamaica) Humble Lions (Jamaica) Montego Bay United (Kuwait) Kazma (Mexico) Chiapas (Mexico) Guadalajara (Mexico) UNAM (Mexico) Zacatecas (Netherlands) AZ (Netherlands) Feyenoord (Netherlands) Jong PSV (Netherlands) NEC (Norway) Molde (Norway) Sarpsborg 08 (Panama) Árabe Unido (Panama) Sporting San Miguelito (Panama) Tauro (Peru) Universidad César Vallejo (Poland) Wisła Kraków (Poland) Chrobry Głogów (Portugal) Arouca (Portugal) Sporting CP (Portugal) Vila Real (Romania) Voluntari (Russia) Rostov (Russia) Zenit Saint Petersburg (Scotland) Heart of Midlothian (Spain) Atlético Malagueño (Spain) Deportivo La Coruña (Spain) Getafe (Spain) Huesca (Spain) Real Sociedad (Spain) Sevilla (Spain) Sporting Gijón (Spain) Tenerife (Spain) Valencia (Sweden) IFK Göteborg (Sweden) Malmö FF (Switzerland) Aarau (Turkey) 1461 Trabzon (Turkey) Galatasaray (Turkey) Kasımpaşa (Ukraine) Dynamo Kyiv (United States) Carolina RailHawks (United States) Colorado Rapids (United States) FC Dallas (United States) Fort Lauderdale Strikers (United States) Houston Dynamo (United States) LA Galaxy (United States) Minnesota United FC (United States) New England Revolution (United States) New York Cosmos (United States) New York Red Bulls (United States) New York City FC (United States) Orlando City SC (United States) Philadelphia Union (United States) Real Salt Lake (United States) Saint Louis FC; Atlético Venezuela; Carabobo; Caracas; Deportivo La Guaira; Mineros de Guayana; Zamora (Vietnam) Saigon

=== By club nationality ===
Nations in bold are represented by their national teams in the tournament

Players	Clubs
36	**Mexico**
35	England
30	Spain
29	**United States**
19	**Peru**
18	**Bolivia**
17	France
15	**Argentina**; Italy
14	**Brazil**; **Colombia**
12	**Costa Rica**
11	Germany
10	**Chile**; **Ecuador**; Portugal
8	**Venezuela**
7	Netherlands
6	**Jamaica**; **Panama**; **Paraguay**
5	Canada
3	China; Turkey
2	Belgium; Denmark; Norway; Poland; Russia; Sweden; **Uruguay**
1	Croatia; Finland; **Haiti**; Honduras; Hungary; India; Iran; Israel; Kuwait; Romania; Scotland; Switzerland; Ukraine; Vietnam
