= Copa América Centenario Group D =

Football tournament group stage

Group D of the Copa América Centenario consisted of Argentina, defending champions Chile, Panama, and Bolivia. Matches began on June 6 and ended on June 14, 2016. All times are EDT (UTC−4).

Argentina and Chile advanced to the quarter-finals.

== Teams ==
Draw position	Team	Confederation	Method of qualification	Finals appearance	Last appearance	Previous best performance	FIFA Rankings	
Draw position	Team	Confederation	Method of qualification	Finals appearance	Last appearance	Previous best performance	December 2015 (Note: The rankings of December 2015 were used for seeding for the final draw, except for certain cases.)	June 2016
D1 (seed)	Argentina	CONMEBOL	Automatic qualifier	41st	2015	Winners (Fourteen times)	2	1
D2	Chile	CONMEBOL	Automatic qualifier	38th	2015	Winners (2015)	5	5
D3	Panama	CONCACAF	Qualifying play-offs winners	1st	—	—	64	56
D4	Bolivia	CONMEBOL	Automatic qualifier	26th	2015	Winners (1963)	68	82

== Standings ==
Pos	Team	Pld	W	D	L	GF	GA	GD	Pts	Qualification
1	Argentina	3	3	0	0	10	1	+9	9	Advance to knockout stage
2	Chile	3	2	0	1	7	5	+2	6	Advance to knockout stage
3	Panama	3	1	0	2	4	10	−6	3	
4	Bolivia	3	0	0	3	2	7	−5	0	

Source: CONMEBOL & CONCACAF
Rules for classification: Group stage tiebreakers

In the quarter-finals:

- The winner of Group D, Argentina, advanced to play the runner-up of Group C, Venezuela.
- The runner-up of Group D, Chile, advanced to play the winner of Group C, Mexico.

== Matches ==
=== Panama vs Bolivia ===
The two teams had met in four previous encounters, the latest being a friendly held at the Estadio Ramón Tahuichi Aguilera in Santa Cruz, which Panama won 3–1. This match marked Panama's debut in Copa América, making them the third Central American country to appear at the tournament, after Costa Rica and Honduras.

June 6, 2016
7:00 p.m.

Panama	2–1	Bolivia
Pérez 11', 87'	Report (CONMEBOL); Report (CONCACAF)	Arce 54'

Camping World Stadium, Orlando, Florida
Attendance: 13,466
Referee: Ricardo Montero (Costa Rica)

Panama	Bolivia

GK	1	Jaime Penedo
RB	13	Adolfo Machado	(yellow card) 79'
CB	23	Felipe Baloy (c)	(yellow card) 77'
CB	3	Harold Cummings	(yellow card) 53'	(substituted off) 63'
LB	5	Roderick Miller
RM	11	Armando Cooper	(yellow card) 68'	(substituted off) 74'
CM	20	Aníbal Godoy
CM	6	Gabriel Gómez
LM	19	Alberto Quintero
CF	7	Blas Pérez	(yellow card) 60'
CF	8	Gabriel Torres		(substituted off) 56'
Substitutions:
FW	10	Luis Tejada		(substituted on) 56'
DF	17	Luis Henríquez		(substituted on) 63'
FW	16	Abdiel Arroyo		(substituted on) 74'
Manager:
(Colombia) Hernán Darío Gómez

GK	1	Carlos Lampe (c)
CB	21	Ronald Eguino		(substituted off) 46'
CB	5	Nelson Cabrera
CB	22	Edward Zenteno
RM	4	Diego Bejarano
CM	20	Fernando Saucedo		(substituted off) 46'
CM	15	Pedro Azogue	(yellow card) 77'
LM	17	Marvin Bejarano
RW	8	Martin Smedberg-Dalence
CF	9	Yasmani Duk		(substituted off) 87'
LW	7	Juan Carlos Arce	(yellow card) 17'
Substitutions:
MF	10	Jhasmani Campos		(substituted on) 46'
MF	13	Alejandro Meleán		(substituted on) 46'
FW	18	Rodrigo Ramallo		(substituted on) 87'
Manager:
Julio César Baldivieso

Man of the Match:
Blas Pérez (Panama)

Assistant referees:
Octavio Jara (Costa Rica)
Juan Carlos Mora (Costa Rica)
Fourth official:
Wilson Lamouroux (Colombia)
Fifth official:
Peter Manikowski (United States)

=== Argentina vs Chile ===
The two teams had met in eighty-six previous occasions, the last being a 2018 FIFA World Cup qualifying match held at the Estadio Nacional Julio Martínez Prádanos in Santiago in early 2016, which Argentina won 2–1. Their last Copa América meeting was the 2015 Copa América Final, where Chile earned their first Copa América title by defeating Argentina 4–1 in a penalty shoot-out after a scoreless draw.

June 6, 2016
10:00 p.m.

Argentina	2–1	Chile
Di María 51'; Banega 59'	Report (CONMEBOL); Report (CONCACAF)	Fuenzalida 90+3'

Levi's Stadium, Santa Clara, California
Attendance: 69,451
Referee: Daniel Fedorczuk (Uruguay)

Argentina	Chile

GK	1	Sergio Romero
RB	4	Gabriel Mercado
CB	17	Nicolás Otamendi
CB	13	Ramiro Funes Mori
LB	16	Marcos Rojo	(yellow card) 70'
CM	8	Augusto Fernández
CM	14	Javier Mascherano (c)
RW	20	Nicolás Gaitán		(substituted off) 87'
AM	19	Éver Banega
LW	7	Ángel Di María	(yellow card) 65'	(substituted off) 80'
CF	9	Gonzalo Higuaín		(substituted off) 74'
Substitutions:
FW	11	Sergio Agüero		(substituted on) 74'
MF	18	Erik Lamela		(substituted on) 80'
MF	5	Matías Kranevitter		(substituted on) 87'
Manager:
Gerardo Martino

GK	1	Claudio Bravo (c)
RB	4	Mauricio Isla	(yellow card) 44'
CB	17	Gary Medel	(yellow card) 65'
CB	18	Gonzalo Jara
LB	2	Eugenio Mena		(substituted off) 54'
CM	20	Charles Aránguiz		(substituted off) 82'
CM	21	Marcelo Díaz
CM	8	Arturo Vidal	(yellow card) 19'
RW	7	Alexis Sánchez
CF	11	Eduardo Vargas		(substituted off) 68'
LW	15	Jean Beausejour	(yellow card) 86'
Substitutions:
FW	19	Fabián Orellana		(substituted on) 54'
FW	9	Mauricio Pinilla		(substituted on) 68'
DF	6	José Pedro Fuenzalida		(substituted on) 82'
Manager:
Argentina Juan Antonio Pizzi

Man of the Match:
Ángel Di María (Argentina)

Assistant referees:
Nicolás Taran (Uruguay)
Richard Trinidad (Uruguay)
Fourth official:
Jair Marrufo (United States)
Fifth official:
Corey Parker (United States)

=== Chile vs Bolivia ===
The two teams had met in forty-one previous occasions, the last being a 2015 Copa América group stage match won by Chile 5–0.

June 10, 2016
7:00 p.m.

Chile	2–1	Bolivia
Vidal 46', 90+10' (pen.)	Report (CONMEBOL); Report (CONCACAF)	Campos 61'

Gillette Stadium, Foxborough, Massachusetts
Attendance: 19,392
Referee: Jair Marrufo (United States)

Chile	Bolivia

GK	1	Claudio Bravo (c)
RB	4	Mauricio Isla		(substituted off) 76'
CB	17	Gary Medel
CB	18	Gonzalo Jara
LB	15	Jean Beausejour
CM	20	Charles Aránguiz
CM	10	Pablo Hernández	(yellow card) 79'
CM	8	Arturo Vidal
RW	7	Alexis Sánchez
CF	9	Mauricio Pinilla		(substituted off) 58'
LW	19	Fabián Orellana		(substituted off) 68'
Substitutions:
FW	11	Eduardo Vargas		(substituted on) 58'
FW	22	Edson Puch		(substituted on) 68'
DF	6	José Pedro Fuenzalida		(substituted on) 76'
Manager:
Argentina Juan Antonio Pizzi

GK	1	Carlos Lampe
CB	21	Ronald Eguino	(yellow card) 5'
CB	22	Edward Zenteno
CB	3	Luis Alberto Gutiérrez	(yellow card) 90+9'
RWB	2	Erwin Saavedra
LWB	17	Marvin Bejarano
CM	8	Martin Smedberg-Dalence
CM	13	Alejandro Meleán
CM	14	Raúl Castro		(substituted off) 58'
CF	7	Juan Carlos Arce (c)		(substituted off) 54'
CF	9	Yasmani Duk		(substituted off) 82'
Substitutions:
FW	18	Rodrigo Ramallo		(substituted on) 54'
MF	10	Jhasmani Campos	(yellow card) 78'	(substituted on) 58'
MF	6	Wálter Veizaga	(yellow card) 90+9'	(substituted on) 82'
Manager:
Julio César Baldivieso

Man of the Match:
Arturo Vidal (Chile)

Assistant referees:
Corey Rockwell (United States)
Peter Manikowski (United States)
Fourth official:
Armando Villarreal (United States)
Fifth official:
Cristian Ramírez (Honduras)

=== Argentina vs Panama ===
The two teams had met in just one previous occasion, a friendly match held at the Estadio Brigadier General Estanislao López in 2011, won by Argentina 3–1.

June 10, 2016
9:30 p.m.

Argentina	5–0	Panama
Otamendi 7'; Messi 68', 78', 87'; Agüero 90'	Report (CONMEBOL); Report (CONCACAF)

Soldier Field, Chicago, Illinois
Attendance: 53,885
Referee: Joel Aguilar (El Salvador)

Argentina	Panama

GK	1	Sergio Romero
RB	4	Gabriel Mercado
CB	17	Nicolás Otamendi
CB	13	Ramiro Funes Mori
LB	16	Marcos Rojo
CM	19	Éver Banega
CM	14	Javier Mascherano (c)	(yellow card) 17'
CM	8	Augusto Fernández	(yellow card) 15'	(substituted off) 61'
RF	20	Nicolás Gaitán	(yellow card) 66'
CF	9	Gonzalo Higuaín		(substituted off) 76'
LF	7	Ángel Di María		(substituted off) 43'
Substitutions:
MF	18	Erik Lamela		(substituted on) 43'
FW	10	Lionel Messi		(substituted on) 61'
FW	11	Sergio Agüero		(substituted on) 76'
Manager:
Gerardo Martino

GK	1	Jaime Penedo
RB	13	Adolfo Machado
CB	23	Felipe Baloy (c)	(yellow card) 17'
CB	5	Roderick Miller
LB	17	Luis Henríquez	(yellow card) 78'
DM	6	Gabriel Gómez
RM	20	Aníbal Godoy	(yellow card) 22' (yellow-red card) 31'
CM	14	Valentín Pimentel		(substituted off) 20'
CM	19	Alberto Quintero
LM	11	Armando Cooper	(yellow card) 47'	(substituted off) 76'
CF	7	Blas Pérez	(yellow card) 6'	(substituted off) 75'
Substitutions:
MF	2	Miguel Camargo		(substituted on) 20'
FW	10	Luis Tejada		(substituted on) 75'
FW	16	Abdiel Arroyo		(substituted on) 76'
Manager:
(Colombia) Hernán Darío Gómez

Man of the Match:
Lionel Messi (Argentina)

Assistant referees:
Juan Zumba (El Salvador)
William Torres (El Salvador)
Fourth official:
Víctor Carrillo (Peru)
Fifth official:
Coty Carrera (Peru)

=== Chile vs Panama ===
The two teams had met in three previous occasions, the last being a friendly held at the Estadio Municipal Francisco Sánchez Rumoroso in Coquimbo in 2010, which Chile won 2–1.

June 14, 2016
8:00 p.m.

Chile	4–2	Panama
Vargas 15', 43'; Sánchez 50', 89'	Report (CONMEBOL); Report (CONCACAF)	Camargo 5'; Arroyo 75'

Lincoln Financial Field, Philadelphia, Pennsylvania
Attendance: 27,260
Referee: Roddy Zambrano (Ecuador)

Chile	Panama

GK	1	Claudio Bravo (c)
RB	4	Mauricio Isla	(yellow card) 90+2'
CB	17	Gary Medel		(substituted off) 90'
CB	18	Gonzalo Jara
LM	15	Jean Beausejour		(substituted off) 60'
CM	8	Arturo Vidal		(substituted off) 90'
CM	21	Marcelo Díaz
CM	20	Charles Aránguiz
RW	6	José Pedro Fuenzalida
CF	11	Eduardo Vargas
LW	7	Alexis Sánchez
Substitutions:
FW	22	Edson Puch		(substituted on) 60'
DF	3	Enzo Roco		(substituted on) 90'
MF	10	Pablo Hernández		(substituted on) 90'
Manager:
(Argentina) Juan Antonio Pizzi

GK	1	Jaime Penedo
RB	13	Adolfo Machado (c)
CB	3	Harold Cummings	(yellow card) 72'
CB	5	Roderick Miller
LB	17	Luis Henríquez
RM	2	Miguel Camargo	(yellow card) 52'
CM	6	Gabriel Gómez
CM	21	Amílcar Henríquez	(yellow card) 78'
LM	19	Alberto Quintero		(substituted off) 71'
CF	9	Roberto Nurse		(substituted off) 46'
CF	10	Luis Tejada		(substituted off) 46'
Substitutions:
FW	8	Gabriel Torres		(substituted on) 46'
FW	16	Abdiel Arroyo		(substituted on) 46'
MF	18	Ricardo Buitrago		(substituted on) 71'
Manager:
(Colombia) Hernán Darío Gómez

Man of the Match:
Eduardo Vargas (Chile)

Assistant referees:
Byron Romero (Ecuador)
Luis Vera (Ecuador)
Fourth official:
Wilmar Roldán (Colombia)
Fifth official:
John Alexander León (Colombia)

=== Argentina vs Bolivia ===
The two teams had met in thirty-six previous occasions, the last being a 2018 FIFA World Cup qualifying match held at the Estadio Mario Alberto Kempes in Córdoba in early 2016, which Argentina won 2–0. Their last Copa América meeting was in the 2011 group stage, where the match finished as a 1–1 draw.

June 14, 2016
10:00 p.m.

Argentina	3–0	Bolivia
Lamela 13'; Lavezzi 15'; Cuesta 32'	Report (CONMEBOL); Report (CONCACAF)

CenturyLink Field, Seattle, Washington
Attendance: 45,753
Referee: Víctor Carrillo (Peru)

Argentina	Bolivia

GK	1	Sergio Romero (c)
RB	3	Facundo Roncaglia
CB	17	Nicolás Otamendi		(substituted off) 75'
CB	15	Víctor Cuesta	(yellow card) 90+2'
LB	13	Ramiro Funes Mori
CM	19	Éver Banega	(yellow card) 27'	(substituted off) 46'
CM	5	Matías Kranevitter
RW	22	Ezequiel Lavezzi
AM	18	Erik Lamela
LW	11	Sergio Agüero
CF	9	Gonzalo Higuaín		(substituted off) 46'
Substitutions:
MF	6	Lucas Biglia		(substituted on) 46'
FW	10	Lionel Messi		(substituted on) 46'
DF	2	Jonathan Maidana		(substituted on) 75'
Manager:
Gerardo Martino

GK	1	Carlos Lampe (c)
CB	13	Alejandro Meleán	(yellow card) 87'
CB	22	Edward Zenteno	(yellow card) 12'
CB	5	Nelson Cabrera
RWB	2	Erwin Saavedra
LWB	3	Luis Alberto Gutiérrez
RM	7	Juan Carlos Arce		(substituted off) 46'
CM	8	Martin Smedberg-Dalence		(substituted off) 85'
CM	15	Pedro Azogue
LM	10	Jhasmani Campos	(yellow card) 81'
CF	9	Yasmani Duk		(substituted off) 24'
Substitutions:
DF	4	Diego Bejarano		(substituted on) 24'
MF	16	Cristhian Machado		(substituted on) 46'
MF	19	Carmelo Algarañaz		(substituted on) 85'
Manager:
Julio César Baldivieso

Man of the Match:
Ezequiel Lavezzi (Argentina)

Assistant referees:
Jorge Yupanqui (Peru)
Coty Carrera (Peru)
Fourth official:
Wilton Sampaio (Brazil)
Fifth official:
Octavio Jara (Costa Rica)
