= Loaeza =

Loaeza is a surname. Notable people with the surname include:

- Guadalupe Loaeza (born 1946), Mexican writer and journalist
- Soledad Loaeza (born 1950), Mexican academic and writer

== See also ==
- Loaiza
