= Loaiza =

Loaiza is a surname. Notable people with the surname include:

- Armando Loaiza (1943-2016), Bolivian politician
- Carlos Silva Loaiza (1919–2009), Colombian footballer
- Elizabeth Loaiza Junca (born 1989), Colombian model
- Esteban Loaiza (born 1971), Mexican baseball pitcher
- Henry Loaiza-Ceballos, Colombian drug dealer
- Herman Loaiza (born 1956), Colombian racing cyclist
- Juan Carlos Loaiza, Chilean rodeo horse rider
- Karly Loaiza (born 1994) American singer and songwriter
- Miguel Loaiza (born 1983), Bolivian footballer
