= Gustavo Caamaño =

Argentine footballer (born 1979)

Personal information
- Full name: Gustavo Martín Caamaño
- Date of birth: May 27, 1979 (age 47)
- Place of birth: Argentina
- Height: 1.76 m (5 ft 9 1/2 in)
- Position: Defender

Senior career*
| Years | Team | Apps | (Gls) |
| 2008–2009 | CAI | 39 | (3) |
| 2009–2010 | Aldosivi | 7 | (1) |
| 2010–2011 | Oriente Petrolero | 38 | (4) |
| 2011–2013 | Guillermo Brown | 56 | (2) |
| 2013-XXX | Racing de Trelew | | |
- * Club domestic league appearances and goals as of May 17, 2011

Gustavo Caamaño (born May 27, 1979) is an Argentine football defender.

Caamaño began his football career at CIA, scoring on his debut. In 2009, he joined club Aldosivi of the Primera B Nacional. In January 2010 he was transferred to Bolivian side Oriente Petrolero under a one-year contract.
