= Anselmo de Almeida =

Brazilian footballer (born 1980)

Personal information
- Date of birth: 18 August 1980 (age 46)
- Place of birth: Leopoldina, Brazil
- Height: 1.80 m (5 ft 11 in)
- Position: Defender

Senior career*
| Years | Team | Apps | (Gls) |
| 2005–2008 | Juventud de Las Piedras | 83 | (6) |
| 2008–2009 | Deportivo Pereira | 31 | (2) |
| 2009–2010 | Independiente Medellín | 36 | (3) |
| 2011–2012 | Atlético Junior | 33 | (3) |
| 2013 | Deportivo Pereira | 14 | (1) |
- * Club domestic league appearances and goals as of 25 May 2013

Anselmo de Almeida (born 18 August 1980) is a retired Brazilian footballer who played as a defender.

== Honours ==
Junior

- Categoría Primera A (1): 2011-II
