= Michael Etulain =

Uruguayan football player (born 1980)

Personal information
- Full name: Michael Etulain Castro
- Date of birth: October 31, 1980 (age 46)
- Place of birth: Montevideo, Uruguay
- Height: 1.93 m (6 ft 4 in)
- Position: Goalkeeper

Senior career*
Years	Team	Apps	(Gls)
1999–2004	Danubio	21	(0)
2005	Oriente Petrolero	26	(0)
2006	Unión de Santa Fe	13	(0)
2006	Defensor Sporting		
2007–2008	Portimonense	19	(0)
2009–2010	Ferro Carril Oeste	55	(0)
2010	Miramar Misiones	10	(0)
2011	Oriente Petrolero	25	(0)
2011–2012	Talleres (C)	19	(0)
2012–2013	Sarmiento	12	(0)
2014	Patronato		
2015	Cúcuta Deportivo	14	(0)
2016–2018	Danubio	7	(0)
- * Club domestic league appearances and goals

Michael Etulain Castro (born October 31, 1980) is a Uruguayan football player, who plays for Danubio FC. He was born in Montevideo, Uruguay. He plays as a goalkeeper.

== Teams ==
- (Uruguay) Danubio 1999–2004
- (Bolivia) Oriente Petrolero 2005
- (Argentina) Unión de Santa Fe 2006
- (Uruguay) Defensor Sporting 2006
- (Portugal) Portimonense 2007–2008
- (Argentina) Ferro Carril Oeste 2009
- (Uruguay) Miramar Misiones 2010
- (Bolivia) Oriente Petrolero 2011
- (Argentina) Talleres de Cordoba 2011–2012
- (Argentina) Sarmiento 2012–2013
