= Mauricio Saucedo =

Bolivian football midfielder (born 1985)

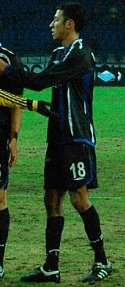

Personal information
- Full name: Mauricio Saucedo Guardia
- Date of birth: August 14, 1985 (age 41)
- Place of birth: Santa Cruz de la Sierra, Bolivia
- Height: 1.86 m (6 ft 1 in)
- Positions: Attacking midfielder; second striker

Youth career
- Tahuichi Academy

Senior career*
Years	Team	Apps	(Gls)
2003	Bolívar	0	(0)
2003	Iberoamericana	12	(1)
2004	La Paz	9	(0)
2005–2008	San José	82	(17)
2009	Universitario de Sucre	31	(4)
2010	Chornomorets Odesa	13	(3)
2010–2011	Oriente Petrolero	34	(16)
2011	Vitória	1	(0)
2012	Bragantino	4	(0)
2012–2013	The Strongest	24	(1)
2013–2015	Universitario de Sucre	68	(24)
2015–2016	Oriente Petrolero	23	(2)
2016	Wilstermann	15	(1)
2017	Blooming	19	(1)
2018	Sport Boys	3	(0)
2020	Real Santa Cruz	9	(2)

International career
2008–2012	Bolivia	17	(0)
- * Club domestic league appearances and goals

Mauricio Saucedo Guardia (born August 14, 1985, in Santa Cruz de la Sierra) is a Bolivian former football midfielder. He was also a member of the Bolivia national team.

== Club career ==
Saucedo developed his skills at Tahuichi Academy. In 2003, at age 18 he reached professional football when he signed for Bolívar, although he made his official debut in the Bolivian league with Iberoamericana later that year. In 2004, he joined La Paz F.C. but his appearances were sporadic, mainly coming off the bench.

The following year he transferred to San José, and his career finally began to sprout. In short time, Saucedo became one of the most valuable young prospects in the country and helped the club in obtaining the 2007 Clausura title.

In January 2009, he was signed by Universitario de Sucre along with other important players to fortify the squad before facing Copa Libertadores.

In February 2010, he travelled to Ukraine and signed for first division club FC Chornomorets Odesa. By August of that year, Saucedo returned to Bolivia and joined hometown club Oriente Petrolero. During his spell at the club he won the 2010 Clausura.

In July 2011, he was signed by Portuguese club Vitória S.C. After making only one appearance since the beginning of the season, he criticized manager Rui Vitória for not giving him enough playing time which led to the club releasing the player on the December 16, 2011.

He was signed by Brazilian club Bragantino on January 5, 2012. Following an unsuccessful stint Saucedo found himself signing for The Strongest in May of that year. After a season with the atigrados, Saucedo moved to Universitario de Sucre for the second time in his career and helped the club obtain the 2014 Clausura. On June 18, 2015, Saucedo returned to Oriente Petrolero with the illusion of winning another championship for the refineros.

=== Retirement and later career ===
In January 2020, Saucedo signed for Real Santa Cruz. However, an injury forced him to retire from football.

In May 2021, Saucedo switched from football to politics when he was appointed Minister of Sports of the municipality of Santa Cruz de la Sierra.

== Club titles ==
Season	Club	Title
2007 (C)	San José	Liga de Fútbol Profesional Boliviano
2010 (C)	Oriente Petrolero	Liga de Fútbol Profesional Boliviano
2014 (C)	Universitario de Sucre	Liga de Fútbol Profesional Boliviano
