= Cristian Cuffaro Russo =

Argentine footballer

Personal information
- Full name: Cristián Javier Cuffaro Russo
- Date of birth: May 18, 1988 (age 38)
- Place of birth: Rosario, Argentina
- Height: 1.81 m (5 ft 11 in)
- Position: Defender

Senior career*
Years	Team	Apps	(Gls)
2009–2010	Rosario Central		
2011	Oriente Petrolero	6	(1)
2011	Guabirá	11	(0)
2012	ESPOLI	9	(1)
2012–2013	Huracán	25	(1)
2013	San Martín	9	(0)
2015–2016	Central Córdoba	50	(4)
2016–2018	Deportivo Armenio	38	(2)
- * Club domestic league appearances and goals

Cristián Javier Cuffaro Russo (born May 18, 1988) is an Argentine footballer who plays as a defender for Huracán de Comodoro Rivadavia in the Torneo Argentino "B" in Argentina. He is the son of the Argentine coach Ariel Cuffaro Russo.

== Teams ==
- Rosario Central 2009–2010
- Oriente Petrolero 2011
- Guabirá 2011–2012
- Huracán de Comodoro Rivadavia 2012–present

== Sources ==
- Cristian Cuffaro Russo at BDFA (in Spanish)
- Cristian Cuffaro Russo at Soccerway (archived)
