= Luis Cardozo =

Paraguayan footballer (born 1988)

Personal information
- Full name: Luis Carlos Cardozo Espillaga
- Date of birth: 10 October 1988 (age 38)
- Place of birth: Asunción, Paraguay
- Height: 1.80 m (5 ft 11 in)
- Positions: Centre back; full back

Team information
- Current team: Recoleta
- Number: 3

Youth career
- 2000–2002: 30 de Abril
- 2002–2007: Cerro Porteño

Senior career*
Years	Team	Apps	(Gls)
2007–2015	Cerro Porteño	215	(10)
2014	→ Morelia (loan)	18	(0)
2015–2024	Libertad	182	(3)
2025–	Recoleta	13	(0)

International career^{‡}
2006–2008	Paraguay U20	19	(2)
2011–	Paraguay	8	(0)
- * Club domestic league appearances and goals as of 10 April 2025 ‡ National team caps and goals as of 1 July 2017

Luis Carlos Cardozo (born 10 October 1988) is a Paraguayan professional footballer who plays as a centre back for Paraguayan Primera División club Recoleta.

On 19 July 2015, Paraguayan newspaper ExtraPRESS named Cardozo one of the most expensive players in Paraguay.
