= Nelson Cabrera (footballer, born 1983) =

Paraguayan footballer

Personal information
- Full name: Nelson David Cabrera Báez
- Date of birth: 22 April 1983 (age 43)
- Place of birth: Itauguá, Paraguay
- Height: 1.91 m (6 ft 3 in)
- Position: Centre back

Youth career
- Olimpia Asunción

Senior career*
Years	Team	Apps	(Gls)
2004–2005	Olimpia Asunción	24	(0)
2005–2008	Cerro Porteño	107	(18)
2009–2012	Colo-Colo	23	(1)
2009–2010	→ CFR Cluj (loan)	5	(0)
2012	Chongqing Lifan	21	(5)
2012–2017	Bolívar	131	(12)
2017–2018	Sportivo Luqueño	20	(2)
2019–2023	Always Ready	106	(15)
2023	Nacional Potosí	8	(0)
Total		445	(53)

International career
2007	Paraguay	1	(0)
2016	Bolivia	5	(0)
- * Club domestic league appearances and goals

Nelson David Cabrera Báez (Spanish pronunciation: [nelsondaˈβið kaˈβɾeɾa]; (Note: In isolation, Nelson and David are pronounced [ˈnelson] and [daˈβið] respectively.) born 22 April 1983) is a former footballer who played as a defender. Born in Paraguay, he represented the Paraguay national football team once in a friendly before naturalizing as a Bolivian citizen and switching to represent Bolivia internationally.

== Career ==
Cabrera started his career at Olimpia Asunción and moved to rivals Cerro Porteño in 2005. There he won two championships and was team captain from 2007 to 2008. He was then transferred to CSD Colo Colo of Chile for $1,000,000. In the 2009–2010 season he played for CFR Cluj of Romania, where he won the National League and played in the UEFA Europa League.

Cabrera was born and raised in Paraguay and he represented their national team in a friendly match in 2007. However, later in his career he played in Bolivia, gained their nationality and debuted officially for the Bolivia national football team in 2016. FIFA regulations required players switching nationalities at the time to have resided in the country for at least five years, but Cabrera only had for four. He was subsequently found to be ineligible by FIFA resulting in forfeiture of the preliminary 2018 FIFA World Cup qualification games between Bolivia and Peru on 1 September 2016 and between Chile and Bolivia five days later on 6 September 2016. Bolivia appealed the decision of FIFA to their own appeal committee, and then to the Court of Arbitration for Sport. It was not disputed that Cabrera was ineligible. However, Bolivia questioned FIFA's right to investigate and argued that a protest must be submitted within an hour of the match in question. Both appeals were dismissed.

The investigation on Cabrera's eligibility was requested by the Chilean Football Federation; however, this eventually backfired for Chile, as Peru, who also benefitted from the investigation's outcome, would qualify for the intercontinental play-offs against New Zealand, eliminating Chile by merely a narrow goal difference. That is because Peru got the third valuable point after they lost to Bolivia earlier while Chile, who drew Bolivia, only got two. Cabrera celebrated Chile's elimination by tweeting "God knows what He is doing and His times are perfect," followed by an image indicating that Chile would have qualified to the play-offs had the investigation never occurred.

Cabrera announced his retirement in March 2024, after his father died.

== Honours ==
Cerro Porteño

- Paraguayan Primera División: 2005

Colo-Colo

- Chilean Primera División: 2009 Clausura

CFR Cluj

- Romanian League: 2009–10
- Romanian Cup: 2009–10

Club Bolivar

- Bolivian First Division: 2013 Clausura, 2014 Apertura, 2015 Clausura
