= Pedro Azogue =

Bolivian footballer (born 1994)

Personal information
- Full name: Pedro Jesús Azogue Rojas
- Date of birth: 6 December 1994 (age 31)
- Place of birth: Santa Cruz de la Sierra, Bolivia
- Height: 1.76 m (5 ft 9 in)
- Position: Attacking midfielder

Team information
- Current team: Nacional Potosí
- Number: 18

Youth career
- Oriente Petrolero

Senior career*
Years	Team	Apps	(Gls)
2011–2017	Oriente Petrolero	127	(8)
2018–2020	Bolívar	35	(0)
2021	Club Atlético Palmaflor	27	(0)
2022	Royal Pari	28	(0)
2023	Real Tomayapo	29	(3)
2024–	Nacional Potosí	52	(2)

International career^{‡}
2012–	Bolivia	16	(0)
- * Club domestic league appearances and goals as of 30 December 2025 ‡ National team caps and goals as of 20 August 2017

Pedro Jesús Azogue Rojas (born 6 December 1994) is a Bolivian professional footballer who plays as an attacking midfielder for Nacional Potosí.

== International career ==
He also plays for the Bolivia's U-20 team where he is the team's captain. As of June 2016, he has capped 4 FIFA World Cup qualification matches.
