= Miguel Loaiza =

Bolivian footballer (born 1983)

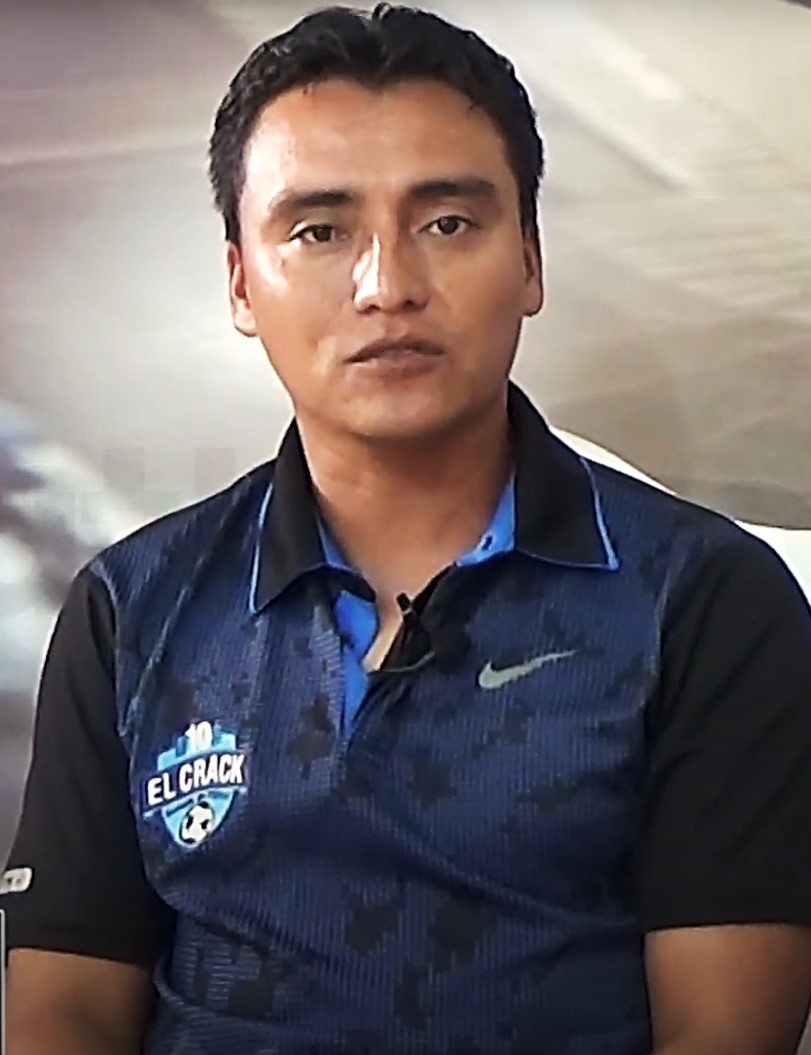

Personal information
- Full name: Miguel Oswaldo Loaiza Tardio
- Date of birth: 13 January 1983 (age 43)
- Place of birth: Santa Cruz de la Sierra, Bolivia
- Height: 1.65 m (5 ft 5 in)
- Position: Midfielder

Team information
- Current team: Royal Pari

Senior career*
Years	Team	Apps	(Gls)
2001	Bolívar	0	(0)
2002–2006	Real Potosí	148	(28)
2007	Universitario	34	(4)
2008–2011	Real Potosí	54	(10)
2011–2012	San José	38	(9)
2012–2013	Blooming	56	(3)
2014–2015	San José	30	(5)
2015	Real Potosí	2	(0)
2016–	Royal Pari		

International career^{‡}
2011	Bolivia	1	(0)
- * Club domestic league appearances and goals as of 8 December 2013 ‡ National team caps and goals as of October 12, 2013

Miguel Oswaldo Loaiza Tardio (born 13 January 1983 in Santa Cruz de la Sierra) is a Bolivian footballer who plays for Real Potosí as a midfielder.

== Club career ==
Nicknamed Micky, his previous clubs include Bolívar, Real Potosí in two periods, Universitario de Sucre, San José and Blooming.

== International career ==
Loaiza made his debut for Bolivia in a March 2011 friendly match against Panama, his sole international game.
