= Luis Alberto Gutiérrez =

Bolivian footballer (born 1985)

Personal information
- Full name: Luis Alberto Gutiérrez Herrera
- Date of birth: January 15, 1985 (age 41)
- Place of birth: Santa Cruz de la Sierra, Bolivia
- Height: 1.80 m (5 ft 11 in)
- Position: Left back

Senior career*
| Years | Team | Apps | (Gls) |
| 2004–2012 | Oriente Petrolero | 232 | (8) |
| 2009–2010 | → Ironi Kiryat Shmona (loan) | 16 | (0) |
| 2012 | → Bahia (loan) | 3 | (0) |
| 2012–2013 | Patronato de Paraná | 27 | (1) |
| 2013–2015 | Bolivar | 48 | (0) |
| 2015–2016 | Ironi Kiryat Shmona | 28 | (0) |
| 2016–2021 | Bolivar | 57 | (3) |
| 2022 | Royal Pari | 35 | (0) |
| 2023 | Oriente Petrolero | 13 | (0) |

International career^{‡}
| 2007–2017 | Bolivia | 44 | (0) |
- * Club domestic league appearances and goals as of August 31, 2009 ‡ National team caps and goals as of September 8, 2009

Luis Alberto Gutiérrez Herrera (born January 15, 1985, in Santa Cruz de la Sierra) is a Bolivian former footballer who played as a defender.

== Club career ==
Gutiérrez began playing professionally for Oriente Petrolero in 2004. He spent time on loan at Israeli side Ironi Kiryat Shmona in 2009–10 and Brazilian team Bahia in 2012.

== International career ==
Gutiérrez made his debut for the Bolivia national team in 2007 as made appearances as member of the squad during the 2011 Copa América.

== Honours ==
Hapoel Kiryat Shmona

- Israel Super Cup: 2015
