= Alejandro Meleán =

American-born Bolivian footballer (born 1987)

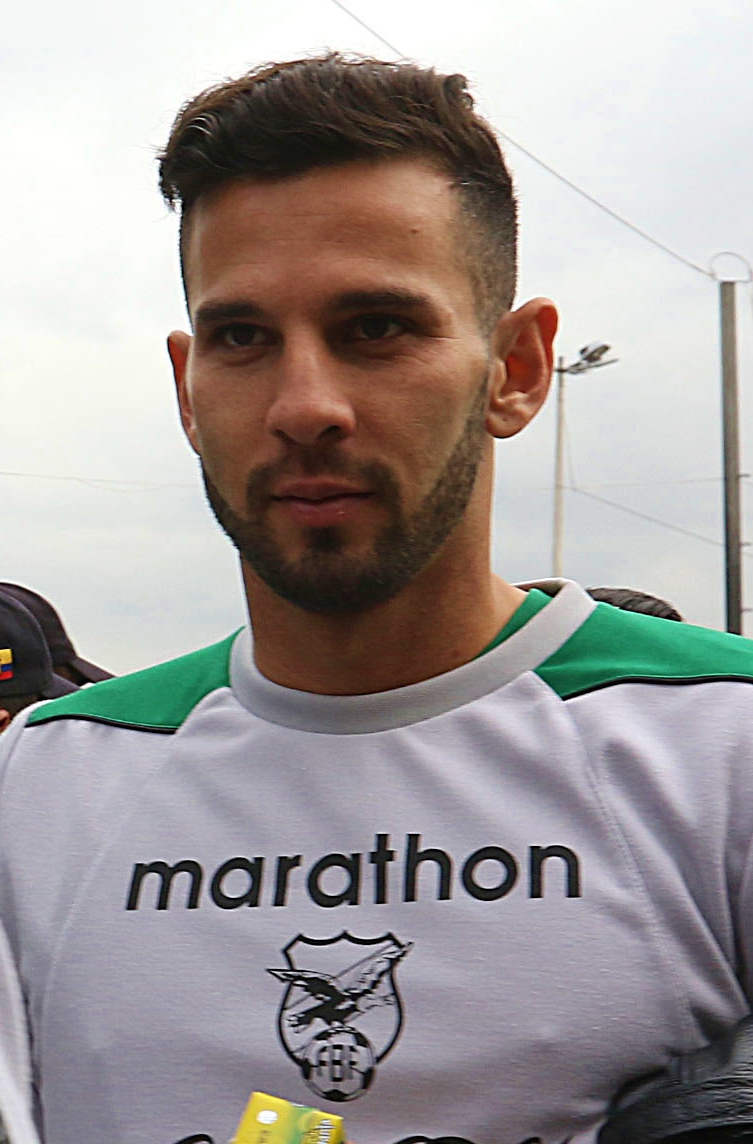

Personal information
- Full name: Alejandro Meleán Villarroel
- Date of birth: June 16, 1987 (age 39)
- Place of birth: Miami, Florida, United States
- Height: 1.83 m (6 ft 0 in)
- Position: Defensive midfielder

Youth career
- 2005–2008: Holy Cross Crusaders

Senior career*
Years	Team	Apps	(Gls)
2010	La Paz	37	(2)
2011–2016	Oriente Petrolero	180	(31)
2016–2017	Sport Boys	37	(1)
2017–2021	Wilstermann	111	(5)
2022–2024	Guabirá	87	(7)
2025	Oriente Petrolero	22	(0)

International career^{‡}
2012–2017	Bolivia	16	(0)
- * Club domestic league appearances and goals as of 30 December 2025 ‡ National team caps and goals as of 27 March 2018

Alejandro Meleán Villarroel (born June 16, 1987) is an American-born Bolivian former professional football player who played as a defensive midfielder.

== Club career ==
=== Early life ===
Melean attended Palmer Trinity School in Miami, where he played soccer and graduated in 2005. Later Meleán enrolled at the College of the Holy Cross in Worcester, MA after high school. During his four years with the Holy Cross Crusaders, Meleán was named all-Patriot League Conference twice and all Mid-Atlantic in his final year. Upon graduation, Meleán attempted to trial with numerous MLS squads, but after not finding any success, he returned to his native Miami.

=== Move to Bolivia ===
While home in Miami, Meleán secured trials with clubs in Bolivia. After a successful trial with Blooming, Meleán was offered a contract. Unhappy with terms of the contract, Meleán decided to join La Paz. His performances with La Paz garnered interest from then champions, Oriente Petrolero.

Meleán joined Oriente Petrolero in 2011 as cover for the club ahead of their 2011 Copa Libertadores campaign.

== International career ==
Meleán made his debut for Bolivia in an October 2012 FIFA World Cup qualification match against Uruguay and has, as of 20 June 2016, earned a total of 15 caps, scoring no goals.
