= Edward Zenteno =

Bolivian footballer (born 1984)

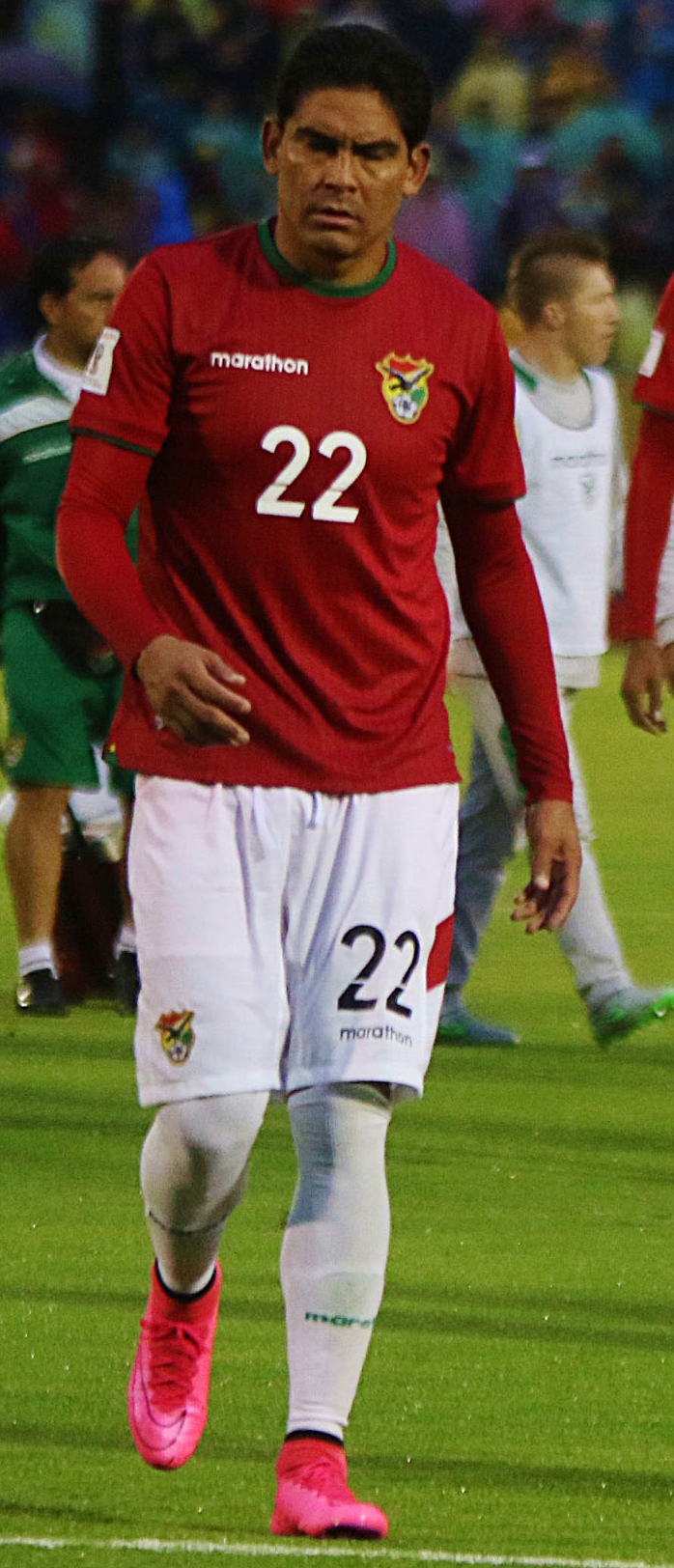
- Edward Zenteno in 2015

Personal information
- Full name: Edward Mauro Zenteno Álvarez
- Date of birth: 5 December 1984 (age 41)
- Place of birth: Cochabamba, Bolivia
- Height: 1.82 m (6 ft 0 in)
- Position: Centre-back

Team information
- Current team: Wilstermann

Youth career
- Wilstermann

Senior career*
Years	Team	Apps	(Gls)
2003–2006	Wilstermann	98	(0)
2007–2012	Aurora	33	(9)
2012–2020	Wilstermann	255	(22)
2021–2022	Aurora	59	(3)

International career
2005–2019	Bolivia	37	(0)

Managerial career
- 2025: Aurora (assistant)
- 2025: Aurora (interim)
- 2026–: Wilstermann
- * Club domestic league appearances and goals

Edward Mauro Zenteno Álvarez (Spanish pronunciation: [ˈeðwaɾð senˈteno]; born 5 December 1984) is a Bolivian football coach and former player who played as a central defender. He is the current assistant manager of Aurora.
