= Yasmani Duk =

Bolivian football striker (born 1988)

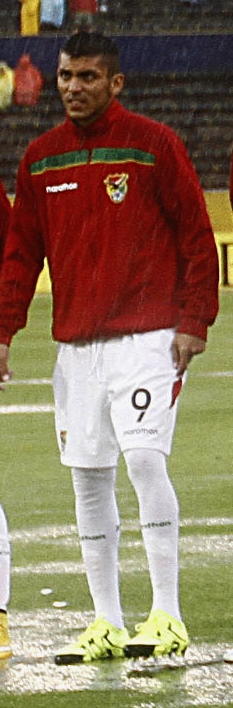
- Duk in 2015

Personal information
- Full name: Yasmani Georges Duk Arandia
- Date of birth: 1 March 1988 (age 38)
- Place of birth: Santa Cruz de la Sierra, Bolivia
- Height: 1.79 m (5 ft 10 in)
- Position: Forward

Senior career*
Years	Team	Apps	(Gls)
2010–2015	Oriente Petrolero	74	(22)
2012–2013	→ La Paz (loan)	38	(7)
2015–2017	Sport Boys	14	(5)
2016	→ New York Cosmos (loan)	12	(2)
2017	Al-Ettifaq	2	(0)
2017	Sport Boys	15	(2)
2018	Oriente Petrolero	22	(3)
2019	San José	9	(1)
2019	Sport Boys	14	(8)
2020	Aurora	7	(1)
2020	Deportivo FATIC	0	(0)
2021	Gran Mamoré	0	(0)

International career
2015–	Bolivia	15	(1)
- * Club domestic league appearances and goals as of 17:41, 31 May 2020 (UTC)

Yasmani Georges Duk Arandia (born 1 March 1988) is a Bolivian professional footballer who plays as a striker.

== International career ==
Duk was convened for the first time to the Bolivia national team in front of Colombia on 22 March 2013. Duk started all three group stage matches for Bolivia at the Copa America Centenario.

Duk earned his first cap for the Bolivia national team and scored his first international goal on 17 November 2015 against Paraguay in the 2018 FIFA World Cup qualification. From 2013 to 2015, he took the pitch for Oriente Petrolero of Bolivia's top flight, netting 21 times in 61 appearances for the four-time league champions.

The 27-year-old No. 9 has competed professionally in his home country for six years, mostly with Oriente Petrolero. He scored seven goals in 38 appearances on loan to La Paz F.C. from 2012 to 2013, and joined Sport Boys Warnes, his most recent club, in 2015. With Duk Sport Boys captured its first Torneo Apertura title, qualifying for the 2017 Copa Libertadores.

Duk signed with Club San José for the 2019 season. In January 2020, he moved to Club Aurora.

=== International goals ===
Scores and results list Bolivia's goal tally first

No.	Date	Venue	Opponent	Score	Result	Competition
1	17 November 2015	Estadio Defensores del Chaco, Asunción, Paraguay	Paraguay	1–0	1–2	2018 FIFA World Cup qualification
