= Fernando Saucedo =

Bolivian footballer (born 1990)

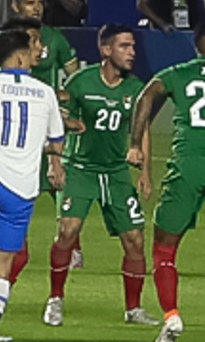
- Saucedo with Bolivia at the 2019 Copa América

Personal information
- Full name: Fernando Javier Saucedo Pereyra
- Date of birth: March 15, 1990 (age 36)
- Place of birth: Santa Cruz de la Sierra, Bolivia
- Height: 1.73 m (5 ft 8 in)
- Position: Midfielder

Team information
- Current team: Always Ready
- Number: 20

Youth career
- 2005–2009: Oriente Petrolero

Senior career*
Years	Team	Apps	(Gls)
2010–2014	Oriente Petrolero	131	(8)
2015	Guabirá	16	(4)
2015–2019	Wilstermann	157	(14)
2020–2022	Always Ready	47	(4)
2022–2023	The Strongest	39	(5)
2023–2024	Bolívar	52	(8)
2025–	Always Ready	39	(12)

International career^{‡}
2016–	Bolivia	26	(1)
- * Club domestic league appearances and goals as of 23:27, 1 July 2024 (UTC) ‡ National team caps and goals as of 20:36, 25 March 2024 (UTC)

Fernando Javier Saucedo Pereyra (born March 15, 1990) is a Bolivian professional footballer who plays as a midfielder for Always Ready and the Bolivia national team.

== Club career ==
He began developing his football skills at age thirteen. In 2001, Saucedo began his professional career with hometown club Oriente Petrolero Academy after being spotted by Víctor Hugo Antelo, the team manager at that time. At the beginning of 2005 he started playing for Oriente B where he showed good football skill. In 2010, he was called by Gustavo Quinteros to join the first squad. He made his debut against Club Aurora in The Torneo Apertura; his first goal came in a match against Real Mamoré at the 80th minute.

== International career ==
Saucedo made his international debut for Bolivia on 30 March 2016 against Argentina during the 2018 FIFA World Cup qualification.

== Career statistics ==
=== International ===
As of match played 1 July 2024

Appearances and goals by national team and year
National team	Year	Apps	Goals
Bolivia	2016	3	0
Bolivia	2017	1	0
Bolivia	2018	1	0
Bolivia	2019	5	0
Bolivia	2021	6	1
Bolivia	2022	4	0
Bolivia	2023	1	0
Bolivia	2024	5	0
Total		26	1

As of match played 2 September 2021. Bolivia score listed first, score column indicates score after each Saucedo goal.

List of international goals scored by Fernando Saucedo
No.	Date	Venue	Cap	Opponent	Score	Result	Competition
1	2 September 2021	Estadio Hernando Siles, La Paz, Bolivia	11	Colombia	1–1	1–1	2022 FIFA World Cup qualification
