= Marvin Bejarano =

Bolivian footballer (born 1988)

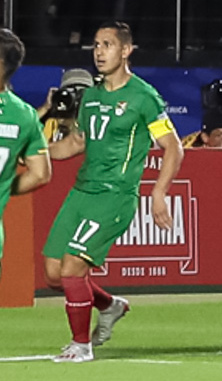
- Bejarano with Bolivia at the 2019 Copa América

Personal information
- Full name: Marvin Orlando Bejarano Jiménez
- Date of birth: 6 March 1988 (age 38)
- Place of birth: Tarija, Bolivia
- Height: 1.68 m (5 ft 6 in)
- Position: Left wing back

Team information
- Current team: Real Tomayapo
- Number: 17

Senior career*
Years	Team	Apps	(Gls)
2006	Unión Tarija	16	(0)
2007–2011	Universitario de Sucre	119	(12)
2011–2015	Oriente Petrolero	132	(4)
2016–2020	The Strongest	150	(11)
2021–2023	Royal Pari	87	(2)
2024	Wilstermann	35	(1)
2025–	Real Tomayapo	29	(1)

International career^{‡}
2009–	Bolivia	40	(0)
- * Club domestic league appearances and goals as of 30 December 2025 ‡ National team caps and goals as of 01:46, 3 January 2021 (UTC)

Marvin Orlando Bejarano Jiménez (born 6 March 1988) is a Bolivian professional footballer who plays as a left wing back for Real Tomayapo in Bolivian Primera División.

== Club career ==
Bejarano has previously played for Unión Tarija, Universitario de Sucre and Oriente Petrolero. Bejarano began his career at 18 in the club of his hometown, Unión Tarija during the 2006 season. He signed for Universitario de Sucre in 2007. He won the 2008 Bolivia Championship with them. He remained at Universitario de Sucre for four seasons, from 2007 to 2011. During his time with Universitario de Sucre, he won his first title, winning the 2008 Bolivia championship. His good performances in the league and Copa Sudamericana 2010 increased his interest from other Bolivian clubs and ended up signing with Oriente Petrolero in 2011. During his first season with Oriente Petrolero, Polish club Wisła Krakow made an offer for Bejarano, which Bejarano accepted; however, the defender suffered a serious injury in training and chose to return to Bolivia causing the deal to fall through.

== International career ==
Bejarano has been capped at international level by the Bolivia national team. He got his first call up for the Bolivia national team in 2009.

== Career statistics ==
As of 24 November 2019

Appearances and goals by club, season and competition
Club	Season	League			Cup		Continental		Total	
Club	Season	Division	Apps	Goals	Apps	Goals	Apps	Goals	Apps	Goals
Universitario de Sucre	2010	Bolivian Primera División	39	2	–		–		39	2
Universitario de Sucre	2011	Bolivian Primera División	18	2	–		–		18	2
Universitario de Sucre	Total		57	4	–		–		57	4
Oriente Petrolero	2011–12	Bolivian Primera División	35	2	–		–		35	2
Oriente Petrolero	2012–13	Bolivian Primera División	35	0	–		–		35	0
Oriente Petrolero	2013–14	Bolivian Primera División	33	1	–		–		33	1
Oriente Petrolero	2014–15	Bolivian Primera División	29	1	–		–		29	1
Oriente Petrolero	2015–16	Bolivian Primera División	25	2	–		–		25	2
Oriente Petrolero	Total		157	6	–		–		157	6
The Strongest	2016–17	Bolivian Primera División	51	4	–		–		51	4
The Strongest	2018	Bolivian Primera División	41	3	–		–		41	3
The Strongest	2019	Bolivian Primera División	38	4	–		–		38	4
The Strongest	Total		130	11	–		–		130	11
Career total			344	24	–		–		344	24

== Honours ==
Universitario de Sucre

- Liga de Fútbol Profesional Boliviano: 2008 Apertura
