= Wálter Veizaga =

Bolivian footballer (born 1988)

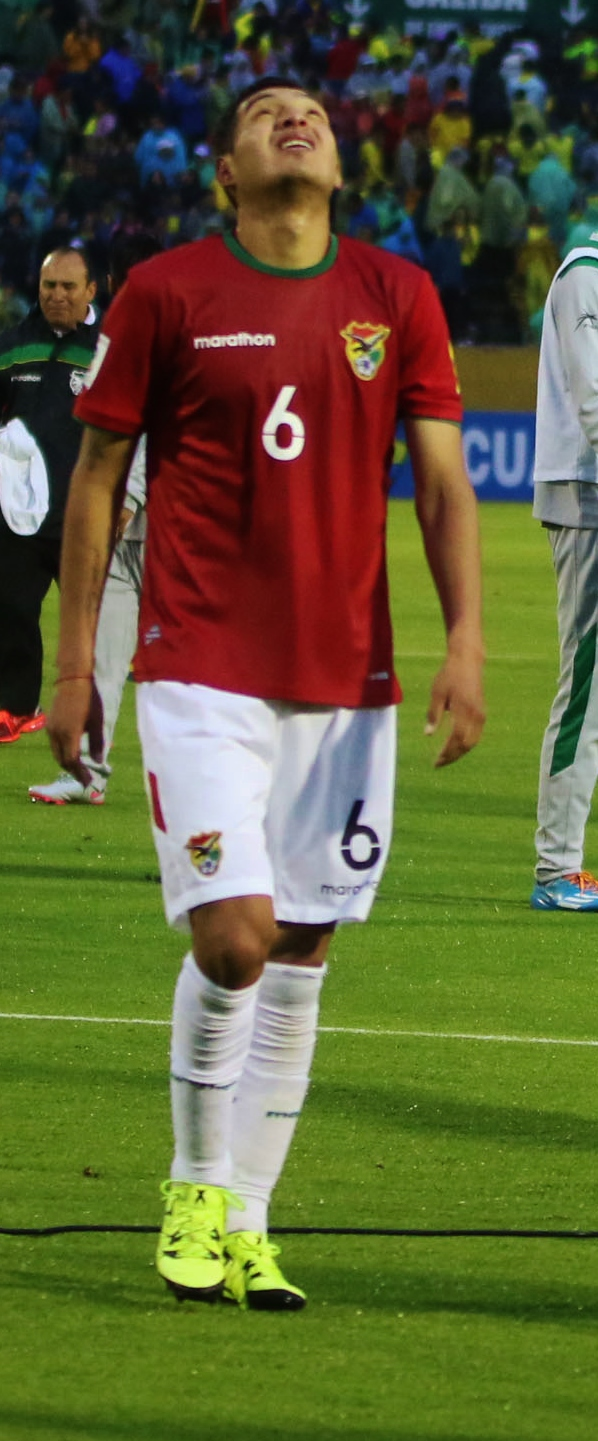

Personal information
- Full name: Wálter Veizaga Argote
- Date of birth: 24 July 1988 (age 38)
- Place of birth: Cochabamba, Bolivia
- Height: 1.79 m (5 ft 10 in)
- Position: Defensive midfielder

Team information
- Current team: Real Mizque
- Number: 16

Senior career*
Years	Team	Apps	(Gls)
2010	Wilstermann	42	(2)
2011–2012	Oriente Petrolero	22	(0)
2012–2020	The Strongest	268	(13)
2021	Real Tomayapo	29	(2)
2022	Universitario de Vinto	29	(0)
2023–	Real Mizque		

International career^{‡}
2010–2018	Bolivia	21	(0)
- * Club domestic league appearances and goals as of 20 October 2022 ‡ National team caps and goals as of 01:44, 3 January 2021 (UTC)

Wálter Veizaga (Spanish pronunciation: [ˈwalteɾ βejˈsaɣa]; born 22 April 1988) is a Bolivian footballer who played as a midfielder for Real Mizque.

== Club career ==
He started his career with Wilstermann in 2010. In 2011, he joined Oriente Petrolero and played 22 matches before joining The Strongest in 2012.

== International career ==
He made his debut in a 5–0 loss against Mexico.
