= Carlos Lampe =

Bolivian footballer (born 1987)

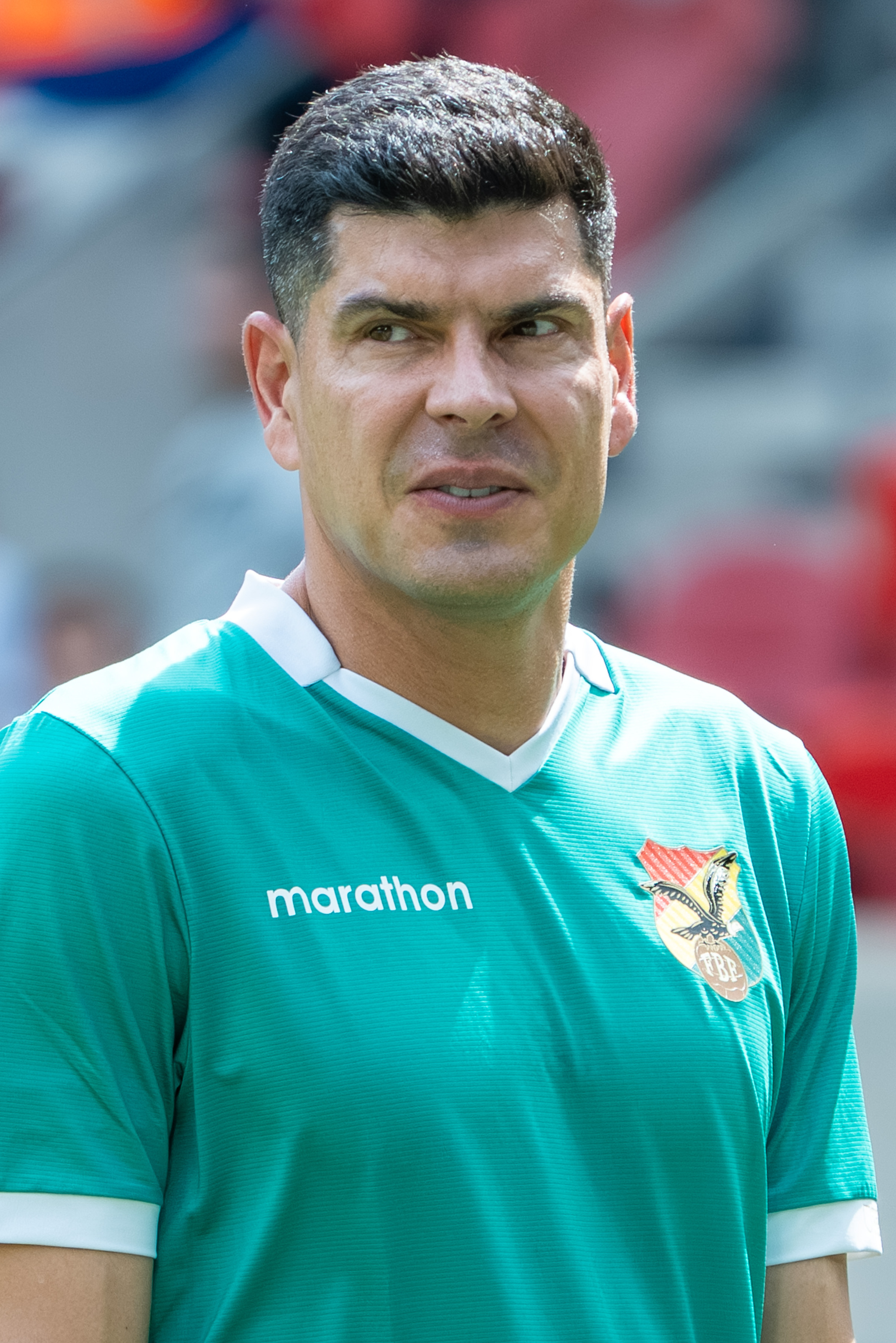
- Lampe with Bolivia in 2026

Personal information
- Full name: Carlos Emilio Lampe Porras
- Date of birth: March 17, 1987 (age 39)
- Place of birth: Santa Cruz de la Sierra, Bolivia
- Height: 1.92 m (6 ft 4 in)
- Position: Goalkeeper

Team information
- Current team: Bolívar
- Number: 1

Youth career
- 2004–2005: Blooming

Senior career*
Years	Team	Apps	(Gls)
2006	Universitario	0	(0)
2007	Bolívar	13	(0)
2008	Guabirá	31	(0)
2009–2010	Universitario	77	(0)
2011–2012	San José	61	(0)
2012	Bolívar	10	(0)
2013–2015	San José	83	(1)
2015–2016	Sport Boys Warnes	39	(0)
2016–2019	Huachipato	68	(0)
2018	→ Boca Juniors (loan)	0	(0)
2019	→ San José (loan)	10	(0)
2020–2021	Always Ready	31	(0)
2021–2022	Velez Sarfield	1	(0)
2022	Atlético Tucumán	24	(0)
2023–	Bolívar	84	(0)

International career^{‡}
2007	Bolivia U-20	4	(0)
2010–	Bolivia	65	(0)
- * Club domestic league appearances and goals as of 17 September 2026 ‡ National team caps and goals as of 03:00, 2 September 2026 (UTC)

Carlos Emilio Lampe Porras (born March 17, 1987) is a Bolivian professional footballer who plays as a goalkeeper for División Profesional club Bolívar and the Bolivia national team.

== Club career ==
During the 2010 season he was the first choice keeper for Universitario de Sucre, having played all six games in their journey through the 2010 version of the Copa Nissan Sudamericana, picking up the MVP award in a couple of matches. Lampe has also become a regular choice keeper for the Bolivian squad.

After a number of years abroad with Huachipato (Chile) and a brief stint with Boca Juniors (Argentina), in 2020 Lampe returned to Bolivian club football with Always Ready, winning the 2020 División de Fútbol Profesional, the first title in the club's history.

== International career ==
Lampe has been a Bolivian international since 2010, earning 64 caps. He has represented his country in FIFA World Cup qualification matches.

Lampe played for Bolivia in the 2007 U-20 South American Championship held in Paraguay. In 2009, he received his first call up to the senior national team for the 2010 World Cup qualifiers against Venezuela and Chile on June 6 and 10 respectively. However, the manager decided to bench him in both games. He made his full international debut for Bolivia on February 24, 2010, in a friendly against Mexico.

== Career statistics ==
=== International ===
As of match played 10 June 2026

Appearances and goals by national team and year
National team	Year	Apps	Goals
Bolivia	2010	3	0
Bolivia	2016	8	0
Bolivia	2017	8	0
Bolivia	2018	5	0
Bolivia	2019	5	0
Bolivia	2020	4	0
Bolivia	2021	14	0
Bolivia	2022	4	0
Bolivia	2023	2	0
Bolivia	2024	3	0
Bolivia	2025	6	0
Bolivia	2026	3	0
Total		65	0
