= Panama at the CONCACAF Gold Cup =

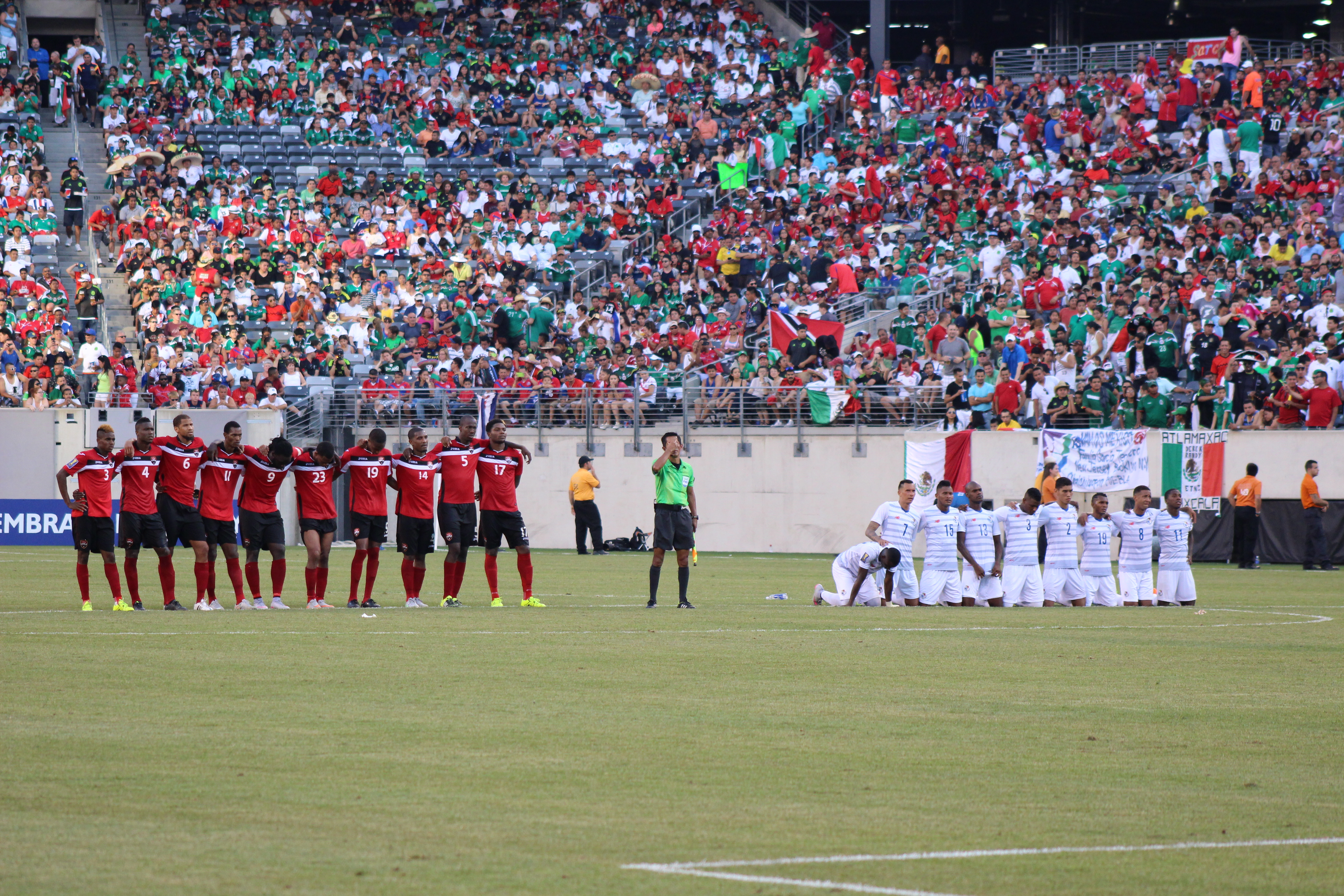
The teams of Trinidad and Tobago (red) and Panama (white) before their 2015 CONCACAF Gold Cup Quarter-Final. Panama won on penalties and finished 3rd in the tournament.

The CONCACAF Gold Cup is North America's major tournament in senior men's football and determines the continental champion. Until 1989, the tournament was known as CONCACAF Championship. It is currently held every two years. From 1996 to 2005, nations from other confederations have regularly joined the tournament as invitees. In earlier editions, the continental championship was held in different countries, but since the inception of the Gold Cup in 1991, the United States are constant hosts or co-hosts.

From 1973 to 1989, the tournament doubled as the confederation's World Cup qualification. CONCACAF's representative team at the FIFA Confederations Cup was decided by a play-off between the winners of the last two tournament editions in 2015 via the CONCACAF Cup, but was then discontinued along with the Confederations Cup.

Since the inaugural tournament in 1963, the Gold Cup was held 28 times and has been won by seven different nations, most often by Mexico (13 titles).

Although Panama was one of the nine teams which participated in the inaugural 1963 CONCACAF Championship, it took thirty years for them to make a second appearance in a continental tournament. However, they have continually participated since 2005 and consistently reached the knockout stage, playing three finals. They lost to the United States on penalties in 2005 and 0–1 in 2013, and lost 0–1 to Mexico in 2023.

In 2015, Panama finished third in the tournament, drawing all six matches 1–1 after normal time.

== Overall record ==
CONCACAF Championship & Gold Cup record
Year	Round	Position	Pld	W	D	L	GF	GA	Squad
(El Salvador) 1963	Group stage	6th	4	1	2	1	8	4	Squad
(Guatemala) 1965	Did not enter								
(Honduras) 1967	Did not qualify								
(Costa Rica) 1969	Did not qualify								
(Trinidad and Tobago) 1971	Did not enter								
(Haiti) 1973	Did not enter								
(Mexico) 1977	Did not qualify								
(Honduras) 1981
1985
1989
(United States) 1991	Did not enter								
(Mexico) (United States) 1993	Group stage	7th	3	0	1	2	3	8	Squad
(United States) 1996	Did not qualify								
(United States) 1998	Did not qualify								
(United States) 2000	Did not qualify								
(United States) 2002	Did not qualify								
(Mexico) (United States) 2003	Did not qualify								
(United States) 2005	Runners-up	2nd	6	2	3	1	7	6	Squad
(United States) 2007	Quarter-finals	6th	4	1	1	2	6	7	Squad
(United States) 2009	Quarter-finals	7th	4	1	1	2	7	5	Squad
(United States) 2011	Semi-finals	3rd	5	2	2	1	7	6	Squad
(United States) 2013	Runners-up	2nd	6	4	1	1	11	4	Squad
(Canada) (United States) 2015	Third place	3rd	6	0	5	1	6	7	Squad
(United States) 2017	Quarter-finals	5th	4	2	1	1	6	3	Squad
(Costa Rica) (Jamaica) (United States) 2019	Quarter-finals	7th	4	2	0	2	6	4	Squad
(United States) 2021	Group stage	9th	3	1	1	1	8	7	Squad
(Canada) (United States) 2023	Runners-up	2nd	6	3	2	1	11	6	Squad
(Canada) (United States) 2025	Quarter-finals	5th	4	3	1	0	11	4	Squad
Total	Runners-up	13/28	59	22	21	16	97	71	—

== Match overview ==
Tournament	Round	Opponent	Score	Venue
(El Salvador) 1963	Group stage	El Salvador	1–1	San Salvador
(El Salvador) 1963	Group stage	Guatemala	2–2	San Salvador
(El Salvador) 1963	Group stage	Honduras	0–1	San Salvador
(El Salvador) 1963	Group stage	Nicaragua	5–0	San Salvador
(Mexico) (United States) 1993	Group stage	Honduras	1–5	Dallas
(Mexico) (United States) 1993	Group stage	United States	1–2	Dallas
(Mexico) (United States) 1993	Group stage	Jamaica	1–1	Dallas
(United States) 2005	Group stage	Colombia	1–0	Miami
(United States) 2005	Group stage	Trinidad and Tobago	2–2	Miami
(United States) 2005	Group stage	Honduras	0–1	Miami
(United States) 2005	Quarter-finals	South Africa	1–1 (5–3 p)	Houston
(United States) 2005	Semi-finals	Colombia	3–2	East Rutherford
(United States) 2005	Final	United States	0–0 (1–3 p)	East Rutherford
(United States) 2007	Group stage	Honduras	3–2	East Rutherford
(United States) 2007	Group stage	Cuba	2–2	East Rutherford
(United States) 2007	Group stage	Mexico	0–1	Houston
(United States) 2007	Quarter-finals	United States	1–2	Foxboro
(United States) 2009	Group stage	Guadeloupe	1–2	Oakland
(United States) 2009	Group stage	Mexico	1–1	Houston
(United States) 2009	Group stage	Nicaragua	4–0	Glendale
(United States) 2009	Quarter-finals	United States	1–2 (a.e.t.)	Philadelphia
(United States) 2011	Group stage	Guadeloupe	3–2	Detroit
(United States) 2011	Group stage	United States	2–1	Tampa
(United States) 2011	Group stage	Canada	1–1	Kansas City
(United States) 2011	Quarter-finals	El Salvador	1–1 (5–3 p)	Washington, D.C.
(United States) 2011	Semi-finals	United States	0–1	Houston
(United States) 2013	Group stage	Mexico	2–1	Pasadena
(United States) 2013	Group stage	Martinique	1–0	Seattle
(United States) 2013	Group stage	Canada	0–0	Denver
(United States) 2013	Quarter-finals	Cuba	6–1	Atlanta
(United States) 2013	Semi-finals	Mexico	2–1	Arlington
(United States) 2013	Final	United States	0–1	Chicago
(United States) (Canada) 2015	Group stage	Haiti	1–1	Frisco
(United States) (Canada) 2015	Group stage	Honduras	1–1	Foxboro
(United States) (Canada) 2015	Group stage	United States	1–1	Kansas City
(United States) (Canada) 2015	Quarter-finals	Trinidad and Tobago	1–1 (6–5 p)	East Rutherford
(United States) (Canada) 2015	Semi-finals	Mexico	1–2 (a.e.t.)	Atlanta
(United States) (Canada) 2015	Third place match	United States	1–1 (3–2 p)	Chester
(United States) 2017	Group stage	United States	1–1	Nashville
(United States) 2017	Group stage	Nicaragua	2–1	Tampa
(United States) 2017	Group stage	Martinique	3–0	Cleveland
(United States) 2017	Quarter-finals	Costa Rica	0–1	Philadelphia
(Costa Rica) (Jamaica) (United States) 2019	Group stage	Trinidad and Tobago	2–0	Saint Paul
(Costa Rica) (Jamaica) (United States) 2019	Group stage	Guyana	4–2	Cleveland
(Costa Rica) (Jamaica) (United States) 2019	Group stage	United States	0–1	Kansas City
(Costa Rica) (Jamaica) (United States) 2019	Quarter-finals	Jamaica	0–1	Philadelphia
(United States) 2021	Group stage	Qatar	3–3	Houston
(United States) 2021	Group stage	Honduras	2–3	Houston
(United States) 2021	Group stage	Grenada	3–1	Orlando
(United States) (Canada) 2023	Group stage	Costa Rica	2–1	Fort Lauderdale
(United States) (Canada) 2023	Group stage	Martinique	2–1	Harrison
(United States) (Canada) 2023	Group stage	El Salvador	2–2	Houston
(United States) (Canada) 2023	Quarter-finals	Qatar	4–0	Arlington
(United States) (Canada) 2023	Semi-finals	United States	1–1 (5–4 p)	San Diego
(United States) (Canada) 2023	Final	Mexico	0–1	Inglewood
(United States) (Canada) 2025	Group stage	Guadeloupe	5–2	Carson
(United States) (Canada) 2025	Group stage	Guatemala	1–0	Austin
(United States) (Canada) 2025	Group stage	Jamaica	4–1	Austin
(United States) (Canada) 2025	Quarter-finals	Honduras	1–1 (4–5 p)	Glendale

== Record players ==
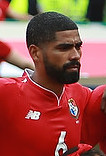
Gabriel Gómez has appeared in 31 CONCACAF Gold Cup matches.

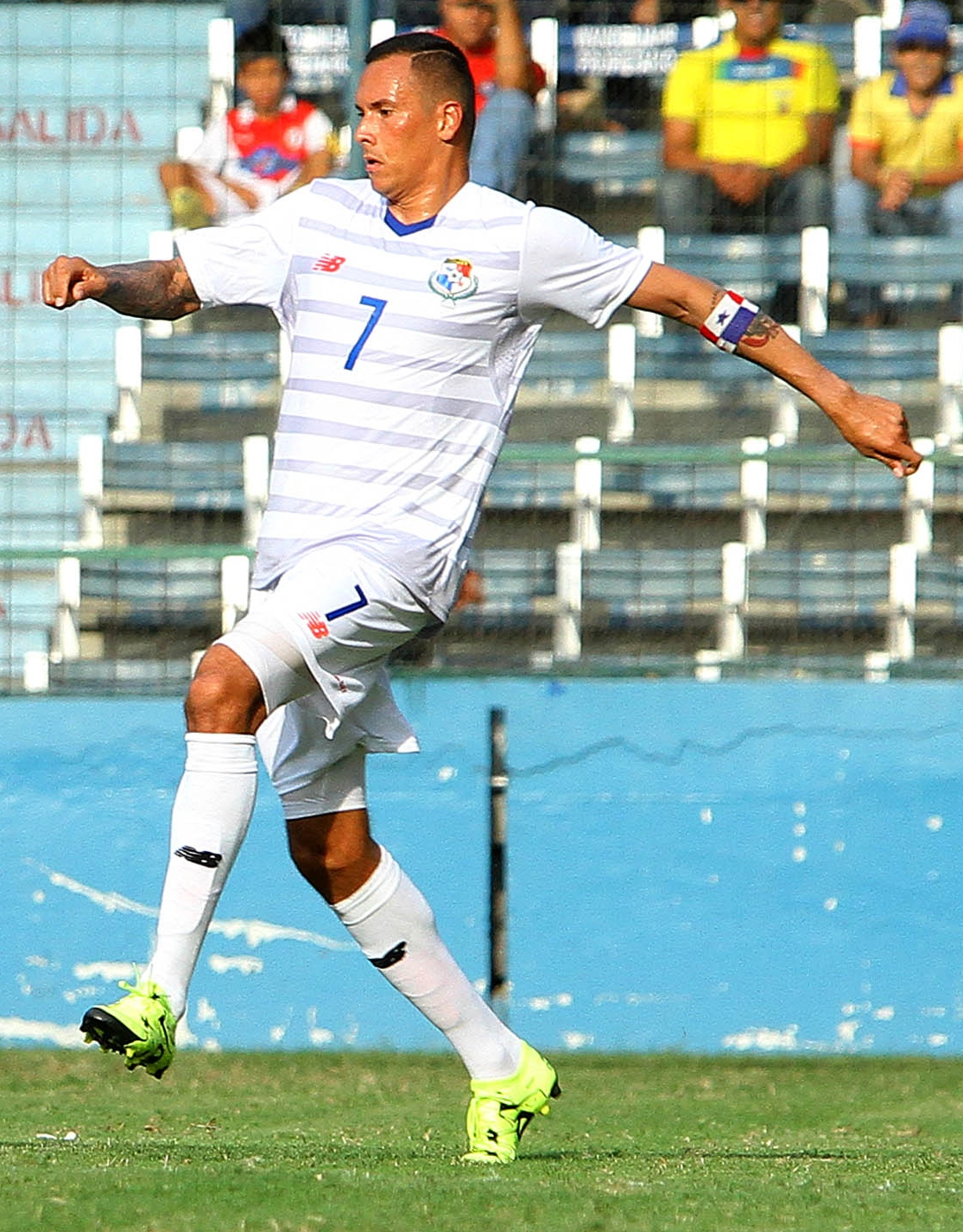
Blas Pérez has scored 11 goals in 21 matches, stretched over five tournaments.

Panama's record cap holder Gabriel Gómez appeared in seven consecutive CONCACAF Gold Cups. After the 2018 FIFA World Cup however, he officially retired from international football.

Rank	Player	Matches	Gold Cups
1	Gabriel Gómez	31	2005, 2007, 2009, 2011, 2013, 2015 and 2017
2	Jaime Penedo	28	2005, 2007, 2009, 2011, 2013 and 2015
3	Alberto Quintero	27	2011, 2013, 2015, 2019, 2021 and 2023
3	Aníbal Godoy	27	2011, 2013, 2015, 2017, 2023 and 2025
5	Román Torres	25	2005, 2007, 2009, 2011, 2013, 2015 and 2019
6	Harold Cummings	22	2011, 2013, 2015, 2019, 2021 and 2023
7	Blas Pérez	21	2007, 2009, 2011, 2013 and 2015
8	Luis Tejada	20	2005, 2007, 2009, 2011 and 2015
9	Armando Cooper	19	2011, 2013, 2015, 2017, 2019 and 2021
10	Gabriel Torres	18	2011, 2013, 2015, 2017, 2019 and 2021
10	Eric Davis	18	2011, 2015, 2017, 2019, 2021, 2023 and 2025

== Top goalscorers ==
Blas Pérez scored at least once at each of his five tournament participations. In 2013, Gabriel Torres became the first Panamanian to win the Golden Boot at a continental championship; Ismael Díaz became the second in 2025.

Rank	Player	Goals	Gold Cups
1	Blas Pérez	11	2007 (3), 2009 (3), 2011 (1), 2013 (3) and 2015 (1)
1	Ismael Díaz	11	2017 (1), 2023 (4) and 2025 (6)
3	Luis Tejada	10	2005 (3), 2009 (2), 2011 (3) and 2015 (2)
4	Gabriel Torres	8	2013 (5), 2017 (2) and 2019 (1)
5	Gabriel Gómez	3	2009 (1) and 2011 (2)
5	Eric Davis	3	2019 (1) and 2021 (2)
5	Yoel Bárcenas	3	2019 (1) and 2023 (2)
5	Tomás Rodríguez	3	2025

== Awards and records ==
Team awards

- Runners-up: 2005, 2013, 2023
- Third place: 2011, 2015
- Fair play award: 2013

Individual awards

- MVP 2005: Luis Tejada
- MVP 2023: Adalberto Carrasquilla
- Golden Boot 2013: Gabriel Torres (5 goals, shared)
- Golden Boot 2025: Ismael Díaz (6 goals)
- Golden Glove 2005: Jaime Penedo
- Golden Glove 2013: Jaime Penedo

== See also ==
- Panama at the Copa América
- Panama at the FIFA World Cup
