= Panama at the Copa América =

The Copa América is South America's major tournament in senior men's football and determines the continental champion. Until 1967, the tournament was known as South American Championship. It is the oldest continental championship in the world.

Panama are not members of the South American football confederation CONMEBOL. But because CONMEBOL only has ten member associations, guest nations have regularly been invited since 1993.

== Record at the Copa América ==
Copa América record
Year	Round	Position	Pld	W	D*	L	GF	GA
(Ecuador) 1993^{1}	Not invited							
(Uruguay) 1995	Not invited							
(Bolivia) 1997	Not invited							
(Paraguay) 1999	Not invited							
(Colombia) 2001	Not invited							
(Peru) 2004	Not invited							
(Venezuela) 2007	Not invited							
(Argentina) 2011	Not invited							
(Chile) 2015	Not invited							
(United States) 2016^{2}	Group stage	12th	3	1	0	2	4	10
(Brazil) 2019	Not invited							
(Brazil) 2021	Not invited							
(United States) 2024	Quarter-finals	7th	4	2	0	2	6	10
Total	Quarter-finals	2/13	7	3	0	4	10	20

^{1} Ecuador 1993 was the first time nations from outside the CONMEBOL were invited.
^{2} United States 2016 was the first time nations from outside the CONMEBOL could qualify and host.

== Copa América Centenario ==
=== Group D ===
Pos	Team	Pld	W	D	L	GF	GA	GD	Pts	Qualification
1	Argentina	3	3	0	0	10	1	+9	9	Advance to knockout stage
2	Chile	3	2	0	1	7	5	+2	6	Advance to knockout stage
3	Panama	3	1	0	2	4	10	−6	3	
4	Bolivia	3	0	0	3	2	7	−5	0	

Source: CONMEBOL & CONCACAF

=== Panama vs Bolivia ===
The two teams had met in four previous encounters, the latest being a friendly held at the Estadio Ramón Tahuichi Aguilera in Santa Cruz, which Panama won 3–1. This match marked Panama's debut in Copa América, making them the third Central American country to appear at the tournament, after Costa Rica and Honduras.

6 June 2016
19:00

Panama	2–1	Bolivia
Pérez 11', 87'	Report (CONMEBOL); Report (CONCACAF)	Arce 54'

Camping World Stadium, Orlando
Attendance: 13,466
Referee: Ricardo Montero (Costa Rica)

Panama	Bolivia

GK	1	Jaime Penedo
RB	13	Adolfo Machado	(yellow card) 79'
CB	23	Felipe Baloy (c)	(yellow card) 77'
CB	3	Harold Cummings	(yellow card) 53'	(substituted off) 63'
LB	5	Roderick Miller
RM	11	Armando Cooper	(yellow card) 68'	(substituted off) 74'
CM	20	Aníbal Godoy
CM	6	Gabriel Gómez
LM	19	Alberto Quintero
CF	7	Blas Pérez	(yellow card) 60'
CF	8	Gabriel Torres		(substituted off) 56'
Substitutions:
FW	10	Luis Tejada		(substituted in) 56'
DF	17	Luis Henríquez		(substituted in) 63'
FW	16	Abdiel Arroyo		(substituted in) 74'
Manager:
(Colombia) Hernán Darío Gómez

GK	1	Carlos Lampe (c)
CB	21	Ronald Eguino		(substituted off) 46'
CB	5	Nelson Cabrera
CB	22	Edward Zenteno
RM	4	Diego Bejarano
CM	20	Fernando Saucedo		(substituted off) 46'
CM	15	Pedro Azogue	(yellow card) 77'
LM	17	Marvin Bejarano
RW	8	Martin Smedberg-Dalence
CF	9	Yasmani Duk		(substituted off) 87'
LW	7	Juan Carlos Arce	(yellow card) 17'
Substitutions:
MF	10	Jhasmani Campos		(substituted in) 46'
MF	13	Alejandro Meleán		(substituted in) 46'
FW	18	Rodrigo Ramallo		(substituted in) 87'
Manager:
Julio César Baldivieso

Man of the Match:
Blas Pérez (Panama)

Assistant referees:
Octavio Jara (Costa Rica)
Juan Carlos Mora (Costa Rica)
Fourth official:
Wilson Lamouroux (Colombia)
Fifth official:
Peter Manikowski (United States)

=== Argentina vs Panama ===
The two teams had met in just one previous occasion, a friendly match held at the Estadio Brigadier General Estanislao López in 2011, won by Argentina 3–1.

10 June 2016
21:30

Argentina	5–0	Panama
Otamendi 7'; Messi 68', 78', 87'; Agüero 90'	Report (CONMEBOL); Report (CONCACAF)

Soldier Field, Chicago
Attendance: 53,885
Referee: Joel Aguilar (El Salvador)

Argentina	Panama

GK	1	Sergio Romero
RB	4	Gabriel Mercado
CB	17	Nicolás Otamendi
CB	13	Ramiro Funes Mori
LB	16	Marcos Rojo
CM	19	Éver Banega
CM	14	Javier Mascherano (c)	(yellow card) 17'
CM	8	Augusto Fernández	(yellow card) 15'	(substituted off) 61'
RF	20	Nicolás Gaitán	(yellow card) 66'
CF	9	Gonzalo Higuaín		(substituted off) 76'
LF	7	Ángel Di María		(substituted off) 43'
Substitutions:
MF	18	Erik Lamela		(substituted in) 43'
FW	10	Lionel Messi		(substituted in) 61'
FW	11	Sergio Agüero		(substituted in) 76'
Manager:
Gerardo Martino

GK	1	Jaime Penedo
RB	13	Adolfo Machado
CB	23	Felipe Baloy (c)	(yellow card) 17'
CB	5	Roderick Miller
LB	17	Luis Henríquez	(yellow card) 78'
DM	6	Gabriel Gómez
RM	20	Aníbal Godoy	(yellow card) 22' (yellow-red card) 31'
CM	14	Valentín Pimentel		(substituted off) 20'
CM	19	Alberto Quintero
LM	11	Armando Cooper	(yellow card) 47'	(substituted off) 76'
CF	7	Blas Pérez	(yellow card) 6'	(substituted off) 75'
Substitutions:
MF	2	Miguel Camargo		(substituted in) 20'
FW	10	Luis Tejada		(substituted in) 75'
FW	16	Abdiel Arroyo		(substituted in) 76'
Manager:
(Colombia) Hernán Darío Gómez

Man of the Match:
Lionel Messi (Argentina)

Assistant referees:
Juan Zumba (El Salvador)
William Torres (El Salvador)
Fourth official:
Víctor Carrillo (Peru)
Fifth official:
Coty Carrera (Peru)

=== Chile vs Panama ===
The two teams had met in three previous occasions, the last being a friendly held at the Estadio Municipal Francisco Sánchez Rumoroso in Coquimbo in 2010, which Chile won 2–1.

14 June 2016
20:00

Chile	4–2	Panama
Vargas 15', 43'; Sánchez 50', 89'	Report (CONMEBOL); Report (CONCACAF)	Camargo 5'; Arroyo 75'

Lincoln Financial Field, Philadelphia
Attendance: 27,260
Referee: Roddy Zambrano (Ecuador)

Chile	Panama

GK	1	Claudio Bravo (c)
RB	4	Mauricio Isla	(yellow card) 90+2'
CB	17	Gary Medel		(substituted off) 90'
CB	18	Gonzalo Jara
LM	15	Jean Beausejour		(substituted off) 60'
CM	8	Arturo Vidal		(substituted off) 90'
CM	21	Marcelo Díaz
CM	20	Charles Aránguiz
RW	6	José Pedro Fuenzalida
CF	11	Eduardo Vargas
LW	7	Alexis Sánchez
Substitutions:
FW	22	Edson Puch		(substituted in) 60'
DF	3	Enzo Roco		(substituted in) 90'
MF	10	Pablo Hernández		(substituted in) 90'
Manager:
(Spain) Juan Antonio Pizzi

GK	1	Jaime Penedo
RB	13	Adolfo Machado (c)
CB	3	Harold Cummings	(yellow card) 72'
CB	5	Roderick Miller
LB	17	Luis Henríquez
RM	2	Miguel Camargo	(yellow card) 52'
CM	6	Gabriel Gómez
CM	21	Amílcar Henríquez	(yellow card) 78'
LM	19	Alberto Quintero		(substituted off) 71'
CF	9	Roberto Nurse		(substituted off) 46'
CF	10	Luis Tejada		(substituted off) 46'
Substitutions:
FW	8	Gabriel Torres		(substituted in) 46'
FW	16	Abdiel Arroyo		(substituted in) 46'
MF	18	Ricardo Buitrago		(substituted in) 71'
Manager:
(Colombia) Hernán Darío Gómez

Man of the Match:
Eduardo Vargas (Chile)

Assistant referees:
Byron Romero (Ecuador)
Luis Vera (Ecuador)
Fourth official:
Wilmar Roldán (Colombia)
Fifth official:
John Alexander León (Colombia)

== 2024 Copa América ==
=== Group stage ===
Pos	Team	Pld	W	D	L	GF	GA	GD	Pts	Qualification
1	Uruguay	3	3	0	0	9	1	+8	9	Advance to knockout stage
2	Panama	3	2	0	1	6	5	+1	6	Advance to knockout stage
3	United States (H)	3	1	0	2	3	3	0	3	
4	Bolivia	3	0	0	3	1	10	−9	0	

Source: CONMEBOL
(H) Hosts
June 23, 2024
9:00 pm EDT (UTC−4)

Uruguay	3–1	Panama
M. Araújo 16'; Núñez 85'; Viña 90+1'	Report (CONMEBOL); Report (CONCACAF)	Murillo 90+5'

Hard Rock Stadium, Miami Gardens, Florida
Attendance: 33,425
Referee: Piero Maza (Chile)

June 27, 2024
6:00 pm EDT (UTC−4)

Panama	2–1	United States
Blackman 26'; Fajardo 83'	Report (CONMEBOL); Report (CONCACAF)	Balogun 22'

Mercedes-Benz Stadium, Atlanta, Georgia
Attendance: 59,145
Referee: Iván Barton (El Salvador)

July 1, 2024
9:00 pm EDT (UTC−4)

Bolivia	1–3	Panama
Miranda 69'	Report (CONMEBOL); Report (CONCACAF)	Fajardo 22'; Guerrero 79'; Yanis 90+1'

Inter&Co Stadium, Orlando, Florida
Attendance: 16,129
Referee: Edina Alves (Brazil)

=== Knockout stage ===
Quarter-finals

July 6, 2024
3:00 pm MST (UTC−7)

Colombia	5–0	Panama
Córdoba 8'; Rodríguez 15' (pen.); Díaz 41'; Ríos 70'; Borja 90+4' (pen.)	Report (CONMEBOL); Report (CONCACAF)

State Farm Stadium, Glendale, Arizona
Attendance: 39,740
Referee: Maurizio Mariani (Italy)

== See also ==
- Panama at the CONCACAF Gold Cup
- Panama at the FIFA World Cup
