= 2018 FIFA World Cup Group G =

Football tournament group stage

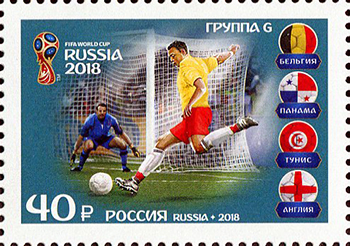
2018 postage stamp from Russia depicting Group G of the 2018 FIFA World Cup group stage.

Group G of the 2018 FIFA World Cup took place from 18 to 28 June 2018. The group consisted of Belgium, Panama, Tunisia, and England. The top two teams, Belgium and England, advanced to the round of 16, and went on to meet each other again in the match for third place, with Belgium winning 2-0.

== Teams ==
Draw position	Team	Pot	Confederation	Method of qualification	Date of qualification	Finals appearance	Last appearance	Previous best performance	FIFA Rankings	
Draw position	Team	Pot	Confederation	Method of qualification	Date of qualification	Finals appearance	Last appearance	Previous best performance	October 2017 (Note: The rankings of October 2017 were used for seeding for the final draw.)	June 2018
G1	Belgium	1	UEFA	UEFA Group H winners	3 September 2017	13th	2014 (quarter-finals)	Fourth place (1986)	5	3
G2	Panama	4	CONCACAF	CONCACAF fifth round third place	10 October 2017	1st	–	–	49	55
G3	Tunisia	3	CAF	CAF third round group A winners	11 November 2017	5th	2006 (group stage)	Group stage (1978, 1998, 2002, 2006)	28	21
G4	England	2	UEFA	UEFA Group F winners	5 October 2017	15th	2014 (group stage)	Winners (1966)	12	12

== Standings ==
Pos	Team	Pld	W	D	L	GF	GA	GD	Pts	Qualification
1	Belgium	3	3	0	0	9	2	+7	9	Advance to knockout stage
2	England	3	2	0	1	8	3	+5	6	Advance to knockout stage
3	Tunisia	3	1	0	2	5	8	−3	3	
4	Panama	3	0	0	3	2	11	−9	0	

Source: FIFA
Rules for classification: Group stage tiebreakers

In the round of 16:

- The winners of Group G, Belgium, advanced to play the runners-up of Group H, Japan.
- The runners-up of Group G, England, advanced to play the winners of Group H, Colombia.

== Matches ==
All times listed are local time.

=== Belgium vs Panama ===
The two teams had never met before this World Cup match.

Yannick Carrasco and Dries Mertens forced early saves from goalkeeper Jaime Penedo. Eden Hazard hit the side-netting after pouncing on a loose backpass from Román Torres. Hazard fired wide in the 26th minute and was left hobbling by heavy challenges from Michael Amir Murillo and Torres. Hazard then shook off the blows and forced Penedo into a save with his legs. After a goalless first half, Mertens steered in a right-foot volley from the right of the penalty area to give Belgium the lead. Kevin De Bruyne almost doubled the lead but narrowly missed the target with a 25-yard free-kick that curled away from Penedo's right-hand post. Belgium doubled their lead in the 69th minute after Romelu Lukaku scored with a diving header after a cross from the left by Kevin De Bruyne. Lukaku then added a third with a chipped finish from the left of the penalty area after a through ball from Hazard.

Belgium's last victory by two goals or more at the FIFA World Cup was a 3–1 defeat of Uruguay in 1990. It also matched their best win in World Cup history, along with a 3–0 victory over El Salvador in 1970.

18 June 2018
18:00 MSK (UTC+3)

Belgium	3–0	Panama
Mertens 47'; Lukaku 69', 75'

Fisht Olympic Stadium, Sochi
Attendance: 43,257
Referee: Janny Sikazwe (Zambia)

Belgium	Panama

GK	1	Thibaut Courtois
CB	2	Toby Alderweireld
CB	20	Dedryck Boyata
CB	5	Jan Vertonghen	(yellow card) 59'
RM	15	Thomas Meunier	(yellow card) 14'
CM	7	Kevin De Bruyne	(yellow card) 88'
CM	6	Axel Witsel		(substituted off) 90'
LM	11	Yannick Carrasco		(substituted off) 74'
RW	14	Dries Mertens		(substituted off) 83'
LW	10	Eden Hazard (c)
CF	9	Romelu Lukaku
Substitutions:
MF	19	Mousa Dembélé		(substituted on) 74'
MF	16	Thorgan Hazard		(substituted on) 83'
MF	22	Nacer Chadli		(substituted on) 90'
Manager:
(Spain) Roberto Martínez

GK	1	Jaime Penedo
RB	2	Michael Amir Murillo	(yellow card) 51'
CB	5	Román Torres (c)
CB	4	Fidel Escobar
LB	15	Erick Davis	(yellow card) 18'
DM	6	Gabriel Gómez
CM	11	Armando Cooper	(yellow card) 49'
CM	20	Aníbal Godoy	(yellow card) 57'
RW	8	Yoel Bárcenas	(yellow card) 45+2'	(substituted off) 63'
LW	21	José Luis Rodríguez		(substituted off) 63'
CF	7	Blas Pérez		(substituted off) 73'
Substitutions:
FW	9	Gabriel Torres		(substituted on) 63'
FW	10	Ismael Díaz		(substituted on) 63'
FW	18	Luis Tejada		(substituted on) 73'
Manager:
(Colombia) Hernán Darío Gómez

Man of the Match:
Romelu Lukaku (Belgium)

Assistant referees:
Jerson Dos Santos (Angola)
Zakhele Siwela (South Africa)
Fourth official:
Ryuji Sato (Japan)
Reserve assistant referee:
Toru Sagara (Japan)
Video assistant referee:
Bastian Dankert (Germany)
Assistant video assistant referees:
Felix Zwayer (Germany)
Sander van Roekel (Netherlands)
Danny Makkelie (Netherlands)

=== Tunisia vs England ===
The two teams had met in two matches, including one game at the 1998 FIFA World Cup group stage, an England 2–0 victory.

England scored in the 11th minute when Mouez Hassen stopped a John Stones' header from a corner from the left, but could not save a Harry Kane follow-up from close range. Hassen was substituted four minutes later for Farouk Ben Mustapha due to an injury earlier in the game, after he had a collision with Jesse Lingard. Lingard then mishit a volley from Ashley Young's cross to the far post. After 10 minutes, Ferjani Sassi equalised from the penalty spot after Kyle Walker was penalised for an elbow on Fakhreddine Ben Youssef. Kane had an appeal for a penalty waved away within five minutes of the restart as he was seemingly impeded by a pair of Tunisia players at a corner. In the additional time, Harry Maguire flicked a Kieran Trippier corner from the right into the path of Kane, who headed it inside the goal after being left free at the back post.

England scored more than once for the first time in 10 World Cup matches, since a 2–2 draw against Sweden in 2006. Kane became the first England player to score a brace in a World Cup match since Gary Lineker against Cameroon in 1990.

18 June 2018
21:00 MSK (UTC+3)

Tunisia	1–2	England
Sassi 35' (pen.)		Kane 11', 90+1'

Volgograd Arena, Volgograd
Attendance: 41,064
Referee: Wilmar Roldán (Colombia)

Tunisia	England

GK	22	Mouez Hassen	(substituted off) 16'
RB	11	Dylan Bronn
CB	2	Syam Ben Youssef
CB	4	Yassine Meriah
LB	12	Ali Maâloul
CM	13	Ferjani Sassi
CM	17	Ellyes Skhiri
CM	9	Anice Badri
RF	8	Fakhreddine Ben Youssef
CF	10	Wahbi Khazri (c)	(substituted off) 85'
LF	23	Naïm Sliti	(substituted off) 74'
Substitutions:
GK	1	Farouk Ben Mustapha	(substituted on) 16'
MF	14	Mohamed Amine Ben Amor	(substituted on) 74'
FW	19	Saber Khalifa	(substituted on) 85'
Manager:
Nabil Maâloul

GK	1	Jordan Pickford
CB	2	Kyle Walker	(yellow card) 33'
CB	5	John Stones
CB	6	Harry Maguire
DM	8	Jordan Henderson
CM	20	Dele Alli		(substituted off) 80'
CM	7	Jesse Lingard		(substituted off) 90+3'
RM	12	Kieran Trippier
LM	18	Ashley Young
CF	10	Raheem Sterling		(substituted off) 68'
CF	9	Harry Kane (c)
Substitutions:
FW	19	Marcus Rashford		(substituted on) 68'
MF	21	Ruben Loftus-Cheek		(substituted on) 80'
MF	4	Eric Dier		(substituted on) 90+3'
Manager:
Gareth Southgate

Man of the Match:
Harry Kane (England)

Assistant referees:
Alexander Guzmán (Colombia)
Cristian de la Cruz (Colombia)
Fourth official:
Ricardo Montero (Costa Rica)
Reserve assistant referee:
Hiroshi Yamauchi (Japan)
Video assistant referee:
Sandro Ricci (Brazil)
Assistant video assistant referees:
Gery Vargas (Bolivia)
Emerson de Carvalho (Brazil)
Tiago Martins (Portugal)

=== Belgium vs Tunisia ===
The two teams had faced each other in three matches, including one game at the 2002 FIFA World Cup group stage, which ended in a 1–1 draw.

Just 6 minutes into the game, Syam Ben Youssef's late challenge on Eden Hazard was deemed, with the use of VAR, to have been just inside the area and he stepped up to score the penalty into the bottom-left corner. Ten minutes later, Dries Mertens won possession just inside the Tunisia half before driving forward and passing the ball to Romelu Lukaku. Lukaku then shot a low strike across Farouk Ben Mustapha into the bottom-right corner. Wahbi Khazri's free-kick from the left was met by Dylan Bronn, who flashed a header past Thibaut Courtois. Thomas Meunier found Lukaku inside the area, which he clipped over the onrushing Mustapha. Toby Alderweireld's long pass from defence was taken on the chest by Hazard, who then rounded Mustapha to stroke into an empty net. Michy Batshuayi met Youri Tielemans' cross at the back post with a controlled half-volley to score Belgium's 5th. Khazri scored deep into stoppage time after a swivel in the box.

Lukaku became the first player since Diego Maradona to score back-to-back braces in consecutive world cup games. Hazard's penalty was Belgium's second quickest goal in a World Cup match (5:59), behind only Léopold Anoul's goal against England in 1954, in the fifth minute. For Tunisia, it has registered as their third worst defeat ever in their World Cup history.

23 June 2018
15:00 MSK (UTC+3)

Belgium	5–2	Tunisia
E. Hazard 6' (pen.), 51'; Lukaku 16', 45+3'; Batshuayi 90'		Bronn 18'; Khazri 90+3'

Otkritie Arena, Moscow
Attendance: 44,190
Referee: Jair Marrufo (United States)

Belgium	Tunisia

GK	1	Thibaut Courtois
CB	2	Toby Alderweireld
CB	20	Dedryck Boyata
CB	5	Jan Vertonghen
RM	15	Thomas Meunier
CM	7	Kevin De Bruyne
CM	6	Axel Witsel
LM	11	Yannick Carrasco
RF	14	Dries Mertens	(substituted off) 86'
CF	9	Romelu Lukaku	(substituted off) 59'
LF	10	Eden Hazard (c)	(substituted off) 68'
Substitutions:
MF	8	Marouane Fellaini	(substituted on) 59'
FW	21	Michy Batshuayi	(substituted on) 68'
MF	17	Youri Tielemans	(substituted on) 86'
Manager:
(Spain) Roberto Martínez

GK	1	Farouk Ben Mustapha
RB	11	Dylan Bronn		(substituted off) 24'
CB	2	Syam Ben Youssef		(substituted off) 41'
CB	4	Yassine Meriah
LB	12	Ali Maâloul
CM	7	Saîf-Eddine Khaoui
CM	17	Ellyes Skhiri
CM	13	Ferjani Sassi	(yellow card) 14'	(substituted off) 59'
RF	8	Fakhreddine Ben Youssef
CF	10	Wahbi Khazri (c)
LF	9	Anice Badri
Substitutions:
DF	21	Hamdi Nagguez		(substituted on) 24'
DF	3	Yohan Benalouane		(substituted on) 41'
FW	23	Naïm Sliti		(substituted on) 59'
Manager:
Nabil Maâloul

Man of the Match:
Eden Hazard (Belgium)

Assistant referees:
Corey Rockwell (United States)
Juan Zumba (El Salvador)
Fourth official:
Andrés Cunha (Uruguay)
Reserve assistant referee:
Nicolás Taran (Uruguay)
Video assistant referee:
Mark Geiger (United States)
Assistant video assistant referees:
Bastian Dankert (Germany)
Joe Fletcher (Canada)
Felix Zwayer (Germany)

=== England vs Panama ===
The two teams had never met before.

John Stones headed in from Kieran Trippier's corner to open the scoring. Harry Kane converted a penalty to make it 2–0 following a foul on Jesse Lingard, who was next to find the net with a curling finish with his right foot from the edge of the area. Stones nodded home the rebound after goalkeeper Jaime Penedo had kept out Raheem Sterling's close-range header. Kane scored his second penalty of the match in the stoppage time of first half, hammering the ball into Penedo's top right corner after referee had spotted a foul on the forward by Fidel Escobar. Kane completed his hat-trick with a deflection near the edge of the box off a shot from Ruben Loftus-Cheek. Felipe Baloy scored Panama's first-ever World Cup goal, with a half-volley from a Ricardo Ávila free-kick. The result ensured that both England and Belgium would advance to the knockout stage, while Tunisia and Panama would be eliminated at the group stage.

Gary Lineker was the last England player before Kane to notch more than one goal in consecutive World Cup matches, 32 years ago. At Mexico 1986, Lineker followed up a hat-trick against Poland with a brace against Paraguay. This was England's biggest win at a major tournament. Stones became the first England defender to score two goals in a World Cup match. Kane is the first player to score at least twice in both of his first two World Cup appearances since Grzegorz Lato of Poland in 1974. Kane is the third England player to score a hat-trick in a World Cup match, after Geoff Hurst against Germany in the 1966 final and Gary Lineker against Poland in 1986.

24 June 2018
15:00 MSK (UTC+3)

England	6–1	Panama
Stones 8', 40'; Kane 22' (pen.), 45+1' (pen.), 62'; Lingard 36'		Baloy 78'

Nizhny Novgorod Stadium, Nizhny Novgorod
Attendance: 43,319
Referee: Gehad Grisha (Egypt)

England	Panama

GK	1	Jordan Pickford
CB	2	Kyle Walker
CB	5	John Stones
CB	6	Harry Maguire
DM	8	Jordan Henderson
CM	21	Ruben Loftus-Cheek	(yellow card) 24'
CM	7	Jesse Lingard		(substituted off) 63'
RM	12	Kieran Trippier		(substituted off) 70'
LM	18	Ashley Young
CF	10	Raheem Sterling
CF	9	Harry Kane (c)		(substituted off) 63'
Substitutions:
FW	11	Jamie Vardy		(substituted on) 63'
DF	17	Fabian Delph		(substituted on) 63'
DF	3	Danny Rose		(substituted on) 70'
Manager:
Gareth Southgate

GK	1	Jaime Penedo
RB	2	Michael Amir Murillo	(yellow card) 72'
CB	5	Román Torres (c)
CB	4	Fidel Escobar	(yellow card) 44'
LB	15	Erick Davis
DM	6	Gabriel Gómez		(substituted off) 69'
CM	11	Armando Cooper	(yellow card) 10'
CM	20	Aníbal Godoy		(substituted off) 62'
RW	8	Yoel Bárcenas		(substituted off) 69'
LW	21	José Luis Rodríguez
CF	7	Blas Pérez
Substitutions:
MF	19	Ricardo Ávila		(substituted on) 62'
FW	16	Abdiel Arroyo		(substituted on) 69'
DF	23	Felipe Baloy		(substituted on) 69'
Manager:
(Colombia) Hernán Darío Gómez

Man of the Match:
Harry Kane (England)

Assistant referees:
Redouane Achik (Morocco)
Waleed Ahmed (Sudan)
Fourth official:
Norbert Hauata (Tahiti)
Reserve assistant referee:
Bertrand Brial (New Caledonia)
Video assistant referee:
Danny Makkelie (Netherlands)
Assistant video assistant referees:
Paweł Gil (Poland)
Sander van Roekel (Netherlands)
Mark Geiger (United States)

=== England vs Belgium ===
The two teams had met in 21 matches, including two matches at the World Cup, one round of 16 game at the 1990 FIFA World Cup which ended in a 1–0 victory for England, and one group stage game at the 1954 FIFA World Cup which ended in a 4–4 draw. Both teams had already guaranteed to advance to the last 16 before kick off, with the winner securing top spot in the group.

Both teams fielded significantly altered line-ups before the game, with media outlets stating that a loss could potentially become beneficial, as the winner would be in the half of the draw with the 4 of the top 7 sides in the world. (Note: Belgium were ranked third, and Germany had already been eliminated. Only Switzerland (6) and Spain (10) would be on the loser's half of the draw from the top 10 of the FIFA World Rankings)

Jordan Pickford kept out a long-range drive from Youri Tielemans before the goalkeeper was rescued by Gary Cahill's goal-line clearance after the ball squirmed out of his grasp. In the 51st minute, Adnan Januzaj cut in from the right and hit a left foot shot into the top left corner of the net. Jamie Vardy sent Marcus Rashford through on goal in the 66th minute, but the striker's effort was turned wide of the post by a touch from Thibaut Courtois.

This 1–0 victory ended Belgium's 82-year winless run against England which dates back to a friendly played in Brussels on 9 May 1936. The scoreline was 3–2 on that occasion. This is the first World Cup match (other than 0–0 draws) in which England failed to score since a 1–0 loss to Portugal in 1986.

28 June 2018
20:00 KALT (UTC+2)

England	0–1	Belgium
		Januzaj 51'

Kaliningrad Stadium, Kaliningrad
Attendance: 33,973
Referee: Damir Skomina (Slovenia)

England	Belgium

GK	1	Jordan Pickford
CB	16	Phil Jones
CB	5	John Stones	(substituted off) 46'
CB	15	Gary Cahill
DM	4	Eric Dier (c)
CM	21	Ruben Loftus-Cheek
CM	17	Fabian Delph
RW	22	Trent Alexander-Arnold	(substituted off) 79'
LW	3	Danny Rose
CF	19	Marcus Rashford
CF	11	Jamie Vardy
Substitutions:
DF	6	Harry Maguire	(substituted on) 46'
FW	14	Danny Welbeck	(substituted on) 79'
Manager:
Gareth Southgate

GK	1	Thibaut Courtois (c)
CB	23	Leander Dendoncker	(yellow card) 33'
CB	20	Dedryck Boyata
CB	3	Thomas Vermaelen		(substituted off) 74'
RM	22	Nacer Chadli
CM	8	Marouane Fellaini
CM	19	Mousa Dembélé
LM	16	Thorgan Hazard
RF	18	Adnan Januzaj		(substituted off) 86'
CF	21	Michy Batshuayi
LF	17	Youri Tielemans	(yellow card) 19'
Substitutions:
DF	4	Vincent Kompany		(substituted on) 74'
FW	14	Dries Mertens		(substituted on) 86'
Manager:
(Spain) Roberto Martínez

Man of the Match:
Adnan Januzaj (Belgium)

Assistant referees:
Jure Praprotnik (Slovenia)
Robert Vukan (Slovenia)
Fourth official:
Mohammed Abdulla Hassan Mohamed (United Arab Emirates)
Reserve assistant referee:
Mohamed Al Hammadi (United Arab Emirates)
Video assistant referee:
Artur Soares Dias (Portugal)
Assistant video assistant referees:
Paweł Gil (Poland)
Roberto Díaz Pérez (Spain)
Mauro Vigliano (Argentina)

=== Panama vs Tunisia ===
The two teams had never met before. Both teams had already been eliminated from the tournament before the match.

Panama took the lead in the 33rd minute, after a José Rodríguez shot from outside the penalty area took a deflection off Yassine Meriah and nestle in the back of the net. In the 51st minute, Naïm Sliti found Wahbi Khazri down the right and the latter's low cross was converted by Fakhreddine Ben Youssef just six yards out. At the 66 minute mark, Khazri finished off a cross from the left by Oussama Haddadi from close range at the back post.

Tunisia won a World Cup match after 40 years, since their 3–1 victory over Mexico in 1978. Panama became the first nation since Serbia & Montenegro and Togo in 2006 to lose each of their first three World Cup games. Panama's goal means this is the first World Cup tournament in which every side has scored at least two goals in the competition. Meriah's own goal was the 50th in World Cup history.

28 June 2018
21:00 MSK (UTC+3)

Panama	1–2	Tunisia
Meriah 33' (o.g.)		F. Ben Youssef 51'; Khazri 66'

Mordovia Arena, Saransk
Attendance: 37,168
Referee: Nawaf Shukralla (Bahrain)

Panama	Tunisia

GK	1	Jaime Penedo
RB	13	Adolfo Machado
CB	5	Román Torres (c)		(substituted off) 56'
CB	4	Fidel Escobar
LB	17	Luis Ovalle
DM	6	Gabriel Gómez	(yellow card) 80'
CM	20	Aníbal Godoy
CM	19	Ricardo Ávila	(yellow card) 78'	(substituted off) 81'
RW	8	Yoel Bárcenas
LW	21	José Luis Rodríguez
CF	9	Gabriel Torres		(substituted off) 46'
Substitutions:
DF	3	Harold Cummings		(substituted on) 46'
FW	18	Luis Tejada	(yellow card) 90+6'	(substituted on) 56'
FW	16	Abdiel Arroyo		(substituted on) 81'
Manager:
(Colombia) Hernán Darío Gómez

GK	16	Aymen Mathlouthi (c)
RB	21	Hamdi Nagguez
CB	6	Rami Bedoui
CB	4	Yassine Meriah
LB	5	Oussama Haddadi
CM	13	Ferjani Sassi	(yellow card) 44'	(substituted off) 46'
CM	17	Ellyes Skhiri
CM	20	Ghailene Chaalali	(yellow card) 90+3'
RF	8	Fakhreddine Ben Youssef
CF	10	Wahbi Khazri		(substituted off) 89'
LF	23	Naïm Sliti		(substituted off) 77'
Substitutions:
FW	9	Anice Badri	(yellow card) 71'	(substituted on) 46'
MF	15	Ahmed Khalil		(substituted on) 77'
MF	18	Bassem Srarfi		(substituted on) 89'
Manager:
Nabil Maâloul

Man of the Match:
Fakhreddine Ben Youssef (Tunisia)

Assistant referees:
Yaser Tulefat (Bahrain)
Taleb Al Maari (Qatar)
Fourth official:
Mehdi Abid Charef (Algeria)
Reserve assistant referee:
Hiroshi Yamauchi (Japan)
Video assistant referee:
Tiago Martins (Portugal)
Assistant video assistant referees:
Abdulrahman Al-Jassim (Qatar)
Marvin Torrentera (Mexico)
Sandro Ricci (Brazil)

== Discipline ==
Fair play points would have been used as tiebreakers if the overall and head-to-head records of teams were tied. These were calculated based on yellow and red cards received in all group matches as follows:

- first yellow card: minus 1 point;
- indirect red card (second yellow card): minus 3 points;
- direct red card: minus 4 points;
- yellow card and direct red card: minus 5 points;

Only one of the above deductions were applied to a player in a single match.

Team	Match 1				Match 2				Match 3				Points
Team	Booked	(yellow card) (yellow-red card)	Sent off (straight red)	(yellow card) (red card)	Booked	(yellow card) (yellow-red card)	Sent off (straight red)	(yellow card) (red card)	Booked	(yellow card) (yellow-red card)	Sent off (straight red)	(yellow card) (red card)	Points
England	1				1								−2
Tunisia					1				3				−4
Belgium	3								2				−5
Panama	5				3				3				−11

== See also ==
- Belgium at the FIFA World Cup
- England at the FIFA World Cup
- Panama at the FIFA World Cup
- Tunisia at the FIFA World Cup
