= Panama at the FIFA World Cup =

International football delegation

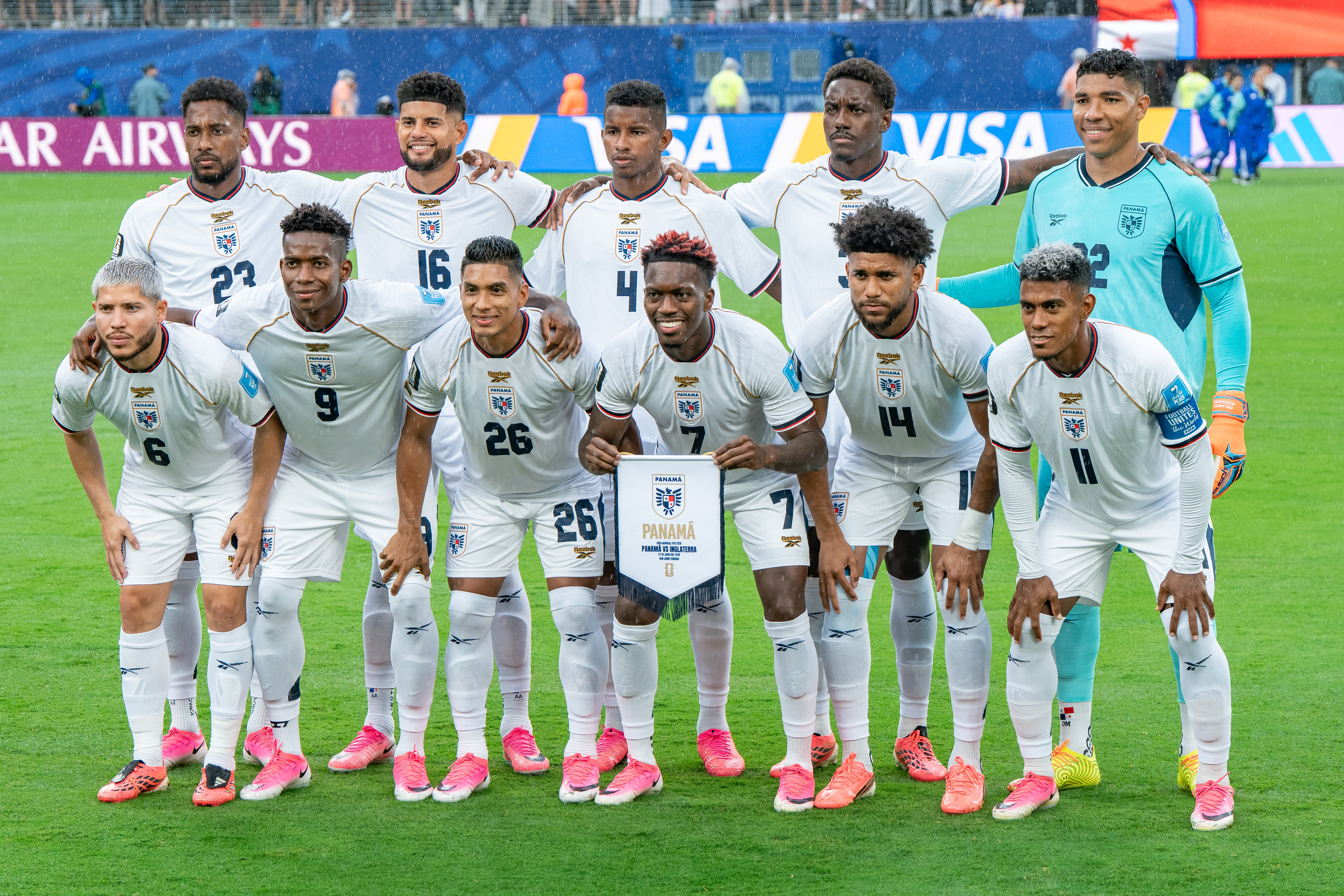
Panama national team at the 2026 FIFA World Cup.

Panama has qualified twice for the FIFA World Cup, in 2018 and 2026. In 2018, they directly qualified after securing the third spot in the hexagonal on the final round. This meant that after 10 failed qualification campaigns, Panama appeared at the World Cup for the first time in their history.

== Overall record ==
FIFA World Cup record										Qualification record					
Year	Round	Position	Pld	W	D	L	GF	GA	Squad	Pld	W	D	L	GF	GA
(Uruguay) 1930	Not a FIFA member									Not a FIFA member					
(Italy) 1934	Not a FIFA member									Not a FIFA member					
(France) 1938	Did not enter									Declined participation					
(Brazil) 1950	Did not enter									Declined participation					
(Switzerland) 1954	Did not enter									Declined participation					
(Sweden) 1958	Did not enter									Declined participation					
(Chile) 1962	Did not enter									Declined participation					
(England) 1966	Did not enter									Declined participation					
(Mexico) 1970	Did not enter									Declined participation					
(West Germany) 1974	Did not enter									Declined participation					
(Argentina) 1978	Did not qualify									6	1	1	4	7	21
(Spain) 1982	Did not qualify									8	0	1	7	3	24
(Mexico) 1986	Did not qualify									2	0	0	2	0	4
(Italy) 1990	Did not qualify									2	0	1	1	1	3
(United States) 1994	Did not qualify									2	1	0	1	2	5
(France) 1998	Did not qualify									8	3	2	3	14	13
(South Korea) (Japan) 2002	Did not qualify									10	3	1	6	9	19
(Germany) 2006	Did not qualify									18	4	4	10	19	32
(South Africa) 2010	Did not qualify									2	1	0	1	2	3
(Brazil) 2014	Did not qualify									20	8	7	5	31	18
(Russia) 2018	Group stage	32nd	3	0	0	3	2	11	Squad	16	6	5	5	16	15
(Qatar) 2022	Did not qualify									20	11	4	5	38	21
(Canada) (Mexico) (United States) 2026	Group stage	43rd	3	0	0	3	0	4	Squad	10	7	3	0	19	5
(Morocco) (Portugal) (Spain) 2030	To be determined									To be determined					
(Saudi Arabia) 2034	To be determined									To be determined					
Total	Group stage	2/21	6	0	0	6	2	15	—	124	45	29	50	161	183

*Draws include knockout matches decided via penalty shoot-out.

== Russia 2018 ==
Following a 2–1 home win over Costa Rica in the final round of the hexagonal, Panama secured their spot in Russia 2018, finishing third in the CONCACAF qualification. Panama finished 32nd (last) in the World Cup.

=== Group stage ===
Pos	Team	Pld	W	D	L	GF	GA	GD	Pts	Qualification
1	Belgium	3	3	0	0	9	2	+7	9	Advance to knockout stage
2	England	3	2	0	1	8	3	+5	6	Advance to knockout stage
3	Tunisia	3	1	0	2	5	8	−3	3	
4	Panama	3	0	0	3	2	11	−9	0	

Source: FIFA
Rules for classification: Group stage tiebreakers
18 June 2018
18:00 MSK (UTC+3)

Belgium	3–0	Panama
Mertens 47'; Lukaku 69', 75'

Fisht Olympic Stadium, Sochi
Attendance: 43,257
Referee: Janny Sikazwe (Zambia)

24 June 2018
15:00 MSK (UTC+3)

England	6–1	Panama
Stones 8', 40'; Kane 22' (pen.), 45+1' (pen.), 62'; Lingard 36'		Baloy 78'

Nizhny Novgorod Stadium, Nizhny Novgorod
Attendance: 43,319
Referee: Gehad Grisha (Egypt)

28 June 2018
21:00 MSK (UTC+3)

Panama	1–2	Tunisia
Meriah 33' (o.g.)		F. Ben Youssef 51'; Khazri 66'

Mordovia Arena, Saransk
Attendance: 37,168
Referee: Nawaf Shukralla (Bahrain)

== United States/Canada/Mexico 2026 ==
Cristian Martínez from Panama was voted Most Valuable Player in the match against Croatia. Panama gave a daring fight against all opponents, which were incumbents in the World Cup. Dalic from the Croatia team recognized Panama as a difficult team. Panama finished 43rd in the World Cup, and was the only team in the World Cup to not score any goals.

=== Group stage ===
Pos	Team	Pld	W	D	L	GF	GA	GD	Pts	Qualification
1	England	3	2	1	0	6	2	+4	7	Advance to knockout stage
2	Croatia	3	2	0	1	5	5	0	6	Advance to knockout stage
3	Ghana	3	1	1	1	2	2	0	4	Advance to knockout stage
4	Panama	3	0	0	3	0	4	−4	0	

Source: FIFA
June 17, 2026
7:00 p.m. UTC−4

Ghana	1–0	Panama
Yirenkyi 90+5'	(Note: "Ghana vs Panama | First Stage | FIFA World Cup 2026". FIFA. Retrieved June 18, 2026.; "Match Report – Group L – Ghana v. Panama". FIFA. June 18, 2026. Retrieved June 18, 2026.; "Post match summary report – Group L – Ghana v. Panama". FIFA. June 18, 2026. Retrieved June 19, 2026.)

BMO Field, Toronto
Attendance: 42,942
Referee: Glenn Nyberg (Sweden)

June 23, 2026
7:00 p.m. UTC−4

Panama	0–1	Croatia
	(Note: "Panama vs Croatia | First Stage | FIFA World Cup 2026". FIFA. Retrieved June 24, 2026.; "Match Report – Group L – Panama v. Croatia". FIFA. June 24, 2026. Retrieved June 24, 2026.; "Post match summary report – Group L – Panama v. Croatia". FIFA. June 24, 2026. Retrieved June 25, 2026.)	Budimir 54'

BMO Field, Toronto
Attendance: 43,036
Referee: Pierre Atcho (Gabon)

June 27, 2026
5:00 p.m. UTC−4

Panama	0–2	England
	(Note: "Panama vs England | First Stage | FIFA World Cup 2026". FIFA. Retrieved June 27, 2026.; "Match Report – Group L – Panama v. England". FIFA. June 27, 2026. Retrieved June 27, 2026.; "Post match summary report – Group L – Panama v. England". FIFA. June 28, 2026. Retrieved June 28, 2026.)	Bellingham 62'; Kane 67'

MetLife Stadium, East Rutherford
Attendance: 80,663
Referee: Abdulrahman Al-Jassim (Qatar)

== Player records ==
=== Most appearances ===
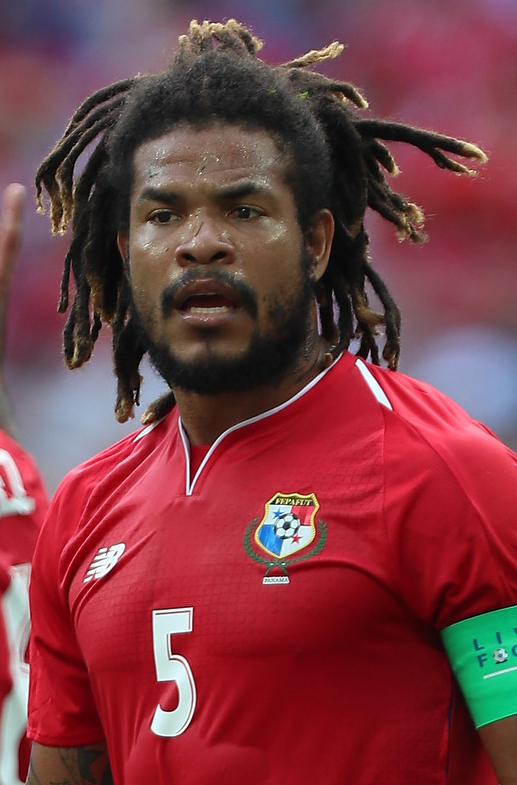
Román Torres captained Panama in all three of their matches at the 2018 World Cup.

Yoel Bárcenas and José Luis Rodríguez were both fielded in all six of Panama's FIFA World Cup matches in 2018 and 2026, making each of them record World Cup players for their country.

Rank	Player	Matches	World Cups
1	Yoel Bárcenas	6	2018 and 2026
1	José Luis Rodríguez	6	2018 and 2026
3	Michael Amir Murillo	5	2018 and 2026
4	Eric Davis	4	2018 and 2026
4	Fidel Escobar	4	2018 and 2026
4	Aníbal Godoy	4	2018 and 2026
7	Gabriel Gómez	3	2018
7	Jaime Penedo	3	2018
7	Román Torres	3	2018
7	Andrés Andrade	3	2026
7	José Córdoba	3	2026
7	Ismael Díaz	3	2026
7	José Fajardo	3	2026
7	Carlos Harvey	3	2026
7	Azarias Londoño	3	2026
7	Cristian Martínez	3	2026
7	Orlando Mosquera	3	2026

=== Goalscorers ===
On 24 June 2018, while trailing 6–0 to England, Felipe Baloy scored off of a long free kick by Ricardo Ávila to record Panama's first ever World Cup goal.

Player	Goals	2018	2026
Felipe Baloy	1	1	
Own goals	1	1	
Total	2	2	0

== See also ==
- North, Central American and Caribbean nations at the FIFA World Cup
- Panama at the CONCACAF Gold Cup
- Panama at the Copa América
