= Felipe Baloy =

Panamanian footballer (born 1981)

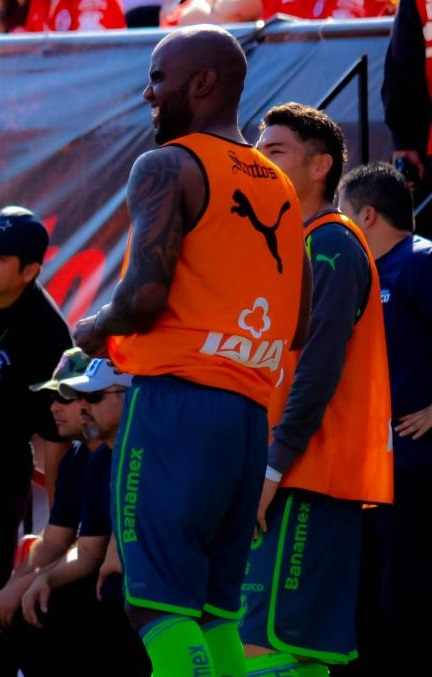
- Baloy with Santos Laguna in 2012

Personal information
- Full name: Felipe Abdiel Baloy Ramírez
- Date of birth: 24 February 1981 (age 45)
- Place of birth: Panama City, Panama
- Height: 1.85 m (6 ft 1 in)
- Position: Defender

Youth career
- Euro Kickers

Senior career*
Years	Team	Apps	(Gls)
1999	Euro Kickers	25	(3)
2000	Sporting '89	30	(4)
2001–2002	Envigado	37	(3)
2003	Independiente Medellín	9	(0)
2003–2004	Grêmio	50	(3)
2005	Atlético Paranaense	5	(0)
2005–2009	Monterrey	145	(10)
2007	→ América (loan)		
2010–2013	Santos Laguna	125	(4)
2014–2016	Morelia	13	(0)
2015–2016	→ Atlas (loan)	19	(2)
2016–2017	Rionegro Águilas	13	(0)
2017	Tauro	5	(2)
2017–2018	Municipal	19	(1)
Total		495	(32)

International career
2001	Panama U20		
2001–2018	Panama	102	(4)

Managerial career
- 2023–2025: Tauro
- 2025–: Panama U17
Medal record
Men's football
Representing Panama
CONCACAF Gold Cup
Runner-up	2005 United States
Third place	2011 United States
Copa Centroamericana
Runner-up	2007 El Salvador
Third place	2011 Panama
- * Club domestic league appearances and goals

Felipe Abdiel Baloy Ramírez (born 24 February 1981) is a Panamanian former professional footballer who played as a defender. He scored Panama’s first ever goal in a FIFA World Cup, against England at the 2018 edition.

== Early life ==
He was the second youngest of his seven brothers and grew in the populous barrio of Cerro Batea in the San Miguelito district after moving from the San Martin barrio. Pipe grew interested in football after playing in the streets with his friends.

== Club career ==
=== Early career ===
At age 18, he started his football career in ANAPROF team Eurokickers, although it lasted only a year as the team was relegated that year. He then moved to Sporting '89 and managed to be part of the Panama U-20 squad where he was spotted by Colombian international representative Luis Felipe Posso, was signed to his agency and the doors opened for Baloy in Colombia.

=== Colombia ===
At age 19, Baloy moved to Colombia to play for Copa Mustang team Envigado in 2001. He played the 2003 and 2002 seasons with them before moving to another Antioquia club, Independiente Medellín. With Medellín he had more success; he played in the Copa Libertadores in 2003 where DIM reached the semi-finals. After only nine league appearances, he joined Brazil's Grêmio.

=== Brazil ===
Baloy started his career in Brazil with Grêmio where he played the 2003 and 2004 seasons in Campeonato Brasileiro Série A. Baloy was made captain of the team, despite being only 23 years old. However, Gremio were displaying poor form, being close to relegation in 2003 and being relegated in 2004. Shortly after Gremio's relegation, Baloy was signed by Athletico Paranaense. Baloy experienced some success after finishing sixth in the 2005 Campeonato Brasileiro Série A, but only played five league games. He also was not part of the side that finished as runner-up after losing to São Paulo in the 2005 Copa Libertadores finals.

=== Mexico ===
Baloy arrived in July 2005 to Mexico to play for Monterrey in the Primera División. He made his debut on 30 July 2005, a match which finished 1–2 in favor of Pachuca. However Baloy had to settle in with the Mexican fans since he was replacing a fan favourite, the Argentine Defender Pablo Rotchen. After a couple of good performances, Baloy gained fan favour.

In 2005, Pipe was part of the Rayados team that finished league runner-up in the 2005 Apertura. After that season, Monterrey were not at the same competitive level as they were before; but Baloy managed to stand out in the team and was called one of the best defenders in Mexico numerous times.

In 2007, Baloy played in the 2007 Copa Libertadores after he was loaned out to Club América for that competition.

In later years, Baloy was linked to several clubs in Europe. In the 2007 winter transfer window he attracted the interest of Premier League side Derby County, however the move never happened. In 2008, he was linked to Premier League side Arsenal.

In the 2009 Apertura, Baloy and Monterrey were crowned champions after defeating Cruz Azul in a 6–4 aggregate score. Baloy became the first Panamanian-born player to ever win the Mexican First Division championship. Pipe was nominated that year for the Mexican Golden Ball as best defender of the year, but came in second behind his teammate Duilio Davino.

Shortly after winning the championship, Baloy made a surprise move to Santos Laguna. That ended a four-year spell in Monterrey where he played 145 times and scored 10 goals.

On 14 December 2013 it was announced Baloy was sold to Monarcas Morelia.

== International career ==
Baloy scored Panama's first and only goal, so far, for the team in the World Cup. He captained the Panama national team for many years including in Russia 2018. He played alongside José Luis Garcés, Luis Tejada, Jaime Penedo among others.

As youngster, Baloy played in the Panama U-20 squad which attempted to qualify to the 2001 FIFA World Youth Championship in Argentina. He made his senior debut for Panama in a May 2001 UNCAF Nations Cup match against Honduras and has, as of 17 November 2017, earned a total of 100 caps, scoring 3 goals. Pipe has represented Panama participating in the 2006 FIFA World Cup qualification. He was also part of the 2005 and 2007 CONCACAF Gold Cup Best XI. He also was part of the side that finished runner-up on both 2005 CONCACAF Gold Cup and UNCAF Nations Cup 2007.

In May 2018 he was named in Panama’s preliminary 35 man squad for the 2018 FIFA World Cup in Russia. He figured in the final squad later on. On 24 June 2018, Baloy scored Panama's first ever goal in a World Cup match in the 1–6 loss against England. He retired from international football after Russia 2018. In Russia he became the oldest debutante to score in a World Cup match.

=== International goals ===
Scores and results list Panama's goal tally first.

#	Date	Venue	Opponent	Score	Result	Competition
1.	17 November 2004	Estadio Rommel Fernández, Panama City, Panama	El Salvador	2–0	3–0	2006 FIFA World Cup qualification
2.	16 February 2007	Estadio Cuscatlán, San Salvador, El Salvador	Guatemala	2–0	2–0	2007 UNCAF Nations Cup
3.	29 March 2016	Estadio Rommel Fernández, Panama City, Panama	Haiti	1–0	1–0	2018 FIFA World Cup qualification
4.	24 June 2018	Nizhny Novgorod Stadium, Nizhny Novgorod, Russia	England	1–6	1–6	2018 FIFA World Cup

== Personal life ==
His father is Chilean and his mother is Panamanian.

Felipe Baloy is married with three children, and lives in Panama with his family. He is a naturalized citizen of Mexico. He has a close friendship with his Panama national team mates Blas Pérez and Gabriel Enrique Gómez.

== Honours ==
=== Player ===
Independiente Medellín

- Copa Libertadores third place: 2003

Atlético Paranaense

- Campeonato Paranaense: 2005
- Copa Libertadores runner-up: 2005

Monterrey

- Primera División: Apertura 2009

Santos Laguna

- Primera División: Clausura 2012
- CONCACAF Champions League runner-up: 2011–12, 2012–13

Morelia

- Supercopa MX: 2014

Tauro

- Liga Panameña: Clausura 2017

Panama

- CONCACAF Gold Cup runner-up: 2005; third place: 2011
- Copa Centroamericana runner-up: 2007; third place: 2011

Individual

- CONCACAF Gold Cup Best XI: 2005, 2007
- Tecate Premios Deportes Best XI: 2008
- FIFA Century Club
- Guinness World Record Award: 2018

Records

- First player to score a goal for Panama in a FIFA World Cup
- Oldest debutante to score in a FIFA World Cup match

=== Manager ===
Tauro

- Liga Panameña: Apertura 2024

Individual

- Liga Panameña Best Manager: Apertura 2024

== See also ==
- List of men's footballers with 100 or more international caps
