= 2023 CONCACAF Gold Cup final =

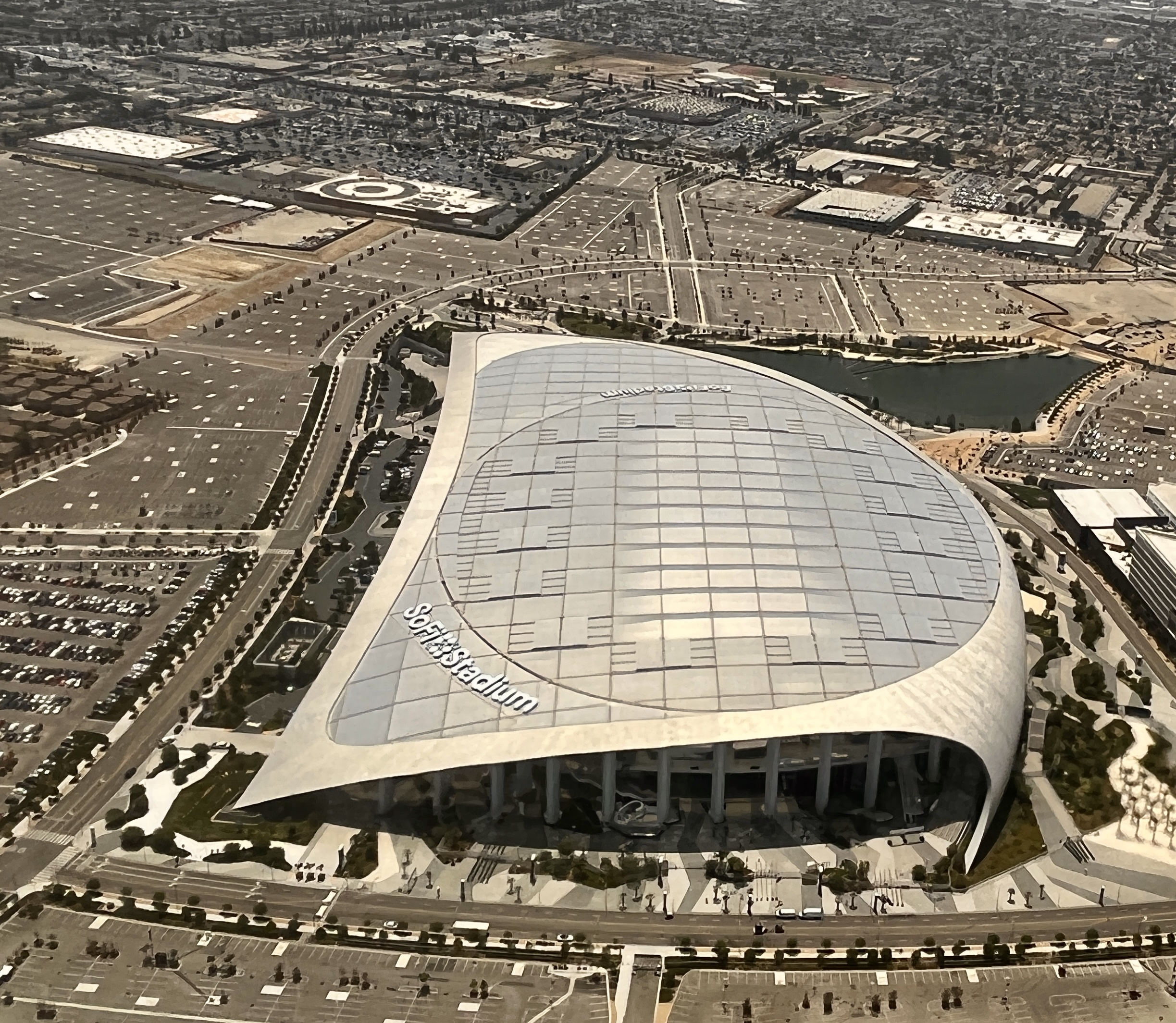
- Aerial view of SoFi Stadium, the host venue for the match
- Event: 2023 CONCACAF Gold Cup
Mexico	Panama
(Mexico)	(Panama)
1	0
- Date: July 16, 2023
- Venue: SoFi Stadium, Inglewood, California
- Man of the Match: Santiago Giménez (Mexico)
- Referee: Saíd Martínez (Honduras)
- Attendance: 72,963

The 2023 CONCACAF Gold Cup final was a soccer match to determine the winner of the 2023 CONCACAF Gold Cup. The match was the 17th final of the Gold Cup, a biennial tournament contested by the men's national teams representing the member associations of CONCACAF and an invited guest to decide the champion of North America, Central America, and the Caribbean. The match was held at SoFi Stadium in Inglewood, California, United States, on July 16, 2023, and was contested by Mexico and Panama.

Mexico won 1–0 thanks to a late goal from substitute Santiago Giménez, securing a record ninth Gold Cup title.

== Background ==
Mexico was the most successful national team at the CONCACAF Gold Cup with eight titles in ten finals played. After being eliminated in the group stage of the 2022 FIFA World Cup, Mexico signed Argentine coach Diego Cocca to replace his fellow countryman Gerardo Martino. Under the management of Cocca, the Mexicans played in the 2023 CONCACAF Nations League Finals, losing 3–0 in the semi-finals to the United States but beating Panama 1–0 in the third place play-off. These results led to Cocca's departure and the arrival of Mexican Jaime Lozano as interim coach a few days before the start of the Gold Cup.

With Danish-born Spaniard coach Thomas Christiansen at the helm, Panama reached their third Gold Cup final to become the team with the most Gold Cup finals, behind only Mexico and the United States. The Panamanians lost the two previous finals to the United States; 3–1 on penalties after a goalless draw in 2005 and 1–0 in 2013.

This unprecedented Gold Cup final was the 29th match between Mexico and Panama. The two sides most recent meeting was in the aforementioned third place play-off of the 2023 CONCACAF Nations League Finals, won by Mexico 1–0.

== Venue ==
The final was held at SoFi Stadium in Inglewood, California, United States, located in the Los Angeles metropolitan area. It was the first major international tournament to be played at the venue, which was built for the Los Angeles Chargers and Los Angeles Rams of the National Football League. The Los Angeles area has previously hosted Gold Cup matches six times, including four finals played at the Los Angeles Memorial Coliseum and two finals at the Rose Bowl. On October 27, 2022, CONCACAF announced that SoFi Stadium would be the host venue for the final. The venue will also host matches during the 2026 FIFA World Cup.

== Route to the final ==
=== Mexico ===
Mexico's route to the final
Round	Opponent	Result
1	Honduras	4–0
2	Haiti	3–1
3	Qatar	0–1
QF	Costa Rica	2–0
SF	Jamaica	3–0

Drawn in Group B, Mexico's first match was against Honduras. Mexico opened the score early, with a first-minute goal from Luis Romo. This was followed by a second goal from Romo and further efforts from Orbelín Pineda and Luis Chávez to secure a 4–0 win. Mexico, then overcame an organized Haiti side with Henry Martín scoring early in the second half, an own goal from Ricardo Adé, and Santiago Giménez complementing to the lead, despite conceding a goal from Danley Jean Jacques. Mexico won 3–1 and became the first team to progress to the knockout stage. With progression assured, Mexico rotated most of their team, resting key players for their final group match against a Qatar side who needed a win to avoid elimination; Mexico would lose the match 1–0, courtesy of a goal from Hazem Shehata. Despite this, Mexico maintained their first spot position as group winners, due to a superior point difference over group runners-up Qatar.

In the quarter-finals, Mexico overcame Group C runners-up Costa Rica 2–0, with second half goals from Pineda and Erick Sánchez. Mexico then faced Jamaica in the semi-finals; El Tri were able to defeat the Caribbean nation with goals from Henry Martín, Luis Chávez and Roberto Alvarado. Mexico thus reached a third consecutive CONCACAF Gold Cup final for the second time in their history.

=== Panama ===
Panama's route to the final
Round	Opponent	Result
1	Costa Rica	2–1
2	Martinique	2–1
3	El Salvador	2–2
QF	Qatar	4–0
SF	United States	1–1 (a.e.t.) (5–4 p)

After winning Group C unbeaten and with seven points, Panama decisively defeated Qatar 4–0 in the quarter-finals; Yoel Bárcenas scored in the first half, followed by a nine-minute Ismael Díaz hat-trick in the second half, making it the fastest hat-trick in Gold Cup history. Panama's semi-final fixture came against reigning champions and hosts United States. Following a 0–0 stalemate after regulation time, Panama took the lead in the first half of extra time through Iván Anderson, but conceded an equalizer from Jesús Ferreira at the end of the first extra time period. With the score remaining at 1–1, both teams headed for a penalty shootout. Panama goalkeeper Orlando Mosquera saved the first United States penalty from Ferreira, while only Cristian Martínez missed for Panama as Adalberto Carrasquilla's successful penalty secured Panama a third final appearance and a first in ten years for Panama.

== Match ==
=== Details ===
July 16, 2023
19:30 (16:30 UTC−7)

Mexico	1–0	Panama
Giménez 88'	Report

SoFi Stadium, Inglewood
Attendance: 72,963
Referee: Saíd Martínez (Honduras)

Mexico	Panama

GK	13	Guillermo Ochoa (c)
RB	19	Jorge Sánchez
CB	3	César Montes	(yellow card) 45+3'
CB	5	Johan Vásquez	(yellow card) 11'
LB	23	Jesús Gallardo	(yellow card) 55'
CM	7	Luis Romo
CM	4	Edson Álvarez	(yellow card) 58'
CM	18	Luis Chávez		(substituted off) 75'
RF	15	Uriel Antuna		(substituted off) 75'
CF	20	Henry Martín		(substituted off) 85'
LF	17	Orbelín Pineda		(substituted off) 90+2'
Substitutions:
FW	10	Roberto Alvarado		(substituted on) 75'
FW	14	Érick Sánchez		(substituted on) 75'
FW	11	Santiago Giménez		(substituted on) 85'
DF	21	Israel Reyes		(substituted on) 90+2'
Interim manager:
Jaime Lozano

GK	22	Orlando Mosquera	(yellow card) 90+6'
CB	4	Fidel Escobar
CB	3	Harold Cummings	(yellow card) 21'	(substituted off) 90+1'
CB	16	Andrés Andrade
RWB	10	Yoel Bárcenas
LWB	15	Eric Davis		(substituted off) 62'
RM	17	José Fajardo
CM	8	Adalberto Carrasquilla	(yellow card) 55'
CM	20	Aníbal Godoy (c)	(yellow card) 62'
LM	11	Ismael Díaz
CF	19	Alberto Quintero		(substituted off) 61'
Substitutions:
FW	18	Cecilio Waterman		(substituted on) 61'
DF	25	Iván Anderson		(substituted on) 62'
FW	9	Azarías Londoño		(substituted on) 90+1'
Manager:
(Spain) Thomas Christiansen			(yellow card) 26'

Man of the Match:
Santiago Giménez (Mexico)

Assistant referees:
Walter López (Honduras)
Christian Ramírez (Honduras)
Reserve assistant referee:
Caleb Wales (Trinidad and Tobago)
Fourth official:
Daneon Parchment (Jamaica)
Video assistant referee:
Ricardo Montero (Costa Rica)
Assistant video assistant referee:
Selvin Brown (Honduras)
