= Copa América Centenario qualifying play-offs =

Tournament details
- Host country: Panama
- Dates: January 8, 2016
- Teams: 4 (from 1 confederation)
- Venue: 1 (in 1 host city)

Tournament statistics
- Matches played: 2
- Goals scored: 5 (2.5 per match)
- Top scorer(s): (Haiti) Kervens Belfort (Panama) Gabriel Gómez (Panama) Luis Tejada (Panama) Armando Cooper (Panama) Blas Pérez (1 goal each)

The Copa América Centenario qualifying play-offs were the international football matches to determine the final two CONCACAF national teams that qualified for the Copa América Centenario to be held in the United States. The two play-off matches (Panama against Cuba, Trinidad and Tobago against Haiti) were held at the Estadio Rommel Fernández in Panama City, Panama on 8 January 2016.

== Background ==
Among the sixteen teams participating in the Copa América Centenario, six of them were from CONCACAF. Four of the six CONCACAF representative teams had already qualified prior to the 2015 CONCACAF Gold Cup:

Team	Zone	Method of qualification
United States	NAFU	Hosts and automatic qualifier
Mexico	NAFU	Automatic qualifier
Costa Rica	UNCAF	2014 Copa Centroamericana winner
Jamaica	CFU	2014 Caribbean Cup winner

The two remaining places were determined by a play-off system which itself was determined by the outcome of the 2015 Gold Cup. The system was as follows:

- If a team other than the four teams already qualified won the 2015 Gold Cup, the Gold Cup winners would qualify for the Copa América Centenario, while the two highest-ranked teams outside of those already qualified for the Copa América Centenario from the 2015 Gold Cup would compete in a play-off.
- If a team that had already qualified won the 2015 Gold Cup, the four highest-ranked teams outside of those already qualified for the Copa América Centenario from the 2015 CONCACAF Gold Cup would compete in two play-offs, with the highest-ranked team facing the fourth highest-ranked team, and the second highest-ranked team facing the third highest-ranked team.

Since the winners of the 2015 CONCACAF Gold Cup (Mexico) had already qualified for the Copa América Centenario, a total of four teams played in the qualifying play-offs.

== 2015 CONCACAF Gold Cup tournament ranking ==
Pos	Team	Pld	W	D	L	GF	GA	GD	Pts	Qualification for Copa América Centenario
1	Mexico	6	4	2	0	16	6	+10	14	Qualified prior to 2015 CONCACAF Gold Cup
2	Jamaica	6	4	1	1	8	6	+2	13	Qualified prior to 2015 CONCACAF Gold Cup
3	Panama	6	0	5	1	6	7	−1	5	Play-offs
4	United States (H)	6	3	2	1	12	5	+7	11	Qualified prior to 2015 CONCACAF Gold Cup
5	Trinidad and Tobago	4	2	2	0	10	6	+4	8	Play-offs
6	Haiti	4	1	1	2	2	3	−1	4	Play-offs
7	Costa Rica	4	0	3	1	3	4	−1	3	Qualified prior to 2015 CONCACAF Gold Cup
8	Cuba	4	1	0	3	1	14	−13	3	Play-offs
9	El Salvador	3	0	2	1	1	2	−1	2	
10	Canada (H)	3	0	2	1	0	1	−1	2	
11	Honduras	3	0	1	2	2	4	−2	1	
12	Guatemala	3	0	1	2	1	4	−3	1	

Source: CONCACAF
(H) Hosts of 2015 CONCACAF Gold Cup

Note: Per statistical convention in football, matches decided in extra time are counted as wins and losses, while matches decided by penalty shoot-out are counted as draws.

== Seeding ==
The four teams were seeded based on the Gold Cup results:

1. Panama
2. Trinidad and Tobago
3. Haiti
4. Cuba

The match-ups in the play-offs were:

- Seed #2 vs Seed #3
- Seed #4 vs Seed #1

It was reported that each tie would be played over two legs in October 2015. However, on 29 October 2015 CONCACAF confirmed that the ties would be played as a single-match doubleheader hosted at the Estadio Rommel Fernández in Panama City, Panama on 8 January 2016, with Panama earning the hosting rights as the highest-seeded team.

== Matches ==
8 January 2016
17:10 UTC−5

Trinidad and Tobago	0–1	Haiti
	Report	Belfort 86' (Note: CONCACAF made a correction and awarded the goal to Kervens Belfort. It had previously been awarded to Pascal Millien.)

Estadio Rommel Fernández, Panama City
Referee: David Gantar (Canada)

Haiti qualified for the Copa América Centenario.

8 January 2016
20:30 UTC−5

Cuba	0–4	Panama
	Report	Gómez 3'; Tejada 17' (pen.); Cooper 52'; Pérez 89'

Estadio Rommel Fernández, Panama City
Referee: Fernando Guerrero (Mexico)

Panama qualified for the Copa América Centenario.
