= 2005 CONCACAF Gold Cup final =

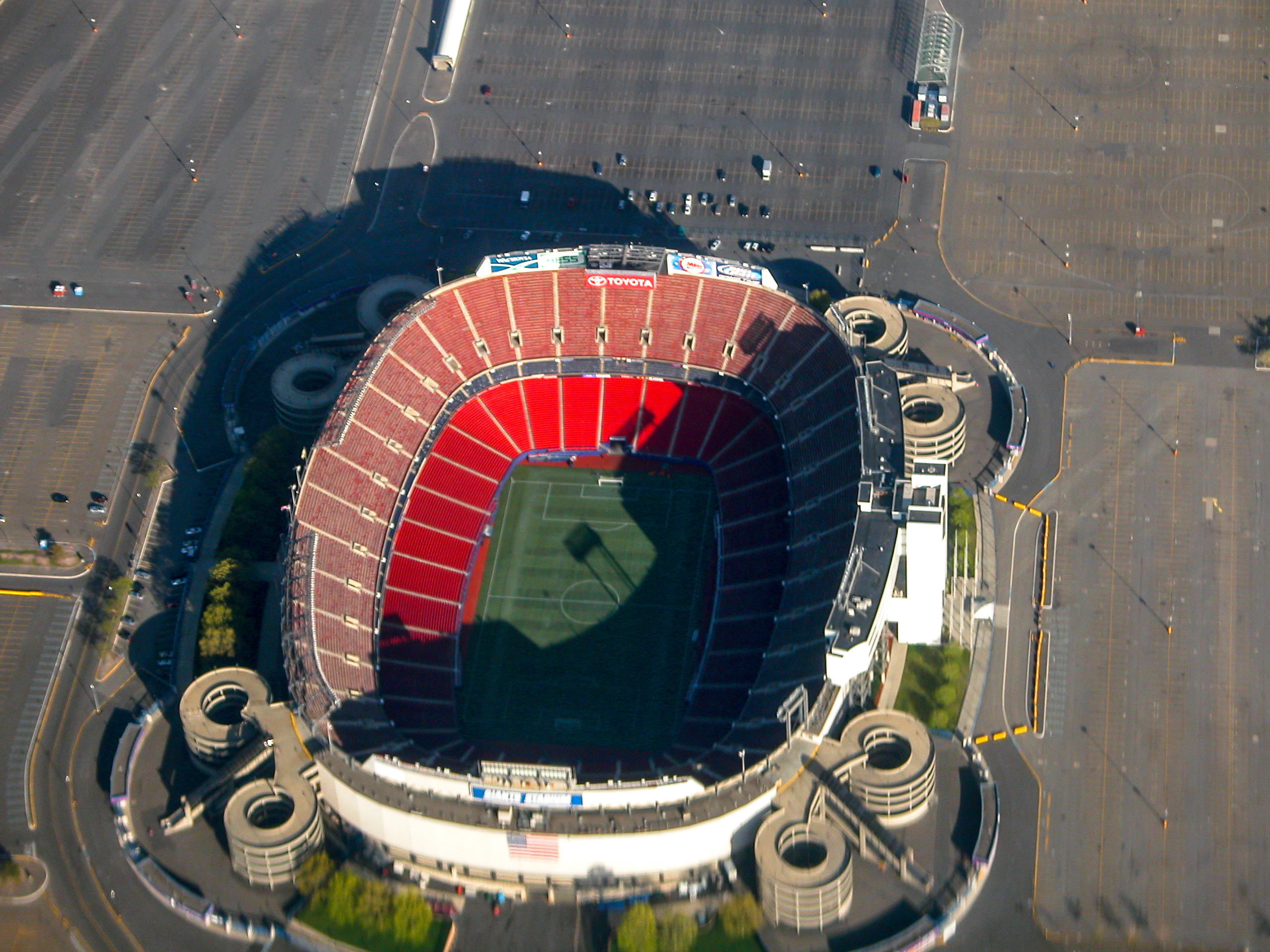
- Giants Stadium hosted the final
- Event: 2005 CONCACAF Gold Cup
United States	Panama
(United States)	(Panama)
0	0
- United States won 3–1 on penalties
- Date: July 24, 2005
- Venue: Giants Stadium, East Rutherford, New Jersey
- Referee: Carlos Batres (Guatemala)
- Attendance: 31,018

The 2005 CONCACAF Gold Cup final was a soccer match to determine the winners of the 2005 CONCACAF Gold Cup. The match was held at Giants Stadium in East Rutherford, New Jersey, on July 24, 2005. It was contested by the winners of the semi-finals, United States and Panama. The game would end in a 0–0 draw after extra time, leading to a penalty shoot-out which the United States would win 3–1 with the decisive kick coming from Brad Davis.

== Route to the final ==
United States
Round
Panama
Opponents
Result
Group stage
Opponents
Result
Cuba
4–1
Match 1
Colombia
1–0
Canada
2–0
Match 2
Trinidad and Tobago
2–2
Costa Rica
0–0
Match 3
Honduras
0–1
Group B winners

Pos	Team	Pld	Pts
1	United States	3	7
2	Costa Rica	3	7
3	Canada	3	3
4	Cuba	3	0

Final standings
Group A runners-up

Pos	Team	Pld	Pts
1	Honduras	3	7
2	Panama	3	4
3	Colombia	3	3
4	Trinidad and Tobago	3	2

Opponents
Result
Knockout stage
Opponents
Result
Jamaica
3–1
Quarter-finals
South Africa
1–1 (5–3 p)
Honduras
2–1
Semi-finals
Colombia
3–2

== Match ==
July 24, 2005
15:00

United States	0–0 (a.e.t.)	Panama
	Report
Penalties
Quaranta (penalty scored); Armas (penalty missed); Donovan (penalty scored); Davis (penalty scored)	3–1	(penalty missed) Tejada; (penalty missed) Jo. Dely Valdés; (penalty scored) Baloy; (penalty missed) Blanco

Giants Stadium, East Rutherford
Attendance: 31,018
Referee: Carlos Batres (Guatemala)
