= Ricardo Ávila =

Panamanian footballer (born 1997)

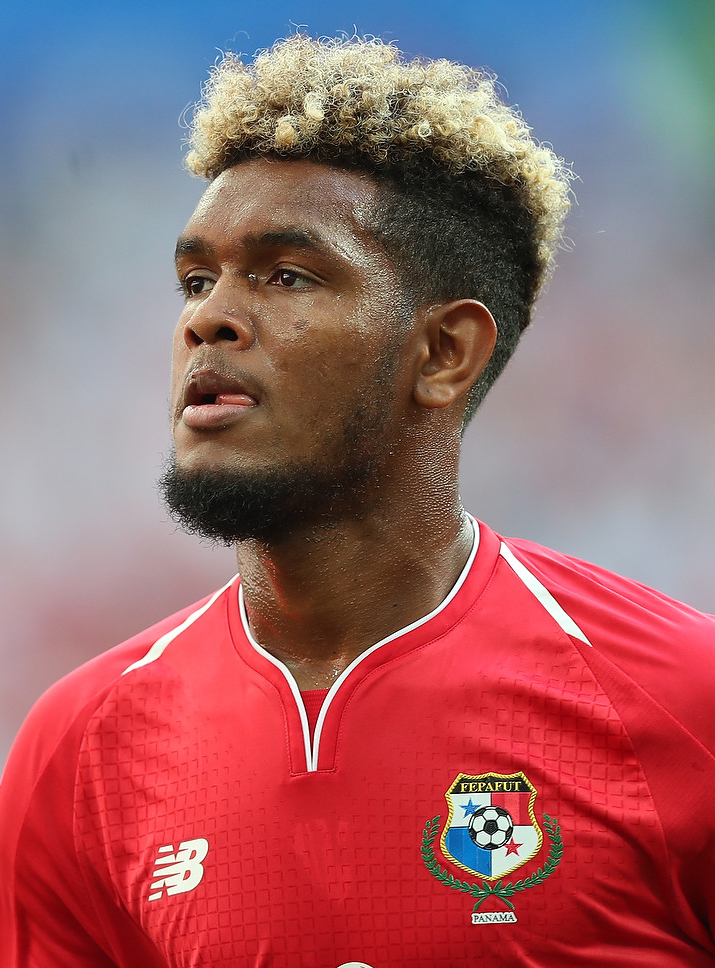
- Ávila playing for Panama at the 2018 FIFA World Cup

Personal information
- Full name: Ricardo Guardia Ávila
- Date of birth: 4 February 1997 (age 29)
- Place of birth: Panama City, Panama
- Height: 1.82 m (6 ft 0 in)
- Position: Defensive midfielder

Senior career*
Years	Team	Apps	(Gls)
2014–2017	Chorrillo	39	(5)
2016–2017	→ Koper (loan)	0	(0)
2017–2018	Gent II	0	(0)
2018–2021	Universitario	6	(0)
2019–2020	→ Real Monarchs (loan)	17	(1)
2021	Veraguas CD	1	(0)
2022-2023	Zulia	21	(4)
2023-2024	Universitario	27	(8)
2024–2025	UMECIT FC	52	(6)

International career^{‡}
2017	Panama U20	5	(4)
2016–2018	Panama	7	(0)
- * Club domestic league appearances and goals as of 22 March 2021 ‡ National team caps and goals as of 28 June 2018

Ricardo Guardia Ávila (born 4 February 1997) is a Panamanian footballer who plays as a midfielder for the Panama national team.

== Club career ==
Born in Panama City, Ávila started his career at Chorrillo in 2014, making 39 appearances and scoring five goals in the Liga Panameña over the course of two-and-a-half seasons. On 29 August 2016, he was sent on loan to Slovenian club Koper, but made no official appearances before returning to Chorrillo in early 2017. On 1 July 2017, he joined Belgian club Gent, being assigned to the reserve squad.

On 24 January 2019, Ávila joined USL Championship side Real Monarchs on loan for their 2019 season.

== International career ==
Ávila represented the Panama under-20 side at the 2017 CONCACAF U-20 Championship.

He made his debut for the senior team in 2016. He was called up for the 2018 World Cup in Russia, replacing the injured Alberto Quintero in the final squad after initially only being named on the standby list.

== Career statistics ==
=== International ===
As of 28 June 2018

Panama
Year	Apps	Goals
2016	1	0
2017	2	0
2018	4	0
Total	7	0
