= Harold Cummings =

Panamanian footballer (born 1992)

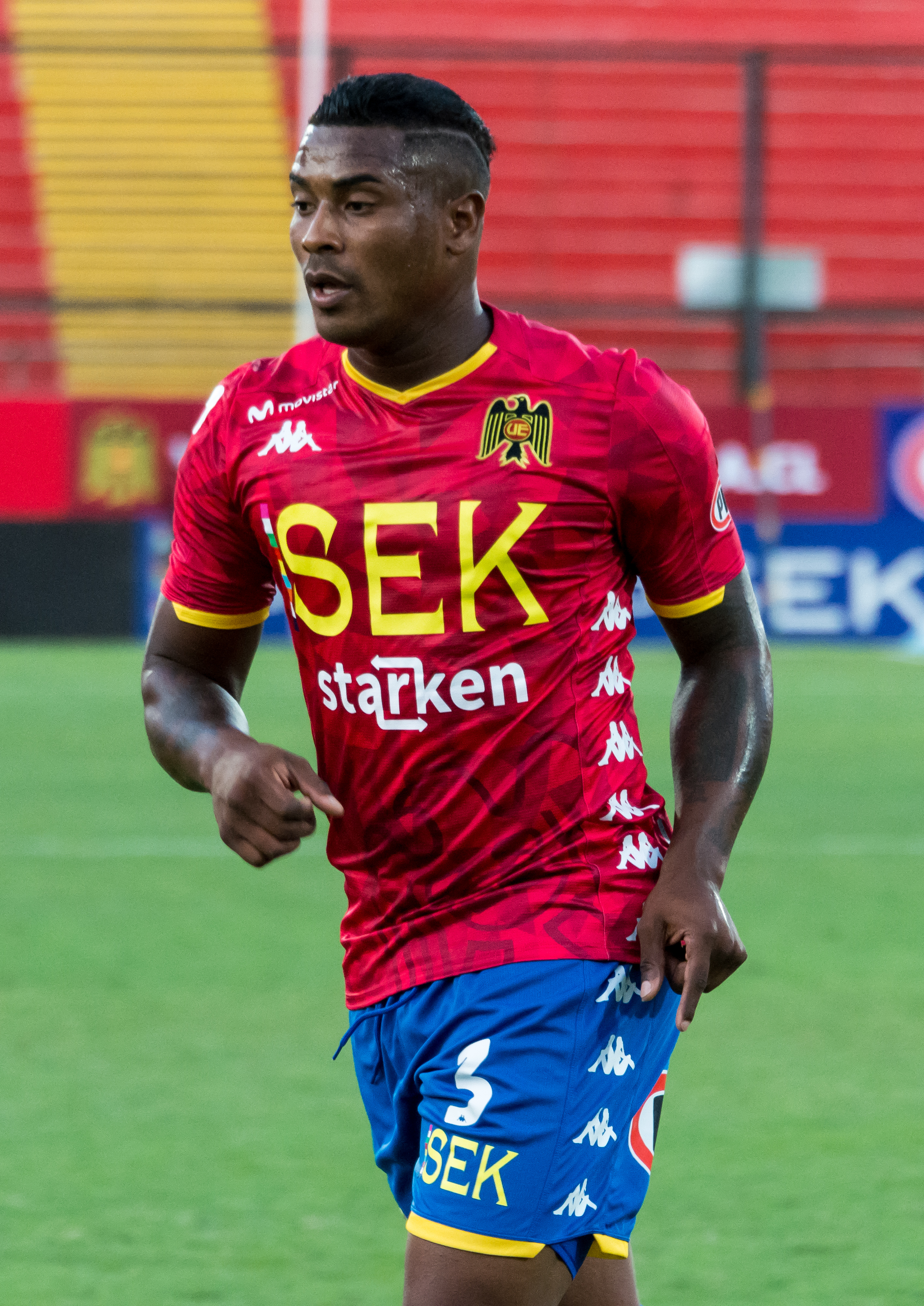
- Cummings playing for Unión Española in 2020

Personal information
- Full name: Harold Oshkaly Cummings Segura
- Date of birth: 1 March 1992 (age 34)
- Place of birth: Panama City, Panama
- Height: 1.83 m (6 ft 0 in)
- Position: Centre-back

Team information
- Current team: Malacateco
- Number: 31

Senior career*
Years	Team	Apps	(Gls)
2009–2014	Árabe Unido	52	(0)
2011–2012	→ River Plate (loan)	0	(0)
2014–2015	Juan Aurich	18	(0)
2015	Santa Fe	12	(0)
2016	LD Alajuelense	24	(1)
2017–2019	San Jose Earthquakes	37	(0)
2020–2021	Unión Española	21	(1)
2021–2022	Always Ready	11	(0)
2022	C.D. Árabe Unido	1	(0)
2022–2023	Cortuluá	12	(0)
2023	Monagas	11	(0)
2023–2024	Árabe Unido	15	(1)
2024–2025	Xelajú	36	(2)
2025	Plaza Amador	8	(1)
2026	Sporting San Miguelito	10	(0)
2026–	Malacateco	0	(0)

International career^{‡}
- Panama U17
2010–2011	Panama U20	9	(0)
2012	Panama U23	6	(0)
2010–	Panama	85	(1)
Medal record
Men's football
Representing Panama
CONCACAF Gold Cup
Runner-up	2023 United States–Canada	Team
- * Club domestic league appearances and goals as of 8 November 2021 ‡ National team caps and goals as of 31 July 2023

Harold Oshkaly Cummings Segura (born 1 March 1992) is a Panamanian professional footballer who plays as a centre-back for Malacateco and captains the Panama national team.

== Club career ==
=== Árabe Unido ===
In 2009, he signed for Liga Panameña de Fútbol club Árabe Unido where he made 22 appearances. In 2011, he signed for Uruguayan Primera División club River Plate on loan.

=== Juan Aurich ===
In January 2014 he joined Peruvian outfit Juan Aurich to play alongside compatriot Luis Tejada

=== Independiente Santa Fe ===
In January 2015 he signed for Categoría Primera A club Independiente Santa Fe.

=== San Jose Earthquakes ===
In January 2017 he signed for Major League Soccer club San Jose Earthquakes joining Panama teammate Aníbal Godoy. Cummings suffered a broken leg at his home in March. Following this injury, he was listed as out for the season in May without having made a single appearance for San Jose. Cummings made his MLS debut on 3 March 2018, in San Jose's season-opening 3–2 victory over Minnesota United.

== International career ==
Cummings was part of the Panama U-20 squad that participated in the 2011 CONCACAF U-20 Championship where he help his nation qualify to the 2011 FIFA U-20 World Cup in Colombia.

His senior international debut for Panama came on 7 September 2010 against Trinidad and Tobago, in a friendly played in Panama City. In 2011, he was called up by Julio Dely Valdés to play the 2011 CONCACAF Gold Cup.

At the start of 2017, Cummings was named to the 2017 Copa Centroamericana Best XI for his performances in the January tournament, which qualified Panama for the 2017 CONCACAF Gold Cup. In February, he received a call-up for Panama's 2018 FIFA World Cup qualification matches against Trinidad and Tobago and the United States on 24 and 28 March, respectively, but was called home from camp by San Jose due to injury issues that the club did not wish to aggravate. These injuries persisted throughout the year and prevented him from taking part in the Gold Cup and in Panama's September World Cup qualifiers as well.

Cummings said in February 2018 that he hoped to make a successful comeback from his injuries and perform well for San Jose, for which he did not appear in 2017, and translate a strong club appearance into call-ups for Panama's March friendlies and eventual 2018 FIFA World Cup appearance, the first in national history. He was called up to the squad for friendlies against Denmark and Switzerland on 22 and 27 March, respectively, alongside San Jose teammate Aníbal Godoy.

In May 2018 he was named in Panama's preliminary 35-man squad for the 2018 World Cup in Russia. He was named in the final 23-man squad, and made a sole appearance in a defeat to Tunisia on June 28, Panama's final match at the tournament.

== Career statistics ==
=== Club ===
As of 7 April 2018

Appearances and goals by club, season and competition
Club	Season	League		National cup (Note: Includes Copa Inca and Superliga Colombiana)		League cup		Other (Note: Includes CONCACAF Champions League, Copa Libertadores, and Copa Sudamericana)		Total	
Club	Season	Apps	Goals	Apps	Goals	Apps	Goals	Apps	Goals	Apps	Goals
Árabe Unido	2009	0	0					5	0	5	0
Árabe Unido	2010–11	22	0					5	0	27	0
Árabe Unido	2012–13	21	0							21	0
Árabe Unido	2013–14	9	0					4	0	13	0
Árabe Unido	Total	52	0					14	0	66	0
Juan Aurich	2014	18	0	9	0					27	0
Santa Fe	2015	11	0	1	0			5	0	17	0
Alajuelense	2015–16	15	1							15	1
Alajuelense	2016–17	9	0							9	0
Alajuelense	Total	24	1							24	1
San Jose Earthquakes	2017	0	0	0	0	0	0			0	0
San Jose Earthquakes	2018	10	0	0	0	0	0			10	0
San Jose Earthquakes	Total	4	0	0	0	0	0			4	0
Career total		110	1	10	0			19	0	139	1

=== International ===
As of matches played 31 July 2023

Appearances and goals by national team and year
National team	Year	Apps	Goals
Panama	2010	3	0
Panama	2011	5	0
Panama	2012	1	0
Panama	2013	11	0
Panama	2014	8	0
Panama	2015	12	0
Panama	2016	6	0
Panama	2017	4	0
Panama	2018	7	1
Panama	2019	8	0
Panama	2020	3	0
Panama	2021	10	0
Panama	2022	3	0
Panama	2023	4	0
Total		85	1

Scores and results list Panama's goal tally first, score column indicates score after each Cummings goal.

List of international goals scored by Harold Cummings
No.	Date	Venue	Opponent	Score	Result	Competition
1	20 November 2018	Estadio Rommel Fernández, Panama City, Panama	Ecuador	1–1	1–2	Friendly

== Honours ==
Santa Fe

- Copa Sudamericana: 2015

Panama

- CONCACAF Gold Cup runner-up: 2013, 2023; third place: 2015
