= Armando Cooper =

Panamanian football player (born 1987)

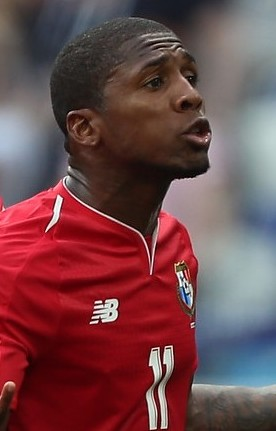
- Cooper with Panama at the 2018 FIFA World Cup

Personal information
- Full name: Armando Enrique Cooper Whitaker
- Date of birth: 26 November 1987 (age 38)
- Place of birth: Colón, Panama
- Height: 1.73 m (5 ft 8 in)
- Position: Midfielder

Team information
- Current team: Árabe Unido
- Number: 13

Youth career
- 2005: Árabe Unido

Senior career*
Years	Team	Apps	(Gls)
2006–2011	Árabe Unido	141	(26)
2011–2015	Godoy Cruz	26	(3)
2013–2014	→ Oțelul Galați (loan)	21	(3)
2015	FC St. Pauli	7	(0)
2015–2016	Árabe Unido	18	(3)
2016	→ Toronto FC (loan)	12	(1)
2017	Toronto FC	23	(0)
2018	Universidad de Chile	3	(0)
2018	Dinamo București	11	(0)
2019	Maccabi Petah Tikva	14	(5)
2019–2020	Árabe Unido	11	(1)
2020	Hapoel Tel Aviv	6	(0)
2020–2021	Maccabi Petah Tikva	17	(3)
2021–2024	Árabe Unido	50	(2)
2025–2026	San Miguelito	13	(0)
2026–	Árabe Unido	1	(0)

International career
2006–2007	Panama U20	14	(3)
2008	Panama U23	5	(1)
2006–2022	Panama	123	(9)
- * Club domestic league appearances and goals as of 14 July 2021

Armando Enrique Cooper Whitaker (born 26 November 1987) is a Panamanian professional footballer who plays as a midfielder for Árabe Unido.

== Club career ==
Cooper began his career in the youth ranks of Panama's Árabe Unido. In 2006, he debuted for the professional side, and went on to help the team to achieve various domestic titles in the Liga Panameña de Fútbol.

In July 2011, he signed with Argentine club Godoy Cruz. For the 2013-14 season, he was loaned out to Romanian club Otelul Galati.

In February 2015, Cooper joined 2. Bundesliga side FC St. Pauli, only to return to Árabe Unido in September 2015 after playing a mere 125 minutes for the German club.

Cooper was loaned to Major League Soccer side Toronto FC on 18 August 2016. He scored his first goal with Toronto FC on 30 November as Toronto FC beat Montreal Impact 7–5 on aggregate to advance to the 2016 MLS Cup Final.

After the 2016 MLS Cup Playoffs, Cooper signed full-time with Toronto FC.

On 14 December 2017, Cooper's contract option was declined by Toronto, and he subsequently left the club.

== International career ==
Cooper was part of the Panama U-20 squad that participated in the 2007 U-20 World Cup held in Canada.

He made his debut with the full national team on 7 October 2006 against the national team of El Salvador. On 16 January 2011, he scored his first goal for Panama in a 2–0 victory over Nicaragua in a 2011 Copa Centroamericana match played at Estadio Rommel Fernández in Panama City.

In May 2018, he was named in Panama's preliminary 35 man squad for the 2018 World Cup in Russia. Cooper played in Panama's first two games against England and Belgium, but after receiving yellow cards in both games he was suspended for the final match against Tunisia.

== Style of play ==
Cooper is known for his energy on the pitch, as well as his creativity and dribbling skills. A versatile midfielder, he is capable of playing in several midfield positions, although he usually favours a more offensive role.

== Career statistics ==
=== International ===
Appearances and goals by national team and year
National team	Year	Apps	Goals
Panama	2006	1	0
Panama	2007	0	0
Panama	2008	0	0
Panama	2009	0	0
Panama	2010	7	0
Panama	2011	20	3
Panama	2012	9	0
Panama	2013	5	0
Panama	2014	8	0
Panama	2015	15	1
Panama	2016	12	1
Panama	2017	19	2
Panama	2018	8	0
Panama	2019	8	1
Panama	2020	2	0
Panama	2021	7	1
Panama	2022	2	0
Total		123	9

Scores and results list Panama's goal tally first, score column indicates score after each Cooper goal.

List of international goals scored by Armando Cooper
No.	Date	Venue	Opponent	Score	Result	Competition
1	16 January 2011	Estadio Rommel Fernández, Panama City, Panama	Nicaragua	1–0	2–0	2011 Copa Centroamericana
2	18 January 2011	Estadio Rommel Fernández, Panama City, Panama	El Salvador	2–0	2–0	2011 Copa Centroamericana
3	10 August 2011	Estadio Ramón Tahuichi Aguilera, Santa Cruz de la Sierra, Bolivia	Bolivia	3–1	3–1	Friendly
4	13 November 2015	Independence Park, Kingston, Jamaica	Jamaica	1–0	2–0	2018 FIFA World Cup qualification
5	8 January 2016	Estadio Rommel Fernández, Panama City, Panama	Cuba	1–0	4–0	Copa América Centenario qualification
6	22 January 2017	Estadio Rommel Fernández, Panama City, Panama	Costa Rica	1–0	1–0	2017 Copa Centroamericana
7	14 November 2017	Cardiff City Stadium, Cardiff, Wales	Wales	1–1	1–1	Friendly
8	18 June 2019	Allianz Field, Saint Paul, United States	Trinidad and Tobago	1–0	2–0	2019 CONCACAF Gold Cup
9	5 June 2021	Estadio Nacional, Panama City, Panama	Anguilla	1–0	13–0	2022 FIFA World Cup qualification

== Honours ==
Toronto FC

- MLS Cup: 2017; runner-up: 2016
- Eastern Conference Championship (playoffs): 2016, 2017
- Supporters' Shield: 2017
- Canadian Championship: 2017
- Trillium Cup: 2017

Panama

- CONCACAF Gold Cup third place: 2015

== See also ==
- List of footballers with 100 or more caps
