= Alberto Quintero (footballer) =

Panamanian footballer (born 1987)

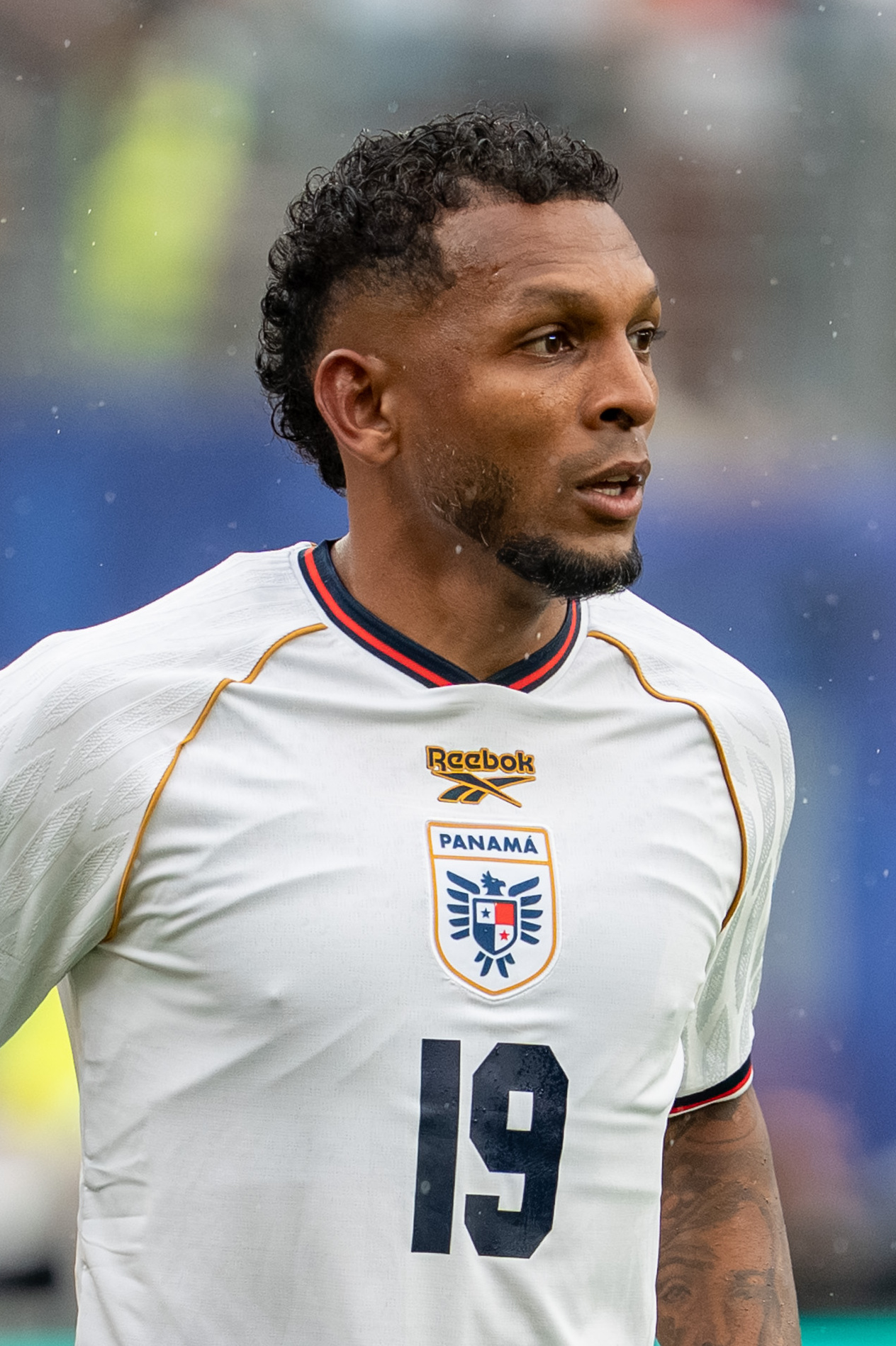
- Quintero with Panama in 2026

Personal information
- Full name: Alberto Abdiel Quintero Medina
- Date of birth: 18 December 1987 (age 38)
- Place of birth: Panama City, Panama
- Height: 1.65 m (5 ft 5 in)
- Position: Winger

Team information
- Current team: Plaza Amador
- Number: 19

Youth career
- 2005–2006: Chorrillo

Senior career*
Years	Team	Apps	(Gls)
2006–2008	Chorrillo	57	(11)
2008–2009	Torrellano	36	(10)
2009–2010	Cartagena	19	(0)
2010–2011	Ontinyent	17	(0)
2011–2013	Chorrillo	19	(3)
2012	→ Independiente Medellín (loan)	15	(0)
2013–2014	Lobos BUAP	9	(0)
2014	Mérida	2	(0)
2014	Mineros	7	(0)
2015–2016	Lobos BUAP	31	(5)
2016	→ San Jose Earthquakes (loan)	30	(3)
2017–2022	Universitario	161	(32)
2023	Cienciano	30	(3)
2024–	Plaza Amador	92	(11)

International career
2006–2007	Panama U20	7	(1)
2008	Panama U23	5	(2)
2007–2026	Panama	142	(7)
Medal record
Men's football
Representing Panama
CONCACAF Gold Cup
Runner-up	2023 United States–Canada	Team
- * Club domestic league appearances and goals as of 16:39, 31 October 2026 (UTC)

Alberto Abdiel Quintero Medina (born 18 December 1987) is a Panamanian professional footballer who plays as a winger for Liga LPF club Plaza Amador.

== Club career ==
=== Early career and Spain ===
Nicknamed Negrito, Quintero was born in Panama City. He started out in his country with Chorrillo FC, then moved to Spanish amateur football with Torrellano CF in Elche. A key player for the side, he achieved promotion to Tercera División.

Subsequently, Quintero joined FC Cartagena, three levels above his previous and just returned to Segunda División; since he had arrived in Spain with a tourist visa, which expired after three months, he stayed illegally in the country for almost a year before regularising his residence status with the help of the club. He struggled tremendously while adjusting to his new team, namely in an incident at Real Betis on 27 September 2009 (0–0 draw) where he was subjected to constant racist abuse by the opposing fans. His debut in the competition took place on 5 September, coming on as a late substitute in a 2–0 home win against Rayo Vallecano.

Quintero returned to Chorrillo in August 2011, after one season in the Segunda División B with Ontinyent CF.

=== Mexico ===
Following a successful campaign for Panama at the 2013 CONCACAF Gold Cup, Quintero caught the attention of C.F. Pachuca, who was due to sign him in August 2013. Nothing came of it, but he moved to another club in Mexico, Ascenso MX's Lobos BUAP.

After spells at C.F. Mérida and Mineros de Zacatecas, Quintero returned to BUAP in January 2015. Eleven months later, he was loaned to San Jose Earthquakes of Major League Soccer, scoring two of his three total goals on 12 May in the 3–1 home victory over Houston Dynamo FC.

=== Peru ===
Quintero joined Peruvian Primera División side Club Universitario de Deportes on 30 January 2017. He scored a career-best 13 goals in his first season.

Quintero won the Apertura 2020. On 16 November 2022, the 35-year-old signed a contract with Cienciano in the same league.

== International career ==
Quintero was part of the Panama squad that participated in the 2007 FIFA U-20 World Cup in Canada. He made his full debut that same year, in a friendly against Guatemala.

Quintero represented his country in 14 FIFA World Cup qualification matches, and was selected for the 2013 CONCACAF Gold Cup, helping the Canaleros to finish second in the United States. He was also picked for the following edition, scoring in the group stage opener against Haiti (1–1).

In May 2018, Quintero was named in Panama's final 23-man squad for the 2018 World Cup in Russia. On 6 June, however, he suffered a fractured foot in a friendly with Norway after a collision with Bjørn Johnsen, thus being ruled out of the tournament and replaced by Ricardo Ávila.

On 5 September 2019, Quintero played his 100th match against Bermuda. The 38-year-old was selected for the 2026 World Cup, making his last appearance in the final group fixture, a 2–0 loss to England in East Rutherford, New Jersey that was also his first ever in the competition.

== Career statistics ==
=== International ===
Appearances and goals by national team and year
National team	Year	Apps	Goals
Panama	2007	1	0
Panama	2010	4	0
Panama	2011	11	2
Panama	2012	9	0
Panama	2013	17	1
Panama	2014	8	0
Panama	2015	16	1
Panama	2016	11	0
Panama	2017	12	0
Panama	2018	5	0
Panama	2019	8	0
Panama	2021	14	3
Panama	2022	13	0
Panama	2023	9	0
Panama	2025	2	0
Panama	2026	2	0
Total		142	7

Scores and results list Panama's goal tally first, score column indicates score after each Quintero goal.

List of international goals scored by Alberto Quintero
No.	Date	Venue	Opponent	Score	Result	Competition
1	29 March 2011	Pedro Marrero, Havana, Cuba	Cuba	2–0	2–0	Friendly
2	29 May 2011	Estadio Rommel Fernández, Panama City, Panama	Grenada	2–0	2–0	Friendly
3	25 January 2013	Estadio Nacional, San José, Costa Rica	Guatemala	3–0	3–0	2013 Copa Centroamericana
4	7 July 2015	Toyota Stadium, Frisco, United States	Haiti	1–0	1–1	2015 CONCACAF Gold Cup
5	5 June 2021	Estadio Nacional, Panama City, Panama	Anguilla	12–0	13–0	2022 FIFA World Cup qualification
6	12 June 2021	Estadio Nacional, Panama City, Panama	Curaçao	1–0	2–1	2022 FIFA World Cup qualification
7	20 July 2021	Exploria Stadium, Orlando, United States	Grenada	1–0	3–1	2021 CONCACAF Gold Cup

== Honours ==
Chorrillo

- Liga LPF: Apertura 2011

Universitario

- Peruvian Primera División: Apertura 2020

Plaza Amador

- Liga LPF: Clausura 2025

Panama

- CONCACAF Gold Cup runner-up: 2013, 2023; third place: 2015

== See also ==
- List of footballers with 100 or more caps
