= Jaime Penedo =

Panamanian footballer (born 1981)

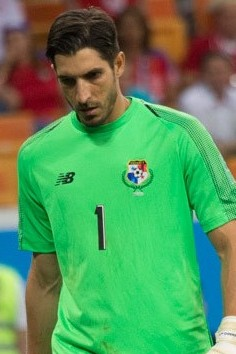
- Penedo with Panama at the 2018 FIFA World Cup

Personal information
- Full name: Jaime Manuel Penedo Cano
- Date of birth: 26 September 1981 (age 45)
- Place of birth: Panama City, Panama
- Height: 1.86 m (6 ft 1 in)
- Position: Goalkeeper

Youth career
- 1991–1999: Estudiantes de Panama

Senior career*
Years	Team	Apps	(Gls)
2000–2001	Estudiantes de Panama	36	(0)
2002–2004	Plaza Amador	51	(0)
2004-2005	Árabe Unido	42	(0)
2005–2006	Osasuna	0	(0)
2006–2007	Osasuna B	12	(0)
2007–2013	Municipal	171	(0)
2013–2015	LA Galaxy	61	(0)
2015–2016	Saprissa	17	(0)
2016–2018	Dinamo București	66	(0)
Total		456	(0)

International career^{‡}
2003–2018	Panama	137	(0)
Medal record
Representing Panama
Men's soccer
CONCACAF Gold Cup
Runner-up	2005 United States
Third place	2011 United States
Runner-up	2013 United States
Third place	2015 United States
- * Club domestic league appearances and goals as of 26 January 2019 ‡ National team caps and goals as of 28 June 2018

Jaime Manuel Penedo Cano (born 26 September 1981) is a Panamanian former professional footballer who played as a goalkeeper for various teams such as: Osasuna B, CSD Municipal, LA Galaxy, Deportivo Saprissa and Dinamo București, among others, but also for the Panama national team, being the goalkeeper of the first squad of Panama that ever played in a World Cup. Penedo announced his retirement on 24 January 2019.

== Club career ==
Penedo began his career with Estudiantes de Panamá F.C. and made his first team debut in 2000. He also played in Panamá for Plaza Amador and Árabe Unido. In his first season with Árabe Unido, Penedo helped the club to the apertura and clausura titles. In summer 2005 he almost joined Italian club Cagliari but he was not approved by the club at the end due some problems with medical exams. The following season, he moved to Spain to play for Osasuna B in Segunda División B. After one season in Spain, Penedo returned to Central America, signing in Guatemala for Municipal. During his time with Municipal Penedo claimed four league titles.

On 5 August 2013, the 2015 CONCACAF Gold Cup Bronze medal-winning goalkeeper signed with the LA Galaxy. He made his Galaxy debut on 7 August 2013 in a mid-season friendly against AC Milan in the inaugural International Champions Cup. Penedo and the LA Galaxy terminated his contract and parted ways on 29 July 2015.

== International career ==
Penedo made his debut for Panama in June 2003 as a substitute for Francisco Portillo in a 1–0 win over Cuba. He has, as of 11 July 2015, earned a total of 122 caps including an unofficial match against Mexico in 2007, scoring no goals. He represented his country in 26 FIFA World Cup qualification matches and was a member of the Panamanian 2005 & 2013 CONCACAF Gold Cup team, who finished second in both tournaments. Penedo won the golden glove at the 2005 CONCACAF Gold Cup and the 2013 CONCACAF Gold Cup, which is given to the best goalkeeper of the tournament.

In 2018 he was named in Panama's 23-man squad for the 2018 FIFA World Cup in Russia. He started in all three of Panama's matches. After the World Cup, he announced his resignation from international duty.

== Honours ==
LA Galaxy

- Major League Soccer: Winner: 2014

Dinamo București

- Cupa Ligii: Winner: 2016–17

C.S.D Municipal

- Liga Nacional de Fútbol de Guatemala: Winner Clausura 2008, Apertura 2009, Clausura 2010, Apertura 2011

Panama

- CONCACAF Gold Cup runner-up: 2005, 2013; third place: 2015

Individual

- CONCACAF Gold Cup Golden Glove Award: 2005, 2013
- CONCACAF Gold Cup Bext XI: 2005
- Liga I Best Goalkeeper: 2017–18 (shared Alberto Cobrea & Giedrius Arlauskis)

== Career statistics ==
=== International ===
As of 28 June 2018

Panama
Year	Apps	Goals
2003	1	0
2004	6	0
2005	15	0
2006	0	0
2007	10	0
2008	5	0
2009	9	0
2010	4	0
2011	15	0
2012	10	0
2013	15	0
2014	3	0
2015	13	0
2016	11	0
2017	7	0
2018	6	0
Total	130	0

== Personal life ==
Penedo officially married Angie Malca in August 2013 and they married in church in January 2015. They have a son, Jaime Matías.

== See also ==
- List of men's footballers with 100 or more international caps
