= Luis Tejada =

Panamanian footballer (1982–2024)

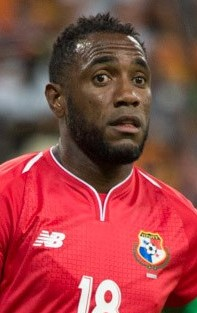
- Tejada with Panama at the 2018 FIFA World Cup

Personal information
- Full name: Luis Carlos Tejada Hansell
- Date of birth: 28 March 1982
- Place of birth: Panama City, Panama
- Date of death: 28 January 2024 (aged 41)
- Place of death: Omar Torrijos, Panama
- Height: 1.83 m (6 ft 0 in)
- Position: Striker

Senior career*
Years	Team	Apps	(Gls)
2001	Tauro	26	(9)
2002	Plaza Amador	27	(14)
2003	Deportes Tolima	2	(0)
2004	Envigado	22	(8)
2005	Al Ain	15	(4)
2005–2006	Plaza Amador	30	(19)
2006	Once Caldas	3	(0)
2007	Real Salt Lake	1	(0)
2007	Tauro	4	(4)
2007–2008	América Cali	30	(16)
2008–2009	Millonarios	25	(1)
2009	Tauro	30	(4)
2010–2012	Juan Aurich	96	(48)
2012–2013	Toluca	30	(7)
2013	→ Veracruz (loan)	12	(2)
2014	Universidad César Vallejo	26	(11)
2015–2016	Juan Aurich	58	(39)
2017	Universitario	37	(18)
2018	Sport Boys	30	(16)
2019	Pirata	25	(6)
2020	CD Universitario	6	(1)
2020	Plaza Amador	8	(2)
2021	Herrera	31	(10)
2022	San Francisco	6	(1)
2022	Deportivo del Este	8	(1)
Total		588	(241)

International career
2001–2018	Panama	108	(43)
- * Club domestic league appearances and goals

Luis Carlos "Matador" Tejada Hansell (28 March 1982 – 28 January 2024) was a Panamanian professional footballer who played as a striker. A journeyman player, Tejada represented over 15 different football clubs in his career. He represented the Panama national team 108 times, appearing at the 2018 FIFA World Cup in Russia.

== Club career ==
=== Early career ===
Tejada's debut in professional soccer was with Tauro in the local league, where he managed to make a good impression and quickly moved to Colombia to play with Colombian side Deportes Tolima. Later on he was transferred to first division team Envigado in 2004, and after a splendid participation in the Gold Cup, he set off to the United Arab Emirates.

In 2005, he signed a three-year contract to send him to Al Ain of the United Arab Emirates. However, he did not yield the same results he obtained in the Gold Cup, reason why shortly after finished the AFC Champions League, and he returned to Panama.

Returning to Panama, he participated in the Clausura Championship with Plaza Amador, one of the best teams in the local league, but he only participated in a few matches. His conditioning was not optimal, and he acquired the nickname of "Gordito (fatty)". Growing into better form, he moved on to Colombia, where he played a short spell with ex Copa Libertadores champions Once Caldas, from which he was fired for disciplinary problems. He then returned to Panama to play for Plaza Amador.

Real Salt Lake of Major League Soccer announced the signing of Tejada on 12 December 2006, for the 2007 season. He played only two minutes in five games, however, before he was released by head coach Jason Kreis in early June. He returned to Panamanian side Tauro for a very brief stint, scoring four goals in four matches.

=== America de Cali ===
In August 2007, Tejada was signed by Colombian club América de Cali. Tejada scored only three goals in the 2007 Torneo Finalizacion; however, he became a key player for América in the next tournament, the 2008 Torneo Apertura, where he scored 12 goals in 19 matches, becoming América de Cali's top-scorer and second overall in the tournament. Tejada's goals helped America reached the finals, with Tejada scoring a goal in the second leg to send the match into penalties, where America lost to Boyacá Chicó on penalties. He was nicknamed by the Colombian press as America's golden tooth (el diente de oro del America) because of his golden tooth. After the tournament, there was much interest for Tejada across big teams from South America and Europe, including Argentine club River Plate; however, nothing was finalized.

=== Millonarios ===
Shortly after the 2008 Apertura concluded, Tejada was sold to another club in Colombia, Millonarios, on a three-year contract. He made his debut on 16 August 2008 in the Embajadores victory over Deportes Quindío. However, Tejada was unable to replicate his form at America with his new club, and he was released shortly after Millonarios failed to quality for the 2009 Apertura playoffs, having scored just once in 25 appearances.

=== Juan Aurich ===
Tejada returned to Tauro in summer 2009, and afterwards moved to Peru to play for champions Juan Aurich in early 2010. In Tejada's first season at the club, the 2010 Torneo Descentralizado, he scored 16 league goals and helped his club secure a Copa Sudamericana spot. In the 2010 Copa Libertadores, Tejada scored six goals, placing fourth in the top scoring chart, including a brace against Tecos on 28 January 2010.

In the following season Tejada finished as topscorer of the league, with 17 goals, as he helped his club win the league title for the first time in history and achieve direct qualification for the 2012 Copa Libertadores. He left Juan Aurich with an impressive 48 goals in 96 games, which attracted interest from teams in stronger leagues such as Mexico and Brazil.

=== Toluca ===
Tejada finally moved to Mexican side Toluca FC in late 2012 as a replacement for the Uruguayan striker Iván Alonso. His spell at Toluca began promising after a late arrival, scoring four goals in five matches; however, his performance and consistency dropped for the liguilla, the Clausura 2013 and in the disappointing performance of Toluca at Copa Libertadores.

=== Later career ===
In summer 2013, Tejada joined Veracruz on loan. For the 2014 season he joined another Peruvian club, Universidad César Vallejo. He scored 11 league goals and participated in the 2014 Copa Sudamericana with the club, but failed to score in any of the Sudamericana games.

In January 2015, Tejada returned to Peru where he played with Juan Aurich for two years and had an excellent spell, scoring 39 goals in 58 appearances. On 1 March 2015, Tejada walked off the pitch during a match against Cienciano after being subjected to racist abuse from fans.

== International career ==
Tejada made his debut for Panama in a June 2001 friendly against Trinidad and Tobago and, until his international retirement in 2018, earned a total of 108 caps, scoring 43 goals. This made him Panama's all-time record goalscorer, just ahead of Blas Pérez. Tejada represented his country in 34 FIFA World Cup qualification matches, and in March 2005, he scored a goal from an overhead kick against Mexico in a 2006 World Cup qualifying match to draw Panama level with the CONCACAF giants. This goal was voted the best goal of the year by Fox Sports.

Tejada led Panama to the 2005 CONCACAF Gold Cup final, where they finished as runners-up to the United States. He scored three goals to end up as joint top scorer, but unfortunately, he missed his penalty kick in the penalty shoot-out against the United States in the final. He was named the Most Valuable Player of the tournament for his efforts. Tejada is currently the all-time leading scorer in Panama history.

Tejada was ejected from the 2015 CONCACAF Gold Cup semi final against Mexico after receiving a red card.

In May 2018, he was named in Panama's 23-man squad for the 2018 FIFA World Cup in Russia.

== Death ==
Tejada died on 28 January 2024 of a suspected heart attack after a pick-up game in his hometown of San Miguelito. He was 41 years old.

== Career statistics ==
=== International ===
Scores and results list Panama's goal tally first, score column indicates score after each Tejada goal.

List of international goals scored by Luis Tejada
No.	Date	Venue	Opponent	Score	Result	Competition
1	27 June 2003	Estadio Rommel Fernández, Panama City, Panama	Cuba	1–0	2–0	Friendly
2	29 June 2003	Estadio Rommel Fernández, Panama City, Panama	Cuba	1–0	1–0	Friendly
3	28 April 2004	Estadio Rommel Fernández, Panama City, Panama	Bermuda	3–0	4–1	Friendly
4	13 June 2004	Estadio Rommel Fernández, Panama City, Panama	Saint Lucia	2–0	4–0	2006 FIFA World Cup qualification
5	20 June 2004	Vieux Fort Stadium, Vieux Fort, Saint Lucia	Saint Lucia	1–0	3–0	2006 FIFA World Cup qualification
6	30 March 2005	Estadio Rommel Fernández, Panama City, Panama	Mexico	1–1	1–1	2006 FIFA World Cup qualification
7	5 July 2005	Orange Bowl, Miami, United States	Colombia	1–0	1–0	2005 CONCACAF Gold Cup
8	9 July 2005	Orange Bowl, Miami, United States	Trinidad and Tobago	1–1	2–2	2005 CONCACAF Gold Cup
9	9 July 2005	Orange Bowl, Miami, United States	Trinidad and Tobago	2–2	2–2	2005 CONCACAF Gold Cup
10	3 September 2005	Estadio Rommel Fernández, Panama City, Panama	Costa Rica	1–3	1–3	2006 FIFA World Cup qualification
11	7 October 2006	Estadio Rommel Fernández, Panama City, Panama	El Salvador	1–0	1–0	Friendly
12	19 November 2006	Estadio Rommel Fernández, Panama City, Panama	Peru	1–0	1–2	Friendly
13	14 January 2007	Weingart Stadium, Monterey Park, United States	Armenia	1–0	1–1	Friendly
14	18 February 2007	Estadio Cuscatlán, San Salvador, El Salvador	Costa Rica	1–0	1–1	2007 UNCAF Nations Cup
15	4 June 2008	Lockhart Stadium, Fort Lauderdale, United States	Canada	1–1	2–2	Friendly
16	15 June 2008	Estadio Rommel Fernández, Panama City, Panama	El Salvador	1–0	1–0	2010 FIFA World Cup qualification
17	31 March 2009	Estadio Agustín Sánchez, La Chorrera, Panama	Haiti	1–0	4–0	Friendly
18	7 June 2009	National Stadium, Kingston, Jamaica	Jamaica	2–2	2–3	Friendly
19	12 July 2009	University of Phoenix Stadium, Glendale, United States	Nicaragua	3–0	4–0	2009 CONCACAF Gold Cup
20	12 July 2009	University of Phoenix Stadium, Glendale, United States	Nicaragua	4–0	4–0	2009 CONCACAF Gold Cup
21	11 August 2010	Estadio Rommel Fernández, Panama City, Panama	Venezuela	2–1	3–1	Friendly
22	3 September 2010	Estadio Rommel Fernández, Panama City, Panama	Costa Rica	1–1	2–2	Friendly
23	3 September 2010	Estadio Rommel Fernández, Panama City, Panama	Costa Rica	2–1	2–2	Friendly
24	7 September 2010	Estadio Rommel Fernández, Panama City, Panama	Trinidad and Tobago	2–0	3–0	Friendly
25	17 November 2010	Estadio Rommel Fernández, Panama City, Panama	Honduras	1–0	2–0	Friendly
26	7 June 2011	Ford Field, Detroit, United States	Guadeloupe	2–0	3–2	2011 CONCACAF Gold Cup
27	14 June 2011	Livestrong Sporting Park, Kansas City, United States	Canada	1–1	1–1	2011 CONCACAF Gold Cup
28	19 June 2011	RFK Stadium, Washington, United States	El Salvador	1–1	1–1	2011 CONCACAF Gold Cup
29	10 August 2011	Estadio Ramón Tahuichi Aguilera, Santa Cruz, Bolivia	Bolivia	1–1	3–1	Friendly
30	10 August 2011	Estadio Ramón Tahuichi Aguilera, Santa Cruz, Bolivia	Bolivia	2–1	3–1	Friendly
31	6 September 2011	Estadio Nacional de Fútbol, Managua, Nicaragua	Nicaragua	1–0	2–1	2014 FIFA World Cup qualification
32	7 October 2011	Windsor Park, Roseau, Dominica	Dominica	2–0	5–0	2014 FIFA World Cup qualification
33	11 October 2011	Estadio Rommel Fernández, Panama City, Panama	Nicaragua	1–0	5–1	2014 FIFA World Cup qualification
34	11 October 2011	Estadio Rommel Fernández, Panama City, Panama	Nicaragua	4–0	5–1	2014 FIFA World Cup qualification
35	26 March 2013	Estadio Rommel Fernández, Panama City, Panama	Honduras	1–0	2–0	2014 FIFA World Cup qualification
36	11 October 2013	Estadio Azteca, Mexico City, Mexico	Mexico	1–1	1–2	2014 FIFA World Cup qualification
37	15 October 2013	Estadio Rommel Fernández, Panama City, Panama	United States	2–1	2–3	2014 FIFA World Cup qualification
38	31 March 2015	Estadio Rommel Fernández, Panama City, Panama	Costa Rica	2–0	2–1	Friendly
39	10 July 2015	Gillette Stadium, Foxborough, United States	Honduras	1–0	1–1	2015 CONCACAF Gold Cup
40	19 July 2015	MetLife Stadium, New York City, United States	Trinidad and Tobago	1–0	1–1	2015 CONCACAF Gold Cup
41	17 November 2015	Estadio Rommel Fernández, Panama City, Panama	Costa Rica	1–2	1–2	2018 FIFA World Cup qualification
42	8 January 2016	Estadio Rommel Fernández, Panama City, Panama	Cuba	2–0	4–0	Copa América Centenario qualification
43	6 September 2016	Estadio Nacional, San José, Costa Rica	Costa Rica	1–3	1–3	2018 FIFA World Cup qualification

== Honours ==
Juan Aurich

- Peruvian First Division: 2011

Panama

- CONCACAF Gold Cup runner-up: 2005; third place: 2015

Individual

- CONCACAF Gold Cup MVP: 2005
- CONCACAF Gold Cup Best XI: 2005
- CONCACAF Gold Cup Top Goalscorer: 2005

== See also ==
- List of top international men's football goalscorers by country
- List of men's footballers with 100 or more international caps
