= Gabriel Gómez (footballer, born 1984) =

Panamanian footballer

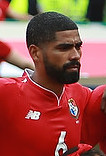
- Gómez with Panama at the 2018 FIFA World Cup

Personal information
- Full name: Gabriel Enrique Gómez Girón
- Date of birth: 29 May 1984 (age 42)
- Place of birth: Panama City, Panama
- Height: 1.83 m (6 ft 0 in)
- Position: Defensive midfielder

Youth career
- Sporting '89
- Envigado

Senior career*
Years	Team	Apps	(Gls)
2002–2003	Envigado	32	(1)
2004	San Francisco	17	(1)
2004	Deportivo Pasto	13	(1)
2005	Tauro	13	(1)
2005	Deportivo Pereira	11	(2)
2006–2008	Santa Fe	40	(1)
2007–2008	→ Belenenses (loan)	25	(1)
2008–2010	Belenenses	46	(2)
2010	Ermis	11	(1)
2011	La Equidad	14	(1)
2011	Indios	8	(3)
2012	Philadelphia Union	24	(6)
2013	Atlético Junior	16	(0)
2013–2014	San Francisco	28	(2)
2014–2016	Herediano	41	(1)
2016	→ Cartaginés (loan)	12	(1)
2016	Deportes Tolima	18	(2)
2017–2019	Atlético Bucaramanga	82	(3)
2020	San Francisco	7	(1)
2020–2021	San Miguelito	32	(1)
Total		490	(32)

International career
2003–2018	Panama	148	(12)
- * Club domestic league appearances and goals

Gabriel Enrique Gómez Girón (born 29 May 1984) is a Panamanian former professional footballer who played as a defensive midfielder.

His own notwithstanding, he played professionally in six countries in a 19-year career, mainly Colombia and Portugal.

Gómez was Panama's all-time record cap holder, appearing in 148 internationals and representing the nation in seven Gold Cup tournaments and the 2018 World Cup.

== Club career ==
In his early career, Panama City-born Gómez – nicknamed Gavilán (Hawk)– rarely settled with a club, playing in both his country and Colombia. In 2007, he moved to Portugal and signed for C.F. Os Belenenses initially on a one-year loan, from Independiente Santa Fe whom he had joined in December 2005.

Gómez made his Primeira Liga debut on 20 August 2007 in a 1–1 draw at Associação Naval 1º de Maio, being relatively used during his three-year stint as the Lisbon side were eventually relegated at the end of the 2009–10 season. In the last minutes of the following summer transfer window, he moved to Cyprus and signed with Ermis Aradippou FC, reuniting with former Belenenses teammate Wender.

In August 2011, after a spell back in Colombia with La Equidad alongside countrymen Gabriel Torres and Román Torres, Gómez teamed up with compatriot Blas Pérez at Mexican Ascenso MX side Indios de Ciudad Juárez. He signed for the Philadelphia Union of Major League Soccer on 21 December 2011, scoring his first league goal in the season opener against the Portland Timbers (3–1 away loss).

Gómez returned to Colombia in December 2012, to play for Atlético Junior. He continued changing clubs and countries in quick succession in the following years, representing San Francisco F.C. and C.S. Herediano.

== International career ==
Gómez represented the Panamanian under-20 team at the 2003 FIFA World Youth Championship in the United Arab Emirates. He made his debut for the full side in a game against El Salvador in the 2003 UNCAF Nations Cup, and went on to play for his country on more than 140 occasions, including in 27 FIFA World Cup qualification matches.

Gómez was named in the 23-man squad for the 2018 World Cup in Russia. He made his debut in the competition on 18 June at the age of 34 years and 20 days, playing the entire 3–0 defeat to Belgium in the group stage; later that month, he announced his retirement from international play.

== Personal life ==
Gómez married former model Ingrid González, sister of former international goalkeeper Donaldo González, fathering two children.

== Career statistics ==
=== Club ===
As of 10 May 2018

Appearances and goals by club, season and competition
Club	Season	League		National cup		League cup		Continental		Total	
Club	Season	Apps	Goals	Apps	Goals	Apps	Goals	Apps	Goals	Apps	Goals
Envigado	2001	15	1	—		—		—		15	1
Envigado	2002	14	0	—		—		—		14	0
Envigado	2003	3	0	—		—		—		3	0
Envigado	Total	32	1	—		—		—		32	1
San Francisco	2004	17	1	—		—		—		17	1
Pasto	2004	13	1	—		—		—		13	1
Tauro	2005	13	1	—		—		—		13	1
Deportivo Pereira	2005	11	2	—		—		—		11	2
Santa Fe	2006	26	1	—		—		9	1	35	2
Santa Fe	2007	14	0	—		—		—		14	0
Santa Fe	Total	40	1	—		—		9	1	49	2
Belenenses (loan)	2007–08	25	1	1	0	1	0	0	0	27	1
Belenenses	2008–09	20	2	2	0	3	0	—		25	2
Belenenses	2009–10	26	0	3	0	1	0	—		30	0
Belenenses	2010–11	0	0	0	0	1	0	—		1	0
Belenenses	Total	46	2	5	0	5	0	—		56	2
Ermis Aradippou	2010–11	11	1	2	1	—		—		11	1
La Equidad	2011	14	1	—		—		—		14	1
Indios	2011–12	8	3	—		—		—		8	3
Philadelphia Union	2012	24	6	2	1	—		—		26	7
Atlético Junior	2013	16	0	3	0	—		—		19	0
San Francisco	2013–14	28	2	—		—		—		28	2
Herediano	2014–15	32	1	—		—		6	1	38	2
Herediano	2015–16	9	0	—		—		2	0	11	0
Herediano	Total	41	1	—		—		8	1	49	2
Cartaginés (loan)	2015–16	12	1	—		—		—		12	1
Deportes Tolima	2016	18	2	3	0	—		0	0	21	2
Atlético Bucaramanga	2017	26	1	1	0	—		—		27	1
Atlético Bucaramanga	2018	10	0	1	0	—		—		11	0
Atlético Bucaramanga	Total	36	1	2	0	—		—		38	1
Career total		405	28	18	2	6	0	17	2	446	32

=== International ===
Appearances and goals by national team and year
National team	Year	Apps	Goals
Panama	2003	4	0
Panama	2004	5	0
Panama	2005	20	0
Panama	2006	6	1
Panama	2007	8	0
Panama	2008	5	0
Panama	2009	7	1
Panama	2010	4	1
Panama	2011	18	5
Panama	2012	6	1
Panama	2013	14	0
Panama	2014	8	1
Panama	2015	14	0
Panama	2016	11	1
Panama	2017	11	1
Panama	2018	7	0
Total		148	12

Scores and results list Panama's goal tally first, score column indicates score after each Gómez goal.

List of international goals scored by Gabriel Gómez
No.	Date	Venue	Opponent	Score	Result	Competition
1	15 August 2006	Estadio Nacional, Lima, Peru	Peru	2–0	2–0	Friendly
2	12 July 2009	University of Phoenix Stadium, Glendale, United States	Nicaragua	2–0	4–0	2009 CONCACAF Gold Cup
3	7 September 2010	Rommel Fernández, Panama City, Panama	Trinidad and Tobago	3–0	3–0	Friendly
4	25 March 2011	Rommel Fernández, Panama City, Panama	Bolivia	1–0	2–0	Friendly
5	29 May 2011	Rommel Fernández, Panama City, Panama	Grenada	1–0	2–0	Friendly
6	7 June 2011	Ford Field, Detroit, United States	Guadeloupe	3–0	3–2	2011 CONCACAF Gold Cup
7	11 June 2011	Raymond James, Tampa, United States	United States	2–0	2–1	2011 CONCACAF Gold Cup
8	12 November 2011	Rommel Fernández, Panama City, Panama	Costa Rica	1–0	2–0	Friendly
9	14 November 2012	Rommel Fernández, Panama City, Panama	Spain	1–5	1–5	Friendly
10	31 May 2014	Toyota Park, Bridgeview, United States	Serbia	1–1	1–1	Friendly
11	8 January 2016	Rommel Fernández, Panama City, Panama	Cuba	1–0	4–0	Copa América Centenario qualifying play-offs
12	28 March 2017	Rommel Fernández, Panama City, Panama	United States	1–1	1–1	2018 World Cup qualification

== Honours ==
Panama

- CONCACAF Gold Cup runner-up: 2005, 2013; third place: 2015

== See also ==
- List of men's footballers with 100 or more international caps
