= Copa América Centenario =

2016 edition of the Copa América, 45th edition of the Copa América

Centennial Cup America (English) Copa América Centenário (Portuguese) Coupe Amérique Centennaire (French)

Tournament details
- Host country: United States
- Dates: June 3 – 26
- Teams: 16 (from 2 confederations)
- Venues: 10 (in 10 host cities)

Final positions
- Champions: Chile (2nd title)
- Runners-up: Argentina
- Third place: Colombia
- Fourth place: United States

Tournament statistics
- Matches played: 32
- Goals scored: 91 (2.84 per match)
- Attendance: 1,483,855 (46,370 per match)
- Top scorer: (Chile) Eduardo Vargas (6 goals)
- Best player: (Chile) Alexis Sánchez
- Best goalkeeper: (Chile) Claudio Bravo
- Fair play award: Argentina

The Copa América Centenario (Portuguese: Copa América Centenário, French: Coupe Amérique Centennaire, English: Centennial Cup America; literally Centennial America Cup), also known as Copa América 2016, was the commemorative 45th edition of the Copa América, the international men's association football championship organized by South America's football ruling body CONMEBOL. The competition was a celebration of the centennial of CONMEBOL and the Copa América, and was the first Copa América hosted outside South America.

It was held as part of an agreement between CONMEBOL and CONCACAF as a special edition between the usual four-year cycle, and featured an expanded field of sixteen teams (an increase from the usual twelve), with all ten teams from CONMEBOL and six teams from CONCACAF. Despite the tournament being an official iteration of the Copa América, the winner did not receive an invitation to the 2017 FIFA Confederations Cup due to the commemorative nature of the tournament, although eventual winner Chile had already qualified through its 2015 victory.

Chile became the fourth nation to win at least two consecutive titles in CONMEBOL tournaments, after Uruguay, Argentina, and Brazil. Argentina, meanwhile, lost its third consecutive final in a major tournament, following losses to Germany at the 2014 World Cup and Chile at the 2015 Copa América.

== Planning ==
In February 2012, Alfredo Hawit, then Acting President of CONCACAF, announced that the competition was expected to take place in 2016, as a celebration of CONMEBOL's centennial. CONMEBOL President Nicolás Leoz said, "Hopefully we can organize a big event, because we're 100 years old and we want to celebrate big."

The tournament was announced by CONMEBOL on October 24, 2012 and confirmed by CONCACAF on May 1, 2014.

On September 26, 2014, FIFA announced that the tournament had been added to the FIFA International Match Calendar, meaning that clubs had to release players called up to the competition.

The tournament occurred in June 2016, along with UEFA Euro 2016.

=== Sports executive corruption ===
The tournament was placed in doubt after several high-profile sports executive arrests were made, including people involved with media rights holder Datisa (using the trading name of "Wematch"), a partnership between three media rights companies—Full Play, Torneos, and Traffic Sports Marketing. In December 2014, Brazilian José Hawilla, the owner and founder of Traffic Sports, pleaded guilty to "corruption charges including racketeering, wire fraud and money laundering". In an indictment, the FBI stated that officials were to receive bribes totaling US$20million for the 2016 event. Datisa held agreements for the commercial rights with CONMEBOL and CONCACAF and had its bank account frozen, placing the tournament in jeopardy. On October 21, 2015, CONCACAF announced it had terminated its agreement with Datisa.

On October 23, 2015, CONCACAF, CONMEBOL, and the hosting association U.S. Soccer Federation all confirmed that the tournament was going ahead as originally intended.

== Trophy ==
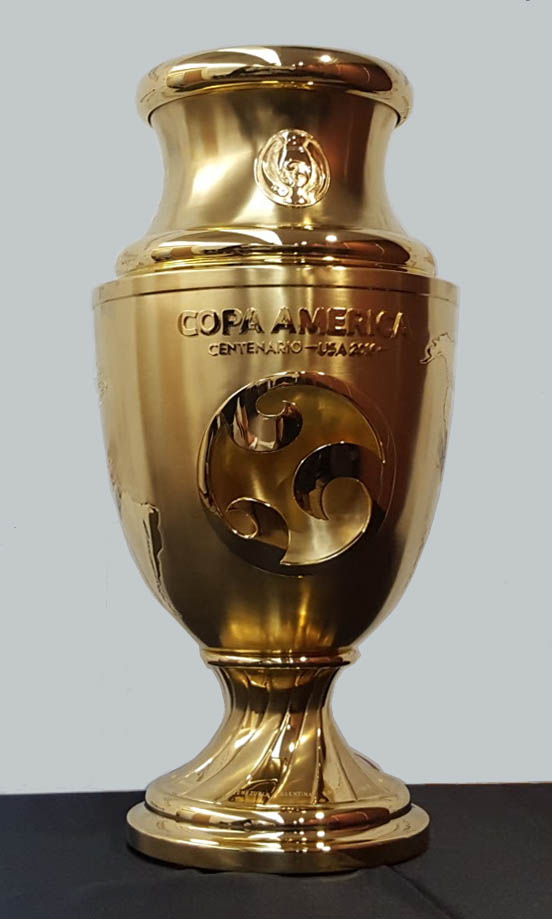
The trophy was designed exclusively for this edition

A new trophy was supposed to be created for the tournament and was to be unveiled on July 4, 2015, at the 2015 Copa América final. No trophy was unveiled amidst the FIFA corruption scandal. However, CONMEBOL announced that, on April 28, 2016, a presentation for the trophy would take place in Bogotá, Colombia and that it would be made by British trophy makers, Thomas Lyte.

On April 28, 2016, it was explained on the Copa América website that the "new" trophy was in fact commemorative, and would only be given to the winning country to keep, while the original silver trophy would continue to be awarded to each winner of the tournament (including the 2016 winner). The Centenario trophy retains the silhouette of the original trophy's Grecian urn, but is plated in matte gold. The front of the trophy is adorned with a raised (and in the case of some parts of the logo, engraved) image of the Copa América Centenario wordmark and logo. On each side are raised and polished images of a connected North and South America, commemorating the first Copa América held outside South America. Instead of the traditional wooden base holding the names of all past winners, the base of the Centenario commemorative trophy includes 16 zones, in which the names of all 16 nations are engraved. Other details include: The logos of both CONMEBOL and CONCACAF (the two confederations with representatives in the tournament), the years "1916–2016" (commemorating the 100 years of CONMEBOL and Copa América), and the phrases "La Copa del Siglo" ("The Cup of the Century") and "Uniting the Americas".

== Host selection ==
Luis Chiriboga, the President of the Ecuadorian Football Federation, stated the United States and Mexico were potential hosts of at least one stage of the competition. Hawit preferred the competition to be hosted in the United States for financial reasons, stating that "the market is in the United States, the stadiums are in the United States, the people are in the United States. The study that we have made [shows] that everything's in the United States." In July 2012, CONCACAF President Jeffrey Webb stated there was much organizing to be done.

On May 1, 2014, it was announced that the tournament would be held in the United States from June 3–26, 2016.

The decision to select the U.S. as a host was the object of criticism by Uruguay Football Association president Wilmar Valdez on June 7, 2016, who complained that the U.S. is "a country where they don't feel football", which "brings about problems." The complaint was voiced after Uruguay's defeat against Mexico, in favor of whom, he said, the event was biased. Just prior to the game itself, the Chilean anthem was mistakenly played instead of the Uruguayan anthem.

== Venues ==
On January 8, 2015, CONCACAF and CONMEBOL announced the 24 U.S. metropolitan areas which had indicated interest in hosting matches.

The stadiums were chosen following a bidding process, with the minimum capacity to be 50,000. The final list of venues, anticipated to number between 8 and 13, was to be announced in May 2015. However, the list was not released and speculation regarding whether the tournament would be able to move forward arose because Interpol red notices were issued for the former presidents of the CONMEBOL and CONCACAF confederations in relation to the 2015 FIFA corruption case, including allegations that they accepted significant bribes in relation to the $112.5 million broadcasting deal for the event. However, officials from CONMEBOL expressed a desire to move forward with the event despite the scandal.

On November 19, 2015, the ten venues selected for the tournament were announced by CONCACAF, CONMEBOL, and the U.S. Soccer Federation.

Pasadena, California (Los Angeles Area)	East Rutherford, New Jersey (New York City Area)	Houston, Texas	Philadelphia, Pennsylvania
Rose Bowl	MetLife Stadium	NRG Stadium	Lincoln Financial Field
Capacity: 92,542	Capacity: 82,566	Capacity: 71,000	Capacity: 69,176
Foxborough, Massachusetts (Boston Area)	Copa América Centenario is located in the United States		Santa Clara, California (San Francisco Bay Area)
Gillette Stadium	Copa América Centenario is located in the United States		Levi's Stadium
Capacity: 68,756	Copa América Centenario is located in the United States		Capacity: 68,500
Seattle, Washington	Chicago, Illinois	Glendale, Arizona (Phoenix Area)	Orlando, Florida
CenturyLink Field	Soldier Field	University of Phoenix Stadium	Camping World Stadium
Capacity: 67,000	Capacity: 63,500	Capacity: 63,400	Capacity: 60,219

== Participating teams ==
At the official announcement of the tournament, CONMEBOL and CONCACAF confirmed that all ten CONMEBOL members would be joined by six CONCACAF teams in the tournament. Among CONCACAF teams, the United States and Mexico automatically qualified. The other four spots were given to Costa Rica, the champion of the Central American Football Union by winning the 2014 Copa Centroamericana; Jamaica, the champion of the Caribbean Football Union by winning the 2014 Caribbean Cup; and Haiti and Panama, the two playoff winners among the four highest finishers in the 2015 CONCACAF Gold Cup not already qualified.

CONMEBOL (10 teams)	CONCACAF (6 teams)
Argentina; Bolivia; Brazil; Chile (title holders); Colombia; Ecuador; Paraguay; Peru; Uruguay; Venezuela	United States (hosts); Mexico (automatic qualifier); Costa Rica (winners of 2014 Copa Centroamericana); Jamaica (winners of 2014 Caribbean Cup); Haiti (qualified via playoffs); Panama (qualified via playoffs)

== Draw ==
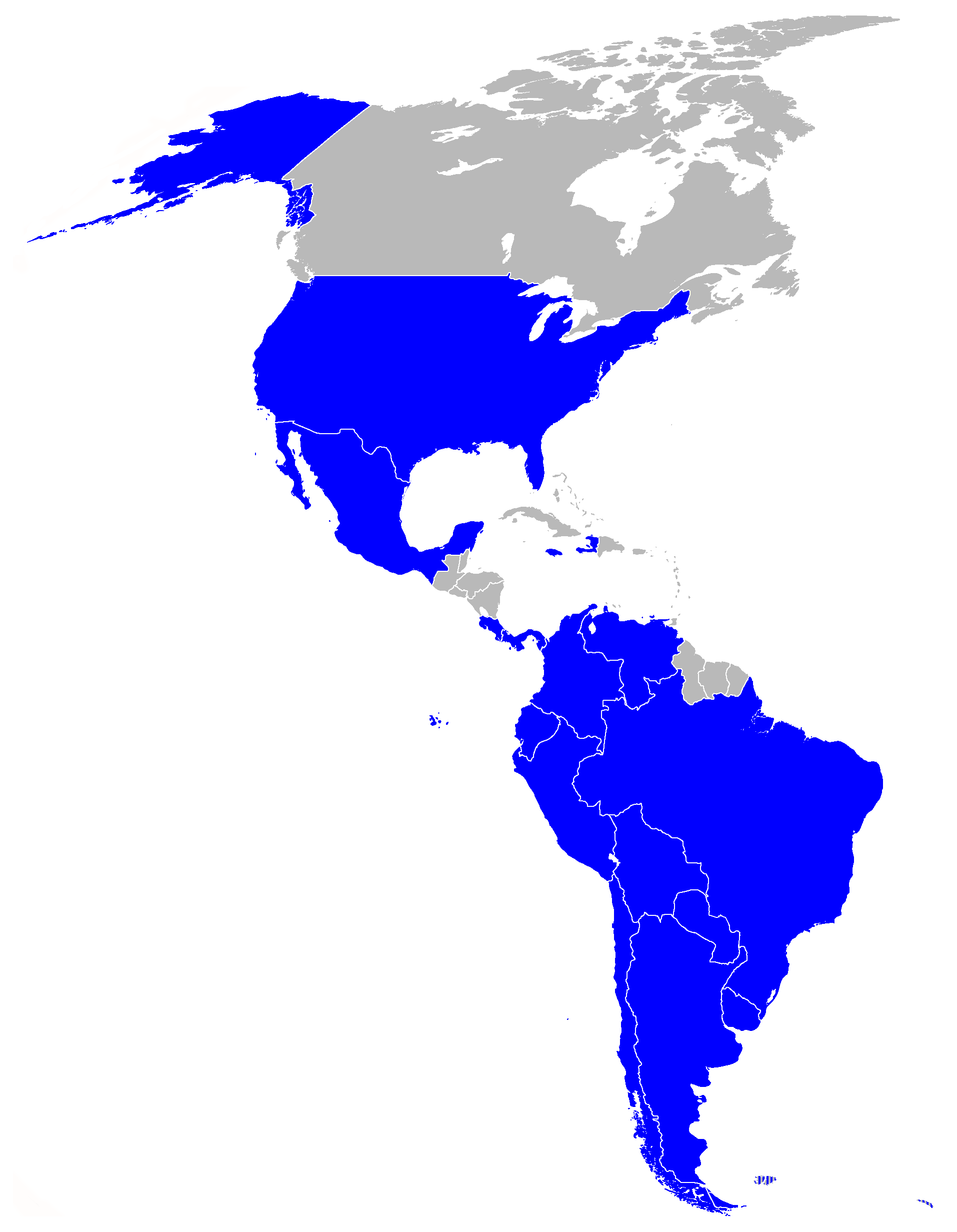
Map of the participant countries.

The group seeds and schedule were announced on December 17, 2015. The United States (Group A) was seeded as host, while Argentina (Group D) was seeded as the highest FIFA-ranked team in the CONMEBOL region during December 2015. According to Soccer United Marketing, Brazil (Group B) and Mexico (Group C) were seeded as they were "the most decorated nations in the last 100 years in international competitions from their respective confederations". However, there was criticism for not including Uruguay, which won two World Cups and was the Copa América all-time leader with 15 championships, or Chile, which was the defending Copa América champion going into the tournament.

The draw took place on February 21, 2016, at 7:30 pm EST, at the Hammerstein Ballroom in New York City. Teams were seeded using the FIFA Ranking from December 2015.

Pot 1	Pot 2	Pot 3	Pot 4
Argentina (1); Brazil (6); Mexico (22); United States (32) (hosts)	Chile (3); Colombia (8); Uruguay (11); Ecuador (13)	Costa Rica (37); Jamaica (54); Panama (64); Haiti (77)	Paraguay (46); Peru (47); Bolivia (68); Venezuela (83)

The four group pots contained four positions each, one from each group, as follows:

Pot 1	A1	B1	C1	D1
Pot 2	A2	B2	C2	D2
Pot 3	A3	B3	C3	D3
Pot 4	A4	B4	C4	D4

== Squads ==
Each country had a final squad of 23 players (three of whom had to be goalkeepers) which had to be submitted before the deadline of May 20, 2016.

== Match officials ==
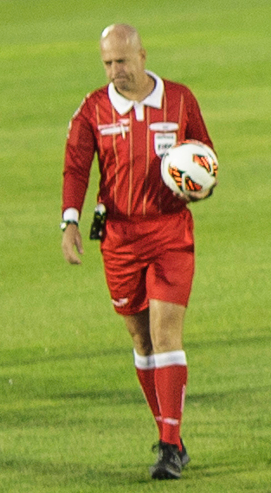
Héber Lopes was chosen as the referee for the final.

Country	Referee	Assistant referees	Matches officiated
Argentina	Patricio Loustau	Ezequiel Brailovsky; Ariel Mariano Scime	Costa Rica–Paraguay (Group A); Uruguay–Venezuela (Group C); Peru–Colombia (Quarterfinals)
Bolivia	Gery Vargas	Javier Bustillos; Juan Pablo Montaño	Ecuador–Haiti (Group B)
Brazil	Héber Lopes	Kléber Gil; Bruno Boschilia	Colombia–Paraguay (Group A); Mexico–Chile (Quarterfinals); Argentina–Chile (Final)
Brazil	Wilton Sampaio	(Argentina) Gustavo Rossi (Colombia) Alexander Léon	Mexico–Jamaica (Group C)
Chile	Julio Bascuñán	Carlos Astroza; Christian Schiemann	Brazil–Ecuador (Group B); United States–Paraguay (Group A)
Colombia	Wilmar Roldán	Alexander Guzmán; Wilmar Navarro	Ecuador–Peru (Group B); United States–Ecuador (Quarterfinals)
Colombia	Wilson Lamouroux	Alexander Guzmán (United States) Corey Parker	Uruguay–Jamaica (Group C)
Costa Rica	Ricardo Montero	Octavio Jara; Juan Mora	Panama–Bolivia (Group D)
Cuba	Yadel Martínez	(Canada) Joe Fletcher (Paraguay) Darío Gaona	Mexico–Venezuela (Group C)
Ecuador	Roddy Zambrano	Luis Vera; Byron Romero	United States–Costa Rica (Group A); Chile–Panama (Group D)
El Salvador	Joel Aguilar	Juan Zumba; William Torres	Argentina–Panama (Group D); Colombia–Chile (Semifinals)
Mexico	Roberto García	José Luis Camargo; Alberto Morín	United States–Colombia (Group A); Argentina–Venezuela (Quarterfinals)
Panama	John Pitti	Gabriel Victoria (Honduras) Cristian Ramírez	Haiti–Peru (Group B)
Paraguay	Enrique Cáceres	Eduardo Cardozo; Milciades Saldívar	Mexico–Uruguay (Group C); United States–Argentina (Semifinals)
Peru	Víctor Carrillo	Jorge Luis Yupanqui Namuche; Coty Carrera	Jamaica–Venezuela (Group C); Argentina–Bolivia (Group D)
United States	Mark Geiger	Charles Morgante (Canada) Joe Fletcher	Brazil–Haiti (Group B)
United States	Jair Marrufo	Peter Manikowski; Corey Rockwell	Chile–Bolivia (Group D)
Uruguay	Daniel Fedorczuk	Nicolás Taran; Richard Trinidad	Argentina–Chile (Group D); United States–Colombia (Third place playoff)
Uruguay	Andrés Cunha	Nicolás Taran; Richard Trinidad	Brazil–Peru (Group B)
Venezuela	José Argote	Luis Murillo; Luis Alfonso Sánchez Pérez	Colombia–Costa Rica (Group A)

Country	Fourth official
Brazil	Wilton Sampaio
Colombia	Wilson Lamouroux
United States	Armando Villarreal
Uruguay	Daniel Fedorczuk

Country	Reserve assistant referee
Argentina	Gustavo Fabián Rossi Fagivoli
Colombia	John Alexander León Sánchez
Paraguay	Darío Antonio Gaona Rodríguez
United States	Corey Parker

== Opening ceremony ==
The opening ceremony of Copa América Centenario took place at Levi's Stadium in Santa Clara 9:00 pm EDT (UTC−4) on June 3, 2016, ahead of the opening match and featured musical performances by Colombian singer J Balvin, American singer Jason Derulo, and the Canadian band Magic!

== Group stage ==
Group stage Quarterfinals Fourth place Third place Runner-up Champion

All times are EDT (UTC−4). The top two teams from each group advanced to the quarterfinals.

=== Tiebreakers ===
The ranking of each team in each group was determined as follows:

1. Greatest number of points obtained in all group matches
2. Goal difference in all group matches
3. Greatest number of goals scored in all group matches
4. If two or more teams were equal on the basis of the above three criteria, their rankings would further be determined as follows:
  1. Greatest number of points obtained in the group matches between the teams concerned
  2. Goal difference resulting from the group matches between the teams concerned
  3. Greater number of goals scored in all group matches between the teams concerned
  4. Drawing of lots

=== Group A ===
Pos	Team	Pld	W	D	L	GF	GA	GD	Pts	Qualification
1	United States (H)	3	2	0	1	5	2	+3	6	Advance to knockout stage
2	Colombia	3	2	0	1	6	4	+2	6	Advance to knockout stage
3	Costa Rica	3	1	1	1	3	6	−3	4	
4	Paraguay	3	0	1	2	1	3	−2	1	

Source: CONMEBOL & CONCACAF
(H) Hosts
June 3, 2016
9:30 p.m.

United States	0–2	Colombia
	Report (CONMEBOL); Report (CONCACAF)	C. Zapata 8'; Rodríguez 42' (pen.)

Levi's Stadium, Santa Clara, California
Attendance: 67,439
Referee: Roberto García (Mexico)
June 4, 2016
5:00 p.m.

Costa Rica	0–0	Paraguay
	Report (CONMEBOL); Report (CONCACAF)

Camping World Stadium, Orlando, Florida
Attendance: 14,334
Referee: Patricio Loustau (Argentina)

June 7, 2016
8:00 p.m.

United States	4–0	Costa Rica
Dempsey 9' (pen.); Jones 37'; Wood 42'; Zusi 87'	Report (CONMEBOL); Report (CONCACAF)

Soldier Field, Chicago, Illinois
Attendance: 39,642
Referee: Roddy Zambrano (Ecuador)
June 7, 2016
10:30 p.m.

Colombia	2–1	Paraguay
Bacca 12'; Rodríguez 30'	Report (CONMEBOL); Report (CONCACAF)	Ayala 71'

Rose Bowl, Pasadena, California
Attendance: 42,766
Referee: Héber Lopes (Brazil)

June 11, 2016
7:00 p.m.

United States	1–0	Paraguay
Dempsey 27'	Report (CONMEBOL); Report (CONCACAF)

Lincoln Financial Field, Philadelphia, Pennsylvania
Attendance: 51,041
Referee: Julio Bascuñán (Chile)
June 11, 2016
9:00 p.m.

Colombia	2–3	Costa Rica
Fabra 6'; M. Moreno 73'	Report (CONMEBOL); Report (CONCACAF)	Venegas 2'; Fabra 34' (o.g.); Borges 58'

NRG Stadium, Houston, Texas
Attendance: 45,808
Referee: José Argote (Venezuela)

=== Group B ===
Pos	Team	Pld	W	D	L	GF	GA	GD	Pts	Qualification
1	Peru	3	2	1	0	4	2	+2	7	Advance to knockout stage
2	Ecuador	3	1	2	0	6	2	+4	5	Advance to knockout stage
3	Brazil	3	1	1	1	7	2	+5	4	
4	Haiti	3	0	0	3	1	12	−11	0	

Source: CONMEBOL & CONCACAF
June 4, 2016
7:30 p.m.

Haiti	0–1	Peru
	Report (CONMEBOL); Report (CONCACAF)	Guerrero 61'

CenturyLink Field, Seattle, Washington
Attendance: 20,190
Referee: John Pitti (Panama)
June 4, 2016
10:00 p.m.

Brazil	0–0	Ecuador
	Report (CONMEBOL); Report (CONCACAF)

Rose Bowl, Pasadena, California
Attendance: 53,158
Referee: Julio Bascuñán (Chile)

June 8, 2016
7:30 p.m.

Brazil	7–1	Haiti
Coutinho 14', 29', 90+2'; Renato Augusto 35', 86'; Gabriel Barbosa 59'; Lucas Lima 67'	Report (CONMEBOL); Report (CONCACAF)	Marcelin 70'

Camping World Stadium, Orlando, Florida
Attendance: 28,241
Referee: Mark Geiger (United States)
June 8, 2016
10:00 p.m.

Ecuador	2–2	Peru
E. Valencia 39'; Bolaños 49'	Report (CONMEBOL); Report (CONCACAF)	Cueva 5'; Flores 13'

University of Phoenix Stadium, Glendale, Arizona
Attendance: 11,937
Referee: Wilmar Roldán (Colombia)

June 12, 2016
6:30 p.m.

Ecuador	4–0	Haiti
E. Valencia 11'; J. Ayoví 20'; Noboa 57'; A. Valencia 78'	Report (CONMEBOL); Report (CONCACAF)

MetLife Stadium, East Rutherford, New Jersey
Attendance: 50,976
Referee: Gery Vargas (Bolivia)
June 12, 2016
8:30 p.m.

Brazil	0–1	Peru
	Report (CONMEBOL); Report (CONCACAF)	Ruidíaz 75'

Gillette Stadium, Foxborough, Massachusetts
Attendance: 36,187
Referee: Andrés Cunha (Uruguay)

=== Group C ===
Pos	Team	Pld	W	D	L	GF	GA	GD	Pts	Qualification
1	Mexico	3	2	1	0	6	2	+4	7	Advance to knockout stage
2	Venezuela	3	2	1	0	3	1	+2	7	Advance to knockout stage
3	Uruguay	3	1	0	2	4	4	0	3	
4	Jamaica	3	0	0	3	0	6	−6	0	

Source: CONMEBOL & CONCACAF
June 5, 2016
5:00 p.m.

Jamaica	0–1	Venezuela
	Report (CONMEBOL); Report (CONCACAF)	Martínez 15'

Soldier Field, Chicago, Illinois
Attendance: 25,560
Referee: Víctor Carrillo (Peru)
June 5, 2016
8:00 p.m.

Mexico	3–1	Uruguay
Á. Pereira 4' (o.g.); Márquez 85'; Herrera 90+2'	Report (CONMEBOL); Report (CONCACAF)	Godín 74'

University of Phoenix Stadium, Glendale, Arizona
Attendance: 60,025
Referee: Enrique Cáceres (Paraguay)

June 9, 2016
7:30 p.m.

Uruguay	0–1	Venezuela
	Report (CONMEBOL); Report (CONCACAF)	Rondón 36'

Lincoln Financial Field, Philadelphia, Pennsylvania
Attendance: 23,002
Referee: Patricio Loustau (Argentina)
June 9, 2016
10:00 p.m.

Mexico	2–0	Jamaica
Hernández 18'; Peralta 81'	Report (CONMEBOL); Report (CONCACAF)

Rose Bowl, Pasadena, California
Attendance: 83,263
Referee: Wilton Sampaio (Brazil)

June 13, 2016
8:00 p.m.

Mexico	1–1	Venezuela
J. Corona 80'	Report (CONMEBOL); Report (CONCACAF)	Velázquez 10'

NRG Stadium, Houston, Texas
Attendance: 67,319
Referee: Yadel Martínez (Cuba)
June 13, 2016
10:00 p.m.

Uruguay	3–0	Jamaica
Hernández 21'; Watson 66' (o.g.); Corujo 88'	Report (CONMEBOL); Report (CONCACAF)

Levi's Stadium, Santa Clara, California
Attendance: 40,166
Referee: Wilson Lamouroux (Colombia)

=== Group D ===
Pos	Team	Pld	W	D	L	GF	GA	GD	Pts	Qualification
1	Argentina	3	3	0	0	10	1	+9	9	Advance to knockout stage
2	Chile	3	2	0	1	7	5	+2	6	Advance to knockout stage
3	Panama	3	1	0	2	4	10	−6	3	
4	Bolivia	3	0	0	3	2	7	−5	0	

Source: CONMEBOL & CONCACAF
June 6, 2016
7:00 p.m.

Panama	2–1	Bolivia
Pérez 11', 87'	Report (CONMEBOL); Report (CONCACAF)	Arce 54'

Camping World Stadium, Orlando, Florida
Attendance: 13,466
Referee: Ricardo Montero (Costa Rica)
June 6, 2016
10:00 p.m.

Argentina	2–1	Chile
Di María 51'; Banega 59'	Report (CONMEBOL); Report (CONCACAF)	Fuenzalida 90+3'

Levi's Stadium, Santa Clara, California
Attendance: 69,451
Referee: Daniel Fedorczuk (Uruguay)

June 10, 2016
7:00 p.m.

Chile	2–1	Bolivia
Vidal 46', 90+10' (pen.)	Report (CONMEBOL); Report (CONCACAF)	Campos 61'

Gillette Stadium, Foxborough, Massachusetts
Attendance: 19,392
Referee: Jair Marrufo (United States)
June 10, 2016
9:30 p.m.

Argentina	5–0	Panama
Otamendi 7'; Messi 68', 78', 87'; Agüero 90'	Report (CONMEBOL); Report (CONCACAF)

Soldier Field, Chicago, Illinois
Attendance: 53,885
Referee: Joel Aguilar (El Salvador)

June 14, 2016
8:00 p.m.

Chile	4–2	Panama
Vargas 15', 43'; Sánchez 50', 89'	Report (CONMEBOL); Report (CONCACAF)	Camargo 5'; Arroyo 75'

Lincoln Financial Field, Philadelphia, Pennsylvania
Attendance: 27,260
Referee: Roddy Zambrano (Ecuador)
June 14, 2016
10:00 p.m.

Argentina	3–0	Bolivia
Lamela 13'; Lavezzi 15'; Cuesta 32'	Report (CONMEBOL); Report (CONCACAF)

CenturyLink Field, Seattle, Washington
Attendance: 45,753
Referee: Víctor Carrillo (Peru)

== Knockout stage ==
In the quarter-finals, semi-finals, and third-place match of the knockout stage, a penalty shoot-out was used to decide the winner if tied after 90 minutes. In the final, extra time and a penalty shoot-out were to be used to decide the winner if necessary. Should the final enter extra time, a fourth substitute would be allowed as part of FIFA's approval of rule changes based on IFAB's new regulations, but although the final was eventually decided on penalties neither finalist ended up taking advantage of this rule.

=== Bracket ===
Quarter-finals
June 16 – Seattle, WA
United States	2
Ecuador	1
June 18 – Foxborough, MA
Argentina	4
Venezuela	1
June 17 – East Rutherford, NJ
Peru	0 (2)
Colombia (p)	0 (4)
June 18 – Santa Clara, CA
Mexico	0
Chile	7

Semi-finals
June 21 – Houston, TX
United States	0
Argentina	4
June 22 – Chicago, IL
Colombia	0
Chile	2

Final
June 26 – East Rutherford, NJ
Argentina	0 (2)
Chile (p)	0 (4)
Third place play-off
June 25 – Glendale, AZ
United States	0
Colombia	1

=== Quarter-finals ===
June 16, 2016
9:30 p.m.

United States	2–1	Ecuador
Dempsey 22'; Zardes 65'	Report (CONMEBOL); Report (CONCACAF)	Arroyo 74'

CenturyLink Field, Seattle, Washington
Attendance: 47,322
Referee: Wilmar Roldán (Colombia)

June 17, 2016
8:00 p.m.

Peru	0–0	Colombia
	Report (CONMEBOL); Report (CONCACAF)
Penalties
Ruidíaz (penalty scored); Tapia (penalty scored); Trauco (penalty missed); Cueva (penalty missed)	2–4	(penalty scored) Rodríguez; (penalty scored) Cuadrado; (penalty scored) D. Moreno; (penalty scored) Pérez

MetLife Stadium, East Rutherford, New Jersey
Attendance: 79,194
Referee: Patricio Loustau (Argentina)

June 18, 2016
7:00 p.m.

Argentina	4–1	Venezuela
Higuaín 8', 28'; Messi 60'; Lamela 71'	Report (CONMEBOL); Report (CONCACAF)	Rondón 70'

Gillette Stadium, Foxborough, Massachusetts
Attendance: 59,183
Referee: Roberto García (Mexico)

June 18, 2016
10:00 p.m.

Mexico	0–7	Chile
	Report (CONMEBOL); Report (CONCACAF)	Puch 15', 87'; Vargas 43', 51', 57', 73'; Sánchez 48'

Levi's Stadium, Santa Clara, California
Attendance: 70,547
Referee: Héber Lopes (Brazil)

=== Semi-finals ===
June 21, 2016
9:00 p.m.

United States	0–4	Argentina
	Report (CONMEBOL); Report (CONCACAF)	Lavezzi 3'; Messi 32'; Higuaín 50', 86'

NRG Stadium, Houston, Texas
Attendance: 70,858
Referee: Enrique Cáceres (Paraguay)

June 22, 2016
8:00 p.m.

Colombia	0–2	Chile
	Report (CONMEBOL); Report (CONCACAF)	Aránguiz 6'; Fuenzalida 10'

Soldier Field, Chicago, Illinois
Attendance: 55,423
Referee: Joel Aguilar (El Salvador)

=== Third place play-off ===
June 25, 2016
8:00 p.m.

United States	0–1	Colombia
	Report (CONMEBOL); Report (CONCACAF)	Bacca 31'

University of Phoenix Stadium, Glendale, Arizona
Attendance: 29,041
Referee: Daniel Fedorczuk (Uruguay)

=== Final ===
June 26, 2016
8:00 p.m.

Argentina	0–0 (a.e.t.)	Chile
	Report (CONMEBOL); Report (CONCACAF)
Penalties
Messi (penalty missed); Mascherano (penalty scored); Agüero (penalty scored); Biglia (penalty missed)	2–4	(penalty missed) Vidal; (penalty scored) Castillo; (penalty scored) Aránguiz; (penalty scored) Beausejour; (penalty scored) Silva

MetLife Stadium, East Rutherford, New Jersey
Attendance: 82,026
Referee: Héber Lopes (Brazil)

== Statistics ==
=== Goalscorers ===
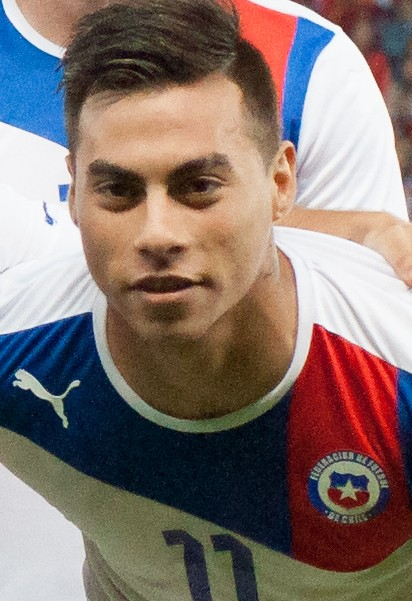
Eduardo Vargas was the top scorer of the tournament with 6 goals.

Chile's Eduardo Vargas received the Golden Boot award for scoring six goals. There were 91 goals scored in 32 matches, for an average of 2.84 goals per match.

6 goals

- (Chile) Eduardo Vargas

5 goals

- (Argentina) Lionel Messi

4 goals

- (Argentina) Gonzalo Higuaín

3 goals

- (Brazil) Philippe Coutinho
- (Chile) Alexis Sánchez
- (United States) Clint Dempsey

2 goals

- (Argentina) Ezequiel Lavezzi
- (Argentina) Erik Lamela
- (Brazil) Renato Augusto
- (Chile) José Pedro Fuenzalida
- (Chile) Edson Puch
- (Chile) Arturo Vidal
- (Colombia) Carlos Bacca
- (Colombia) James Rodríguez
- (Ecuador) Enner Valencia
- (Panama) Blas Pérez
- (Venezuela) Salomón Rondón

1 goal

- (Argentina) Sergio Agüero
- (Argentina) Éver Banega
- (Argentina) Víctor Cuesta
- (Argentina) Ángel Di María
- (Argentina) Nicolás Otamendi
- (Bolivia) Juan Carlos Arce
- (Bolivia) Jhasmani Campos
- (Brazil) Gabriel Barbosa
- (Brazil) Lucas Lima
- (Chile) Charles Aránguiz
- (Colombia) Frank Fabra
- (Colombia) Marlos Moreno
- (Colombia) Cristián Zapata
- (Costa Rica) Celso Borges
- (Costa Rica) Johan Venegas
- (Ecuador) Michael Arroyo
- (Ecuador) Jaime Ayoví
- (Ecuador) Miller Bolaños
- (Ecuador) Christian Noboa
- (Ecuador) Antonio Valencia
- (Haiti) James Marcelin
- (Mexico) Jesús Manuel Corona
- (Mexico) Javier Hernández
- (Mexico) Héctor Herrera
- (Mexico) Rafael Márquez
- (Mexico) Oribe Peralta
- (Panama) Abdiel Arroyo
- (Panama) Miguel Camargo
- (Paraguay) Víctor Ayala
- (Peru) Christian Cueva
- (Peru) Edison Flores
- (Peru) Paolo Guerrero
- (Peru) Raúl Ruidíaz
- (United States) Jermaine Jones
- (United States) Bobby Wood
- (United States) Gyasi Zardes
- (United States) Graham Zusi
- (Uruguay) Mathías Corujo
- (Uruguay) Diego Godín
- (Uruguay) Abel Hernández
- (Venezuela) Josef Martínez
- (Venezuela) José Manuel Velázquez

1 own goal

- (Colombia) Frank Fabra (against Costa Rica)
- (Jamaica) Je-Vaughn Watson (against Uruguay)
- (Uruguay) Álvaro Pereira (against Mexico)

== Awards ==
=== Winners ===
2016 Copa América Centenario champions

Chile
2nd title

=== Individual awards ===
The following awards were given at the conclusion of the tournament.

- Golden Ball Award: (Chile) Alexis Sánchez
- Golden Boot Award: (Chile) Eduardo Vargas (6 goals)
- Golden Glove Award: (Chile) Claudio Bravo
- Fair Play Award: Argentina

=== Final Man of the Match Award ===
- (Chile) Claudio Bravo

=== Team of the Tournament ===
The Technical Study Group announced the tournament's Best XI squad.

Goalkeeper	Defenders	Midfielders	Forwards
(Chile) Claudio Bravo	(Chile) Mauricio Isla (Argentina) Nicolás Otamendi (Chile) Gary Medel (Chile) Jean Beausejour	(Argentina) Javier Mascherano (Chile) Arturo Vidal (Chile) Charles Aránguiz	(Argentina) Lionel Messi (Chile) Eduardo Vargas (Chile) Alexis Sánchez

== Marketing ==
=== Sponsorship ===
Sponsors

- Anheuser-Busch InBev (Bud Light, Budweiser)
- The Coca-Cola Company (Coca-Cola, Powerade)
- Delta Air Lines (Aeromexico, Gol Transportes Aereos)
- Ford Motor Company
- Makita
- MasterCard
- Nike, Inc.
- Procter & Gamble (Crest, Gillette, Head & Shoulders, Old Spice, Oral-B)
- PPG Industries (Comex Group, Glidden, Olympus, Renner)
- Samsung Electronics
- Scotiabank (Colpatria)
- State Farm Insurance
- Sprint Corporation (Boost Mobile, Virgin Mobile USA)
- TAG Heuer
- Total S.A.

=== Match ball ===
The Nike Ordem Ciento was announced as the official Copa América Centenario match ball on February 21, 2016. The mainly white ball has red brush stroke decoration. It shows the official Copa América Centenario logo.

The Nike Ordem Campeón was used for the final match, in which golden brushes replaced the red ones.

=== Theme songs ===
- "Superstar" by American rapper Pitbull featuring Becky G is the official song of the tournament and both artists performed the song during the Final.
- "Breaking All the Rules" by English rock musician Peter Frampton, who performed the song during the Final.
- "In My City" by Indian Singer Priyanka Chopra, who also performed the song during the Final.

== Broadcasting rights ==
=== CONMEBOL and CONCACAF ===
Country	Broadcaster	Ref.
Latin America	DirecTV Sports	
Argentina	Televisión Pública Argentina (Argentina matches only), TyC Sports (all matches)	
Bolivia	TV Boliviana (all matches)	
Brazil	Rede Globo (Brazil matches only), SporTV (all matches)	
Canada	Univision Canada (Spanish)	
Chile	Canal 13	
Colombia	RCN TV, Caracol TV	
Costa Rica	Repretel, Teletica	
Cuba	Cubavision International	
Ecuador	Gama TV	
Haiti	CONATEL, Tele Haiti	
Jamaica	CVM TV	
Mexico	Televisa, TV Azteca	
Panama	Telemetro, TVMax, RPC-TV	
Paraguay	Paraguay TV, Unicanal	
Peru	América Televisión	
United States	Fox Sports (English); Univision (Spanish)	
Uruguay	DirecTV, Equital (Monte Cable, Nuevo Siglo, TCC)	
Venezuela	Meridiano TV	

=== Rest of the world ===
Country	Broadcaster	Ref.
Arab World: Algeria; Bahrain; Comoros; Djibouti; Egypt; Iraq; Jordan; Kuwait; Lebanon; Libya; Mauritania; Morocco; Oman; Palestine; Qatar; Saudi Arabia; Somalia; Sudan; Syria; Tunisia; United Arab Emirates; Yemen	beIN Sports	
Australia	beIN Sports, SBS	
Azerbaijan	CBC Sport	
Western Balkans: Bosnia and Herzegovina; Croatia; Republic of Macedonia; Montenegro; Serbia	Arena Sport	
Baltics: Estonia; Latvia; Lithuania	Viasat Sport Baltic	
China	SMG, LeSports, PPTV, QQLive	
Equatorial Guinea	RTVGE, Asonga TV, Canal+	
Finland	Viasat	
France	beIN Sports	
Germany	Sat.1, Kabel eins	
Greece	Skai TV	
Hong Kong	now TV, ViuTV	
Hungary	Sport TV	
Iceland	Stöð 2 Sport	
India	Sony ESPN, Sony ESPN HD	
Indonesia	Kompas TV	
Iran	IRIB Varzesh	
Ireland	Setanta Ireland	
Israel	Sport 1	
Italy	Sky Italia	
Japan	SKY PerfecTV!	
Kenya	Startimes, Canal+	
Malaysia	Astro	
Myanmar	Sky Net	
Netherlands	Fox Sports Netherlands, NOS	
New Zealand	Sky Sport	
Nigeria	Startimes, Canal+	
Norway	Viaplay	
Poland	TVP	
Portugal	TVI	
Russia	Match TV	
Singapore	StarHub TV, Singtel TV	
South Africa	Startimes	
South Korea	KBS	
Spain	Movistar+	
Sub-Saharan Africa	Startimes, Canal+	
Sweden	Viasat Sport	
Taiwan	CTV, TTV, CTi TV	
Tajikistan	TV Varzish	
Thailand	True Visions	
Turkey	A Spor, A Haber	
United Kingdom	Premier Sports	
Vietnam	SCTV, VTVCab	

== Controversies ==
=== National anthems, country names, and flags ===
On June 5, during the pre-match ceremony between Mexico and Uruguay, the national anthem of Chile was played for Uruguay. Many Uruguayan players seemed confused. The correct anthem was never played. Copa América organizers released the following statement via Twitter:

This evening during the pre-match ceremony, due to human error, we inadvertently played the incorrect National Anthem [sic]. We sincerely apologize to the Uruguayan Federation, the Uruguay National Team, the people of Uruguay and to the fans for this mistake. We will work with all parties involved to ensure such an error this does not occur again.

Uruguayan midfielder Diego Fagúndez said the incident showed "much disrespect".

On June 6, Colombian nationals heavily criticized Adidas for misspelling the country name in an advertisement, substituting "Columbia" for "Colombia". The company said in a statement: "We value our partnership with the Colombian Football Federation and apologize for our mistake. We removed the graphics and are quickly installing new versions."

Also on June 6, before the game between Panama and Bolivia, the video screens of the Citrus Bowl in Orlando displayed the flags of both countries, but Bolivia's was inverted.

=== Match officiating ===
On June 4, during the game between Ecuador and Brazil, the assistant referee called the ball out prior to a cross that led to the ball going into the net for Ecuador. Brazilian goalkeeper Alisson dropped the ball, and it went over the line into his own goal. The replays seemed to show the ball was not completely out of bounds before being crossed, but the goal did not stand. The match ended in a 0–0 draw.

On June 10, during the game between Chile and Bolivia, a penalty kick was awarded to Chile after Luis Alberto Gutiérrez was whistled for a handball. The assistant referee made the call, but it appeared that Gutiérrez had tucked his arm behind his back, and the ball hit off his shoulder. Arturo Vidal converted the ensuing penalty at the 90'+10' mark (eight minutes of stoppage time were added to the second half due to an injury to Ronald Eguino) to secure the three points for Chile.

On June 12, during the game between Peru and Brazil, Raúl Ruidíaz scored by guiding the ball into the net with his arm. After a lengthy discussion between the referee and his assistant, the goal was allowed to stand, and Brazil went on to lose 1–0, resulting in their elimination from the tournament. However, Raúl Ruidíaz claimed the ball hit his thigh rather than his hand and said the goal was 'thanks to God' rather than another hand of God.

=== Ticket pricing ===
The tournament's organizers have been criticized for setting high ticket prices that have resulted in under-capacity crowds in Seattle and Chicago for United States matches. The average price for a sold ticket during the group stage was $144; some matches saw average prices as high as $236 and as low as $37.

== See also ==
- Soccer in the United States
- Football at the Pan American Games
