= Copa América Centenario Group A =

Football tournament group stage

Group A of the Copa América Centenario consisted of hosts United States, Colombia, Costa Rica, and Paraguay. Matches began on June 3 and ended on June 11, 2016. All times are EDT (UTC−4).

The United States and Colombia advanced to the quarter-finals.

== Teams ==
Draw position	Team	Confederation	Method of qualification	Finals appearance	Last appearance	Previous best performance	FIFA Rankings	
Draw position	Team	Confederation	Method of qualification	Finals appearance	Last appearance	Previous best performance	December 2015 (Note: The rankings of December 2015 were used for seeding for the final draw, except for certain cases.)	June 2016
A1 (seed)	United States	CONCACAF	Hosts	4th	2007	Fourth Place (1995)	32	31
A2	Colombia	CONMEBOL	Automatic qualifier	21st	2015	Winners (2001)	8	3
A3	Costa Rica	CONCACAF	2014 Copa Centroamericana champions	5th	2011	Quarter-finals (2001 and 2004)	37	23
A4	Paraguay	CONMEBOL	Automatic qualifier	36th	2015	Winners (1953 and 1979)	46	44

== Standings ==
Pos	Team	Pld	W	D	L	GF	GA	GD	Pts	Qualification
1	United States (H)	3	2	0	1	5	2	+3	6	Advance to knockout stage
2	Colombia	3	2	0	1	6	4	+2	6	Advance to knockout stage
3	Costa Rica	3	1	1	1	3	6	−3	4	
4	Paraguay	3	0	1	2	1	3	−2	1	

Source: CONMEBOL & CONCACAF
Rules for classification: Group stage tiebreakers
(H) Hosts

In the quarter-finals:

- The winner of Group A, United States, advanced to play the runner-up of Group B, Ecuador.
- The runner-up of Group A, Colombia, advanced to play the winner of Group B, Peru.

== Matches ==
=== United States vs Colombia ===
The two teams had met in seventeen previous encounters, the last being a friendly held in 2014 at Craven Cottage in London, a match won by Colombia 2–1. Both teams had also met in two Copa América editions: the 1995 third-place match, won by Colombia 4–1, and in a group stage match in 2007, also won by Colombia, with a lone goal by Jaime Castrillón.

Colombia won the match 0–2 with first-half goals scored by Cristián Zapata and James Rodríguez. United States' manager Jürgen Klinsmann stated that he was "pleased" with the performance of his team, he also saw the penalty as the "major point of the game", a remark to which American player Clint Dempsey agreed. Colombia's manager José Pekerman recognized the competitiveness of their rivals, but commented that "we could have scored a couple more."

June 3, 2016
9:30 p.m.

United States	0–2	Colombia
	Report (CONMEBOL); Report (CONCACAF)	C. Zapata 8'; Rodríguez 42' (pen.)

Levi's Stadium, Santa Clara, California
Attendance: 67,439
Referee: Roberto García (Mexico)

United States	Colombia

GK	1	Brad Guzan
RB	2	DeAndre Yedlin
CB	20	Geoff Cameron
CB	6	John Brooks
LB	23	Fabian Johnson
CM	11	Alejandro Bedoya	(yellow card) 57'	(substituted off) 86'
CM	4	Michael Bradley (c)
CM	13	Jermaine Jones		(substituted off) 66'
RF	9	Gyasi Zardes
CF	8	Clint Dempsey
LF	7	Bobby Wood		(substituted off) 66'
Substitutions:
FW	17	Christian Pulisic		(substituted on) 66'
MF	10	Darlington Nagbe		(substituted on) 66'
MF	19	Graham Zusi		(substituted on) 86'
Manager:
(Germany) Jürgen Klinsmann

GK	1	David Ospina
RB	4	Santiago Arias
CB	2	Cristián Zapata
CB	22	Jeison Murillo
LB	19	Farid Díaz
CM	13	Sebastián Pérez	(substituted off) 86'
CM	16	Dani Torres
RM	11	Juan Cuadrado
AM	10	James Rodríguez (c)	(substituted off) 73'
LM	8	Edwin Cardona
CF	7	Carlos Bacca	(substituted off) 88'
Substitutions:
MF	5	Guillermo Celis	(substituted on) 73'
MF	6	Carlos Sánchez	(substituted on) 86'
FW	17	Dayro Moreno	(substituted on) 88'
Manager:
(Argentina) José Pékerman

Man of the Match:
Cristián Zapata (Colombia)

Assistant referees:
José Luis Camargo (Mexico)
Alberto Morín (Mexico)
Fourth official:
Wilton Sampaio (Brazil)
Fifth official:
Kléber Lúcio Gil (Brazil)

=== Costa Rica vs Paraguay ===
The two teams had met in eight previous occasions, the last being a friendly in the Costa Rican national stadium in March 2015, resulting in a scoreless draw. In Copa América, both teams faced once, in a 2004 group stage match, won by Paraguay with a late penalty kick goal scored by Julio dos Santos.

Just as their previous friendly meeting, the game ended in a scoreless draw. Costa Rican manager Óscar Ramírez commented that it was "a two-faced match" and that "I would say we have lost two points". Paraguay's manager Ramón Díaz also though that his team lost two points; he was also critical of the hour chosen for the game, commenting that "I would like to take the actual protagonists, the players, in consideration".

Costa Rican player Kendall Waston was shown the red card in the stoppage time after a tackle against Nelson Valdez, becoming the first player to be sent-off in the tournament. Regarding the incident, Waston commented, "when I saw the red card I felt the world coming over me, because this tournament is very short and we all want to play".

June 4, 2016
5:00 p.m.

Costa Rica	0–0	Paraguay
	Report (CONMEBOL); Report (CONCACAF)

Camping World Stadium, Orlando, Florida
Attendance: 14,334
Referee: Patricio Loustau (Argentina)

Costa Rica	Paraguay

GK	18	Patrick Pemberton
CB	19	Kendall Waston	(red card) 90+4'
CB	2	Jhonny Acosta
CB	6	Óscar Duarte
RWB	16	Cristian Gamboa
LWB	22	Rónald Matarrita	(yellow card) 49'
CM	5	Celso Borges
CM	17	Yeltsin Tejeda	(yellow card) 1'	(substituted off) 59'
AM	10	Bryan Ruiz (c)		(substituted off) 78'
AM	12	Joel Campbell		(substituted off) 67'
CF	21	Marco Ureña
Substitutions:
MF	14	Randall Azofeifa		(substituted on) 59'
MF	11	Johan Venegas		(substituted on) 67'
MF	7	Christian Bolaños		(substituted on) 78'
Manager:
Óscar Ramírez

GK	1	Justo Villar (c)
RB	5	Bruno Valdez
CB	3	Gustavo Gómez
CB	14	Paulo da Silva
LB	6	Miguel Samudio
RM	10	Derlis González	(yellow card) 83'	(substituted off) 89'
CM	16	Celso Ortiz
CM	23	Robert Piris Da Motta
LM	21	Óscar Romero		(substituted off) 70'
CF	7	Jorge Benítez	(yellow card) 13'	(substituted off) 73'
CF	19	Dario Lezcano
Substitutions:
FW	11	Édgar Benítez		(substituted on) 70'
FW	18	Nelson Valdez	(yellow card) 79'	(substituted on) 73'
FW	15	Juan Iturbe		(substituted on) 89'
Manager:
(Argentina) Ramón Díaz

Man of the Match:
Gustavo Gómez (Paraguay)

Assistant referees:
Ezequiel Brailovsky (Argentina)
Ariel Scime (Argentina)
Fourth official:
Yadel Martínez (Cuba)
Fifth official:
Gustavo Rossi (Argentina)

=== United States vs Costa Rica ===
The two teams had met in thirty-three previous occasions, the last being a friendly held at the Red Bull Arena in Harrison, New Jersey, won by the Costa Rican side with a lone goal by Joel Campbell. This marked the first time both teams faced each other in a competitive match outside of CONCACAF official competitions. Before the match, the President of the United States Soccer Federarion (USSF) Sunil Gulati was interviewed on the status of U.S. manager Jurgen Klinsmann, saying, "Results are what matter. Everyone understands that. Results of the last 18 months, overall, haven't been what we would have hoped for. Especially in the official competitions." Many pundits took this to mean that Klinsmann's job was in jeopardy.

The United States got off to a flying start, with Bobby Wood drawing a penalty in the 9th minute that was converted by Clint Dempsey. Two other first half goals were scored by Wood and Jermaine Jones, and the scoring was finished by Graham Zusi late in the 2nd half. Zusi's goal would prove crucial in the long run, with the United States going on to win the group on goal difference.

June 7, 2016
8:00 p.m.

United States	4–0	Costa Rica
Dempsey 9' (pen.); Jones 37'; Wood 42'; Zusi 87'	Report (CONMEBOL); Report (CONCACAF)

Soldier Field, Chicago, Illinois
Attendance: 39,642
Referee: Roddy Zambrano (Ecuador)

United States	Costa Rica

GK	1	Brad Guzan
RB	2	DeAndre Yedlin
CB	20	Geoff Cameron
CB	6	John Brooks	(yellow card) 81'
LB	23	Fabian Johnson	(yellow card) 44'
CM	11	Alejandro Bedoya		(substituted off) 83'
CM	4	Michael Bradley (c)
CM	13	Jermaine Jones
RF	9	Gyasi Zardes
CF	8	Clint Dempsey		(substituted off) 78'
LF	7	Bobby Wood		(substituted off) 70'
Substitutions:
MF	19	Graham Zusi		(substituted on) 70'
FW	18	Chris Wondolowski		(substituted on) 78'
MF	15	Kyle Beckerman		(substituted on) 83'
Manager:
(Germany) Jürgen Klinsmann

GK	18	Patrick Pemberton
CB	6	Óscar Duarte
CB	2	Jhonny Acosta
CB	3	Francisco Calvo
RWB	16	Cristian Gamboa	(substituted off) 46'
LWB	22	Rónald Matarrita
DM	5	Celso Borges
RM	7	Christian Bolaños
LM	12	Joel Campbell	(substituted off) 46'
AM	10	Bryan Ruiz (c)
CF	21	Marco Ureña	(substituted off) 18'
Substitutions:
FW	9	Álvaro Saborío	(substituted on) 18'
DF	15	José Salvatierra	(substituted on) 46'
MF	14	Randall Azofeifa	(substituted on) 46'
Manager:
Óscar Ramírez

Man of the Match:
Jermaine Jones (United States)

Assistant referees:
Byron Romero (Ecuador)
Luis Vera (Ecuador)
Fourth official:
John Pitti (Panama)
Fifth official:
Gabriel Victoria (Panama)

=== Colombia vs Paraguay ===
The two teams had met in forty-two previous occasions, the last being a 2014 FIFA World Cup qualifying match held in Asunción, which the Colombian side won 2–1. In Copa América editions, they had not faced each other since a 2007 Copa América group stage match, won by Paraguay 5–0.

June 7, 2016
10:30 p.m.

Colombia	2–1	Paraguay
Bacca 12'; Rodríguez 30'	Report (CONMEBOL); Report (CONCACAF)	Ayala 71'

Rose Bowl, Pasadena, California
Attendance: 42,766
Referee: Héber Lopes (Brazil)

Colombia	Paraguay

GK	1	David Ospina
RB	4	Santiago Arias
CB	2	Cristián Zapata		(substituted off) 90'
CB	22	Jeison Murillo	(yellow card) 45+4'
LB	19	Farid Díaz
CM	13	Sebastián Pérez		(substituted off) 58'
CM	16	Dani Torres
RM	11	Juan Cuadrado		(substituted off) 87'
AM	10	James Rodríguez (c)
LM	8	Edwin Cardona
CF	7	Carlos Bacca
Substitutions:
MF	5	Guillermo Celis		(substituted on) 58'
FW	21	Marlos Moreno		(substituted on) 87'
DF	3	Yerry Mina		(substituted on) 90'
Manager:
(Argentina) José Pékerman

GK	1	Justo Villar (c)
RB	5	Bruno Valdez
CB	3	Gustavo Gómez
CB	14	Paulo da Silva
LB	6	Miguel Samudio
RM	21	Óscar Romero	(yellow card) 79' (yellow-red card) 81'
CM	23	Robert Piris Da Motta		(substituted off) 46'
CM	16	Celso Ortiz
LM	17	Miguel Almirón
CF	11	Édgar Benítez		(substituted off) 46'
CF	19	Dario Lezcano	(yellow card) 63'	(substituted off) 67'
Substitutions:
DF	20	Víctor Ayala		(substituted on) 46'
FW	7	Jorge Benítez		(substituted on) 46'
FW	9	Antonio Sanabria		(substituted on) 67'
Manager:
(Argentina) Ramón Díaz

Man of the Match:
James Rodríguez (Colombia)

Assistant referees:
Kléber Lúcio Gil (Brazil)
Bruno Boschilia (Brazil)
Fourth official:
Julio Bascuñán (Chile)
Fifth official:
Christian Schiemann (Chile)

=== United States vs Paraguay ===
The two teams had met in six previous occasions, the last being a friendly held at LP Field in 2011, won by Paraguay with a lone goal by Óscar Cardozo. In Copa América, they have faced once, a Paraguayan 3–1 victory in a 2007 group stage match. U.S. scored first, once again from Clint Dempsey on a cross from Gyasi Zardes. It would be the only goal of the game, but U.S. would not win without difficulty.

Early in the second half, DeAndre Yedlin was sent off following two yellow cards in quick succession, giving Paraguay a man advantage for almost 40 minutes. However, the United States defense held firm, mostly due to the efforts of John Brooks and Geoff Cameron. Following a shock victory by Costa Rica over Colombia, the United States ended up winning Group A.

June 11, 2016
7:00 p.m.

United States	1–0	Paraguay
Dempsey 27'	Report (CONMEBOL); Report (CONCACAF)

Lincoln Financial Field, Philadelphia, Pennsylvania
Attendance: 51,041
Referee: Julio Bascuñán (Chile)

United States	Paraguay

GK	1	Brad Guzan
RB	2	DeAndre Yedlin	(yellow card) 46' (yellow-red card) 47'
CB	20	Geoff Cameron
CB	6	John Brooks
LB	23	Fabian Johnson
CM	11	Alejandro Bedoya		(substituted off) 74'
CM	4	Michael Bradley (c)	(yellow card) 58'
CM	13	Jermaine Jones	(yellow card) 87'
RF	9	Gyasi Zardes
CF	8	Clint Dempsey		(substituted off) 49'
LF	7	Bobby Wood	(yellow card) 71'	(substituted off) 85'
Substitutions:
DF	14	Michael Orozco	(yellow card) 78'	(substituted on) 49'
MF	19	Graham Zusi		(substituted on) 74'
MF	15	Kyle Beckerman		(substituted on) 85'
Manager:
(Germany) Jürgen Klinsmann

GK	1	Justo Villar (c)
RB	14	Paulo da Silva
CB	3	Gustavo Gómez
CB	2	Fabián Balbuena		(substituted off) 46'
LB	6	Miguel Samudio
RM	10	Derlis González
CM	20	Víctor Ayala	(yellow card) 81'
CM	16	Celso Ortiz	(yellow card) 12'	(substituted off) 54'
LM	17	Miguel Almirón
CF	9	Antonio Sanabria		(substituted off) 62'
CF	19	Dario Lezcano
Substitutions:
FW	15	Juan Iturbe		(substituted on) 46'
MF	8	Juan Rodrigo Rojas	(yellow card) 70'	(substituted on) 54'
FW	7	Jorge Benítez		(substituted on) 62'
Manager:
(Argentina) Ramón Díaz

Man of the Match:
John Brooks (United States)

Assistant referees:
Carlos Astroza (Chile)
Christian Schiemann (Chile)
Fourth official:
John Pitti (Panama)
Fifth official:
Gabriel Victoria (Panama)

=== Colombia vs Costa Rica ===
The two teams had met in eleven previous occasions, the last being a friendly held at the Estadio Diego Armando Maradona in Buenos Aires in 2015, won by Colombia with a lone goal by Radamel Falcao. In Copa América, they have faced three times, with Colombia emerging victorious in every single occasion, including the last in 2011, with a goal scored by Adrián Ramos.

June 11, 2016
9:00 p.m.

Colombia	2–3	Costa Rica
Fabra 6'; M. Moreno 73'	Report (CONMEBOL); Report (CONCACAF)	Venegas 2'; Fabra 34' (o.g.); Borges 58'

NRG Stadium, Houston, Texas
Attendance: 45,808
Referee: José Argote (Venezuela)

Colombia	Costa Rica

GK	12	Róbinson Zapata
RB	15	Stefan Medina
CB	14	Felipe Aguilar		(substituted off) 66'
CB	3	Yerry Mina
LB	18	Frank Fabra
CM	5	Guillermo Celis
CM	6	Carlos Sánchez (c)
CM	13	Sebastián Pérez		(substituted off) 46'
RF	17	Dayro Moreno		(substituted off) 46'
CF	9	Roger Martínez	(yellow card) 41'
LF	21	Marlos Moreno
Substitutions:
MF	8	Edwin Cardona		(substituted on) 46'
MF	10	James Rodríguez		(substituted on) 46'
MF	11	Juan Cuadrado		(substituted on) 66'
Manager:
(Argentina) José Pékerman

GK	18	Patrick Pemberton	(yellow card) 83'
CB	19	Kendall Waston	(yellow card) 87'
CB	2	Jhonny Acosta
CB	3	Francisco Calvo
RWB	15	José Salvatierra		(substituted off) 46'
LWB	22	Rónald Matarrita
CM	14	Randall Azofeifa	(yellow card) 44'
CM	5	Celso Borges		(substituted off) 77'
RW	7	Christian Bolaños
LW	10	Bryan Ruiz (c)		(substituted off) 78'
CF	11	Johan Venegas
Substitutions:
DF	8	Bryan Oviedo		(substituted on) 46'
MF	17	Yeltsin Tejeda		(substituted on) 77'
FW	12	Joel Campbell	(yellow card) 90+2'	(substituted on) 78'
Manager:
Óscar Ramírez

Man of the Match:
Celso Borges (Costa Rica)

Assistant referees:
Luis Sánchez (Venezuela)
Luis Murillo (Venezuela)
Fourth official:
Daniel Fedorczuk (Uruguay)
Fifth official:
Christian Ramírez (Honduras)
