= Copa América Centenario knockout stage =

International football tournament stage

The knockout stage of the Copa América Centenario began on June 16 and concluded on June 26, 2016 with the final at MetLife Stadium in East Rutherford, New Jersey. All times are EDT (UTC−4).

== Qualified teams ==
The top two placed teams from each of the four groups qualified for the knockout stage.

| Group | Winners | Runners-up |
|---|---|---|
| A | United States | Colombia |
| B | Peru | Ecuador |
| C | Mexico | Venezuela |
| D | Argentina | Chile |

== Bracket ==
Quarter-finals
June 16 – Seattle, WA
United States | 2
Ecuador | 1
June 18 – Foxborough, MA
Argentina | 4
Venezuela | 1
June 17 – East Rutherford, NJ
Peru | 0 (2)
Colombia (p) | 0 (4)
June 18 – Santa Clara, CA
Mexico | 0
Chile | 7

Semi-finals
June 21 – Houston, TX
United States | 0
Argentina | 4
June 22 – Chicago, IL
Colombia | 0
Chile | 2

Final
June 26 – East Rutherford, NJ
Argentina | 0 (2)
Chile (p) | 0 (4)
Third place play-off
June 25 – Glendale, AZ
United States | 0
Colombia | 1

== Quarter-finals ==
=== United States vs Ecuador ===
June 16, 2016
9:30 p.m.

| United States | 2–1 | Ecuador |
|---|---|---|
| Dempsey 22'; Zardes 65' | Report (CONMEBOL); Report (CONCACAF) | Arroyo 74' |

CenturyLink Field, Seattle, Washington
Attendance: 47,322
Referee: Wilmar Roldán (Colombia)

| United States | Ecuador |

| GK | 1 | Brad Guzan | (yellow card) 84' |
| CB | 6 | John Brooks |
| CB | 20 | Geoff Cameron |
| CB | 5 | Matt Besler |
| DM | 13 | Jermaine Jones | (red card) 52' |
| CM | 4 | Michael Bradley (c) |
| CM | 11 | Alejandro Bedoya | (yellow card) 73' | (substituted off) 81' |
| RW | 8 | Clint Dempsey | | (substituted off) 75' |
| LW | 23 | Fabian Johnson |
| CF | 9 | Gyasi Zardes | | (substituted off) 90+4' |
| CF | 7 | Bobby Wood | (yellow card) 53' |
Substitutions:
| MF | 15 | Kyle Beckerman | | (substituted on) 75' |
| MF | 19 | Graham Zusi | | (substituted on) 81' |
| DF | 3 | Steve Birnbaum | | (substituted on) 90+4' |
Manager:
(Germany) Jürgen Klinsmann

| GK | 22 | Alexander Domínguez |
| RB | 4 | Juan Carlos Paredes | (yellow card) 64' | (substituted off) 82' |
| CB | 2 | Arturo Mina |
| CB | 3 | Frickson Erazo |
| LB | 10 | Walter Ayoví (c) |
| CM | 18 | Carlos Gruezo | | (substituted off) 72' |
| CM | 6 | Christian Noboa | | (substituted off) 62' |
| RW | 16 | Antonio Valencia | (yellow card) 37' (yellow-red card) 52' |
| AM | 11 | Michael Arroyo |
| LW | 7 | Jefferson Montero |
| CF | 13 | Enner Valencia |
Substitutions:
| MF | 8 | Fernando Gaibor | | (substituted on) 62' |
| DF | 5 | Cristian Ramírez | | (substituted on) 72' |
| FW | 17 | Jaime Ayoví | | (substituted on) 82' |
Manager:
| (Bolivia) Gustavo Quinteros | | | (red card) 90' |

Man of the Match:
Clint Dempsey (United States)

Assistant referees:
Alexander Guzmán (Colombia)
Wilmar Navarro (Colombia)
Fourth official:
Wilton Sampaio (Brazil)
Fifth official:
Juan Pablo Montaño (Bolivia)

=== Peru vs Colombia ===
June 17, 2016
8:00 p.m.

| Peru | 0–0 | Colombia |
|---|---|---|
| | Report (CONMEBOL); Report (CONCACAF) |
Penalties
| Ruidíaz (penalty scored); Tapia (penalty scored); Trauco (penalty missed); Cueva (penalty missed) | 2–4 | (penalty scored) Rodríguez; (penalty scored) Cuadrado; (penalty scored) D. Moreno; (penalty scored) Pérez |

MetLife Stadium, East Rutherford, New Jersey
Attendance: 79,194
Referee: Patricio Loustau (Argentina)

| Peru | Colombia |

| GK | 1 | Pedro Gallese |
| RB | 3 | Aldo Corzo |
| CB | 2 | Alberto Rodríguez |
| CB | 15 | Christian Ramos |
| LB | 6 | Miguel Trauco |
| CM | 16 | Óscar Vílchez |
| CM | 13 | Renato Tapia | (yellow card) 63' |
| RW | 8 | Andy Polo | | (substituted off) 81' |
| AM | 10 | Christian Cueva |
| LW | 20 | Edison Flores | | (substituted off) 77' |
| CF | 9 | Paolo Guerrero (c) |
Substitutions:
| FW | 11 | Raúl Ruidíaz | | (substituted on) 77' |
| MF | 18 | Cristian Benavente | | (substituted on) 81' |
Manager:
(Argentina) Ricardo Gareca

| GK | 1 | David Ospina |
| RB | 4 | Santiago Arias |
| CB | 2 | Cristián Zapata | (yellow card) 66' |
| CB | 22 | Jeison Murillo |
| LB | 19 | Farid Díaz | (yellow card) 70' | (substituted off) 90+1' |
| CM | 6 | Carlos Sánchez |
| CM | 16 | Dani Torres | | (substituted off) 80' |
| RW | 11 | Juan Cuadrado |
| AM | 10 | James Rodríguez (c) |
| LW | 8 | Edwin Cardona | | (substituted off) 76' |
| CF | 7 | Carlos Bacca |
Substitutions:
| FW | 17 | Dayro Moreno | | (substituted on) 76' |
| MF | 13 | Sebastián Pérez | | (substituted on) 80' |
| DF | 18 | Frank Fabra | | (substituted on) 90+1' |
Manager:
(Argentina) José Pékerman

Man of the Match:
David Ospina (Colombia)

Assistant referees:
Ezequiel Brailovsky (Argentina)
Ariel Scime (Argentina)
Fourth official:
Mark Geiger (United States)
Fifth official:
Charles Morgante (United States)

=== Argentina vs Venezuela ===
June 18, 2016
7:00 p.m.

| Argentina | 4–1 | Venezuela |
|---|---|---|
| Higuaín 8', 28'; Messi 60'; Lamela 71' | Report (CONMEBOL); Report (CONCACAF) | Rondón 70' |

Gillette Stadium, Foxborough, Massachusetts
Attendance: 59,183
Referee: Roberto García (Mexico)

| Argentina | Venezuela |

| GK | 1 | Sergio Romero |
| RB | 4 | Gabriel Mercado |
| CB | 17 | Nicolás Otamendi |
| CB | 13 | Ramiro Funes Mori |
| LB | 16 | Marcos Rojo |
| DM | 14 | Javier Mascherano |
| CM | 8 | Augusto Fernández |
| CM | 19 | Éver Banega | | (substituted off) 80' |
| RW | 10 | Lionel Messi (c) |
| LW | 20 | Nicolás Gaitán | (yellow card) 27' | (substituted off) 67' |
| CF | 9 | Gonzalo Higuaín | | (substituted off) 74' |
Substitutions:
| MF | 18 | Erik Lamela | | (substituted on) 67' |
| FW | 11 | Sergio Agüero | | (substituted on) 74' |
| MF | 6 | Lucas Biglia | | (substituted on) 80' |
Manager:
Gerardo Martino

| GK | 12 | Dani Hernández |
| RB | 21 | Alexander González |
| CB | 2 | Wilker Ángel | (yellow card) 52' |
| CB | 4 | Oswaldo Vizcarrondo |
| LB | 20 | Rolf Feltscher |
| RM | 15 | Alejandro Guerra |
| CM | 8 | Tomás Rincón (c) | | (substituted off) 85' |
| CM | 5 | Arquímedes Figuera | (yellow card) 63' |
| LM | 13 | Luis Manuel Seijas | (yellow card) 4' | (substituted off) 55' |
| CF | 9 | Salomón Rondón | (yellow card) 77' |
| CF | 17 | Josef Martínez | | (substituted off) 80' |
Substitutions:
| MF | 11 | Juanpi | | (substituted on) 55' |
| FW | 7 | Yonathan Del Valle | | (substituted on) 80' |
| DF | 6 | José Manuel Velázquez | | (substituted on) 85' |
Manager:
Rafael Dudamel

Man of the Match:
Lionel Messi (Argentina)

Assistant referees:
José Luis Camargo (Mexico)
Alberto Morín (Mexico)
Fourth official:
Ricardo Montero (Costa Rica)
Fifth official:
Christian Ramírez (Honduras)

=== Mexico vs Chile ===
June 18, 2016
10:00 p.m.

| Mexico | 0–7 | Chile |
|---|---|---|
| | Report (CONMEBOL); Report (CONCACAF) | Puch 15', 87'; Vargas 43', 51', 57', 73'; Sánchez 48' |

Levi's Stadium, Santa Clara, California
Attendance: 70,547
Referee: Héber Lopes (Brazil)

| Mexico | Chile |

| GK | 13 | Guillermo Ochoa |
| RB | 22 | Paul Aguilar |
| CB | 2 | Néstor Araujo |
| CB | 15 | Héctor Moreno |
| LB | 7 | Miguel Layún | (yellow card) 64' |
| DM | 20 | Jesús Dueñas | | (substituted off) 46' |
| CM | 16 | Héctor Herrera |
| CM | 18 | Andrés Guardado (c) | (yellow card) 59' |
| RW | 10 | Jesús Corona | | (substituted off) 61' |
| LW | 8 | Hirving Lozano | | (substituted off) 46' |
| CF | 14 | Javier Hernández |
Substitutions:
| FW | 9 | Raúl Jiménez | | (substituted on) 46' |
| MF | 21 | Carlos Peña | | (substituted on) 46' |
| DF | 5 | Diego Reyes | | (substituted on) 61' |
Manager:
(Colombia) Juan Carlos Osorio

| GK | 1 | Claudio Bravo (c) |
| RB | 21 | Marcelo Díaz | | (substituted off) 57' |
| CB | 18 | Gonzalo Jara |
| CB | 17 | Gary Medel | | (substituted off) 60' |
| LB | 15 | Jean Beausejour | | (substituted off) 73' |
| RM | 6 | José Pedro Fuenzalida |
| CM | 20 | Charles Aránguiz |
| CM | 8 | Arturo Vidal | (yellow card) 39' |
| LM | 22 | Edson Puch |
| SS | 7 | Alexis Sánchez |
| CF | 11 | Eduardo Vargas |
Substitutions:
| MF | 5 | Francisco Silva | | (substituted on) 57' |
| DF | 3 | Enzo Roco | | (substituted on) 60' |
| FW | 14 | Mark González | | (substituted on) 73' |
Manager:
(Spain) Juan Antonio Pizzi

Man of the Match:
Eduardo Vargas (Chile)

Assistant referees:
Kléber Lúcio Gil (Brazil)
Bruno Boschilia (Brazil)
Fourth official:
José Argote (Venezuela)
Fifth official:
Luis Sánchez (Venezuela)

== Semi-finals ==
=== United States vs Argentina ===
June 21, 2016
9:00 p.m.

| United States | 0–4 | Argentina |
|---|---|---|
| | Report (CONMEBOL); Report (CONCACAF) | Lavezzi 3'; Messi 32'; Higuaín 50', 86' |

NRG Stadium, Houston, Texas
Attendance: 70,858
Referee: Enrique Cáceres (Paraguay)

| United States | Argentina |

| GK | 1 | Brad Guzan |
| RB | 2 | DeAndre Yedlin |
| CB | 20 | Geoff Cameron |
| CB | 6 | John Brooks |
| LB | 23 | Fabian Johnson |
| DM | 15 | Kyle Beckerman | | (substituted off) 60' |
| RM | 19 | Graham Zusi |
| CM | 4 | Michael Bradley (c) |
| LM | 8 | Clint Dempsey | | (substituted off) 78' |
| CF | 9 | Gyasi Zardes |
| CF | 18 | Chris Wondolowski | (yellow card) 31' | (substituted off) 46' |
Substitutions:
| FW | 17 | Christian Pulisic | | (substituted on) 46' |
| DF | 3 | Steve Birnbaum | | (substituted on) 60' |
| MF | 10 | Darlington Nagbe | | (substituted on) 78' |
Manager:
(Germany) Jürgen Klinsmann

| GK | 1 | Sergio Romero |
| RB | 4 | Gabriel Mercado |
| CB | 17 | Nicolás Otamendi |
| CB | 13 | Ramiro Funes Mori |
| LB | 16 | Marcos Rojo | (substituted off) 84' |
| DM | 14 | Javier Mascherano |
| CM | 8 | Augusto Fernández | (substituted off) 59' |
| CM | 19 | Éver Banega |
| RW | 10 | Lionel Messi (c) |
| LW | 22 | Ezequiel Lavezzi | (substituted off) 67' |
| CF | 9 | Gonzalo Higuaín |
Substitutions:
| MF | 6 | Lucas Biglia | (substituted on) 59' |
| MF | 18 | Erik Lamela | (substituted on) 67' |
| DF | 15 | Víctor Cuesta | (substituted on) 84' |
Manager:
Gerardo Martino

Man of the Match:
Lionel Messi (Argentina)

Assistant referees:
Eduardo Cardozo (Paraguay)
Milciades Saldívar (Paraguay)
Fourth official:
Roddy Zambrano (Ecuador)
Fifth official:
Luis Vera (Ecuador)

=== Colombia vs Chile ===
Due to heavy thunderstorms in the Chicago area which arrived shortly after the first half ended, the start of the second half of the match was delayed by over two hours.

June 22, 2016
8:00 p.m.

| Colombia | 0–2 | Chile |
|---|---|---|
| | Report (CONMEBOL); Report (CONCACAF) | Aránguiz 6'; Fuenzalida 10' |

Soldier Field, Chicago, Illinois
Attendance: 55,423
Referee: Joel Aguilar (El Salvador)

| Colombia | Chile |

| GK | 1 | David Ospina |
| RB | 4 | Santiago Arias |
| CB | 2 | Cristián Zapata |
| CB | 22 | Jeison Murillo |
| LB | 18 | Frank Fabra | | (substituted off) 73' |
| CM | 6 | Carlos Sánchez | (yellow card) 41' (yellow-red card) 57' |
| CM | 16 | Dani Torres |
| RW | 11 | Juan Cuadrado | | (substituted off) 80' |
| AM | 10 | James Rodríguez (c) | (yellow card) 90' |
| LW | 8 | Edwin Cardona | | (substituted off) 46' |
| CF | 9 | Roger Martínez |
Substitutions:
| FW | 21 | Marlos Moreno | | (substituted on) 46' |
| MF | 13 | Sebastián Pérez | | (substituted on) 73' |
| FW | 7 | Carlos Bacca | (yellow card) 89' | (substituted on) 80' |
Manager:
(Argentina) José Pékerman

| GK | 1 | Claudio Bravo (c) | (yellow card) 39' |
| RB | 4 | Mauricio Isla |
| CB | 18 | Gonzalo Jara |
| CB | 17 | Gary Medel |
| LB | 15 | Jean Beausejour | (yellow card) 65' |
| DM | 5 | Francisco Silva | (yellow card) 85' |
| CM | 20 | Charles Aránguiz |
| CM | 10 | Pablo Hernández | | (substituted off) 30' |
| RW | 6 | José Pedro Fuenzalida | | (substituted off) 75' |
| LW | 7 | Alexis Sánchez | (yellow card) 45+3' |
| CF | 11 | Eduardo Vargas | | (substituted off) 88' |
Substitutions:
| MF | 13 | Erick Pulgar | | (substituted on) 30' |
| FW | 22 | Edson Puch | (yellow card) 78' | (substituted on) 75' |
| FW | 14 | Mark González | | (substituted on) 88' |
Manager:
(Spain) Juan Antonio Pizzi

Man of the Match:
Charles Aránguiz (Chile)

Assistant referees:
Juan Zumba (El Salvador)
William Torres (El Salvador)
Fourth official:
José Argote (Venezuela)
Fifth official:
Luis Murillo (Venezuela)

== Third place play-off ==
June 25, 2016
8:00 p.m.

| United States | 0–1 | Colombia |
|---|---|---|
| | Report (CONMEBOL); Report (CONCACAF) | Bacca 31' |

University of Phoenix Stadium, Glendale, Arizona
Attendance: 29,041
Referee: Daniel Fedorczuk (Uruguay)

| United States | Colombia |

| GK | 12 | Tim Howard |
| CB | 14 | Michael Orozco | (yellow card) 88' (red card) 90+3' |
| CB | 20 | Geoff Cameron |
| CB | 5 | Matt Besler | (yellow card) 22' |
| DM | 13 | Jermaine Jones | (yellow card) 41' |
| RM | 2 | DeAndre Yedlin |
| CM | 4 | Michael Bradley (c) | | (substituted off) 79' |
| CM | 11 | Alejandro Bedoya | | (substituted off) 74' |
| LM | 8 | Clint Dempsey |
| CF | 9 | Gyasi Zardes |
| CF | 7 | Bobby Wood |
Substitutions:
| FW | 17 | Christian Pulisic | | (substituted on) 74' |
| MF | 10 | Darlington Nagbe | | (substituted on) 79' |
Manager:
(Germany) Jürgen Klinsmann

| GK | 1 | David Ospina |
| RB | 4 | Santiago Arias | (yellow card) 90+3' (yellow-red card) 90+4' |
| CB | 2 | Cristián Zapata |
| CB | 22 | Jeison Murillo | (yellow card) 13' |
| LB | 18 | Frank Fabra |
| CM | 5 | Guillermo Celis | | (substituted off) 87' |
| CM | 16 | Dani Torres |
| RW | 11 | Juan Cuadrado | (yellow card) 73' | (substituted off) 74' |
| AM | 10 | James Rodríguez (c) |
| LW | 8 | Edwin Cardona |
| CF | 7 | Carlos Bacca | | (substituted off) 79' |
Substitutions:
| FW | 21 | Marlos Moreno | | (substituted on) 74' |
| FW | 9 | Roger Martínez | | (substituted on) 79' |
| DF | 15 | Stefan Medina | | (substituted on) 87' |
Manager:
(Argentina) José Pékerman

Man of the Match:
David Ospina (Colombia)

Assistant referees:
Richard Trinidad (Uruguay)
Luis Sánchez (Venezuela)
Fourth official:
Yadel Martínez (Cuba)
Fifth official:
Gabriel Victoria (Panama)

== Final ==
June 26, 2016
8:00 p.m.

| Argentina | 0–0 (a.e.t.) | Chile |
|---|---|---|
| | Report (CONMEBOL); Report (CONCACAF) |
Penalties
| Messi (penalty missed); Mascherano (penalty scored); Agüero (penalty scored); Biglia (penalty missed) | 2–4 | (penalty missed) Vidal; (penalty scored) Castillo; (penalty scored) Aránguiz; (penalty scored) Beausejour; (penalty scored) Silva |

MetLife Stadium, East Rutherford, New Jersey
Attendance: 82,026
Referee: Héber Lopes (Brazil)

| Argentina | Chile |

| GK | 1 | Sergio Romero |
| RB | 4 | Gabriel Mercado |
| CB | 17 | Nicolás Otamendi |
| CB | 13 | Ramiro Funes Mori |
| LB | 16 | Marcos Rojo | (red card) 43' |
| DM | 6 | Lucas Biglia |
| DM | 14 | Javier Mascherano | (yellow card) 37' |
| CM | 19 | Éver Banega | | (substituted off) 111' |
| RW | 10 | Lionel Messi (c) | (yellow card) 40' |
| LW | 7 | Ángel Di María | | (substituted off) 57' |
| CF | 9 | Gonzalo Higuaín | | (substituted off) 70' |
Substitutions:
| MF | 5 | Matías Kranevitter | (yellow card) 94' | (substituted on) 57' |
| MF | 18 | Erik Lamela | | (substituted on) 111' |
| FW | 11 | Sergio Agüero | | (substituted on) 70' |
Manager:
Gerardo Martino

| GK | 1 | Claudio Bravo (c) |
| RB | 4 | Mauricio Isla |
| CB | 18 | Gonzalo Jara |
| CB | 17 | Gary Medel |
| LB | 15 | Jean Beausejour | (yellow card) 52' |
| DM | 21 | Marcelo Díaz | (yellow card) 16' (yellow-red card) 28' |
| CM | 8 | Arturo Vidal | (yellow card) 37' |
| CM | 20 | Charles Aránguiz | (yellow card) 69' |
| RW | 6 | José Pedro Fuenzalida | | (substituted off) 80' |
| LW | 7 | Alexis Sánchez | | (substituted off) 104' |
| CF | 11 | Eduardo Vargas | | (substituted off) 109' |
Substitutions:
| MF | 5 | Francisco Silva | | (substituted on) 104' |
| FW | 16 | Nicolás Castillo | | (substituted on) 109' |
| FW | 22 | Edson Puch | | (substituted on) 80' |
Manager:
(Argentina) Juan Antonio Pizzi

Man of the Match:
Claudio Bravo (Chile)

Assistant referees:
Kléber Lúcio Gil (Brazil)
Bruno Boschilia (Brazil)
Fourth official:
Roberto García (Mexico)
Fifth official:
José Luis Camargo (Mexico)
