= Copa América Centenario Group B =

2016 football tournament results

Group B of the Copa América Centenario consisted of Brazil, Ecuador, Haiti, and Peru. Matches began on June 4 and ended on June 12, 2016. All times are EDT (UTC−4).

Peru and Ecuador advanced to the quarter-finals.

== Teams ==
Draw position	Team	Confederation	Method of qualification	Finals appearance	Last appearance	Previous best performance	FIFA Rankings	
Draw position	Team	Confederation	Method of qualification	Finals appearance	Last appearance	Previous best performance	December 2015 (Note: The rankings of December 2015 were used for seeding for the final draw, except for certain cases.)	June 2016
B1 (seed)	Brazil	CONMEBOL	Automatic qualifier	35th	2015	Winners (Eight times)	6	7
B2	Ecuador	CONMEBOL	Automatic qualifier	27th	2015	Fourth Place (1959 and 1993)	13	13
B3	Haiti	CONCACAF	Qualifying play-offs winners	1st	—	—	77	74
B4	Peru	CONMEBOL	Automatic qualifier	31st	2015	Winners (1939 and 1975)	47	48

== Standings ==
Pos	Team	Pld	W	D	L	GF	GA	GD	Pts	Qualification
1	Peru	3	2	1	0	4	2	+2	7	Advance to knockout stage
2	Ecuador	3	1	2	0	6	2	+4	5	Advance to knockout stage
3	Brazil	3	1	1	1	7	2	+5	4	
4	Haiti	3	0	0	3	1	12	−11	0	

Source: CONMEBOL & CONCACAF
Rules for classification: Group stage tiebreakers

In the quarter-finals:

- The winner of Group B, Peru, advanced to play the runner-up of Group A, Colombia.
- The runner-up of Group B, Ecuador, advanced to play the winner of Group A, United States.

== Matches ==
=== Haiti vs Peru ===
The two teams had met in four previous encounters, the last being a friendly in 2003 won by Peru 3–0. Both teams faced each other in an official tournament for the second time in history, after a 1–1 draw in a 2000 CONCACAF Gold Cup group stage match. This match marked Haiti's debut in Copa América, making them the second Caribbean team to appear at the tournament, after Jamaica in 2015.

June 4, 2016
7:30 p.m.

Haiti	0–1	Peru
	Report (CONMEBOL); Report (CONCACAF)	Guerrero 61'

CenturyLink Field, Seattle, Washington
Attendance: 20,190
Referee: John Pitti (Panama)

Haiti	Peru

GK	1	Johny Placide (c)
RB	8	Réginal Goreux
CB	5	Romain Genevois
CB	3	Mechack Jérôme
LB	4	Kim Jaggy
CM	10	Jeff Louis
CM	14	James Marcelin	(yellow card) 75'
CM	13	Kevin Lafrance
RW	19	Max Hilaire		(substituted off) 39'
CF	20	Duckens Nazon		(substituted off) 70'
LW	7	Wilde-Donald Guerrier
Substitutions:
MF	16	Jean Alexandre	(yellow card) 50'	(substituted on) 39'
FW	9	Kervens Belfort		(substituted on) 70'
Manager:
(France) Patrice Neveu

GK	1	Pedro Gallese
RB	4	Renzo Revoredo
CB	2	Alberto Rodríguez	(yellow card) 29'
CB	15	Christian Ramos
LB	6	Miguel Trauco
CM	13	Renato Tapia
CM	16	Óscar Vílchez
RW	21	Alejandro Hohberg		(substituted off) 83'
AM	10	Christian Cueva		(substituted off) 75'
LW	20	Edison Flores		(substituted off) 90+1'
CF	9	Paolo Guerrero (c)	(yellow card) 69'
Substitutions:
MF	19	Yoshimar Yotún	(yellow card) 84'	(substituted on) 75'
MF	8	Andy Polo		(substituted on) 83'
MF	7	Luiz da Silva		(substituted on) 90+1'
Manager:
(Argentina) Ricardo Gareca

Man of the Match:
Paolo Guerrero (Peru)

Assistant referees:
Gabriel Victoria (Panama)
Christian Ramírez (Honduras)
Fourth official:
Armando Villarreal (United States)
Fifth official:
Hiran Dopico (Cuba)

=== Brazil vs Ecuador ===
The two teams had met in twenty-nine previous encounters, the last being a friendly held at the MetLife Stadium in East Rutherford, New Jersey in 2014, won by Brazil with a lone goal by Willian. Their last Copa América encounter was a 2011 group stage match, won by Brazil 4–2, with braces scored by Alexandre Pato, Neymar, and Felipe Caicedo.

June 4, 2016
10:00 p.m.

Brazil	0–0	Ecuador
	Report (CONMEBOL); Report (CONCACAF)

Rose Bowl, Pasadena, California
Attendance: 53,158
Referee: Julio Bascuñán (Chile)

Brazil	Ecuador

GK	1	Alisson
RB	2	Dani Alves (c)
CB	13	Marquinhos
CB	4	Gil	(yellow card) 39'
LB	6	Filipe Luís
DM	5	Casemiro	(yellow card) 18'
CM	8	Elias	(yellow card) 36'	(substituted off) 86'
CM	18	Renato Augusto
RW	19	Willian		(substituted off) 76'
LW	22	Philippe Coutinho
CF	9	Jonas		(substituted off) 62'
Substitutions:
FW	11	Gabriel Barbosa		(substituted on) 62'
MF	20	Lucas Moura		(substituted on) 76'
MF	10	Lucas Lima		(substituted on) 86'
Manager:
Dunga

GK	12	Esteban Dreer
RB	4	Juan Carlos Paredes	(yellow card) 47'
CB	21	Gabriel Achilier
CB	2	Arturo Mina
LB	10	Walter Ayoví (c)
CM	18	Carlos Gruezo
CM	6	Christian Noboa
RM	16	Antonio Valencia
AM	23	Miller Bolaños		(substituted off) 90+1'
LM	7	Jefferson Montero		(substituted off) 81'
CF	13	Enner Valencia	(yellow card) 77'	(substituted off) 81'
Substitutions:
MF	9	Fidel Martínez		(substituted on) 81'
FW	17	Jaime Ayoví	(yellow card) 86'	(substituted on) 81'
MF	8	Fernando Gaibor		(substituted on) 90+1'
Manager:
(Bolivia) Gustavo Quinteros

Man of the Match:
Esteban Dreer (Ecuador)

Assistant referees:
Carlos Astroza (Chile)
Christian Schiemann (Chile)
Fourth official:
José Argote (Venezuela)
Fifth official:
John Alexander León (Colombia)

=== Brazil vs Haiti ===
The two teams had met in only two previous occasions, both friendlies, the last held at the Stade Sylvio Cator in Port-au-Prince in 2004, which Brazil won 6–0.

June 8, 2016
7:30 p.m.

Brazil	7–1	Haiti
Coutinho 14', 29', 90+2'; Renato Augusto 35', 86'; Gabriel Barbosa 59'; Lucas Lima 67'	Report (CONMEBOL); Report (CONCACAF)	Marcelin 70'

Camping World Stadium, Orlando, Florida
Attendance: 28,241
Referee: Mark Geiger (United States)

Brazil	Haiti

GK	1	Alisson
RB	2	Dani Alves (c)
CB	13	Marquinhos
CB	4	Gil
LB	6	Filipe Luís
DM	5	Casemiro	(yellow card) 38'	(substituted off) 62'
CM	8	Elias		(substituted off) 71'
CM	18	Renato Augusto
RW	19	Willian
LW	22	Philippe Coutinho
CF	9	Jonas		(substituted off) 46'
Substitutions:
FW	11	Gabriel Barbosa		(substituted on) 46'
MF	10	Lucas Lima		(substituted on) 62'
MF	17	Walace		(substituted on) 71'
Manager:
Dunga

GK	1	Johny Placide (c)
RB	3	Mechack Jérôme
CB	5	Romain Genevois
CB	13	Kevin Lafrance
LB	4	Kim Jaggy
CM	14	James Marcelin
CM	16	Jean Alexandre		(substituted off) 62'
RW	2	Jean Sony Alcénat		(substituted off) 82'
AM	10	Jeff Louis
LW	8	Réginal Goreux	(yellow card) 25'
CF	9	Kervens Belfort		(substituted off) 51'
Substitutions:
FW	20	Duckens Nazon		(substituted on) 51'
MF	19	Max Hilaire		(substituted on) 62'
FW	21	Jean-Eudes Maurice		(substituted on) 82'
Manager:
(France) Patrice Neveu

Man of the Match:
Philippe Coutinho (Brazil)

Assistant referees:
Joe Fletcher (Canada)
Charles Morgante (United States)
Fourth official:
Roberto García (Mexico)
Fifth official:
José Luis Camargo (Mexico)

=== Ecuador vs Peru ===
The two teams had met in forty-seven previous occasions, the last being a 2014 FIFA World Cup qualifying match held in Lima in 2013, which Peru won with a lone goal by Claudio Pizarro. In Copa América, their last meeting was in a 1995 group stage match, won by Ecuador 2–1.

June 8, 2016
10:00 p.m.

Ecuador	2–2	Peru
E. Valencia 39'; Bolaños 49'	Report (CONMEBOL); Report (CONCACAF)	Cueva 5'; Flores 13'

University of Phoenix Stadium, Glendale, Arizona
Attendance: 11,937
Referee: Wilmar Roldán (Colombia)

Ecuador	Peru

GK	22	Alexander Domínguez
RB	4	Juan Carlos Paredes		(substituted off) 46'
CB	21	Gabriel Achilier	(yellow card) 22' (yellow-red card) 90+3'
CB	2	Arturo Mina
LB	10	Walter Ayoví (c)
CM	18	Carlos Gruezo	(yellow card) 12'
CM	6	Christian Noboa
RW	16	Antonio Valencia
AM	23	Miller Bolaños		(substituted off) 62'
LW	7	Jefferson Montero		(substituted off) 88'
CF	13	Enner Valencia
Substitutions:
FW	17	Jaime Ayoví		(substituted on) 46'
MF	9	Fidel Martínez		(substituted on) 62'
FW	19	Juan Cazares		(substituted on) 88'
Manager:
(Bolivia) Gustavo Quinteros

GK	1	Pedro Gallese
RB	4	Renzo Revoredo
CB	15	Christian Ramos
CB	2	Alberto Rodríguez
LB	6	Miguel Trauco
CM	13	Renato Tapia
CM	16	Óscar Vílchez	(yellow card) 52'	(substituted off) 72'
RW	21	Alejandro Hohberg		(substituted off) 50'
AM	10	Christian Cueva
LW	20	Edison Flores		(substituted off) 79'
CF	9	Paolo Guerrero (c)
Substitutions:
MF	8	Andy Polo		(substituted on) 50'
FW	11	Raúl Ruidíaz		(substituted on) 72'
MF	19	Yoshimar Yotún		(substituted on) 79'
Manager:
(Argentina) Ricardo Gareca

Man of the Match:
Enner Valencia (Ecuador)

Assistant referees:
Alexander Guzmán (Colombia)
Wilmar Navarro (Colombia)
Fourth official:
Yadel Martínez (Cuba)
Fifth official:
Hiran Dopico (Cuba)

=== Ecuador vs Haiti ===
The two teams had met in four previous encounters, the last being a friendly in 2008, which Ecuador won 3–1. This was the second match between both teams in an official tournament, as they already faced each other in a 2002 CONCACAF Gold Cup group stage match, won by Haiti 2–0.

June 12, 2016
6:30 p.m.

Ecuador	4–0	Haiti
E. Valencia 11'; J. Ayoví 20'; Noboa 57'; A. Valencia 78'	Report (CONMEBOL); Report (CONCACAF)

MetLife Stadium, East Rutherford, New Jersey
Attendance: 50,976
Referee: Gery Vargas (Bolivia)

Ecuador	Haiti

GK	22	Alexander Domínguez
RB	4	Juan Carlos Paredes
CB	2	Arturo Mina
CB	3	Frickson Erazo
LB	10	Walter Ayoví (c)
CM	16	Antonio Valencia
CM	6	Christian Noboa
CM	18	Carlos Gruezo	(substituted off) 79'
RW	17	Jaime Ayoví	(substituted off) 46'
CF	13	Enner Valencia	(substituted off) 84'
LW	7	Jefferson Montero
Substitutions:
FW	19	Juan Cazares	(substituted on) 46'
MF	8	Fernando Gaibor	(substituted on) 79'
MF	9	Fidel Martínez	(substituted on) 84'
Manager:
(Bolivia) Gustavo Quinteros

GK	1	Johny Placide (c)
RB	6	Stéphane Lambese
CB	5	Romain Genevois	(yellow card) 90+2'
CB	3	Mechack Jérôme
LB	4	Kim Jaggy
RM	21	Jean-Eudes Maurice
CM	13	Kevin Lafrance	(yellow card) 37'	(substituted off) 71'
CM	14	James Marcelin		(substituted off) 79'
LM	15	Sony Norde
CF	20	Duckens Nazon
CF	9	Kervens Belfort		(substituted off) 70'
Substitutions:
FW	10	Jeff Louis		(substituted on) 70'
MF	19	Max Hilaire		(substituted on) 71'
MF	16	Jean Alexandre		(substituted on) 79'
Manager:
(France) Patrice Neveu

Man of the Match:
Enner Valencia (Ecuador)

Assistant referees:
Javier Bustillos (Bolivia)
Juan Pablo Montaño (Bolivia)
Fourth official:
Patricio Loustau (Argentina)
Fifth official:
Ezequiel Brailovsky (Argentina)

=== Brazil vs Peru ===
The two teams had met in forty-one previous encounters, the last being a 2018 FIFA World Cup qualifying match held at the Itaipava Arena Fonte Nova in Salvador in 2015, which Brazil won 3–0. Earlier that year, they had their latest Copa América encounter, a group stage match, also won by Brazil 2–1.

June 12, 2016
8:30 p.m.

Brazil	0–1	Peru
	Report (CONMEBOL); Report (CONCACAF)	Ruidíaz 75'

Gillette Stadium, Foxborough, Massachusetts
Attendance: 36,187
Referee: Andrés Cunha (Uruguay)

Brazil	Peru

GK	1	Alisson
RB	2	Dani Alves
CB	3	Miranda (c)
CB	4	Gil
LB	6	Filipe Luís
CM	8	Elias
CM	18	Renato Augusto	(yellow card) 89'
RW	19	Willian
AM	10	Lucas Lima	(yellow card) 72'
LW	22	Philippe Coutinho
CF	11	Gabriel Barbosa		(substituted off) 72'
Substitutions:
FW	21	Hulk		(substituted on) 72'
Manager:
Dunga

GK	1	Pedro Gallese
RB	3	Aldo Corzo
CB	2	Alberto Rodríguez
CB	15	Christian Ramos
LB	6	Miguel Trauco
CM	16	Óscar Vílchez
CM	5	Adán Balbín		(substituted off) 46'
RW	8	Andy Polo
AM	10	Christian Cueva		(substituted off) 90+1'
LW	20	Edison Flores		(substituted off) 64'
CF	9	Paolo Guerrero (c)
Substitutions:
MF	19	Yoshimar Yotún	(yellow card) 90+3'	(substituted on) 46'
FW	11	Raúl Ruidíaz		(substituted on) 64'
MF	13	Renato Tapia		(substituted on) 90+1'
Manager:
(Argentina) Ricardo Gareca

Man of the Match:
Pedro Gallese (Peru)

Assistant referees:
Nicolás Taran (Uruguay)
Richard Trinidad (Uruguay)
Fourth official:
Enrique Cáceres (Paraguay)
Fifth official:
Eduardo Cardozo (Paraguay)
