= Carlos Bacca =

Colombian footballer (born 1986)

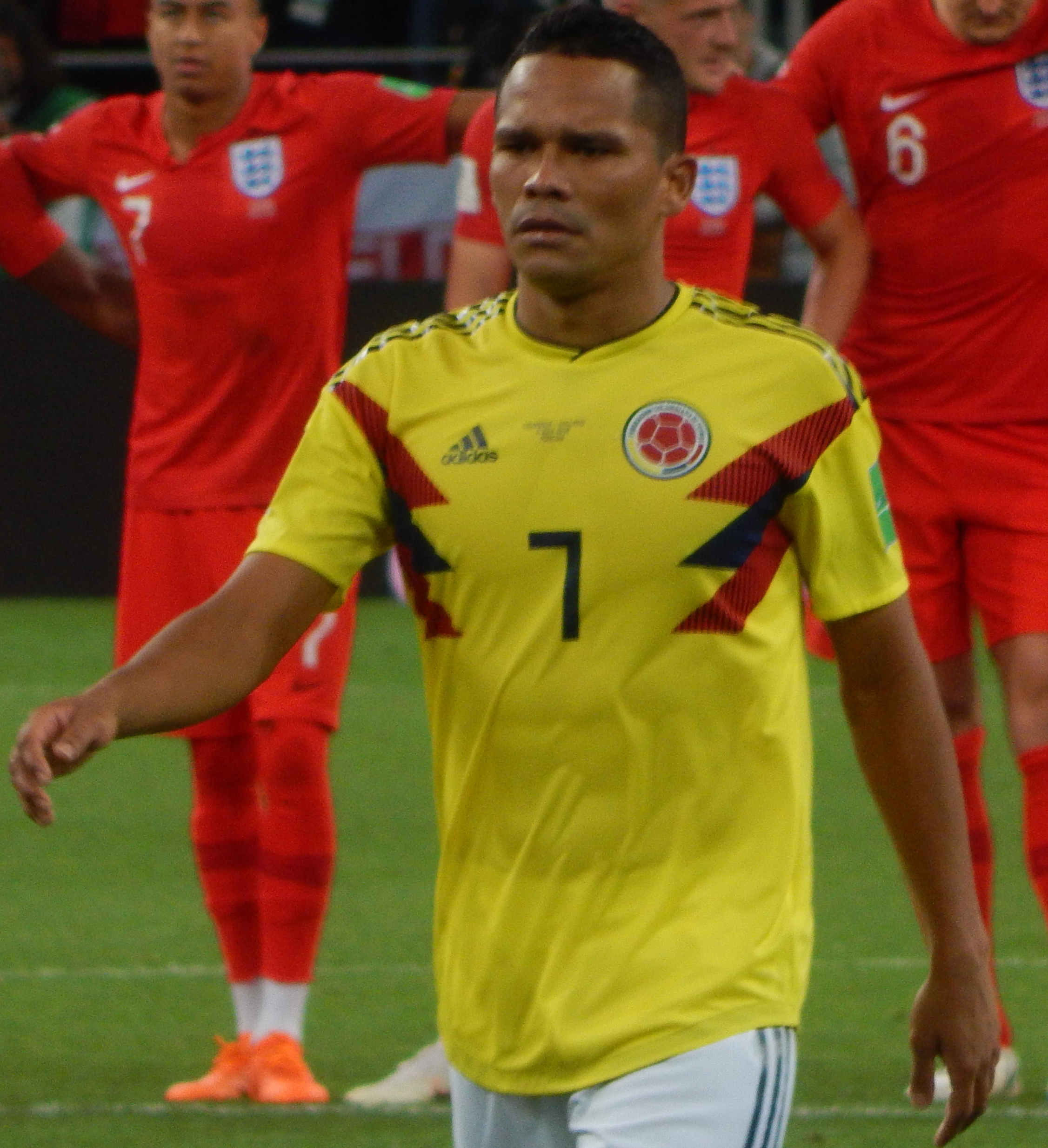
- Bacca with Colombia at the 2018 FIFA World Cup

Personal information
- Full name: Carlos Arturo Bacca Ahumada
- Date of birth: 8 September 1986 (age 40)
- Place of birth: Puerto Colombia, Colombia
- Height: 1.81 m (5 ft 11 in)
- Position: Striker

Team information
- Current team: Deportivo Cali
- Number: 70

Senior career*
Years	Team	Apps	(Gls)
2007–2011	Atlético Junior	97	(50)
2007	→ Barranquilla (loan)	27	(12)
2007–2008	→ Minervén (loan)	29	(12)
2008	→ Barranquilla (loan)	19	(14)
2011–2013	Club Brugge	45	(28)
2013–2015	Sevilla	72	(34)
2015–2018	AC Milan	70	(31)
2017–2018	→ Villarreal (loan)	35	(15)
2018–2021	Villarreal	75	(13)
2021–2022	Granada	19	(1)
2022–2026	Atlético Junior	136	(53)
2026–	Deportivo Cali	0	(0)

International career
2010–2018	Colombia	52	(16)
Medal record
Representing Colombia
Bronze medal – third place	Copa América Centenario	2016
- * Club domestic league appearances and goals as of 05:04, 24 January 2026 (UTC)

Carlos Arturo Bacca Ahumada (born 8 September 1986) is a Colombian professional footballer who plays as a striker for Categoría Primera A club Deportivo Cali.

Bacca began his career at Atlético Junior, where he was top scorer in the 2010 Categoría Primera A Apertura. In January 2012, he moved to Club Brugge, where he was the Belgian Pro League's top scorer in his only full season before joining Sevilla for €7 million. He won the UEFA Europa League in both of his first two seasons with the club, scoring twice in the 2015 final. In the summer of 2015, he joined Serie A side AC Milan for €30 million.

An international for Colombia from 2012 to 2018, Bacca represented the country at the 2014 and 2018 FIFA World Cups, the 2015 Copa América, and the Copa América Centenario, in which they finished third. He is renowned for his pace, aggression, eye for goal, and determination as a forward.

== Background and personal life ==
Bacca was born in Puerto Colombia, a coastal town within the Barranquilla metropolitan area, to Gilberto Bacca and Eloisa Ahumada. Bacca is known to be an extremely religious person of the Evangelical Christian faith, frequently thanking God in interviews, and despite his denomination it was at one time rumored that he wanted to join Italian club Roma so that he would be close to the Pope.

== Club career ==
=== Atlético Junior ===
Bacca began his professional career with Atlético Junior in 2006, where he did not have many chances to play. While playing football, Bacca had a second job working as a bus driver's assistant, to earn more money since his family came from a poor background. On loan at Barranquilla FC in 2007, Bacca made 27 appearances and scored 12 goals. After that, he joined Venezuelan club Minervén on loan for a season. Bacca led the club into second place in the league, scoring 12 goals in 29 games. In 2008, Bacca rejoined Barranquilla on loan once again and was the league top scorer with 14 goals in 19 games.

Bacca made his professional debut on 1 March 2009 in a 2009 Apertura match against Deportivo Pasto; with the score at 0-0, Bacca entered the game as a sub and scored two goals in 15 minutes to give his club a 2–0 victory. In his first professional season at Junior, Bacca quickly earned himself a regular first team place and was the top scorer in the 2009 Copa Colombia. One year later, in 2010, he became the winner and top goalscorer of the Categoría Primera A, repeating in 2011 as winner and top goalscorer giving Junior their sixth and seventh Colombian titles.

Since making a breakthrough at Atlético Junior, Bacca had attracted clubs' interest, mostly from Europe. Many clubs in Europe like Russian side Lokomotiv Moscow and Chievo came close to Bacca's signature, but those moves were never completed. Bacca revealed that he nearly joined Lokomotiv, but his hopes of moving to Russia ended after the club instead signed Ecuadorian striker Felipe Caicedo.

=== Club Brugge ===
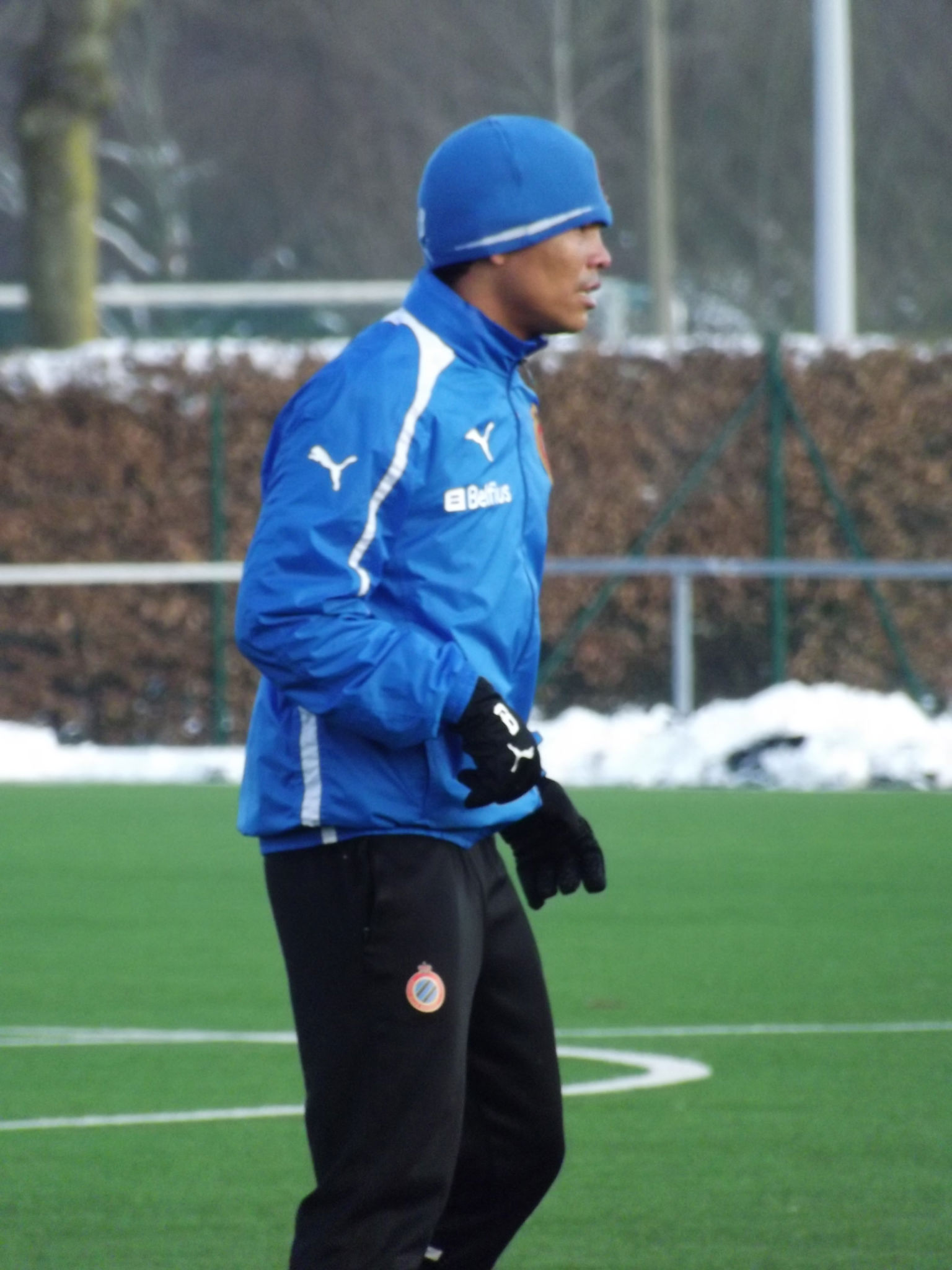
Bacca training with Club Brugge in 2013

During the beginning of 2012, Bacca signed for Belgian side Club Brugge, putting pen to paper on a three-year contract worth €1.5 million for his services.

He made his debut on 21 January 2012, coming on as a substitute for Lior Refaelov in the 68th minute, as Brugge lost 1–0 against Mechelen. In his first three months at Brugge, Bacca struggled to make a breakthrough in the first team, but in the playoffs, he earned his place in the first team. On 15 April 2012, Bacca scored his first league goal for the club against Gent, which gave Brugge the 1–0 win. Then in the last game of the season, Bacca scored twice, in a 3–2 win over Kortrijk, as Brugge finished in second place to earn a European spot.

At the start of the 2012–13 season, Bacca started to play more regularly after the departure of Joseph Akpala and earned the trust of new manager Georges Leekens. In January 2013, having scored 18 goals to date, Bacca asked for a transfer after announcing his intention to leave Brugge. This in response to several clubs throughout Europe expressing an interest in Bacca. However, in an unexpected turn of events two weeks later, Bacca signed a new contract that would have kept him at the club until 2016. At the end of the 2012–13 season, Bacca finished as the league's top scorer. This led to him being nominated for the Player of the Year in Belgium. Six days later, Bacca won the award in Belgium and wrote on Twitter saying, "Thanks to my family, friends, family and Club Brugge especially throughout Colombia, this award is for you, thanks for your support."

In his Brugge career, he scored 28 goals in 45 league appearances.

=== Sevilla ===
On 9 July 2013, Spanish club Sevilla signed Bacca for €7 million on a five-year contract with a €30 million buy-out release clause.

In the Copa EuroAmericana, Bacca scored his first Sevilla goal in a 3–1 win over Barcelona SC on 26 July. He scored his first competitive goal for the club on 1 August in a 3–0 home win over Mladost Podgorica for the third qualifying round of the 2013–14 Europa League. His La Liga debut came on 18 August in a 1–3 home loss to Atlético Madrid. On 25 September, he scored his first two league goals against Rayo Vallecano in a 4–1 victory.

On 26 March 2014, Bacca netted two goals in a 2–1 Sevilla victory against the then league leaders Real Madrid at the Ramón Sánchez Pizjuán Stadium. In the second leg of Sevilla's Europa League quarter-final tie with Porto on 10 April, he scored his side's third goal in a 4–1 win, securing a 4–2 aggregate victory and a spot in the semi-finals of the competition. Two weeks later, he scored the second goal in their 2–0 semi-final first leg win over compatriots Valencia. In the final on 14 May, he scored in the penalty shootout where Sevilla beat Benfica to lift the trophy. Bacca was voted by Marca as the best signing of the 2013–14 La Liga season. At LaLiga Awards, he was voted the season's best player from the Americas, ahead of Real Madrid's Ángel Di María and Barcelona's Neymar.

On 30 September 2014, Bacca signed a contract extension with Sevilla, keeping him at the club until 2018. He scored seven European goals as the club retained their Europa League crown, including two in the final for a 3–2 victory over Dnipro Dnipropetrovsk, thus qualifying the team to the next season's Champions League.

=== AC Milan ===
On 2 July 2015, Serie A club AC Milan announced the signing of Bacca after activating his buyout clause of reported €30 million, subject to a medical. He made his debut for Milan in a friendly win over city rivals Internazionale in Shenzhen, China. He made his competitive debut on 17 August in the third round of the Coppa Italia, starting in a 2–0 win over Perugia at the San Siro. He scored his first goal in Serie A on 29 August 2015 in a 2–1 home win against Empoli. He scored his first brace in Serie A on 19 September in a 3–2 home win against Palermo. On 13 January 2016, he scored a rabona-style goal against Carpi in a 2–1 Coppa Italia win, taking Milan to the semi-finals of the tournament, then scored again in the weekend as Milan beat Fiorentina 2–0. On 31 January, he scored in the Derby della Madonnina against Inter, helping Milan triumph 3–0, then again three days later in a 2–0 victory at Palermo. On 21 August 2016 he scored his first hat-trick against Torino in a 3–2 win at San Siro.

=== Villarreal ===
On 16 August 2017, Villarreal confirmed the signing of Bacca on a one-year loan deal for a fee of €2.5 million, with the option to purchase the player for an additional €15.5 million. Four days later he made his debut in the first game of the new season, starting in a 1–0 loss at Levante alongside fellow debutant Enes Ünal. He scored his first goal for the Yellow Submarine on 10 September, capitalising on an error by Real Betis goalkeeper Antonio Adán to open a 3–1 win at the Estadio de la Cerámica.

On 17 August 2018, Bacca was sold to Villarreal as part of a transaction for Samu Castillejo. He played there for three more seasons, culminating in his winning the 2020-21 UEFA Europa League against Manchester United in the final.

=== Granada ===
On 13 July 2021, Spanish club Granada signed Bacca as a free agent, becoming their first signing for the new season. He made 19 appearances for the side, scoring once in a Copa del Rey 7–0 win over Laguna on 30 November 2021.

=== Return to Atlético Junior ===
On 12 July 2022, Bacca returned to Atlético Junior on a two-year deal.

== International career ==
Bacca scored his first goal for the senior national team in his debut on 11 August 2010, putting Colombia in front against Bolivia at the Estadio Hernando Siles in La Paz; the match finished in a 1–1 draw. His next goal for Colombia came over two years later, scoring his side's second of the match in a 3–0 win over Cameroon on 17 October 2012.

On 31 May 2014, Bacca scored to put Colombia ahead 2–0 against Senegal, in a match that finished 2–2. Bacca was selected to the final 23-man roster for Colombia at the 2014 FIFA World Cup in Brazil less than a week later. Bacca made one appearance in the finals, coming on as a substitute and winning a penalty in Colombia's 1–2 defeat to hosts Brazil in the quarter-finals.

In a friendly match against El Salvador at the Red Bull Arena in Harrison, New Jersey on 10 October 2014, Bacca scored twice as Colombia won 3–0.

In May 2015, Bacca was included in Colombia's 23-man squad for the 2015 Copa América by coach José Pékerman. After the team's second match, a 1–0 win against Brazil in Santiago on 17 June, Bacca was red carded after the final whistle for pushing over Brazilian striker Neymar, who himself was earlier sent off for deliberately kicking the ball at Pablo Armero. Bacca was given a two-match ban, while Neymar was suspended for four matches.

On 25 June 2016, Bacca scored Colombia's match-winning goal against hosts the United States in a 1–0 win in the third-place match of the Copa América Centenario.

In May 2018, he was named in Colombia's 23-man squad for the 2018 FIFA World Cup in Russia. At the finals, he had his penalty saved by Jordan Pickford in the penalty shootout as Colombia went out at the Round of 16 stage to England.

== Style of play ==
During his time under manager Unai Emery at Sevilla, Bacca modified his playing style, improving his mentality, work-rate, and the defensive aspect of his game; he was also often deployed in deeper areas of the pitch, which allowed him to drop into midfield to be more involved in the buildup of plays and linkup with his teammates. This new role also gave him more opportunities to find spaces from deeper positions, lose his markers, and make attacking runs into the area, which enabled to maintain his consistent goalscoring record, despite being played further back from goal.

With Milan, however, Bacca at times had a difficult relationship with his manager Vincenzo Montella playing in a more advanced and offensive role as a centre-forward, due to his low defensive and creative contribution, as well as his limited movement off the ball outside the box. Although Bacca was praised in the media for his goalscoring record, ability to make attacking runs, and his ratio of goals per minutes played at the club, often requiring few touches and chances to score, he was also criticised for the overall quality of some of his performances, in spite of his goalscoring and finishing ability. Frequent criticisms of Bacca included his tendency to mainly operate in the centre of the penalty area, not contribute to the build-up of attacking moves, and not attempt to create chances for himself; this, in turn, led him to be isolated from his team's overall play when Milan struggled to create chances. Bacca's positional sense, goalscoring ability, opportunism in the area, and tendency to play off the last defender and receive offside calls, as well as his limited work-rate off the ball, drew comparisons with former Milan striker Filippo Inzaghi.

== Career statistics ==
=== Club ===
As of match played 22 January 2026

Appearances and goals by club, season and competition
Club	Season	League			National cup (Note: Includes Copa Colombia, Belgian Cup, Copa del Rey, Coppa Italia)		Continental		Other		Total	
Club	Season	Division	Apps	Goals	Apps	Goals	Apps	Goals	Apps	Goals	Apps	Goals
Barranquilla (loan)	2006	Primera B	27	12	0	0	—		—		27	12
Minervén (loan)	2007	Venezuelan Segunda División	29	12	0	0	—		—		29	12
Barranquilla (loan)	2008	Primera B	19	14	0	0	—		—		19	14
Junior	2009	Primera A	29	12	12	11	—		—		41	23
Junior	2010	Primera A	32	18	0	0	2 (Note: Appearances in Copa Libertadores)	0	—		34	18
Junior	2011	Primera A	36	20	11	8	8	4	—		55	32
Junior	Total		97	50	23	19	10	4	—		130	73
Club Brugge	2011–12	Belgian Pro League	10	3	0	0	0	0	—		10	3
Club Brugge	2012–13	Belgian Pro League	35	25	2	0	7 (Note: Appearances in UEFA Europa League)	3	—		44	28
Club Brugge	Total		45	28	2	0	7	3	—		54	31
Sevilla	2013–14	La Liga	35	14	1	0	16	7	—		52	21
Sevilla	2014–15	La Liga	37	20	3	1	15	7	1 (Note: Appearance in UEFA Super Cup)	0	56	28
Sevilla	Total		72	34	4	1	31	14	1	0	108	49
AC Milan	2015–16	Serie A	38	18	5	2	—		—		43	20
AC Milan	2016–17	Serie A	32	13	1	1	—		1 (Note: Appearance in Supercoppa Italiana)	0	34	14
AC Milan	Total		70	31	6	3	—		1	0	77	34
Villarreal (loan)	2017–18	La Liga	35	15	3	1	6	2	—		44	18
Villarreal	2018–19	La Liga	33	6	3	3	7	2	—		43	11
Villarreal	2019–20	La Liga	19	2	4	3	—		—		23	5
Villarreal	2020–21	La Liga	23	5	3	1	9	3	—		35	9
Villarreal	Total		110	28	13	8	22	7	—		145	43
Granada	2021–22	La Liga	17	0	2	1	—		—		19	1
Junior	2022	Primera A	20	9	6	0	—		—		26	9
Junior	2023	Primera A	45	19	2	2	1 (Note: Appearance in Copa Sudamericana)	0	—		48	21
Junior	2024	Primera A	45	20	2	0	8	4	2 (Note: Appearances in Superliga Colombiana)	1	57	25
Junior	2025	Primera A	19	4	0	0	1	0	—		20	4
Junior	2026	Primera A	0	0	0	0	0	0	0	0	0	0
Junior	Total		129	52	10	2	10	4	2	1	151	59
Career total			615	260	60	34	80	32	4	1	759	327

=== International ===
Appearances and goals by national team and year
National team	Year	Apps	Goals
Colombia	2010	1	1
Colombia	2011	0	0
Colombia	2012	1	1
Colombia	2013	6	0
Colombia	2014	7	4
Colombia	2015	10	2
Colombia	2016	13	5
Colombia	2017	5	1
Colombia	2018	9	2
Total		52	16

Scores and results list Colombia's goal tally first, score column indicates score after each Bacca goal.

List of international goals scored by Carlos Bacca
No.	Date	Venue	Opponent	Score	Result	Competition
1	11 August 2010	Estadio Hernando Siles, La Paz, Bolivia	Bolivia	1–0	1–1	Friendly
2	17 October 2012	Estadio Metropolitano Roberto Meléndez, Barranquilla, Colombia	Cameroon	2–0	3–0	Friendly
3	31 May 2014	Estadio Pedro Bidegain, Buenos Aires, Argentina	Senegal	2–0	2–2	Friendly
4	10 October 2014	Red Bull Arena, Harrison, United States	El Salvador	2–0	3–0	Friendly
5	10 October 2014	Red Bull Arena, Harrison, United States	El Salvador	3–0	3–0	Friendly
6	14 November 2014	Craven Cottage, London, England	United States	1–1	2–1	Friendly
7	26 March 2015	Bahrain National Stadium, Riffa, Bahrain	Bahrain	1–0	6–0	Friendly
8	8 September 2015	Red Bull Arena, Harrison, United States	Peru	1–0	1–1	Friendly
9	24 March 2016	Estadio Hernando Siles, La Paz, Bolivia	Bolivia	2–0	3–2	2018 FIFA World Cup qualification
10	29 March 2016	Estadio Metropolitano Roberto Meléndez, Barranquilla, Colombia	Ecuador	1–0	3–1	2018 FIFA World Cup qualification
11	29 March 2016	Estadio Metropolitano Roberto Meléndez, Barranquilla, Colombia	Ecuador	3–0	3–1	2018 FIFA World Cup qualification
12	7 June 2016	Rose Bowl, Pasadena, United States	Paraguay	1–0	2–1	Copa América Centenario
13	25 June 2016	University of Phoenix Stadium, Glendale, United States	United States	1–0	1–0	Copa América Centenario
14	14 November 2017	Chongqing Olympic Sports Center, Chongqing, China	China	2–0	4–0	Friendly
15	11 October 2018	Raymond James Stadium, Tampa, United States	United States	2–2	4–2	Friendly
16	16 October 2018	Red Bull Arena, Harrison, United States	Costa Rica	1–0	3–1	Friendly

== Honours ==
Atlético Junior

- Categoría Primera A: 2010–II, 2011–II, 2023–II, 2025–II

Sevilla

- UEFA Europa League: 2013–14, 2014–15

AC Milan

- Supercoppa Italiana: 2016

Villarreal

- UEFA Europa League: 2020–21

Colombia

- Copa América third place: 2016

Individual

- Belgian First Division Top Goalscorer: 2012–13
- Belgian Pro League Best Player: 2012–13
- LaLiga Best South American Player: 2013–14
- UEFA Europa League Squad of the Season: 2014–15

Sporting positions
Preceded by Sebastián Viera	Atlético Junior captain 2023-	Succeeded by Incumbent
