= Johan Venegas =

Costa Rican football player (born 1988)

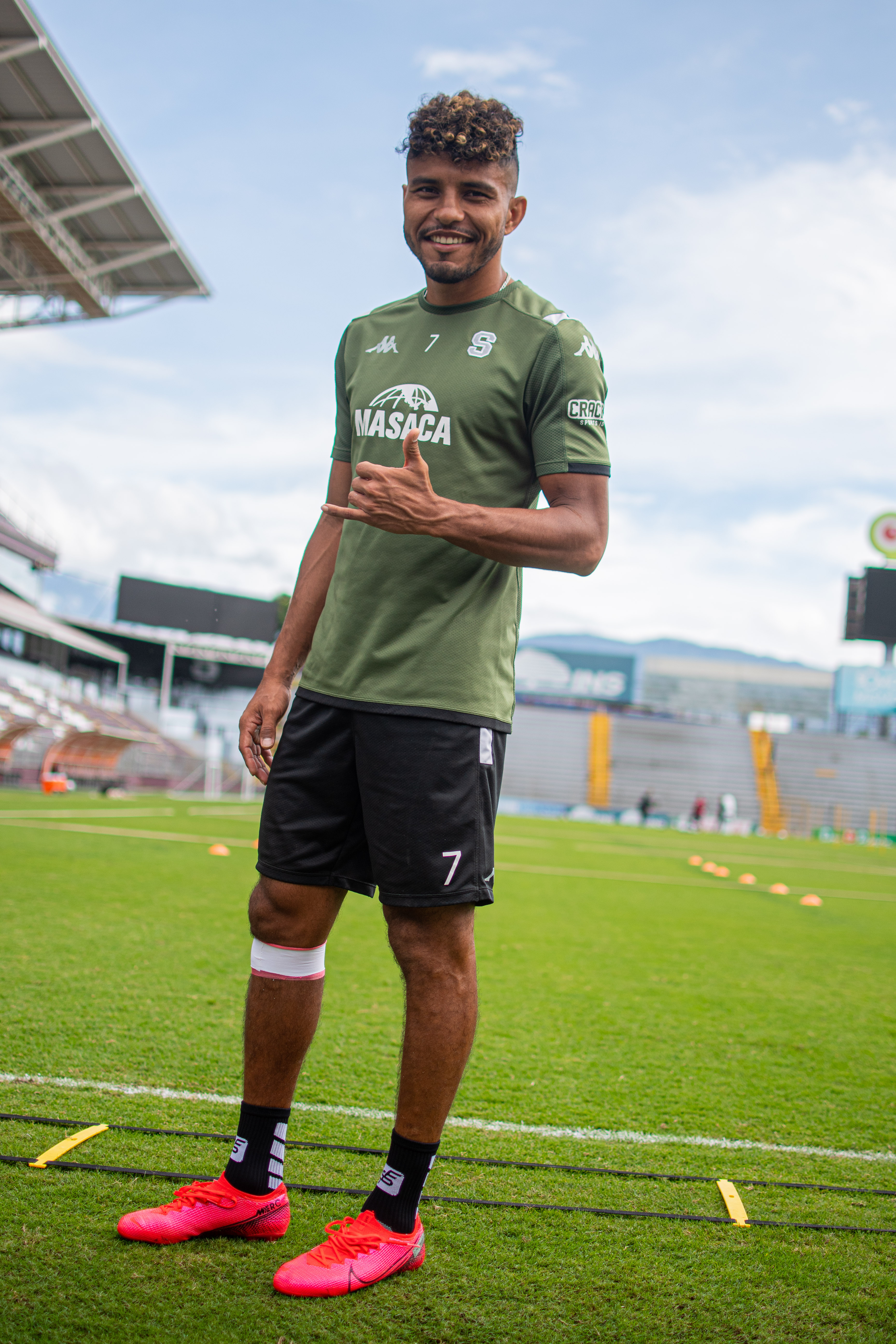
- Venegas with Saprissa in 2020

Personal information
- Full name: Johan Alberto Venegas Ulloa
- Date of birth: 27 November 1988 (age 37)
- Place of birth: Limón, Costa Rica
- Height: 1.83 m (6 ft 0 in)
- Positions: Winger; forward

Team information
- Current team: Escorpiones
- Number: 21

Senior career*
Years	Team	Apps	(Gls)
2009–2012	Santos	58	(3)
2011	→ Barrio México (loan)	4	(0)
2012–2013	Puntarenas	37	(12)
2013–2015	Alajuelense	72	(17)
2015–2016	Montreal Impact	32	(2)
2017–2018	Minnesota United	22	(2)
2018–2020	Saprissa	112	(43)
2021–2024	Alajuelense	129	(59)
2024–2025	Guanacasteca	29	(9)
2025–2026	Cartaginés	26	(5)
2026–	Escorpiones	0	(0)

International career^{‡}
2014–2022	Costa Rica	84	(11)
- * Club domestic league appearances and goals as of 15 April 2025 ‡ National team caps and goals as of 23:51, 1 December 2022 (UTC)

Johan Alberto Venegas Ulloa (born 27 November 1988) is a Costa Rican professional footballer who plays for Escorpiones and the Costa Rica national team.

== Club career ==
Venegas started his career at Santos de Guápiles and had a short loan spell at Barrio México in 2011. He joined Puntarenas in 2012, and had a big season with the club scoring 12 goals in 37 appearances. This led to a move to top club Alajuelense in 2013. In his first year for Alajuelense Vanegas quickly established himself as a starter on the club making 34 appearances and scoring 4 goals. The following season, he continued his fine form and ended the season with a career high 13 goals in 38 matches.

In July 2015, Venegas joined Major League Soccer team Montreal Impact, after impressing the Canadian club during the 2014–15 CONCACAF Champions League. During his time with Montreal, Venegas appeared in 32 league matches and scored two goals. He also made seven appearances during the Playoffs, scoring one goal.

On 13 December 2016, Venegas was traded to Minnesota United FC in exchange for Chris Duvall.

After spending the 2017 season with Minnesota, the club announced that Venegas would be loaned to Costa Rican side Deportivo Saprissa for 2018. His contract with Minnesota ended following the 2018 season.

On 26 December 2020, Venegas was announced as Alajuelense's new signing.

== International career ==
Venegas made his debut for the Costa Rica national team in the September 2014 Copa Centroamericana opening match against Nicaragua, in which he scored the third goal. He was again on target in his second game against Panama, netting Costa Rica's 100th goal in all Copa Centroamerica tournaments in the process.

In May 2018 he was named in Costa Rica's 23-man squad for the 2018 FIFA World Cup in Russia.

== Career statistics ==
As of match played 1 December 2022

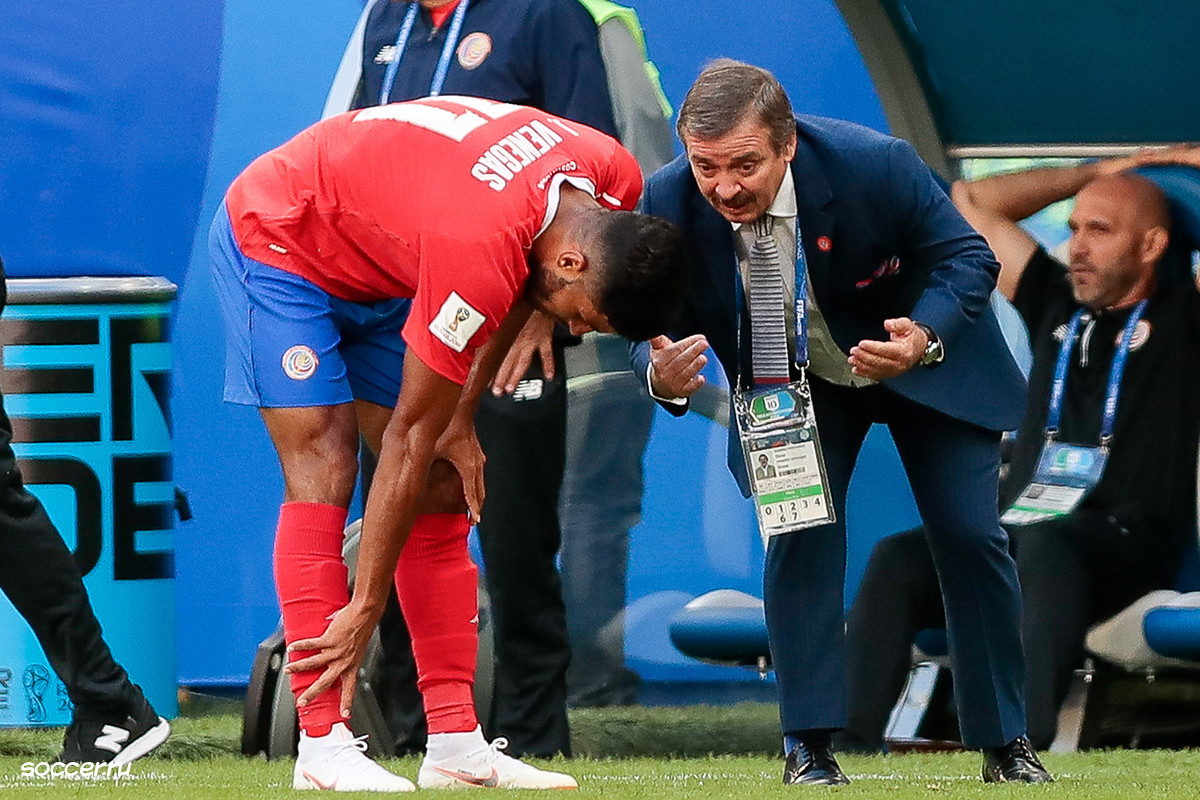
Venegas receiving instructions from coach Óscar Ramírez at the 2018 FIFA World Cup

Appearances and goals by national team and year
National team	Year	Apps	Goals
Costa Rica	2014	6	3
Costa Rica	2015	14	1
Costa Rica	2016	10	3
Costa Rica	2017	14	2
Costa Rica	2018	7	1
Costa Rica	2019	3	1
Costa Rica	2020	5	0
Costa Rica	2021	14	0
Costa Rica	2022	11	0
Total		84	11

As of match played 14 November 2019
Scores and results list Costa Rica's goal tally first, score column indicates score after each Venegas goal.

List of international goals scored by Johan Venegas
No.	Date	Venue	Cap	Opponent	Score	Result	Competition
1	3 September 2014	RFK Stadium, Washington, United States	1	Nicaragua	3–0	3–0	2015 Copa Centroamericana
2	7 September 2014	Cotton Bowl, Dallas, United States	2	Panama	1–2	2–2	2015 Copa Centroamericana
3	13 November 2014	Estadio Centenario, Montevideo, Uruguay	6	Uruguay	3–3	3–3	Friendly
4	11 June 2015	Estadio Reino de León, León, Spain	10	Spain	1–0	1–2	Friendly
5	29 March 2016	Estadio Nacional, San José, Costa Rica	22	Jamaica	3–0	3–0	2018 FIFA World Cup qualification
6	11 June 2016	NRG Stadium, Houston, United States	25	Colombia	1–0	3–2	Copa América Centenario
7	15 November 2016	Estadio Nacional, San José, Costa Rica	30	United States	1–0	4–0	2018 FIFA World Cup qualification
8	15 January 2017	Estadio Rommel Fernandez, Panama City, Panama	32	Belize	2–0	3–0	2017 Copa Centroamericana
9	10 October 2017	Estadio Rommel Fernandez, Panama City, Panama	42	Panama	1–0	1–2	2018 FIFA World Cup qualification
10	3 June 2018	Estadio Nacional, San José, Costa Rica	45	Northern Ireland	1–0	3–0	Friendly
11	14 November 2019	Ergilio Hato Stadium, Willemstad, Curaçao	53	Curaçao	1–0	2–1	2019–20 CONCACAF Nations League A

== Honours ==
Alajuelense

- Liga FPD: Apertura 2013

Saprissa

- Liga FPD: Clausura 2018, Clausura 2020
- CONCACAF League: 2019

Costa Rica

- Copa Centroamericana: 2014

Individual

- CONCACAF League Golden Ball: 2019
- CONCACAF League Golden Boot: 2019, 2020
