= Max Hilaire =

French-Haitian footballer (born 1985)

Personal information
- Date of birth: 6 December 1985 (age 40)
- Place of birth: Bondy, France
- Height: 1.90 m (6 ft 3 in)
- Position: Midfielder

Youth career
- 1993–2000: SF Blanc Mesnil
- 2000–2003: FC Aulnay-sous-Bois
- 2003–2007: AS Chelles

Senior career*
Years	Team	Apps	(Gls)
2007–2009	Noisy Le Grand FC		
2009–2012	Bayonne	49	(1)
2012–2013	Pau	29	(1)
2013–2014	Tarbes Pyrénées	26	(0)
2014–2015	Consolat Marseille	30	(2)
2015–2016	Cholet	17	(0)
2016–2017	Consolat Marseille	26	(1)
2017–2019	Chambly	14	(0)
2019–2022	Stade Poitevin	42	(2)
2022–2023	Genêts Anglet	13	(0)
2023–2024	Saint-Paul Sport	23	(0)
2024–2025	Bayonne	14	(0)

International career
2011–2017	Haiti	15	(0)
- * Club domestic league appearances and goals as of 17:32, 16 October 2024 (UTC)

Max Hilaire (born 6 December 1985) is a Haitian former professional footballer who played as a midfielder.

== Club career ==
Born in Bondy, France, Hilaire started his career in 1993 with Blanc Mesnil SF and joined FC Aulnay-sous-Bois in 2000. After three years at Aulnay he left the club and signed with Association Sportive Chelles Football for the 2003–04 season. He played four years with AS Chelles before joining Noisy Le Grand FC in 2007. In the spring 2009 announced his signing with Aviron Bayonnais FC.

In 2012, Hilaire transferred to Pau FC of the Championnat de France amateur.

== International career ==
Hilaire made his debut for the Haiti national team during 2014 World Cup CONCACAF qualification.
