= Tele Haiti =

Haitian cable TV company

- Country: Haiti

Programming
- Languages: French, Haitian Creole

Ownership
- Owner: Access Haiti S.A.

History
- Launched: December 13, 1959; 66 years ago

Links
- Website: telehaiti.ht

Tele Haiti (French: Télé Haïti, stylized TeleHaiti) is a Haitian telecommunications company that operates a cable television network. It was founded in 1959 as Haiti's first television station, and it operated as a terrestrial service during its first decade. It is owned by Access Haiti S.A.

== History ==
Télé Haïti's first broadcast took place on December 13, 1959. The station was founded under the initiative of American Gerald Bartell, and its transmitter was located in the sector of Boutiliers, broadcasting on VHF channel 5. The channel's financial difficulties in its early years resulted in a cut of its broadcasting hours (from over six hours every day of the week, to just one day per week from March 15, 1965).

A new contract signed between Tele Haiti and the Haitian State in December 1969 enabled the establishment of a cable television network, while also authorizing the channel to begin its color broadcasts. The system debuted in 1971, where Tele Haiti inaugurated a new two-channel system, on channels 2 and 4, subsequently abandoning the terrestrial station on channel 5.

In December 1974 the Haitian government announced Tele Haiti's end of the television monopoly — which generated uncertainties among the American investors (which controlled 87% of the company's stocks) over possible economical compensations on that regard— which was achieved with the launch of National Television of Haiti in 1979.

In 1982, under the helm of Philippe Bayard, and with the company nearing bankruptcy, the process to start relays of foreign channels started. In July 1985, the company's headquarters located at the Jean Jacques Dessalines Boulevard was destroyed by a fire, for which in 1987 a new building at the Harry Truman Boulevard in Port-au-Prince was built.

After being heavily damaged by the 2010 earthquake and suspending its operations, Télé Haiti announced the rebuilding of its network after the company's acquisition by Access Haiti S.A., restarting its activities in April 2012, this time by means of a wireless digital television system (unlike the cable system used before).
