= Gustavo Rossi =

Argentinian football referee (born 1973)

- Full name: Gustavo Fabián Rossi Fagivoli
- Born: December 10, 1973 (age 52); Santa Fe, Argentina

Domestic
Years	League	Role
–2019	Argentine Primera División	Assistant referee

International
Years	League	Role

Gustavo Fabián Rossi Fagivoli (born 10 December 1973) is an Argentine former football assistant referee. Born in Santa Fe, he officiated in the Argentine Primera División and in international competitions such as the Copa América, Copa Libertadores and Copa Sudamericana. After his retirement in 2019, he became involved in referee instruction and training within the Argentine Football Association (AFA).

== Refereeing career ==
Rossi began his refereeing career in Santa Fe Province before advancing to the national level. He served primarily as an assistant referee in the Argentine Primera División.

He participated in several editions of the Copa América, as well as fixtures in the Copa Libertadores and Copa Sudamericana. Rossi was also appointed to nine Superclásico matches between Boca Juniors and River Plate. His final match as an assistant referee took place on 16 May 2019 in the Copa de la Superliga, when Boca Juniors defeated Vélez Sársfield.

== Later career ==
After retiring from active refereeing, Rossi joined the Consejo Federal of the AFA, working on referee instruction and development in the interior of Argentina. He also participated in grassroots events, such as directing matches at the youth tournament Lasallanito in Santa Fe.

In 2023, he took part in the presentation of a referee school in Tres Arroyos, alongside Pablo Pompei and Claudio Aumente.

Rossi has described the pressures of refereeing in Argentina, including the criticism and expectations placed on match officials, and has reflected on his return to local football in Santa Fe, where he began his career.
