= Daniel Fedorczuk =

Uruguayan football referee

Daniel Adán Fedorczuk
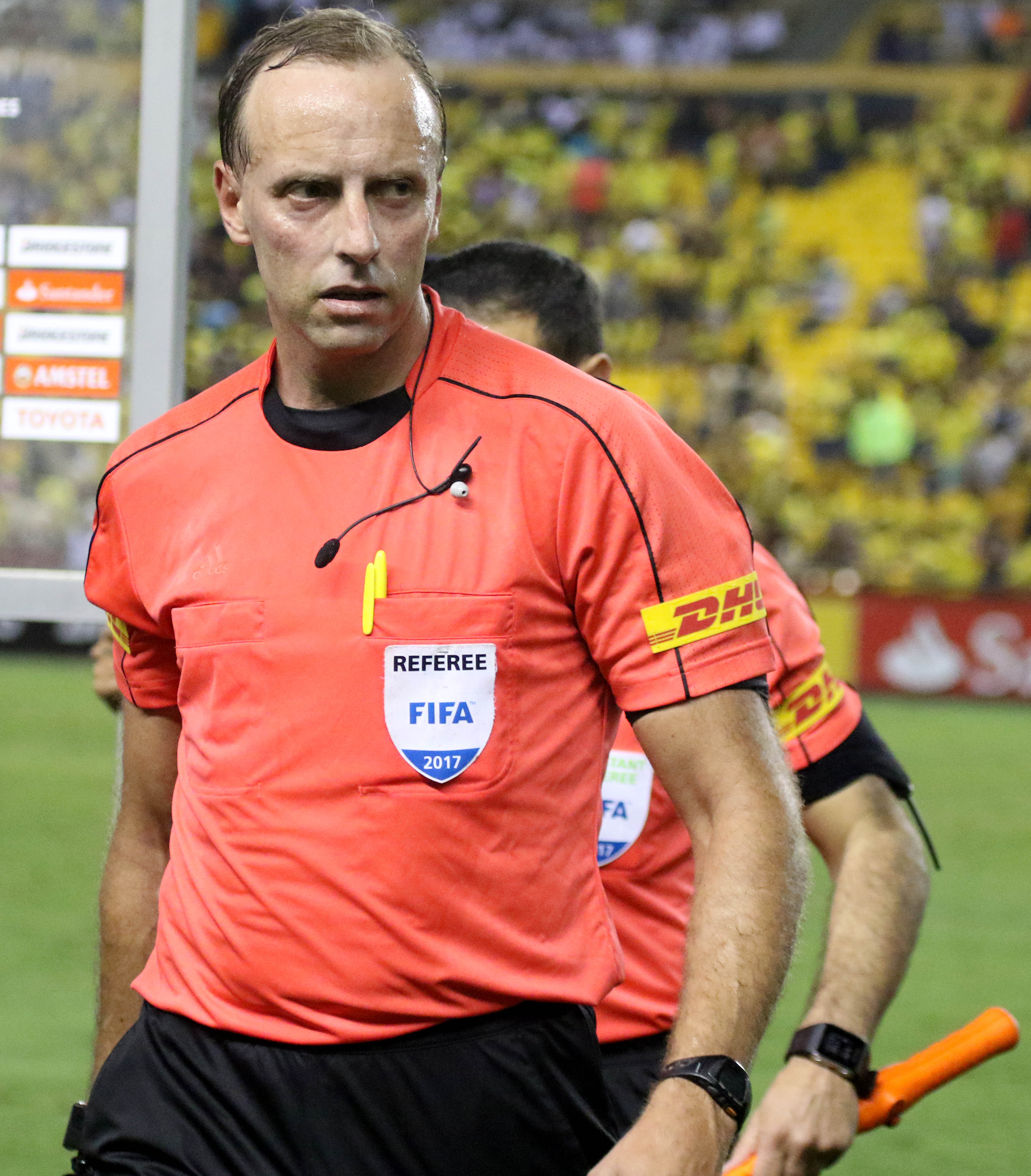
- Full name: Daniel Adán Fedorczuk Betancour
- Born: 2 May 1976 (age 50); Montevideo, Uruguay

Domestic
Years	League	Role

International
Years	League	Role
2011–	FIFA listed	Referee

Daniel Adán Fedorczuk Betancour (born 2 May 1976) is a Uruguayan professional football referee. He has been a full international for FIFA since 2011. He refereed some matches in Copa Libertadores.

Fedorczuk was initially named as one of three reserve officials for the 2016 Copa América Centenario, but eventually served as a match official during the tournament, notably refereeing the 6 June match between Argentina and Chile.
