= Héber Lopes =

Brazilian football referee (born 1972)

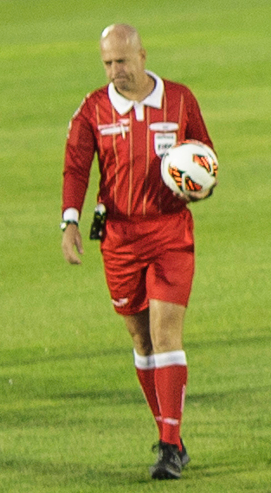
- Full name: Héber Roberto Lopes
- Born: 13 July 1972 (age 54); Londrina, Paraná, Brazil

Domestic
| Years | League | Role |

International
| Years | League | Role |
| 2002–17 | FIFA listed | Referee |

Héber Roberto Lopes (born 13 July 1972) is a Brazilian football referee. He refereed at 2014 FIFA World Cup qualifiers and the Copa América Centenario Final.

== Refereeing career ==
After taking up professional refereeing in 1995, he began officiating at national level in Brazil in 1997.

Lopes was FIFA listed between 2002 and 2017.

On 26 June 2016, Lopes was the referee of the Copa América Centenario Final, contested between Argentina and Chile. He sent off Chilean Marcelo Díaz in the 28th minute for a second bookable offence, before showing a straight red in the 43rd minute to Marcos Rojo of Argentina.
