= 2007 ANAPROF Apertura =

ANAPROF
- Season: Apertura 2007
- Champions: Tauro F.C.
- Relegated: -
- -: -

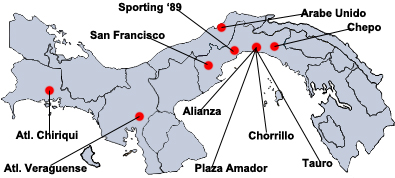
ANAPROF 2007 Apertura team distribution

The ANAPROF Apertura 2007 season (officially "Torneo Apertura 2007") started on February 24, 2007. On May 27, 2007 the Apertura 2007 finalized with Tauro F.C. crowned seven time ANAPROF champion after beating San Francisco F.C. 2-0, earning Tauro the right to participate in the Copa Interclubes UNCAF 2007.

== Changes for 2007 Apertura ==
- The Grand Championship format was abandoned, therefore there will be two champions from now on: Apertura and Clausura.
- Sporting '89 returned to their former name: Sporting San Miguelito.

== Teams ==
Club	City	Stadium
Alianza F.C.	Panama City	Estadio Camping Resort
CD Árabe Unido	Colon	Estadio Armando Dely Valdés
Atlético Chiriquí	David	Estadio San Cristóbal
Atlético Veragüense	Santiago	Estadio Toco Castillo
Chepo F.C.	Chepo	Estadio José de la Luz Thompson
Municipal Chorrillo	Panama City	Estadio Municipal de Balboa
Plaza Amador	Panama City	Estadio Rommel Fernández
San Francisco F.C.	La Chorrera	Estadio Agustín Sánchez
Sporting San Miguelito	San Miguelito	Parque de Deportes de los Andes No.2
Tauro F.C.	Panama City	Estadio Giancarlo Gronchi de Pedregal

== Standings ==
Pos	Team	Pld	W	D	L	GF	GA	GD	Pts	Qualification
1	Tauro F.C.	18	11	5	2	37	15	+22	38	Semifinal
2	Arabe Unido	18	9	3	6	26	20	+6	30	Semifinal
3	San Francisco F.C.	18	9	2	7	25	17	+8	29	Semifinal
4	Municipal Chorrillo	18	8	4	6	29	25	+4	28	Semifinal
5	Chepo F.C.	18	8	4	6	27	27	0	28	
6	Atlético Chiriquí	18	7	4	7	24	13	+11	25	
7	Plaza Amador	18	5	6	7	21	25	−4	21	
8	Sporting San Miguelito	18	5	5	8	17	20	−3	20	
9	Alianza F.C.	18	5	2	11	25	36	−11	17	
10	Atlético Veragüense	18	4	3	11	23	46	−23	15	

== Results table ==
Home \ Away	ALI	ÁRA	ACH	AVE	CHE	MUN	PLA	SAN	SPO	TAU
Alianza F.C.	—	2–1	0–4	5–2	2–2	0–1	0–2	2–1	1–2	2–3
Árabe Unido	0–1	—	1–1	6–1	2–1	1–3	3–1	0–2	0–0	0–0
Atlético Chiriquí	3–2	0–1	—	2–0	2–0	1–1	3–3	1–2	1–0	1–2
Atlético Veragüense	2–1	1–2	0–0	—	2–2	2–1	1–2	0–2	1–0	1–3
Chepo F.C.	1–0	2–1	3–1	6–3	—	0–2	2–1	2–0	0–0	0–0
Municipal Chorrillo	4–2	0–1	1–0	2–1	4–1	—	2–2	1–2	0–1	1–4
Plaza Amador	1–1	0–2	0–2*	2–3	2–3	0–0	—	1–0	2–1	0–0
San Francisco	2–1	1–2	4–1	4–2	2–0	0–1	0–0	—	2–0	0–1
Sporting	1–2	0–2	0–1	1–1	1–2	3–3	2–1	1–0	—	3–0
Tauro F.C.	4–1	4–1	3–0	5–0	2–0	4–2	0–1	1–1	1–1	—

Legend: Blue = home team win; Yellow = draw; Red = away team win.
- [*]Plaza Amador-Atl. Chiriquí game was suspended after 67' minutes were played when incidents in the stadium, this lead for the remaining 23 minutes to be played closed doors, and no teams could change their starting line up. That game ended 1-0 in favor of Plaza Amador with goal from Alfredo Hernandez. But the Atl. Chiriquí denounced that Jean Estrebi (player in Plaza Amador) played the remaining 23 minutes without having starting the starting line up on the nights of the incident. The FEPAFUT ordered for the game to be replayed completely on May 9. Atl. Chiriquí won the game 2-0.

== Final round ==
Semifinals (agg)
Tauro F.C.	2
Municipal Chorrillo	1
Arabe Unido	2
San Francisco F.C.	2

Final
Tauro F.C.	2
San Francisco F.C.	1

=== Semifinals 1st Leg (Semifinales - Juego de ida) ===
May 16, 2007

Tauro F.C.	1-0	Municipal Chorrillo
Edwin Aguilar

Estadio Rommel Fernández

May 16, 2007

Árabe Unido	1-1	San Francisco F.C.
Eduardo McTaggart		Manuel Torres

Estadio Armando Dely Valdés

=== Semifinals 2nd Leg (Semifinales - Juego de vuelta) ===
May 20, 2007

Municipal Chorrillo	1-1	Tauro F.C.
Johnny Ruiz		Rolando Escobar

Estadio Balboa

May 19, 2007

San Francisco F.C.	1-1	Árabe Unido
Temístocles Pérez		Fausto Scolaro
Penalties
Temistocles Perez (penalty missed); José Justavino (penalty scored); Santiago de Alba (penalty scored); Jair Carrasquilla (penalty scored)	3-0	Gustavo Alvarez (penalty missed); Nahill Carroll (penalty missed); Armando Cooper (penalty missed)

Estadio Agustín Sánchez

San Francisco advances to final 3-0 on penalties

=== Final ===
May 27, 2007

Tauro F.C.	2-0	San Francisco F.C.
Alberto Skinner; Juan de Dios Pérez

Estadio Rommel Fernández

Apertura 2007 champion

7th title

== Top goalscorers ==
Position	Player	Scored for	Goals
1	(Panama) Edwin Aguilar	Tauro	14
2	(Panama) César Medina	Alianza	12
3	(Panama) Gabriel Torres	Chepo	11
4	(Panama) Alejandro Dawson	Chorrillo	9
5	(Colombia) José Julio	Chiriquí	7
-	(Panama) Eric Quiroz	Veragüense	7
7	(Panama) Oscar Vargas	Chiriquí	6
-	(Panama) Eduardo McTaggart	Arabe Unido	6
-	(Panama) Alberto Skinner	Tauro	6
10	(Colombia) Héctor Nazarith	Tauro	5

== Goalscorers by team ==
Club	Club goals	Goals	Nat.	Player
Alianza F.C.	25	12	(Panama)	César Medina
Alianza F.C.	25	3	(Panama)	Miguel Castillo
Alianza F.C.	25	3	(Panama)	Neftalí Díaz
Alianza F.C.	25	2	(Panama)	Abdul Pinto
Alianza F.C.	25	2	(Panama)	César Vergara
Alianza F.C.	25	2	(Panama)	Fernando Hutardo
Alianza F.C.	25	1	(Panama)	Amaral Rivera
Arabe Unido	28	6	(Panama)	Eduardo McTaggart
Arabe Unido	28	4	(Panama)	Jimmy Duarte
Arabe Unido	28	4	(Panama)	Anthony Basil
Arabe Unido	28	3	(Panama)	Armando Cooper
Arabe Unido	28	3	(Panama)	Nelson Barahona
Arabe Unido	28	2	(Panama)	Publio Rodriguez
Arabe Unido	28	2	(Panama)	David Daniels
Arabe Unido	28	1	(Colombia)	Fidel Mahemour
Arabe Unido	28	1	(Panama)	Amilcar Henríquez
Arabe Unido	28	1	(Panama)	Gustavo Álvarez
Arabe Unido	28	1	(Panama)	Fausto Scolaro
Atlético Chiriquí	24	7	(Colombia)	José Julio
Atlético Chiriquí	24	6	(Panama)	Oscar Vargas
Atlético Chiriquí	24	2	(Panama)	Richard Miranda
Atlético Chiriquí	24	2	(Panama)	Benjamín Ortega
Atlético Chiriquí	24	2	(Panama)	Eybir Bonaga
Atlético Chiriquí	24	2	(Panama)	Clive Trotman
Atlético Chiriquí	24	1	(Colombia)	Rodman Gonzalez
Atlético Chiriquí	24	1	(Belize)	Bryan Simpson
Atlético Chiriquí	24	1	(Colombia)	Álvaro Borjas
Atlético Veragüense	23	7	(Panama)	Eric Quiroz
Atlético Veragüense	23	4	(Panama)	Manuel Mosquera
Atlético Veragüense	23	2	(Panama)	José Gómez
Atlético Veragüense	23	2	(Panama)	Josué Brown
Atlético Veragüense	23	1	(Panama)	José Luis Gonzalez
Atlético Veragüense	23	1	(Panama)	Miguel Gonzalez
Atlético Veragüense	23	1	(Panama)	Benjamín Aguirre
Atlético Veragüense	23	1	(Panama)	Abdiel Sanchez
Atlético Veragüense	23	1	(Panama)	Jesús Gonzalez
Atlético Veragüense	23	1	(Panama)	Manuel Bonilla
Atlético Veragüense	23	1	(Panama)	Ramón Mancias (OG)
Atlético Veragüense	23	1	(Panama)	Juan Soto
Chepo F.C.	27	11	(Panama)	Gabriel Torres
Chepo F.C.	27	3	(Panama)	Delano Welch
Chepo F.C.	27	3	(Panama)	Armando Gun
Chepo F.C.	27	1	(Panama)	Carlos Martínez
Chepo F.C.	27	1	(Panama)	Alberto Quesada
Chepo F.C.	27	1	(Panama)	Javier de la Rosa
Chepo F.C.	27	1	(Panama)	Rómulo Ramos
Chepo F.C.	27	1	(Panama)	Carlos Martínez
Chepo F.C.	27	1	(Panama)	Gerardo Barrios
Chepo F.C.	27	1	(Panama)	Ismael Mena
Chepo F.C.	27	1	(Panama)	Gustavo Álvarez (OG)
Chepo F.C.	27	1	(Panama)	Celso Polo
Chepo F.C.	27	1	(Panama)	Luis Jaramillo
Municipal Chorrillo	30	9	(Panama)	Alejandro Dawson
Municipal Chorrillo	30	4	(Panama)	Johnny Ruiz
Municipal Chorrillo	30	3	(Panama)	Julio Medina III
Municipal Chorrillo	30	3	(Panama)	Silvio Morelos
Municipal Chorrillo	30	2	(Panama)	Alberto Quintero
Municipal Chorrillo	30	2	(Panama)	Marcos Villareal
Municipal Chorrillo	30	2	(Panama)	Francisco López
Municipal Chorrillo	30	1	(Panama)	Bernando Palma
Municipal Chorrillo	30	1	(Argentina)	Santiago Valdes
Municipal Chorrillo	30	1	(Colombia)	Julio Valero
Municipal Chorrillo	30	1	(Panama)	Roberto Stewart
Municipal Chorrillo	30	1	(Panama)	Raúl Moreno
Plaza Amador	21	5	(Panama)	Ángel Lombardo
Plaza Amador	21	3	(Panama)	Omar Hidalgo
Plaza Amador	21	3	(Panama)	Alfredo Hernandez
Plaza Amador	21	2	(Panama)	Joel Solanilla
Plaza Amador	21	1	(Panama)	Ricardo Buitrago
Plaza Amador	21	1	(Panama)	Juan Villalobos
Plaza Amador	21	1	(Panama)	Engie Mitre
Plaza Amador	21	1	(Colombia)	Álvaro Borjas (OG)
Plaza Amador	21	1	(Panama)	Alberto Blanco
Plaza Amador	21	1	(Panama)	Ricardo Paschall
Plaza Amador	21	1	(Panama)	Jean McLean
Plaza Amador	21	1	(Panama)	Cristian Vega
San Francisco F.C.	27	5	(Panama)	José Justavino
San Francisco F.C.	27	4	(Panama)	Jair Carrasquilla
San Francisco F.C.	27	4	(Panama)	Temístocles Pérez
San Francisco F.C.	27	3	(Panama)	Ricardo Phillips
San Francisco F.C.	27	3	(Panama)	Manuel Torres
San Francisco F.C.	27	2	(Panama)	Gilberto Walter
San Francisco F.C.	27	1	(Panama)	Raúl Loo
San Francisco F.C.	27	1	(Panama)	Jaime Giron
San Francisco F.C.	27	1	(Panama)	Miguel Olivares
San Francisco F.C.	27	1	(Colombia)	Santiago de Alba
San Francisco F.C.	27	1	(Colombia)	José Julio (OG)
San Francisco F.C.	27	1	(Panama)	Nicolás Castillo
Sporting San Miguelito	17	2	(Panama)	Luis Morales
Sporting San Miguelito	17	2	(Panama)	Alexis King
Sporting San Miguelito	17	2	(Panama)	Pascual Ramos
Sporting San Miguelito	17	1	(Panama)	José Panezo
Sporting San Miguelito	17	1	(Panama)	Luis Mendoza
Sporting San Miguelito	17	1	(Panama)	César Vergara (OG)
Sporting San Miguelito	17	1	(Panama)	Osvaldo Solanilla
Sporting San Miguelito	17	1	(Panama)	José Reyes
Sporting San Miguelito	17	1	(Panama)	Abel Vega
Sporting San Miguelito	17	1	(Panama)	Rodrigo Tello
Sporting San Miguelito	17	1	(Panama)	Luis Ovalle
Sporting San Miguelito	17	1	(Panama)	José Venegas
Sporting San Miguelito	17	1	(Panama)	Enrique Valencia
Sporting San Miguelito	17	1	(Panama)	Eladio Mitre
Tauro F.C.	41	14	(Panama)	Edwin Aguilar
Tauro F.C.	41	6	(Panama)	Alberto Skinner
Tauro F.C.	41	5	(Colombia)	Héctor Nazarith
Tauro F.C.	41	4	(Panama)	Brunet Hay
Tauro F.C.	41	3	(Panama)	Rolando Escobar
Tauro F.C.	41	2	(Panama)	Luis Henríquez
Tauro F.C.	41	2	(Panama)	Juan de Dios Perez
Tauro F.C.	41	1	(Panama)	Carlos Rivera
Tauro F.C.	41	1	(Panama)	Oscar McFarlane
Tauro F.C.	41	1	(Panama)	Reggie Arosemena
Tauro F.C.	41	1	(Panama)	Víctor Miranda
Tauro F.C.	41	1	(Panama)	Eduardo Dasent

== Local derby statistics ==
El Super Clasico Nacional - Tauro v Plaza Amador

March 16, 2007

Plaza Amador	0–0	Tauro

Rommel Fernández

April 22, 2007

Tauro	0–1	Plaza Amador
		Joel Solanilla

Rommel Fernández

Clasico del Pueblo - Plaza Amador v Chorillo

February 24, 2007

Chorillo	2–2	Plaza Amador
Marcos Villareal; Silvio Morelos		Alfredo Hernandez; Omar Hidalgo

Balboa

April 13, 2007

Plaza Amador	0–0	Chorillo

Rommel Fernández

Clasico Interiorano - Atlético Chiriquí v Atlético Veragüense

March 16, 2007

Atlético Chiriquí	2–0	Atlético Veragüense
Richard Miranda; Jose Julio

San Cristobal

April 22, 2007

Atlético Veragüense	0–0	Atlético Chiriquí

Toco Castillo
