= 2006 ANAPROF =

ANAPROF
- Season: 2006
- Champions: San Francisco FC; Apertura; Tauro FC; Clausura
- Relegated: -
- -: -

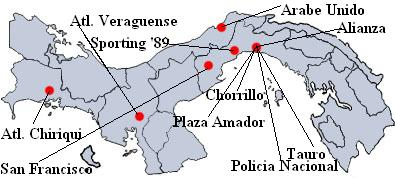
ANAPROF 2006 team distribution

ANAPROF 2006 is the 2006 season of the Panamanian football league, ANAPROF. The season (officially "Torneo Apertura 2007") started on February 3, 2006, with the "Torneo Apertura 2006" and finalized on November 25, 2006, with the Torneo Clausura 2006. The Apertura champion was San Francisco F.C. and the Clausura champion was Tauro F.C., on December 3, 2006, the ANAPROF 2006 final was played and San Francisco was crowned champion over Tauro.

== Change for 2006 ==
- Chorrillo F.C. were renamed Municipal Chorrillo before the start of this season.

== Teams ==
Club	City	Stadium
Alianza F.C.	Panama City	Estadio Camping Resort
CD Árabe Unido	Colon	Estadio Armando Dely Valdés
Atlético Chiriquí	David	Estadio San Cristóbal
Atlético Veragüense	Santiago	Estadio Toco Castillo
Municipal Chorrillo	Panama City	Estadio Municipal de Balboa
Plaza Amador	Panama City	Estadio Rommel Fernández
CD Policia Nacional	Panama City	Estadio Kobe
San Francisco F.C.	La Chorrera	Estadio Agustín Sánchez
Sporting '89	San Miguelito	Estadio Giancarlo Gronchi de Pedregal
Tauro F.C.	Panama City	Estadio Giancarlo Gronchi de Pedregal

== Apertura 2006 ==
=== Standings ===
Pos	Team	Pld	W	D	L	GF	GA	GD	Pts	Qualification
1	Tauro F.C.	18	10	5	3	25	14	+11	35	Semifinal
2	Plaza Amador	18	9	4	5	30	18	+12	31	Semifinal
3	Sporting '89	18	8	6	4	19	13	+6	30	Semifinal
4	San Francisco F.C.	18	7	8	3	20	11	+9	29	Semifinal
5	Municipal Chorrillo	18	5	9	4	20	17	+3	24	
6	Alianza F.C.	18	7	3	8	22	22	0	24	
7	Atlético Veragüense	18	6	6	6	25	27	−2	24	
8	Arabe Unido	18	3	10	5	15	18	−3	19	
9	Atlético Chiriquí	18	4	6	8	18	29	−11	18	
10	Policia Nacional	18	0	5	13	10	35	−25	5	

=== Results table ===
Home \ Away	ALI	ARA	ACH	AVE	MUN	PLA	POL	SAN	SPO	TAU
Alianza F.C.	—	0–0	4–2	1–1	1–2	0–2	4–1	1–0	1–2	2–1
Arabe Unido	0–0	—	1–2	2–2	0–0	1–1	1–0	1–1	2–1	1–1
Atlético Chiriquí	2–3	0–0	—	0–2	1–1	2–1	2–1	0–0	1–2	1–0
Atlético Veragüense	1–2	2–1	3–3	—	2–0	1–2	1–0	1–1	0–2	1–4
Municipal Chorrillo	3–0	2–0	3–1	1–3	—	0–0	2–0	1–1	0–1	0–2
Plaza Amador	1–0	1–0	6–1	3–2	1–0	—	5–1	1–2	1–0	1–2
Policia Nacional	0–2	2–3	0–0	1–1	2–2	0–2	—	1–5	0–0	1–3
San Francisco	1–0	0–0	1–0	3–0	1–1	1–0	0–0	—	1–0	2–2
Sporting '89	2–1	1–1	0–0	1–2	1–1	1–1	1–0	1–0	—	0–0
Tauro F.C.	1–0	2–1	1–0	0–0	0–0	3–1	1–0	1–0	1–3	—

Legend: Blue = home team win; Yellow = draw; Red = away team win.

=== Final round ===
Semifinals (agg)
Tauro F.C.	1
San Francisco	2
Sporting '89	1
Plaza Amador	4

Final
San Francisco F.C.	3
Plaza Amador	0

==== Semifinals 1st leg ====
April 29, 2006

Tauro F.C.	0-0	San Francisco F.C.

Estadio Giancarlo Gronchi de Pedregal

April 29, 2006

Sporting '89	0-2	Plaza Amador

Estadio Rommel Fernández

==== Semifinals 2nd leg ====
May 7, 2006

San Francisco F.C.	2-1	Tauro F.C.

Estadio Agustín Sánchez

May 7, 2006

Plaza Amador	2-1	Sporting '89

Estadio Rommel Fernández

==== Final ====
May 13, 2006

San Francisco F.C.	3-0	Plaza Amador
Joel Jimenez(OG); Gabriel Torres (2)

Estadio Rommel Fernández

Apertura 2006 champion

== Clausura 2006 ==
=== Standings ===
Pos	Team	Pld	W	D	L	GF	GA	GD	Pts	Qualification
1	Tauro F.C.	18	10	7	1	31	17	+14	37	Semifinal
2	San Francisco F.C.	18	11	2	5	40	25	+15	35	Semifinal
3	Arabe Unido	18	10	3	5	30	20	+10	33	Semifinal
4	Atlético Veragüense	18	9	6	3	22	16	+6	33	Semifinal
5	Plaza Amador	18	9	4	5	25	17	+8	31	
6	Alianza F.C.	18	8	2	8	29	31	−2	26	
7	Municipal Chorrillo	18	6	6	6	24	23	+1	24	
8	Sporting '89	18	4	1	13	17	31	−14	13	
9	Atlético Chiriquí	18	2	4	12	14	30	−16	10	
10	Policia Nacional	18	3	1	14	17	39	−22	10	

=== Results table ===
Home \ Away	ALI	ARA	ACH	AVE	MUN	PLA	POL	SAN	SPO	TAU
Alianza F.C.	—	1–2	3–1	2–1	4–3	0–2	2–0	3–2	1–2	0–1
Arabe Unido	3–2	—	1–0	0–1	0–0	3–0	3–1	3–1	3–1	2–3
Atlético Chiriquí	1–2	1–2	—	1–1	1–2	0–0	1–3	0–2	1–0	1–1
Atlético Veragüense	0–0	1–0	0–0	—	3–2	2–1	1–0	2–2	1–2	0–1
Municipal Chorrillo	1–2	1–1	3–2	0–0	—	0–0	3–0	1–2	1–0	2–2
Plaza Amador	4–1	2–1	0–1	0–0	2–0	—	2–0	4–1	2–1	1–2
Policia Nacional	0–3	2–3	1–0	2–3	2–3	1–2	—	1–5	2–1	1–2
San Francisco	4–0	2–1	2–0	1–2	1–0	3–1	3–1	—	3–0	4–5
Sporting '89	3–2	0–1	4–2	2–3	0–1	1–2	0–0	0–1	—	0–2
Tauro F.C.	1–1	1–1	3–1	0–1	1–1	0–0	2–0	1–1	3–0	—

Legend: Blue = home team win; Yellow = draw; Red = away team win.

=== Final round ===
Semifinals (agg)
Arabe Unido	4
San Francisco	3
Atlético Veragüense	1
Tauro F.C.	3

Final
Tauro F.C.	2
Arabe Unido	0

==== Semifinals 1st leg ====
November 12, 2006

Arabe Unido	1-2	San Francisco F.C.
Alberto Cerezo		Gabriel Torres; Ruben Gamboa

Estadio Armando Dely Valdés

November 12, 2006

Atlético Veragüense	1-1	Tauro F.C.
Erick Quiroz		Alberto Skinner

Estadio Toco Castillo

==== Semifinals 2nd leg ====
November 17, 2006

San Francisco F.C.	1-3 (a.e.t.)	Arabe Unido
Carlos Rivera		Edgar Tem; Jair Medina; Roberto Goodman

Estadio Agustín Sánchez

November 17, 2006

Tauro F.C.	2-0	Atlético Veragüense
Hector Nazarith; Rolando Escobar

Estadio Giancarlo Gronchi de Pedregal

==== Final ====
November 25, 2006

Tauro F.C.	2-0	Arabe Unido
Hector Nazarith; Rolando Escobar

Estadio Rommel Fernández

Clausura 2006 champion

== Grand Final ==
Club	Champion
San Francisco F.C.	ANAPROF 2006 Apertura Champion
Tauro F.C.	ANAPROF 2006 Clausura Champion

=== Final ===
December 3, 2006

Tauro F.C.	0-1	San Francisco F.C.
		Alberto Zapata

Estadio Rommel Fernández

ANAPROF 2006 champion

3rd title

== Relegation table ==
Pos	Team	Pld	W	D	L	GF	GA	GD	Pts	Relegation
1	Tauro F.C.	36	20	12	4	56	31	+25	72	
2	San Francisco F.C.	36	18	10	8	60	36	+24	64	
3	Plaza Amador	36	18	8	10	55	35	+20	62	
4	Atlético Veragüense	36	15	12	9	47	42	+5	57	
5	Arabe Unido	36	13	13	10	45	38	+7	52	
6	Alianza F.C.	36	15	5	16	51	53	−2	50	
7	Municipal Chorrillo	36	11	15	10	44	40	+4	48	
8	Sporting '89	36	12	7	17	36	44	−8	43	
9	Atlético Chiriquí	36	6	10	20	32	59	−27	28	
10	Policia Nacional	36	3	6	27	27	74	−47	15	Relegation to Liga Nacional de Ascenso

== Local derby statistics ==
El Super Clasico Nacional - Tauro v Plaza Amador

March 15, 2006

Plaza Amador	1–2	Tauro
Luis Tejada		Rolando Escobar; Edwin Aguilar

Rommel Fernández

September 27, 2006

Tauro	0–0	Plaza Amador

Giancarlo Gronchi

Clasico del Pueblo - Plaza Amador v Chorillo

February 3, 2006

Plaza Amador	1–1	Municipal Chorrillo
Jonathan Branwell		Juan Carlos Cubilla

Rommel Fernández

July 29, 2006

Municipal Chorrillo	0–0	Plaza Amador

Balboa

Derbi Interiorano - Atlético Chiriquí v Atlético Veragüense

March 15, 2006

Atlético Chiriquí	0–2	Atlético Veragüense
		Cristian Vega; Yonath Solano

San Cristobal

September 27, 2006

Atlético Veragüense	1–1	Atlético Chiriquí

Omar Torrijos
