= 2007 ANAPROF Clausura =

ANAPROF
- Season: Clausura 2007
- Champions: San Francisco FC
- Relegated: -
- -: -

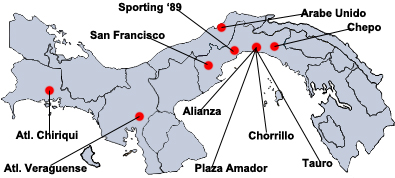
ANAPROF 2007 Clausura team distribution

The ANAPROF Clausura 2007 season (officially "Torneo Clausura 2007") started on August 3, 2007. On December 2, 2007, the Clausura 2007 finished with San Francisco F.C. crowned four-time ANAPROF champion after beating Arabe Unido on penalties. Therefore, both San Francisco F.C. and Arabe Unido participated in the Copa Interclubes UNCAF 2008.

== Changes for Clausura 2007 ==
- Since only seven clubs inscribed for the Primera A (while eight are required by the regulations), the second level is not played and there will be no promotion or relegation at the end of the 2007 season.

== Teams ==
Club	City	Stadium
Alianza F.C.	Panama City	Estadio Camping Resort
CD Árabe Unido	Colon	Estadio Armando Dely Valdés
Atlético Chiriquí	David	Estadio San Cristóbal
Atlético Veragüense	Santiago	Estadio Toco Castillo
Chepo F.C.	Chepo	Estadio Bernardo Gil
Municipal Chorrillo	Panama City	Estadio Municipal de Balboa
Plaza Amador	Panama City	Estadio Javier Cruz
San Francisco F.C.	La Chorrera	Estadio Agustín Sánchez
Sporting San Miguelito	San Miguelito	Estadio Bernardo Gil
Tauro F.C.	Panama City	Estadio Giancarlo Gronchi de Pedregal

== Standings ==
Pos	Team	Pld	W	D	L	GF	GA	GD	Pts	Qualification
1	San Francisco F.C.	18	11	4	3	27	16	+11	37	Semifinal
2	Arabe Unido	18	9	5	4	42	27	+15	32	Semifinal
3	Tauro F.C.	18	8	7	3	38	23	+15	31	Semifinal
4	Municipal Chorrillo	18	8	3	7	24	21	+3	27	Semifinal
5	Atlético Chiriquí	18	6	8	4	21	20	+1	26	
6	Alianza F.C.	18	7	3	8	19	20	−1	24	
7	Chepo F.C.	18	6	5	7	23	21	+2	23	
8	Sporting San Miguelito	18	4	6	8	19	24	−5	18	
9	Plaza Amador	18	4	5	9	24	30	−6	17	
10	Atlético Veragüense	18	3	2	13	10	43	−33	11	

Source: Asociación Deportiva América http://www.americafc.tk

== Results table ==
Home \ Away	ALI	ARA	ACH	AVE	CHE	CHO	PLA	SAN	SPO	TAU
Alianza	—	1–2	1–1	0–1	1–3	2–0	2–1	1–0	1–0	1–1
Arabe Unido	0–1	—	6–3	4–0	3–2	1–2	4–1	2–3	3–2	1–2
Atl. Chiriquí	1–0	2–2	—	0–0	1–0	4–2	2–0	0–1	1–0	2–2
Veragüense	2–1	0–2	0–1	—	0–4	0–0	0–3	0–2	0–0	0–4
Chepo	0–1	1–1	0–0	2–0	—	0–1	1–0	0–3	1–1	3–1
Chorrillo	1–0	1–1	4–0	5–2	1–2	—	0–1	2–0	1–3	0–1
Plaza Amador	1–2	3–3	1–1	3–1	0–0	2–2	—	0–0	3–4	3–1
San Francisco	2–1	1–3	1–0	3–2	2–0	2–0	3–2	—	1–0	0–0
Sporting	1–1	1–2	1–1	0–2	3–2	0–1	1–0	0–0	—	1–1
Tauro	3–2	2–2	1–1	7–0	3–2	0–1	3–0	3–3	3–1	—

Legend: Blue = home team win; Yellow = draw; Red = away team win.

== Final round ==
Semifinals (agg)
San Francisco F.C.	1
Municipal Chorrillo	1
Arabe Unido	1
Tauro F.C.	0

Final
San Francisco F.C.	0
Arabe Unido	0

=== Semifinals 1st Leg (Semifinales - Juego de ida) ===
November 18, 2007

Municipal Chorrillo	0-1	San Francisco F.C.
		Antonio Ortega

Estadio Balboa

November 18, 2007

Tauro F.C.	0-1	Árabe Unido
		Manuel Mosquera

Estadio Giancarlo Gronchi de Pedregal

=== Semifinals 2nd Leg (Semifinales - Juego de vuelta) ===
November 23, 2007

San Francisco F.C.	0-1	Municipal Chorrillo
		Julio Medina III
Penalties
Jose Julio (penalty missed); Eduardo Jiménez (penalty scored); José Justavino (penalty scored); Santiago de Alba (penalty scored); Alberto Blanco (penalty scored); Jair Carrasquilla (penalty missed); Victor Suarez (penalty scored)	4-3	Marcos Villareal (penalty missed); Roberto Stewart (penalty missed); Jean Carlo Cedeño (penalty scored); Johnny Ruiz (penalty scored); Alberto Quintero Medina (penalty scored); Cristian Vergara (penalty missed); Leonel Parrish (penalty missed)

Estadio Agustín Sánchez

San Francisco advances to final 4–3 on penalties

November 25, 2007

Árabe Unido	0-0	Tauro F.C.

Estadio Armando Dely Valdés

=== Final ===
December 2, 2007

San Francisco F.C.	0-0	Arabe Unido
Penalties
Jose Julio (penalty scored); Eduardo Jiménez (penalty scored); Juan Ramón Solís (penalty missed); Santiago de Alba (penalty scored); Alberto Blanco (penalty scored)	4-2	Eduardo McTaggart (penalty scored); Ricardo Lozano (penalty missed); Nelson Barahona (penalty scored); Nahil Caroll (penalty missed)

Estadio Rod Carew

Clausura 2007 champion

4th title

San Francisco qualified for 2008–09 CONCACAF Champions League.

== Top goalscorers ==
Position	Player	Scored for	Goals
1	(Panama) Gabriel Torres	Chepo	9
-	(Panama) Orlando Rodríguez	Arabe Unido	9
3	(Panama) César Medina	Alianza	8
-	(Panama) Manuel Mosquera	Arabe Unido	8
-	(Colombia) Luis Escobar	Tauro	8
6	(Panama) Anthony Basil	Sporting San Miguelito	7
7	(Panama) Engie Mitre	Plaza Amador	6
-	(Panama) Alberto Cerezo	Arabe Unido	6
9	(Panama) Eduardo Jiménez	San Francisco	5
-	(Panama) Carlos Rivera	Tauro	5

== Goalscorers by team ==
Club	Club goals	Goals	Nat.	Player
Alianza F.C.	19	8	(Panama)	Cesar Medina
Alianza F.C.	19	2	(Panama)	Abdul Pinto
Alianza F.C.	19	2	(Panama)	Ricardo Palomino
Alianza F.C.	19	2	(Panama)	Ivan Lopez
Alianza F.C.	19	1	(Panama)	Fernando Hurtado
Alianza F.C.	19	1	(Panama)	Neftali Diaz
Alianza F.C.	19	1	(Panama)	Amaral Peralta
Alianza F.C.	19	1	(Panama)	Alexis Antaneda
Alianza F.C.	19	1	(Panama)	Oldemar Caceres
Arabe Unido	43	9	(Panama)	Orlando Rodríguez
Arabe Unido	43	8	(Panama)	Manuel Mosquera
Arabe Unido	43	6	(Panama)	Alberto Cerezo
Arabe Unido	43	5	(Panama)	Publio Rodriguez
Arabe Unido	43	4	(Panama)	Eduardo McTaggart
Arabe Unido	43	3	(Panama)	Jair Miranda
Arabe Unido	43	3	(Panama)	Armando Cooper
Arabe Unido	43	2	(Panama)	Renald Addles
Arabe Unido	43	2	(Panama)	Omar Camargo
Arabe Unido	43	1	(Panama)	Amílcar Henríquez
Arabe Unido	43	1	(Panama)	Jacinto Acosta (OG)
Atlético Chiriquí	21	5	(Panama)	Catalino Smith
Atlético Chiriquí	21	4	(Panama)	Oscar Vargas
Atlético Chiriquí	21	2	(Panama)	Benjamin Ortega
Atlético Chiriquí	21	2	(Colombia)	Pablo Bedoya
Atlético Chiriquí	21	2	(Panama)	Omar Navarro
Atlético Chiriquí	21	2	(Panama)	Anthony Valdes
Atlético Chiriquí	21	2	(Colombia)	Rodman Gonzalez
Atlético Chiriquí	21	1	(Panama)	Carlos Valdes
Atlético Chiriquí	21	1	(Panama)	Clive Trottman
Atlético Veragüense	10	5	(Panama)	Mario Cox
Atlético Veragüense	10	2	(Panama)	Enzo Salas
Atlético Veragüense	10	1	(Panama)	Josue Brown
Atlético Veragüense	10	1	(Panama)	Miguel Gonzalez
Atlético Veragüense	10	1	(Panama)	Kevin Lusben
Chepo F.C.	23	9	(Panama)	Gabriel Torres
Chepo F.C.	23	4	(Panama)	Javier de la Rosa
Chepo F.C.	23	3	(Panama)	Delano Welch
Chepo F.C.	23	2	(Panama)	Carlos Martinez
Chepo F.C.	23	1	(Panama)	Celso Polo
Chepo F.C.	23	1	(Panama)	Juan Degracia
Chepo F.C.	23	1	(Panama)	Alberto Quesada
Chepo F.C.	23	1	(Panama)	Armando Gun
Chepo F.C.	23	1	(Panama)	Carlos Rodriguez
Municipal Chorrillo	25	4	(Panama)	Ricardo Phillips
Municipal Chorrillo	25	3	(Panama)	Johnny Ruiz
Municipal Chorrillo	25	2	(Panama)	Raul Moreno
Municipal Chorrillo	25	2	(Panama)	Alberto Quintero
Municipal Chorrillo	25	2	(Panama)	Alejandro Dawson
Municipal Chorrillo	25	2	(Panama)	Jair Medina
Municipal Chorrillo	25	2	(Panama)	Jean Carlo Cedeño
Municipal Chorrillo	25	2	(Panama)	Julio Medina III
Municipal Chorrillo	25	1	(Panama)	Marco Villareal
Municipal Chorrillo	25	1	(Panama)	Miguel Castillo
Municipal Chorrillo	25	1	(Panama)	Edison Romero (OG)
Municipal Chorrillo	25	1	(Panama)	Manuel Bonilla
Municipal Chorrillo	25	1	(Panama)	Leonel Parrish
Municipal Chorrillo	25	1	(Panama)	Roberto Stewart
Plaza Amador	24	6	(Panama)	Engie Mitre
Plaza Amador	24	3	(Panama)	Alcibiades Rojas
Plaza Amador	24	2	(Panama)	Derek James
Plaza Amador	24	2	(Panama)	Alexis King
Plaza Amador	24	2	(Panama)	Dionisio Olivardia
Plaza Amador	24	2	(Panama)	Ricardo Buitrago
Plaza Amador	24	2	(Panama)	Luis Olivardia
Plaza Amador	24	1	(Panama)	Joel Jimenez
Plaza Amador	24	1	(Panama)	Alfredo Hernandez
Plaza Amador	24	1	(Panama)	Jean Estrebi
Plaza Amador	24	1	(Panama)	Cesar Blackman
Plaza Amador	24	1	(Panama)	Luis de Leon
San Francisco F.C.	28	5	(Panama)	Eduardo Jiménez
San Francisco F.C.	28	4	(Colombia)	Jose Julio
San Francisco F.C.	28	3	(Panama)	Temístocles Pérez
San Francisco F.C.	28	3	(Panama)	Marco Aparicio
San Francisco F.C.	28	3	(Panama)	Antonio Ortega
San Francisco F.C.	28	2	(Panama)	Angel Lombardo
San Francisco F.C.	28	2	(Panama)	Juan Ramón Solís
San Francisco F.C.	28	2	(Colombia)	Leonard Cardales
San Francisco F.C.	28	1	(Panama)	Wess Torres
San Francisco F.C.	28	1	(Colombia)	William Negrete
San Francisco F.C.	28	1	(Panama)	Edison Romero (OG)
San Francisco F.C.	28	1	(Panama)	Miguel Olivares
Sporting San Miguelito	19	7	(Panama)	Anthony Basil
Sporting San Miguelito	19	3	(Panama)	Luis Rodriguez
Sporting San Miguelito	19	2	(Panama)	Multron Charles
Sporting San Miguelito	19	1	(Panama)	Franco Davis
Sporting San Miguelito	19	1	(Panama)	Agustin Salinas
Sporting San Miguelito	19	1	(Panama)	Oswaldo Solanilla
Sporting San Miguelito	19	1	(Panama)	Luis Ovallez
Sporting San Miguelito	19	1	(Panama)	Eladio Mitre
Sporting San Miguelito	19	1	(Panama)	Luis Morales
Sporting San Miguelito	19	1	(Panama)	Abel Zamorano
Tauro F.C.	38	8	(Colombia)	Luis Escobar
Tauro F.C.	38	5	(Panama)	Alberto Skinner
Tauro F.C.	38	5	(Panama)	Carlos Rivera
Tauro F.C.	38	4	(Panama)	Luis Tejada
Tauro F.C.	38	4	(Argentina)	Pablo Romero
Tauro F.C.	38	2	(Panama)	Juan Carlos Cubilla
Tauro F.C.	38	2	(Panama)	Brunnet Hay
Tauro F.C.	38	1	(Panama)	Reggie Arosemena
Tauro F.C.	38	1	(Colombia)	Johan Melo
Tauro F.C.	38	1	(Colombia)	Dorian Lopez
Tauro F.C.	38	1	(Panama)	Eric Quiroz
Tauro F.C.	38	1	(Panama)	Ardely Arango
Tauro F.C.	38	1	(Panama)	Juan de Dios Perez
Tauro F.C.	38	1	(Panama)	Rolando Palma

== Local derby statistics ==
El Super Clasico Nacional - Tauro v Plaza Amador

August 4, 2007

Plaza Amador	3–1	Tauro
Alexis King; Luis Olivardia; Derek James		Luis Escobar

Rommel Fernández

September 26, 2007

Tauro	3–0	Plaza Amador
Alberto Skinner (3)

Giancarlo Gronchi

Clasico del Pueblo - Plaza Amador v Chorillo

September 1, 2007

Municipal Chorrillo	0–1	Plaza Amador
		Alfredo Hernandez

Balboa

November 10, 2007

Plaza Amador	2–2	Municipal Chorrillo
Alcibiades Rojas (2)		Roberto Stewart; Jean Carlo Cedeño

Artes y Oficios

Derbi Interiorano - Atlético Chiriquí v Atlético Veragüense

August 25, 2007

Atlético Veragüense	0–1	Atlético Chiriquí
		Catalino Smith

Toco Castillo

October 13, 2007

Atlético Chiriquí	1–0	Atlético Veragüense
Anthony Valdes

San Cristobal
