= 2008 ANAPROF Clausura =

ANAPROF
- Season: Clausura 2008
- Champions: -
- Relegated: -
- -: -

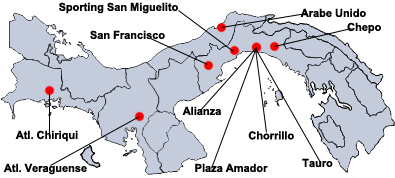
ANAPROF 2008 Clausura team distribution

The ANAPROF Clausura 2008 season (officially "Torneo Clausura 2008") started on July 25, 2008. On November 30, 2008, the Clausura 2008 finalized with Árabe Unido crowned four time ANAPROF champion after beating Tauro F.C. 3–2 after extra time. Therefore Árabe Unido will participate in the 2009–10 CONCACAF Champions League. Plaza Amador remained in the ANAPROF after beating Primera A 2008 champion Río Abajo F.C. with a 3-2 aggregate score. Therefore, no team was relegated from ANAPROF for the second consecutive year.

== Teams ==
Club	City	Stadium
Alianza F.C.	Panama City	Estadio Camping Resort
Árabe Unido	Colon	Estadio Armando Dely Valdés
Atlético Chiriquí	David	Estadio Glorias Deportivas Barüenses
Atlético Veragüense	Santiago	Estadio Virgilio Tejeira; Complejo Deportivo Carlos Jiménez*
Chepo F.C.	Chepo	Estadio Bernardo Gil
Chorrillo F.C.	Panama City	Estadio Municipal de Balboa
Plaza Amador	Panama City	Estadio Bernardo Gil
San Francisco F.C.	La Chorrera	Estadio Virgilio Tejeira
Sporting San Miguelito	San Miguelito	Estadio Bernardo Gil
Tauro F.C.	Panama City	Campo de Deportes Giancarlo Gronchi

- [*] From round 11

== Standings ==
Pos	Team	Pld	W	D	L	GF	GA	GD	Pts	Qualification
1	Árabe Unido	18	11	4	3	39	17	+22	37	Semifinal
2	Tauro	18	9	6	3	33	23	+10	33	Semifinal
3	San Francisco	18	9	4	5	35	27	+8	31	Semifinal
4	Chepo	18	8	5	5	31	19	+12	29	Semifinal
5	Atlético Veragüense	18	7	6	5	25	21	+4	27	
6	Sporting San Miguelito	18	5	8	5	26	24	+2	23	
7	Alianza	18	6	3	9	20	24	−4	21	
8	Atlético Chiriquí	18	5	4	9	19	42	−23	19	
9	Chorrillo	18	4	6	8	18	26	−8	18	
10	Plaza Amador	18	2	2	14	9	31	−22	8	

== Results table ==
Home \ Away	ALI	ÁRA	ACH	AVE	CHE	CHO	PLA	SAN	SPO	TAU
Alianza	—	1–3	1–2	2–2	0–1	1–0	3–0	1–4	3–1	2–0
Árabe Unido	2–1	—	7–0	4–1	0–1	1–1	5–1	3–0	1–1	3–1
Atl. Chiríqui	0–2	1–3	—	2–1	1–1	2–2	1–0	1–2	1–2	1–1
Atl. Veragüense	1–0	3–0	3–0	—	1–0	1–3	3–0	1–0	1–1	2–3
Chepo	1–1	1–2	4–0	1–2	—	2–0	3–0	1–1	2–0	4–1
Chorrillo	0–0	1–2	1–1	1–1	3–2	—	1–0	2–3	1–5	0–2
Plaza Amador	3–0	0–2	0–1	0–0	2–1	0–1	—	0–2	0–3	0–1
San Francisco	1–2	0–0	5–1	3–1	3–3	1–0	2–1	—	1–1	3–4
Sporting	2–0	1–1	2–4	0–0	1–2	2–1	0–0	1–3	—	2–2
Tauro	1–0	2–0	5–0	1–1	1–1	0–0	3–2	4–1	1–1	—

Legend: Blue = home team win; Yellow = draw; Red = away team win.

== Final round ==
Semifinals (agg)
Árabe Unido	7
Chepo	5
Tauro	1
San Francisco	1

Final
Árabe Unido	3
Tauro	2

=== Semifinals 1st leg ===
November 16, 2008

Chepo	5-4	Árabe Unido
Luis Jaramillo 31' 68' 90'; Ismael Menal 77'; Armando Gun 89'		Omar Camargo 1'; Manuel Mosquera 23'; Nelson Barahona 33'; Orlando Rodríguez 46'

Estadio Bernardo Gil

November 16, 2008

San Francisco	0-1	Tauro
		Luis Escobar 22'

Estadio Virgilio Tejeira

=== Semifinals 2nd leg ===
November 22, 2008

Árabe Unido	3-0	Chepo
Victor Rene Mendieta Jr. 8'; Jose Justavino 60'; Orlando Rodríguez 88'

Estadio Armando Dely Valdés

November 23, 2008

Tauro	0-1	San Francisco
		Alberto Zapata 61'
Penalties
Edwin Aguilar (penalty scored); Luis Moreno (penalty scored); Gustavo Avila (penalty scored); Anel Canales (penalty scored)	4-2	(penalty missed) Alberto Zapata; (penalty missed) Eduardo Jiménez; (penalty scored) Temistocles Perez; (penalty scored) Santiago de Alba

Campo de Deportes Giancarlo Gronchi

Tauro advances to final 4–2 on penalties

=== Final ===
November 30, 2008

Árabe Unido	3-2	Tauro F.C.
Orlando Rodríguez 30' 66'; Victor Rene Mendieta Jr. 111'		Rolando Palma 5'; Edwin Aguilar 71'

Estadio Virgilio Tejeira

Clausura 2008 champion
Árabe Unido
4th title

Árabe Unido qualified for 2009–10 CONCACAF Champions League.

== Top goalscorers ==
Position	Player	Scored for	Goals
1	(Panama) Orlando Rodríguez	Árabe Unido	18
2	(Panama) Luis Jaramillo	Chepo	14
3	(Panama) Alberto Zapata	San Francisco	13
4	(Panama) Manuel Mosquera	Árabe Unido	11
-	(Panama) Brunet Hay	Tauro	11
6	(Panama) Edwin Aguilar	Tauro	8
7	(Panama) Ismael Menal	Chepo	7
-	(Panama) Cesar Medina	Alianza	7
9	(Colombia) Luis Escobar	Tauro	6
-	(Panama) Eybir Bonaga	Chiriquí	6

== Goalscorers by team ==
Club	Club goals	Goals	Nat.	Player
Alianza	20	7	(Panama)	César Medina
Alianza	20	4	(Panama)	Alberto Skinner
Alianza	20	2	(Panama)	Jair Carrasquilla
Alianza	20	2	(Panama)	Francisco Lopez
Alianza	20	1	(Panama)	Jostick McCormack
Alianza	20	1	(Panama)	Edwin Oropeza
Alianza	20	1	(Panama)	Javier Navas
Alianza	20	1	(Panama)	Gilmar Torres
Alianza	20	1	(Panama)	Yishak González De León
Árabe Unido	49	18	(Panama)	Orlando Rodríguez
Árabe Unido	49	11	(Panama)	Manuel Mosquera
Árabe Unido	49	5	(Panama)	Victor Rene Mendieta Jr.
Árabe Unido	49	3	(Panama)	Eduardo McTaggart
Árabe Unido	49	2	(Panama)	Nelson Barahona
Árabe Unido	49	2	(Panama)	Amílcar Henríquez
Árabe Unido	49	2	(Panama)	Publio Rodriguez
Árabe Unido	49	1	(Panama)	Richard Dixon
Árabe Unido	49	1	(Panama)	William Aguilar
Árabe Unido	49	1	(Panama)	Andres Santamaria
Árabe Unido	49	1	(Panama)	Armando Cooper
Árabe Unido	49	1	(Panama)	Omar Camargo
Árabe Unido	49	1	(Panama)	Jose Justavino
Atlético Chiriquí	19	6	(Panama)	Eybir Bonaga
Atlético Chiriquí	19	4	(Panama)	Anthony Valdes
Atlético Chiriquí	19	3	(Panama)	Clive Trottman
Atlético Chiriquí	19	3	(Panama)	Auriel Gallardo
Atlético Chiriquí	19	1	(Panama)	Mario Mendez
Atlético Chiriquí	19	1	(Colombia)	Luis Rolando Mendoza
Atlético Chiriquí	19	1	(Panama)	Gabriel Ávila
Atlético Veragüense	25	6	(Panama)	Jair Medina
Atlético Veragüense	25	6	(Colombia)	John Mosquera
Atlético Veragüense	25	5	(Panama)	Oscar Vargas
Atlético Veragüense	25	3	(Panama)	Catalino Smith
Atlético Veragüense	25	2	(Panama)	Cesar Blackman
Atlético Veragüense	25	1	(Panama)	Marco Aparicio
Atlético Veragüense	25	1	(Panama)	Jairo Pineda
Atlético Veragüense	25	1	(Colombia)	Rodman Gonzalez
Chepo	36	14	(Panama)	Luis Jaramillo
Chepo	36	7	(Panama)	Ismael Menal
Chepo	36	4	(Panama)	Delano Welch
Chepo	36	4	(Panama)	José Luis González
Chepo	36	3	(Panama)	Cesar Aguilar
Chepo	36	1	(Panama)	Carlos Rodríguez
Chepo	36	1	(Panama)	José Calderon
Chepo	36	1	(Panama)	Gerardo Barrios
Chepo	36	1	(Panama)	Carlos Martinez
Chepo	36	1	(Panama)	Armando Gun
Chorrillo	18	6	(Panama)	Johnny Ruiz
Chorrillo	18	3	(Panama)	Julio Medina III
Chorrillo	18	2	(Panama)	Bernardo Palma
Chorrillo	18	1	(Panama)	Alfredo Phillips
Chorrillo	18	1	(Panama)	Jaime Caby
Chorrillo	18	1	(Panama)	Roderick Brown
Chorrillo	18	1	(Panama)	Samuel Stewart
Chorrillo	18	1	(Panama)	Gilberto Walter
Chorrillo	18	1	(Panama)	Luis Morales
Chorrillo	18	1	(Colombia)	Jose Julio
Plaza Amador	12	2	(Panama)	Engie Mitre
Plaza Amador	12	2	(Panama)	Julio Ruiz
Plaza Amador	12	2	(Panama)	Enrico Small
Plaza Amador	12	2	(Panama)	Luis Olivardia
Plaza Amador	12	1	(Panama)	Luis de Leon
Plaza Amador	12	1	(Panama)	Luis Palacios
Plaza Amador	12	1	(Brazil)	Felipe Borowski
Plaza Amador	12	1	(Panama)	Nestor Murillo
San Francisco	36	13	(Panama)	Alberto Zapata
San Francisco	36	4	(Panama)	Eduardo Jiménez
San Francisco	36	3	(Panama)	Angel Lombardo
San Francisco	36	3	(Panama)	Alberto Blanco
San Francisco	36	3	(Panama)	Temìstocles Pèrez
San Francisco	36	2	(Panama)	Manuel Torres
San Francisco	36	2	(Panama)	Juan Ramón Solís
San Francisco	36	2	(Argentina)	Victor Suarez
San Francisco	36	2	(Panama)	Boris Alfaro
San Francisco	36	1	(Argentina)	Pablo Romero
San Francisco	36	1	(Panama)	Marco Aparicio (OG)
Sporting San Miguelito	26	4	(Panama)	Luis Mendoza
Sporting San Miguelito	26	3	(Panama)	Miguel Vásquez
Sporting San Miguelito	26	3	(Panama)	Esteban Jaén
Sporting San Miguelito	26	3	(Panama)	Anthony Basile
Sporting San Miguelito	26	3	(Panama)	Luis Angel Rodriguez
Sporting San Miguelito	26	2	(Panama)	Luis Ovalles
Sporting San Miguelito	26	2	(Panama)	Charles Multon
Sporting San Miguelito	26	2	(Panama)	Ricardo Phillips
Sporting San Miguelito	26	1	(Panama)	Alejandro Dawson
Sporting San Miguelito	26	1	(Panama)	Yairo Yao
Sporting San Miguelito	26	1	(Panama)	Jair Miranda
Sporting San Miguelito	26	1	(Panama)	Chaimir Toloy
Tauro	36	11	(Panama)	Brunet Hay
Tauro	36	8	(Panama)	Edwin Aguilar
Tauro	36	6	(Colombia)	Luis Escobar
Tauro	36	3	(Panama)	Gabriel Ríos
Tauro	36	3	(Panama)	Anel Canales
Tauro	36	2	(Panama)	Rolando Blackburn
Tauro	36	1	(Panama)	Gustavo Avila
Tauro	36	1	(Panama)	Josue Brown
Tauro	36	1	(Panama)	Rolando Palma

== Relegation table ==
Pos	Team	Pld	W	D	L	GF	GA	GD	Pts	Qualification
1	Árabe Unido	31	17	6	8	54	31	+23	57	
2	Tauro	31	16	8	7	54	41	+13	56	
3	San Francisco	31	14	11	6	54	42	+12	53	
4	Chepo	31	13	10	8	50	31	+19	49	
5	Sporting San Miguelito	31	11	10	10	44	40	+4	43	
6	Atlético Veragüense	31	9	11	11	40	48	−8	38	
7	Chorrillo	31	7	13	11	32	39	−7	34	
8	Atlético Chiriquí	31	9	7	15	33	64	−31	34	
9	Alianza	31	9	4	18	45	51	−6	31	
10	Plaza Amador	31	6	8	17	22	41	−19	26	Relegation playoff

=== Relegation playoff ===
Team 1	Agg.	Team 2	1st leg	2nd leg
Plaza Amador	3-2	Río Abajo F.C.	2-2	1-0

Plaza Amador remain in ANAPROF

==== 1st leg ====
November 21, 2008

Plaza Amador	2–2	Río Abajo F.C.
Luis Olivardia 24' 37'		Hector de la Cruz 8'; Aramis Haywood 83'

Estadio Bernardo Gil

==== 2nd leg ====
December 6, 2008

Río Abajo F.C.	0–1	Plaza Amador
		Nestor Murillo 56'

Estadio Balboa

== Local derby statistics ==
El Super Clasico Nacional - Tauro v Plaza Amador

October 16, 2008

Tauro F.C.	3–2	Plaza Amador
Anel Canales 14'; Brunet Hay 27'; Gabriel Ríos 90'		Julio Ruiz 34' 45'

Giancarlo Gronchi

October 31, 2008

Plaza Amador	0–1	Tauro F.C.
		Edwin Aguilar 75'

Bernardo Gil

Clasico del Pueblo - Plaza Amador v Chorillo

July 26, 2008

Chorrillo F.C.	1–0	Plaza Amador
Alfredo Phillips 47'

Balboa

September 19, 2008

Plaza Amador	0–1	Chorrillo F.C.
		Julio Medina III 72'

Bernardo Gil

Clasico Interiorano - Atlético Chiriquí v Atlético Veragüense

September 17, 2008

Atlético Chiriquí	2–1	Atlético Veragüense
Clive Trottman 28'; Auriel Gallardo 47'		Oscar Vargas 4'

Glorias Barüenses

November 1, 2008

Atlético Veragüense	3–0	Atlético Chiriquí
John Mosquera 11'; Jair Medina 27'; Cesar Blackman 52'

Carlos Jiménez
