= 2010–11 Liga Panameña de Fútbol season =

Liga Panameña de Fútbol
- Season: 2010–11
- Champions: Clausura '10: Árabe Unido
- Champions League: Árabe Unido; Tauro; San Francisco

The 2010–11 Liga Panameña de Fútbol season was the 23rd season of top-flight football in Panama. Because of a restructuring of the calendar of the season, this season contained three tournaments to bring the season to a fall-spring season (similar to the majority of leagues in Europe). The season began on January 15, 2010, and was scheduled to end in May 2011. Ten teams were scheduled to compete throughout the entire season.

== Teams ==
Locations of the 2010–11 LPF teams

Club	Home city	Stadium
Alianza	Panama City	Cancha Sintetica Rommel Fernández
Árabe Unido	Colón	Estadio Armando Dely Valdés
Atlético Chiriquí	David	Estadio San Cristóbal
Atlético Veragüense	Santiago	Estadio Áristocles Castillo
Chepo	Chepo	Cancha Sintetica Rommel Fernández (in Panama City)
Chorrillo	Panama City	Estadio Javier Cruz
Plaza Amador	Panama City	Estadio Javier Cruz
San Francisco	La Chorrera	Estadio Agustín Sánchez
Sporting San Miguelito	San Miguelito	Cancha Sintetica Rommel Fernández (in Panama City)
Tauro	Panama City	Cancha Sintetica Rommel Fernández

=== Managerial changes ===
Team	Outgoing manager	Manner of departure	Date of vacancy	Position in table	Replaced by	Date of appointment	Position in table
2010 Clausura Pre-season changes
Sporting San Miguelito	(Panama) Carlos Walcott ^{(interim)}	End of caretaker spell	23 November 2009	6th (2009 II)	(Spain) Fernando Garcia Ramos	23 November 2009	N/A
Chepo	(Panama) Felipe Fuentes	Resigned	23 November 2009	8th (2009 II)	(Panama) Victor Rene Mendieta	23 November 2009	N/A
Alianza	(Costa Rica) Leroy Foster		28 December 2009	10th (2009 II)	(Costa Rica) Carlos Perez Porras	28 December 2009	N/A
2010 Clausura changes
Plaza Amador	(Panama) Leopoldo Lee	Resigned	19 January 2010	9th	(Italy) Marcos Casagrande ^{(interim)}	19 January 2010	9th
Plaza Amador	(Italy) Marcos Casagrande ^{(interim)}	End of caretaker spell	27 January 2010	9th	(Colombia) Jair Palacios	27 January 2010	9th
Tauro	(Colombia) Gonzalo Soto	Resigned	15 March 2010	10th	(Panama) Juan Carlos Cubillas	15 March 2010	10th
Sporting San Miguelito	(Spain) Fernando Garcia Ramos	Resigned	22 March 2010	8th	(Panama) Carlos Walcott ^{(interim)}	22 March 2010	8th
Sporting San Miguelito	(Panama) Carlos Walcott ^{(interim)}	End of caretaker spell	28 March 2010	6th	(Panama) Percival Piggott	22 March 2010	6th
Atlético Veragüense	(Costa Rica) Roger Gomez	Resigned	6 April 2010	9th	(Panama) Eduardo Flores ^{(interim)}	9 April 2010	9th
Chepo	(Panama) Victor Rene Mendieta	Resigned	19 April 2010	9th	(Panama) Cesar Morales ^{(interim)} (Panama) Frank Lozada ^{(interim)}	19 April 2010	9th
2010 Apertura Pre-season changes
Chepo	(Panama) Cesar Morales ^{(interim)} (Panama) Frank Lozada ^{(interim)}	End of caretaker spell	8 June 2010	9th (2010 A)	(United States) Michael Stump	8 June 2010	N/A
Atlético Veragüense	(Panama) Eduardo Flores ^{(interim)}	End of caretaker spell		10th (2010 A)	(Panama) Edison Romero		N/A

== 2010 Clausura ==
2010 Clausura
- Champions: Árabe Unido
- Champions League: Árabe Unido; Tauro; San Francisco
- Matches: 95
- Goals: 232 (2.44 per match)
- Top goalscorer: Johan de Ávila (10 goals)
- Biggest home win: San Francisco 7–1 Veragüense
- Biggest away win: Chepo 0–5 San Francisco
- Highest scoring: San Francisco 7–1 Veragüense
- Highest attendance: 20,125

The 2010 Clausura was the first tournament of the season. It began on January 25, 2010, and ended on May 14, 2010. The Árabe Unido were crowned the champion after defeating San Francisco 1–0 in the first professional football match played in the newly-remodeled Estadio Rommel Fernández. This was Arabe's 2nd title in a row and sixth in its history. After clinching this win, the Árabe Unido earned the Panama 1 spot in the 2010–11 CONCACAF Champions League and Tauro the Panama 2 spot as the runner-up with the most points in the 2009 Apertura II and 2010 Clausura season. San Francisco obtained the Panama 3 spot after the Belize Premier Football League champion failed to meet the CONCACAF stadium requirements, thus the vacated spot was awarded to Panama's runner-up with less points.

=== First round ===
==== Standings ====
Pos	Team	Pld	W	D	L	GF	GA	GD	Pts	Qualification
1	Atlético Chiriquí	18	10	3	5	28	21	+7	33	Qualified to the Final Round
2	Árabe Unido	18	8	7	3	24	18	+6	31	Qualified to the Final Round
3	Chorrillo	18	8	4	6	19	16	+3	28	Qualified to the Final Round
4	San Francisco	18	7	5	6	32	15	+17	26	Qualified to the Final Round
5	Alianza	18	7	5	6	22	18	+4	26	
6	Plaza Amador	18	5	7	6	23	21	+2	22	
7	Tauro	18	6	4	8	20	24	−4	22	
8	Sporting San Miguelito	18	5	6	7	19	20	−1	21	
9	Chepo	18	4	6	8	17	28	−11	18	
10	Atlético Veragüense	18	5	3	10	19	42	−23	18	

Updated to match(es) played on April 25, 2010. Source: RSSSF
Rules for classification: 1) points; 2) goal difference; 3) number of goals scored.

==== Results ====
Home \ Away	ALI	DÁU	CHI	AV	CHE	CHO	PA	SF	SSM	TAU
Alianza		1–1	0–2	3–1	1–2	1–0	1–1	1–0	2–0	4–1
Árabe Unido	2–0		2–1	1–2	0–0	1–0	1–0	1–1	1–1	1–0
Atlético Chiriquí	1–0	2–1		1–0	4–1	2–1	1–0	2–1	2–0	1–1
Atlético Veragüense	2–1	3–3	2–2		2–1	0–3	0–4	0–3	0–1	0–4
Chepo	1–0	0–0	5–2	0–3		0–1	2–3	0–5	1–1	1–0
Chorrillo	0–2	0–2	2–1	1–1	0–0		2–1	0–2	0–0	2–1
Plaza Amador	1–1	1–1	1–1	2–0	2–1	1–1		0–4	1–2	1–2
San Francisco	1–1	2–0	1–2	7–1	1–1	0–1	0–0		0–1	1–2
Sporting San Miguelito	2–3	2–3	2–1	4–0	1–1	1–2	1–1	0–1		0–1
Tauro	0–0	2–3	1–0	1–2	2–0	0–3	0–3	2–2	0–0	

Updated to match(es) played on April 25, 2010. Source: RSSSF
Legend: Blue = home team win; Yellow = draw; Red = away team win.

=== Final round ===
Semifinals (agg)
1	Atlético Chiriquí	2
4	San Francisco	3
2	Árabe Unido	2
3	Chorrillo	1

Final
4	San Francisco	0
2	Árabe Unido	1

==== Semifinals ====
Semifinal 1

April 30, 2010
21:00 (UTC-5)

San Francisco	1 – 0	Atlético Chiriquí
Zapata 42'	Report

Estadio Agustín Sánchez, La Chorrera
Referee: Rolando Vidal (Panama)

May 9, 2010
16:00 (UTC-5)

Atlético Chiriquí	2 – 2	San Francisco
Gallardo 48', 87'	Report	de Ávila 46'; White 81'

Estadio San Cristóbal, David
Referee: Roberto Moreno (Panama)

Semifinal 2

May 2, 2010
15:30 (UTC-5)

Chorrillo	1 – 0	Árabe Unido
Mitre 27'	Report

Estadio Javier Cruz, Panama City
Referee: Luis Rodríguez (Panama)

May 9, 2010
15:30 (UTC-5)

Árabe Unido	2 – 0 (a.e.t.)	Chorrillo
Mosquera 42'; Aguirre 105'	Report

Estadio Armando Dely Valdés, Colón
Referee: Rolando Vidal (Panama)

==== Final ====
May 14, 2010
20:30 (UTC-5)

San Francisco	0 – 1	Árabe Unido
	Report	Justavino 46'

Estadio Rommel Fernández, Panama City
Attendance: 20,125
Referee: Rolando Vidal (Panama)

2010 Clausura Champion:

6th title

=== Top goalscorers ===
Pos	Name	Club	Goals
1	(Colombia) Johan de Ávila	San Francisco	10
2	(Panama) Luis Rentería	Tauro	9
3	(Panama) Auriel Gallardo	Atlético Chiriquí	7
4	(Panama) Víctor René Mendieta, Jr.	Árabe Unido	6
4	(Panama) Johnny Ruíz	Chorrillo	6

== 2010 Apertura ==
2010 Apertura
- Champions: Tauro (8th title)
- Champions League: Tauro
- Matches: 95
- Goals: 214 (2.25 per match)
- Top goalscorer: Gabriel de Los Rios (8 goals)
- Biggest home win: Sporting San Miguelito 5-1 Atlético Chiriquí
- Biggest away win: Atlético Veragüense 0-3 Chepo; Chorrillo 0-3 Tauro
- Highest scoring: Plaza Amador 5-4 Chorrillo

The 2010 Apertura was the second tournament of the season and it began on 30 July 30, 2010 and ended on 17 December 2010.

=== First round ===
==== Standings ====
Pos	Team	Pld	W	D	L	GF	GA	GD	Pts	Qualification
1	Tauro	18	11	4	3	27	14	+13	37	Qualified to the Final Round
2	Árabe Unido	18	10	4	4	22	17	+5	34	Qualified to the Final Round
3	San Francisco	18	9	6	3	26	18	+8	33	Qualified to the Final Round
4	Chorrillo	18	7	6	5	23	20	+3	27	Qualified to the Final Round
5	Sporting San Miguelito	18	7	5	6	23	19	+4	26	
6	Plaza Amador	18	7	3	8	24	28	−4	24	
7	Alianza	18	6	5	7	21	18	+3	23	
8	Atlético Chiriquí	18	4	7	7	22	29	−7	19	
9	Chepo	18	4	2	12	12	21	−9	14	
10	Atlético Veragüense	18	3	2	13	13	29	−16	11	

Rules for classification: 1) points; 2) goal difference; 3) number of goals scored.

==== Results ====
Home \ Away	ALI	DÁU	CHI	AV	CHE	CHO	PA	SF	SSM	TAU
Alianza		2–0	2–1	1–1	1–0	0–0	1–1	1–2	2–3	1–2
Árabe Unido	2–1		1–1	2–1	1–0	1–0	2–1	1–0	0–1	1–1
Atlético Chiriquí	0–0	1–1		2–4	2–1	1–1	3–0	2–2	2–2	0–1
Atlético Veragüense	1–4	0–0	1–0		0–3	1–2	0–1	1–2	1–3	0–2
Chepo	0–2	1–2	0–1	2–1		0–1	0–0	2–0	1–1	1–0
Chorrillo	1–0	0–1	4–1	2–0	1–0		1–2	1–1	1–1	0–3
Plaza Amador	1–0	2–3	2–1	0–1	2–1	5–4		2–3	1–0	1–2
San Francisco	1–1	2–1	0–1	1–0	3–0	2–2	2–2		0–0	2–0
Sporting San Miguelito	1–2	0–2	5–1	1–0	1–0	0–1	2–1	0–1		2–3
Tauro	1–0	3–1	2–2	1–0	2–0	1–1	2–0	1–2	0–0	

Legend: Blue = home team win; Yellow = draw; Red = away team win.

=== Final round ===
Semifinals (agg)
1	Tauro	0 (4)
4	Chorrillo	0 (2)
2	Árabe Unido	0 (2)
3	San Francisco	0 (3)

Final
1	Tauro	1
3	San Francisco	0

==== Semifinals ====
Semifinal 1

3 December 2010
21:00 UTC−05:00

Chorrillo	0 – 0	Tauro
	Report

Estadio Rommel Fernández, Panama City
Referee: Rolando Vidal

12 December 2010
17:00 UTC−05:00

Tauro	0 – 0 (a.e.t.)	Chorrillo
	Report
Penalties
	4 – 2

Cancha Luis Ernesto Tapia, Panama City
Referee: Juan Amaya

Semifinal 2

3 December 2010
21:00 UTC−05:00

San Francisco	0 – 0	Árabe Unido
	Report

Estadio Agustín Sánchez, La Chorrera
Referee: Jafeth Perea

12 December 2010
15:00 UTC−05:00

Árabe Unido	0 – 0 (a.e.t.)	San Francisco
	Report
Penalties
	2 – 3

Estadio Armando Dely Valdés, Colón
Referee: Luis Rodríguez

==== Final ====
17 December 2010
21:00 UTC−05:00

San Francisco	0 – 1	Tauro
	Report	Sánchez 45'

Estadio Rommel Fernández, Panama City
Referee: Luis Rodríguez

2010 Apertura champion

8th title

=== Top goalscorers ===
Pos	Name	Club	Goals
1	(Panama) Gabriel de Los Rios	Atlético Chiriquí	8
2	(Panama) César Medina	Alianza	6
2	(Panama) Eduameth Nimbley Cárdenas	Alianza	6
2	(Panama) Alberto Zapata	Sporting San Miguelito	6
2	(Colombia) Julíán Martínez	Tauro	6
2	(Panama) Luis Rentería	Tauro	6

== 2011 Clausura ==
2011 Clausura
- Champions: San Francisco
- Champions League: San Francisco

The 2011 Clausura was the third and final tournament of the season. It began on 28 January 2011 and ended on 14 May 2011.

=== First round ===
==== Standings ====
Pos	Team	Pld	W	D	L	GF	GA	GD	Pts	Qualification
1	Chorrillo	18	8	7	3	16	9	+7	31	Qualified to the Final Round
2	San Francisco	18	7	8	3	31	21	+10	29	Qualified to the Final Round
3	Sporting San Miguelito	18	7	6	5	19	14	+5	27	Qualified to the Final Round
4	Tauro	18	7	5	6	25	21	+4	26	Qualified to the Final Round
5	Plaza Amador	18	6	8	4	18	17	+1	26	
6	Atlético Veragüense	18	7	4	7	17	17	0	25	
7	Atlético Chiriquí	18	6	6	6	19	20	−1	24	
8	Chepo	18	6	5	7	21	24	−3	23	
9	Árabe Unido	18	3	8	7	14	16	−2	17	
10	Alianza	18	3	3	12	12	33	−21	12	

Rules for classification: 1) points; 2) goal difference; 3) number of goals scored.

===== Positions by round =====
Team ╲ Round	1	2	3	4	5	6	7	8	9	10	11	12	13	14	15	16	17	18
Chorrillo	5	7	9	7	3	1	1	1	2	2	1	1	1	1	1	1	1	1
San Francisco	8	6	3	4	4	3	4	4	3	3	4	6	3	5	6	4	2	2
Sporting San Miguelito	4	1	1	1	2	2	6	6	4	7	5	3	4	3	3	6	3	3
Tauro	7	9	6	8	8	7	5	5	8	5	7	8	8	6	4	5	6	4
Plaza Amador	5	4	2	2	1	4	2	3	7	8	8	7	6	4	5	3	4	5
Atlético Veragüense	8	8	10	10	9	8	8	8	5	6	3	2	2	2	2	2	5	6
Atlético Chiriquí	1	2	5	3	5	5	7	9	6	4	6	4	5	7	7	7	7	7
Chepo	10	10	8	6	6	6	3	2	1	1	2	5	7	8	8	8	8	8
Árabe Unido	2	3	4	5	7	9	9	7	9	9	9	9	9	9	9	9	9	9
Alianza	2	5	7	9	10	10	10	10	10	10	10	10	10	10	10	10	10	10

==== Results ====
Home \ Away	ALI	DÁU	CHI	AV	CHE	CHO	PA	SF	SSM	TAU
Alianza		0–0	2–0	2–0	2–1	0–2	0–1	0–3	1–3	1–4
Árabe Unido	3–0		2–0	0–2	0–1	0–1	1–1	2–0	1–1	0–2
Atlético Chiriquí	2–0	0–0		1–1	2–1	0–0	3–2	2–2	0–0	2–1
Atlético Veragüense	1–1	0–0	3–1		0–2	0–1	0–0	2–1	1–0	2–1
Chepo	3–2	2–1	0–3	0–2		2–0	1–1	2–2	1–1	1–1
Chorrillo	0–0	1–0	1–0	1–0	2–0		0–0	1–2	0–0	2–0
Plaza Amador	1–0	1–1	0–1	0–2	0–1	2–2		2–1	1–0	2–1
San Francisco	3–0	2–2	1–1	2–0	1–0	1–1	2–2		2–0	2–0
Sporting San Miguelito	4–1	1–0	2–0	2–1	2–2	1–0	0–1	1–1		0–1
Tauro	2–0	1–1	2–1	2–0	2–1	1–1	1–1	3–3	0–1	

Legend: Blue = home team win; Yellow = draw; Red = away team win.

=== Final round ===
Semifinals (agg)
1	Chorrillo	5
4	Tauro	1
2	San Francisco	4
3	Sporting San Miguelito	2

Final
1	Chorrillo	2
2	San Francisco	3

==== Semifinals ====
Semifinal 1

29 April 2011
21:00 (UTC-5)

Sporting San Miguelito	1 – 2	San Francisco
Zapata 28'		83' Jimenez; 89' Miller

Estadio Rommel Fernández, Panama City

6 May 2011
21:00 (UTC-5)

San Francisco	2 – 1	Sporting San Miguelito
Brown 70', 84'		32' Herrera

Estadio Agustín Sánchez, La Chorrera

Semifinal 2

30 April 2011
20:00 (UTC-5)

Tauro	1 – 1	Chorrillo
Angulo 2'		21' Blackburn

Estadio Rommel Fernández, Panama City

7 May 2011
20:00 (UTC-5)

Chorrillo	4 – 0	Tauro
Mitre 28', 72' de la Rosa 53'; Phillips 85'

Estadio Rommel Fernández, Panama City

==== Final ====
14 May 2011
20:30 (UTC-5)

Chorrillo	2 – 3 (a.e.t.)	San Francisco
Rojas 21'; Mitre 42'		10' De Avila; 83' (pen.), 91' Brown

Estadio Rommel Fernández, Panama City
Referee: Roberto Moreno

2011 Clausura Champion:

7th title

=== Top goalscorers ===
Pos	Name	Club	Goals

== Aggregate table ==
Pos	Team	Pld	W	D	L	GF	GA	GD	Pts	Qualification or relegation
1	San Francisco	54	23	19	12	89	54	+35	88	Qualified to the 2011–12 CONCACAF Champions League Preliminary Round (Note: Tauro and San Francisco qualified to the 2011–12 CONCACAF Champions League as 2010 Apertura and 2011 Clausura champions respectively. Tauro earned the Panama 1 spot and San Francisco earned the Panama 2 spot based on 36-match aggregate record of 2010 Apertura and 2011 Clausura only (Tauro: 63 pts; San Francisco 62 pts).)
2	Chorrillo	54	23	17	14	58	45	+13	86	
3	Tauro	54	24	13	17	72	59	+13	85	Qualified to the 2011–12 CONCACAF Champions League Group Stage
4	Árabe Unido	54	21	19	14	60	51	+9	82	
5	Atlético Chiriquí	54	20	16	18	69	70	−1	76	
6	Sporting San Miguelito	54	19	17	18	61	53	+8	74	
7	Plaza Amador	54	18	18	18	65	66	−1	72	
8	Alianza	54	16	13	25	55	69	−14	61	
9	Chepo	54	14	13	27	50	73	−23	55	
10	Atlético Veragüense (R)	54	15	9	30	49	88	−39	54	

Rules for classification: 1) points; 2) goal difference; 3) number of goals scored.
(R) Relegated
