= 2008 ANAPROF Apertura =

Season of Panamanian football

ANAPROF
- Season: Apertura 2008
- Champions: -
- Relegated: -
- -: -

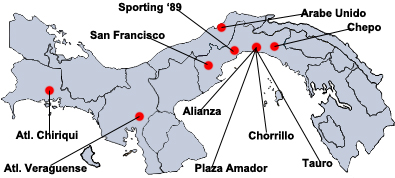
ANAPROF 2008 Apertura team distribution

In Panamanian football, the ANAPROF Apertura 2008 season (officially "Torneo Apertura 2008") started on February 22, 2008. San Francisco F.C. was the league champion, defeating Tauro F.C. 3–1 in the final.

== Changes for Apertura 2008 ==
- The league was split into two groups for the regular season with a 4-team playoff after the season was completed. The semifinals are two-leg playoffs, and the final is a single match. The 4 teams qualified for the playoff are decided based in an aggregate table.
- Group A is integrated by Atlético Chiriquí, Atletico Veragüense, San Francisco F.C., Plaza Amador and Municipal Chorrillo and Group B is integrated by Tauro F.C., Arabe Unido, Chepo F.C., Sporting San Miguelito and Alianza.
- The last team in the general standings will play a playoff against the champion of Primera A instead of facing direct relegation.
- The total numbers of games was reduced to 13 game weeks because the Panamanian football federation wanted to end the season as soon as possible in order to have all national team players ready for the 2010 World Cup qualification.

== Teams ==
Club	City	Stadium
Alianza F.C.	Panama City	Estadio Camping Resort
CD Árabe Unido	Colon	Estadio Armando Dely Valdés
Atlético Chiriquí	Boquete	Estadio Benigno Tomas Argote
Atlético Veragüense	Santiago	Estadio Virgilio Tejeira
Chepo F.C.	Chepo	Estadio Bernardo Gil
Chorrillo F.C.	Panama City	Estadio Municipal de Balboa
Plaza Amador	Panama City	Estadio Bernardo Gil
San Francisco F.C.	La Chorrera	Estadio Virgilio Tejeira
Sporting San Miguelito	San Miguelito	Estadio Bernardo Gil
Tauro F.C.	Panama City	Estadio Giancarlo Gronchi de Pedregal

== Standings ==
Pos	Team	Pld	W	D	L	GF	GA	GD	Pts	Qualification
1	Tauro F.C.	13	7	2	4	21	18	+3	23	Semifinal
2	San Francisco F.C.	13	5	6	2	19	15	+4	21	Semifinal
3	Chepo F.C.	13	5	5	3	19	12	+7	20	Semifinal
4	Sporting San Miguelito	13	6	2	5	18	16	+2	20	Semifinal
5	Árabe Unido	13	6	2	5	15	14	+1	20	
6	Plaza Amador	13	4	7	2	13	9	+4	19	
7	Chorrillo F.C.	13	3	7	3	14	13	+1	16	
8	Atlético Chiriquí	13	4	3	6	14	22	−8	15	
9	Atlético Veragüense	13	2	5	6	15	28	−13	11	
10	Alianza	13	3	1	9	25	27	−2	10	

=== Group A ===
Pos	Team	Pld	W	D	L	GF	GA	GD	Pts	Qualification
1	San Francisco F.C.	13	5	6	2	19	15	+4	21	Semifinal
2	Plaza Amador	13	4	7	2	13	9	+4	19	
3	Chorrillo F.C.	13	3	7	3	14	13	+1	16	
4	Atlético Chiriquí	13	4	3	6	14	22	−8	15	
5	Atlético Veragüense	13	2	5	6	15	28	−13	11	

=== Group B ===
Pos	Team	Pld	W	D	L	GF	GA	GD	Pts	Qualification
1	Tauro F.C.	13	7	2	4	21	18	+3	23	Semifinal
2	Chepo F.C.	13	5	5	3	19	12	+7	20	Semifinal
3	Sporting San Miguelito	13	6	2	5	18	16	+2	20	Semifinal
4	Árabe Unido	13	6	2	5	15	14	+1	20	
5	Alianza	13	3	1	9	25	27	−2	10	

== Results table ==
Home \ Away	ALI	ÁRA	ACH	AVE	CHE	CHO	PLA	SAN	SPO	TAU
Alianza	—	2–1	6–1	6–0	1–2	bye	1–1	bye	0–1	2–3
Árabe Unido	2–1	—	1–2	bye	1–0	0–1	bye	2–1	2–1	1–0
Atl. Chiríqui	bye	bye	—	1–2	0–1	0–0	2–1	0–1	bye	2–1
Atl. Veragüense	bye	1–1	1–1	—	bye	1–1	0–1	1–2	bye	1–2
Chepo	5–1	1–2	bye	3–1	—	bye	0–0	bye	2–0	2–3
Chorrillo	2–0	bye	4–1	0–1	1–1	—	1–4	0–0	bye	1–1
Plaza Amador	bye	1–0	1–1	2–2	bye	1–1	—	0–0	0–1	bye
San Francisco	4–3	bye	2–1	2–2	1–1	2–2	0–0	—	1–2	bye
Sporting	3–1	1–1	1–2	5–2	0–0	1–0	bye	bye	—	2–3
Tauro	2–1	2–1	bye	bye	1–1	bye	0–1	1–3	2–0	—

Legend: Blue = home team win; Yellow = draw; Red = away team win.

== Final round ==
Semifinals (agg)
Tauro F.C.	3
Sporting San Miguelito	0
San Francisco F.C.	2
Chepo F.C.	2

Final
Tauro F.C.	1
San Francisco F.C.	3

=== Semifinals 1st Leg (Semifinales - Juego de ida) ===
May 16, 2008

Sporting San Miguelito	0-1	Tauro F.C.
		Edwin Aguilar 90'

Estadio Bernardo Gil

May 18, 2008

Chepo F.C.	2-0	San Francisco F.C.
Carlos Martinez 65' 69'

Estadio Bernardo Gil

=== Semifinals 2nd Leg (Semifinales - Juego de vuelta) ===
May 24, 2008

San Francisco F.C.	2-0	Chepo F.C.
Manuel Torres 15'; Eduardo Jiménez 51'
Penalties
Alberto Zapata (penalty scored); Eduardo Jiménez (penalty missed); Temistocles Perez (penalty scored); Juan Ramón Solís (penalty missed); Manuel Torres (penalty scored)	3-1	Luis Jaramillo (penalty scored); Carlos Martinez (penalty missed); Jose Luis Gonzalez (penalty missed); Delano Welch (penalty missed)

Estadio Virgilio Tejeira

San Francisco advances to final 3–1 on penalties

May 25, 2008

Tauro F.C.	2-0	Sporting San Miguelito
Rolando Blackburn 11'; Eric Quiroz 47'

Estadio Giancarlo Gronchi de Pedregal

=== Final ===
May 31, 2008

San Francisco F.C.	3-1	Tauro F.C.
Manuel Torres 50'; Angel Lombardo 99'; Temistocles Perez 103'		Dorian Lopez 33'

Estadio Armando Dely Valdés

Apertura 2008 champion

5th title

Since San Francisco already qualified for 2008–09 CONCACAF Champions League, Tauro also qualified.

== Top goalscorers ==
Position	Player	Scored for	Goals
1	(Panama) César Medina	Alianza	12
2	(Panama) Edwin Aguilar	Tauro	9
3	(Panama) Alberto Zapata	San Francisco	7
4	(Panama) Alcibiades Rojas	Veragüense	6
5	(Panama) Carlos Martinez	Chepo	5
-	(El Salvador) Rúsvel Saravia	San Francisco	5
7	(Panama) Manuel Torres	San Francisco	4
-	(Panama) Luis Moreno	Tauro	4
-	(Panama) Luis Angel Rodriguez	Sporting	4
-	(Panama) Delano Welch	Chepo	4

== Goalscorers by team ==
Club	Club goals	Goals	Nat.	Player
Alianza F.C.	24	12	(Panama)	César Medina
Alianza F.C.	24	2	(Panama)	Miguel Castillo
Alianza F.C.	24	2	(Panama)	Ricardo Palomino
Alianza F.C.	24	2	(Panama)	Javier Gonzalez
Alianza F.C.	24	1	(Panama)	Jonathan Aviles
Alianza F.C.	24	1	(Argentina)	Diego Maier
Alianza F.C.	24	1	(Panama)	Ramon Romero (OG)
Alianza F.C.	24	1	(Argentina)	Julio Carpetta
Alianza F.C.	24	1	(Panama)	Lucio Lopez
Alianza F.C.	24	1	(Panama)	Adolfo Machado
Alianza F.C.	24	1	(Panama)	Carlos Dixon
Árabe Unido	15	4	(Panama)	Eduardo McTaggart
Árabe Unido	15	4	(Panama)	Publio Rodriguez
Árabe Unido	15	2	(Panama)	Luis Gondola
Árabe Unido	15	1	(Colombia)	Juan Sergio Guzman
Árabe Unido	15	1	(Colombia)	Andres Corpete
Árabe Unido	15	1	(Panama)	Anthony Basil
Árabe Unido	15	1	(Panama)	Armando Cooper
Árabe Unido	15	1	(Panama)	Antonio Leslie
Atlético Chiriquí	14	3	(Panama)	Catalino Smith
Atlético Chiriquí	14	2	(Panama)	Anthony Valdes
Atlético Chiriquí	14	1	(Panama)	Antonio Ortega
Atlético Chiriquí	14	1	(Panama)	Richard Peralta
Atlético Chiriquí	14	1	(Panama)	Oscar Vargas
Atlético Chiriquí	14	1	(Panama)	Clive Trotman
Atlético Chiriquí	14	1	(Panama)	Eybir Bonaga
Atlético Chiriquí	14	1	(Colombia)	Rodman Gonzalez
Atlético Chiriquí	14	1	(Panama)	Omar Navarro
Atlético Chiriquí	14	1	(Panama)	Manuel Torres
Atlético Chiriquí	14	1	(Panama)	José Ortega
Atlético Veragüense	15	6	(Panama)	Alcibiades Rojas
Atlético Veragüense	15	4	(Panama)	Neftali Diaz
Atlético Veragüense	15	2	(Panama)	Cristian Vega
Atlético Veragüense	15	1	(Panama)	Enzo Salazar
Atlético Veragüense	15	1	(Panama)	Jesús González
Atlético Veragüense	15	1	(Panama)	Miguel González
Chepo F.C.	21	5	(Panama)	Carlos Martinez
Chepo F.C.	21	4	(Panama)	Delano Welch
Chepo F.C.	21	4	(Panama)	Gerardo Barrios
Chepo F.C.	21	2	(Panama)	Cesar Aguilar
Chepo F.C.	21	2	(Panama)	Ismael Menal
Chepo F.C.	21	2	(Panama)	Luis Jaramillo
Chepo F.C.	21	1	(Panama)	Armando Gun
Chepo F.C.	21	1	(Panama)	José Luis González
Chorrillo F.C.	14	3	(Panama)	Anel Canales
Chorrillo F.C.	14	3	(Panama)	Julio Medina III
Chorrillo F.C.	14	2	(Panama)	Silvio Morelos
Chorrillo F.C.	14	1	(Panama)	Johnny Ruiz
Chorrillo F.C.	14	1	(Panama)	Alberto Skinner
Chorrillo F.C.	14	1	(Panama)	Derek James
Chorrillo F.C.	14	1	(Panama)	Roberto Stewart
Chorrillo F.C.	14	1	(Panama)	Jean Carlos Cedeño
Chorrillo F.C.	14	1	(Panama)	Leonel Parrish
Plaza Amador	13	4	(Panama)	Ricardo Buitrago
Plaza Amador	13	2	(Panama)	Cesar Blackman
Plaza Amador	13	2	(Panama)	Engie Mitre
Plaza Amador	13	2	(Panama)	José Moreno
Plaza Amador	13	1	(Panama)	Jean Estribi
Plaza Amador	13	1	(Panama)	Richard Dixon
Plaza Amador	13	1	(Panama)	Alfredo Hernandez
San Francisco F.C.	24	7	(Panama)	Alberto Zapata
San Francisco F.C.	24	5	(El Salvador)	Rúsvel Saravia
San Francisco F.C.	24	4	(Panama)	Manuel Torres
San Francisco F.C.	24	3	(Panama)	Angel Lombardo
San Francisco F.C.	24	2	(Panama)	Eduardo Jiménez
San Francisco F.C.	24	1	(Argentina)	Victor Suarez
San Francisco F.C.	24	1	(Panama)	Carlos Rivera
San Francisco F.C.	24	1	(Panama)	Temistocles Perez
Sporting San Miguelito	18	4	(Panama)	Luis Angel Rodriguez
Sporting San Miguelito	18	3	(Panama)	Luis Morales
Sporting San Miguelito	18	2	(Colombia)	Edwin Antero
Sporting San Miguelito	18	2	(Panama)	Federico Marines
Sporting San Miguelito	18	2	(Panama)	Luis Valderrama
Sporting San Miguelito	18	1	(Panama)	Luis Mendoza
Sporting San Miguelito	18	1	(Panama)	Francisco Garcia
Sporting San Miguelito	18	1	(Panama)	Cristobal Tenorio
Sporting San Miguelito	18	1	(Panama)	Ricardo Phillips
Sporting San Miguelito	18	1	(Panama)	Osvaldo Solanilla
Tauro F.C.	25	9	(Panama)	Edwin Aguilar
Tauro F.C.	25	4	(Panama)	Luis Moreno
Tauro F.C.	25	3	(Panama)	Brunet Hay
Tauro F.C.	25	3	(Panama)	Eric Quiroz
Tauro F.C.	25	2	(Panama)	Gabriel Ríos
Tauro F.C.	25	1	(Panama)	Alexis King
Tauro F.C.	25	1	(Panama)	Reggie Arosemena
Tauro F.C.	25	1	(Panama)	Rolando Blackburn
Tauro F.C.	25	1	(Colombia)	Dorian Lopez

== Local derby statistics ==
El Super Clasico Nacional - Tauro v Plaza Amador

March 8, 2008

Tauro	0–1	Plaza Amador
		Jean Estribi 22'

Giancarlo Gronchi

Clasico del Pueblo - Plaza Amador v Chorillo

March 30, 2008

Plaza Amador	1–1	Chorrillo F.C.
Ricardo Buitrago 12'		Anel Canales 4'

Bernardo Gil

May 4, 2008

Chorrillo F.C.	1–4	Plaza Amador
Jean Carlos Cedeño 80'		Jose Moreno 8' 34'; Ricardo Buitrago 60'; Engie Mitre 63'

Balboa

Clasico Interiorano - Atlético Chiriquí v Atlético Veragüense

March 8, 2008

Atlético Chiriquí	1–2	Atlético Veragüense
Richard Peralta 6'		Neftali Diaz 61' 76'

Benigno Argote

April 19, 2008

Atlético Veragüense	1–1	Atlético Chiriquí
Alcibiades Rojas 41'		Catalino Smith 44'

Virgilio Tejeira
