= 2009 Liga Panameña de Fútbol season =

Liga Panameña de Fútbol
- Season: 2009
- Champions: Apertura I: San Francisco (6th title); Apertura II: Árabe Unido (5th title)
- 2009–10 CONCACAF Champions League: San Francisco
- 2010–11 CONCACAF Champions League: Árabe Unido
- Top goalscorer: Apertura I: Edwin Aguilar (18 goals); Apertura II: Armando Polo (12 goals)
- Biggest home win: Sporting San Miguelito 7–0 Alianza
- Biggest away win: Alianza 1–4 Atlético Veragüense
- Highest scoring: Atlético Veragüense 3–5 Tauro; San Francisco 3–5 Tauro; Sporting San Miguelito 4–4 Tauro; Atlético Chiriquí 4–4 Tauro

The 2009 Liga Panameña de Fútbol season was the 22nd season of top-flight football in Panama.

== Teams ==
Locations of the 2009 LPF teams

Club	City	Stadium
Alianza	Panama City	Estadio Camping Resort
Árabe Unido	Colón	Estadio Armando Dely Valdés
Atlético Chiriquí	David	Estadio San Cristobal
Atlético Veragüense	Santiago	Estadio Aristocles Castillo
Chepo	Chepo	Cancha Sintetica Rommel Fernández (in Panama City)
Chorrillo	Panama City	Estadio Javier Cruz
Plaza Amador	Panama City	Estadio Javier Cruz
San Francisco	La Chorrera	Estadio Agustín Sánchez
Sporting San Miguelito	San Miguelito	Estadio Bernardo Gil
Tauro	Panama City	Cancha Sintetica Rommel Fernández (in Panama City)

== Apertura I ==
=== First round ===
==== Standings ====
Pos	Team	Pld	W	D	L	GF	GA	GD	Pts	Qualification
1	Tauro	18	10	6	2	40	23	+17	36	Qualified to the final round
2	Atlético Chiriquí	18	10	3	5	35	19	+16	33	Qualified to the final round
3	San Francisco	18	10	3	5	29	16	+13	33	Qualified to the final round
4	Chorrillo	18	8	8	2	32	17	+15	32	Qualified to the final round
5	Chepo	18	10	2	6	37	24	+13	32	
6	Sporting San Miguelito	18	8	4	6	28	19	+9	28	
7	Árabe Unido	18	7	4	7	29	24	+5	25	
8	Atlético Veragüense	18	3	4	11	20	44	−24	13	
9	Alianza	18	2	5	11	22	43	−21	11	
10	Plaza Amador	18	2	1	15	13	56	−43	7	

Source: rsssf

==== Results table ====
Home \ Away	ALI	ÁRA	ACH	AVE	CHE	CHO	PLA	SAN	SPO	TAU
Alianza	—	1–3	4–4	1–1	0–4	0–0	1–0	0–3	0–3	2–3
Árabe Unido	2–0	—	2–0	6–0	1–3	1–3	4–0	0–1	1–0	2–3
Atl. Chiríqui	2–3	2–0	—	3–0	1–0	0–0	4–0	3–0	3–0	1–2
Atl. Veragüense	4–3	3–0	1–2	—	2–4	0–4	1–0	0–1	1–1	0–1
Chepo	2–0	1–1	0–1	4–1	—	1–1	4–1	2–0	0–1	4–1
Chorrillo	3–3	1–1	2–1	2–2	2–0	—	5–1	1–2	1–0	1–1
Plaza Amador	2–1	2–0	1–4	1–1	2–3	1–4	—	0–5	0–1	1–2
San Francisco	3–0	1–1	2–1	2–1	1–2	0–1	4–0	—	1–1	1–0
Sporting	2–2	1–2	1–2	5–1	2–1	2–0	5–0	2–1	—	1–1
Tauro	2–1	2–2	1–1	4–1	6–2	1–1	7–1	1–1	2–0	—

Legend: Blue = home team win; Yellow = draw; Red = away team win.

=== Final round ===
Semifinals (agg)
Chorrillo	6
Tauro	1
San Francisco	3
Atlético Chiriquí	2

Final
Chorrillo	0
San Francisco	0

==== Semifinals ====
Semifinal 1

June 6, 2009

Chorrillo	3–1	Tauro
Angel Lombardo 31'; Johnny Ruiz 38'; Bernardo Palma 85'		Edwin Aguilar 45'

Estadio Javier Cruz

June 10, 2009

Tauro	0–3	Chorrillo
		Johnny Ruiz 60'; Rennan Addles 76'; Johnny Ruiz 82'

Cancha Sintetica Rommel Fernández

Semifinal 2

June 6, 2009

San Francisco	0–1	Atlético Chiriquí
		Auriel Gallardo 3'

Estadio Agustín Sánchez

June 10, 2009

Atlético Chiriquí	1–3	San Francisco
Clive Trottman 76'		Ricardo Phillips 12'; Brunet Hay 47'; Boris Alfaro 55'

Estadio San Cristobal

==== Final ====
June 13, 2009

Chorrillo	0–0	San Francisco
Penalties
Engie Mitre (penalty missed); Caio Milan (penalty scored); Johnny Ruiz (penalty missed); Diego Mosquera (penalty scored); Marcos Villareal (penalty missed); Derek James (penalty scored); Julio Medina III (penalty scored); Cesar Blackman (penalty missed)	4–5	(penalty missed) Victor Herrera; (penalty missed) Brunet Hay; (penalty scored) Wess Torres; (penalty missed) Alberto Manotas; (penalty scored) Manuel Torres; (penalty scored) William Negrete; (penalty scored) Amir White; (penalty scored) Ricardo Phillips

Estadio Agustín Sánchez

Apertura 2009 champion
San Francisco
6th title

San Francisco qualified for 2009–10 CONCACAF Champions League.

=== Top goalscorers ===
Pos	Player	Scored for	Goals
1	(Panama) Edwin Aguilar	Tauro	18
2	(Panama) Johnny Ruiz	Chorrillo	17
3	(Panama) Luis Jaramillo	Chepo	11
4	(Panama) Auriel Gallardo	Atlético Chiriquí	10
5	(Panama) Rennan Addles	Chorrillo	9
5	(Panama) Boris Alfaro	San Francisco	9
5	(Panama) Oscar Vargas	Atlético Chiriquí	9
8	(Panama) Orlando Rodríguez	Árabe Unido	8
9	(Colombia) Luis Escobar	Tauro	6
9	(Panama) Armando Polo	Sporting San Miguelito	6
9	(Panama) Anthony Valdes	Chiriquí	6

== Apertura II ==
The Apertura II (officially the 2009 Copa Digicel Apertura for sponsorship reasons) was the second tournament of the season. It started August 8 and ended on December 13. Árabe Unido were crowned champions of the Liga Panameña de Fútbol for the fifth time after beating Tauro 3-2 in the final. With this win Árabe Unido earned a spot in the 2010–11 CONCACAF Champions League.

=== First round ===
==== Standings ====
Pos	Team	Pld	W	D	L	GF	GA	GD	Pts	Qualification
1	Árabe Unido	18	11	5	2	28	12	+16	38	Qualified to the final round
2	Atlético Chiriquí	18	11	2	5	36	26	+10	35	Qualified to the final round
3	Tauro	18	9	5	4	38	22	+16	32	Qualified to the final round
4	Chorrillo	18	7	6	5	21	21	0	27	Qualified to the final round
5	San Francisco	18	7	5	6	25	23	+2	26	
6	Sporting San Miguelito	18	7	4	7	37	30	+7	25	
7	Plaza Amador	18	7	3	8	26	30	−4	24	
8	Chepo	18	3	8	7	16	25	−9	17	
9	Atlético Veragüense	18	3	4	11	22	36	−14	13	
10	Alianza	18	1	6	11	12	36	−24	9	

Source: rsssf

==== Results ====
Home \ Away	ALI	ÁRA	ACH	AVE	CHE	CHO	PLA	SAN	SPO	TAU
Alianza	—	0–0	1–2	1–4	0–0	1–1	2–1	2–2	0–2	0–2
Árabe Unido	3–0	—	2–1	4–2	1–0	2–1	3–1	1–1	2–0	2–0
Atl. Chiríqui	3–1	2–1	—	4–0	3–0	1–0	4–2	2–0	3–0	0–2
Atl. Veragüense	0–0	0–0	1–2	—	1–1	0–1	3–0	0–1	1–0	3–5
Chepo	3–2	0–1	2–2	2–0	—	1–1	1–3	0–0	3–3	1–0
Chorrillo	1–0	1–0	1–1	2–2	2–1	—	2–3	3–2	3–2	2–1
Plaza Amador	1–1	0–2	2–1	4–2	2–0	0–0	—	2–1	3–4	0–0
San Francisco	2–0	0–1	4–0	3–2	0–0	1–0	1–0	—	1–0	3–5
Sporting	7–0	2–2	2–3	2–1	1–1	3–0	1–2	3–1	—	4–4
Tauro	2–1	1–1	5–2	4–0	3–0	0–0	2–0	2–2	0–1	—

Legend: Blue = home team win; Yellow = draw; Red = away team win.

=== Final round ===
Semifinals (agg)
Árabe Unido	4
Chorrillo	3
Atlético Chiriquí	4
Tauro	7

Final
Árabe Unido	3
Tauro	2

==== Semifinals ====
Semifinal 1

November 28, 2009

Chorrillo	3–0	Árabe Unido
Johnny Ruiz 15' 47'; Alcibiades Rojas 77'

Estadio Javier Cruz

December 6, 2009

Árabe Unido	4–0	Chorrillo
Orlando Rodríguez 24'; Victor Rene Mendieta Jr. 28'; Alejandro Veléz 43'; Camilo Aguirre 113'; Camilo Aguirre (red card) 113'

Cancha Sintetica Rommel Fernández

Semifinal 2

November 28, 2009

Tauro	3–0	Atlético Chiriquí
Escobar 25', 39', 72'

Cancha Sintetica Rommel Fernández

December 5, 2009

Atlético Chiriquí	4–4	Tauro
Auriel Gallardo 10'; Davis Granados 56'; Gabriel Ávila 62'; Javier Mercado 65'		Ricardo Amor 9'; Luis Tejada 41' 59'; Temistocles Perez 90'

Estadio San Cristobal

==== Final ====
December 13, 2009
16:00 (UTC-5)

Árabe Unido	3–2	Tauro
Mendieta, Jr. 14'; Carroll 77'; Rodríguez 89'		Pérez 28', 54'

Estadio Agustín Sánchez, La Chorrera

Apertura II 2009 champion
Árabe Unido
5th title

Árabe Unido qualified for 2010–11 CONCACAF Champions League.

=== Top goalscorers ===
Position	Player	Scored for	Goals
1	(Panama) Armando Polo	Sporting San Miguelito	12
2	(Panama) Orlando Rodríguez (Panama) Luis Tejada (Colombia) Johan de Avila	Árabe Unido; Tauro; Atlético Veragüense	10
5	(Panama) Edwin Aguilar	Tauro	9
6	(Panama) Luis Morales	Sporting San Miguelito	8
7	(Panama) Anthony Basile (Panama) Johnny Ruiz (Panama) Temistocles Perez (Colombia) Luis Escobar	Plaza Amador; Chorrillo; Tauro; Tauro	7

== Relegation table ==
For the second year in a row, Alianza had the fewest points at the end of the season and had to face Liga Nacional de Ascenso champion Río Abajo. Just as last year, Alianza defeated Río Abajo and stayed in the LPF.

Pos	Team	Pld	W	D	L	GF	GA	GD	Pts	Qualification
1	Tauro	36	19	11	6	78	45	+33	68	
2	Atlético Chiriquí	36	21	5	10	71	45	+26	68	
3	Árabe Unido	36	18	9	9	57	36	+21	63	
4	San Francisco	36	17	8	11	54	39	+15	59	
5	Chorrillo	36	15	14	7	53	38	+15	59	
6	Sporting San Miguelito	36	15	8	13	65	48	+17	53	
7	Chepo	36	13	10	13	53	49	+4	49	
8	Plaza Amador	36	9	4	23	39	86	−47	31	
9	Atlético Veragüense	36	6	8	22	42	80	−38	26	
10	Alianza	36	3	11	22	34	79	−45	20	Relegation playoff

=== Promotion playoff ===
December 16, 2009

Alianza	1–1	Río Abajo
López 4'		Viveros 21'

Cancha Sintetica Rommel Fernández, Panama City

December 19, 2009

Río Abajo	0–1	Alianza
		Aguilar 87'

Cancha Sintetica Rommel Fernández, Panama City
