= Atlético Chiriquí =

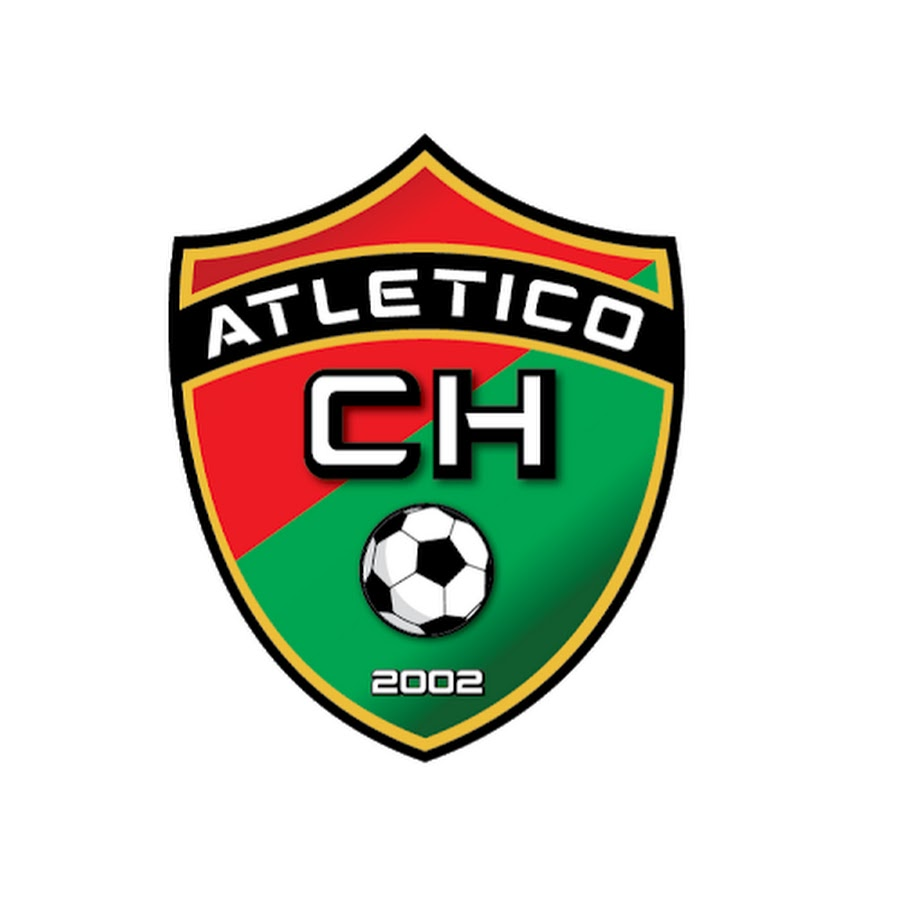
- Full name: Club Atlético Chiriquí
- Nicknames: Los purasangre Los tigres del norte Lobos
- Founded: June 18, 2002
- Ground: Estadio San Cristóbal; Chiriquí David, Panama
- Capacity: 3,000
- Chairman: (Colombia) César Valoyes
- Manager: (Colombia) Dayron Pérez
- League: Liga Panameña de Fútbol
- 2022(C): 6th
- Website: atleticochiriqui.com
Home colours	Away colours

Club Atlético Chiriquí is a Panamanian football team playing in Liga Panameña de Fútbol. It is based in David, Chiriquí and was founded on June 18, 2002 by Luis Denis Arce. Their home stadium is Estadio San Cristóbal.

== History ==
Atlético Chiriquí was founded by Luis Denis Arce on 18 June 2002 after the disappearance of Chiriquí F.C. in season 2001.

In 2004 the team gained promotion from the Liga Nacional de Ascenso to the Liga Panameña de Fútbol after beating Sabanitas 3–2 in the first match and 5–2 on the last match.

Opening season Apertura 2009 I came to semi-finals for the first time losing to San Francisco on aggregate 2 to 3, in Apertura 2009 II again came close to losing against Tauro semi-finals with an aggregate score of 4 to 7.

They bounced back from the Second Division in summer 2014 after being relegated a year earlier. They beat SUNTRACS 1–0 in the championship decider They earned their place in the final by winning the 2013 Apertura after beating Atlético Nacional 4–2 on aggregate.

Atlético Chiriquí's alternative crest

== Rivalries ==
Their biggest rivals are Atlético Veragüense, the matches between them are known as the clasico interiorano (The Interior derby).

== Stadium ==
Atlético Chiriquí plays their home matches in Estadio San Cristóbal. The stadium is named after the saint and neighborhood San Cristóbal.

== Honours ==
- Liga Nacional de Ascenso (3): 2004, 2014, 2019
- Super Final Ascenso LPF (2): 2014, 2019.

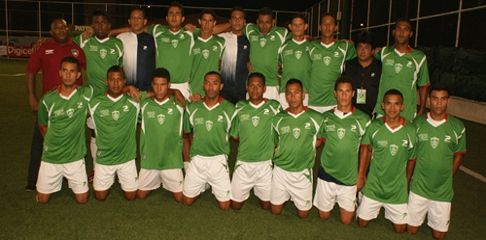

== Season to season ==
Season	Division	Place
2002	2A	7th
2003	2A	6th
2004	2A	1st
2005	1D	7th
2005	1D	6th
2006	1D	9th
2006	1D	9th
2007	1D	6th
2007	1D	5th
2008	1D	8th
2008	1D	8th
2009 I	1D	2nd
2009 II	1D	2nd
2010 II	1D	1st

- 5 seasons in Liga Panameña de Fútbol
- 3 seasons in Liga Nacional de Ascenso

== Year-by-year results ==
=== Liga Panameña de Fútbol ===
Season	Position	League Record								Playoffs	Top Scorer		Notes
		P	W	T	L	F	A	+/-	Pts		Player	G	
2005	7/10	18	5	6	7	15	24	−9	21	debut			
2005	6/10	16	4	5	7	20	25	−5	17	Could not qualify			
2006	9/10	18	4	6	8	18	29	−11	18	Could not qualify			
2006	9/10	18	2	4	12	14	30	−16	10	Could not qualify			
2007 (A)	6/10	18	7	4	7	24	13	+11	25	Could not qualify	(Colombia) José Dario Julio	7	
2007 (C)	5/10	18	6	8	4	21	20	−1	26	Could not qualify	(Panama) Catalino Smith	5	
2008 (A)	8/10	13	4	3	6	14	22	−8	15	Could not qualify	(Panama) Catalino Smith	3	
2008 (C)	8/10	18	5	4	9	19	42	−23	19	Could not qualify	(Panama) Eybir Bonaga	6	
2009 (A)I	2/10	20	10	6	2	35	19	+16	33	Semi-Finals	(Panama) Auriel Gallardo	10	Fell against San Francisco F.C. on aggregate 2–3
2009 (A)II	2/10	20	11	2	5	36	26	+10	35	Semi-Finals	(Panama) Oscar Vargas, (Panama) Gabriel Ávila	6	Fell against Tauro F.C. on aggregate 7–4
2010 (C)	1/10	20	10	3	5	28	21	+7	33	Semi-Finals	(Panama) Auriel Gallardo	7	Fell against San Francisco F.C. on aggregate 3–2
2010 (A)	8/10	18	4	7	7	22	29	-7	19	Could not qualify	(Panama) Gabriel de Los Rios	8	
2011 (C)	7/10	18	6	6	6	19	20	-1	24	Could not qualify	(Colombia) Julian Martinez	4	
2011 (A)	10/10	18	2	5	11	12	26	-14	11	Could not qualify	(Panama) Gabriel Rios	8	
2012 (C)	7/10	18	4	8	6	14	17	-3	20	Could not qualify			
2012 (A)	10/10	18	2	9	7	14	23	-9	15	Could not qualify	(Colombia) Álvaro Hurtado	2	
2013 (C)	9/10	18	2	9	7	18	24	-6	15	Could not qualify	(Panama) Jose Ortega	4	Relegation to Liga Ascenso
2014 (A)	9/10	18	4	7	7	16	21	-5	19	Could not qualify	(Panama) Miguel Saavedra	7	Promotion to LPF
2015 (C)	10/10	18	4	5	9	14	25	-11	17	Could not qualify	(Panama) Miguel Saavedra	5	
2015 (A)	10/10	18	2	8	8	17	31	-14	14	Could not qualify	(Panama) José Gómez	4	
2016 (C)	5/10	18	7	5	6	19	17	+2	26	Could not qualify	(Panama) Gabriel Ávila	4	Relegation to Liga Ascenso
2019 (A)	9/10	18	5	4	9	17	29	-12	19	Could not qualify	(Panama) Miguel Saavedra	6	Promotion to LPF
2020(A)	10/10	8	0	1	7	2	13	-11	1	Could not qualify	(Panama) Edgar Aparicio	1	Season suspended due to COVID-19
2020 (C)	9/10	9	0	5	4	6	11	-5	5	Could not qualify	(Panama) Yeison Ortega	1	Season resumed
New Format
2021 (A)	12/12 (6th West Conf.)	25	5	8	12	29	38	-9	23	Could not qualify	(Panama) Luis Pereira	4	
2021 (C)	11/12 (5th West Conf.)	16	3	6	7	12	17	-5	15	Could not qualify	(Panama) Isaias Soto	4	
2022 (A)	3/12 (1st West Conf.)	16	8	4	4	21	20	+1	28	Semi-Finals	(Panama) Edgar Aparicio	7	Fell against Alianza F.C. on aggregate 1-2
2022 (C)	12/12 (6th West Conf.)	16	1	8	7	7	25	-18	11	Could not qualify	(Panama) Jonathan Nisbeth	2	

== Players ==
=== Current squad ===
- As of Apertura 2023

Note: Flags indicate national team as defined under FIFA eligibility rules; some limited exceptions apply. Players may hold more than one non-FIFA nationality.

No.	Pos.	Nation	Player
1	GK	PAN	Jose Cubilla
25	GK	PAN	Edward Chacón
2	DF	PAN	Modesto Justiniani
3	DF	PAN	Porfirio Avila
4	DF	PAN	Amilcar Quiroz
6	DF	PAN	Roberto Meneses
19	DF	PAN	Jose Ortega
21	DF	COL	Andrés Palmezano
27	DF	PAN	Breysi García
30	DF	PAN	Yeison Ortega
38	DF	PAN	Daniel Hoyos
53	DF	PAN	Alan Miranda
7	MF	PAN	Isaac Alvarado
8	MF	PAN	Dario Wright
10	MF	PAN	Isaias Soto
13	MF	PAN	Chamell Asprilla
16	MF	COL	Freyn Figueroa

No.	Pos.	Nation	Player
18	MF	PAN	Raymond Barnes
24	MF	PAN	Jonathan Nisbeth
32	MF	PER	Ricardo Miranda
38	MF	PAN	Luis Cueto
44	MF	PAN	Zabdiel Vega
45	FW	PAN	Jhostin Armuelles
48	MF	PAN	Alan Miranda
56	MF	PAN	Juan Caparroso
70	MF	COL	Jean Becerra
80	FW	PAN	Rigoberto Aparicio
9	FW	PAN	Miguel Saavedra
11	FW	PAN	Arnold Villarreal
20	FW	PAN	Juvan De la Espada
37	FW	PAN	Arturo Aizpu
99	FW	PAN	Aaron Lowis
15	MF	COL	Juan Ramirez
—	MF	COL	Cristian Sanchez

=== Player of the year ===
Year	Winner
2007 (A)	(Colombia) José Dario Julio
2007 (C)	(Panama) Catalino Smith
2008 (A)	(Panama) Eybir Bonaga
2008 (C)	(Panama) Auriel Gallardo
2009 I(A)	(Panama) Martín Gómez
2009 II(A)	(Panama) Gabriel Ávila
2010 II(C)	(Panama) Oscar Vargas

=== Notable players ===
- Yarol Tafur

== Historical list of coaches ==
- (Panama) José Alfredo Poyatos (2006)
- (Colombia) Daniel Valencia (2007)
- (Colombia) Jair Palacios (2007)
- (Costa Rica) Leroy Foster (2008)
- (Panama) Mario Méndez (2008 – Nov 10)
- (Panama) Carlos Flores (Dec 2010 – July 11)
- (Colombia) Ismael Benítez (Aug 2011 – Aug 11)
- (Colombia) Orlando Arenas Valencia (Aug 2011– May 2012)
- (Panama) Mario Méndez (May 2012 – Mar 2013)
- (Costa Rica) Javier Wanchope (Mar 2013– Nov 2015)
- (Argentina) Patricio Sampó (January 2019 - September 2019)
- (Panama) Noel Gutiérrez (September 2019 - February 2020)
- (Argentina) Miguel Ángel Zahzú (March 2020 - July 2020)
- (Argentina) Patricio Sampó (August 2020 - June 2021)
- (Venezuela) Alberto "Nino" Valencia (2021-2022)
- (Colombia) Dayron Peréz (2022 - Present)
- (Venezuela) Jonathan Parra
- (Colombia) Herney Duque

== Sponsors ==
Companies that Atlético Chiriquí currently has sponsorship deals with include:

- (Spain) KELME – Official Partner.
- (Panama) Hotel Ciudad de David – Main Partner
- (Panama) Club Activo 20-30 – Main Partner
- (Panama) Transporte Rivera Hermanos S.A. – Main Partner
