= Martín Gómez =

Martín Gómez may refer to:

- Martín Gómez (footballer, born 1983), Argentine football forward
- Martín Gómez (Panamanian footballer) (born 1989), Panamanian football left-back for San Francisco
- Martín Gómez (footballer, born 2006), Argentine football attacking midfielder for Universidad Católica
