= Yarol Tafur =

Ecuadorian footballer (2001–2023)

Personal information
- Born: 4 April 2001 Esmeraldas, Ecuador
- Died: 3 September 2023 (aged 22) Esmeraldas, Ecuador

Sport
- Sport: Football
- Position: Forward

Yarol Ariel Tafur Bedoya (4 April 2001 – 3 September 2023) was an Ecuadorian footballer who played as a forward.

== Career ==
He began his career at Deportivo Quinindé, and later moved to the Catholic University of Ecuador, where he completed the training categories. In the little blue train he had the opportunity to play in Ecuador's Serie A matches and also participated in the 2019 Copa Sudamericana, playing in a match.

In 2020 he moved to Cuniburo in the Segunda Categoría. The following year he signed for Atlético Santo Domingo to play in Serie B, and later, in 2022, he played for Club 5 de Agosto, also in the Second Category.

In 2023, he joined Atlético Chiriquí of Panama, thus gaining his first international experience.

== National team ==
He was international with the Ecuador under-17 and under-20 team. With the sub-17 he participated in the 2017 Bolivarian Games.

== Clubs ==
Club	Country	Years
Universidad Católica	Ecuador	2017–2019
Cuniburo	Ecuador	2020
Atlético Santo Domingo	Ecuador	2021
5 de Agosto	Ecuador	2022
Atlético Chiriquí	Panama	2023

== Death ==
Tafur was shot dead on 3 September 2023 in the town of El Panecillo, in the province of Esmeraldas, while he was at a party.
