= Nelson Barahona =

Panamanian football attacking midfielder (born 1987)

Personal information
- Full name: Nelson Alberto Barahona Collins
- Date of birth: 22 November 1987 (age 38)
- Place of birth: Colón, Panama
- Height: 1.71 m (5 ft 7 in)
- Position: Attacking midfielder

Team information
- Current team: Real Cartagena

Youth career
- Escuelita Blanco y Negro
- 2004–2006: Árabe Unido

Senior career*
Years	Team	Apps	(Gls)
2006–2009	Árabe Unido	74	(10)
2008	→ Fénix (loan)	11	(1)
2009	→ Atlético Huila (loan)	26	(1)
2010–2012	Independiente Medellín	30	(5)
2011	→ Caracas (loan)	13	(3)
2011	→ Deportivo Táchira (loan)	7	(1)
2012	→ Atlético Huila (loan)	26	(4)
2013	Itagüí	32	(2)
2014	Alianza Petrolera	31	(0)
2015	San Francisco	8	(0)
2015–2016	Alianza Petrolera	47	(5)
2017–2018	Árabe Unido	43	(5)
2018	Cartaginés	13	(1)
2019–	Real Cartagena	1	(0)

International career^{‡}
2007	Panama U-20	5	(2)
2008	Panama U-23	6	(2)
2007–2019	Panama	46	(4)
- * Club domestic league appearances and goals as of 11 February 2019 ‡ National team caps and goals as of 23 March 2013

Nelson Alberto Barahona Collins (born 22 November 1987 in Colón) is a retired Panamanian football attacking midfielder.

== Club career ==
Nicknamed el Ruso, Barahona played numerous of years in Árabe Unido's youth team before in 2007 making his debut with the senior team. After having several good appearances with the club and the Panama youth team he moved to Uruguayan side Fénix. Russo made his league debut with Fénix as a second-half substitute on 27 February 2008 against Nacional. Unfortunately, Fénix were relegated and Barahona returned to ANAPROF side Árabe Unido where he was crowned champion of the ANAPROF Clausura 2008.

On 28 February 2009 Barahona signed a 1-year loan contract with Colombian side Atlético Huila making him the second Panamanian in team after Amilcar Henriquez was signed in December 2008. He played his last game for Árabe Unido on 27 February 2009.

By 2010 he was transferred to Independiente Medellín, a club with which he had the chance to play the 2010 Copa Libertadores. At the end of the year, he was loaned to Venezuelan side Caracas FC.

In mid-2011 he returned to Independiente Medellín, club owner of his sports rights, but on 2 September 2011 he was hired by Deportivo Táchira of Venezuela whom he subsequently left in December 2011.

On 17 January 2012 Atlético Huila confirmed him as the new reinforcement for the 2012 season, Barahona joining compatriots Amílcar Henríquez and Alejandro Vélez at the club. This is his second stay in the club. In February 2013, he signed with Itagüí and he moved to Alianza Petrolera in December 2013.

In 2015, Barahona returned to Panama after seven years abroad to play for San Francisco.

== International career ==
Barahona was part of the Panama U-20 squad that participated in the 2007 FIFA U-20 World Cup in Canada. He scored Panama's only goal of the tournament against Czech Republic.

He made his senior debut for Panama on 22 August 2007 against Guatemala and has, as of 1 May 2015, earned a total of 45 caps, scoring 4 goals. He represented his country in 13 FIFA World Cup qualification matches and was part of the national team that won the 2009 UNCAF Nations Cup in Honduras. In 2011, he was called up by Julio Dely Valdés to play at the 2011 CONCACAF Gold Cup.

=== International goals ===
Scores and results list Panama's goal tally first.

#	Date	Venue	Opponent	Score	Result	Competition
1	20 May 2009	Estadio Brigadier General Estanislao López, Santa Fe, Argentina	Argentina	1–1	1–3	Friendly
2	5 July 2009	Oakland–Alameda County Coliseum, Oakland, United States	Guadeloupe	1–2	1–2	2009 CONCACAF Gold Cup
3	12 June 2012	Estadio Rommel Fernández, Panama City, Panama	Cuba	1–0	1–0	2014 World Cup qualifier
4	16 October 2012	Estadio Pedro Marrero, Havana, Cuba	Cuba	1–1	1–1	2014 World Cup qualifier

== Honours ==
=== Club ===
Árabe Unido

- ANAPROF Clausura 2008

Atlético Huila

- Torneo Finalización 2009 (Runner-up)

Mejor jugador de fútbol profesional local COSAWARDS 2017

=== National ===
- 2009 UNCAF Nations Cup
