= Martín Gómez (Panamanian footballer) =

Panamanian footballer (born 1989)

Personal information
- Full name: Martín Antonio Gómez Rodríguez
- Date of birth: January 23, 1989 (age 37)
- Place of birth: Chiriquí Province, Panama
- Height: 1.80 m (5 ft 11 in)
- Position: Left-back

Youth career
- 2005–2006: Atlético Chiriquí B

Senior career*
Years	Team	Apps	(Gls)
2006–2011	Atlético Chiriquí	129	(5)
2011–2023	San Francisco	303	(7)

International career
2009	Panama U-20	6	(0)
2010	Panama U-21	2	(0)
2009–2016	Panama	8	(1)
- * Club domestic league appearances and goals as of 4 October 2018

Martín Antonio Gómez Rodríguez (born 23 January 1989) is a Panamanian former football player who played as a left-back.

== Club career ==
Gómez played for Atlético Chiriquí before moving to San Francisco in 2011.

== International career ==
He made his debut for the Panama on March 13, 2009, against Trinidad & Tobago.

His final international was an August 2011 friendly match against Bolivia, although he was named as an emergency replacement for Ismael Díaz at the 2016 Copa América Centenario.

=== International goals ===
Scores and results list Panama's goal tally first.

#	Date	Venue	Opponent	Score	Result	Competition
1	17 February 2016	Estadio Maracaná (Panama), Panama City, Panama	El Salvador	1–0	1–0	Friendly match
