= Chepo F.C. =

Panamanian association football team

Chepo
- Full name: Chepo Fútbol Club
- Nicknames: Los Naranjas; Los Tigrillos
- Founded: 1999
- Dissolved: 2016
- Ground: Estadio Óscar Sumán Carrillo; Panama City, Panama
- Chairman: Peter Johnson
- League: Liga Panameña de Fútbol
Home colours	Away colours

Chepo F.C. was a Panamanian football team playing at the Liga Panameña de Fútbol. The team folded mid 2016. It was based in Chepo.

Chepo was known for its youth system of whom have emerged many future promises of Panamanian football, among those are: Armando Gun, Gabriel Torres, Eduardo Jiménez, José Calderón and Román Torres, all of whom have represented Panama.

== History ==
=== Proyecto 2000 ===
Chepo FC was founded in 1999 under the name of Proyecto 2000, where it gathered young players from around the country aspiring to win a ticket to the Liga Panameña de Fútbol one day. They started playing in the Liga Distritorial de Fútbol de Panamá (Lidifutpa).

In 2000 the team was renamed Chepo FC due to expansion and participated in 2003 in Primera A.

In 2006 the team gained promotion from Primera A to the Liga Panameña de Fútbol after beating Pan de Azúcar 2–1. They have not been very successful at the highest level and only reached the semi-finals of the 2008 Apertura season.

By May 2016 main sponsor retired support causing the team to fold, it was replaced by Liga Nacional de Ascenso runner-up S.D. Atlético Veragüense.

== Honours ==
- Primera A: 1

2006

- Copa Rommel Fernández: 1

2003

== Year-by-year results ==
=== Liga Panameña de Fútbol ===
Season	Position	League Record								Play-offs	Top Scorer		Notes
		P	W	T	L	F	A	+/-	Pts		Player	G	
2007 (A)	5/10	18	8	4	6	27	27	0	28	Could not qualify	Gabriel Torres	11	Did not qualify because of goal differential
2007 (C)	7/10	18	6	5	7	23	21	+2	23	Could not qualify	Gabriel Torres	9	Gabriel Torres was top-scorer of the season
2008 (A)	3/10	15	6	5	4	21	14	+7	23	Semi-finals	Carlos Martinez	5	
2008 (C)	4/10	20	9	5	6	36	26	+10	32	Semi-finals	Luis Jaramillo	14	
2009 (A) I	5/10	18	10	2	6	37	24	+13	32	Could not qualify	Luis Jaramillo	11	Did not qualify because of goal differential
2009 (A) II	8/10	18	3	8	7	16	25	−9	17	Could not qualify	Gabriel Torres	5	

== Players ==
=== Current squad ===
- For Clausura 2016

Note: Flags indicate national team as defined under FIFA eligibility rules; some limited exceptions apply. Players may hold more than one non-FIFA nationality.

No.	Pos.	Nation	Player
—	GK	PAN	Eliecer Powell
—	GK	PAN	César Samudio
—	GK	PAN	Carlos Valdés
—	DF	PAN	Yordy Meléndez
—	DF	PAN	Ricardo Romero
—	DF	PAN	Luis Alberto Mendoza
—	DF	PAN	Alberto Vargas
—	DF	COL	Esteven Muñoz
—	MF	PAN	Ismael Menal
—	MF	COL	Anderson Lobón
—	MF	COL	David Pérez
—	MF	PAN	Daniel Cortina

No.	Pos.	Nation	Player
—	MF	PAN	John Paulo González
—	MF	COL	Carlos Ferreyra
—	MF	PAN	Julio Rosales
—	MF	PAN	Julio Castillo
—	MF	PAN	Pedro Jacinto Medina
—	MF	PAN	Julian Fernández O.
—	FW	PAN	Romario Piggott
—	FW	PAN	Yuriel Prestán
—	FW	PAN	José Luis González
—	FW	COL	Nelson Ortiz
—	FW	PAN	Bernardo Palma II
—	FW	PAN	Anthony Smith

=== Retired numbers ===
77 – (Panama) Jonathan Rodríguez, midfielder, 2006–09 (posthumous honour)

== Historical list of coaches ==
- (Panama) Felipe Fuentes (2005–09)
- (Panama) Víctor René Mendieta (2009–10)
- (Panama) Cesar Morales and Frank Lozada (April 2010–June 10)
- (United States) Mike Stump (June 2010–June 11)
- (Panama) Felipe Fuentes (2011)
- (United States) Mike Stump (Jan 2012–April 13)
- (Panama) Felipe Fuentes (July 2013–)
- (Panama) Jorge Santos (June 2014–)
