= Alberto Blanco (footballer) =

Panamanian footballer (born 1978)

Personal information
- Full name: Luis Alberto Blanco Saavedra
- Date of birth: 8 January 1978 (age 48)
- Place of birth: Panama City, Panama
- Height: 1.79 m (5 ft 10 in)
- Position: Midfielder

Team information
- Current team: Independiente (assistant coach)

Youth career
- 1994–1995: Marseille

Senior career*
Years	Team	Apps	(Gls)
1999–2000	Panamá Viejo		
2000–2001	San Francisco	75	(6)
2001–2005	Sheriff Tiraspol	48	(5)
2005	Alania Vladikavkaz	2	(1)
2005–2006	Al Ain	34	(3)
2006	Al-Nasr	25	(4)
2007	Plaza Amador	15	(1)
2007	San Francisco	16	(0)
2008	Atlético Junior	5	(0)
2008	San Francisco	23	(4)
2009	Maccabi Netanya	11	(1)
2009–2010	San Francisco	30	(5)
2010	Chorrillo	15	(3)
2011	Tauro		
2011–2013	Atlético Nacional		

International career
1999–2009	Panama	61	(3)

Managerial career
- 2021–2022: Universitario (assistant)
- 2022: Universitario (caretaker)
- 2022–: Independiente (assistant)
- * Club domestic league appearances and goals

Luis Alberto Blanco Saavedra (born 8 January 1978) is a Panamanian football coach and a former midfielder. He is an assistant coach with Independiente.

== Club career ==
Nicknamed Satú, he started his career at hometown club San Francisco, then moved to Europe to play in the UEFA Champions League with Moldovan champions Sheriff Tiraspol where he played alongside compatriots Ubaldo Guardia and Roberto Brown. He then had a short stint at Russian outfit Alania Vladikavkaz before moving to the Middle East where he played for UAE side Al Ain and Al-Nasr in Saudi Arabia.

After spells at Plaza Amador and San Francisco, he moved abroad again when signing for Colombians Atlético Junior in February 2008. In 2009, he joined compatriot Alberto Zapata at Israeli team Maccabi Netanya, but left them in summer 2009.

On his return to Panama, he again played for San Francisco and Chorillo and joined Tauro in January 2011. He retired at second division side Atlético Nacional in 2013.

== International career ==
Blanco made his debut for Panama in an October 1999 friendly match against Trinidad and Tobago and has earned a total of 60 caps, scoring 3 goals. He represented his country in 18 FIFA World Cup qualification matches and was a member of the 2005 CONCACAF Gold Cup team, who finished second in the tournament and he also played at the 2007 and 2009 CONCACAF Gold Cups.

His final international was a July 2009 CONCACAF Gold Cup match against Nicaragua.

=== International goals ===
Scores and results list Panama's goal tally first.

#	Date	Venue	Opponent	Score	Result	Competition
1	20 June 2004	George Odlum Stadium, Vieux Fort, Saint Lucia	Saint Lucia	3–0	3–0	2006 FIFA World Cup qualification
2	13 February 2007	Estadio Cuscatlán, San Salvador, El Salvador	Costa Rica	1–0	1–0	2007 UNCAF Nations Cup
3	22 August 2007	Estadio Rommel Fernández, Panama City, Panama	Guatemala	1–1	2–1	Friendly match

== Honours ==
=== Club ===
- Divizia Naţională (4):
  - 2001-02, 2002-03, 2003-04, 2004-05
- Moldavian Cup (1):
  - 2001-02
- UAE President Cup (1):
  - 2005-06
- Liga Panameña de Fútbol (1):
  - 2007 (C)

=== International ===
Panama

- CONCACAF Gold Cup runner-up: 2005
