= Edwin Aguilar =

Panamanian footballer (born 1985)

Personal information
- Full name: Edwin Enrique Aguilar Samaniego
- Date of birth: 7 August 1985 (age 41)
- Place of birth: Panama City, Panama
- Height: 1.86 m (6 ft 1 in)
- Position: Striker

Team information
- Current team: Tauro

Senior career*
Years	Team	Apps	(Gls)
2005–2010	Tauro	127	(62)
2007	→ Tiburones (loan)	16	(7)
2010	América de Cali	11	(6)
2010	Sporting San Miguelito	14	(7)
2011	Real Cartagena	13	(6)
2012	Tauro	27	(14)
2013–2015	Deportivo Anzoátegui	61	(36)
2015	Tauro	7	(3)
2016	Deportivo Anzoátegui	12	(3)
2016	Tauro	19	(15)
2017	Deportivo La Guaira	21	(5)
2017–2018	Tauro	52	(24)
2019	Real Cartagena	36	(17)
2020–	Tauro	13	(7)

International career
2005–	Panama	31	(7)
- * Club domestic league appearances and goals as of 12 January 2021 (UTC)

Edwin Enrique Aguilar Samaniego (born 7 August 1985) is a Panamanian professional footballer, who plays as a striker for Tauro.

== Club career ==
In August 2008, Aguilar was sent on loan to Ukrainian side Karpaty Lviv for 6 months coasting $80,000. After the loan, Tauro F.C. could sell Edwin for around $500,000. However, he missed his flight to Ukraine and was sent back to Panama.

He did, however, have spells abroad in Colombia with América de Cali, whom he left in May 2010 after being unpaid for half a year, and Real Cartagena as well as in Venezuela. Aguilar became the Venezuelan league's top goalscorer in the 2014/15 season after netting 23 times for Deportivo Anzoátegui.

Aguilar returned to Tauro in September 2015.

== International career ==
Aguilar made his debut for Panama in an October 2005 FIFA World Cup qualification match against Trinidad and Tobago and has, as of 15 March 2015, earned a total of 33 caps, scoring 10 goals. He participated in the 2005 FIFA World Youth Championship and was a member of the squad, but did not play, in the 2007 CONCACAF Gold Cup. Aguilar was also part of the team that won the 2009 UNCAF Nations Cup in Honduras.

=== International goals ===
Scores and results list Panama's goal tally first.

#	Date	Venue	Opponent	Score	Result	Competition
1.	31 January 2007	Estadio Rommel Fernández, Panama City, Panama	Trinidad and Tobago	2–1	2–1	Friendly
2.	11 August 2010	Estadio Rommel Fernández, Panama City, Panama	Venezuela	3–1	3–1	Friendly
3.	7 September 2010	Estadio Rommel Fernández, Panama City, Panama	Trinidad and Tobago	1–0	3–0	Friendly
4.	18 December 2010	Estadio Olímpico Metropolitano, San Pedro Sula, Honduras	Honduras	1–1	1–2	Friendly
5.	14 January 2011	Estadio Rommel Fernández, Panama City, Panama	Belize	2–0	2–0	2011 Copa Centroamericana
6.	18 January 2011	Estadio Rommel Fernández, Panama City, Panama	El Salvador	1–0	2–0	2011 Copa Centroamericana
7.	4 March 2020	Estadio Doroteo Guamuch Flores, Guatemala City, Guatemala	Guatemala	2–0	2–0	Friendly

== Honours ==
Panama

- UNCAF Nations Cup: 2009

Club

- Liga Panameña de Fútbol: 2007 (A)

Individual

- Liga Panameña de Fútbol Top Scorer: 2007 (A), 2009 (A)
- CONCACAF League Golden Boot (Shared): 2018
