= Amílcar Henríquez =

Panamanian footballer (1983-2017)

Personal information
- Full name: Amílcar Henríquez Espinosa
- Date of birth: August 2, 1983
- Place of birth: Colón, Panama
- Date of death: April 15, 2017 (aged 33)
- Place of death: Colón, Panama
- Height: 1.77 m (5 ft 10 in)
- Position: Defensive midfielder

Senior career*
Years	Team	Apps	(Gls)
2003–2008	Árabe Unido	119	(13)
2007	→ Santacruceña (loan)	18	(1)
2009–2012	Atlético Huila	90	(8)
2012–2014	Independiente Medellín	64	(2)
2014	Árabe Unido	12	(1)
2015	Real Cartagena	12	(0)
2015–2016	América Cali	27	(1)
2016–2017	Árabe Unido	18	(0)
Total		360	(26)

International career
2004–2017	Panama	85	(0)
- * Club domestic league appearances and goals

Amílcar Henríquez Espinosa (August 2, 1983 – April 15, 2017) was a Panamanian footballer.

== Club career ==
Born in Panama City, Henríquez began his club career with local side Árabe Unido. He spent one season with Costa Rica with Santacruceña before moving to Colombia in 2009. He became an important player for Atlético Huila and joined Independiente Medellín in July 2012. After a season back at Árabe Unido, he returned to Colombia to play for second division side Real Cartagena in December 2014.

In March 2015, Henríquez was released by Cartagena due to alleged indiscipline and in June 2015 he was snapped up by América Cali. In 2016, he returned to Árabe Unido.

== International career ==
Henríquez made his debut for Panama in a February 2005 UNCAF Nations Cup match against El Salvador and has, as of 10 June 2015, earned a total of 85 caps, scoring no goals. He represented his country in 15 FIFA World Cup qualification matches and played at the 2007, 2009 and 2011 CONCACAF Gold Cups.

His final international was a March 2017 qualification match for the 2018 FIFA World Cup against the United States.

== Death ==
On 15 April 2017, Henríquez was killed in his hometown of Colón in a drive-by shooting. He was shot while leaving his house; two other people were also injured in the incident.

Árabe Unido decided to retire his jersey #21 in his honor.

== See also ==
- List of unsolved murders (2000–present)

== Honors ==
Club

- ANAPROF (2): 2004, 2008 (C)

National team

- UNCAF Nations Cup: 1
  - Winners: 2009
  - Runner-up (1): 2007
