= Alberto Zapata =

Panamanian footballer (born 1979)

Personal information
- Full name: Alberto de Jesús Zapata Urriola
- Date of birth: February 28, 1979 (age 47)
- Place of birth: Panama City, Panama
- Height: 1.80 m (5 ft 11 in)
- Position: Forward

Team information
- Current team: Atlético Nacional
- Number: 9

Senior career*
| Years | Team | Apps | (Gls) |
| 1999 | Real España | | |
| 1999 | Vida | | |
| 2000–2002 | Tauro | | |
| 2001 | Tecos UAG | 20 | (16) |
| 2002 | Chorrillo | | |
| 2003 | Alianza (Panama) | | |
| 2004 | Olimpia Asunción | | |
| 2005 | Municipal Valencia | | |
| 2005 | Alianza (Panama) | | |
| 2006 | San Francisco | | |
| 2007 | Puerto Rico Islanders | 17 | (4) |
| 2008 | San Francisco | 37 | (25) |
| 2009 | Maccabi Netanya | 11 | (1) |
| 2009 | Alianza (El Salvador) | 10 | (1) |
| 2010 | San Francisco | 19 | (5) |
| 2010–2012 | Sporting San Miguelito | 29 | (9) |
| 2013–2015 | Atlético Nacional | | |

International career^{‡}
| 2000–2009 | Panama | 15 | (2) |
- * Club domestic league appearances and goals as of 28 September 2008 ‡ National team caps and goals as of October 20, 2008

Alberto de Jesús Zapata Urriola (born 28 February 1979) is a retired professional Panamanian football forward who played for last time in Atlético Nacional.

== Club career ==
A much-travelled striker or attacking midfielder, Zapata played alongside compatriot Roberto Brown for Honduran side Real España in 1999 and left fellow Hondurans Vida in December 1999 after claiming the club had not paid him his wages. In 2001, he played for Mexican second division side Tecos UAG, for whom he rattled in 16 goals in 20 games. He later joined Chorrillo from Tauro in his native Panama in summer 2002 and moved to Alianza in 2003, winning the Panamanian league's MVP award 2003 in the process.

In January 2004 he moved abroad again to play for Paraguayan giants Olimpia and returned to Honduras in January 2005 when recommended to Municipal Valencia by Víctor René Mendieta.

He returned to Panama in 2005 to play for Alianza again and from 2006 for San Francisco and played with fellow Panamanians Víctor Herrera Piggott and Gustavo Ávila at Puerto Rican outfit Puerto Rico Islanders in 2007. In January 2009 he went to Europe for a spell alongside Alberto Blanco in Israel with Lothar Matthäus-led Maccabi Netanya and scored his first goal for them in April 2009 against Hapoel Petah Tikva. In July 2009 he signed with Salvadoran side Alianza, only to leave them in November 2009 after an unsuccessful spell at the club.

After another stint at San Francisco he moved to Sporting San Miguelito in summer 2010 and later joined then second division side Atlético Nacional. In June 2015 he clinched promotion to the LPF after his team Atlético Nacional won the Panamanian Second Division championship decider against SUNTRACS with Zapata scoring one of the goals.

== International career ==
Zapata made his debut for Panama in a January 2000 friendly match against Guatemala and has earned a total of 15 caps, scoring 2 goals. He represented his country in two qualifying matches for the 2002 FIFA World Cup and four qualifying matches for the 2006 FIFA World Cup.

His final international was a January 2009 UNCAF Nations Cup match against Guatemala.

=== International goals ===
Scores and results list. Panama's goal tally first.

| # | Date | Venue | Opponent | Score | Result | Competition |
|---|---|---|---|---|---|---|
| 1. | June 21, 2000 | Estadio Rommel Fernández, Panama City, Panama | Venezuela | 2–0 | 2–0 | Friendly |
| 2. | January 27, 2009 | Estadio Tiburcio Carias Andino, Tegucigalpa, Honduras | Guatemala | 1–0 | 1–0 | 2009 UNCAF Nations Cup |
