= Carlos Rivera (Panamanian footballer) =

Panamanian footballer (born 1979)

Personal information
- Full name: Carlos Rubén Rivera Moulton
- Date of birth: May 30, 1979 (age 47)
- Place of birth: Panama City, Panama
- Height: 1.83 m (6 ft 0 in)
- Position: Defender

Senior career*
Years	Team	Apps	(Gls)
2003	Árabe Unido		
2004	San Francisco		
2005	Independiente Medellín	17	(1)
2005–2006	Persepolis	15	(2)
2006–2007	San Francisco	9	(0)
2007	Tauro	22	(6)
2008–2010	San Francisco	72	(5)
2010–	Marquense		
2011–2012	Sporting San Miguelito	13	(1)
2012–2013	Millenium UP		

International career^{‡}
2004–2010	Panama	63	(2)

Managerial career
- 2014–: Millenium UP (assistant)
- * Club domestic league appearances and goals as of 16:55, 21 March 2009 (UTC) ‡ National team caps and goals as of 16:55, 21 March 2009 (UTC)

Carlos Rubén Rivera Moulton (born 30 May 1979) is a retired Panamanian football defender.

== Club career ==
Rivera played for several Panamanian clubs but also had spells abroad with Colombian club Independiente Medellín and Iranian side Persepolis, whom he joined in 2005 alongside compatriot José Anthony Torres.

In January 2011 Rivera moved to Sporting San Miguelito. In December 2012, he won the 2012 Apertura championship of the Panamanian second division with Millenium UP but he missed out on promotion after losing the Super Final to 2013 Clausura winners Independiente.

== International career ==
Rivera made his debut for Panama in a March 2004 friendly match against Cuba and has earned a total of 63 caps, scoring 2 goals. He represented his country in 15 FIFA World Cup qualification matches and was a member of the 2005 CONCACAF Gold Cup team, who finished second in the tournament and he also played at the 2007 and 2009 CONCACAF Gold Cups. During the 2007 CONCACAF Gold Cup Group C opener against Honduras, Rivera scored his first ever international goal for Panama.

His final international was a November 2010 friendly match against Honduras.

=== International goals ===
Scores and results list Panama's goal tally first.

#	Date	Venue	Opponent	Score	Result	Competition
1	11 February 2007	Estadio Cuscatlán, San Salvador, El Salvador	Honduras	1–1	1–1	2007 UNCAF Nations Cup
2	8 June 2007	Giants Stadium, East Rutherford, United States	Honduras	1–0	3–2	2007 CONCACAF Gold Cup

== Managerial career ==
After retiring, he became assistant coach at Millenium UP in September 2014.

== Honours ==
Panama

- CONCACAF Gold Cup runner-up: 2005
