= Estadio San Cristóbal =

Coordinates: 8°25′13″N 82°26′33″W

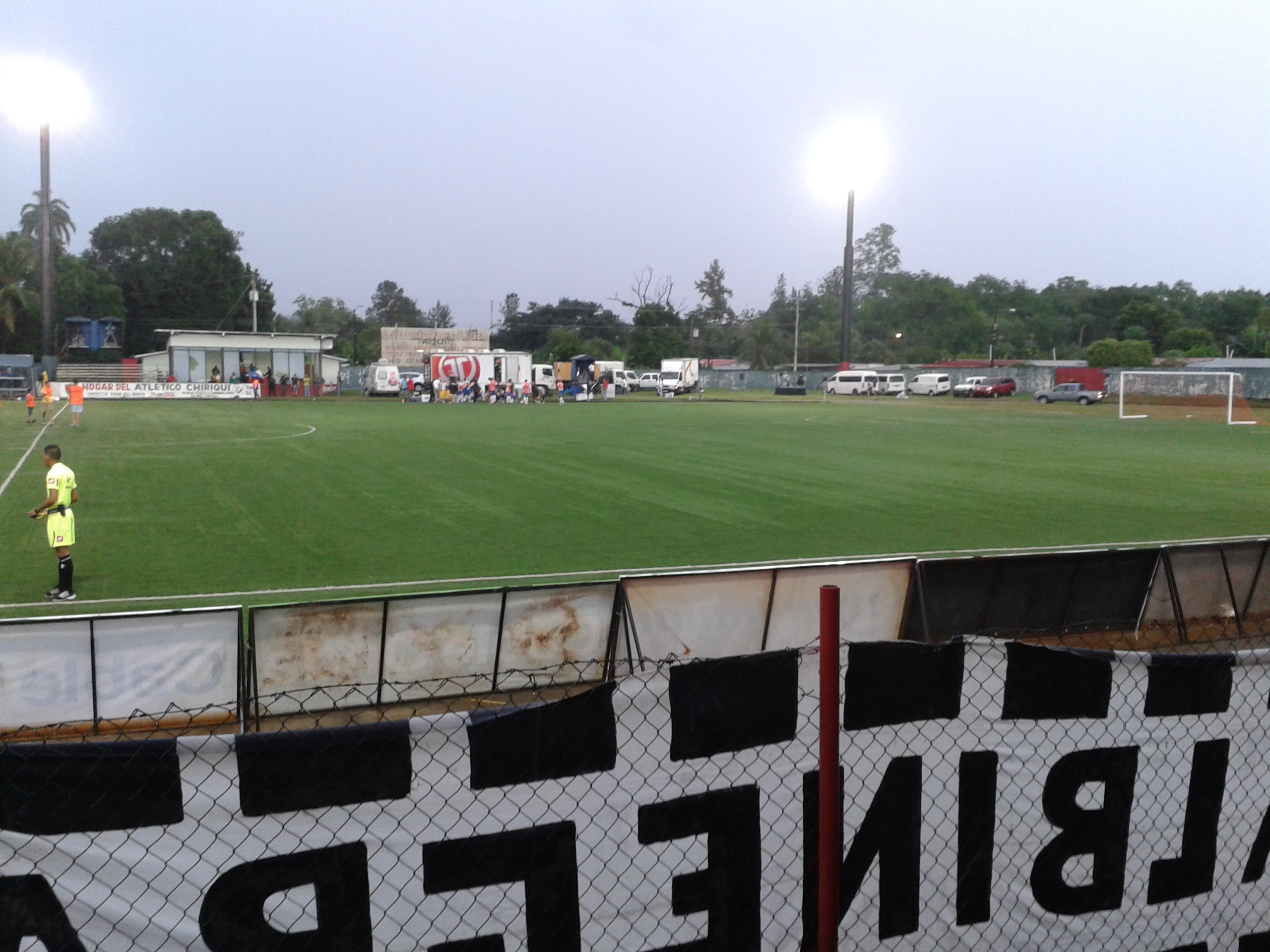
- Interactive map of Estadio San Cristóbal
- Location: Chiriquí, Panama
- Capacity: 2500
- Surface: Artificial turf
- Field size: 105x68m

Construction
- Opened: 1999
- Renovated: 2008, 2018

Tenant
- Atlético Chiriquí

Estadio San Cristóbal is a stadium in Chiriquí Province, Panama. It is currently used mostly for football matches and is the home stadium of Atlético Chiriquí.
