= Estadio Armando Dely Valdés =

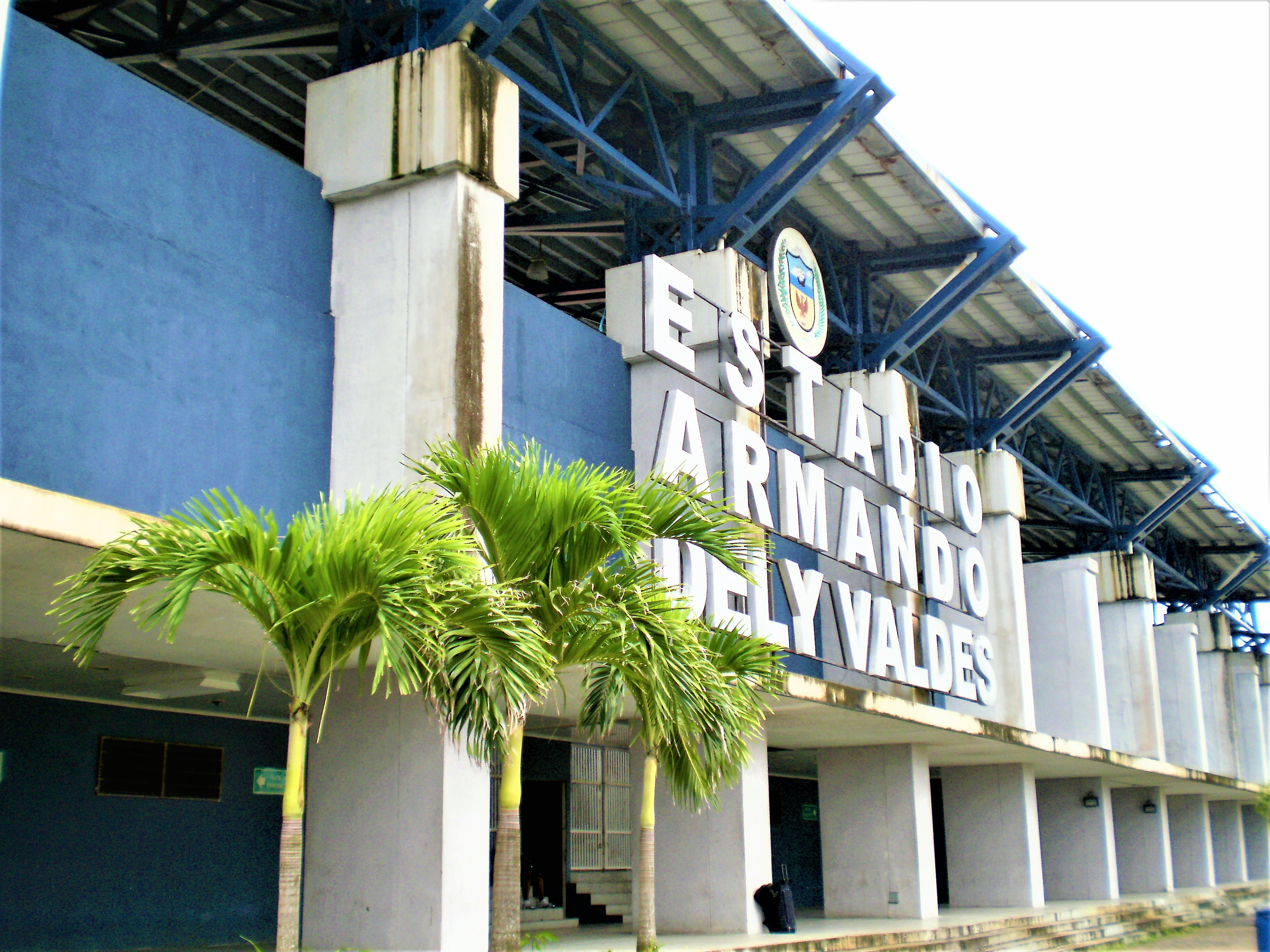
- Interactive map of Estadio Armando Dely Valdés
- Location: Colon, Panama
- Coordinates: 9.344049°N 79.89584°W
- Capacity: 4,000
- Surface: Artificial turf
- Field size: 105x68m

Construction
- Opened: 1970
- Renovated: 2007, 2014
- Architect: Octavio Méndez Guardia

Tenant
- Árabe Unido

Estadio Armando Dely Valdés is a multi-purpose stadium in Colón, Panama.

== Description ==
Estadio Armando Dely Valdés is a multi-purpose stadium located in Colón, Panama.

It is currently used mostly for football matches and is the home stadium of CD Árabe Unido.
