= Atlético Veragüense =

- Full name: Club Atlético Veragüense
- Nicknames: El submarino amarillo Los indios Hijos de Urracá
- Founded: 1996
- Ground: Estadio Aristocles Castillo; Santiago de Veraguas, Panama
- Capacity: 2,000
- Chairman: Rafael Sanjur
- Manager: (Colombia) Andrés Domínguez
- League: Liga Panameña de Fútbol
- -: -
Home colours	Away colours

Atlético Veragüense is a Panamanian football team playing in the Liga Panameña de Fútbol. It is based in Santiago de Veraguas in Veraguas province. Its home stadium is Estadio Aristocles Castillo. The team was previously known as La Primavera.

== History ==
In 2002, La Primavera beat Expreso Bocas (from the Bocas del Toro Province) 2–1 to earn promotion to the Liga Panameña de Fútbol for the first time.

In 2003, the team was renamed Atlético Veragüense. Under their new name, they lasted in the top flight until Clausura 2011, when they were relegated.

They returned after Clausura 2016, replacing Chepo F.C. (which had folded).

== Honours ==
- Liga Nacional de Ascenso: 1

2002

== Historical list of coaches ==
- (Colombia) Virgilio Rodríguez (2005–2006)
- (Panama) José Alfredo Poyatos (2006)
- (Colombia) Virgilio Rodríguez (2007–2009)
- (Costa Rica) Roger Gómez (Oct 2009–2010)
- (Colombia) Eduardo Flores (Apr 2010–)
- (Panama) Marcos Pimentel (June 2016 - August 2016)
- (Colombia) Andrés Domínguez (September 2016 - June 2017)
- (Colombia) Edgar Ramírez (June 2017 - )
- (Panama) Marcos Pimentel (December 2017 - March 2018)
- (Colombia) Javier Reales (March 2018 - )
