= Alexander González (footballer, born 1994) =

Panamanian footballer

Personal information
- Full name: Alexander González Moreno
- Date of birth: 14 December 1994 (age 31)
- Place of birth: Panama
- Height: 1.80 m (5 ft 11 in)
- Position: Midfielder

Team information
- Current team: UCV
- Number: 30

Senior career*
Years	Team	Apps	(Gls)
2012–2013	Río Abajo	24	(0)
2013	San Miguelito	9	(0)
2014	Río Abajo	8	(2)
2015	Independiente	12	(1)
2015	Alianza	9	(2)
2016–2017	Plaza Amador	42	(0)
2017	Aragua	16	(0)
2018	Jaguares de Córdoba	4	(0)
2018–2019	Plaza Amador	30	(0)
2019	Pacific FC	20	(0)
2020	San Miguelito	5	(0)
2020	Alianza	9	(1)
2021	San Francisco	8	(0)
2021–22	Herrera	25	(1)
2022	Alianza	15	(0)
2023	Hermanos Colmenarez	7	(0)
2023	Cúcuta Deportivo	22	(0)
2024–	UCV	67	(0)

International career^{‡}
2011	Panama U17	11	(0)
2013	Panama U20	5	(1)
2020–	Panama	1	(0)
- * Club domestic league appearances and goals as of 10 March 2026 ‡ National team caps and goals as of 11 October 2020

Alexander González Moreno (born 14 December 1994) is a Panamanian professional footballer who plays for UCV as a midfielder.

== Club career ==
=== Pacific FC ===
On 17 May 2019, González signed with Canadian Premier League side Pacific FC. On 23 May 2019, he made his debut for Pacific in a 2–1 loss to Cavalry FC in the Canadian Championship.

=== San Miguelito ===
On 29 January 2020, González signed with Liga Panameña side Sporting San Miguelito.

== International career ==
González debuted with the Panama national team in a friendly 1-0 win over Costa Rica on 10 October 2020.

== Career statistics ==
As of 19 October 2019

Appearances and goals by club, season and competition
Club	Season	League			National Cup		Continental		Other^{[A]}		Total	
Club	Season	Division	Apps	Goals	Apps	Goals	Apps	Goals	Apps	Goals	Apps	Goals
Río Abajo	2012–13	Liga Panameña	24	0	—	—	—	—	2	0	26	0
San Miguelito	2013–14	Liga Panameña	9	0	—	—	2	0	—	—	11	0
Río Abajo	2013–14	Liga Panameña	8	2	—	—	—	—	3	0	11	2
Independiente	2014–15	Liga Panameña	12	1	—	—	—	—	3	0	15	1
Alianza	2015–16	Liga Panameña	9	2	0	0	—	—	—	—	9	2
Plaza Amador	2015–16	Liga Panameña	14	0	0	0	—	—	2	0	16	0
Plaza Amador	2016–17	Liga Panameña	28	0	0	0	4	0	5	0	37	0
Plaza Amador	Total		42	0	0	0	4	0	7	0	53	0
Aragua	2017	Venezuelan Primera División	16	0	4	0	—	—	—	—	20	0
Jaguares de Córdoba	2018	Categoría Primera A	4	0	0	0	0	0	—	—	4	0
Plaza Amador	2018–19	Liga Panameña	30	0	0	0	—	—	1	0	31	0
Pacific FC	2019	Canadian Premier League	20	0	1	0	—	—	0	0	21	0
San Miguelito	2019–20	Liga Panameña	5	0	—	—	0	0	—	—	5	0
Career total			179	5	5	0	6	0	16	0	206	5

A. The "Other" column includes appearances and goals in the Liga Panameña de Fútbol Playoffs.

== Honours ==
Plaza Amador

- Liga Panameña de Fútbol Clausura: 2015–16
