= Orlando Mosquera =

Panamanian footballer (born 1994)

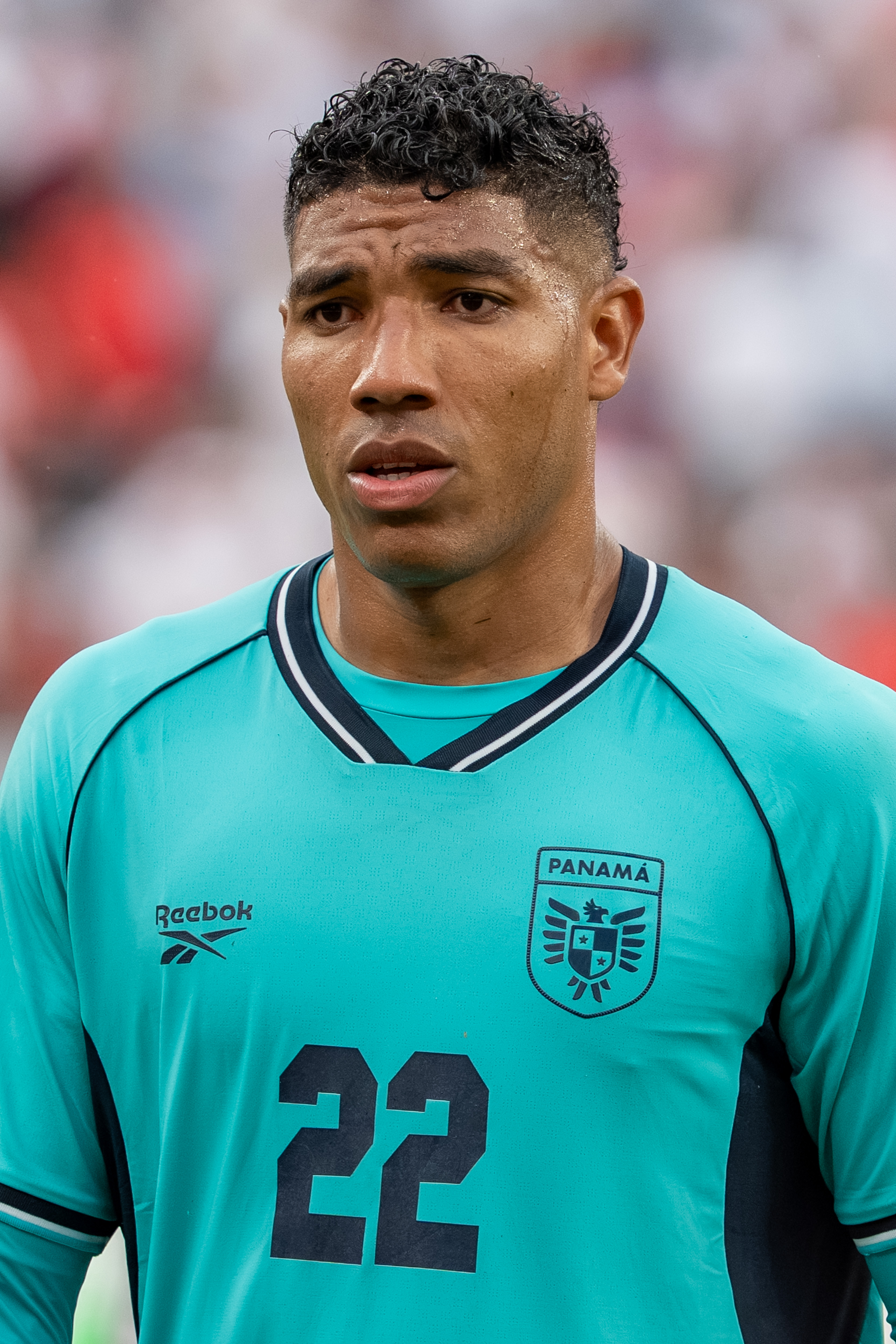
- Mosquera with Panama in 2026

Personal information
- Date of birth: 25 December 1994 (age 31)
- Place of birth: San Miguelito, Panama
- Height: 1.91 m (6 ft 3 in)
- Position: Goalkeeper

Team information
- Current team: Al-Fayha
- Number: 52

Senior career*
Years	Team	Apps	(Gls)
2012–2017	Sporting San Miguelito	70	(1)
2017–2020	Tauro	64	(0)
2020–2021	Boluspor	32	(0)
2021	Always Ready	19	(0)
2022	Carabobo	29	(0)
2023	Monagas	17	(0)
2023–2024	Maccabi Tel Aviv	9	(0)
2024–	Al-Fayha	69	(0)

International career^{‡}
2020–	Panama	52	(0)
Medal record
Men's football
Representing Panama
CONCACAF Gold Cup
Runner-up	2023 United States–Canada
CONCACAF Nations League
Runner-up	2025 United States
- * Club domestic league appearances and goals as of 13 September 2026 ‡ National team caps and goals as of 1 October 2026

Orlando Mosquera (born 25 December 1994), commonly known as Kuty Mosquera, is a Panamanian professional footballer who plays as a goalkeeper for Saudi Pro League club Al-Fayha and the Panama national team.

== Club career ==
On 1 November 2015, Mosquera scored to tie Tauro 2-2 during the 90th minute. After that, he played for Tauro, helping them win the 2017 Panamanian top flight Clasura as well as the 2018 and 2019 Aperturas.

For the second half of 2019/20, he signed for Boluspor in the Turkish second division. In 2021, he signed for Always Ready. In 2022, he signed for Carabobo. In early 2023, he signed for Monagas and after a successful Gold Cup for Panama in the summer of that year, he got a move to Maccabi Tel Aviv in the later stages of the summer 2023 transfer window.

== Career statistics ==
=== Club ===
As of match played 13 September 2026

Appearances and goals by club, season and competition
Club	Season	League			National Cup		Continental		Total	
Club	Season	Division	Apps	Goals	Apps	Goals	Apps	Goals	Apps	Goals
Sporting San Miguelito	2012–13	Liga LPF	1	0	–		–		1	0
Sporting San Miguelito	2013–14	Liga LPF	0	0	0	0	0	0	0	0
Sporting San Miguelito	2014–15	Liga LPF	28	0	0	0	–		28	0
Sporting San Miguelito	2015–16	Liga LPF	25	1	0	0	–		25	1
Sporting San Miguelito	2016–17	Liga LPF	16	0	0	0	–		16	0
Sporting San Miguelito	Total		70	1	0	0	0	0	70	1
Tauro	2016–17	Liga LPF	10	0	–		–		10	0
Tauro	2017–18	Liga LPF	22	0	0	0	–		22	0
Tauro	2018–19	Liga LPF	32	0	0	0	2 (Note: Appearance(s) in the Copa Libertadores)	0	34	0
Tauro	2019–20	Liga LPF	14	0	0	0	0	0	14	0
Tauro	Total		78	0	0	0	2	0	80	0
Boluspor	2019–20	Süper Lig	16	0	0	0	–		16	0
Boluspor	2020–21	Süper Lig	16	0	0	0	–		16	0
Boluspor	Total		32	0	0	0	–		32	0
Always Ready	2021	FBF División Profesional	19	0	0	0	–		19	0
Carabobo	2022	Liga FUTVE	29	0	0	0	–		29	0
Monagas	2023	Liga FUTVE	17	0	0	0	5	0	22	0
Maccabi Tel Aviv	2023–24	Israeli Premier League	9	0	0	0	4	0	13	0
Al-Fayha	2024–25	Saudi Pro League	30	0	2	0	—		32	0
Al-Fayha	2025–26	Saudi Pro League	32	0	1	0	—		33	0
Al-Fayha	2026–27	Saudi Pro League	7	0	1	0	—		8	0
Al-Fayha	Total		69	0	4	0	—		73	0
Career total			330	1	4	0	4	0	338	1

=== International ===
As of match played 1 October 2026

Appearances and goals by national team and year
National team	Year	Apps	Goals
Panama	2020	2	0
Panama	2021	2	0
Panama	2022	5	0
Panama	2023	12	0
Panama	2024	11	0
Panama	2025	12	0
Panama	2026	8	0
Total		52	0

== Honours ==
Tauro

- Liga LPF: Apertura 2018

Maccabi Tel Aviv

- Israeli Premier League: 2023–24
- Toto Cup: 2023–24

Panama

- CONCACAF Gold Cup runner-up: 2023
- CONCACAF Nations League runner-up: 2024–25

Individual

- Saudi Pro League Goalkeeper of the Month: February 2025, March 2025
