= Cristian Martínez (Panamanian footballer) =

Panamanian footballer (born 1997)

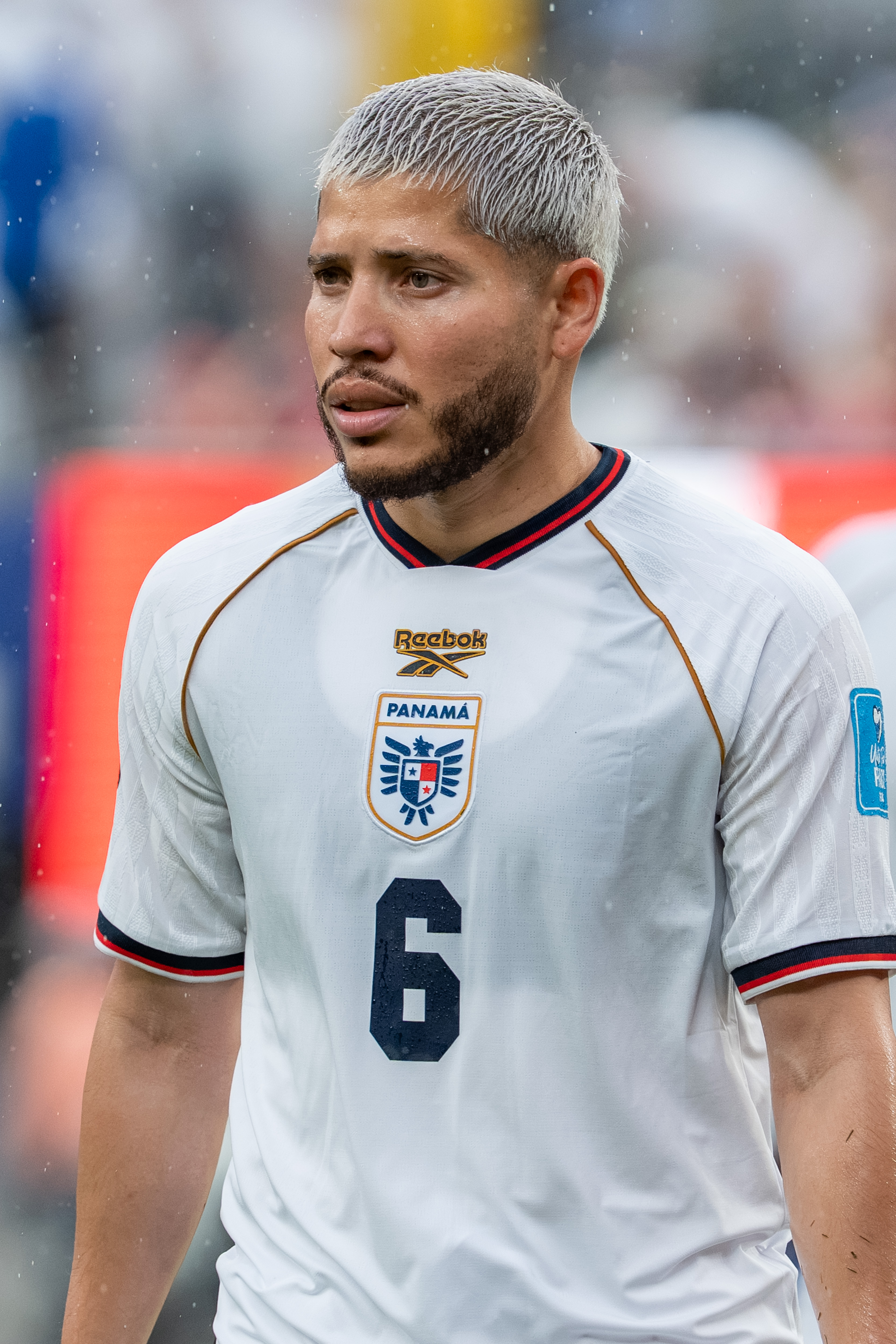
- Martínez with Panama in 2026

Personal information
- Full name: Cristian Jesús Martínez
- Date of birth: 6 February 1997 (age 29)
- Place of birth: Panama City, Panama
- Height: 1.70 m (5 ft 7 in)
- Position: Midfielder

Team information
- Current team: Slovan Bratislava
- Number: 70

Youth career
- 2005–2013: Chorrillo

Senior career*
Years	Team	Apps	(Gls)
2013–2017	Chorrillo	37	(3)
2016	→ Columbus Crew (loan)	5	(1)
2016	→ Pittsburgh Riverhounds (loan)	8	(0)
2017–2018	Columbus Crew	22	(0)
2017	→ FC Cincinnati (loan)	1	(0)
2019	Chicago Fire	5	(0)
2019	→ Las Vegas Lights (loan)	9	(2)
2020–2023	Cádiz B	1	(0)
2020	→ Recreativo de Huelva (loan)	4	(0)
2021	→ Plaza Amador (loan)	30	(2)
2022–2023	→ Monagas (loan)	29	(0)
2023	Najran	16	(0)
2023–2025	Plaza Amador	4	(0)
2023–2024	→ Al-Jandal (loan)	28	(7)
2024–2025	→ Ironi Kiryat Shmona (loan)	33	(1)
2025–2026	Ironi Kiryat Shmona	31	(4)
2026–	Slovan Bratislava	8	(0)

International career^{‡}
2017	Panama U20	5	(0)
2016–	Panama	71	(2)
Medal record
Men's football
Representing Panama
CONCACAF Gold Cup
Runner-up	2023 United States–Canada	Team
CONCACAF Nations League
Runner-up	2025 United States	Team
- * Club domestic league appearances and goals as of 20:02, 31 October 2026 (UTC) ‡ National team caps and goals as of 17:24, 5 October 2026 (UTC)

Cristian Jesús Martínez (born 6 February 1997) is a Panamanian professional footballer who plays as a midfielder for Niké Liga club Slovan Bratislava and the Panama national team.

== Club career ==
=== Chorrillo ===
Martínez joined the youth team of his local side Chorrillo at the age of 8, eventually joining the club's first team in 2012.

=== Columbus Crew ===
Martínez signed on loan with Major League Soccer side Columbus Crew on 17 May 2016. Martínez made his MLS debut on June 1, 2016, coming on as a substitute in a 3–2 loss to Philadelphia Union. He scored in the 90+3', becoming the youngest Crew SC goal scorer in a regular-season match in club history. Martínez would be loaned by Crew SC to Pittsburgh Riverhounds, the club's USL affiliate. He made his Riverhounds debut against FC Montreal on 10 August 2016. Crew SC would recall Martínez for two more appearances at the end of the MLS season. On 25 January, Martínez was acquired on a permanent transfer. On May 4, 2017, Martínez was loaned to United Soccer League club FC Cincinnati. He played in one game before returning to the Columbus Crew on May 8.

=== Chicago Fire ===
On 12 December 2018, Martínez was selected by Chicago Fire in the MLS Waiver Draft.

On 24 August 2019, Martínez joined USL Championship side Las Vegas Lights on loan for the remainder of the season.

=== Cádiz ===
On January 18, 2020, Cádiz CF announced his signing until 2022 and that he would be loaned to a Segunda División B team. On January 24 it was made official that that team would be Recreativo de Huelva.

On January 30, 2021, Cádiz CF announced his six-month loan to CD Plaza Amador of Panama.

=== Najran ===
On 20 January 2023, Martínez joined Saudi Arabian club Najran.

=== Plaza Amador ===
On 26 July 2023, Martínez joined Plaza Amador.

=== Al-Jandal ===
On 16 September 2023, Martínez joined Saudi Arabian club Al-Jandal.

=== Ironi Kiryat Shmona ===
On 13 July 2024 signed for the Israeli club Ironi Kiryat Shmona.

== International career ==
In May 2018 he was named in Panama's preliminary 35 man squad for the 2018 World Cup in Russia. However, he did not make the final 23. Martínez eventually played the 2026 FIFA World Cup, with Panama having two games in Canada and one in the United States. He was chosen as Player of the Match in the defeat to Croatia.

== Career statistics ==
=== Club ===
As of match played 3 November 2026

Appearances and goals by club, season and competition
Club	Season	League			National cup		Continental		Other		Total	
Club	Season	Division	Apps	Goals	Apps	Goals	Apps	Goals	Apps	Goals	Apps	Goals
Chorrillo	2013–14	Liga LPF	5	0	0	0	—		—		5	0
Chorrillo	2014–15	Liga LPF	1	0	0	0	—		—		1	0
Chorrillo	2015–16	Liga LPF	31	3	0	0	—		—		31	3
Chorrillo	Total		37	3	0	0	—		—		37	3
Columbus Crew (loan)	2016	Major League Soccer	5	1	2	0	0	0	0	0	7	1
Pittsburgh Riverhounds (loan)	2016	Major League Soccer	8	0	0	0	—		—		8	0
Columbus Crew	2017	Major League Soccer	8	0	0	0	0	0	0	0	8	0
Columbus Crew	2018	Major League Soccer	15	0	1	0	0	0	0	0	16	0
Columbus Crew	Total		22	0	1	0	0	0	0	0	23	0
FC Cincinnati (loan)	2017	Major League Soccer	1	0	0	0	—		—		1	0
Chicago Fire	2019–20	Major League Soccer	5	0	0	0	—		0	0	5	0
Las Vegas Lights (loan)	2020	USL Championship	9	2	0	0	—		—		9	2
Recreativo Huelva (loan)	2019–20	Segunda División B	4	0	—		—		—		4	0
Cádiz B	2020–21	Segunda División B	1	0	—		—		—		1	0
Plaza Amador (loan)	2021	Liga Panameña de Fútbol	30	2	0	0	2 (Note: Appearances in Copa Libertadores)	0	—		32	2
Monagas (loan)	2022	Venezuelan Primera División	29	0	—		2	0	—		31	0
Plaza Amador	2023	Liga Panameña de Fútbol	4	0	—		—		—		4	0
Najran	2022–23	Saudi First Division League	16	0	0	0	—		—		16	0
Al Jandal	2023–24	Saudi First Division League	28	7	—		—		—		28	7
Ironi Kiryat Shmona (loan)	2024–25	Israeli Premier League	33	1	1	0	—		5 (Note: Appearance in Israel State Cup)	0	40	1
Ironi Kiryat Shmona	2025–26	Israeli Premier League	31	4	2	0	—		0	0	33	4
Slovan Bratislava	2026–27	Slovak First Football League	9	0	1	0	9 (Note: Appearances in UEFA Champions League)	1	—		19	1
Career total			273	20	7	0	13	1	5	0	298	21

=== International ===
As of match played 5 October 2026

Appearances and goals by national team and year
National team	Year	Apps	Goals
Panama	2016	2	0
Panama	2018	5	0
Panama	2021	4	0
Panama	2022	12	0
Panama	2023	14	0
Panama	2024	13	1
Panama	2025	11	1
Panama	2026	10	0
Total		71	2

=== International goals ===
No.	Date	Venue	Opponent	Score	Result	Competition
1.	6 June 2024	Estadio Rommel Fernández, Panama City, Panama	Guyana	1–0	2–0	2026 FIFA World Cup qualification
2.	16 June 2025	Dignity Health Sports Park, Carson, United States	Guadeloupe	1–0	5–2	2025 CONCACAF Gold Cup

== Honours ==
Panama

- CONCACAF Gold Cup runner-up: 2023
- CONCACAF Nations League runner-up: 2024–25
