= Romeesh Ivey =

Panamanian football player (born 1994)

Personal information
- Full name: Romeesh Nathaniel Ivey Belgravey
- Date of birth: July 14, 1994 (age 32)
- Place of birth: Arraiján, Panama
- Height: 1.67 m (5 ft 6 in)
- Position: Winger

Team information
- Current team: Estudiantes de Mérida
- Number: 14

Senior career*
Years	Team	Apps	(Gls)
2012–2018	Alianza	120	(16)
2018–2022	C.A. Independiente	39	(9)
2019	→ Deportivo Pasto (loan)	13	(1)
2020	→ Alianza Petrolera (loan)	8	(1)
2021–2022	→ Etar (loan)	9	(0)
2022	→ Etar (loan)	30	(6)
2022–2025	Spartak Varna	77	(10)
2025–2026	Botev Vratsa	15	(0)
2026–	Estudiantes de Mérida	3	(0)

International career^{‡}
2021–	Panama	2	(0)
- * Club domestic league appearances and goals as of 06:50, 18 February 2026 (UTC) ‡ National team caps and goals as of 06:53, 29 September 2022 (UTC)

Romeesh Ivey (born 14 July 1994) is a Panamanian professional football midfielder who currently plays for Estudiantes de Mérida and the Panama national team.

== Club career ==
=== Alianza ===
Ivey began his professional football career at Alianza in Panama City.

=== Independiente ===
On 19 February 2019, Ivey scored two goals in a 4–0 CONCACAF Champions League Round of 16 victory against Toronto FC. It was the first win in international football for Independiente. Ivey spend 2 loan seasons with the Bulgarian Etar.

=== Spartak Varna ===
On 6 June 2022 Ivey joined the newly promoted to the Bulgarian First League team Spartak Varna, signing a 3-year long contract deal.

== International career ==
He made his debut for Panama national football team on 28 January 2021 in a friendly game against Serbia. He substituted Misael Acosta in the 58th minute.

== Career statistics ==
As of 6 October 2024

Club	Season	League			Cup		Continental		Other		Total	
Club	Season	Division	Apps	Goals	Apps	Goals	Apps	Goals	Apps	Goals	Apps	Goals
Alianza	2012–13	Liga Panameña de Fútbol	11	0	0	0	—		—		11	0
Alianza	2013–14	Liga Panameña de Fútbol	32	5	0	0	—		—		32	5
Alianza	2014–15	Liga Panameña de Fútbol	29	4	0	0	—		—		29	4
Alianza	2015–16	Liga Panameña de Fútbol	11	1	0	0	—		—		11	1
Alianza	2016–17	Liga Panameña de Fútbol	9	1	0	0	—		—		9	1
Alianza	2017–18	Liga Panameña de Fútbol	28	5	0	0	—		—		28	5
Alianza	Total		120	16	0	0	0	0	0	0	120	16
Independiente	2017–18	Liga Panameña de Fútbol	17	3	0	0	—		—		17	3
Independiente	2018–19	Liga Panameña de Fútbol	19	6	0	0	4	3	—		23	9
Independiente	2021–22	Liga Panameña de Fútbol	3	0	0	0	—		—		3	0
Independiente	Total		39	9	0	0	4	3	0	0	43	12
Deportivo Pasto (loan)	2019	Categoría Primera A	13	1	4	1	—		—		17	2
Alianza Petrolera (loan)	2020	Categoría Primera A	8	1	3	0	—		—		11	1
Etar Veliko Tarnovo (loan)	2020–21	First League	9	0	0	0	—		—		9	0
Etar Veliko Tarnovo (loan)	2021–22	Second League	30	6	0	0	—		1	0	30	6
Etar Veliko Tarnovo (loan)	Total		39	6	0	0	0	0	1	0	39	6
Spartak Varna	2022–23	First League	23	1	3	0	—		—		26	1
Spartak Varna	2023–24	Second League	28	6	2	0	—		—		30	6
Spartak Varna	2024–25	First League	26	3	2	1	—		—		28	4
Spartak Varna	Total		77	10	7	1	0	0	0	0	84	11
Botev Vratsa	2025–26	First League	0	0	0	0	—		—		0	0
Career total			296	41	14	2	4	3	1	0	315	46
