= Jorman Aguilar =

Panamanian footballer (born 1994)

Personal information
- Full name: Jorman Israel Aguilar Bustamante
- Date of birth: 11 September 1994 (age 32)
- Place of birth: Panama City, Panama
- Height: 1.81 m (5 ft 11 in)
- Position: Striker

Team information
- Current team: Municipal Pérez Zeledón
- Number: 17

Senior career*
Years	Team	Apps	(Gls)
2012–2013	Río Abajo	18	(10)
2013–2015	Parma	0	(0)
2013	→ Nova Gorica (loan)	1	(0)
2014	→ Istra (loan)	4	(0)
2014–2015	→ Olhanense (loan)	8	(1)
2015	Independiente Chorrera	16	(2)
2015–2016	Tauro	20	(3)
2016–2017	Olhanense	40	(11)
2017–2018	Estoril	15	(0)
2018–2019	Independiente Chorrera	48	(13)
2020	San Carlos	31	(14)
2021	Sport Boys	7	(1)
2021	San Carlos	20	(7)
2022	Bucheon FC 1995	29	(4)
2023–2024	Comunicaciones	31	(4)
2025–	Municipal Pérez Zeledón	1	(0)

International career^{‡}
2011	Panama U17	11	(2)
2013	Panama U20	1	(0)
2015–	Panama	9	(1)
- * Club domestic league appearances and goals as of 28 July 2025 ‡ National team caps and goals as of 28 July 2025

Jorman Israel Aguilar Bustamante (born 11 September 1994) is a Panamanian professional footballer who plays as a striker.

== Club career ==
Born in Panama City, Aguilar made his senior debuts with hometown's Río Abajo, and after netting ten times in only 18 matches he joined Italian Serie A side Parma. However, in July he was loaned to Nova Gorica.

On 27 July 2013, Aguilar made his professional debut, playing the last 30 minutes in a 2–1 home loss against Domžale. On 11 February of the following year he moved teams and countries again, joining Istra 1961 also in a temporary deal.

In January 2015 he was signed by Independiente Chorrera.

In 2022, he joined Bucheon FC 1995 of K League 2. He left the club at the end of the season.

== International career ==
Aguilar made his debut for Panama in a March 2015 friendly match against Trinidad and Tobago.

== Career statistics ==
=== Club ===
As of match played 9 September 2024

Appearances and goals by club, season and competition
Club	Season	League			National cup		Continental		Other		Total	
Club	Season	Division	Apps	Goals	Apps	Goals	Apps	Goals	Apps	Goals	Apps	Goals
Río Abajo	2012-13	Liga Panameña de Fútbol	18	10	—		—		—		18	10
Nova Gorica (loan)	2013-14	1. SNL	1	0	2	0	—		—		3	0
Istra (loan)	2013-14	HNL	0	0	0	0	—		—		0	0
Olhanense (loan)	2014-15	Segunda Liga	8	1	—		—		1 (Note: Appearance(s) in Taça da Liga)	1	9	2
Independiente Chorrera	2014-15	Liga Panameña de Fútbol	16	2	—		—		—		16	2
Tauro	2015-16	Liga Panameña de Fútbol	20	3	—		—		—		20	3
Olhanense	2016-17	LigaPro	40	11	1	0	—		1	0	42	11
Estoril	2017-18	Primeira Liga	15	0	—		—		1	0	16	0
Independiente Chorrera	2018-19	Liga Panameña de Fútbol	17	8	—		3 (Note: Appearance(s) in CONCACAF Champions Cup)	1	—		20	9
Independiente Chorrera	2019-20	Liga Panameña de Fútbol	15	3	—		4 (Note: Appearance(s) in CONCACAF League)	1	—		19	4
Independiente Chorrera	Total		32	11	—		7	2	—		39	13
San Carlos	2019-20	Liga FPD	20	11	—		2	1	—		22	12
San Carlos	2020-21	Liga FPD	11	3	—		—		—		11	3
San Carlos	Total		31	14	—		2	1	—		33	15
Sport Boys	2021	Peruvian Primera División	7	1	—		—		—		7	1
San Carlos	2021-22	Liga FPD	18	7	—		—		—		18	7
Bucheon	2022	K League 2	29	4	2	0	—		—		31	4
Zamora	2023	Venezuelan Primera División	8	0	—		2 (Note: Appearance(s) in Copa Libertadores)	0	—		10	0
Comunicaciones	2023-24	Liga Nacional de Guatemala	31	4	—		9 (Note: Seven appearances, three goals in CONCACAF Central American Cup, Two appearances in CONCACAF Champions Cup)	3	—		40	7
Independiente Chorrera	2024	Liga Panameña de Fútbol	7	1	—		4 (Note: Appearance(s) in CONCACAF Central American Cup)	0	—		11	1
Career Total			281	69	5	0	24	6	3	1	313	76

=== International ===
Scores and results list Panama's goal tally first, score column indicates score after each Aguilar goal.

List of international goals scored by Jorman Aguilar
No.	Date	Venue	Opponent	Score	Result	Competition	Ref.
1	5 June 2021	Estadio Nacional Rod Carew, Panama City, Panama	Anguilla	3–0	13–0	2022 FIFA World Cup qualification	

== Honours ==
Comunicaciones

- Liga Nacional de Guatemala: Apertura 2023
