= Rolando Blackburn =

Panamanian footballer (born 1990)

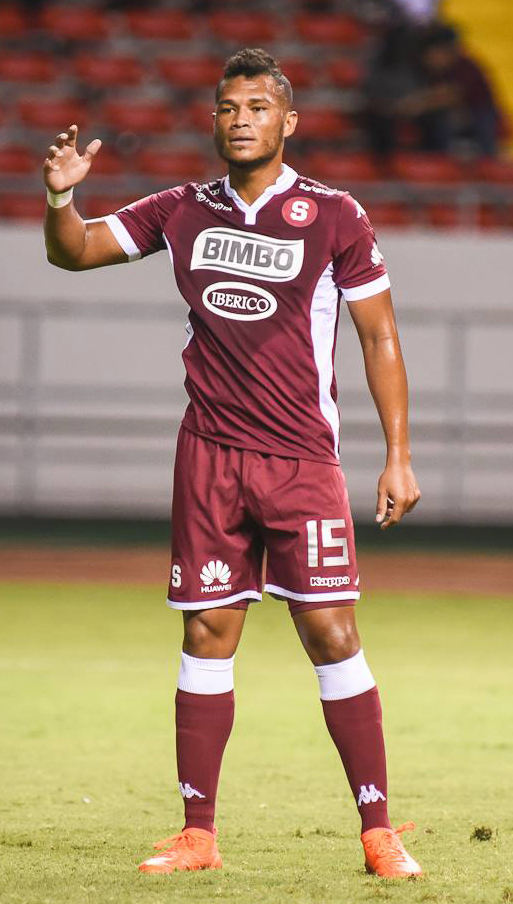
- Blackburn with Saprissa in 2016

Personal information
- Full name: Rolando Manrique Blackburn Ortega
- Date of birth: 9 January 1990 (age 36)
- Place of birth: San Joaquín, Panama
- Height: 1.80 m (5 ft 11 in)
- Position: Striker

Team information
- Current team: San Francisco
- Number: 9

Youth career
- Tauro

Senior career*
Years	Team	Apps	(Gls)
2009–2010	Tauro	4	(0)
2010	Juventud Retalteca	21	(3)
2011–2014	Chorrillo	40	(14)
2012–2013	→ Senica (loan)	41	(15)
2014–2018	Comunicaciones	88	(34)
2016–2017	→ Deportivo Saprissa (loan)	27	(8)
2017	→ Sporting Cristal (loan)	10	(4)
2017–2018	→ Chorrillo (loan)	30	(14)
2018–2021	The Strongest	94	(59)
2019	→ Port (loan)	12	(4)
2022	Royal Pari	11	(2)
2022	Alajuelense	13	(1)
2023	FAS	15	(3)
2023	Tauro	14	(8)
2024	UMECIT	13	(3)
2024	Victoria	18	(11)
2025–	San Francisco	15	(7)

International career^{‡}
2010	Panama U21	2	(1)
2011	Panama U23	4	(3)
2010–	Panama	56	(12)
- * Club domestic league appearances and goals as of 3 May 2025 ‡ National team caps and goals as of 10 September 2023 (UTC)

Rolando Manrique Blackburn Ortega (born 9 January 1990) is a Panamanian professional footballer who plays as a striker for San Francisco and the Panama national team.

== Club career ==
Born in San Joaquín, Panamá, he started his career at Tauro and had a spell abroad with Guatemalan side Juventud Retalteca, before joining Chorrillo after financial troubles struck Juventud.

=== FK Senica ===
In January 2012, he joined Slovak club Senica on loan from Chorrillo. Blackburn made his official debut for the club in 2–0 win over Slovan Bratislava in quarterfinals round of the Slovak Cup, on 7 March 2012. He returned from loan after one and a half years in Europe.

=== Comunicaciones ===
Nicknamed el Toro (the Bull), he joined Guatemalan giants Comunicaciones in 2014 and scored 10 goals in his first season.

== International career ==
Blackburn made his debut for Panama in a December 2010 friendly match against Honduras. He represented his country at the 2013 Copa Centroamericana and the 2013 CONCACAF Gold Cup.

In May 2018, he was named in Panama's preliminary 35-man squad for the 2018 World Cup in Russia. However, he did not make the final 23.

=== International goals ===
Scores and results list Panama's goal tally first, score column indicates score after each Blackburn goal.

List of international goals scored by Rolando Blackburn
No.	Date	Venue	Opponent	Score	Result	Competition
1.	15 November 2011	Estadio Rommel Fernández, Panama City, Panama	Dominica	1–0	3–0	2014 FIFA World Cup qualification
2.	11 September 2012	Estadio Rommel Fernández, Panama City, Panama	Canada	1–0	2–0	2014 FIFA World Cup qualification
3.	1 June 2013	Estadio Rommel Fernández, Panama City, Panama	Peru	1–0	1–1	Friendly
4.	8 September 2015	Polideportivo Cachamay, Ciudad Guayana, Venezuela	Venezuela	1–0	1–1	Friendly
5.	16 October 2018	Cheonan Stadium, Cheonan, South Korea	South Korea	2–2	2–2	Friendly
6.	5 September 2019	Bermuda National Stadium, Hamilton, Bermuda	Bermuda	1–0	4–1	2019–20 CONCACAF Nations League A
7.	13 July 2021	BBVA Stadium, Houston, United States	Qatar	1–1	3–3	2021 CONCACAF Gold Cup
8.	13 July 2021	BBVA Stadium, Houston, United States	Qatar	2–2	3–3	2021 CONCACAF Gold Cup
9.	5 September 2021	Independence Park, Kingston, Jamaica	Jamaica	2–0	3–0	2022 FIFA World Cup qualification
10.	8 September 2021	Estadio Rommel Fernández, Panama City, Panama	Mexico	1–0	1–1	2022 FIFA World Cup qualification
11.	13 October 2021	BMO Field, Toronto, Canada	Canada	1–0	1–4	2022 FIFA World Cup qualification
12.	24 March 2022	Estadio Rommel Fernández, Panama City, Panama	Honduras	1–0	1–1	2022 FIFA World Cup qualification

== Personal life ==
Born to parents Rolando and Vanesa, Blackburn is married to Yarkanis. They have a daughter.

== Honours ==
Chorrillo

- Liga Panameña de Fútbol: 2011 Apertura, 2014 Clausura, 2017 Apertura

Comunicaciones

- Liga Nacional de Fútbol de Guatemala: 2014 Apertura, 2015 Clausura

Deportivo Saprissa

- Liga FPD: 2016 Invierno

Port

- Thai FA Cup: 2019

Panama

- CONCACAF Gold Cup runner-up: 2013; third place: 2015
