= Liga Profesional de Futbol =

Liga Profesional de Futbol may refer to:

- Argentine Primera División, top flight football in Argentina
- Liga Panameña de Fútbol, top flight football in Panama
