= 1988 ANAPROF =

Anaprof Copa Bayer
- Season: 1988
- Dates: 26 February 1988 – 21 August 1988
- Champions: C.D. Plaza Amador; 1st title
- CONCACAF Champions' Cup: C.D. Plaza Amador; La Previsora
- Goals scored: 175
- Top goalscorer: Miguel Tello (13 goals)

The 1988 ANAPROF (also known as the Bayer Cup) for sponsorship reasons, is the 1st season of the ANAPROF, now known as Liga Panameña de Fútbol, the top-flight football in Panama. The season began on 26 February 1988 and ended in 21 August 1988. Six teams started the season, Chirilanco FC folded after one game.

== Teams ==
Locations of the 1988 ANAPROF season teams

Club	Home city	Stadium
A.F.C. Euro Kickers	Panama City	Estadio de Balboa
Chirilanco FC	Changuinola	Estadio El Empalme
C.D. Plaza Amador	Panama City	Estadio Revolución
Deportivo La Previsora	La Chorrera	Estadio Matuna
Deportivo Peru	Panama City	Cancha Milla 15
Tauro F.C.	Panama City	Cancha La Pedregaleña

== Facts ==
- First game 1–1 draw between C.D. Plaza Amador vs Tauro FC
- First scorer Carlos Maldonado from C.D. Plaza Amador
- First penalty awarded to Tauro FC and scored by Virgilio Reid
