= 2011–12 Liga Panameña de Fútbol season =

Liga Panameña de Fútbol
- Season: 2011–12
- Champions: Apertura: Chorrillo; Clausura: Tauro
- Champions League: Chorrillo; Tauro
- Matches played: 90
- Goals scored: 200 (2.22 per match)
- Biggest home win: Apertura: Tauro 3-0 Chepo; Chepo 3-0 Tauro
- Biggest away win: Apertura: Chiriquí 0-4 Chepo; Colón C-3 0-4 Tauro
- Highest scoring: Apertura: Alianza 5-3 Chepo

The 2011–12 Liga Panameña de Fútbol season is the 24th season of top-flight football in Panama. The season began on 15 July 2011 and ended in May 2012 with Chepo winning the final. Ten teams completed throughout the season.

== Teams ==
Atlético Veragüense finished in 10th place in the overall table last season and were relegated to the Liga Nacional de Ascenso. Taking their place for this season are the overall champions of last season's Liga Nacional de Ascenso, Colón C-3.

Locations of the 2011–12 LPF teams

Club	Home city	Stadium
Alianza	Panama City	Cancha Sintetica Rommel Fernández
Árabe Unido	Colón	Estadio Armando Dely Valdés
Atlético Chiriquí	David	Estadio San Cristóbal
Chepo	Chepo	Cancha Sintetica Rommel Fernández (in Panama City)
Chorrillo	Panama City	Estadio Javier Cruz
Colón C-3	Colón	Estadio Armando Dely Valdés
Plaza Amador	Panama City	Estadio Javier Cruz
San Francisco	La Chorrera	Estadio Agustín Sánchez
Sporting San Miguelito	San Miguelito	Estadio Bernardo Gil
Tauro	Panama City	Cancha Sintetica Rommel Fernández

=== Managerial changes ===
Team	Outgoing manager	Manner of departure	Date of vacancy	Position in table	Replaced by	Date of appointment	Position in table

== 2011 Apertura ==
The 2011 Apertura is the first tournament of the season. It began on 15 July 2011 and ended in December 2011.

=== First round ===
==== Standings ====
Pos	Team	Pld	W	D	L	GF	GA	GD	Pts	Qualification
1	Sporting San Miguelito	18	10	4	4	21	14	+7	34	Qualified to the Final Round
2	Chorrillo	18	9	5	4	26	19	+7	32	Qualified to the Final Round
3	San Francisco	18	9	4	5	23	19	+4	31	Qualified to the Final Round
4	Plaza Amador	18	9	4	5	22	21	+1	31	Qualified to the Final Round
5	Chepo	18	9	3	6	24	15	+9	30	
6	Tauro	18	9	1	8	23	16	+7	28	
7	Árabe Unido	18	7	4	7	17	17	0	25	
8	Alianza	18	3	7	8	20	27	−7	16	
9	Colón C-3	18	2	5	11	13	27	−14	11	
10	Atlético Chiriquí	18	2	5	11	12	26	−14	11	

Rules for classification: 1) points; 2) goal difference; 3) number of goals scored.

==== Results ====
Home \ Away	ALI	DÁU	CHI	CHE	CHO	COL	PA	SF	SSM	TAU
Alianza		1–1	1–1	5–3	2–4	0–0	0–0	0–1	2–0	0–3
Árabe Unido	1–0		3–1	1–3	0–1	0–0	2–1	1–2	2–1	0–1
Atlético Chiriquí	1–1	1–2		0–4	1–1	1–2	2–3	0–1	0–1	0–2
Chepo	2–0	1–0	0–0		0–1	0–0	0–1	1–1	0–1	3–0
Chorrillo	2–2	0–0	0–1	0–1		2–0	2–1	2–2	0–1	1–0
Colón C-3	2–2	0–1	1–4	0–1	1–2		1–1	0–1	0–1	0–4
Plaza Amador	1–3	0–0	1–0	0–3	2–1	2–1		2–1	0–0	1–0
San Francisco	1–0	3–2	2–0	1–2	2–2	1–3	0–1		2–2	1–0
Sporting San Miguelito	2–0	1–0	0–0	1–0	1–2	2–0	4–3	0–1		1–0
Tauro	2–1	0–1	1–0	3–0	1–2	3–2	1–2	1–0	1–1	

Legend: Blue = home team win; Yellow = draw; Red = away team win.

=== Final round ===
Semifinals
1	Sporting San Miguelito	2	1	3
4	Plaza Amador	3	2	5
2	Chorrillo	2	1	3
3	San Francisco	0	2	2

Final
4	Plaza Amador	1
2	Chorrillo	4

=== Semi-finals ===
==== First leg ====
18 November 2011
21:00 UTC-5

San Francisco	0–2	Chorrillo

Estadio Agustín Sánchez, La Chorrera

19 November 2011
20:00 UTC-5

Plaza Amador	3–2	Sporting San Miguelito

Estadio Rommel Fernández, Panama City

==== Second leg ====
25 November 2011
21:00 UTC-5

Chorrillo	1–2 (a.e.t.)	San Francisco

Estadio Javier Cruz, Panama City

Chorillo advances 3–2 on aggregate.

26 November 2011
20:00 UTC-5

Sporting San Miguelito	1–2	Plaza Amador

Estadio Bernardo Gil, San Miguelito

Plaza Amador advances 5–3 on aggregate.

=== Finals ===
3 December 2011
TBD UTC-5

Chorrillo	4–1	Plaza Amador
Blackburn 27', 63'; Phillips 77'; Addles 90'		Caicedo 85'

Estadio Rommel Fernández, Panama City

=== Top goalscorers ===
Pos	Name	Club	Goals
1st	(Panama) Delano Welch	Chepo	8
1st	(Panama) César Medina	Alianza	8

== 2012 Clausura ==
The 2012 Clausura is the second tournament of the season. It began in January 2012 and ended in May 2012.

=== First round ===
==== Standings ====
Pos	Team	Pld	W	D	L	GF	GA	GD	Pts	Qualification
1	Sporting San Miguelito	18	9	6	3	23	15	+8	33	Qualified to the Final Round
2	Árabe Unido	18	9	5	4	21	13	+8	32	Qualified to the Final Round
3	Chepo	18	8	7	3	24	13	+11	31	Qualified to the Final Round
4	Tauro	18	6	8	4	20	16	+4	26	Qualified to the Final Round
5	Chorrillo	18	5	10	3	23	20	+3	25	
6	San Francisco	18	5	7	6	17	18	−1	22	
7	Atlético Chiriquí	18	4	8	6	14	17	−3	20	
8	Alianza	18	5	5	8	21	28	−7	20	
9	Colón C-3	18	3	6	9	14	25	−11	15	
10	Plaza Amador	18	2	6	10	16	28	−12	12	

Updated to match(es) played on 29 April 2012. Source:
Rules for classification: 1) points; 2) goal difference; 3) number of goals scored.

==== Results ====
Home \ Away	ALI	DÁU	CHI	CHE	CHO	COL	PA	SF	SSM	TAU
Alianza		0–2	1–1	1–2	1–1	2–0	1–0	1–1	1–3	4–2
Árabe Unido	3–1		1–1	2–1	1–0	1–0	1–1	2–1	0–0	0–1
Atlético Chiriquí	0–2	0–2		1–0	1–2	0–0	0–0	0–0	0–1	0–1
Chepo	5–0	2–1	2–0		1–1	2–1	2–0	1–0	2–2	2–1
Chorrillo	3–1	1–1	0–2	0–0		3–1	2–1	3–1	1–1	1–1
Colón C-3	1–1	1–1	0–1	1–1	2–2		2–1	0–1	1–0	0–3
Plaza Amador	1–0	1–2	2–4	1–1	0–0	2–1		1–1	2–3	1–3
San Francisco	1–0	0–1	1–1	1–0	1–1	1–1	3–1		0–1	1–1
Sporting San Miguelito	1–3	1–0	1–1	0–0	3–1	1–2	1–0	3–1		1–0
Tauro	1–1	1–0	1–1	0–0	1–1	2–0	1–1	0–2	0–0	

Updated to match(es) played on 29 April 2012. Source:
Legend: Blue = home team win; Yellow = draw; Red = away team win.

=== Final round ===
Semifinals
1	Sporting San Miguelito	0	0	0
4	Tauro	1	1	2
2	Árabe Unido	0	0	0
3	Chepo	1	0	1

Final
4	Tauro	2
3	Chepo	1

=== Semi-finals ===
==== First leg ====
Friday, 4 May 2012
? UTC-5

Tauro	1–0	Sporting San Miguelito

Sunday, 6 May 2012
? UTC-5

Chepo	1–0	Árabe Unido

==== Second leg ====
Saturday, 12 May 2012
? UTC-5

Sporting San Miguelito	0–1	Tauro

Saturday, 12 May 2012
? UTC-5

Árabe Unido	0–0	Chepo

=== Final ===
Tuesday, 22 May 2012
22:00 UTC-5

Tauro	2–1	Chepo

Estadio Rommel Fernández Gutiérrez, Ciudad del Panama

=== Top goalscorers ===
Pos	Name	Club	Goals

== Aggregate table ==
Pos	Team	Pld	W	D	L	GF	GA	GD	Pts	Qualification or relegation
1	Sporting San Miguelito	36	19	10	7	44	29	+15	67	
2	Chepo	36	17	10	9	48	28	+20	61	
3	Chorrillo	36	14	15	7	49	39	+10	57	Qualification for 2012–13 CONCACAF Champions League Group Stage
4	Árabe Unido	36	16	9	11	38	30	+8	57	
5	Tauro	36	15	9	12	43	32	+11	54	Qualification for 2012–13 CONCACAF Champions League Group Stage
6	San Francisco	36	14	11	11	40	37	+3	53	
7	Plaza Amador	36	11	10	15	38	49	−11	43	
8	Alianza	36	8	12	16	41	55	−14	36	
9	Atlético Chiriquí	36	6	13	17	26	43	−17	31	
10	Colón C-3	36	5	11	20	27	52	−25	26	Relegation to 2012–13 Liga de Ascenso

Rules for classification: 1) points; 2) goal difference; 3) number of goals scored.
