= Sebastián Valenzuela =

Colombian footballer (born 1999)

Personal information
- Full name: Sebastián Alexander Valenzuela Barba
- Date of birth: 6 January 1999 (age 27)
- Place of birth: Pasto, Colombia
- Height: 1.73 m (5 ft 8 in)
- Position: Right winger

Youth career
- 2015–2019: Deportivo Pasto

Senior career*
Years	Team	Apps	(Gls)
2019–2021	Deportivo Pasto	4	(0)
2022	Atlético	18	(1)
- * Club domestic league appearances and goals as of 17:27, 26 February 2023 (UTC)

Sebastián Alexander Valenzuela Barba (born 6 January 1999) is a Colombian footballer who plays as a right winger.

== Club career ==
=== Deportivo Pasto ===
Valenzuela started playing football at a football school in Pasto called Escuela de Fútbol Club Javeriano, where he already at the age of 14 - and several years forward - played with the U17's. Here he was for seven year until he was 16 years old. He then joined Deportivo Pasto in 2015. In 2017, he became the top scorer of the Supercopa Juvenil FCF, which is a tournament arranged by the Colombian Football Federation, with 15 goals, although he was the youngest played in the team.

After having been on the bench for two games in the Categoría Primera A in 2018, Valenzuela got his professional debut for Deportivo Pasto on 9 October 2019 against Alianza Petrolera in the Categoría Primera A. He started on the bench, but replaced Romeesh Ivey in the 86th minute. This was his only appearance for the first team in that season. After good performances with the U20's, he was permanently promoted to the first team squad in November 2019.

=== Atlético Cali ===
On 19 January 2022, Valenzuela moved to Categoría Primera B side Atlético Cali. He got his debut for the club on 22 January 2022 against Boca Juniors de Cali.
