= Rolando Botello =

Panamanian footballer (born 1991)

Personal information
- Full name: Rolando Vicente Botello Garibaldo
- Date of birth: 20 November 1991 (age 34)
- Place of birth: Panama City, Panama
- Height: 1.69 m (5 ft 7 in)
- Position: Midfielder

Team information
- Current team: Tauro
- Number: 6

Senior career*
Years	Team	Apps	(Gls)
2010–2014	Tauro	59	(2)
2014–2017	Sporting San Miguelito	65	(7)
2017–	Tauro	122	(1)

International career^{‡}
2010–2011	Panama U20	5	(0)
2012–	Panama	7	(0)
- * Club domestic league appearances and goals as of 30 January 2021 ‡ National team caps and goals as of 30 January 2021

Rolando Vicente Botello Garibaldo (born 20 November 1991) is a Panamanian professional footballer who plays as midfielder for Liga Panameña de Fútbol side Tauro and the Panama national team.

== International career ==
Botello made his debut for the Panama national team in a 1-0 friendly loss to the United States on 26 January 2012.

== Honours ==
Tauro

- Liga Panameña de Fútbol: 2010–11 Clausura, 2011–12 Clausura, 2013–14 Apertura, 2016–17 Clausura, 2018–19 Apertura, 2019 Apertura
