= Panamanian football clubs in international competitions =

The following is an outline of the participation of Panamanian football teams in the regional tournaments offered by CONCACAF. Since 1988, Panama has almost always sent at least one team to the competitions. The first appearance by a Panamanian team was in the 1988 CONCACAF Champions' Cup, when Plaza Amador played in the first round.

The best run for a Panamanian team was in 2002, when Árabe Unido finished runner-up in the UNCAF Interclub Cup.

Teams from Panama have participated in nearly every edition of the CONCACAF Champions Cup (2008–present). Their best results at the tournament have been runs to the quarter-finals on five occasions: Árabe Unido in 2010, 2014, and 2017, Tauro in 2018, and Indepediente in 2019.

Panamanian teams also competed in every edition of the CONCACAF League, which began in 2017 and ended in 2021. Sides from Panama reached the semi-finals of the tournament four times: Árabe Unido in 2017 and 2018, Plaza Amador in 2017, and Tauro in 2018.

Panamanian teams now compete in the CONCACAF Central American Cup, which began in 2023.

== CONCACAF Champions Cup era (1962–2008, 2024–present) ==
Season	Team	Round	Opponent	1st leg	2nd leg	Aggregate
1988	Plaza Amador	First round	(Costa Rica) Alajuelense	0–2	1–2	1–4
1989	Plaza Amador	First round	(Belize) Coke Milpross	1–1	4–1	5–1
1989	Plaza Amador	Second round	(Mexico) Pumas UNAM	0–4	0–6	0–10
1989	Deportivo La Previsora	Preliminary round	(Nicaragua) America Managua	1–1	2–0	3–1
1989	Deportivo La Previsora	First round	(Belize) Duurly's	3–0	6–2	9–2
1989	Deportivo La Previsora	Second round	(Mexico) UDG	0–1	5–5	5–6
1990	Tauro	First round	(El Salvador) Firpo	1–1	0–3	1–4
1990	Deportivo La Previsora	First round	(El Salvador) Alianza	1–10	0–2	1–12
1991	Plaza Amador	First round	(Costa Rica) Alajuelense	1–4	0–7	1–11
1991	Tauro	First round	(Nicaragua) América Managua	5–0	0–0	5–0
1991	Tauro	Second round	(Costa Rica) Saprissa	1–3	0–2	1–5
1992	Eurokickers	First round	(United States) SF Bay Blackhawks	0–10	0–1	0–11
1992	Tauro	First round	(Nicaragua) Real Estelí	2–0	5–1	7–1
1992	Tauro	Second round	(United States) Dallas Rockets	1–3	2–2	3–5
1993	Sporting Colon	Preliminary round	(Guatemala) Comunicaciones	0–1	1–3	1–4
1993	Plaza Amador	Preliminary round	(Nicaragua) Juventus Managua	5–0	4–0	9–0
1993	Plaza Amador	First round	(El Salvador) Firpo	2–2	0–6	2–8
1995	Árabe Unido	First round	(El Salvador) FAS	0–4	1–1	1–5
1995	PROJUSA	First round	(Nicaragua) Juventus Managua	1–1	2–1	3–1
1995	PROJUSA	Second round	(Mexico) Guadalajara	0–5	0–10	0–15
1996	Cosmos	First round	(Guatemala) Comunicaciones	0–2	0–4	0–6
1996	Árabe Unido	First round	(Nicaragua) Real Estelí	1–1	1–0	2–1
1996	Árabe Unido	Second round	(Honduras) Victoria	0–1	1–2	1–3
1997	Euro Kickers	Preliminary round	(Nicaragua) Dariangén	4–2	1–4	5–6
1997	Tauro	First round	(Costa Rica) Cartaginés	0–5	2–4	2–9
Return to Champions Cup format (2024–present)
2024	Independiente	First round	(United States) New England Revolution	0–1	0–3	0–4
2026	Sporting San Miguelito	First round	(United States) LA Galaxy	1–1	0–0	1–1 (a)

== CONCACAF Champions League era (2008–2023) ==
Season	Team	Round	Opponent	Home	Away	Aggregate
2008–09	San Francisco	Preliminary round	(Guatemala) Jalapa	5–0	0–1	5–1
2008–09	San Francisco	Group stage	(Mexico) Pumas UNAM	1–1	0–6	4th
2008–09	San Francisco	Group stage	Houston Dynamo	0–0	1–2	4th
2008–09	San Francisco	Group stage	(El Salvador) Firpo	2–3	0–1	4th
2008–09	Tauro	Preliminary round	Chivas USA	2–0	1–1	3–1
2008–09	Tauro	Group stage	Puerto Rico Islanders	2–2	1–2	3rd
2008–09	Tauro	Group stage	(Guatemala) Municipal	2–1	2–2	3rd
2008–09	Tauro	Group stage	(Mexico) Santos Laguna	2–0	0–3	3rd
2009–10	San Francisco	Preliminary round	(Trinidad and Tobago) San Juan Jabloteh	2–0	0–3	2–3
2009–10	Árabe Unido	Preliminary round	(Honduras) Olimpia	1–0	1–2	2–2 (a)
2009–10	Árabe Unido	Group stage	(Mexico) Pachuca	4–1	0–2	2nd
2009–10	Árabe Unido	Group stage	(United States) Houston Dynamo	1–1	1–5	2nd
2009–10	Árabe Unido	Group stage	(El Salvador) Isidro Metapán	6–0	1–0	2nd
2009–10	Árabe Unido	Quarter-finals	(Mexico) Cruz Azul	0–1	0–3	0–4
2010–11	Tauro	Preliminary round	(Honduras) Marathón	0–3	2–1	2–4
2010–11	San Francisco	Preliminary round	(Mexico) Cruz Azul	2–3	0–6	2–9
2010–11	Árabe Unido	Group stage	(United States) Real Salt Lake	2–3	1–2	4th
2010–11	Árabe Unido	Group stage	(Canada) Toronto FC	1–0	0–1	4th
2010–11	Árabe Unido	Group stage	(Mexico) Cruz Azul	0–6	0–2	4th
2011–12	San Francisco	Preliminary round	(United States) Seattle Sounders FC	1–0	0–2	1–2
2011–12	Tauro	Group stage	(Canada) Toronto FC	1–2	0–1	4th
2011–12	Tauro	Group stage	(Mexico) Pumas UNAM	0–0	0–1	4th
2011–12	Tauro	Group stage	(United States) FC Dallas	5–3	1–1	4th
2012–13	Tauro	Group stage	(United States) Real Salt Lake	0–1	0–2	3rd
2012–13	Tauro	Group stage	(Costa Rica) Herediano	0–1	1–2	3rd
2012–13	Chorrillo	Group stage	(Mexico) Monterrey	0–6	0–5	3rd
2012–13	Chorrillo	Group stage	(Guatemala) Municipal	1–2	1–2	3rd
Season	Team	Round	Opponent	Home	Away	Aggregate
2013–14	Sporting San Miguelito	Group stage	(Mexico) América	0–1	0–3	3rd
2013–14	Sporting San Miguelito	Group stage	(Costa Rica) Alajuelense	1–0	0–2	3rd
2013–14	Árabe Unido	Group stage	(Trinidad and Tobago) W Connection	3–1	2–0	1st
2013–14	Árabe Unido	Group stage	(United States) Houston Dynamo	1–0	1–2	1st
2013–14	Árabe Unido	Quarter-finals	(Costa Rica) Alajuelense	0–2	0–0	0–2
2014–15	Tauro	Group stage	(Jamaica) Waterhouse	1–2	1–4	3rd
2014–15	Tauro	Group stage	(United States) D.C. United	0–1	0–2	3rd
2014–15	Chorrillo	Group stage	(Mexico) Cruz Azul	1–0	0–3	3rd
2014–15	Chorrillo	Group stage	(Costa Rica) Alajuelense	1–1	0–1	3rd
2015–16	San Francisco	Group stage	(Mexico) Querétaro	2–1	0–2	2nd
2015–16	San Francisco	Group stage	(Belize) Verdes	8–0	1–2	2nd
2015–16	Árabe Unido	Group stage	(Jamaica) Montego Bay United	3–0	2–1	2nd
2015–16	Árabe Unido	Group stage	(United States) D.C. United	0–1	0–2	2nd
2016–17	Plaza Amador	Group stage	(Costa Rica) Herediano	1–1	0–2	3rd
2016–17	Plaza Amador	Group stage	(Mexico) Tigres UANL	1–0	1–3	3rd
2016–17	Árabe Unido	Group stage	(Mexico) Monterrey	2–1	3–2	1st
2016–17	Árabe Unido	Group stage	(Haiti) Don Bosco	2–0	5–2	1st
2016–17	Árabe Unido	Quarter-finals	(United States) FC Dallas	2–1	0–4	2–5
2018	Tauro	Round of 16	(United States) FC Dallas	1–0	2–3	3–3 (a)
2018	Tauro	Quarter-finals	(Mexico) América	1–3	0–4	1–7
2019	Independiente	Round of 16	(Canada) Toronto FC	4–0	1–1	5–1
2019	Independiente	Quarter-finals	(United States) Sporting Kansas City	2–1	0–3	2–4

== CONCACAF League (2017–2021) ==
Season	Team	Round	Opponent	Home	Away	Aggregate
2017	Chorrillo	Round of 16	Honduras Progresso	1–0	1–0	2–0
2017	Chorrillo	Quarter-finals	(Costa Rica) Santos de Guápiles	0–1	1–0	0–2
2017	Plaza Amador	Round of 16	(Jamaica) Portmore United	1–0	0–1	1–1 (5–4 p)
2017	Plaza Amador	Quarter-finals	(Nicaragua) Walter Ferreti	2–1	0–0	2–1
2017	Plaza Amador	Semi-finals	(Honduras) Olimpia	1–7	1–1	2–8
2017	Árabe Unido	Round of 16	(Trinidad and Tobago) Central	3–0	2–1	5–1
2017	Árabe Unido	Quarter-finals	(El Salvador) Águila	0–1	2–0	2–1
2017	Árabe Unido	Semi-finals	(Costa Rica) Santos de Guápiles	0–0	0–1	0–1
2018	Universitario	Round of 16	(Nicaragua) Diriangén	3–1	4–0	7–1
2018	Universitario	Quarter-finals	(Costa Rica) Herediano	1–2	0–3	1–4
2018	Tauro	Round of 16	(Honduras) Real España	1–0	1–1	2–1
2018	Tauro	Quarter-finals	(Nicaragua) Walter Ferreti	3–1	4–0	7–1
2018	Tauro	Semi-finals	(Honduras) Motagua	2–1	0–2	2–3
2018	Árabe Unido	Round of 16	(Jamaica) Arnett Gardens	3–0	1–2	4–2
2018	Árabe Unido	Quarter-finals	(El Salvador) FAS	3–1	1–0	4–1
2018	Árabe Unido	Semi-finals	(Costa Rica) Herediano	1–0	0–2	1–2
2019	Tauro	Round of 16	(El Salvador) Alianza	1–0	0–2	1–2
2019	Independiente	Round of 16	(Suriname) Robinhood	2–1	1–1	3–2
2019	Independiente	Quarter-finals	(Costa Rica) Saprissa	0–0	0–0	0–0
2019	San Francisco	Preliminary round	(El Salvador) Alianza	0–1	1–5	1–6
2020	Tauro	Round of 16	(Canada) Forge FC	1–2	N/A	
2020	Independiente	Preliminary round	(Guatemala) Antigua GFC	0–0 (2–4 p)	N/A	
2020	San Francisco	Round of 16	(Costa Rica) Alajuelense	0–1	N/A	
2021	Independiente	Round of 16	(Canada) Forge FC	0–2	0–0	0–2
2021	Plaza Amador	Round of 16	(Costa Rica) Santos de Guápiles	0–2	0–1	0–3
2021	Universitario	Preliminary round	(Martinique) Samaritaine	N/A		3–0 (w/o)
2021	Universitario	Round of 16	(Honduras) Motagua	2–2	0–1	2–3
