= José Ardines =

Panamanian footballer (born 1968)

Personal information
- Full name: José María Ardines Douglas
- Date of birth: August 7, 1968 (age 58)
- Place of birth: Panama City, Panama
- Position: Forward

Senior career*
Years	Team	Apps	(Gls)
1989–2001	Eurokickers		(191)
1991–1992	Marathón		
2001	San Francisco		(4)
2002	Alianza		(2)
2002	Orión		

International career^{‡}
1992	Panama	2	(0)
- * Club domestic league appearances and goals as of 17 February 2010 ‡ National team caps and goals as of 17 February 2010

José María Ardines Douglas (born August 7, 1968, in Panama City, Panama) is a Panamanian retired football forward. Nicknamed chepe, he is best known for being the all-time top scorer in the Panamanian national football league ANAPROF (now known as Liga Panameña de Fútbol).

== Club career ==
=== Eurokickers ===
Chepe Ardines made his debut in ANAPROF for the 1989 season of the championship with Eurokickers where he enjoyed most of his success. Chepe played 12 seasons with the vikings until the team was relegated to Primera A in 2001 and only interumpting his stay during the ANAPROF 1992 offseason where he was part of Honduran side Marathón. With Eurokickers, Ardines scored a record high total of 191 goals, becoming the top-scorer for six consecutive seasons (1990-1995-96) and also the player to have scored the most goals in a single season in 1990 with 26 goals. On 20 December 1997, he scored a stunning 11 goals in a 13-2 thrashing of Ejecutivo Jrs. All of these records still stand today and are part of the goalscoring legacy left by Ardines in the national football league. Ardines was voted the league's most valuable player three times in 1990, 1992 and 1993. He was also part of the side that was crowned champion in 1993.

His 100th goal in ANAPROF was scored on November 13, 1994 against Plaza Amador's goalkeeper Gaspar Pérez in a 2-1 defeat of Eurokickers.

=== San Francisco & Alianza ===
After the relegation of Eurokickers in the 2000-01 season, Ardines was signed by San Francisco. He enjoyed a short one-year spell in which he only scored a total of 4 goals, 3 in the Apertura and 1 in the Clausura championship. In 2002, he moved to Alianza where he also had a disappointing run scoring 2 goals for the Apertura championship. After that short 6-month stay Adrines would not play in the ANAPROF again after scoring a record total of 197 in the league. He later joined Primera A side Orión for the 2002 season.

=== Orión ===
Ardines played his last season of his Panamanian football career with Orión of the Primera A in 2002.

== International career ==
Unfortunately for Ardines, he never enjoyed the same success in the Panama national football team as he did with Eurokickers in ANAPROF. He was called up a couple of times between 1992 and 1996 where he only played friendly games but was never part of the team that played World Cup qualification matches. The main reason behind this is that he was competing with figures like Rommel Fernández, Jorge Dely Valdés and Julio Dely Valdés, all of whom were being successful internationally.

== Honours ==
Club

- ANAPROF: 1993

Individual

- ANAPROF Top Scorer: 1990, 1991, 1992, 1993, 1994-95, 1995-96
- ANAPROF Most Valuable Player: 1990, 1992, 1993
