= 2014–15 Liga Panameña de Fútbol season =

Liga Panameña de Fútbol
- Season: 2014–15
- Champions: Apertura: San Francisco; Clausura: Árabe Unido
- Relegated: Independiente
- Champions League: San Francisco; Árabe Unido
- Biggest away win: Chepo 1–6 San Francisco
- Highest scoring: Chepo 1–6 San Francisco

The 2014–15 Liga Panameña de Fútbol season (also known as the Liga Cable Onda) was the 26th season of top-flight football in Panama. The season began on 18 July 2014 and was scheduled to end in May 2015. Ten teams competed throughout the entire season.

== Teams ==
Rio Abajo finished in 10th place in the overall table last season and were relegated to the Liga Nacional de Ascenso. Taking their place for this season are the overall champions of last season's Liga Nacional de Ascenso Atlético Chiriquí.

Club	Home city	Stadium
Alianza	Panama City	Cancha de Entrenamiento Luis Tapia
Árabe Unido	Colón	Cancha de Entrenamiento Luis Tapia (in Panama City)
Atlético Chiriquí	David, Chiriquí	Estadio San Cristóbal
Chepo	Chepo	Cancha de Entrenamiento Luis Tapia (in Panama City)
Chorrillo	Panama City	Estadio Javier Cruz
Independiente F.C.	La Chorrera	Estadio Agustín Sánchez
Plaza Amador	Panama City	Estadio Javier Cruz
San Francisco	La Chorrera	Estadio Agustín Sánchez
Sporting San Miguelito	San Miguelito	Cancha de Entrenamiento Luis Tapia
Tauro	Panama City	Cancha de Entrenamiento Luis Tapia

== 2014 Apertura ==
=== Personnel and sponsoring (2014 Apertura) ===
Team	Chairman	Head coach	Kitmaker	Shirt sponsor
Alianza	TBD	(Costa Rica) Leroy Foster	Lotto	Balboa
Árabe Unido	TBD	(Colombia) Jair Palacios	KELME	Pizza Hut
Atlético Chiriquí		(Costa Rica) Javier Wanchope	Mitre	ShowGo
Chepo	TBD	(Panama) Jorge Santos	GEMS	EGS, NCO
Chorrillo		(Panama) Julio Medina III	Lotto	McDonald's, Cremoso,
Independiente		(Panama) René Mendieta	Lotto	Subway
Plaza Amador	TBD	(United States) (Panama) Mike Stump	Diadora	Paguela Facil, Frosquito, Mercana
San Francisco	Julio Quijano	(England) (Panama) Gary Stempel	Lotto	KFC, Canon, Banco General
Sporting San Miguelito	TBD	(Panama) José Anthony "Chalate" Torres	TBD	Kenwood, Hyundai
Tauro	TBD	(Panama) Rolando Palma	TBD	Publicar Pagina amarilla,

=== During the season ===
Team	Outgoing manager	Manner of departure	Date of vacancy	Replaced by	Date of appointment	Position in table
Tauro	(Panama) Rolando Palma	Resigned	8 August 2014	(Panama) Jorge Dely Valdés	9 August 2014	8th (TBD)
Árabe Unido	(Colombia) Jair Palacios	Sacked	18 August 2014	(Panama) Julio Dely Valdés	18 August 2014	5th (TBD)
Alianza F.C.	(Costa Rica) Leroy Foster	Sacked	September 2014	(Colombia) Juan Pablo Lopera	16 September 2014	5th (TBD)

=== Standings ===
Pos	Team	Pld	W	D	L	GF	GA	GD	Pts	Qualification
1	Sporting San Miguelito (Q)	18	10	1	7	29	27	+2	31	Qualified to the Final Round
2	Chorrillo (Q)	18	8	6	4	22	17	+5	30	Qualified to the Final Round
3	San Francisco (Q)	18	7	7	4	27	17	+10	28	Qualified to the Final Round
4	Tauro (Q)	18	7	6	5	19	15	+4	27	Qualified to the Final Round
5	Chepo	18	7	6	5	17	19	−2	27	
6	Árabe Unido	18	7	5	6	23	19	+4	26	
7	Plaza Amador	18	7	4	7	20	19	+1	25	
8	Alianza	18	7	3	8	20	22	−2	24	
9	Atlético Chiriquí	18	4	7	7	16	21	−5	19	
10	Independiente	18	2	3	13	11	28	−17	9	

Updated to match(es) played on 31 October 2014. Source: http://lpf.com.pa/w/
Rules for classification: 1) points; 2) goal difference; 3) number of goals scored.
(Q) Qualified for the phase indicated

=== Results ===
Home \ Away	ALI	DÁU	CHI	CHE	CHO	IND	PA	SF	SSM	TAU
Alianza		3–1	1–0	1–0	1–2	4–0	2–1	1–3	1–4	1–2
Árabe Unido	0–1		2–2	1–1	1–2	3–0	3–1	0–2	2–1	2–1
Atlético Chiriquí	1–0	0–1		0–0	1–0	1–0	0–0	1–1	0–1	1–1
Chepo	1–0	1–0	1–1		1–1	0–0	2–0	1–6	1–2	0–3
Chorrillo	1–1	1–1	4–3	0–1		0–0	0–2	1–3	3–0	1–1
Independiente	0–1	1–0	0–2	1–2	0–1		1–1	1–2	1–2	1–2
Plaza Amador	0–0	0–1	4–1	2–1	0–0	2–1		1–2	0–1	1–0
San Francisco	1–1	0–0	1–1	0–2	0–1	1–2	1–2		2–0	0–0
Sporting San Miguelito	3–1	1–4	2–0	1–2	1–3	1–0	2–3	1–1		3–1
Tauro	2–0	1–1	2–1	0–0	0–1	1–0	1–0	1–1	0–1	

Updated to match(es) played on 31 October 2014. Source:
Legend: Blue = home team win; Yellow = draw; Red = away team win.

=== Semifinals ===
==== First leg ====
7 November 2014
21:00 UTC-5

San Francisco	1–0	Chorrillo
Ruiz 50'	Report

Estadio Agustín Sánchez, La Chorrera

7 November 2014
21:00 UTC-5

Tauro	2–1	Sporting San Miguelito
Palma 18'; Pérez 87'	Report	Yau 84'

Estadio Rommel Fernández, Panama City

==== Second leg ====
15 November 2014
19:00 UTC-5

Chorrillo	1–1	San Francisco
Moreno 18'	Report	Ruiz 41'

Estadio Maracaná, Panama City

San Francisco won 2–1 on aggregate.

15 November 2014
21:00 UTC-5

Sporting San Miguelito	1–0 (a.e.t.)	Tauro
Yau 79' (pen.)	Report
Penalties
Yau (penalty scored); Botello (penalty scored); Davis (penalty scored); Earley (penalty scored)	4–3	(penalty missed) Moreno; (penalty scored) Vélez; (penalty scored) Mena; (penalty scored) Rentería; (penalty missed) Pérez

Estadio Rommel Fernández, Panama City

Sporting San Miguelito 2–2 Tauro on aggregate. Sporting San Miguelito won 4–3 on penalties.

=== Final ===
22 November 2014
20:00 UTC-5

Sporting San Miguelito	0–1	San Francisco
	Report	Rodriguez 28'

Estadio Rommel Fernández, Panama City

Apertura 2014 champions

9th title

== 2015 Clausura ==
=== Personnel and sponsoring (2015 Clausura) ===
Team	Chairman	Head coach	Kitmaker	Shirt sponsor
Alianza	TBD	(Colombia) Juan Pablo Lopera	Lotto	Balboa, Epistmo
Árabe Unido	TBA	(Colombia) Jesús "Kiko" Barrios	Puma	Pizza Hut
Chepo	TBD	(Panama) Jorge Santos	Gems	EGS
Chorrillo		(Panama) Julio Medina III	Lotto	McDonald's
Independiente		(Colombia) Jair Palacios	Lotto	Subway
Plaza Amador	TBD	(Spain) Juan Carlos García	Diadora	Fresquito, Paguelo Facil
Atlético Chiriquí		(Costa Rica) Javier Wanchope	Mitre	Showpro
San Francisco	Julio Quijano	(England) (Panama) Gary Stempel	Lotto	KFC, Balboa, Cannon, Banco General
Sporting San Miguelito	TBD	(Panama) José Anthony "Chalate" Torres	Joma	Kenwood, Hyundai
Tauro	TBD	(Panama) José Alfredo Poyatos	Patrick	Fantastic, Publicar

=== During the season ===
Team	Outgoing manager	Manner of departure	Date of vacancy	Replaced by	Date of appointment	Position in table
Árabe Unido	(Colombia) Jesús Barrios	Resigned	Jan 2015	(Colombia) Alfonso de Moya	15 Jan 2015	th (TBD)
Árabe Unido	(Colombia) Alfonso de Moya	Resigned	Feb 2015	(Colombia) Juan Sergio Guzman	16 Feb 2015	th (TBD)
Tauro	(Panama) José Alfredo Poyatos	Resigned	March 2015	(Panama) Mike Stump	6 March 2015	th (TBD)

=== Standings ===
Pos	Team	Pld	W	D	L	GF	GA	GD	Pts	Qualification
1	Sporting San Miguelito	18	7	9	2	23	15	+8	30	Qualified to the Final Round
2	Árabe Unido	18	8	5	5	22	16	+6	29	Qualified to the Final Round
3	Plaza Amador	18	7	7	4	28	23	+5	28	Qualified to the Final Round
4	Independiente	18	7	5	6	23	21	+2	26	Qualified to the Final Round
5	San Francisco	18	6	7	5	22	19	+3	25	
6	Alianza	18	6	4	8	23	23	0	22	
7	Chepo	18	5	7	6	19	22	−3	22	
8	Tauro	18	5	7	6	22	26	−4	22	
9	Chorrillo	18	3	8	7	16	22	−6	17	
10	Atlético Chiriquí	18	4	5	9	14	25	−11	17	

Updated to match(es) played on 7 March 2015. Source:
Rules for classification: 1) points; 2) goal difference; 3) number of goals scored.

=== Results ===
Home \ Away	ALI	DÁU	CHI	CHE	CHO	IND	PA	SF	SSM	TAU
Alianza		2–1	2–1	1–1	3–0	0–1	2–3	1–0	1–1	1–3
Árabe Unido	2–1		3–1	0–1	2–2	1–0	1–1	2–0	1–0	0–1
Atlético Chiriquí	1–1	0–2		1–2	0–0	0–0	1–3	1–0	2–0	0–0
Chepo	2–1	1–0	0–2		1–1	1–2	0–1	1–2	1–1	1–1
Chorrillo	2–1	1–1	4–0	2–2		0–0	1–0	0–2	0–2	0–2
Independiente	1–0	1–0	4–2	2–0	1–1		1–2	0–1	0–2	4–2
Plaza Amador	0–1	1–2	2–1	1–1	1–1	4–2		2–2	1–1	3–1
San Francisco	4–1	2–2	0–1	1–0	1–0	1–1	1–1		2–2	0–1
Sporting San Miguelito	0–0	1–1	2–0	2–2	1–0	1–0	2–0	2–2		2–1
Tauro	0–4	0–1	0–0	1–2	2–1	3–3	2–2	1–1	1–1	

Updated to match(es) played on July 2014. Source:
Legend: Blue = home team win; Yellow = draw; Red = away team win.

=== Semifinals ===
==== First leg ====
16 May 2015

Independiente	1–0	Sporting San Miguelito
Rene Campbell 16' (pen.)		None

Estadio Agustín Muquita Sánchez, La Chorrera

17 May 2015

Plaza Amador	0–1	Arabe Unido
None		Abdiel Arroyo 83'

Estadio Rommel Fernández Gutiérrez, Panama City

==== Second leg ====
23 May 2015

Sporting San Miguelito	2–2	Independiente
Alexis Palacios 15'; Aramis Haywood 29'		Joseph Cox 38'; Carlos Navas 92'

Estadio Oscar Suman Carrillo, Panama City
Referee: Luis Rodriguez

Independiente won 3-2 on aggregate.

23 May 2015

Arabe Unido	1–1	Plaza Amador
Abdiel Arroyo 108' (pen.)		Fidel Caesar 79' (o.g.)

Estadio Armando Dely Valdez, Colon
Referee: Jafeth Perea

Arabe Unido 2–1 won on aggregate.

=== Final ===
31 May 2015
20:00 UTC-5

Arabe Unido	2–1	Independiente
Abdiel Arroyo 81'; Gabriel Pino 87'		Carlos Sierra 34'

Estadio Rommel Fernández, Panama City

Clausura 2015 champions

11th title

== Top goalscorers ==
Rank	Player	Team	Goals
1	(Panama) Sergio Moreno	Chorrillo F.C.	7
2	(Panama) Johnny Ruiz	San Francisco F.C.	7
3	(Panama) Ricaurte Barsallo	Alianza	6
4	(Panama) Ricardo Buitrago	Plaza Amador	6
5	(Panama) Renán Addles	Arabe Unido	5
6	(Panama) Valentin Pimentel	Plaza Amador	5
7	(Panama) Miguel Angel Saavedra	Atletico Chiriquí	5
8	(Panama) Amir Alberto Waithe	Tauro F.C.	5
9	(Panama) René Campbell	Independiente	4
10	(Panama) Joseph Cox	Independiente	4

== Aggregate table ==
Pos	Team	Pld	W	D	L	GF	GA	GD	Pts	Qualification or relegation
1	Sporting San Miguelito	36	17	10	9	52	42	+10	61	
2	Árabe Unido	36	15	10	11	45	35	+10	55	Qualification for 2015–16 CONCACAF Champions League Group Stage
3	San Francisco	36	13	14	9	49	36	+13	53	Qualification for 2015–16 CONCACAF Champions League Group Stage
4	Plaza Amador	36	14	11	11	48	42	+6	53	
5	Tauro	36	12	13	11	41	41	0	49	
6	Chepo	36	12	13	11	47	47	0	49	
7	Chorrillo	36	12	13	11	36	41	−5	49	
8	Alianza	36	13	7	16	43	45	−2	46	
9	Atlético Chiriquí	36	8	12	16	30	46	−16	36	
10	Independiente F.C.	36	9	8	19	34	49	−15	35	Relegation to 2015–16 Liga de Ascenso

Rules for classification: 1) points; 2) goal difference; 3) number of goals scored.
