= Cristian Zúñiga =

Colombian footballer (born 1992)

Personal information
- Full name: Cristian David Zúñiga Pino
- Date of birth: 7 May 1992
- Place of birth: Cali, Colombia
- Height: 1.77 m (5 ft 10 in)
- Position: Forward

Senior career*
Years	Team	Apps	(Gls)
2015-2016	Leones	22	(2)
2017-2019	San Francisco	87	(37)
- * Club domestic league appearances and goals

Cristian Zúñiga (born 7 May 1992) is a Colombian footballer who is first cousin of Colombian player Camilo Zúñiga who currently plays for San Francisco F. C. in Panama.

== Career ==
Zúñiga started his senior career with Leones FC of Colombia. After that, he played for San Francisco in Panama. In January 2020, he signed for Alianza Lima in the Peruvian Primera División, where he has made 12 appearances and scored zero goals.
