= Jackson Valoy =

Colombian footballer (born 1989)

Personal information
- Full name: Jackson Valoy Perea
- Date of birth: 12 July 1989 (age 37)
- Place of birth: Quibdó, Chocó, Colombia
- Height: 1.76 m (5 ft 9 1/2 in)
- Position: Defender

Team information
- Current team: Vida
- Number: 5

Senior career*
Years	Team	Apps	(Gls)
2010–12	América de Cali		
2012–13	Sporting San Miguelito	49	(3)
2014	Olimpia	4	(0)
2014–	Vida	11	(0)
- * Club domestic league appearances and goals as of 15 June 2015

Jackson Valoy Perea (born 12 July 1989) is a Colombian footballer. He currently plays as defender for C.D.S. Vida in the Liga Nacional de Fútbol Profesional de Honduras.
