= Gary Stempel =

Panamanian football manager (born 1957)

Personal information
- Full name: Gary Stempel
- Date of birth: 26 January 1957 (age 69)
- Place of birth: Panama City, Panama

Managerial career
- Years: Team
- 1996–1998: San Francisco
- 1998–2001: Panamá Viejo
- 2001–2007: San Francisco
- 2002–2003: → Panama U-20
- 2003: → Panama U-23
- 2007: Águila
- 2008–2009: Panama
- 2009–2010: San Francisco
- 2011: Guatemala U-17
- 2012–2016: San Francisco
- 2018–2019: Panama under-17
- 2018–2019: Panama (interim)
- 2020–2022: Universitario
- 2022–2024: San Francisco

Gary Stempel (born 26 January 1957) is a Panamanian football manager.

== Career ==
Prior to his move to Panama, Stempel was a community outreach officer with London club Millwall. He enjoyed his greatest success at club level in a four-year spell as manager of San Francisco, a Panamanian football club, during which he won five league titles and two championships with Panama Viejo.

It was during this time that he was also given charge of the Panama under-20 and under-23 teams. He qualified Panama to its first-ever U-20 World Cup in 2003.

In 2007, he became manager of Salvadorian club Águila and in 2008 he was given the opportunity to take charge of the Panama national team. During his tenure as national team coach, Panama won the Central American Nations Cup in 2009. It was the first time Panama had won a major international championship.

After this success, he led the team to the quarter-finals at the 2009 Gold Cup.

Stempel has also been working as a FIFA coach instructor and has conducted courses for coaches in St Kitts and Nevis, Dominica, U.S. Virgin Islands, Belize, Nicaragua and Suriname.

From 2012 to 2016, Gary Stempel was coach for the San Francisco football club located in La Chorrera, Panama.

After the 2018 FIFA World Cup, the current Panama manager, Hernán Darío Gómez, resigned. Stempel was subsequently named interim manager until Panama could appoint their next full-time manager. That manager ended up being Julio Dely Valdés.

In October 2019, Gary Stempel was awarded the Member of the Order of the British Empire for his services to youth and sport in Panama.

== Personal life ==
Stempel was born in Panama to a Panamanian father, and English mother. He moved to England at the age of 6, and remained there for 34 years holding UK citizenship, before moving back to coach San Francisco. He has an English-born wife and two daughters.
