= A.F.C. Euro Kickers =

Panamanian football team

Euro Kickers
- Full name: Asociación Fútbol Club Euro Kickers
- Nickname(s): Los Vikingos
- Founded: 1984
- Dissolved: 2002
- Ground: Estadio Rommel Fernández; Panama City, Panama
- Capacity: 25,000
- League: ANAPROF
Home colours	Away colours

A.F.C. Euro Kickers (better known as Los Vikingos) was a Panamanian football team founded in 1984 and based in Panama City, Panama. They were one of the six founding members of ANAPROF.

Los Vikingos won their lone title in the 1993 season, although they finished runners-up in 1991 and 1996–97. They were relegated at the end of the 2000–2001 season, and ceased to exist after just one season in Primera A.

== History ==
Euro Kickers was founded in 1984 by Jan Bernard Domburg, a Dutch entrepreneur then living in Panama. Four years later, they were among the six founding members of ANAPROF. One of their players at the time was Pedro Miguel González Pinzón, president of Panama's National Assembly from September 2007 to August 2008.

Less significant historically but more significant to the team's fortunes was José Ardines. A native of Panama City, Ardines was 20 years old when he signed with Euro Kickers in 1989. He would play for the club until 2001, scoring a club record 191 goals and leading the Panamanian league in scoring for six consecutive seasons (1990 to 1995–96). During that stretch, he was also the league's most valuable player three times (1990, 1992 and 1993).

The arrival of Ardines coincided with the era of greatest success for Euro Kickers. They reached the finals in 1991, finishing second to Tauro F.C. Two years later, in 1993, they won the national championship by defeating Bravos de PROJUSA 4–0. In 1996–97, the club reached one more finals, losing 1–0 to Tauro F.C. 1–0.

After that, a notable decline in the club's fortunes began. Financial issues forced the club to leave their original stadium and sell a number of their stars. The replacements were not of the same quality, and the club was nearly relegated twice before the drop finally arrived in 2000–2001. They played a season in Primera A where they were relegated to Copa Rommel Fernández and ceased to exist in 2002.

== Honours ==
- ANAPROF
  - Winners (1): 1993
  - Runners-up (2): 1991, 1992

== List of coaches ==
- (Panama) Orlando Muñoz
- (Panama) Armando Velardo
