= 2012–13 Liga Panameña de Fútbol season =

Liga Panameña de Fútbol
- Season: 2012–13
- Champions: Apertura: Árabe Unido; Clausura: Sporting San Miguelito
- Relegated: Atlético Chiriquí
- Champions League: Árabe Unido; Sporting San Miguelito

The 2012–13 Liga Panameña de Fútbol season is the 25th season of top-flight football in Panama. The season began on 20 July 2012 and is scheduled to end in May 2013. Ten teams will complete throughout the entire season.

== Teams ==
Colón C-3 finished in 10th place in the overall table last season and were relegated to the Liga Nacional de Ascenso. Taking their place for this season are the overall champions of last season's Liga Nacional de Ascenso, Río Abajo F.C.

Club	Home city	Stadium
Alianza	Panama City	Cancha Sintetica Rommel Fernández
Árabe Unido	Colón	Estadio Armando Dely Valdés
Atlético Chiriquí	David	Estadio San Cristóbal
Chepo	Chepo	Cancha Sintetica Rommel Fernández (in Panama City)
Chorrillo	Panama City	Estadio Javier Cruz
Plaza Amador	Panama City	Estadio Javier Cruz
Río Abajo	Panama City	Cancha de Entrenamiento Luis Tapia
San Francisco	La Chorrera	Estadio Agustín Sánchez
Sporting San Miguelito	San Miguelito	Estadio Bernardo Gil
Tauro	Panama City	Cancha Sintetica Rommel Fernández

== 2012 Apertura ==
The 2012 Apertura is the first tournament of the season. It began on 20 July 2012 and ended on 2 December 2012.

=== League table ===
Pos	Team	Pld	W	D	L	GF	GA	GD	Pts	Qualification
1	Río Abajo	18	9	5	4	28	20	+8	32	Qualification for playoffs
2	Árabe Unido	18	8	8	2	25	20	+5	32	Qualification for playoffs
3	Plaza Amador	18	6	8	4	22	23	−1	26	Qualification for playoffs
4	Chepo	18	5	10	3	22	18	+4	25	Qualification for playoffs
5	Chorrillo	18	5	10	3	22	19	+3	25	
6	Tauro	18	5	6	7	25	27	−2	21	
7	Sporting San Miguelito	18	4	8	6	14	17	−3	20	
8	San Francisco	18	4	6	8	20	22	−2	18	
9	Alianza	18	4	6	8	21	24	−3	18	
10	Atlético Chiriquí	18	2	9	7	14	23	−9	15	

Updated to match(es) played on 1 October 2013. Source:
Rules for classification: 1) points; 2) goal difference; 3) number of goals scored.

=== Semi-finals ===
==== First leg ====
17 November 2012
13:00 UTC−6

Plaza Amador	1–3	Árabe Unido
Temístocles Perez 57'		Jose Gonzales 13'; Abdiel Arroyo Molinar 58' 77'

Estadio Rommel Fernández Gutiérrez, Panama City

20 November 2012
12:00 UTC−6

Chepo FC	2–0	Río Abajo
Bernando Palma Taylor 36', Romario Antonio Piggott 44'

Estadio Profesor Javier Cruz, Panama City
Referee: Roberto Moreno

==== Second leg ====
28 November 2012
12:00 UTC−6

Árabe Unido	2–0	Plaza Amador
David Daniels 34'; Orlando Rodriguez 52'

Estadio Armando Dely Valdés, Colon
Referee: Ameth Sanchez

Arabe Unido won 5-1 on aggregate.

24 November 2012
13:00 UTC−6

Río Abajo F.C.	1–1	Chepo
Jose Gonzalez 88'		Bernardo Palma Taylor 78'

Estadio Rommel Fernández Gutiérrez, Panama City

Chepo FC won 3-1 on aggregate.

=== Final ===
2 December 2012
15:00 UTC−5

Chepo	1–4	Árabe Unido
Ricardo Romero 29'		Orlando Rodriguez 24' 25'; Abdiel Arroyo Molinar 42'; Jose Gonzalez 60'

Estadio Rommel Fernández, Panama City
Referee: John Francis Pitty

2012 Apertura champion

10th title

=== Top goalscorers ===
No.	Player	Team	Goals
1	(Panama) Jorman Aguilar	Río Abajo	10
2	(Panama) Edwin Aguilar	Tauro	10
3	(Panama) Anthony Basile	Río Abajo	8
4	(Panama) Bernando Palma	Chepo	6
5	(Panama) Cesar Medina	Alianza	5
6	(Panama) Armando Polo	San Francisco	4
7	(Panama) Renán Yoriel Addles	Chorillo	4
8	(Panama) Rene Campbell	Alianza	4
9	(Paraguay) Julio Castillo	Chepo FC	4
10	(Panama) Angel Lombardo	Deportivo Plaza Amador	4

== 2013 Clausura ==
=== League table ===
Pos	Team	Pld	W	D	L	GF	GA	GD	Pts	Qualification
1	Tauro	18	10	3	5	30	25	+5	33	Qualification for playoffs
2	San Francisco	18	9	5	4	27	21	+6	32	Qualification for playoffs
3	Árabe Unido	18	7	6	5	18	14	+4	27	Qualification for playoffs
4	Sporting San Miguelito	18	8	3	7	19	18	+1	27	Qualification for playoffs
5	Río Abajo	18	7	5	6	24	24	0	26	
6	Plaza Amador	18	6	7	5	21	18	+3	25	
7	Chorrillo	18	7	3	8	25	28	−3	24	
8	Alianza	18	4	10	4	13	10	+3	22	
9	Atlético Chiriquí	18	2	9	7	18	24	−6	15	
10	Chepo	18	2	5	11	12	25	−13	11	

Updated to match(es) played on 1 October 2013. Source:
Rules for classification: 1) points; 2) goal difference; 3) number of goals scored.

=== Semi-finals ===
==== First leg ====
5 May 2013
7:00 UTC−6

Árabe Unido	0–0	San Francisco F.C.

Estadio Armando Dely Valdés, Colon

5 May 2013
11:00 UTC−6

Sporting San Miguelito	2–1	Tauro
Gabriel Ríos 59', Ricardo Clarke 77'		Miguel Castillo 14'

Estadio Rommel Fernández Gutiérrez, Panama City
Referee: Roberto Moreno

==== Second leg ====
11 May 2013
12:00 UTC−6

San Francisco	2–1	Árabe Unido
Eybri Bonaga 7'; Boris Alfaro 66'		Abdiel Arroyo 72'

Estadio Agustín Muquita Sánchez, La Chorrera
Referee: John Pitty

San Francisco won 2-1 on aggregate.

11 May 2013
12:00 UTC−6

Tauro F.C.	1–1	Sporting San Miguelito
Miguel Castillo 86'		Ricardo Clarke 64'

Estadio Rommel Fernández Gutiérrez, Panama City
Referee: Roberto Moreno

Sporting San Miguelito won 3-2 on aggregate.

=== Final ===
19 May 2013
15:00 UTC−5

San Francisco	1–4	Sporting San Miguelito
Amílcar James 10'	[]	Darwin Pinzon 7' 47'; Ricardo Clarke 3'; Julio Andrade 93'

Estadio Rommel Fernández, Panama City
Referee: Roberto Moreno

2013 Clasura champion

1st title

=== Top goalscorers ===
No.	Player	Team	Goals
1	(Panama) Johnny Ruiz	Chorillo	9
2	(Panama) Luis Gabriel Rentería	Tauro	8
3	(Panama) Ricardo Clarke	Sporting San Miguelito	7
4	(Panama) Angel Lombardo	Plaza Amador	7
5	(Panama) José Luis Garcés	San Francisco	6
6	(Panama) René Víctor Mendieta Jr	Chepo	6
7	(Panama) Anthony Basile	Río Abajo	5
8	(Colombia) Juan Osorio	Alianza	5
9	(Panama) Armando Polo	Río Abajo	5
10	(Panama) Edwin Aguilar	Tauro	4

== Aggregate table ==
Pos	Team	Pld	W	D	L	GF	GA	GD	Pts	Qualification or relegation
1	Árabe Unido	36	15	14	7	43	34	+9	59	Qualification for 2013–14 CONCACAF Champions League Group Stage
2	Río Abajo	36	16	10	10	51	43	+8	58	
3	Plaza Amador	36	12	15	9	43	41	+2	51	
4	Tauro	36	15	9	12	55	52	+3	54	
5	San Francisco	36	13	11	12	47	43	+4	50	
6	Chorrillo	36	12	13	11	47	47	0	49	
7	Sporting San Miguelito	36	12	11	13	33	35	−2	47	Qualification for 2013–14 CONCACAF Champions League Group Stage
8	Alianza	36	8	16	12	34	34	0	40	
9	Chepo	36	7	15	14	34	43	−9	36	
10	Atlético Chiriquí	36	4	18	14	32	47	−15	30	Relegation to 2012–13 Liga de Ascenso

Rules for classification: 1) points; 2) goal difference; 3) number of goals scored.
