= Alfredo Stephens =

Panamanian football player (born 1994)

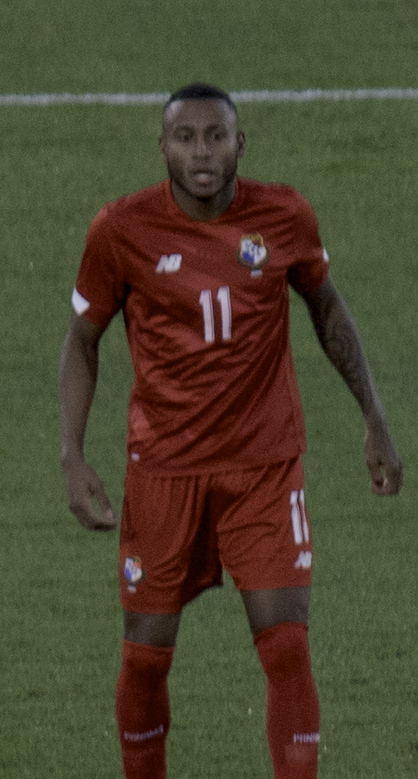
- Stephens in 2022

Personal information
- Full name: Alfredo Horacio Stephens Francis
- Date of birth: 25 December 1994 (age 31)
- Place of birth: Panama City, Panama
- Height: 1.78 m (5 ft 10 in)
- Position: Attacking midfielder

Team information
- Current team: Maccabi Akhi Nazareth
- Number: 11

Youth career
- Río Abajo

Senior career*
Years	Team	Apps	(Gls)
2012–2013	Río Abajo	13	(2)
2013–2014	Plaza Amador	35	(7)
2014–2021	Chorrillo	79	(19)
2015–2016	→ DAC Dunajská Streda (loan)	17	(1)
2017–2018	→ Santa Clara (loan)	22	(0)
2019–2020	→ Universitario (loan)	7	(1)
2020–2021	Independiente	12	(7)
2021	Aragua	27	(12)
2022	9 de Octubre	12	(0)
2023	Academia Puerto Cabello	31	(10)
2023–2025	Ironi Kiryat Shmona	62	(19)
2025–2026	Shimizu S-Pulse	11	(0)
2026–	Maccabi Akhi Nazareth	8	(2)

International career^{‡}
2011	Panama U17	4	(0)
2012–	Panama	26	(1)
- * Club domestic league appearances and goals as of 29 June 2025 ‡ National team caps and goals as of 17:24, 10 December 2023 (UTC)

Alfredo Horacio Stephens Francis (born 25 December 1994) is a Panamanian professional footballer who plays as an attacking midfielder for Maccabi Akhi Nazareth and the Panama national football team.

== Club career ==
In summer 2014, Stephens joined Chorrillo from Plaza Amador. In July 2015, he moved abroad to play for Slovak side DAC Dunajská Streda.

== International career ==
Stephens played at the 2011 U-17 World Cup in Mexico.

Stephens made his senior debut for Panama in an unofficial May 2012 friendly match against Guyana, his first official match being an August 2014 friendly against Peru. As of 15 August 2015, he has earned a total of six caps, scoring no goals. He represented his country at the 2015 CONCACAF Gold Cup.

=== International goals ===
Scores and results list Panama's goal tally first.

No	Date	Venue	Opponent	Score	Result	Competition
1.	24 October 2017	Kirani James Athletic Stadium, St. George's, Grenada	Grenada	2–0	5–0	Friendly

== Honours ==
Panama

- CONCACAF Gold Cup third place: 2015
