= 2013–14 Liga Panameña de Fútbol season =

Liga Panameña de Fútbol
- Season: 2013–14
- Champions: Apertura: Tauro; Clausura: Chorrillo F.C.
- Relegated: TBD
- Champions League: Tauro; Chorrillo F.C.

The 2013–14 Liga Panameña de Fútbol season was the 25th season of top-flight football in Panama. The season began on 20 July 2013 and was scheduled to end in May 2014. Ten teams competed throughout the entire season.

== Teams ==
Atlético Chiriquí finished in 10th place in the overall table last season and were relegated to the Liga Nacional de Ascenso. Taking their place for this season are the overall champions of last season's Liga Nacional de Ascenso Independiente F.C.

Club	Home city	Stadium
Alianza	Panama City	Cancha de Entrenamiento Luis Tapia
Árabe Unido	Colón	Cancha de Entrenamiento Luis Tapia (in Panama City)
Chepo	Chepo	Cancha de Entrenamiento Luis Tapia (in Panama City)
Chorrillo	Panama City	Estadio Javier Cruz
Independiente F.C.	La Chorrera	Estadio Agustín Sánchez
Plaza Amador	Panama City	Estadio Javier Cruz
Rio Abajo	Panama City	Cancha de Entrenamiento Luis Tapia
San Francisco	La Chorrera	Estadio Agustín Sánchez
Sporting San Miguelito	San Miguelito	Cancha de Entrenamiento Luis Tapia
Tauro	Panama City	Cancha de Entrenamiento Luis Tapia

== 2013 Apertura ==
=== Standings ===
Pos	Team	Pld	W	D	L	GF	GA	GD	Pts	Qualification
1	Tauro	18	12	2	4	24	12	+12	38	Qualified to the Final Round
2	Plaza Amador	18	10	3	5	20	14	+6	33	Qualified to the Final Round
3	San Francisco	18	9	4	5	20	12	+8	31	Qualified to the Final Round
4	Independiente	18	8	4	6	24	19	+5	28	Qualified to the Final Round
5	Chepo	18	8	4	6	19	17	+2	28	
6	Chorrillo	18	6	7	5	17	19	−2	25	
7	Árabe Unido	18	6	5	7	17	16	+1	23	
8	Sporting San Miguelito	18	6	2	10	22	26	−4	20	
9	Alianza	18	4	4	10	11	20	−9	16	
10	Rio Abajo	18	2	3	13	9	28	−19	9	

Updated to match(es) played on 11 November 2013. Source: Soccerway
Rules for classification: 1) points; 2) goal difference; 3) number of goals scored.

=== Results ===
Home \ Away	ALI	DÁU	CHE	CHO	IND	PA	RA	SF	SSM	TAU
Alianza		2–0	0–1	1–1	1–3	0–1	0–2	2–1	1–0	0–2
Árabe Unido	0–0		1–0	1–1	0–2	0–1	1–0	1–1	2–0	0–2
Chepo	1–0	0–0		1–2	2–1	0–0	2–0	1–0	2–4	2–1
Chorrillo	0–0	1–1	1–0		1–1	1–1	3–1	0–2	0–3	1–2
Independiente	2–1	2–1	1–2	0–0		0–1	2–0	0–2	3–1	2–1
Plaza Amador	0–1	2–0	1–2	1–2	2–1		1–0	1–0	3–2	0–1
Rio Abajo	1–0	0–4	1–1	0–1	1–1	0–2		0–1	0–2	1–2
San Francisco	1–0	1–0	2–1	0–1	1–1	1–1	2–1		3–0	0–1
Sporting San Miguelito	3–1	0–3	1–0	2–0	1–2	1–2	1–1	1–1		0–1
Tauro	1–1	1–2	1–1	2–1	1–0	2–0	2–0	0–1	1–0	

Updated to match(es) played on 1 November 2013. Source: Soccerway
Legend: Blue = home team win; Yellow = draw; Red = away team win.

=== Semifinals ===
==== First leg ====
15 November 2013
20:00 UTC-5

San Francisco	1 – 1	Plaza Amador
Eduardo Jiménez 90'	Report	Josueth Holder 13'

Estadio Agustín Sánchez

16 November 2013
20:00 UTC-5

Independiente	0 – 1	Tauro
	Report	Israel Sanjur 90+1'

Estadio Agustín Sánchez

==== Second leg ====
23 November 2013
20:00 UTC-5

Plaza Amador	1 – 3 (a.e.t.)	San Francisco
Yamir Vergara 79' (pen.)	Report	José Luis Garcés 29'; Eduardo Jimenez 98'; Roberto Brown 108'

Estadio Rommel Fernández, Panama City

22 November 2013
21:00 UTC-5

Tauro	3 – 2 (a.e.t.)	Independiente
Israel Sanjur 62'; Miguel Castillo 102'; Marcos Sánchez 117'	Report	Hector Peñaloza 39' 67'

Estadio Rommel Fernández, Panama City

=== Final ===
29 November 2013
21:00 UTC-5

San Francisco	0 – 1	Tauro FC
	Report	Israel Sanjur 27'

Estadio Rommel Fernández, Panama City
Referee: John Pitti

Apertura 2013 champions

12th title

== List of foreign players in the league ==
This is a list of foreign players in Apertura 2013. The following players:

1. have played at least one apertura game for the respective club.
2. have not been capped for the Panama national football team on any level, independently from the birthplace

Alianza

- (Colombia) Juan Osorio
- (Colombia) Victor Sanchez
- (Colombia) Eder Nilson
- (Colombia) victor Isaza
- (Colombia) Diego Medina
- (Colombia) Juan Ospina

Arabe Unido

- (Italy) David Leon
- (Colombia) Bryan Flores
- (Colombia) Jonathan Chavera
- (Dominican Republic) Miguel Lloyd
- (Dominican Republic) Erick Ozuna
- (Uruguay) Mauro Aguilar

Chepo

- (Argentina) Gianni Baggini
- (Colombia) David Perez
- (Colombia) Alexander Moreno
- (Colombia) Manuel Bocanegra
- (Colombia) Anderson Diaz

Chorillo

- (Argentina) Pedro Reyna
- (Brazil) Caio Jose Milan
- (Colombia) Miguel Duque
- (Colombia) Justin Arboleda

Plaza Amador

- (Colombia) Jean Palacios

(player released mid season)

Independiente

- (Argentina) Mauricio Munoz
- (Colombia) Luis Martinez
- (Colombia) Carlos Lopez Sierra
- (Colombia) Luis Fernando Escobar

Rio Abajo

- (Colombia) Jhuanne Gonzales
- (Colombia) Juan Banguera
- (Colombia) Carlos Alberto Cordoba
- (Colombia) Freddy Isaza
- (Colombia) Jose Gonzales
- (Colombia) Darwin Mena
- (Colombia) Luis Rojas
- (Colombia) Stewar Figueroa

San Francisco FC

- (Colombia) William Negrete
- (Colombia) Edinson Eduardo Villalba
- (Colombia) Yezid Zapata

Sporting San Miguelito

- (Colombia) Julian Campos
- (Colombia) Nicolas Ortega
- (Colombia) Jackson Valoy
- (Ecuador) Pablo Andres Ochoa

Tauro FC

- (Argentina) Pablo Gabriel Gallardo
- (Colombia) Jorge Lenis
- (Colombia) Reneil Herrera
- (Colombia) Nilson Castañeda
- (Colombia) Enrique Perez
- (Colombia) Julian Agressot

== 2014 Clausura ==
=== Team information ===
Last updated: June 28, 2013

=== Personnel and sponsoring (2014 Clausura) ===
Team	Chairman	Head coach	Kitmaker	Shirt sponsor
Alianza	TBD	(Costa Rica) Carlos Pérez Porras	TBD	TBD
Árabe Unido	TBA	(Colombia) Jair Palacios	TBD	TBD
Chepo	TBD	(Panama) Felipe Fuentes	TBD	TBD
Chorrillo		(Panama) Julio Medina III	TBD	TBD
Independiente		(Colombia) Franklin Narváez	TBD	TBD
Plaza Amador	TBD	(United States) (Panama) Mike Stump	TBD	TBD
Rio Abajo		(Colombia) Richard Parra	TBD	TBD
San Francisco	Julio Quijano	(England) (Panama) Gary Stempel	TBD	TBD
Sporting San Miguelito	TBD	(Panama) José Anthony “ Chalate” Torres	TBD	TBD
Tauro	TBD	(Panama) Rolando Palma	TBD	TBD

=== Standings ===
Pos	Team	Pld	W	D	L	GF	GA	GD	Pts	Qualification
1	Árabe Unido (A)	18	9	7	2	27	12	+15	34	Qualified to the Semifinals
2	Chorrillo (A)	18	8	7	3	28	16	+12	31	Qualified to the Semifinals
3	Plaza Amador (A)	18	7	9	2	13	9	+4	30	Qualified to the Semifinals
4	Rio Abajo (A)	18	6	8	4	20	16	+4	26	Qualified to the Semifinals
5	San Francisco	18	7	4	7	18	15	+3	25	
6	Sporting San Miguelito	18	6	6	6	20	26	−6	24	
7	Alianza	18	6	4	8	18	23	−5	22	
8	Tauro	18	5	6	7	16	17	−1	21	
9	Chepo	18	3	5	10	17	24	−7	14	
10	Independiente	18	3	4	11	13	32	−19	13	

Updated to match(es) played on 27 April 2014. Source: Soccerway
Rules for classification: 1) points; 2) goal difference; 3) number of goals scored.
(A) Advance to a further round

=== Results ===
Home \ Away	ALI	DÁU	CHE	CHO	IND	PA	RA	SF	SSM	TAU
Alianza		2–4	1–0	0–3	1–0	0–1	2–2	2–1	1–1	0–1
Árabe Unido	1–1		1–0	2–3	4–0	0–0	1–2	1–0	2–1	0–0
Chepo	2–0	1–1		2–2	3–1	0–0	1–1	1–2	0–1	0–2
Chorrillo	1–3	0–0	1–0		1–1	0–0	1–3	0–1	3–0	2–1
Independiente	0–2	0–5	3–1	1–3		0–1	0–0	0–1	0–1	2–1
Plaza Amador	1–0	1–1	1–0	1–1	1–1		1–0	2–1	0–0	0–0
Rio Abajo	0–1	0–0	2–1	1–1	2–1	2–0		0–1	0–1	1–1
San Francisco	2–0	0–1	3–0	0–0	0–1	1–1	2–2		1–2	1–1
Sporting San Miguelito	2–2	1–2	1–4	0–3	2–2	2–1	1–1	1–0		1–2
Tauro	1–0	0–1	1–1	0–3	3–0	0–1	0–1	0–1	2–2	

Updated to match(es) played on 27 April 2014. Source: Soccerway
Legend: Blue = home team win; Yellow = draw; Red = away team win.

=== Semifinals ===
==== First leg ====
2 May 2014
21:00 UTC-5

Rio Abajo	3 – 0	Árabe Unido
Basile 36' (pen.); Rodríguez 84', 90+4'	Report

Estadio Rommel Fernandez, Panama City
Referee: Jafeth Perea

6 May 2014
20:00 UTC-5

Plaza Amador	1 – 0	Chorrillo
Stephens 90+2'	Report

Estadio Rommel Fernandez, Panama City
Referee: Ameth Sánchez

==== Second leg ====
9 May 2014
21:00 UTC-5

Árabe Unido	0 – 1	Rio Abajo
	Report	Basile 60'

Estadio Rommel Fernández, Panama City
Referee: Ameth Sánchez

10 May 2014
20:00 UTC-5

Chorrillo	1 – 0	Plaza Amador
Moreno 67'	Report
Penalties
	5 – 4

Nuevo Estadio Maracaná de Panama, Panama City
Referee: Rolando Vidal

=== Final ===
17 May 2014
20:00 UTC-5

Chorrillo	1 – 0	Rio Abajo

Estadio Rommel Fernández, Panama City

Clausura 2014 champions

2nd title

== List of foreign players in the league ==
This is a list of foreign players in Clausura 2014. The following players:

1. have played at least one apertura game for the respective club.
2. have not been capped for the Panama national football team on any level, independently from the birthplace .

Alianza

- (Argentina) Facundo Crock (Reserves)
- (Colombia) Eder Nilson Paredez
- (Colombia) Christian Mesa
- (Colombia) Juan Pablo Cifuentes

Arabe Unido

- (Colombia) Jhon Ramírez Pombo
- (Colombia) Jorge Quintero
- (Dominican Republic) Miguel Lloyd

Chepo

- None

Chorillo

- (Colombia) Yustin Buenaños
- (Mexico) Mario Hernández
- (Mexico) Ricardo Jiménez

Plaza Amador

- (Colombia) Ariel Bonilla
- (Paraguay) Julio Castillo

(player released mid season)

Independiente

- (Argentina) Mauricio Munoz
- (Colombia) Carlos Lopez Sierra
- (Colombia) Luis Fernando Escobar

Rio Abajo

- (Colombia) Johnatan Mosquera
- (Colombia) Davison Atehortua
- (Colombia) Jose Gonzales
- (Colombia) Lucas Arias

San Francisco FC

- (Colombia) William Negrete
- (Colombia) Edinson Eduardo Villalba
- (Paraguay) José Aquino Allende

Sporting San Miguelito

- None

Tauro Fc

- (Colombia) Reneil Herrera
- (Colombia) Jan Bryan Contreras
- (Nicaragua) Axel Villanueva
