= Julio Medina III =

Panamanian footballer (born 1976)

Personal information
- Full name: Julio Antonio Medina III Morales
- Date of birth: 14 July 1976 (age 50)
- Place of birth: Panama City, Panama
- Height: 1.58 m (5 ft 2 in)
- Position: Attacking midfielder

Team information
- Current team: Chorrillo (manager)

Youth career
- Santa Gema

Senior career*
Years	Team	Apps	(Gls)
1996–2004	Árabe Unido	80	(22)
2004–2005	Águila	32	(8)
2005	Comunicaciones	29	(7)
2006	Marathón		
2006–2007	Árabe Unido	33	(4)
2007–2010	Chorrillo	76	(18)
2011–2012	Árabe Unido		

International career^{‡}
1999–2008	Panama	44	(0)

Managerial career
- 2014–2015: Chorrillo
- * Club domestic league appearances and goals as of 31 July 2006 ‡ National team caps and goals as of 10 June 2015

Julio Antonio Medina Morales, also known as Julio Medina III (born 14 July 1976), is a Panamanian former professional footballer who played as a midfielder.

He manages the Liga Panameña de Futbol team Chorrillo.

== Club career ==
Nicknamed Puchito, Medina started his career at Árabe Unido and played in Uruguay for Nacional and Platense before moving abroad again to join Salvadoran side Águila in December 2004. He left them in summer 2005 for Guatemalan giants Comunicaciones, only to leave them after a season for Honduran outfit Marathón where he played alongside compatriot Donaldo González.

After a return to Árabe Unido, the little free-kick specialist joined Chorrillo in January 2007, the only other club he played for in Panama.

== International career ==
Medina made his debut for Panama in an October 1999 friendly match against Trinidad and Tobago and has earned a total of 44 caps, scoring no goals. He represented his country in 21 FIFA World Cup qualification matches and was a member of the 2005 CONCACAF Gold Cup team, who finished second in the tournament.

His final international was a June 2008 friendly match against Canada.

== Managerial career ==
After retiring, Medina was named assistant at Árabe Unido and later became manager of Chorrillo and immediately won the 2014 Clausura. He was released by Chorrillo in April 2015.

== Honours ==
Panama

- CONCACAF Gold Cup runner-up: 2005
