= 2015–16 Liga Panameña de Fútbol season =

Liga Panameña de Fútbol
- Season: 2015–16
- Champions: Apertura: Árabe Unido; Clausura: Plaza Amador
- Relegated: Atlético Chiriquí
- Champions League: Árabe Unido; Plaza Amador
- Biggest home win: Árabe Unido 8-1 Atlético Chiriquí
- Biggest away win: Atlético Nacional 1-5 Atlético Chiriquí
- Highest scoring: Árabe Unido 8-1 Atlético Chiriquí

The 2015–16 Liga Panameña de Fútbol season (also known as the Liga Cable Onda) was the 26th season of top-flight football in Panama. The season began on 2015 and ended in May 2016. Ten teams competed throughout the entire season.

== Teams ==
Independiente F.C. finished in 10th place in the overall table last season and were relegated to the Liga Nacional de Ascenso. Taking their place for this season are the overall champions of last season's Liga Nacional de Ascenso Atlético Nacional.

Club	Home city	Stadium
Alianza	Panama City	Cancha de Entrenamiento Luis Tapia
Árabe Unido	Colón	Cancha de Entrenamiento Luis Tapia (in Panama City)
Atlético Chiriquí	David, Chiriquí	Estadio San Cristóbal
Atlético Nacional	Panama City	Estadio Agustín "Muquita" Sánchez
Chepo	Chepo	Cancha de Entrenamiento Luis Tapia (in Panama City)
Chorrillo	Panama City	Estadio Javier Cruz
Plaza Amador	Panama City	Estadio Javier Cruz
San Francisco	La Chorrera	Estadio Agustín Sánchez
Sporting San Miguelito	San Miguelito	Cancha de Entrenamiento Luis Tapia
Tauro	Panama City	Cancha de Entrenamiento Luis Tapia

== 2015 Apertura ==
=== Personnel and sponsoring (2015 Apertura) ===
Team	Chairman	Head coach	Kitmaker	Shirt sponsor
Alianza	TBD	(Colombia) Juan Pablo Lopera	Lotto	Balboa
Árabe Unido	TBD	(Colombia) Juan Sergio Guzmán	Puma	Pizza Hut
Atlético Chiriquí		(Costa Rica) Javier Wanchope	Mitre	ShowPro
Atletico Nacional		(Colombia) Daniel Valencia	Lotto	Subway
Chepo	TBD	(Panama) Jorge Santos	GEMS	EGS, NCO
Chorrillo		(Panama) Mike Stump	Lotto	McDonald's, Cremoso
Plaza Amador	TBD	(Spain) Juan Carlos García	Diadora	Páguela Facil, Frosquito, Mercana
San Francisco	Julio Quijano	(England) (Panama) Gary Stempel	Lotto	KFC, Canon, Banco General
Sporting San Miguelito	TBD	(Panama) José Anthony "Chalate" Torres	Joma	Kenwood, Hyundai
Tauro	TBD	(Panama) Jorge Dely Valdés	Patrick	Publicar Páginas Amarillas

=== Beginning of the season ===
Team	Outgoing manager	Manner of departure	Date of vacancy	Replaced by	Date of appointment	Position in table
Chorrillo	(Panama) Julio Medina III	TBD	2015	(Panama) Mike Stump	8 May 2015	th (TBD)
Tauro	(Panama) Mike Stump	Sacked	2015	(Panama) Jorge Dely Valdés	2015	th (TBD)

=== During the season ===
Team	Outgoing manager	Manner of departure	Date of vacancy	Replaced by	Date of appointment	Position in table
Alianza	(Colombia) Juan Carlos Lopera	Resigned	September 21, 2015	(Panama) Rúben Cardenas Rosales	September 21, 2015	10th (Apertura 2015)
Atlético Chiriquí	(Costa Rica) Javier Wanchope	Resigned	October 12, 2015	(Panama) Iván González	October 12, 2015	th (Apertura 2015)
Tauro F.C.	(Panama) Jorge Dely Valdés	Sacked	October 21, 2015	(Panama) Rolando Palma	October 21, 2015	th (Apertura 2015)

=== Standings ===
Pos	Team	Pld	W	D	L	GF	GA	GD	Pts	Qualification
1	Árabe Unido	18	12	3	3	30	15	+15	39	Qualified to the Final Round
2	Chorrillo	18	8	5	5	23	15	+8	29	Qualified to the Final Round
3	Chepo	18	7	6	5	24	19	+5	27	Qualified to the Final Round
4	Plaza Amador	18	7	5	6	19	17	+2	26	Qualified to the Final Round
5	Sporting San Miguelito	18	6	6	6	27	25	+2	24	
6	Tauro	18	6	5	7	15	16	−1	23	
7	Atlético Nacional	18	6	4	8	20	26	−6	22	
8	San Francisco	18	5	6	7	16	18	−2	21	
9	Alianza	18	6	2	10	18	27	−9	20	
10	Atlético Chiriquí	18	2	8	8	17	31	−14	14	

Updated to match(es) played on 2015. Source:
Rules for classification: 1) points; 2) goal difference; 3) number of goals scored.

=== Results ===
Home \ Away	ALI	ATL	DÁU	CHI	CHE	CHO	PA	SF	SSM	TAU
Alianza		2–4	2–1	1–0	2–1	3–1	0–3	1–0	1–2	2–1
Atlético Nacional	1–0		0–1	2–2	0–2	1–1	2–1	1–0	1–2	1–3
Árabe Unido	2–0	1–0		8–1	1–0	2–1	1–0	3–2	1–0	2–1
Atlético Chiriquí	0–0	2–2	1–2		1–1	1–0	1–1	2–2	2–1	0–1
Chepo	2–0	3–0	2–1	1–1		1–1	3–1	1–1	2–5	0–0
Chorrillo	1–1	2–0	2–0	2–0	2–1		0–0	2–1	1–2	2–1
Plaza Amador	2–1	0–1	0–0	3–1	0–1	1–0		1–0	2–2	1–0
San Francisco	2–1	2–2	1–1	0–0	1–0	0–2	2–0		1–0	0–0
Sporting San Miguelito	2–1	1–2	1–2	3–2	2–2	0–0	2–2	0–1		0–0
Tauro	2–0	1–0	1–1	1–0	0–1	0–3	0–1	1–0	2–2	

Updated to match(es) played on 2015. Source:
Legend: Blue = home team win; Yellow = draw; Red = away team win.

=== Second stage ===
Semifinals
1	Árabe Unido	1	2	3
4	Plaza Amador	2	0	2
2	Chorrillo	1	1	2 (3)
3	Chepo	1	1	2 (1)

Final
1	Árabe Unido	1 (3)
3	Chorrillo	1 (0)

==== Semifinals ====
First legs

22 November 2015

Chepo	1-2	Chorrillo
Sergio Moreno 13' (pen.); 74'		José Luis González 70'

Estadio Oscar Suman Carrillo
Referee: Luis Rodriguez

23 November 2015

Plaza Amador	2-1	Árabe Unido
Valentin Pimentel 3'; Miguel Escobar 51'		Abdiel Macea 35'

Estadio Maracana de Panama
Referee: Rolando Vidal

Second legs

28 November 2015
13:00

Árabe Unido	2-0	Plaza Amador
Armando Polo 15'; Abdiel Arroyo 34'		None

Estadio Armando Dely Valdés, Colon
Referee: Jafeth Perea

Arabe Unido won 3–2 on aggregate.

29 November 2015
11:00

Chorrillo	0-1	Chepo
None		José Luis González 46'

Estadio Maracaná de Panamá, Panama City
Referee: Ameth Sanchez

Chorrillio drew 2-2 on aggregate, they won in pen 4-3.

==== Finals ====
Grand Final

December 6, 2015

Árabe Unido	1-1	Chorrillo
Abdiel Arroyo 19'		Luis Jaramillo 60'
Penalties
Jose Gonzales "pibe" (penalty scored); Fidel Caesar (penalty scored); Abdiel Arroyo (penalty scored)	3-0	Humberto Ward (penalty missed); Miguel Camargo (penalty missed); Sergio Moreno (penalty missed)

Estadio Rommel Fernandez, Panama City
Referee: John Pitti

Apertura 2015 champions

14th title

== List of foreign players in the league ==
This is a list of foreign players in Apertura 2015. The following players:

1. have played at least one apertura game for the respective club.
2. have not been capped for the Panama national football team on any level, independently from the birthplace

Alianza

- (Argentina) Facundo Kroeck
- (Colombia) Robyn Pertuz
- (Colombia) Gerardo Negrete
- (Colombia) Mauricio Castaño

Arabe Unido

- (Dominican Republic) Miguel Lloyd

Chepo

- (Colombia) Miguel Duque

Chorillo

- (Brazil) Caio Milan
- (Brazil) Fabio da Silva
- (Colombia) Jorge Henriquez

Plaza Amador

- (Spain) Ismael Remacha
- (Colombia) Ezequiel Palomeque
- (Colombia) Ariel Bonilla
- (Paraguay) Julio César Castillo

(player released mid season)

Atlético Chiriquí

- (Costa Rica) Erick Araya Godines
- (Colombia) Pablo César Murillo
- (Colombia) Ánderson Diaz

Atletico Nacional

- (Colombia) Manuel Murillo
- (Colombia) Andrés Santamaría

San Francisco FC

- None

Sporting San Miguelito

- None

Tauro FC

- (Colombia) Varcan Sterling
- (Colombia) Carlos Sierra
- (Colombia) Richard Ibargüen
- (Colombia) Carlos Mosquera

== 2016 Clausura ==
=== Personnel and sponsoring (2016 Clausura) ===
Team	Chairman	Head coach	Kitmaker	Shirt sponsor
Alianza	TBD	(Panama) Rubén Cárdenas x	Lotto	Balboa
Árabe Unido	TBD	(Colombia) Juan Sergio Guzmán	Puma	Pizza Hut
Atlético Chiriquí		(Panama) Mario Mendez x	Mitre	ShowPro
Atletico Nacional		(Colombia) Daniel Valencia	Lotto	Subway
Chepo	TBD	(Panama) Jorge Santos x	GEMS	EGS, NCO
Chorrillo		(Panama) Mike Stump x	Lotto	McDonald's, Cremoso
Plaza Amador	TBD	(Colombia) Jair Palacios x	Diadora	Páguela Facil, Frosquito, Mercana
San Francisco	Julio Quijano	(England) (Panama) Gary Stempel x	Lotto	KFC, Canon, Banco General
Sporting San Miguelito	TBD	(Panama) José Anthony "Chalate" Torres	TBD	Kenwood, Hyundai
Tauro	TBD	(Panama) Rolando Palma x	TBD	Publicar Páginas Amarillas

=== Standings ===
Pos	Team	Pld	W	D	L	GF	GA	GD	Pts	Qualification
1	Atlético Nacional	18	9	5	4	23	21	+2	32	Qualified to the Final Round
2	Plaza Amador	18	7	8	3	16	9	+7	29	Qualified to the Final Round
3	Árabe Unido	18	8	3	7	20	17	+3	27	Qualified to the Final Round
4	Chorrillo	18	7	5	6	20	16	+4	26	Qualified to the Final Round
5	Atlético Chiriquí	18	7	5	6	19	17	+2	26	
6	Tauro	18	6	5	7	15	17	−2	23	
7	Chepo	18	6	4	8	18	23	−5	22	
8	Sporting San Miguelito	18	5	6	7	16	21	−5	21	
9	San Francisco	18	5	5	8	20	23	−3	20	
10	Alianza	18	6	2	10	19	22	−3	20	

Updated to match(es) played on 8 May 2016. Source:
Rules for classification: 1) points; 2) goal difference; 3) number of goals scored.

=== Results ===
Home \ Away	ALI	ATL	DÁU	CHI	CHE	CHO	PA	SF	SSM	TAU
Alianza		0–2	2–0	0–2	0–2	2–3	1–1	2–1	2–1	0–0
Atlético Nacional	3–2		2–0	1–5	2–2	1–0	0–4	3–0	0–2	0–0
Árabe Unido	1–0	1–2		1–0	1–0	2–1	1–2	3–0	2–2	1–0
Atlético Chiriquí	2–1	0–3	0–1		0–1	0–2	0–0	1–0	1–1	1–0
Chepo	0–3	1–2	1–0	0–1		0–2	1–1	1–1	1–0	3–1
Chorrillo	1–0	0–0	0–4	3–3	3–0		0–1	1–1	1–0	0–1
Plaza Amador	1–0	0–0	0–0	0–0	1–1	1–0		0–1	2–0	2–1
San Francisco	1–2	3–0	2–0	1–1	2–4	0–0	1–0		1–2	0–0
Sporting San Miguelito	0–2	1–1	1–1	0–1	1–0	0–3	0–0	2–1		2–2
Tauro	1–0	0–1	2–1	2–1	2–0	0–0	2–0	1–4	0–1	

Updated to match(es) played on 3 March 2016. Source:
Legend: Blue = home team win; Yellow = draw; Red = away team win.

=== Second stage ===
Semifinals
1	Atletico Nacional	0	0	0
4	Chorrillo	0	3	3
2	Árabe Unido	2	0	2
3	Plaza Amador	0	3	3

Final
4	Chorrillo	0
3	Plaza Amador	1

==== Semifinals ====
First legs

11 May 2016

Árabe Unido	2-0	Plaza Amador
Joseph Cox 22'; Armando Cooper 35'	None	None

Estadio Armando Dely Valdés, Colón
Referee: Ameth Sanchez

12 May 2016

Chorrillo	0-0	Atletico Nacional
None		None

Nuevo Estadio Maracaná de Panamá, Panama City
Referee: Rolando Vidal

Second legs

15 May 2016

Plaza Amador	3-0	Árabe Unido
Ricaurte Barsallo 9'; 116'; Ernesto Sinclair 48'		None

Nuevo Estadio Maracaná de Panamá, Panama City
Referee: Victor Rios

Plaza Amador won 3–2 on aggregate.

18 May 2016

Atletico Nacional	0-3	Chorrillo
None		Josue Flores 93'; Rodolfo Ford 105'; Luis Jaramillo 111'

Nuevo Estadio Maracaná de Panamá, Panama City
Referee: Jafeth Perea

Chorrillio won 3-0 on aggregate.

==== Finals ====
Grand Final

23 May 2016

Plaza Amador	1-0	Chorrillo
Ernesto Sinclair 23'		None

Estadio Rommel Fernandez, Panama City
Referee: Jose kelly's

Clausura 2016 champions

6th title

== List of foreign players in the league ==
This is a list of foreign players in Clausura 2016. The following players:

1. have played at least one apertura game for the respective club.
2. have not been capped for the Panama national football team on any level, independently from the birthplace

Alianza

- (Argentina) Facundo Kroeck
- (Colombia) Robyn Pertuz
- (Colombia) Gerardo Negrete
- (Colombia) Mauricio Castaño

Arabe Unido

- (Dominican Republic) Miguel Lloyd

Chepo

- (Colombia) Miguel Duque

Chorillo

- (Brazil) Caio Milan
- (Brazil) Fabio da Silva
- (Colombia) Jorge Henriquez
- (Colombia) Yustin Arboleda

Plaza Amador

- (Spain) Ismael Remacha
- (Colombia) Ezequiel Palomeque
- (Colombia) Ariel Bonilla
- (Paraguay) Julio César Castillo

(player released mid season)

Atlético Chiriquí

- (Costa Rica) Erick Araya Godines
- (Colombia) Pablo César Murillo
- (Colombia) Ánderson Diaz

Atletico Nacional

- (Colombia) Manuel Murillo
- (Colombia) Andrés Santamaría

San Francisco FC

- (Colombia) Wanegre Delgado de Armas

Sporting San Miguelito

- None

Tauro FC

- (Colombia) Varcan Sterling
- (Colombia) Carlos Sierra
- (Colombia) Richard Ibargüen
- (Colombia) Carlos Mosquera
- (Colombia) Ariel Bonilla
