= Liga LPF =

Panamanian association football league

Liga LPF Tigo
- Founded: 1988; 38 years ago
- Country: Panama
- Confederation: CONCACAF
- Number of clubs: 12
- Level on pyramid: 1
- Relegation to: Liga PROM
- International cup(s): Regional; CONCACAF Central American Cup; Continental; CONCACAF Champions Cup
- Current champions: Plaza Amador (10th title) (Clausura 2026)
- Most championships: Tauro (17 titles)
- Top scorer: José Ardines (197 goals)
- Broadcaster(s): RPC TV, TV-Max
- Website: lpf.com.pa
- Current: 2026 Liga Panameña de Fútbol

The Liga Panameña de Fútbol (LPF; English: Panamanian Football League) is the top division football league in Panama. Until 2009, the league was named Asociación Nacional Pro Fútbol (ANAPROF).

== Competition format ==
The league's season is divided into two tournaments called the Apertura and Clausura. Teams are divided into two Conferences (Eastern and Western). The Eastern Conference is composed by: Tauro, Plaza Amador, Alianza, Club Deportivo del Este, Arabe Unido, and Sporting San Miguelito, while the Western Conference is composed by: Herrera FC, Club Atletico Independiente, Veraguas, Club Universitario, Chiriqui, and San Francisco. Both tournaments have an identical format. Each tournament has two stages: the first stage is a one and a half round-robin round where each team plays every other team twice in the same conference, once at home and once away, and one time against each team from the other conference. The top three teams advance to a final stage, a single-elimination culminating with a final match. Final Stage is composed by 3 rounds. First Round teams placed at 2nd will play teams placed at 3rd (2nd placed Eastern Conference vs 3rd place Western Conference and 2nd place Western Conference vs 3rd Place Eastern Conference) . The winners will go through to semifinals where they meet the 1st teams ranked on each conference (1st in Western Conference vs Winner of 2ECvs3WC and 1st in Eastern Conference vs 2WCvs3EC). Semifinals are two legged matches. Then, the championship final is a one-off match in a neutral venue (similar to American football's Super Bowl championship matches).

Each Apertura & Clausura tournament has 16 matches of regular season (twice (2) against each team (5) of same conference + once (1) against each team (6) in the opposite conference). Final stage has a total of: 2 matches in First Round Playoffs + 4 matches in Semifinals + 1 match in Final. First Round of Playoff are 1 leg matches (2nd place team in each conference plays at Home). Semifinals are 2 leg matches (home & away). Finals are 1 leg match in a neutral venue.

Regarding schedule in regular season: The schedule for each tournament (Apertura & Clausura) is set up into 16 match days. 10 matches against teams within same conference and 6 matches against opposing conference. In the Apertura, teams of the Eastern Conference will face only one time teams of the Western Conference. The team that plays home at the Apertura will have to play away when facing same team at the Clausura. This way the League can assure that Eastern Conference and Western Conference will face each other at Home & Away at the end of both tournaments. When playing against teams within the same conference, each team will face home & away matches in both Apertura and Clausura.

The first stage of both tournaments is combined into an aggregate table to determine relegation. The team with the fewest points is relegated to the Primera A for the following season.

The champions of both tournaments + the next best ranked team qualify to the CONCACAF Central American Cup. Beforehand, via the CONCACAF League, 3 teams used to qualify as well. As well, starting from 2023, the winners of both the Apertura & Clausura tournaments will qualify for Copa Libertadores, while the runners-up qualify for Copa Sudamericana.

== History ==
ANAPROF logo

Former logo used by Liga Panameña de Fútbol

In 1987, a group of men, composed of Giancarlo Gronchi, Jan Domburg, Edgar Plazas, Jorge Zelasny, Ángel Valero and Juan Carlos Delgado, met and founded the Asociación Nacional Pro-Fútbol (ANAPROF for short), which was inaugurated on February 26, 1988.

Their objective was to organize professional football in Panama, in order to help the Panama national team in the long term.

=== Founding teams ===
- Chirilanco (Bocas del Toro)
- Deportivo la Previsora (La Chorrera)
- Deportivo Perú (Panama City)
- Euro Kickers (Panama City)
- Plaza Amador (Panama City)
- Tauro (Panama City)

=== Timeline ===
- The league was founded as ANAPROF in 1988 after years of turmoil in Panamanian football. The first season, which featured six teams, began on February 26, 1988. Six teams participated. From that year until 2001, the league used a "long tournament" format in which every team played every other team in a home and away set. Since 2001, the league has used the Apertura/Clausura split season that is common to Latin America.
- From 1994 to 1996, Panamanian football was rent by a schism between ANAPROF and a rival league, LINFUNA. The split was resolved in 1996–97 when the leagues merged into a single twelve-team tournament.
- The next few seasons of league football were a bit confusing as the governing body tried to sort out its formats. In 1997–98, the league was split into two groups for the regular season, followed by an eight-team playoff. In 1998–99, the league shrunk to ten teams, with six of them advancing to a post-season tournament. The top four advanced further to a playoff to determine the champion. A similar format was used in 1999-2000 and 2000–2001.
- In 2001, the Apertura/Clausura format was adopted, and with modifications has been used ever since. The most significant involved the idea of the Grand Championship playoff. From 2001 to 2007, the winner of the Apertura faced the winner of the Clausura to determine a season champion. After 2007, this idea was abandoned.
- In 2009 ANAPROF changes its name to Liga Panameña de Fútbol.
- In 2021, LPF made changes to the Panamanian football structure, top-tier teams now will be considered as franchises and expanded the league from 10 to 12 teams with no relegation. The second-tier league will increase from 8 to 24 teams by combining top-tier teams U-20 teams, second-tier teams, and invitational teams.

=== LINFUNA Era ===
In 1994 Panamanian soccer suffered a great division, when the LINFUNA league was created, the league had Panamanian Football Federation approval and FIFA recognition. It was presided by Rolando Marco Hermoso, then succeeded by Ariel Alvarado.
ANAPROF teams Projusa FC and Alianza FC, were brought into the organization.
The league organized two championships (1994 and 1995), both won by C.D. Árabe Unido from Colón.
Following mediation by CONCACAF, on January 6, 1996, the leagues were unified under the ANAPROF name.

==== 1994 Participating teams ====
Árabe Unido, Projusa (Veraguas), Chorrillo, Alianza FC, Internacional Puerto Armuelles, Tulihueca de La Chorrera, Corporación Deportiva Independiente Municipal Panamá (DIM), Vista Alegre, Cruz Azul (David, Chiriquí) y el Altamira - Cosmos,

==== 1995 Participating teams ====
Árabe Unido, Projusa, Internacional Puerto Armuelles, Tulihueca de La Chorrera, Cosmos, Chorrillo, Alianza, Corporación Deportiva Independiente Municipal Panamá (DIM), Tigres de Vista Alegre y Cruz Azul.

== 2023 teams ==
Location of LPF teams

Club	City	Stadium	Capacity
Alianza	Panama City	Estadio Rommel Fernandez	32,000
Veraguas United F.C.	Atalaya, Veraguas	Estadio Rafael Rodriguez	350
Árabe Unido	Colón	Estadio Armando Dely Valdés	4,000
Universitario Cocle	Penonomé, Coclé	Estadio Universidad Latina Penonomé	3,500
Club Atlético Independiente	La Chorrera	Estadio Agustín Sánchez	3,000
Plaza Amador	Panama City	Estadio Javier Cruz	1,450
San Francisco	La Chorrera	Estadio Agustín Sánchez	3,000
Club Deportivo del Este	Panama City	Estadio Javier Cruz	700
Sporting San Miguelito	San Miguelito	Estadio de Los Andes	1,450
Tauro	Panama City	Estadio Rommel Fernández	32,000
Herrera F.C.	Chitré	Estadio Los Milagros de Chitré	1,000
Umecit F.C.	Atalaya, Veraguas	Estadio Rafael Rodriguez	350

== Results by year ==
The following table shows past results for ANAPROF (1988-09) and the Liga Panameña de Fútbol (2009–present)

Seasons	Champions	Manager	Runners-up
1988	Plaza Amador	(Colombia) Carlos Collazos	Deportivo La Previsora
1989	Tauro	(Uruguay) Miguel Mansilla	Deportivo La Previsora
1990	Plaza Amador	(El Salvador) Milton Palacios	Tauro
1991	Tauro	(Uruguay) Miguel Mansilla	Euro Kickers
1992	Plaza Amador	(Colombia) Carlos Collazos	Sporting Colón
1993	Euro Kickers	(Panama) Orlando Muñoz	Projusa
1994 LINFUNA	Árabe Unido	(Panama) Luis Hurtado	Cosmos
1994–95	San Francisco	(Panama) Leopoldo Lee	Tauro
1995 LINFUNA	Árabe Unido	(Panama) José Bezerra	Projusa
1995–96	San Francisco	(Panama) Leopoldo Lee	Plaza Amador
1996–97	Tauro	(Uruguay) Miguel Mansilla	Euro Kickers
1997–98	Tauro	(Uruguay) Miguel Mansilla	Árabe Unido
1998–99	Árabe Unido	(Peru) Eliazar Herrera	Tauro
1999–00	Tauro	(Panama) Alfredo Poyatos	Plaza Amador
2000–01	Panamá Viejo	(Panama) Gary Stempel	Tauro
2001 (Apertura)	Árabe Unido	(Colombia) Richard Parra	San Francisco
2001 (Clausura)	Árabe Unido	(Colombia) Richard Parra	Plaza Amador
2002 (Apertura)	Árabe Unido	(Colombia) Richard Parra	San Francisco
2002 (Clausura)	Plaza Amador	(Argentina) Sergio Giovagnoli	Tauro
2003 (Apertura)	Tauro	(Colombia) Gonzalo Soto	Árabe Unido
2003 (Clausura)	Tauro	(Colombia) Gonzalo Soto	Alianza
2004 (Apertura)	Árabe Unido	(Paraguay) Julio César Núñez	Plaza Amador
2004 (Clausura)	Árabe Unido	(Paraguay) Julio César Núñez	San Francisco
2005 (Apertura)	Plaza Amador	(Panama) Fernando Arnulfo Bolívar	Árabe Unido
2005 (Clausura)	San Francisco	(Panama) Gary Stempel	Atlético Veragüense
2006 (Apertura)	San Francisco	(Panama) Gary Stempel	Plaza Amador
2006 (Clausura)	Tauro	(Panama) Rubén Guevara	Árabe Unido
2007 (Apertura)	Tauro	(Uruguay) Miguel Mansilla	San Francisco
2007 (Clausura)	San Francisco	(Panama) Gary Stempel	Árabe Unido
2008 (Apertura)	San Francisco	(Panama) Gary Stempel	Tauro
2008 (Clausura)	Árabe Unido	(Colombia) Richard Parra	Tauro
2009 (Apertura) I	San Francisco	(Panama) Rubén Guevara	Chorrillo
2009 (Apertura) II	Árabe Unido	(Colombia) Richard Parra	Tauro
2010 (Clausura)	Árabe Unido	(Colombia) Richard Parra	San Francisco
2010 (Apertura)	Tauro	(Panama) Juan Carlos Cubilla	San Francisco
2011 (Clausura)	San Francisco	(Panama) Gary Stempel	Chorrillo
2011 (Apertura)	Chorrillo	(Uruguay) Miguel Angel Mansilla	Plaza Amador
2012 (Clausura)	Tauro	(Colombia) Sergio Angulo	Chepo
2012 (Apertura)	Árabe Unido	(Colombia) Jair Palacios	Chepo
2013 (Clausura)	Sporting San Miguelito	(Panama) Mario Anthony Torres	San Francisco
2013 (Apertura)	Tauro	(Panama) Rolando Palma	San Francisco
2014 (Clausura)	Chorrillo	(Panama) Julio Medina III	Río Abajo
2014 (Apertura)	San Francisco	(Panama) Gary Stempel	Sporting San Miguelito
2015 (Clausura)	Árabe Unido	(Colombia) Sergio Guzman	Independiente
2015 (Apertura)	Árabe Unido	(Colombia) Sergio Guzman	Chorrillo
2016 (Clausura)	Plaza Amador	(Colombia) Jair Palacios	Chorrillo
2016 (Apertura)	Árabe Unido	(Colombia) Sergio Guzman	Plaza Amador
2017 (Clausura)	Tauro	(Panama) Rolando Palma	Árabe Unido
2017 (Apertura)	Chorrillo	(Colombia) Oscar Upegui	Árabe Unido
2018 (Clausura)	Independiente	(Panama) Donaldo Gonzalez	Tauro
2018 (Apertura)	Tauro	(Uruguay) Saul Maldonado	Costa del Este
2019 (Clausura)	Independiente	(Venezuela) Francisco Perlo	San Francisco
2019 (Apertura)	Tauro	(Uruguay) Saul Maldonado	Costa del Este
2020 (Apertura)	Championship canceled due to COVID-19 pandemic.		
2020 (Clausura)	Independiente	(Venezuela) Francisco Perlo	San Francisco
2021 (Apertura)	Plaza Amador	(Panama) Jorge Dely Valdes	Universitario
2021 (Clausura)	Tauro	(Uruguay) Saul Maldonado	Herrera
2022 (Apertura)	Alianza	(Colombia) Jair Palacios	Sporting San Miguelito
2022 (Clausura)	Independiente	(Panama) Franklin Narváez	Universitario
2023 (Apertura)	Independiente	(Panama) Franklin Narváez	Tauro
2023 (Clausura)	Independiente	(Panama) Franklin Narváez	Tauro
2024 (Apertura)	Tauro	(Panama) Felipe Baloy	Plaza Amador
2024 (Clausura)	Independiente	(Panama) Franklin Narváez	Plaza Amador
2025 (Clausura)	Plaza Amador	(Panama) Mario Mendez	Alianza
2025 (Apertura)	Plaza Amador	(Panama) Mario Mendez	Alianza
2026 (Apertura)	Plaza Amador	(Panama) Mario Mendez	Alianza

== Championships by team ==
Club	Titles	Runners-up	Seasons won	Seasons runner-up
Tauro	17	9	1989, 1991, 1996–97, 1997–98, 1999–00, 2003 Apertura, 2003 Clausura, 2006 Clausura, 2007 Apertura, 2010 Apertura, 2012 Clausura, 2013 Apertura, 2017 Clausura, 2018 Apertura, 2019 Apertura, 2021 Clausura, 2024 Apertura	1990, 1994–95, 1998–99, 2000–01, 2002 Clausura, 2008 Apertura, 2008 Clausura, 2009 Apertura, 2018 Clausura, 2023 Apertura, 2023 Clausura
Árabe Unido	15^{1}	7	1994 LINFUNA, 1995 LINFUNA, 1998–99, 2001 Apertura, 2001 Clausura, 2002 Apertura, 2004 Apertura, 2004 Clausura, 2008 Clausura, 2009 Apertura, 2010 Clausura, 2012 Apertura, 2015 Clausura, 2015 Apertura, 2016 Apertura	1997–98, 2003 Apertura, 2005 Apertura, 2006 Clausura, 2007 Clausura, 2017 Clausura, 2017 Apertura
Plaza Amador	10	9	1988, 1990, 1992, 2002 Clausura, 2005 Apertura, 2016 Clausura, 2021 Apertura, 2025 Clausura, 2025 Apertura, 2026 Clausura	1995–96, 1999–00, 2001 Clausura, 2004 Apertura, 2006 Apertura, 2011 Apertura, 2016 Apertura, 2024 Apertura, 2024 Clausura
San Francisco	9	11^{2}	1994–95, 1995–96, 2005 Clausura, 2006 Apertura, 2007 Clausura, 2008 Apertura, 2009 Apertura, 2011 Clausura, 2014 Apertura	2001 Apertura, 2002 Apertura, 2004 Clausura, 2007 Apertura, 2010 Clausura, 2010 Apertura, 2013 Clausura, 2013 Apertura, 2019 Clausura, 2020 Clausura, 2025 Clausura
Independiente	7	1	2018 Clausura, 2019 Clausura, 2020 Clausura, 2022 Clausura, 2023 Apertura, 2023 Clausura, 2024 Clausura	2015 Clausura
Chorrillo†	3	4	2011 Apertura, 2014 Clausura, 2017 Apertura	2009 Apertura, 2011 Clausura, 2015 Apertura, 2016 Clausura
Alianza	1	3	2022 Apertura	2003 Clausura, 2025 Apertura, 2026 Clausura
Euro Kickers†	1	2	1993	1991, 1996–97
Sporting San Miguelito	1	2	2013 Clausura	2014 Apertura, 2022 Apertura
Panamá Viejo	1	—	2000–01	—

^{1} Including 2 Winners in LINFUNA.
^{2} Including 2 Runners-up under the name Deportivo La Previsora.
† Teams dissolved.

== Top-scorers by season ==
Season	Player	Team	Total
1988	(Panama) Miguel Tello	Plaza Amador	13
1989	(Colombia) Alonso Pacheco	Deportivo la Previsora	18
1990	(Panama) José Ardines	Euro Kickers	26
1991	(Panama) José Ardines	Euro Kickers	13
1992	(Panama) José Ardines	Euro Kickers	20
1993	(Panama) José Ardines	Euro Kickers	12
1994–95	(Panama) José Ardines	Euro Kickers	20
1995–96	(Panama) José Ardines	Euro Kickers	25
1996–97	(Panama) Patricio Guevara	Tauro	22
1997–98	(Panama) Luis Calamaris	San Francisco	21
1998–99	(Panama) Luis Calamaris	San Francisco	18
1999–00	(Panama) René Mendieta	Tauro	15
2000–01	(Panama) Luis Parra	Tauro	17
2001 (A)	(Panama) Ricardo Phillips	Panamá Viejo	13
2001 (C)	(Panama) Roberto Brown	San Francisco	13
2002 (A)	(Panama) Gabriel de los Rios	Alianza	7
2002 (C)	(Panama) Anel Canales	Tauro	10
2003 (A)	(Panama) Anel Canales	Chorrillo	11
2003 (C)	(Colombia) Hector Nazarith (Colombia) Wilson Zuñiga	Tauro; Alianza	9
2004 (A)	(Panama) Jorge Dely Valdés	Árabe Unido	12
2005 (A)	(Panama) José Luis Garcés	San Francisco	11
2005 (C)	(Panama) José Luis Garcés	San Francisco	13
2006 (A)	(Panama) Luis Tejada	Plaza Amador	11
2006 (C)	(Panama) César Medina	Alianza	12
2007 (A)	(Panama) Edwin Aguilar	Tauro	14
2007 (C)	(Panama) Gabriel Torres (Panama) Orlando Rodríguez	Chepo; Árabe Unido	9
2008 (A)	(Panama) César Medina	Alianza	12
2008 (C)	(Panama) Orlando Rodríguez	Árabe Unido	18
2009 (A)	(Panama) Edwin Aguilar	Tauro	18
2009 (A)	(Panama) Armando Polo	Sporting San Miguelito	12
2010 (C)	(Colombia) Johan de Ávila	San Francisco	10
2010 (A)	(Panama) Gabriel Ríos	Atlético Chiriquí	8
2011 (C)	(Panama) Boris Alfaro (Panama) Brunette Hay	San Francisco; Sporting San Miguelito	9
2011 (A)	(Panama) César Medina (Panama) Delano Welch	Alianza; Chepo	8

Season	Player	Team	Total
2012 (C)	(Panama) Luis Rentería	Tauro	11
2012 (A)	(Panama) Jorman Aguilar	Río Abajo	10
2013 (C)	(Panama) Ricardo Clarke	Sporting San Miguelito	10
2013 (A)	(Panama) Ernesto Sinclair	Independiente	8
2014 (C)	(Panama) Carlos Small	Sporting San Miguelito	10
2014 (A)	(Panama) José González (Panama) Yairo Yau	Árabe Unido; Sporting San Miguelito	8
2015 (C)	(Panama) Johnny Ruiz	San Francisco	10
2015 (A)	(Panama) Armando Polo	Árabe Unido	8
2016 (C)	(Colombia) Manuel Murrillo	Atletico Nacional	10
2016 (A)	(Panama) Edwin Aguilar	Tauro	13
2017 (C)	(Panama) Jorlian Sanchez	Sporting San Miguelito	9
2017 (A)	(Panama) Ronald Dinolis	Sporting San Miguelito	10
2018 (C)	(Panama) José Fajardo	CA Independiente	13
2018 (A)	(Panama) Edwin Aguilar	Tauro F.C.	10
2018 (C)	(Panama) José Fajardo	CA Independiente	15
2018 (A)	(Panama) Edwin Aguilar	Tauro FC	10
2019 (C)	(Colombia) Cristian Zúñiga (Panama) Enrico Small	San Francisco FC; Tauro FC	10
2019 (A)	(Colombia) Cristian Zúñiga (Panama) Valentín Pimentel	San Francisco FC; Costa del Este FC	7
2020 (A)	Championship canceled due to COVID-19 pandemic.		
2020 (C)	(Panama) Alfredo Stephens	CA Independiente	8
2021 (A)	(Panama) Jair Catuy	Universitario	11
2021 (C)	(Panama) Ismael Díaz	Tauro FC	10
2022 (A)	(Panama) Ricardo Buitrago	Plaza Amador	7
2022 (C)	(Panama) Joseph Cox	Universitario	13
2023 (A)	(Panama) Ronaldo Córdoba	Herrera	16
2023 (C)	(Panama) Víctor Ávila	CA Independiente	12

== See also ==
- Panamanian football clubs in CONCACAF competitions
