= Estadio Javier Cruz =

Stadium in Panama City

Coordinates: 8°59′16″N 79°32′03″W

Estadio Javier Cruz 'Artes y Oficios' is a multi-purpose stadium. It located at the corner of Ricardo J. Alfaro Avenue and Vía Simón Bolivar in Panama City, Republic of Panama; close to Colegio de Artes Y Oficios Melchor Lasso de La Vega, from which it has received part of his name. It is currently used mostly for football matches and is the home stadium of Tierra Firme F.C. from the Liga Nacional de Ascenso. The stadium holds 2,500 spectators.
