= 2007 UNCAF Nations Cup squads =

Rosters for the UNCAF Nations Cup 2007 tournament

Below are the rosters for the UNCAF Nations Cup 2007 tournament in El Salvador, from February 8 to 18, 2007.

== Group A ==
=== El Salvador ===
Head coach: (Mexico) Carlos de los Cobos

No.	Pos.	Player	Date of birth (age)	Caps	Goals	Club
1	GK	Juan José Gómez	11 August 1980 (aged 26)	38	0	(Salvadoran Football Federation) Luis Ángel Firpo
2	DF	Manuel Salazar	23 January 1986 (aged 21)	0	0	(Salvadoran Football Federation) Luis Ángel Firpo
4	DF	Luis Anaya	19 May 1981 (aged 25)	4	0	(Salvadoran Football Federation) Águila
5	DF	Víctor Velásquez	12 April 1976 (aged 30)	48	4	(Salvadoran Football Federation) Alianza
6	DF	Rolando Torres	21 December 1982 (aged 24)	4	0	(Salvadoran Football Federation) Águila
7	MF	Víctor Merino	19 August 1979 (aged 27)	10	0	(Salvadoran Football Federation) Luis Ángel Firpo
8	MF	Héctor Ávalos	9 April 1978 (aged 28)	1	0	(Salvadoran Football Federation) Once Municipal
9	FW	Álex Erazo	28 July 1980 (aged 26)	6	1	(Salvadoran Football Federation) Águila
10	FW	Josué Galdámez	18 December 1982 (aged 24)	23	2	(Salvadoran Football Federation) Chalatenago
14	FW	Juan Díaz Rodríguez	8 November 1985 (aged 21)	3	0	(Salvadoran Football Federation) FAS
15	DF	Leonel Guevara	7 October 1983 (aged 23)	1	0	(Salvadoran Football Federation) Vista Hermosa
16	MF	José Salamanca	24 October 1979 (aged 27)	2	0	(Salvadoran Football Federation) Chalatenago
18	MF	Gilberto Murgas	22 January 1981 (aged 26)	36	4	(Salvadoran Football Federation) FAS
19	DF	Alfredo Pacheco	1 December 1982 (aged 24)	30	3	(Salvadoran Football Federation) FAS
20	DF	William Antonio Torres	30 May 1981 (aged 25)	24	0	(Salvadoran Football Federation) San Salvador
21	MF	Eliseo Quintanilla	5 February 1983 (aged 24)	6	1	(Salvadoran Football Federation) San Salvador
22	GK	Dagoberto Portillo	16 November 1979 (aged 27)	0	0	(Salvadoran Football Federation) Alianza
23	FW	José Martínez	30 September 1979 (aged 27)	24	2	(Salvadoran Football Federation) Luis Ángel Firpo
25	GK	José Manuel González	6 October 1981 (aged 25)	1	0	(Salvadoran Football Federation) Vista Hermosa

=== Guatemala ===
Head coach: (Colombia) Hernán Darío Gómez

No.	Pos.	Player	Date of birth (age)	Caps	Goals	Club
1	GK	Ricardo Trigueño	17 April 1980 (aged 26)	27	0	(National Football Federation of Guatemala) Marquense
2	DF	Leonel Noriega	10 May 1975 (aged 31)	1	0	(National Football Federation of Guatemala) Marquense
4	DF	Yony Flores	16 February 1983 (aged 23)	0	0	(National Football Federation of Guatemala) Marquense
5	DF	Henry Medina	16 March 1981 (aged 25)	7	1	(National Football Federation of Guatemala) Municipal
6	DF	Gustavo Cabrera	13 December 1979 (aged 27)	56	0	(National Football Federation of Guatemala) Comunicaciones
7	MF	Claudio Albizuris	1 July 1981 (aged 25)	15	0	(National Football Federation of Guatemala) Municipal
8	MF	José Manuel Contreras	19 January 1986 (aged 21)	3	0	(National Football Federation of Guatemala) Comunicaciones
9	FW	Edwin Villatoro	18 February 1980 (aged 26)	19	5	(National Football Federation of Guatemala) Municipal
10	MF	Freddy García	12 January 1977 (aged 30)	60	20	(National Football Federation of Guatemala) Municipal
11	FW	Gregory Lester Ruiz	8 March 1981 (aged 25)	0	0	(National Football Federation of Guatemala) Marquense
12	MF	Marvin Ávila	6 December 1985 (aged 21)	5	1	(National Football Federation of Guatemala) Suchitepéquez
13	DF	Néstor Martínez	13 March 1981 (aged 25)	42	0	(National Football Federation of Guatemala) Marquense
14	DF	Élmer Ponciano	28 June 1978 (aged 28)	15	1	(National Football Federation of Guatemala) Comunicaciones
15	MF	Fredy Thompson	2 June 1982 (aged 24)	58	0	(National Football Federation of Guatemala) Comunicaciones
16	MF	Saúl de Matta	17 April 1980 (aged 26)	5	0	(National Football Federation of Guatemala) Comunicaciones
17	MF	Carlos Quiñónez	20 July 1977 (aged 29)	15	0	(National Football Federation of Guatemala) Marquense
18	FW	César Alegría	29 October 1977 (aged 29)	11	2	(National Football Federation of Guatemala) Marquense
19	FW	Florencio Martínez	3 October 1986 (aged 20)	1	1	(National Football Federation of Guatemala) Suchitepéquez
22	GK	Luis Pedro Molina	4 June 1977 (aged 29)	6	0	(National Football Federation of Guatemala) Jalapa
25	GK	Paulo César Motta	29 March 1982 (aged 24)	10	0	(National Football Federation of Guatemala) Municipal

=== Belize ===
Head coach: (Brazil) Antonio Carlos Vieira

No.	Pos.	Player	Date of birth (age)	Caps	Goals	Club
1	GK	Shane Orio	7 August 1980 (aged 26)	8	0	(Costa Rican Football Federation) Puntarenas
2	FW	Lennox Castillo	19 November 1985 (aged 21)	0	0	(Football Federation of Belize) Revolutionary Conquerors
3	MF	Ryan Simpson	9 July 1985 (aged 21)	0	0	(Panamanian Football Federation) Atlético Chiriquí
5	DF	Christobal Gilharry	2 September 1980 (aged 26)	0	0	(Football Federation of Belize)
7	MF	Mark Leslie	20 August 1978 (aged 28)	8	1	(Football Federation of Belize) FC Belize
8	DF	Kareem Haylock	21 May 1984 (aged 22)	0	0	(Football Federation of Belize) Revolutionary Conquerors
9	FW	Deon McCaulay	20 September 1987 (aged 19)	0	0	(Football Federation of Belize) FC Belize
10	MF	Harrison Róchez	29 November 1983 (aged 23)	4	0	(Football Federation of Belize) Valley Pride Freedom Fighters
11	MF	David Trapp	5 August 1981 (aged 25)	0	0	(Football Federation of Belize) Santel's
15	MF	Víctor Morales	11 July 1982 (aged 24)	5	0	(Football Federation of Belize) Costa Del Sol
16	MF	Deris Benavides	1 May 1976 (aged 30)	0	0	(Football Federation of Belize) Hankook Verdes
18	DF	Orlando Lyons	25 September 1983 (aged 23)	7	0	(Football Federation of Belize) Costa Del Sol
19	MF	Trevor Lennan	5 June 1983 (aged 23)	3	0	(Football Federation of Belize) Hankook Verdes
20	DF	Elroy Smith	30 November 1981 (aged 25)	5	0	(Football Federation of Belize) Wagiya
21	DF	Andrew Allen	2 September 1984 (aged 22)	0	0	(Football Federation of Belize) Alpha Glitters
22	DF	Ian Gaynair	26 February 1986 (aged 20)	0	0	(Football Federation of Belize) FC Belize
23	DF	Dalton Eiley	10 December 1983 (aged 23)	3	0	(Football Federation of Belize) Texmar Boys
25	GK	Charlie Slusher	28 November 1971 (aged 35)	10	0	(Football Federation of Belize) Belmopan Bandits
27	GK	Woodrow West	19 September 1985 (aged 21)	0	0	(Football Federation of Belize)

=== Nicaragua ===
Head coach: (Argentina) Carlos Alberto de Toro

No.	Pos.	Player	Date of birth (age)	Caps	Goals	Club
1	GK	Denis Espinoza	25 August 1983 (aged 23)	4	0	(Nicaraguan Football Federation) Diriangén
2	DF	Róger Mejía	30 April 1984 (aged 22)	0	0	(Nicaraguan Football Federation) América Managua
3	DF	Silvio Avilés	11 August 1980 (aged 26)	9	0	(Nicaraguan Football Federation) Diriangén
4	DF	Hoogly Corrales	30 October 1978 (aged 28)	0	0	(Nicaraguan Football Federation) Diriangén
5	MF	Eustace Martín	21 December 1983 (aged 23)	1	0	(Nicaraguan Football Federation) Diriangén
6	DF	Carlos Alonso	25 August 1979 (aged 27)	23	0	(Nicaraguan Football Federation) Scorpión
7	MF	Miguel Ángel Masís	11 September 1983 (aged 23)	0	0	(Nicaraguan Football Federation)
8	MF	Franklin López	16 August 1982 (aged 24)	7	1	(Nicaraguan Football Federation) Diriangén
9	FW	David Martínez	10 August 1983 (aged 23)	2	0	(Nicaraguan Football Federation) Real Estelí
10	FW	Samuel Wilson	4 April 1983 (aged 23)	2	0	(Nicaraguan Football Federation) Real Estelí
11	MF	Remy Vanegas	14 October 1986 (aged 20)	0	0	(Nicaraguan Football Federation) Diriangén
12	GK	Marcos Antonio Landero		0	0	(Nicaraguan Football Federation)
13	DF	Jaime Ruiz	24 August 1981 (aged 25)	11	0	(Nicaraguan Football Federation) Real Estelí
14	DF	David Solórzano	5 November 1980 (aged 26)	21	1	(Nicaraguan Football Federation) Deportivo Masatepe
15	DF	Hevel Quintanilla	14 November 1977 (aged 29)	14	0	(Nicaraguan Football Federation) Diriangén
16	MF	Armando Reyes	29 July 1981 (aged 25)	6	0	(Nicaraguan Football Federation) Diriangén
17	DF	Milton Busto	19 April 1982 (aged 24)	4	1	(Nicaraguan Football Federation) Diriangén
18	MF	Hamilton West	16 October 1977 (aged 29)	18	0	(Nicaraguan Football Federation) Deportivo Masatepe
19	FW	Wilber Sánchez	20 October 1979 (aged 27)	4	0	(Nicaraguan Football Federation) Real Estelí
20	FW	Emilio Palacios	8 October 1982 (aged 24)	17	8	(Nicaraguan Football Federation) Diriangén

== Group B ==
=== Costa Rica ===
Head coach: (Costa Rica) Hernán Medford

No.	Pos.	Player	Date of birth (age)	Caps	Goals	Club
1	GK	Wardy Alfaro	31 December 1977 (aged 29)	3	0	(Costa Rican Football Federation) Alajuelense
2	DF	Jervis Drummond	8 September 1976 (aged 30)	58	1	(Costa Rican Football Federation) Saprissa
3	DF	Víctor Cordero	9 November 1973 (aged 33)	31	0	(Costa Rican Football Federation) Saprissa
4	DF	Michael Umaña	16 July 1982 (aged 24)	23	0	(Costa Rican Football Federation) Herediano
5	DF	Freddy Fernández	5 February 1974 (aged 33)	0	0	(Costa Rican Football Federation) Municipal Pérez Zeledón
6	MF	Michael Barrantes	4 October 1983 (aged 23)	1	0	(Costa Rican Football Federation) Puntarenas
7	FW	Rolando Fonseca	6 June 1974 (aged 32)	95	42	(Costa Rican Football Federation) Alajuelense
8	DF	Roberto Wong	17 August 1979 (aged 27)	0	0	(Costa Rican Football Federation) Puntarenas
9	FW	Alonso Solís	14 October 1978 (aged 28)	31	5	(Costa Rican Football Federation) Saprissa
10	MF	Walter Centeno	6 October 1974 (aged 32)	94	15	(Costa Rican Football Federation) Saprissa
11	FW	Andy Furtado	3 January 1980 (aged 27)	1	0	(Costa Rican Football Federation) San Carlos
12	DF	Leonardo González	21 November 1980 (aged 26)	42	0	(Costa Rican Football Federation) Herediano
14	MF	Rodolfo Rodríguez	27 February 1980 (aged 26)	1	0	(Costa Rican Football Federation) Brujas
15	DF	Harold Wallace	7 September 1975 (aged 31)	78	2	(Costa Rican Football Federation) Alajuelense
16	MF	Carlos Hernández	9 April 1982 (aged 24)	22	6	(Costa Rican Football Federation) Alajuelense
17	MF	Félix Montoya	28 March 1980 (aged 26)	1	0	(Costa Rican Football Federation) Herediano
18	GK	José Porras	8 November 1970 (aged 36)	20	0	(Costa Rican Football Federation) Saprissa
21	FW	Kurt Bernard	8 December 1977 (aged 29)	6	0	(Costa Rican Football Federation) Puntarenas
22	DF	Try Bennett	5 August 1975 (aged 31)	21	1	(Costa Rican Football Federation) Saprissa
23	GK	Dexter Lewis	2 February 1981 (aged 26)	0	0	(Costa Rican Football Federation) Municipal Pérez Zeledón

=== Honduras ===
Head coach: (Honduras) José de la Paz Herrera

No.	Pos.	Player	Date of birth (age)	Caps	Goals	Club
1	GK	Víctor Coello	29 July 1974 (aged 32)	31	0	(National Autonomous Federation of Football of Honduras) Marathón
3	DF	Maynor Figueroa	2 May 1983 (aged 23)	30	2	(National Autonomous Federation of Football of Honduras) Olimpia
4	DF	Júnior Izaguirre	12 August 1979 (aged 27)	26	2	(National Autonomous Federation of Football of Honduras) Marathón
5	FW	Érick Vallecillo	29 January 1980 (aged 27)	26	0	(National Autonomous Federation of Football of Honduras) Real España
6	DF	Sergio Mendoza	23 May 1981 (aged 25)	22	0	(National Autonomous Federation of Football of Honduras) Olimpia
7	MF	Emil Martínez	17 September 1982 (aged 24)	29	1	(National Autonomous Federation of Football of Honduras) Marathón
8	MF	Wilson Palacios	29 July 1984 (aged 22)	34	2	(National Autonomous Federation of Football of Honduras) Olimpia
9	FW	Jairo Martínez	14 May 1978 (aged 28)	27	9	(National Autonomous Federation of Football of Honduras) Motagua
10	FW	Wilmer Velásquez	28 April 1972 (aged 34)	44	29	(National Autonomous Federation of Football of Honduras) Olimpia
11	FW	Jorge Claros	8 January 1986 (aged 21)	5	0	(National Autonomous Federation of Football of Honduras) Motagua
13	MF	Dennis Ferrera	3 December 1980 (aged 26)	7	0	(National Autonomous Federation of Football of Honduras) Marathón
14	DF	Oscar Boniek García	4 September 1984 (aged 22)	12	0	(National Autonomous Federation of Football of Honduras) Marathón
15	DF	Yermi Hernandez	2 December 1980 (aged 26)	2	0	(National Autonomous Federation of Football of Honduras) Real España
16	MF	Mauricio Castro	11 August 1981 (aged 25)	1	0	(National Autonomous Federation of Football of Honduras) Hispano
17	DF	Emilio Izaguirre	5 October 1986 (aged 20)	1	0	(National Autonomous Federation of Football of Honduras) Motagua
18	FW	Saúl Martínez	29 January 1976 (aged 31)	29	12	(Chinese Football Association) Shanghai United
19	FW	Carlos Will Mejía	29 August 1983 (aged 23)	0	0	(National Autonomous Federation of Football of Honduras) Platense
20	DF	Mario Beata	17 October 1974 (aged 32)	14	0	(National Autonomous Federation of Football of Honduras) Marathón
21	GK	Donis Escober	3 February 1980 (aged 27)	3	0	(National Autonomous Federation of Football of Honduras) Olimpia
23	DF	Víctor Bernárdez	24 May 1982 (aged 24)	15	1	(National Autonomous Federation of Football of Honduras) Motagua

=== Panama ===
Head coach: (Costa Rica) Alexandre Guimarães

No.	Pos.	Player	Date of birth (age)	Caps	Goals	Club
1	GK	Jaime Penedo	26 September 1981 (aged 25)	24	0	(Royal Spanish Football Federation) Osasuna
2	DF	Carlos Rivera	30 May 1979 (aged 27)	33	0	(Panamanian Football Federation) San Francisco
4	DF	José Anthony Torres	27 August 1972 (aged 34)	59	0	(National Autonomous Federation of Football of Honduras) Victoria
5	DF	Román Torres	20 March 1986 (aged 20)	7	0	(Colombian Football Federation) Cortuluá
7	MF	Juan Pérez	1 January 1980 (aged 27)	1	0	(Panamanian Football Federation) Tauro
8	MF	Alberto Blanco	8 January 1978 (aged 29)	42	1	(Saudi Arabian Football Federation) Al-Nassr
9	FW	Gabriel Torres	31 October 1988 (aged 18)	6	1	(Panamanian Football Federation) San Francisco
10	MF	Rolando Escobar	24 October 1981 (aged 25)	2	0	(Panamanian Football Federation) Tauro
11	MF	Víctor Herrera	18 April 1980 (aged 26)	8	2	(Panamanian Football Federation) San Francisco
12	GK	Óscar McFarlane	29 November 1980 (aged 26)	15	0	(Panamanian Football Federation) Tauro
13	DF	Joel Solanilla	24 December 1983 (aged 23)	17	0	(Colombian Football Federation) Envigado
15	MF	Ricardo Phillips	31 January 1975 (aged 32)	58	9	(Panamanian Football Federation) San Francisco
16	DF	Ubaldo Guardia	8 June 1977 (aged 29)	40	0	(Panamanian Football Federation) Tauro
17	DF	Luis Henríquez	23 November 1981 (aged 25)	30	0	(Panamanian Football Federation) Tauro
18	FW	Luis Tejada	28 March 1982 (aged 24)	29	13	(Panamanian Football Federation) Plaza Amador
19	FW	Anel Canales	15 March 1978 (aged 28)	9	1	(Salvadoran Football Federation) Alianza
20	MF	Engie Mitre	16 October 1981 (aged 25)	29	0	(Panamanian Football Federation) Plaza Amador
21	DF	Amílcar Henríquez	2 August 1983 (aged 23)	14	0	(Costa Rican Football Federation) Santacruceña
23	DF	Felipe Baloy	24 February 1981 (aged 25)	25	1	(Mexican Football Federation) Monterrey
26	MF	Reggie Arosemena	10 September 1986 (aged 20)	7	0	(Panamanian Football Federation) Tauro
