= 2009 UNCAF Nations Cup squads =

Rosters for the UNCAF Nations Cup 2009 tournament

Below are the rosters for the UNCAF Nations Cup 2009 tournament in Honduras, from January 22 to February 1, 2009.

== Group A ==
=== El Salvador ===
Head coach: (Mexico) Carlos de los Cobos

No.	Pos.	Player	Date of birth (age)	Caps	Goals	Club
1	GK	Juan José Gomez	August 11, 1980 (aged 28)	59	0	(Salvadoran Football Federation) Luis Ángel Firpo
18	GK	Miguel Montes	February 12, 1980 (aged 28)	18	0	(Salvadoran Football Federation) Nejapa
2	DF	Alexander Escobar	April 4, 1984 (aged 24)	20	0	(Salvadoran Football Federation) Isidro Metapán
3	DF	Marvin González	April 17, 1982 (aged 26)	45	0	(Salvadoran Football Federation) FAS
5	DF	Luis Hernández	February 9, 1985 (aged 23)	11	0	(Salvadoran Football Federation) Atlético Balboa
13	DF	Deris Umanzor	January 7, 1980 (aged 29)	11	1	(Salvadoran Football Federation) Águila
15	DF	Alfredo Pacheco	December 1, 1982 (aged 26)	57	4	(Salvadoran Football Federation) FAS
19	DF	Ricardo Alvarado	May 23, 1980 (aged 28)	0	0	(Salvadoran Football Federation) Isidro Metapán
6	MF	Shawn Martin	February 15, 1987 (aged 21)	18	4	(Salvadoran Football Federation) Águila
7	MF	Ramón Sánchez	May 25, 1982 (aged 26)	31	1	(Salvadoran Football Federation) Alianza
8	MF	Osael Romero	April 18, 1986 (aged 22)	17	1	(Salvadoran Football Federation) Vista Hermosa
10	MF	Eliseo Quintanilla	February 5, 1982 (aged 26)	30	11	(Salvadoran Football Federation) Águila
16	MF	Edwin Miranda	January 28, 1981 (aged 27)	0	0	(Puerto Rican Football Federation) Puerto Rico Islanders
20	MF	Óscar Jiménez	April 18, 1979 (aged 29)	17	0	(Salvadoran Football Federation) Alianza
4	FW	César Larios	April 21, 1988 (aged 20)	6	1	(Salvadoran Football Federation) FAS
9	FW	Salvador Coreas	September 29, 1984 (aged 24)	19	0	(Salvadoran Football Federation) Vista Hermosa
11	FW	Carlos Ayala	December 23, 1982 (aged 26)	0	0	(Salvadoran Football Federation) Chalatenango
12	FW	Rodolfo Zelaya	July 3, 1988 (aged 20)	10	4	(Salvadoran Football Federation) Alianza
14	FW	Rudis Corrales	November 6, 1979 (aged 29)	41	13	(Salvadoran Football Federation) Águila
17	FW	Cristian Castillo	July 27, 1984 (aged 24)	14	1	(Salvadoran Football Federation) Alianza

=== Honduras ===
Head coach: (Colombia) Reynaldo Rueda

No.	Pos.	Player	Date of birth (age)	Caps	Goals	Club
1	GK	John Alston Bodden	October 30, 1981 (aged 27)	4	0	(National Autonomous Federation of Football of Honduras) Victoria
18	GK	Noel Valladares	May 3, 1977 (aged 31)	54	0	(National Autonomous Federation of Football of Honduras) Olimpia
22	GK	Víctor Coello	April 10, 1974 (aged 34)	30	0	(National Autonomous Federation of Football of Honduras) Marathón
5	DF	Erick Norales	November 2, 1985 (aged 23)	1	0	(National Autonomous Federation of Football of Honduras) Marathón
4	DF	Mario Beata	October 17, 1974 (aged 34)	12	0	(National Autonomous Federation of Football of Honduras) Marathón
2	DF	Osman Chávez	July 29, 1984 (aged 24)	8	0	(National Autonomous Federation of Football of Honduras) Platense
23	DF	Iván Guerrero	November 30, 1977 (aged 31)	75	4	(United States Soccer Federation) D.C. United
21	DF	Emilio Izaguirre	October 5, 1986 (aged 22)	21	1	(National Autonomous Federation of Football of Honduras) Motagua
14	DF	Oscar Bonieck García	September 4, 1984 (aged 24)	32	0	(National Autonomous Federation of Football of Honduras) Olimpia
17	MF	Mariano Acevedo	March 2, 1983 (aged 25)	1	0	(National Autonomous Federation of Football of Honduras) Marathón
20	MF	Amado Guevara (captain)	May 2, 1976 (aged 32)	119	28	(Canadian Soccer Association) Toronto FC
25	MF	Hendry Thomas	February 23, 1985 (aged 23)	21	2	(National Autonomous Federation of Football of Honduras) Olimpia
7	MF	Emil Martínez	September 9, 1982 (aged 26)	45	2	(Chinese Football Association) Shanghai Shenhua
16	MF	Mario Rodríguez	July 31, 1975 (aged 33)	20	0	(National Autonomous Federation of Football of Honduras) Real España
10	MF	Danilo Turcios	May 8, 1978 (aged 30)	71	7	(National Autonomous Federation of Football of Honduras) Olimpia
13	MF	Roger Espinoza	October 25, 1986 (aged 22)	1	0	(United States Soccer Federation) Kansas City Wizards
12	MF	Marvin Chávez	November 3, 1983 (aged 25)	5	0	(National Autonomous Federation of Football of Honduras) Marathón
15	FW	Walter Martínez	March 28, 1982 (aged 26)	16	6	(Chinese Football Association) Beijing Guoan
11	FW	Saul Martínez	January 29, 1976 (aged 32)	31	13	(National Autonomous Federation of Football of Honduras) Marathón
9	FW	Carlos Pavón	October 9, 1973 (aged 35)	84	49	(National Autonomous Federation of Football of Honduras) Real España
19	FW	Allan Lalín	January 5, 1981 (aged 28)	3	0	(National Autonomous Federation of Football of Honduras) Real España
8	FW	Carlos Will Mejía	September 29, 1983 (aged 25)	5	1	(National Autonomous Federation of Football of Honduras) Marathón

=== Belize ===
Head coach: (United States) Ian Mork

No.	Pos.	Player	Date of birth (age)	Caps	Goals	Club
1	GK	Woodrow West	September 19, 1985 (aged 23)	2	0	(Football Federation of Belize) Valley Renaissance
22	GK	Stephen López	September 24, 1980 (aged 28)	0	0	(Football Federation of Belize) Georgetown Ibayani
2	DF	Randy Cassanova	February 1, 1984 (aged 24)			(Football Federation of Belize) Nizhee Corozal
4	DF	Kent Gabourel	May 26, 1980 (aged 28)	0	0	(Football Federation of Belize) Hankook Verdes
5	DF	Shannon Flowers	July 24, 1985 (aged 23)	0	0	(Football Federation of Belize) FC Belize
7	DF	Ian Gaynair	February 26, 1986 (aged 22)	6	0	(Football Federation of Belize) FC Belize
16	DF	Christobal Gilharry	September 2, 1980 (aged 28)	3	0	(Football Federation of Belize) FC Belize
17	DF	Lester Serano	December 31, 1978 (aged 30)	3	0	(Football Federation of Belize) Belize Defence Force
18	DF	Elroy Smith	November 30, 1981 (aged 27)	12	1	(National Autonomous Federation of Football of Honduras) Deportes Savio
3	MF	Ryan Simpson	December 9, 1985 (aged 23)	9	0	(Football Federation of Belize) Ilagulei FC
6	MF	Lisbey Castillo	June 30, 1987 (aged 21)	0	0	(Football Federation of Belize) Ilagulei FC
8	MF	Kareem Haylock	May 21, 1984 (aged 24)	1	0	(Football Federation of Belize) Ilagulei FC
9	MF	Elroy Kuylen	June 6, 1983 (aged 25)	0	0	(Football Federation of Belize) Ilagulei FC
11	MF	Bernard Linarez	October 29, 1985 (aged 23)	6	0	(Football Federation of Belize) Georgetown Ibayani
15	MF	Víctor Morales	July 11, 1982 (aged 26)	8	0	(Football Federation of Belize) Nizhee Corozal
19	MF	Clifford Usher	August 11, 1971 (aged 37)	3	0	(Football Federation of Belize) Ilagulei FC
10	FW	Harrison Roches	November 29, 1983 (aged 25)	10	1	(National Autonomous Federation of Football of Honduras) Deportes Savio
12	FW	Jerome James	April 11, 1981 (aged 27)	6	0	(Football Federation of Belize) FC Belize
13	FW	Dennis Serrano	September 27, 1981 (aged 27)	6	0	(Football Federation of Belize) Belize Defence Force
14	FW	Byron Usher	December 3, 1989 (aged 19)	0	0	(Football Federation of Belize) FC Belize

=== Nicaragua ===
Head coach: (Nicaragua) Otoniel Olivas

No.	Pos.	Player	Date of birth (age)	Caps	Goals	Club
1	GK	Denis Espinoza	August 25, 1983 (aged 25)	9	0	(Nicaraguan Football Federation) Walter Ferretti
12	GK	Carlos Mendieta	November 3, 1979 (aged 29)	3	0	(Nicaraguan Football Federation) Real Estelí
2	DF	David Solórzano	November 8, 1980 (aged 28)	22	1	(Nicaraguan Football Federation) Diriangén
3	DF	Carlos Alonso	August 25, 1979 (aged 29)	27	0	(Nicaraguan Football Federation) VCP Chinandega
4	DF	Armando Collado	November 17, 1983 (aged 25)	2	0	(Nicaraguan Football Federation) Real Estelí
5	DF	Silvio Avilés	August 11, 1980 (aged 28)	14	0	(Nicaraguan Football Federation) Walter Ferretti
14	DF	Máximo Gámez	December 10, 1977 (aged 31)	0	0	(Nicaraguan Football Federation) Deportivo Ocotal
15	DF	Marvin Molina	December 21, 1981 (aged 27)	1	0	(Nicaraguan Football Federation) Real Estelí
6	MF	Armando Reyes	July 29, 1981 (aged 27)	8	0	(Nicaraguan Football Federation) Diriangén
7	MF	Franklin Lopez	August 16, 1982 (aged 26)	10	1	(Nicaraguan Football Federation) Real Estelí
11	MF	Félix Zeledón	November 24, 1983 (aged 25)	0	0	(Nicaraguan Football Federation) Real Estelí
16	MF	Marlon Medina	August 6, 1985 (aged 23)	0	0	(Nicaraguan Football Federation) Real Estelí
17	MF	Alexander Alvarado	January 10, 1982 (aged 27)	0	0	(Nicaraguan Football Federation) VCP Chinandega
18	MF	Edwin Herrera	September 29, 1988 (aged 20)	0	0	(Nicaraguan Football Federation) Deportivo Ocotal
19	MF	Juan Barrera	May 2, 1989 (aged 19)	0	0	(Nicaraguan Football Federation) Walter Ferreti
20	MF	José Carballo	April 23, 1987 (aged 21)	0	0	(Nicaraguan Football Federation) Managua F.C.
8	FW	Emilio Palacios	October 8, 1982 (aged 26)	18	11	(Nicaraguan Football Federation) Xilotepelt
9	FW	Wilber Sánchez	October 24, 1979 (aged 29)	5	0	(Nicaraguan Football Federation) Walter Ferretti
10	FW	Samuel Wilson	April 9, 1983 (aged 25)	8	2	(Nicaraguan Football Federation) Real Estelí
13	FW	Adrián Morales	January 17, 1982 (aged 27)	0	0	(Nicaraguan Football Federation) VCP Chinandega

== Group B ==
=== Costa Rica ===
Head coach: (Costa Rica) Rodrigo Kenton

No.	Pos.	Player	Date of birth (age)	Caps	Goals	Club
1	GK	Keylor Navas	December 15, 1986 (aged 22)	2	0	(Costa Rican Football Federation) Saprissa
18	GK	Patrick Pemberton	February 24, 1982 (aged 26)	0	0	(Costa Rican Football Federation) Alajuelense
23	GK	Ricardo González Fonseca	March 3, 1974 (aged 34)	34	0	(Costa Rican Football Federation) Herediano
2	DF	Daniel Torres	October 14, 1977 (aged 31)	0	0	(Norwegian Football Federation) Bryne FK
3	DF	Freddy Fernández	February 25, 1974 (aged 34)	9	1	(Costa Rican Football Federation) Pérez Zeledón
4	DF	Michael Umaña	July 16, 1982 (aged 26)	30	0	(Costa Rican Football Federation) Liberia Mía
12	DF	Leonardo González	November 21, 1980 (aged 28)	58	1	(Costa Rican Football Federation) Herediano
19	DF	Carlos Johnson	July 10, 1984 (aged 24)	3	0	(Norwegian Football Federation) Bryne FK
20	DF	Roberto Segura	October 22, 1981 (aged 27)	0	0	(Costa Rican Football Federation) Pérez Zeledón
5	MF	Cristian Oviedo	August 25, 1978 (aged 30)	0	0	(Costa Rican Football Federation) Alajuelense
8	MF	Oscar Granados	October 25, 1985 (aged 23)	0	0	(Costa Rican Football Federation) Cartaginés
10	MF	Yosimar Arias	June 1, 1984 (aged 24)	0	0	(Costa Rican Football Federation) Brujas
14	MF	Paolo Jiménez	January 28, 1984 (aged 24)	0	0	(Costa Rican Football Federation) Brujas
15	MF	Jorge Davis	November 8, 1985 (aged 23)	0	0	(Costa Rican Football Federation) Ramonense
16	MF	Pablo Brenes	November 4, 1982 (aged 26)	3	0	(Costa Rican Football Federation) Brujas
17	MF	Pablo Herrera	February 14, 1987 (aged 21)	3	0	(Costa Rican Football Federation) Alajuelense
22	MF	Álvaro Sánchez	August 2, 1984 (aged 24)	0	0	(Costa Rican Football Federation) San Carlos
7	FW	Alejandro Alpízar	January 27, 1984 (aged 24)	11	3	(Costa Rican Football Federation) Saprissa
11	FW	Andy Furtado	October 30, 1980 (aged 28)	2	0	(Costa Rican Football Federation) Herediano
21	FW	Victor Núñez	April 15, 1980 (aged 28)	17	6	(Costa Rican Football Federation) Liberia Mía

=== Guatemala ===
Head coach: (Guatemala) Benjamín Monterroso

No.	Pos.	Player	Date of birth (age)	Caps	Goals	Club
1	GK	Luis Pedro Molina	June 4, 1977 (aged 31)	14	0	(National Football Federation of Guatemala) Jalapa
18	GK	Ricardo Jerez	February 4, 1986 (aged 22)	3	0	(Uruguayan Football Association) Rentistas
2	DF	Carlos Castrillo	May 16, 1985 (aged 23)	7	0	(National Football Federation of Guatemala) Comunicaciones
3	DF	Cristian Noriega	March 20, 1987 (aged 21)	6	0	(National Football Federation of Guatemala) Municipal
4	DF	Yony Flores	February 16, 1983 (aged 25)	16	0	(National Football Federation of Guatemala) Marquense
5	DF	Carlos Eduardo Gallardo	April 8, 1984 (aged 24)	11	1	(National Football Federation of Guatemala) Comunicaciones
6	DF	Wilson Lalín	May 3, 1985 (aged 23)	3	0	(National Football Federation of Guatemala) Suchitepéquez
7	DF	Claudio Albizuris	July 1, 1981 (aged 27)	32	1	(National Football Federation of Guatemala) Municipal
15	DF	Edwin Enríquez	June 4, 1983 (aged 25)	1	1	(National Football Federation of Guatemala) Comunicaciones
16	DF	Jaime Vides	July 12, 1987 (aged 21)	6	0	(National Football Federation of Guatemala) Municipal
8	MF	Wilfred Velásquez	September 10, 1985 (aged 23)	1	0	(National Football Federation of Guatemala) Suchitepéquez
9	MF	Abner Trigueros	December 27, 1987 (aged 21)	10	2	(National Football Federation of Guatemala) Comunicaciones
10	MF	Léster Ruiz	March 8, 1981 (aged 27)	4	0	(National Football Federation of Guatemala) Xinabajul
11	MF	Marco Pablo Pappa	November 15, 1987 (aged 21)	4	1	(United States Soccer Federation) Chicago Fire
12	MF	Jean Márquez	March 6, 1985 (aged 23)	12	0	(National Football Federation of Guatemala) Comunicaciones
13	MF	Carlos Castillo	September 14, 1977 (aged 31)	22	1	(National Football Federation of Guatemala) Suchitepéquez
14	MF	Edgar Cotto	January 27, 1984 (aged 24)	3	0	(National Football Federation of Guatemala) Comunicaciones
17	FW	Minor López	February 1, 1987 (aged 21)	2	0	(National Football Federation of Guatemala) Xelajú
19	FW	Edwin Villatoro	February 18, 1980 (aged 28)	28	6	(National Football Federation of Guatemala) Suchitepéquez
20	FW	Selvin Motta	May 24, 1982 (aged 26)	5	0	(National Football Federation of Guatemala) Municipal

=== Panama ===
Head coach: (England) Gary Stempel

No.	Pos.	Player	Date of birth (age)	Caps	Goals	Club
1	GK	Jaime Penedo	September 26, 1981 (aged 27)	18	0	(National Football Federation of Guatemala) Municipal
12	GK	José Calderón	August 14, 1985 (aged 23)	3	0	(Panamanian Football Federation) Chepo
2	DF	Carlos Rivera	May 30, 1979 (aged 29)	51	2	(Panamanian Football Federation) San Francisco
3	DF	Joel Solanilla	December 24, 1983 (aged 25)	22	0	(Panamanian Football Federation) Sporting San Miguelito
4	DF	José Anthony Torres	August 8, 1972 (aged 36)	70	0	(National Football Federation of Guatemala) Deportivo Guastatoya
13	DF	Adolfo Machado	February 14, 1985 (aged 23)	6	0	(National Football Federation of Guatemala) Marquense
14	DF	Armando Gun	January 17, 1986 (aged 23)	7	0	(Panamanian Football Federation) Chepo
16	DF	Eduardo Jiménez	February 4, 1986 (aged 22)	2	0	(Panamanian Football Federation) San Francisco
5	MF	Manuel Torres	November 25, 1978 (aged 30)	24	1	(Panamanian Football Federation) San Francisco
6	MF	Amílcar Henríquez	August 2, 1983 (aged 25)	24	0	(Panamanian Football Federation) Árabe Unido
10	MF	Nelson Barahona	November 22, 1987 (aged 21)	5	0	(Panamanian Football Federation) Árabe Unido
11	MF	Víctor Herrera Piggott	April 18, 1980 (aged 28)	24	3	(Puerto Rican Football Federation) Sevilla Bayamón FC
15	MF	Ricardo Phillips	January 31, 1975 (aged 33)	74	10	(Panamanian Football Federation) Sporting San Miguelito
17	MF	Eybir Bonaga	May 19, 1986 (aged 22)	0	0	(Panamanian Football Federation) Atlético Chiriquí
20	MF	Luis Jaramillo	April 25, 1988 (aged 20)	0	0	(Panamanian Football Federation) Chepo
7	FW	Edwin Aguilar	August 7, 1985 (aged 23)	10	1	(Panamanian Football Federation) Tauro
8	FW	Gabriel Torres	October 31, 1988 (aged 20)	15	1	(Colombian Football Federation) América de Cali
9	FW	Orlando Rodríguez	August 9, 1984 (aged 24)	6	0	(Panamanian Football Federation) Árabe Unido
18	FW	Alberto Zapata	February 28, 1979 (aged 29)	16	1	(Panamanian Football Federation) San Francisco
19	FW	Manuel Mosquera	October 14, 1984 (aged 24)	0	0	(Panamanian Football Federation) Árabe Unido
