= 2006 UNCAF Interclub Cup =

2006 UNCAF international club football competition (24th edition)

Tournament details
- Dates: 22 August–29 November 2006
- Teams: 16 (from 7 associations)

Final positions
- Champions: (Costa Rica) Puntarenas (1st title)
- Runners-up: (Honduras) Olimpia

Tournament statistics
- Matches played: 32
- Goals scored: 77 (2.41 per match)

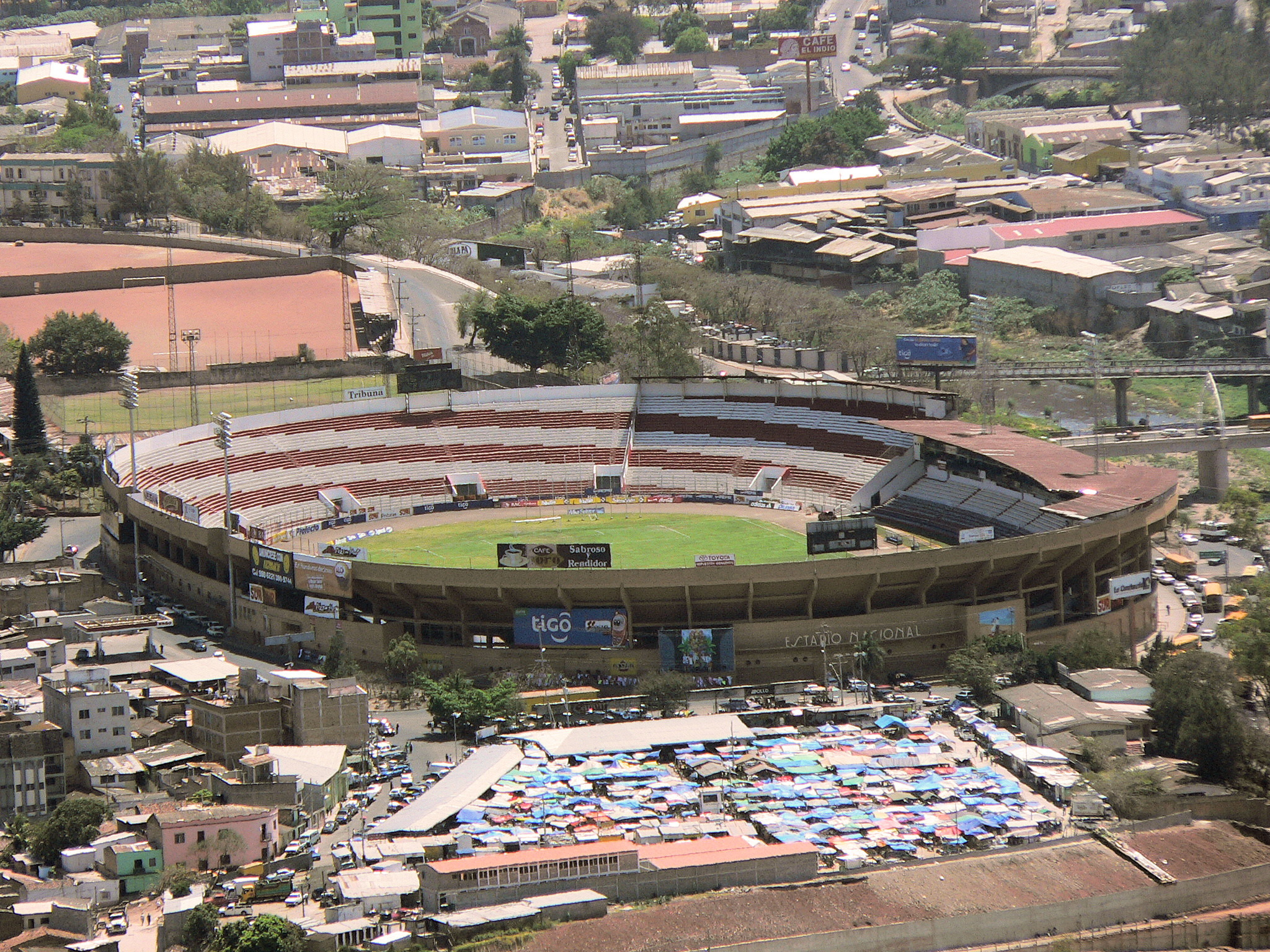

The 2006 UNCAF Interclub Cup was the 24th edition of the international club football competition held in the UNCAF region representing the seven nations of Central America. This was the eighth year of the current format using the name UNCAF Interclub Cup. The tournament was also a qualifying event for the 2007 CONCACAF Champions' Cup. Sixteen teams representing seven football associations took part, beginning with the first qualifying games on August 22, 2006. The tournament concluded with a two-legged final that was won by Puntarenas of Costa Rica making them the Central American club football champions. The top three finishers in the tournament qualify for the 2007 CONCACAF Champions' Cup.

== Bracket ==
First round
(Costa Rica)	Alajuelense	1	2	3
(El Salvador)	Vista Hermosa	0	1	1
(Costa Rica)	Puntarenas	5	1	6
(Belize)	Hankook Verdes	0	1	1
(Honduras)	Marathón	2	1	3
(El Salvador)	Águila	0	1	1
(Guatemala)	Marquense	3	0	3
(Panama)	Plaza Amador	0	0	0
(Nicaragua)	Real Estelí	1	0	1
(Costa Rica)	Saprissa	1	1	2
(Panama)	San Francisco	0	1	1
(Honduras)	Victoria	1	3	4
(Belize)	Wagiya	0	0	0
(Guatemala)	Municipal	2	8	10
(Nicaragua)	Diriangén	0	1	1
(Honduras)	Olimpia	3	2	5

Quarterfinals
(Costa Rica)	Alajuelense	0	0	0
(Costa Rica)	Puntarenas	3	2	5
(Honduras)	Marathón	1	0	1
(Guatemala)	Marquense	1	1	2
(Costa Rica)	Saprissa	1	0	1
(Honduras)	Victoria	0	2	2
(Guatemala)	Municipal	1	0	1
(Honduras)	Olimpia	1	3	4

Semifinals
(Costa Rica)	Puntarenas	2	0	2
(Guatemala)	Marquense	0	0	0
(Honduras)	Victoria	2	0	2
(Honduras)	Olimpia	2	2	4

Final
(Costa Rica)	Puntarenas	3	0	3
(Honduras)	Olimpia	2	1	3

== First round ==
24 August 2006

Alajuelense (Costa Rica)	1–0	(El Salvador) Vista Hermosa
Carlos Salazar 70'

Estadio Alejandro Morera Soto
Alajuela, Costa Rica
Attendance: n/a
Referee: Rolando Vidal (PAN)
30 August 2006

Vista Hermosa (El Salvador)	1–2	(Costa Rica) Alajuelense
Rene Alvarez 78'		Erick Jimenez 26'; Rolando Fonseca 75'

Estadio Juan Francisco Barraza
San Miguel, El Salvador
Attendance: n/a
Referee: José Pineda(HON)

Alajuelense advance 3-1 on aggregate.

22 August 2006

Puntarenas (Costa Rica)	5–0	(Belize) Hankook Verdes
Mario Camacho 34'; José Macotelo 59'; Kurt Bernard 64' (pen.); Kevin Sancho 65'; Jorge Barbosa 85'

Estadio Lito Pérez
Puntarenas, Costa Rica
Attendance: n/a
Referee: Rene Guerrero (NIC)
31 August 2006

Hankook Verdes (Belize)	1–1	(Costa Rica) Puntarenas
Deris Benavides 13'		Rodolfo Arnáez Villegas 15'

Norman Broaster Stadium
San Ignacio Town, Belize
Attendance: 1,100
Referee: Walter Lopez (GUA)

Puntarenas advance 6-1 on aggregate.

24 August 2006

Marathón (Honduras)	2–0	(El Salvador) Águila
Walter Martinez 8'; Emil Martínez 29'

Estadio Francisco Morazán
San Pedro Sula, Honduras
Attendance: 2,863
Referee: Elmar Rodas (GUA)
31 August 2006

Águila (El Salvador)	1–1	(Honduras) Marathón
Luis Amaya 83'		Emil Martínez 9'

Estadio Juan Francisco Barraza
San Miguel, El Salvador
Attendance: n/a
Referee: Carlos Batres (GUA)

Marathón advance 3-1 on aggregate.

23 August 2006

Marquense (Guatemala)	3–0	(Panama) Plaza Amador
César Alegría 31'; Ricardo Gutiérrez 48'; César Alegría 51'

Estadio Marquesa de la Ensenada
San Marcos, Guatemala
Attendance: n/a
Referee: Ricardo Zelaya (HON)
29 August 2006

Plaza Amador (Panama)	0–0	(Guatemala) Marquense

Estadio Rommel Fernández
Panama City, Panama
Attendance: 200
Referee: Joel Aguilar (ELS)

Marquense advance 3-0 on aggregate.

23 August 2006

Real Estelí (Nicaragua)	1–1	(Costa Rica) Saprissa
Victor Sánchez 22'		Alonso Solis 76'

Estadio Independencia
Estelí, Nicaragua
Attendance: n/a
Referee: Roberto Moreno (PAN)
29 August 2006

Saprissa (Costa Rica)	1–0	(Nicaragua) Real Estelí
Walter Centeno 53'

Estadio Ricardo Saprissa
San Juan de Tibás, Costa Rica
Attendance: 0 (banned)
Referee: Lucinio Rodriguez (HON)

Saprissa advance 2-1 on aggregate.

23 August 2006

San Francisco (Panama)	0–1	(Honduras) Victoria
		Fabio de Souza 4'

Estadio Agustín "Muquita" Sánchez
La Chorrera, Panama
Attendance: n/a
Referee: Edgar Rodriguez (CRC)
30 August 2006

Victoria (Honduras)	3–1	(Panama) San Francisco
Jeffrey Brooks 19'; Jose Luis Grant 53'; Carlos Moran 68'		Ruben Gamboa 61'

Estadio Nilmo Edwards
La Ceiba, Honduras
Attendance: 2,407
Referee: Vinicio Mena (CRC)

Victoria advance 4-1 on aggregate.

22 August 2006

Wagiya (Belize)	0–2	(Guatemala) Municipal
		Edwin Villatoro 12'; Edwin Villatoro 72'

Carl Ramos Stadium
Dangriga, Belize
Attendance: n/a
Referee: William Mendoza (CRC)
31 August 2006

Municipal (Guatemala)	8–0	(Belize) Wagiya
Edwin Villatoro 16'; Claudio Albizuris 46'; Selvin Motta 55'; Edwin Villatoro 60'; Selvin Motta 74'; Edwin Villatoro 79'; Edwin Villatoro 81'; Own goal 90'

Estadio Manuel Felipe Carrera
Guatemala City, Guatemala
Attendance: n/a
Referee: Donald Campos (NIC)

Municipal advance 10-0 on aggregate.

22 August 2006

Diriangén (Nicaragua)	0–3/f	(Honduras) Olimpia
Ricardo Valenzuela 5'		Luciano Emilio 39'; Luciano Emilio 90'

Estadio Cacique Diriangén
Diriamba, Nicaragua
Attendance: 2,500
Referee: Ricardo Cerdas (CRC)

/f match forfeited^{1}- Diriangén used ineligible players, and CONCACAF awarded Olimpia a 3–0 win.^{1}

30 August 2006

Olimpia (Honduras)	2–1	(Nicaragua) Diriangén
Milton Palacios 8'; Luciano Emilio 72'		Ricardo Valenzuela 4'

Estadio Nacional Chelato Uclés
Tegucigalpa, Honduras
Attendance: 1,128
Referee: Jose Ángel Rodríguez (PAN)

Olimpia advance 5-1 on aggregate.

== Quarterfinals ==
20 September 2006

Alajuelense (Costa Rica)	0–3	(Costa Rica) Puntarenas
		Mario Camacho 15'; José Macotelo 78'; Álvaro Guerrero 89'

Estadio Alejandro Morera Soto
Alajuela, Costa Rica
Attendance: n/a
Referee: Oscar Bardelez (HON)
27 August 2006

Puntarenas (Costa Rica)	2–0	(Costa Rica) Alajuelense
Kurt Bernard 26' (pen.); José Macotelo 77'

Estadio Lito Pérez
Puntarenas, Costa Rica
Attendance: 2,000
Referee: Carlos Batres (GUA)

Puntarenas advance 5-0 on aggregate.

28 September 2006

Marathón (Honduras)	1–1	(Guatemala) Marquense
Marcelo Segales 38'		César Alegría 37'

Estadio Francisco Morazán
San Pedro Sula, Honduras
Attendance: 5,057
Referee: Walter Queseda (CRC)
3 October 2006

Marquense (Guatemala)	1–0	(Honduras) Marathón
Cristian Cayeta 86' (pen.)

Estadio Marquesa de la Ensenada
San Marcos, Guatemala
Attendance: 7,000
Referee: Rolando Vidal (PAN)

Marquense advance 2-1 on aggregate.

26 September 2006

Saprissa (Costa Rica)	1–0	(Honduras) Victoria
Gabriel Badilla 27'

Estadio Ricardo Saprissa
San Juan de Tibás, Costa Rica
Attendance: n/a
Referee: Elmar Rodas (GUA)
5 October 2006

Victoria (Honduras)	2–0	(Costa Rica) Saprissa
Hector Flores 3'; Fabio de Souza 74'

Estadio Nilmo Edwards
La Ceiba, Honduras
Attendance: 5,384
Referee: Roberto Moreno (PAN)

Victoria advance 2-1 on aggregate.

27 September 2006

Municipal (Guatemala)	1–1	(Honduras) Olimpia
Carlos Figueroa 59'		Luciano Emilio 78'

Estadio Doroteo Guamuch Flores
Guatemala City, Guatemala
Attendance: 5,000
Referee: Alexander Jimenez (CRC)
4 October 2006

Olimpia (Honduras)	3–0	(Guatemala) Municipal
Wilmer Velásquez 15'; Wilson Palacios 79'; Rony Morales 90'

Estadio Nacional Chelato Uclés
Tegucigalpa, Honduras
Attendance: 5,370
Referee: Joel Aguilar (ELS)

Olimpia advance 4-1 on aggregate.

== Semifinals ==
25 October 2006

Puntarenas (Costa Rica)	2–0	(Guatemala) Marquense
Vicente Rosella 62'; Álvaro Guerrero 77'

Estadio Lito Pérez
Puntarenas, Costa Rica
Attendance: n/a
Referee: Joel Aguilar (ELS)
31 October 2006

Marquense (Guatemala)	0–0	(Costa Rica) Puntarenas

Estadio Marquesa de la Ensenada
San Marcos, Guatemala
Attendance: 6,500
Referee: José Pineda (HON)

Puntarenas qualify to 2007 CONCACAF Champions' Cup 2-0 on aggregate.

24 October 2006

Victoria (Honduras)	2–2	(Honduras) Olimpia
Jose Anthony 10'; Hector Flores 70'		Luciano Emilio 5'; Luciano Emilio 66'

Estadio Nilmo Edwards
La Ceiba, Honduras
Attendance: 7,915
Referee: Wálter Quesada (CRC)
31 October 2006

Olimpia (Honduras)	2–0	(Honduras) Victoria
Wilson Palacios 32'; Luciano Emilio 73'

Estadio Tiburcio Carías Andino
Tegucigalpa, Honduras
Attendance: 4,766
Referee: Carlos Batres (GUA)

Olimpia qualify to 2007 CONCACAF Champions' Cup 4-2 on aggregate.

== Third place ==
21 November 2006

Marquense (Guatemala)	3–0	(Honduras) Victoria
Erick Priego 5'; Erick Priego 37'; Ricardo Gutiérrez 87'

Estadio Marquesa de la Ensenada
San Marcos, Guatemala
Attendance: n/a
Referee: Wálter Quesada (CRC)
28 November 2006

Victoria (Honduras)	1–1	(Guatemala) Marquense
Carlos Morán 2'		César Alegría 61'

Estadio Nilmo Edwards
La Ceiba, Honduras
Attendance: 1,245
Referee: Joel Aguilar (ELS)

Marquense qualify to 2007 CONCACAF Champions' Cup 4-1 on aggregate.

== Final ==
22 November 2006

Puntarenas (Costa Rica)	3–2	(Honduras) Olimpia
Kurt Bernard 43'; Álvaro Guerrero 70'; Álvaro Guerrero 90'		Nahún Avila 27'; Wilson Palacios 75'

Estadio Lito Pérez
Puntarenas, Costa Rica
Attendance: n/a
Referee: Rolando Vidal (PAN)
29 November 2006

Olimpia (Honduras)	3–2	(Costa Rica) Puntarenas
Luciano Emilio 14' Àlbaro Guerrero 79' Kurt Bernard 89'		Nahûm Avila 55' Wilson Palacios 84'
Penalties
Danilo Tosello (penalty missed); Arnold Cruz (penalty scored); Juan Pedro Yalet (penalty missed); Mynor Figueroa (penalty missed)	1–3	Max Sanchez (penalty scored); Roberto Wong (penalty scored); Vicente Rocella (penalty scored)

Estadio Tiburcio Carías Andino
Tegucigalpa, Honduras
Referee: Carlos Batres(GUA)

Champion Puntarenas of the 2006 UNCAF Club Cup, and runner up Olimpia qualify to 2007 CONCACAF Champions' Cup.

== Trivia ==
- At the quarter-finals there were 2 clubs with a Monster as team mascot and 3 clubs with a Lion as mascot.
- The winning team received $10,000 as a prize
