= Florencio =

Florencio is a name which may refer to:

== Given name ==
- Florencio de Valeránica, 10th century Castilian monk, scribe and miniaturist
- Florencio Abad (born 1954), Filipino lawyer and politician
- Florêncio Carlos de Abreu e Silva (1839–1881), Brazilian lawyer, journalist, writer and politician
- Florencio Flores Aguilar, Panamanian colonel, commander of the Panamanian Guardia Nacional in 1981
- Florencio Amarilla (1935–2012), Paraguayan footballer and coach
- Florencio Harmodio Arosemena (1872–1945), President of Panama from 1928 to 1931
- Florencio Campomanes (1927–2010), Filipino political scientist and chess player and organizer
- Florencio Molina Campos (1891–1959), Argentine illustrator and painter who also worked with Walt Disney
- Florencio del Castillo (1778–1834), Costa Rican cleric and politician
- Florencio Constantino (1869–1919), Spanish operatic tenor
- Florencio Cornelia (born 1981), Dutch footballer
- Florencio Durán, Chilean politician, President of the Senate of Chile from 1941 to 1944
- Florencio García Goyena (1783–1855), Spanish jurist
- Florencio Martínez (born 1986), Guatemalan footballer
- Florencio Miraflores (born 1951), Filipino politician
- Florencio Morales Ramos (1915–1989), Puerto Rican singer, trovador and composer
- Florencio Olvera Ochoa (1933–2020), Mexican Roman Catholic bishop
- Florencio Randazzo (born 1964), Argentine politician
- Florencio Sánchez (1875–1910), Uruguayan playwright, journalist and political figure
- Florencio Varela (writer) (1808–1848), Argentine writer, poet, journalist and educator
- Florencio Vargas (1931–2010), Filipino politician
- Florencio Xatruch (1811–1893), Honduran general

== Surname ==
- Danny Florencio (1947–2018), pioneer of the Philippine Basketball Association
- Dinei Florencio, an electrical engineer
- John Florencio, Filipino American pianist
- Ngerak Florencio, Palauan sprinter
- Renato Dirnei Florêncio (born 1979), Brazilian footballer
- Ricardo Soares Florêncio (born 1976), Brazilian retired footballer
- Xavier Florencio (born 1979), Spanish professional road bicycle racer
- Jewel Florencio (2008)

== See also ==
- Florian (name)
