= Freddy Fernández =

Freddy Fernández may refer to:

- Freddy Fernández (actor) (1934–1995), Mexican actor
- Freddy Fernández (footballer) (born 1974), Costa Rican footballer
