= Edwin González =

Edwin González may refer to:

- Edwin González (Guatemalan footballer) (born 1982)
- Edwin González (Salvadoran footballer) (born 1977)
