= Eliud Zeledón =

Nicaraguan footballer (born 1983)

Personal information
- Full name: Félix Eliud Zeledón Zeledón
- Date of birth: November 24, 1983 (age 42)
- Place of birth: Estelí, Nicaragua
- Position: Defender

Team information
- Current team: Real Estelí
- Number: 3

Senior career*
Years	Team	Apps	(Gls)
2004–2009	Real Estelí		
2009	Chinandega		
2010–	Real Estelí		

International career^{‡}
2009–2013	Nicaragua	24	(1)
- * Club domestic league appearances and goals ‡ National team caps and goals as of 18 January 2014

Félix Eliud Zeledón Zeledón (born November 24, 1983) is a Nicaraguan footballer who plays for Real Estelí in the Primera División de Nicaragua.

== Club career ==
He joined VCP Chinandega from hometown club Real Estelí in summer 2009, but returned to Estelí a half year later.

== International career ==
Zeledón made his debut for Nicaragua in a January 2009 UNCAF Nations Cup match against El Salvador and has, as of December 2013, earned a total of 24 caps, scoring 1 goal. He has represented his country in 4 FIFA World Cup qualification matches and played at the 2009, 2011 and 2013 UNCAF Nations Cupss as well as at the 2009 CONCACAF Gold Cup.

=== International goals ===
Scores and results list Nicaragua's goal tally first.

N.	Date	Venue	Opponent	Score	Result	Competition
1.	26 February 2012	Dennis Martínez National Stadium, Managua, Nicaragua	Puerto Rico	4–1	4–1	Friendly match
