= Dinei =

Dinei is a given name. Dinei may refer to:

- Dinei (footballer, born 1970), Claudinei Alexandre Pires, Brazilian football striker
- Dinei (footballer, born 1971), Valdinei Rocha de Oliveira, Brazilian football forward
- Dinei (footballer, born 1979), Vatinei César Moreira dos Santos, Brazilian football midfielder
- Dinei (footballer, born 1981), Ednet Luís De Oliveira, Brazilian football striker
- Dinei (footballer, born 1983), Telmário de Araújo Sacramento, Brazilian football striker
- Dinei Florencio (fl. 2016), American electrical engineer

== See also ==
- Diney (disambiguation)
