= Football at the 2002 Central American and Caribbean Games =

2002 international football tournament

Tournament details
- Host country: El Salvador
- City: San Salvador
- Dates: 23 November – 7 December
- Teams: 12 (from 2 confederations)
- Venues: 2 (in 1 host city)

Final positions
- Champions: El Salvador (2nd title)
- Runners-up: Mexico
- Third place: Costa Rica
- Fourth place: Haiti

Tournament statistics
- Matches played: 20
- Goals scored: 48 (2.4 per match)
- Top scorer: (Mexico) Juan Carlos Cacho (3 goals)

The association football competition at the 2002 Central American and Caribbean Games was held between 23 November and 7 December 2002, although qualification took place beforehand. El Salvador, the tournament's host, drew with Mexico in the final 1–1, eventually defeating Mexico in a penalty shoot-out 4–3, winning its second title and the first title since 1954.

== Participants ==
Twelve nations participated in the tournament, and all of the teams sent were each nation's U-21 team. Cuba withdrew and was replaced by the Dominican Republic. Ten of the teams which participated were from CONCACAF with the remaining two being from CONMEBOL.

CONCACAF (10)

- Barbados
- Costa Rica
- ~~Cuba~~ (withdrew)
- Dominican Republic (replaced Cuba)
- El Salvador (hosts)
- Guatemala
- Haiti
- Honduras
- Jamaica
- Nicaragua
- Mexico

CONMEBOL (2)

- Colombia
- Venezuela

=== Medal winners ===
Event	Gold	Silver	Bronze
Men's football	El Salvador (SLV)	Mexico (MEX)	Costa Rica (CRC)

== Venues ==
San Salvador	Football at the 2002 Central American and Caribbean Games is located in El Salvador	San Salvador
Estadio Nacional Flor Blanca	Football at the 2002 Central American and Caribbean Games is located in El Salvador	Estadio Cuscatlán
Capacity: 35,000	Football at the 2002 Central American and Caribbean Games is located in El Salvador	Capacity: 53,400
Estadio Nacional Flor Blanca	Football at the 2002 Central American and Caribbean Games is located in El Salvador	Estadio Cuscatlán

== Preliminary round ==
=== Group 1 ===
Pos	Team	Pld	W	D	L	GF	GA	GD	Pts	Qualification
1	Haiti	2	1	0	1	3	3	0	3	Qualification for final round
2	Guatemala	2	1	0	1	3	3	0	3	Qualification for final round
3	Colombia	2	1	0	1	1	1	0	3	

Source: RSSSF
24 November 2002

Colombia	0–1	Guatemala
		Mota 68'

Estadio Cuscatlán, San Salvador, El Salvador
Referee: Marco Antonio Ramírez (Mexico)

26 November 2002

Guatemala	2–3	Haiti
Antonio 4'; Guillaume 30' (o.g.)		Macéus 17'; Beaucicot 37'; Brunel 80'

Estadio Nacional Flor Blanca, San Salvador, El Salvador
Referee: Edgar Durán (Costa Rica)

28 November 2002

Colombia	1–0	Haiti
González 48'

Estadio Nacional Flor Blanca, San Salvador, El Salvador
Referee: Rodolfo Sibrián (El Salvador)

=== Group 2 ===
Pos	Team	Pld	W	D	L	GF	GA	GD	Pts	Qualification
1	Costa Rica	2	1	1	0	6	2	+4	4	Qualification for final round
2	Venezuela	2	1	1	0	4	1	+3	4	Qualification for final round
3	Barbados	2	0	0	2	1	8	−7	0	

Source: RSSSF
23 November 2002

Costa Rica	1–1	Venezuela
Scott 87'		Maldonado 17'

Estadio Cuscatlán, San Salvador, El Salvador
Referee: Joel Aguilar (El Salvador)

25 November 2002

Barbados	1–5	Costa Rica
Williams 18'		Scott 27'; Parks 49', 80'; Saborío 68' (pen.); Brenes 74'

Estadio Nacional Flor Blanca, San Salvador, El Salvador
Referee: Victor Sewart (Jamaica)

27 November 2002

Barbados	0–3	Venezuela
		Maldonado 15'; Isea 18'; Arismendi 35'

Estadio Nacional Flor Blanca, San Salvador, El Salvador
Referee: Fredy Rolando Burgos (Guatemala)

=== Group 3 ===
Pos	Team	Pld	W	D	L	GF	GA	GD	Pts	Qualification
1	Mexico	2	1	1	0	5	2	+3	4	Qualification for final round
2	Honduras	2	1	0	1	4	4	0	3	Qualification for final round
3	Jamaica	2	0	1	1	1	4	−3	1	

Source: RSSSF
24 November 2002

Honduras	1–4	Mexico
Castro 20'		Cacho 11', 53', 67'; Márquez 70'

Estadio Cuscatlán, San Salvador, El Salvador
Referee: Fredy Rolando Burgos (Guatemala)

26 November 2002

Honduras	3–0	Jamaica
Ramírez 7'; Martínez 67'; Palacios 70'

Estadio Nacional Flor Blanca, San Salvador, El Salvador
Attendance: 3,000
Referee: Rodolfo Sibrián (El Salvador)

28 November 2002

Jamaica	1–1	Mexico
Wolfe 54'		Monjarraz 25'

Estadio Nacional Flor Blanca, San Salvador, El Salvador
Referee: Gustavo Brand (Venezuela)

=== Group 4 ===
Pos	Team	Pld	W	D	L	GF	GA	GD	Pts	Qualification
1	El Salvador	2	2	0	0	7	0	+7	6	Qualification for final round
2	Nicaragua	2	1	0	1	2	5	−3	3	Qualification for final round
3	Dominican Republic	2	0	0	2	1	5	−4	0	

Source: RSSSF
23 November 2002

El Salvador	4–0	Nicaragua
Torres 64'; A. Mejía 66'; D. Mejía 80', 90+1'

Estadio Cuscatlán, San Salvador, El Salvador
Referee: Gustavo Brand (Venezuela)

25 November 2002

Dominican Republic	1–2	Nicaragua
Ramírez 7'		Martínez 67'; Palacios 70'

Estadio Nacional Flor Blanca, San Salvador, El Salvador
Referee: Jorge Hoyos (Colombia)

27 November 2002

El Salvador	3–0	Dominican Republic
Galdámez 4'; Ochoa 55', 67'

Estadio Nacional Flor Blanca, San Salvador, El Salvador
Referee: Marco Antonio Ramírez (Mexico)

== Final round ==
=== Bracket ===
Quarterfinals
30 November – Cuscatlán
Haiti	2
Nicaragua	0
1 December – Cuscatlán
El Salvador	1
Venezuela	0
1 December – Cuscatlán
Mexico (p)	1(4)
Guatemala	1(3)
30 November – Cuscatlán
Costa Rica	1
Honduras	0

Semifinals
4 December – Cuscatlán
Haiti	0
El Salvador	1
4 December – Cuscatlán
Costa Rica	0
Mexico	1

Final
6 December – Cuscatlán
El Salvador (p)	1(4)
Mexico	1(3)
Third place match
6 December – Cuscatlán
Costa Rica (p)	0(4)
Haiti	0(1)

=== Quarterfinals ===
30 November 2002

Haiti	2–0	Nicaragua
Turlien 15'; Macéus 39'

Estadio Cuscatlán, San Salvador, El Salvador
Referee: Victor Sewart (Jamaica)

30 November 2002

Costa Rica	1–0	Honduras
Saborío 11' (pen.)

Estadio Cuscatlán, San Salvador, El Salvador
Referee: Rodolfo Sibrián (El Salvador)

1 December 2002

Mexico	1–1 (a.e.t.)	Guatemala
Pérez 31'		Albizuris 14'
Penalties
A. Hernández (penalty scored); Íñiguez (penalty scored); Pérez (penalty scored); Martínez (penalty scored)	4–3	(penalty scored) Zacarías; (penalty missed) Thompson; (penalty scored) Néstor; (penalty scored) Ortíz; (penalty missed) V. Hernández

Estadio Cuscatlán, San Salvador, El Salvador
Referee: Gustavo Brand (Venezuela)

1 December 2002

El Salvador	1–0	Venezuela
Pacheco 63'

Estadio Cuscatlán, San Salvador, El Salvador
Referee: Fredy Rolando Burgos (Guatemala)

=== Semifinals ===
4 December 2002

Haiti	0–1	El Salvador
		J. Mejía 6'

Estadio Cuscatlán, San Salvador, El Salvador
Attendance: 10,000
Referee: Marco Antonio Ramírez (Mexico)

4 December 2002

Costa Rica	0–1	Mexico
		Monjarraz 68'

Estadio Cuscatlán, San Salvador, El Salvador
Referee: Gustavo Brand (Venezuela)

=== Third place match ===
6 December 2002

Costa Rica	0–0 (a.e.t.)	Haiti
Penalties
Salazar (penalty scored); López (penalty scored); Villalobos (penalty scored); Scott (penalty scored)	4–1	(penalty missed) Chéry; (penalty scored) Guillaume; (penalty missed) Macéus

Estadio Cuscatlán, San Salvador, El Salvador
Attendance: 3,500
Referee: Rodolfo Sibrián (El Salvador)

=== Final ===
6 December 2002

El Salvador	1–1 (a.e.t.)	Mexico
Galdámez 45+2'		Márquez 14'
Penalties
Murgas (penalty scored); Pacheco (penalty scored); Menjívar (penalty scored); González (penalty scored)	4–3	(penalty missed) Pérez; (penalty scored) Lozano; (penalty scored) Rojas; (penalty scored) Martínez; (penalty missed) Cacho

Estadio Cuscatlán, San Salvador, El Salvador
Attendance: 20,000
Referee: Fredy Rolando Burgos (Guatemala)

2002 Central American
and Caribbean Games

El Salvador
2nd title

== Statistics ==
=== Goalscorers ===
There were 48 goals scored in 20 matches, for an average of 2.4 goals per match.

3 goals

- (Mexico) Juan Carlos Cacho

2 goals

- (Costa Rica) Winston Parks
- (Costa Rica) Álvaro Saborío
- (El Salvador) Josué Galdámez
- (El Salvador) Roberto Ochoa
- (El Salvador) Diego Mejía
- (Haiti) Jean-Jude Macéus
- (Mexico) Rafael Márquez
- (Mexico) Omar Monjarraz
- (Venezuela) Giancarlo Maldonado

1 goal

- (Barbados) Riviere Williams
- (Colombia) Felipe González
- (Costa Rica) Pablo Brenes
- (Costa Rica) Berny Scott
- (Costa Rica) Erick Scott
- (Dominican Republic) Amauris Ramírez
- (El Salvador) Antonio Mejía
- (El Salvador) Jose Mejía
- (El Salvador) Alfredo Pacheco
- (El Salvador) William Torres
- (Guatemala) Claudio Albizuris
- (Guatemala) José Antonio
- (Guatemala) Selvín Mota
- (Haiti) Anel Beaucicot
- (Haiti) Fucien Brunel
- (Haiti) Romulus Turlien
- (Honduras) Mauricio Castro
- (Honduras) D.M. Martínez
- (Honduras) Emilio Palacios
- (Honduras) Amauris Ramírez
- (Jamaica) Woolery Wolfe
- (Mexico) Luis Ernesto Pérez
- (Nicaragua) D.M. Martínez
- (Nicaragua) Emilio Palacios
- (Venezuela) Daniel Arismendi
- (Venezuela) Wiswel Isea

1 own goal

- (Haiti) Stéphane Guillaume (against Guatemala)

=== Final rankings ===
Pos	Team	Pld	W	D	L	GF	GA	GD	Pts	Final result
1	El Salvador	5	4	1	0	10	1	+9	13	Champions
2	Mexico	5	2	3	0	8	4	+4	9	Runners-up
3	Costa Rica	5	2	2	1	7	3	+4	8	Third place
4	Haiti	5	2	1	2	5	4	+1	7	Fourth place
5	Venezuela	3	1	1	1	4	2	+2	4	Eliminated in Quarterfinals
6	Guatemala	3	1	1	1	4	4	0	4	Eliminated in Quarterfinals
7	Honduras	3	1	0	2	4	5	−1	3	Eliminated in Quarterfinals
8	Nicaragua	3	1	0	2	2	7	−5	3	Eliminated in Quarterfinals
9	Colombia	2	1	0	1	1	1	0	3	Eliminated in Group stage
10	Jamaica	2	0	1	1	1	4	−3	1	Eliminated in Group stage
11	Dominican Republic	2	0	0	2	1	5	−4	0	Eliminated in Group stage
12	Barbados	2	0	0	2	1	8	−7	0	Eliminated in Group stage

Source: RSSSF
