= Edgar Cotto =

Guatemalan footballer

Personal information
- Full name: Edgar Aroldo Cotto González
- Date of birth: 27 January 1984 (age 42)
- Place of birth: Asunción Mita, Jutiapa Department, Guatemala
- Height: 1.75 m (5 ft 9 in)
- Position: Midfielder

Team information
- Current team: Xelajú

Senior career*
| Years | Team | Apps | (Gls) |
| 2002–2003 | Deportivo Achuapa | | |
| 2004 | Deportivo Mictlán | | |
| 2005 | Deportivo Petapa | | |
| 2006 | Cobán Imperial | | |
| 2007 | Deportivo Mictlán | | |
| 2007–2010 | Comunicaciones | | |
| 2010– | Xelajú | | |

International career^{‡}
| 2007–present | Guatemala | 6 | (0) |
- * Club domestic league appearances and goals as of 6 February 2010 ‡ National team caps and goals as of 6 February 2010

Edgar Cotto (born 27 January 1984) is a professional footballer who currently plays for Xelajú in Guatemala's top division, mostly in midfield.

== Club career ==
Cotto started playing for minor league teams and joined Comunicaciones in 2007 after scoring 10 goals in the 2007 Clausura for Deportivo Mictlán, which did not save his team from relegation.

== International career ==
Cotto made his debut for Guatemala as a late substitute in a November 2007 friendly match against Honduras and has, as of January 2010, earned a total of 6 caps, scoring no goals. He has represented his country at the UNCAF Nations Cup 2009.

== Personal life ==
Mother: Mirna Gozalez, Father: Aroldo Cotto Married on February 12, 2006, to Fatima, they have 1 daughter Genesis Ariana.
