= Pastor Fernández =

Costa Rican footballer (born 1963)

Personal information
- Full name: José Pastor Fernández Beita
- Date of birth: 22 April 1963 (age 63)
- Place of birth: San Isidro de El General, Costa Rica
- Position: Striker

Team information
- Current team: AD Sagrada Familia (manager)

Youth career
- General Viejo

Senior career*
Years	Team	Apps	(Gls)
1983–1986	Pérez Zeledón	60	(67)
1986–1990	Cartaginés	72	(69)
1990–1992	Alajuelense	63	(41)
1992–1993	San Carlos	33	(22)

International career^{‡}
1988–1989	Costa Rica	2	(1)
- * Club domestic league appearances and goals ‡ National team caps and goals as of 8 May 2010

José Pastor Fernández Beita (born 22 April 1963) is a former football player in the National League of Costa Rica during the 1980s.

== Club career ==
Fernández started his career in 1983 at second division Pérez Zeledón and later played for Cartaginés, Alajuelense and San Carlos. He retired from the game after 5 seasons in Costa Rica's Premier Division at the age of only 28.

== International career ==
=== Moment of glory ===
He became a national sports hero during the 1990 World Cup qualification, when he headed in the winning goal against El Salvador; that victory qualified Costa Rica for its inaugural World Cup.

During the previous games Evaristo Coronado had been the hero of the Costa Rican squad with his goals, most of which were headers. For the final game, however, Coronado was injured and Fernandez was picked as his replacement. Just as Coronado had been doing during the qualifying round, Fernandez headed in the winning goal.

=== From hero to zero ===
But he was not chosen by coach Velibor Milutinovic to go with the team to Italy, a decision he took very badly, feeling unappreciated by the Football Association as well. In protest, he gave up the sport after two years at Alajuelense and one at San Carlos and disappeared from the football scene. Coronado was also dropped for the World Cup, but he did continue his career. This contrast highlighted Fernandez's decision as an impetuous one, and although many Costa Ricans remember his name and appreciate his goal, few can mention his other accomplishments.

=== International goals ===
Scores and results list Costa Rica's goal tally first.

N.	Date	Venue	Opponent	Score	Result	Competition
1.	16 July 1989	Estadio Nacional de Costa Rica (1924), San José, Costa Rica	El Salvador	1–0	1–0	1990 FIFA World Cup qualification

== Retirement ==
After retiring he went into American clothing and later in sportswear.

He is currently working as a P.E teacher in a Costa Rican High School

== Personal life ==
Born in San Isidro de El General, his parents are Aricelda Beita and Ezequías Fernández. His brother Freddy has also played for the Costa Rica national team.

He is married and has three children.
