= Diney =

Diney is a nickname. It may refer to:

- Diney (footballer, born 1991), Valdisney Costa dos Santos, Brazilian football midfielder
- Diney (footballer, born 1995), Edilson Alberto Monteiro Sanches Borges, Cape Verdean football centre-back

== See also ==
- Dinei (disambiguation)
- Diné
