= Róger Mejía =

Nicaraguan footballer

Personal information
- Full name: Róger Daniel Mejía Cortez
- Date of birth: April 30, 1986 (age 40)
- Place of birth: Managua, Nicaragua
- Height: 1.75 m (5 ft 9 in)
- Position: Defender

Team information
- Current team: Diriangén
- Number: 21

Senior career*
Years	Team	Apps	(Gls)
2004–2009	América Managua		
2009–2010	Walter Ferretti		
2012–present	Diriangén		

International career
2007–2010	Nicaragua	5	(0)
- * Club domestic league appearances and goals

Róger Daniel Mejía Cortez (born April 30, 1986) is a Nicaraguan footballer who currently plays for Diriangén in the Primera División de Nicaragua.

== Club career ==
He has had a year training in Brazil at Tigres Do Brazil from August 2007. He started his professional career at hometown club América Managua and had a stint with Walter Ferretti before suddenly leaving for the United States in 2011.

In January 2012, Mejía returned to Nicaragua, signing for Diriangén.

== International career ==
Mejía made his debut for Nicaragua in a February 2007 UNCAF Nations Cup match against Guatemala and has, as of December 2013, earned a total of 5 caps, scoring no goals. He has represented his country at the 2007 UNCAF Nations Cup and was a non-playing squad member at the 2009 CONCACAF Gold Cup.

His most recent match was a September 2010 friendly match against Guatemala.

== Honors ==
Mejía played during the 2009 International Season when Nicaragua reached Round 1 of the Gold Cup.
