= Juan Carlos Cacho =

Mexican footballer (born 1982)

Personal information
- Full name: Juan Carlos Cacho Gutiérrez
- Date of birth: 3 May 1982 (age 44)
- Place of birth: Mexico City, Mexico
- Height: 1.77 m (5 ft 9 1/2 in)
- Position: Forward

Senior career*
Years	Team	Apps	(Gls)
2001–2004	Cruz Azul	68	(22)
2004–2008	Pachuca	141	(45)
2006	→ Indios UACJ (loan)	1	(0)
2008–2012	UNAM	85	(24)
2009–2010	→ Pachuca (loan)	23	(8)
2012–2013	→ Toluca (loan)	37	(5)
2014	Puebla	8	(0)
2015	Mérida	7	(1)
2016	Corinthians FC of San Antonio		
Total		370	(105)

International career
2007–2009	Mexico	11	(3)

Managerial career
- 2020–2021: Puebla Reserves and Academy
- 2021: Puebla (women)
- 2022–2023: Pachuca (women)
- 2024: Real Titán (AQL)
- 2025: Peluche Caligari (AKL)
Medal record
Representing Mexico
Third place	Copa America	2007
- * Club domestic league appearances and goals

Juan Carlos Cacho Gutiérrez (born 3 May 1982) is a Mexican former professional footballer and current manager of Liga MX Femenil club Pachuca.

== Club career ==
Juan Carlos Cacho Gutiérrez is a product of the youth system of Cruz Azul. He started his professional career in this club in 2001.

=== Cruz Azul ===
He debuted in Cruz Azul against Puebla on 14 February 2006. On 17 November 2006, his second game ever, he scored his first goal ever against Monterrey only having played 23 minutes. He did not really receive too many minutes until the Apertura 2002 when they put him in for 90 minutes and he scored 6 goals. The next tournament, with Abreu having an early departure in the early-half of the tournament because of contractual problems, Cacho became the team's prized forward with 8 goals in the regular league and two in the reclassification (in which Cruz Azul was eliminated). Unfortunately, Cacho was young and he was a local player which did not give him much priority with the different coaches that passed through Cruz Azul. In the tournament after, he was not able to play the first half of the tournament because Marcel Delgado and Cesar Delgado were brought to Cruz Azul. Cacho was finally put in as a starter in the last 5 games and was able to score 5 goals. In the reclassification and the quarter-finals, he was well covered by Tecos and Tigres, leaving Argentine Cesar Delgado, who had a great second game against Tigres, to take charge of the offense, so even though he was not scoring he was still a key element to the team. In the next league, Clausura 2004, Cacho, receiving very few minutes per game, went dry without having scored a single goal. Cruz Azul then sold Cacho to Pachuca for a sum of $10 million.

=== Pachuca ===
Cacho is one of the most notable players created by Cruz Azul, known for his agility, shooting ability, and the mind and composure as a forward. After transferring to Pachuca, he initially served as a substitute. Within 5 weeks, he scored his first goal against Tecos and later scored twice in 19 minutes of play against Cruz Azul. He concluded the tournament with goals in each of the final two regular-season games. Despite Pachuca being eliminated by Monterrey in the quarter-finals, Cacho finished the season with 5 goals.

Next league was not Cacho's nor Pachuca's league. Cacho scored against Atlante and against Monterrey, while Pachuca missed the playoffs. Although, it is quite impressive that Cacho's goal against Atlante was from half field going over Federico Vilar's head. Then in the first game of the Apertura 2005, Cacho entered for 21 minutes and won the game for Pachuca scoring another goal from half field this time over Christian Martinez head. He scored three more goals in the league, in which Pachuca won all three games. Then in the playoffs, Cacho and Landin shared the glory of getting Pachuca into the semi-finals where Toluca was able to stop Pachuca from advancing. Cacho did not have a good tournament the following season and only scored two goals, but Luis Angel Landín and Richard Nuñez were able to keep the team scoring and Pachuca was able to win the championship of the Liga MX against San Luis.

The next tournament, Cacho returned in full force and was the team's prized forward with 8 goals in the league and 4 goals in the Copa Nissan Sudamericana. Cacho now had a little of help to score goals and was not alone up in front. With Damian Alvarez, el 'Chaco' Gimenez, Andres Chitiva, Luis Angel Landín, Jaime Correa Córdoba and Gabriel Caballero alongside him, it made it a lot easier to score. This Pachuca team went to the semi-finals of the Mexican league and ended up being the first team from Mexico to ever win a competition set up by CONMEBOL, by beating Colo Colo in the final of La Copa Sudamericana.

In the Clausura 2007, he scored 8 goals in the regular league to match his previous season, while also scoring a goal in the final of la Copa de CONCACAF Campeones against Chivas, where Pachuca also ended up champion. Cacho also scored the 3 goals of his team against America in the two games of the Mexican final, two in the first game, and one in the second game becoming champion with Pachuca for the second time.

In July 2008, Cacho joined UNAM Pumas. He was loaned to C.F. Pachuca after being Drafted on the 2009 Draft. After Pachuca decided not to keep Cacho, he was back in Pumas.

== International career ==
Cacho has recently been called up for the Mexico national team debuting in the Copa America in a stunning 2–0 win against Brazil. On 12 September 2007, he scored his first goal against Brazil, the team he debuted against a few months prior. He scored 3 goals in 2 games.

=== International goals ===
No.	Date	Venue	Opponent	Score	Result	Competition	Ref.
1.	12 September 2007	Gillette Stadium, Foxboro, United States	Brazil	1–0	1–3	Friendly	
2.	14 October 2007	Estadio Olímpico Benito Juárez, Ciudad Juárez, Mexico	Nigeria	1–2	2–2	Friendly	
3.	14 October 2007	Estadio Olímpico Benito Juárez, Ciudad Juárez, Mexico	Nigeria	2–2	2–2	Friendly	

== Honours ==
Pachuca

- Mexican Championship: Clausura 2006, Clausura 2007
- CONCACAF Champions' Cup: 2007, 2008, 2009–10
- Copa Sudamericana: 2006
- North American SuperLiga: 2007

UNAM

- Mexican Championship: Clausura 2009, Clausura 2011

Mexico U23

- CONCACAF Olympic Qualifying Championship: 2004

Individual

- Central American and Caribbean Games Top Scorer: 2002
