= Félix Montoya =

Costa Rican footballer (born 1980)

Personal information
- Full name: Félix Montoya Ordóñez
- Date of birth: 28 March 1980 (age 46)
- Place of birth: Liberia, Costa Rica
- Height: 1.71 m (5 ft 7 in)
- Position: Midfielder

Senior career*
Years	Team	Apps	(Gls)
2000–2001	Saprissa		
2001–2004	Liberia	24	(2)
2004–2006	Puntarenas	52	(4)
2006–10	Herediano	114	(6)
2010–2013	San Carlos	88	(7)
2012–2014	Cartaginés	38	(1)
2014–2016	Pérez Zeledón	74	(7)
2016–2018	Municipal Liberia	82	(6)
2018–2019	Carmelita	27	(0)

International career
2007	Costa Rica	5	(0)
- * Club domestic league appearances and goals

Félix Montoya Ordóñez (born 28 March 1980 in Guanacaste Province) is a retired Costa Rican professional footballer.

== Club career ==
A much-travelled midfielder, Montoya came through the Saprissa youth system and played one season for them, then played for hometown club Liberia Mia, Herediano, Puntarenas and again Herediano whom he left in 2010 after the club wouldn't meet his financial demands.

He then moved to San Carlos and Cartaginés, by whom he was released in March 2014. He subsequently joined Pérez Zeledón before the 2014 Invierno season.

== International career ==
Montoya has made 5 appearances for the senior Costa Rica national football team, his debut coming in a friendly against Trinidad & Tobago on February 4, 2007. He appeared in three matches as Costa Rica won the UNCAF Nations Cup 2007 tournament.
