= Josué Galdámez =

Salvadoran footballer (born 1982)

Personal information
- Full name: Josué Naun Galdámez Domínguez
- Date of birth: December 18, 1982 (age 43)
- Place of birth: Usulután, El Salvador
- Height: 1.69 m (5 ft 7 in)
- Positions: Midfielder; striker

Senior career*
Years	Team	Apps	(Gls)
1998–2000	El Vencedor	32	(28)
2000–2005	Municipal Limeño	167	(32)
2005	Águila	27	(11)
2006–2007	Chalatenango	59	(22)
2007–2009	Municipal Limeño	21	(7)
2009–2010	Atlético Balboa	26	(3)
2011	Aspirante	29	(9)
2012	Pasaquina	32	(7)
2013	Luis Ángel Firpo	7	(0)

International career
2001–2007	El Salvador	54	(11)
Medal record
Representing El Salvador
Men's Football
Central American and Caribbean Games
Gold medal – first place	2002 El Salvador	Team competition
- * Club domestic league appearances and goals

Josué Nahúm Galdámez Domínguez (born December 18, 1982, in Usulután, El Salvador) is a former Salvadoran professional footballer.

== Club career ==
He started his professional career at Second Division side El Vencedor and made his debut at the highest level, the Primera División de Fútbol de El Salvador, for a five year tenure with Municipal Limeño.

He then joined Salvadoran giants Águila together with his Municipal Limeño teammates Edwin González and Deris Umanzor only to leave them after a short spell for Chalatenango. In 2007, he returned to Municipal Limeño, then at the second level but jumped back to the Primera División with Atlético Balboa.

== International career ==
Galdámez made his debut for El Salvador in a March 2001 friendly match against Guatemala and has earned a total of 54 caps, scoring 11 goals. He has represented his country in 18 FIFA World Cup qualification matches and played at the 2001, 2003 and 2007 UNCAF Nations Cups as well as at the 2002 CONCACAF Gold Cup.

His final international game was a February 2007 UNCAF Nations Cup match, against Guatemala.

=== International goals ===
Scores and results list El Salvador's goal tally first.

#	Date	Venue	Opponent	Score	Result	Competition
1	3 June 2001	Estadio Olímpico Metropolitano, San Pedro Sula, Honduras	Costa Rica	1-0	1-1	2001 UNCAF Nations Cup
2	9 February 2003	Estadio Rommel Fernández, Panama City, Panama	Panama	1-1	2-1	2003 UNCAF Nations Cup

== Post-football career ==
Galdámez currently own and run JG Sport, who currently sponsors Salvadoran club El Vencedor.
