= Silvio Avilés =

Nicaraguan footballer

Personal information
- Full name: Silvio Ernesto Avilés Ramos
- Date of birth: August 11, 1980 (age 46)
- Place of birth: Jinotepe, Nicaragua
- Height: 1.68 m (5 ft 6 in)
- Position: Defender

Team information
- Current team: Managua
- Number: 19

Senior career*
Years	Team	Apps	(Gls)
2001–2007	Diriangén		
2008–2011	Walter Ferretti		
2012–present	Managua		

International career^{‡}
2003–2010	Nicaragua	22	(0)
- * Club domestic league appearances and goals ‡ National team caps and goals as of 16 June 2013

Silvio Ernesto Avilés Ramos (born 11 August 1980) is a Nicaraguan footballer who currently plays for Managua in the Primera División de Nicaragua.

== Club career ==
A leftback, Avilés started his career at Diriangén and also played for Walter Ferretti from 2008, before joining Managua in January 2012.

== International career ==
Avilés made his debut for Nicaragua in a February 2003 UNCAF Nations Cup match against El Salvador and has, as of December 2013, earned a total of 22 caps, scoring no goals. He has represented his country in 2 FIFA World Cup qualification matches and played at the 2003, 2005, 2007, and 2009 UNCAF Nations Cups as well as at the 2009 CONCACAF Gold Cup.

His final international was a September 2010 friendly match against Guatemala.
