= Álvaro Sánchez =

Costa Rican footballer (born 1984)

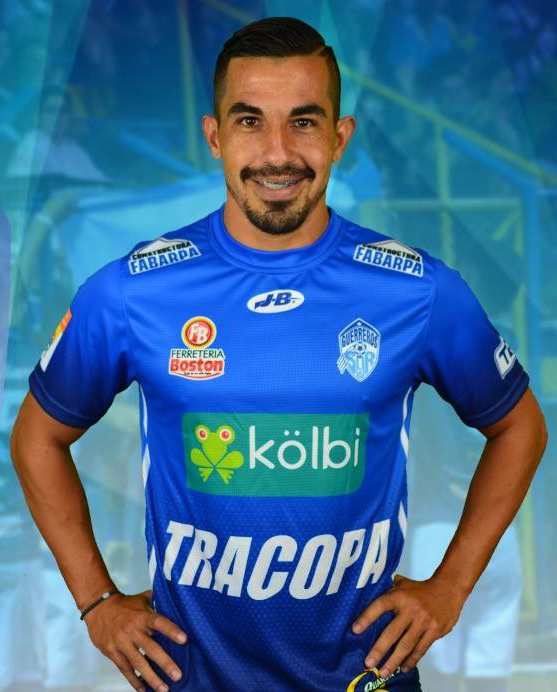
- Sánchez in 2017

Personal information
- Full name: Álvaro Sánchez Alfaro
- Date of birth: August 2, 1984 (age 42)
- Place of birth: Ciudad Quesada, Costa Rica
- Height: 5 ft 6 in (1.68 m)
- Position: Attacking midfielder

Team information
- Current team: Grecia
- Number: 10

Youth career
- –2002: Grecia
- 2002–2003: Saprissa
- 2003–2007: Grecia

Senior career*
Years	Team	Apps	(Gls)
2007–2012	San Carlos	129	(43)
2009	→ FC Dallas (loan)	3	(0)
2012–2015	Alajuelense	62	(17)
2015	Cartaginés	15	(1)
2015–2016	Uruguay de Coronado	8	(3)
2016	Carmelita	5	(0)
2016–2017	San Carlos	22	(6)
2017–2019	Pérez Zeledón	28	(5)
2018	→ San Carlos (loan)	0	(0)
2019	→ Grecia (loan)	17	(3)
2020–	Grecia	42	(5)

International career
2009–2012	Costa Rica	12	(3)
- * Club domestic league appearances and goals as of 17 February 2021 (UTC)

Álvaro Sánchez Alfaro (born August 2, 1984) is a Costa Rican footballer who currently plays for Municipal Grecia.

== Career ==
=== Club ===
Before he signed for Alajuelense, Sánchez had been a member of the Primera División de Costa Rica team San Carlos for whom he made his debut on 7 March 2007. He signed on loan with Major League Soccer side FC Dallas in March 2009.

He joined Liga in summer 2012.

=== International ===
Sánchez appeared in 4 games, scoring 2 goals, with the Costa Rica national football team at the UNCAF Nations Cup 2009. He made his debut for the senior side in the first match of the tournament against Panama, following an injury to teammate Yosimar Arias.

== International goals ==
#	Date	Venue	Opponent	Score	Result	Competition
1	January 23, 2009	Estadio Tiburcio Carías Andino, Tegucigalpa, Honduras	Panama	3- 0	3 - 0	2009 UNCAF Nations Cup
2	January 25, 2009	Estadio Tiburcio Carías Andino, Tegucigalpa, Honduras	Guatemala	1-0	3 - 1	2009 UNCAF Nations Cup
3	May 25, 2012	Estadio Nacional, San José, Costa Rica	Guatemala	2-1	3 - 2	Friendly
