= Carlos Quiñónez (footballer, born 1977) =

Guatemalan footballer

Personal information
- Full name: Carlos Vinicio Quiñónez Sánchez
- Date of birth: July 20, 1977 (age 49)
- Place of birth: Puerto Barrios, Guatemala
- Height: 1.80 m (5 ft 11 in)
- Position: Midfielder

Senior career*
Years	Team	Apps	(Gls)
2000–2002	Marquense		
2002–2005	Comunicaciones	59	(6)
2006–2007	Marquense	41	(1)
2007–2008	Xelajú		
2009	Petapa	4	(1)

International career^{‡}
2000–2007	Guatemala	29	(1)
- * Club domestic league appearances and goals as of 6 March 2010 ‡ National team caps and goals as of 6 March 2010

Carlos Vinicio Quiñónez Sánchez, nicknamed El Buga, (born 20 July 1977) is a Guatemalan former professional footballer who played as a midfielder.

== Club career ==
Quiñónez played several years for Guatemalan giants Comunicaciones before returning to his first professional club Deportivo Marquense. In July 2007 he joined Xelajú and on 21 January 2008, while still at MC Xelajú, he was involved in a heavy car accident near Quetzaltenango, and was suffering from a lumbar injury, which kept him out for over six months. In January 2009 he signed for Petapa.

== International career ==
Quiñónez made his debut for Guatemala in a January 2000 friendly match against Panama and has earned a total of 29 caps, scoring 1 goal. He has represented his country in 3 FIFA World Cup qualification matches as well as at the 2005 and 2007 UNCAF Cups and the 2007 CONCACAF Gold Cup.

His final international was a November 2007 friendly match against Jamaica.

=== International goals ===
Scores and results list. Guatemala's goal tally first.

#	Date	Venue	Opponent	Score	Result	Competition
1	8 February 2007	Estadio Cuscatlán, San Salvador, El Salvador	Nicaragua	1-0	1-0	UNCAF Nations Cup 2007
