= Mario Camacho =

Costa Rican footballer (born 1983)

Personal information
- Full name: Mario Alcides Camacho Jiménez
- Date of birth: 7 August 1983 (age 43)
- Place of birth: Alajuela, Costa Rica
- Height: 1.75 m (5 ft 9 in)
- Position: Striker

Team information
- Current team: Belén FC
- Number: 23

Senior career*
Years	Team	Apps	(Gls)
2003	Municipal Osa		
2003–2005	Carmelita	14	(2)
2005	Herediano	10	(4)
2006–2007	Puntarenas	54	(9)
2008	Herediano	11	(1)
2008–2009	Puntarenas	27	(14)
2009–2010	Alajuelense	25	(2)
2011	Santos de Guápiles	29	(7)
2012	Puntarenas	1	(0)
2012–2013	Carmelita	25	(6)
2014–	Belén FC	21	(1)

International career^{‡}
2007–2009	Costa Rica	3	(0)
- * Club domestic league appearances and goals as of May 25, 2014 ‡ National team caps and goals as of October 16, 2009

Mario Alcides Camacho Jiménez (born 7 August 1983) is a Costa Rican professional footballer who played as a striker for Belén.

== Club career ==
Camacho started his professional career at Carmelita and also played for Herediano, Puntarenas, Alajuelense and Santos de Guápiles whom he joined in January 2011. He returned to second division Carmelita in summer 2012 before joining Belén FC in January 2014.

== International career ==
Camacho made his debut for Costa Rica in a June 2007 CONCACAF Gold Cup match against Haiti and has earned a total of 3 caps, scoring no goals. He has represented his country, coming on as a second-half substitute at the 2007 CONCACAF Gold Cup.

His final international was a May 2009 friendly match against Venezuela.
