= Juan Alberto Díaz =

Salvadoran footballer (born 1985)

Personal information
- Full name: Juan Alberto Díaz Rodríguez
- Date of birth: November 8, 1985 (age 40)
- Place of birth: Nejapa, San Salvador, El Salvador
- Height: 1.70 m (5 ft 7 in)
- Position: Forward

Senior career*
Years	Team	Apps	(Gls)
2003–2005	Vendaval		
2005–2007	FAS		
2007	San Salvador		
2008–2009	Nejapa		
2009	Marte Soyapango		
2009–2010	Atlético Balboa	4	(0)

International career^{‡}
2006–2007	El Salvador	10	(1)
- * Club domestic league appearances and goals as of 28 November 2009 ‡ National team caps and goals as of 9 December 2009

Juan Alberto Díaz Rodríguez (born November 8, 1985, in San Salvador, El Salvador) is a Salvadoran footballer.

== Club career ==
Díaz learned his trade at the José Luis Rugamas football school where he started playing when 8 years of age. He made his professional debut ten years later in 2003 with third division side Vendaval, then moved to giants FAS. He had a short spell at San Salvador before joining hometown club Nejapa. Another short stay at second division Marte Soyapango followed and he most recently played for Atlético Balboa.

== International career ==
He made his debut for El Salvador in a November 2006 friendly match against Bolivia and has earned a total of 9 caps, scoring 1 goal. He has represented his country at the 2007 UNCAF Nations Cup

His final international was an April 2007 friendly match against Haiti.

=== International goals ===
Scores and results list El Salvador's goal tally first.

#	Date	Venue	Opponent	Score	Result	Competition
1	8 February 2007	Estadio Cuscatlán, San Salvador, El Salvador	Belize	1–0	2–1	2007 UNCAF Nations Cup
