= Marlon Medina =

Nicaraguan footballer (born 1985)

Personal information
- Full name: Marlon José Medina García
- Date of birth: March 6, 1985 (age 41)
- Place of birth: Estelí, Nicaragua
- Position: Midfielder

Team information
- Current team: Deportivo Ocotal

Senior career*
Years	Team	Apps	(Gls)
2006–2013	Real Estelí		
2013–present	Deportivo Ocotal		

International career^{‡}
2009–	Nicaragua	12	(1)
- * Club domestic league appearances and goals ‡ National team caps and goals as of 24 January 2014

Marlon José Medina García (born 6 March 1985) is a Nicaraguan footballer who currently plays for Deportivo Ocotal in the Primera División de Nicaragua.

== Club career ==
Medina started his career at hometown club Real Estelí and joined Deportivo Ocotal in summer 2013.

== International career ==
Medina made his debut for Nicaragua in a January 2009 UNCAF Nations Cup match against El Salvador in which he came on as a late sub and immediately scored. He has, as of December 2013, earned a total of 12 caps, scoring 1 goal. He has represented his country at the 2009 and 2013 UNCAF Nations Cups as well as at the 2009 CONCACAF Gold Cup.

=== International goals ===
Scores and results list Honduras' goal tally first.

N.	Date	Venue	Opponent	Score	Result	Competition
1.	22 January 2009	Estadio Tiburcio Carias Andino, Tegucigalpa, Honduras	El Salvador	1–1	1–1	2009 UNCAF Nations Cup
