= Florencio Martínez =

Guatemalan footballer

Personal information
- Full name: Florencio Arturo Martínez Laureano
- Date of birth: October 3, 1986 (age 40)
- Place of birth: Izabal, Guatemala
- Height: 1.66 m (5 ft 5 1/2 in)
- Position: Forward

Team information
- Current team: Cobán Imperial

Senior career*
Years	Team	Apps	(Gls)
2005–2007	CD Suchitepéquez	25	(2)
2007–2008	C.S.D. Municipal	0	(0)
2007	→ Deportivo Malacateco (loan)	13	(0)
2008	CD Suchitepéquez	8	(0)
2008	→Deportivo Zacapa (loan)	4	(0)
2009	→ Antigua GFC (loan)		
2009–2010	Cobán Imperial		

International career^{‡}
2006–2007	Guatemala	5	(1)
- * Club domestic league appearances and goals as of 25 November 2006 ‡ National team caps and goals as of 25 February 2007

Florencio Martínez (born October 3, 1986) is a Guatemalan football forward. He currently plays for Cobán Imperial.

== Club career ==
At the age of 20, Martínez had shown his scoring ability in the little time given to him in Suchi. Martinez is small in size but he possesses a speed unseen in most Guatemalan footballers, which was enough to promote him to Deportivo Suchitepéquez's 1st team earlier in the Apertura 2006 season. In 2007, he was sold to Municipal as a promising prospect, but during the off-season he was loaned to newly promoted side Deportivo Malacateco, so that the youngster could get sufficient playing time, something he would not get on the stacked Municipal forward department in the upcoming 2007–2008 season.

His career did not take off and he moved to Zacapa before joining lower league side Antigua on loan in January 2009. He moved to Cobán Imperial for the 2009–2010 season.

== International career ==
Martínez scored on his debut for the Guatemala national team against Venezuela in November 2006. He has earned 5 caps, scoring 1 goal. His latest international was a February 2007 UNCAF Nations Cup match.
