= Luis Jaramillo (footballer) =

Panamanian footballer (born 1988)

Personal information
- Full name: Luis Ricauter Jaramillo
- Date of birth: 25 April 1988 (age 38)
- Place of birth: Panama City, Panama
- Height: 1.82 m (5 ft 11 1/2 in)
- Position: Defensive midfielder

Team information
- Current team: Chorrillo

Youth career
- Plaza Amador
- Chepo

Senior career*
Years	Team	Apps	(Gls)
2005–2009	Chepo	80	(27)
2009	Atlético La Sabana	20	(2)
2010–2011	Plaza Amador	25	(3)
2010	Árabe Unido	25	(3)
2011–2012	→ Victoria (loan)	33	(2)
2012	→ Vida (loan)	8	(0)
2013	Sporting San Miguelito	16	(1)
2013–2015	Chorrillo	58	(3)

International career^{‡}
- Panama U17
- Panama U20
2009–2010	Panama	4	(1)
- * Club domestic league appearances and goals as of 18 June 2007 ‡ National team caps and goals as of 10 June 2015

Luis Ricauter Jaramillo (born 25 April 1988 in Panama City, Panama) is a football midfielder who currently plays in Panama for Liga Panameña de Fútbol team Chorrillo.

== Club career ==
Jaramillo played at Panamanian clubs Chepo, Plaza Amador and Árabe Unido both sides of a stint in Colombian second division football with Atlético La Sabana, before moving to Honduras where he had spells on loan at Victoria and Vida whom he joined in summer 2012 despite problems with his player registration.

Nicknamed Popochín, he returned to Panama to join Sporting San Miguelito ahead of the 2013 Clausura before moving to Chorrillo in summer 2013.

== International career ==
Jaramillo played for Panama at the 2007 FIFA U-20 World Cup in Canada.

He made his senior debut for Panama in a January 2009 UNCAF Nations Cup match against Honduras and has earned a total of 4 caps, scoring no goals. He represented his country at the 2009 UNCAF Nations Cup in Honduras where Panama were champions.

His final international was a March 2010 friendly match against Venezuela.

== Honors ==
=== Panama ===
- UNCAF Nations Cup (1): 2009
