= Nahún Ávila =

Honduran footballer (born 1983)

Personal information
- Full name: Nahún Enrique Ávila Amaya
- Date of birth: November 29, 1983 (age 42)
- Place of birth: Choluteca, Honduras
- Height: 1.79 m (5 ft 10 in)
- Position: Defender

Team information
- Current team: Atlético Choloma
- Number: 2

Senior career*
Years	Team	Apps	(Gls)
2004–2009	Olimpia		
2010	Vida		
2010–2011	Marathón		
2011	Platense		
2012–present	Atlético Choloma		

International career^{‡}
2006	Honduras	1	(0)
- * Club domestic league appearances and goals as of 2007 ‡ National team caps and goals as of 2006

Nahún Enrique Ávila Amaya (born November 29, 1983) is a Honduran football defender currently playing for Atlético Choloma in the Liga Nacional de Honduras.

== Club career ==
Nicknamed el Zancudo, Ávila started his career at Olimpia and joined Vida for the 2010 Clausura. In summer 2010 he moved to Marathón only to sign for Platense a year later. He joined Atlético Choloma for the 2012 Clausura.

== International career ==
Ávila made his debut for Honduras as a second-half substitute for Marvin Chávez in a September 2006 friendly match against El Salvador which proved to be his only international game so far.
