= Minor López =

Guatemalan footballer (born 1987)

Personal information
- Full name: Minor Ignacio López Campollo
- Date of birth: 1 February 1987 (age 39)
- Place of birth: Quetzaltenango, Guatemala
- Height: 1.94 m (6 ft 4 in)
- Position: Forward

Youth career
- Xelajú MC

Senior career*
Years	Team	Apps	(Gls)
2008–2011	Xelajú	103	(17)
2011	Naval	30	(12)
2012	La Serena	19	(4)
2012–2013	Marquense	20	(8)
2013–2014	Comunicaciones	41	(10)
2014–2016	Atlético CP	60	(10)
2016	Atlético Venezuela	8	(2)
2017	Ñublense	10	(2)
2018	Marquense	15	(2)
2018–2021	Mixco	18	(5)
2021-2022	Comunicaciones B	0	(0)

International career
2006–2007	Guatemala U20	5	(2)
2008	Guatemala Olympic	3	(1)
2010–2015	Guatemala	44	(7)
- * Club domestic league appearances and goals as of 21:50, 19 April 2020 (UTC)

Minor Ignacio López Campollo (born 1 February 1987) is a retired Guatemalan footballer. He was also a member of the Guatemala national team, playing in the 2010 and 2014 World Cup qualifying campaigns.

== Club career ==
A tall forward, López was born in Quetzaltenango, and began his professional career in 2007 at local club Xelajú MC, where he scored 14 goals in three seasons. In January 2011 he was acquired by Deportes Naval for that year's season. He made his debut in Chile on 12 March 2011, scoring to give the team a 1-1 draw against Puerto Montt. As the club attempted to earn promotion to the top division, López contributed with 12 goals scored during the 2011 season, including one during the promotion/relegation playoff which Naval lost to Santiago Wanderers.

In January 2012, he was signed by Deportes La Serena of the Chilean 1st division.

In 2014, López was signed to Atlético Clube de Portugal.

== International career ==
In 2006, López was a member of the Guatemala U-20 national team that won the UNCAF U-20 Championship and consequently participated at the U-20 World Cup qualifying tournament the following year. Months later, he played with the U-23 team in the 2008 Olympic Games qualifying campaign, where on 14 March 2008 he scored his team's second goal in a come-from-behind 2-1 win against Mexico which allowed Guatemala to advance to the next round on top of its group and fight for a berth in the final Olympic Tournament against Honduras, whom it lost to on penalty kicks.

His senior international debut occurred on 19 November 2008 under coach "Mincho" Monterroso, playing the last 15 minutes of a 0-2 loss against the United States during 2010 World Cup qualifying. In 2009, he played at the UNCAF Nations Cup, where he scored his first senior international goal against Costa Rica. He has since played regularly with the national team, being rotated in attack with the more experienced strikers Carlos Ruiz and Dwight Pezzarossi during 2014 World Cup qualification, and scoring two goals in the second round.

== Career statistics ==
Club	Season	League		Domestic Cup		International		Total	
Club	Season	Apps	Goals	Apps	Goals	Apps	Goals	Apps	Goals
Naval	2011	30	12	4	1	—	—	34	13
Naval	Total	30	12	4	1	—	—	34	13
La Serena	2012	19	4	2	—	—	—	21	4
La Serena	Total	19	4	2	—	—	—	21	4
Marquense	2012—13	20	8	—	—	—	—	20	8
Marquense	Total	20	8	—	—	—	—	20	8
Comunicaciones	2013—14	40	10	—	—	4	1	44	11
Comunicaciones	2014—15	1	—	—	—	—	—	1	—
Comunicaciones	Total	41	10	—	—	4	1	45	11
Atlético CP	2014—15	25	6	2	—	—	—	27	6
Atlético CP	2015—16	35	4	1	—	—	—	36	4
Atlético CP	Total	60	10	3	—	—	—	63	10
Career total		170	44	9	1	4	1	183	46

=== International goals ===
Scores and results list Guatemala's goal tally first.

#	Date	Venue	Opponent	Score	Result	Competition
1.	25 January 2009	Estadio Tiburcio Carías Andino, Tegucigalpa	Costa Rica	1–1	1–3	2009 UNCAF Nations Cup
2.	6 September 2011	FFB Field, Belmopan	Belize	2–0	2–1	2014 World Cup qualification
3.	11 October 2011	Estadio Mateo Flores, Guatemala, Guatemala	Belize	2–1	3–1	2014 World Cup qualification
4.	1 March 2012	Providence Stadium, Providence	Guyana	1–0	2–0	Friendly
5.	15 November 2012	Estadio Feliciano Cáceres, Luque	Paraguay	1–2	1–3	Friendly
6.	25 January 2013	Estadio Nacional, San José	Panama	1–3	1–3	2013 Copa Centroamericana
7.	17 November 2015	Arnos Vale Stadium, Kingstown	Saint Vincent and the Grenadines	2–0	4–0	2018 FIFA World Cup qualification

== Honours ==
- Xelajú 2007 (Clausura Championship)
