= Edwin González (Salvadoran footballer) =

Salvadoran footballer (born 1977)

Personal information
- Full name: Edwin Alexander González Valenzuela
- Date of birth: June 20, 1977 (age 49)
- Place of birth: San Miguel, El Salvador
- Height: 1.65 m (5 ft 5 in)
- Position: Sweeper

Team information
- Current team: Municipal Limeño

Youth career
- 1996–1997: Luis Ángel Firpo

Senior career*
Years	Team	Apps	(Gls)
1998–2004	Municipal Limeño		
2004–2005	Águila		
2005–2006	Alianza		
2006–2009	Luis Ángel Firpo		
2010–present	Municipal Limeño		

International career^{‡}
2000–2004	El Salvador	4	(1)
- * Club domestic league appearances and goals as of 15 May 2011 ‡ National team caps and goals as of 15 May 2011

Edwin Alexander González Valenzuela (born June 20, 1977) is a Salvadoran football (soccer) player, who plays defender for Municipal Limeño in the Salvadoran second division.

== Club career ==
A rather short defender, González started his career at Luis Ángel Firpo before joining Municipal Limeño in 1998. After six years, he moved on to Águila together with his Municipal teammates Josué Galdámez and Deris Umanzor but he left them for Alianza a year later. He returned to Firpo in 2006 and to Municipal Limeño in January 2010, where he signed for two years.

González played for Luis Ángel Firpo in the 2008–09 CONCACAF Champions League Group Stage.

== International career ==
Nicknamed Pelón, González made his debut for El Salvador in a March 2000 FIFA World Cup qualification against Belize and has earned a total of 4 caps, scoring 1 goal. He has represented his country in 2 FIFA World Cup qualification matches.

His final international game was his second FIFA World Cup qualification match against the United States in September 2004.

=== International goals ===
Scores and results list El Salvador's goal tally first.

#	Date	Venue	Opponent	Score	Result	Competition
1	28 March 2000	Estadio Flor Blanca, San Salvador, El Salvador	Haiti	2-0	3-1	Friendly match
