= Lennox Castillo =

Belizean football player (born 1985)

Personal information
- Date of birth: 19 November 1985 (age 40)
- Place of birth: Belize
- Position: Striker

Team information
- Current team: Police United (Belize)

Senior career*
Years	Team	Apps	(Gls)
–2005	Griga United		
2005–2006	New Site Erei		
2007	Árabe Unido		
2011–	Police United (Belize)		

International career
2007–2013	Belize	3	(0)
- * Club domestic league appearances and goals

Lennox Castillo (born 19 November 1985) is a Belizean footballer who plays as a striker for Police United (Belize). Besides Belize, he has played in Panama.

== Career ==
He is nicknamed Criminal.

He played for Belize under-21 national team.

He is a Belize international.

In 2006, he was top scorer of the Belize league with New Site Erei.

In 2007, Castillo signed for Panamanian side Árabe Unido.
