= Ricardo Gutiérrez =

Mexican footballer (born 1997)

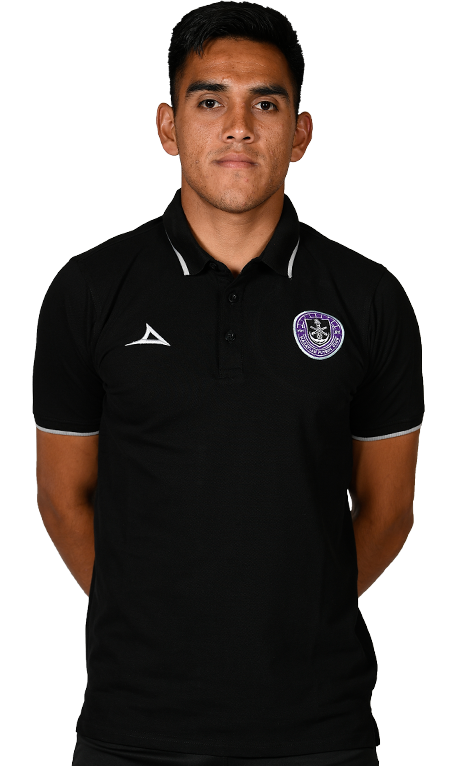
- Gutiérrez with Mazatlán in 2020

Personal information
- Full name: Ricardo Daniel Gutiérrez Hernández
- Date of birth: 17 June 1997 (age 29)
- Place of birth: Tangamandapio, Michoacán, Mexico
- Height: 1.81 m (5 ft 11 in)
- Position: Goalkeeper

Team information
- Current team: Puebla
- Number: 28

Youth career
- 2017–2020: Monarcas Morelia

Senior career*
| Years | Team | Apps | (Gls) |
| 2019–2020 | Morelia | 0 | (0) |
| 2020–2025 | Mazatlán | 43 | (0) |
| 2026– | Puebla | 34 | (0) |
- * Club domestic league appearances and goals as of 20 November 2026

Ricardo Daniel Gutiérrez Hernández (born 17 June 1997) is a Mexican professional footballer who plays as a goalkeeper for Liga MX club Puebla.

== Career statistics ==
As of match played on 20 November 2026

| Club | Season | League | | | Cup | | Continental | | Other | | Total | |
| Club | Season | Division | Apps | Goals | Apps | Goals | Apps | Goals | Apps | Goals | Apps | Goals |
|---|---|---|---|---|---|---|---|---|---|---|---|---|
| Morelia | 2018–19 | Liga MX | — | | 2 | 0 | — | | — | | 2 | 0 |
| Mazatlán | 2020–21 | Liga MX | 6 | 0 | 1 (Note: Appearances in Copa Sky por México) | 0 | — | | — | | 7 | 0 |
| Mazatlán | 2022–23 | Liga MX | 13 | 0 | 3 (Note: Appearances in Copa Sky por México) | 0 | — | | — | | 16 | 0 |
| Mazatlán | 2023–24 | Liga MX | 6 | 0 | — | | — | | 3 (Note: Appearances in Leagues Cup) | 0 | 9 | 0 |
| Mazatlán | 2024–25 | Liga MX | 1 | 0 | — | | — | | 4 | 0 | 1 | 0 |
| Mazatlán | 2025–26 | Liga MX | 17 | 0 | — | | — | | 1 | 0 | 17 | 0 |
| Mazatlán | Total | | 43 | 0 | 4 | 0 | — | | 8 | 0 | 55 | 0 |
| Puebla | 2025–26 | Liga MX | 17 | 0 | — | | — | | — | | 17 | 0 |
| Puebla | 2026–27 | Liga MX | 17 | 0 | — | | — | | 1 | 0 | 18 | 0 |
| Puebla | Total | | 34 | 0 | — | | — | | 1 | 0 | 35 | 0 |
| Career total | | | 66 | 0 | 6 | 0 | 0 | 0 | 9 | 0 | 76 | 0 |
