= Roberto Wong =

Costa Rican footballer (born 1979)

Personal information
- Full name: Roberto Wong Ordeñana
- Date of birth: 17 August 1979 (age 47)
- Place of birth: Puntarenas, Costa Rica
- Height: 1.79 m (5 ft 10 in)
- Position: Defender

Team information
- Current team: Puntarenas (manager)

Senior career*
Years	Team	Apps	(Gls)
2000–2001	Herediano	2	(0)
2001–2003	Santos de Guápiles	38	(4)
2004–2008	Puntarenas	125	(13)
2009–2010	Liberia Mía	25	(1)
2010	Barrio México	9	(1)
2011	→ Saprissa (loan)	9	(0)
2011–2012	Pérez Zeledón	29	(2)
2012–2019	Puntarenas	69	(9)

International career
2007	Costa Rica	2	(0)

Managerial career
- 2022–2023: Costa Rica U17 (assistant)
- 2023: Costa Rica U15
- 2023–2024: Puntarenas (sporting director)
- 2023: Puntarenas (caretaker)
- 2024–: Puntarenas
- * Club domestic league appearances and goals

Roberto Wong Ordeñana (born August 17, 1979) is a Costa Rican football manager and former player who is the manager of Puntarenas.

His last name in Chinese is 黄, which means "yellow", and his ancestor was from Zhanjiang, Guangdong, China.

== Club career ==
Wong started his career at Herediano and played for Santos de Guápiles before starting a lengthy stint at hometown club Puntarenas. He moved to Liberia Mía in 2009 and had a spell at ambitious club Barrio México before joining Saprissa from them on loan. In May 2011 he was deemed surplus to requirements by the club so he signed for a year with Pérez Zeledón, but returned to Puntarenas in 2012.

== International career ==
Wong made his senior debut for Costa Rica in a February 2007 UNCAF Nations Cup match against Panama and earned his second and final cap in an October 2007 friendly against Haiti.
