= 2009 UNCAF Nations Cup =

Copa Naciones de UNCAF Copa Naciones DIGICEL

Tournament details
- Host country: Honduras
- Dates: January 22 - February 1
- Teams: 7 (from 1 sub-confederation)
- Venue: 1 (in 1 host city)

Final positions
- Champions: Panama (1st title)
- Runners-up: Costa Rica
- Third place: Honduras
- Fourth place: El Salvador

Tournament statistics
- Matches played: 14
- Goals scored: 32 (2.29 per match)
- Attendance: 114,000 (8,143 per match)
- Top scorer(s): (Costa Rica) Andy Furtado (3 goals)
- Best player: (Costa Rica) Keylor Navas

The UNCAF Nations Cup 2009 was the tenth edition of the UNCAF Nations Cup, the biennial football (soccer) tournament for the CONCACAF-affiliated national teams of Central America. The first five places qualified for the 2009 CONCACAF Gold Cup. The event was going to take place in Panama City, Panama between January 22 and February 1, 2009, but the Panamanian FA announced that they would not host the event due to not having an adequate stadium available for the time period of the tournament. The alternative hosts were Honduras and Guatemala. Honduras submitted an official replacement bid on November 12, and after some consideration it was moved to Honduras. All games were played in Estadio Tiburcio Carías Andino in Tegucigalpa. The tournament was sponsored by Digicel. On 1 February 2009 Panama won the tournament, the first UNCAF Nations Cup win in the country's history.

== Participating nations ==
All seven UNCAF members participated in the tournament:

- Belize
- Costa Rica (Defending Champions)
- El Salvador
- Guatemala
- Honduras (Hosts)
- Nicaragua
- Panama

== Stadium ==
2009 UNCAF Nations Cup is located in Honduras	Tegucigalpa
2009 UNCAF Nations Cup is located in Honduras	Estadio Tiburcio Carías Andino
2009 UNCAF Nations Cup is located in Honduras	Capacity: 35,000

== First round ==
The group stage draw took place on December 9, 2008 in Guatemala City. The reigning champions, Costa Rica, and the hosts, Honduras, were automatically drawn as top seed in their respective groups. Costa Rica was paired with Panama and Guatemala, the first two runners-up from the 2007 UNCAF Nations Cup. The remaining teams – El Salvador, Nicaragua, and Belize – were drawn into the same group as Honduras.

=== Group A ===
Pos	Team	Pld	W	D	L	GF	GA	GD	Pts	Qualification
1	Honduras	3	3	0	0	8	2	+6	9	Qualified to the Semifinals
2	El Salvador	3	1	1	1	5	4	+1	4	Qualified to the Semifinals
3	Nicaragua	3	0	2	1	3	6	−3	2	Qualified to the Fifth place playoff
4	Belize	3	0	1	2	3	7	−4	1	

22 January 2009
17:00 (UTC−06)

El Salvador	1–1	Nicaragua
Avilés 18' (o.g.)	Report	Medina 85'

Estadio Tiburcio Carías Andino, Tegucigalpa
Attendance: 1,200
Referee: Carlos Batres (GUA)
22 January 2009
19:30 (UTC−06)

Honduras	2–1	Belize
Guevara 32'; Martínez 61'	Report	Castillo 86'

Estadio Tiburcio Carías Andino, Tegucigalpa
Attendance: 20,000
Referee: Roberto Moreno (PAN)

24 January 2009
15:00 (UTC−06)

Belize	1–4	El Salvador
James 73'	Report	Pacheco 11' (pen.), 30' (pen.); Sánchez 75'; Ayala 88'

Estadio Tiburcio Carías Andino, Tegucigalpa
Attendance: 900
Referee: Wálter Quesada (CRC)
24 January 2009
17:30 (UTC−06)

Honduras	4–1	Nicaragua
Rodríguez 16'; Solórzano 65' (o.g.); S. Martínez 73'; W. Martínez 79'	Report	Reyes 30'

Estadio Tiburcio Carías Andino, Tegucigalpa
Attendance: 20,000
Referee: Carlos Batres (GUA)

26 January 2009
17:00 (UTC−06)

Nicaragua	1–1	Belize
Barrera 66'	Report	Usher 27'

Estadio Tiburcio Carías Andino, Tegucigalpa
Attendance: 8,000
Referee: Óscar Moncada (HON)
26 January 2009
19:30 (UTC−06)

Honduras	2–0	El Salvador
Pavón 34' (pen.); Chávez 73'	Report

Estadio Tiburcio Carías Andino, Tegucigalpa
Attendance: 29,600
Referee: Wálter Quesada (CRC)

=== Group B ===
Pos	Team	Pld	W	D	L	GF	GA	GD	Pts	Qualification
1	Costa Rica	2	2	0	0	6	1	+5	6	Qualified to the Semifinals
2	Panama	2	1	0	1	1	3	−2	3	Qualified to the Semifinals
3	Guatemala	2	0	0	2	1	4	−3	0	Qualified to the Fifth place playoff

23 January 2009
19:30 (UTC−06)

Costa Rica	3–0	Panama
Furtado 10', 16'; Sánchez 55'	Report

Estadio Tiburcio Carías Andino, Tegucigalpa
Attendance: 2,000
Referee: Courtney Campbell (JAM)

25 January 2009
18:00 (UTC−06)

Guatemala	1–3	Costa Rica
López 51'	Report	Sánchez 34'; Herrera 59'; Segura 61'

Estadio Tiburcio Carías Andino, Tegucigalpa
Attendance: 3,000
Referee: Marco Rodríguez (MEX)

27 January 2009
19:30 (UTC−06)

Panama	1–0	Guatemala
Zapata 31'	Report

Estadio Tiburcio Carías Andino, Tegucigalpa
Attendance: 1,000
Referee: Joel Aguilar (SLV)

== Final round ==
=== Fifth place ===
The winner of the fifth place match qualified for the 2009 CONCACAF Gold Cup as the fifth and final entrant from Central America.

29 January 2009
19:30 (UTC−06)

Nicaragua	2–0	Guatemala
Wilson 39', 85'	Report

Estadio Tiburcio Carías Andino, Tegucigalpa
Attendance: 150
Referee: Óscar Moncada (HON)

=== Semifinals ===
All four semifinalists qualified for the 2009 CONCACAF Gold Cup.

30 January 2009
17:00 (UTC−06)
Semifinal

Costa Rica	3–0 Awarded	El Salvador
Furtado 18'	Report

Estadio Tiburcio Carías Andino, Tegucigalpa, Honduras
Attendance: 2,500
Referee: Roberto Moreno (PAN)
- The game was called after sixty minutes of play when El Salvador was reduced to six players. Two El Salvador players, Alexander Escobar and Eliseo Quintanilla, were awarded red cards in the first half, and Deris Umanzor, Rodolfo Zelaya, and goalkeeper Juan José Gómez were injured and had to leave the game after El Salvador had already exhausted their three substitutions. The game was awarded 3–0 to Costa Rica
30 January 2009
20:00 (UTC−06)
Semifinal

Honduras	0–1	Panama
	Report	Phillips 40'

Estadio Tiburcio Carías Andino, Tegucigalpa, Honduras
Attendance: 20,000
Referee: Carlos Batres (GUA)

=== Third place ===
1 February 2009
15:30 (UTC−06)

Honduras	1–0	El Salvador
Espinoza 30'	Report

Estadio Tiburcio Carías Andino, Tegucigalpa
Attendance: 900
Referee: Wálter Quesada (CRC)

=== Final ===
1 February 2009
18:00 (UTC−06)
Final

Panama	0–0	Costa Rica
	Report
Penalties
Herrera (penalty scored); Aguilar (penalty scored); Phillips (penalty scored); Jaramillo (penalty scored); Henríquez (penalty scored)	5–3	(penalty scored) Furtado; (penalty scored) Núñez; (penalty missed) Jiménez; (penalty scored) Oviedo

Estadio Tiburcio Carías Andino, Tegucigalpa
Attendance: 900
Referee: Carlos Batres (GUA)

Panama	Costa Rica

PANAMA:
GK	1	Jaime Penedo
DF	2	Carlos Rivera
DF	4	José Torres (C)
DF	6	Amílcar Henríquez
DF	13	Adolfo Machado
DF	14	Armando Gun
MF	5	Manuel Torres	(yellow card) 81'
MF	10	Nelson Barahona		(substituted off) 81'
MF	15	Ricardo Phillips
FW	8	Gabriel Torres	(yellow card) 63'	(substituted off) 69'
FW	9	Orlando Rodríguez		(substituted off) 62'
Substitutions:
FW	7	Edwin Aguilar		(substituted on) 62'
MF	11	Víctor Herrera		(substituted on) 69'
MF	20	Luis Jaramillo		(substituted on) 81'
Manager:
(England) Gary Stempel

COSTA RICA:
GK	23	Ricardo González
DF	3	Freddy Fernández (C)
DF	4	Michael Umaña
DF	12	Leonardo González	(yellow card) 37'
DF	17	Pablo Herrera		(substituted off) 72'
DF	19	Carlos Johnson
MF	5	Cristian Oviedo	(yellow card) 75'
MF	15	Jorge Davis
MF	22	Álvaro Sánchez		(substituted off) 46'
FW	7	Alejandro Alpízar	(yellow card) 6'
FW	11	Andy Furtado
Substitutions:
FW	21	Víctor Núñez		(substituted on) 46'
MF	16	Pablo Brenes		(substituted on) 58'
MF	14	Paolo Jiménez		(substituted on) 72'
Manager:
(Costa Rica) Rodrigo Kenton

== Results ==
2009 UNCAF
Nations Cup champions

Panama
First title

Pos	Team	Pld	W	D	L	GF	GA	GD	Pts	Final status
1	Panama	4	2	1	1	2	3	−1	7	Champions
2	Costa Rica	4	3	1	0	9	1	+8	10	Runner-up
3	Honduras	5	4	0	1	9	3	+6	12	Third place winner
4	El Salvador	5	1	1	3	5	8	−3	4	Third place loser
5	Nicaragua	4	1	2	1	5	6	−1	5	Fifth place winner
6	Guatemala	3	0	0	3	1	6	−5	0	Fifth place loser
7	Belize	3	0	1	2	3	7	−4	1	Eliminated in Group stage

- Top 5 qualified to the 2009 CONCACAF Gold Cup.

== Scorers ==
3 goals

- (Costa Rica) Andy Furtado

2 goals

- (El Salvador) Alfredo Pacheco
- (Nicaragua) Samuel Wilson
- (Honduras) Walter Martínez

1 goal

- (Panama) Alberto Zapata
- (Panama) Ricardo Phillips
- (Belize) Lisbey Castillo
- (Belize) Jerome James
- (Belize) Harrison Róchez
- (Costa Rica) William Sunsing
- (Costa Rica) Roberto Segura
- (Costa Rica) Álvaro Sánchez
- (Costa Rica) Pablo Herrera
- (Nicaragua) Marlon Medina
- (Nicaragua) Armando Reyes
- (Nicaragua) Juan Barrera
- (Honduras) Marvin Chávez
- (Honduras) Mario Rodríguez
- (Honduras) Saúl Martínez
- (Honduras) Carlos Pavón
- (Honduras) Emil Martínez
- (Honduras) Amado Guevara
- (Honduras) Roger Espinoza
- (Guatemala) Minor López
- (El Salvador) Ramón Sánchez
- (El Salvador) Carlos Ayala

1 goal (Own Goal)

- (Nicaragua) Silvio Avilés (for El Salvador)
- (Nicaragua) David Solorzano (for Honduras)

== See also ==
- UNCAF Nations Cup
- 2009 CONCACAF Gold Cup
- Central American Football Union
