= Armando Gun =

Panamanian footballer (born 1986)

Personal information
- Full name: Armando Antonio Gun Caballero
- Date of birth: 17 January 1986 (age 40)
- Place of birth: Panama City, Panama
- Height: 1.76 m (5 ft 9 1/2 in)
- Position: Left-back

Team information
- Current team: Independiente La Chorrera

Senior career*
Years	Team	Apps	(Gls)
2002	Municipal Chorrillo	10	(0)
2003	San Francisco	22	(3)
2004	Municipal Chorrillo	27	(4)
2003	San Francisco	15	(2)
2006	América Cali	11	(0)
2006	Alajuelense	5	(0)
2007–2012	Chepo	57	(6)
2010	Plaza Amador	14	(3)
2012	Sporting San Miguelito	13	(0)
2013	Río Abajo	14	(1)
2013–2014	Chepo	6	(0)
2015–	Independiente La Chorrera	4	(0)

International career^{‡}
2005–2009	Panama	19	(0)
- * Club domestic league appearances and goals as of 4 July 2007 ‡ National team caps and goals as of 10 June 2015

Armando Antonio Gun Caballero (born 17 January 1986) is a Panamanian professional footballer who currently plays for Independiente La Chorrera as a left-back.

== Club career ==
Gun played for several Panamanian league clubs and had spells abroad with Colombian side América de Cali and Costa Rican outfit Alajuelense, whom he left after the 2006 Apertura season.

In January 2013, Gun moved to Río Abajo then returned to Chepo in summer 2013 but left for Independiente La Chorrera in December 2014.

== International career ==
Gun was one of the only members of the Panama U-20 squad who have participated at both the 2003 FIFA World Youth Championship in the United Arab Emirates and the 2005 FIFA World Youth Championship in the Netherlands.

He made his senior debut for the Panama national football team in a January 2005 friendly match against Ecuador and has earned a total of 19 caps, scoring no goals. He represented his country in one FIFA World Cup qualification match and played at the 2005 and 2009 UNCAF Nations Cups as well as at the 2009 CONCACAF Gold Cup.

His final international match was a 2009 CONCACAF Gold Cup match against the United States.
