= Kurt Bernard =

Costa Rican footballer (born 1977)

Personal information
- Full name: Kurt Bernard Simpson
- Date of birth: December 8, 1977 (age 48)
- Place of birth: Limón, Costa Rica
- Height: 1.85 m (6 ft 1 in)
- Position: Forward

Senior career*
Years	Team	Apps	(Gls)
1998–2001	Limonense		(37)
2001–2002	Santos de Guápiles	29	(8)
2002–2005	Herediano	27	(10)
2005–2009	Puntarenas	85	(40)
2009–2015	Limón	69	(22)

International career
2006–2007	Costa Rica	10	(1)
- * Club domestic league appearances and goals

Kurt Bernard Simpson (born December 8, 1977) is a Costa Rican former professional footballer who played as a forward. He was the top scorer in the Costa Rican league in the 2005–06 season.

== Club career ==
He started his career with hometown club Limonense and later played for Santos de Guápiles, Herediano, Puntarenas, before rejoining his first club, the renamed Limón.

He is the only player who is the all-time club top goalscorer of two different teams in Costa Rica, scoring 40 for Puntarenas and 57 for Limon as of September 2013. By November 2013, he had scored 117 goals in the Costa Rican Premier Division.

== International career ==
Bernard made his debut for Costa Rica in a February 2006 friendly match against South Korea and has earned a total of 10 caps, scoring 1 goal. He has represented his country at the 2006 FIFA World Cup and played at the 2007 UNCAF Nations Cup.

His final international was a February 2007 UNCAF Nations Cup match against Panama.

=== International goals ===
Scores and results list Costa Rica's goal tally first.

N.	Date	Venue	Opponent	Score	Result	Competition
1.	18 February 2007	Estadio Cuscatlán, San Salvador, El Salvador	Panama	1–1	1–1	2007 UNCAF Nations Cup
