= Dinei Florencio =

American electrical engineer

Dinei Florencio is an electrical engineer with Microsoft Research in Redmond, Washington. He was named a Fellow of the Institute of Electrical and Electronics Engineers (IEEE) in 2016 for his contributions to statistical and signal processing approaches to adversarial and security problems.
