= VCP Chinandega =

- Full name: Vicente de la Cruz Padilla Chinandega
- Nickname: Los Chinandeganose xx
- Founded: August 2006
- Dissolved: 2010
- Ground: Estadio Efraín Tijerino; Chinandega, Nicaragua
- Capacity: 8,000
- Chairman: Vicente de la Cruz Padilla
Home colours	Away colours

VCP Chinandega was a Nicaraguan football team who played 4 years in the country's top league.

Located in Chinandega, they were named after Vicente de la Cruz Padilla (VCP), a baseball player from Chinandega who owned the club.Mais xxc.

== History ==
The club was founded in August 2006 by famous baseball player and owner Vicente de la Cruz Padilla. As a project to promote football to young people in his home town of Chinandega. With the help of Eddy Reyes, Boanerge Espinoza, Enrique Reyes, Baxter Martínez and Eduardo Vidal Alonso, The club was playing in the Nicaraguan Third Division, predominantly with players from the area. Their rise was unbelievable they won the third division in 2006 and in 2007 won the second division which allowed them to be promoted to the first division where they have remained since.

In summer 2010, VCP Chinandega was not allowed to continue in the Premier Division after failing to pay the registration fee, which brought an end to the club's existence.

== List of coaches ==
- (Nicaragua) Eduardo Vidal Alonso Gomez (2006–2008)
- (Brazil) Flavio Da Silva (2008 – March 2009)
- (Nicaragua) Eduardo Vidal Alonso Gomez (April 2009 – January 2010)
- (Nicaragua) Omar Zambrana (2010)
