= Léster Ruiz =

Guatemalan footballer

Léster Ruíz
Personal information
- Full name: Gregory Léster Ruíz David
- Date of birth: March 8, 1981 (age 45)
- Place of birth: Livingston, Guatemala
- Height: 1.72 m (5 ft 8 in)
- Position: Midfielder

Senior career*
Years	Team	Apps	(Gls)
2004–2006	Heredia		
2006–2008	Marquense		
2008–2009	Xinabajul	25	(1)
2009–2010	Jalapa	21	(6)
2010–2011	Xelajú MC		
2011–2012	Municipal	23	(4)
2012–2013	Suchitepéquez	8	(2)
2013–2014	Halcones	38	(11)
2014	Coatepeque	5	(0)
2015	Halcones	1	(0)

International career
2007–2014	Guatemala	13	(2)
- * Club domestic league appearances and goals

Gregory Léster Ruíz David (born March 8, 1981) is a Guatemalan professional footballer who plays as a midfielder. He was on the provisional roster for the Central American Cup Tigo 2014 USA. He is the nephew of Deborah Lastenia David, star of the late Celia Cruz video "La negra que tiene tumbao" , hence his nickname "El Tumbao".
