= Alfredo Pacheco =

Salvadoran footballer (1982-2015)

Personal information
- Full name: Alfredo Alberto Pacheco
- Date of birth: 1 December 1982
- Place of birth: Santa Ana, El Salvador
- Date of death: 27 December 2015 (aged 33)
- Place of death: Santa Ana, El Salvador
- Height: 1.78 m (5 ft 10 in)
- Position: Left back

Youth career
- 1996–1999: FAS

Senior career*
Years	Team	Apps	(Gls)
2000–2010	FAS	239	(31)
2009	→ New York Red Bulls (loan)	14	(0)
2010–2011	Águila	25	(3)
2011–2013	Isidro Metapán	78	(15)
Total		356	(49)

International career
2000–2002	El Salvador U20	14	(2)
2002	El Salvador U21	5	(2)
2003	El Salvador U23	6	(2)
2002–2013	El Salvador	86	(7)
Medal record
Representing El Salvador
Men's Football
Central American and Caribbean Games
Gold medal – first place	2002 El Salvador	Team competition
- * Club domestic league appearances and goals

Alfredo Alberto Pacheco (1 December 1982 – 27 December 2015), nicknamed "El Chele", was a Salvadoran footballer who had the record for most appearances on the El Salvador national football team when he was banned for life in 2013, for match-fixing while playing for the national team. He was murdered in Santa Ana on 27 December 2015.

== Career ==
=== Club ===
Pacheco spent the majority of his career with one of El Salvador's biggest clubs, FAS. After moving through the junior ranks and into the first team reserves, he was given his first chance to play in the Salvadoran Primera División in 2001. He made his professional debut on 3 March 2001, in a league match against C.D. Municipal Limeño. In 2005, he was named club captain.

On 18 February 2009, it was announced that New York Red Bulls head coach Juan Carlos Osorio had gone to El Salvador with the hopes of bringing Pacheco to Major League Soccer. Pacheco had been scouted for several months, most notably during FIFA World Cup qualification matches, as well as during the UNCAF Nations Cup tournament. It was initially announced that Pacheco signed with New York Red Bulls on 5 March 2009, but due to difficulties surrounding his International Transfer Card, the New York front office did not officially announce his signing until 17 April 2009. In the meantime Pacheco started training with the Red Bulls on 7 April 2009 and after his official signing, made his first appearance on 18 April 2009. After a bright start, Pacheco struggled on the field for New York, and the team terminated his loan deal before the end of the season. Pacheco signed a two-year contract with C.D. Águila on 30 June 2010. However, he left the club just one year into his contract with Águila to join Isidro Metápan starting with 2011/12 season.

=== International ===
Pacheco began his international career with El Salvador's U-20 national team in 2000. He took part in the 2003 CONCACAF U-20 Tournament, which was held throughout 2002. El Salvador failed to qualify for the FIFA World Youth Championship that was to be held in the United Arab Emirates.

That same year Pacheco was also part of the El Salvador U-23 team that won the Central American and Caribbean Games gold medal, after defeating Mexico in the final.

Again, that same year, Pacheco received his first cap with the men's national team. This was on 17 November 2002, in a friendly match against the United States. Pacheco scored his first goal for El Salvador, off a free-kick vs Costa Rica in a 2003 Gold Cup Quarterfinals match. Pacheco was then the top most capped player of all-time for El Salvador with 86 caps.

On 20 September 2013, Pacheco was one of 14 Salvadoran players banned for life over match fixing.

== Personal life ==
Pacheco lived with his wife Elizabeth de Pacheco, their daughter Alexia Pacheco and son Marco Pacheco.

=== Death ===
On 27 December 2015 at 3:51 a.m., Pacheco was shot and killed at a gas station in Santa Ana. Several shots were fired range and two other people were also injured. It was later reported Pacheco was shot from point blank range and killed by a shot in the abdomen. On 5 March 2024, the First Sentencing Court of Santa Ana sentenced Samuel Toledo and Ana Marta Guadalupe Bolaños de Méndez to 63 years imprisonment for three murders they committed, Pacheco's being among them.
