= Freddy Fernández (footballer) =

Costa Rican footballer (born 1974)

Personal information
- Full name: José Freddy Fernández Beita
- Date of birth: February 25, 1974 (age 52)
- Place of birth: , Costa Rica
- Height: 1.82 m (6 ft 0 in)
- Position: Defender

Youth career
- Deportivo Saprissa

Senior career*
| Years | Team | Apps | (Gls) |
| 1994–2009 | Pérez Zeledón | 212 | (20) |
| 2009 | Águilas Guanacastecas | 10 | (0) |
| 2010 | Santos de Guápiles | 10 | (0) |

International career
| 2007–2009 | Costa Rica | 25 | (1) |
- * Club domestic league appearances and goals

José Freddy Fernández Beita (born February 25, 1974) is a Costa Rican footballer who played as defender.

== Club career ==
Born in Pérez Zeledón, Fernández began playing club football with Municipal Pérez Zeledón at 20 years of age. After spending most of his career with his hometown club, he joined Águilas Guanacastecas in May 2009 but left them after a brief spell and finished his career with Santos de Guápiles.

== International career ==
Fernández made several appearances for the Costa Rica national football team, captaining the side during the 2010 FIFA World Cup qualification rounds. He made his international debut in the 2007 UNCAF Nations Cup. Fernández also participated in the 2007 and 2009 CONCACAF Gold Cup finals.

His final international was an August 2009 FIFA World Cup qualification match against Honduras.

== Honours ==
- CONCACAF Gold Cup All-Tournament Team: 2009

== Personal ==
His parents are Aricelda Beita and Ezequías Fernández.

Fernández is the brother of former Costa Rica international footballer, Pastor Fernández.
