= Claudio Albizuris =

Guatemalan footballer

Personal information
- Full name: Claudio Josué Albizuris Aguilár
- Date of birth: July 1, 1981 (age 45)
- Place of birth: Guatemala City, Guatemala
- Height: 1.76 m (5 ft 9 in)
- Position: Defensive midfielder

Youth career
- Municipal

Senior career*
Years	Team	Apps	(Gls)
2000–2010	Municipal	86	(0)
2010–2011	USAC	29	(2)
2011–2017	Municipal	321	(12)

International career^{‡}
2001–2012	Guatemala	35	(1)
- * Club domestic league appearances and goals as of 20 February 2007 ‡ National team caps and goals as of 13 November 2006

Claudio Josué Albizuris Aguilár (born 1 July 1981) is a Guatemalan former football midfielder who last played for local club Municipal in the Guatemalan top division.

== Club career ==
Albizuris played all of his career at Municipal, after coming through the club's youth ranks to become professional in 2000, only to leave them in June 2010 to join fellow capital side USAC. and come back to Municipal a year after in 2011.

== International career ==
Albizuris made his debut for Guatemala in a June 2001 UNCAF Nations Cup match against Costa Rica and has, by January 2010, earned a total of 34 caps, scoring 1 goal. He represented Guatemala in just 1 FIFA World Cup qualification match and during the 2002 CONCACAF Gold Cup and the 2007 CONCACAF Gold Cup campaign.

=== International goals ===
Scores and results list Guatemala's goal tally first.

#	Date	Venue	Opponent	Score	Result	Competition
1	18 February 2007	Estadio Cuscatlán, San Salvador, El Salvador	El Salvador	1-0	1-0	UNCAF Nations Cup 2007
