= 2007 UNCAF Nations Cup =

Tournament details
- Host country: El Salvador
- Dates: 8–18 February
- Teams: 7 (from 1 sub-confederation)
- Venue(s): 1 (in 1 host city)

Final positions
- Champions: Costa Rica (6th title)
- Runners-up: Panama
- Third place: Guatemala
- Fourth place: El Salvador

Tournament statistics
- Matches played: 14
- Goals scored: 39 (2.79 per match)
- Top scorer(s): (Honduras) Wilmer Velásquez (4 goals)

The 2007 UNCAF Nations Cup was the ninth version of the biennial football tournament for the CONCACAF national teams of Central America. The event took place in San Salvador, El Salvador from February 8 to February 18, 2007. It was the second time El Salvador hosted the competition. The tournament also served as a qualifying process for the 2007 CONCACAF Gold Cup.

Costa Rica won the tournament on penalty kicks after a 1–1 draw with Panama in the final. It was Costa Rica's sixth title out of nine tournaments played. Panama reached the UNCAF final for the first time but also lost on penalty kicks in the final of the CONCACAF Gold Cup 2005.

== Participating nations ==
For El Salvador 2007, UNCAF considered for the first time since the tournament's founding in 1991 to invite national teams from outside of Central America to participate. The organization was in negotiations with Mexico and Venezuela to participate. In the end, this did not happen, and the tournament (officially listed as the UNCAF Copa de Naciones Digicel) proceeded with only the seven UNCAF members.

Participating teams include the seven UNCAF members:

- Belize
- Costa Rica
- El Salvador
- Guatemala
- Honduras
- Nicaragua
- Panama

== Stadium ==
2007 UNCAF Nations Cup is located in El Salvador	San Salvador
2007 UNCAF Nations Cup is located in El Salvador	Estadio Cuscatlán
2007 UNCAF Nations Cup is located in El Salvador	Capacity: 53,400

== First round ==
=== Group 1 ===
Team	Pts	Pld	W	D	L	GF	GA	GD
El Salvador	7	3	2	1	0	4	2	+2
Guatemala	7	3	2	1	0	2	0	+2
Nicaragua	3	3	1	0	2	5	5	0
Belize	0	3	0	0	3	3	7	-4

8 February 2007

Guatemala	1–0	Nicaragua
Quiñónez 29'

Estadio Cuscatlán, San Salvador
Referee: Jose Pineda (Honduras)
8 February 2007

El Salvador	2–1	Belize
Rodríguez 25'; Quintanilla 55'		Benavides 64'

Estadio Cuscatlán, San Salvador
Referee: Wálter Quesada (Costa Rica)

10 February 2007

Belize	0–1	Guatemala
		Cabrera 8'

Estadio Cuscatlán, San Salvador
Referee: Rolando Vidal (Panama)
10 February 2007

El Salvador	2–1	Nicaragua
Quintanilla 16', 65'		Wilson 53'

Estadio Cuscatlán, San Salvador
Referee: Germán Arredondo (Mexico)

12 February 2007

Nicaragua	4–2	Belize
Palacios 12', 20', 68'; Busto 28'		McCauley 25', 34'

Estadio Cuscatlán, San Salvador
Referee: Wálter Quesada (Costa Rica)
12 February 2007

El Salvador	0–0	Guatemala

Estadio Cuscatlán, San Salvador
Referee: Benito Archundia (Mexico)

=== Group 2 ===
Team	Pts	Pld	W	D	L	GF	GA	GD
Panama	4	2	1	1	0	2	1	+1
Costa Rica	3	2	1	0	1	3	2	+1
Honduras	1	2	0	1	1	2	4	-2

9 February 2007

Costa Rica	3–1	Honduras
Fonseca 4', 70'; González 46'		Martínez 58'

Estadio Cuscatlán, San Salvador
Referee: Benito Archundia (Mexico)

11 February 2007

Honduras	1–1	Panama
Guardia 26' (o.g.)		Rivera 80'

Estadio Cuscatlán, San Salvador
Referee: Joel Aguilar (El Salvador)

13 February 2007

Panama	1–0	Costa Rica
Blanco 87'

Estadio Cuscatlán, San Salvador
Referee: Carlos Batres (Guatemala)

== Fifth place ==
15 February 2007

Nicaragua	1–9	Honduras
Wilson 31'		J. Martínez 3'; Velásquez 6', 27', 37', 39' (pen.); S. Martínez 68', 80', 84'; Mejía 78'

Estadio Cuscatlán, San Salvador
Referee: Joel Aguilar (El Salvador)

Honduras qualifies for the 2007 CONCACAF Gold Cup

== Semifinals ==
16 February 2007

Panama	2–0	Guatemala
Phillips 50'; Baloy 90+2' (pen.)

Estadio Cuscatlán, San Salvador
Referee: German Arredondo (Mexico)
16 February 2007

El Salvador	0–2	Costa Rica
		Wallace 11'; Fonseca 13'

Estadio Cuscatlán, San Salvador
Referee: Benito Archundia (Mexico)

All semifinalists qualify for the 2007 CONCACAF Gold Cup

== Third place ==
18 February 2007

Guatemala	1–0	El Salvador
Albizuris 82'

Estadio Cuscatlán, San Salvador
Referee: Wálter Quesada (Costa Rica)

== Final ==
18 February 2007
Final

Panama	1–1	Costa Rica
Tejada 36'		Bernard 85'
Penalties
Baloy (penalty missed); Herrera (penalty missed); Escobar (penalty scored)	1–4	(penalty scored) Centeno; (penalty scored) Fonseca; (penalty scored) Hernández; (penalty scored) Barrantes

Estadio Cuscatlán,, San Salvador, El Salvador
Referee: Carlos Batres (Guatemala)

== Awards ==
2007 UNCAF Nations Cup winner

Costa Rica
Sixth title

== Scorers ==
4 goals

- (Honduras) Wilmer Velásquez

3 goals

- (El Salvador) Eliseo Quintanilla
- (Nicaragua) Emilio Palacios
- (Honduras) Saúl Martínez
- (Costa Rica) Rolando Fonseca

2 goals

- (Belize) Deon McCauley
- (Nicaragua) Samuel Wilson

1 goal

- (Costa Rica) Leonardo González
- (Costa Rica) Harold Wallace
- (Costa Rica) Kurt Bernard
- (El Salvador) Juan Díaz Rodríguez
- (Guatemala) Claudio Albizuris
- (Guatemala) Gustavo Cabrera
- (Nicaragua) Milton Busto
- (Honduras) Emil Martínez
- (Honduras) Carlos Will Mejía
- (Panama) Alberto Blanco
- (Panama) Luis Tejada
- (Panama) Ricardo Phillips
- (Panama) Felipe Baloy
- (Panama) Carlos Rivera

1 goal (Own Goal)

- (Panama) Ubaldo Guardia
