= List of Panama international footballers =

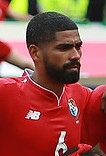
Gabriel Gómez is Panama's most capped international of all time with 148 caps.

The Panama national football team has represented Panama in international football since 1937, when they played their first international, a 2–1 win over Venezuela at the 1938 Central American and Caribbean Games. The national team is organized by the Panamanian Football Federation.

== Players ==
As of match played 18 November 2024

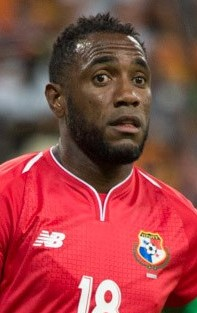
Luis Tejada is Panama's record goalscorer with 43 goals from 108 caps.

Key
**Bold**	Played for the national team in the past year

Panama national team footballers with at least 25 appearances
No.	Name	National career	Caps	Goals
1	Gabriel Gómez	2003–2018	148	12
2	**Aníbal Godoy**	2010—	144	4
3	Alberto Quintero	2007–2023	138	7
4	Jaime Penedo	2003–2018	137	0
5	Armando Cooper	2006–2022	123	9
5	Blas Pérez	2001–2018	123	42
7	Román Torres	2005–2019	120	10
8	Luis Tejada	2001–2018	108	43
9	Gabriel Torres	2005–2022	105	24
10	Felipe Baloy	2001–2018	103	4
11	**Yoel Bárcenas**	2016—	95	9
12	Harold Cummings	2010–2023	94	1
12	**Eric Davis**	2010—	94	7
14	Adolfo Machado	2008–2021	93	2
15	Luis Henríquez	2003–2016	92	2
16	Ricardo Phillips	1996–2010	84	10
16	**Fidel Escobar**	2015—	84	3
18	Amílcar Henríquez	2005–2017	83	0
19	**Michael Amir Murillo**	2016—	81	8
20	Luis Moreno	2001–2011	76	0
21	José Anthony Torres	1999–2009	75	0
22	Carlos Rivera	2004–2010	66	2
23	**Adalberto Carrasquilla**	2018—	63	2
24	Alberto Blanco	1999–2009	61	3
25	Ángel Luis Rodríguez	1995–2010	59	3
26	Rolando Blackburn	2010–2023	57	12
27	Juan Carlos Cubillas	1996–2005	56	2
27	**José Fajardo**	2017—	56	15
29	Roberto Brown	2000–2011	54	15
30	**Luis Mejía**	2009—	53	0
30	**José Luis Rodríguez**	2018—	53	7
32	Franklin Delgado	1988–2000	51	0
33	Julio Medina III	1997–2008	50	0
33	**Cristian Martínez**	2016—	50	1
35	Neftalí Díaz	1992–2005	49	7
36	Jorge Dely Valdés	1991–2005	48	18
37	Abdiel Arroyo	2014–2019	47	7
37	Pércival Piggott	1988–2000	47	2
37	**César Yanis**	2020—	47	4
40	Nelson Barahona	2007–2014	46	4
41	**Roderick Miller**	2011—	45	2
42	José Calderón	2005–2021	44	0
42	Julio Dely Valdés	1991–2005	44	19
44	Ricardo James	1993–2004	43	0
45	**Ismael Díaz**	2014—	42	9
46	Rolando Escobar	2003–2015	41	1
46	Ubaldo Guardia	2000–2007	41	0
48	Marcos Sánchez	2011–2019	40	2
48	Alfredo Sandford	1946–1957	40	0
48	**Cecilio Waterman**	2010—	40	10
51	Juan Pérez	2007–2013	37	0
52	**Andrés Andrade**	2018—	36	1
52	Mario Méndez	1996–2003	36	4
52	Engie Mitre	2003–2007	36	0
55	José Luis Garcés	2000–2009	34	9
55	Víctor Herrera	2001–2010	34	2
57	Víctor René Mendieta	1980–2000	33	13
57	Manuel Torres	2000–2009	33	0
57	**Abdiel Ayarza**	2019—	33	4
60	Miguel Camargo	2014–2023	32	3
60	Donaldo González	1996–2006	32	0
60	**Orlando Mosquera**	2020—	32	0
63	Joel Solanilla	2003–2009	31	0
64	Edwin Aguilar	2005–2020	30	7
65	Leonel Parris	2005–2015	29	0
66	Luis Ovalle	2010–2018	28	0
66	Valentín Pimentel	2015–2019	28	1
66	**Alfredo Stephens**	2014—	28	1
66	**César Blackman**	2019—	28	2
70	Ricardo Buitrago	2010–2017	26	2
70	Frank Lozada	1988–2000	26	0
70	Óscar McFarlane	2001–2014	26	0
70	Luis Rentería	2010–2013	26	5
70	Carlos Rodríguez	2011–2014	26	1
75	José Alfredo Poyatos	1988–1997	25	0
75	Juan Ramón Solís	2003–2010	25	2
