= 2010 Liga Panameña de Fútbol Clausura Final =

- Event: 2010 LPF Clausura
San Francisco	Árabe Unido
0	1
- Date: 14 May 2010
- Venue: Estadio Rommel Fernández, Panama City
- Man of the Match: José Justavino (Árabe Unido)
- Referee: Rolando Vidal (Panama)
- Attendance: 20,125

The 2010 Liga Panameña de Fútbol Clausura Final was the final match of the 2010 Liga Panameña de Fútbol Clausura, the 26th season of the top league competition in Panamanian football.

== Background ==
San Francisco went into the match as six-time Liga Panameña de Fútbol winners, having previously won in 1994-95, 1995-96, 2006, 2007 (C), 2008 (A) and 2009 (A), while Árabe Unido had won the competition five times previously, having won in 1998-99, 2001, 2004, 2008 (C) and 2009 (C).

During the 2010 Clausura season, San Francisco drew 1–1 against Árabe Unido at the Armando Dely Valdés in January with goals from Alberto Zapata and Víctor René Mendieta Jr. respectively, and defeated them 2–0 at the Agustín Sánchez in March with goals from Ricardo Phillips and Boris Alfaro.

San Francisco's Amir White is the only player who missed this final due to a suspension.

=== Previous finals ===
This is the second final between these two clubs, the previous match dates back to December 2, 2007 when San Francisco defeated Árabe Unido in a penalty shoot-out.

== Match ==
=== Details ===
14 May 2010
20:30 (UTC-5)

San Francisco	0 – 1	Árabe Unido
	Report	José Justavino 46'

Estadio Rommel Fernández, Panama City
Attendance: 20,125
Referee: Rolando Vidal (Panama)

San Francisco	Árabe Unido

INTERNAZIONALE:
GK	16	(Colombia) William Negrete
RB	15	(Panama) Osvaldo González	(substituted off) 65'
CB	3	(Panama) Rolando Algandona
CB	2	(Panama) Carlos Rivera
LB	7	(Panama) Wess Torres	Booked
RM	18	(Panama) Ricardo Phillips
DM	4	(Panama) Juan Ramón Solis	Booked
DM	5	(Panama) Manuel Torres (c)	Booked
LM	11	(Panama) Víctor Herrera
FW	19	(Colombia) Johan de Avila	Booked
FW	26	(Panama) Alberto Zapata	(substituted off) 80'
Substitutes:
FW	21	(Panama) Boris Alfaro	(substituted on) 65'
RM	10	(Panama) Luis Olivardia	(substituted on) 80'
Manager:
(Panama) Gary Stempel

ROMA:
GK	1	(Colombia) Carlos Bejarano
RB	31	(Panama) Eric Davis
CB	4	(Colombia) Andrés Santamaría
CB	32	(Panama) Harold Cummings
LB	21	(Panama) David Daniels
RM	11	(Panama) Armando Cooper (c)
DM	6	(Panama) Alejandro Vélez	Booked
CM	18	(Panama) Luis Ángel Rodríguez
LM	13	(Panama) José Justavino	(substituted off) 75'	(yellow card) 47'
FW	16	(Panama) Víctor René Mendieta Jr.	(substituted off) 65'
FW	22	(Panama) Publio Rodríguez	(red card) 49'
Substitutes:
FW	10	(Panama) Orlando Rodríguez	(substituted on) 65'
LM	23	(Colombia) Camilo Aguirre	(substituted on) 75'
Manager:
(Colombia) Richard Parra

MATCH OFFICIALS

- Assistant referees:
  - Hairo Fuentes (Panama)
  - Jaime Smith (Panama)
- Fourth official: Jaffet Perea (Panama)

MATCH RULES

- 90 minutes.
- 30 minutes of extra-time if necessary.
- Penalty shoot-out if scores still level.
- Maximum of three substitutions.

2010 Clausura Champion:

Árabe Unido
6th Title
