= 2002 ANAPROF =

ANAPROF
- Season: 2002
- Champions: Árabe Unido; Apertura; CD Plaza Amador; Clausura
- Relegated: -
- -: -

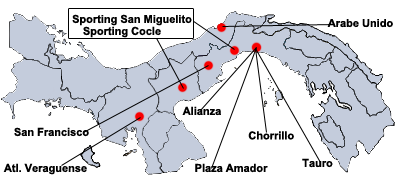
ANAPROF 2002 team distribution

ANAPROF 2002 is the 2002 season of the Panamanian football league, ANAPROF. The season started on March 17, 2002 with the Torneo Apertura 2002 and finalized on November 24, 2002 with the Torneo Clausura 2002. The Apertura champion was Árabe Unido and the Clausura champion was Plaza Amador, on November 30, 2002 the ANAPROF 2002 final was played and Plaza Amador was crowned champion over Deportivo Árabe Unido.

== Change for 2002 ==
- There will be no relegation because the Primera A championship was not played in 2002.
- In the 2002 Apertura, the teams were divided into two groups where the top two teams of each group will play a two-leg semifinal and a single final match.
- For the 2002 Clausura the two groups format was abandoned and replaced with a single aggregate table format where the top four teams will participate in for a pair of home-and-away series. The top two teams of this cuadrangular series will play a home and away final match.
- For the Apertura championship Sporting '89 changed its name to Sporting San Miguelito. Ando for the Clausura championship Sporting San Miguelito were renamed Sporting Coclé after they re-located to Antón Coclé.

== Teams ==
Club	City	Stadium
Alianza F.C.	Panama City	Estadio Camping Resort
Deportivo Árabe Unido	Colon	Estadio Mariano Bula
Atlético Veragüense	Santiago	Estadio Omar Torrijos
El Chorrillo F.C.	Panama City	Estadio Municipal de Balboa
Plaza Amador	Panama City	Estadio Rommel Fernández; Estadio Municipal de Balboa
San Francisco F.C.	La Chorrera	Estadio Agustín Sánchez
Sporting San Miguelito; Sporting Coclé*	San Miguelito; Penonome	Estadio Rommel Fernández; Estadio Municipal de Ciruelito
Tauro F.C.	Panama City	Estadio Rommel Fernández

- [*] From the Clausura championship, Sporting San Miguelito re-located themselves to the Coclé Province.

== Apertura 2002 ==
=== Standings ===
==== Group A ====
Pos	Team	Pld	W	D	L	GF	GA	GD	Pts	Qualification
1	Árabe Unido	10	5	4	1	16	11	+5	19	Qualified to the final round
2	Tauro	10	5	3	2	18	10	+8	18	Qualified to the final round
3	Alianza	10	4	3	3	13	14	−1	15	
4	El Chorrillo	10	4	2	4	16	16	0	14	

==== Group B ====
Pos	Team	Pld	W	D	L	GF	GA	GD	Pts	Qualification
1	San Francisco	10	5	3	2	14	10	+4	18	Qualified to the final round
2	Sporting San Miguelito	10	4	2	4	12	14	−2	14	Qualified to the final round
3	Plaza Amador	10	2	3	5	7	9	−2	9	
4	Atlético Veragüense	10	0	2	8	10	22	−12	2	

=== Results table ===
Home \ Away	ALI	ÁRA	ATL	CHO	PLA	SAN	SPO	TAU
Alianza	—	2–1	bye	1–1	bye	2–0	1–1	3–3
Árabe Unido	1–0	—	bye	3–2	1–0	bye	3–1	1–1
Atl. Veragüense	1–2	1–2	—	bye	2–2	2–2	2–3	bye
Chorrillo	3–1	2–2	2–0	—	1–0	1–2	1–4	2–3
Plaza Amador	0–1	bye	3–0	bye	—	1–0	0–1	bye
San Francisco	bye	1–1	3–1	bye	1–1	—	1–0	1–0
Sporting	bye	bye	1–0	bye	0–0	1–3	—	bye
Tauro	3–0	1–1	2–1	0–1	2–0	3–0	bye	—

Legend: Blue = home team win; Yellow = draw; Red = away team win.

=== Final round ===
Semifinals (agg)
Árabe Unido	3
Sporting San Miguelito	3
San Francisco	2
Tauro	2

Final
Árabe Unido	2
San Francisco	0

==== Semifinals 1st leg ====
May 3, 2002

Sporting San Miguelito	1-2	Árabe Unido
Luciano Paz 65'		Agustin Salinas 50'; Blas Pérez 91'

Estadio Municipal Balboa

May 7, 2002

Tauro	1-0	San Francisco
Anel Canales

Estadio Rommel Fernández

==== Semifinals 2nd leg ====
May 10, 2002

Árabe Unido	1-2	Sporting San Miguelito
Penalties
	4-2

Estadio Mariano Bula

Árabe Unido advances to final 4-2 on penalties

May 10, 2002

San Francisco	2-1	Tauro
Penalties
	4-2

Estadio Agustín Sánchez

San Francisco advances to final 4-2 on penalties

==== Final ====
May 18, 2002

Árabe Unido	2-0	San Francisco
Emmanuel Ceballos 27'; Blas Pérez 87'

Estadio Rommel Fernández

Apertura 2002 champion
Árabe Unido

=== Top goal scorer ===
Position	Player	Scored for	Goals
1	(Panama) Gabriel de la Hoz	Alianza	7

== Clausura 2002 ==
=== Standings ===
Pos	Team	Pld	W	D	L	GF	GA	GD	Pts	Qualification
1	Tauro	14	7	6	1	22	14	+8	27	Qualified to the final round
2	Plaza Amador	14	6	6	2	26	15	+11	24	Qualified to the final round
3	El Chorrillo	14	6	5	3	21	14	+7	23	Qualified to the final round
4	Árabe Unido	14	5	7	2	18	13	+5	22	Qualified to the final round
5	San Francisco	14	5	3	6	19	18	+1	18	
6	Sporting Coclé	14	3	4	7	13	22	−9	13	
7	Alianza	14	2	6	6	18	29	−11	12	
8	Atlético Veragüense	14	1	5	8	11	23	−12	8	

=== Results table ===
Home \ Away	ALI	ÁRA	ATL	CHO	PLA	SAN	SPO	TAU
Alianza	—	2–2	4–3	1–4	1–3	2–2	1–3	1–1
Árabe Unido	2–1	—	2–0	1–1	0–0	1–0	1–1	1–2
Atl. Veragüense	0–0	1–3	—	0–1	1–2	0–1	1–0	2–2
El Chorrillo	2–1	1–2	0–0	—	0–0	2–0	5–1	1–1
Plaza Amador	1–1	1–1	5–2	3–1	—	0–1	2–2	4–0
San Francisco	5–1	0–0	1–1	1–2	2–1	—	1–2	1–3
Sporting	0–1	2–1	0–0	0–0	2–3	0–4	—	0–1
Tauro	1–1	1–1	2–0	3–1	1–1	3–0	1–0	—

Legend: Blue = home team win; Yellow = draw; Red = away team win.

=== Final round ===
==== Cuadrangular semifinal ====
Team	Pld	W	D	L	GF	GA	GD	Pts	Qualification	TAU	PLA	CHO	DAU
Tauro	6	4	0	2	12	10	+2	12	Qualified for the final		1–2	0–3	3–1
Plaza Amador	6	3	1	2	10	0	+10	10	Qualified for the final	1–2		1–0	3–2
El Chorrillo	6	3	0	3	11	8	+3	9		1–3	3–2		4–1
Árabe Unido	6	1	1	4	8	14	−6	4		2–3	1–1	1–0	

==== Final 1st leg ====
November 20, 2002

Plaza Amador	2-1	Tauro
Alejandro Dawson 18'; José Justavino 19'		Luis Tejada 76'

Estadio Municipal de Balboa

==== Final 2nd leg ====
November 24, 2002

Tauro	1-0	Plaza Amador
Ricardo Phillips 24'
Penalties
Anel Canales (penalty scored); Ricardo Phillips (penalty missed); Eric Martinez (penalty missed)	1-4	(penalty scored) Victor Suarez; (penalty scored) Jose Rodriguez; (penalty scored) Javier Castro; (penalty scored) Alejandro Dawson

Campo de Deportes Giancarlo Gronchi

Plaza Amador won 1-4 on penalties

Clausura 2002 champion
Plaza Amador

=== Top goal scorer ===
Position	Player	Scored for	Goals
1	(Panama) Anel Canales	Tauro	10

== ANAPROF 2002 grand final ==
Club	Champion
Árabe Unido	ANAPROF 2002 Apertura Champion
Plaza Amador	ANAPROF 2002 Clausura Champion

=== Final ===
November 30, 2002

Árabe Unido	0-2	Plaza Amador
		José Justavino; Gustavo Favalli

Estadio Agustín Sánchez

ANAPROF 2002 champion
Plaza Amador
4th title

== Local derby statistics ==
El Super Clasico Nacional - Tauro v Plaza Amador

March 17, 2002

Tauro	2–0	Plaza Amador
Luis Tejada 27'; Anel Wilshire 90'

Estadio Rommel Fernández

July 28, 2002

Tauro	1–1	Plaza Amador
Anel Canales 48'		Joel Solanilla 87'

Giancarlo Gronchi

September 13, 2002

Plaza Amador	4–0	Tauro
Alejandro Dawson 7' 42' 75'; Jose Rodriguez 74'

Balboa

October 22, 2002

Plaza Amador	1–2	Tauro
Angel Lombardo 47'		Anel Canales 3'; Pablo Romero 73'

Balboa

October 27, 2002

Tauro	1–2	Plaza Amador
Eric Martinez 52'		Gustavo Favali 56'; Diego Maier 66'

Giancarlo Gronchi

November 20, 2002

Plaza Amador	2–1	Tauro
Alejandro Dawson 18'; José Justavino 19'		Luis Tejada 76'

Estadio Municipal de Balboa

November 24, 2002

Tauro	1–0	Plaza Amador
Ricardo Phillips 24'

Giancarlo Gronchi

Clasico del Pueblo - Plaza Amador v El Chorillo

March 31, 2002

El Chorrillo	1–0	Plaza Amador
Bladimir Medina 71'

Balboa

July 21, 2002

El Chorrillo	0–0	Plaza Amador

Balboa

September 6, 2002

Plaza Amador	3–1	El Chorrillo
Alejandro Dawson 24'; Gustavo Favali 37'; Victor Suarez		Ricardo Paschall 60'

Balboa

October 13, 2002

Plaza Amador	1–0	El Chorrillo
Gustavo Favali 25'

Balboa

November 10, 2002

El Chorrillo	3–2	Plaza Amador
Ricardo Paschall (2); Temistocles Perez		Diego Maier; Alejandro Dawson

Balboa
