= 1999–2000 ANAPROF =

ANAPROF
- Season: 1999–2000
- Champions: Tauro
- Relegated: Atlético Municipal Colón
- Copa Interclubes UNCAF: Tauro; Plaza Amador
- Matches played: 110
- Goals scored: 302 (2.75 per match)
- Top goalscorer: (Panama) René Mendieta (15)
- Biggest home win: Sporting '89 6–0 Eurokickers
- Biggest away win: Chiriquí 1–5 Panamá Viejo; Tauro 2–6 Árabe Unido
- Highest scoring: Tauro 2–6 Árabe Unido

The ANAPROF 1999–2000 season was the twelfth season since its establishment. It began on August 1, 1999, and ended on January 30, 2000. 10 teams competed in the league, 9 of which returned from the previous season and 1 of which was promoted from Primera A.

Tauro were crowned champions after defeating Plaza Amador 2-0 in the Rommel Fernández becoming Tauro's fifth title in its history. After clinching this title Tauro earned the Panama 1 spot in the 2001 season of the Copa Interclubes UNCAF while Plaza Amador earned the Panama 2 spot as the runner-up.

Previous to the start of the season there was a championship that went on from April to July amongst the participating teams to determine who would play in the 2000 season of the Copa Interclubes UNCAF; the 1999–2000 Campeonato Apertura. Panamá Viejo was crowned champion on July 2 after defeating Tauro 2-0.

== Teams ==
Locations of the 1999-2000 ANAPROF teams

Club	City	Stadium	1998-99 season
Árabe Unido	Colón	Estadio Mariano Bula	2nd in ANAPROF (champion)
Atlético Nacional	Panama City	Estadio Agustín Sánchez	6th in ANAPROF (hexagonal)
Chiriquí F.C.	David	Estadio Kenny Serracin; Estadio San Cristóbal	8th in ANAPROF
Atlético Municipal Colón	Colón	Estadio Mariano Bula	Primera A champion
Eurokickers F.C.	Panama City	Estadio Rommel Fernández; Estadio Javier Cruz	9th in ANAPROF
Panamá Viejo F.C.	Panama City	Estadio Rommel Fernández	4th in ANAPROF (hexagonal)
Plaza Amador	Panama City	Estadio Rommel Fernández	5th in ANAPROF (Runner-up)
San Francisco F.C.	La Chorrera	Estadio Agustín Sánchez	7th in ANAPROF
Sporting '89	San Miguelito	Estadio Rommel Fernández; Estadio Javier Cruz	1st in ANAPROF
Tauro F.C.	Panama City	Estadio Javier Cruz; Estadio Rommel Fernández	Copa Rommel Fernández champion

== Standings ==
Pos	Team	Pld	W	D	L	GF	GA	GD	Pts	Qualification or relegation
1	Sporting '89	18	11	5	2	34	15	+19	38	Qualified to the Final round
2	Árabe Unido	18	10	5	3	33	17	+16	35	Qualified to the Final round
3	Tauro	18	7	9	2	28	20	+8	30	Qualified to the Final round
4	Panamá Viejo	18	8	6	4	25	20	+5	30	Qualified to the Final round
5	Plaza Amador	18	6	6	6	18	20	−2	24	Qualified to the Final round
6	Atlético Nacional	18	5	7	6	23	24	−1	22	Qualified to the Final round
7	San Francisco	18	5	6	7	25	26	−1	21	
8	Chiriquí	17	5	2	10	16	28	−12	17	
9	Eurokickers	17	2	8	7	23	34	−11	14	
10	Municipal Colón	18	1	4	13	17	38	−21	7	

Updated to match(es) played on 25 April 2010. Source: rsssf.com
Rules for classification: 1) points; 2) goal difference; 3) number of goals scored.

== Results ==
Home \ Away	DÁU	AN	CHI	EK	AMC	PV	PA	SF	S89	TAU
Árabe Unido		2–0	1–0	1–1	5–1	3–0	2–1	3–1	0–0	1–1
Atlético Nacional	4–0		1–2	1–2	1–1	0–0	0–1	1–1	1–1	1–1
Chiriquí	1–0	3–0		– (Note: The eighteenth-round game between Chiriquí-Eurokickers was eliminated due both to its irrelevance in the standings as both teams were already safe from relegation and had no chances of qualifying to the final round, and also to eliminate the expenses of traveling to Chiriquí.)	1–0	1–5	1–2	0–1	2–5	0–3
Eurokickers	1–4	2–3	1–1		4–1	0–1	2–4	2–2	1–2	1–1
Municipal Colón	2–3	1–1	2–1	2–2		1–2	1–1	2–4	0–1	0–1
Panamá Viejo	0–0	3–3	2–1	1–0	2–0		0–1	1–2	2–4	0–0
Plaza Amador	0–1	0–1	0–0	1–1	3–2	1–1		0–2	0–0	0–3
San Francisco	1–1	1–2	0–1	2–2	2–1	2–1	0–1		1–2	0–1
Sporting '89	1–0	3–2	1–0	6–0	3–0	1–2	1–0	1–1		1–2
Tauro	2–6	0–1	4–1	1–1	1–0	1–1	2–2	3–3	1–1	

Legend: Blue = home team win; Yellow = draw; Red = away team win.

== Final round ==
=== Hexagonal ===
Pos	Team	Pld	W	D	L	GF	GA	GD	Pts	TAU	S89	PA	DÁU	PV	AN
1	Tauro (A)	5	2	2	1	8	6	+2	8		1–1			3–1	1–0
2	Sporting '89 (A)	5	2	2	1	9	8	+1	8			2–1	3–2		2–3
3	Plaza Amador (A)	5	2	2	1	6	5	+1	8	1–1			2–1	1–1	1–0
4	Árabe Unido (A)	5	2	1	2	9	8	+1	7	3–2					2–0
5	Panamá Viejo	5	1	3	1	9	9	0	6		1–1		1–1		5–3
6	Atlético Nacional	5	1	0	4	6	11	−5	3						

(A) Qualified for the semifinals

=== Semifinals ===
Semifinals (agg)
1	Tauro	4
4	Árabe Unido	3
2	Sporting '89	2
3	Plaza Amador	2

Final
1	Tauro	2
3	Plaza Amador	0

==== Semifinals ====
Semifinal 1

January 14, 2000
20:00 (UTC-5)

Árabe Unido	2 – 0	Tauro
Anderson 67'; Medina III 72'	Report

Estadio Rommel Fernández, Panama City

January 16, 2000
13:30 (UTC-5)

Sporting '89	2 – 0	Plaza Amador
Ortega 21'; Dawson 67'	Report

Estadio Rommel Fernández, Panama City
Referee: Roberto Moreno (Panama)

Semifinal 2

January 21, 2000
20:00 (UTC-5)

Plaza Amador	2 – 0 (a.e.t.)	Sporting '89
Capretta 69'; Pereira 90+3'	Report
Penalties
Correa (penalty missed); Méndez (penalty scored); Villareal (penalty scored); Capretta (penalty scored); Rivas (penalty scored)	4 – 3	(penalty scored) Delgado; (penalty scored) Martínez; (penalty scored) López; (penalty missed) Ortega; (penalty missed) Serrano

Estadio Rommel Fernández, Panama City
Referee: Roberto Moreno (Panama)

January 24, 2000
20:00 (UTC-5)

Tauro	4 – 1 (a.e.t.)	Árabe Unido
Mendieta , 74 ', 82'; Parra 93'	Report	Anderson 35'

Estadio Rommel Fernández, Panama City
Referee: Carlos de León (Panama)
- Note: The Semifinal 2 game between Tauro-Árabe Unido was originally played on January 23 at 1:30 PM (UTC-5) but was suspended after the end of the first half of extra time after a group of Árabe Unido's fans invaded the field, Tauro was leading the scoreboard 3-1 at the time. The two periods of extra time were replayed the next day.

==== Final ====
January 30, 2000
14:00 (UTC-5)

Plaza Amador	0 – 2	Tauro
	Report	Mendieta 36 ', 40'

Estadio Rommel Fernández, Panama City
Referee: Carlos de León (Panama)

1999–2000 champion
Tauro
5th title

=== Top goal scorer ===
Position	Player	Scored for	Goals
1	(Panama) René Mendieta	Tauro	15

== Local derby statistics ==
El Super Clasico Nacional - Tauro v Plaza Amador

August 27, 1999
20:00 (UTC-5)

Tauro	2 – 2	Plaza Amador
René Mendieta; Rubén Guevara	Report	Roberto Correa; Alejandro Davis

Estadio Rommel Fernández, Panama City

October 29, 1999
20:00 (UTC-5)

Plaza Amador	0 – 3	Tauro
	Report	René Mendieta

Estadio Rommel Fernández, Panama City

January 8, 2000
20:00 (UTC-5)

Plaza Amador	1 – 1	Tauro
Roberto Correa	Report	Rubén Guevara

Estadio Rommel Fernández, Panama City

January 30, 2000
14:00 (UTC-5)

Plaza Amador	0 – 2	Tauro
	Report	Mendieta 36 ', 40'

Estadio Rommel Fernández, Panama City
Referee: Carlos de León (Panama)
