= 2003 ANAPROF =

ANAPROF Bellsouth
- Season: 2003
- Champions: Tauro FC; Apertura; Tauro FC; Clausura
- Relegated: -
- -: -

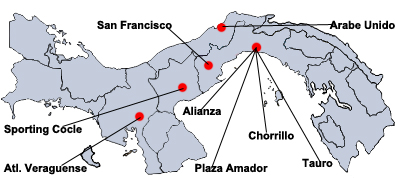
ANAPROF 2003 team distribution

ANAPROF 2003 is the 2003 season of the Asociación Nacional Pro Fútbol (ANAPROF), the Panamanian professional football league. The season started on February 26, 2003 with the Torneo Apertura Bellsouth 2003 (Bellsouth Opening Tournament 2003), and ended on October 26, 2003 with the Torneo Clausura Bellsouth 2003 (Bellsouth Closing Tournament 2003). The champion of both the opening and closing tournaments were Tauro; therefore, for the second time in history, Tauro were crowned ANAPROF champions without the need to play a grand final.

== Changes for 2003 ==
- There was no relegation. ANAPROF expanded the number of teams from eight to ten starting with the 2004 season.
- In the closing tournament, the four-team semifinal group was dropped; it was replaced with a pair of home-and-away series featuring the top four teams of the season.
- For the closing championship, the final was played in a single match format.

== Teams ==
Club	City	Stadium
Alianza F.C.	Panama City	Estadio Camping Resort
Club Deportivo Árabe Unido	Colon	Estadio Armando Dely Valdés
Atlético Veragüense	Santiago	Estadio Omar Torrijos
El Chorrillo F.C.	Panama City	Estadio Municipal de Balboa
Plaza Amador	Panama City	Estadio Municipal de Balboa; Estadio Javier Cruz
San Francisco F.C.	La Chorrera	Estadio Agustín Sánchez
Sporting Coclé	Penonome	Estadio Municipal de Ciruelito
Tauro F.C.	Panama City	Campo de Deportes Giancarlo Gronchi

== Apertura 2003 ==
=== Standings ===
Pos	Team	Pld	W	D	L	GF	GA	GD	Pts	Qualification
1	Árabe Unido	14	7	6	1	20	10	+10	27	Qualified for the final round
2	Plaza Amador	14	7	5	2	24	12	+12	26	Qualified for the final round
3	El Chorrillo	14	4	8	2	20	16	+4	20	Qualified for the final round
4	Tauro	14	5	5	4	17	16	+1	20	Qualified for the final round
5	San Francisco	14	4	6	4	15	14	+1	18	
6	Alianza	14	4	3	7	18	20	−2	15	
7	Atlético Veragüense	14	2	8	4	19	25	−6	14	
8	Sporting Coclé	14	1	3	10	10	30	−20	6	

=== Results table ===
Home \ Away	ALI	ÁRA	ATL	CHO	PLA	SAN	SPO	TAU
Alianza	—	1–1	1–0	1–2	1–2	2–3	4–0	1–1
Árabe Unido	1–0	—	2–2	0–0	2–2	1–1	1–0	0–1
Atl. Veragüense	2–1	0–3	—	1–4	2–2	2–2	1–0	4–4
Chorrillo	2–2	1–1	1–1	—	2–4	2–1	0–0	1–1
Plaza Amador	3–0	2–1	0–0	2–0	—	0–1	3–1	0–0
San Francisco	1–0	0–2	1–1	0–0	0–0	—	3–0	0–1
Sporting	1–2	1–3	2–2	1–4	0–4	1–1	—	1–2
Tauro	1–2	0–1	2–1	1–1	2–0	2–1	0–2	—

Legend: Blue = home team win; Yellow = draw; Red = away team win.

=== Final round ===
==== Cuadrangular semifinal ====
Team	Pld	W	D	L	GF	GA	GD	Pts	Qualification	DAU	TAU	CHO	PLA
Árabe Unido	6	3	3	0	10	4	+6	12	Qualified for the final		2–0	1–1	2–0
Tauro	6	3	1	2	7	5	+2	10	Qualified for the final	1–1		1–0	2–0
El Chorrillo	6	1	3	2	5	7	−2	6		1–3	2–1		0–0
Plaza Amador	6	0	3	3	2	8	−6	3		1–1	0–2	1–1	

==== Final 1st leg ====
June 15, 2003

Tauro	2-2	Árabe Unido
Hector Nazarith; Ricardo Phillips		Nicolás Muñoz; José Luis Garcés

Estadio Rommel Fernández

==== Final 2nd leg ====
June 22, 2003

Árabe Unido	1-4	Tauro
Nicolás Muñoz		Luis Tejada (2); Mario Mendez; Alfredo Hernandez

Estadio Armando Dely Valdés

Apertura 2003 champion
Tauro

=== Top goal scorer ===
Position	Player	Scored for	Goals
1	(Panama) Anel Canales	Chorrillo	11

== Clausura 2003 ==
=== Standings ===
Pos	Team	Pld	W	D	L	GF	GA	GD	Pts	Qualification
1	Tauro	14	6	7	1	28	11	+17	25	Qualified for the final round
2	Alianza	14	7	4	3	26	21	+5	25	Qualified for the final round
3	San Francisco	14	6	4	4	21	15	+6	22	Qualified for the final round
4	Atlético Veragüense	14	6	4	4	20	19	+1	22	Qualified for the final round
5	Árabe Unido	14	5	6	3	21	10	+11	21	
6	Plaza Amador	14	4	6	4	19	18	+1	18	
7	El Chorrillo	14	3	7	4	20	23	−3	16	
8	Sporting Coclé	14	0	0	14	4	42	−38	0	

=== Results table ===
Home \ Away	ALI	ÁRA	ATL	CHO	PLA	SAN	SPO	TAU
Alianza	—	1–1	3–1	2–0	4–2	2–3	3–1	2–4
Árabe Unido	0–1	—	2–1	3–0	0–0	2–2	5–0	0–0
Atl. Veragüense	1–1	1–0	—	4–4	1–0	1–0	1–0	1–0
Chorrillo	4–1	0–3	2–2	—	0–0	1–1	3–1	1–1
Plaza Amador	3–3	1–1	3–2	0–0	—	2–0	1–0	3–3
San Francisco	1–2	2–1	2–0	1–1	2–0	—	2–0	1–3
Sporting	0–1	0–2	1–3	0–4	0–4	0–4	—	1–6
Tauro	0–0	1–1	1–1	4–0	2–0	0–0	3–0	—

Legend: Blue = home team win; Yellow = draw; Red = away team win.

=== Final round ===
Semifinals (agg)
San Francisco	3
Alianza	4
Atlético Veragüense	3
Tauro	6

Final
Alianza	1
Tauro	5

==== Semifinals 1st leg ====
October 12, 2003

San Francisco	0-1	Alianza
		Alberto Zapata

Estadio Agustín Sánchez

October 12, 2003

Atlético Veragüense	1-2	Tauro
Wilfredo Mojica		William Aguilar; Jonathan Levi (OG)

Estadio Omar Torrijos

==== Semifinals 2nd leg ====
October 19, 2003

Alianza	3-2	San Francisco
Alberto Zapata (2); Cistobal Tenorio		Anel Canales; Victor Herrera Piggott

Estadio Camping Resort

October 18, 2003

Tauro	4-2	Atlético Veragüense
Hector Nazarith (3); Eric Martínez		José Panezo (2)

Campo de Deportes Giancarlo Gronchi

==== Final ====
October 26, 2003

Alianza	1-5	Tauro
Alberto Zapata		Hector Nazarith; Marco Aparicio; Rolando Palma; Ricardo Phillips; John Jairo Garcia

Estadio Agustín Sánchez

Clausura 2003 champion
Tauro

=== Top goal scorer ===
Position	Player	Scored for	Goals
1	(Colombia) Hector Nazarith (Colombia) Wilson Zuñiga	Tauro; Alianza	9

== ANAPROF 2003 Grand Final ==
Cancelled, as Tauro won both tournaments.

ANAPROF 2003 champion
Tauro
6th title

== Local derby statistics ==
El Super Clasico Nacional - Tauro v Plaza Amador

Plaza Amador	0–0	Tauro

Balboa

Tauro	2–0	Plaza Amador

Giancarlo Gronchi

Plaza Amador	0–2	Tauro

Rommel Fernández

Tauro	2–0	Plaza Amador

Giancarlo Gronchi

August 27, 2003

Tauro	2–0	Plaza Amador

Giancarlo Gronchi

October 5, 2003

Plaza Amador	3–3	Tauro

Javier Cruz

Clasico del Pueblo - Plaza Amador v El Chorillo

Plaza Amador	2–0	El Chorrillo

Balboa

El Chorrillo	2–4	Plaza Amador

Balboa

El Chorrillo	0–0	Plaza Amador

Balboa

Plaza Amador	1–1	El Chorrillo

Balboa

August 10, 2003

El Chorrillo	0–0	Plaza Amador

Balboa

September 19, 2003

Plaza Amador	0–0	El Chorrillo

Javier Cruz
