= 2004 ANAPROF =

ANAPROF Bellsouth
- Season: 2004
- Champions: Árabe Unido; Apertura; Árabe Unido; Clausura
- Relegated: -
- -: -

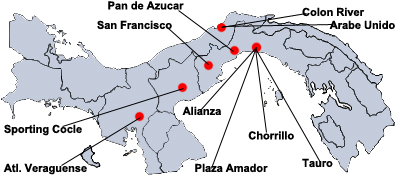
ANAPROF 2004 team distribution

ANAPROF 2004 is the 2004 season of the Panamanian football league, ANAPROF. The season started on February 13, 2004, with the Torneo Apertura Bellsouth 2004 and finalized on November 7, 2004, with the Torneo Clausura Bellsouth 2004. Both the Apertura and Clausura champion was Arabe Unido, therefore, for the third time in ANAPROF history, Arabe Unido were crowned ANAPROF 2004 champions without the need to play a grand final.

== Change for 2004 ==
- The number of teams in the league increased from 8 to 10.
- River Plate F.C. were renamed Colón River F.C. at the end of the Apertura championship.
- For the Clausura championship the final was played in two matches, each at the respective team's stadium.

== Teams ==
Club	City	Stadium
Alianza F.C.	Panama City	Estadio Camping Resort
Árabe Unido	Colon	Estadio Armando Dely Valdés
Atletico Veragüense	Santiago	Estadio Toco Castillo
Colón River F.C.	Colon	Estadio Armando Dely Valdés
El Chorrillo F.C.	Panama City	Estadio Municipal de Balboa
Pan de Azúcar	San Miguelito	Estadio Javier Cruz
Plaza Amador	Panama City	Estadio Municipal de Balboa
San Francisco F.C.	La Chorrera	Estadio Agustín Sánchez
Sporting Coclé	Penonome	Estadio Municipal de Ciruelito
Tauro F.C.	Panama City	Campo de Deportes Giancarlo Gronchi

== Apertura 2004 ==
=== Standings ===
Pos	Team	Pld	W	D	L	GF	GA	GD	Pts	Qualification
1	Árabe Unido	18	14	1	3	31	16	+15	43	Qualified to the final round.
2	Tauro	18	10	3	5	25	11	+14	33	Qualified to the final round.
3	Plaza Amador	18	10	3	5	25	15	+10	33	Qualified to the final round.
4	El Chorrillo	18	8	8	2	26	12	+14	32	Qualified to the final round.
5	San Francisco	18	9	5	4	22	14	+8	32	
6	Atlético Veragüense	18	7	4	7	23	16	+7	25	
7	Sporting Coclé	18	5	6	7	21	25	−4	21	
8	Alianza F.C.	18	3	5	10	10	24	−14	14	
9	River Plate	18	2	4	12	20	39	−19	10	
10	Pan de Azúcar	18	1	3	14	10	41	−31	6	

== Results table ==
Home \ Away	ALI	ÁRA	ATL	COL	CHO	PAN	PLA	SAN	SPO	TAU
Alianza	—	0–1	0–5	1–2	0–0	1–0	0–0	0–1	1–1	1–0
Árabe Unido	1–0	—	1–0	3–1	0–3	6–0	1–0	2–1	1–1	3–2
Atl. Veragüense	3–0	1–3	—	3–1	0–0	3–0	1–0	0–0	1–0	0–1
Colón River	0–1	1–3	2–2	—	1–2	2–0	2–3	0–1	1–1	0–1
Chorrillo	1–1	1–2	1–2	4–0	—	1–0	1–0	3–3	1–0	1–1
Pan de Azúcar	1–1	1–2	1–1	3–3	0–3	—	2–1	0–1	0–1	1–3
Plaza Amador	3–2	2–0	1–0	4–1	1–1	2–0	—	1–0	2–1	0–0
San Francisco	2–0	2–0	2–1	2–0	1–1	1–0	0–1	—	2–2	0–1
Sporting	1–0	0–1	1–0	3–3	0–2	3–1	3–2	2–2	—	1–2
Tauro	2–1	0–1	2–0	2–0	0–0	6–0	0–2	0–1	3–0	—

Legend: Blue = home team win; Yellow = draw; Red = away team win.

=== Final round ===
Semifinals (agg)
Plaza Amador	3
Tauro	2
Árabe Unido	3
El Chorrillo	0

Final
Plaza Amador	0
Árabe Unido	1

==== Semifinals 1st leg ====
May 16, 2004

Plaza Amador	3-1	Tauro
Alejandro Dawson (2); Alfredo Hernandez		Pablo Romero

Estadio Rommel Fernández

May 16, 2004

El Chorrillo	0-1	Árabe Unido
		Julio Medina III

Estadio Rommel Fernández

==== Semifinals 2nd leg ====
May 20, 2004

Tauro	1-0	Plaza Amador
Eric Martinez

Campo de Deportes Giancarlo Gronchi

May 19, 2004

Árabe Unido	2-0	El Chorrillo
Julio Dely Valdés; Jorge Dely Valdés

Estadio Armando Dely Valdés

==== Final ====
May 23, 2004

Plaza Amador	0-1	Árabe Unido
		Amílcar Henríquez

Estadio Rommel Fernández

Apertura 2005 champion
Árabe Unido

=== Top goal scorer ===
Position	Player	Scored for	Goals
1	(Panama) Jorge Dely Valdés	Árabe Unido	12

== Clausura 2004 ==
=== Standings ===
Pos	Team	Pld	W	D	L	GF	GA	GD	Pts	Qualification
1	Árabe Unido	18	12	4	2	32	14	+18	40	Qualified to the final round.
2	Tauro	18	11	3	4	36	11	+25	36	Qualified to the final round.
3	San Francisco	18	11	2	5	38	17	+21	35	Qualified to the final round.
4	El Chorrillo	18	11	2	5	32	19	+13	35	Qualified to the final round.
5	Plaza Amador	17	8	5	4	34	18	+16	29	
6	Alianza	18	9	1	8	28	29	−1	28	
7	Colón River	18	5	3	10	21	39	−18	18	
8	Sporting Coclé	18	4	3	11	21	35	−14	15	
9	Atlético Veragüense	17	3	3	11	15	36	−21	12	
10	Pan de Azúcar	18	0	4	14	12	51	−39	4	

=== Results table ===
Home \ Away	ALI	ÁRA	ATL	COL	CHO	PAN	PLA	SAN	SPO	TAU
Alianza	—	0–1	2–2	3–0	1–0	2–1	0–4	0–3	4–1	2–1
Árabe Unido	2–0	—	3–0	2–1	1–5	2–0	2–1	1–0	3–0	4–1
Atl. Veragüense	1–3	0–2	—	0–2	1–2	2–0	0–6	1–2	2–1	1–0
Colón River	0–2	1–1	1–1	—	2–1	5–1	3–6	0–5	2–1	0–5
Chorrillo	1–0	0–0	2–0	2–0	—	1–0	1–0	2–2	2–1	1–0
Pan de Azúcar	3–4	1–3	1–1	1–1	0–6	—	1–1	1–2	1–5	0–0
Plaza Amador	3–1	1–1	n/p (Note: Plaza Amador vs Atlético Veragüense was not played due to irrelevance)	2–1	4–1	4–1	—	1–0	1–1	0–0
San Francisco	3–2	1–1	4–1	3–0	1–3	3–0	3–0	—	3–0	0–2
Sporting Coclé	1–2	1–3	2–0	2–1	2–3	2–0	0–0	0–3	—	1–5
Tauro	2–0	1–0	3–2	3–0	2–0	7–0	2–0	2–0	0–0	—

Legend: Blue = home team win; Yellow = draw; Red = away team win.

=== Final round ===
Semifinals (agg)
San Francisco	2
Tauro	1
Árabe Unido	4
El Chorrilo	3

Final
San Francisco	4
Árabe Unido	6

==== Semifinals 1st leg ====
October 24, 2004

San Francisco	1-1	Tauro
Rene Mendieta Jr.		Ricardo Phillips

Estadio Agustín Sánchez

October 24, 2004

El Chorrillo	0-1	Árabe Unido
		Orlando Rodríguez

Estadio Municipal de Balboa

==== Semifinals 2nd leg ====
October 28, 2004

Tauro	0-1	San Francisco
		José Luis Garcés

Campo de Deportes Giancarlo Gronchi

October 27, 2004

Árabe Unido	3-3	El Chorrillo
John Wilson; Orlando Rodríguez (2)		Ricardo Paschall; Leonardo Ricardo; Anel Canales

Estadio Armando Dely Valdés

==== Final 1st leg ====
October 31, 2004

San Francisco	1-1	Árabe Unido
José Luis Garcés		Orlando Rodríguez

Estadio Agustín Sánchez

=== Final 2nd leg ===
November 7, 2004

Árabe Unido	5-3	San Francisco
Amílcar Henríquez; Orlando Rodríguez (2); Alberto Cerezo (2)		Omar Hidalgo (2); Victor Rene Mendieta Jr.

Estadio Armando Dely Valdés

Clausura 2004 champion
Árabe Unido

== Grand final ==
Cancelled as Árabe Unido won both tournaments.

ANAPROF 2004 champion
Árabe Unido
3rd title

== Relegation table ==
Pos	Team	Pld	W	D	L	GF	GA	GD	Pts	Relegation
1	Árabe Unido	36	26	5	5	63	30	+33	83	
2	Tauro	36	21	6	9	61	22	+39	69	
3	San Francisco	36	20	7	9	70	31	+39	67	
4	El Chorrillo	36	19	10	7	58	51	+7	67	
5	Plaza Amador	35	18	8	9	59	33	+26	62	
6	Alianza	36	12	6	18	38	53	−15	42	
7	Atlético Veragüense	35	10	7	18	38	52	−14	37	
8	Sporting Coclé	36	9	9	18	42	60	−18	36	
9	Colón River	36	7	7	22	41	78	−37	28	
10	Pan de Azúcar	36	1	7	28	22	92	−70	10	Relegated to Primera A.

== Local derby statistics ==
El Super Clasico Nacional - Tauro v Plaza Amador

March 5, 2004

Plaza Amador	0–0	Tauro

Balboa

April 21, 2004

Tauro	0–2	Plaza Amador

Giancarlo Gronchi

May 16, 2004

Plaza Amador	3–1	Tauro
Alejandro Dawson (2); Alfredo Hernandez		Pablo Romero

Rommel Fernández

May 20, 2004

Tauro	1–0	Plaza Amador
Eric Martinez

Giancarlo Gronchi

July 25, 2004

Tauro	2–0	Plaza Amador

Giancarlo Gronchi

September 3, 2004

Plaza Amador	0–0	Tauro

Balboa

Clasico del Pueblo - Plaza Amador v Chorillo

February 18, 2004

El Chorrillo	1–0	Plaza Amador

Balboa

April 7, 2004

Plaza Amador	1–1	El Chorrillo

Balboa

July 28, 2004

El Chorrillo	1–0	Plaza Amador

Balboa

September 12, 2004

Plaza Amador	4–1	El Chorrillo

Balboa
