= Juan Pérez (footballer, born 1980) =

Panamanian footballer

Personal information
- Full name: Juan de Dios Pérez Quijada
- Date of birth: January 1, 1980 (age 46)
- Place of birth: Panama City, Panama
- Height: 1.85 m (6 ft 1 in)
- Position: Defensive midfielder

Team information
- Current team: Tauro
- Number: 12

Senior career*
Years	Team	Apps	(Gls)
2001	Panama Viejo	11	(2)
2002–2004	Tauro	33	(4)
2005	Sporting '89	15	(0)
2006–2007	Tauro	44	(3)
2008–2009	Juventude	60	(1)
2009–	Tauro	148	(8)

International career^{‡}
2007–2013	Panama	38	(0)
- * Club domestic league appearances and goals as of 25 February 2016 ‡ National team caps and goals as of 11 July 2015

Juan de Dios Pérez Quijada (born 1 January 1980) is a Panamanian footballer who plays as a midfielder for Tauro.

== Club career ==
After starting his career at local side Panama Viejo, Pérez almost spent the rest of his career at Tauro except for a short spell at Sporting '89 and in Brazil with Juventude whom he joined in 2008.

== International career ==
Pérez made his debut for Panama in a January 2007 friendly match against Trinidad and Tobago and has earned a total of 39 caps including an unofficial match against Guyana in 2010, scoring no goals. He represented his country in 5 FIFA World Cup qualification matches and played at the 2007 and 2013 CONCACAF Gold Cups.

His final international was a July 2013 CONCACAF Gold Cup match against Canada.

== Honors ==
Panamá Viejo

- ANAPROF: 2000–01

Tauro

- ANAPROF: 2003 (A), 2003 (C), 2006 (C), 2007 (A), 2010 (A)

Panama

- CONCACAF Gold Cup runner-up: 2013
