= 2000–01 ANAPROF =

ANAPROF
- Season: 2000–01
- Champions: Panamá Viejo FC
- Relegated: -
- -: -

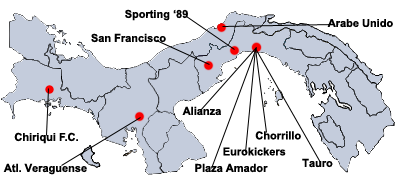
ANAPROF 2000-01 team distribution

ANAPROF 2000–01 is the 2000-2001 season of the Panamanian football league, ANAPROF. The season started on July 28, 2000 and finalized on February 2, 2001 when Panama Viejo was crowned champions after defeating Tauro 4-3.

== Teams ==
Club	City	Stadium
Alianza F.C.	Panama City	Estadio Rommel Fernández
Deportivo Árabe Unido	Colón	Estadio Mariano Bula
Atlético Nacional	Panama City	Estadio Agustín Sánchez
Chiriquí F.C.	David	Estadio San Cristóbal
Eurokickers F.C.	Panama City	Estadio Javier Cruz
Panama Viejo F.C.	Panama City	Estadio Rommel Fernández
Plaza Amador	Panama City	Estadio Rommel Fernández
San Francisco F.C.	La Chorrera	Estadio Agustín Sánchez
Sporting '89	San Miguelito	Estadio Rommel Fernández; Estadio Javier Cruz
Tauro F.C.	Panama City	Estadio Rommel Fernández

== Standings ==
Pos	Team	Pld	W	D	L	GF	GA	GD	Pts	Qualification or relegation
1	Árabe Unido	18	10	5	3	33	17	+16	35	Qualified to the final round
2	Panama Viejo	18	10	5	3	37	24	+13	35	Qualified to the final round
3	Tauro	18	10	4	4	42	25	+17	34	Qualified to the final round
4	San Francisco	18	7	7	4	26	23	+3	28	Qualified to the final round
5	Atlético Nacional	18	6	6	6	26	24	+2	24	Qualified to the final round
6	Alianza	18	6	5	7	19	23	−4	23	Qualified to the final round
7	Plaza Amador	18	6	4	8	23	22	+1	22	
8	Sporting '89	18	4	5	9	23	24	−1	17	
9	Chiriquí	18	4	5	9	19	40	−21	17	
10	Eurokickers	18	2	4	12	26	47	−21	10	Relegated to Primera A

== Results table ==
- Please note that the home teams are read down the left hand side while the away teams are indicated along the top.

Home \ Away	ALI	ÁRA	ATL	CHI	EUR	PAN	PLA	SAN	SPO	TAU
Alianza	—	1–0	1–5	3–2	1–0	1–2	1–0	1–1	0–2	2–2
Árabe Unido	0–0	—	0–1	2–0	4–0	1–0	2–0	1–1	1–1	1–1
Atl. Nacional	1–0	1–3	—	2–0	2–0	0–3	2–0	2–4	0–1	3–4
Chiriquí	2–1	0–4	3–3	—	3–2	1–1	1–0	2–3	2–1	0–6
Eurokickers	1–3	1–2	1–1	3–3	—	1–2	0–3	2–4	3–2	4–3
Panama Viejo	2–1	2–1	1–1	2–2	2–0	—	2–1	1–1	2–0	0–2
Plaza Amador	1–1	1–3	2–1	3–0	7–2	1–1	—	0–0	2–1	1–0
San Francisco	0–1	1–2	1–1	0–0	2–2	2–0	2–1	—	3–1	0–3
Sporting	0–0	1–2	0–0	3–1	2–2	0–1	1–1	1–0	—	3–2
Tauro	2–1	4–4	0–0	1–0	2–1	1–3	2–1	3–1	4–0	—

Legend: Blue = home team win; Yellow = draw; Red = away team win.

== Final round ==
=== Hexagonal ===
Team	Pld	W	D	L	GF	GA	GD	Pts	Qualification	TAU	PAN	ALI	SAN	DAU	ATL
Tauro	5	3	1	1	11	7	+4	10	Qualified for the Semifinals		3–2			3–1	2–3
Panama Viejo	5	2	1	2	8	7	+1	7	Qualified for the Semifinals				1–0	1–1	3–1
Alianza	5	1	4	0	6	5	+1	7	Qualified for the Semifinals	1–1	2–1			0–0	
San Francisco	5	2	1	2	4	5	−1	7	Qualified for the Semifinals	0–2		1–1			1–0
Árabe Unido	5	1	2	2	4	6	−2	5					1–2		
Atlético Nacional	5	1	1	3	6	9	−3	4				2–2		0–1	

=== Semifinals ===
Semifinals (agg)
Tauro	5
San Francisco	3
Panama Viejo	6
Alianza	3

Final
Tauro	3
Panama Viejo	4

==== 1st leg ====
January 21, 2001

Alianza	2-3	Panama Viejo
René Mendieta 76'; Roberto Brown 90'		Anel Canales 11'; Ricardo Phillips 33'; Blas Pérez 72'

Estadio Rommel Fernández

January 24, 2001

San Francisco	0-2	Tauro
		Luis Parra

Estadio Rommel Fernández

==== 2nd leg ====
January 26, 2001

Panama Viejo	3-1	Alianza
Marco Aparicio 32' 51'; Blas Pérez 74'		Ricardo Palomino 34'

Estadio Rommel Fernández

January 28, 2001

Tauro	3-2	San Francisco
Luis Parra 45' (pen.); Frank Lozada (OG) 58'; Rubén Guevara 61'		Antonio Ortega 2'; Jose Reyes

Estadio Agustín Sánchez

==== Final ====
February 4, 2001

Tauro	3-4 (a.e.t.)	Panama Viejo
Luis Parra 27' 66' (pen.); Mario Méndez 72'		Erick Martinez 36' 66'; Ricardo Phillips 45'; Rodney Ramos 100' (pen.)

Estadio Rommel Fernández

ANAPROF 2000–01 champion
Panama Viejo
1st title

=== Top goal scorers ===
Position	Player	Scored for	Goals
1	(Panama) Luis Parra	Tauro	17
2	(Panama) Alberto Cerezo	Árabe Unido	16
3	(Panama) José Luis Garcés	San Francisco	11
-	(Panama) Anel Canales	Panama Viejo	11
-	(Panama) Luis Tejada	Tauro	11
6	(Panama) Jose Ardines	Eurokickers	10
7	(Panama) Wilson Zuñiga	Atlético Nacional	9
-	(Panama) Omar Navarro	Chiriquí	9
-	(Panama) Ricardo Phillips	Panama Viejo	9

== Local derby statistics ==
El Super Clasico Nacional - Tauro v Plaza Amador

July 28, 2000

Plaza Amador	1–0	Tauro
Alfredo Hernández

Rommel Fernández

October 24, 2000

Tauro	2–1	Plaza Amador
Luis Plúa 54'; Rubén Guevara 74'		Alfredo Hernández 6'

Rommel Fernández
