= 2005 ANAPROF =

ANAPROF
- Season: 2005
- Champions: CD Plaza Amador; Apertura; San Francisco FC; Clausura
- Relegated: -
- -: -

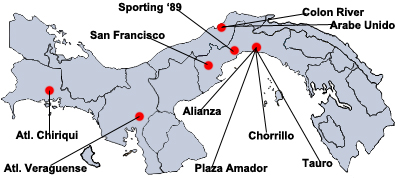
ANAPROF 2005 team distribution

ANAPROF 2005 is the 2005 season of the Panamanian football (soccer) league, ANAPROF. The season started on February 11, 2005 with the "Torneo Apertura 2005" and finalized on November 12, 2005 with the Torneo Clausura 2005. The Apertura champion was Plaza Amador and the Clausura champion was San Francisco, on November 22, 2005 the ANAPROF 2005 final was played and Plaza Amador was crowned champion over San Francisco.

== Change for 2005 ==
- Sporting Cocle were renamed Sporting '89 before the start of this season.
- Colón River F.C. were excluded after 17 matches of the Apertura championship and further excluded from the Clausura championship.

== Teams ==
Club	City	Stadium
Alianza F.C.	Panama City	Estadio Camping Resort
Árabe Unido	Colón	Estadio Armando Dely Valdés
Atlético Chiriquí	David	Estadio San Cristóbal
Atlético Veragüense	Santiago	Estadio Aristocles Castillo
Colón River F.C.	Colón	Estadio Armando Dely Valdés
El Chorrillo F.C.	Panama City	Estadio Municipal de Balboa
Plaza Amador	Panama City	Estadio Rommel Fernández
San Francisco F.C.	La Chorrera	Estadio Agustín Sánchez
Sporting '89	San Miguelito	Campo de Deportes Giancarlo Gronchi
Tauro F.C.	Panama City	Campo de Deportes Giancarlo Gronchi

== Apertura 2005 ==
=== Standings ===
Pos	Team	Pld	W	D	L	GF	GA	GD	Pts	Qualification
1	Tauro	18	11	5	2	22	7	+15	38	Qualified to the final round
2	San Francisco	18	11	4	3	38	15	+23	37	Qualified to the final round
3	Árabe Unido	18	11	4	3	31	11	+20	37	Qualified to the final round
4	Plaza Amador	18	8	6	4	28	19	+9	30	Qualified to the final round
5	El Chorrillo	18	7	6	5	26	18	+8	27	
6	Alianza	18	5	6	7	16	20	−4	21	
7	Atlético Chiriquí	18	5	6	7	15	24	−9	21	
8	Sporting '89	18	4	5	9	13	21	−8	17	
9	Atlético Veragüense	18	3	4	11	9	30	−21	13	
10	Colón River	18	1	2	15	14	47	−33	5 (Note: Colón River were excluded after 17 were played)	

=== Results table ===
Home \ Away	ALI	ÁRA	ACH	AVE	COL	CHO	PLA	SAN	SPO	TAU
Alianza	—	1–0	0–1	3–0	2–1	1–1	2–2	2–3	1–1	0–2
Árabe Unido	0–0	—	1–1	3–0	3–0	1–0	4–0	0–2	5–1	1–1
Atl. Chiriquí	1–1	1–3	—	1–1	2–1	0–3	1–0	0–0	0–0	0–1
Atl. Veragüense	0–1	0–1	1–0	—	1–2	0–2	1–1	1–0	0–2	0–2
Colón River	0–0	0–2	1–3	1–2	—	1–4	2–4	2–4	1–1	0–1
Chorrillo	0–1	0–2	2–1	2–1	6–0	—	1–3	0–0	2–0	1–1
Plaza Amador	3–1	1–1	5–1	2–0	2–1	0–0	—	1–1	2–1	0–1
San Francisco	2–0	0–2	1–1	7–1	5–1	5–1	1–0	—	3–1	0–1
Sporting	2–0	0–1	0–1	0–0	2–0 (Note: Sporting '89 vs Colón River was not played and was awarded a 2-0 win for Sporting.)	1–1	0–2	0–1	—	0–1
Tauro	1–0	3–1	3–0	0–0	3–0	0–0	0–0	1–3	0–1	—

Legend: Blue = home team win; Yellow = draw; Red = away team win.

=== Final round ===
Semifinals (agg)
Plaza Amador	1
Tauro	0
Árabe Unido	4
San Francisco	2

Final
Plaza Amador	3
Árabe Unido	1

==== Semifinals 1st leg ====
May 11, 2005

Plaza Amador	1-0	Tauro

Estadio Rommel Fernández

May 11, 2005

Arabe Unido	2-1	San Francisco

Estadio Armando Dely Valdés

==== Semifinals 2nd leg ====
May 15, 2005

San Francisco	1-2	Árabe Unido

Estadio Agustín Sánchez

May 15, 2005

Tauro	0-0	Plaza Amador

Campo de Deportes Giancarlo Gronchi

==== Final ====
May 21, 2005

Plaza Amador	3-1	Árabe Unido
Engie Mitre; Cesar Aguilar; José Justavino		Juan Carlos Riley (OG)

Estadio Rommel Fernández

Apertura 2005 champion
Plaza Amador

=== Top goal scorer ===
Position	Player	Scored for	Goals
1	(Panama) José Luis Garcés	San Francisco	11

== Clausura 2005 ==
=== Standings ===
Pos	Team	Pld	W	D	L	GF	GA	GD	Pts	Qualification
1	Atlético Veragüense	16	9	6	1	29	15	+14	33	Qualified to the final round
2	San Francisco	16	9	4	3	34	21	+13	31	Qualified to the final round
3	Tauro	16	8	5	3	35	22	+13	29	Qualified to the final round
4	Alianza	16	6	4	6	25	26	−1	22	Qualified to the final round
5	Árabe Unido	16	4	7	5	18	20	−2	19	
6	Atlético Chiriquí	16	4	5	7	20	25	−5	17	
7	El Chorrillo	16	4	5	7	19	24	−5	17	
8	Sporting '89	16	3	6	7	17	26	−9	15	
9	Plaza Amador	16	2	4	10	17	35	−18	10	
0	Colón River	0	0	0	0	0	0	0	0 (Note: Excluded from the Clausura championship)	

=== Results table ===
Home \ Away	ALI	ÁRA	ACH	AVE	COL	CHO	PLA	SAN	SPO	TAU
Alianza	—	1–1	5–4	0–0	bye	2–2	2–2	1–3	1–0	0–2
Árabe Unido	2–1	—	0–1	1–1	bye	0–0	3–0	1–2	1–1	1–0
Atl. Chiriquí	2–3	1–0	—	1–2	bye	0–0	1–1	1–5	3–0	1–1
Atl. Veragüense	1–0	1–1	2–1	—	bye	1–0	2–1	3–1	5–2	3–4
Colón River	bye	bye	bye	bye	—	bye	bye	bye	bye	bye
Chorrillo	2–0	3–3	0–2	0–2	bye	—	2–1	0–3	0–0	1–3
Plaza Amador	1–5	1–3	1–1	1–1	bye	2–1	—	0–1	1–2	2–3
San Francisco	0–1	1–0	2–0	1–1	bye	4–3	1–2	—	2–2	3–3
Sporting	2–0	0–0	0–0	0–3	bye	1–3	4–0	2–4	—	0–2
Tauro	2–3	6–1	3–1	1–1	bye	0–2	3–1	1–1	1–1	—

Legend: Blue = home team win; Yellow = draw; Red = away team win.

=== Final round ===
Semifinals (agg)
Tauro	1
San Francisco	4
Alianza	1
Atlético Veragüense	3

Final
San Francisco	2
Atlético Veragüense	0

==== Semifinals 1st leg ====
October 30, 2005

Tauro	1-3	San Francisco

Campo de Deportes Giancarlo Gronchi

October 30, 2005

Alianza	1-1	Atlético Veragüense

Estadio Camping Resort

==== Semifinals 2nd leg ====
November 5, 2005

Atlético Veragüense	2-1	Alianza

Estadio Aristocles Castillo

November 6, 2005

San Francisco	1-0	Tauro

Estadio Agustín Sánchez

=== Final ===
November 12, 2005

San Francisco	2-0	Atlético Veragüense
Manuel Torres; José Luis Garcés

Estadio Rommel Fernández

Clausura 2005 champion
San Francisco

- [*] The game finished After Extra Time.

== Grand final ==
Club	Champion
Plaza Amador	ANAPROF 2005 Apertura Champion
San Francisco	ANAPROF 2005 Clausura Champion

=== Final ===
November 2005

Plaza Amador	2-0	San Francisco
Angel Lombardo; José Justavino

Estadio Rommel Fernández

ANAPROF 2005 champion
Plaza Amador
5th title

- Plaza Amador champions 2005 in spite of a negative season record with respect to wins-losses and goals scored-conceded.

=== Top goal scorer ===
Position	Player	Scored for	Goals
1	(Panama) José Luis Garcés	San Francisco	13

== Relegation table ==
Pos	Team	Pld	W	D	L	GF	GA	GD	Pts	Relegation
1	San Francisco	34	20	8	6	72	36	+36	68	
2	Tauro	34	19	10	5	57	29	+28	67	
3	Árabe Unido	34	15	11	8	49	31	+18	56	
4	Atlético Veragüense	34	12	10	12	38	45	−7	46	
5	El Chorrillo	34	11	11	12	45	42	+3	44	
6	Alianza	34	11	10	13	41	46	−5	43	
7	Plaza Amador	34	10	10	14	45	54	−9	40	
8	Atlético Chiriquí	34	9	11	14	35	49	−14	38	
9	Sporting '89	34	7	11	16	30	47	−17	32	Playing relegation playoff
10	Colón River	18	1	2	15	14	47	−33	5 (Note: Excluded after the Apertura championship.)	Relegated to Primera A

=== Relegation playoff ===
Team 1	Agg.	Team 2	1st leg	2nd leg
Sporting '89	3–1	Atalanta	1-0	2-1

Sporting '89 remain in ANAPROF

== Local derby statistics ==
El Super Clasico Nacional - Tauro v Plaza Amador

March 5, 2005

Plaza Amador	0–1	Tauro

Rommel Fernández

April 30, 2005

Tauro	0–0	Plaza Amador

Giancarlo Gronchi

July 15, 2005

Plaza Amador	2–3	Tauro

Rommel Fernández

September 14, 2005

Tauro	3–1	Plaza Amador

Giancarlo Gronchi

Clasico del Pueblo - Plaza Amador v Chorillo

February 16, 2005

Chorrillo	1–3	Plaza Amador

Balboa

April 9, 2005

Plaza Amador	0–0	Chorrillo

Rommel Fernández

September 11, 2005

Chorrillo	2–1	Plaza Amador

Balboa

October 26, 2005

Plaza Amador	2–1	Chorrillo

Rommel Fernández

Derbi Interiorano - Atlético Chiriquí v Atlético Veragüense

February 12, 2005

Atlético Chiriquí	1–1	Atlético Veragüense

San Cristobal

April 2, 2005

Atlético Veragüense	1–0	Atlético Chiriquí

Toco Castillo

September 10, 2005

Atlético Veragüense	2–1	Atlético Chiriquí

Toco Castillo

October 26, 2005

Atlético Chiriquí	1–2	Atlético Veragüense

San Cristobal
