= Brunet Hay =

Panamanian footballer (born 1984)

Brunette Hay
Personal information
- Full name: Brunette Francisco Hay Pino
- Date of birth: 7 September 1984 (age 42)
- Place of birth: Panama City, Panama
- Height: 1.92 m (6 ft 3 1/2 in)
- Position: Striker

Team information
- Current team: Platense
- Number: 9

Senior career*
Years	Team	Apps	(Gls)
2003	Sporting San Miguelito	39	(19)
2003	Árabe Unido	17	(6)
2004–2005	Sporting San Miguelito	35	(12)
2005	Racing CM	17	(11)
2006	Academia		
2006–2008	Tauro	57	(22)
2009	San Francisco	17	(9)
2009	→ Indep. Medellín (loan)	3	(2)
2010	→ Cortuluá (loan)	11	(1)
2011–2012	Sporting San Miguelito	18	(9)
2011	→ Örebro (loan)	1	(0)
2012	Pérez Zeledón	23	(8)
2013	Nacional Potosí	9	(3)
2013–2014	Pérez Zeledón	37	(14)
2014	Herediano	10	(0)
2015	→ Belén (loan)	14	(1)
2016–	Platense	52	(16)
- * Club domestic league appearances and goals as of 15 December 2017 ‡ National team caps and goals as of 31 July 2006

Brunette Francisco Hay Pino (born 7 September 1984) is a football striker who currently plays for Platense in the Honduran Liga Nacional.

== Club career ==
A tall striker, Hay represented a few different local teams and had a stint in Uruguayan football with Racing Club de Montevideo. He moved to Colombia to play alongside compatriot Clive Trotman at Academia in January 2006 and he later signed for San Francisco from Tauro in April 2009. In July 2009, Hay joined Colombian club Independiente Medellín on loan and in July 2010 he moved to Cortuluá for another 6-month loan alongside compatriot Alejandro Vélez. He returned to Sporting SM in December 2010. In August 2011 he went for a trial to and in September 2011 he made his debut in the Swedish league with Örebro.

=== Costa Rica ===
In summer 2012, he moved abroad again to play for Costa Rican club Pérez Zeledón but he left them for Bolivian side Nacional Potosí after scoring 8 goals in 22 games. He returned to Pérez Zeledón in summer 2013, alongside fellow Panamanian Armando Polo. In May 2014, he moved on to Costa Rican giants Herediano, where he was joined by compatriot Gabriel Enrique Gómez. Herediano sent him on loan to Belén in January 2015.

After he was released, Hay was expected to sign with Guatemalan side Universidad SC, but the move did not materialize.
