= Óscar McFarlane =

Panamanian footballer (born 1980)

Personal information
- Full name: Óscar McFarlane Ortega
- Date of birth: 29 November 1980 (age 45)
- Place of birth: Panama City, Panama
- Height: 1.75 m (5 ft 9 in)
- Position: Goalkeeper

Team information
- Current team: Tauro
- Number: 54

Senior career*
| Years | Team | Apps | (Gls) |
| 1996–1997 | Ejecutivo Jr. | | (0) |
| 1998–1999 | Plaza Amador | | (0) |
| 2000–2002 | Panama Viejo | 50 | (7) |
| 2003–2008 | Tauro | 177 | (11) |
| 2008 | Sporting San Miguelito | 16 | (0) |
| 2009 | CNI | 18 | (0) |
| 2010 | Chorrillo | 7 | (0) |
| 2011–2012 | Sporting San Miguelito | 19 | (0) |
| 2012–2014 | Río Abajo | 40 | (0) |
| 2014–2015 | Pérez Zeledón | 6 | (0) |
| 2015–2016 | San Francisco | 7 | (0) |
| 2016 – | Tauro F.C. | 29 | (0) |

International career^{‡}
| 2001–14 | Panama | 37 | (0) |
- * Club domestic league appearances and goals as of May 20, 2015 ‡ National team caps and goals as of March 31, 2015

Óscar Emilio McFarlane Ortega (born 29 November 1980) is a Panamanian football goalkeeper for the San Francisco of the LPF.

== Club career ==
Nicknamed La Bruja, McFarlane played for several local clubs before embarking on a lengthy spell at Tauro. He moved abroad to play for Peruvian side CNI in December 2008 from Sporting San Miguelito and in June 2014 he joined Costa Rican side Pérez Zeledón. He returned to Panama in March 2015 to play for San Francisco but regulations of the LPF delayed his debut for the club since his license was not released in time by Pérez Zeledón.

== International career ==
He has been a member of all the youth processes of the Panama national team.

McFarlane made his senior debut for Panama in an April 2001 friendly match against Haiti and has, as of 10 June 2015, earned a total of 26 caps, scoring no goals. He represented his country at the 2007 UNCAF Nations Cup.

On May 31, 2014, after a 5-year absence from the national football team, he started at goalkeeper in the 1–1 tie against Serbia.

== Murder allegations and jail ==
In March 2011, McFarlane was jailed and accused for shooting a man during a fight in San Miguelito. Three years earlier, he had been arrested once for illegal possession of weapons. In November 2012, he was declared innocent by the Second Superior Court after spending 20 months in the El Renacer jail.

== Honors ==
Panama Viejo

- ANAPROF: 2001

Tauro

- ANAPROF: 2003, 2007

Panama

- CONCACAF Gold Cup runner-up: 2005
- UNCAF Nations Cup Runner-Up (1): 2007

Individual

- Chosen three times as best goalkeeper of ANAPROF (2001, 2003, 2006)
- Chosen best player of ANAPROF in 2006
