= Jean McLean (footballer) =

Panamanian footballer (born 1984)

Jean Alberto McLean
Personal information
- Full name: Jean Alberto McLean Marenco
- Date of birth: January 16, 1984 (age 42)
- Place of birth: Panama City, Panama
- Height: 1.73 m (5 ft 8 in)
- Position: Midfielder

Team information
- Current team: S.D. Atletico Nacional

Senior career*
Years	Team	Apps	(Gls)
2003–2007	Plaza Amador	70	(8)
2008–09	Tauro	117	(9)
2010	→ América Cali (loan)	36	(0)
2010–15	Tauro	117	(0)
2014–15	SUNTRACS	0	(0)
2015–16	Rio Abajo	0	(0)
2015–17	Alianza	28	(0)
2016–17	Plaza Amador	9	(0)
2017–	Atletico Nacional	0	(0)

International career^{‡}
2007–2010	Panama	4	(0)
- * Club domestic league appearances and goals as of May 22, 2009 ‡ National team caps and goals as of October 20, 2008

Jean Alberto McLean Marenco (born 16 January 1984) is a Panamanian professional football midfielder playing in Panama for Panamanian Second Division team SUNTRACS.

== Club career ==
He won the 2005 ANAPROF league title with Plaza Amador in November 2005. In 2007, he moved to Tauro.

In January 2010 McLean joined Colombian giants América Cali on a one year-loan alongside compatriot Edwin Aguilar. He however already returned in April 2010 after the club failed to pay his wages.

== International career ==
McLean played at the 2003 FIFA World Youth Championship in the United Arab Emirates.

He made his senior debut for Panama in an August 2007 friendly match against Guatemala and has earned a total of 4 caps, scoring no goals.

His final international was an October 2010 friendly match against Cuba.

== Honours ==
- Liga Panameña de Fútbol (1): 2007 (A)
