= Alejandro Vélez =

Panamanian footballer (born 1988)

Personal information
- Full name: Alejandro Velez Williams
- Date of birth: 3 March 1988 (age 38)
- Place of birth: Colón, Panama
- Height: 1.81 m (5 ft 11 1/2 in)
- Position: Defensive midfielder

Team information
- Current team: Tauro
- Number: 5

Senior career*
| Years | Team | Apps | (Gls) |
| 2006–2011 | Árabe Unido | 88 | (8) |
| 2007 | → Santacruceña (loan) | 16 | (1) |
| 2010 | → Cortuluá (loan) | 11 | (1) |
| 2012 | Atlético Huila | 30 | (4) |
| 2013 | Plaza Amador | 12 | (3) |
| 2013 | Árabe Unido | 13 | (0) |
| 2014 | Río Abajo | 15 | (1) |
| 2014– | Tauro | 31 | (4) |

International career^{‡}
| 2010– | Panama | 4 | (0) |
- * Club domestic league appearances and goals as of 21 April 2013 ‡ National team caps and goals as of 21 April 2013

Alejandro Vélez Williams (born 3 March 1988) is a Panamanian football defender who currently plays for Tauro.

== Club career ==
Nicknamed La Bomba, Vélez started his career at local side Árabe Unido and was loaned out with compatriot Amílcar Henríquez to Costa Rican club Santacruceña in summer 2007 and alongside fellow Panamanian Brunet Hay to Colombian team Cortuluá in summer 2010.

In January 2013, he joined Plaza Amador from Colombian outfit Atlético Huila, for who he had signed a year earlier, only to return to Árabe Unido in summer 2013. In July 2014 he moved to Tauro after a season at Río Abajo.

== International career ==
Vélez made his international debut on 20 January 2010, in a friendly match against Chile. He was sent off. He has, as of August 2015, earned a total of 4 caps, scoring no goals.

== Honors ==
=== Club ===
- Liga Panameña de Fútbol (1): 2008 (C)
- Liga Panameña de Fútbol: Apertura 2009 II
