= Jean McLean =

Jean McLean may refer to:

- Jean McLean (footballer)
- Jean McLean (politician)
