= Clive Trotman =

Panamanian football defender (born 1983)

Personal information
- Full name: Clive Trotman
- Date of birth: 29 April 1983 (age 43)
- Place of birth: Colón, Panama
- Height: 1.92 m (6 ft 4 in)
- Position: Central defender

Senior career*
Years	Team	Apps	(Gls)
2000–2003	Sporting'89	66	(4)
2004–2005	Árabe Unido	45	(1)
2005	Sporting'89	17	(0)
2006	Academia	19	(1)
2006–2010	Atlético Chiriquí	104	(12)
2010–2011	→ Chorrillo(loan)	0	(0)
- * Club domestic league appearances and goals as of 18 June 2007 ‡ National team caps and goals as of 18 June 2007

Clive Trotman (born 29 April 1983) is a Panamanian football defender.

== Club career ==
After spending several seasons in the local league, Trottman moved abroad to play alongside compatriot Brunet Hay at Colombian side Academia in January 2006. Trottman joined Chorrillo from Atlético Chiriquí in summer 2010.

== International career ==
2003 - Sub20 - Played sub20 Qualifying for the World United Arab Emirates in 2003. 2003 - Junior World Cup 2003 (UAE) 2004/2005 - Choosing Absolute, Qualifying for the World Cup Germany 2006.

He was called up for a senior team game against Cuba in May 2004.
