= Víctor René Mendieta (footballer, born 1961) =

Panamanian footballer

Personal information
- Full name: Víctor René Mendieta Ocampo
- Date of birth: June 16, 1961 (age 65)
- Place of birth: Panama City, Panama
- Height: 1.82 m (6 ft 0 in)
- Position: Striker

Senior career*
Years	Team	Apps	(Gls)
1978–1983	Plaza Amador		
1983–1986	Tauro		
1986–1987	Cojutepeque		
1988–1991	UA Tamaulipas	127	(41)
1992–1993	Universidad Guadalajara	30	(7)
1993–1995	Tampico Madero	32	(11)
1995–1996	UA Tamaulipas		
1995	Green Cross	3	(0)
1997	Real España		
1998–1999	Tauro		
1999–2000	Plaza Amador		(15)
2000–2001	Alianza		

International career^{‡}
1980–2000	Panama	80	(11)

Managerial career
- 2004–2005: Panama U-20
- 2006: Panama
- 2009: Alianza
- 2010–2011: Chepo
- 2014: CA Independiente
- * Club domestic league appearances and goals ‡ National team caps and goals as of 15 August 2015

Víctor René Mendieta Ocampo (born 16 June 1961) is a Panamanian retired football forward.

== Club career ==
Mendieta played for local sides Plaza Amador, Sporting'89 and Tauro. He also had spells abroad in El Salvador, Ecuador, Honduras and, most notably, in Mexico during the 1994-95 season.

He announced his retirement in January 2000 after scoring 15 goals for Plaza Amador, but returned to play for Alianza and eventually retired in November 2001 after playing for Alianza against San Francisco, aged 40. According to the IFFHS, Mendieta scored 222 goals in 375 matches between 1978 and 1997.

== International career ==
Mendieta made his debut for Panama in an October 1980 FIFA World Cup qualification match against El Salvador and has played 80 times for the national team including unofficial matches during the 1980s and early 1990s. He represented his country in 16 FIFA World Cup qualification matches and played at the 1993 CONCACAF Gold Cup.

His final international was a September 2000 FIFA World Cup qualification match against Mexico.

== Managerial career ==
Mendieta managed the Panama national under-20 football team at the FIFA U-20 World Cup in the Netherlands and he was named interim coach of the senior squad in 2006.

In 2009, he took charge of his former club Alianza and in May 2014 he was appointed manager of Independiente de La Chorrera, but was dismissed in October 2014.

== Personal life ==
Mendieta is the father of former Panamanian international footballer Víctor René Mendieta.

=== International goals ===
Scores and results list Panama's goal tally first.

#	Date	Venue	Opponent	Score	Result	Competition
1	5 October 1980	Estadio Cuscatlán, San Salvador, El Salvador	El Salvador	1–4	4–1	1981 CONCACAF Championship
2	24 March 1984	Estadio Rommel Fernández, Panama City, Panama	Costa Rica	1–0	1–1	Friendly match
3	29 May 1984	Estadio Cuscatlán, San Salvador, El Salvador	El Salvador	1–2	2–1	Friendly match
4	17 July 1988	Estadio Alejandro Morera Soto, Alajuela, Costa Rica	Costa Rica	1–0	1–1	1989 CONCACAF Championship
5	16 August 1992	Estadio Rommel Fernández, Panama City, Panama	Costa Rica	1–0	1–0	1994 FIFA World Cup qualification (CONCACAF)
6	23 August 1992	Estadio Nacional de Costa Rica (1924), San José, Costa Rica	Costa Rica	1–5	5–1	1994 FIFA World Cup qualification (CONCACAF)
7	17 July 1993	Cotton Bowl (stadium), Dallas, United States	Jamaica	1–0	1–1	1993 CONCACAF Gold Cup
8	9 June 1996	Estadio Rommel Fernández, Panama City, Panama	Belize	4–1	4–1	1998 FIFA World Cup qualification (CONCACAF)
9	7 August 1996	Estadio Rommel Fernández, Panama City, Panama	Honduras	1–0	2–1	Friendly match
10	7 August 1996	Estadio Rommel Fernández, Panama City, Panama	Honduras	2–0	2–1	Friendly match
11	15 December 1996	Estadio Rommel Fernández, Panama City, Panama	Cuba	1–0	3–1	1998 FIFA World Cup qualification (CONCACAF)
