= Jaime Jornet =

Spanish footballer

Personal information
- Full name: Jaime Ignacio Jornet Guijarro
- Date of birth: 6 January 1987 (age 39)
- Place of birth: Elda, Spain
- Height: 1.82 m (6 ft 0 in)
- Position: Forward

Youth career
- Alicante
- Hércules

Senior career*
Years	Team	Apps	(Gls)
2006–2007	Monóvar		
2007–2008	Hércules B	?	(1)
2009–2010	Eldense	57	(11)
2010–2012	Jove Español	67	(33)
2012	Elche Ilicitano	3	(1)
2012–2013	Elche	4	(0)
2013	Alcoyano	10	(0)
2013	Jove Español	7	(1)
2013–2014	Yeclano	1	(0)
2014	Ontinyent	19	(1)
2014–2015	Novelda	22	(5)
2015–2016	Crevillente	42	(13)
2016	Huginn	13	(2)
2017	Crevillente	27	(4)
2017–2018	Eldense	32	(4)
2018–2019	Crevillente	20	(9)
2019	Olímpic Xàtiva	10	(6)
- * Club domestic league appearances and goals as of 19 May 2019

Jaime Ignacio Jornet Guijarro (born 6 January 1987) is a Spanish footballer who plays as a forward.

== Club career ==
Jornet was born in Elda, Province of Alicante. A product of local Alicante CF and Hércules CF's youth systems, he made his senior debut with Valencian neighbours CD Eldense. In 2010 he joined FC Jove Español San Vicente, also in the community and the fourth division.

After nearly two seasons of play with Jove, scoring 22 goals in his second, Jornet terminated his contract and signed for Elche CF on 19 April 2012. He was initially assigned to the B-side.

Jornet played the entire 2012 preseason with Elche's main squad, scoring in all games except against UD Almería. This prompted the fans to demand his presence in the first team's roster and, after the injuries of Miguel Linares and Berry Powel, this came to fruition.

On 26 August 2012, Jornet made his debut in the second level, coming off the bench to replace Jordi Xumetra in a 2–1 away win against Hércules. However, on 31 January of the following year, he was released by Elche alongside Ricardo Buitrago; he immediately signed a contract with CD Alcoyano in division three.

In the summer of 2013, Jornet returned to Jove Español and the fourth tier, but left only two months later. Shortly after, he moved to fellow league club Yeclano Deportivo, changing teams again in January of the following year after signing with Ontinyent CF in the third division.

Save for a very brief spell in Iceland with Íþróttafélagið Huginn, Jornet competed in the Spanish lower leagues until his retirement.
