= Colón River F.C. =

Panamanian football team

- Full name: Colón River Plate Futbol Club
- Founded: 1994
- Dissolved: 2005
- Ground: Estadio Armando Dely Valdés; Colón, Panama
- Capacity: 3,000
- League: ANAPROF
Home colours	Away colours

Colón River Plate F.C. (or simply Colón River) was a Panamanian football team founded in 1994 and based on Colón, Panama. In 2005 the team ceased to exist.

== History ==
The team participated in Primera A and two seasons in ANAPROF for the 2004 and 2005 season. Their only honor was a Primera A championship in the 2003 season.

Unfortunately for Colón River in 2005 it was forced to abandon the 2005 season after only one match missing for the Apertura to finish and therefore it ceased to exist.

== Honors ==
- Primera A: 1

2003

- Copa Rommel Fernández: 1

2002
