= Isidoro Hinestroza =

Panamanian footballer (born 1997)

Personal information
- Full name: Isidoro Joamir Hinestroza Hernández
- Date of birth: 11 September 1997 (age 29)
- Place of birth: Panama City, Panama
- Height: 1.75 m (5 ft 9 in)
- Position: Forward

Team information
- Current team: Unión Coclé

Senior career*
Years	Team	Apps	(Gls)
2016–2018	San Francisco	20	(6)
2018–2019	CD Universitario	13	(2)
2019	San Francisco	19	(8)
2019–2020	Vilafranquense	5	(0)
2020–2021	San Francisco	22	(8)
2021–2022	Carabobo	12	(5)
2022–2023	Técnico Universitario	3	(0)
2023	San Francisco	7	(1)
2023–2024	Estudiantes	1	(0)
2024–2025	Plaza Amador	18	(2)
2025–2026	Veraguas United	28	(5)
2026	Tarxien Rainbows	4	(0)
2026–	Unión Coclé	0	(0)

International career^{‡}
2017	Panama U20	5	(1)
- * Club domestic league appearances and goals as of 15 May 2020 ‡ National team caps and goals as of 15 May 2020

Isidoro Joamir Hinestroza Hernández (born 11 September 1997) is a Panamanian footballer who plays as a forward for Panamanian club Unión Coclé.

== Career ==
=== Vilafranquense ===
In July 2019, Hinestroza moved to Portuguese club Vilafranquense. He made his league debut for the club on 14 September 2019, coming on as an 83rd minute substitute for Filipe Oliveira in a 3–0 away defeat to Farense.
