= Anel Canales =

Panamanian footballer (born 1978)

Personal information
- Full name: Anel Alejandro Canales Madrid
- Date of birth: 15 March 1978 (age 48)
- Place of birth: Panama City, Panama
- Height: 1.89 m (6 ft 2 1/2 in)
- Position: Striker

Senior career*
| Years | Team | Apps | (Gls) |
| 1995–1997 | Chorrillo | | (24) |
| 1998–2001 | Panama Viejo | | (35) |
| 2002 | Tauro | | (16) |
| 2003 | Chorrillo | | (7) |
| 2003 | San Francisco | | (12) |
| 2004 | Chorrillo | | (18) |
| 2005 | Once Municipal | | (11) |
| 2006 | Envigado | 8 | (2) |
| 2006–2007 | Alianza | | |
| 2007 | Chorrillo | | (0) |
| 2007 | Técnico Universitario | 0 | (0) |
| 2007 | Chalatenango | 6 | (1) |
| 2008 | Chorrillo | | (3) |
| 2008 | Tauro | | (3) |
| 2009 | Isidro Metapán | 36 | (17) |
| 2010 | Chorrillo | 16 | (1) |
| 2010–2011 | Isidro Metapán | 20 | (7) |
| 2011–2014 | Luis Ángel Firpo | 106 | (54) |

International career^{‡}
| 2001–2009 | Panama | 15 | (2) |
- * Club domestic league appearances and goals as of 19 December 2010 ‡ National team caps and goals as of 6 June 2015

Anel Alejandro Canales Madrid (born 15 March 1978) is a football forward who most recently played for Luis Ángel Firpo of the Second Division of El Salvador.

== Club career ==
A much travelled winger or striker, Canales had spells at several Panamanian sides, most notably with Chorrillo and Tauro.

Nicknamed Anelca, he played in El Salvador for Once Municipal, Alianza, Chalatenango, Isidro Metapán, whom he joined in January 2009, returning for a second spell in May 2010 and Luis Ángel Firpo. In December 2007, he was deemed not eligible to play for Chalatenango after the FEDEFUT disciplinary committee confirmed he played for three different teams in the 2007–2008 season, which is prohibited by FIFA. He played over 200 league games in El Salvador and scored over 100 goals.

He also spent time in Colombia with Envigado alongside compatriots Joel Solanilla and Luis Moreno and in Ecuador with Técnico Universitario for whom he made his debut in August 2007.

A tall striker, Canales was part of a tenth-title winning Salvadoran side Luis Ángel Firpo in 2013, but eventually was relegated with the club in May 2014, the club went down after 32 years of top flight football. He then announced he would return to Panama.

== International career ==
He made his debut for Panama in June 2001 friendly match against Trinidad and Tobago and has earned a total of 15 caps, scoring 2 goals. He represented his country at the 2003 and 2007 UNCAF Nations Cups.

His final international was a June 2009 friendly match against Jamaica.

=== International goals ===
Scores and results list Panama's goal tally first.

| # | Date | Venue | Opponent | Score | Result | Competition |
|---|---|---|---|---|---|---|
| 1 | 11 October 2006 | Hasely Crawford Stadium, Port of Spain, Trinidad and Tobago | Trinidad and Tobago | 1–2 | 1–2 | friendly match |
| 2 | 31 January 2007 | Estadio Rommel Fernández, Panama City, Panama | Trinidad and Tobago | 1–0 | 2–1 | friendly match |

== Honors ==
=== Club ===
- Liga Panameña de Fútbol (1):
  - 2001-02
- Salvadoran Primera División (2):
  - 2009 (C), 2010 (A)

=== Individual ===
- Liga Panameña de Fútbol Top Scorer (2):
  - 2002 (C), 2003 (A)
