= Miguel Mansilla =

Uruguayan footballer (1953-2013)

Personal information
- Full name: Miguel Ángel Mansilla Acuña
- Date of birth: 25 April 1953
- Place of birth: Cerro Largo, Uruguay
- Date of death: 26 June 2013 (aged 60)
- Place of death: Panama City, Panama
- Position: Striker

Senior career*
Years	Team	Apps	(Gls)
1971	Peñarol		
1972	River Plate Montev.		
1972–1977	Chacarita Juniors		
1977–1979	Saprissa	73	(34)
1979–1980	Cuenca		
1980–1981	Municipal Puntarenas	17	(5)

Managerial career
- 1987–1988: Panama
- 1988–1989: Tauro
- 1990: Panama
- 1991–1993: Tauro
- 1993–1994: Bravos Projusa
- 1994–1999: Tauro
- 1999–2000: Panama
- 2004: San Francisco
- 2005–2006: Once Municipal
- 2006–2007: Alianza
- 2007–2008: Tauro
- 2011–2012: Chorrillo
- 2013: SUNTRACS
- * Club domestic league appearances and goals

Miguel Ángel Mansilla Acuña (25 April 1953 – 26 June 2013) was a Uruguayan professional footballer who played as a forward.

== Club career ==
Born in Cerro Largo, Mansilla came through the youth ranks at and made his professional debut for local giants Peñarol in 1971 and also played for River Plate Montevideo before moving abroad to enjoy a lengthy spell at Argentine side Chacarita Juniors. In 1977, he moved to Saprissa and became the Costa Rica Premier Division top goalscorer in 1977 with 27 goals.

After a short stint in Ecuador with Cuenca, he returned to Costa Rica to finish his career at Municipal Puntarenas.

== Managerial career ==
After retiring as a player, Mansilla moved to Panama to take charge of the national team. He subsequently managed Panamanian outfit Tauro on four occasions, winning 5 league titles. On 26 February 1988, he became the first coach to manage in the then newly formed ANAPROF league when Tauro met Plaza Amador. He was in the hot seat at several other Panamanian clubs and won another title with Chorrillo in the 2011 Apertura season. He also managed Once Municipal, winning a Salvadoran title, and Alianza in El Salvador.

== Death ==
Mansilla died in June 2013, aged 60. He was reportedly transferred from the San Judas Tadeo Clinic in Panama City to the Complejo de la Caja de Seguro Social where he suffered a brain aneurysm and subsequently died from cardiac arrest.
