= Panamá Viejo F.C. =

- Full name: Panamá Viejo Fútbol Club
- Nickname(s): Los Cangrejeros
- Founded: 1978
- Dissolved: 2001
- Ground: Estadio Javier Cruz 'Artes y Oficios'; Panama City, Panama
- Capacity: 2,500
- League: ANAPROF
Home colours

Panamá Viejo F.C. was a Panamanian football team founded in 1978 and based in Panamá Viejo, Panama. The club was a regular participant in the ANAPROF (now Liga Panameña de Fútbol), and in their final season the Cangrejeros won the 2000–01 championship. They succumbed to financial problems at the end of 2001.

== History ==
Panamá Viejo was founded in 1978, and become a frequent participant in the ANAPROF. During the 2000–01 season, they enjoyed their most memorable success, reaching the championship final for the very first time. There, they met Tauro F.C., the defending champions and aiming at their fourth championship in five years. Panama Viejo, however, entered with one of their strongest teams ever. Theirs was a lineup that featured Panamanian internationals like tall striker Anel Canales, winger Víctor Herrera, attacking midfielder Ricardo Phillips, midfielder Blas Pérez, young defensive midfielder Juan de Dios Pérez, and keeper Óscar McFarlane. They were managed by Gary Stempel.

The final match between Panamá Viejo and Tauro FC went down as one of the greatest finals in the history of ANAPROF. Tauro scored first, but thanks to two Erick Martinez goals Panamá Viejo was able to go ahead 3–1. Tauro rallied to equalize the tie at 3-3, but Rodney Ramos's extra time penalty won the match for Panamá Viejo.

It was Panamá Viejo's only title. The club was family owned, and when they were unable to find a sponsor for the ensuing season, the owners decided to seek a merger. Ironically, they merged with Tauro FC. Unfortunately for the Cangrejeros, in 2001 they suffered financial problems and they were forced to merge with Tauro whereby they ceased to exist.

Panamá Viejo's crest before winning the 2000–01 championship

== Honors ==
- ANAPROF: 1

2000–01

== Notable former players ==
- (Panama) Alberto Blanco
- (Panama) Anel Canales
- (Panama) Víctor Herrera
- (Panama) Juan Jesús Julio
- (Panama) Óscar McFarlane
- (Panama) Blas Pérez
- (Panama) Juan de Dios Pérez
- (Panama) Ricardo Phillips
- (Panama) Gary Ramos
- (Panama) Rodney Ramos

== Notable former managers ==
- (England) (Panama) Gary Stempel (1998–2001)
