= Engie Mitre =

Panamanian footballer (born 1981)

Engin Mitre
Personal information
- Full name: Engin Alberto Mitre
- Date of birth: 16 October 1981 (age 45)
- Place of birth: Panama City, Panama
- Height: 1.82 m (6 ft 0 in)
- Position: Midfielder

Team information
- Current team: Chorrillo

Senior career*
Years	Team	Apps	(Gls)
1998–2008	Plaza Amador	175	(41)
2009–2012	Chorrillo	70	(14)
2013–2015	SUNTRACS		
2015–	Chorrillo		

International career^{‡}
2004–2007	Panama	34	(0)
- * Club domestic league appearances and goals as of 31 July 2006 ‡ National team caps and goals as of 10 September 2006

Engin Alberto Mitre (born 16 October 1981) is a Panamanian football midfielder who played for Chorrillo in the Liga Profesional de Fútbol.

== Club career ==
Nicknamed el Doctor, Mitre started his career at hometown club Plaza Amador and joined Chorrillo in December 2008.

In June 2015, he missed out on promotion to the LPF after his team SUNTRACS lost the Panamanian Second Division championship decider to Atlético Nacional. He subsequently returned to Chorrillo and the LPF.

== International career ==
Mitre made his debut for the Panama national football team in January 2004 against El Salvador and has earned a total of 34 caps, scoring no goals. He represented his country in 11 FIFA World Cup qualification matches and was a member of the 2005 CONCACAF Gold Cup team, who finished second in the tournament. Mitre also played at the 2007 CONCACAF Gold Cup.

His final international match was a June 2007 CONCACAF Gold Cup match against the United States.

== Personal life ==
A qualified doctor, Mitre joined the medical staff of the Panama U-17 team for the 2011 FIFA U-17 World Cup in Mexico. He has his own clinic in Paraiso, San Miguelito District.

His father, Carlos Alberto Mitre also played for Panama in the 1970s.

== Honours ==
Panama

- CONCACAF Gold Cup runner-up: 2005
