= Joel Solanilla =

Panamanian football defender (born 1980)

Personal information
- Full name: Joel Isaac Solanilla Valdespino
- Date of birth: 24 December 1983 (age 42)
- Place of birth: Panama City, Panama
- Height: 1.83 m (6 ft 0 in)
- Position: Defender

Youth career
- Pan de Azúcar

Senior career*
Years	Team	Apps	(Gls)
2001	Talleres Córdoba		
2002–2003	Plaza Amador		
2003	Patriotas		
2004–2005	Plaza Amador		
2005–2006	Árabe Unido		
2006	Envigado	19	(0)
2007	Plaza Amador		
2007	San Francisco	4	(0)
2007–2008	FAS		
2009–2011	Sporting San Miguelito	32	(1)
2012	→ Deportivo Malacateco (loan)	15	(0)
2012–2013	Millenium UP		
2014–2015	Costa del Este		

International career^{‡}
2003–2009	Panama	30	(0)
- * Club domestic league appearances and goals as of 31 July 2006 ‡ National team caps and goals as of 31 August 2015

Joel Isaac Solanilla Valdespino (born 24 December 1983 in Panama, Panama) is a Panamanian football defender who most recently played for Panamanian second division team Costa del Este.

== Playing career ==
=== Club ===
Solanilla started his career with Argentinian side Talleres de Córdoba, but has spent most of his playing career in Panama, joining Plaza Amador in January 2004. He made a move to Colombian first division side Envigado in 2006, only to leave them in August 2006 claiming the club owed him salary.

In August 2007, Solanilla moved abroad again to play for Salvadoran side FAS from San Francisco, whom he had only joined a month earlier.

He joined Guatemalan club Deportivo Malacateco in December 2011 on loan from Sporting San Miguelito, only to be released by the club in March 2012 after playing only 5 matches.

He went on to play in the Panamanian second division and joined Costa del Este ahead of the 2014 Clausura.

=== International ===
Solanilla played at the 2003 FIFA World Youth Championship in the United Arab Emirates.

He made his senior debut for Panama in a February 2003 UNCAF Nations Cup match against Guatemala and has earned a total of 30 caps, scoring no goals. He represented his country in 5 FIFA World Cup qualification matches and was a member of the 2005 CONCACAF Gold Cup team, who finished second in the tournament and he also played at the 2009 CONCACAF Gold Cup.

His final international was a July 2009 CONCACAF Gold Cup match against Nicaragua.

== Personal life ==
His parents are Isaac Solanilla and Yadira Valdespino. His older brother Osvaldo won 10 caps for Panama in 1996 and 1997.

== Honours ==
Panama

- CONCACAF Gold Cup runner-up: 2005
