= Chiriquí F.C. =

Panamanian football team (1995–2002)

- Full name: Chiriquí Fútbol Club
- Nickname: Los lobos
- Founded: April 1995
- Dissolved: 2002
- Ground: Estadio San Cristobal; David, Panama
- Capacity: 2,500
Home colours	Away colours

Chiriquí Fútbol Club was a Panamanian football team that played in the city of David between 1995 and 2002.

== History ==
Chiriquí F.C. was founded in 1995 by a group of businessmen from Chiriquí, including fellow Colombian Enrique París Villegas. The team earned a spot to play in the ANAPROF season of 1995–96 (becoming the first club of the Chiriquí province to do so) during the time where the Panamanian league was divided between the ANAPROF and LINFUNA. Their home stadium was the Estadio Kenny Serracin in David and it was a baseball stadium, after 1999 they played their home games in the Estadio San Cristobal of David.

Los lobos played a total of 7 seasons in the ANAPROF before disappearing in 2002. In most of the seasons the team would be placed in the bottom half of the general position (mostly the bottom positions close to relegation). Its best run was in 1997–98 where they qualified for the quarterfinals as 6th in the league, but they lost on aggregate against Árabe Unido. On 2001 the team finished dead last with a poor record (in the Apertura championship they did not win a single game) and were relegated to Primera A. Unfortunately los lobos suffered a severe economical problem and were forced to abandon the Primera A 2002 championship before it started. Their place in that tournament was bought by Denis Arce and his newly founded team Atlético Chiriquí who recruited most of the players from the Chiriquí F.C. squad for that championship.

== Year-by-year ==
Season	Position	League Record								Play-offs	Notes
		P	W	T	L	F	A	+/-	Pts		
1995–96	9/10	27	7	6	14	29	42	−13	27	Could not qualify	
1996–97	11/12	22	5	6	11	30	28	+2	21	Could not qualify	
1997–98	6/12	24	10	6	8	28	24	+4	36	Quarter-Finals	
1998–99	9/10	18	4	8	6	12	15	−3	20	Could not qualify	Team with less goals for and against in the tournament
1999-00	8/10	17	5	2	10	16	28	−12	17	Could not qualify	Team with less goals for in the tournament
2000–01	9/10	18	4	5	9	19	40	−21	14	Could not qualify	Team with less goals for in the tournament
2001	10/10	18	1	3	14	16	46	−30	6	Could not qualify	Relegated
