= Ricardo Buitrago =

Panamanian footballer (born 1985)

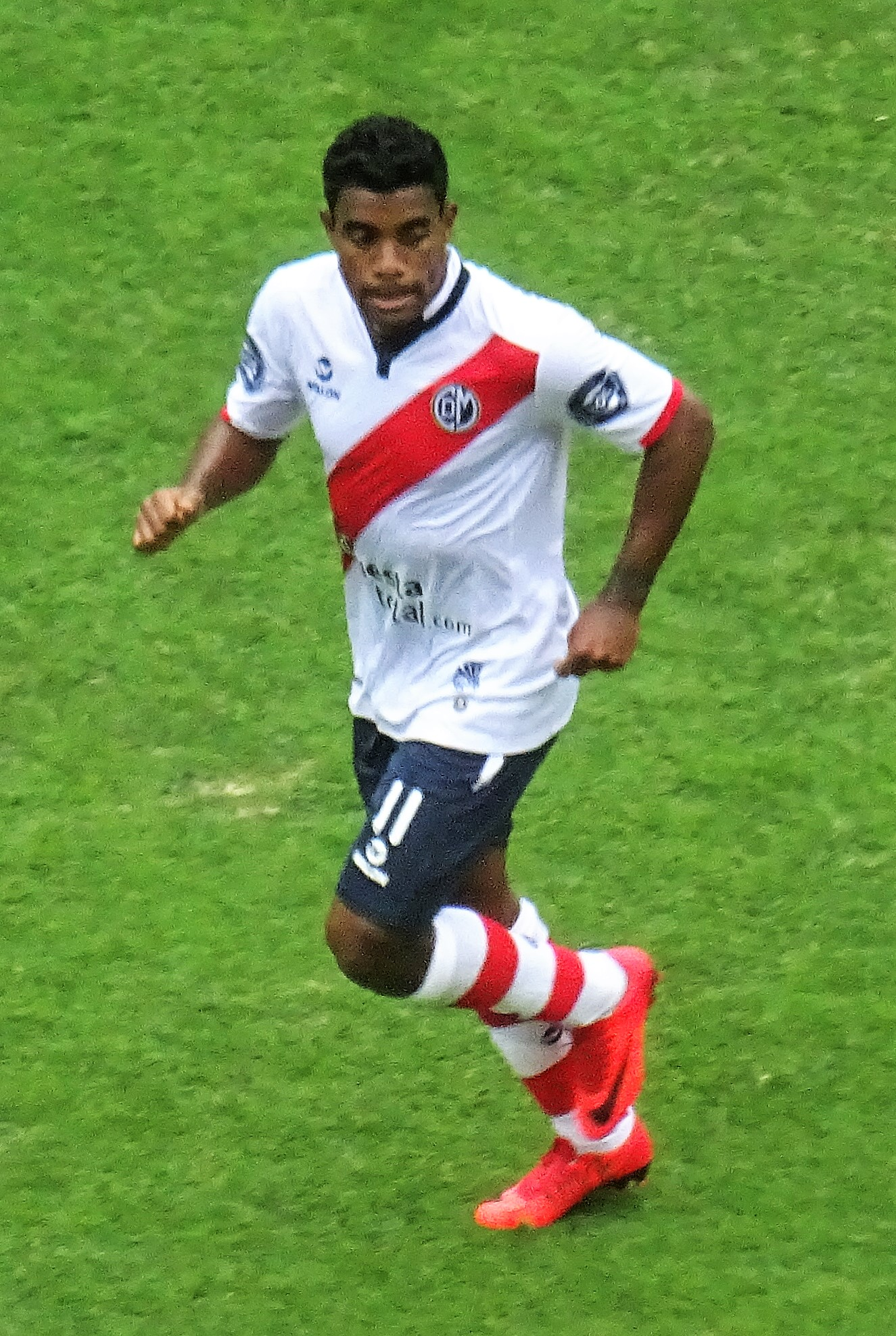

Personal information
- Full name: Ricardo Enrique Buitrago Medina
- Date of birth: 10 March 1985 (age 41)
- Place of birth: Panama City, Panama
- Height: 1.79 m (5 ft 10 1/2 in)
- Position: Midfielder

Team information
- Current team: Plaza Amador
- Number: 10

Youth career
- Plaza Amador

Senior career*
Years	Team	Apps	(Gls)
2004–2008	Plaza Amador		
2008–2010	Deportes Quindío	6	(0)
2010–2011	Plaza Amador	27	(6)
2012	Elche Ilicitano		
2012–2013	Elche	0	(0)
2013	Almoradí	7	(0)
2013	Plaza Amador	17	(2)
2014	Cartaginés		
2014–2015	Plaza Amador	31	(11)
2015–2017	Juan Aurich	50	(5)
2017	Plaza Amador	3	(1)
2017	Juan Aurich	31	(8)
2018–2019	Deportivo Municipal	68	(10)
2020–	Plaza Amador	2	(0)

International career^{‡}
2005	Panama U20	1	(0)
2010–	Panama	28	(3)
- * Club domestic league appearances and goals as of 22:23, 14 September 2020 (UTC) ‡ National team caps and goals as of 11 June 2022

Ricardo Enrique Buitrago Medina (born March 10, 1985, in Panama City) is a Panamanian footballer who plays for Plaza Amador as a midfielder.

== Club career ==
Buitrago began his career on hometown's club Plaza Amador, but later moved to Colombia, signing a contract with Deportes Quindío. After two years on Quindío, he moved back to Plaza Amador. In February 2012, he moved to Spain, signing a contract with Elche, being assigned for the "B" team. On June, he was promoted to first team squad.

On 12 September 2012, Buitrago made his debut, in a Copa del Rey match against Córdoba CF. However, on 31 January 2013, he was released from Elche, alongside Jaime Jornet.

On 19 April, Buitrago signed a contract with fifth division club CD Almoradí. On 3 July, he returned to his homeland, signing with Plaza Amador. On 28 January of the following year Buitrago moved teams and countries again, signing with Cartaginés. He moved abroad once more, joining Peruvian side Juan Aurich in summer 2015., and then to Deportivo Municipal in 2018.

== International career ==
Buitrago played at the 2005 World Youth Championship in the Netherlands.

On 8 September 2010, Buitrago made his senior debut with Panama national team, against Trinidad & Tobago. He scored his first goal on 7 October 2011, against Dominica.

In May 2018, he was named in Panama’s preliminary 35 man squad for the 2018 World Cup in Russia. However, he did not make the final 23.

== International goals ==
Scores and results list Panama's goal tally first.

#	Date	Venue	Opponent	Score	Result	Competition
1	7 October 2011	Windsor Park, Roseau, Dominica	Dominica	4–0	5–0	2014 FIFA World Cup qualification
2	15 November 2011	Estadio Rommel Fernández, Panama City, Panama	Dominica	2–0	3–0	2014 FIFA World Cup qualification

== Personal life ==
Nicknamed el Halconcito, he is a son of former Panama international striker Ricardo el Halcón Buitrago.
