= Juan Carlos Cubillas =

Panamanian footballer and manager (born 1971)

Personal information
- Full name: Juan Carlos Cubillas
- Date of birth: October 20, 1971 (age 55)
- Place of birth: El Chorrillo, Panama
- Position: Midfielder

Senior career*
Years	Team	Apps	(Gls)
1996–2007	Tauro		
2005	Santa Rita		

International career^{‡}
1996–2005	Panama	56	(2)

Managerial career
- 2010–2011: Tauro
- 2012: Plaza Amador
- 2014–: Panama U-17
- * Club domestic league appearances and goals ‡ National team caps and goals as of 15 August 2015

Juan Carlos Cubillas (born 20 October 1971) is a Panamanian retired football midfielder. He is currently the manager of Panama U-17.

== Club career ==
Cubillas spent the majority of his career with local side Tauro. In summer 2005, he went to play alongside compatriot Ángel Luis Rodríguez for Ecuadoran second division team Santa Rita.

== International career ==
Cubillas made his debut for Panama in a June 1996 FIFA World Cup qualification match against Belize and has earned a total of 53 caps, scoring 2 goals. He represented his country in 15 FIFA World Cup qualification matches.

His final international was a February 2005 UNCAF Nations Cup match against Guatemala.

=== International goals ===
Scores and results list Panama's goal tally first.

#	Date	Venue	Opponent	Score	Result	Competition
1	6 October 1996	Estadio Rommel Fernández, Panama City, Panama	Canada	1–0	1–1	1998 FIFA World Cup qualification
2	27 May 2001	Estadio Excélsior, Puerto Cortés, Honduras	Nicaragua	3–0	6–0	2001 UNCAF Nations Cup

== Managerial career ==
Cubillas was named manager of Tauro in April 2010, but was replaced by Rolando Palma in November 2011. He took charge of Plaza Amador in January 2012 but was already dismissed in February 2012. In February 2014 Cubillas was appointed head coach of the Panama national under-17 football team.
