= Víctor Herrera (footballer) =

Panamanian footballer (born 1980)

Victor Herrera
Personal information
- Full name: Victor Manuel Herrera Piggott
- Date of birth: April 18, 1980 (age 46)
- Place of birth: Panama City, Panama
- Height: 1.80 m (5 ft 11 in)
- Position: Winger

Senior career*
Years	Team	Apps	(Gls)
1997–2001	Panamá Viejo		
2001	Sporting '89		
- Toluca
- Necaxa
2002	Luis Ángel Firpo		
2002	Millonarios		
2004–2006	San Francisco	27	(8)
2007–2008	Puerto Rico Islanders	17	(2)
2008	→ Sevilla PR (loan)	19	(9)
2009–2010	San Francisco	28	(7)
2008	Sporting San Miguelito	26	(5)
2009–2010	San Francisco	3	(0)

International career^{‡}
2000–2010	Panama	32	(2)
- * Club domestic league appearances and goals as of 18 June 2007 ‡ National team caps and goals as of 10 June 2015

Victor Manuel Herrera Piggott (born 18 April 1980) is a Panamanian football midfielder.

== Club career ==
Herrera played for several clubs in Panama as well as abroad. In July 2002 he joined Colombian side Millonarios but in October 2002, he was fired by the club for underperforming. He also had a spell in El Salvador with Luis Ángel Firpo and in Puerto Rican football with Puerto Rico Islanders and Sevilla PR.

== International career ==
Herrera has been a member of all the youth processes of the Panama national team.

Nicknamed el Negro, he made his debut for Panama in a January 2000 friendly match against Guatemala and has earned a total of 32 caps, scoring 2 goals. He represented his country at the 2007 and 2009 CONCACAF Gold Cups.

His final international was a December 2010 friendly match against Honduras.

=== International goals ===
Scores and results list Panama's goal tally first.

#	Date	Venue	Opponent	Score	Result	Competition
1	7 January 2000	Estadio Rommel Fernández, Panama City, Panama	Guatemala	4–1	4–1	Friendly match
2	22 August 2007	Estadio Rommel Fernández, Panama City, Panama	Guatemala	2–1	2–1	Friendly match

== Personal life ==
Herrera is a nephew of former Panama international player Percival Piggott. He was diagnosed with leukemia in February 2013.

== Honors ==
Club

- ANAPROF (2): 2000, 2006
- Puerto Rico Soccer League (1): 2008

National team

- UNCAF Nations Cup Runner-Up (1): 2007
- UNCAF Nations Cup Champions (1): 2009
