= Ricardo Phillips (footballer, born 1975) =

Panamanian footballer (born 1975)

Personal information
- Full name: Ricardo Oscar Phillips
- Date of birth: January 31, 1975 (age 51)
- Place of birth: Panama City, Panama
- Height: 1.67 m (5 ft 5 1/2 in)
- Positions: Attacking midfielder; second striker

Youth career
- Atletico San Joaquin

Senior career*
Years	Team	Apps	(Gls)
1996–1997	Euro Kickers	23	(11)
1998–2001	Panamá Viejo	70	(28)
2003–2004	Tauro	43	(17)
2005	→ New England Revolution (loan)	4	(0)
2006	San Francisco	33	(7)
2007	Chorrillo	32	(4)
2008	Sporting San Miguelito	32	(3)
2009–2010	San Francisco	60	(9)
2011	Atlético Veragüense	10	(1)
2012–2013	Universidad Millenium		

International career^{‡}
1996–2010	Panama	84	(11)
- * Club domestic league appearances and goals as of 18 July 2009 ‡ National team caps and goals as of 18 July 2009

Ricardo Oscar Phillips (born 31 January 1975) is a Panamanian former football midfielder.

== Club career ==
A short-sized but speedy attacking midfielder, Phillips started his career at Euro Kickers and joined Panamá Viejo in 2001. He later signed for Tauro, who loaned him to Major League Soccer franchise New England Revolution in summer 2005. In January 2006, Phillips was announced as a reinforcement by Colombian club Atlético Bucaramanga and he joined Deportivo Pereira for a trial in summer 2007, but a definitive move did not materialize. He did play in Panama for the Liga Panameña de Fútbol team San Francisco FC.

In April 2013, Phillips was keen on winning promotion with second division side Millenium UP.

== International career ==
Nicknamed Patón, he made his debut for the Panama national football team in a June 1996 FIFA World Cup qualification match against Belize and has earned a total of 84 caps, scoring 11 goals. He represented his country in 21 FIFA World Cup qualification matches and was a member of the 2005 CONCACAF Gold Cup team, who finished second in the tournament and he also played at the 2007 and 2009 CONCACAF Gold Cups as well as at the 2009 UNCAF Nations Cup, where Panama were champions.

His final international was a January 2010 friendly match against Chile.

=== Personal life ===
Phillips' son Ricardo is also a professional footballer, currently signed with Slovak Fortuna Liga club DAC 1904 Dunajská Streda.

=== International goals ===
Scores and results list Panama's goal tally first.

#	Date	Venue	Opponent	Score	Result	Competition
1	12 October 1999	Estadio Rommel Fernández, Panama City, Panama	Trinidad and Tobago	2–2	2–2	Friendly match
2	26 January 2000	Estadio La Pedrera, Guatemala City, Guatemala	Guatemala	1–1	1–1	Friendly match
3	16 March 2004	Estadio Pedro Marrero, Havana, Cuba	Cuba	1–0	1–1	Friendly match
4	28 April 2004	Estadio Rommel Fernández, Panama City, Panama	Bermuda	1–1	4–1	Friendly match
5	28 April 2004	Estadio Rommel Fernández, Panama City, Panama	Bermuda	4–1	4–1	Friendly match
6	13 June 2004	Estadio Rommel Fernández, Panama City, Panama	Saint Lucia	3–0	4–0	2006 FIFA World Cup qualification
7	21 July 2005	Giants Stadium, East Rutherford, United States	Colombia	1–0	3–2	2005 CONCACAF Gold Cup
8	21 July 2005	Giants Stadium, East Rutherford, United States	Colombia	3–1	3–2	2005 CONCACAF Gold Cup
9	16 August 2006	Estadio Nacional, Lima, Peru	Peru	1–0	2–0	Friendly match
10	16 February 2007	Estadio Cuscatlán, San Salvador, El Salvador	Guatemala	1–0	2–0	2007 UNCAF Nations Cup
11	30 January 2009	Estadio Tiburcio Carías Andino, Tegucigalpa, Honduras	Honduras	1–0	1–0	2009 UNCAF Nations Cup

== Honours ==
Panama

- CONCACAF Gold Cup runner-up: 2005
