= Tauro FC =

Association football club in Panama

Tauro
- Full name: Asociacion Deportiva Tauro Fútbol Club
- Nicknames: Los Toros de Pedregal (The Bulls of Pedregal); El Club de Panamá (Panama's Club)
- Founded: 1984; 42 years ago
- Ground: Estadio Rommel Fernández
- Capacity: 32,000
- Chairman: Alvaro Vargas
- Manager: Felipe Baloy
- League: Liga Panameña de Fútbol
Home colours	Away colours

Tauro Fútbol Club is a professional football club based in the district of Pedregal, Panama City, Panama. It was founded on 22 September 1984 and has participated in the Panamanian Football League (LPF) since 1988. Its founder, Giancarlo Gronchi, was a fan of Juventus and for that reason the colours of the club are black and white. They have won thirteen championships between 1989 and 2017, making them the most successful club in the league. Their traditional rival has been Plaza Amador. Their meetings are known as the "El Clásico" in Panama.

== History ==
Tauro FC's origins date to 1984, when tannery owner Giancarlo Gronchi, an immigrant from Italy, decided to create an internal football league for his company. From that came the idea of forming a company team. At that time, there were leagues formed of teams representing various Panamanian companies, as well as leagues formed of teams from the various immigrant colonies in Panama. Tauro competed in those leagues, as well as the Panamanian District League, from its founding on 22 September 1984 to 1988.

In 1988, Tauro joined six other teams in forming ANAPROF, Panama's first national professional league. This was a significant turning point in Panamanian football, which at the time was a smaller soccer presence in the region.

Gronchi's favorite Italian team was Juventus FC, and in the honor of that Italian power, Tauro also competed in black and white striped jerseys. They club won its first title in 1989, and during the 1990s was the dominant team in Panamanian football.

What followed was the glory days of Tauro FC, which won championships in 1989, 1991, 1996–97, 1997–98, and 1999–2000. Closely identified with the club's success in those years was Uruguayan Miguel Angel Mansilla, who managed the team on five occasions, interspersed with three stints managing Panama's national team.

Perhaps the most memorable title of that run came in 1996–97, when Patricio Guevara's 9th-minute goal lifted Tauro to a championship victory over the AFC Euro Kickers. That strike ended a five-year championship drought, and was followed by a repeat win over Deportivo Árabe Unido in 1997–98. The club won a fifth crown in 1999–2000, upsetting archrivals C.D. Plaza Amador. Plaza Amador was favored because they had signed striker Víctor René Mendieta, widely considered one of the best players in Panamanian history.

Tauro has continued to win championships in the Apertura/Clausura era. In 2003, they swept the season under the direction of Colombian manager Gonzalo Soto. In Clausura 2006, they followed the leadership of ex-player Ruben Guevara to another crown. In Apertura 2007, Mansilla returned to lead the club to a tenth championship (the fifth under his direction).

The club's tenth title came in Apertura 2010, under the leadership of Juan Carlos Cubillas. The club has also won titles in Clausura 2012 and Apertura 2013, with titles coming under ex-players Sergio "Checho" Angulo and Rolando Palma. In all, four former Bullfighters have won titles as both managers and players.

== Rivalries ==
- Plaza Amador
- Árabe Unido
- San Francisco F.C.

== Honors ==
- Liga Panameña de Fútbol
  - Champions (17) 1989, 1991, 1996–97, 1997–98, 1999–00, Apertura 2003, Clausura 2003, Clausura 2006, Apertura 2007, Apertura 2010, Clausura 2012, Apertura 2013, Clausura 2017, Clausura 2021, Apertura 2024
  - Runners-up (9): 1990, 1994–95, 1998–99, 2000–01, Clausura 2002, 2008 (A), 2008 (C), Apertura 2009, 2018 Apertura, 2019 Apertura, 2023 Clausura

=== National League finals ===
Season	Champion	Runner-up
1989	Tauro FC	Deportivo La Previsora
1991	Tauro FC	AFC Euro Kickers
1996-97	Tauro FC	AFC Euro Kickers
1997-98	Tauro FC	Árabe Unido
1999-00	Tauro FC	CD Plaza Amador
2003 (a)	Tauro FC	Árabe Unido
2003 (c)	Tauro FC	Alianza FC
2006 (c)	Tauro FC	Árabe Unido
2007 (a)	Tauro FC	San Francisco FC
2010 (a)	Tauro FC	San Francisco FC
2012 (c)	Tauro FC	Chepo FC
2013 (a)	Tauro FC	San Francisco FC
2017 (c)	Tauro FC	Árabe Unido

== Current squad ==
Note: Flags indicate national team as defined under FIFA eligibility rules; some limited exceptions apply. Players may hold more than one non-FIFA nationality.

No.	Pos.	Nation	Player
1	GK	PAN	Jose Guerra
2	DF	PAN	Humberto Ramos
3	DF	PAN	Rodolfo Rodríguez
4	DF	PAN	Ángel Díaz
7	FW	PAN	Gaby Torres
8	FW	PAN	Victor Medina
10	FW	PAN	Cristian Quintero
11	FW	COL	Jhojan Amaya
14	MF	COL	Jerónimo Rodríguez
15	MF	PAN	Nicholas Anderson
16	MF	PAN	Rudy Yearwood
17	FW	COL	Juan Pablo Muñoz

No.	Pos.	Nation	Player
19	FW	PAN	Josué Vergara
20	MF	PAN	Blas Pérez Jr.
23	DF	PAN	Omar Murillo
24	MF	PAN	Jamal Gonzalez
25	DF	PAN	Jan Carlos Vargas
27	DF	PAN	Carlos Batista
28	MF	COL	Sergio Villareal
29	MF	COL	Juan Pena
30	GK	PAN	Celino Hinojosa
39		PAN	Perea
44		PAN	Molina

== Non-playing staff ==
=== Board of directors ===
Position	Name
President	Alvaro Vargas
Vice-president	Moises Zebede
Secretary	Carlos Martans
Treasurer	Alejandro Pino
Fiscal	Luis Moreno

=== Management hierarchy ===
Position	Name
Manager	(Uruguay) Saul Maldonado
Assistant manager	(Venezuela) Rafael Mea Vitali
Physical trainer	-
Goalkeeping coach	-
Physiotherapist	-
Physiotherapist	-
Head doctor	-
Utility Management	-
Utility Assistant	-
Reserve Manager 1	(Venezuela) Ricardo Mammarella
Reserve Manager 2	(Argentina) Hector D. Chianelli

=== Historical list of coaches ===
- (Costa Rica) Christian Saborío (1988)
- (Uruguay) Miguel Ángel Mansilla (1988–1989)
- (Uruguay) Miguel Ángel Mansilla (1991–1993)
- (Ecuador) José Andrade (1994)
- (Uruguay) Miguel Ángel Mansilla (1994–1999)
- (Panama) José Alfredo Poyatos (2000)
- (Colombia) Gonzalo Soto (2002–2004)
- (Panama) José Alfredo Poyatos (2004–2006)
- (Germany) Thomas Kempe (2006)
- (Panama) Rubén Guevara (2006)
- (Uruguay) Miguel Ángel Mansilla (2007–2008)
- (Colombia) Gonzalo Soto (2008–2010)
- (Costa Rica) Christian Saborío
- (Panama) Juan Carlos Cubillas (2010–2011)
- (Colombia) Sergio Angulo (2011–2012)
- (Colombia) Gonzalo Soto (2012)
- (Colombia) Rolando Palma (2012–2014)
- (Panama) Jorge Dely Valdés (2014)
- (Panama) José Alfredo Poyatos (2015)
- (Panama) Mike Stump (2015)
- (Panama) Jorge Dely Valdés (2015)
- (Colombia) Rolando Palma (2015–2018)
- (Colombia) Sergio Angulo (2018)
- (Spain) Juan Carlos Garcia (2018)
- (Uruguay) Saul Maldonado (2018–2020)
- (Venezuela) Rafael Mea Vitalli (2020)
- (Argentina) Javier Ainstein (2020)
- (Panama) Julio Dely Valdés (2020–2021)
- (Venezuela) Enrique Kike Garcia (2021)
- (Colombia) Rolando Palma (2021–2022)
- (Venezuela) Francisco Perlo (August 2022 – April 2023)
- (Panama) Diego Gutierrez (interim) (April 2023 – May 2023)
- (Panama) Felipe Baloy (June 2023 – February 2025)
- (Venezuela) Kike García (March 2025 – September 2025)
- (Colombia) Carlos Lenis (interim) (September 2025 – October 2025)
- (Colombia) Bernardo Redín (October 2025 – present)

== International participations ==
- CONCACAF Champions League: 6 appearances

2008-09 : Group stage
2010-11 : Preliminary round
2011-12 : Group stage
2012-13 : Group stage
2014-15 : Group stage
2018 : Quarter-finals

- CONCACAF Champions' Cup: 4 appearances

1990 : First round
1991 : Second round
1992 : Third round
1997 : First round
