= C.D. Plaza Amador =

Association football club in Panama

Plaza Amador
- Full name: Club Deportivo Plaza Amador
- Nicknames: Los Leones (The Lions); El Equipo del Pueblo (The Team of the People); La Plaza (The Plaza)
- Founded: April 25, 1955; 71 years ago
- Ground: Estadio Maracaná
- Capacity: 6,000
- Chairman: Gian Castillero
- League: Liga Panameña de Fútbol
Home colours	Away colours	Third colours

Plaza Amador is a Panamanian professional football club based in Panama City, that currently plays in Liga Panameña de Fútbol. It is the oldest club in Panama.

== History ==
C.D Plaza Amador was founded in 1955 by Panamanian sports legend León Cocoliso Tejada (1927–1982). Under Tejada's leadership, the club relied heavily on developing and training players (rather than high-profile signings). After Tejada's's death, new directors Andrés Villa, Daniel Vàsquez and Enrique Cajar led the club back to the highest level of Panamanian football. They won the district title, the COPA JVC, and in 1988 claimed their first ever ANAPROF championship. Amador proceeded to win titles in 1990 and 1992. After a long drought, they claimed victory in Apertura 2002 (as well as that year's grand final), Clausura 2005 (as well as that year's grand final), and Clausura 2016.

== Emblems ==
The club's colors are the three colors of the Panamanian flag: red, white and blue. Plaza Amador was named after the square plaza located in the Amador neighborhood of El Chorrillo borough.

== Players ==
=== Current squad ===
Note: Flags indicate national team as defined under FIFA eligibility rules; some limited exceptions apply. Players may hold more than one non-FIFA nationality.

No.	Pos.	Nation	Player
1	GK	PAN	Jaime de Gracia
2	DF	PAN	José Matos
4	DF	PAN	Jimar Sánchez
5	MF	PAN	Daniel Aparicio
6	MF	PAN	Joel Lara
7	FW	PAN	Isidoro Hinestroza
8	MF	PAN	Rodolfo Vega
9	FW	PAN	Ángel Sánchez
10	MF	PAN	Ricardo Buitrago
11	FW	PAN	Ricardo Phillips
12	GK	PAN	Miguel Pérez
14	MF	PAN	Abdul Knight
15	DF	PAN	Omar Valencia
17	DF	PAN	Gerardo Negrete

No.	Pos.	Nation	Player
19	FW	PAN	Alberto Quintero
20	FW	PAN	Edgar Espinoza
21	MF	PAN	Julio Domínguez
22	MF	PAN	Juan González
24	DF	PAN	Juan Jiménez
26	DF	PAN	Jhonnathan García
29	FW	PAN	Ovidio Lopez
39	MF	PAN	Erick Register
42	GK	PAN	Daniel Hughes
46	DF	PAN	Derek Briceño
51	MF	PAN	Anel Ryce
81	FW	PAN	Ricardo Clarke
99	MF	PAN	Romario Piggott

== Honours ==
- Liga Panameña de Fútbol: 10

1988, 1990, 1992, 2002, 2005, 2016 Clausura, Apertura 2021, Apertura 2025, Clausura 2025, Clausura 2026

- Copa JVC: 1

1986

== International Participations ==
- CONCACAF Champions League: 1 appearance

2016-17 – Group Stage

- CONCACAF League: 1 appearance

2017 – Semifinals

- CONCACAF Cup Winners Cup: 4 appearances

1988 : Preliminary Round
1989 : Second Round
1991 : First Round
1993 : First Round

- UNCAF Interclub Cup: 3 appearances

2001 : First Round
2004 : Quarterfinals
2006 : First Round

== Historical list of coaches ==
- (El Salvador) Milton Palacios (1990-1991)
- (Colombia) Carlos Collazo (1992–1993)
- (Panama) Ricardo Buitrago (1996)
- (Costa Rica) (Uruguay) Américo Bravo (2002)
- (Argentina) Sergio Giovagnolli (2002)
- (Panama) Fernando Arnulfo Bolívar (2005)
- (Panama) Ricardo Buitrago (2005)
- (Colombia) Mauricio Álvarez (2006–2009)
- (Colombia) Jair Palacios (2009)
- (Panama) Leopoldo Lee (2010)
- (Italy) Marcos Casagrande (2010)
- (Colombia) Jair Palacios (2010)
- (Panama) Rubén Guevara (2010–2011)
- (Argentina) Marcelo Javier Ainstein (Aug 2011 – Apr 2012)
- (Panama) Juan Carlos Cubillas (2012)
- (Panama) Leonicio de la Flor (2012)
- (Spain) Carlos García Cantarero (2013)
- (Colombia) Richard Parra (2013)
- (United States) Mike Stump (2013–2014)
- (Spain) Juan Carlos García (2015)
- (Colombia) Jair Palacios (2016–2017)
- (Spain) Juan Carlos García (2017–2018)
- (Colombia) Javier Álvarez Arteaga (2018–2019)
- (United States) Mike Stump (2019–2020)
- (Panama) Jorge Dely Valdés (2020–2022)
- (Panama) Mario Méndez (December 2023 - Present)
