= Sporting San Miguelito =

Association football club in Panama

- Full name: Academia de Futbol Sporting San Miguelito
- Nickname: La Academia
- Founded: 1989; 37 years ago
- Ground: Estadio Los Andes II; San Miguelito, Panamá
- Capacity: 2,000
- President: Raul Pineda
- Manager: (Panama) Cesar Aguilar
- League: Liga Panameña de Fútbol
- Website: www.sportingsm.com.pa
Home colours	Away colours

Academia de Futbol Sporting San Miguelito is a Panamanian professional football team playing in Liga Panameña de Fútbol (the highest level of Panamanian football). Founded in 1989, it is based in San Miguelito District of Panamá Province.

== History ==
=== Sporting '89 ===
The club was founded in 1989 by Cesar Morales as a youth soccer academy called Sporting '89. In 1997 reached ANAPROF by winning to Chorrillo F.C. in a promotion playoff. Making their top tier debut on 19 July 1997 against Chiriquí F.C. (2-1 win)

=== Sporting Coclé ===
In the summer of 2002, the club was relocated to Antón, Province of Coclé changing its name to Sporting Coclé under Ruben Navarro management, citing the lack of youth development on San Miguelito District.

=== Sporting San Miguelito ===
Five years later (2007), they relocated back to San Miguelito and changed their name again, adopting the name of San Miguelito, which remains the club name today.
Starting in 2011–2012, San Miguelito became a title contender. They topped the table in the regular season of both Apertura 2011 and Clausura 2012 (although they were eliminated in the semifinals each time). Then, in Clausura 2013, they claimed their first title by defeating San Francisco 4-1 in the championship final. They also reached the finals of Apertura 2015. Since then, results have declined, although the club has as of yet evaded relegation.

== Stadium ==
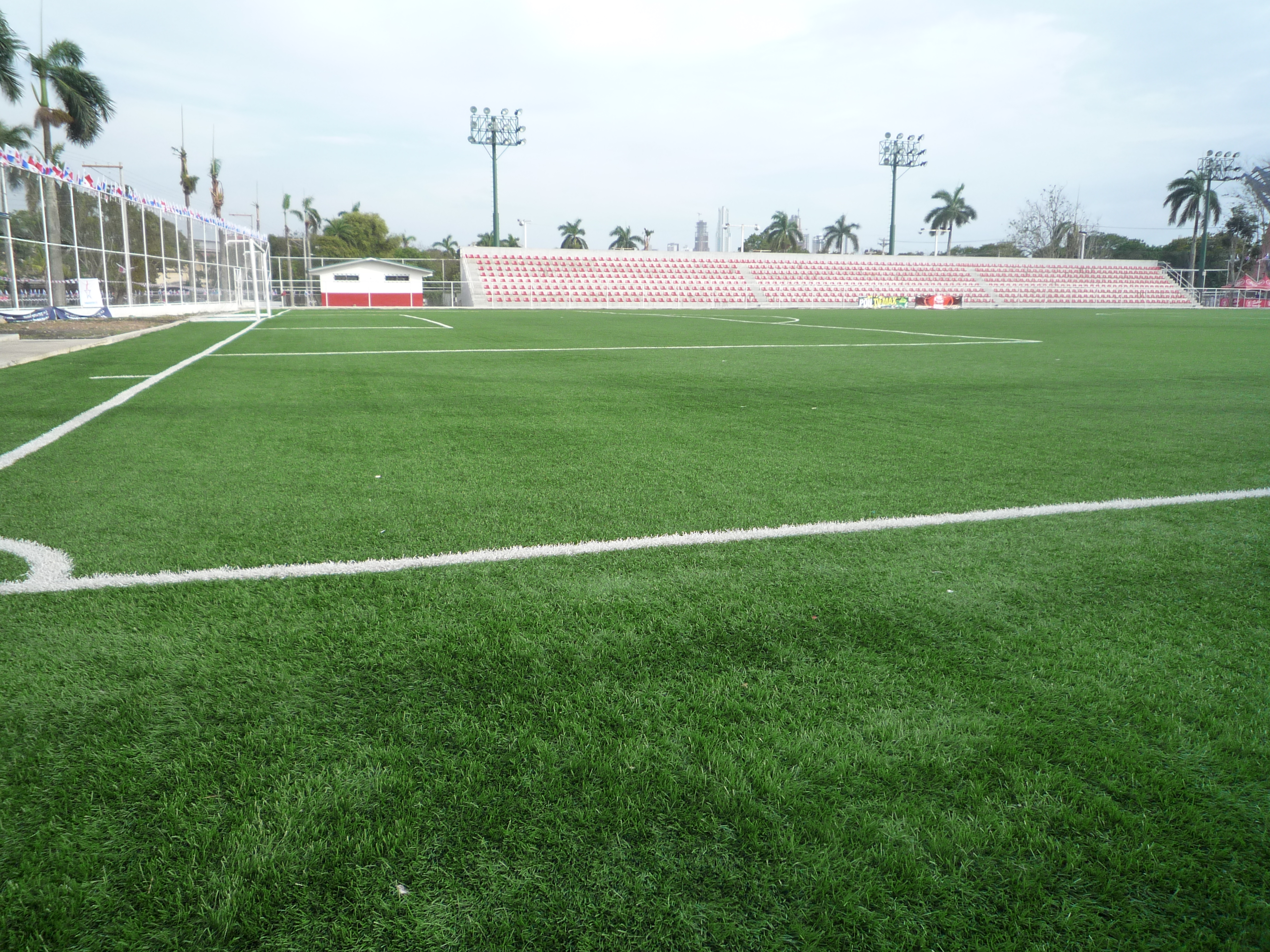
Luis E. Tapia Stadium artificial turf

Name	Location	Years
Estadio 28 de Diciembre	San Miguelito, Panamá	1997–2002 playing as Sporting Coclé
Estadio Javier Cruz	Panama City, Panamá	1999–2000
El Ciruelito	Antón, Cocle	2002–2005, playing as Sporting Coclé
Estadio Bernardo Gil	San Miguelito, Panamá	2005–2009
Estadio Luis E. Tapia	Panama City, Panamá	2010–2016
Cancha Oscar Sumán Carrillo	Panama City, Panamá	2017
Estadio Luis E. Tapia	Panama City, Panamá	2018–2021
Estadio Los Andes II	San Miguelito, Panamá	2022–present

== Current Squad ==
Note: Flags indicate national team as defined under FIFA eligibility rules; some limited exceptions apply. Players may hold more than one non-FIFA nationality.

No.	Pos.	Nation	Player
1	GK	PAN	Kevin Mosquera
3	MF	PAN	Kadir Hurtado
4	DF	PAN	Kevin Galvan
5		PAN	Armando Cooper
6	MF	PAN	Emerson Giron
7		PAN	Anthony Stewart
8		PAN	Martin Ruiz
9		PAN	Joseph Cox
10		PAN	Yair Jaen
11	FW	PAN	Adan Henricks
12	GK	PAN	Marcos de Leon
15	DF	PAN	Alexis Cedeno

No.	Pos.	Nation	Player
17		PAN	Angel Valencia
20		PAN	Ramses de Leon
21		PAN	Jordan Giron
23		COL	Jeslan Caicedo
25	DF	PAN	Rigoberto Nino
27	DF	PAN	Rodrigo Tello
30		PAN	Oldemar Castillo
33	MF	PAN	Julio Betancourt
38		PAN	Joseph Valencia
39		PAN	Daniel Hoyos

== Non-playing staff ==
=== Board of directors ===
Position	Name
President	Raul Pineda
Vice-president	Mario Corro
General Manager	David Castillo

=== Historical list of coaches ===
- (Panama) Víctor René Mendieta (1997)
- (Panama) José Montenegro (– July 2002)
- (Colombia) Jairo Silva (July 2002 – 2003)
- (Colombia) Jair Palacios (July 2003)
- (El Salvador) Edgar López López (July 2008)
- (Panama) Leonicio de la Flor
- (Panama) Carlos Walcott (October – November 2009)
- (Spain) Fernando García Ramos (2009 – 2010)
- (Panama) Percival Piggott (March – November 2010)
- (Colombia) Richard Parra (2010 – 2011)
- (Panama) Pacifico Girón (January – September 2012)
- (Panama) Mario Anthony Torres (2012 – 2019)
- (Colombia) Jair Palacios (2019 – 2020)
- (Uruguay) César Eduardo Méndez (2020 – 2021)
- (Uruguay) Saúl Maldonado (April – November 2021)
- (Brazil) Felipe Borowsky (2021 – 2023)
- (Spain) David Dóniga (June 2023 – December 2023)
- (Colombia) Jair Palacios (2023 – 2024)
- (Panama) Cesar Aguilar (November 2024 – present)

== Honours ==
=== Domestic honours ===
- Liga Panameña de Fútbol and predecessors
  - Champion (1): Clausura 2013
- Primera A and predecessors
  - Champions (1) : 1996–97
