= Agua Dulce =

Agua Dulce is Spanish for freshwater, literally meaning sweet water. Agua Dulce may refer to:

== Places ==
When used as a location name, it can refer to any of several different places:

=== In Mexico ===
- Agua Dulce, Veracruz
- Agua Dulce (Ramsar site), a Ramsar wetland in Sonora, Mexico

=== In Panama ===
- Aguadulce, Coclé
  - Aguadulce District
  - Aguadulce Airport
  - Aguadulce Army Airfield

=== In Spain ===
- Aguadulce, Seville
- Aguadulce, a part of Roquetas de Mar, Almería

=== In the United States ===
- Agua Dulce, California
- Agua Dulce, El Paso County, Texas
- Agua Dulce, Nueces County, Texas

== Other ==
- Agua Dulce people, a Timucua group of northern Florida
- Agua dulce, a hot beverage popular in Costa Rican cuisine
- Battle of Aguadulce, in the Thousand Days War in Panama
- Battle of Agua Dulce, a skirmish in the Texas War of Independence
