= Cano (disambiguation) =

Cano is a surname.

Cano may also refer to:

== Places ==
- Caño, a barrio in the municipality of Guánica, Puerto Rico
- El Caño, Coclé Province, Panama, a town and corregimiento
  - El Caño Archaeological Park
- Isla del Caño, an island in the canton of Osa, Costa Rica

== People ==
- Cano Estremera, Puerto Rican singer Carlos Enrique Estremera Colón (1958–2020), stage name El Cano
- Dona Canô, Claudionor Viana Teles Veloso (1907—2012), mother of two popular Brazilian musicians, Caetano Veloso and Maria Bethânia
- Ricardo Tan, Filipino politician, businessman and former sports administrator nicknamed "Cano"

== Other uses ==
- USS El Cano (IX-79) a US Navy schooner acquired in 1942
- CANO, a French Canadian progressive rock group
- Cano (planthopper), in the family Caliscelidae
- Cana, a Coahuiltecan tribe sometimes spelled Cano

== See also ==
- USS Elcano, a gunboat captured by the US Navy in the Spanish-American War
- Juan Sebastián Elcano (1476–1526), Basque navigator, ship-owner and explorer who completed the first circumnavigation of the world by taking charge after Ferdinand Magellan was killed
- Los Caños (disambiguation)
