= Venado Beach =

Archaeological site in Panama

Map of region in Panama where Venado Beach is located.

Venado Beach is a Pre-Columbian archaeological site on the Pacific coast of Panama. Named for the Venado River, near whose mouth it was found, the site was excavated by Samuel Kirkland Lothrop, Neville A. Harte and Lt. Col. Montgomery in 1951. Venado Beach is part of the Gran Coclé culture. This site is notable for its large number and variety of burials and grave goods, especially those with offerings objects of gold (including tumbaga) and evidence for human sacrifice. Radiocarbon dating places the principal occupation of this site at AD 200-900

== Lifestyle ==
While native units were small in Panama, they were nevertheless complex and rigid. Rulers were primarily projected as warriors. There is no historical evidence of theocratic class yet there appears to be a group of nobility that dominates others as servants and promotes their methods and rituals as the proper way to connect to the divine. The social organization of this site could be considered a chiefdom. The people living in lower Central America at this time had complex social systems. They had extensive trading networks. Imported goods ranged from jade to iron tools.

== History ==
Venado Beach was once within the target area used by Fort Kobbe, about 10 miles from the 16th century Spanish settlement of Old Panama. It was first discovered by the U.S. Navy in 1948 while bulldozing off the topsoil in order to enrich the lawns of the 15th Naval District.

== Ethnohistory ==
One of the officials who resided in Old Panama there was Royal Historian Gonzalo Fernández de Oviedo y Valdés. Oviedo most likely knew the local natives and may have even visited the site.

According to Oviedo, the burial customs of the local peoples were viewed by them as magical rituals that gave those buried access to what they believed was another world. These rites were generally reserved for the rich and noble, with the poor rarely receiving burial. An exception to the rule occurred when a slave was chosen to be killed or committed suicide to be buried with their masters, reportedly to serve in the next world. Oviedo's statements suggest that if one ultimately chose to join their masters in the afterlife it was a personal choice. They would either poison themselves or be buried alive while drunk. Oviedo notes that those chosen were usually young, strong and beautiful.

== Excavation ==
The site was excavated in the late 1940s and early 1950s.

=== Burials ===
The skeletal remains of a total of 369 individuals were found extended across the Mangopobre Valley. The bulldozing of the site left the graves without any discernable surface indications. The original depths of the graves are a matter of conjecture. However some may have been at depths of up to 15 feet below the surface at the time of burial. Most remains were found in flexed positions on their sides or backs. Some were found extended and face-up, locally known as a "bathtub burial." About 30% of the burials were on their backs with their hands under their chins, knees to chest and feet crossed. They were so tightly compressed that they were most likely tied together with ropes or in sacks. However, the bodies laid on their sides had not been compressed. About 15% of the bodies were simply extended on their backs. In keeping with the significant variety, these graves were both scattered individuals or associated in compact groups. Most of the burials were blanketed with a layer of red soil, most likely acquired from nearby hills. Abnormal burials, described below, comprise about 20% of the total.

The graves were found on a flat layer of coquina where lateral displacement of the bones was impossible, meaning that the archaeological record had not been shifting over time.

==== Urn Burials ====
Excavators found many burials in ceramic urns. While some contained adults, most held children. Lothrop suggested that these children may have been expected to age and serve in the next life. However, these social status positions were sometimes reversed. In one case, a child had been buried with gold jewelry and elaborate pottery accompanied by an adult urn with no decoration or grave goods.

=== Suicide ===
While it is difficult to identify evidence of suicide in osteological data, some of the archaeological evidence does support the practice of suicide in the manner described by Oviedo. The remains of fifteen bodies in orderly rows suggests death had occurred before interment, perhaps by poisoning. There is evidence for some individuals having been buried alive; some were found with their mouths open as if gasping for air while others died while biting their fingers. However, suicide was not the only method of unnatural death at the site.

=== Sacrifice ===
Several individuals showed evidence of having been intentionally killed, perhaps as sacrifices. Two methods for which there was evidence was breaking the back or the neck. In two specific instances, individuals with broken backs were found face-up with their knees up near one shoulder. In both cases, these individuals were holding bundles of bones, possibly representing their masters. The flesh of these individuals had been systematically removed and in at least one case, their bones had been painted purple.

=== Mutilation ===
Around 25% of the human remains were classified as having evidence for the individuals having been mutilated. These were put into two categories: bundle burials and ritual burials.

==== Bundle Burials ====
Bundle burials are burials in which the bones have been preserved and stripped of flesh. They are often considered to be the bones of the nobility because of the slaves found buried in association. These burials generally had the most elaborate graves. For example, in one exceptional case a body of a presumably important leader was found disarticulated and placed into two separate graves with about twenty graves placed nearby.

==== Ritual Burials ====
There are several types of ritual burials, including individuals who had been decapitated. Sometimes the heads had been buried with the body, other times they had been removed (possibly as trophies). In some cases, heads had been buried with a separate but whole body. The decapitations had been undertaken leaving the mandible intact. Often near the mandible there were two upper canine teeth, presumably extracted from the maxilla before or after removal. This ritual was done with precision and skill, suggesting a long term of use.

A second form of ritual burial was the removal of arms or legs. One arm was often cut off at the shoulder, and placed on top of the other arm. In some cases, graves contained the separated arms or legs of other bodies. Harte had excavated an individual whose legs had been severed.

The last form of ritual burials had amputated fingers. In some cases, the phalanges were either placed in seashells near the body or scattered around the head. In three cases, the phalanges were found inside of the cranium.

Harte's excavation yielded two other types of mutilation. One burial had nothing but pottery and part of a pelvis.

== Gold artwork ==
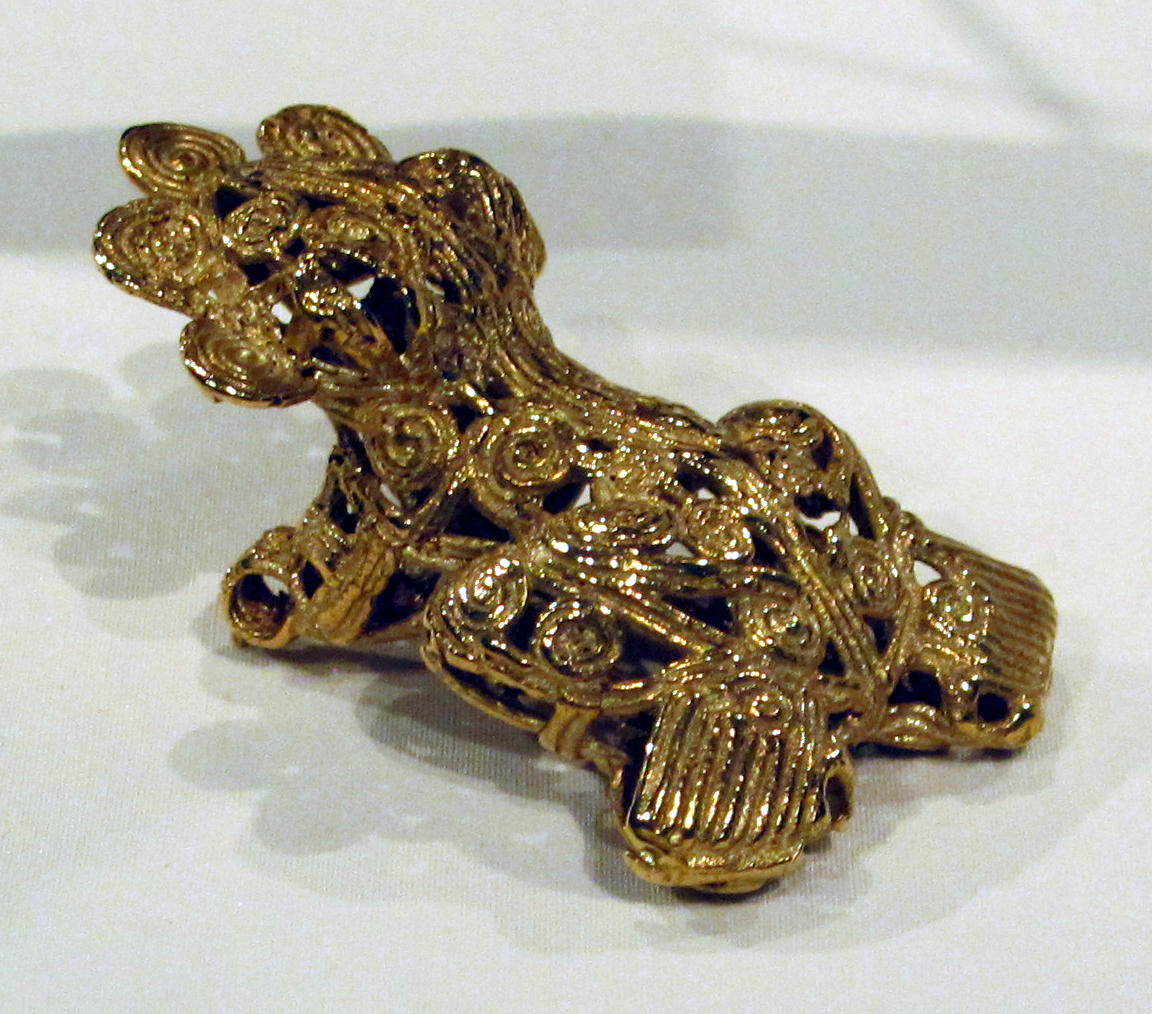
Venado Beach, frog pendent, Metropolitan Museum of Art.

Gold and especially tumbaga artwork at Venado Beach represents some of the most superb examples of lost-wax casting from the time. Frog forms in art are common in Panama, possibly representing fertility. It is similar to that of the Veraguas region of Panama.

After his excavations, Montgomery donated some objects to the Art Institute of Chicago and the Metropolitan Museum of Art. Of these, one example is a pendant in the form of a frog, most likely made between the 6th and 11th centuries. Its size, aesthetic, and technical mastery are considered to indicate that it is one of the best examples from the entire Isthmo-Colombian Area. Gold nose rings were also recovered.
