= Canaveral =

Canaveral may refer to:

== Places ==
=== In Brevard County, Florida, United States ===
- Cape Canaveral, a headland
  - Cape Canaveral, Florida, a city on the cape
  - Cape Canaveral Space Force Station
  - Cape Canaveral Light, lighthouse on the cape
  - Port Canaveral, a port on the cape
  - Kennedy Space Center, also referred to as "Canaveral" or "Cape Canaveral" in some sources
- Canaveral Groves, Florida, an unincorporated community
- Canaveral National Seashore, a national seashore

=== In other countries ===
- Cañaveral, Peru, a town in Contralmirante Villar, Tumbes, Peru
- Cañaveral, Spain, a municipality in Cáceres, Extremadura, Spain
- Cañaveral, Coclé, Panama

== Other uses ==
- "Canaveral", a song by Shellac from their 2000 album 1000 Hurts
- "canaveral", a word for canebrake (from Spanish cañaveral = "canebrake")
