= Elcano (disambiguation) =

Juan Sebastián Elcano (c. 1486–1526) was a Basque explorer and first man to circumnavigate the Earth.

Elcano may also refer to:

- Spanish training ship Juan Sebastián de Elcano, flagship Spanish vessel
- USS Elcano (PG-38), a gunboat seized by the US Navy from the Spanish in 1898
- Elcano (or Elkano), a hamlet of Aia, Basque Country, Spain
- Elcano, Navarre (Elkano in Basque), a village in Valle de Egüés, Navarre, Spain

== See also ==
- El Caño, Natá District, Coclé Province, Panama
- El Caño, Panama (archaeological site)
