= Rosita Liao Gonzales =

Educator and folklorist

Rosita Liao Gonzales (April 18, 1929 - August 11, 1994) was a Panamanian educator and folklorist. Born in La Pintada, Panama, she was noted for her research regarding the culture of Coclé Province. For her efforts as an educator, she was awarded the Order of Manuel José Hurtado.
