= Río Indio =

Río Indio may refer to:

- Indio River, river in Puerto Rico, United States
- Río Indio, Coclé, corregimiento in Panama
- Río Indio, Colón, corregimiento in Panama
