= Gran Coclé =

Archeological culture area in Panama

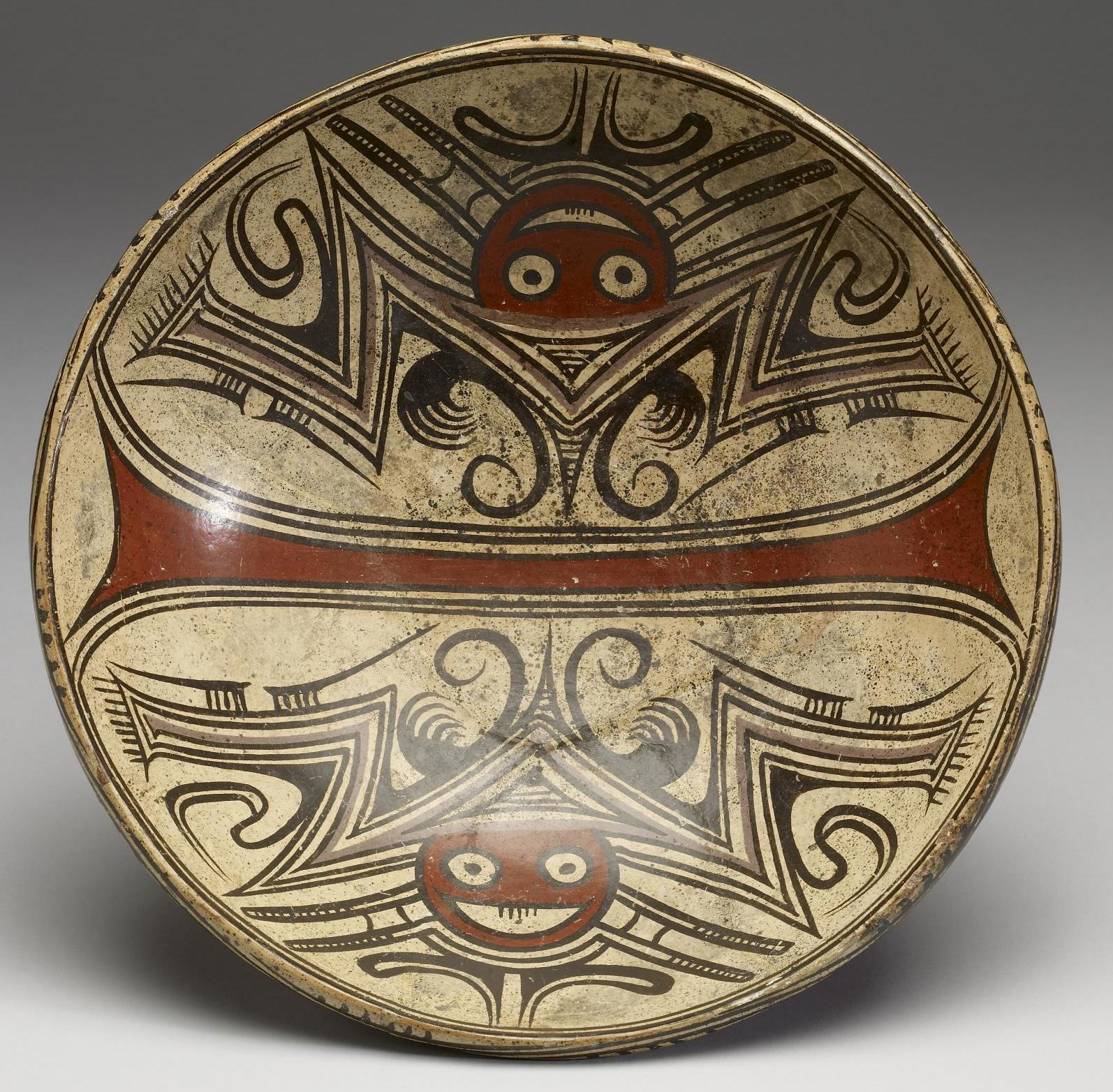
Coclé pedestal dish: Joaquín Polychrome, AD 600-800. The opposed figures are thought to be a shaman in magical flight, as a bat. Collections of Walters Art Museum

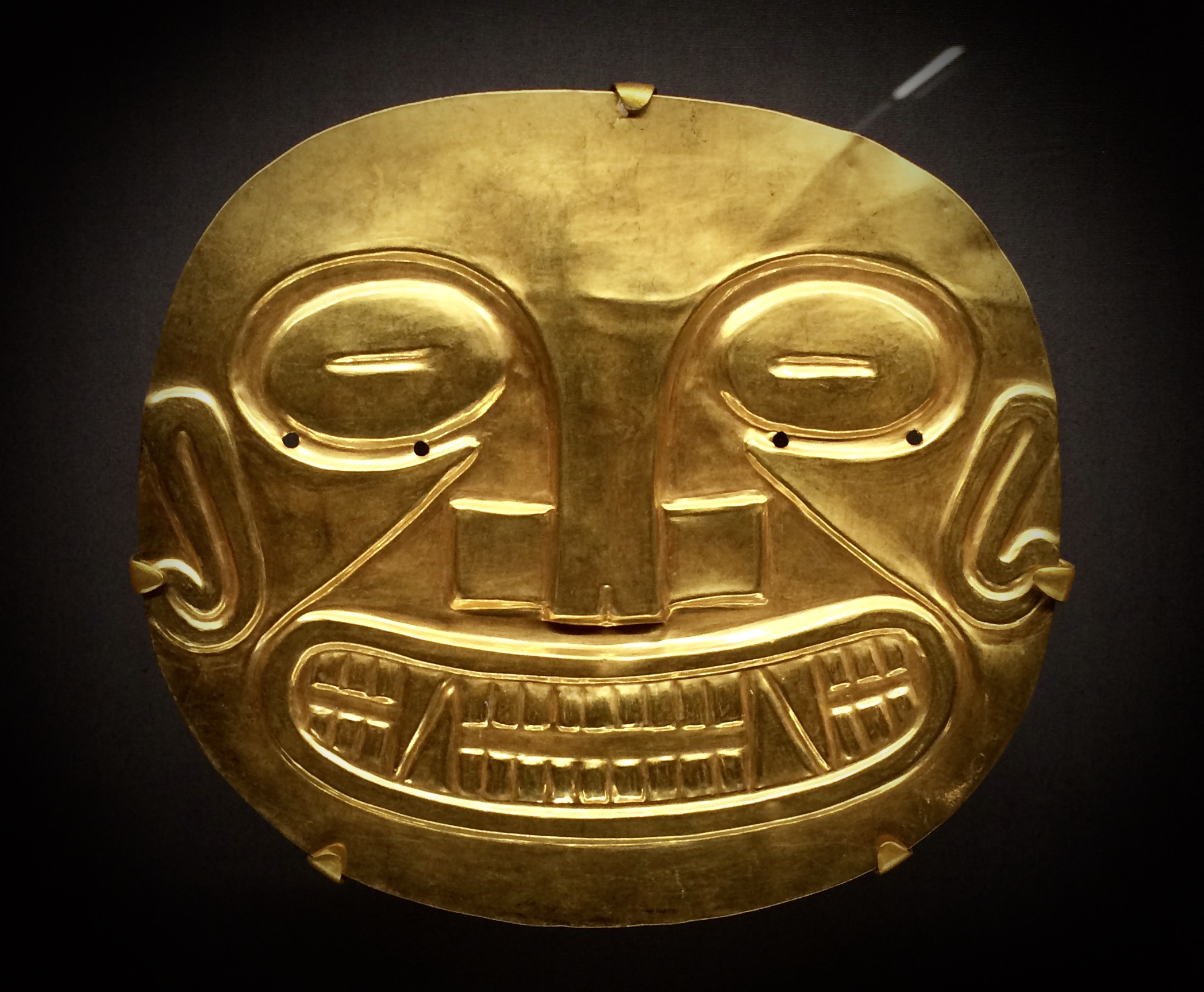
Gold plaque excavated from Sitio Conte, made about 700 AD. Peabody Museum, Harvard University.

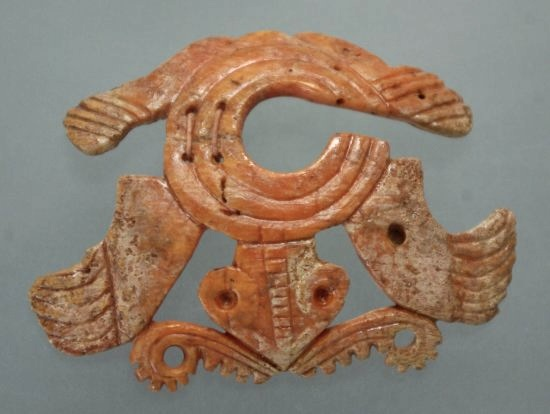
Turtle pendant, Playa de Venado, 500-1300 CE, shell, Dumbarton Oaks Museum, Washington, DC

Gran Coclé is an archaeological culture area in the south of in pre-Columbian Central America. This area used to be referred to as Lower Central America or the Intermediate Area, but these terms are now seen as out-dated. The area largely coincides with the modern-day Panamanian province of Coclé, and consisted of a number of identifiable native cultures. Archaeologists have loosely designated these cultures by pottery style. The poorly studied La Mula period ranged from 150 BC to AD 300. It was followed by the Tonosi period, from AD 300 to AD 550, and by the Cubita period, from AD 550 to AD 700. A unified Native American culture appears to have flourished in this area from approximately 1200 BC until the 16th century.

Archaeologists working at intervals since the 1920s have uncovered ruins and burials which contain striking artifacts. These include worked gold and other metals, carved bone, shell and whale ivory, textiles, jewelry with semi-precious stones and pottery. Coclé gold work was traded throughout the region, and has been found as far away as Chichen Itza in Yucatán. The large collection of Coclé pre-historic pottery is notable for strong structural design and the use of fish, bird, animal and human figures as decoration.

In the 1920s, at least one major archaeological site, Sitio Conte, was so badly damaged by an unprofessional excavator that much of its history is lost. In the 1930s and 1940, Sitio Conte was extensively excavated by Harvard archaeologist Samuel K. Lothrop and University of Pennsylvania archaeologist J. Alden Mason, each of whom published their findings. A modest museum on that site displays artifacts and site history. A second site, El Caño, was more professionally explored and provides valuable information about the Coclé culture. A portion of Coclé's archaeological sites have been designated as the Gran Coclé Culture Area. Harvard University's Peabody Museum of Archaeology and Ethnology, Cambridge, Massachusetts, published two major works, in 1937 and 1942 respectively, on later excavations in Coclé.
