= Piedras Gordas =

Coordinates: 8.6386°N 80.5114°W

- Corregimiento
- Location within Panama
- Country: Panama
- Province: Coclé
- District: La Pintada

Area
  - Land: 137.8 km^{2} (53.2 sq mi)

Population (2010)
  - Total: 4,164
  - Density: 30.2/km^{2} (78/sq mi)
- Population density calculated based on land area.
- Time zone: UTC−5 (EST)

Piedras Gordas is a corregimiento in La Pintada District, Coclé Province, Panama. It has a land area of 137.8 square kilometres (53.2 sq mi) and had a population of 4,164 as of 2010, giving it a population density of 30.2 inhabitants per square kilometre (78/sq mi). Its population as of 1990 was 3,648; its population as of 2000 was 3,638.

Part of the La Pintada district, Piedras Gordas is nestled in the Tabasará Mountains.
