= El Cristo, Coclé =

El Cristo
- Town and corregimiento
- Location within Panama
- Coordinates: 8°15′0″N 80°37′12″W
- Country: Panama
- Province: Coclé
- District: Aguadulce

Area
  - Land: 113 km^{2} (44 sq mi)

Population (2010)
  - Total: 4,017
  - Density: 35.5/km^{2} (92/sq mi)
- Population density calculated based on land area.
- Time zone: UTC−5 (EST)

El Cristo is a town and corregimiento in Aguadulce District, Coclé Province, Panama. It has a land area of 113 square kilometres (44 sq mi) and a population of 4,017 as of 2010, giving it a population density of 35.5 inhabitants per square kilometre (92/sq mi). Its population as of 1990 was 3,393; its population as of 2000 was 3,852.

El Cristo is one of the oldest towns in the region. In pre-Columbian times it was inhabited by an aboriginal community for a period of several centuries. According to studies by the archaeologist Cook, this community is similar to the pre-Columbian site of the Sierra at the edge of Santa Maria. The history of El Cristo goes back to the founding of Nata, by which time El Cristo was a cattle farm of the Spanish. The town is home to a Christmas tree, renowned for being the highest in Central America.
