= El Caño Archaeological Park =

Archaeological site in Panama

El Caño
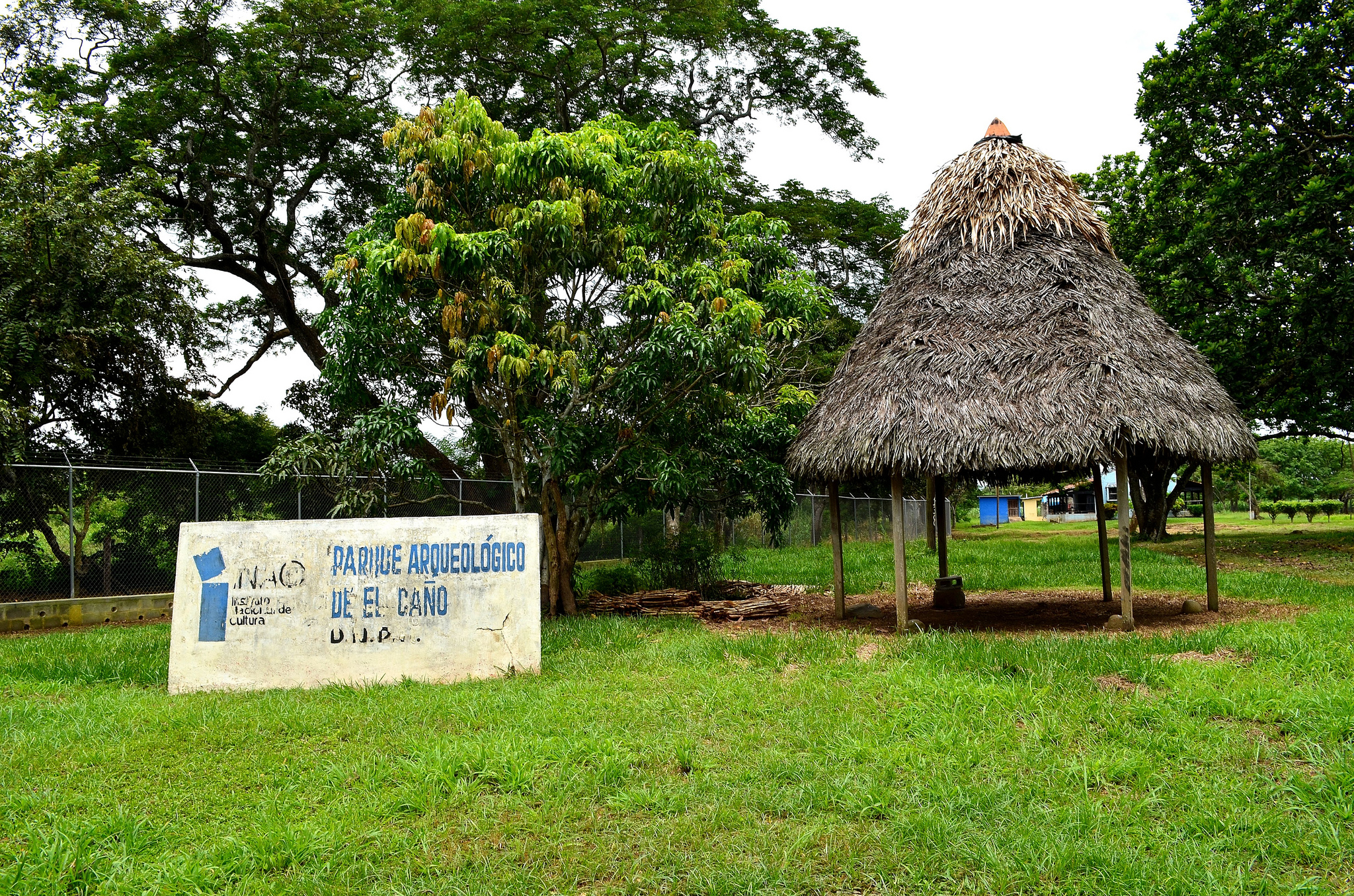
- Interactive map of El Caño
- Cultures: Gran Coclé
- Location: El Caño, Panama
- Region: Natá District, Coclé Province, Central America

Site notes
- Excavation dates: 1925-present
- Archaeologists: Julia Mayo
- Public access: Yes
- Website: oda-fec.org

El Caño is a pre-Columbian archaeological site and funerary complex in Coclé province, Panama, notable for its stone monuments, burial mounds, and evidence of complex social structures. Occupied from around 100–400 BC until Spanish colonization, the site has yielded elaborate burials, gold artifacts, and insights into the Gran Coclé culture.

Initial excavations began in the 1920s, with major discoveries in the 2000s revealing a necropolis of high-status individuals. Excavations are ongoing, and some artifacts from El Caño are housed in Panama City's Anthropology Museum.

== History ==
El Caño is a pre-Columbian archaeological site and funerary complex located near the Río Grande in the Natá district of Coclé province, Panama, approximately 176 kilometers southwest of Ciudad Panama. The site covers around 3.4 to 8 hectares and features stone structures including carved basalt and tuff columns, earthen mounds, canals, and burial sites. It lies within the Gran Coclé cultural region and is situated on fertile alluvial plains near an ancient volcano.

The earliest known occupation of El Caño dates from roughly 100 to 400 BC, with continuous habitation until the Spanish colonization in the 16th century. The site reflects a cultural evolution from more egalitarian social structures to hierarchical caciques, with evidence of political and social centers ruled by caciques engaged in gold and copper production.

=== Excavation of El Caño ===
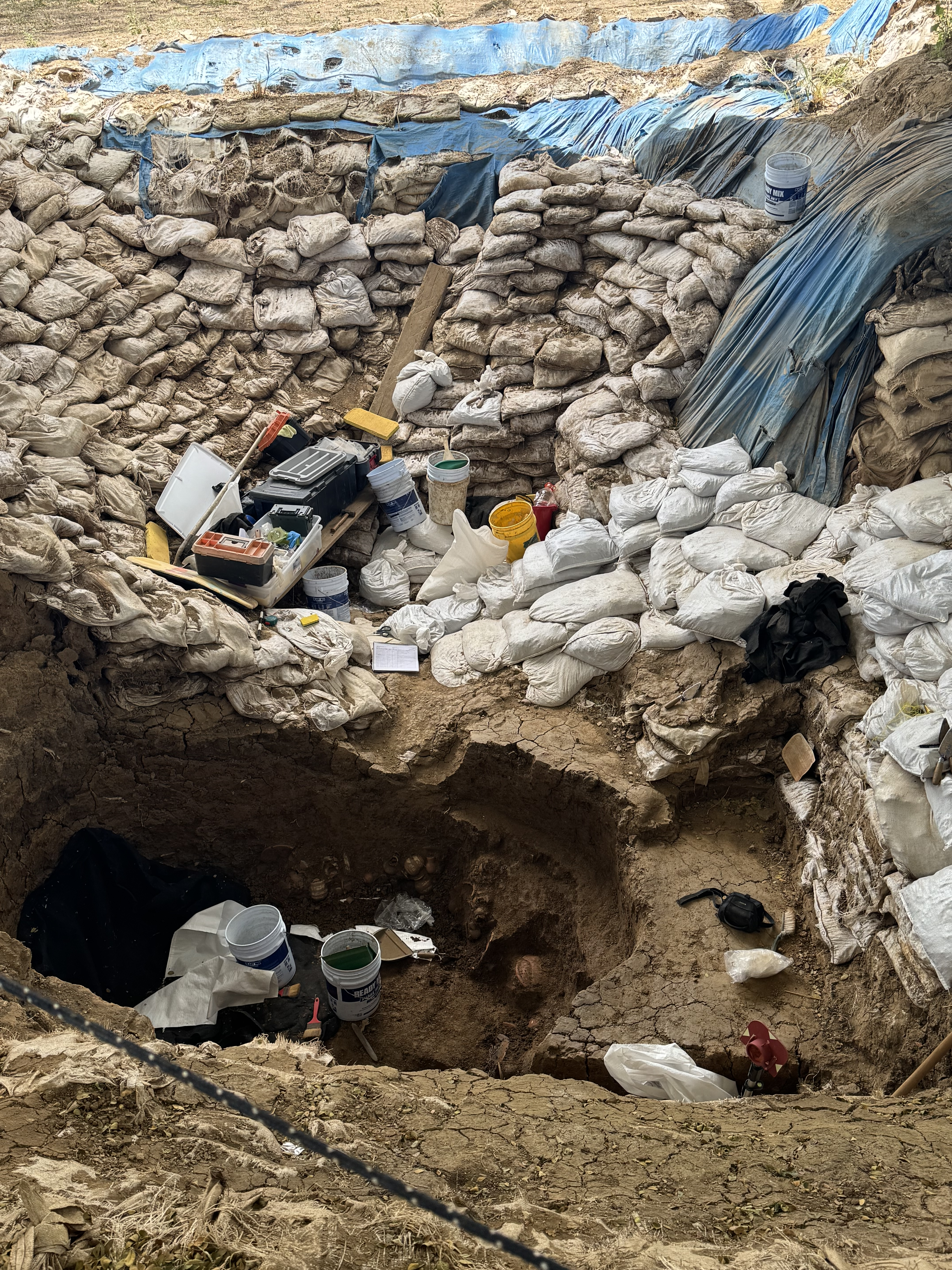
Excavation of the necropolis in El Caño Archaeological Park as of February 11, 2026

==== Background on Panamanian archaeology ====
As of 1979, the state of archaeological research in lower Central America, including Panama, was still largely unstudied and unexcavated, with a region stretching from eastern Honduras to eastern Panama. Archaeological work in Panama had focused mainly on ceramics and tribal classifications, often viewing the area as a corridor connecting Mesoamerica and the Andes, rather than as a region with its own historical significance. Most scientific and academic research in Panama before 1979 was outdated and limited, but newer studies by younger archaeologists began to investigate cultural processes rather than just mapping cultural areas.

==== 1925–1980 ====
In 1925, an American named Alpheus Hyatt Verrill found the stones. He dug several rough holes nearby, uncovering three skeletons of commoners. Systematic archaeological excavations began in 1926. Additional work occurred in the 1960s through 1980.

==== 2000s–present ====
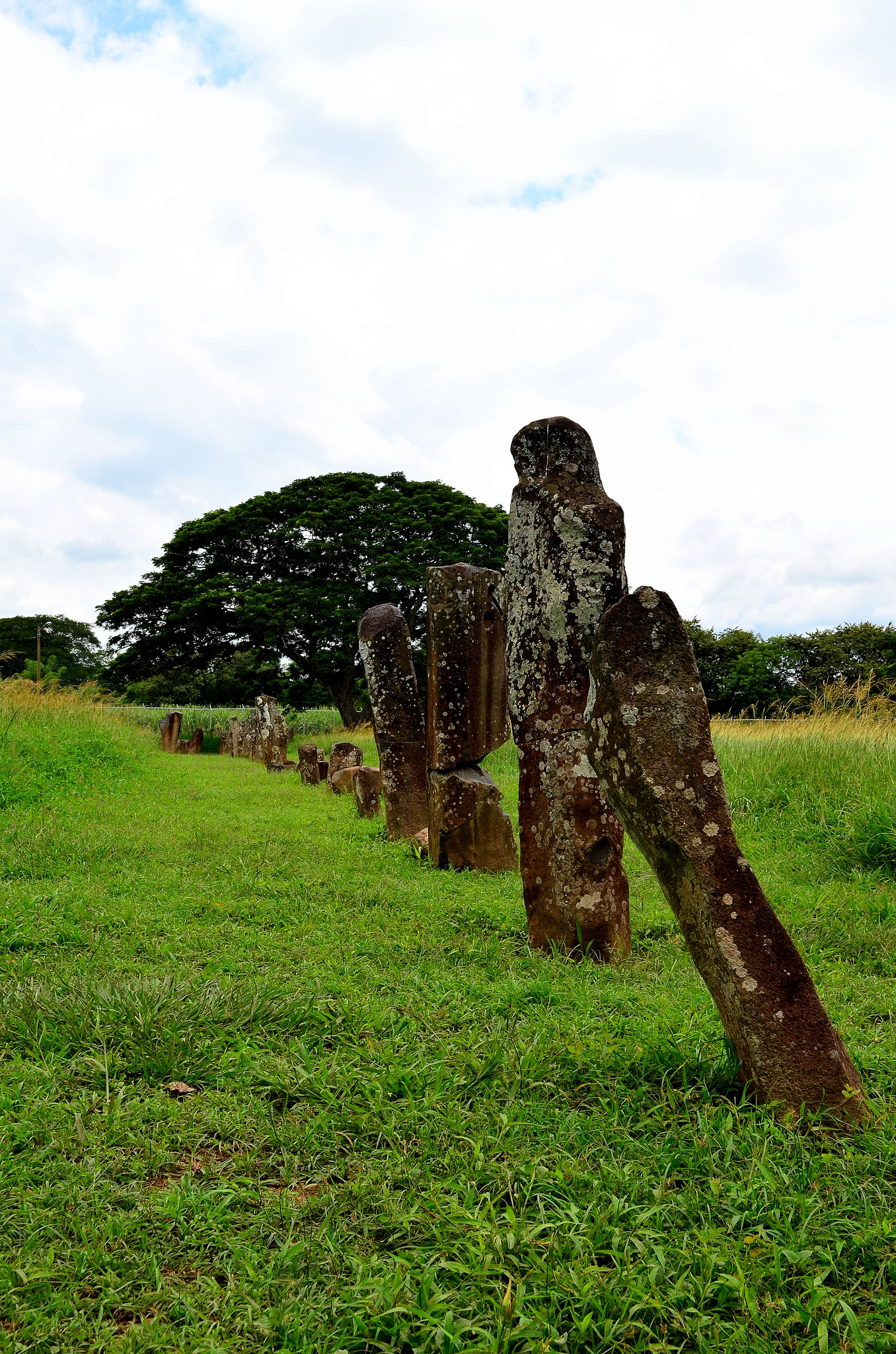
Stone monoliths found around El Caño, Panama. These monoliths are similar to the ones that originally prompted Hyatt Verrill to dig up three pre-Columbian graves along the Rio Grande River (Panama).

Renewed efforts starting in 2005 included geophysical surveys and excavations led by archaeologist Julia Mayo. Between 2008 and 2011, Mayo's team uncovered several elaborate burials dated from about 700 to 1000 AD, revealing a necropolis of high-status individuals from the Coclé culture. These burials included richly adorned warrior caciques accompanied by multiple other bodies, believed to be sacrificed captives or attendants.

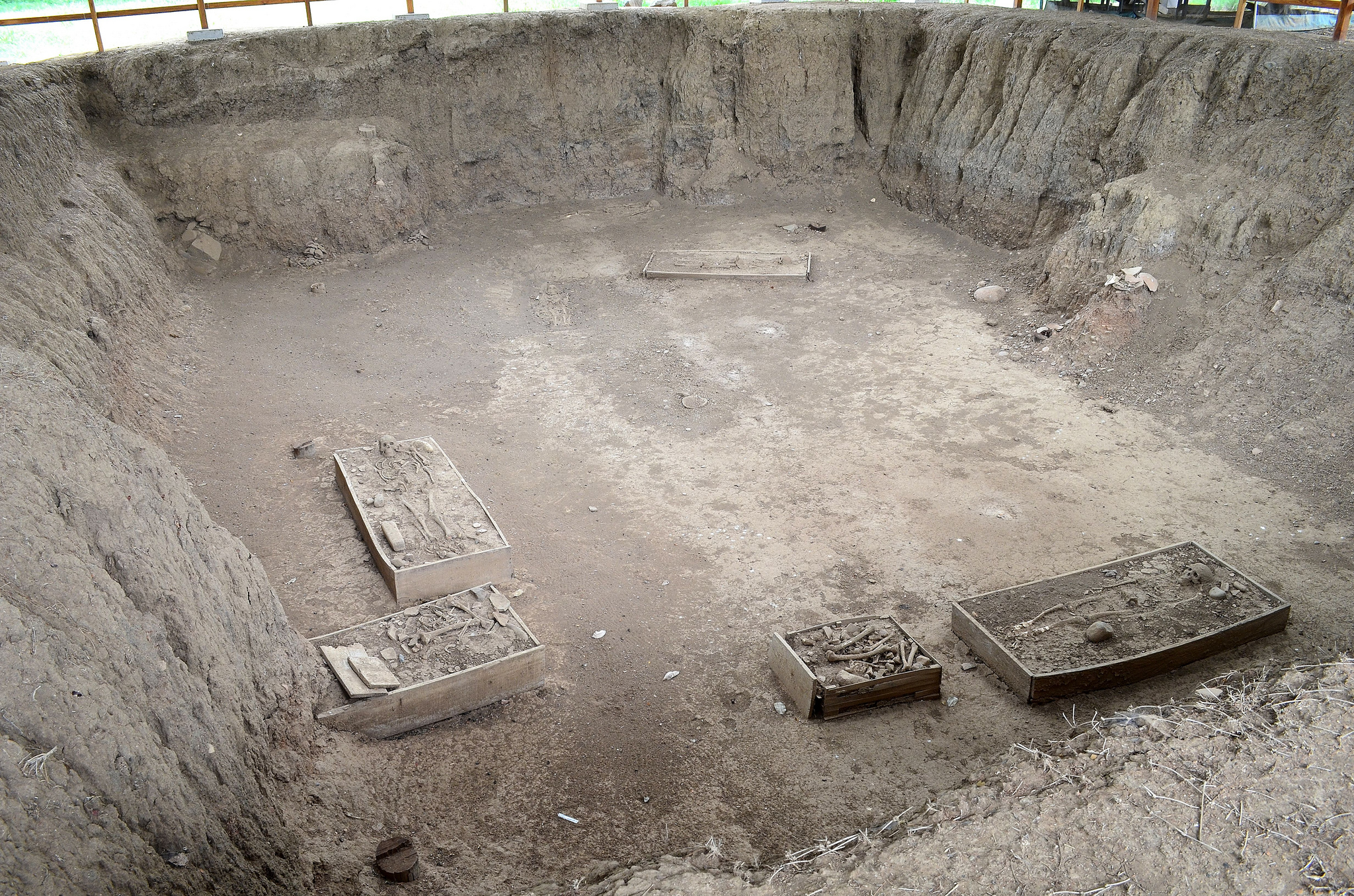
The skeletons placed in the excavation pit are meant to give visitors a perception where things were located when archaeologist were digging.

Notable discoveries include a cacique's tomb dated to around AD 900, containing numerous gold artifacts, including breastplates, bracelets, belts, pendants shaped like animals and humans, crocodile-shaped earrings, whale-tooth earrings, and bone flutes. One significant tomb, known as Tomb No. 9, contained the remains of a male leader buried face down atop a woman's body, with up to 31 additional individuals buried simultaneously. The gold artifacts indicate local mining and sophisticated craftsmanship.

Archaeobotanical studies, published in 2007, conducted on charcoal samples from the site have provided insight into the use of forest resources in funerary practices. These findings were correlated with historical Spanish accounts and ethnobotanical research from nearby areas.

The site is still under excavation, with estimates of about 20 more tombs remaining to be explored. Excavations have been supported by Panama's National Science and Technology Secretariat (SENACYT) and the Ministry of Culture, with ongoing projects continuing into the 2020s. There are artifacts recovered from El Caño are displayed in Panama City's Anthropology Museum.
