= Las Huacas =

Las Huacas may refer to:

- Las Huacas, Coclé, Panama
- Las Hucas, Veraguas, Panama
