= El Roble =

El Roble may refer to:

- El Roble, Coclé, Panama
- El Roble de Ilobasco, a Salvadoran football club
