= Pocrí =

Pocrí may refer to:

- Pocrí, Coclé, a corregimiento in Coclé Province, Panama
- Pocrí, Los Santos, capital of the Pocrí District, Los Santos province, Panama
- Pocrí District, a district of Los Santos Province, Panama
