= La Pintada District =

La Pintada
- District

- Location of the district capital in Panama
- Coordinates: 8°36′4″N 80°26′56″W
- Country: Panama
- Province: Coclé
- Capital: La Pintada

Area
  - Total: 1,030 km^{2} (400 sq mi)

Population (2000)
  - Total: 23,202
- Time zone: UTC-5 (ETZ)

La Pintada (Spanish pronunciation: [la pinˈtaða]) is a district (distrito) of Coclé Province in Panama. The population according to the 2000 census was 23,202. The district covers a total area of 1,030 km^{2}. The capital lies at the town of La Pintada.

== Administrative divisions ==
La Pintada District is divided administratively into the following corregimientos:

- La Pintada (capital)
- El Harino
- El Potrero
- Llano Grande
- Piedras Gordas
- Las Lomas
- Llano Norte
