= Llano Norte, Coclé =

Llano Norte
- Corregimiento
- Interactive map of Llano Norte
- Coordinates: 8.634°N 80.440°W
- Country: Panama
- Provinces: Coclé
- District: La Pintada
- Time zone: UTC−5 (EST)

Llano Norte is a corregimiento in Coclé Province in the Republic of Panama.
