= Toza =

Coordinates: 8.3500°N 80.6500°W

- Corregimiento
- Location within Panama
- Country: Panama
- Province: Coclé
- District: Natá

Area
  - Land: 85.8 km^{2} (33.1 sq mi)

Population (2010)
  - Total: 2,071
  - Density: 24.1/km^{2} (62/sq mi)
- Population density calculated based on land area.
- Time zone: UTC−5 (EST)

Toza is a corregimiento in Natá District, Coclé Province, Panama. It has a land area of 85.8 square kilometres (33.1 sq mi) and had a population of 2,071 as of 2010, giving it a population density of 24.1 inhabitants per square kilometre (62/sq mi). Its population as of 1990 was 1,666; its population as of 2000 was 1,884.
