= Llano Grande, Coclé =

Corregimiento in Coclé Province, Panama

Coordinates: 8.6333°N 80.4500°W

Llano Grande
- Corregimiento
- Location within Panama
- Country: Panama
- Province: Coclé
- District: La Pintada

Area
  - Land: 395.5 km^{2} (152.7 sq mi)

Population (2010)
  - Total: 6,901
  - Density: 17.4/km^{2} (45/sq mi)
- Population density calculated based on land area.
- Time zone: UTC−5 (EST)

Llano Grande is a corregimiento in La Pintada District, Coclé Province, Panama. It has a land area of 395.5 square kilometres (152.7 sq mi) and had a population of 6,901 as of 2010, giving it a population density of 17.4 inhabitants per square kilometre (45/sq mi). Its population as of 1990 was 4,816; its population as of 2000 was 6,026.
