= Manuel José Hurtado =

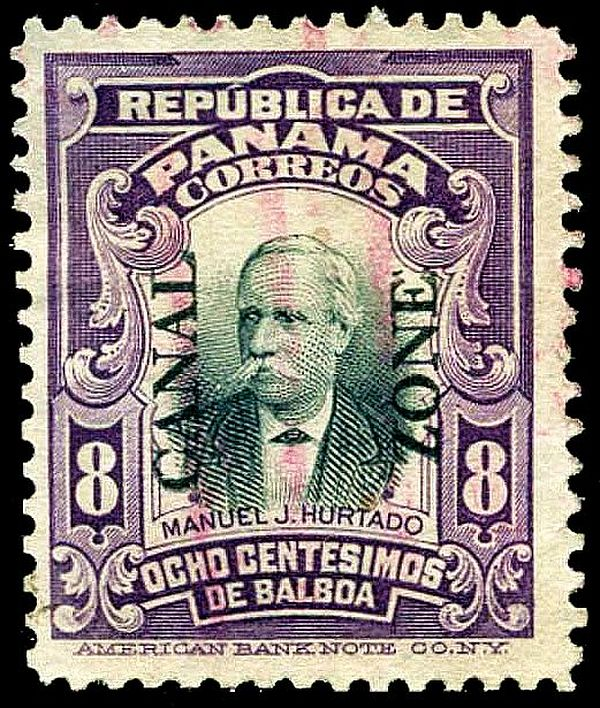
- Commemorative stamp of Manuel J. Hurtado (1909)
- Born: December 1, 1821; Panama, Gran Colombia
- Died: August 8, 1887 (aged 65); Panama, Colombia
- Occupations: Educator, Engineer
- Parent(s): Manuel José Hurtado and María del Carmen Díaz Campo

Manuel José Hurtado (Panama, December 1, 1821 - August 8, 1887) was a Panamanian educator and engineer. He studied humanities in England and completed his degree in civil engineering in Paris. He devoted himself to commerce and the practice of his profession, representing the Isthmus Department before the Government of New Granada on several occasions.

A patron of schools and colleges, he was a professor of natural and exact sciences. His successful innovations to modernize education led the government to appoint him Director General of Public Instruction. He founded schools, colleges, the Normal School for boys, and others for girls, which produced the first Panamanian teachers.

Due to his generosity and commitment to popular education, he has been called the “Father of Public Education in the Isthmus,” and December 1, his birthday, was declared Teachers' Day in Panama. An award, the Order of Manuel José Hurtado, is named after him.
