= Cano =

Cano is a surname of Spanish origin. People with surname Cano include:

- Alfonso Cano (1948–2011), Chief of the Revolutionary Armed Forces of Colombia
- Alfredo Virginio Cano (born 1982), Argentine retired footballer
- Alonso Cano (1601–1667), Spanish painter
- Ana Cano (born 1950), Spanish philologist
- Antonio Cano (1779–1840), sculptor, architect, and lay friar of the Kingdom of Sardinia
- Ciriaco Cano (born 1948), Spanish footballer
- Emilia Cano (born 1968), Spanish race walker
- Fanny Cano (1944–1983), Mexican actress and producer
- Francisco Cano, Conquistador
- Gabriel Cano de Aponte (1665–1733), Lieutenant General
- Germán Cano (born 1988), Argentine footballer
- Guillermo Cano Isaza (1925–1986), Colombian journalist
- Joaquín Gutiérrez Cano (1920–2009), Spanish diplomat and politician
- Jennifer Johnson Cano, American mezzo-soprano
- Jesús Arango Cano (1915–2015), Colombian anthropologist, archaeologist and writer
- José Canó (born 1962), Dominican baseball player
- José Manuel Cano (born 1965), Argentine politician
- José María Cano (born 1959), Spanish singer and songwriter
- José Ortega Cano (born 1953), Spanish bullfighter
- Joselyn Cano (1990–2020), American model
- Juan Manuel Cano (born 1987), Argentine racewalker
- Juan de la Cruz Ramos Cano, former footballer and manager
- Leopoldo Cano (1844–1934), Spanish soldier, poet and playwright
- Lucas Cano (born 1995), Argentine footballer
- Magdaleno Cano (1933–2009), Mexican cyclist
- Malena Cano, ranchera and mariachi singer
- Matías Cano (born 1986), Argentine footballer
- Melchior Cano, Spanish theologian
- Óscar Cano (born 1972), Spanish football manager
- Raúl Tito (born Raúl Alexánder Tito Cano; 1997), Peruvian footballer
- Ricardo Cano (born 1951), Argentine tennis player
- Ricardo Obregón Cano (1917–2016), Argentine politician
- Robinson Canó (born 1982), Dominican baseball player; son of baseball player José Canó
- Rubén Cano (born 1951), Argentine-Spanish retired footballer
- Sandra Cano, American politician
- Yennier Canó (born 1994), Cuban baseball player

== See also ==
- Juan Sebastián Elcano (1476–1526), Basque navigator, ship-owner and explorer who completed the first circumnavigation of the world by taking charge after Ferdinand Magellan was killed
