= Chiguirí Arriba =

- Corregimiento
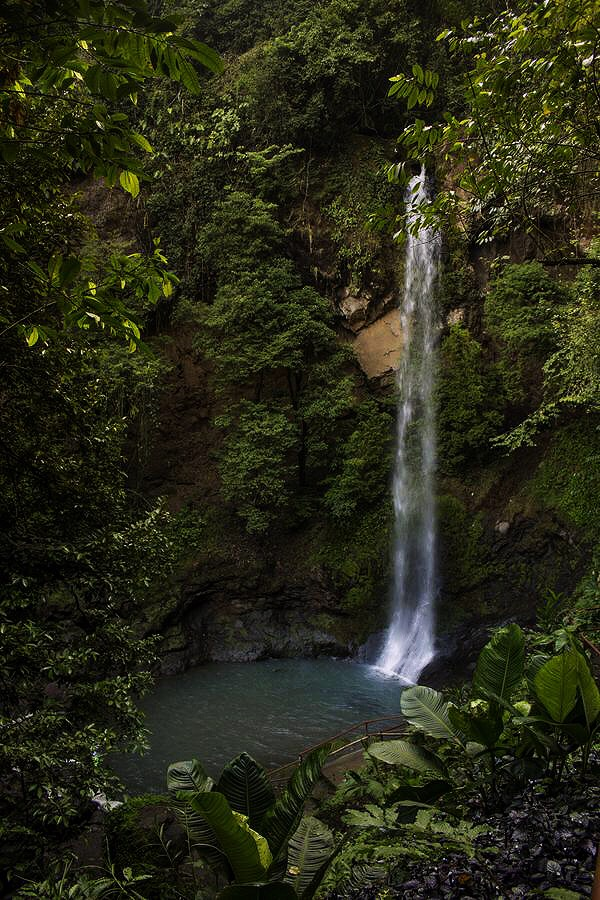
- Chiguirí Arriba in 2020

- Location within Panama
- Coordinates: 8°40′12″N 80°10′48″W
- Country: Panama
- Province: Coclé
- District: Penonomé

Area
  - Land: 202.9 km^{2} (78.3 sq mi)

Population (2010)
  - Total: 10,018
  - Density: 49.4/km^{2} (128/sq mi)
- Population density calculated based on land area.
- Time zone: UTC−5 (EST)

Chiguirí Arriba is a corregimiento in Penonomé District, Coclé Province, Panama with a population of 10,018 as of 2010. Its population as of 1990 was 7,459; its population as of 2000 was 8,581.
