= Natá, Coclé =

Town and corregimiento in Coclé, Panama

Natá
- Town and corregimiento
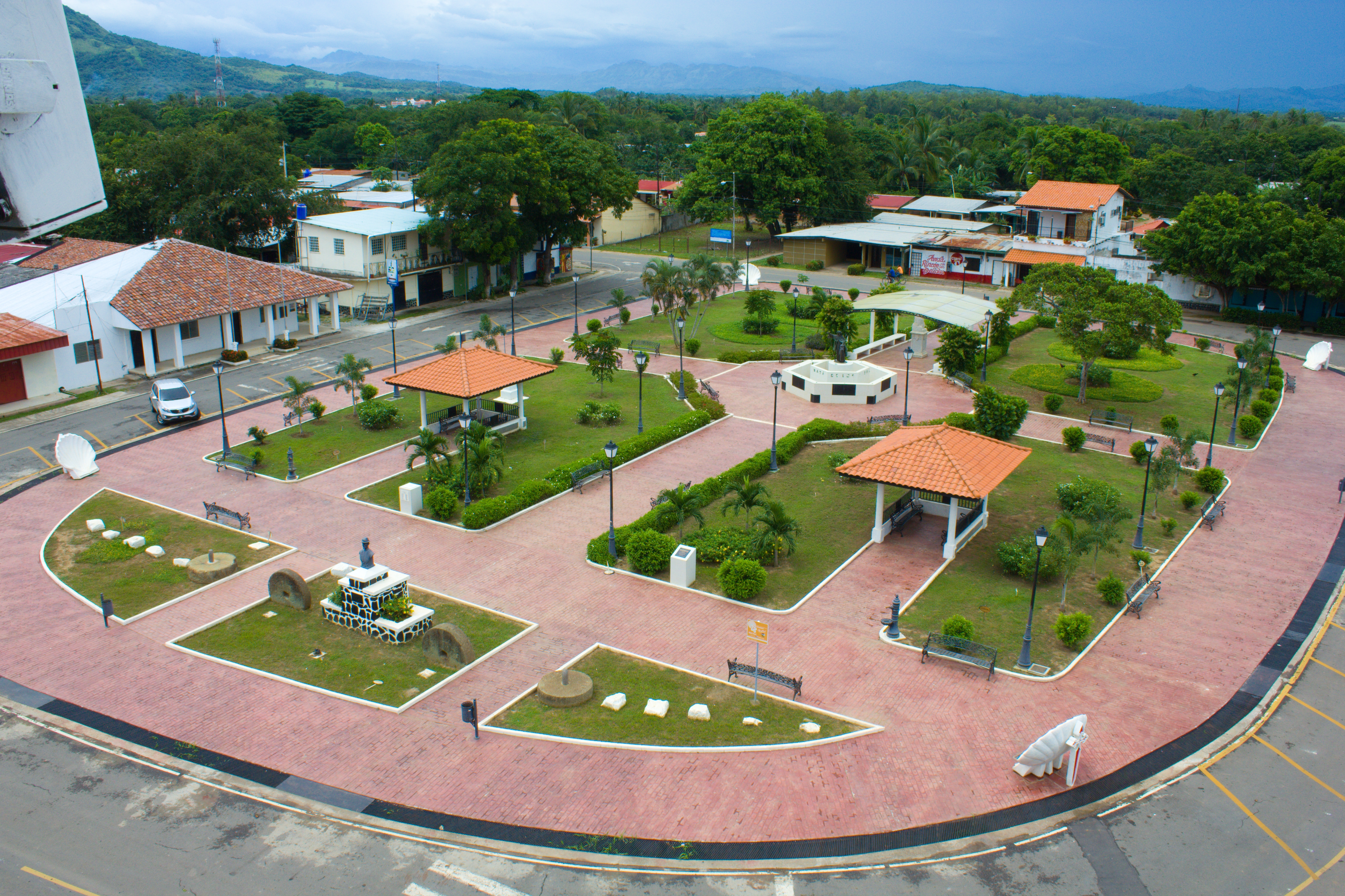
- Main Square, Nata

- Flag

- Location within Panama
- Coordinates: 8°19′48″N 80°31′12″W
- Country: Panama
- Province: Coclé

Area
  - Land: 174.7 km^{2} (67.5 sq mi)

Population (2010)
  - Total: 6,003
  - Density: 34.4/km^{2} (89/sq mi)
- Population density calculated based on land area.
- Time zone: UTC−5 (EST)

Natá is a town and corregimiento on the Pan-American Highway in Natá District, Coclé Province, Panama. It is the seat of Natá District. Its population as of 2010 was 6,003 as of 2010. The closest larger city is Penonomé. The city of Aguadulce is about 10 kilometers away. The small town has a primary school, high school, bank, post office, and pharmacy.

== History ==
The town is the third oldest surviving town in Panama, having been founded by the Spanish on May 20, 1522, after Nombre de Dios and Panama City. It is the second oldest town founded by Europeans on the Pacific coast after Panama City. The full name of this historical city is Natá de Los Caballeros, where Natá is commemorating local cacique Anata and "Los Caballeros", 100 Spanish knights quartered in the city.

It is home to a church which claims to be the oldest church still in Tierra Firme. The church was thought to be built when Spanish invaders originally came through Central America conquering the Native Indian tribes. The church is believed to be from the 16th century. Currently, the church is in good condition, the roof was recently repaired with Nispero an extremely hardy and insect proof wood. thanks to care from the residents and frequent restorations. The church is used by residents of Natá every day for Catholic mass and festivals for the town.

Natá's population as of 1990 was 5,158; its population as of 2000 was 5,902.
