= El Coco, Coclé =

Coordinates: 8.3528°N 80.3972°W

El Coco
- Corregimiento
- Location within Panama
- Country: Panama
- Province: Coclé
- District: Penonomé

Area
  - Land: 146.3 km^{2} (56.5 sq mi)

Population (2010)
  - Total: 5,605
  - Density: 38.3/km^{2} (99/sq mi)
- Population density calculated based on land area.
- Time zone: UTC−5 (EST)

El Coco is a corregimiento in Penonomé District, Coclé Province, Panama with a population of 5,605 as of 2010. Its population as of 1990 was 3,558; its population as of 2000 was 4,592.
