= Battle of Aguadulce =

Battle during the Thousand Days War

Coordinates: 8.240°N 80.540°W

- Part of Thousand Days War
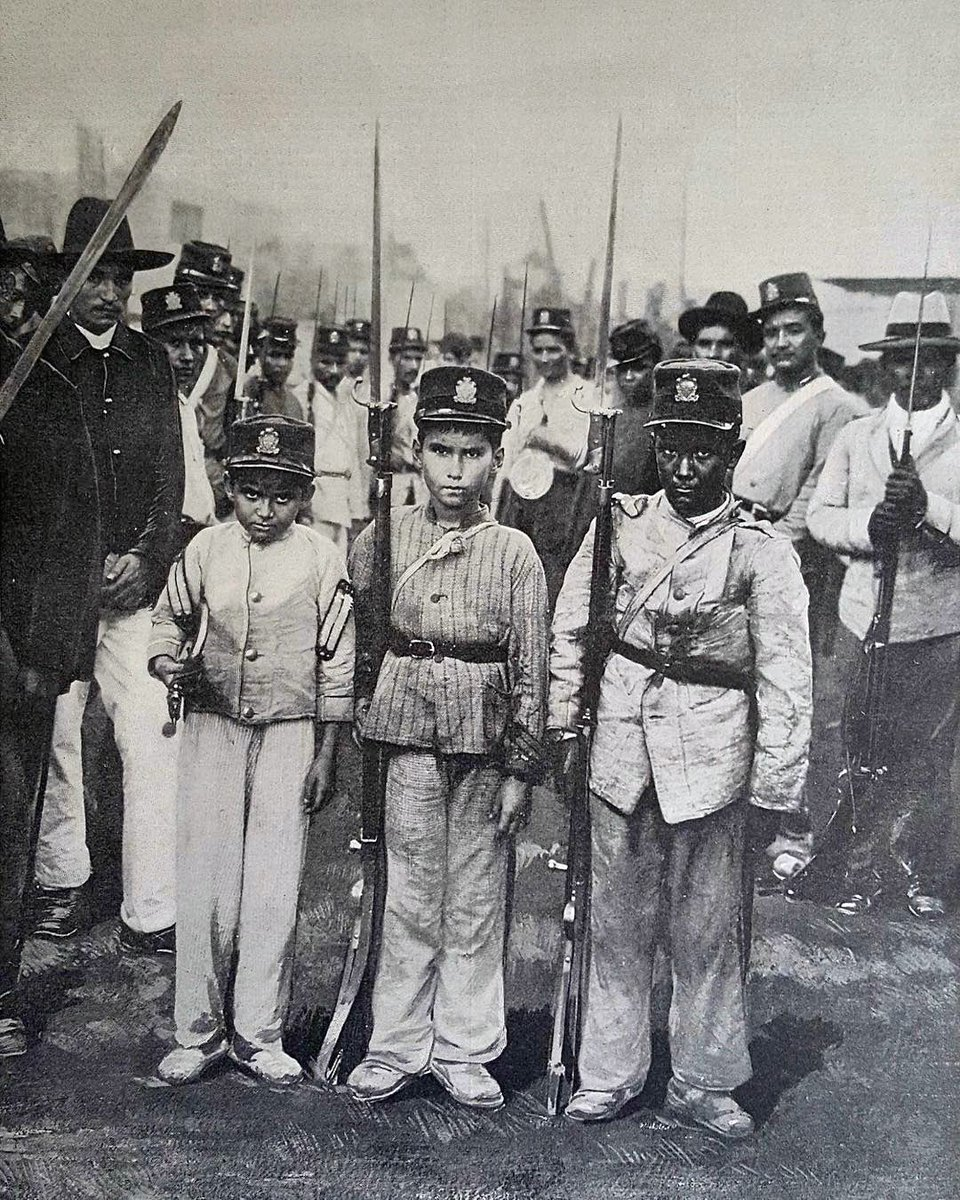
- Children recruited in the department of Panama
| Date | 23 February – 27 August 1901 |
| Location | Aguadulce, Panama |
| Result | Liberal victory |

Belligerents
| Liberals | Conservatives |

Commanders and leaders
| Benjamin Herrera | Francisco Castro |

Strength
| 1,000 | 6,000 |

Casualties and losses
| Unknown | 3,000 killed & wounded 3,313 captured (13 generals, 300 officers, & 3,000 soldiers) |

The battle of Aguadulce took place during the Colombian Thousand Days' War, between Liberals and Conservatives. It occurred between February 23 and August 27, 1901, and ended in an overwhelming victory on the part of the Liberal army under the command of General Benjamin Herrera over the Conservative army based in the city of Aguadulce, Coclé under the command of General Francisco Castro.

== First engagement ==
In January 1901 General Benjamín Herrera accompanied by Belisario Porras Barahona and Victoriano Lorenzo arrived in the city of Aguadulce and demanded the surrender of the Conservative forces defending the city. The Conservative army refused. Thus, on 23 February 1901, began a bloody battle that finished with the taking of Vigía hill and the defeat of the Conservative forces under the command of General Castro (who managed to escape with some of his officials before the battle finished).

== Second engagement ==
Later, in the month of June, the Conservative government sent a much larger force to recapture the city. This operation was much more properly planned than the earlier defense of the city. The planned involved on a force, led by General Luis Morales Berti, to advance from the locality of Anton towards Aguadulce, while the other, led by General Francisco Castro, to advance from the west and to complete the pincer. However, General Castro preferred to move on Anton and to unite his forces with those of General Berti. This error was taken advantage of by the Liberal forces, who used the extra time to escape.

== Siege ==
General Herrera proposed a very elaborate plan to retake the city. General Herrera moved to the Padilla stream, which led to Aguadulce, which would be his base of operations. In doing this, Herrera and his army executed a systematic cut of the communication and supply lines of Aguadulce. Thus, Aguadulce was besieged by Herrera and his army. This brilliant military maneuver brought the city to its knees. More than half of the Conservative defenders became casualties due to hunger, fever, and dysentery during the 29-day siege. Due to the supply situation and incessant raids by the besieging army, General Berti finally surrendered Aguadulce on August 27, 1901, under severe conditions put forward by the Liberals. In total 13 generals, 300 officers and more than 3,000 soldiers, as well as a large amount of weapons, were surrendered to the Liberal forces.

The siege of Aguadulce is considered a jewel of military strategy due to its planning and execution. A Liberal army of barely 1,000 men was able to besiege and defeat an army that was more experienced and with around 6,000 men. With this victory, the Liberals were able to secure their hold on the Isthmus of Panama until the end of the war.
