= Capellanía =

- Corregimiento
- Location within Panama
- Coordinates: 8°18′0″N 80°33′0″W
- Country: Panama
- Province: Coclé
- District: Natá

Area
  - Land: 102.3 km^{2} (39.5 sq mi)

Population (2010)
  - Total: 4,512
  - Density: 44.1/km^{2} (114/sq mi)
- Population density calculated based on land area.
- Time zone: UTC−5 (EST)

Capellanía is a corregimiento in Natá District, Coclé Province, Panama. It has a land area of 102.3 square kilometres (39.5 sq mi) and had a population of 4,512 as of 2010, giving it a population density of 44.1 inhabitants per square kilometre (114/sq mi). Its population as of 1990 was 3,817; its population as of 2000 was 4,396.
