= Penonomé District =

Penonomé
- District

- Location of the district capital in Panama
- Coordinates: 8°31′7″N 80°21′19″W
- Country: Panama
- Province: Coclé
- Capital: Penonomé

Area
  - Total: 1,708.6 km^{2} (659.7 sq mi)

Population (2010 census)
  - Total: 85,737
  - Density: 50.180/km^{2} (129.96/sq mi)
- Time zone: UTC-5 (ETZ)

Penonomé is a district (distrito) of Coclé Province in Panama. The population according to the 2000 census was 72,448. The district covers a total area of 1700 km^{2}.

The capital of the district is the city of Penonomé, and Penonome is also the capital city of the province of Coclé. This province starts in the salt plains and Pacific coast, crosses sugar cane fields and reaches impressive waterfalls and mountain tops where orchids grow. In total, the province of Cocle covers almost 12,000 square kilometers and has a population of over 200,000. The province is the agricultural center for Panama and a producer of sugar, salt, tomatoes, coffee, rice, onions and oranges. Cocle is also a favorite place for travelers and includes the largest beach resorts in the Pacific Ocean, around its coastal areas of more than 100 kilometers.

== History and culture ==
The Penonomeña population was established by Diego Lopez de Villanueva y Zapata, Auditor and Prosecutor of the Royal Court of Panama on April 30, 1581. According to some chroniclers, the population owes its name to the cacique Penonomé or Panonomé, but through the years there is another legendary version that tells that the cacique Nomé, who fought against the Spanish troops of the conqueror Badajoz, died in that place. Nome died for cruelties suffered, pursued by Badajoz to be forced to say where he kept his riches.

Penonomé grew around the plaza of a Spanish colonial church. The community served as an important stop for merchants moving along the historic Las Cruces road. In 1671, after the capital of Panama (then located where the monumental complex of Panama La Vieja is today) was destroyed by the privateer Henry Morgan and others, Penonome served as the capital of the department of Panama, until its new seat was established in 1673, in the township of San Felipe, also known as "Casco Antiguo".

There is a rich indigenous history in Penonome and its surroundings, especially in the colonial town of La Pintada, which is full of hieroglyphs and huacas, sites that used to kept the remains of the indigenous people, along with valuable pieces of gold and pottery. Some of the most important archaeological discoveries indicate that this area has more than 600 years of history prior to the arrival of the Spaniards.

Among other attractions of the area, we must mention the quality of life in contact with nature, its cost, as well as the value of the properties. Beautiful lands and unique properties can be obtained at exceptional prices. The carnivals of Penonomé, are characterized by having samba groups, roots that came through the Berrocal family, which represented the Cascabeleros, a group that played samba styles from Brazil, today there are four consolidated groups called: New Cascabeleros, Corsarios, Acuarios and the revelation Portelo Do Zaratí of Doctor Ricardo Jaén.

== Economy ==
According to the Ministerio de Comercio e Industrias Dirección Regional de Coclé, Departamento de Comercio Interior, there are a total of 694 commercial establishments in the District of Penonomé, of which 449 are wholesale establishments and the remaining 245 are retail establishments. In rural communities there are grocery stores, stores and kiosks. According to economic activity, they are located as follows: 86 canteens, 77 mini supermarkets, 70 kiosks, 41 grocery stores, 30 stores, among the most prominent retail sales.

The service sector is represented by 78 hotel and restaurant establishments in the district. In the real estate, business and rental activity, it has 58 establishments. Transportation, storage and communication activity, 9 establishments.

There are 58 establishments identified as other services, which include teaching activities, social services, health, other community, social and personal service activities.

Another economic activity that contributes to the district's economy is handicrafts, which play an important role in the culture of the Penonomeño.

== Administrative divisions ==
Penonomé District is divided administratively into the following corregimientos:

- Penonomé (capital)
- Cañaveral
- Coclé
- Chiguirí Arriba
- El Coco
- Pajonal
- Río Grande
- Río Indio
- Toabré
- Tulú
- El Valle de San Miguel
- Vista Hermosa
- Los Uveros
- El Silencio

== See also ==
- Diocese of Penonomé
