= El Harino =

Coordinates: 8.6167°N 80.5667°W

- Corregimiento
- Location within Panama
- Country: Panama
- Province: Coclé
- District: La Pintada

Area
  - Land: 252.1 km^{2} (97.3 sq mi)

Population (2010)
  - Total: 5,455
  - Density: 21.6/km^{2} (56/sq mi)
- Population density calculated based on land area.
- Time zone: UTC−5 (EST)

El Harino is a corregimiento in La Pintada District, Coclé Province, Panama. It has a land area of 252.1 square kilometres (97.3 sq mi) and had a population of 5,455 as of 2010, giving it a population density of 21.6 inhabitants per square kilometre (56/sq mi). Its population as of 1990 was 6,520; its population as of 2000 was 6,990.
