= Barrios Unidos, Coclé =

Coordinates: 8.2017°N 80.5158°W

Barrios Unidos
- Corregimiento
- Location within Panama
- Country: Panama
- Province: Coclé
- District: Aguadulce
- Established: July 29, 1998

Area
  - Land: 64.5 km^{2} (24.9 sq mi)

Population (2010)
  - Total: 9,390
  - Density: 145.5/km^{2} (377/sq mi)
- Population density calculated based on land area.
- Time zone: UTC−5 (EST)

Barrios Unidos is a corregimiento in Aguadulce District, Coclé Province, Panama. It has a land area of 64.5 square kilometres (24.9 sq mi) and had a population of 9,390 as of 2010, giving it a population density of 145.5 inhabitants per square kilometre (377/sq mi). It was created by Law 58 of July 29, 1998, owing to the Declaration of Unconstitutionality of Law 1 of 1982. Its population as of 2000 was 8,610.
