= Santa Clara, Coclé =

Santa Clara
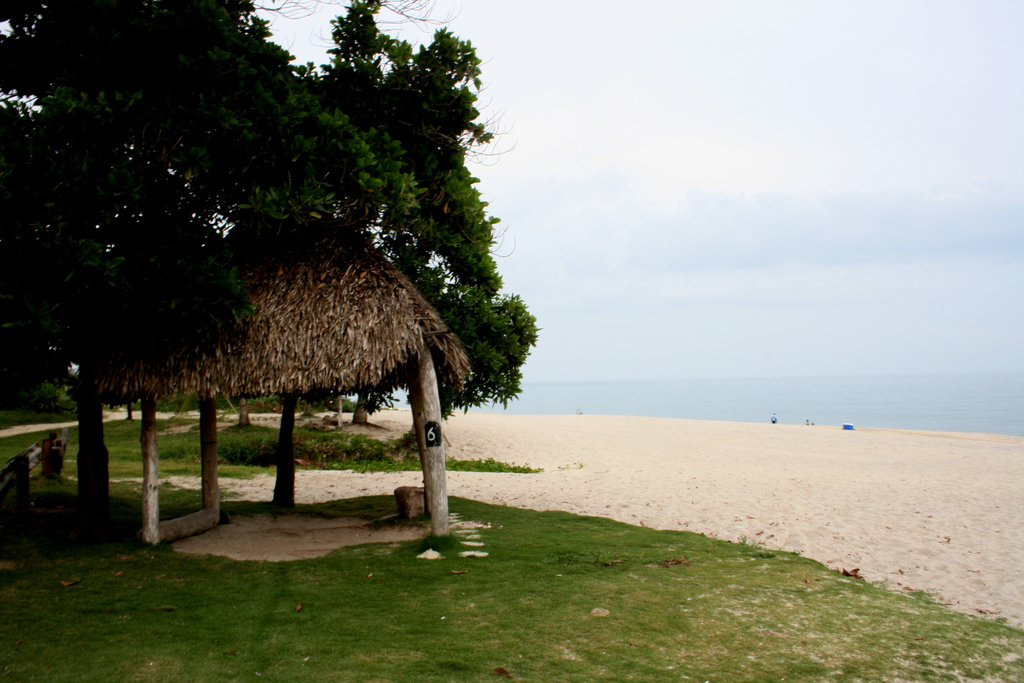

- Location within Panama
- Coordinates: 8.381525°N 80.106554°W
- Country: Panama
- Province: Coclé

Santa Clara is a beach town in Coclé Province, Panama. The settlement is a small fishing village with tourist lodgings and Panamanians' weekend homes. It is located just off the Inter-American Highway, 11 km southwest of the El Valle turnoff and 100 km southwest of Panama City. The closest town is beach resort Farallón. Santa Clara's stretch of white sand beach is relatively uncrowded, and there are more locals and fewer tourists in Santa Clara than at other nearby beaches.
