= Olá =

- Corregimiento
- Location within Panama
- Coordinates: 8°25′12″N 80°38′24″W
- Country: Panama
- Province: Coclé
- District: Olá

Area
  - Land: 80.7 km^{2} (31.2 sq mi)

Population (2010)
  - Total: 1,419
  - Density: 17.6/km^{2} (46/sq mi)
- Population density calculated based on land area.
- Time zone: UTC−5 (EST)

Olá is a corregimiento in Olá District, Coclé Province, Panama with a population of 1,419 as of 2010. It is the seat of Olá District. Its population as of 1990 was 1,255; its population as of 2000 was 1,326.
