= El Palmar, Coclé =

Coordinates: 8.5833°N 80.7000°W

El Palmar
- Corregimiento
- Location within Panama
- Country: Panama
- Province: Coclé
- District: Olá

Area
  - Land: 111.3 km^{2} (43.0 sq mi)

Population (2010)
  - Total: 1,256
  - Density: 11.3/km^{2} (29/sq mi)
- Population density calculated based on land area.
- Time zone: UTC−5 (EST)

El Palmar is a corregimiento in Olá District, Coclé Province, Panama with a population of 1,256 as of 2010. Its population as of 1990 was 1,808; its population as of 2000 was 1,437.
