= Pajonal =

Coordinates: 8.5942°N 80.2550°W

- Corregimiento
- Location within Panama
- Country: Panama
- Province: Coclé
- District: Penonomé

Area
  - Land: 145.1 km^{2} (56.0 sq mi)

Population (2010)
  - Total: 13,565
  - Density: 93.5/km^{2} (242/sq mi)
- Population density calculated based on land area.
- Time zone: UTC−5 (EST)

Pajonal is a corregimiento in Penonomé District, Coclé Province, Panama with a population of 13,565 as of 2010. Its population as of 1990 was 10,232; its population as of 2000 was 12,097.
