= La Pava =

- Corregimiento
- Location within Panama
- Country: Panama
- Province: Coclé
- District: Olá

Area
  - Land: 87.3 km^{2} (33.7 sq mi)

Population (2010)
  - Total: 1,444
  - Density: 16.5/km^{2} (43/sq mi)
- Population density calculated based on land area.
- Time zone: UTC−5 (EST)

La Pava is a corregimiento in Olá District, Coclé Province, Panama with a population of 1,444 as of 2010. Its population as of 1990 was 1,173; its population as of 2000 was 1,297.
