= Tulú =

Coordinates: 8.7667°N 80.4000°W

- Corregimiento
- Location within Panama
- Country: Panama
- Province: Coclé
- District: Penonomé

Area
  - Land: 192.2 km^{2} (74.2 sq mi)

Population (2010)
  - Total: 4,624
  - Density: 24.1/km^{2} (62/sq mi)
- Population density calculated based on land area.
- Time zone: UTC−5 (EST)

Tulú is a corregimiento in Penonomé District, Coclé Province, Panama with a population of 4,624 as of 2010. Its population as of 1990 was 3,923; its population as of 2000 was 4,294.
