= Las Lomas, Coclé =

Coordinates: 8.5000°N 80.3833°W

Las Lomas
- Corregimiento
- Location within Panama
- Country: Panama
- Province: Coclé
- District: La Pintada
- Established: December 5, 2002

Area
  - Land: 86.1 km^{2} (33.2 sq mi)

Population (2010)
  - Total: 2,072
  - Density: 24.1/km^{2} (62/sq mi)
- Population density calculated based on land area.
- Time zone: UTC−5 (EST)

Las Lomas is a corregimiento in La Pintada District, Coclé Province, Panama. It has a land area of 86.1 square kilometres (33.2 sq mi) and had a population of 2,072 as of 2010, giving it a population density of 24.1 inhabitants per square kilometre (62/sq mi). It was created by Law 56 of December 5, 2002.
