= Río Grande, Coclé =

Coordinates: 8.4167°N 80.4667°W

Río Grande
- Corregimiento
- Location within Panama
- Country: Panama
- Province: Coclé
- District: Penonomé

Area
  - Land: 93.2 km^{2} (36.0 sq mi)

Population (2010)
  - Total: 3,117
  - Density: 33.4/km^{2} (87/sq mi)
- Population density calculated based on land area.
- Time zone: UTC−5 (EST)

Río Grande is a corregimiento in Penonomé District, Coclé Province, Panama with a population of 3,117 as of 2010. Its population as of 1990 was 2,411; its population as of 2000 was 2,915.
