= El Picacho (Panama) =

Coordinates: 8.5833°N 80.5000°W

- Corregimiento
- Location within Panama
- Country: Panama
- Province: Coclé
- District: Olá

Area
  - Land: 29.7 km^{2} (11.5 sq mi)

Population (2010)
  - Total: 331
  - Density: 11.1/km^{2} (29/sq mi)
- Population density calculated based on land area.
- Time zone: UTC−5 (EST)

El Picacho is a corregimiento in Olá District, Coclé Province, Panama with a population of 331 as of 2010. Its population as of 1990 was 307; its population as of 2000 was 348.
