= Toabré, Panama =

Coordinates: 8.6667°N 80.3167°W

Toabré
- Corregimiento
- Location within Panama
- Country: Panama
- Province: Coclé
- District: Penonomé

Area
  - Land: 399.5 km^{2} (154.2 sq mi)

Population (2010)
  - Total: 10,203
  - Density: 25.5/km^{2} (66/sq mi)
- Population density calculated based on land area.
- Time zone: UTC−5 (EST)

Toabré is a corregimiento in Penonomé District, Coclé Province, Panama with a population of 10,203 as of 2010. Its population as of 1990 was 8,975; its population as of 2000 was 9,534.
