= Guzmán, Coclé =

Coordinates: 8.5167°N 80.5833°W

Guzmán
- Corregimiento
- Location within Panama
- Country: Panama
- Province: Coclé
- District: Natá

Area
  - Land: 66.1 km^{2} (25.5 sq mi)

Population (2010)
  - Total: 943
  - Density: 14.3/km^{2} (37/sq mi)
- Population density calculated based on land area.
- Time zone: UTC−5 (EST)

Guzmán is a corregimiento in Natá District, Coclé Province, Panama. It has a land area of 66.1 square kilometres (25.5 sq mi) and had a population of 943 as of 2010, giving it a population density of 14.3 inhabitants per square kilometre (37/sq mi). Its population as of 1990 was 839; its population as of 2000 was 936.
