= Coclé, Coclé =

Coordinates: 8.4500°N 80.4333°W

Coclé
- Corregimiento
- Location within Panama
- Country: Panama
- Province: Coclé
- District: Penonomé

Area
  - Land: 115 km^{2} (44 sq mi)

Population (2010)
  - Total: 4,100
  - Density: 35.6/km^{2} (92/sq mi)
- Population density calculated based on land area.
- Time zone: UTC−5 (EST)

Coclé is a corregimiento in Penonomé District, Coclé Province, Panama with a population of 4,100 as of 2010. Its population as of 1990 was 2,903; its population as of 2000 was 3,637.
