= El Potrero, Coclé =

Coordinates: 8.5167°N 80.5333°W

El Potrero
- Corregimiento
- Location within Panama
- Country: Panama
- Province: Coclé
- District: La Pintada

Area
  - Land: 73.9 km^{2} (28.5 sq mi)

Population (2010)
  - Total: 3,165
  - Density: 42.8/km^{2} (111/sq mi)
- Population density calculated based on land area.
- Time zone: UTC−5 (EST)

El Potrero is a corregimiento in La Pintada District, Coclé Province, Panama. It has a land area of 73.9 square kilometres (28.5 sq mi) and had a population of 3,165 as of 2010, giving it a population density of 42.8 inhabitants per square kilometre (111/sq mi). Its population as of 1990 was 2,672; its population as of 2000 was 2,815.
