= Olá District =

Olá
- District

- Location of the district capital in Panama
- Coordinates: 8°25′12″N 80°38′24″W
- Country: Panama
- Province: Coclé
- Capital: Olá

Area
  - Total: 381 km^{2} (147 sq mi)

Population (2000)
  - Total: 5,671
- Time zone: UTC-5 (ETZ)

Olá is a district (distrito) of Coclé Province in Panama. The population according to the 2000 census was 5,671. The district covers a total area of 381 km^{2} (147 sq mi). The capital lies at the town of Olá.

== Administrative divisions ==
Olá District is divided administratively into the following corregimientos:

- Olá (capital)
- El Copé
- El Palmar
- El Picacho
- La Pava
