= Aguadulce Airport =

- IATA: none; ICAO: none

Summary
- Airport type: Public
- Serves: Aguadulce, Panama
- Elevation AMSL: 104 ft / 32 m
- Coordinates: 8°15′05″N 80°33′55″W

Map
- Location in Panama

Runways
Direction	Length		Surface
Direction	m	ft	Surface
03/21	1,280	4,199	Dirt
- Sources: Google Maps FallingRain

Aguadulce Airport was an airport serving the city of Aguadulce in Coclé Province, Panama.

The runway is adjacent to the west side of the city. There is a dirt road crossing the runway midfield.

The Alonso Valderrama non-directional beacon (Ident: CHE) is located 18.6 nautical miles (34.4 km) south-southeast of the airport. The Santiago VOR-DME (Ident: STG) is located 24.3 nautical miles (45 km) west-southwest of the airport.

== See also ==
- Transport in Panama
- List of airports in Panama
