= Sitio Conte =

Archeological site in Panama

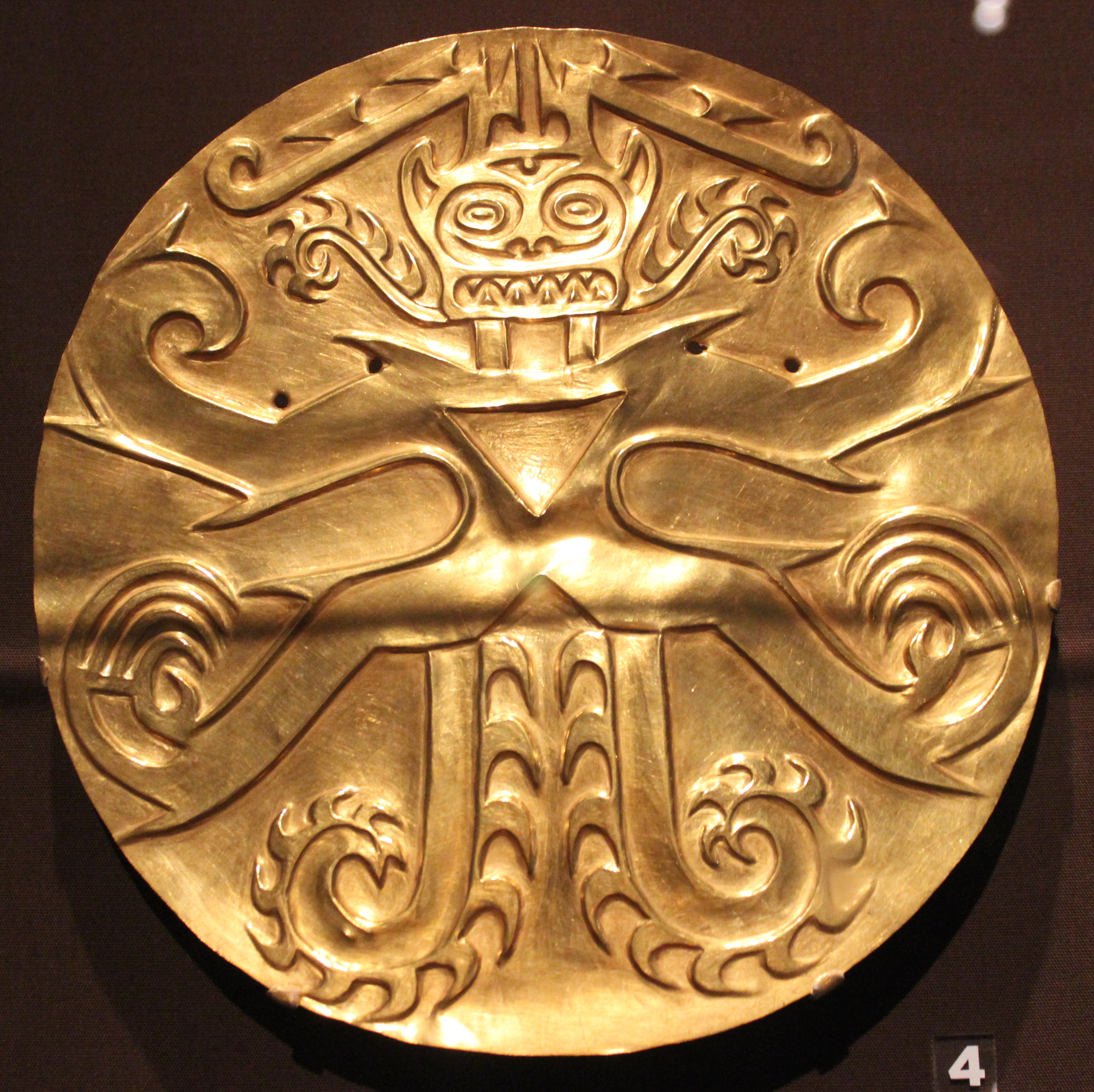
A large gold plaque or pectoral, excavated from Sitio Conte by the University of Pennsylvania Museum in 1940. A Penn Museum blog post gives an idea of how this plaque was used.

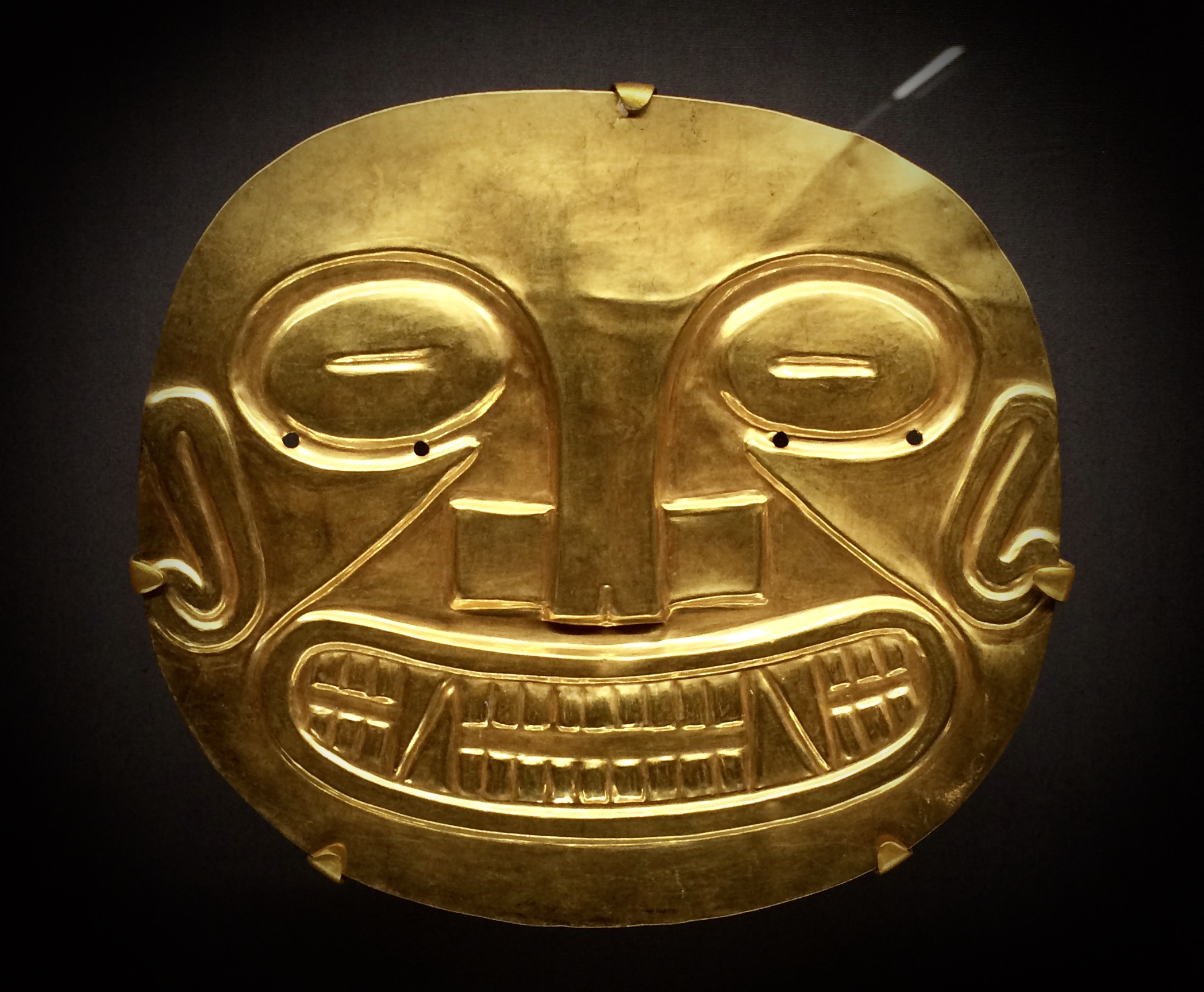
A smaller gold plaque from Sitio Conte, found in Trench 4, Grave 32, Burial B. From about 700 AD. Excavated in 1930 by the Peabody Museum, Harvard.

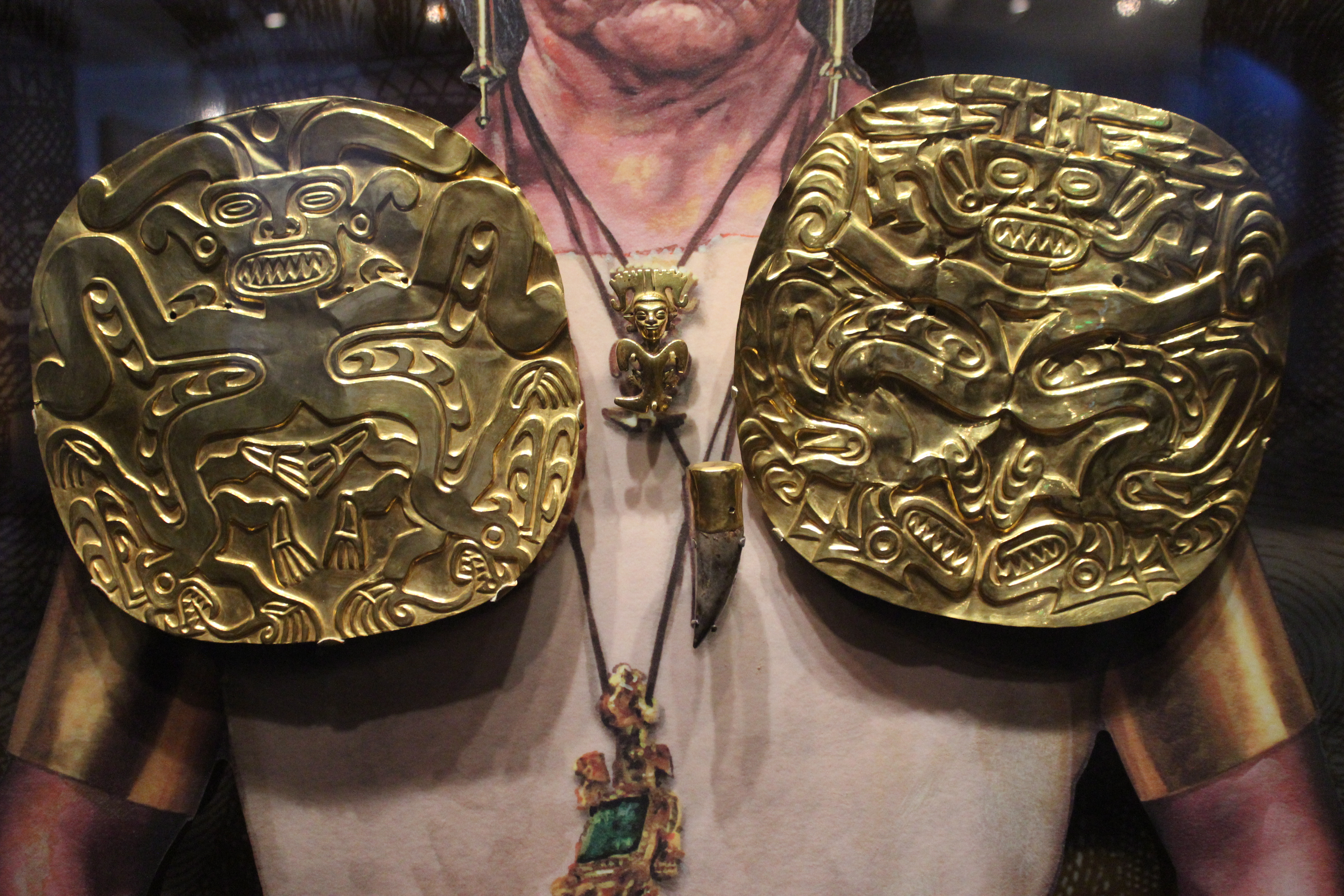
A museum exhibit shows the archaeologists' ideas of how the golden artifacts were worn. Penn Museum exhibit, 2015.

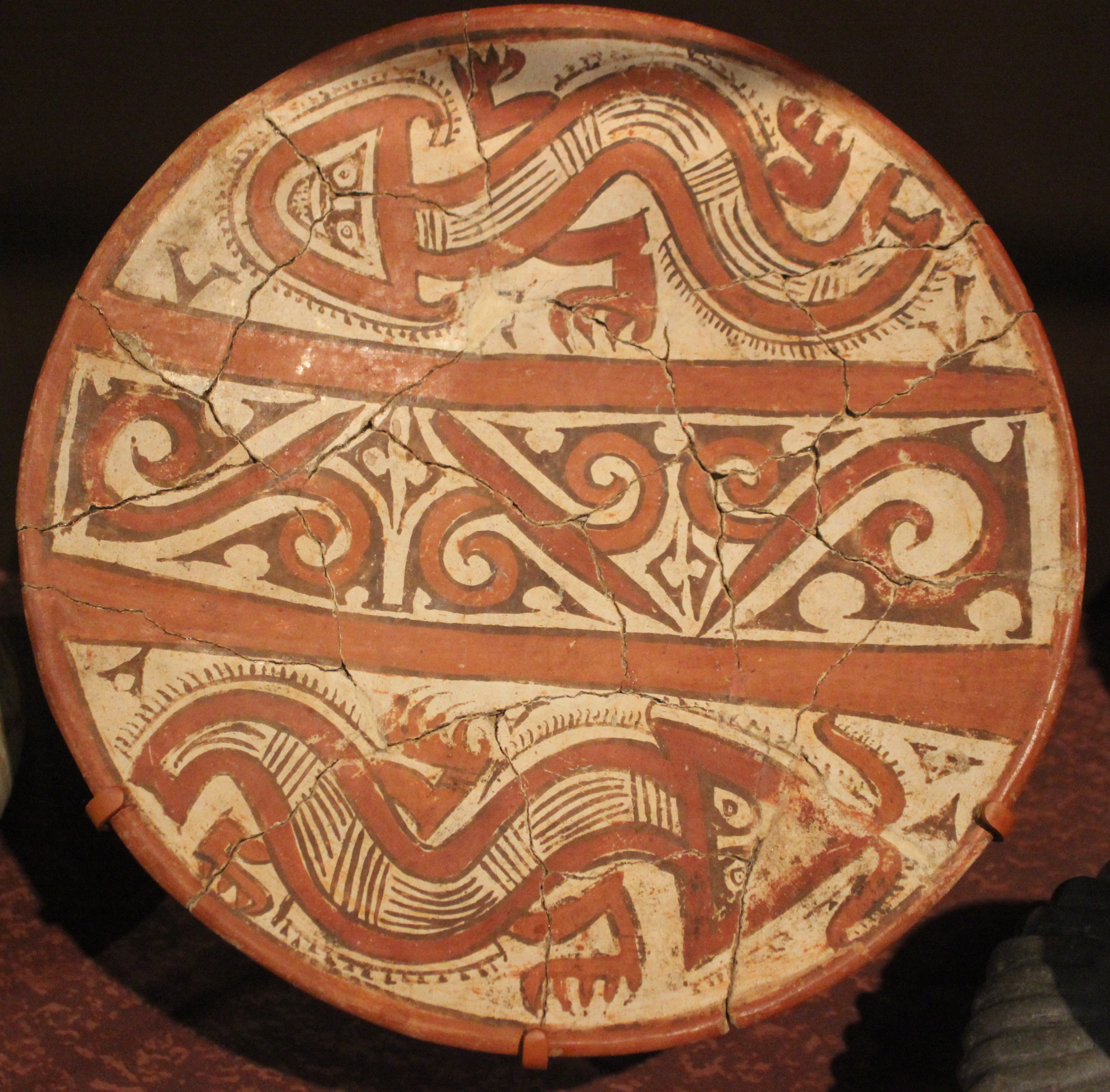
Pottery found at Sitio Conte. Penn Museum exhibit, 2015.

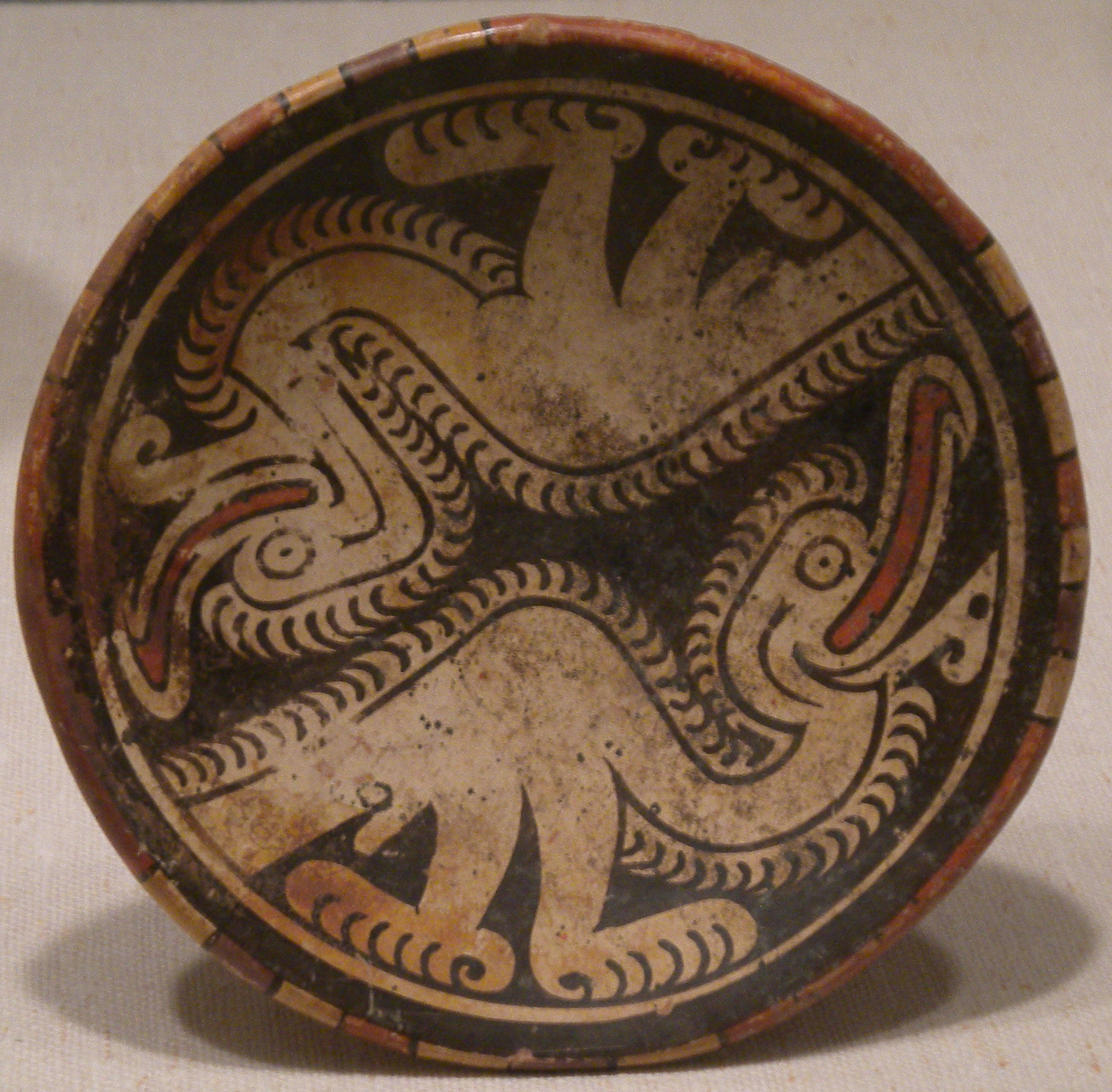
Pedestal plate (5th-8th century), recovered at the Conte site. Polychrome ceramic, 6 in high. Metropolitan Museum of Art, New York.

Sitio Conte is an archaeological site located in the Coclé province of Panama near Parita Bay. It can best be described as a necropolis and a "paradigmatic example of a ranked or chiefdom society". Based on dates from the goldwork and polychrome ceramics found at the site, its use is dated from approximately AD 450–900. While the site has remained untouched since the final excavations in 1940, its mortuary remains are considered to be a critical resource to archaeologists, as they aid in the interpretation of the social dynamics in the region between AD 500 and 1500.

== Site organization ==
The site itself is located on the eastern bank of the Rio Grande de Coclé. From its core, it spreads east, north and south along the river. Surrounding the site are grasslands and a number of small hills. To the north of Sitio Conte are the Tabasará Mountains; to the south lies Parita Bay.

The most significant features at the site are the graves themselves. Architectural features are few in number and include two rows of large, roughly shaped vertical stones that measured 2 meters in height. These were associated with smaller stones with flat tops, which archaeologist Samuel Kirkland Lothrop referred to as "altars". Also included among these features were two floors and a large pile of roughly worked stones.

== A brief history ==
Little is known about Sitio Conte and the individuals who are interred therein. A number of theories as to the function of the site have been offered, ranging from a "summer residence," to a shared burial ground. Those interred within the graves have been identified as either "chiefly families" or "chiefs and warriors slain in a single battle".

Archaeologists have a good understanding as to when the site was in use, ascertained by dates associated with the goldwork and polychrome ceramics in the graves. From these artifacts, it has been revealed that the site was used from approximately AD 450 to 900. Around AD 900, the cemetery was abandoned; however, based on household refuse, it appears that domestic occupation of the site continued.

== Archaeology at Sitio Conte ==
Towards the end of the nineteenth century, the Rio Grande de Coclé changed course and began to cut through the western edge of the site. In doing so, it washed a number of artifacts downstream, which were later collected and sold. Some objects were displayed by the Panamanian government during the opening of the Panama Canal in 1915. In 1927, the river changed course once again, sending more objects downstream.

In 1928, the Conte family excavated a pit, which revealed some of the large stone columns that Lothrop later referred to in his reports. Several of these objects found their way to the Peabody Museum of Harvard University, drawing the interest of then curator, Alfred M. Tozzer. Tozzer and Earnest A. Hooten visited the site in that same year and made arrangements for excavations by the Peabody Museum.

In 1930, when excavations began under the direction of archaeologist Henry Roberts, Sitio Conte became the "first site to receive scientific field study in Panama". Roberts led the excavations the following year as well. In 1933, the Peabody Museum returned under the direction of Samuel K. Lothrop. All three seasons of the Peabody excavations were successful, as 59 graves and 38 "caches" were discovered, as well as a large number of gold objects and polychrome ceramics.

In the late 1930s, the Conte family asked the Peabody Museum to return for further excavations, a request that was denied by director Donald Scott. Instead, it was suggested that J. Alden Mason of the University Museum of Archaeology and Anthropology (the Penn Museum) in Philadelphia continue the excavations. In 1940, Mason and his colleagues carried out another successful excavation, uncovering 41 graves, which included a large number of grave goods. This was to be the last excavation at the site.

The excavations of both the Peabody Museum and the University Museum have been criticized for the manner in which they were conducted. Most criticisms are aimed at the archaeologists' decisions to forego any stratigraphic investigations at the site. Olga Linares felt that "good stratigraphic control was sacrificed for expediency. Others have criticized their work for "both lack of control over artifact recording and unclear field notes".

The archaeologists who excavated Sitio Conte found 228 dogs buried at the site, along with many teeth that were used for decorative purposes, for example, as beads on the apron found in the burial remains of an elite woman. Katherine B. Moore of the University of Pennsylvania has analyzed these dog teeth decorations, showing that they came from a single breed and pointing to them as evidence for the entry of dogs into South America and their domestication.

== Prominent graves ==
=== Grave 1 ===
Grave 1 is considered to be one of the more prominent unearthed during the Peabody excavation. It dates to AD 400-500. Those who were interred have been interpreted to be a "chief and three of his retainers". The primary occupant, skeleton 1, was interred in a seated position and lavishly adorned with grave goods. Among these were eight effigy vessels and 112 plates or bowls, all of which were spread along the edge of the grave.

Also included were gold or tumbaga beads, pendants, greaves and chisels, a canine teeth apron, mirror backs, whale teeth and carved manatee ribs with gold overlay, seventeen hundred serpentine beads and several bundles of stingray spines. Skeleton two also had many of these same objects in association, as well as a small quantity of celts and stone blades. The remaining skeletons had similar grave goods, although fewer in number.

=== Grave 5 ===
Dating to around AD 700/800-900, Grave 5 contained fifteen skeletons and a number of grave goods. Interred in the seated position, the primary skeleton (15) was originally housed in a "makeshift hut," that had long since decomposed. His grave goods included a carved whale tooth pendant, stone mirror backs, gold or tumbaga greaves, cuffs, plaques and a helmet. On the floor were stone slabs, tortoise shells and various ceramics.

Of the other fourteen skeletons that were included in the grave, eight were located along the south and west sides of the grave and the other six were found on the northern edge. Lothrop felt that the northern group likely belonged to an earlier burial. Some of their grave goods included bone, gold and stone pendants.

=== Grave 26 ===
One of the richest graves of the Peabody excavations, Grave 26 contained 22 skeletons and dates to the same period as Grave 5. The primary occupant, skeleton 12, was interred in a seated position and was once enclosed in a makeshift hut. Forming the floor of the grave were a number of ceramics, a stone slab and the remainder of the grave's occupants.

Some of the grave goods that are associated with the primary interment include gold or tumbaga plaques, cuffs, greaves, beads, carved whale teeth and manatee ribs, stingray spines and an emerald. Of the 126 ceramic pieces found in Grave 26, a majority of them lined the walls of the grave. These included thirty-six effigy vessels and ninety polychrome plates. The other occupants had a few grave goods, including several gold ear rods, which were associated with Skeleton 8.

=== Grave 74 ===
Excavated during the 1940 expedition led by J. Alden Mason, Grave 74 dates to AD 700/800-900 and is one of richest known graves at Sitio Conte. The primary occupants, skeletons 15 and 16, were found lying on top of one another in the center of the middle layer. Also known as Burial 11, this grave contained over 7500 mortuary furnishings, as well as twenty-three interments that were placed on three levels.

Upper level

As Mason and his team were digging, they uncovered eight skeletons, all of which were lying face down and parallel to one another. Six of these skeletons were identified as old or mature males, while the other two were unsexed. Among their grave goods were ceramics, stone projectile points, celts, and a winged agate pendant. Skeleton 4 had a cache of stone points at its feet, a cache of gold beads and five repoussé gold plaques, which lay atop the individual. Intact vessels and ceramic sherds lined the north and south ends of the burial, which continued down into the second level.

Middle level

Proceeding further into the excavation, the team began to reveal a 2nd level of burials. This level contained twelve skeletons that were accompanied by thousands of grave goods. The primary occupants of the grave, skeletons 15 and 16, were located in the center of this level with five skeletons on the pair's east side, three on the west and single skeletons on the north and south ends.

Associated with the central individuals were a large number of grave goods, including a large number of repoussé and plain gold plaques, ear rods, bells, greaves and beads. There were also a number of stone projectile points and celts. The most famous of the goods associated with these individuals is the cast gold composite effigy animal pendant with an emerald embedded in its back. This was found lying bottom up atop the gold plaques that covered the two central individuals.

Numerous items were placed with the other occupants of this grave: gold triangles, a pair of whale teeth, a carved figure covered with gold, canine teeth, several green projectile points and a stone celt.

It was on this level that the "ceramic wall" reached both its thickest point, 30 centimeters, and its end. The excavators began to become overwhelmed by the large quantity of ceramics and removed many of the vessels without recording any information. Mason (n.d.: 64) noted that the field team got "gold fever" and "were anxious to get [the] vessels removed from above [the] gold objects, so began removing vessels before making list".

Lower level

After clearing the second level, the team reached the lowest point of the grave. As they removed the layer of ceramic sherds and surrounding dirt, they uncovered three skeletons. The individual in the center, skeleton 21, lay on its side, while the other two lay face down. Two of the skeletons, 21 and 22, had a few objects associated with them, including a gold bat effigy pendant, ear rods, some stone celts, and a large embossed gold plaque.

== The art of Sitio Conte ==
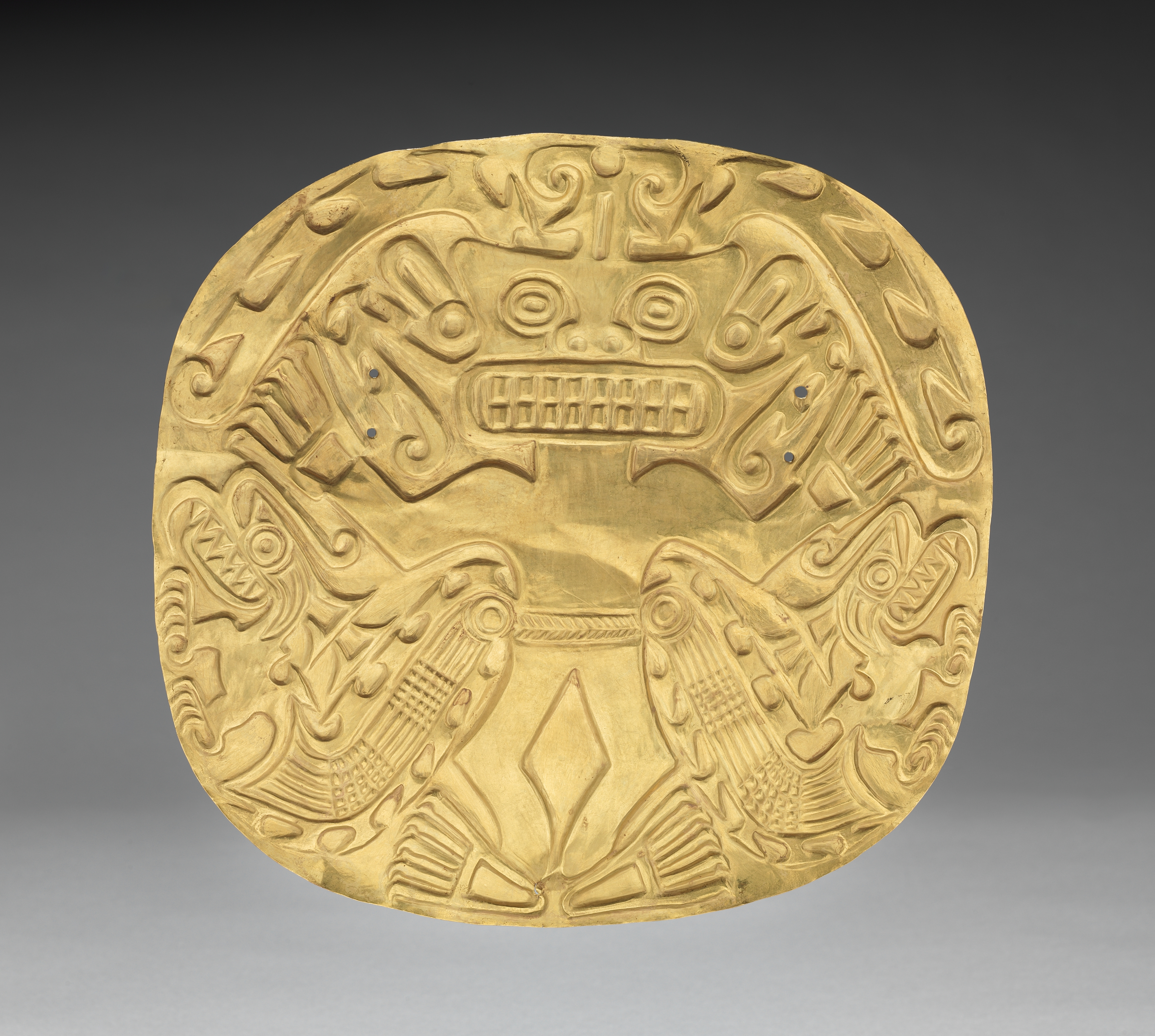
A golden chest plaque embossed with a creature that has reptile claws and the head crest of an iguana

The iconography of the gold and ceramic pieces at Sitio Conte reflects a highly refined artistry. While some figures are abstract representations of animals, others appear to be therianthropic in nature. These figures mostly appear in two basic designs, single or paired. There are exceptions to this as some ceramics contain multiple images as well.

The iconography of the gold pieces varies from animals such as bats, deer, sharks, crocodiles, and saurians to human and therianthropic figures. Many of these subjects are represented in the iconography of the Coclé style ceramics that appear within the burials. They also include images of snakes, birds, turtles, crabs, insects, frogs, stingrays, armadillos and monkeys. It has been suggested that the inclusion of these gold and ceramic pieces may represent the rank of the individuals with whom they are associated.

== Sitio Conte today ==
Sitio Conte has remained untouched by professional archaeologists since Mason's only season in 1940. The land where the site is located belongs to the Conte family of Coclé, and is currently in use as agricultural fields.

== Bibliography ==
- Benson, Elizabeth P. (1992) "Motifs, Meanings, and Myths: The Iconography of Sitio Conte Gold Plaques" in River of Gold – Precolumbian Treasures from Sitio Conte. Eds: Hearne, Pamela and Robert J. Sharer Philadelphia: University Museum, University of Pennsylvania.
- Bray, Warwick (1992) "Sitio Conte Metalwork in its Pan-American Context" in River of Gold – Precolumbian Treasures from Sitio Conte. Eds: Hearne, Pamela and Robert J. Sharer Philadelphia: University Museum, University of Pennsylvania.
- Briggs, Peter S. (1989) Art, Death, and Social Order: The Mortuary Arts of Pre-Conquest Central Panama. BAR international series, 550. Oxford, England: B.A.R.
- Cooke, Richard G. (1976) Panama: Region Central. Vinculos, 2:122–140.
- Hearne, Pamela (1992) "The Story of the River of Gold" in River of Gold—Precolumbian Treasures from Sitio Conte. Eds: Hearne, Pamela and Robert J. Sharer Philadelphia: University Museum, University of Pennsylvania.
- Linares, Olga F. (1977) "Ecology and the arts in ancient Panama: On the development of social rank and symbolism in the central provinces." in Studies in pre-Columbian art and archaeology, no. 17. Washington: Dumbarton Oaks, Trustees for Harvard University.
- Lothrop, Samuel K. (1937) Coclé, an archaeological study of central Panama, vol. 1. Cambridge: Published by the Museum.
- Stirling, M. W. (1949) The Importance of Sitio Conte. American Anthropologist, 45(3), pp. 514–517.
