= El Copé =

- Corregimiento
- Location within Panama
- Coordinates: 8°37′12″N 80°36′0″W
- Country: Panama
- Province: Coclé
- District: Olá

Area
  - Land: 76.7 km^{2} (29.6 sq mi)

Population (2010)
  - Total: 1,425
  - Density: 18.6/km^{2} (48/sq mi)
- Population density calculated based on land area.
- Time zone: UTC−5 (EST)

El Copé is a corregimiento (subdistrict) in Olá District, Coclé Province, Panama. It has a land area of 76.7 square kilometres (29.6 sq mi) and had a population of 1,425 as of 2010, giving it a population density of 18.6 inhabitants per square kilometre (48/sq mi). Its population as of 1990 was 1,081; its population as of 2000 was 1,263.

== See also ==
- El Copé National Park
