= Cañaveral, Coclé =

Coordinates: 8.5167°N 80.4333°W

Cañaveral
- Corregimiento
- Location within Panama
- Country: Panama
- Province: Coclé
- District: Penonomé

Area
  - Land: 63.8 km^{2} (24.6 sq mi)

Population (2010)
  - Total: 7,517
  - Density: 117.8/km^{2} (305/sq mi)
- Population density calculated based on land area.
- Time zone: UTC−5 (EST)

Cañaveral is a corregimiento in Penonomé District, Coclé Province, Panama with a population of 7,517 as of 2010. Its population as of 1990 was 4,953; its population as of 2000 was 6,367.
