= Pocrí, Coclé =

Pocrí
- Corregimiento
- Location within Panama
- Coordinates: 8°16′12″N 80°33′0″W
- Country: Panama
- Province: Coclé
- District: Aguadulce

Area
  - Land: 22.5 km^{2} (8.7 sq mi)

Population (2010)
  - Total: 12,881
  - Density: 572.5/km^{2} (1,483/sq mi)
- Population density calculated based on land area.
- Time zone: UTC−5 (EST)

Pocrí is a corregimiento in Aguadulce District, Coclé Province, Panama. It has a land area of 22.5 square kilometres (8.7 sq mi) and had a population of 12,881 as of 2010, giving it a population density of 572.5 inhabitants per square kilometre (1,483/sq mi). Its population as of 1990 was 8,203; its population as of 2000 was 11,124.
