= Río Indio, Coclé =

Coordinates: 8.9689°N 80.1772°W

Río Indio
- Corregimiento
- Location within Panama
- Country: Panama
- Province: Coclé
- District: Penonomé

Area
  - Land: 297.5 km^{2} (114.9 sq mi)

Population (2010)
  - Total: 5,240
  - Density: 17.6/km^{2} (46/sq mi)
- Population density calculated based on land area.
- Time zone: UTC−5 (EST)

Río Indio is a corregimiento in Penonomé District, Coclé Province, Panama with a population of 5,240 as of 2010. Its population as of 1990 was 4,513; its population as of 2000 was 4,590.
