= Los Caños =

Los Caños may refer to:

- Los Caños de Meca, a village in the province of Cádiz, Spain
- Los Caños (band), musical group
- Mariana Grajales Airport, an airport in Guantánamo, Cuba originally known as Los Caños
