= El Roble, Coclé =

El Roble
- Corregimiento
- Location within Panama
- Coordinates: 8°10′12″N 80°39′0″W
- Country: Panama
- Province: Coclé
- District: Aguadulce

Area
  - Land: 218.8 km^{2} (84.5 sq mi)

Population (2010)
  - Total: 8,369
  - Density: 38.2/km^{2} (99/sq mi)
- Population density calculated based on land area.
- Time zone: UTC−5 (EST)

El Roble is a corregimiento in Aguadulce District, Coclé Province, Panama. It has a land area of 218.8 square kilometres (84.5 sq mi) and had a population of 8,369 as of 2010, giving it a population density of 38.2 inhabitants per square kilometre (99/sq mi). Its population as of 1990 was 7,097; its population as of 2000 was 7,997.
