= Aguadulce District =

Aguadulce
- District

- Location of the district capital in Panama
- Coordinates: 8°14′24″N 80°32′24″W
- Country: Panama
- Province: Coclé
- Capital: Aguadulce

Area
  - Total: 466 km^{2} (180 sq mi)

Population (2000)
  - Total: 39,290
- Time zone: UTC-5 (ETZ)

Aguadulce (Spanish pronunciation: [aɣwaˈðulse]) is a district (distrito) of Coclé Province in Panama. The population according to the 2000 census was 39,290. The district covers a total area of 466 km^{2} (180 sq mi). The capital lies at the city of Aguadulce.

== Administrative divisions ==
Aguadulce District is divided administratively into the following corregimientos:

- San Juan Bautista de Aguadulce (capital)
- El Cristo
- El Roble
- Pocrí
- Barrios Unidos
