= Cañaveral, Spain =

Municipality in Extremadura, Spain

Cañaveral
- Municipality
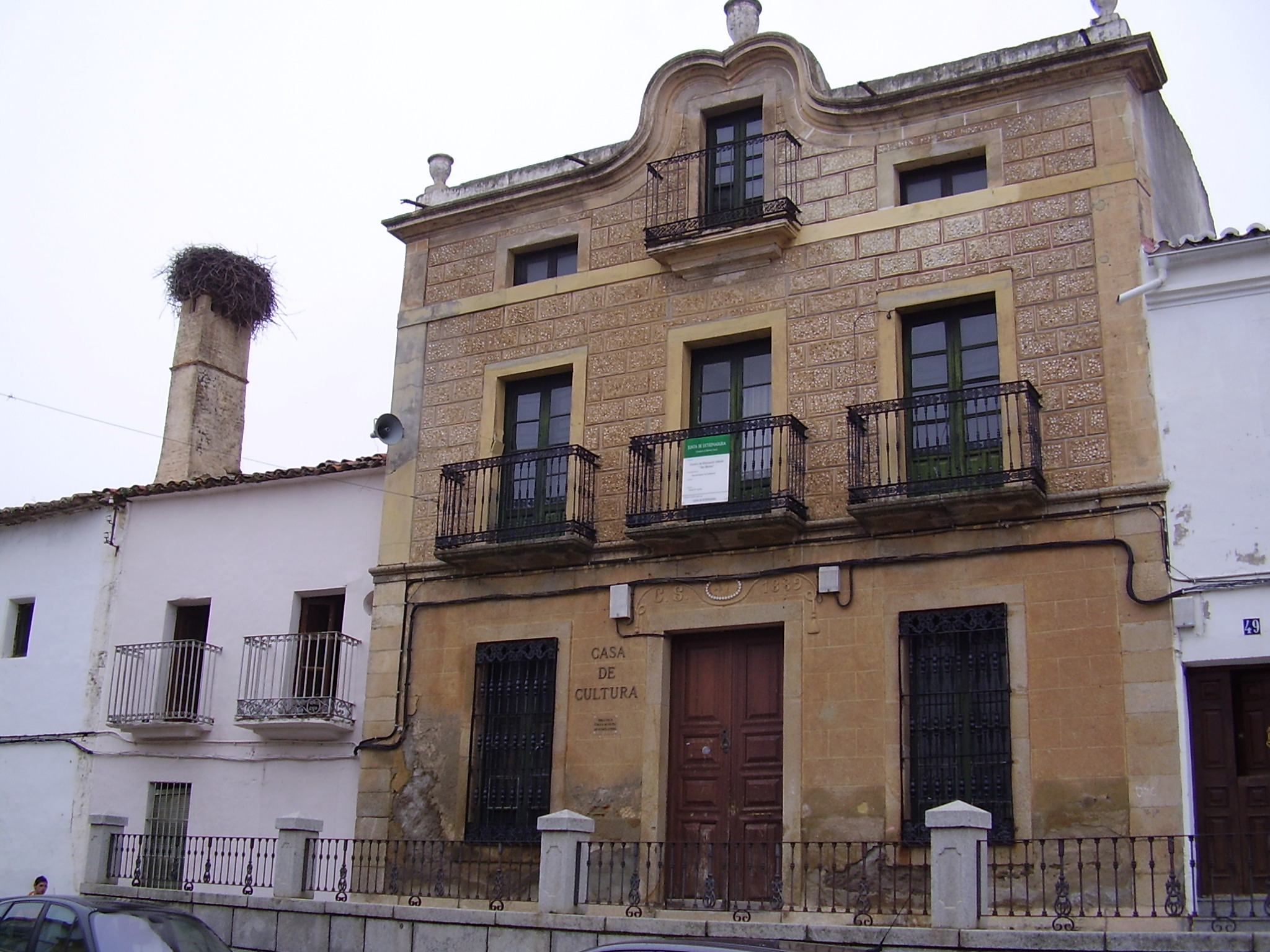
- Cañaveral cultural center

- Coat of arms

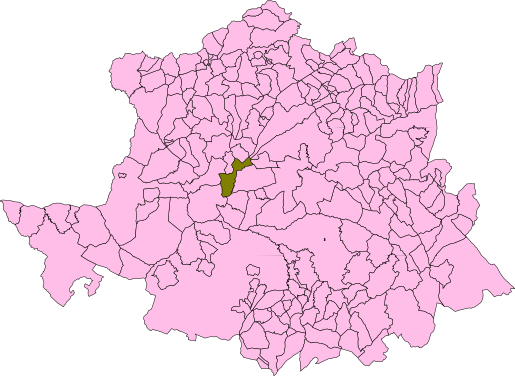
- Map of Cañaveral
- Coordinates: 39°47′N 6°24′W
- Country: Spain
- Autonomous community: Extremadura
- Province: Cáceres

Area
  - Total: 86.48 km^{2} (33.39 sq mi)

Population (2011)
  - Total: 1,248
  - Density: 14.43/km^{2} (37.38/sq mi)

Cañaveral is a municipality in the province of Cáceres, an autonomous community of Extremadura, Spain. The municipality covers an area of 86.48 square kilometres (33.39 sq mi) and as of 2011 had a population of 1248 people.

== See also ==
- List of municipalities in Cáceres
