= Joselyn Cano =

American model (1990–2020)

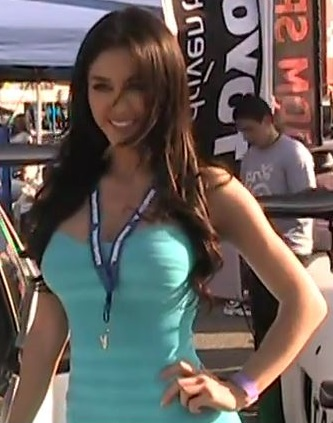
- Born: March 14, 1990; Anaheim, California, U.S.
- Died: December 7, 2020 (aged 30)
- Other names: Josey Cano; "The Mexican Kim Kardashian"
- Occupations: Model; fashion designer; Internet personality
- Years active: 2008–2020
- Children: 2

Joselyn Cano (March 14, 1990 – December 7, 2020) was an American model, fashion designer and Internet personality.

== Career ==
Born in Anaheim, California, and raised in Lake Elsinore, Cano first started modelling at the age of 17 for local magazines.

In 2014, she gained notoriety by being on the cover of the Lowrider magazine at age 14. Cano was also featured in World Star Hip Hop's Valentine's Day Special video. During the summer of that year she portrayed Gerardo Ortiz's girlfriend in the Music Video for his single Y me besa.

In 2015, she was featured in the Hot Bike motorcycle magazine.

In 2016, Cano was featured on the Sports Illustrated website as one of the Lovely Ladies of the day.

In 2018, Cano launched her own line of Swimwear. In recent years, Cano had gained notable popularity through the use of social media.

Due to her popularity on social media some Hispanic media have nicknamed Cano "The Mexican Kim Kardashian".

Her Instagram profile has over 13 million followers. She had two children.

== Death ==
Cano died December 7, 2020. Model Lira Mercer announced her death, claiming that Cano died due to cosmetic surgery, however the official cause of death has not yet been confirmed. Her funeral was held at the Grimes-Akes Family Funeral Homes in Corona, California.
