= Las Huacas, Coclé =

Coordinates: 8.4667°N 80.7500°W

Las Huacas
- Corregimiento
- Location within Panama
- Country: Panama
- Province: Coclé
- District: Natá

Area
  - Land: 90.2 km^{2} (34.8 sq mi)

Population (2010)
  - Total: 1,585
  - Density: 17.6/km^{2} (46/sq mi)
- Population density calculated based on land area.
- Time zone: UTC−5 (EST)

Las Huacas is a corregimiento in Natá District, Coclé Province, Panama. It has a land area of 90.2 square kilometres (34.8 sq mi) and had a population of 1,585 as of 2010, giving it a population density of 17.6 inhabitants per square kilometre (46/sq mi). Its population as of 1990 was 1,364; its population as of 2000 was 1,417.
