= Natá District =

Natá
- District

- Location of the district capital in Panama
- Coordinates: 8°19′48″N 80°31′12″W
- Country: Panama
- Province: Coclé
- Capital: Natá

Area
  - Total: 608 km^{2} (235 sq mi)

Population (2000)
  - Total: 17,811
- Time zone: UTC-5 (ETZ)

Natá is a district (distrito) of Coclé Province in Panama. The population according to the 2000 census was 17,811. The district covers a total area of 608 km^{2}. The capital lies at the city of Natá.

== Administrative divisions ==
Natá District is divided administratively into the following corregimientos:

- Natá de los Caballeros (capital)
- Capellanía
- El Caño
- Guzmán
- Las Huacas
- Toza
