= Samuel Kirkland Lothrop =

American anthropologist and archaeologist (1892–1965)

Samuel Kirkland Lothrop (July 6, 1892 – January 10, 1965) was an American archaeologist and anthropologist who specialized in Central and South American Studies. His two-volume 1926 work Pottery of Costa Rica and Nicaragua is regarded as a pioneering study. Lothrop was a longtime research associate of Harvard's Peabody Museum of Archaeology and Ethnology and made many contributions based on fieldwork, laboratory analysis, and evaluations of private and public collections that focused on Central and South America. He is known for archaeological excavations in Argentina and Chile as well as investigations of the archaeological contexts for the stone spheres of Costa Rica. Lothrop is also known for his research on goldwork and other artifacts from Costa Rica, the Veraguas Province of Panama, and the Sacred Cenote at Chichen Itza, Mexico.

== Early life ==
Lothrop was a descendant of his namesake, prominent Unitarian minister Samuel Kirkland Lothrop. He was born in Milton, Massachusetts, on July 6, 1892, to William and Alice Lothrop. His childhood was split between Massachusetts and Puerto Rico. Lothrop's interest in Latin America may have been sparked in his childhood as a result of his having spent time in Puerto Rico, where his father was a banker with interests in the sugarcane industry.

=== Education ===
Lothrop began his education at Groton School, a private boarding school in Massachusetts. He entered Harvard University in 1911, where he completed his undergraduate studies in 1915. In 1914, he married Rachel Warren, daughter of Fiske and Gretchen Osgood Warren. After completing his undergraduate studies he began graduate school at Harvard, focusing on anthropology and archaeology. He traveled extensively throughout Central America as a research associate of the Peabody Museum, excavating various areas and studying collections. His travels and excavations were interrupted by the eruption of World War I, where he served in military intelligence. After the war, he returned to his graduate work, eventually earning his Ph.D. with a doctoral dissertation, a version of which was published in 1926 as Pottery of Costa Rica and Nicaragua.

== Military career ==
Lothrop was engaged in espionage for the U.S. prior to and during World War I and for the Office of Strategic Services prior to and during World War II. Using anthropologists for gathering intelligence was a common practice of the time. Given their ability to observe cultural practices as well as those useful to strategies of war, not to mention the fact that they could use their careers as a cover for their intelligence gathering, anthropologists are ideal choices for spies. During World War II, he was not excavating once again, because of the time spent working for the military. His position in the military did however give him the opportunity to travel while compositing notes on various sites.

== Career ==
After completing his doctorate studies, Lothrop worked field excavations in the Yucatan and Guatemala under the employment of the Carnegie Institution's Historical Division. His research resulted in the 1924 publishing of the monograph of his mapping of the Mayan Ruin of Tulum. From 1924 until the end of the stock market crash in 1929, Lothrop was employed by the Museum of the American Indian, Heye Foundation. It was during 1929 also that he married his second wife, Eleanor Bachman of Philadelphia. His work while he was on staff at the museum was also focused on Latin America and it was during this time that he established a relationship with Fernando Marquez Miranda. It was through this relationship that Lothrop was one of the few foreigners allowed to conduct excavations in Argentine Territory.

=== Notable excavations ===
==== Sitio Conte ====
In the 1930s, after the closing of the museum, Lothrop returned to the Peabody Museum staff as field director of the Sitio Conte in Central Panama. Before he returned, the Peabody museum had purchased a collection of jewelry excavated from a burial ground. After obtaining permission from the government and the landowner, the museum excavated the burial grounds during the dry seasons from 1930 to 1933.

=== Stone spheres of Costa Rica ===
In 1943, through a publication of American Antiquity by Doris Stone, Lothrop first encountered the mysterious stone spheres. In 1948, he and his wife met up with Doris Stone and she collaborated with them, setting them up with a place to excavate. The stone spheres are a topic of discussion, concerning how these objects were formed and by whom. Lothrop's research resulted in the theory that the balls were placed in alignments significant astronomically. During his research Lothrop recorded 186 balls as reported in his 1963 publication, Archaeology of the Diquís Delta. Lothrop determined that the spheres were formed over many centuries, suggesting a cultural practice and continuity over an extended period of time. His conclusions were based on analyzing the pottery types.

== Notable accomplishments ==
Lothrop continued to be a contributor to the field up until his death in 1965. Late in life he wrote a book titled The Treasures of Ancient America: The Arts of the Pre-Columbian Civilizations from Mexico to Peru (1964), Editions d'Art Albert Skira, Geneva, 230 pp. As a result of his numerous publications and contributions to the field he was the recipient of numerous honors, medals, and awards. Lothrop was cited by the American Society for American Archaeology in 1960. He also received the Loubat Prize awarded by Columbia University. The Alfred Kidder Vincent Medal given by the Society of American Archaeology. The Royal Anthropological Institute awarded Lothrop the Huxley Memorial Medal.
