= La Pintada, Panama =

La Pintada
- Corregimiento and town
- Location within Panama
- Coordinates: 8.60122°N 80.448933°W
- Country: Panama
- Province: Coclé
- District: La Pintada

Area
  - Land: 84.6 km^{2} (32.7 sq mi)

Population (2010)
  - Total: 3,882
  - Density: 45.9/km^{2} (119/sq mi)
- Population density calculated based on land area.
- Time zone: UTC−5 (EST)

La Pintada is a corregimiento and town in La Pintada District, Coclé Province, Panama. It is the seat of La Pintada District. It has a land area of 84.6 square kilometres (32.7 sq mi) and had a population of 3,882 as of 2010, giving it a population density of 45.9 inhabitants per square kilometre (119/sq mi). Its population as of 1990 was 3,515; its population as of 2000 was 3,733.

The town is located in the hills 13 km (8.1 mi) northwest of Penonomé. The Coclé del Sur River runs along the edge of the town. Two kilometers from the town are located a variety of pre-Columbian petroglyphs.

The factory for the cigar brand Cigarros Joyas de Panamá is located in the town. There is also a small artisans' market that sells Panama hats and various local crafts.
