= El Caño =

Town and corregimiento in Coclé, Panama

- Town and corregimiento
- Location within Panama
- Coordinates: 8°24′0″N 80°31′12″W
- Country: Panama
- Province: Coclé
- District: Natá

Area
  - Land: 86 km^{2} (33 sq mi)

Population (2010)
  - Total: 3,351
  - Density: 38.9/km^{2} (101/sq mi)
- Population density calculated based on land area.
- Time zone: UTC−5 (EST)

El Caño is a town and corregimiento in Natá District, Coclé Province, Panama. It has a land area of 86 square kilometres (33 sq mi) and had a population of 3,351 as of 2010, giving it a population density of 38.9 inhabitants per square kilometre (101/sq mi). Its population as of 1990 was 2,936; its population as of 2000 was 3,276.

El Caño is named after a nearby waterfall found in a creek whose waters end in a nearby river.

== Archaeological significance ==
In 2010, at El Caño, a Pre-Columbian cemetery was discovered. It contained numerous preserved bodies and gold artifacts from a pre-Columbian culture. It is known as the El Caño Archaeological Park.
