= Order of Manuel José Hurtado =

Decoration awarded by the Panamanian government

Order of Manuel José Hurtado Orden Manuel José Hurtado

Awarded by the Ministry of Education Panama
- Awarded for: Work of cultural and educational value
- Status: Currently constituted
- Ribbon bar of the order

The Order of Manuel José Hurtado (Spanish: Orden Manuel José Hurtado) is the highest order for educators of the Republic of Panama and was established by Decree No. 412 of November 27, 1959. It is named after Manuel José Hurtado, a former civil engineer and educator, who is considered to be the founder of the educational system in Panama. Annually on December 1, the Order is awarded to teachers, schools, civic groups, religious associations, parents, business, institutions or organizations who have made work of cultural and educational value. There is also the "National Council of the Order of Manuel José Hurtado", whose members organize the selection of the winners who have distinguished themselves in the field of education.

== Classes ==
The Order of Manuel José Hurtado is awarded in only one classes, i.e. that of Member, who wears the medal on a ribbon on the left side of the chest.

== Insignia ==
The badge of the Order is a silver round medal (diameter 70 mm) with a central disk showing in gold the portrait of Don Manuel José Hurtado, surrounded by the inscription in gold "Manuel José Hurtado, Padre de la Educación Panameña" (English: Manuel José Hurtado, Father of the Panamese Education). The obverse of the badge shows the year of founding of the order, i.e. "1959", and the year of issuing.

The ribbon of the Order is purple (diameter 40 mm) with a small yellow stripe in the middle (diameter 5 mm).
