= Coclé Province =

Province of Panama

Coclé Province Provincia de Coclé
- Province
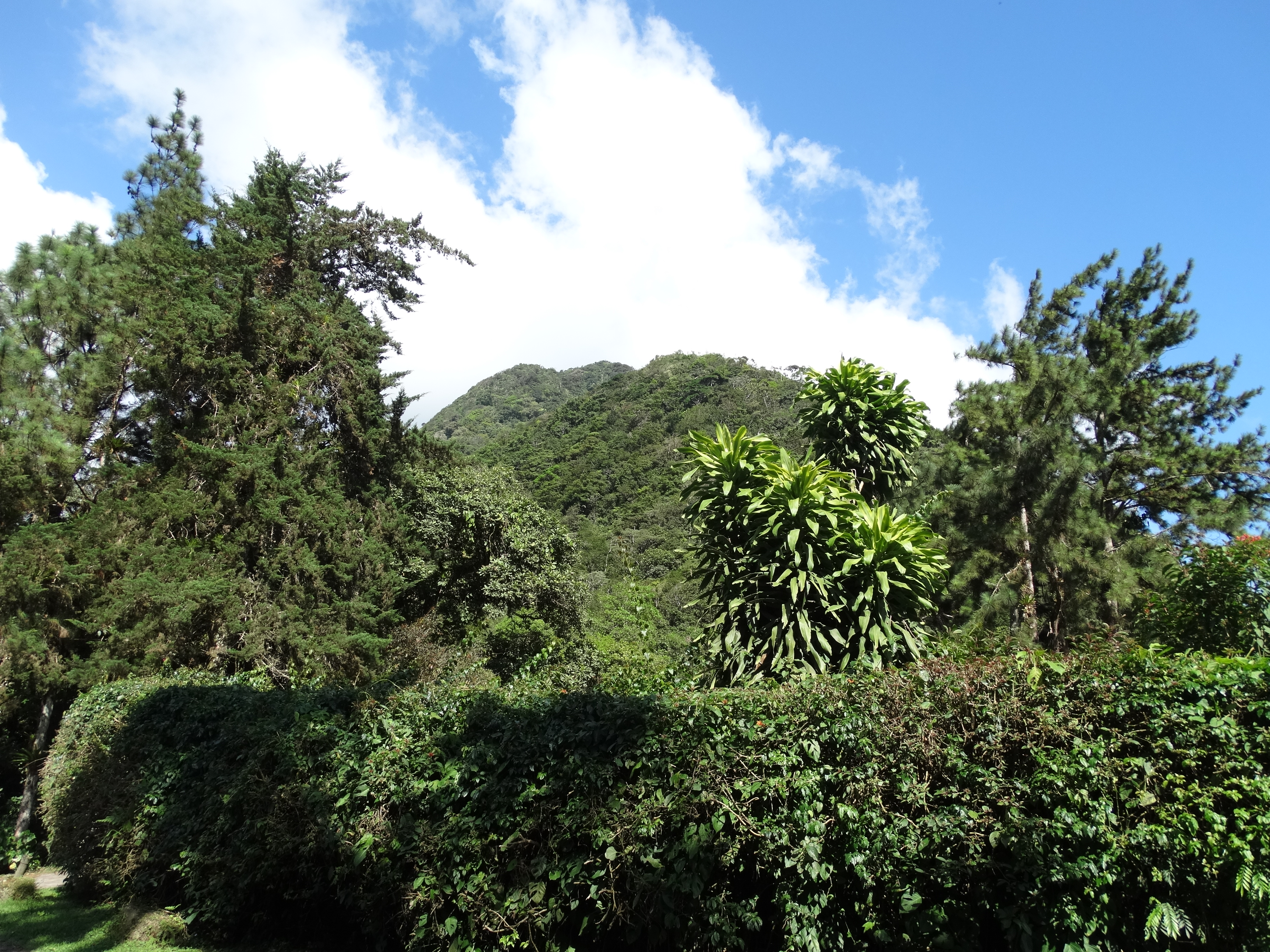

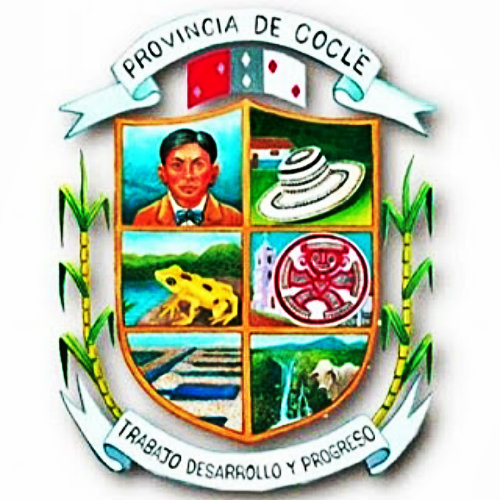
- Flag Seal
- Motto: "Trabajo, desarrollo y progreso" (Spanish) "Work, development and progress"
- Location of Coclé in Panama
- Coordinates (Seat of Government): 8°30′N 80°30′W
- Country: Panama
- Founded: 1985
- Capital: Penonomé

Area
  - Total: 4,946.6 km^{2} (1,909.9 sq mi)

Population (2023 census)
  - Total: 268,264
  - Density: 54.232/km^{2} (140.46/sq mi)

GDP (PPP, constant 2015 values)
  - Year: 2023
  - Total: $5.2 billion
  - Per capita: $20,500
- Time zone: UTC-5 (Eastern Time)
- ISO 3166 code: PA-2
- HDI (2019): 0.787 high

Coclé (Spanish pronunciation: [koˈkle]) is a province of central Panama on the nation's southern coast. The administrative capital is the city of Penonomé. This province was created by the Act of September 12, 1855 with the title of Department of Coclé during the presidency of Dr. Justo de Arosemena. It became a province, Decretory Number 190, on October 20, 1985. Coclé is primarily an agricultural area, with sugar and tomatoes as major crops. The province has a number of well-known beaches, such as Santa Clara, Farallon and Rio Hato, and tourist activity has increased in recent years. It covers an area of 4,946.6 km^{2}, and had a population of 268,264 in 2023.

== Pre-Columbian Coclé ==
During pre-Columbian times, the area of Panama which today includes Coclé province had a number of identifiable native cultures. Archaeologists have loosely designated these cultures by pottery style. The poorly studied La Mula period ranged from 150 BC to AD 300. It was followed by the Tonosi period, from AD 300 to AD 550, and by the Cubita period, from AD 550 to AD 700. A unified Indigenous culture appears to have flourished in this area from approximately 1200 BC until the 16th century.

== Administrative divisions ==
Coclé Province is divided into 6 distritos (districts) and subdivided into 44 corregimientos.

Distrito	Area (km^{2})	Population Estimate 2010	Population Estimate 2019
Aguadulce	469	47,470	51,668
Antón	748	53,361	57,672
La Pintada	1,030	27,976	30,161
Natá	605	21,507	23,374
Olá	386	6,842	7,366
Penonomé	1,709	87,600	94,908

District	Corregimientos (Subdivisions)	Cabecera (Seat)
Aguadulce District	San Juan Bautista de Aguadulce, El Cristo, El Roble, Pocrí, Barrios Unidos	San Juan Bautista de Aguadulce
Antón District	Antón, Cabuya, El Chirú, El Retiro, El Valle, Juan Díaz, Río Hato, San Juan de Dios, Santa Rita, Caballero	Antón
La Pintada District	La Pintada, El Harino, El Potrero, Llano Grande, Piedras Gordas, Las Lomas, Llano Norte	La Pintada
Natá District	Natá de los Caballeros, Capellanía, El Caño, Guzmán, Las Huacas, Toza	Natá de los Caballeros
Olá District	Olá, El Copé, El Palmar, El Picacho, La Pava	Olá
Penonomé District	Penonomé, Cañaveral, Coclé, Chiguirí Arriba, El Coco, Pajonal, Río Grande, Río Indio, Toabré, Tulú, El Valle de San Miguel, Vista Hermosa, Los Uveros, El Silencio	Penonomé

== Research and conservation ==
Parque Nacional General de División Omar Torrijos Herrera, established around the crash site of former Panamanian leader Omar Torrijos, is located in the northeastern portion of Coclé. Parque Omar, as it is known, enjoys some legal protection as a national park.

Coclé is also home to APROVACA orchid conservation center, which conducts orchid conservation activities, including orchid reintroduction into the wild and a sponsorship program for the Panamanian national flower Peristeria elata.

Folklorist Rosita Liao Gonzales was awarded the Order of Manuel José Hurtado for her work categorizing the cultures of Coclé Province.
