= Aguadulce, Coclé =

Aguadulce
- City and corregimiento
- Location within Panama
- Coordinates: 8°14′24″N 80°32′24″W
- Country: Panama
- Province: Coclé Province
- District: Aguadulce District

Area
  - Land: 50.4 km^{2} (19.5 sq mi)

Population (2018)
  - Total: 51,668
- Time zone: UTC−5 (EST)
- Climate: Aw

Aguadulce is an agricultural city and corregimiento in the Coclé province in Panama. It is the capital of Aguadulce District and it is located on the Pan-American Highway, near but not on the coast on the Bahia de Parita. The name means "sweetwater".

It has a land area of 50.4 square kilometres (19.5 sq mi) and had a population 51,668.

== Economy ==
Aguadulce District is an Industrial Zone dedicated to process cane sugar, rice, animal feed, shrimp, and salt production via evaporation of sea water. The water is allowed to enter fields at high tide; its exit is then blocked, and evaporation caused by the sun leaves sea salt, which is then gathered and packaged, along with seafood for export to other markets abroad. Other activities are entertainment activities in casinos, agricultural activities, commerce and restaurants.

Some significant infrastructure in Aguadulce district are Aguadulce Port, Aguadulce airport, Salao Beach. It can be mentioned that there is also offices of the Ministerio de Trabajo, Organo Judicial, Juzgado Municipal Civil, along with those of both Penal and Public Ministries.

== Climate ==
Aguadulce has a tropical savanna climate (Köppen: Aw).

Climate data for Aguadulce
Month	Jan	Feb	Mar	Apr	May	Jun	Jul	Aug	Sep	Oct	Nov	Dec	Year
Mean daily maximum °C (°F)	30.6 (87.1)	31.0 (87.8)	31.6 (88.9)	32.1 (89.8)	31.3 (88.3)	30.6 (87.1)	30.6 (87.1)	30.6 (87.1)	30.4 (86.7)	29.9 (85.8)	29.6 (85.3)	30.3 (86.5)	30.7 (87.3)
Daily mean °C (°F)	27.0 (80.6)	27.3 (81.1)	27.7 (81.9)	28.2 (82.8)	27.6 (81.7)	27.1 (80.8)	27.2 (81.0)	27.0 (80.6)	26.8 (80.2)	26.5 (79.7)	26.4 (79.5)	26.9 (80.4)	27.1 (80.9)
Mean daily minimum °C (°F)	24.2 (75.6)	24.3 (75.7)	24.7 (76.5)	25.3 (77.5)	25.3 (77.5)	24.9 (76.8)	24.9 (76.8)	24.7 (76.5)	24.5 (76.1)	24.4 (75.9)	24.3 (75.7)	24.4 (75.9)	24.7 (76.4)
Average precipitation mm (inches)	7.8 (0.31)	3.9 (0.15)	8.9 (0.35)	68.3 (2.69)	229.6 (9.04)	266.7 (10.50)	267.3 (10.52)	279.9 (11.02)	293.4 (11.55)	318.4 (12.54)	330.0 (12.99)	72.7 (2.86)	2,146.9 (84.52)
Source: Weather.Directory

== Places to Visit ==
The District has plains as well as hills. At El Salao there is a beach. In the area of El Rompio there is a cove.

== Transport ==
The city's air needs are served by Aguadulce Airport.

== Notable people ==
- Augusto Aurelio Fábrega Donado (born 1940), retired Panamanian diplomat
