= 2023 Panamanian protests =

2023 protests in Panama against a 20-to-40-year mining contract

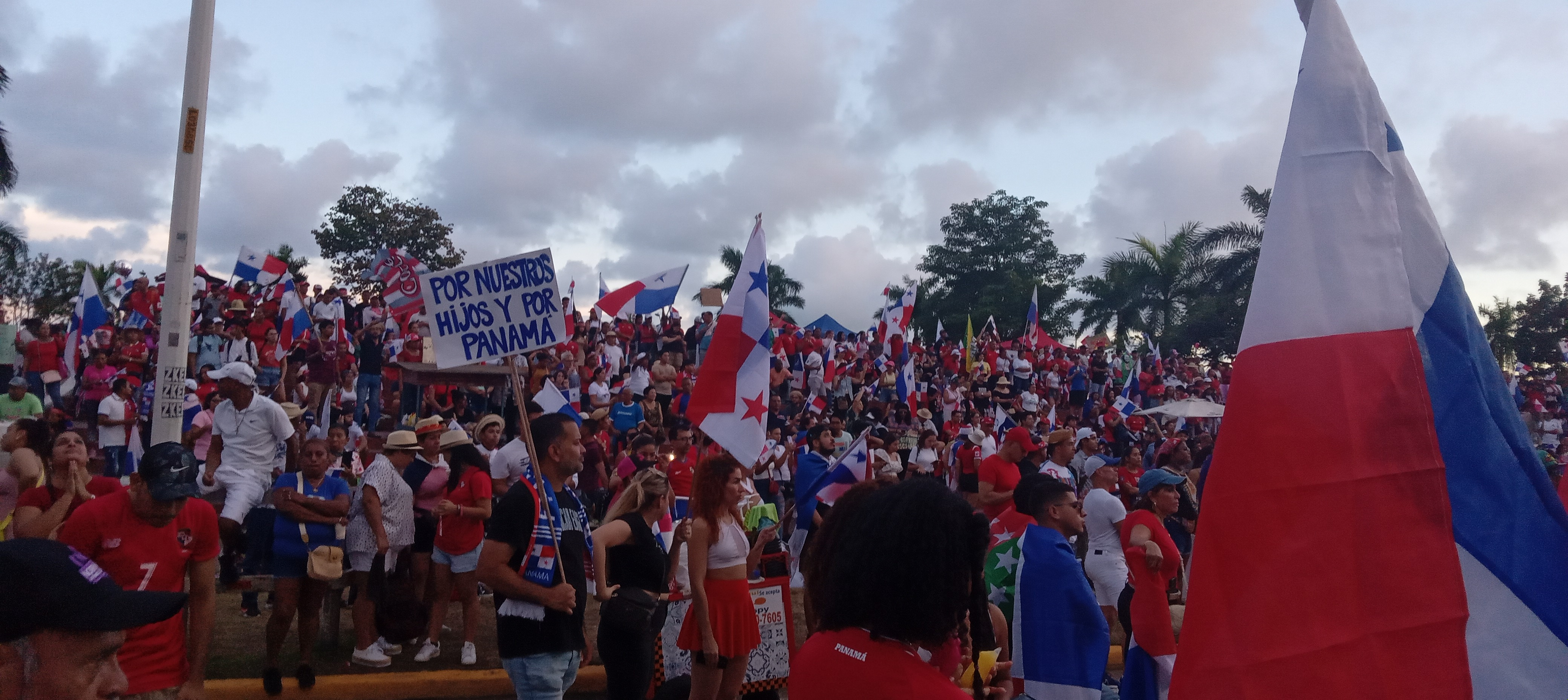
- Protesters demonstrating in the Cinta Costera of Panama City on 5 November 2023
- Date: 20 October 2023 – 2 December 2023 (1 month, 1 week and 6 days)
- Location: Panama
- Caused by: Renovation of the mining contract of Cobre Panamá, the largest open-pit copper mine in Central America, placed in a protected area of the Mesoamerican Biological Corridor
- Goals: Declaration of unconstitutionality of the contract by the Supreme Court; Suspension of new mining concessions in Panamanian territory
- Methods: Unconstitutionality lawsuits, labor strike, protests, demonstrations, civil resistance and online activism
- Result: National shortage of basic products due to road closures throughout the Pan-American Highway and other minor roads in the country; Suspension of classes for state schools, while private schools alternated between in-person and distance education; Rejected proposal of a referendum by President Laurentino Cortizo on whether to keep the mining contract; Approval of a law suspending new mining concessions in Panama by the National Assembly; Declaration of unconstitutionality by the Supreme Court of Justice on 28 November 2023, shutting down the operations of Cobre Panamá; Resignation of Federico Alfaro, minister of Commerce and Industries on 30 November 2023

Parties
Protesters: Environmental activists; Anti-mining lawyers; Teacher unions; Labor unions; SUNTRACS; Indigenous groups; Other civil groups	Government of Panama; National Assembly; Panamanian National Police; National Aeronaval Service; National Border Service; Governing political parties: Democratic Revolutionary Party; Nationalist Republican Liberal Movement; First Quantum Minerals, affiliated companies and law firms (including Morgan & Morgan)

Lead figures
Non-centralized leadership	Laurentino Cortizo, president of Panama: José Gabriel Carrizo, vice president of Panama; Federico Alfaro, minister of Commerce and Industries; Milciades Concepción, minister of Environment; Juan Manuel Pino, minister of Public Security; Jaime Vargas, president of the National Assembly First Quantum Minerals leadership and related prominent figures: Tristan Pascall, CEO of First Quantum Minerals; Arístides Royo, minister of Canal Affairs and partner of the law firm Morgan & Morgan; Rómulo Roux, 2024 presidential candidate and partner of the law firm Morgan & Morgan

Casualties
- Deaths: 4 protesters, including two fatally shot during a road closure
- Injuries: 40 policemen and numerous protesters, including a photojournalist
- Arrested: Hundreds of protesters, including some union leaders

A series of protests began in Panama on 20 October 2023 following the immediate passing of a 20-to-40-year mining contract between the government of Panama and First Quantum Minerals, the operator of Cobre Panamá, the largest open-pit copper mine in Central America, placed 20 minutes away from the western coast of Colon Province and within a protected area of the Mesoamerican Biological Corridor.

Demonstrations started in Panama City shortly after Laurentino Cortizo, the president of Panama, signed into law the mining contract approved by the National Assembly in a 43–5 vote, in less than 12 hours. The protests and road closures expanded nationwide as soon as the public learned of the undisclosed details of the negotiation and approval process of the mining contract. Demonstration hotspots included Panama City, Colón, La Chorrera, Penonomé, Santiago and David, with massive demonstrations for many days, and multiple road closures throughout the Pan-American Highway and minor roads.

President Laurentino Cortizo and his administration appeared multiple times on national media discussing protests and the economic impact of the road closures, justifying their support of the mining contract, without significant progress being made in reducing demonstrations. Eventually, the president proposed a national referendum on whether to preserve the mining contract, which was initially approved by the National Assembly even though it faced strong opposition of the public and the Electoral Tribunal (the electoral commission of the country), but was later dismissed due to numerous concerns. An initiative of repelling the mining contract with a new law was also initially approved by the National Assembly, but it was dismissed by consensus as well, as numerous lawyers suggested that the unconstitutionality would be the most appropriate way to shut down Cobre Panamá and ensuring better defense in an eventual international arbitration process.

First Quantum reported that its subsidiary MPSA made a tax and royalty payment on November 16, 2023 of $567 million for the period from December 2021 to October 2023. Following weeks of protests, the president signed Executive Decree (executive order) 23 as a mining moratorium in the country, and later the National Assembly approved a bill suspending the approval of new mining concessions in Panamanian territory on 3 November 2023, which was immediately signed into law by President Laurentino Cortizo as Law 407. Meanwhile, First Quantum Minerals was forced to reduce their operations in Cobre Panamá due to the road and sea blockades near the mine and the Punta Rincón port, their export area, by fishermen of the Donoso District. This caused the mine to not receive coal for its power plant which caused the mine to reduce operations on November 14 and later stop operations on November 23. First Quantum's stock fell by 50%.

On 28 November 2023, the Supreme Court of Justice unanimously ruled the mining contract as unconstitutional, indicating that it infringed numerous articles of the Constitution. The Supreme Court ruling was widely supported by the people, and celebrations erupted around the country. On the same day, President Cortizo told the public that his administration will ensure the safe and orderly closure of the mine, in compliance with the ruling. Federico Alfaro, minister of Commerce and Industries and a vocal supporter of the mining contract, resigned from office on 30 November 2023 amid increasing calls from the public following his involvement in the controversy.

Four people died in the protests: two in traffic incidents while attempting to close roads, while the remaining two (a teacher and another's husband) were fatally shot in a road closure in Chame District by an elderly man with Panamanian and American citizenship. The protests were reported to have caused economic losses of around $2000 million, close to First Quantum's 2022 income from the mine which was 2959 million dollars. 2022 was the year before law 406 was enacted which proposed a minimum $375 million dollar payment in royalties to the government annually depending on the mine's income. With the mine's closure it has been reported that the country has seen a reduction in GDP equivalent to 2514 million dollars or 4.5% of GDP, close to the mine's income in 2022. The mine's top export destinations and main customers were located in China and Japan. The mine had no significant Panamanian or Latin American customers so almost all production was exported. Many protesters were charged with crimes. According to a non public study by Indesa, the mine paid 443 million dollars in salaries annually, and gave 200 million annually to Panama's social security program, enough for one month of its operation. (Note: In Panama, social security retirement funds, although pooled from the population with formal jobs that contribute to social security, are only paid out to individuals based on their average salary throughout their working life.)

== Background ==
=== Prior to 2021 ===
Ever since the 1960s, there has been a gradual push by several panamanian governments usually in succession, to introduce mining and extractive industries to Panama and position them as the main drivers of economic growth and activity in the country, particularly in the country's interior and transitioning Panama away from a transit-based economy or economic model (transitismo in Spanish) which is based on the Panama Canal and Panama's key location in the Americas, into an extractivist economy which would allow the government to take on more debt and prevent tax reforms which could be avoided with a larger GDP number provided by mining.

This push has also been driven by a perceived lack of alternative revenue and economic growth sources which are seen as specially lacking outside the surroundings of the Panama Canal. This extractivist economy or economic model includes not only the mine but also other activities of the primary sector of the economy such as agriculture. Several mining concessions for extraction were granted starting in 1997: Petaquilla and Cerro Quema that same year, Santa Rosa/Cañazas in 2013, and Remance in 2013, which was revoked afterwards and approved again in 2021. With this, mining had become the new source of growth for Panama's GDP. Three mines in Panama have been abandoned and closed improperly: Remance in 1999, Santa Rosa, and Petaquilla Gold, causing distrust among many panamanians towards the mining sector. Remance for example was the subject of a study by the Technological University of Panama which determined that the site was heavily polluted and posed a risk to human health including the risk of causing cancer.

Cobre Panamá is the largest open-pit copper mine in Central America. The exploration process for the mine was started in 1991 during the presidency of Guillermo Endara, who assumed office on 20 December 1989 as the first elected president of Panama since Arnulfo Arias in 1968. The original mining contract for the mine site was given to Petaquilla Gold, S.A. through the Law 9, approved on 26 February 1997 by the National Assembly during the presidency of Ernesto Pérez Balladares.

Richard Fifer, CEO of Petaquilla, sold the concession rights for the mine to First Quantum Minerals (a Canadian-based mining company) for $60 million, with the Panamanian law firm Morgan & Morgan acting as intermediary of the process; however, this action was not allowed by the mining contract of 1997. Juan Carlos Varela, who served as president of Panama from 2014 to 2019, extended the concession for an additional 20 years in 2016. It is reported that all presidents of Panama in the post-intervention era (starting from 1989) have been involved in expanding or supporting the operations of the copper mine, including Mireya Moscoso, Martín Torrijos and Ricardo Martinelli, all of whom served from 1999 to 2014. Former president Juan Carlos Varela praised the mine calling it largest ever foreign investment by a private-sector company in Panama.

Lawyer Juan Ramón Sevillano filed a claim for the unconstitutionality of Law 9 in 1998, which was done again by lawyer Susana Serracín in 2009 but it was not ruled until 2017 and was notified to the parties by the Supreme Court of Justice on 25 September 2018, 21 years later. First Quantum's local subsidiary, Minera Panama, doing business as Cobre Panama, argued that this did not invalidate the mining contract and thus posed no danger to mine development. The panamanian government defended the mining company and the MICI stated the concession was still valid. The ruling was formally published in the government gazette on 2021, three years after the Supreme Court's decision due to legal measures by First Quantum's law firm Morgan & Morgan to delay its publication, even though the ruling was in effect without being published. Despite this the mine's construction continued in 2019 and the mine went into operation that same year and the governments of Juan Carlos Varela and Laurentino Cortizo made efforts to justify these actions. First Quantum Minerals was forced to renegotiate the concession with the government of Panama under President Laurentino Cortizo, while they were illegally exploiting the mine and doing unlawful activities in the area.

=== Negotiations and contract draft ===
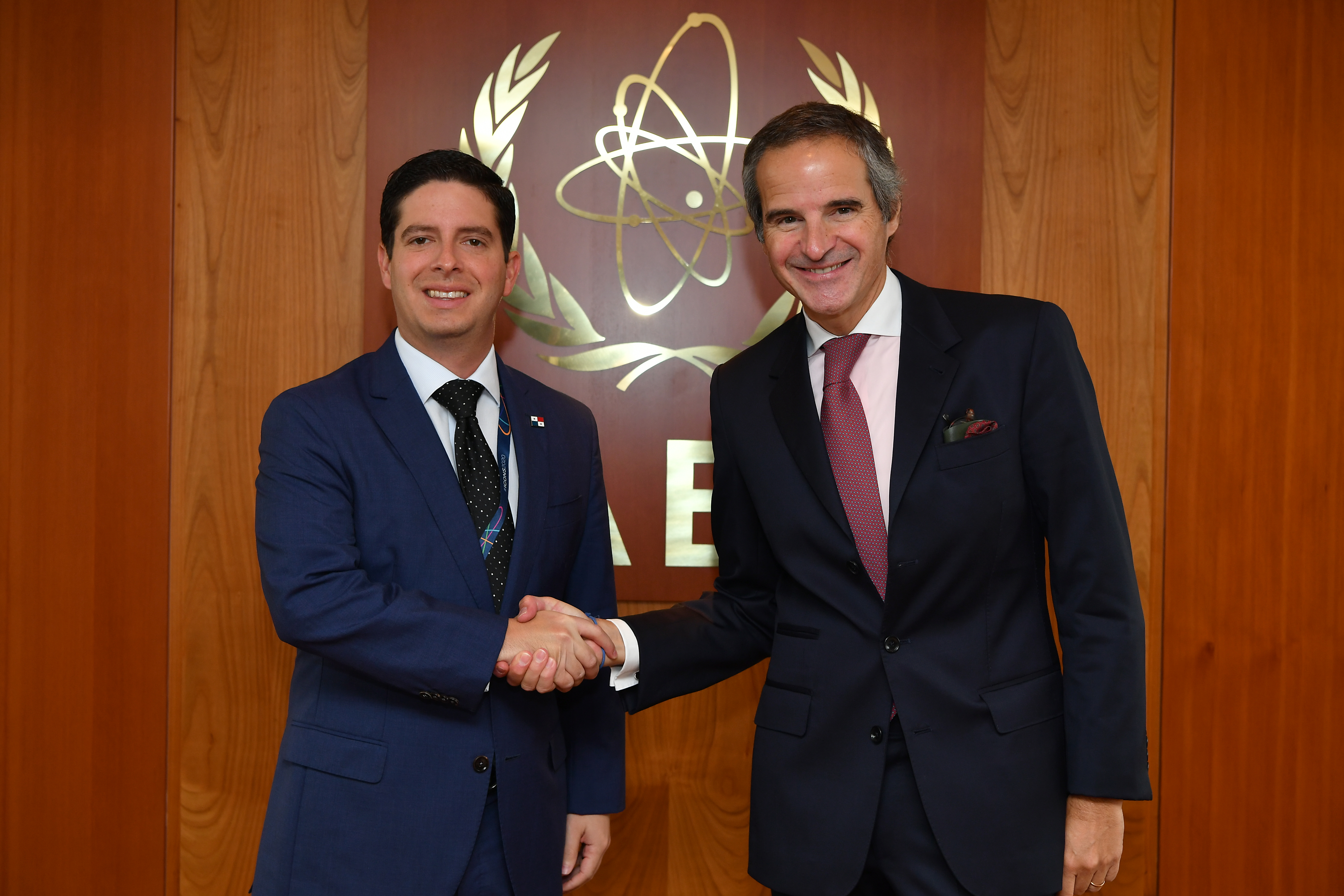
Federico Alfaro (left), minister of Commerce and Industries, who negotiated the mining contract with First Quantum Minerals

Following the publication of the Supreme Court ruling on early 2021, First Quantum Minerals started negotiations with the administration of Laurentino Cortizo to write a new mining contract. As reported by the government, the initial negotiations resulted in expanding the revenue for the Panamanian government to a minimum of $375 million annually given copper prices did not decrease significantly and royalty payments from 12-to-16%; an increase over the 2% laid out in now unconstitutional Law 9. additionally, it was agreed that Cobre Panamá must pay numerous taxes they were exempted of by the 1997 contract. It was reported that these payments would be used for numerous social programs that were underfunded. During the negotiation process doubts against the mine and its contract were raised with some alleging that they represented the absence of the rule of law in Panama. During negotiations with First Quantum, there were disputes over the amount of royalties that would be paid to Panama and this led to a brief mine shutdown in December 2022 and February 2023.

Even though the government of Panama claimed that this mining contract would be beneficial for the people, numerous lawyers and environmental activists denied those claims and insisted that the new concessions would be extremely damaging for the surroundings of Cobre Panamá, and the Panama Canal. The first mining contract draft known as Bill 1043 presented to the National Assembly on 21 August 2023 explicitly authorized First Quantum Minerals to destroy forests surrounding Cobre Panamá if it was determined that they had useful resources to expand the mine, and gave them the right to expropriate land from nearby residents for the same reason. It was also reported that the mine could use and divert the course of numerous nearby rivers, including the Indio river (which flows into the Donoso District), which are potentially interrelated with the Panama Canal water system.

There have been concerns about the mine's impact on groundwater contamination and thus water supply for the Panama canal and thus the country which uses its water supply as drinking water, which have been dismissed repeatedly by First Quantum, whose country manager in Panama, Keith Green, stated that the rivers downstream of the mine site have no users and that the mine is far away from the canal, even though the rivers near the mine site have potential to become sources of water for the Panama Canal. Due to this combined with the country's high water consumption there is concern about the mine's potentially negative impact on the competitiveness of other sectors, particularly the service sector, of the panamanian economy which is primarily service based around the Panama Canal, a situation which could pose an existential threat to the country, rendering its service sector obsolete and additionally the mining sector in the country is in direct competition with the agricultural sector for land and water raising concerns. The company also dismissed the protests.

The expansion of Cobre Panamá would be potentially dangerous for the Mesoamerican Biological Corridor, as the mine is already placed within one of its protected areas, and could threaten the water supply of numerous settlements near the Panama Canal and the Canal itself.

In addition this draft was only available on a website where measures were in place to prevent the draft from being copied or downloaded, so a citizen manually transcribed its contents to distribute them widely. The government also refrained from publishing the contract on mass media such as newspapers. At the same time however the government and First Quantum were investing millions in advertising on mass media to publicize the claimed economic benefits of the mine. This situation started to build up doubt and distrust from large swaths of the country's population about the draft of the mining contract over the course of several months. In particular the contract was seen by some lawyers as establishing an enclave as the mining contract draft also allowed First Quantum to establish and operate sea ports without the need for another contract and without restrictions, as well as the construction of hospitals and shopping malls.

Small protests with a couple dozen people started near the National Assembly building in Panama around this time, where a supposed debate was started in which protesters were not allowed to participate as they would stand in the way of police suppressing protesters when trying to enter the National Assembly building while the mine's workers and spokespeople were allowed to enter through an entrance normally reserved for trusted personnel and lawmakers. Coverage from mass media outlets was severely lacking as they refrained from publishing or broadcasting these protests.

=== Final contract ===
Following nationwide controversy about the content of the original draft, the Panamanian government decided to withdraw it on 3 October 2023 prompted by the National Assembly in violation of its constitutional functions and promised to remove its controversial content such as the establishment of prohibited airspace up to an altitude of 3000 meters above the mine, concerning given the regular flyovers in the mine site done by mass media outlets and a clause that allowed the mine to expropriate land if mineral or other resources determined to be useful to the mine were found. First Quantum's country manager Keith Green argued prohibited airspace was necessary due to safety reasons and defended the expropriation clause. Minister Federico Alfaro re-introduced the amended contract now known as Bill 1100 on October 16 to the National Assembly and it was approved by a standing committee on 18 October 2023 with a 7–2 vote as shown in the table below.

National Assembly's Commerce Committee
	Roberto Ábrego	Ariel Alba	Francisco Alemán	Víctor Castillo	Alaín Cedeño	Nelson Jackson	Cenobia Vargas	Juan Diego Vásquez	Elías Vigil
	PRD (13-4)	PRD (9-2)	MOLIRENA (8-2)	PRD (8-4)	CD (8-6)	CD (3-2)	PRD (8-6)	Unaffiliated (8-2)	PAN (8-6)
Vote	✓ Yes	✓ Yes	✓ Yes	✓ Yes	✓ Yes	✓ Yes	✓ Yes	✗ No	✗ No

The plenary session of the National Assembly approved the Bill 1100, which legalized the mining contract between First Quantum Minerals and the government of Panama, in second and third debate within a timespan of less than 48 hours following the committee's vote. In the second debate, held on 19 October 2023, 58 of the 71 members (81.69%) voted; while in the third debate, held on 20 October 2023, 50 of the 71 members (70.42%) voted.

National Assembly's second and third debate vote
Member		Electoral district		Votes by debate	
Name	Party	Number	Areas included	Second	Third
Bocas del Toro Province
Abel Beker	PRD	1-1	Almirante, Bocas del Toro, Changuinola, Chiriquí Grande	✓ Yes	✓ Yes
Benicio Robinson	PRD	1-1	Almirante, Bocas del Toro, Changuinola, Chiriquí Grande	—N/a	✓ Yes
Coclé Province
Néstor Guardia	PRD	2-1	Penonomé	✓ Yes	—N/a
Daniel Ramos	PRD	2-1	Penonomé	abstention	abstention
Melchor Herrera	PRD	2-2	Antón	✓ Yes	✓ Yes
Luis Ernesto Carles	PAN	2.3	La Pintada, Natá, Olá	—N/a	—N/a
Bernardino González	PAN	2-4	Aguadulce	✓ Yes	✓ Yes
Colón Province
Leopoldo Benedetti	CD	3-1	Colón	✓ Yes	✓ Yes
Mariano López	PRD	3-1	Colón	✓ Yes	—N/a
Jairo Salazar	PRD	3-1	Colón	✓ Yes	✓ Yes
Pedro Torres	PAN	3-1	Colón	✗ No	—N/a
Nelson Jackson	CD	3-2	Chagres, Donoso, Omar Torrijos Herrera, Portobelo, Santa Isabel	✓ Yes	—N/a
Chiriquí Province
Fernando Arce	PRD	4-1	David	✓ Yes	✓ Yes
Miguel Fanovich	MOLIRENA	4-1	David	✓ Yes	✓ Yes
Hugo Méndez	PAN	4-1	David	✗ No	—N/a
Everardo Concepción	PAN	4-2	Barú	✓ Yes	✓ Yes
Rony Araúz	CD	4-3	Bugaba, Tierras Altas	—N/a	—N/a
Juan Esquivel	PRD	4-3	Bugaba, Tierras Altas	✓ Yes	✓ Yes
Gonzalo González	PRD	4-4	Alanje, Boquerón, Renacimiento	✓ Yes	✓ Yes
Manolo Ruiz	MOLIRENA	4-5	Boquete, Dolega, Gualaca	✓ Yes	✓ Yes
Ana Giselle Rosas	CD	4-6	San Félix, San Lorenzo, Remedios, Tolé	—N/a	—N/a
Darién Province, Emberá-Wounaan Comarca
Arnulfo Díaz	CD	5-1	Chepigana, Santa Fe, Sambú	✓ Yes	✓ Yes
Jaime Vargas	PRD	5-2	Pinogana, Cémaco	✓ Yes	✓ Yes
Herrera Province
Alejandro Castillero	PRD	6-1	Chitré	✓ Yes	✓ Yes
Julio Mendoza	PRD	6-2	Los Pozos, Parita, Pesé	✓ Yes	✓ Yes
Marcos Castillero	PRD	6-3	Las Minas, Ocú, Santa María	✓ Yes	✓ Yes
Los Santos Province
Eric Broce	PRD	7-1	Guararé, Las Tablas, Pedasí, Pocrí	✓ Yes	✓ Yes
Olivares de Frías	PRD	7-2	Los Santos, Macaracas, Tonosí	✓ Yes	✓ Yes
Panamá Province
Hernán Delgado	CD	8-1	Balboa, Chepo, Chimán, Taboga	✓ Yes	✓ Yes
Itzi Atencio	PAN	8-2	San Miguelito	—N/a	—N/a
Francisco Alemán	MOLIRENA	8-2	San Miguelito	✓ Yes	✓ Yes
Leandro Ávila	PRD	8-2	San Miguelito	✓ Yes	✓ Yes
Dalia Bernal	CD	8-2	San Miguelito	✓ Yes	—N/a
Raúl Pineda	PRD	8-2	San Miguelito	✓ Yes	—N/a
Zulay Rodríguez	PRD	8-2	San Miguelito	✗ No	✗ No
Juan Diego Vásquez	Unaffiliated	8-2	San Miguelito	✗ No	✗ No
Crispiano Adames	PRD	8-3	Panamá District Ancón, Bella Vista, Bethania, Calidonia, Curundú, El Chorrillo, Pueblo Nuevo, San Felipe, Santa Ana	abstention	abstention
Héctor Brands	PRD	8-3	Panamá District Ancón, Bella Vista, Bethania, Calidonia, Curundú, El Chorrillo, Pueblo Nuevo, San Felipe, Santa Ana	✓ Yes	✓ Yes
Corina Cano	MOLIRENA	8-3	Panamá District Ancón, Bella Vista, Bethania, Calidonia, Curundú, El Chorrillo, Pueblo Nuevo, San Felipe, Santa Ana	✓ Yes	✓ Yes
Sergio Gálvez	CD	8-3	Panamá District Ancón, Bella Vista, Bethania, Calidonia, Curundú, El Chorrillo, Pueblo Nuevo, San Felipe, Santa Ana	—N/a	—N/a
Gabriel Silva	Unaffiliated	8-3	Panamá District Ancón, Bella Vista, Bethania, Calidonia, Curundú, El Chorrillo, Pueblo Nuevo, San Felipe, Santa Ana	✗ No	✗ No
Edison Broce	Unaffiliated	8-4	Panamá District Don Bosco, Juan Díaz, Parque Lefevre, Río Abajo, San Francisco	✗ No	✗ No
Víctor Castillo	PRD	8-4	Panamá District Don Bosco, Juan Díaz, Parque Lefevre, Río Abajo, San Francisco	✓ Yes	✓ Yes
Mayín Correa	CD	8-4	Panamá District Don Bosco, Juan Díaz, Parque Lefevre, Río Abajo, San Francisco	—N/a	—N/a
Raúl Fernández	Unaffiliated	8-4	Panamá District Don Bosco, Juan Díaz, Parque Lefevre, Río Abajo, San Francisco	✗ No	✗ No
Javier Sucre	PRD	8-4	Panamá District Don Bosco, Juan Díaz, Parque Lefevre, Río Abajo, San Francisco	—N/a	—N/a
Génesis Arjona	CD	8-5	Panamá District Alcalde Díaz, Caimitillo, Chilibre, Ernesto Córdoba Campos, Las Cumbres	—N/a	—N/a
Alina González	PRD	8-5	Panamá District Alcalde Díaz, Caimitillo, Chilibre, Ernesto Córdoba Campos, Las Cumbres	✓ Yes	✓ Yes
Ardito Rodríguez	MOLIRENA	8-5	Panamá District Alcalde Díaz, Caimitillo, Chilibre, Ernesto Córdoba Campos, Las Cumbres	✓ Yes	✓ Yes
Alaín Cedeño	CD	8-6	Panamá District 24 de Diciembre, Las Garzas, Las Mañanitas, Pacora, Pedregal, San Martín, Tocumen	✓ Yes	✓ Yes
Cenobia Vargas	PRD	8-6	Panamá District 24 de Diciembre, Las Garzas, Las Mañanitas, Pacora, Pedregal, San Martín, Tocumen	✓ Yes	✓ Yes
Elías Vigil	PAN	8-6	Panamá District 24 de Diciembre, Las Garzas, Las Mañanitas, Pacora, Pedregal, San Martín, Tocumen	✗ No	—N/a
Edwin Zúñiga	CD	8-6	Panamá District 24 de Diciembre, Las Garzas, Las Mañanitas, Pacora, Pedregal, San Martín, Tocumen	—N/a	—N/a
Panamá Oeste Province
Kayra Harding	PRD	13-1	Arraiján	✓ Yes	✓ Yes
Yesenia Rodríguez	PAN	13-1	Arraiján	—N/a	—N/a
Marilyn Vallarino	CD	13-1	Arraiján	✓ Yes	✓ Yes
Yanibel Ábrego	CD	13-2	Capira	✓ Yes	✓ Yes
José Herrera	CD	13-3	Chame, San Carlos	✓ Yes	✓ Yes
Roberto Ábrego	PRD	13-4	La Chorrera	✓ Yes	✓ Yes
Roberto Ayala	PRD	13-4	La Chorrera	✓ Yes	✓ Yes
Lilia Batista	CD	13-4	La Chorrera	—N/a	—N/a
Veraguas Province
Fátima Agrazal	CD	9-1	Santiago	✓ Yes	✓ Yes
Luis Rafael Cruz	PRD	9-1	Santiago	✓ Yes	✓ Yes
Ariel Alba	PRD	9-2	La Mesa, Las Palmas, Soná	✓ Yes	✓ Yes
Eugenio Bernal	PRD	9-3	Calobre, Cañazas, San Francisco, Santa Fe	✗ No	—N/a
Ricardo Torres	PRD	9-4	Atalaya, Mariato, Montijo, Río de Jesús	✓ Yes	✓ Yes
Guna Yala Comarca
Petita Ayarza	PRD	10-1	Ailigandí, Madugandí Comarca, Narganá	—N/a	✓ Yes
Arquesio Arias	PRD	10-2	Ailigandí, Puerto Obaldía, Tubualá, Wargandí Comarca	✓ Yes	✓ Yes
Ngäbe-Buglé Comarca
Leopoldo Archibold	CD	12-1	Jirondai, Kankintú, Kusapín, Santa Catalina o Calovébora	—N/a	—N/a
Adán Bejerano	Unaffiliated	12-2	Besikó, Mironó, Nole Duima	—N/a	—N/a
Ricardo Santo	PRD	12-3	Müna, Ñürum	✓ Yes	—N/a
Results of the vote by debate				✓ 47	✓ 43
Results of the vote by debate				✗ 9	✗ 5
Source: National Assembly of Panamá

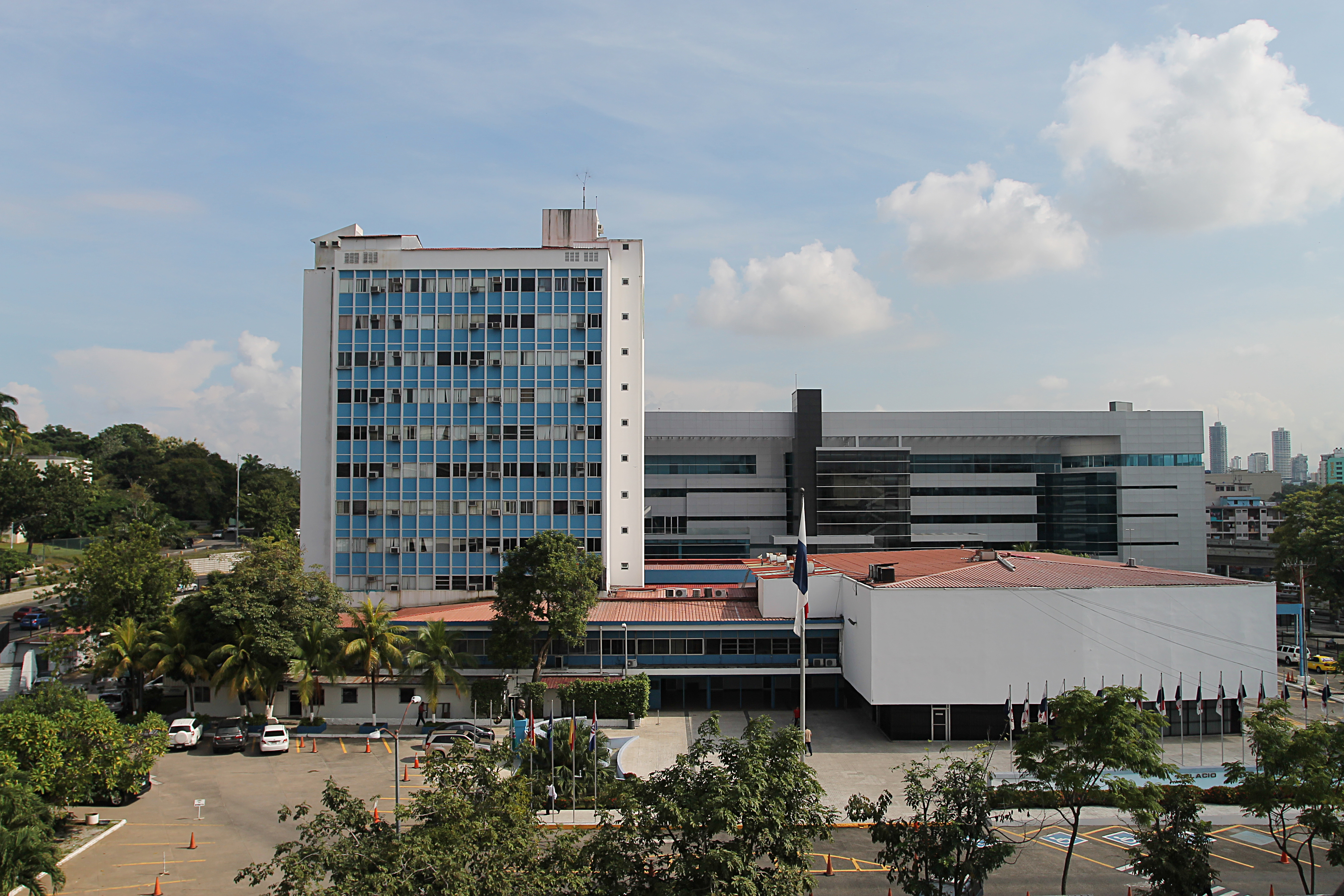
Seat of the National Assembly in Panama City, Panama

All but two of the present members of the PRD, all members of the MOLIRENA, two members (Everardo Concepción and Bernardino González) of the Panameñista Party, and 9 members of Democratic Change (all from the supporting coalition of former president Ricardo Martinelli) voted in support of the mining contract during the second debate. Nine members voted in opposition: Eugenio Bernal and Zulay Rodríguez from the PRD; Hugo Méndez, Pedro Torres and Elías Vigil from the Panameñista Party; and unaffiliated members Edison Broce, Raúl Fernández, Gabriel Silva and Juan Diego Vásquez.

In the third debate, 41 members repeated their votes in support of the mining contract, with PRD members Petita Ayarza and Benicio Robinson joining them for the first time. Six members who voted in support but missed this debate: Ricardo Santo, Raúl Pineda, Mariano López and Néstor Guardia from the PRD; Dalia Bernal and Nelson Jackson from Democratic Change. On the other hand, five members voted in opposition during the third debate: Zulay Rodríguez from the PRD; and unaffiliated members Edison Broce, Raúl Fernández, Gabriel Silva and Juan Diego Vásquez. Four members voted in opposition but missed this debate: Eugenio Bernal from the PRD; Hugo Méndez, Pedro Torres and Elías Vigil from the Panameñista Party. Less than 12 hours after the approval by the National Assembly, President Laurentino Cortizo signed into law the mining contract as Law 406 of 20 October 2023, with unanimous consent of the members of the Council of Ministers. It was posted on the government gazette the same day at night. Due to the short timespan over which the debates occurred and the law was signed into effect, there was no effective discussion on it within the National Assembly nor the President's office. The debates took place over the course of 3 days in succession, which was unusually fast for any law presented to the national assembly.

== Controversies ==
=== Conflict of interest ===
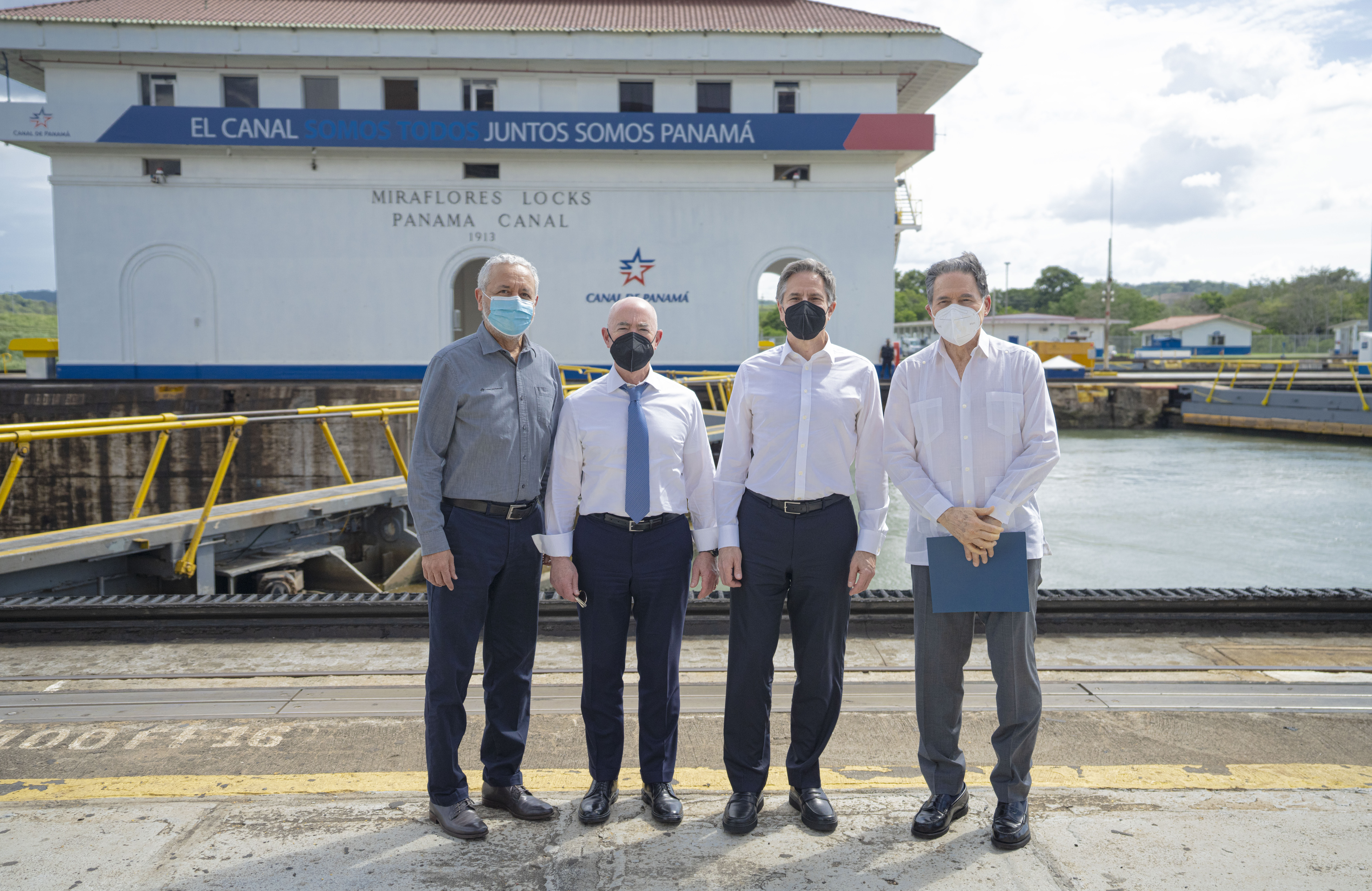
Arístides Royo (right), minister of Canal Affairs, during a visit to the Panama Canal by U.S. secretary of State Antony Blinken and secretary of Homeland Security Alejandro Mayorkas (19 April 2022)

La Prensa, a Panamanian newspaper, reported numerous infringements of the regulations concerning conflict of interest, related to the mining contract, by three ministers of the administration of Laurentino Cortizo: Federico Alfaro, minister of Commerce and Industries; Arístides Royo, minister of Canal Affairs and former president of Panama; and Rafael Sabonge, minister of Public Works. As reported by the newspaper, they infringed these laws for the following reasons:

- Federico Alfaro, minister of Commerce and Industries, requested the solicitor general Rigoberto González to not announce any opinion related to the negotiation and approval of law 406, as González warned the administration of Cortizo about repeating the same errors that eventually made unconstitutional the 1997 mining contract.
- Arístides Royo, minister of Canal Affairs, voted in favour of the mining contract during a vote in the Council of Ministers as a member of the law firm Morgan & Morgan, which is responsible for defending the interests of First Quantum Minerals over Cobre Panamá.
- Rafael Sabonge, minister of Public Works, voted in favour of the mining contract during a vote in the Council of Ministers as he is CEO of a real estate company that is building a residential project for employees of Cobre Panamá.
- Even though he is not mentioned in this article, La Prensa also reported that cabinet advisor José A. Rojas Pardini is a founding partner of the real estate company headed by Rafael Sabonge, minister of Public Works, which is related to a residential project for employees of Cobre Panamá.

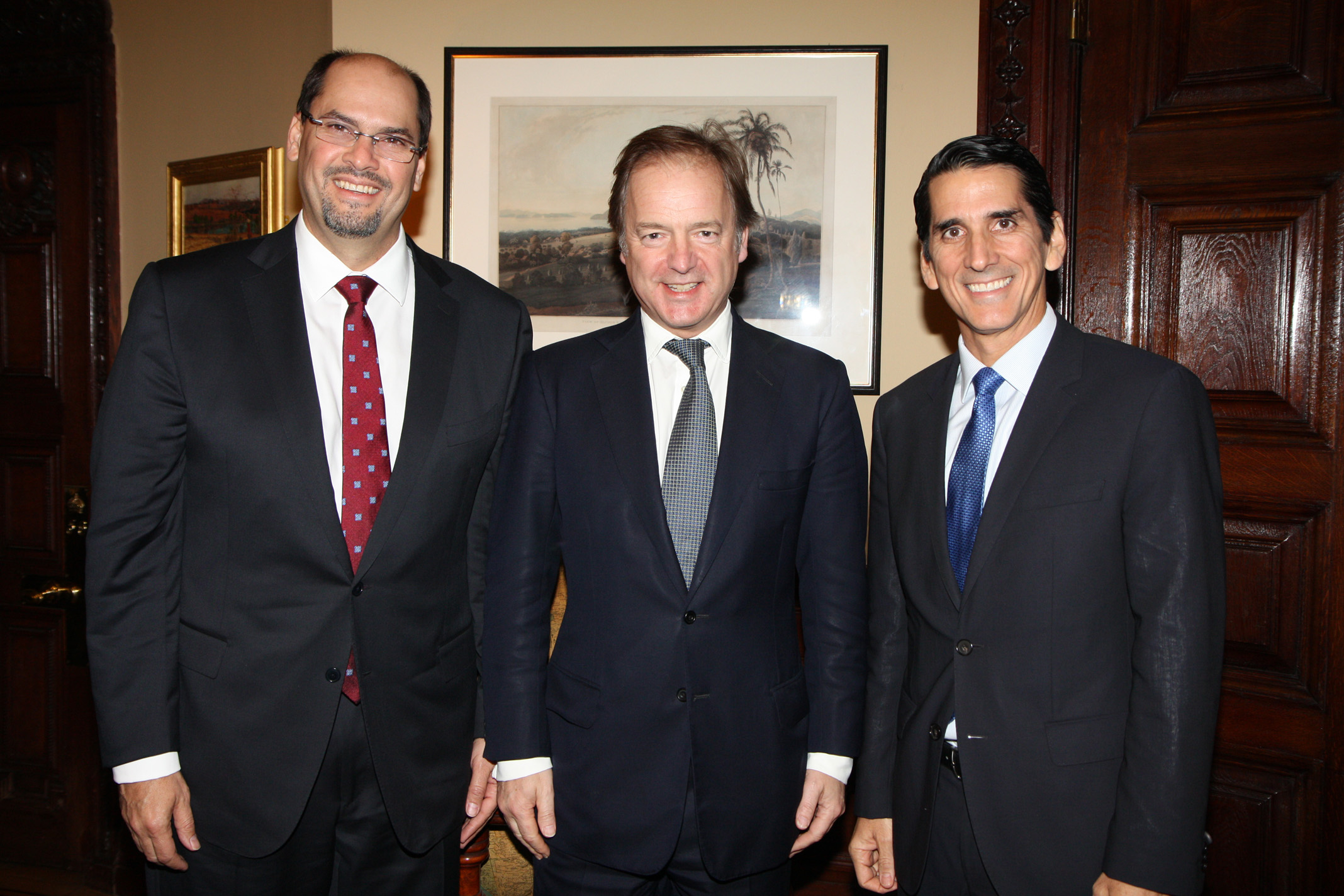
Rómulo Roux (right), meeting with Hugo Swire, British Minister of State for Europe and the Americas (17 December 2013)

Incumbent vice president and 2024 presidential candidate José Gabriel Carrizo was also reported of infringing conflict of interest regulations as he served as lawyer for Petaquilla Minerals and later Petaquilla Gold. Petaquilla Minerals was the early owner of Cobre Panamá, of which his mother Lydia Jaén de Carrizo served as executive. The political campaign for 2024 of his party the PRD, is also reported to have received undisclosed political donations from another mining company, Orla Mining which also seeks to operate another mine in Panama at Cerro Quema, and several members of his personal network which were also associated with the political campaign were also reported to have ties with the Petaquilla mine which would later be operated by First Quantum. The Tribunal Electoral has no means to audit and thus publish political donations. The network included Bagatrac, a controversial company run by high-ranking members of the government at the time. Additionally company ownership information in Panama is restricted information (confidential information) only available to company owners and certain lawyers.

Another 2024 presidential candidate, Rómulo Roux, who served as minister of Foreign Affairs during the presidency of Ricardo Martinelli and the current president of Democratic Change, is also heavily involved with First Quantum Minerals as a member of the law firm Morgan & Morgan; Roux has been a vocal supporter of the mining contract, and criticized politicians who opposed it saying that "They should stop talking crap" during a YouTube podcast with OliMezaTV.

== Aftermath ==
=== Supreme Court decision ===
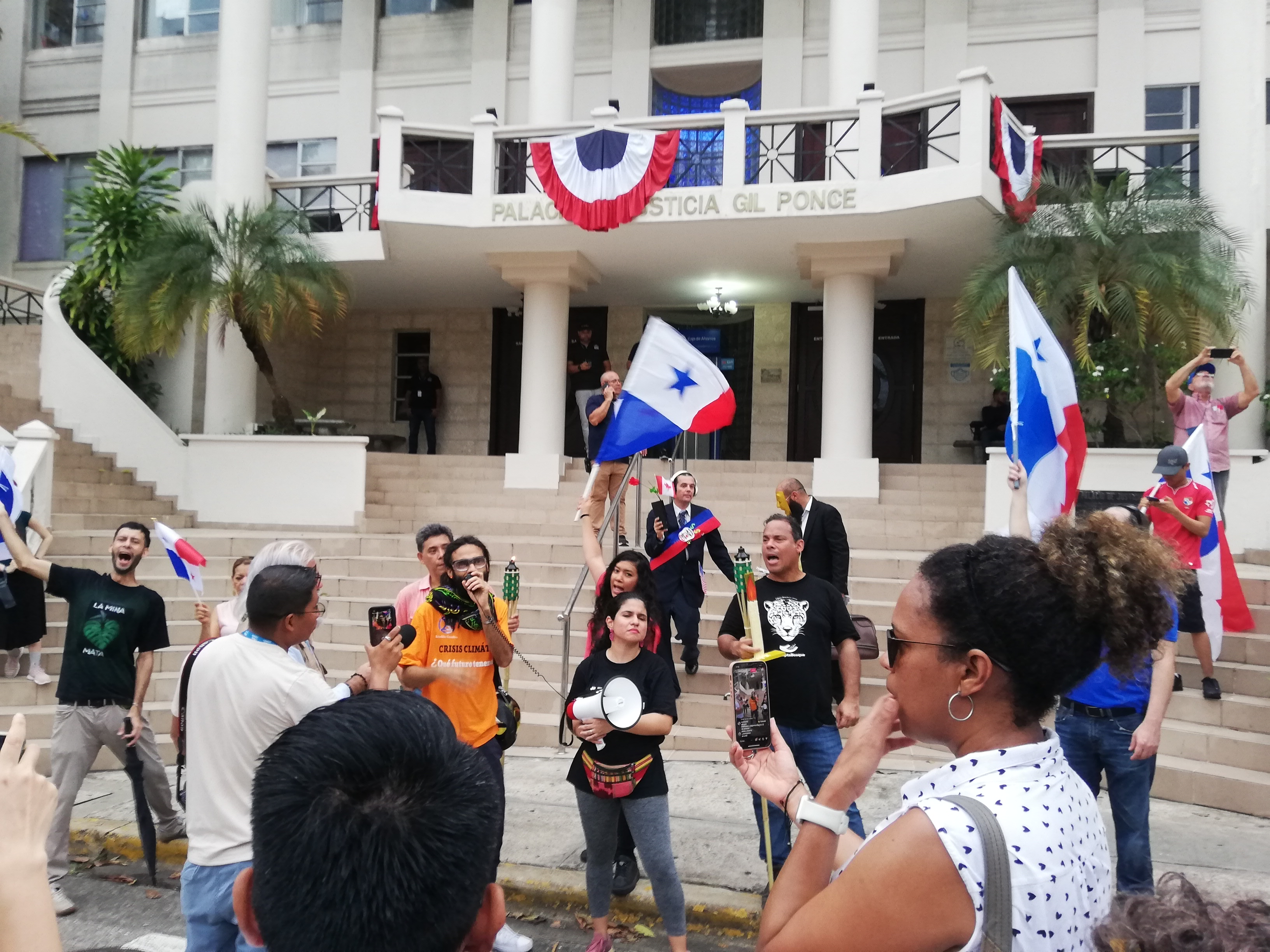
Protesters in front of the seat of the Supreme Court, Panama City

Early reports surfaced suggesting the Supreme Court was likely to rule against the mining contract in Law 406. On 28 November 2023, the 9 justices of the Supreme Court of Justice unanimously ruled the mining contract Law 406, signed into law by President Laurentino Cortizo the previous month, as unconstitutional. Through a 234-page document containing arguments of plaintiffs Juan Ramón Sevillano and Martita Cornejo, solicitor general Rigoberto González, and 90 legal opinions from numerous lawyers in support or opposition of the unconstitutionality of the mining contract. Pressure from society caused the court to enter a permanent session and according to lawyer Rodrigo Noriega they did not influence the court's decision as the unconstitutionality of law 9 was upheld.

The justices determined that the mining contract in law 406 between First Quantum Minerals and the government of Panama infringed twenty-five articles of the Panamanian constitution, including numerous articles concerning the sovereignty, the duty of preserving people's safety, the fundamental rights, a lack of public consultation due to the quick approval of the contract in just 3 subsequent days and international law: articles 4, 17, 18, 19, 20, 32, 43, 46, 56, 109, 118, 119, 120, 121, 124, 159 (sections 10 and 15), 163 (section 1), 200 (section 3), 257 (section 5), 258, 259, 266, 285, 286 and 298 As the Supreme Court also upheld their 2017 ruling of the previous Law 9 that allowed the mine to operate before Law 406 was enacted, and reported that First Quantum Minerals illegally exploited the mine for the span between 2021 and 2023, María Eugenia López (chief justice of the Supreme Court) said during the public announcement of the ruling that the mining contract would be removed from the Panamanian regulatory system; therefore, the government of Panama must ensure the orderly and safe shutting down of the operation of First Quantum Minerals in Panamanian territory. Official Gazette No. 29685-D in December 2022 published a closure order for the mine due to the unconstitutionality of Law 9, which was not enforced. On 29 November 2023, President Laurentino Cortizo ordered the closure of the mine. The ruling was published in the government gazette four days later, on 2 December 2023, effectively ending the protests in the country.

=== Public reaction ===
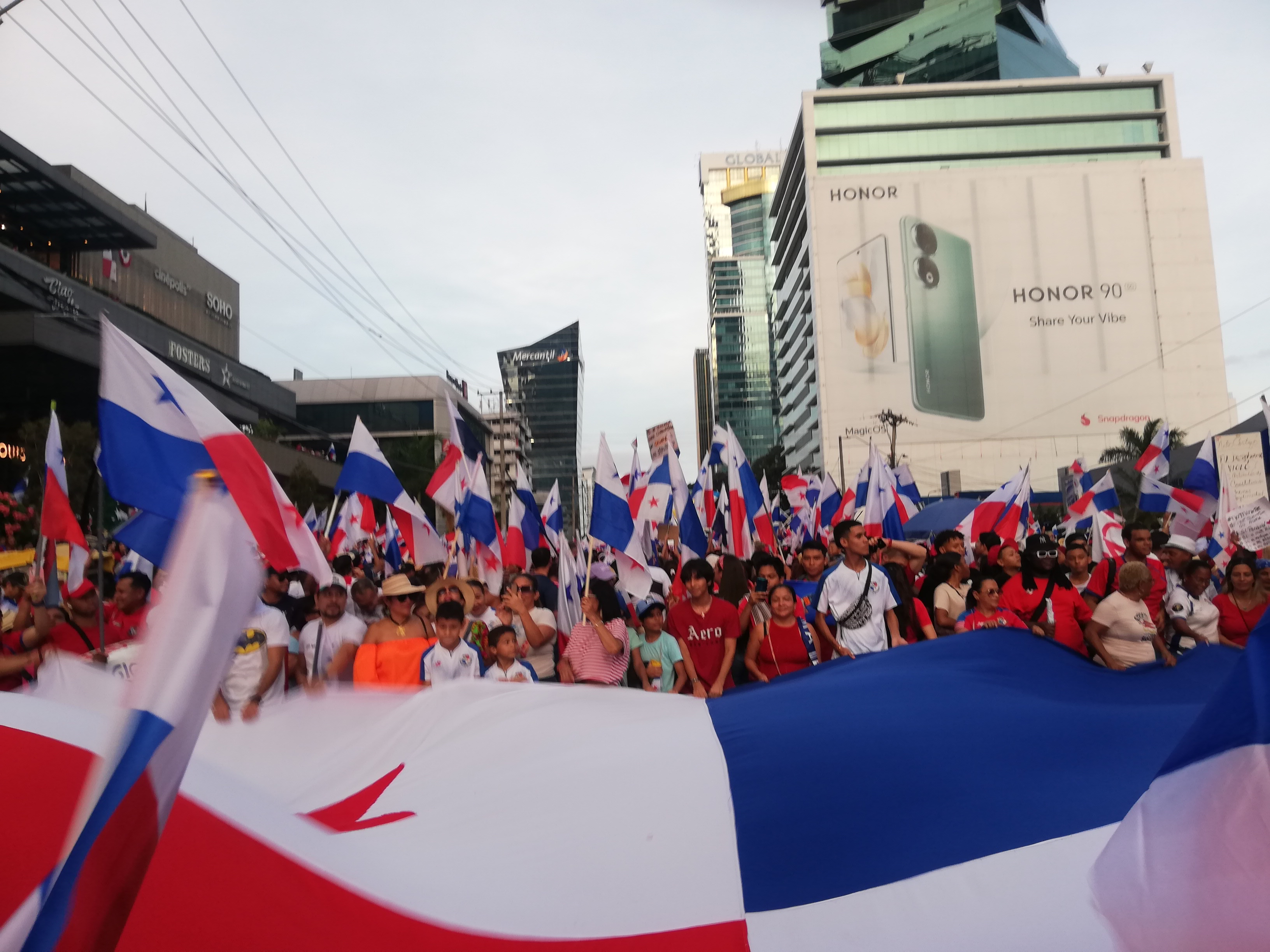
Protesters celebrating the Supreme Court's ruling in the center of Panama City, 28 November 2023

The Supreme Court's ruling was widely supported by the people and numerous lawyers, and celebrations erupted throughout the country. The plaintiffs Juan Ramón Sevillano and Martita Cornejo, who were also prominent leaders of the demonstrations, celebrated the ruling and called it an outstanding victory following weeks of protests opposing the mining contract. There were numerous celebrations in Panama City, with the hotspot being in the financial center located in San Francisco, and other major cities and towns.

Protesters decided to withdraw most road closures throughout the Pan-American Highway and other minor roads, and basic products started to be distributed again throughout Panama. Teachers agreed to dismiss their labor strike on 2 December 2023 and in-person classes were resumed in all Panamanian state and private schools on 6 December. On the same day, 2 December, protesters agreed to withdraw the remaining road closures in Chiriquí Province following the publication of the Supreme Court ruling in the government gazette.

Public opinion of the administration of Laurentino Cortizo and most members of the National Assembly was severely damaged, with the governing parties PRD and MOLIRENA getting poor support and candidates' stance on mining in Panama becoming a flashpoint for the upcoming general elections. These protests are the largest held during the Panamanian post-intervention era, as the largest demonstrations since the National Civic Crusade between 1987 and 1989 in opposition to the dictatorship of Manuel Noriega (supported by the PRD).

This situation brought attention to several abandoned open pit mines in Panama, including Remance, Santa Rosa and the Petaquilla gold mine which is very close to the Cobre Panama mine, and a technical committee part of the International Union for Conservation of Nature (IUCN) was formed by volunteers to properly close and perform mine reclamation on these mines including Cobre Panama.

=== 2024 general election ===
Following the general election on 5 May 2024, the governing coalition of PRD and MOLIRENA suffered major losses in both national and local elections, with the PRD getting its worst-ever electoral result. Its candidate, incumbent vice president José Gabriel Carrizo, came in sixth place with 5.88% of the vote; and they lost a total of 26 seats in the National Assembly, with most of the members who voted for the mining contract being ousted. Rómulo Roux, candidate of CD and Panameñista Party and a vocal supporter of the mining contract, came in fourth place with 11.38% of the vote and the coalition lost 10 seats in the National Assembly (with none of the previous members being reelected), including 3 seats allocated to members who were reelected as members of Realizing Goals.

=== First Quantum's response ===
After law 406 was ruled unconstitutional, First Quantum through its subsidiary Minera Panamá which operates Cobre Panamá, argued that the unconstitutionality ruling did not invalidate the mining agreement that allowed the mine to operate, but no such agreement was found by Panama's comptroller general. Following Panama's 2024 general election, the mining company expressed its anticipation of engaging in dialogue with the new government. In its latest statement, the company noted, "We look forward to a dialogue with a new government and working together once it takes office to find a resolution that is in Panama's best interest." First Quantum seeks to engage in negotiations to reopen the mine.

After the mine's closure, in 2024 and 2025, First Quantum started to offer tours to the mine site which were not authorized by the Ministry of Commerce, because any such visits need to be arranged by the government and not the company, and since 2023 has engaged in a public relations outreach campaign to improve panamanians' perception of the mine, called Cobre Conecta, which engages in several types of media. The campaign aims to highlight claimed economic benefits of the mine and position it as a beneficial activity for the country due to its economic activity, with economic activity being panamanians' top concern. According to First Quantum's public relations manager in Panama and mine executive Maru Galvez, this strategy has worked and the number of people against the mine has decreased and the program has as its goal the granting of a social license to restart the mine according to a statement from 25 February. When confronted about the mine visits by former lawmaker and lawyer Juan Diego Vázquez, Gálvez responded that Cobre Panamá is a legal company in Panama.

The mine's worker's union UTRAMIPA on 13 February 2025, carried out a protest to request the reopening of the mine. Another, supported by the mine, was carried out in June.

=== Mulino's government ===
Royal Bank of Canada analyst Sam Crittenden commented on José Raúl Mulino's victory as president of Panama, stating that it is a positive development for First Quantum. However, he also emphasized the existing uncertainty surrounding the Cobre Panama project and the need to improve public perception of mining. Crittenden highlighted that negotiations with the new government are necessary before any potential reopening of the project. Mulino has stated that no environmental risks exist at the mine site and that the protests that led to the mine's closure were caused by the handling of the mine by the government at the time. He has proposed reopening the mine so that it can finance its own closure.

Mulino met with the mine's providers on February 24, 2025, after a letter was sent by them on February 10, 2025, who expressed concern over the mine's continued closure. They request that the mine be restarted to prevent bankruptcy or closure of their companies. They stated that over 70% have had to lay off personnel as a result of the mine's closure and requested that the mine be opened in 2025. Many of these companies had the mine as their main or even sole customer.

Mulino on February 27 lamented the closure of the mine, highlighting the stranded assets of many local mine suppliers and calling the situation sad and depressing. Mulino stated he will not engage in negotiations with the mine unless its arbitration proceedings are suspended. First Quantum stock rose once Mulino mentioned that "Novel ideas" were being explored for the future of the mine. Mulino is friendlier to business than his predecessor and stated he would deal with the mine once the country's social security reform is complete. He said that the economic troubles the country is going through were caused in large part by the mine's closure.

The CSS's director, Dino Mon, on March 16, 2025, proposed the use of income from the mine to finance the pension funds of the country, amid public opposition to restart the mine. This had been proposed earlier by former president Laurentino Cortizo in 2023 during the protests.

On March 23, 2025, the minister of the environment stated there have been findings at the mine site that could incur fines.

On April 24, 2025, Mulino stated the mine would be exploited (reopened) without a contract, opting for the framework of an association, in order to bypass the National Assembly who he said is unwilling to approve such a contract. According to lawyer Juan Ramón Sevillano, who presented an unconstitutionality lawsuit against contract law 406 for the mine, although the panamanian constitution does not explicitly ban mining, the ruling of the supreme court against law 406 deemed mining to be incompatible with the panamanian constitution. Mulino cited again the 5% loss of GDP caused by the mine's closure. In a podcast, he stated that he was answering to the country and not to a small group of people, mentioning there were large swaths of people who were left without a job.

According to Panama's mining chamber and Roderick Gutiérrez, its president, over 54,000 indirect jobs were lost. This is higher than published in a non public study by Indesa which mentioned over 40,000 jobs, which in turn is higher than the figure of 35,000 reported earlier. According to an earnings call First Quantum had laid off 4,000 employees. According to First Quantum, the company had around 68000 employees. Panama as of 2024 is estimated to have 4.5 million people.

A report published by Panamanian newspaper La Prensa argues entities with relationships to First Quantum Minerals, majority owner of the Cobre mine, Panama, have engaged in coordinated astroturfing-like campaigns in order to shift public opinion in favor of restarting mining activities, against popular public opinion. When the company's local PR manager was confronted about it, she did not directly address the campaign and defended their intent.
