= 2025 Little League World Series qualification =

United States
- Great Lakes winner: Clarendon Hills, Illinois
- Metro winner: Fairfield, Connecticut
- Mid-Atlantic winner: Upper Uwchlan Township, Pennsylvania
- Midwest winner: Sioux Falls, South Dakota
- Mountain winner: Las Vegas, Nevada
- New England winner: Braintree, Massachusetts
- Northwest winner: (Washington (state)) Bonney Lake, Washington
- Southeast winner: Irmo, South Carolina
- Southwest winner: Richmond, Texas
- West winner: Honolulu, Hawaii

International
- Asia-Pacific winner: Taipei, Chinese Taipei
- Australia winner: Brisbane, Queensland
- Canada winner: Vancouver, British Columbia
- Caribbean winner: Santa Cruz, Aruba
- Europe and Africa winner: Brno, Czech Republic
- Japan winner: Tokyo
- Latin America winner: Barquisimeto, Venezuela
- Mexico winner: (Chihuahua (state)) Chihuahua, Chihuahua
- Panama winner: Arraiján, Panamá Oeste
- Puerto Rico winner: Yabucoa

Tournaments

Qualification for the 2025 Little League World Series took place in ten United States regions and ten international regions from February through August 2025.

== United States ==
=== Great Lakes ===
The tournament took place in Whitestown, Indiana from August 2–6.

State	City	LL Organization	Record
Illinois	Clarendon Hills	Clarendon Hills	3–1
Indiana	Brownsburg	Brownsburg	0–2
Kentucky	Lexington	Lexington Eastern	2–2
Michigan	Negaunee	Negaunee	0–2
Ohio	Hamilton	West Side	3–1

Upper round 1
August 2 – Game 1
Kentucky	0
Ohio	7
Lower round 1
August 3 – Game 4 (F/7)
Kentucky	4
Indiana	3

Upper round 2
August 3 – Game 3
Michigan	0
Ohio	8
August 2 – Game 2
Illinois	4
Indiana	3
Lower round 2
August 4 – Game 5
Michigan	1
Kentucky	6

Upper final
August 4 – Game 6 (F/4)
Ohio	11
Illinois	1
Lower final
August 5 – Game 7
Illinois	5
Kentucky	2

Final
August 6 – Championship
Ohio	4
Illinois	9

=== Metro ===
The tournament took place in Bristol, Connecticut from August 2–8.

State	City	LL Organization	Record
Connecticut	Fairfield	Fairfield National	3–1
New Jersey	Jackson	Jackson Holbrook	1–2
New York	Smithtown	St. James/Smithtown	2–1
Rhode Island	Burrillville	Burrillville	0–2

August 2 – Game 1 (F/7)
New Jersey	1
August 4 – Game 4
Connecticut	2
Connecticut	1
August 2 – Game 2
New York	6
New York	18
August 8 – Championship (F/4)
Rhode Island	0
New York	1
Connecticut	12
August 6 – Game 5 (F/7)
Connecticut	3
August 3 – Game 3 (F/3)
New Jersey	0
New Jersey	15
Rhode Island	0

=== Mid-Atlantic ===
The tournament took place in Bristol, Connecticut from August 3–8.

State	City	LL Organization	Record
Delaware	Middletown	M-O-T	1–2
Maryland	Germantown	Montgomery County	2–2
Pennsylvania	Upper Uwchlan Township	Glenmoore Eagle	3–0
Washington, D.C.		Capitol Hill	0–2

August 3 – Game 1
Pennsylvania	7
August 5 – Game 4
Maryland	2
Pennsylvania	7
August 3 – Game 2
Delaware	3
Washington, D.C.	7
August 8 – Championship
Delaware	8
Pennsylvania	7
Maryland	1
August 7 – Game 5
Delaware	4
August 4 – Game 3
Maryland	8
Maryland	12
Washington D.C.	5

=== Midwest ===
The tournament took place in Whitestown, Indiana from August 1–8.

State	City	LL Organization	Record
Iowa	Eldridge	North Scott	2–2
Kansas	Pittsburg	J.L. Hutchinson Baseball	0–2
Minnesota	Circle Pines	Centennial Lakes	0–2
Missouri	Webb City	Webb City	1–2
Nebraska	Kearney	Kearney	3–2
North Dakota	Fargo	Fargo	3–1
South Dakota	Sioux Falls	Sioux Falls	4–1
Wisconsin	Whitefish Bay	Whitefish Bay	1–2

Upper round 1	Upper round 2	Upper final	Final
August 1 – Game 1
Minnesota	4
August 2 – Game 5
North Dakota	10
North Dakota	3
August 1 – Game 2
Wisconsin	2
Nebraska	5
August 6 – Game 12
Wisconsin	13
North Dakota	5
August 1 – Game 3
South Dakota	4
South Dakota	7
August 2 – Game 6
Iowa	0
South Dakota	2
August 1 – Game 4
Missouri	0
Missouri	6	August 8 – Championship
Kansas	0	North Dakota	0
South Dakota	6
Lower round 1	Lower round 2	Lower round 3	Lower final
August 4 – Game 9 (F/5)
August 3 – Game 7	Missouri	3	August 7 – Game 13
Minnesota	5	Nebraska	13	August 5 – Game 11	South Dakota	3
Nebraska	10	Nebraska	5	Nebraska	1
August 4 – Game 10	Iowa	0
August 3 – Game 8 (F/4)	Wisconsin	1
Iowa	16	Iowa	2
Kansas	4

=== Mountain ===
The tournament took place in San Bernardino, California from August 2–8.

State	City	LL Organization	Record
Colorado	Boulder	North Boulder	0–2
Montana	Billings	Boulder Arrowhead	1–2
Nevada	Las Vegas	Summerlin South	3–0
Utah	Alpine	Lone Peak	2–2
Wyoming	Torrington	Torrington	2–2

Upper round 1
August 2 – Game 1
Montana	4
Wyoming	11
Lower round 1
August 4 – Game 4
Montana	8
Colorado	3

Upper round 2
August 3 – Game 3
Utah	10
Wyoming	6
August 3 – Game 2 (F/3)
Nevada	17
Colorado	0
Lower round 2
August 5 – Game 5
Wyoming	4
Montana	2

Upper final
August 5 – Game 6 (F/5)
Utah	12
Nevada	22
Lower final
August 7 – Game 7 (F/4)
Utah	10
Wyoming	0

Final
August 8 – Championship
Nevada	6
Utah	3

=== New England ===
The tournament took place in Bristol, Connecticut from August 2–7.

State	City	LL Organization	Record
Maine	Machias	Machias Area	0–2
Massachusetts	Braintree	Braintree American	3–0
New Hampshire	Bedford	Bedford	2–2
Vermont	Essex	Essex Town	1–2

August 2 – Game 1 (F/7)
Vermont	9
August 4 – Game 4 (F/5)
New Hampshire	8
Vermont	0
August 2 – Game 2 (F/3)
Massachusetts	10
Massachusetts	15
August 7 – Championship (F/8)
Maine	0
Massachusetts	3
New Hampshire	2
August 6 – Game 5
Vermont	2
August 3 – Game 3
New Hampshire	3
New Hampshire	11
Maine	3

=== Northwest ===
The tournament took place in San Bernardino, California from August 3–8.

State	City	LL Organization	Record
Alaska	Anchorage	Abbott-O-Rabbit	1–2
Idaho	Meridian	Southwest Ada	0–2
Oregon	Beaverton	Murrayhill	2–2
Washington	Bonney Lake	Bonney Lake/Sumner	3–0

August 3 – Game 1
Alaska	5
August 5 – Game 4 (F/5)
Washington	17
Washington	20
August 3 – Game 2 (F/5)
Oregon	6
Oregon	12
August 8 – Championship
Idaho	2
Washington	6
Oregon	1
August 6 – Game 5
Oregon	8
August 4 – Game 3
Alaska	2
Alaska	2
Idaho	0

=== Southeast ===
The tournament took place in Warner Robins, Georgia from July 31–August 6.

State	City	LL Organization	Record
Alabama	Phenix City	Phenix City Youth Baseball	1–2
Florida	Lake Mary	Lake Mary	3–1
Georgia	Cartersville	Cartersville	0–2
North Carolina	Huntersville	Lake Norman	2–2
South Carolina	Irmo	Irmo	4–1
Tennessee	Nolensville	Nolensville	0–2
Virginia	Front Royal	Front Royal	3–2
West Virginia	Shenandoah Junction	Jefferson County	1–2

Upper round 1	Upper round 2	Upper final	Final
July 31 – Game 1
Florida	2
August 1 – Game 7 (F/5)
Tennessee	1
Florida	10
July 31 – Game 2
West Virginia	0
North Carolina	9
August 3 – Game 12 (F/5)
West Virginia	10
Florida	14
July 31 – Game 3
South Carolina	0
South Carolina	5
August 1 – Game 8 (F/5)
Georgia	3
South Carolina	11
July 31 – Game 4 (F/5)
Alabama	1
Virginia	0	August 6 – Championship
Alabama	10	Florida	4
South Carolina	5
Lower round 1	Lower round 2	Lower round 3	Lower final
August 2 – Game 9
August 1 – Game 5	Alabama	2	August 5 – Game 13
Tennessee	1	North Carolina	3	August 5 – Game 11 (F/7)	South Carolina	4
North Carolina	7	North Carolina	2	Virginia	3
August 3 – Game 10	Virginia	3
August 1 – Game 6 (F/8)	West Virginia	1
Georgia	7	Virginia	2
Virginia	8

=== Southwest ===
The tournament took place in Waco, Texas from July 31–August 5.

State	City	LL Organization	Record
Arkansas	Little Rock	Junior Deputy Baseball	0–2
Louisiana	Kenner	Eastbank	3–1
Mississippi	Starkville	Starkville	1–2
New Mexico	Albuquerque	Eastdale	0–2
Oklahoma	Tulsa	Tulsa National	3–2
Texas East	Richmond	Lamar	3–1
Texas West	Hewitt	Midway	2–2

Upper round 1	Upper round 2	Upper final	Final
August 1 – Game 4
Texas East	8
July 31 – Game 1 (F/5)
Texas West	1
Texas West	10
August 3 – Game 10
New Mexico	0
Texas East	5
July 31 – Game 2
Louisiana	7
Oklahoma	2
August 1 – Game 5
Arkansas	1
Oklahoma	1
July 31 – Game 3
Louisiana	8
Mississippi	7
August 5 – Championship
Louisiana	8
Louisiana	2
Texas East	5
Lower round 1	Lower round 2	Lower round 3	Lower final
August 2 – Game 8
August 1 – Game 6	Texas West	1	August 4 – Game 11
Arkansas	1	Mississippi	0	August 3 – Game 9 (F/8)	Texas East	5
Mississippi	2	Texas West	9	Oklahoma	2
August 2 – Game 7	Oklahoma	12
New Mexico	1
Oklahoma	5

=== West ===
The tournament took place in San Bernardino, California from August 2–7.

State	City	LL Organization	Record
Arizona	Phoenix	Arcadia	0–2
Hawaii	Honolulu	Honolulu	3–0
Northern California	Menlo Park	Alpine/West Menlo	1–2
Southern California	Fullerton	Golden Hill	2–2

August 2 – Game 1
Northern California	5
August 4 – Game 4 (F/8)
Arizona	1
Northern California	3
August 2 – Game 2
Hawaii	4
Hawaii	1
August 7 – Championship
Southern California	0
Hawaii	4
Southern California	1
August 6 – Game 5
Northern California	0
August 4 – Game 3
Southern California	11
Arizona	3
Southern California	7

== International ==
=== Asia-Pacific ===
The tournament took place in Hwaseong, South Korea from June 27–July 3.

Pool A
Country	Record
South Korea	5–0
Chinese Taipei^{1}	4–1
China	3–2
Hong Kong	2–3
Guam	1–4
Saudi Arabia	0–5

Pool B
Country	Record
Philippines	4–1
Thailand	4–1
Northern Mariana Islands	4–1
Indonesia	2–3
American Samoa	1–4
New Zealand	0–5

^{1} Republic of China, commonly known as Taiwan, due to complicated relations with People's Republic of China, is recognized by the name Chinese Taipei by majority of international organizations including Little League Baseball (LLB). For more information, please see Cross-Strait relations.

==== Knockout round ====
Semi-finals
July 2 – Hwaseong
1B Philippines	0
2A Chinese Taipei	10
July 2 – Hwaseong
1A South Korea	16
2B Thailand	0

Asia-Pacific Championship
July 3 – Hwaseong
2A Chinese Taipei	2
1A South Korea	0

=== Australia ===
The tournament took place in Sydney from June 8–13.

==== Pool A ====
Pos	Team	Pld	W	L	RF	RA	RD	PCT	Qualification
1	(New South Wales) Ryde Red	5	4	1	55	9	+46	.800	Advance to semi-finals
2	(Queensland) Brisbane North	5	4	1	42	15	+27	.800	Advance to semi-finals
3	(New South Wales) Macarthur	5	4	1	49	20	+29	.800	
4	(Western Australia) Eastern Phantoms	5	2	3	35	34	+1	.400	
5	(Victoria (state)) Melbourne Rangers	5	1	4	25	55	−30	.200	
6	(Northern Territory) NT Buffaloes	5	0	5	8	81	−73	.000	

Source: 2025 Australia Region Tournament

==== Pool B ====
Pos	Team	Pld	W	L	RF	RA	RD	PCT	Qualification
1	(New South Wales) Manly Eagles	5	5	0	44	13	+31	1.000	Advance to semi-finals
2	(Queensland) Gold Coast	5	3	2	50	26	+24	.600	Advance to semi-finals
3	(Western Australia) Southern Titans	5	3	2	35	26	+9	.600	
4	(South Australia) Adelaide Marlins	5	3	2	39	35	+4	.600	
5	(Queensland) Melbourne Twins	5	1	4	18	43	−25	.200	
6	(Australian Capital Territory) Canberra Rangers	5	0	5	22	65	−43	.000	

Source: 2025 Australia Region Tournament

==== Bracket ====
Semi-finals
June 12 – Sydney
1A (New South Wales) Ryde Red	4
2B (Queensland) Gold Coast	1
June 12 – Sydney
1B (New South Wales) Manly Eagles	0
2A (Queensland) Brisbane North	5

Australia Championship
June 13 – Sydney
1A (New South Wales) Ryde Red	0
2A (Queensland) Brisbane North	6
Third place
June 13 – Sydney
2B (Queensland) Gold Coast	4
1B (New South Wales) Manly Eagles	6

=== Canada ===
The tournament took place in Victoria, British Columbia from July 29–August 7.

Province	City	LL Organization	Record
British Columbia (Host)	Victoria	Layritz	6–0
British Columbia	Vancouver	Little Mountain	5–1
Alberta	Calgary	Rocky Mountain	3–3
Quebec	Mirabel	Diamond Baseball	3–3
Nova Scotia	Sydney Mines	Sydney Mines and District	2–4
Ontario	Toronto	High Park	2–4
Saskatchewan	Moose Jaw	Moose Jaw	0–6

==== Bracket ====
Semi-finals
August 6 – Victoria
1 British Columbia (Host)	6
4 Quebec	5
August 6 – Victoria
2 British Columbia	10
3 Alberta	0

Canada Championship
August 7 – Victoria
1 British Columbia (Host)	0
2 British Columbia	8
Third place
August 7 – Victoria
4 Quebec	6
3 Alberta	7

=== Caribbean ===
The tournament took place in Willemstad, Curaçao from July 7–12.

Pool A
Country	City	LL Organization	Record
Dominican Republic	Santiago	Bravos de Pontezuela	2–1
Aruba	Santa Cruz	Aruba Center	2–1
Curaçao A	Willemstad	Pariba	2–1
Cuba	Havana	La Lisa	0–3

Pool B
Country	City	LL Organization	Record
Curaçao B	Willemstad	Pabao	3–0
US Virgin Islands	St. Thomas	Elrod Hendricks West	2–1
Bonaire	Kralendijk	Bonaire	1–2
Sint Maarten	Philipsburg	St. Maarten	0–3

Semi-finals
July 11 – Willemstad
1B Curaçao B	1
2A Aruba	2
July 11 – Willemstad
1A Dominican Republic	6
2B US Virgin Islands	0

Caribbean Championship
July 12 – Willemstad (F/7)
2A Aruba	9
1A Dominican Republic	7

=== Europe and Africa ===
The tournament took place in Kutno, Poland from July 20–26.

==== Qualifier tournament ====
Teams
Country	City	LL Organization	Record
Croatia	Sisak	Croatia North	4–0
Slovakia	Bratislava	Slovakia West	3–1
Belgium	Antwerp	Belgium Region 3	3–1
Romania	Călărași	CSS Calarasi	2–2
Poland	Kutno	Stal Kutno	1–3
Switzerland	Zurich	Switzerland East	1–3
Ukraine	Kyiv	Kyiv	0–4

First Place
July 16 – Kutno (F/4)
1 Croatia	13
4 Romania	0

Second Place
July 16 – Kutno
2 Slovakia	2
3 Belgium	5

==== Regional tournament ====
Pool A
Country	City	LL Organization	Record
Spain	Madrid	Madrid	5–0
Netherlands	Rotterdam	Rotterdam	4–1
France	Paris	Ile-De-France	3–2
Croatia	Sisak	Croatia North	2–3
United Kingdom	London	London	1–4
Lithuania	Vilnius	Vilnius	0–5

Pool B
Country	City	LL Organization	Record
Czechia	Brno	South Czech Republic	5–0
Germany	Mannheim	South-West Germany	4–1
Italy	Florence	Toscana	3–2
Ukraine	Kyiv	Kyiv Baseball School	2–3
Belgium	Antwerp	Belgium Region 3	1–4
Israel	Beit Shemesh	South	0–5

Semi-finals
July 25 – Kutno (F/4)
1A Spain	12
2B Germany	2
July 25 – Kutno
1B (Czech Republic) Czechia	2
2A Netherlands	1

Europe-Africa Championship
July 26 – Kutno
1A Spain	2
1B (Czech Republic) Czechia	3

=== Japan ===
The tournament took place in Tokyo from July 19–20.

Pool A
Team	Prefecture	City	LL Organization	Record
Tokyo; Champions	Tokyo	Tokyo	Joto	2–0
Shin'etsu; Champions	Niigata	Niigata	Niigata	1–1
Kansai; Champions	Hyogo	Takarazuka	Hyogo	0–2

Pool C
Team	Prefecture	City	LL Organization	Record
Kanagawa; Champions	Kanagawa	Yokohama	Yokohama	1–1
Chūgoku; Champions	Hiroshima	Hiroshima	Sanyo	1–1
Kyushu; Champions	Fukuoka	Kitakyushu	Kyushu Hokubu	1–1

Pool B
Team	Prefecture	City	LL Organization	Record
Tōhoku; Champions	Miyagi	Miyagi	Miyagi	2–0
Tōkai; Champions	Shizuoka	Hamamatsu	Shizuoka	1–1
Kitakanto; Champions	Saitama	Koshigaya	Saitama Higashi	0–2

Pool D
Team	Prefecture	City	LL Organization	Record
Higashikanto; Champions	Chiba	Chiba	Chiba	2–0
Tokyo; Runner-Up	Tokyo	Tokyo	Saito	1–1
Shikoku; Champions	Ehime	Iyo	Ehime Chuo	0–2

Semi-finals
July 20 – Tokyo
1A (Tokyo) Joto	3
1B (Miyagi Prefecture) Miyagi	1
July 20 – Tokyo
1C (Kanagawa Prefecture) Yokohama	2
1D (Chiba Prefecture) Chiba	1

Japan Championship
July 20 – Tokyo (F/5)
1A (Tokyo) Joto	15
1C (Kanagawa Prefecture) Yokohama	4

=== Latin America ===
The tournament took place in Guayaquil, Ecuador from July 13–19.

Pool A
Country	LL Organization	Record
Brazil	Sul	3–1
Guatemala	Javier	2–2
Ecuador 2	Lbes	2–2
Honduras	Marinera	2–2
Chile	Santiago Oriente	1–3

Pool B
Country	LL Organization	Record
Venezuela	Cardenales	3–0
Ecuador 1	Especializada de Beisbol	2–1
Costa Rica	Santo Domingo Heredia	1–2
Argentina	Salta Argentina	0–3

Semi-finals
July 18 – Guayaquil
1A Brazil	1
2B Ecuador 1	3
July 18 – Guayaquil
1B Venezuela	10
2A Guatemala	0

Latin America Championship
July 19 – Guayaquil
2B Ecuador 1	0
1B Venezuela	2
Third place
July 19 – Guayaquil
1A Brazil	3
2A Guatemala	2

=== Mexico ===
The tournament took place in Guaymas, Sonora from July 8–22.

Pool A
State	City	LL Organization	Record
Nuevo León	Guadalupe	Guadalupe Linda Vista	4–1
Tamaulipas	Matamoros	Matamoros	3–2
Sonora	Guaymas	Sector Pesca	3–2
Nayarit	Tepic	Kora	3–2
Coahuila	Monclova	Ribereña	2–3
Chihuahua	Parral	San Uriel	0–5

Pool B
State	City	LL Organization	Record
Chihuahua	Chihuahua	El Swing Perfecto	5–1
Aguascalientes	Aguascalientes	Tepezala	3–3
Nuevo León	Apodaca	Bravos	4–2
Tamaulipas	Matamoros	Villa del Refugio	3–3
Veracruz	Cardel	Cardel	3–3
Baja California	Tijuana	Municipal de Tijuana	2–4
Durango	Gómez Palacio	Halcones de Vergel	1–5

Semi-finals
July 21 – Guaymas
1A (Tamaulipas) Matamoros	3
2B Aguascalientes	0
July 21 – Guaymas
1B (Chihuahua (state)) El Swing Perfecto	2
2A (Sonora) Sector Pesca	0

Mexico Championship
July 22 – Guaymas
1A (Tamaulipas) Matamoros	1
1B (Chihuahua (state)) El Swing Perfecto	4

=== Panama ===
As part of a rotational schedule also involving Cuba and Puerto Rico, the winner of the Panama Region gained direct entry into the tournament in 2025. The tournament took place in Panama City from February 15–27.

==== First Round ====
Pool A
Province	City	LL Organization	Record
Panamá Oeste	Arraiján	Vacamonte	4–1
Herrera	Chitré	Activo 20-30	4–1
Los Santos	Las Tablas	Las Tablas	3–2
Panamá Este	Pacora	Pacora	2–3
Veraguas	Santiago de Veraguas	Activo 20-30	2–3
Chiriquí	Bugaba	Bugaba	0–5

Pool B
Province	City	LL Organization	Record
Coclé	Aguadulce	Aguadulce	4–0
Colón	Cristóbal	Cristóbal	4–1
Panamá Metro	Juan Díaz	Juan Díaz	3–1
Chiriquí Occídente	Puerto Armuelles	Baru	1–3
Darién	Metetí	Meteti	1–3
Bocas del Toro	Almirante	Almirante	0–5

==== Final 6 ====
Province	City	LL Organization	Record
Panamá Oeste	Arraiján	Vacamonte	4–1
Coclé	Aguadulce	Aguadulce	4–1
Herrera	Chitré	Activo 20-30	3–2
Panamá Metro	Juan Díaz	Juan Díaz	2–3
Los Santos	Las Tablas	Las Tablas	2–3
Colón	Cristóbal	Cristóbal	0–5

Panama Championship
February 27 – Panama City
1 Panamá Oeste	4
2 Coclé	0

=== Puerto Rico ===
As part of a rotational schedule also involving Cuba and Panama, the winner of the Puerto Rico Region will gain direct entry into the tournament in 2025. The tournament took place in Sabana Grande, Puerto Rico from May 31–June 29.

City	LL Organization	Record
Arroyo	Hermanos Cruz	5–2
Barbosa	Academia Castro Sports	3–2
Cabo Rojo	Natalio Irizarry	1–2
Caguas	Liga Criolla RA 12	3–2
Carolina A	Castellana Gardens A	1–2
Carolina B	Castellana Gardens B	0–2
Guayama	Radamaes López	1–2
Mayagüez	Wilfredo Brea Ramirez	2–2
Sabana Grande	Gino Vega	0–2
Vega Baja	Jaime Collazo	2–2
Venezuela	Piratas de Venezuela	0–2
Yabucoa	Juan A. Bibiloni	4–0

Upper round 1	Upper round 2	Upper round 3	Upper final	Final
June 1 – Game 5
May 31 – Game 1	Barbosa	7
June 8 – Game 15
Barbosa	3	Cabo Rojo	5
Barbosa	4
Vega Baja	0	June 1 – Game 6
Arroyo	1
May 31 – Game 2	Arroyo	16
June 22 – Game 19
Arroyo	17	Carolina B	0
Barbosa	0
Carolina A	3	June 1 – Game 7
Yabucoa	8
May 31 – Game 3	Caguas	10
June 14 – Game 16
Venezuela	2	Sabana Grande	1
Caguas	4
Caguas	15	June 1 – Game 8
Yabucoa	20
May 31 – Game 4	Guayama	2
Mayaguez	11	Yabucoa	7	June 29 – Game 22 Championship
Guayama	12	Yabucoa	11
Arroyo	1
Lower round 1	Lower round 2	Lower round 3	Lower round 4	Lower final
June 7 – Game 9
June 21 – Game 18
Venezuela	2
June 8 – Game 13	Caguas	12
Cabo Rojo	3
Cabo Rojo	5	Mayaguez	2	June 28 – Game 21
June 7 – Game 10
Mayaguez	12	June 22 – Game 20	Barbosa	1
Mayaguez	5
Caguas	2	Arroyo	9
Carolina B	3
Arroyo	3
June 7 – Game 11
June 21 – Game 17
Vega Baja	10
June 14 – Game 14	Arroyo	6
Sabana Grande	0
Vega Baja	5	Vega Baja	4
June 7 – Game 12
Carolina A	2
Carolina A	5
Guayama	0
