= El Chorrillo =

Coordinates: 8.9494°N 79.5456°W

- Corregimiento
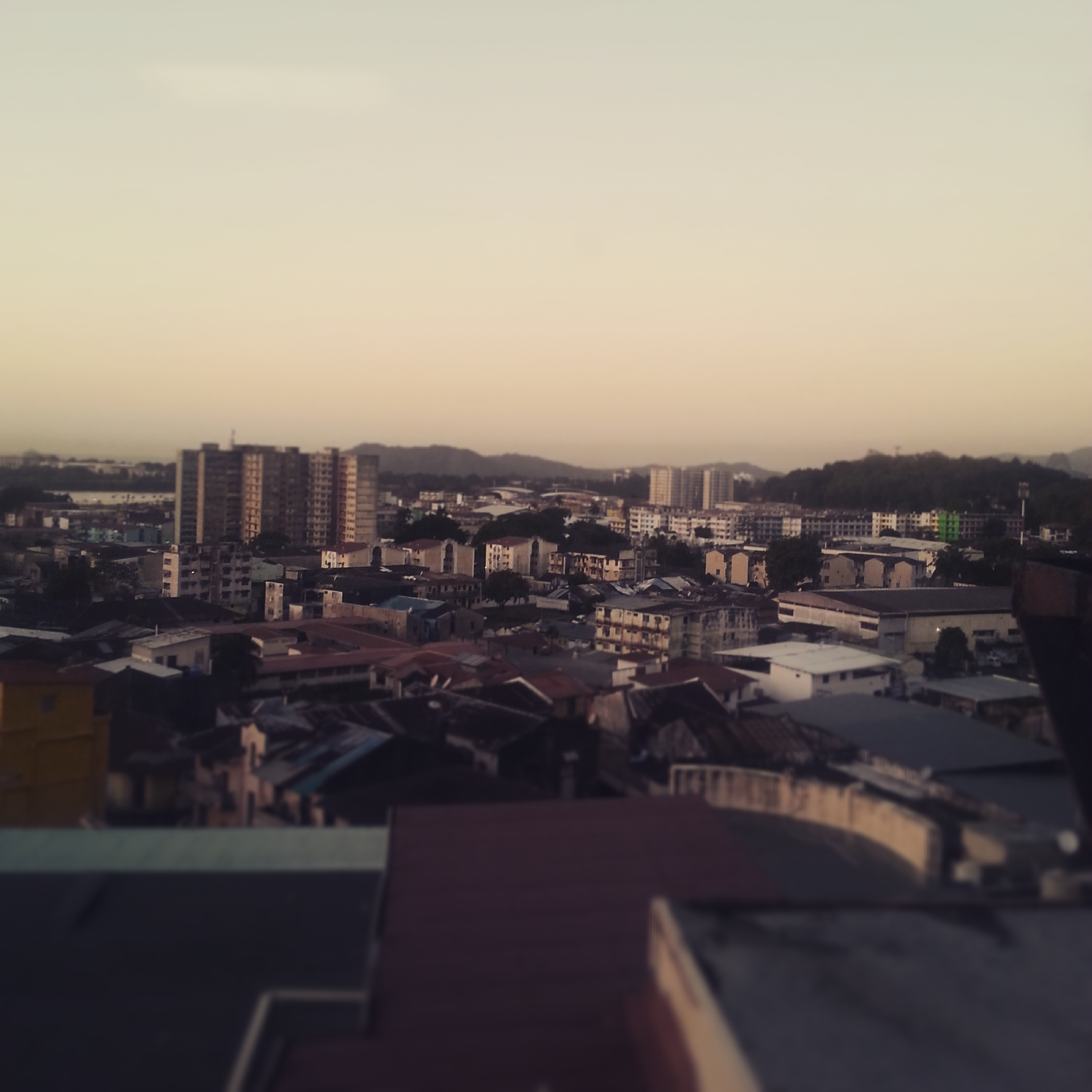
- View of El Chorrillo from Santa Ana

- Location within Panama
- Country: Panama
- Province: Panamá
- District: Panamá

Area
  - Land: 0.6 km^{2} (0.23 sq mi)

Population (2010)
  - Total: 18,302
  - Density: 29,363.1/km^{2} (76,050/sq mi)
- Population density calculated based on land area.
- Time zone: UTC−5 (EST)

El Chorrillo is a corregimiento within Panama City, in Panamá District, Panamá Province, Panama with a population of 18,302 as of 2010.

== History ==
It was founded April 29, 1915, and was originally populated by immigrants working on the construction of the Panama Canal; many were from the Antilles. The impoverished area is the hometown of Manuel Noriega and was heavily damaged during the United States invasion of Panama in 1989. Other former residents of note include boxer Roberto Durán and poet Hector Miguel Collado.

Its population as of 1990 was 20,488; its population as of 2000 was 22,632.

== Sport ==
El Chorillo is the only district in Panama with two first-division clubs - Chorrillo F.C. and Plaza Amador - in the Liga Panameña de Fútbol.

El Chorillo is the birthplace of hall of fame boxer Roberto Duran.
