= Panamá District =

Panamá
- District

- Location of the district capital in Panama
- Coordinates: 8°59′N 79°31′W
- Country: Panama
- Province: Panamá
- Capital: Panama City

Area
  - Total: 2,031 km^{2} (784 sq mi)

Population (2019)
  - Total: 1,183,333
  - Density: 582.6/km^{2} (1,509/sq mi)
- official estimate
- Time zone: UTC-5 (ETZ)

Panamá is a district (distrito) of Panamá Province in Panama. The population according to the 2010 census was 880,691; the latest official estimate (for 2019) is 1,183,333. The district covers a total area of 2,031 km^{2}. The district seat is Panama City.

== Administrative divisions ==
Panamá District is divided administratively into the following corregimientos:

- 24 de Diciembre
- Ancón
- Bella Vista
- Betania
- Calidonia
- Chilibre
- Curundú
- El Chorrillo
- Juan Díaz
- Las Cumbres
- Las Mañanitas
- Pacora

- Parque Lefevre
- Pedregal
- Pueblo Nuevo
- Río Abajo
- San Felipe
- San Francisco
- San Martín
- Santa Ana
- Tocumen
- Alcalde Díaz
- Ernesto Córdoba Campos
- Caimitillo
