= Chilibre =

- Corregimiento
- Location within Panama
- Coordinates: 9°9′0″N 79°37′12″W
- Country: Panama
- Province: Panamá
- District: Panamá

Area
  - Land: 924 km^{2} (357 sq mi)

Population (2010)
  - Total: 53,955
  - Density: 58.4/km^{2} (151/sq mi)
- Population density calculated based on land area.
- Time zone: UTC−5 (EST)

Chilibre is a town and corregimiento in Panamá District, Panamá Province, Panama with a population of 53,955 as of 2010. Its population as of 1990 was 27,135; its population as of 2000 was 40,475.

== Climate ==
Chilibre has a tropical monsoon climate (Köppen: Am).

Climate data for Chilibre
Month	Jan	Feb	Mar	Apr	May	Jun	Jul	Aug	Sep	Oct	Nov	Dec	Year
Mean daily maximum °C (°F)	29.1 (84.4)	29.4 (84.9)	29.9 (85.8)	30.2 (86.4)	29.7 (85.5)	29.4 (84.9)	29.4 (84.9)	29.4 (84.9)	29.3 (84.7)	28.9 (84.0)	28.6 (83.5)	29.1 (84.4)	29.4 (84.9)
Daily mean °C (°F)	25.4 (77.7)	25.6 (78.1)	25.9 (78.6)	26.3 (79.3)	26.2 (79.2)	26.0 (78.8)	25.9 (78.6)	25.8 (78.4)	25.6 (78.1)	25.4 (77.7)	25.2 (77.4)	25.5 (77.9)	25.7 (78.3)
Mean daily minimum °C (°F)	22.7 (72.9)	22.7 (72.9)	23.0 (73.4)	23.5 (74.3)	23.8 (74.8)	23.7 (74.7)	23.7 (74.7)	23.6 (74.5)	23.4 (74.1)	23.3 (73.9)	23.1 (73.6)	23.1 (73.6)	23.3 (74.0)
Average precipitation mm (inches)	48.2 (1.90)	34.1 (1.34)	42.8 (1.69)	136.4 (5.37)	317.6 (12.50)	353.0 (13.90)	380.1 (14.96)	378.3 (14.89)	359.4 (14.15)	361.4 (14.23)	347.8 (13.69)	142.4 (5.61)	2,901.5 (114.23)
Source: Weather.Directory
