= Ernesto Córdoba Campos =

- Corregimiento
- Location within Panama
- Country: Panama
- Province: Panamá
- District: Panamá
- Established: July 10, 2009

Area
  - Land: 30.5 km^{2} (11.8 sq mi)

Population (2010)
  - Total: 55,784
  - Density: 1,826/km^{2} (4,730/sq mi)
- Population density calculated based on land area.
- Time zone: UTC−5 (EST)

Ernesto Córdoba Campos is a corregimiento in Panamá District, Panamá Province, Panama with a population of 55,784 as of 2010. It was created by Law 42 of July 10, 2009.
