= Tocumen =

- Corregimiento
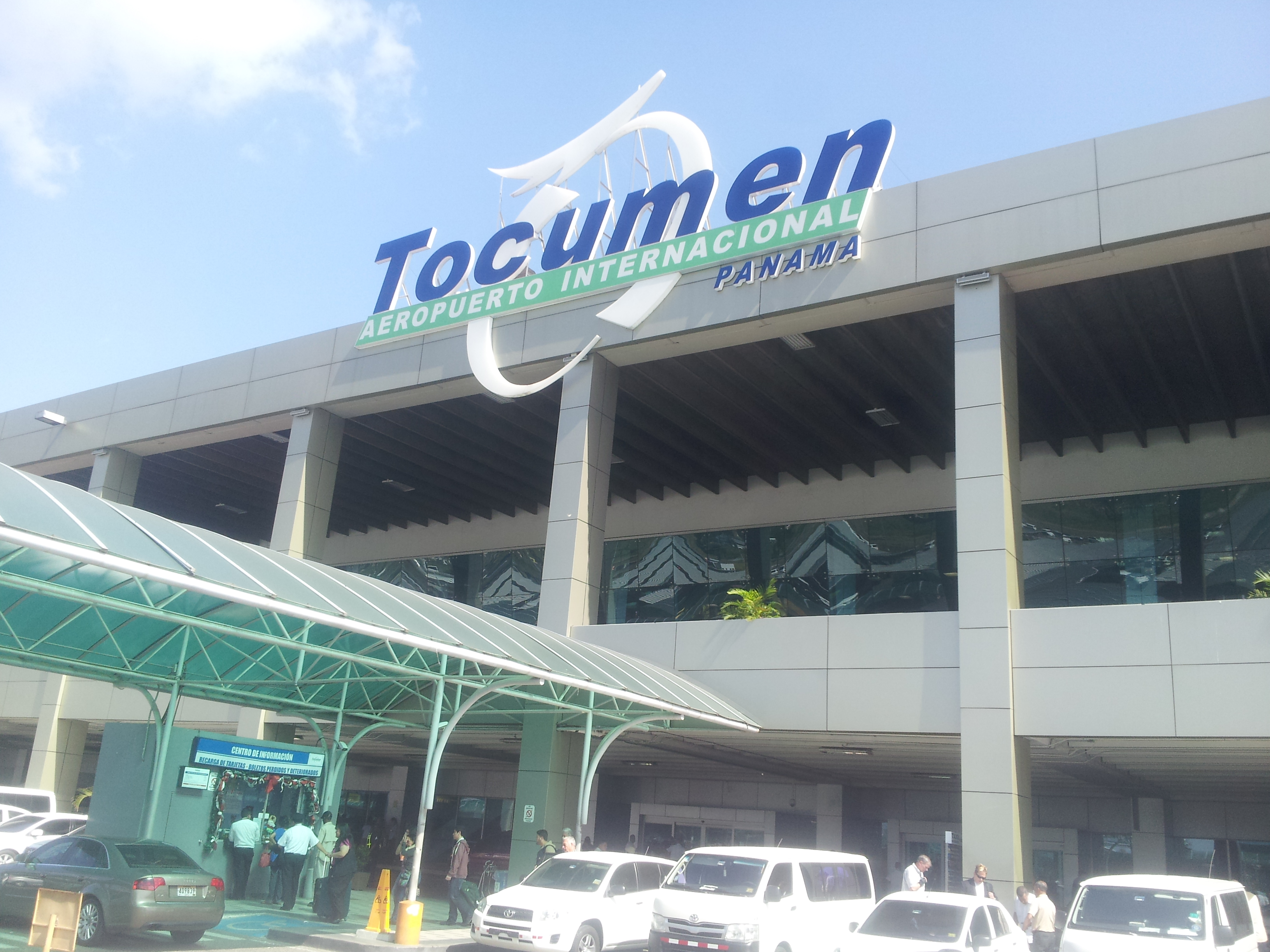
- Tocumen International Airport

- Location within Panama
- Coordinates: 9°4′48″N 79°22′48″W
- Country: Panama
- Province: Panamá
- District: Panamá

Area
  - Land: 63.9 km^{2} (24.7 sq mi)

Population (2010)
  - Total: 74,952
  - Density: 1,173.9/km^{2} (3,040/sq mi)
- Population density calculated based on land area.
- Time zone: UTC−5 (EST)

Tocumen is a city and corregimiento in Panamá District, Panamá Province, Panama with a population of 74,952 as of 2010. Its population as of 1990 was 47,032; its population as of 2000 was 83,187. It is the site of the Tocumen International Airport.

== Climate ==
According to the Köppen Climate Classification system, Tocumen has a tropical savanna climate, abbreviated Aw on climate maps.

Climate data for Tocumen
Month	Jan	Feb	Mar	Apr	May	Jun	Jul	Aug	Sep	Oct	Nov	Dec	Year
Mean daily maximum °C (°F)	36.0 (96.8)	36.6 (97.9)	37.0 (98.6)	37.6 (99.7)	38.0 (100.4)	38.0 (100.4)	36.0 (96.8)	38.0 (100.4)	35.4 (95.7)	35.2 (95.4)	35.0 (95.0)	35.5 (95.9)	36.5 (97.8)
Daily mean °C (°F)	26.6 (79.9)	27.0 (80.6)	27.5 (81.5)	27.8 (82.0)	27.4 (81.3)	27.0 (80.6)	27.0 (80.6)	27.0 (80.6)	26.7 (80.1)	26.4 (79.5)	26.5 (79.7)	26.6 (79.9)	27.0 (80.5)
Mean daily minimum °C (°F)	16.5 (61.7)	16.0 (60.8)	16.0 (60.8)	15.8 (60.4)	19.0 (66.2)	19.5 (67.1)	19.7 (67.5)	17.5 (63.5)	20.0 (68.0)	17.8 (64.0)	18.5 (65.3)	17.0 (62.6)	17.8 (64.0)
Average rainfall mm (inches)	26.4 (1.04)	10.0 (0.39)	15.2 (0.60)	69.6 (2.74)	231.6 (9.12)	234.7 (9.24)	172.4 (6.79)	218.0 (8.58)	246.8 (9.72)	326.3 (12.85)	240.9 (9.48)	100.6 (3.96)	1,892.5 (74.51)
Average relative humidity (%)	69.6	66.1	64.9	67.7	78.2	80.6	79.6	80.3	81.2	82.4	81.9	75.3	75.6
Mean monthly sunshine hours	211.9	203.7	211.2	179.6	127.5	97.4	110.5	111.9	113.2	114.3	126.6	171.3	1,779.1
