= San Martín, Panama =

Coordinates: 9.2000°N 79.2500°W

San Martín
- Corregimiento
- Location within Panama
- Country: Panama
- Province: Panamá
- District: Panamá

Area
  - Land: 131.5 km^{2} (50.8 sq mi)

Population (2010)
  - Total: 4,410
  - Density: 33.5/km^{2} (87/sq mi)
- Population density calculated based on land area.
- Time zone: UTC−5 (EST)

San Martín is a corregimiento in Panamá District, Panamá Province, Panama with a population of 4,410 as of 2010. Its population as of 1990 was 2,479; its population as of 2000 was 3,575.
