= Pedregal, Panamá District =

Coordinates: 9.0747°N 79.4311°W

Pedregal
- Corregimiento
- Location within Panama
- Country: Panama
- Province: Panamá
- District: Panamá

Area
  - Land: 28.3 km^{2} (10.9 sq mi)

Population (2010)
  - Total: 51,641
  - Density: 1,827.7/km^{2} (4,734/sq mi)
- Population density calculated based on land area.
- Time zone: UTC−5 (EST)

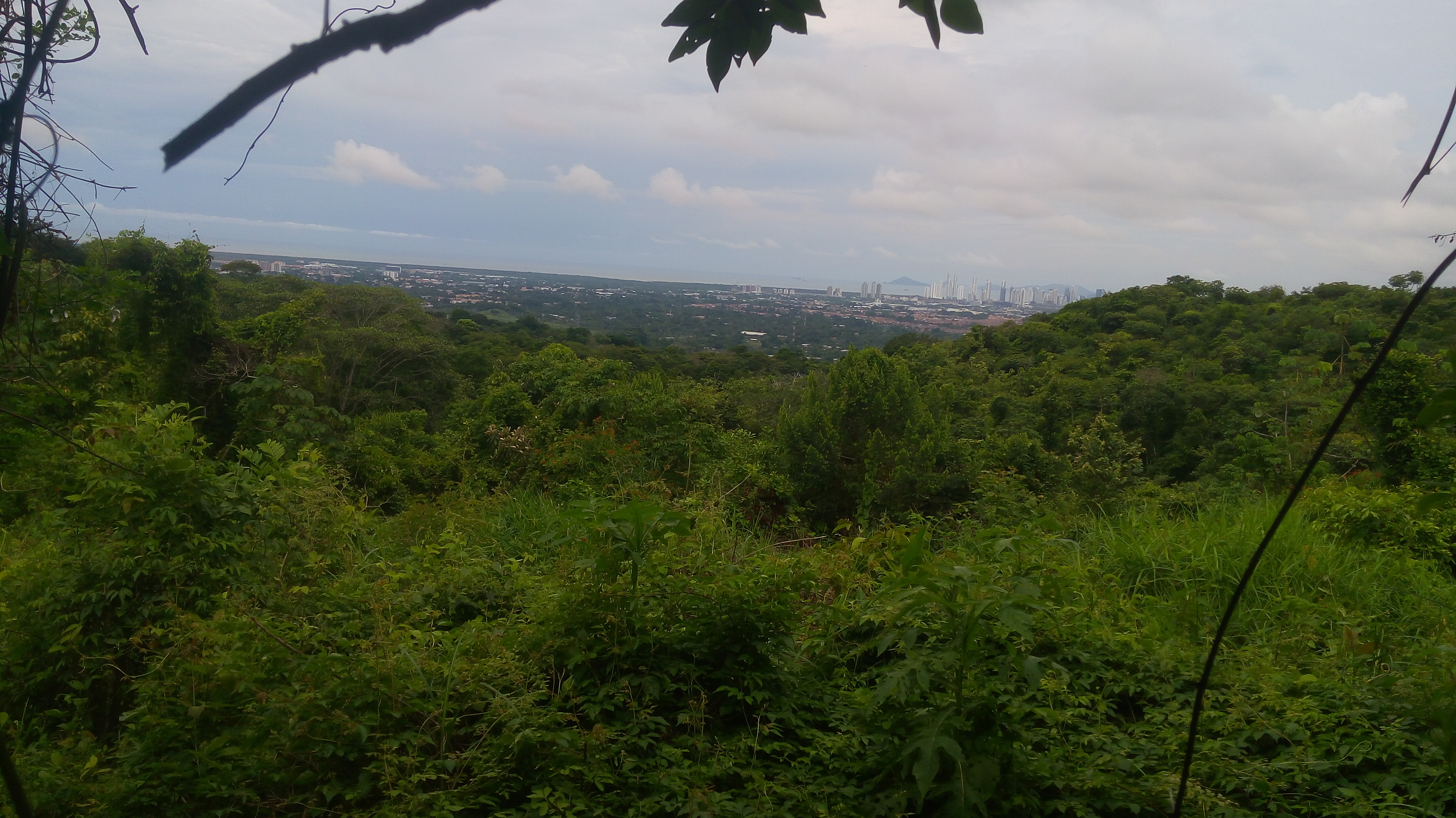
View of Panama City from the Altos of Pedregal

Pedregal is a corregimiento within Panama City, in Panamá District, Panamá Province, Panama with a population of 51,641 as of 2010. Its population as of 1990 was 40,896; its population as of 2000 was 45,801.
