= Parque Lefevre =

Coordinates: 9.0136°N 79.4844°W

- Corregimiento
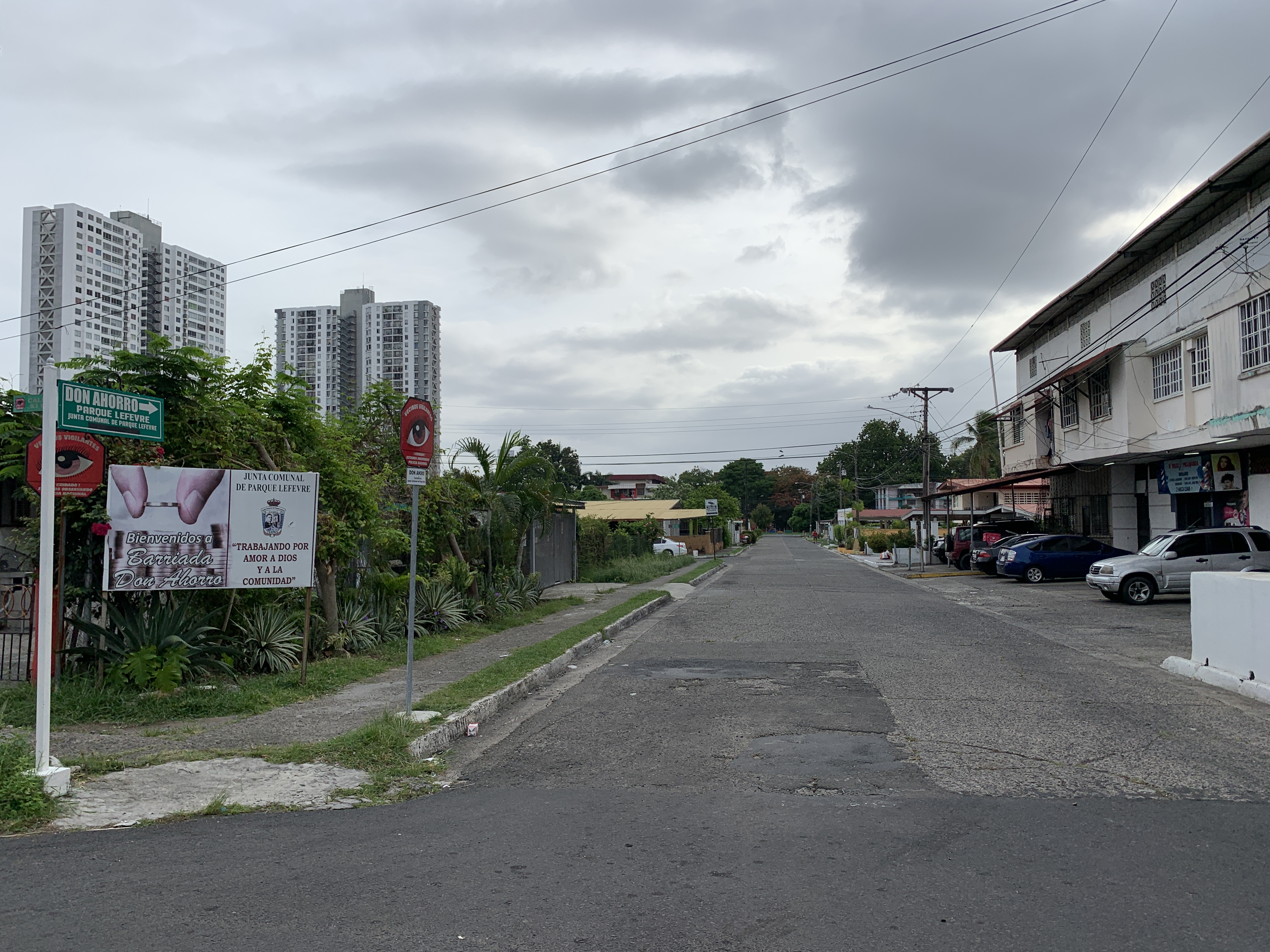

- Location within Panama
- Country: Panama
- Province: Panamá
- District: Panamá

Area
  - Land: 6.8 km^{2} (2.6 sq mi)

Population (2010)
  - Total: 36,997
  - Density: 5,408/km^{2} (14,010/sq mi)
- Population density calculated based on land area.
- Time zone: UTC−5 (EST)

Parque Lefevre is a corregimiento within Panama City, in Panamá District, Panamá Province, Panama with a population of 36,997 as of 2010. Its population as of 1990 was 38,163; its population as of 2000 was 37,136.
