= 24 de Diciembre =

- Corregimiento
- Location within Panama
- Coordinates: 9.1017°N 79.3603°W
- Country: Panama
- Province: Panamá
- District: Panamá
- Established: February 6, 2002

Area
  - Land: 78.9 km^{2} (30.5 sq mi)

Population (2010)
  - Total: 65,404
  - Density: 829/km^{2} (2,150/sq mi)
- Population density calculated based on land area.
- Time zone: UTC−5 (EST)

24 de Diciembre is a corregimiento in Panamá District, Panamá Province, Panama with a population of 65,404 as of 2010. It was created by Law 13 of February 6, 2002.
