= San Francisco, Panamá =

Coordinates: 8.9919°N 79.5069°W

San Francisco
- Corregimiento
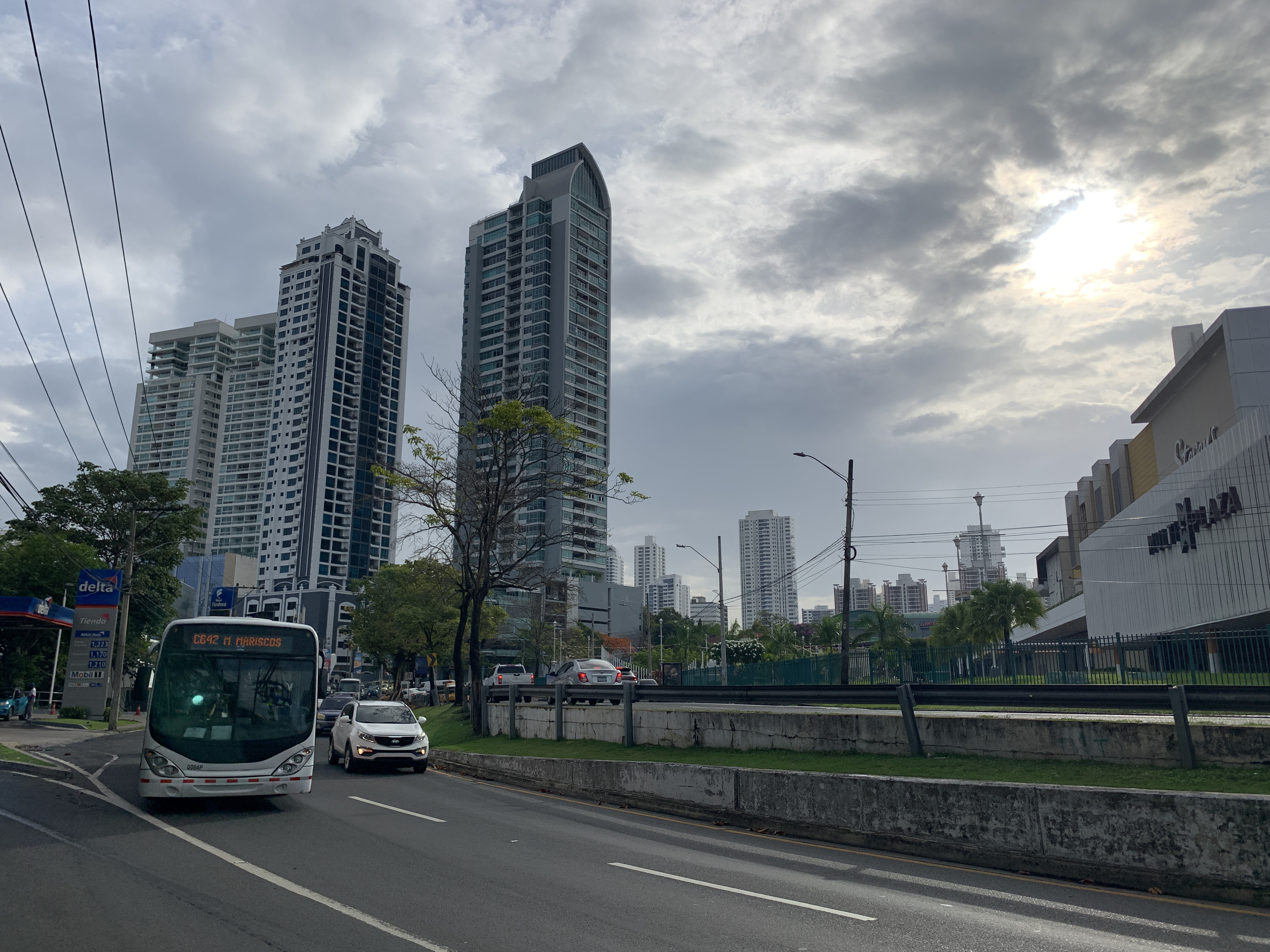

- Location within Panama
- Country: Panama
- Province: Panamá
- District: Panamá

Area
  - Land: 6.4 km^{2} (2.5 sq mi)

Population (2010)
  - Total: 43,939
  - Density: 6,855.7/km^{2} (17,756/sq mi)
- Population density calculated based on land area.
- Time zone: UTC−5 (EST)

San Francisco is a corregimiento within Panama City, in Panamá District, Panamá Province, Panama with a population of 43,939 as of 2010. Its population as of 1990 was 34,262, and its population as of 2000 was 35,751.

On 20 March 1998, San Francisco recorded a temperature of 40.0 °C (104.0 °F), which is the highest temperature to have ever been recorded in Panama.

== Notable people ==
- Noris Salazar Allen (born 1947), bryologist
