= San Felipe, Panama =

Coordinates: 8.9531°N 79.5358°W

San Felipe
- Corregimiento
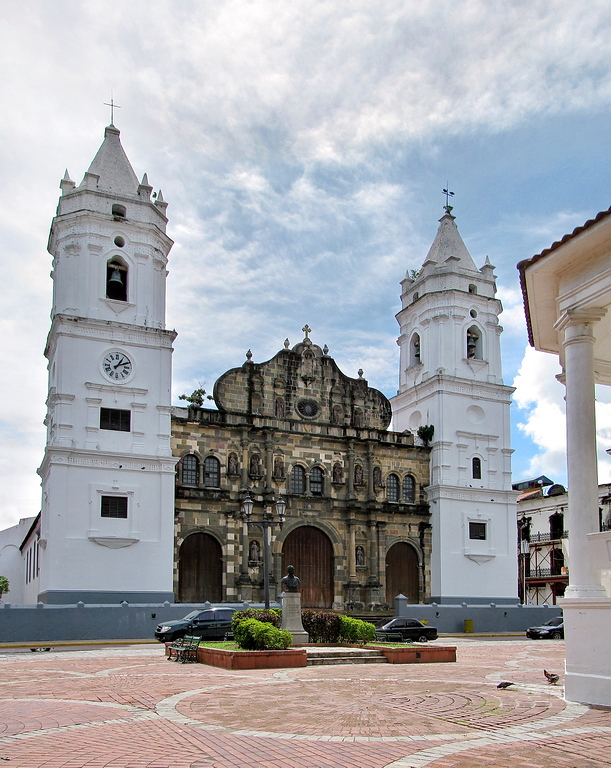
- Metropolitan Cathedral

- Location within Panama
- Country: Panama
- Province: Panamá
- District: Panamá

Area
  - Land: 0.3 km^{2} (0.12 sq mi)

Population (2010)
  - Total: 3,262
  - Density: 11,005.4/km^{2} (28,504/sq mi)
- Population density calculated based on land area.
- Time zone: UTC−5 (EST)

San Felipe is a corregimiento within Panama City, in Panamá District, Panamá Province, Panama with a population of 3,262 as of 2010. Its population as of 1990 was 10,282; its population as of 2000 was 6,928.
