= Las Mañanitas, Panama =

Coordinates: 9.0833°N 79.4000°W

Las Mañanitas
- Corregimiento
- Location within Panama
- Country: Panama
- Province: Panamá
- District: Panamá
- Established: February 6, 2002

Area
  - Land: 24.7 km^{2} (9.5 sq mi)

Population (2010)
  - Total: 39,473
  - Density: 1,599.6/km^{2} (4,143/sq mi)
- Population density calculated based on land area.
- Time zone: UTC−5 (EST)

Las Mañanitas is a corregimiento in Panamá District, Panamá Province, Panama with a population of 39,473 as of 2010. It was created by Law 13 of February 6, 2002.
