= Curundú =

Coordinates: 8.9867°N 79.5364°W

- Corregimiento
- Location within Panama
- Country: Panama
- Province: Panamá
- District: Panamá

Area
  - Land: 1.1 km^{2} (0.42 sq mi)

Population (2010)
  - Total: 16,361
  - Density: 14,466/km^{2} (37,470/sq mi)
- Population density calculated based on land area.
- Time zone: UTC−5 (EST)

Curundú is a corregimiento within Panama City, in Panamá District, Panamá Province, Panama with a population of 16,361 as of 2010. Its population as of 1990 was 17,933; its population as of 2000 was 19,019.

It was also home to the Curundú Bowling alley, the largest bowling alley in the canal zone, and the Pacific Arts Repertory Theater, a.k.a. "PRAT" a theater which along with the Theater Guild of Ancon was one of the primary venues for community theater in the Canal Zone.

== Education ==
During the time of the Panama Canal Zone, the Department of Defense Education Activity (DoDEA) formerly operated Curundu Elementary School and Curundu Middle School for children of American military dependents. The DoDEA high school in Panama was Balboa High School.

Curundu Junior High School, initially part of the Canal Zone school system, was later taken over by the Department of Defense Dependent Schools, which later became a part of the DoDEA. It was used for the 7th and 8th grades of both students from the Canal Zone and dependents of US Military personnel stationed there. The school had an iconic geodesic dome cafeteria and the school mascot was the Cougar.
