= Pueblo Nuevo, Panama =

Coordinates: 9.0122°N 79.5147°W

Pueblo Nuevo
- Corregimiento
- Location within Panama
- Country: Panama
- Province: Panamá
- District: Panamá

Area
  - Land: 2.9 km^{2} (1.1 sq mi)

Population (2010)
  - Total: 18,984
  - Density: 6,625.9/km^{2} (17,161/sq mi)
- Population density calculated based on land area.
- Time zone: UTC−5 (EST)

Pueblo Nuevo is a corregimiento within Panama City, in Panamá District, Panamá Province, Panama with a population of 18,984 as of 2010. Its population as of 1990 was 21,289; its population as of 2000 was 18,161.
