= Alcalde Díaz =

- Corregimiento
- Location within Panama
- Coordinates: 9°7′12″N 79°33′0″W
- Country: Panama
- Province: Panamá
- District: Panamá
- Established: July 10, 2009

Area
  - Land: 46 km^{2} (18 sq mi)

Population (2010)
  - Total: 41,292
  - Density: 897.3/km^{2} (2,324/sq mi)
- Population density calculated based on land area.
- Time zone: UTC−5 (EST)

Alcalde Díaz is a town and corregimiento in Panamá District, Panamá Province, Panama with a population of 41,292 as of 2010. It was created by Law 42 of July 10, 2009.

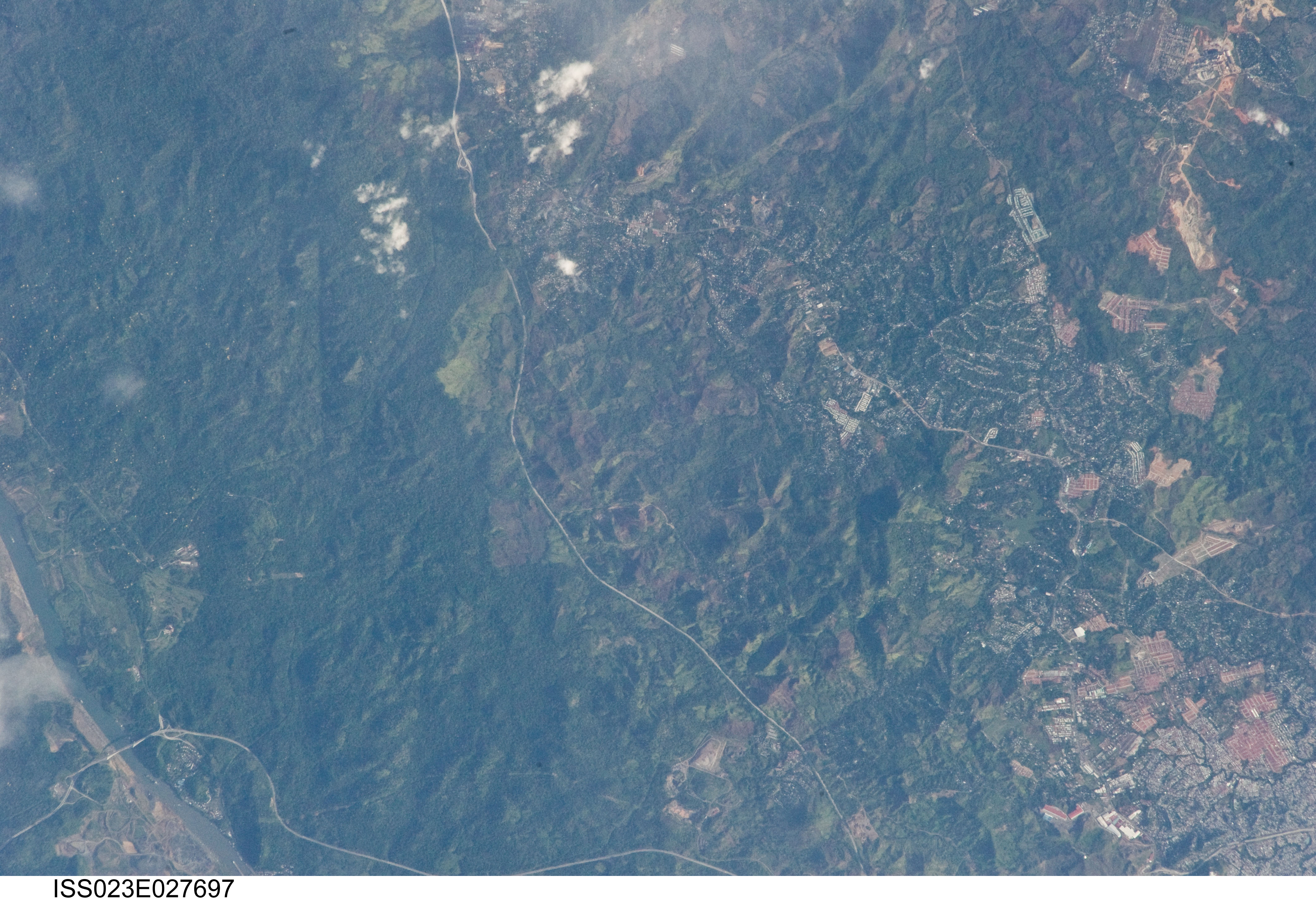
Alcalde Diaz, roads, forests
