= Las Cumbres =

- Corregimiento
- Location within Panama
- Coordinates: 9°05′N 79°33′W
- Country: Panama
- Province: Panamá
- District: Panamá

Area
  - Land: 27.8 km^{2} (10.7 sq mi)

Population (2010)
  - Total: 32,867
  - Density: 1,180.3/km^{2} (3,057/sq mi)
- Population density calculated based on land area.
- Time zone: UTC−5 (EST)

Las Cumbres is a corregimiento in Panamá District, Panamá Province, Panama, with a population of 32,867 as of 2010. Its population as of 1990 was 56,547; its population as of 2000 was 92,519. Neighborhoods in this sector include Villa Campestre, El Lago, Las Cumbrecitas, Las Glorietas, San Andrés, Altavista, El Rocio, Las Lajas, Gonzalillo, Villa Grecia, and Colonial Las Cumbres. Las Cumbres is a rural community north of Panama City, developed by businessman Louis Martinz in the 1950s. It is at an average altitude of 1,050 feet (320 m), giving the neighborhood a more temperate, cooler environment. Two lakes were constructed for recreation and selective water supply. The neighborhood evolved with middle-class families, to include many prominent members of Panamanian society such as scientists, doctors, engineers, businesspersons, and politicians. The community has been encroached upon by poverty-stricken neighborhoods, losing some of the charm. The Las Cumbres community still maintains much of its original charm and attractions.
