= Betania, Panama =

Coordinates: 9.0147°N 79.5294°W

Betania
- Corregimiento
- Interactive map of Betania
- Location within Panama
- Country: Panama
- Province: Panamá
- District: Panamá

Area
  - Land: 8.3 km^{2} (3.2 sq mi)

Population (2010)
  - Total: 46,116
  - Density: 5,559.4/km^{2} (14,399/sq mi)
- Population density calculated based on land area.
- Time zone: UTC−5 (EST)

Betania is a corregimiento within Panama City, in Panamá District, Panamá Province, Panama with a population of 46,116 as of 2010. Its population was 46,611 in 1990 and 44,409 in 2000.
