= Caimitillo =

- Location within Panama
- Coordinates: 9°9′0″N 79°31′48″W
- Country: Panama
- Province: Panamá

Population (2008)
  - Total: 1,227

Caimitillo is a town and corregimiento in the Panamá Province of Panama. It was separated from Chilibre corregimiento in 2012, and had a population of 34,097 in the 2023 census.

== Sources ==
- World Gazeteer: Panama – World-Gazetteer.com
