= Santa Ana, Panama City =

Santa Ana
- Corregimiento
- Location within Panama Location within Central America
- Coordinates: 8°57′26″N 79°32′32″W
- Country: Panama
- Province: Panamá
- District: Panamá

Area
  - Land: 0.8 km^{2} (0.31 sq mi)

Population (2010)
  - Total: 18,210
  - Density: 21,727.7/km^{2} (56,274/sq mi)
- Population density calculated based on land area.
- Time zone: UTC−5 (EST)

Santa Ana is a corregimiento within Panama City, in Panamá District, Panamá Province, Panama

== Population ==
Census year	Population
1990	27,657
2000	21,098
2010	18,210

== History ==
During the 18th century, the numerous fires that destroyed part of Panama City created a demographic boom in the Santa Ana community. Its historic church was moved in 1842. During the 1925 Tenant Movement, the US Army was deployed in Santa Ana to contain the demonstrations.

The Malambo orphanage was founded in 1890 in Santa Ana, and moved to a new location in 1995.

== Gallery ==
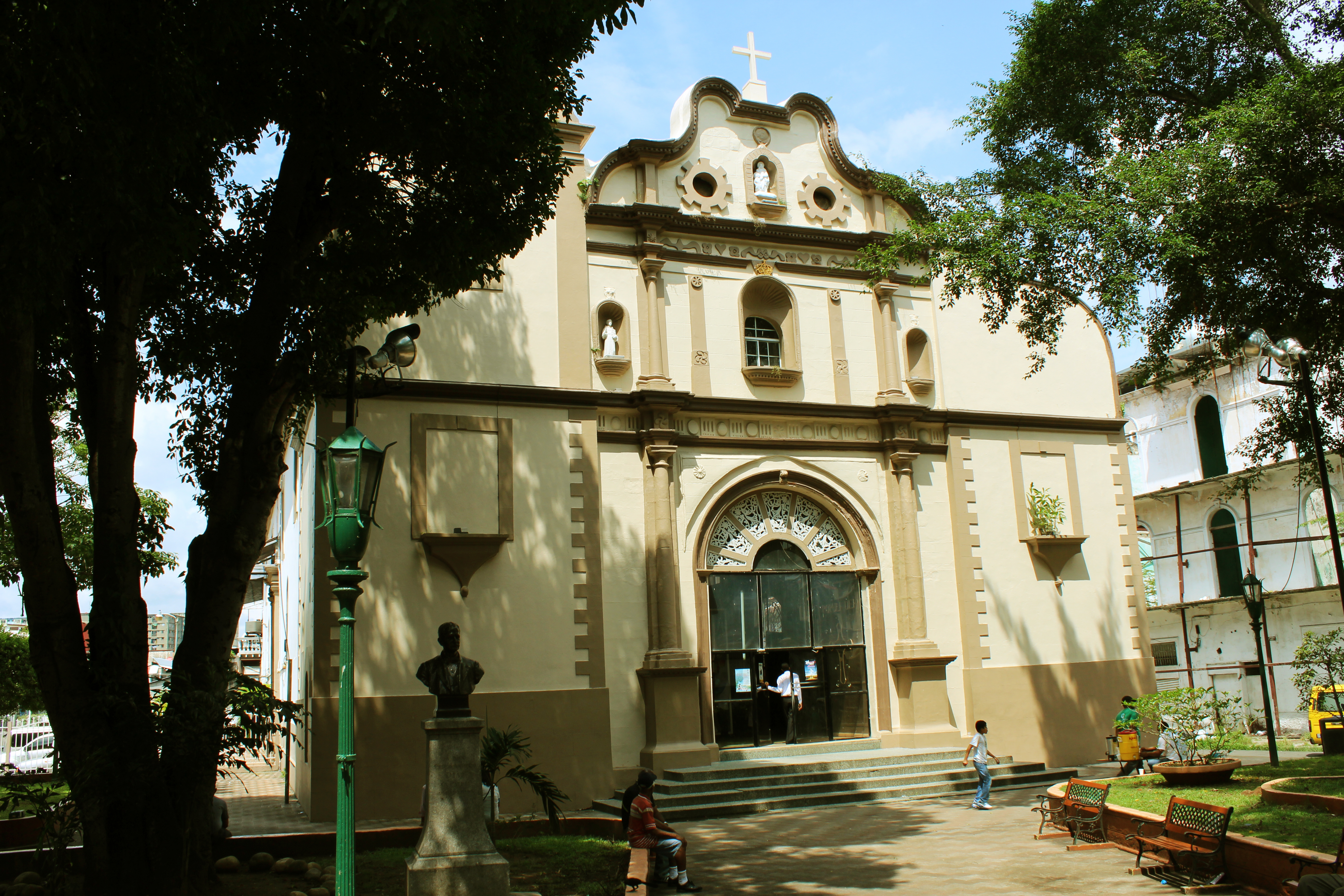
Iglesia de Santa Ana

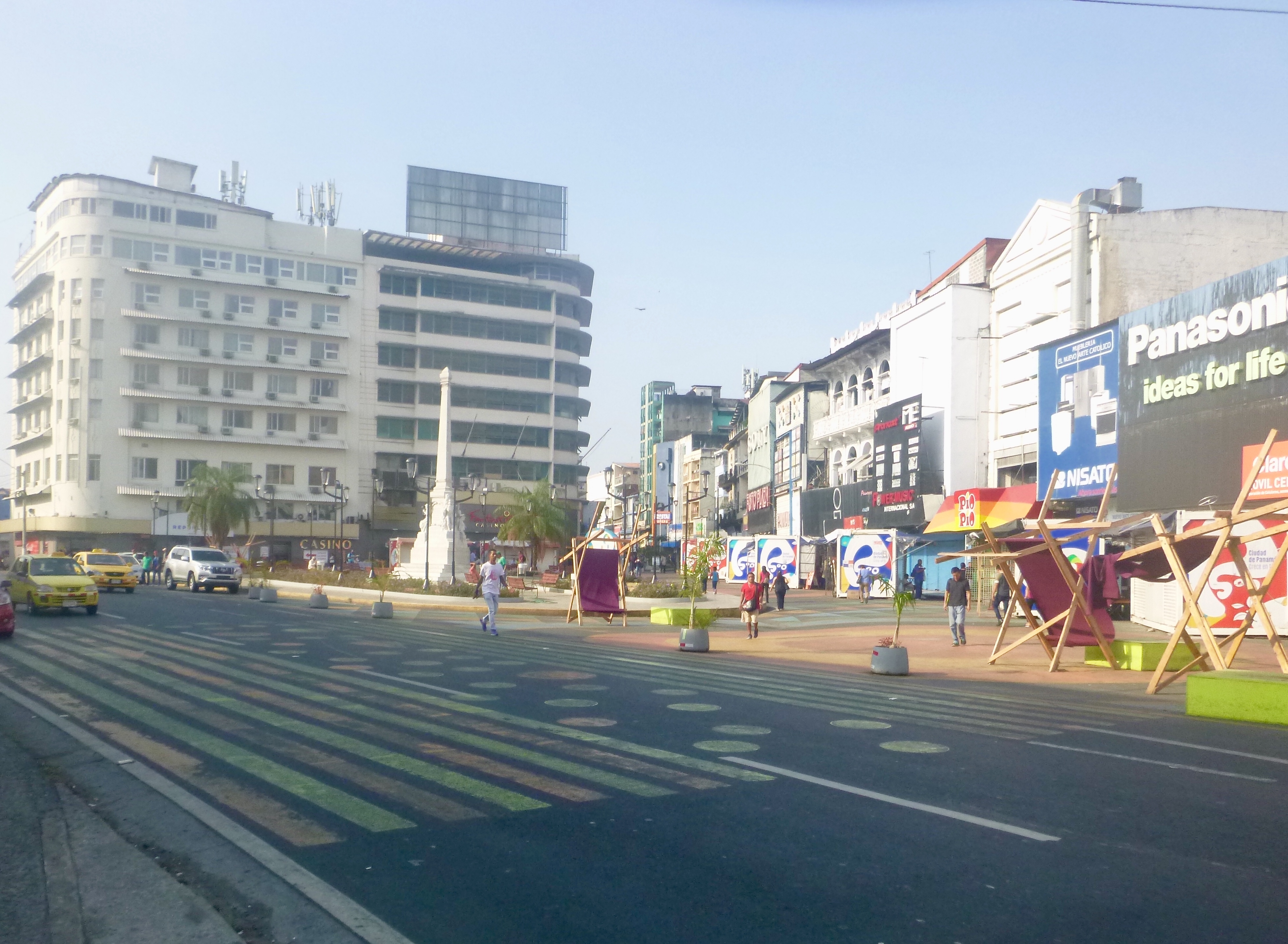
Plaza 5 de Mayo

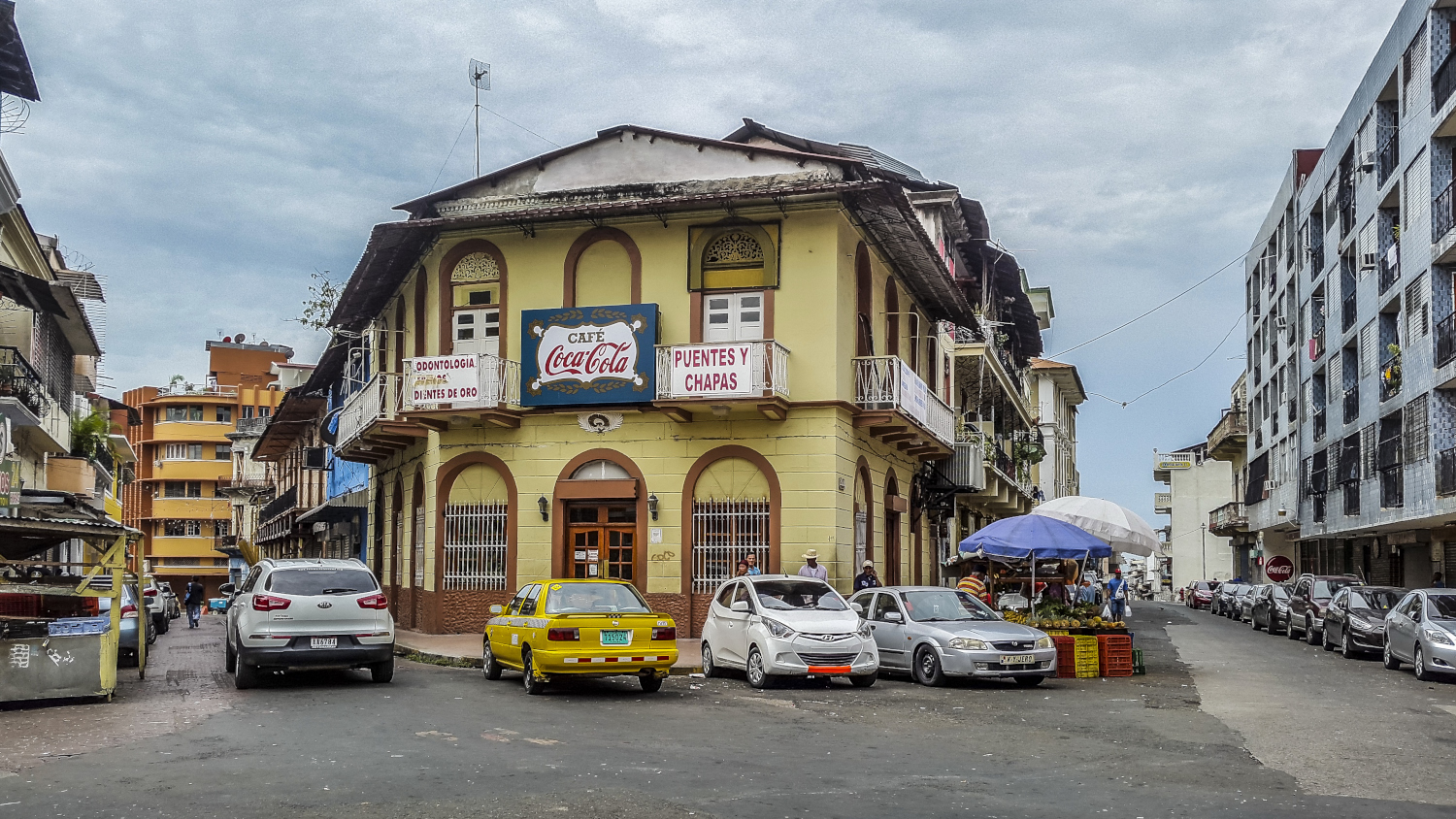
Café Coca-Cola

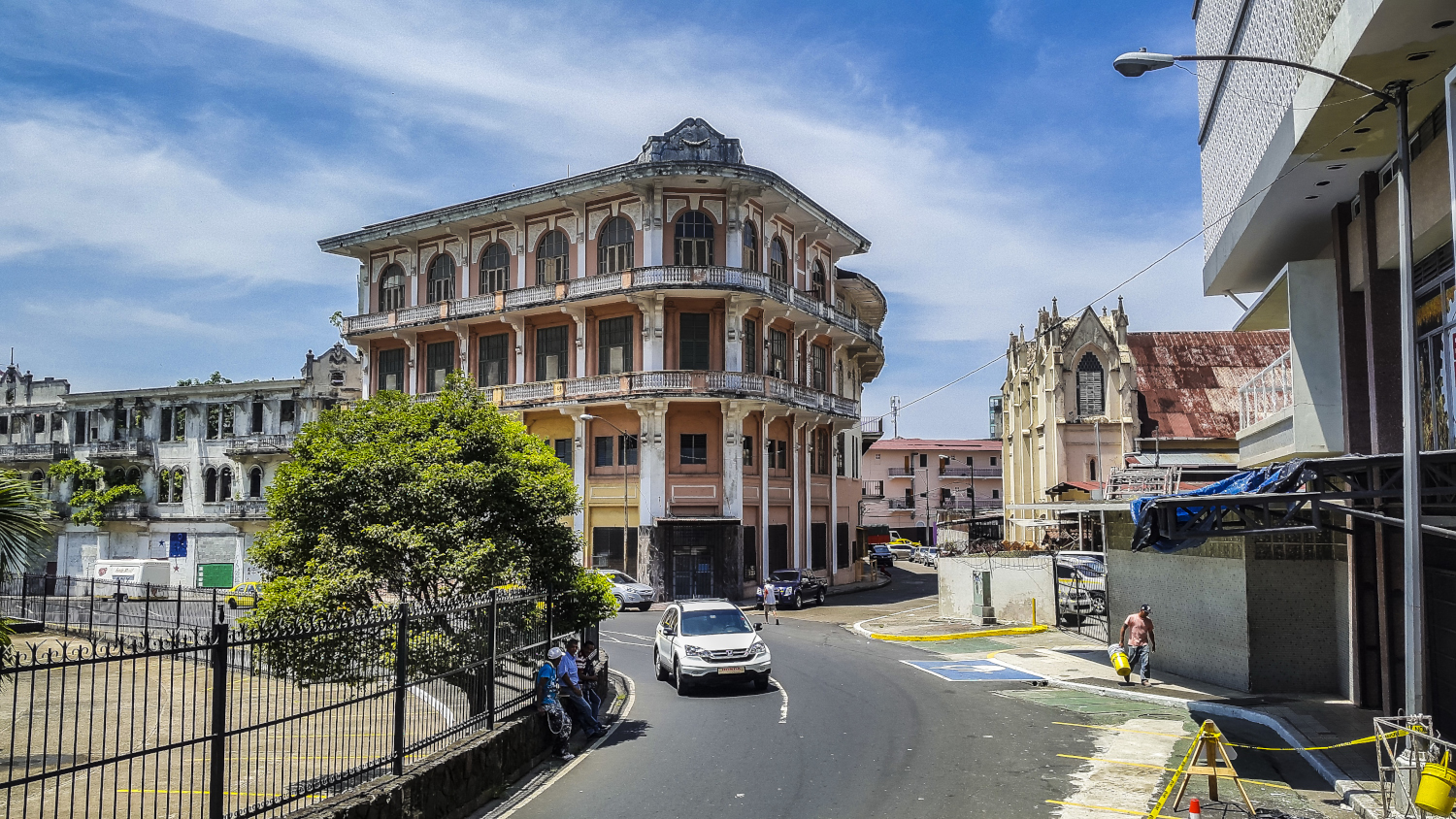
Antigua Biblioteca Nacional

== See also ==
- Casco Viejo, Panama
