= Juan Díaz, Panama City =

Coordinates: 9.0311°N 79.4311°W

Juan Díaz
- Corregimiento
- Location within Panama
- Country: Panama
- Province: Panamá
- District: Panamá

Area
  - Land: 34 km^{2} (13 sq mi)

Population (2010)
  - Total: 100,636
  - Density: 2,959.9/km^{2} (7,666/sq mi)
- Population density calculated based on land area.
- Time zone: UTC−5 (EST)

Juan Díaz is a corregimiento within Panama City, in Panamá District, Panamá Province, Panama with a population of 100,636 as of 2010. Its population as of 1990 was 73,809; its population as of 2000 was 88,165.
