= Pacora =

- Corregimiento
- Location within Panama
- Coordinates: 9°4′48″N 79°16′48″W
- Country: Panama
- Province: Panamá
- District: Panamá

Area
  - Land: 399.4 km^{2} (154.2 sq mi)

Population (2010)
  - Total: 52,494
  - Density: 131.4/km^{2} (340/sq mi)
- Population density calculated based on land area.
- Time zone: UTC−5 (EST)

Pacora is a town and corregimiento in Panamá District, Panamá Province, Panama located near Tocumen International Airport.

It is regarded as the industrial area of Panama where many multinationals are moving into for their logistics and industrial hub. More than 250 multinationals from manufacturing to IT services are moving there.
