= Panamá Province =

Province of Panama

Panamá Province Provincia de Panamá
- Province
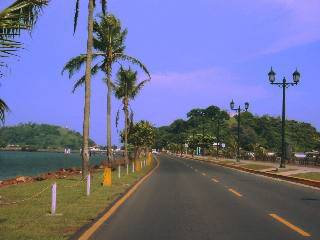
- Amador Causeway

- Coat of arms

- Location of Panama Province in Panama
- Coordinates: 9°0′N 79°10′W
- Country: Panama
- Capital city: Panama City

Government
  - Governor: Mayín Correa

Area
  - Total: 8,409 km^{2} (3,247 sq mi)
- Highest elevation: 1,300 m (4,300 ft)
- Lowest elevation: 0 m (0 ft)

Population (2023 census)
  - Total: 1,439,575
  - Rank: 1st
  - Density: 171.2/km^{2} (443.4/sq mi)

GDP (PPP, constant 2015 values)
  - Year: 2023
  - Total: $66.3 billion
  - Per capita: $33,200
- Time zone: UTC-5 (Eastern Time)
- ISO 3166 code: PA-8
- HDI (2019): 0.846 very high

Panamá is a province of Panama. It is the location of the national capital Panama City, which also serves as the provincial capital. The governor of the province is Mayín Correa, appointed by President José Raul Mulino.

== Administrative divisions ==
Panamá Province is now divided into 6 districts (Spanish: distritos) and subdivided into 55 corregimientos. The five former districts west of the Panama Canal were split off to form Panamá Oeste Province on 1 January 2014.

District	Area (km^{2})	Population Estimate 2010	Population Census 2023	Notes
Balboa	333	2,911	1,989	Islands in Gulf of Panama
Chepo	4,937	49,385	65,588	Eastern part of Province
Chimán	1,046	3,594	3,142	Southeast part of Province
Panamá	2,031	989,100	1,086,990	Including the national capital, Panama City
San Miguelito	50	336,074	280,777	Surrounded by Panamá District
Taboga	12	1,193	1,089	Islands in Gulf of Panama

District	Corregimientos	Seat (Cabecera)
Balboa District	San Miguel, La Ensenada, La Esmeralda, La Guinea, Pedro González, Saboga	San Miguel
Chepo District	San Cristóbal de Chepo, Cañita, Chepillo, El Llano, Las Margaritas, Santa Cruz de Chinina, Madungandí, Tortí	San Cristóbal de Chepo
Chimán District	Chimán, Brujas, Gonzalo Vásquez, Pásiga, Unión Santeña	Chimán
Panamá District	24 de Diciembre^{1}, Ancón^{1}, Bella Vista^{1}, Betania^{1}, Calidonia^{1}, Chilibre^{1}, Curundú^{1}, El Chorrillo^{1}, Juan Díaz^{1}, Las Cumbres^{1}, Las Mañanitas^{1}, Pacora^{1}, Parque Lefevre^{1}, Pedregal^{1}, Pueblo Nuevo^{1}, Río Abajo^{1}, San Felipe^{1}, San Francisco^{1}, San Martín^{1}, Santa Ana^{1}, Tocumen^{1}, Alcalde Díaz^{1}, Ernesto Córdoba Campos^{1}, Caimitillo^{1}	Panama City
San Miguelito District	Amelia Denis De Icaza^{2}, Belisario Porras^{2}, José Domingo Espinar^{2}, Mateo Iturralde^{2}, Victoriano Lorenzo^{2}, Arnulfo Arias^{2}, Belisario Frías^{2}, Omar Torrijos^{2}, Rufina Alfaro^{2}	San Miguelito
Taboga District	Taboga, Otoque Occidente, Otoque Oriente	Taboga

^{1} These corregimientos represent as Panama City
^{2} These corregimientos represent as San Miguelito City
