= List of football clubs in Panama =

In Panamanian football, Liga Panameña de Fútbol is the top league followed by the LPF Liga Prom.

== LPF ==
- Alianza FC
- Árabe Unido
- Atlético Chiriquí
- Club Deportivo del Este
- Independiente
- C.D. Plaza Amador
- Herrera F.C.
- San Francisco FC
- Sporting San Miguelito
- Tauro F.C.
- Universitario
- Veraguas C.D.

== LPF Liga Prom ==
| Team | City |
|---|---|
| Águilas de la Universidad de Panamá | Panama City, Panamá Province |
| Panamá City FC | Panama City, Panamá Province |
| Alianza FC U-20 | Juan Díaz, Panamá Province |
| Árabe Unido U-20 | Colón, Colón Province |
| Atlético Chiriquí U-20 | David, Chiriquí Province |
| Atlético Nacional | Juan Díaz, Panamá Province |
| CD Centenario | Colón, Colón Province |
| Colón C-3 | Colón, Colón Province |
| Champions FC Academy | Colón, Colón Province |
| Club Deportivo del Este U-20 | Pacora, Panamá Province |
| Herrera FC U-20 | Chitré, Herrera Province |
| C.A. Independiente U-20 | La Chorrera, Panamá Oeste Province |
| Club Mario Méndez FC | David, Chiriquí Province |
| Plaza Amador U-20 | El Chorrillo, Panamá Province |
| S.D. Panamá Oeste | Capira, Panamá Oeste Province |
| San Martín FC | San Martín, Panamá Province |
| San Francisco FC U-20 | La Chorrera, Panamá Oeste Province |
| Sporting San Miguelito U-20 | San Miguelito, Panamá Province |
| Tauro FC U-20 | Pedregal, Panamá Province |
| UDELAS | San Miguelito, Panamá Province |
| UMECIT FC | San Miguelito, Panamá Province |
| San Antonio Fútbol Club - Unión Coclé | Penonomé, Coclé Province |
| Universitario U-20 | Penonomé, Coclé Province |
| Veraguas CD U-20 | Santiago, Veraguas Province |

== Teams Name Changes ==
- Independiente Santa Fe to Atlético Santa Fé (1992)
- Club Deportivo La Previsora to San Francisco F.C. (1992)
- Río Mar (Puerto Armuelles) to Deportivo M&M (1993)
- Concordia FC merged with Tauro F.C. (1994)
- Sporting '89 to Sporting San Miguelito (2002)
- Sporting San Miguelito to Sporting Coclé (2002)
- River Plate FC to Colon River F.C. (2004)
- Sporting Coclé to Sporting '89´(2005)
- Sporting '89 to Sporting San Miguelito (2007)
- Chorrillito Fútbol Club to S.D. Panamá Oeste (2011)
- Deportivo El Tecal to C.D. Vista Alegre (2011)
- Santos FC (La Chorrera) to Costa del Este F.C. (2014)
- Millenium FC to Deportivo Municipal San Miguelito (2015)
- SUNTRACS F.C. to Leones de América (2016)
- C.D. Vista Alegre to Sport West FC (2016)
- Chorrillo FC to Unión Deportivo Universitario (2018)
- Atlético Veragüense to Azuero FC (2019)
- Azuero FC to Herrera FC (2021)
- Leones de América to CD Veraguas (2021)
- Costa del Este F.C. to Club Deportivo del Este (2021)

== Defunct Teams ==
=== Up to First Tier ===
- Bravos de Urraca / Bravos del Projusa (Santiago)
- Chepo F.C.
- Chirilanco F.C.
- Chiriquí F.C.
- CD Pan de Azúcar
- Colón C-3
- River Plate FC / Colón River FC
- Cosmos FC
- Deportivo Peru
- Ejecutivo Jr
- Eurokickers
- Municipal Colón
- Panamá Viejo F.C.
- Orión Municipal / A.D. Orión (won promotion as Linfuna team)
- Río Abajo F.C.
- Río Mar (Puerto Armuelles) / Deportivo M&M
- Santa Gema F.C.
- Sporting Colón
- Unión de San Miguelito

=== Up to Second Tier ===
- AD América (Bugaba)
- Atlético Guadalupe (La Chorrera)
- Bocas FC
- CD Atalanta (San Sebastián, Panama City)
- Deportivo El Tecal / C.D. Vista Alegre / Sport West FC
- Club River Plate (David)
- Chiriquí Occidente F.C.
- Coclé FC
- Chorrillito FC (Arraijan)
- Deportivo Génesis (Panama City)
- Deportivo Italia (Panama City)
- F.C. Veraguas 2010
- Barraza FC / Millenium UP / Millenium FC / Deportivo Municipal San Miguelito
- New York FC (Colón)
- Sabanitas FC (Colón)
- Paraiso FC / Tierra Firme FC
