= 2005 Primera A =

Liga Nacional de Ascenso
- Season: 2005
- Champions: Policía Nacional

The Primera A 2005 season (officially "Torneo Primera A 2005") started in April 2005 resulting Policia Nacional as winners and promoted to Anaprof, while CD Atalanta lost second promotion playoff series against Sporting '89.

== Primera A 2005 teams ==
11 teams participating divided into two groups.

Club	City	Stadium	Group
A.D. Orión	San Miguelito	Estadio Bernardo Gil	Group B
Atlético Guadalupe	La Chorrera	Estadio Agustín Sánchez	Group A
Bocas FC	Changuinola		Group A
C.A.I.	La Chorrera	Estadio Agustín Sánchez	Group A
C.D. Atalanta	Panama City		Group A
C.D. Pan de Azúcar	San Miguelito	Estadio Balboa	Group B
Chepo F.C.	Chepo	Estadio José de la Luz Thompson	Group B
Deportivo Italia	Panama City		Group B
Policía Nacional	Panama City		Group A
Río Abajo	Panama City	Estadio Bernardo Gil	Group B
Sabanitas FC	Colón		Group B

== Primera A 2005 Standings ==
- Group A

Place	Team	Played	Won	Draw	Lost	Goals Scored	Goals Conceded	+/- (Dif.)	Points
1.	Policía Nacional	14	8	4	2	31	12	+19	28
2.	C.D. Atalanta	14	5	5	4	22	26	-4	20
3.	C.A. Independiente	14	3	5	6	17	24	-7	14
4.	Bocas FC	14	4	1	9	22	42	-20	13
5.	Atl. Guadalupe	14	2	5	7	13	23	-10	11

- Group B

Place	Team	Played	Won	Draw	Lost	Goals Scored	Goals Conceded	+/- (Dif.)	Points
1.	Chepo FC	15	13	0	2	47	18	+29	39
2.	Deportivo Italia	14	7	4	3	25	16	+9	25
3.	A.D. Orión	15	7	3	5	24	22	+2	24
4.	Río Abajo FC	15	6	1	8	23	26	-3	19
5.	C.D. Pan de Azucar	14	6	0	8	20	26	-6	18
6.	Sabanitas FC	15	2	4	9	17	26	-9	10

- Green indicates qualified teams for the second round
- Red indicates relegation

== Hexagonal Round ==
Place	Team	Played	Won	Draw	Lost	Goals Scored	Goals Conceded	+/- (Dif.)	Points
1.	Policia Nacional	9	6	1	2	20	14	+6	19
2.	A.D. Orión	9	5	3	1	10	7	+3	18
3.	C.D. Atalanta	9	4	4	1	12	7	+5	16
4.	Chepo FC	9	5	0	4	20	14	+6	15
5.	Deportivo Italia	9	2	2	5	21	22	-1	8
6.	C.A. Independiente	9	0	0	9	8	35	-27	0

- Green indicates qualified teams for semifinal round

== Final Round ==
Semifinals (agg)
Policia Nacional	3
Chepo FC	3
A.D. Orion	5
C.D. Atalanta	10

Final
Policia Nacional	1
C.D. Atalanta	0

=== Semifinals 1st leg ===
Chepo FC	2-1	Policia Nacional

C.D. Atalanta	8-2	A.D. Orión

=== Semifinals 2nd leg ===
Policia Nacional	2-1	Chepo FC

A.D. Orión	3-2	C.D. Atalanta

=== Final ===
Policia Nacional	1-0	C.D. Atalanta

Primera A 2005 Champion:
Policia Nacional

== Promotion playoff ==
Team 1	Agg.	Team 2	1st leg	2nd leg
Sporting '89	3–1	C.D. Atalanta	1–0	2–1

C.D. Atalanta remain in Primera A

=== 1st leg ===
Sporting '89	1-0	C.D. Atalanta

=== 2nd leg ===
C.D. Atalanta	1-2	Sporting '89
