= 2006 Primera A =

Liga Nacional de Ascenso
- Season: 2006
- Champions: Chepo F.C.

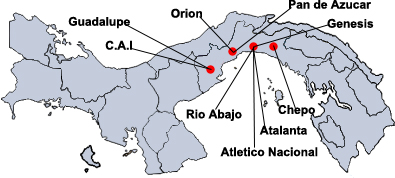
Primera A 2006 team distribution

The Primera A 2006 season (officially "Torneo Primera A 2006") started on April 8, 2006. On October 4, 2006 Chepo F.C. beat 2-1 Pan de Azúcar and was promoted to the ANAPROF while Atalanta was relegated to Copa Rommel Fernández. Policía Nacional was relegated from ANAPROF and Paraiso F.C. was promoted from the Copa Rommel Fernández

After the end of the season Ateltico Guadalupe ceased to exist after financial problem, and since the league only counted with 7 teams instead of the 8 required to play a season, the 2007 season was canceled.

== Primera A 2006 teams ==
| Club | City | Stadium |
|---|---|---|
| Atalanta | Panama City | |
| C.A.I. | La Chorrera | Estadio Agustín Sánchez |
| Chepo F.C. | Chepo | Estadio José de la Luz Thompson |
| Guadalupe | La Chorrera | Estadio Agustín Sánchez |
| Genesis | Panama City | |
| Orion | San Miguelito | |
| Pan de Azúcar | San Miguelito | |
| Río Abajo F.C. | Panama City | |

== Primera A 2006 Standings ==
| Place (Posición) | Team (Equipo) | Played (PJ) | Won (PG) | Draw (PE) | Lost (PP) | Goals Scored (GF) | Goals Conceded (GC) | +/- (Dif.) | Points (Pts.) |
|---|---|---|---|---|---|---|---|---|---|
| 1. | Chepo F.C. | 14 | 7 | 6 | 1 | 41 | 23 | +18 | 27 |
| 2. | Pan de Azúcar | 14 | 7 | 3 | 4 | 33 | 22 | +11 | 24 |
| 3. | Genesis | 14 | 7 | 3 | 4 | 31 | 32 | -1 | 24 |
| 4. | Orion | 14 | 6 | 4 | 4 | 32 | 28 | +4 | 22 |
| 5. | C.A.I. | 14 | 4 | 7 | 3 | 23 | 22 | +1 | 19 |
| 6. | Río Abajo F.C. | 14 | 4 | 6 | 4 | 34 | 31 | +3 | 18 |
| 7. | Atletico Guadalupe | 14 | 3 | 3 | 8 | 27 | 39 | -12 | 12 |
| 8. | Atalanta | 14 | 2 | 0 | 12 | 18 | 42 | -24 | 6 |

- Green indicates qualified teams for the final round
- Red indicates relegation

== Results table ==
| Home \ Away | ATA | CAI | CHE | GUA | GEN | ORI | PAN | RÍO |
|---|---|---|---|---|---|---|---|---|
| Atalanta | — | 1–3 | 3–5 | 0–1 | 2–4 | 1–6 | 0–1 | 2–3 |
| C.A.I. | 1–0 | — | 0–1 | 2–0 | 3–2 | 2–2**** | 0–0 | 2–2 |
| Chepo | 3–0** | 3–3 | — | 5–2 | 1–4 | 3–1 | 6–2 | 1–1 |
| Guadalupe | 4–1*** | 5–2 | 2–2 | — | 2–3 | 1–2 | 0–7 | 2–5 |
| Genesis | 2–1 | 1–1 | 1–7 | 2–2 | — | 1–3 | 2–1 | 4–1 |
| Orion | 2–4 | 2–1 | 2–2 | 2–2 | 2–2 | — | 1–3 | 2–2 |
| Pan de Azúcar | 2–3 | 1–1 | 2–2 | 1–0 | 4–0 | 3–1 | — | 1–3 |
| Río Abajo | 5–0 | 2–2 | 0–0* | 4–4 | 2–3 | 1–3 | 3–5 | — |

Legend: Blue = home team win; Yellow = draw; Red = away team win.
- [*] Numerical result unknown, however it is known that the game ended in a tie
- [**] Result also reported 3-1
- [***] Result also reported 3-1
- [****] Result also reported 0-0

== Final round ==
| Place (Posición) | Team (Equipo) | Played (PJ) | Won (PG) | Draw (PE) | Lost (PP) | Goals Scored (GF) | Goals Conceded (GC) | +/- (Dif.) | Points (Pts.) |
|---|---|---|---|---|---|---|---|---|---|
| 1. | Chepo F.C. | 5 | 4 | 0 | 1 | 15 | 5 | +10 | 12 |
| 2. | Pan de Azúcar | 5 | 3 | 0 | 2 | 9 | 7 | +2 | 9 |
| 3. | Orion | 5 | 1 | 1 | 3 | 5 | 10 | -5 | 4 |
| 4. | Genesis | 5 | 1 | 1 | 3 | 9 | 16 | -7 | 4 |

- Green indicates teams playing a final game for promotion
- Round 6 games were not played due to irrelevance

| Home \ Away | CHE | GEN | ORI | PAN |
|---|---|---|---|---|
| Chepo | — | 1–3 | 4–1 | 2–0 |
| Genesis | 1–2 | — | n/p | 1–3 |
| Orion | 0–2 | 2–2 | — | 0–1 |
| Pan de Azúcar | n/p | 8–2 | 1–2 | — |

Legend: Blue = home team win; Yellow = draw; Red = away team win.

=== Final ===
October 4, 2006

| Pan de Azúcar | 1-2 | Chepo F.C. |

Estadio Rommel Fernández

Primera A 2006 Champion:

Chepo F.C.
First Title
