= 2009 Copa Rommel Fernández =

Football season in Panama

Copa Rommel Fernández
- Season: 2009

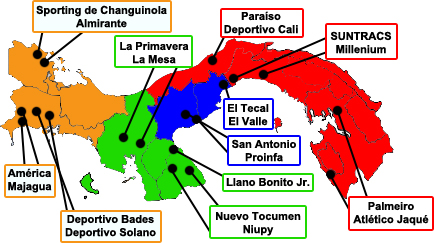
Copa Rommel Fernández 2009 team distribution

The Copa Rommel Fernández 2009 season (officially "XIII Copa Rommel Fernández ") started in January 2009. "Copa Rommel Fernández" is Panama's national club football championship founded in 1996.

On 26 February 2009 Millenium was crowned champions after defeating El Tecal 5-4 after extra time. Due to the expansion of Primera A, both teams were promoted and will participate in the 2009 season. José Tobio was the top goal scorer in this 2009 season with 9 goals.

== 2009 teams ==
=== Zone 1 ===
- East Panamá, Colón and Darién

Club	City	Qualified as
Atlético Jaqué	Jaqué	Darién 2
Deportivo Cali	Colón	Colón 2
Millenium F.C.	Panama City	East Panamá 2
Palmeiro F.C.	Metetí	Darién 1
Paraíso F.C.	Colón	Colón 1
SUNTRACS F.C.	San Miguelito	East Panamá 1

=== Zone 2 ===
- West Panamá and Coclé

Club	City	Qualified as
Deportivo El Tecal	Arraiján	West Panamá 1
Deportivo El Valle	Arraiján	West Panamá 2
Proinfa	Antón	Coclé 2
San Antonio	Penonomé	Coclé 1

=== Zone 3 ===
- Herrera, Los Santos and Veraguas

Club	City	Qualified as
Llano Bonito Jr.	Chitré	Herrera
La Mesa	La Mesa	Veraguas 2
Niupy	Macaracas	Los Santos 2
Nuevo Tocumen	Las Tablas	Los Santos 1
La Primavera	San Antonio	Veraguas 1

=== Zone 4 ===
- Bocas del Toro, Chiriquí and Occidental Chiriquí

Club	City	Qualified as
Almirante	Almirante	Bocas del Toro 2
América	Divalá	Occidental Chiriquí 2
Deportivo Bades	David	Chiriquí 1
Deportivo Solano	Bugaba	Chiriquí 2
Majagua	Finca Blanco	Occidental Chiriquí 1
Sporting de Changuinola	Changuinola	Bocas del Toro 1

== Regular round ==
=== Zone 1 ===
- Results from the 4 and 5 feature are unknown, however both SUNTRACS and Millenium qualified.

Team	Pld	W	D	L	GF	GA	GD	Pts
SUNTRACS	3	2	1	0	8	3	+5	7
Deportivo Cali	3	1	2	0	10	4	+6	5
Millenium	3	1	1	1	7	3	+4	4
Paraíso	3	1	1	1	6	7	-1	4
Atlético Jaqué	3	1	1	1	5	9	-4	4
Palmeiro	3	0	0	3	2	14	-12	0

Millenium	5-0	Atlético Jaqué
Paraíso	5-0	Palmeiro
SUNTRACS	2-2	Deportivo Cali
Paraíso	2-2	Deportivo Cali
SUNTRACS	1-0	Millenium
Atlético Jaqué	3-2	Palmeiro
SUNTRACS	2-2	Deportivo Cali
SUNTRACS	5-1	Paraíso
Deportivo Cali	6-0	Palmeiro
Atlético Jaqué	2-2	Millenium

- Green indicates teams qualified to the final round

=== Zone 2 ===
Team	Pld	W	D	L	GF	GA	GD	Pts
El Valle	3	2	1	0	8	1	+7	7
El Tecal	3	1	2	0	5	3	+2	5
San Antonio	3	1	1	1	3	2	+1	4
Proinfa	3	0	0	3	1	11	-10	0

El Valle	1-0	San Antonio
El Tecal	3-1	Proinfa
El Tecal	1-1	El Valle
San Antonio	2-0	Proinfa
El Valle	6-0	Proinfa
San Antonio	1-1	El Tecal

- Green indicates teams qualified to the final round

=== Zone 3 ===
Team	Pld	W	D	L	GF	GA	GD	Pts
La Primavera	4	3	0	1	6	4	+2	9
Llano Bonito Jr.	4	2	1	1	9	4	+5	7
Nuevo Tocumen	4	2	0	2	7	6	+1	6
La Mesa	4	1	1	2	10	10	0	4
Niupy	4	1	0	3	3	9	-5	3

La Primavera	0-1	Niupy
La Mesa	2-2	Llano Bonito Jr.
Nuevo Tocumen	1-0	Niupy
La Primavera	2-1	La Mesa
La Primavera	2-1	Nuevo Tocumen
Llano Bonito Jr.	3-1	Niupy
La Mesa	5-1	Niupy
Llano Bonito Jr.	2-0	Nuevo Tocumen
La Primavera	2-1	Llano Bonito Jr.
La Mesa	2-5	Nuevo Tocumen

- Green indicates teams qualified to the final round

=== Zone 4 ===
- Results from the 4 and 5 feature are unknown, however both America and Majagua qualified.

Team	Pld	W	D	L	GF	GA	GD	Pts
América	3	2	1	0	2	0	+2	7
Majagua	3	2	0	1	4	2	+2	6
Deportivo Solano	3	2	0	1	3	1	+2	6
Sporting de Changuinola	3	1	0	2	7	6	+1	3
Deportivo Bades	3	1	0	2	3	4	-1	3
Almirante	3	0	1	2	2	8	-6	1

Majagua	1-0	Solano
Sporting Changuinola	5-1	Almirante
Solano	1-0	Bades
América	1-0	Majagua
Bades	3-2	Sporting Changuinola
América	0-0	Almirante
Solano	2-0	Sporting Changuinola
Majagua	3-1	Almirante
América	1-0	Bades

- Green indicates teams qualified to the final round

== Final round ==
Quarter-finals
8 February - Estadio Bernardo Gil
SUNTRACS	5
Llano Bonito Jr.	0
8 February - Estadio Virgilio Tejeira
Millenium (pen.)	2 (4)
Majagua	2 (1)
8 February - Estadio Virgilio Tejeira
El Tecal	3
La Primavera	2
8 February - Estadio Bernardo Gil
El Valle	1
América	2

Semi-finals
15 February - Estadio Virgilio Tejeira
SUNTRACS	0
Millenium	1
15 February - Estadio Virgilio Tejeira
El Tecal	5
América	1

Final
26 February - Cancha Sintetica Rommel Fernández
Millenium	5
El Tecal	4

=== Quarterfinals ===
8 February 2009

SUNTRACS	5-0	Llano Bonito Jr.
Aimar Yamir Applewhite; Miguel Bello; Jonathan Braswell; Alexis King

Estadio Bernardo Gil

8 February 2009

Millenium	2-2	Majagua
Penalties
	4-1

Estadio Virgilio Tejeira

Millenium advances to final 4–1 on penalties

8 February 2009

El Tecal	3-2	La Primavera

Estadio Virgilio Tejeira

8 February 2009

El Valle	1-2	América
Tomas Andrade		Felipe Steward; Miguel Ramos 75'

Estadio Bernardo Gil

=== Semifinals ===
15 February 2009

El Tecal	5-1	América
Rigoberto González; David Gomez; Fernando Araúz		José Ramos

Estadio Virgilio Tejeira

15 February 2009

SUNTRACS	0-1	Millenium
		José Tobio 83'

Estadio Virgilio Tejeira

=== Final ===
26 February 2009

Millenium	5-4	El Tecal
José Tobio 19' 96'; 47'; 85'; 110'		Lucas Araúz 4'; Marcos Pitty 6'; Jair Catuy 40'; 98'

Cancha Sintetica Rommel Fernández

2009 Champion:

Millenium F.C.
1st Title

== Top goalscorer ==
9 goals

- (Panama) José Tobio (Millenium)
