= 2009 Liga Nacional de Ascenso =

Liga Nacional de Ascenso
- Season: 2009
- Champions: Río Abajo
- Promoted: No promotion
- Relegated: No relegation
- Top goalscorer: Apertura: (Panama) Andy Nuñez (20 goals); Clausura: (Panama) Roberty Morales (21 goals)
- Biggest home win: Orión 9–1 Génesis
- Biggest away win: Génesis 0–13 Pan de Azúcar
- Highest scoring: Génesis 0–13 Pan de Azúcar

The Liga Nacional de Ascenso 2009 season (officially "Torneo Primera A 2009") started on February 28, 2009. The defending champion and Apertura winner was Río Abajo and the Clausura winner was Orión. On December 12, 2009, a grand final was played where Río Abajo were crowned champions of the Liga Nacional de Ascenso after defeating Orión 3–1. However (as it happened in the 2008 edition) Río Abajo lost the promotion play-off, but this time against Alianza in a 2–1 aggregate score, thus failing to promote to the Liga Panameña de Fútbol.

The champion was promoted directly without playing a promotion play-off.

== Changes for 2009 ==
- The league increased the number of participating teams from 8 to 10.
- After the Apertura I season Primera A changed its name to Liga Nacional de Ascenso.

== Liga Nacional de Ascenso 2009 teams ==
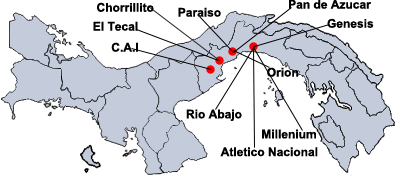
Primera A 2009 team distribution

Club	City	Stadium
Atlético Nacional	Panama City	Cuadro de Kobee
Chorrillito	Arraiján	Campo de Campana
C.A.I.	La Chorrera	Estadio Agustín Sánchez
El Tecal	Arraiján	Campo de Campana
Génesis	Panama City	Estadio Balboa
Millenium	Panama City	Estadio Bernardo Gil
Orión	San Miguelito	Estadio Bernardo Gil
Pan de Azúcar	San Miguelito	Estadio Balboa
Paraíso	San Miguelito	Estadio Bernardo Gil
Río Abajo	Panama City	Estadio Bernardo Gil

== Primera A Apertura 2009 I ==
=== Standings ===
Place	Team	Played	Won	Draw	Lost	Goals Scored	Goals Conceded	+/-	Points
1.	Río Abajo	18	12	5	1	48	20	+28	41
2.	Atlético Nacional	18	10	5	3	34	17	+17	35
3.	C.A.I.	18	11	2	5	35	22	+13	35
4.	Paraíso	18	9	5	4	43	28	+15	32
5.	Chorrillito	18	10	1	7	35	36	-1	31
6.	Pan de Azúcar	18	7	3	8	49	33	+16	24
7.	Orión	18	7	2	9	37	33	+4	23
8.	Millenium	18	5	3	10	29	38	-9	18
9.	El Tecal	18	4	2	12	19	48	-29	14
10.	Génesis	18	1	0	17	19	72	-53	3

Qualified to the final round.

=== Positions by round ===
Team ╲ Round	1	2	3	4	5	6	7	8	9	10	11	12	13	14	15	16	17	18
Atlético Nacional	6	5	4	2	2	2	2	4	4	3	3	3	3	2	2	2	2	2
Chorrillito	2	2	2	4	5	4	4	3	3	4	5	4	4	4	4	4	4	5
Independiente	1	1	1	1	1	1	1	1	1	1	1	1	2	3	3	3	3	3
El Tecal	3	4	5	7	7	8	9	9	9	8	8	9	9	9	9	9	9	9
Génesis	8	10	10	8	9	9	10	10	10	10	10	10	10	10	10	10	10	10
Millenium	4	3	3	2	3	5	6	7	8	9	9	8	8	8	8	8	8	8
Orión	6	6	6	5	6	6	7	5	5	5	4	5	6	6	6	7	7	7
Pan de Azúcar	10	9	8	10	8	7	5	6	6	7	7	7	7	7	7	6	6	6
Paraíso	9	8	9	9	10	10	8	8	7	6	6	6	5	5	5	5	5	4
Río Abajo	4	7	7	6	4	3	3	2	2	2	2	2	1	1	1	1	1	1

Source: (in Spanish)

=== Results table ===
Home \ Away	ATL	CHO	CAI	ELT	GÉN	MIL	ORI	PAN	PAR	RÍO
Atl. Nacional	—	3–1	3–1	2–0	7–1	0–0	2–1	0–1	1–2	2–2
Chorrillito	1–5	—	0–3	1–0	3–1	3–2	2–2	2–1	4–2	0–4
C.A.I.	0–0	3–1	—	2–0	2–1	1–3	3–2	2–1	1–1	2–3
El Tecal	0–2	0–4	1–2	—	2–1	1–1	4–2	0–3	0–6	0–2
Génesis	(2)*	3–2	1–3	1–2	—	0–3**	1–4	0–13	1–6	0–7
Millenium	2–3	0–1	2–1	6–0	1–0	—	1–2	3–7	1–2	1–5
Orión	1–1	0–2	3–0	4–1	6–4	0–1	—	5–2	3–1	0–1
Pan de Azúcar	0–1	3–4	0–4	3–4	3–0	4–0	2–0	—	3–3	0–0
Paraíso	3–1	2–0	0–3	2–2	5–2	4–2	2–1	1–1	—	0–1
Río Abajo	1–1	2–4	2–0	4–2	4–2	2–2	3–1	4–2	1–1	—

Legend: Blue = home team win; Yellow = draw; Red = away team win.
- [*] Génesis and Atlético Nacional was initially postponed to a later date. The game result is unknown however it is known that Atl. Nacional managed to beat Génesis.
- [**]Millenium won by default because Genesis did not show up.

=== Final Round ===
Semifinals (agg)
Río Abajo	5
Paraíso	4
Atlético Nacional	1
C.A.I.	2

Final
Río Abajo	1
C.A.I.	0

==== Semifinals 1st leg ====
June 24, 2009

Paraíso	4–3	Río Abajo

Estadio Bernardo Gil

June 25, 2009

C.A.I.	0–1	Atlético Nacional

Estadio Agustín Sánchez

==== Semifinals 2nd leg ====
June 27, 2009

Río Abajo	2–0	Paraíso

Estadio Bernardo Gil

June 28, 2008

Atlético Nacional	0–2	C.A.I.

Cuadro de Kobee

==== Final ====
July 3, 2009

Río Abajo	1–0	C.A.I.
John Gittens 115'

Cancha Sintetica Rommel Fernández

Apertura 2009 I Champion:
Río Abajo

=== Top Goal Scorer ===
Position	Player	Scored for	Goals
1	(Panama) Andy Nuñez	Pan de Azúcar	20
2	(Panama) Mario Cox	Chorrillito	17
3	(Panama) Roberty Morales	Pan de Azúcar	13
4	Shamar Amantine	Orión	10
5	(Panama) Aramis Haywood	Río Abajo	9

== Liga Nacional de Ascenso Apertura 2009 II ==
=== Standings ===
Place	Team	Played	Won	Draw	Lost	Goals Scored	Goals Conceded	+/-	Points
1.	Río Abajo	18	13	1	4	52	16	+36	40
2.	Paraíso	18	11	3	4	42	25	+17	36
3.	Orión	18	10	3	5	62	34	+28	33
4.	Pan de Azúcar	18	10	2	6	37	31	+6	32
5.	Chorrillito	18	10	1	7	37	24	+13	31
6.	Atlético Nacional	18	8	4	6	36	25	+11	28
7.	Independiente	18	5	4	9	31	45	-14	19
8.	Millenium	18	5	3	10	27	46	-19	18
9.	El Tecal	18	4	5	9	33	46	-13	17
10.	Génesis	18	0	2	16	15	80	-65	2

Qualified to the final round.

=== Results table ===
Home \ Away	ATL	CHO	CAI	ELT	GÉN	MIL	ORI	PAN	PAR	RÍO
Atl. Nacional	—	0–1	6–1	2–2	5–0	3–0	0–0	1–0	0–3	1–3
Chorrillito	2–4	—	5–0	2–1	3–0	3–1	3–1	2–4	1–2	1–0
C.A.I.	1–0	2–1	—	4–1	3–3	2–2	0–1	1–4	1–1	2–3
El Tecal	2–3	1–1	1–1	—	4–0	1–0	2–2	3–3	3–5	2–3
Génesis	0–5	0–4	1–4	2–3	—	2–2	3–7	0–6	0–5	1–9
Millenium	2–1	2–4	2–2	3–4	2–1	—	2–5	1–1	0–4	1–0
Orión	2–3	1–2	6–3	4–1	9–1	3–3	—	5–0	5–1	2–3
Pan de Azúcar	1–1	2–1	3–2	4–1	3–1	6–2	2–0	—	0–1	0–6
Paraíso	1–1	3–2	2–0	3–1	5–0	0–2	3–6	1–2	—	1–0
Río Abajo	4–0	1–0	4–0	6–0	4–0	1–0	2–3	2–1	1–1	—

Legend: Blue = home team win; Yellow = draw; Red = away team win.

=== Positions by round ===
Team ╲ Round	1	2	3	4	5	6	7	8	9	10	11	12	13	14	15	16	17	18
Atlético Nacional	5	3	3	2	2	2	2	5	5	5	5	4	5	5	6	6	5	6
Chorrillito	8	9	8	3	7	5	6	7	7	9	7	6	6	6	5	4	6	5
Independiente	7	4	4	8	8	7	7	6	6	6	6	7	7	7	7	8	7	7
El Tecal	1	5	5	7	6	8	8	8	9	8	8	9	9	9	9	9	9	9
Génesis	10	10	10	10	10	10	10	10	10	10	10	10	10	10	10	10	10	10
Millenium	9	8	6	9	9	9	9	9	8	7	9	8	8	8	8	7	8	8
Orión	5	7	9	6	5	3	3	2	2	3	1	3	4	4	2	3	3	3
Pan de Azúcar	2	1	2	5	4	6	5	4	3	2	4	5	3	3	4	5	4	4
Paraíso	3	6	7	3	3	4	4	3	4	4	2	1	1	1	3	2	2	2
Río Abajo	4	2	1	1	1	1	1	1	1	1	3	2	2	2	1	1	1	1

Source: (in Spanish)

=== Final Round ===
Semifinals (agg)
Río Abajo	3
Pan de Azúcar	2
Paraíso	2
Orión	3

Final
Río Abajo	3
Orión	3

==== Semifinals 1st leg ====
December 2, 2009

Orión	2–1	Paraíso
Roberty Morales; Luis Rentería		Eugenio Galvan

Cancha Sintetica Rommel Fernández

December 2, 2009

Pan de Azúcar	1–1	Río Abajo
Eladio Carranza		Aramis Haywood

Cancha Sintetica Rommel Fernández

==== Semifinals 2nd leg ====
December 5, 2009

Paraíso	1–1	Orión
William Jimenez		Jorgen Jaén

Cancha Sintetica Rommel Fernández

December 5, 2008

Río Abajo	2–1	Pan de Azúcar
Cesar Gutierrez 7'; Jefferson Viveros 34'		Joel Valdes 10'

Estadio Bernardo Gil

==== Final ====
December 10, 2009

Río Abajo	3–3	Orión
Fidel Cesar 36'; Cesar Gutierrez 42'; Jefferson Viveros 74'		Jose Ruiz 10'; Mark Victoria 50'; Arturo Castillo 85'
Penalties
	3–5

Cancha Sintetica Rommel Fernández

Apertura 2009 II Champion:
Orión

=== Top Goal Scorer ===
Position	Player	Scored for	Goals
1	(Panama) Roberty Morales	Orión	21
2	(Colombia) Jefferson Viveros	Río Abajo	19
3	(Panama) Luis Rentería (Panama) Eduardo Santos	Orión; Chorrillito	15
5	(Panama) Andy Nuñez	Pan de Azúcar	10

== Liga Nacional de Ascenso 2009 Grand Final ==
Club	Champion
Río Abajo	Apertura 2009 I Champion
Orión	Apertura 2009 II Champion

=== Grand Final ===
December 12, 2009

Río Abajo	3–1	Orión
Aramis Haywood 3' 44'; Yan Palacios 28'		Arturo Castillo 6'

Cancha Sintetica Rommel Fernández

Primera A 2008 Champion:

Río Abajo
2nd Title

== Promotion playoff ==
Team 1	Agg.	Team 2	1st leg	2nd leg
Alianza	2–1	Río Abajo	1–1	1–0

Río Abajo remain in Liga Nacional de Ascenso

=== 1st leg ===
December 16, 2009

Alianza	1–1	Río Abajo
Francisco Lopez 4'		Jefferson Viveros 21'

Cancha Sintetica Rommel Fernández

=== 2nd leg ===
December 19, 2009

Río Abajo	0–1	Alianza
		William Aguilar 87'

Cancha Sintetica Rommel Fernández
