= Edgardo Fariña =

Panamanian footballer (born 2001)

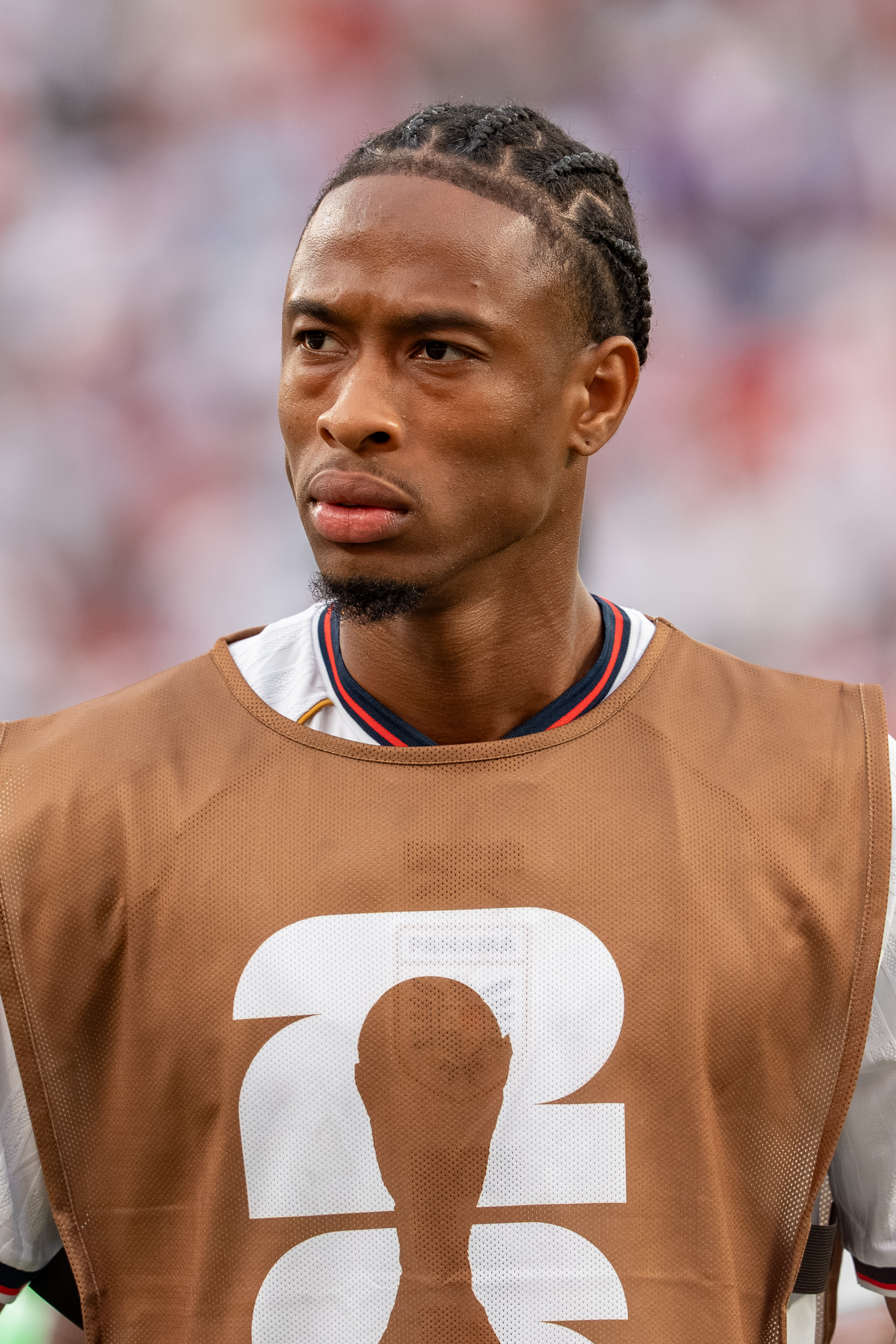
- Fariña with Panama in 2026

Personal information
- Full name: Edgardo Isaac Fariña Wynter
- Date of birth: 19 October 2001 (age 25)
- Place of birth: Panama City, Panama
- Height: 1.94 m (6 ft 4 in)
- Position: Centre-back

Team information
- Current team: Nizhny Novgorod
- Number: 24

Youth career
- Río Abajo
- Plaza Amador

Senior career*
Years	Team	Apps	(Gls)
2020–2021	Atlético Nacional		
2021–2024	CAI	7	(0)
2022–2023	→ Universitario (loan)	26	(1)
2023–2024	→ Municipal (loan)	27	(0)
2024–2025	Khimki	14	(3)
2025–	Nizhny Novgorod	14	(0)

International career^{‡}
2022–	Panama U23	8	(0)
2022–	Panama	18	(0)
- * Club domestic league appearances and goals as of 17 May 2026 ‡ National team caps and goals as of 6 June 2026

Edgardo Issac Fariña Wynter (born 19 October 2001) is a Panamanian professional footballer who plays as a centre-back for Russian First League club Nizhny Novgorod and the Panama national team.

== Club career ==
Born in Panama City, Fariña represented Río Abajo and Plaza Amador before making his senior debut with Segunda División side Atlético Nacional in 2020. In August 2021, he moved to CAI, where he would feature rarely.

On 12 July 2022, Fariña was loaned to Universitario for one year. After featuring regularly, he moved abroad on 14 June 2023, joining Guatemalan side Municipal also in a temporary deal.

On 31 July 2024, Fariña signed with Khimki in the Russian Premier League.

On 24 July 2025, Fariña joined Pari Nizhny Novgorod on a three-year contract.

== International career ==
After appearing with Panama under-23s in the 2022 Maurice Revello Tournament, Fariña received his first call up with the full side in March 2023, for a friendly against Guatemala. He made his full international debut on 12 March, starting in the 1–1 draw at the PayPal Park in San Jose, California.

In June 2024, he was included in the list of Panamanian players selected by Thomas Christiansen to participate in the 2024 Copa América.

== Career statistics ==
=== Club ===
As of match played 17 May 2026

Appearances and goals by club, season and competition
Club	Season	League			Cup		Continental		Total	
Club	Season	Division	Apps	Goals	Apps	Goals	Apps	Goals	Apps	Goals
CAI	2021	Liga Panameña de Fútbol	4	0	0	0	2 (Note: Appearances in Copa Libertadores)	0	6	0
CAI	2022	Liga Panameña de Fútbol	3	0	0	0	—		3	0
CAI	Total		7	0	0	0	2	0	9	0
Universitario (loan)	2022	Liga Panameña de Fútbol	16	1	0	0	—		16	1
Universitario (loan)	2023	Liga Panameña de Fútbol	10	0	0	0	—		10	0
Universitario (loan)	Total		26	1	0	0	—		26	1
Municipal (loan)	2023–24	Liga Nacional Guatemala	27	0	0	0	—		27	0
Khimki	2024–25	Russian Premier League	14	3	3	0	—		17	3
Pari Nizhny Novgorod	2025–26	Russian Premier League	14	0	4	0	—		18	0
Career total			88	4	7	0	2	0	97	4

=== International ===
As of match played 6 June 2026

Appearances and goals by national team and year
National team	Year	Apps	Goals
Panama	2023	2	0
Panama	2024	8	0
Panama	2025	5	0
Panama	2026	3	0
Total		18	0

== Honours ==
Municipal

- Liga Nacional de Guatemala: Clausura 2024

Panama

- CONCACAF Nations League runner-up: 2024–25
