= 2013 Copa Rommel Fernández =

Copa Rommel Fernández
- Season: 2013

The Copa Rommel Fernández 2013 season (officially "XVII Copa Rommel Fernández") starts on November 17, 2013.

== 2013 teams ==
=== Zone 1 ===
- Panama East Panama West Colon Darien

| Club | City | Qualified as |
|---|---|---|
| CD Pan de Azúcar | San Miguelito | LNA Relegated |
| San Joaquin FC | Pedregal | East Panamá 1 |
| San Martin | San Martin | East Panamá 2 |
| Atlético Darién | Darién | Darién 1 |
| Garachine FC | Garachiné, Darién | Darién 2 |
| Bambu FC | Colón | Colón 1 |
| Olympic FC | Colón | Colón 2 |
| Promesas de Dios | Puerto Caimito | Panamá West 1 |
| UDELAS-Paraná | Bejuco | Panamá West 2 |

=== Zone 2 ===
- Cocle Herrera Los Santos Veraguas

| Club | City | Qualified as |
|---|---|---|
| Atlético Don Bosco | | Herrera 1 |
| Los Milagros FC | Chitré | Herrera 2 |
| Prado FC | | Veraguas 1 |
| Atl.Don Bosco Veraguas | - | Veraguas 2 |
| Atlético Penonomé | Penonomé | Coclé 1 |
| Cosmos FC | Antón, Coclé | Coclé 2 |
| Niupy FC | Macaracas | Los Santos 1 |
| Las Tablas FC | Las Tablas, Los Santos | Los Santos 2 |
| La Mesa | Veraguas | 2012-13 Runner-up |

=== Zone 3 ===
- Chiriquí East Chiriquí West Bocas del Toro

| Club | City | Qualified as |
|---|---|---|
| Solano FC | Bugaba | Chiriquí East 1 |
| River Plate | San Cristobal David | Chiriquí East 2 |
| Deportivo Junior | - | Chiriquí West 1 |
| El Palmar FC | - | Chiriquí West 2 |

=== Final Game ===
16 February 2014
16:00 UTC-5

| River Plate David | 1 (4) – 1 (2) | Promesa de Dios Pto.Caimito |
|---|---|---|
| Rodny Olmos 58' | Report | Alfin Valdés 84' |

Cancha de Entrenamiento Luis Tapia, Panama City
Attendance: 300
