= 2008 Primera A =

Liga Nacional de Ascenso
- Season: 2008
- Champions: Río Abajo F.C.

Primera A 2008 team distribution

The Primera A 2008 season (officially "Torneo Primera A 2008") started on February 23, 2008. The Apertura champions was Orión and the Clausura champion was Río Abajo F.C. On November 15, 2008 a grand final was played and Río Abajo were crowned champions after defeating 2–1 Orión. However Río Abajo lost the promotion play-off against Plaza Amador in a 3–2 aggregate score, thus failing to promote to ANAPROF.

== Changes for 2008 ==
- The league is once again separated into Apertura and Clausura.
- The Primera A champion will play a playoff for promotion with the last team in the ANAPROF general standings instead of being promoted directly.
- There will be no relegation during this season.
- The Apertura and Clausura winners will play a match in order to decide an overall champion who would play the playoff for promotion to ANAPROF. This playoff between the Apertura and Clausura champions is the same as the Grand Championship format used previously in ANAPROF and Primera A.
- Club Deportivo Policía Nacional renamed themselves during mid-season to Sociedad Deportiva Atlético Nacional.

== Primera A 2008 teams ==
Club	City	Stadium
Atlético Nacional	Panama City	Estadio Kobee
Chorrillito	Arraiján	Campo de Campana
C.A.I.	La Chorrera	Ciudad del Niño Valdes
Génesis	Panama City	Estadio Balboa
Orión	San Miguelito	Estadio Bernardo Gil
Pan de Azúcar	San Miguelito	Campo de la UTP
Paraíso	San Miguelito	Estadio Bernardo Gil
Río Abajo	Panama City	Estadio Balboa

== Primera A Apertura 2008 ==
=== Apertura 2008 Standings ===
Place (Posición)	Team (Equipo)	Played (PJ)	Won (PG)	Draw (PE)	Lost (PP)	Goals Scored (GF)	Goals Conceded (GC)	+/- (Dif.)	Points (Pts.)
1.	Río Abajo F.C.	14	10	1	3	41	19	+22	31
2.	Orión	14	9	1	4	30	17	+13	28
3.	Paraíso	14	7	3	4	28	24	+4	24
4.	Chorrillito	14	7	2	5	32	24	+8	23
5.	Atlético Nacional	14	6	3	5	28	31	-3	21
6.	Pan de Azúcar	14	6	1	7	22	34	-12	19
7.	C.A.I.	14	3	1	10	20	31	-11	10
8.	Génesis	14	3	0	11	15	35	-20	9

Green indicates Semifinal Berth

=== Apertura 2008 Results table ===
Home \ Away	CHO	CAI	GÉN	ORI	PAN	ATL	PAR	RÍO
Chorrillito	—	1–4	6–0	2–1	2–0	2–3	2–1	1–3
C.A.I.	1–1	—	0–3	0–1	2–3	2–0	1–2	1–3
Génesis	1–3	0–5	—	0–1	1–3	1–0	[*]	1–2
Orión	1–0	2–0	3–2	—	0–1	1–1	3–4	4–1
Pan de Azúcar	1–4	3–1	3–2	0–4	—	1–2	1–2	1–3
Atlético Nacional	0–7	5–1	3–2	2–3	2–2	—	3–1	4–3
Paraiso	2–2	2–1	0–1	3–6	6–2	2–2	—	1–1
Río Abajo	6–0	5–1	6–1	1–0	3–1	3–1	1–2	—

Legend: Blue = home team win; Yellow = draw; Red = away team win.
- [*] The score is unknown, but it was reported as a win for Paraiso F.C.

== Final round ==
Semifinals (agg)
Río Abajo F.C.	8
Chorrillito	9
Orion	5
Paraíso	1

Final
Chorrillito	2
Orion	3

=== Semifinals 1st leg ===
June 3, 2008

Río Abajo F.C.	5–4	Chorrillito

Ciudad del Niño Valdes

May 30, 2008

Orion	1–1	Paraíso

Estadio Bernardo Gil

=== Semifinals 2nd leg ===
June 7, 2008

Chorrillito	5–3	Río Abajo F.C.

Estadio Bernardo Gil

June 1, 2008

Paraíso	0–4	Orion

Estadio Bernardo Gil

=== Final ===
June 13, 2008

Chorrillito	2–3	Orión

Estadio Bernardo Gil

Apertura 2008 Champion:
Orión

== Primera A Clausura 2008 ==
=== Clausura 2008 standings ===
Place (Posición)	Team (Equipo)	Played (PJ)	Won (PG)	Draw (PE)	Lost (PP)	Goals Scored (GF)	Goals Conceded (GC)	+/- (Dif.)	Points (Pts.)
1.	Orión	14	9	2	3	52	21	+31	29
2.	Río Abajo F.C.	14	8	3	3	39	20	+19	27
3.	Pan de Azúcar	14	7	5	2	30	15	+15	25
4.	Chorrillito	14	6	3	5	30	26	+4	21
5.	Paraíso	14	6	3	5	25	25	0	21
6.	Atlético Nacional	14	4	6	4	27	19	+8	18
7.	Génesis	14	2	3	9	17	58	-41	9
8.	C.A.I.	14	0	3	11	15	50	-35	3

Green indicates Semifinal Berth (Los equipos en verde señalan los clasificados a semifinales).

=== Clausura 2008 results table ===
Home \ Away	CHO	CAI	GÉN	ORI	PAN	ATL	PAR	RÍO
Chorrillito	—	5–1	3–2	2–1	1–2	0–3	1–1	1–1
C.A.I.	2–4	—	3–3	0–6	0–4	2–3	1–1	0–5
Génesis	0–2	2–1	—	3–3	1–5	2–1	0–4	0–9
Orión	3–1	6–1	9–1	—	3–0	1–0	2–1	2–3
Pan de Azúcar	4–2	4–1	0–0	2–2	—	1–1	3–0*	4–2
Atlético Nacional	1–1	1–1	11–2	1–4	1–1	—	1–1	1–1
Paraíso	0–3**	3–0	7–1	1–8	1–0	2–1	—	3–2
Río Abajo	5–4	3–2	1–0	5–2	0–0	0–1	2–0	—

Legend: Blue = home team win; Yellow = draw; Red = away team win.
- [*] Awarded 3–0 to Pan de Azúcar by ANAPROF because Paraíso failed the league's regulation by not bringing their away kit, thus since both teams' home kit was white the game had to be suspended.
- [**] Originally 3–1 victory for Paraíso but awarded to Chorrillito.

== Final round ==
Semifinals (agg)
Orión	2
Chorrillito	3
Río Abajo F.C.	8
Pan de Azúcar	0

Final
Chorrillito	0
Río Abajo F.C.	2

=== Semifinals 1st leg ===
October 25, 2008

Chorrillito	2–1	Orión
Mario Cox; Aristides Ortega		Roberty Morales

Campo de Campana

October 25, 2008

Pan de Azúcar	0–2	Río Abajo F.C.
		Eladio Carranza 70'; Eduardo Valerezco 80'

Estadio Balboa

=== Semifinals 2nd leg ===
November 1, 2008

Río Abajo F.C.	6–0	Pan de Azúcar

Albrook Field

November 1, 2008

Orion	1–1	Chorrillito

Estadio Bernardo Gil

=== Final ===
November 7, 2008

Río Abajo F.C.	2–0	Chorrillito
Jefferson Vivero 75' 90'

Estadio Bernardo Gil

Clausura 2008 Champion:
Río Abajo F.C.

== Primera A 2008 Grand Final ==
Club	Champion
Orión	Primera A 2008 Apertura Champion
Río Abajo F.C.	Primera A 2008 Clausura Champion

=== Final ===
November 15, 2008

Orión	1-2	Río Abajo F.C.
Jose Ruiz 14'		Joshua Bailey 18'; Jefferson Vivero 27'

Estadio Bernardo Gil

Primera A 2008 Champion:
Río Abajo
1st Title

== Promotion playoff ==
Team 1	Agg.	Team 2	1st leg	2nd leg
Plaza Amador	3–2	Río Abajo F.C.	2–2	1–0

Río Abajo remain in Primera A

=== 1st leg ===
November 21, 2008

Plaza Amador	2–2	Río Abajo F.C.
Luis Olivardia 24' 37'		Hector de la Cruz 8'; Aramis Haywood 83'

Estadio Bernardo Gil

=== 2nd leg ===
December 6, 2008

Río Abajo F.C.	0–1	Plaza Amador
		Nestor Murillo 56'

Estadio Balboa
