= Anton =

Anton may refer to:

== People ==
- Anton (given name), a list of people with the given name
- Anton (surname), a list of people with the surname

== Places ==
- Anton Municipality, Bulgaria
  - Anton, Sofia Province, a village
- Antón District, Panama
  - Antón, a town and capital of the district
- Anton, Colorado, an unincorporated town
- Anton, Texas, a city
- Anton, Wisconsin, an unincorporated community
- River Anton, Hampshire, United Kingdom

== Other uses ==
- Case Anton, codename for the German and Italian occupation of Vichy France in 1942
- Anton (computer), a highly parallel supercomputer for molecular dynamics simulations
- Anton (1973 film), a Norwegian film
- Anton (2008 film), an Irish film
- Anton Cup, the championship trophy of the Swedish junior hockey league J20 SuperElit
- Dynamite Anton, the main protagonist in the 2024 video game Antonblast
