= S.D. Panamá Oeste =

Panamanian football club

- Full name: Sociedad Deportiva Panamá Oeste
- Ground: Estadio Agustín Sánchez; La Chorrera, Panamá Oeste
- Capacity: 3000
- Chairman: Armando Carreiro
- Manager: Lorenzo Mambrini
- League: Liga Prom
Home colours

Sociedad Deportiva Panamá Oeste is a Panamanian football team playing at the Liga Prom.

It is based in Capira. Until 2011, the team was known as Chorrillito Fútbol Club de Arraiján.

== History ==
=== Chorrillito F.C. ===
Chorrillito's crest

In 2007 Chorrillito promoted to the Liga Nacional de Ascenso after defeating Five Star 4–2 in the Copa Rommel Fernández final. In its first season in the Liga Nacional de Ascenso in 2008, Chorrillito managed to reach both the Apertura and Clausura finals but lost in both cases against Orión and Río Abajo respectively.

=== S.D. Panamá Oeste ===
For the Clausura championship of the 2010-11 Liga Nacional de Ascenso season Chorrillito changed its name to Sociedad Deportiva Panamá Oeste. In that season they reached the quarterfinal stage of the championship after finishing 3rd in their group (Group B), however they were defeated by SUNTRACS on a 3–0 aggregate score.

On June 14, 2023 it was announced on Twitter that the team was renamed as Academia Costa del Este and would also affect the U-18 team, the feminine team that plays at LFF (panamanian feminine top league) won't be affected.

== Honours ==
- Copa Rommel Fernández
  - Champions (1): 2007

== Year-by-year results ==
=== Liga Nacional de Ascenso ===
Season	Position	League Record								Play-offs	Aggregate pos.	Notes
		P	W	T	L	F	A	+/-	Pts			
2008 (A)	2/8	17	8	2	7	43	35	+8	26	Runner-up		
2008 (C)	2/8	17	7	4	6	33	30	+3	25	Runner-up		
2009 (A) I	5/10	18	10	1	7	35	36	−1	31	Did not qualify		
2009 (A) II	5/10	18	10	1	7	37	24	+13	31	Did not qualify		
