= Nahil Carroll =

Panamanian footballer (born 1983)

Personal information
- Date of birth: September 9, 1983 (age 43)
- Place of birth: Panama City, Panama
- Height: 1.66 m (5 ft 5 1/2 in)
- Position: Right back

Team information
- Current team: Tauro

Youth career
- Atlético Nacional

Senior career*
Years	Team	Apps	(Gls)
2004–2006	Sporting SM	60	(8)
2006–2011	Árabe Unido	97	(9)
2011–2012	Sporting SM		
2012	Plaza Amador	10	(0)
2013	Río Abajo	13	(0)
2013	Plaza Amador	12	(0)
2014	Río Abajo	17	(0)
2014	Tauro	3	(0)
2015	Alianza		
2015–	Atlético Nacional		

International career^{‡}
2014–	Panama	3	(0)
- * Club domestic league appearances and goals as of 3 June 2014 ‡ National team caps and goals as of 3 June 2015

Nahil Carroll (born 9 September 1983) is a football defender who currently plays in Panama for the LPF team, Atlético Nacional.

== Club career ==
Carroll joined Sporting San Miguelito from Árabe Unido in May 2011. In December 2012, he moved from Plaza Amador to newly promoted Río Abajo and he made the same switch a year later. After a season at Tauro, he joined Alianza in December 2014.

In June 2015 he clinched promotion to the LPF after his team Atlético Nacional won the Panamanian Second Division championship decider against SUNTRACS.

== International career ==
He made his debut for Panama in May 2014 friendly match against Serbia and has, as of 1 June 2015, earned a total of 3 caps, scoring no goals.

== Honors ==
=== Club ===
- Liga Panameña de Fútbol (1): 2008 (C)
- Liga Panameña de Fútbol: Apertura 2009 II
