= A.D. América =

Panamanian football club

América de Bugaba
- Full name: Asociación Deportiva América
- Nickname(s): Ultraroja
- Founded: September 22, 2000
- Ground: Estadio Vitelio Ortega; Divalá, Alanje District
- Capacity: 350
- Chairman: (Panama) Adolfo Fuentes
- Manager: (Panama) Javier Aguirre
Home colours	Away colours

Asociación Deportiva América is a Panamanian football team.

It was founded on September 22, 2000 and is based in Bugaba. They have played in the 2009 Panamanian Third Division.

== Stadium ==
Their home stadium is Estadio Vitelio Ortega, which is located in Divalá, Alanje District.
