= Sport West FC =

Panamanian football club

- Full name: Sport West FC
- Nickname(s): La Furia del Oeste
- Founded: 2007 as Deportivo el Tecal; 2012 as C.D. Vista Alegre; 2016 as Sports West FC
- Ground: Cancha de Mystic; Arraiján, Panama
- Chairman: Leovaldo Zurita
- Manager: Carlos Alonso
- League: Liga Distritorial de Fútbol de Arraiján
Home colours	Away colours

Sport West FC also known as Club Deportivo Vista Alegre is a Panamanian football team, for several seasons played at second tier championships and currently playing at amateur level after being disaffiliated in 2017.

They are based in Vista Alegre, Arraiján, but usually play their home games at the Estadio Agustín Sánchez in La Chorrera.

== History ==
=== Deportivo El Tecal ===
The team was known as Deportivo El Tecal from Vacamonte and was promoted to the Liga Nacional de Ascenso (LNA) as part of the league's expansion for the 2009 season as runner-up of the 2009 season of the Copa Rommel Fernández (which they lost 5–4 to Millenium). They won their first match of the LNA 4–0 against Deportivo Génesis on 30 August 2009.

=== Deportivo Vista Alegre ===
For the 2013–14 season the team was renamed to Club Deportivo Vista Alegre. The club is a joint effort of the community and church to help the local youth and the chairman is former pastor Leovaldo Zurita.

=== Sport West FC ===
For the 2016 season the team name was changed again to Sport West FC; besides finishing 9th on Ascenso LPF Apertura 2017, the team wasn't allowed to participate for the Ascenso LPF Clausura 2017 season, since they did not comply with the necessary documentation and regulations from FIFA, as well as by CONCACAF to compete as a professional football team, and was sent to local district amateur football league level. Also Panamá Viejo FC and New York FC teams were affected by the same resolution.

== Year-by-year results ==
=== Liga Nacional de Ascenso ===
Season	Position	League Record								Playoffs	Aggregate pos.	Notes
		P	W	T	L	F	A	+/-	Pts			
2009 (A) I	9/10	18	4	2	12	19	48	−29	14	Did not qualify		
2009 (A) II	9/10	18	4	5	9	33	46	−13	17	Did not qualify		
2013 (A)	7/7	12	1	3	8	9	31	−22	6	Did not qualify		Group B
