= Anthony Basile =

Panamanian footballer (born 1980)

Personal information
- Full name: Anthony Saul Basile Delgado
- Date of birth: September 23, 1980 (age 46)
- Place of birth: Panama
- Height: 1.69 m (5 ft 6 1/2 in)
- Position: Forward

Team information
- Current team: Atlético Nacional

Senior career*
Years	Team	Apps	(Gls)
2004	Sporting de Coclé		
2004	Huracán Buceo		
2005	Centauros		
2005	Chorillo		
2006	Cortuluá		
2007	Sporting'89		
2008	Árabe Unido		
2010	Plaza Amador	8	(0)
2010	Chepo	14	(4)
2011	Once Municipal	16	(2)
2011	Chepo		
2012	Once Municipal		
2012–2013	Río Abajo	36	(13)
2013	Sporting San Miguelito	12	(2)
2014	Río Abajo	20	(5)
2014	Chorrillo		
2015–2016	Atlético Nacional		

International career^{‡}
2005	Panama	3	(0)
- * Club domestic league appearances and goals as of 8 February 2011 ‡ National team caps and goals as of 8 February 2011

Anthony Saul Basile Delgado (born September 23, 1980) is a professional football forward who currently plays for Atlético Nacional.

== Club career ==
Basile has played in the Uruguayan and Colombian second divisions and played alongside compatriot Román Torres at Colombian side Cortuluá in January 2006.

In January 2012 he joined Salvadoran side Once Municipal.

In summer 2014 Basile switched Río Abajo for Chorillo.

== Honors ==
Club

- ANAPROF (2): 2007 (A), 2008 (A)

== International career ==
Basile has made 3 appearances for Panama in 2005 two of them in FIFA World Cup qualification and one in a friendly against Bahrain.
