= Francisco Vence =

Panamanian footballer (born 1992)

Personal information
- Full name: Francisco Javier Vence Gómez
- Date of birth: 11 April 1992 (age 34)
- Place of birth: Panama City, Panama
- Height: 1.76 m (5 ft 9 in)
- Position: Left back

Youth career
- Chorrillo

Senior career*
Years	Team	Apps	(Gls)
2010–2018	Chorrillo	113	(3)
2015–2016	→ Atlético Nacional (loan)	23	(0)
2018–2020	CAI La Chorrera	50	(1)
2021	Deportivo Lara	0	(0)

International career^{‡}
- Panama U20
2021–	Panama	1	(0)
- * Club domestic league appearances and goals as of 20 December 2020 ‡ National team caps and goals as of 28 January 2021

Francisco Javier Vence Gómez (born 11 April 1992) is a Panamanian footballer who plays as a left back for the Panama national team.

== Club career ==
Vence was born in Panama City, and played for local sides Chorrillo, Atlético Nacional and CAI La Chorrera. On 8 February 2021, he moved abroad and joined Venezuelan Primera División club Deportivo Lara, but left the club after two months and without debuting.

== International career ==
Vence represented Panama at under-20 level before making his full international debut on 28 January 2021, starting in a 0–0 friendly home draw against Serbia.
