= Primera A =

Primera A may refer to:

- Colombian Primera A, Colombia
- Serie A de Ecuador, Ecuador
- Liga de Expansión MX or Primera División A, Mexico
- Liga Nacional de Ascenso or Primera A, Panama
