= Tierra Firme F.C. =

Panamanian football club

Tierra Firme
- Full name: Tierra Firme Fútbol Club
- Founded: 1985
- Ground: Cancha de Entrenamiento Luis Tapia; Panama City, Panamá
- Capacity: 800
- League: Copa Rommel Fernández
- -: -
Home colours

Tierra Firme Fútbol Club is a Panamanian football team playing at Liga Nacional de Ascenso. It is based in San Miguelito and it was founded in 1985. Up until 2011, the team played under the name of Paraíso Fútbol Club.

== History ==
=== Paraíso F.C. ===
Paraíso's Crest

In 2007 Paraíso earned a spot in the Liga Nacional de Ascenso after being crowned champions of the 2007 edition of the Copa Rommel Fernández. In their 3 1/2 seasons in the Liga Nacional de Ascenso, Paraíso had a positive run after reaching the second round of competition in every championship with the exception of the 2008 Clausura edition which they failed to do so due to goal differential. In the second round of competition, Paraíso was defeated in semifinals twice by Orión (2008 (A) and 2009 (A) II) and once by Río Abajo (2009 (A) I), and in the quarterfinals stage once by Atlético Nacional (2010 (A)).

=== Tierra Firme F.C. ===
For the Clausura championship of the 2010-11 Liga Nacional de Ascenso season Paraíso changed its name to Tierra Firme Fútbol Club. In that season they failed to qualify to the quarterfinal stage of the championship after finishing 5th in their group (Group A).

== Honours ==
- Copa Rommel Fernández: 1

2007

== Year-by-year results ==
=== Liga Nacional de Ascenso ===
Season	Position	League Record								Play-offs	Aggregate pos.	Notes
		P	W	T	L	F	A	+/-	Pts			
2008 (A)	3/8	16	7	4	5	29	29	0	25	Semi-Finals		Score against Génesis fixture is unknown but a win was reported to Paraíso
2008 (C)	5/8	14	6	3	5	25	25	0	21	Could not qualify		Did not qualify because of goal differential
2009 (A) I	4/10	20	10	5	5	47	33	+14	35	Semi-Finals		
2009 (A) II	3/10	20	11	4	5	44	28	+16	37	Semi-Finals		
