= Santa Rita, Coclé =

Coordinates: 8.4964°N 80.1861°W

Santa Rita
- Corregimiento
- Location within Panama
- Country: Panama
- Province: Coclé
- District: Antón

Area
  - Land: 43.5 km^{2} (16.8 sq mi)

Population (2010)
  - Total: 2,562
  - Density: 58.9/km^{2} (153/sq mi)
- Population density calculated based on land area.
- Time zone: UTC−5 (EST)

Santa Rita is a corregimiento in Antón District, Coclé Province, Panama. It has a land area of 43.5 square kilometres (16.8 sq mi) and had a population of 2,562 as of 2010, giving it a population density of 58.9 inhabitants per square kilometre (153/sq mi). Its population as of 1990 was 2,065; its population as of 2000 was 2,368.
