= Cabuya, Coclé =

Coordinates: 8.5500°N 80.1667°W

Cabuya
- Corregimiento
- Location within Panama
- Country: Panama
- Province: Coclé
- District: Antón

Area
  - Land: 60.6 km^{2} (23.4 sq mi)

Population (2010)
  - Total: 2,119
  - Density: 35/km^{2} (91/sq mi)
- Population density calculated based on land area.
- Time zone: UTC−5 (EST)

Cabuya is a corregimiento in Antón District, Coclé Province, Panama. It has a land area of 60.6 square kilometres (23.4 sq mi) and had a population of 2,119 as of 2010, giving it a population density of 35 inhabitants per square kilometre (91/sq mi). Its population as of 1990 was 1,852; its population as of 2000 was 2,060.
