= International School of Panama =

Location
- Golf Club Road Cerro Viento Rural San Miguelito Panama City, Panama; San Miguelito; Panama; 9.0778°N 79.4718°W

Information
- Type: K-12 school
- Grades: K-12
- Website: isp.edu.pa

International School of Panama (ISP) is an international school in San Miguelito District, Panama Province, Panama. It serves grades Pre-Kindergarten through 12. The school was founded in 1982.

The International School of Panama is a not-for-profit educational institution with all its income from tuition and fees reinvested in the school’s programs and infrastructure. Annual tuition rates for the 2019-2020 school year are as follows: PK3: US$9,424; PK4 – grade 5: US$14,111; grades 6-8: US$15,479; and grades 9-12: US$17,502. The school charges a one-time capital donation of US$16,000 and additional fees for registration and special programs, such as the International Baccalaureate.
