= Juan Díaz, Coclé =

Coordinates: 8.4667°N 80.2833°W

Juan Díaz
- Corregimiento
- Location within Panama
- Country: Panama
- Province: Coclé
- District: Antón

Area
  - Land: 85.6 km^{2} (33.1 sq mi)

Population (2010)
  - Total: 2,634
  - Density: 30.8/km^{2} (80/sq mi)
- Population density calculated based on land area.
- Time zone: UTC−5 (EST)

Juan Díaz is a corregimiento in Antón District, Coclé Province, Panama. It has a land area of 85.6 square kilometres (33.1 sq mi) and had a population of 2,634 as of 2010, giving it a population density of 30.8 inhabitants per square kilometre (80/sq mi). Its population as of 1990 was 1,694; its population as of 2000 was 2,037.
