= Omar Torrijos, Panama =

Omar Torrijos
- Corregimiento
- Location within Panama
- Country: Panama
- Province: Panamá
- District: San Miguelito
- Established: June 27, 2000

Area
  - Land: 11.1 km^{2} (4.3 sq mi)

Population (2010)
  - Total: 36,452
  - Density: 3,297.8/km^{2} (8,541/sq mi)
- Population density calculated based on land area.
- Time zone: UTC−5 (EST)

Omar Torrijos is a corregimiento in San Miguelito District, Panamá Province, Panama with a population of 36,452 as of 2010. It was created by Law 21 of June 27, 2000. Its population as of 2000 was 37,650.
