= El Retiro, Coclé =

Coordinates: 8.4833°N 80.1500°W

El Retiro
- Corregimiento
- Location within Panama
- Country: Panama
- Province: Coclé
- District: Antón

Area
  - Land: 66.1 km^{2} (25.5 sq mi)

Population (2010)
  - Total: 2,303
  - Density: 34.8/km^{2} (90/sq mi)
- Population density calculated based on land area.
- Time zone: UTC−5 (EST)

El Retiro is a corregimiento in Antón District, Coclé Province, Panama. It has a land area of 66.1 square kilometres (25.5 sq mi) and had a population of 2,303 as of 2010, giving it a population density of 34.8 inhabitants per square kilometre (90/sq mi). Its population as of 1990 was 1,801; its population as of 2000 was 1,998.
