= Amelia Denis de Icaza (corregimiento) =

- Corregimiento
- Interactive map of Amelia Denis de Icaza
- Location within Panama
- Coordinates: 9°02′28″N 79°31′36″W
- Country: Panama
- Province: Panamá
- District: San Miguelito

Area
  - Land: 3.8 km^{2} (1.5 sq mi)

Population (2010)
  - Total: 38,397
  - Density: 10,096.8/km^{2} (26,151/sq mi)
- Population density calculated based on land area.
- Time zone: UTC−5 (EST)

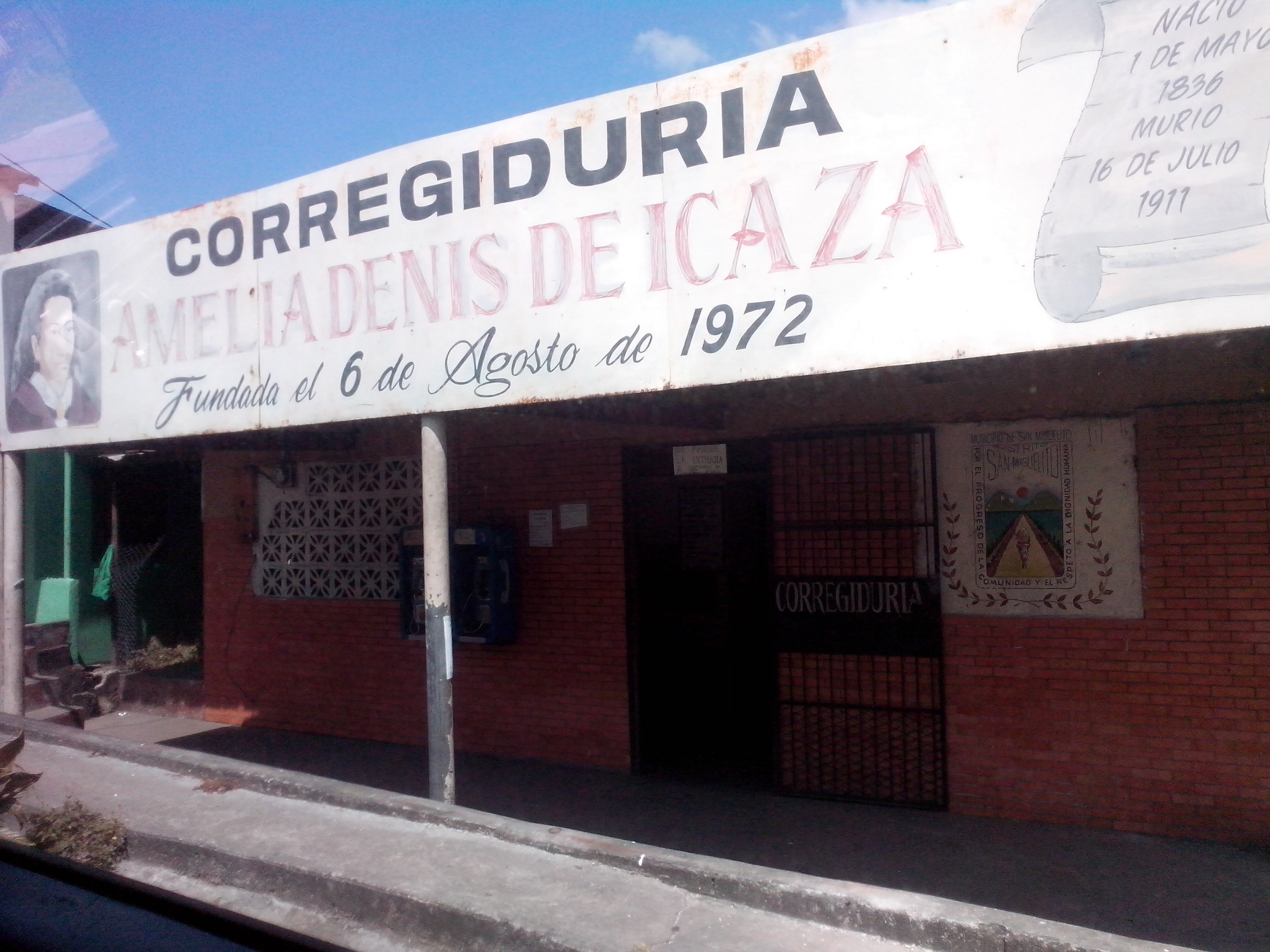

Amelia Denis de Icaza is a corregimiento in San Miguelito District, Panamá Province, Panama with a population of 38,397 as of 2010. Its population as of 1990 was 33,901; its population as of 2000 was 38,522.
