= Belisario Frías =

- Corregimiento
- Location within Panama
- Coordinates: 9.0769°N 79.4996°W
- Country: Panama
- Province: Panamá
- District: San Miguelito
- Established: June 27, 2000

Area
  - Land: 4.3 km^{2} (1.7 sq mi)

Population (2010)
  - Total: 44,571
  - Density: 10,359.1/km^{2} (26,830/sq mi)
- Population density calculated based on land area.
- Time zone: UTC−5 (EST)

Belisario Frías is a corregimiento in San Miguelito District, Panamá Province, Panama with a population of 44,571 as of 2010. It was created by Law 21 of June 27, 2000. Its population as of 2000 was 46,794.
