= Arnulfo Arias, Panama =

Arnulfo Arias
- Corregimiento
- Location within Panama
- Coordinates: 9.0662719°N 79.4902039°W
- Country: Panama
- Province: Panamá
- District: San Miguelito
- Established: June 27, 2000

Area
  - Land: 7.3 km^{2} (2.8 sq mi)

Population (2010)
  - Total: 31,650
  - Density: 4,356/km^{2} (11,280/sq mi)
- Population density calculated based on land area.
- Time zone: UTC−5 (EST)

Arnulfo Arias is a corregimiento in San Miguelito District, Panamá Province, Panama with a population of 31,650 as of 2010. It was created by Law 21 of June 27, 2000. Its population as of 2000 was 30,502.
