= Copa Rommel Fernández =

- Founded: 1996
- Country: Panama
- Confederation: CONCACAF
- Number of clubs: 20
- Level on pyramid: 3
- Promotion to: Liga Nacional de Ascenso
- Relegation to: Local district leagues
- Current champions: River Plate David
- Website: Fepafut
- Current: Copa Rommel Fernández 2018

The Copa Rommel Fernández is the third level of Panama's national club championship. It was founded in 1996 and it is a seasonal tournament that lasts 2 months in which the champion is promoted to Liga Nacional de Ascenso. The tournament is named after Panamanian football legend Rommel Fernández. The tournament is presided by Lucas Fernández and managed by Panamanian Football Federation.

Since the championship is seasonal only, at the end of each competition each of the teams (except the champions) are relegated to their respective district leagues where they compete to earn a spot for the following season. Additionally, the team relegated from the Liga Nacional de Ascenso automatically holds a spot to compete in the Copa Rommel Fernández after the end of the second division championship.

== Format ==
The tournament is divided into three zones which include the qualified teams from each respective provincial tournaments (see below) plus previous season Liga Nacional de Ascenso relegated team. Each province is represented by two teams except Chiriquí which is represented by four teams and Panamá with ten teams. Each team plays a single game against the other teams from their same zone, the two teams with most points in their respective zones will qualify to the final round. The eight qualified teams play a knock out stage which starts with rounds of 16 and finishes with a two team final. The champion gains promotion to the Liga Nacional de Ascenso held that same year.

=== Qualification ===
In order to gain the right to play in this tournament each team has to first participate in their respective district leagues. The winners of each district league will later move on a provincial tournament. The champion and the runner-up of the provincial tournaments obtain the right to represent their province in the Copa Rommel Fernández held the following year.

== Past Champions & Runners-up ==
Year	Winner	Score	Runner-up
1996; Details	N/A		N/A
1997; Details	La Primavera (Veraguas)		N/A
1998; Details	Solano FC	2–2; 5–2**	Inter de Guabito
1999–2000; Details	C.A.I.	3–1	Zona Libre FC (Changuinola)
2000–01; Details	Orión (San Miguelito)	3–1	Vista Hermosa (Penonomé)
2002; Details	River Plate de Colón	1–0	Río Abajo
2003; Details	Boxer FC		Chitre FC
2004; Details	Atalanta Jr.		Chorrillito (Panamá Oeste)
2005–06; Details	Deportivo Génesis (Panamá Este)	5–2	Independiente F.C. (Veracruz)
2006–07; Details	Paraíso FC (San Miguelito)	3–0	Chorrillito (Panamá Oeste)
2007–08; Details	Chorrillito (Panamá Oeste)	4–2	Five Star (Bocas del Toro)
2008–09; Details	Millenium (Barraza)	5–4*	El Tecal (Arraijan)
2009–10; Details	SUNTRACS (San Miguelito)	5–0	Los Pumas (Penonomé)
2010–11; Details	Santa Gema FC (Arraijan)	4–0	Atlético Evolution (Capira)
2011–12; Details	Santos FC (La Chorrera)	3–0	AD San Antonio (Penonomé)
2012–13; Details	CD Centenario (Panamá Este)	2–1*	La Mesa FC (Veraguas)
2013–14; Details	Club River Plate (David)	1–1; 4–2**	Promesa de Dios (Pto. Caimito)
2014–15; Details	Nueva York FC (Colón)	3–2	Deportivo Aroon (La Mesa, Veraguas)
2015–16; Details	Panamá Viejo Fútbol Club	2–0	Club River Plate (David)
2016–17; Details			

- [*] Won after extra time
- [**] Won penalty kick
