= San Juan de Dios =

Corregimiento in Coclé, Panama

Coordinates: 8.4688°N 80.2833°W

- Corregimiento
- Location within Panama
- Country: Panama
- Province: Coclé
- District: Antón

Area
  - Land: 55.7 km^{2} (21.5 sq mi)

Population (2010)
  - Total: 4,797
  - Density: 86.1/km^{2} (223/sq mi)
- Population density calculated based on land area.
- Time zone: UTC−5 (EST)

San Juan de Dios is a corregimiento in Antón District, Coclé Province, Panama. It has a land area of 55.7 square kilometres (21.5 sq mi) and had a population of 4,797 it 2010, giving it a population density of 86.1 per square kilometre (223/sq mi). The population in 1990 was 6,199 and in 2000 was 4,214.
