= Estadio Bernardo Gil =

Football stadium in San Miguelito, Panamá

Coordinates: 9°01′50″N 79°29′54″W

- Candela
- Interactive map of Estadio Bernardo Gil
- Former names: Estadio 28 de Diciembre
- Location: San Miguelito, Panamá, Panama
- Owner: San Miguelito district
- Operator: San Miguelito district
- Capacity: 300
- Surface: Artificial turf
- Field size: 98 m × 60 m (322 ft × 197 ft)

Construction
- Opened: 1977
- Renovated: 2007
- Cost: $298,880 (renovation)

Tenants
- Sporting San Miguelito; Chepo F.C. Plaza Amador; Orión; Paraiso F.C.

Estadio Bernardo "Candela" Gil is a football stadium in San Miguelito, Panamá which hosts Liga Panameña de Fútbol team Sporting San Miguelito, Chepo F.C. and Plaza Amador and Primera A teams Orión and Paraiso F.C.

The stadium was formerly known as 'Estadio 28 de Diciembre which had a small 90x57 meter field of mixed sand and gravel, which made it hard for players to compete and therefore could not be used for ANAPROF games. In 2007, in a joint effort from the Panamanian government and the national sport institute (INDE), they were allowed to spend $298,880 in installing artificial turf to the field and increasing its size to 98x60 m. The stadium later was renamed for Bernardo Gil, a pioneer who managed to expropriate the land for use as a football stadium.

The first official game in the renovated stadium was played on Sunday September 23, 2007 when Sporting '89 tied 1-1 with Atlético Chiriquí in the ANAPROF championship. The first goal in the candela was scored by Eladio Mitre of Sporting '89.

== Bernardo Gil ==
The stadium was renamed in order to honor the name of Bernardo "Candela" Gil, a pioneer in San Miguelito's football who managed to expropriate the land where the present stadium lies, and over the years developed the land into a functional stadium for the people of San Miguelito.

The land before the expropriation was used as a "cantina" where locals would go to drink day and night. Seeing the land go to waste, Bernardo Gil and other pioneers fought hard, and even radically to get the land expropriated to the district; he even went to jail numerous times. It was not until Panamanian general Omar Torrijos saw how hard they were fighting for the construction of a football field where the district could practice the sport safely, that he ordered for the land to be expropriated and handed to the district. Later on the stadium was built and opened in 1977.

Bernardo Gil went on to become president of the district league and provisional league; he remained president until his death.
