= Caballero, Coclé =

Coordinates: 8.5500°N 80.2000°W

Caballero
- Corregimiento
- Location within Panama
- Country: Panama
- Province: Coclé
- District: Antón
- Established: July 29, 1998

Area
  - Land: 41.5 km^{2} (16.0 sq mi)

Population (2010)
  - Total: 3,501
  - Density: 84.3/km^{2} (218/sq mi)
- Population density calculated based on land area.
- Time zone: UTC−5 (EST)

Caballero is a corregimiento in Antón District, Coclé Province, Panama. It has a land area of 41.5 square kilometres (16.0 sq mi) and had a population of 3,501 as of 2010, giving it a population density of 84.3 inhabitants per square kilometre (218/sq mi). It was created by Law 58 of July 29, 1998, owing to the Declaration of Unconstitutionality of Law 1 of 1982. Its population as of 2000 was 3,111.
