= San Juan de Dios (Coclé, Panama) =

Coordinates: 8°20′N 81°18′W

The community of San Juan de Dios de Antón, located in the Antón District, Cocle Province in Republic of Panama. Originally it was named San Juan after a river that had the same name, but this was later changed to Santo Patrono.

== San Juan de Dios ==
It has access via a new paved road to El Valle de Antón. It has:

- Creeks and Rivers
- Asphalt road
- Electricity
- Telefónica good sign
- Spa
- Bridge over creek
- Siembros fruit and timber
- Good wind regime

== Communities ==
Neighborhoods include:

- Entradero
- Los Meneses
- 1 and 2 Chorrerita
- Salao
- Los Martinez
- Estancia
- Los Reyes

== Schools ==
The community of San Juan de Dios has two school for its inhabitants:

- IB Primary Entradero
- High School San Juan de Dios

== Culture ==
Celebrations of St John of God:

- Semana Santa
- San Juan de Dios, March 8
- On the cross, May
- Santa Rosa, August 30
