= Victoriano Lorenzo, Panama =

Victoriano Lorenzo
- Corregimiento
- Location within Panama
- Coordinates: 9°02′00″N 79°30′20″W
- Country: Panama
- Province: Panamá
- District: San Miguelito

Area
  - Land: 2 km^{2} (0.77 sq mi)

Population (2010)
  - Total: 15,873
  - Density: 7,924.2/km^{2} (20,524/sq mi)
- Population density calculated based on land area.
- Time zone: UTC−5 (EST)

Victoriano Lorenzo is a corregimiento in San Miguelito District, Panamá Province, Panama with a population of 15,873 as of 2010. Its population as of 1990 was 17,317; its population as of 2000 was 17,328.
