= Belisario Porras, Panama =

Belisario Porras
- Corregimiento
- Location within Panama
- Country: Panama
- Province: Panamá
- District: San Miguelito

Area
  - Land: 4 km^{2} (1.5 sq mi)

Population (2010)
  - Total: 49,367
  - Density: 12,294.1/km^{2} (31,842/sq mi)
- Population density calculated based on land area.
- Time zone: UTC−5 (EST)

Belisario Porras is a corregimiento in San Miguelito District, Panamá Province, Panama with a population of 49,367 as of 2010. Its population as of 1990 was 119,400; its population as of 2000 was 49,802.
