= Río Hato =

- Corregimiento
- Location within Panama
- Coordinates: 8°22′48″N 80°10′12″W
- Country: Panama
- Province: Coclé
- District: Antón

Area
  - Land: 140 km^{2} (54 sq mi)

Population (2010)
  - Total: 15,701
  - Density: 112.1/km^{2} (290/sq mi)
- Population density calculated based on land area.
- Time zone: UTC−5 (EST)
- Climate: Aw

Río Hato is a corregimiento in Antón District, Coclé Province, Panama. It is home to the Río Hato Airport. It has a land area of 140 square kilometres (54 sq mi) and had a population of 15,701 as of 2010, giving it a population density of 112.1 inhabitants per square kilometre (290/sq mi). Its population as of 1990 was 8,888; its population as of 2000 was 10,886.

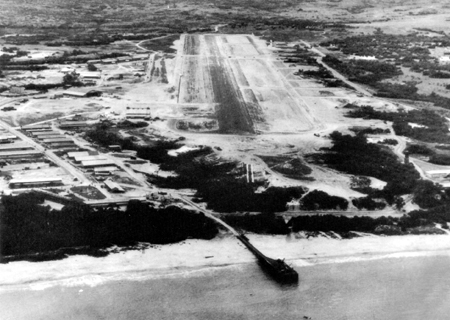
Rio Hato army air base in 1940

It is the site of Scarlett Martínez International Airport, a small international airport primarily used by Canadian leisure airlines.
