= El Chirú =

Coordinates: 8.4000°N 80.2000°W

- Corregimiento
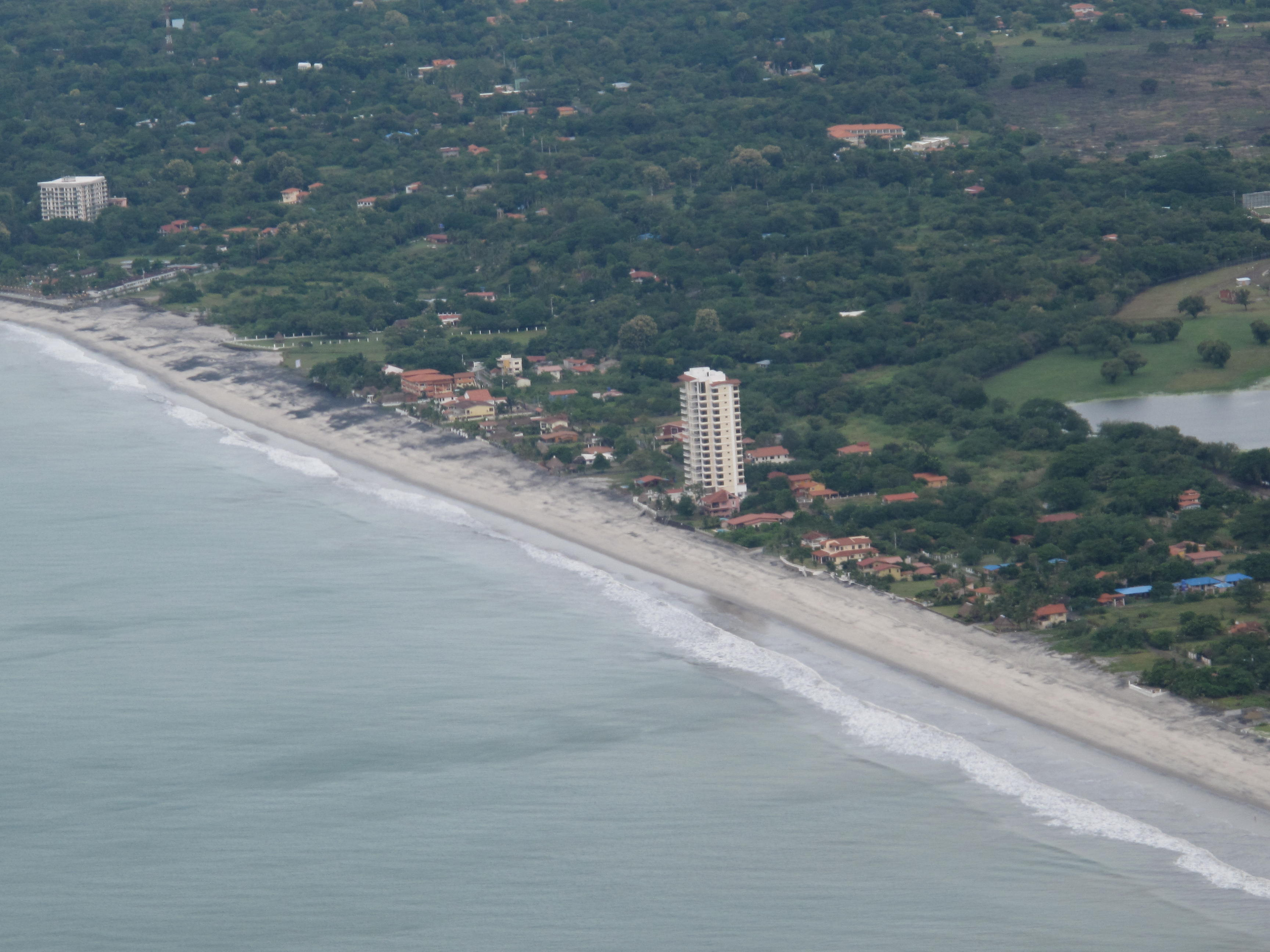
- Coast of el Chirú

- Location within Panama
- Country: Panama
- Province: Coclé
- District: Antón

Area
  - Land: 113.6 km^{2} (43.9 sq mi)

Population (2010)
  - Total: 3,623
  - Density: 31.9/km^{2} (83/sq mi)
- Population density calculated based on land area.
- Time zone: UTC−5 (EST)

El Chirú is a corregimiento in Antón District, Coclé Province, Panama. It has a land area of 113.6 square kilometres (43.9 sq mi) and had a population of 3,623 as of 2010, giving it a population density of 31.9 inhabitants per square kilometre (83/sq mi). Its population as of 1990 was 2,518; its population as of 2000 was 2,830.
