= Finca Blanco =

- Location within Panama
- Coordinates: 8°22′48″N 82°52′12″W
- Country: Panama
- Province: Chiriquí

Population (2008)
  - Total: 1 803
- Climate: Am

Finca Blanco is a town in the Chiriquí province of Panama.

== Sources ==
- World Gazeteer: Panama – World-Gazetteer.com

Finca Blanco is located in Chiriquí Province, Panama. It was one of the several banana plantations that functioned for many years for the Chiriquí Land Company, a subsidiary of United Brands. It is a kind of village that accommodated the employees and their families who worked in the banana plantations. Due to economic problems, strikes, banana diseases, and changes in the commercialization of the product the Chiriquí Land Company closed its operations in the area. Nowadays Finca Blanco is a farming area where former Chiriquí Land Company workers produce corn, rice, plantains and other farming product to subsist.
