= Antón District =

Antón
- District

- Location of the district capital in Panama
- Coordinates: 8°24′36″N 80°15′36″W
- Country: Panama
- Province: Coclé
- Capital: Antón

Area
  - Total: 749 km^{2} (289 sq mi)

Population (2023)
  - Total: 59,194
  - Density: 79.16/km^{2} (205.0/sq mi)
- Time zone: UTC-5 (ETZ)

Antón is a district (distrito) of Coclé Province in Panama. The population according to the 2023 census was 59,194. The district covers a total area of 749 km^{2}, and its capital city is Antón.

== Administrative divisions ==
Antón District is divided administratively into the following corregimientos:

- Antón (capital)
- Cabuya
- El Chirú
- El Retiro
- El Valle
- Juan Díaz
- Río Hato
- San Juan de Dios (corregimiento)
- Santa Rita
- Caballero

== Economy ==
Some of the district's primary economic activities include fishing, sugarcane production, and tourism.

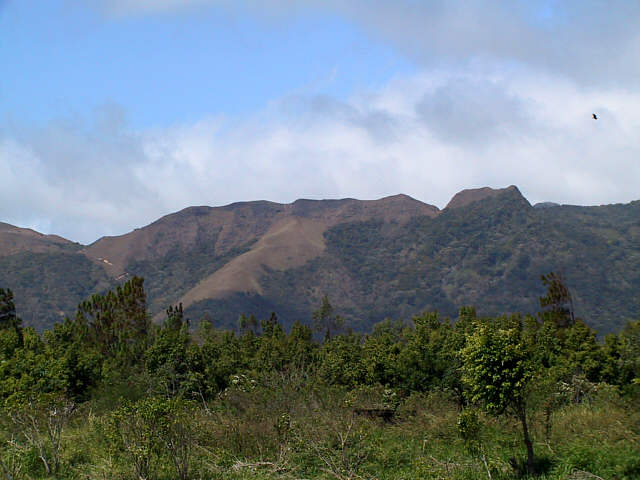
La India Dormida mountain

== See also ==
- San Juan de Dios, Coclé community
