= Estadio Virgilio Tejeira =

Football stadium in Penonomé, Coclé, Panama

Complejo Futbolístico Virgilio Tejeira Andrión
- Interactive map of Complejo Futbolístico Virgilio Tejeira Andrión
- Location: Penonomé, Coclé, Panama
- Coordinates: 8°29′35″N 80°20′22″W
- Owner: FEPAFUT
- Operator: FEPAFUT
- Surface: Natural turf

Construction
- Groundbreaking: 2001
- Opened: February 23, 2003
- Cost: $542,313

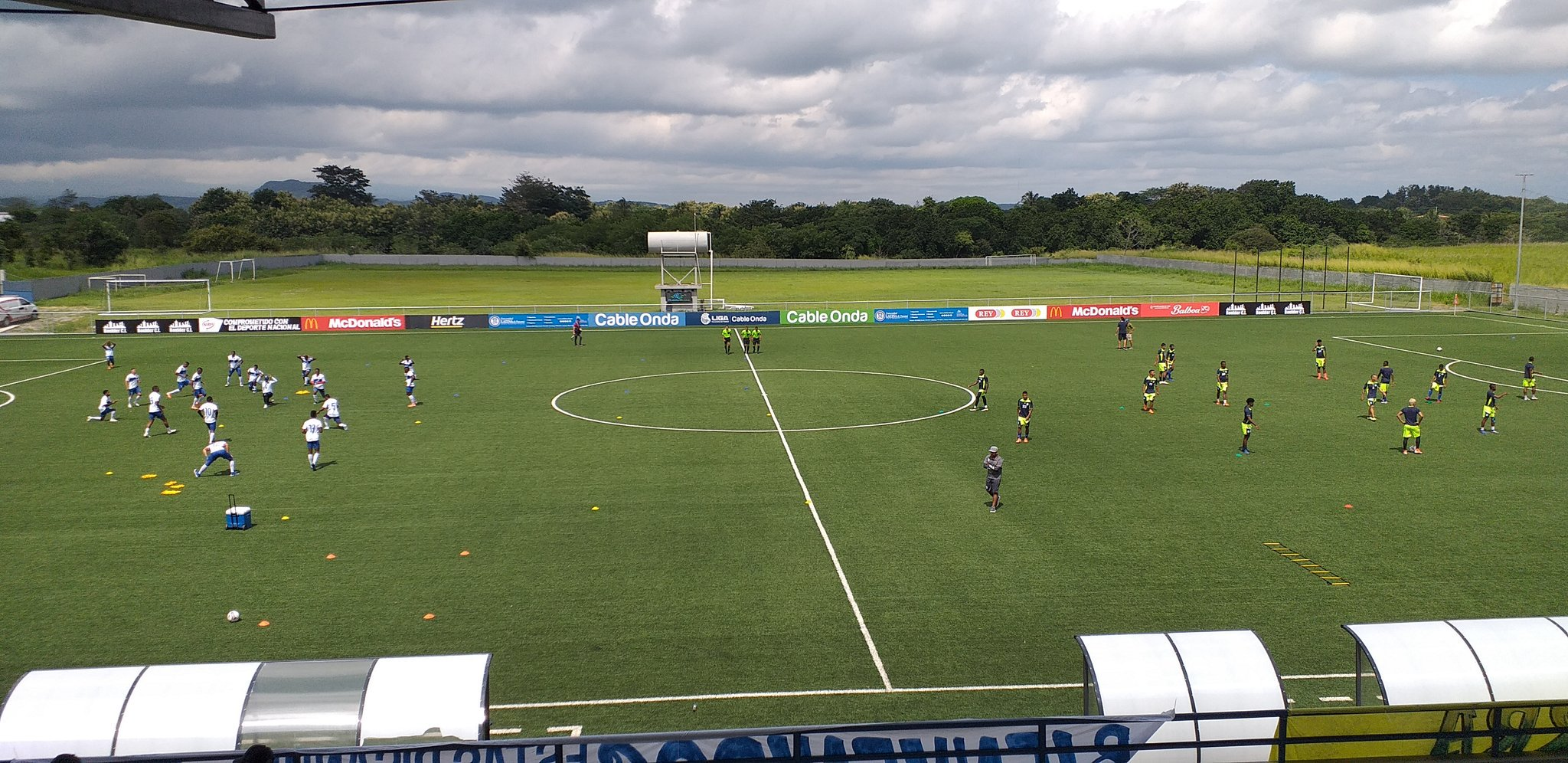
Estadio virgilio tejeira

Estadio Virgilio Tejeira Andrión is a Football stadium in Penonomé, Coclé, Panama which for the 2008 ANAPROF will host San Francisco F.C. and Atlético Veragüense. Virgilio Tejeira Andrión is the name of the person whom donated the lands for the constructions of the stadium.

On July 4, 2001, the FEPAFUT was authorized by FIFA to build a stadium as part of the Goal Project after the national U-20 Squad qualified for the first time to the 2003 FIFA Youth World being held in the United Arab Emirates. The funding came from FIFA and the FIFA Financial Assistance Programme who donated $400,000 and $142,313 respectively. The Panamanian Government donated the land on which the stadium would be constructed in Penonomé. On February 23, 2003, Jack Warner inaugurated the stadium.

For the 2008 ANAPROF the Virgilio Tejeira will host ANAPROF teams San Francisco F.C. and Atlético Veragüense because the Estadio Agustín Sánchez and Estadio Toco Castillo respectively are being remodeled in order to install artificial turf.
