= Divalá =

- Corregimiento
- Location within Panama
- Coordinates: 8°25′12″N 82°43′12″W
- Country: Panama
- Province: Chiriquí
- District: Alanje

Area
  - Land: 61.4 km^{2} (23.7 sq mi)

Population (2023)
  - Total: 3,496
  - Density: 56.9/km^{2} (147/sq mi)
- Population density calculated based on land area.
- Time zone: UTC−5 (EST)
- Climate: Am

Divalá is a corregimiento in Alanje District, Chiriquí Province, Panama. It has a land area of 61.4 square kilometres (23.7 sq mi) and had a population of 3,496 as of 2023, giving it a population density of 56.9 inhabitants per square kilometre (147/sq mi). Its population as of 2010 was 3,457; its population as of 2000 was 6,256.
