= Macaracas =

- Town and corregimiento

- Location within Panama
- Coordinates: 7°43′48″N 80°32′24″W
- Country: Panama
- Province: Los Santos
- District: Macaracas

Area
  - Land: 35.8 km^{2} (13.8 sq mi)

Population (2010)
  - Total: 2,890
  - Density: 80.8/km^{2} (209/sq mi)
- Population density calculated based on land area.
- Time zone: UTC−5 (EST)
- Climate: Aw

Macaracas is a historic town and corregimiento in Macaracas District, Los Santos Province, Panama with a population of 2,890 as of 2010. It is the seat of Macaracas District. Its population as of 1990 was 2,423; its population as of 2000 was 2,706.
