= C.A. Independiente de La Chorrera =

Independiente
- Full name: Club Atletico Independiente de La Chorrera
- Nicknames: Las Abejitas; Los Aurinegros; Los Vikingos
- Founded: 1982; 44 years ago
- Ground: Estadio Agustín Sánchez; La Chorrera, Panama
- Capacity: 3,040
- Chairman: Ignacio Molino
- Manager: Francisco Perlo
- League: Liga Panameña de Fútbol
- Website: caipty.com.pa/site/

Club Atlético Independiente de La Chorrera, also known as CAI or CAI de La Chorrera, is a Panamanian professional football club based in La Chorrera, that competes in the Liga Panameña de Fútbol.

== History ==
CAI, as the club is often called, was founded in 1982 to occupy young players who wished to play football. Under the leadership of Antonio Aguilar and Visitación Muñoz, the club began to participate in the local leagues of La Chorrera District, particularly those in the Martin Sánchez sector. A regular power at the local level, CAI moved up to the Colon league.

A major era of transition began in 1994, when club president Jaime Lay resigned. Aguila and Muñoz organized a new group of directors (Carlos Alberto Campos Muñoz, Luis Montezuma, Pedro Carrión, Jaime Dávila and Caesar Rogelio Lasso Madrid) and reorganized the club's administration. Carlos A. Campos Muñoz was chosen president, Antonio Aguilar as vice-president, Caesar R. Lasso Madrid as secretary, Visitación Muñoz as treasurer, Luis Montezuma as finance director, and Pedro Carrión and Jaime Dávila as spokespeople.

That same year, CAI won the La Chorrera District title with a 2–1 victory over Lidia Aurora F.C. and was promoted to the district championship. This moved CAI up into the second flight for the first time. However, they were not ready for this level, and were almost immediately relegated.

=== New beginning ===
Following the disappointment of the 1995 season, the new administration completely restructured the club. There was significant staff and player turnover, a new manager (Rene Salazar) and a renewed emphasis on the youth program. The directors set an ambitious timeline for the club—two years to reach the district tournament, three years to reach Primera A (now Liga Nacional de Ascenso) and six years to attain promotion to ANAPROF, the nation's top flight (now Liga Panameña de Fútbol).

Salazar's club quickly found success. They won their district championship in 1998, and then won the western championship of the Panamá Province. It didn't take long for René Salazar, the objective would be achieved. In 1997 CAI achieved to arrive to the series semifinal, however they lost against Santos Jorge 2–1.

=== Promotion ===
In 1998, CAI participated in the league of the Colon community, who worked as the local district tournament of the moment, but due to bad handlings and the negative arm of the policy, the tournament was a failure. With other club's president (Juventus F.C., San Jose F.C., San Germen F.C., San Francisco F.C. and Mitra F.C.), Carlos A. Campos Muñoz led together a movement to create a league for the Balboa community and motivated the community of Virgin of Guadalupe to create another league for that community, totalizing three leagues of the district of La Chorrera, which is today the local district tournament.

In the new league of the Balboa community, directed by Virgilio Landecho, CAI was crowned champion after beating Juventus F.C.

In 1999, the team participated in the tournament that gives promotion to the West of the Panamá Province, even when the intentions of the leadership of La Chorrera local district tournament to disband the club in retaliation to have led the movement to found the two leagues Balboa community and Virgin of Guadalupe community; but this was legally constituted and affiliated with the Panamanian Football Federation (Federación Panameña de Fútbol) and recognized by the National Institute of Sports (INDE, now PANDEPORTES), therefore La Chorrera local district tournament leaders could do nothing. Later, when the leadership of the Provincial League of Panama West recognized CAI's rights, the team was able to participate in this tournament, obtaining a successful campaign that is attributed to the administrative organization, to the skillful technical manual of Rene Salazar, the collaboration of friends and close friends to the club and the discipline and interest of the players. CAI managed to win the provincial final match, and having among its squad the top scorer of the tournament, Rubens Axel Almansa H. with 21 goals in the whole campaign.

In September 1999, CAI gained the right to represent Panama West in the national championship denominated Copa Rommel Fernández, of whom the provincial champions and runners-up participate. In this championship the team was placed in group four, next to the Tecnica and Deportes F.C. of Colón, Olimpic F.C. of Panamá and Punta Alegre F.C. of Darién. CAI classified second place behind Olimpic F.C. of Panama, in the regular round. During the second round the team reached the semifinals, beating Inter 3–2, Guabito F.C. 3–1, Río Abajo F.C. 2–0, San Isidro 2-0 and Niupy F.C. 5–1.

In the semifinal CAI beat Olimpic FC 2-0 and in the final they defeated Zona Libre F.C. 3–1. The favorites got to take the trophy home, with goals from José Luis Garcés (2) and a goal from Rubens Almanza. CAI were crowned champions of the Copa Rommel Fernández and gained promotion to Primera A.

The Panamanian Football Federation awarded the right of affiliation by a value of $3,000, $1,500 is of inscription and gives the club a check of $500,000 to resolve part of the expenses of CAIs first goal, to be in Primera A.

=== Primera A ===
The year 2000 was CAI's first participation in this championship, the team finished occupying the seventh place and staying in this division. Between 2000 and 2001 the team was able to fortify itself, working with responsible young players to face the challenges that would be imposed in the 2002–03 season. With the determination to manage this accomplishment and to reach the planned goals, the project begins with a year of anticipation with the newly assigned manager, Daniel "Ñelo" Montilla Ruiz, leading the team. Daniel Montilla, together with the rest of his technical body planned the recruitment of new players, obtaining a selective group and beginning to prepare them both physically and tactically, managing to have them ready for the beginning of the 2002–03 Apertura.

In 2002–2003 after passing a series of situations of instability with the championship system and the number of clubs that would participate in it, it was agreed to, on the part of the administration of ANAPROF that the championship would be of two seasons (Apertura and Clausura) and the number of clubs would be 15, divided into two groups; A and B.

Group A would include the participants of the east zone (Panamá and Colón): Club Deportivo Pan de Azúcar, Asociación Deportiva Orión, Club Deportivo Italia, Club Deportivo Español, Río Abajo, Chepo and Colón River. CAI would be placed in group B which would include the west zone (La Chorrera and the rest of the provinces of the interior): Club Atlético Guadalupe, Chame F.C., Coclesana F.C., Chitré F.C., Niupi F.C., Chiriquí F.C. and Bocas del Toro F.C.

The teams that would get promoted to the ANAPROF were the champions of the Apertura and Clausura. If the same team won both the Apertura and Clausura season, then the other team to get promoted would be the one who was better placed when both seasons are averaged up. The system of the Apertura season would be that each team plays the other teams of its respective group in a home and away match, and the first two of each group would later face each other in a quadrangular in which the first and second place teams would face each other in a final.

CAI managed to finish first place of group B and gained the right to proceed to the next round. In the quadrangular the team finalized first without losing a single match and was to face Club Deportivo Pan de Azúcar in the Apertura final. The final match was played at the Estadio Rommel Fernández, it was a worthy final match for this second flight division. The game finalized 4–3 in favor of Club Deportivo Pan de Azúcar and thus frustrating CAI's aspirations to assure a participation in ANAPROF. Rubens A. Almansa was the top scorer of the championship with 20 goals.

Sadly on February 1, 2003 CAI mourned the unexpected death of Daniel "Ñelo" Montilla, who was murdered when he tried to defend his daughters who were being assaulted by thieves.

The Clausura season was difficult since the team started without five of their star players, who because of their good participation performance were hired by other clubs of the Professional league, thus significantly weakening the squad. These players were Axel Almanza, Héctor Martinez, Hanamel Hill, Julio Creek and Juan Maning. Given the present circumstances, CAI had to reorganize its squad with young players. The Clausura season ended with a modest presentation of the team, achieving maintenance of their category.

For the 2004 championship the team played with a young squad and a new manager, CAI participated modestly occupying the seventh place. In view of the previous result, it was decided to regroup all the young players of the categories U-15, U-17, U-19 and the youngest players of Primera A, to train with them for five months in anticipation of the 2005 championship.

CAI obtained from Ciudad del Niño, a charity organization that lodges more than 300 children of limited resources and without homes, a great amount of land where sporting facilities existed previously. The club intended to restore them and use them as a training camp and game venue.

In 2006 CAI did not manage to reach at the semifinals and remained in fourth place with 16 points. The promotion in a period of three years had been planned (2010) and to accomplish it the club had turned their attentions to the younger players in the U-13 and U-15 squads.

In 2007 there was no competition in the Primera A due to an organization problem, however the league was planned to start in 2008. For the 2008 season of the Primera A, CAI had a campaign they would wish to forget, ending up last in the aggregate table of both the Apertura and Clausura championships. Since they were the last overall they were to be demoted to the Copa Rommel Fernández, but fortunately for CAI, the board of directors of the Primera A had decided to expand the number of teams of the league from 8 to 10, which would mean that not only would the champion and runner-up of the 2009 season of the Copa Rommel Fernández be promoted, but also the last team in the aggregate table (CAI) would not be relegated.

In 2009 the team was bought by Ricardo Escobar and completely changed the management and the name of the club to Independiente F.C.. They would play their home games for the 2009 season in the Estadio Agustín Sánchez of La Chorrera. In the Apertura championship CAI finished runner-up to last years Liga Nacional de Ascenso champions Río Abajo.

In 2013 a new board of directors took control of the club and the team won the Clausura and the Super Final game to promote the team to the Liga Panameña de Fútbol.

In May 2015 they were beaten by Árabe Unido in the Clausura championship final, after they had already been relegated.

Two years later, during the Clausura 2017, CAI gained its promotion to the LPF again by winning the Super Final of the Liga Nacional de Ascenso against Costa del Este F.C. The game ended 2–1 with two goals scored by Porfirio Ávila and Manuel Torres.

On 20 May 2018, the club won its first championship in the LPF after defeating one of the most historical clubs in Panama, Tauro F.C. The team, managed by former goalkeeper Donaldo González, won the game 1-0 because of a penalty scored by midfielder Omar Browne. This victory gave the club the right to represent Panama in the CONCACAF Champions League. This is the very first time that the team has the opportunity to represent Panama in an international tournament, where they faced former MLS champions, Toronto F.C. winning 4–0 in the first leg and drawing 1–1 in the 2nd leg, thus eliminating them from the tournament.

CAI is crowned champion of the Closing Tournament 2022 of the Tigo Panamanian Soccer League and achieves its fourth title in Panamanian football after beating Club Deportivo Universitario 2-1 in overtime. The goals were made by Josep Cox from a penalty by Club Deportivo Universitario in the 6th minute by penalty. At the start of the second half, the CAI player Gilberto Hernández sent the ball to the net at 53 minutes from a set piece. minutes and in minute 117 Víctor Ávila scored, the winning goal.

Club Atlético Independiente (CAI) is established as two-time champion of the Panamanian Football League (LPF) after beating Tauro FC 3 goals to 1 at the Rommel Fernández stadium and achieves its fifth star of National Football. At minute 2, CAI advanced towards the bullfighting area. Jorge Serrano put in a cross that Gerardo Negrete tried to reject, but surprised goalkeeper Celino Hinojosa and put the ball into the back of the net to make it 1-0 in favor of the 'Vikings'. With this own goal, he became the fastest goal in a final of the Panamanian Football League (LPF) when he did it at minute 1:32 seconds. At minute 26, Colombian striker Breidy Goluz tied the game after the CAI defenders cleared the ball from a corner and Gerardo Negrete, author of the own goal, gave Goluz an assist and thus tied the game 1-1. During the second half, both teams tried to get restless, but the goal fell at minute 76 through a shot by Víctor Ávila that scored CAI's second goal of the match. Ángel Valverde sentenced the game at minute 90 + 2' when Jorge Serrano stole the ball near the bullfighting area and passed it to Víctor Ávila and in a very good way gave Valverde the pass to score the third goal and thus set the score 3-1 over Tauro FC.

Club Atlético Independiente (CAI) of La Chorrera, was superior throughout the match against Tauro, which they beat (3-0), in the final of the Panamanian Football League (LPF), in a match held on December 9 of 2023 at night in Penonomé, Coclé at the University Stadium. The path to victory was opened with a double by Panamanian striker Carlos Small, at 7 and 21 minutes, and his compatriot Anthony Stewart closed the victory at 90 minutes. CAI de La Chorrera was crowned in the 2023 Closing Tournament, it was its third consecutive title (three championships) and its sixth star in its Football history in the highest category of Panamanian Football.

On November 30, 2024, CAI was crowned champion of the 2024 Clausura Tournament of the Panamanian Football League (LPF) with a victory over Plaza Amador, 2 goals to 1, in the final of the competition that was held at the Rommel Fernández Gutiérrez stadium.

This is the seventh championship for Club Atlético Independiente in its history within the top division of Panamanian football. The goals were scored in the second half by the club from La Chorrera, which won thanks to a goal by Ángel Valverde and an own goal by Kairo Walters. Isidoro Hinestroza scored for Plaza Amador in added time, with a goal from a bicycle kick. However, time was not enough for him to complete a comeback. For fans and experts of Panamanian football, the La Chorrera club became the 5th biggest team in the Central American country.

== Emblems and Motto ==
The team's colors are blue for signifying the idea of water and sky and yellow for signifying the idea of light, life and youth. The team's motto is:

- Lealtad (loyalty): the commitment of fidelity, respect and fulfillment of life, to the soccer, its rules, the fair-play and the club.
- Honor: the honesty and dignity of a sportsman and the importance of defending at the colors of the club.
- Disciplina (discipline): the fulfillment of the responsibilities and obligations that concern to situations in life and norms of the club.

== Honours ==
=== Domestic honours ===
- Liga Panameña de Fútbol and predecessors
  - Champion (7): Clausura 2018, Clausura 2019, Clausura 2020, Clausura 2022, Apertura 2023, Clausura 2023, Clausura 2024
- Primera A and predecessors
  - Champions (2) : Clausura 2013, Clausura 2017

==== Cups ====
- Copa Rommel Fernández and predecessors
  - Champions (1) : 2000

== Players ==
=== Current squad ===
Note: Flags indicate national team as defined under FIFA eligibility rules; some limited exceptions apply. Players may hold more than one non-FIFA nationality.

| No. | Pos. | Nation | Player |
|---|---|---|---|
| 1 | GK | COL | Luis Rivas |
| 3 | DF | PAN | Orman Davis |
| 4 | MF | PAN | José Quiroz |
| 5 | DF | PAN | Aimar Modelo |
| 7 | FW | PAN | José Fajardo |
| 8 | MF | PAN | Uziel Maltez |
| 9 | FW | PAN | Ángel Sánchez |
| 10 | MF | PAN | Rafael Águila |
| 11 | MF | PAN | Ángel Valverde |
| 12 | GK | PAN | Eddie Roberts |
| 13 | DF | PAN | Jean Montenegro |
| 15 | FW | PAN | Alberto Saldaña |

| No. | Pos. | Nation | Player |
|---|---|---|---|
| 17 | FW | PAN | Kevin Meneses |
| 19 | MF | PAN | Marlon Ávila |
| 20 | DF | PAN | Luis Torres |
| 22 | DF | PAN | Sergio Ramírez |
| 23 | FW | PAN | Héctor Hurtado |
| 25 | FW | PAN | Davis Contreras |
| 30 | FW | PAN | Carlos Small |
| 34 | GK | PAN | Francisco Núñez |
| 36 | MF | PAN | Kevin Record |
| 46 | FW | PAN | Anthony Stewart |
| 51 | MF | PAN | Luis Fields |
| 77 | FW | PAN | Víctor Ávila |

== Non-playing staff ==
=== Board of directors ===
| Position | Name |
|---|---|
| President | Ignacio Molino |
| General Manager | - |

=== Management hierarchy ===
| Position | Name |
|---|---|
| Manager | (Venezuela) Francisco Perlo |
| Assistant manager | - |
| Physical trainer | (Venezuela) José Marrufo |
| Goalkeeping coach | (Venezuela) Anthony Di Franco |
| Physiotherapist | (Panama) Javier González |
| Head Doctor | (Panama) Federico Fonseca |
| Utility Assistant | (Panama) Lázaro Gómez |

=== Historical list of coaches ===
- (Panama) Daniel Montilla
- (Panama) Franklin Narváez (January 2008 – April 2014)
- (Panama) Víctor Mendieta (June 2014 – October 2014)
- (Panama) Pascual Moreno (October 2014 – November 2014)
- (Colombia) Jair Palacios (December 2014 – )
- (Panama) Donaldo González (2018)
- (Venezuela) Francisco Perlo (December 5, 2018 – December 2021)
- (Venezuela) Iván Guerra (December 2021 - April 2022)
- (Panama) Franklin Narváez (May 2022 – September 2025 )
- (Panama) Roberto Rodríguez interim (September 2025 – Present )

== Performance in CONCACAF tournaments ==
- CONCACAF Champions League/Cup: 1 appearance
  2019: Quarter-finals
  2024: Round one
