= Antón =

- Corregimiento
- Location within Panama
- Coordinates: 8°24′36″N 80°15′36″W
- Country: Panama
- Province: Coclé
- District: Antón

Area
  - Land: 106.3 km^{2} (41.0 sq mi)

Population (2010)
  - Total: 9,790
  - Density: 92.1/km^{2} (239/sq mi)
- Population density calculated based on land area.
- Time zone: UTC−5 (EST)
- Climate: Aw

Antón is a corregimiento in Antón District, Coclé Province, Panama. It is located near the north-western shore of the Gulf of Panama. It is the seat of Antón District. It has a land area of 106.3 square kilometres (41.0 sq mi) and had a population of 9,790 as of 2010, giving it a population density of 92.1 inhabitants per square kilometre (239/sq mi). Its population as of 1990 was 7,220; its population as of 2000 was 8,360.

== Climate ==
Climate data for Anton (1971–2000)
Month	Jan	Feb	Mar	Apr	May	Jun	Jul	Aug	Sep	Oct	Nov	Dec	Year
Mean daily maximum °C (°F)	33.1 (91.6)	34.2 (93.6)	34.9 (94.8)	35.2 (95.4)	34.7 (94.5)	33.6 (92.5)	33.3 (91.9)	33.5 (92.3)	33.3 (91.9)	33.0 (91.4)	33.0 (91.4)	32.9 (91.2)	33.7 (92.7)
Mean daily minimum °C (°F)	21.3 (70.3)	21.6 (70.9)	21.6 (70.9)	22.5 (72.5)	21.9 (71.4)	21.9 (71.4)	21.4 (70.5)	21.4 (70.5)	21.3 (70.3)	21.3 (70.3)	21.2 (70.2)	21.5 (70.7)	21.6 (70.8)
Average rainfall mm (inches)	30.8 (1.21)	6.3 (0.25)	7.1 (0.28)	39.2 (1.54)	170.7 (6.72)	188.0 (7.40)	171.6 (6.76)	192.6 (7.58)	214.0 (8.43)	255.2 (10.05)	213.2 (8.39)	89.2 (3.51)	1,577.9 (62.12)
Average rainy days (≥ 0.1 mm)	1.7	0.6	1.1	3.3	12.2	14.5	12.7	14.7	14.6	17.6	14.7	6.5	114.2
Source: World Meteorological Organization
