= C.D. Pan de Azúcar =

Panamanian football club

Pan de Azúcar
- Full name: Club Deportivo Pan de Azúcar
- Founded: October 16, 1974
- Ground: LINCE; Panama City, Panamá
- Capacity: 300
- Chairman: Adalberto Agámez
- Manager: Alexander Fernandez
- League: Copa Rommel Fernandez
Home colours	Away colours

Club Deportivo Pan de Azúcar is a Panamanian football team playing in third level Copa Rommel Fernandez.

It was founded in 1974 and it is based in San Miguelito.

== History ==
Pan de Azúcar participated a number of times in ANAPROF, achieving 2 fourth-place finishes in 1993 and 1994 and a third place in 1995 before relegating to Primera A (now Liga Nacional de Ascenso) in 1999. Pan de Azúcar had to wait until 2003 to promote to ANAPROF, becoming the first team in Panamanian football history to promote after previously being relegated. However, the team was relegated once again in 2004.

In 2012–13, the team was relegated to amateur level known as Copa Rommel Fernandez.

In March 2014, it was reported that long-time club president Adalberto Agámez had died. He had led the club during their most successful period in the 1990s, finishing twice in 4th place of the ANAPROF competition. The club responded on Twitter that the reports were false and that Agámez was still alive. Former player Juan Serrano was killed in March 2014.

== Players ==
1. Miguel Trujillo (GK)

22. Miguel Corella (GK)

17. Romario Flores (CB) (C)

28. Virgil Paterson (CB)

19. Jonathan "Carroso" Gil (LB)

3. Amaury Meza (CF)

6. Trey Quintero (CM)

9. Guillermo "Isco" Enrique (CF)

== Honours ==
- Liga Nacional de Ascenso: 0

Runner-up (3): 2000, 2003, 2006
