= S.D. Atlético Nacional =

Association football club in Panama

Atlético Nacional
- Full name: Sociedad Deportiva Atlético Nacional
- Nicknames: Tongos, Uniformados, Equipo Policiaco, El equipo de la Policia [Police Team]
- Founded: 1995; 30 years ago
- Ground: Estadio Javier Cruz; San Miguelito, Panamá
- Capacity: 2500
- Chairman: Eduardo Serracin
- Manager: Daniel Valencia
- League: Liga Panameña de Fútbol
- 2015 (C): 1st (champions)
Home colours

Sociedad Deportiva Atlético Nacional is a Panamanian professional football team who currently play in the Panamanian second division.

It is based in Panama City, and is the team of the National Police of Panamá.

== History ==
=== Atlético Nacional ===
Atletico Nacional
- Full name: Atletico Nacional de Panama
- Nickname: Los Linces
- Founded: 1995
- Dissolved: 2001
- Ground: Estadio Agustín "Muquita" Sánchez; La Chorrera, Panama
- Capacity: 3,000
- League: ANAPROF
| Home colours | Away colours |

In 1995, a team named Atlético Nacional was founded and played a couple of years in the ANAPROF league until they were disbanded in 2001 due to manipulation and alteration of documents. Nicknamed Los Linces (The Bobcats), Atlético Nacional had always been one of Panama's historic teams to play in ANAPROF, and even though they had never won a championship they managed to become a surprise team in the league on more than one occasion. In 1996–97 the club played a modest season after just coming 1 point short of reaching the hexagonal round of ANAPROF, it finished 8th of 12 teams. In the next season there were changes in the league format, instead of having a general table, the 1997–98 season was divided in two groups, Atletico Nacional managed to improve its performance by finishing 3rd in its group. However they lost the quarter-final match against Plaza Amador 2–1 on aggregate. The following season Atletico Nacional managed to achieve the same success they had accomplished the previous season, finishing 2nd in their group, but were eliminated in the hexagonal round (yet another ANAPROF change in its format) when finishing 5th. The same results would occur in the 1999–2000 season, after finishing 6th in the general table and classifying to the hexagonal round, the team was eliminated when it finished last. The 2000–01 season was its last season where the team reached the hexagonal round, after finishing 5th in the general table, but the same results as the previous season repeated themselves and the team finished 6th.

==== Final season ====
2001 was the last season of Atletico Nacional, after the league was reformatted and divided into Apertura and Clausura championships, the team never managed to get into the hexagonal round. The apertura was the worst of its history; the team finished 9th of 10 teams. In the clausura they managed to improve, but still came one point short of reaching the hexagonal round. Atletico Nacional's last game in ANAPROF was against Alianza F.C. where they were defeated 2–1. Rolando Escobar scored the last goal for the team.

==== Disbandment ====
In October 2001 Atlético Nacional were ejected from the league because of violating ANAPROF rules. They had been using Colombian player Luis Palacios on a Panamanian registration, because only 5 foreigners were allowed by ANAPROF. Their expulsion saved Chiriquí from the drop.

=== Club Deportivo Policía Nacional ===
The club were reformed in 2005 as Club Deportivo Policía Nacional in Liga Nacional de Ascenso (second division), and in 2005 the team managed promotion to the top level after beating Atalanta 1–0. They were relegated to the Second Division in 2006.

=== Sociedad Deportiva Atlético Nacional ===
They were renamed Sociedad Deportiva Atlético Nacional in 2008. In December 2012, Atlético Nacional lost the Apertura final to Millenium UP but they clinched promotion to the LPF in June 2015 after they won the Panamanian Second Division championship decider against SUNTRACS. They had already beaten SUNTRACS in November 2014 in the Apertura final.

Atlético Nacional's old crest

== Honours ==
- Liga Nacional de Ascenso: 2

2005, 2015

== Players ==
=== Current squad ===
As of Apertura 2015 Note: Flags indicate national team as defined under FIFA eligibility rules; some limited exceptions apply. Players may hold more than one non-FIFA nationality.

| No. | Pos. | Nation | Player |
|---|---|---|---|
| — | GK | PAN | Francisco Portillo |
| — | GK | PAN | Ismael de la Espada |
| — | DF | ARG | Alvaro Bonilla |
| — | DF | PAN | Nahil Carroll |
| — | DF | PAN | David Daniels |
| — | DF | PAN | Mario Henríquez |
| — | DF | PAN | Yair Jaén |
| — | DF | BOL | Jonathan Sánchez |
| — | DF | PAN | Francisco Vence |
| — | DF | PAN | Rigoberto Villareal |
| — | MF | PAN | Alexis Gondola |
| — | MF | PAN | Luis Jiménez |
| — | MF | PAN | Luis Lewis |

| No. | Pos. | Nation | Player |
|---|---|---|---|
| — | MF | BOL | Manuel Martínez |
| — | MF | BOL | Rubén Martínez |
| — | MF | PAN | José Angel Pedroza |
| — | MF | PAN | Pablo Pérez |
| — | MF | PAN | Óscar Quijada |
| — | MF | PAN | Luis Alberto Ramos |
| — | DF | PAN | Derwinch Rodríguez |
| — | FW | COL | Andrés Santamaría |
| — | FW | PAN | Basilio Warner |
| — | FW | PAN | Anthony Basile |
| — | FW | PAN | Ronney Charles |
| — | FW | CHI | Edilberto Moreno |
| — | FW | COL | Manuel Murillo |
| — | FW | PAN | Temistocles Pérez |
| — | FW | ECU | Alfredo Phillips |
| — | FW | PAN | Alberto Zapata |

=== Notable players ===
- (Panama) Georgi Aguilar
- (Panama) Alberto Blanco (2011–2013)
- (Panama) Rolando Escobar (2000–2003)
- (Panama) Juan Palacios

== Historical list of coaches ==
- (Panama) José Alfredo Poyatos (2012–2013)
- (Panama) José Chiari (2013–2014)
- (Panama) Eric Ortega (2015 – Jun 2015)
- (Colombia) Daniel Valencia (June 2015–)
- (Panama) Gustavo Ávila (July 2019 - Present)
