= A.D. Orión =

Panamanian football club

Orión
- Full name: Asociación Deportiva Orión
- Nickname(s): Aguilas Naranjas, Maquina Naranja, Oranges
- Founded: 2 June 1987 (as Atlético Orión)
- Ground: Cancha de Entrenamiento Luis Tapia; Panama City, Panama
- Capacity: 800
- Chairman: (Panama) Gabriel Jesus Castillo
- Manager: Juan Flores
- League: Liga Nacional de Ascenso
- 2011 (C): Quarterfinals; 4th (Group A)
Home colours	Away colours

Asociación Deportiva Orión is a Panamanian football team playing at the Liga Nacional de Ascenso. It is based in San Miguelito and it was founded in 1987.

== History ==
Las aguilas naranjas played in ANAPROF around mids 1990's, but they were demoted and have not since moved from Primera A

== Honours ==
- Copa Rommel Fernández
  - Champions (1): 2001
- Liga Nacional de Ascenso
  - Runners-up (2): 2008, 2009
