= Río Abajo F.C. =

Río Abajo
- Full name: Río Abajo Fútbol Club
- Nickname(s): Alto Voltaje (High Voltage)
- Founded: 1987
- Ground: Cancha Luis E. Tapia; Panama City, Panamá
- Capacity: 1,000
- Chairman: Mario Rodríguez
- Manager: Rubén Guevara
- League: Liga Nacional de Ascenso
Home colours	Away colours

Río Abajo Fútbol Club is a Panamanian football team playing in the Liga Nacional de Ascenso.

The team is based in Panama City and represents Río Abajo neighborhood.

== History ==
Río Abajo is the team that has won the most championships in the Liga Nacional de Ascenso with 3 titles, in 2008 and 2009 after defeating Orión twice 2–1 and 3–1 respectively. They have been defeated in the promotion playoff two consecutive seasons. In 2008 they lost against Plaza Amador by a 3–2 aggregate score and on 2009 they were defeated by Alianza by 2–1 aggregate score.

In May 2012 they beat C.A.I. and got promoted to Liga Panameña de Fútbol. They were relegated back to the second level in April 2014.

== Honours ==
- Liga Nacional de Ascenso: 3

2008, 2009, 2011–12

== Historical list of coaches ==
- (Panama) Rubén Guevara (2011 – Mar 13)
- (Colombia) Richard Parra (Sept 2013 – Feb 14)
- (Colombia) Juan Pablo Lopera (Feb 2014–)
- (Panama) Rubén Guevara (Aug 2014–)
