= Estadio Agustín Sánchez =

Panamanian football stadium

- El Monasterio "The Monastery"; El Muquita "The Muquita"; El Coloso de Matuna "The Colossus of Matuna"
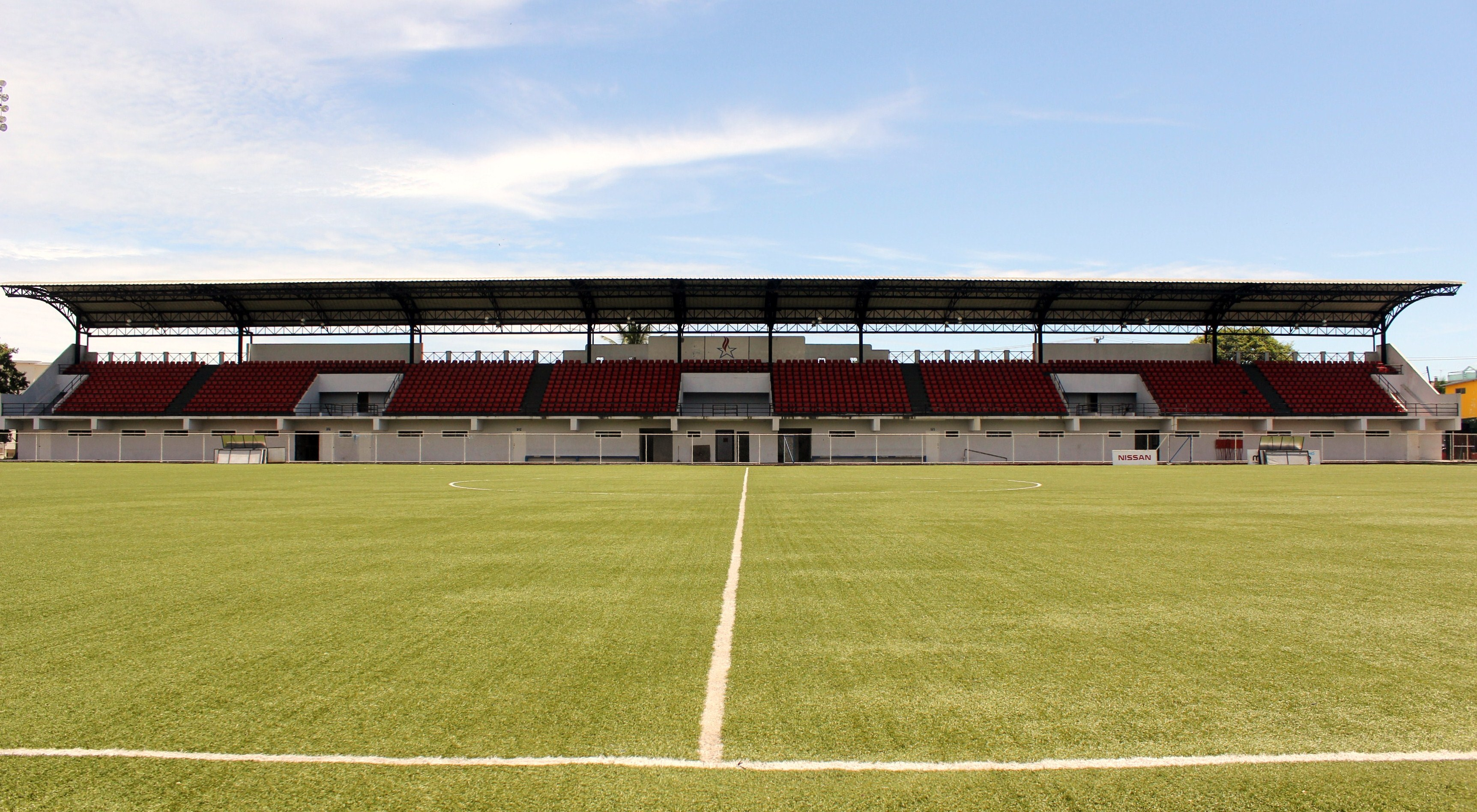
- Interactive map of Estadio Agustín Sánchez
- Location: La Chorrera, Panama
- Coordinates: 8°53′15″N 79°46′32″W
- Capacity: 3,040
- Surface: Artificial turf
- Field size: 105 m × 68 m (344 ft × 223 ft)

Construction
- Opened: 1968
- Renovated: 2009
- Cost: $1,997,192 (renovation)

Tenants
- San Francisco; Independiente

Estadio Agustín Muquita Sánchez is a football stadium in Panamá Oeste Province, Panama which hosts Liga Panameña de Fútbol teams San Francisco and Independiente, as well as other teams and local competitions from the La Chorrera district.

Formerly the stadium had slightly smaller dimensions and natural turf, but it was still used for ANAPROF games. In 2008, a joint effort from the Panamanian government and the national sport institute (INDE) spent $1,997,192 in installing artificial turf to the field, increase its dimensions to 105×68 m, seating capacity and also adding a better lighting system. The Muquita is certified a 1 to 2 star FIFA stadium rating.

The first official game in the renewed stadium was played on Friday March 27, 2009 when San Francisco defeated 2–1 Atlético Veragüense for the 2009 Liga Panameña de Fútbol championship. The first goal of the stadium was scored by Victor Herrera of San Francisco.
