= Liga Prom =

Panamanian association football league

Liga Prom Tigo
- Organising body: Fepafut
- Founded: February 19, 2021
- Country: Panama
- Confederation: CONCACAF
- Number of clubs: 24
- Level on pyramid: 2
- Promotion to: Suspended
- Relegation to: Suspended
- Broadcaster(s): Cable Onda Sports
- Sponsor(s): Tigo Panamá
- Website: Official website

Segunda División de Panamá also known as Liga Prom, is a professional league for association football clubs in Panama. It is the country's second-tier football competition, contested by 24 clubs with no promotion or relegation. The competition was formed in 2021.

== History ==
=== ANAPROF ERA ===
The Anaprof era is remembered for establishing the Primera A branding with a format of two short tournaments per season (Apertura and Clausura), similar to many Latin American championships. Champions teams required promotional playoff games with ANAPROF's (top-tier league) last placed team.

=== LNA ERA ===
LNA logo

The Liga Nacional de Ascenso was formed in 2009 to replace the governing body of the league and forced ANAPROF top-tier league to accept a direct promotion team. Other important goals were league expansion to 16 teams, later reduced to 14 teams after the 2011–12 season. The league was successful with attendance records since it had several popular teams like Río Abajo FC, C.A. Independiente, SUNTRACS FC and Atlético Nacional. This severely affected ANAPROF and LPF (top-tier league) attendance numbers and reputation.

=== LPF ERA ===
The Ascenso LPF (2016–2020) era organised by Panamanian Football Federation was mostly remembered for reducing participating teams to eight and disaffiliating several teams for missing documentation and requirements.

=== Liga PROM ===
After Manuel Arias won the Panamanian Football Federation election, the General Board accepted his proposal for a new structure for Panamanian football at all levels starting in 2021; for the second division tier, will have a 24-team league named Liga PROM, with promotion and relegation suspended. It added 12 LPF Under-20 teams, kept 7 remaining Ascenso LPF teams and invited 5 teams.

== Teams ==
The following teams are expected to play in the Liga Prom Apertura 2021 season.

Team	City	Stadium	Capacity	Founded	Joined	Head coach	LPF affiliate
Eastern Conference
Zona Norte
Árabe Unido U-20	Colón	Estadio Armando Dely Valdés (Note: Soccer specific stadium)	4,000	1994	2021	(Panama) Julio Medina	C.D. Árabe Unido
Champions FC Academy	Colón	Estadio Armando Dely Valdés	4,000	2016	2021	(Panama) Ausberto Valencia	
Colón C3 FC	Colón	Estadio Armando Dely Valdés	4,000	2010	2021	(Colombia) Carlos Miranda	
C.D. Centenario	Colón	Estadio Armando Dely Valdés	4,000	2011	2021	(Panama) Javier Miller	
UMECIT FC	San Miguelito	Estadio UMECIT (Note: aka as Colegio Instituto Bilingüe Internacional De Panamá soccer field at Villa Zaita.)	300	2020	2021	(Panama) Fredy Romero	
Sporting San Miguelito U-20	San Miguelito	Estadio Javier Cruz	2,500	1989	2021	(Panama) Jorge Santos	Sporting San Miguelito
Zona Sur
Alianza FC U-20	Juan Díaz	Estadio Cascarita Tapia	900	1963	2021	(Panama) José Soriano	Alianza FC
C.D. Plaza Amador U-20	El Chorrillo	Estadio Maracaná	5,500	1955	2021	(Panama) Cesar Morales	C.D. Plaza Amador
C.D. del Este U-20	Pacora	Estadio Maracaná	5,500	2008	2021	(Panama) Rubén Chávez	C.D. del Este
Panamá City FC	Panama City	Eagles Stadium	300	2014	2021	(Panama) Pablo Falquez	
San Martín FC	San Martín	Estadio Cascarita Tapia	900	2010	2021	(Peru) Alejandro Quezada R.	
Tauro FC	Pedregal	Estadio Javier Cruz	2,500	1984	2021	(Argentina) Javier Ainstein	Tauro FC
Western Conference
Zona Norte
Atlético Chiriquí U-20	David	Estadio San Cristóbal	2,500	2002	2021	(Venezuela) Jonathan Parra	Atlético Chiriquí
Herrera FC U-20	Chitré	Estadio Los Milagros	1000	2019	2021	(Venezuela) Hugo Domínguez	Herrera FC
Mario Mendez FC	David	Estadio San Cristóbal	2,500	2019	2021	(Panama) Mario Méndez	
Unión Coclé / San Antonio FC	Penonomé	Estadio Virgilio Tejeira (Note: aka as Proyecto Gol.)	900	2019	2021	(Panama) Jorge González	
Universitario	Penonomé	Estadio Universitario	3,500	2016	2021	(United States) (Panama) Mike Stump	U.D. Universitario
Veraguas C.D. U-20	Santiago	Complejo de Atalaya (Note: Temporary)	300	2020	2021	(Panama) José Anthony Torres	Veraguas C.D.
Zona Sur
C.A. Independiente U-20	La Chorrera	Estadio Agustín Sánchez	3,100	1982	2021	(Panama) Franklin Narvaez	C.A. Independiente
San Francisco FC U-20	La Chorrera	Estadio Agustín Sánchez	3,100	1992	2021	(Panama) Luis Ureña	San Francisco FC
S.D. Atlético Nacional	Juan Díaz	Estadio Oscar Suman Carrillo (Note: Shared facility; not a soccer-specific stadium)	1,000	2001	2021	(Panama) Gustavo Ávila	
S.D. Panamá Oeste	Capira	Estadio Agustín Sánchez	3,100	2010	2021	(Panama) Andrés Corbillon	
UDELAS FC	San Miguelito	CAI Sports Center (Note: Soccer training facility)	500	2020	2021	(Panama) Jayro Benavides	
Universidad de Panamá Águilas	Panama City	Estadio Oscar Suman Carrillo	1,000	2020	2021	(Colombia) David Acosta	

LPF team-affiliated

== Media coverage ==
The LPF has been partnered with local cable sports network Cableonda Sports (subsidiary of Tigo Panamá) to broadcast live games on the Cableonda TV cable system. In addition all teams are authorize to produce live streaming broadcasts using YouTube platform with no home or away matches restrictions, however is required to add Liga Prom logo and grant copyright to the LPF organization.

== Champions ==
Champions Timeline
Season	Champions	Runners–up	Notes
1989-90	Panamá Viejo FC	Los Toros (La Chorrera)	PVJ gain promotion to ANAPROF
1990-91	Sporting Colón	UTP	SPC gain promotion to ANAPROF
1992	UTP	Río Mar (Puerto Armuelles)	ROM gain promotion to ANAPROF
1997	Sporting 89	Atlético Municipal Colón	S89 gain promotion to ANAPROF
1998	Atlético Municipal Colón	Chorrillo FC	AMC gain promotion to ANAPROF
1999	Alianza FC	Atlético Guadalupe	AFC gain promotion to ANAPROF
2000	Chorrillo FC	CD Pan de Azucar	CFC gain promotion to ANAPROF
2001-02	Primavera FC	Zona Libre FC	PFC gain promotion to ANAPROF
2002	cancelled		
2003-A	CD Pan de Azucar	CA Independiente	
2003-C	River Plate Colón	Río Abajo FC	CDP and RPC gain promotion to ANAPROF due to league expansion
2004	Atlético Chiriquí	Sabanitas FC	ATC gain promotion to ANAPROF
2005	CD Policia Nacional	Dep. Atalanta	
2006	Chepo FC	CD Pan de Azucar	
2007	cancelled		
2008-A	AD Orión	Chorrillito FC	
2008-C	Río Abajo FC	Chorrillito FC	RAB lost promotion match against CD Plaza Amador
2009-A-I	Río Abajo FC	CA Independiente	
2009-A-II	AD Orión	Río Abajo FC	RAB lost promotion match against Alianza FC
2010-C	cancelled		
2010-A	Colón C3 FC	FC Veraguas 2010	
2011-C	SUNTRACS FC	CAI La Chorrera	CC3 gain promotion to LPF
2011-A	Río Abajo FC	Santa Gema FC	
2012-C	CAI La Chorrera	Tierra Firme FC	RAB gain promotion to LPF
2012-A	Millennium UP	S.D. Atlético Nacional	
2013-C	CAI La Chorrera	Millennium UP	CAI gain promotion to LPF
2013-A	Atlético Chiriquí	S.D. Atlético Nacional	
2014-C	SUNTRACS FC	Atlético Chiriquí	ATC gain promotion to LPF
2014-A	SD Atlético Nacional	SUNTRACS FC	
2015-C	SUNTRACS FC	Colón C3 FC	ATN gain promotion to LPF
2015-A	Santa Gema FC	Millenium UP	
2016-C	Atlético Veragüense	Colón C3 FC	STG gain promotion to LPF
2016-A	Costa del Este FC	CAI La Chorrera	
2017-C	CAI La Chorrera	Deportivo Municipal SM	CAI gain promotion to LPF
2017-A	Costa del Este FC	S.D. Atlético Nacional	
2018-C	Costa del Este FC	C.D. Centenario	CDE gain promotion to LPF
2018-A	Leones de América	Colón C3 FC	
2019-C	Atlético Chiriquí	S.D. Atlético Nacional	ATC gain promotion to LPF
2019-A	S.D. Atlético Nacional	Azuero FC	
2020	cancelled due to COVID-19 pandemic		
2021-A			

== See also ==
- Liga Panameña de Fútbol
