= San Miguelito District =

San Miguelito
- District
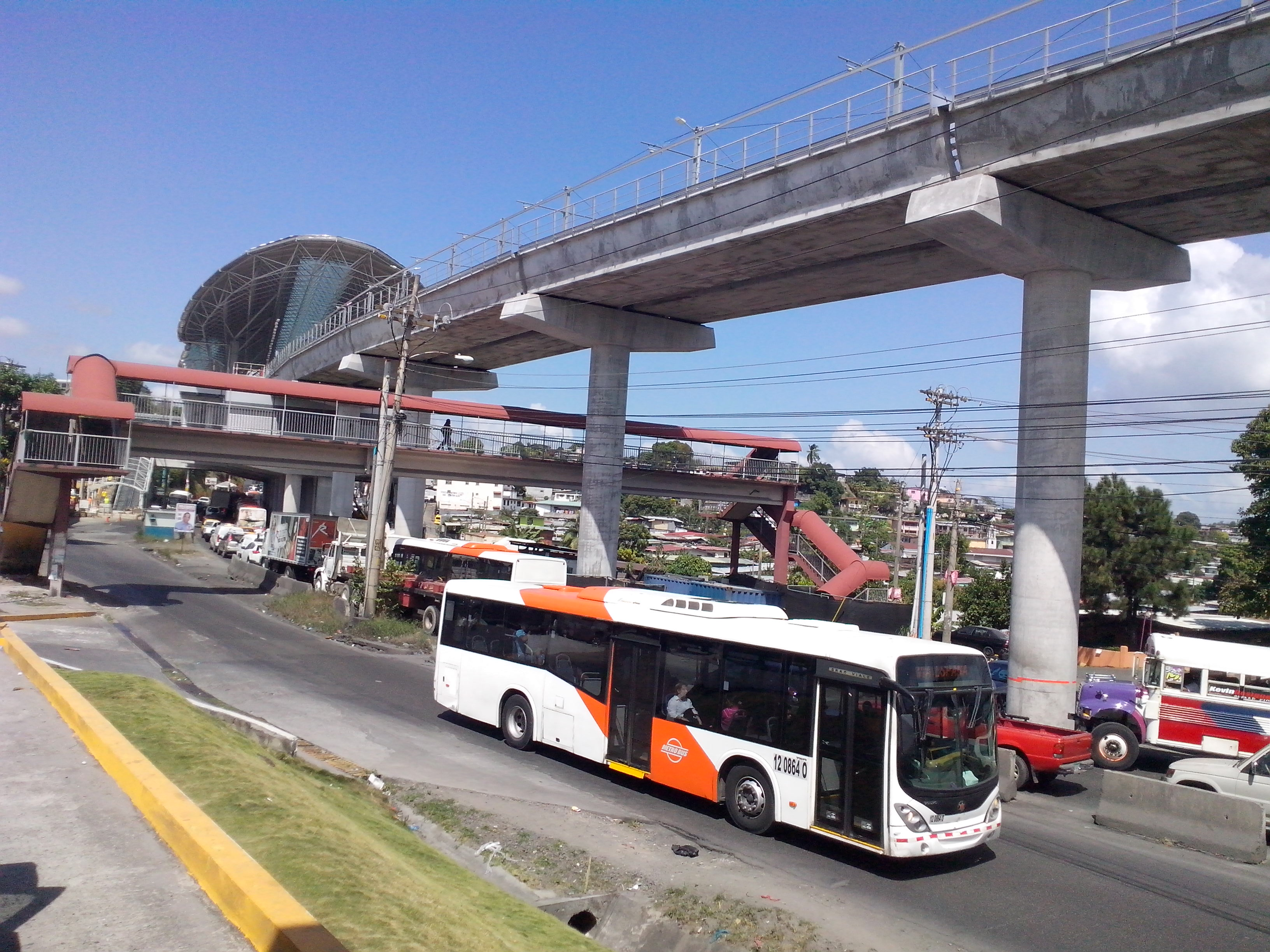
- Metrobus at a station in San Miguelito

- Flag
- Motto: “Tierra de la gente buena”(Spanish) “Land of good people”

- Location of the district capital in Panama
- Coordinates: 9°2′N 79°30′W
- Country: Panama
- Province: Panamá
- Capital: City-District

Government
  - Mayor: Irma Hernández (LP)

Area
  - Total: 50.1 km^{2} (19.3 sq mi)

Population (2023 census)
  - Total: 280,777
  - Density: 5,600/km^{2} (14,500/sq mi)
- Time zone: UTC-5 (ETZ)

San Miguelito is a city and district (distrito) of Panamá Province in Panama. The population according to the 2023 Panamanian census was 280,777. The district covers an area of 50.1 km^{2}. San Miguelito district is completely enclaved within Panama District (which completely surrounds it) and it is included in the Panama City Metropolitan Area.

Football player Luis Tejada was born in San Miguelito, and both Blas Pérez and Kevin Kurányi were once residents of the district.

== Administrative divisions ==
San Miguelito District is divided administratively into the following corregimientos:

Corregimientos of San Miguelito

- Amelia Denis de Icaza
- Belisario Porras
- José Domingo Espinar
- Mateo Iturralde
- Victoriano Lorenzo
- Arnulfo Arias
- Belisario Frías
- Omar Torrijos
- Rufina Alfaro

== Education ==
International School of Panama is located in San Miguelito.
