= Veraguas (disambiguation) =

Veraguas is a province of Panama.

Veraguas may also refer to:

- Veragua or Veraguas, the name of five Spanish colonial territorial entities in Central America, beginning in the 16th century
- Veraguas culture, or Chiriqui culture, a pre-Columbian Panamian culture
- Veraguas Club Deportivo, a Panama football team
- F.C. Veraguas 2010, a Panama football team

== See also ==
- Veraguas parakeet
