= 2010 Liga Nacional de Ascenso Apertura Final =

- Event: 2010 LNA Apertura
Veraguas 2010	Colón C-3
0	2
- Date: 16 October 2010
- Venue: Estadio Rommel Fernández, Panama City
- Referee: Jaffet Perea (Panama)

The 2010 Liga Nacional de Ascenso Apertura Final was the final match of the 2010 Liga Nacional de Ascenso Apertura, the 12th season of the second-highest league competition in Panamanian football.

== Background ==
This was the first final match that both teams made it to. Additionally, both teams were created earlier during the year as a result of the expansion project in the Liga Nacional de Ascenso.

Neither team had played each other prior to this final match because they both belonged to different groups.

== Match ==
=== Details ===
16 October 2010
20:00 (UTC-5)

Veraguas 2010	0 – 2 (a.e.t.)	Colón C-3
	Report	Enrico Small 94' 111'

Estadio Rommel Fernández, Panama City
Referee: Jaffet Perea (Panama)

Veraguas 2010	Colón C-3

VERAGUAS 2010:
GK	30	(Colombia) Nelson Gómez
RB	19	(Panama) Carlos Terrero	(red card) 26'
CB	3	(Panama) Oscar Aparicio (c)
CB	8	(Panama) Jorge Abrego	(yellow card) 63'
LB	25	(Panama) Luis Quintero	(substituted off) 83'
RM	29	(Panama) Jomag Caballero
CM	24	(Panama) Ricardo Agudo
CM	10	(Panama) James Brown	(yellow card) 39'
LM	12	(Panama) Manuel Vásquez	(yellow card) 104'
FW	27	(Panama) Eduardo Herrera	(substituted off) 45'
FW	7	(Colombia) John Freddy Mosquera
Substitutes:
FW	9	(Panama) Boris Peña	(substituted on) 45'	(substituted off) 98'
	20	(Panama) Euribiades González	(substituted on) 83'
	18	(Panama) Elias Concepción	(substituted on) 98'
Manager:
(Panama) Boris Abrego

COLON C-3:
GK	30	(Panama) Rigoberto Austin
RB	24	(Colombia) Ferney Argono (c)
CB	21	(Colombia) Gustavo Álvarez	(yellow card) 28'
CB	17	(Panama) Frank Edwards	(yellow card) 50' (yellow-red card) 76'
LB	8	(Panama) Néstor Murrillo
RM	20	(Panama) Yoel Thomas
CM	18	(Panama) Carlos Scott
CM	10	(Panama) Andres Jiménez	(substituted off) 75'
LM	23	(Panama) Luis Ortiz
FW	16	(Panama) Richie Vaughan	(substituted off) 45'
FW	9	(Panama) Enrico Small	(substituted off) 112'
Substitutes:
FW	28	(Panama) José Racero	(substituted on) 45'
	6	(Colombia) Jason Cano	(substituted on) 75'
		(Panama) Néstor Addles	(substituted on) 112'
Manager:
(Colombia) Carlos Miranda

MATCH OFFICIALS

- Assistant referees:
  - Antonio Garrido (Panama)
  - Roland Bruña (Panama)
- Fourth official: José Meléndez (Panama)

MATCH RULES

- 90 minutes.
- 30 minutes of extra-time if necessary.
- Penalty shoot-out if scores still level.
- Maximum of three substitutions.

2010 Apertura Champion:
Colón C-3
