= Bugaba =

Bugaba may refer to:

- Bugaba (corregimiento)
- Bugaba District
