= Chiriquí F.C. (2010) =

Panamanian football club

- Full name: Chiriquí Fútbol Club
- Founded: 2010
- Ground: Estadio Municipal de Bugaba; La Concepción, Panama
- Capacity: 2500
Home colours	Away colours

Chiriquí Fútbol Club was a Panamanian football team based in La Concepción de Bugaba, Chiriquí.

== History ==
The club was created in 2010 as part of the Liga Nacional de Ascenso expansion project for the 2010–11 season.
