= 2010–11 Liga Nacional de Ascenso =

Liga Nacional de Ascenso
- Season: 2010–11

The 2010–11 Liga Nacional de Ascenso season is the thirteenth edition since its establishment in 1996. A total of 16 teams contest the league, 10 of which returned from the 2009 season, 1 of which was promoted from Copa Rommel Fernández, and 5 of which have been invited to participate as part of the league's expansion project.

== Changes for the 2010–11 edition ==
- The league increased the number of participating teams from 10 to 16. SUNTRACS earned its spot as champions of the 2010 edition of the Copa Rommel Fernández while 5 other teams from the Colón, Chiriquí, Chiriquí Occidente, Coclé, and Veraguas provincial leagues were invited to participate as part of the league's expansion project.
- The teams were separated into 2 groups (Group A and Group B) containing 8 teams in each.
- There will be no more promotion play-off in this edition, instead the overall champion (that is the Grand Champion or the winner of both the Apertura and Clausura) will be promoted directly. Additionally, the team with the worst record in the general standings of the Liga Panameña de Fútbol will be relegated directly.

== Teams ==
Locations of the 2010-11 LNA teams

Club	City	Stadium	2009 season	Group
Atlético Nacional	Panama City	Estadio Javier Cruz	3rd in LNA	Group B
Chiriquí F.C.	David	Estadio San Cristóbal	Invited	Group B
Chiriquí Occidente F.C.	Puerto Armuelles	Estadio Glorias Baruenses	Invited	Group B
Chorrillito F.C.	Arraiján	Cancha del Mistic	4th in LNA	Group B
Coclé F.C.	Penonomé	Estadio Virgilio Tejeira	Invited	Group B
Colón C-3	Colón	Estadio Armando Dely Valdés	Invited	Group A
El Tecal	Arraiján	Cancha del Mistic	9th in LNA	Group B
Génesis	Panama City	Cancha de Entrenamiento Luis Tapia	10th in LNA	Group A
Independiente F.C.	La Chorrera	Estadio Agustín Sánchez	7th in LNA	Group B
Millenium F.C.	Panama City	Cancha de Entrenamiento Luis Tapia	8th in LNA	Group A
Orión	San Miguelito	Cancha de Entrenamiento Luis Tapia	5th in LNA (Runner-up)	Group A
Pan de Azúcar	San Miguelito	Cancha de Entrenamiento Luis Tapia	6th in LNA	Group A
Paraíso F.C.	San Miguelito	Cancha de Entrenamiento Luis Tapia	2nd in LNA	Group A
Río Abajo F.C.	Panama City	Cancha de Entrenamiento Luis Tapia	1st in LNA (Champion)	Group A
SUNTRACS F.C.	San Miguelito	Estadio Bernardo Gil	Copa Rommel Fernández champion	Group A
Veraguas 2010	Santiago	Estadio Áristocles Castillo	Invited	Group B

== Apertura 2010 ==
Liga Nacional de Ascenso
- Season: 2010 Apertura
- Champions: Colón C-3
- Top goalscorer: Enrico Small (15 goals)
- Biggest home win: Orión 8–2 Génesis; Atlético Nacional 6–0 El Tecal; Independiente 6–0 Chiriquí
- Biggest away win: Génesis 0–8 Colón C-3
- Highest scoring: Génesis 2–9 Orión

=== Regular Round ===
==== Group A ====
===== Standings =====
Pos	Team	Pld	W	D	L	GF	GA	GD	Pts	Qualification
1	Río Abajo	14	10	2	2	28	13	+15	32	Qualified to the Final Round
2	Orión	14	9	3	2	40	24	+16	30	Qualified to the Final Round
3	Colón C-3	14	8	3	3	41	16	+25	27	Qualified to the Final Round
4	Paraíso	14	8	2	4	33	18	+15	26	Qualified to the Final Round
5	Pan de Azúcar	14	5	4	5	25	24	+1	19	
6	SUNTRACS	14	2	2	10	20	32	−12	8	
7	Millenium	13	1	5	7	19	35	−16	8	
8	Génesis	13	1	1	11	17	61	−44	4	

Updated to match(es) played on 28 August 2010. Source: LNA
Rules for classification: 1) points; 2) goal difference; 3) number of goals scored.

====== Positions by round ======
Team ╲ Round	1	2	3	4	5	6	7	8	9	10	11	12	13	14
Colón C-3	2	4	3	2	4	3	4	4	4	4	2	4	4	3
Génesis	8	8	8	8	8	8	8	8	8	8	8	8	8	8
Millenium	5	6	6	7	7	7	7	7	7	7	7	7	7	7
Orión	1	2	4	4	3	4	3	3	2	2	3	2	2	2
Pan de Azúcar	5	5	5	6	5	6	6	6	5	5	5	5	5	5
Paraíso	3	3	2	2	2	2	2	2	3	3	4	3	3	4
Río Abajo	3	1	1	1	1	1	1	1	1	1	1	1	1	1
SUNTRACS	7	7	7	5	6	5	5	5	6	6	6	6	6	6

Source: LNA

===== Results =====
Home \ Away	CC3	GEN	MIL	ORI	PdA	PAR	RA	SUN
Colón C-3		8–2	4–1	5–2	1–1	2–1	0–2	3–0
Génesis	0–8			2–9	2–4	1–6	1–2	1–0
Millenium	1–4	2–2		2–3	2–2	0–1	1–1	2–1
Orión	1–1	4–0	3–1		2–1	3–1	1–2	1–1
Pan de Azúcar	2–1	4–2	3–3	1–2		1–3	2–1	0–2
Paraíso	2–1	5–1	6–1	0–0	1–1		0–2	3–2
Río Abajo	0–0	5–3	2–0	3–4	1–0	3–1		2–0
SUNTRACS	1–3	4–0	3–3	4–5	1–3	0–4	0–2	

Updated to match(es) played on 28 August 2010. Source: LNA
Legend: Blue = home team win; Yellow = draw; Red = away team win.

==== Group B ====
===== Standings =====
Pos	Team	Pld	W	D	L	GF	GA	GD	Pts	Qualification
1	Atlético Nacional	14	9	3	2	33	12	+21	30	Qualified to the Final Round
2	Independiente	14	8	4	2	30	12	+18	28	Qualified to the Final Round
3	Veraguas 2010	14	6	3	5	23	19	+4	21	Qualified to the Final Round
4	Coclé	14	5	3	6	21	20	+1	18	Qualified to the Final Round
5	Chorrillito	14	5	3	6	16	26	−10	18	
6	Chiriquí	14	5	2	7	18	30	−12	17	
7	Chiriquí Occidente	14	2	5	7	13	25	−12	11	
8	El Tecal	14	1	7	6	20	30	−10	10	

Updated to match(es) played on 28 August 2010. Source: LNA
Rules for classification: 1) points; 2) goal difference; 3) number of goals scored.

====== Positions by round ======
Team ╲ Round	1	2	3	4	5	6	7	8	9	10	11	12	13	14
Atlético Nacional	2	1	1	1	1	1	1	1	1	1	1	1	1	1
Chiriquí	7	5	5	2	3	4	3	4	4	5	4	5	6	6
Chiriquí Occidente	3	6	7	7	8	8	6	6	5	4	6	7	7	7
Chorrillito	3	2	3	5	5	6	5	5	6	6	7	6	5	5
Coclé	8	8	8	8	6	5	7	8	8	7	5	4	4	4
El Tecal	3	7	6	6	7	7	8	7	7	8	8	8	8	8
Independiente	3	3	2	4	2	2	2	2	2	2	2	2	2	2
Veraguas 2010	1	4	3	3	4	3	4	3	3	3	3	3	3	3

Source: LNA

===== Results =====
Home \ Away	AN	CHI	OCC	CHO	COC	DET	IND	VER
Atlético Nacional		1–1	2–0	0–1	4–2	6–0	4–1	2–1
Chiriquí	2–3		0–2	1–0	1–2	3–2	2–2	2–4
Chiriquí Occidente	0–0	0–1		0–1	1–1	2–2	0–2	0–4
Chorrillito	1–6	0–2	1–3		1–0	3–2	1–2	2–1
Coclé	1–1	5–0	3–0	3–1		2–0	0–2	0–2
El Tecal	1–3	1–2	3–3	2–2	1–1		1–1	
Independiente	0–1	6–0	3–0	1–1	4–1	1–1		3–1
Veraguas 2010	1–0	2–1	2–2	2–2	2–0	1–1	0–1	

Updated to match(es) played on 28 August 2010. Source: LNA
Legend: Blue = home team win; Yellow = draw; Red = away team win.

=== Final round ===
Quarter-finals (agg)
3	Veraguas 2010	6
2	Orión	3
4	Paraíso	2
1	Atlético Nacional	3
3	Colón C-3	5
2	Independiente	1
4	Coclé	0
1	Río Abajo	7

Semifinals (agg)
3	Veraguas 2010	2
1	Atlético Nacional	0
3	Colón C-3	4
1	Río Abajo	2

Final
3	Veraguas 2010	0
3	Colón C-3	2

==== Quarter-finals ====
===== Quarter-finals 1 =====
September 4, 2010
16:00 (UTC-5)

Colón C-3	3 – 0	Independiente
Vaughan; Racero	Report

Estadio Armando Dely Valdés, Colón

September 4, 2010
20:00 (UTC-5)

Veraguas 2010	4 – 2	Orión
Josue Brown; Mosquera	Report

Estadio Áristocles Castillo, Santiago

September 5, 2010
15:00 (UTC-5)

Coclé	0 – 5	Río Abajo
	Report

Estadio Virgilio Tejeira, Penonomé

September 5, 2010
18:30 (UTC-5)

Paraíso	1 – 0	Atlético Nacional
	Report

Cancha de Entrenamiento Luis Tapia, Panama City

===== Quarter-finals 2 =====
September 9, 2010
19:15 (UTC-5)

Río Abajo	2 – 0	Coclé
	Report

Cancha de Entrenamiento Luis Tapia, Panama City

September 10, 2010
19:00 (UTC-5)

Orión	1 – 2	Veraguas 2010
O. Mosquera	Report	(OG); J. Mosquera

Cancha de Entrenamiento Luis Tapia, Panama City

September 12, 2010
10:00 (UTC-5)

Atlético Nacional	3 – 1	Paraíso
	Report

Estadio Javier Cruz, Panama City

September 12, 2010
20:00 (UTC-5)

Independiente	1 – 2	Colón C-3
	Report	Racero; Argono

Estadio Agustín Sánchez, La Chorrera

==== Semifinals ====
===== Semifinals 1 =====
September 18, 2010
20:00 (UTC-5)

Veraguas 2010	0 – 0	Atlético Nacional
	Report

Estadio Áristocles Castillo, Santiago

September 19, 2010
16:00 (UTC-5)

Colón C-3	2 – 1	Río Abajo
Thomas; Hernández (OG)	Report	Girón

Estadio Armando Dely Valdés, Colón

===== Semifinals 2 =====
September 26, 2010
11:00 (UTC-5)

Atlético Nacional	0 – 2	Veraguas 2010
	Report	Mosquera

Estadio Javier Cruz, Panama City

September 30, 2010
15:00 (UTC-5)

Río Abajo	1 – 2	Colón C-3
Aguilar 83'	Report	34' Thomas; 65' Racero

Estadio Agustín Sánchez, La Chorrera

The original match between Río Abajo and Colón C-3 was played on September 26 at 19:00 (UTC-5) at Cancha de Entrenamiento Luis Tapia, but it was suspended at the 65th minute by the referee Luis Rodríguez because of violence in the stands perpetuated by the team's supporters. At the time of the suspension, Río Abajo was winning 1-0 but the rematch was scheduled to start from 0.

==== Final ====
16 October 2010
20:00 (UTC-5)

Veraguas 2010	0 – 2 (a.e.t.)	Colón C-3
	Report	Enrico Small 94' 111'

Estadio Rommel Fernández, Panama City
Referee: Jaffet Perea (Panama)

2010 Apertura Champion:
Colón C-3

=== Awards ===
==== Top goalscorers ====
Pos	Name	Club	Goals
1	(Panama) Enrico Small	Colón C-3	15
2	(Panama) Roberty Morales	Orión	14
3	(Panama) Josue Brown	Veraguas 2010	13
4	Domingo Rodríguez	Pan de Azúcar	11
5	(Colombia) John Freddy Mosquera	Veraguas 2010	10
6	Justo Carrillo	Paraíso	9
7	(Panama) Luis Jiménez	Atlético Nacional	8
8	(Panama) Andres Jiménez	Colón C-3	7

==== Most valuable player ====
Pos	Name	Club
1	(Panama) Enrico Small	Colón C-3

==== Best goalkeeper ====
Pos	Name	Club
1	Federico Ploche	Atlético Nacional
