= Bugaba District =

- District

- Location of the district capital in Panama
- Coordinates: 8°28′48″N 82°37′12″W
- Country: Panama
- Province: Chiriquí Province
- Capital: La Concepción

Area
  - Total: 341 sq mi (884 km^{2})

Population (2000)
  - Total: 68,570
- Time zone: UTC-5 (ETZ)

Bugaba District is a district in the Chiriquí Province of Panama. It covers an area of 517.3 km^{2} (199.7 sq mi) and has a population of 68,870 inhabitants as per the 2023 census. The district was created in 1863, with its capital at La Concepción.

== History ==
The Bugaba region hosted the indigenous settlement of Pueblo Viejo, which was destroyed in 1788 in the clashes between rival indigenous groups. It was later rebuilt in 1794 by Franciscan Catholic missionaries, who named it La Purísima Concepción de Bugaba, and the name Bugaba is derived from Bugabás or Bugabaes, the title bestowed on the indigenous chief of the settlement.

Bugaba District was created in 1863, with its capital at the city of La Concepción. On 13 September 2013, Tierras Altas District was carved out of the district by Law 55, consisting of the corregimientos of Cerro Punta, Cuesta de Piedra, Nueva California, Paso Ancho, and Volcán.

== Geography ==
Bugaba District is one of the 82 districts of Panama. It is part of the Chiriquí Province. It is spread over an area of 517.3 km^{2} (199.7 sq mi). It is a landlocked district located in the western part of Chiriquí Province, and borders the Alanje District to the south, Boquerón District to the east, and the districts of Renacimiento and Baru to the west. There are several rivers that flow through the district, which include Piedra, Mula, Guígala, Escarrea, Jacú, and Chiriquí Viejo. The district has a tropical climate with high rainfall. There are two distinct regions, and the average temperatures range from 15 to 24 °C (59 to 75 °F) in the highlands and 24 to 30 °C (75 to 86 °F) in the lowland areas.

== Administration and politics ==
The district is divided administratively into thirteen corregimientos–La Concepción, Aserrío de Gariché, Bugaba, El Bongo, Gómez, La Estrella, San Andrés, San Isidro, Santa Marta, Santa Rosa, Santo Domingo, Solano, and Sortová.

The National Assembly of Panama has 71 members, who are elected directly from single and multi-member constituencies. The district forms part of the Chiriquí Province, which elects three members to the National Assembly. The district forms part of the Chiriquí Province, which has seven electoral circuits, and elects 11 members to the National Assembly.

== Demographics and economy ==
As per the 2023 census, Bugaba District had a population of 68,870 inhabitants. The population increased from 57,141 in the 2010 census. The population consisted of 34,024 males and 34,846 females. About 16,386 (23.8%) of the inhabitants were below the age of 14 years and 8,396 inhabitants (12.2%) were above the age of 65 years. The majority (57.5%) of the population was classified as rural while the remaining 42.5% was classified as urban. Non-indigenous, non-Afro-descendant people (79.2%) formed the largest ethnic group in the district, followed by Afro-descendant people (12.6%) and Ngäbe people (7.7%).

In the central corregimientos of the district, agriculture and livestock rearing are the major economic activities. The corregimientos of La Concepción and Bugaba have several establishments that support commercial activities.
