= Cerro Punta =

Cerro Punta may refer to:

- Cerro Punta, Chiriquí, city in Panama
- Cerro de Punta, highest peak of Puerto Rico
