= Eupithecia ornea =

Scientific classification
- Domain: Eukaryota
- Kingdom: Animalia
- Phylum: Arthropoda
- Class: Insecta
- Order: Lepidoptera
- Family: Geometridae
- Genus: Eupithecia
- Species: E. ornea

Binomial name
- Eupithecia ornea H. Druce, 1893

Species of moth

Eupithecia ornea is a moth in the family Geometridae. It was described by Herbert Druce in 1893. It is known from Volcan de Chiriqui, Panama.

The wingspan is about 15 mm (6/10 in). The forewings and hindwings are pale brownish fawn, each crossed by indistinct pale lines.
