= Nueva California =

Nueva California may refer to:

- Alta California, a historical region of North America
- Nueva California, Chiriquí, Panama
