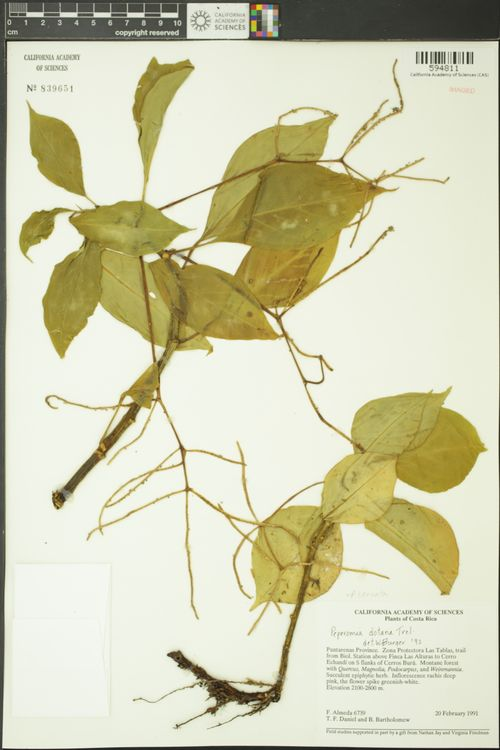

Scientific classification
- Kingdom: Plantae
- Clade: Embryophytes
- Clade: Tracheophytes
- Clade: Angiosperms
- Clade: Magnoliids
- Order: Piperales
- Family: Piperaceae
- Genus: Peperomia
- Species: P. ternata

Binomial name
- Peperomia ternata C.DC.

Synonyms
- Peperomia decurrens C.DC Peperomia allartii Trel. Peperomia durandii var. oligostachya C.DC.

= Peperomia ternata =

Species of flowering plant

Peperomia ternata is a species of hemiepiphytic subshrub from the genus Peperomia. It was first described by Casimir de Candolle and published in the book "Bulletin de l'Herbier Boissier 6(7): 509. 1898." It primarily grows in wet tropical biomes.

== Distribution ==
It is endemic to Central and Southern America. First specimens where found at an altitude of 1,900 meters (6,200 ft) in Tungurahua, Ecuador.

- Bolivia
  - Cochabamba
    - Chapare
    - Carrasco
  - La Paz
- Colombia
  - Valle del Cauca
  - Cauca
- Costa Rica
  - San José
    - Tarrazú
    - Pérez Zeledón
    - Acosta
    - Dota
  - Puntarenas
    - Corredores
    - Buenos Aires
  - Cartago
    - El Guarco
    - Oreamuno
    - Paraíso
  - Guanacaste
  - Limón
- Ecuador
  - Pichincha
    - Quito
  - Santo Domingo de los Tsáchilas
  - Cotopaxi
  - Napo
  - Manabi
  - Zamora-Chinchipe
  - Loja
- Nicaragua
  - Jinotega
  - Rivas
- Panama
  - Chiriqui
    - David
    - Boquete
    - Bugaba
  - Bocas del toro
- Peru
  - Upper Rio Comainas
  - Amazonas
- Venezuela
  - Miranda
  - Aragua
  - Lara
  - Táchira

== Description ==
The leaves are long-petiolate, elliptic-lanceolate, pointed at the apex, and glabrous on both sides. The central nerve, which extends to the apex at two-thirds of its length, sends alternate ascending nerves 7–8 on both sides. The common tip of the terminal peduncle is ternate, and its leaves are orbicular and ovary, emerging to half of their height above the stigmatic base.

Erect, glabrous, 3 mm-thick, dry, leathery stem Limbi in dry subpellucidum of membranous tissue, 9–11 cm in length and 4–5 cm in width About 2 cm long petioles. Each catenary is about 2 cm long, and common peduncles are around 8 1/2 cm long. The specimen contains a 5 cm juvenile densiflora catfish. 1 1/2 mm in length. dense Slightly impressed ovary rhachis with a strongly pointed but non-scaly apex. Stigma minutely papilllose, meaty.
