= Colón C-3 F.C. =

Panamanian football club

Colón C-3
- Full name: Colón C-3 Fútbol Club
- Founded: 9 March 2010
- Ground: Estadio Espinar; Colón, Panama
- Manager: Carlos Miranda
- League: Liga Panameña de Fútbol
- 2011 (C): Quarterfinals; 1st (Group A) (promoted)
Home colours	Away colours

Colón C-3 Fútbol Club is a Panamanian football team playing at the Liga Panameña de Fútbol. It is based in Colón and it was founded on March 9, 2010.

== History ==
The club was created in 2010 as part of the Liga Nacional de Ascenso expansion project for the 2010–11 season. During their first season in the second division they were able to qualify to the promotion playoff against SUNTRACS after defeating Veraguas 2010 2–0 in the 2010 Apertura final. On May 28, 2011, Colón C-3 defeated SUNTRACS 2–0 and became the fifth team from the Colón Province to play in the Liga Panameña de Fútbol. In June 2011 they won their first game in their LPF history, beating Atlético Chiriquí 2–1.

Their return to the second division was confirmed in April 2012. In May 2015, Colón C-3 reached the final of the 2015 Clausura, but lost 2–1 to SUNTRACS to miss out on a place in the promotion playoff.

== Honours ==
- Liga Nacional de Ascenso: 1

2010–11

== Historical list of coaches ==
- (Colombia) Carlos Miranda (October 2010– Jun 2012)
- (El Salvador) Ángel Orellana (Jun 2012 – Aug 2012)
- (Colombia) Carlos Miranda (August 2012–)
- (Colombia) Elkin Ortíz (?? – Mar 2014)
- (Colombia) Carlos Miranda (March 2014–)
