= Chiriquí =

Chiriquí refers to one of the following, in or around Panama:

- Chiriquí Province, a province of Panama
- Chiriquí, Chiriquí, a corregimiento in Chiriquí Province
- Chiriquí River, a river in its eponymous province
- Gulf of Chiriquí, a gulf in its eponymous province
- Chiriqui culture, a Pre-Columbian civilization that inhabited this province
