= Tierras Altas District =

Coordinates: 8.772°N 82.639°W

- District
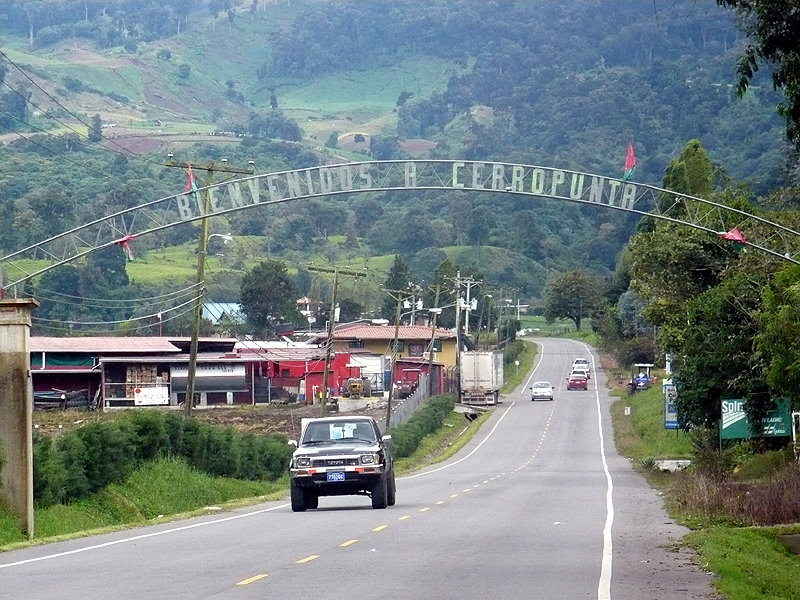

- Location of the district capital in Panama
- Country: Panama
- Province: Chiriquí Province
- Established: 2013

Area
  - Total: 359.8 km^{2} (138.9 sq mi)

Population (2023)
  - Total: 23,525
- Time zone: UTC-5 (ETZ)

Tierras Altas District is a district in the Chiriquí Province of Panama. It covers an area of 359.8 km^{2} (138.9 sq mi) and has a population of 23,525 inhabitants as per the 2023 census. It was created on 13 September 2013, consisting of five corregimientos of the erstwhile Bugaba District, and is the fourteenth and youngest district of the province.

== History ==
Tierras Altas District was created as the fourteenth and youngest district of Chiriquí Province by Law 55 of 13 September 2013, consisting of five corregimientos of the erstwhile Bugaba District. It was slated to come into effect from 2 May 2019, which was then advanced to 1 July 2017, by Law 22 enacted on 9 May 2017.

== Geography ==
Tierras Altas District is one of the 82 districts of Panama. It is spread over an area of 359.8 km^{2} (138.9 sq mi). The district predominantly has an elevated terrain and its principal rivers include Chiriquí, Colorado, Mirador, Brazo de Gariché, Catalina, and Los Pozos. The Salto del Tigre (Tiger waterfall) is a 75 m (246 ft) tall waterfall formed by the Río Colorado near Volcán. The economy is mostly dependent on agriculture and its allied industries.

== Administration and politics ==
Tierras Altas District has its capital at the city of Volcán. It is divided administratively into five corregimientos–Volcán, Cerro Punta, Cuesta de Piedra, Nueva California, and Paso Ancho.

The National Assembly of Panama has 71 members, who are elected directly from single and multi-member constituencies. The district forms part of the Chiriquí Province, which elects three members to the National Assembly. The district forms part of the Chiriquí Province, which has seven electoral circuits, and elects 11 members to the National Assembly.

== Demographics ==
As per the 2023 census, Tierras Altas District had a population of 23,525 inhabitants. The population increased from 21,068 in the 2010 census. The population consisted of 12,268 males and 11,257 females. About 6,460 (27.5%) of the inhabitants were below the age of 14 years and 2,019 inhabitants (8.6%) were above the age of 65 years. The majority (53.1%) of the population was classified as urban while the remaining 46.9% was classified as rural. Non-indigenous, non-Afro-descendant people (55.4%) formed the largest ethnic group in the district, followed by Ngäbe people (31.6%) and Afro-descendant people (12.2%).
