= Santo Domingo, Chiriquí =

Coordinates: 8.5000°N 82.7167°W

Santo Domingo
- Corregimiento
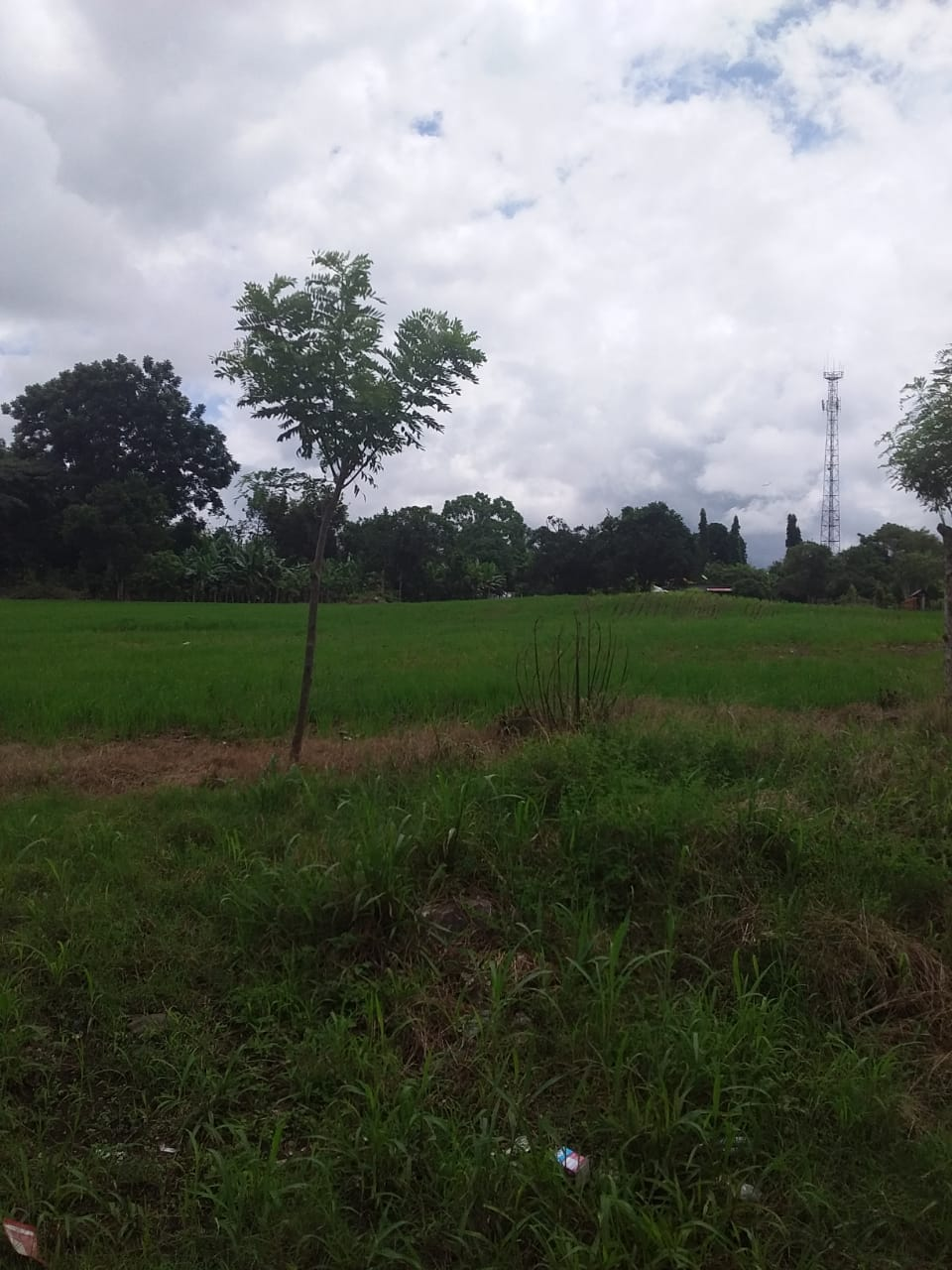
- Campo en Santo Domingo, Bugaba

- Location within Panama
- Country: Panama
- Province: Chiriquí
- District: Bugaba

Area
  - Land: 50.9 km^{2} (19.7 sq mi)

Population (2010)
  - Total: 2,625
  - Density: 51.5/km^{2} (133/sq mi)
- Population density calculated based on land area.
- Time zone: UTC−5 (EST)

Santo Domingo is a corregimiento in Bugaba District, Chiriquí Province, Panama. It has a land area of 50.9 square kilometres (19.7 sq mi) and had a population of 2,625 as of 2010, giving it a population density of 51.5 inhabitants per square kilometre (133/sq mi). Its population as of 1990 was 1,988; its population as of 2000 was 2,276.
