= Aserrío de Gariché =

- Corregimiento
- Interactive map of Aserrío de Gariché
- Location within Panama
- Coordinates: 8°29′N 82°48′W
- Country: Panama
- Province: Chiriquí
- District: Bugaba

Area
  - Land: 98.8 km^{2} (38.1 sq mi)

Population (2010)
  - Total: 11,072
  - Density: 112.1/km^{2} (290/sq mi)
- Population density calculated based on land area.
- Time zone: UTC−5 (EST)

Aserrío de Gariché is a corregimiento in Bugaba District, Chiriquí Province, Panama. It has a land area of 98.8 square kilometres (38.1 sq mi) and had a population of 11,072 as of 2010, giving it a population density of 112.1 inhabitants per square kilometre (290/sq mi). Its population as of 1990 was 8,126; its population as of 2000 was 9,326.
