= Gómez, Chiriquí =

Coordinates: 8.5657°N 82.7388°W

Gómez
- Corregimiento
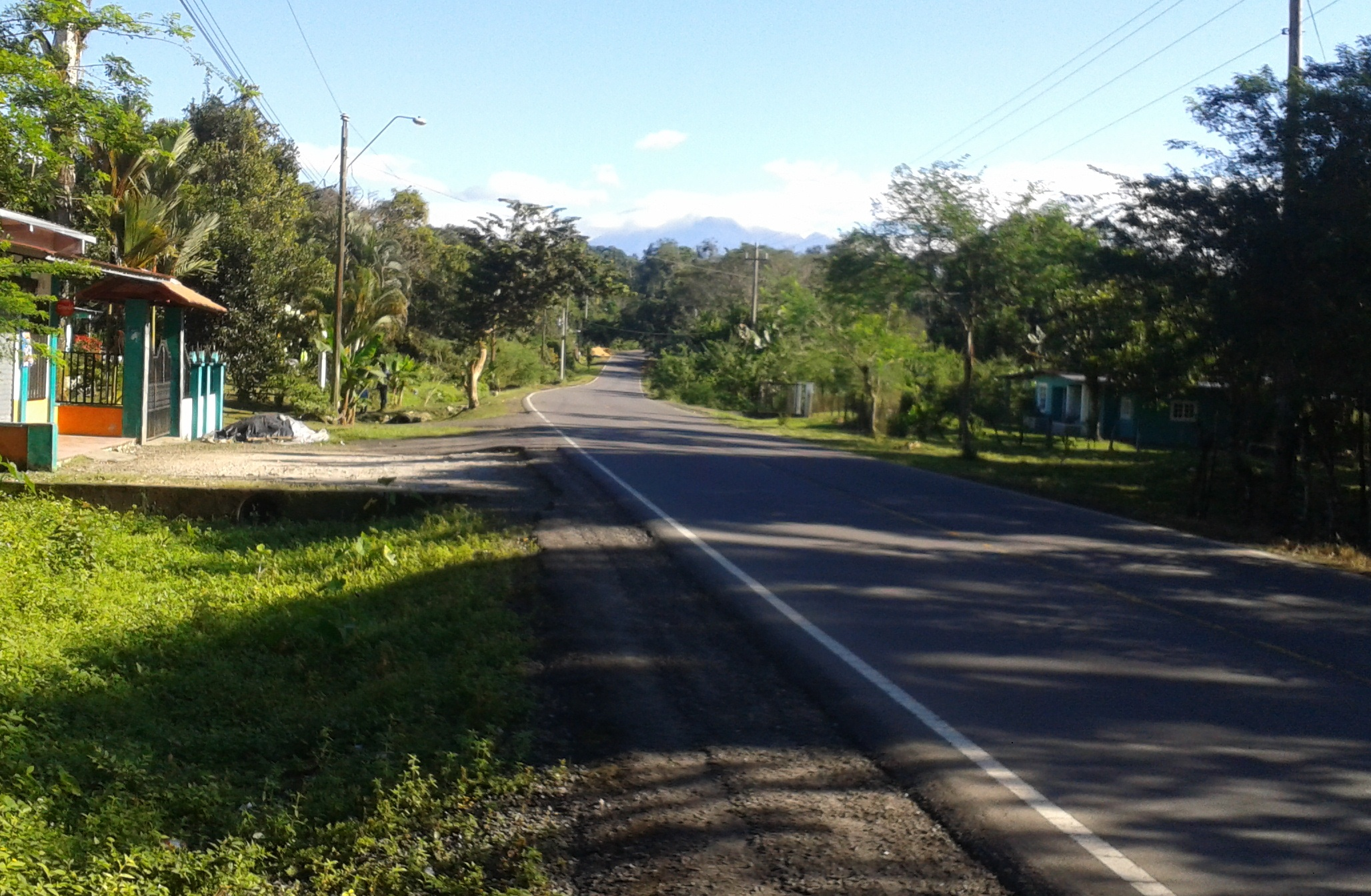
- Gomez, Bugaba, Chiriqui. Road to San Andrés in the way on Gomez, Panama

- Location within Panama
- Country: Panama
- Province: Chiriquí
- District: Bugaba

Area
  - Land: 40.8 km^{2} (15.8 sq mi)

Population (2010)
  - Total: 2,702
  - Density: 66.2/km^{2} (171/sq mi)
- Population density calculated based on land area.
- Time zone: UTC−5 (EST)

Gómez is a corregimiento in Bugaba District, Chiriquí Province, Panama. It has a land area of 40.8 square kilometres (15.8 sq mi) and had a population of 2,702 as of 2010, giving it a population density of 66.2 inhabitants per square kilometre (171/sq mi). Its population as of 1990 was 2,468; its population as of 2000 was 2,422.
