= Veraguas Club Deportivo =

Panamanian football club

Veraguas C.D.
- Full name: Vergauas Club Deportivo
- Founded: 2005
- Ground: Estadio Áristocles Castillo
- Owner: (Spain) Joaquín Zulategui
- Chairman: (Spain) Manuel Mirambel
- Manager: (Spain) Isaac Jové Rubí
- League: Liga Panameña de Fútbol
- Website: https://www.veraguasunitedfc.com/
Home colours	Away colours	Third colours

Veraguas C.D. is a Panamanian football team playing at the Liga Panameña de Fútbol. It is based in Santiago de Veraguas and it has been in the LPF League since the 2021 season, part of the league's twelve team expansion project.

== History ==
The club was founded in 2005 by the Sindicato Único Nacional de Trabajadores de la Industria de la Construcción y Similares de Panamá (SUNTRACS).

In 2010 SUNTRACS was promoted to the Liga Nacional de Ascenso after defeating Los Pumas 5–0 in the Copa Rommel Fernández final. During their first season in the second division they were able to play the promotion playoff against Colón C-3 after defeating Independiente in penalties during the 2011 Clausura final. Unfortunately for the sindicalistas, they were defeated 2–0 and remained in the second division. They were 2014 Apertura champions, but in summer 2015 they were again beaten in the overall championship final, losing 3–0 to Atlético Nacional.

SUNTRACS's crest in 2009

== Honours ==
- Liga Nacional de Ascenso: 0

Runner-up (1): 2010–11

- Copa Rommel Fernández: 1

2010

== List of coaches ==
- (Spain) Isaac Jové (January 2021 – present)
- (Panama) José Anthony Torres ( – March 2022)
- (Argentina) Daniel Lanata (March 2022 – June 2022)
- (Paraguay) Héctor Blanco (July 2022 – September 2022)
- (Panama) Marcos Pimentel (September 2022 - June 2024)
- (Colombia) Gonzalo Soto (July 2024 - 'Present)

== Futsal ==
SUNTRACS also has a futsal team that plays in the Liga Elite de Fútbol Sala de Panamá (LEFP) where it enjoys a lot of success.
