= Chiriquí Occidente F.C. =

Panamanian football club

Chiriquí Occidente
- Full name: Chiriquí Occidente Fútbol Club
- Founded: 2010
- Ground: Estadio Glorias Deportivas Baruenses; Puerto Armuelles, Panama
- League: Liga Nacional de Ascenso
Home colours	Away colours

Chiriquí Occidente Fútbol Club is a Panamanian football team playing at the Liga Nacional de Ascenso. It is based in Puerto Armuelles, Chiriquí.

== History ==
The club was created in 2010 as part of the Liga Nacional de Ascenso expansion project for the 2010–11 season.
