= Volcán Barú =

Highest mountain in Panama

Barú
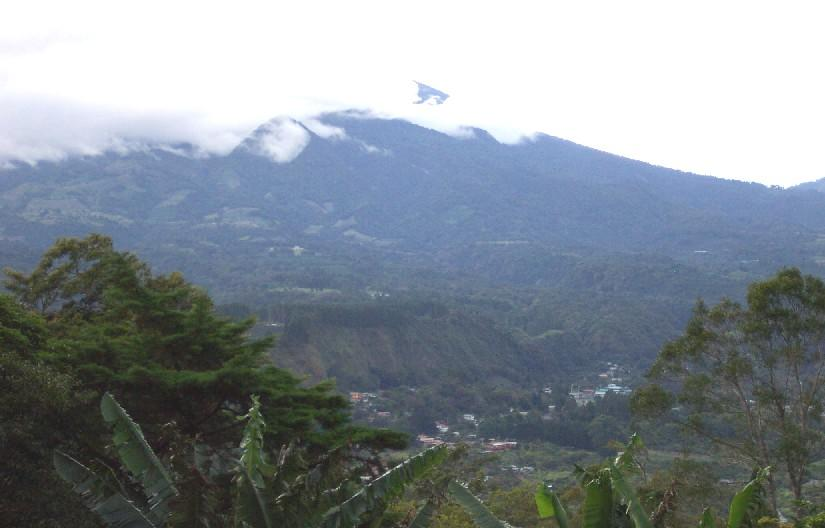
- Volcán Barú and the mountain city of Boquete

Highest point
- Elevation: 3,475 m (11,401 ft)
- Prominence: 1,354 m (4,442 ft)
- Parent peak: Cerro Kamuk
- Isolation: 73.9 km (45.9 mi)
- Listing: Country high point; Volcanoes of Panama
- Coordinates: 8°48′31.72″N 82°32′32.42″W

Geography
- Location within Panama
- Country: Panama
- Parent range: Talamanca Range

Geology
- Mountain type: Stratovolcano
- Volcanic arc: Central America Volcanic Arc
- Last eruption: 1550 ± 10 years

The Volcán Barú is an active stratovolcano and the tallest mountain in Panama, at 3,475 metres (11,401 ft) high. It lies about 35 km (22 mi) off the border of Costa Rica. It is also the twelfth highest peak in Central America.

Due to its height and the narrowness of the isthmus of Panama, it is possible (though relatively rare) to see both the Pacific Ocean and Caribbean Sea from Volcán Barú's peak on a clear day.

== Geography ==
The small town of Volcán at the base of Volcán Barú sits on the remnants of a huge lahar that appears to have breached the caldera. A small river has eroded the lahar exposing an ancient forest below dated to about 1000 years old.

Volcán Barú is surrounded by a fertile area of cool highlands drained by the Chiriquí Viejo and Caldera Rivers. The towns of Volcán and Cerro Punta can be found on its western side, while Boquete is on the eastern flank.

The occasional fall of hail or ice pellets has been reported on the summit, where the minimum temperature can be below 0 °C (32 °F) and the formation of frost is frequent during the dry season. The peak is host to a large installation of broadcast towers.

== Description ==
De Boer et al. were the first to show that El Barú volcano is active and part of the extension of the Central American Volcanic Arc in Panama. Further detailed work on the geochemistry of the lavas from El Barú and other volcanoes in Panama was completed by Defant et al. They substantiated, based on geochemistry, that the lavas were derived by subduction (calc-alkaline). Radiometric dates also showed that the volcanism falls into two groups that range from 20 million years to recent. They also showed that the youngest volcanism consists primarily of adakites (partial melts from the subducted slab) whereas the older volcanism is normal calc-alkaline lavas.

USGS Volcano-Hazards Assessment Study

In 2006, an earthquake swarm was registered in the Volcán Barú area. This was not the first one; researchers cite at least three other seismic events of the same nature recorded in the recent past (1930, 1965, 1985).

In 2007, the U.S. Geological Survey (USGS), in cooperation with Panama's Science, Technology and Innovation Secretariat (SENACYT) and the U.S. Agency for International Development (USAID), published a study on different aspects of Volcán Barú. The 33-page report outlined potential hazard areas, rock composition, and areas affected by previous eruptions; there is evidence that during the last eruption, which occurred in the 16th century, the debris avalanche deposits covered a volume of 20 to 30 km^{3}, reaching as far as the Pacific Ocean (the largest documented in Central America and nearly 10 times the area covered by the Mt. St. Helens debris avalanche in 1980).

Data collected at several locations from four previous eruptions which occurred during the last 1600 years indicate that a new eruption would last several years, putting at risk population and costly infrastructure in the areas surrounding the volcano. Typical events during such volcanic episodes include pyroclastic flows, super-heated gas clouds rapidly descending the volcano's east flank, conceivably reaching as far as Boquete, Alto Boquete, and the Caldera River, and fallout of ash and other particles ranging in size from dust to 1-meter blocks, known as tephra, causing fires, roof collapses, water contamination, crop damage and eye and lung irritation, especially among elders and infants. A third type of event, mud and debris flows, known as lahars, create landslides, obstruct rivers courses, and could have long-term effects in the zone. The severity of these events is directly related to the lava flows and their interaction with underground water deposits.

A comprehensive set of maps is included with the study, clearly showing the most likely affected areas in Boquete, Volcán, Bambito and other towns in vicinity of the Volcán Barú. The study recommends local authorities should make the population aware of the potential risks, and create a response system in preparation for the eventual onset of an eruptive episode.

== National park ==
The volcano was declared Volcán Barú National Park in 1976, with an area of 14,325 ha (35,400 acres). It is a part of the Mesoamerican Biological Corridor. Fauna include the black guan, black-and-white hawk-eagle, Underwood's water mouse, volcano junco, wrenthrush, and yellow-thighed brushfinch. Over 250 species of birds have been identified within the park, and all five species of big cats live here as well. The national park protects a range of habitat, including humid montane forests, low humid montane forests, and montane rainforests.

The park's most popular hiking trail is the Sendero Los Quetzales (Los Quetzales Trail), which connects Boquete with Cerro Punta and wraps around the side of the volcano. The trail takes around 6 hours to hike. There is another trail to the top of the volcano, but this is long, steep and strenuous. There are also jeep tours that go to the summit if one doesn't want to hike. Both the Pacific Ocean and Caribbean Sea can be seen from the summit on a clear day.

== Gallery ==
Volcán Barú on a clear morning; the heart-like shape at the upper right slope is a cattle farm exploitation.

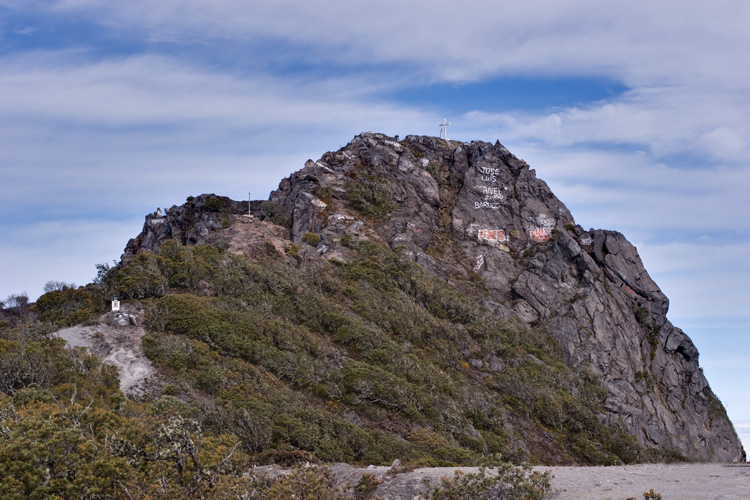
Volcán Barú Summit

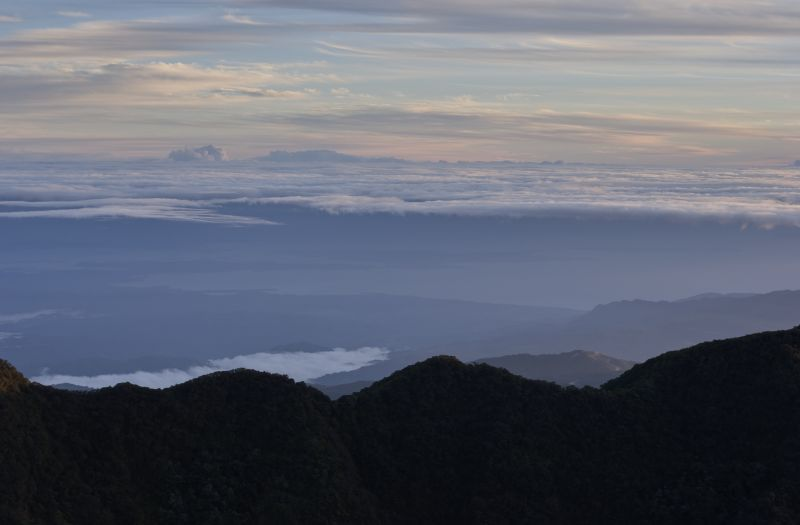
The Caribbean Sea, visible from the summit of Volcán Barú. Taken early in the morning, as clouds usually obstruct the view.

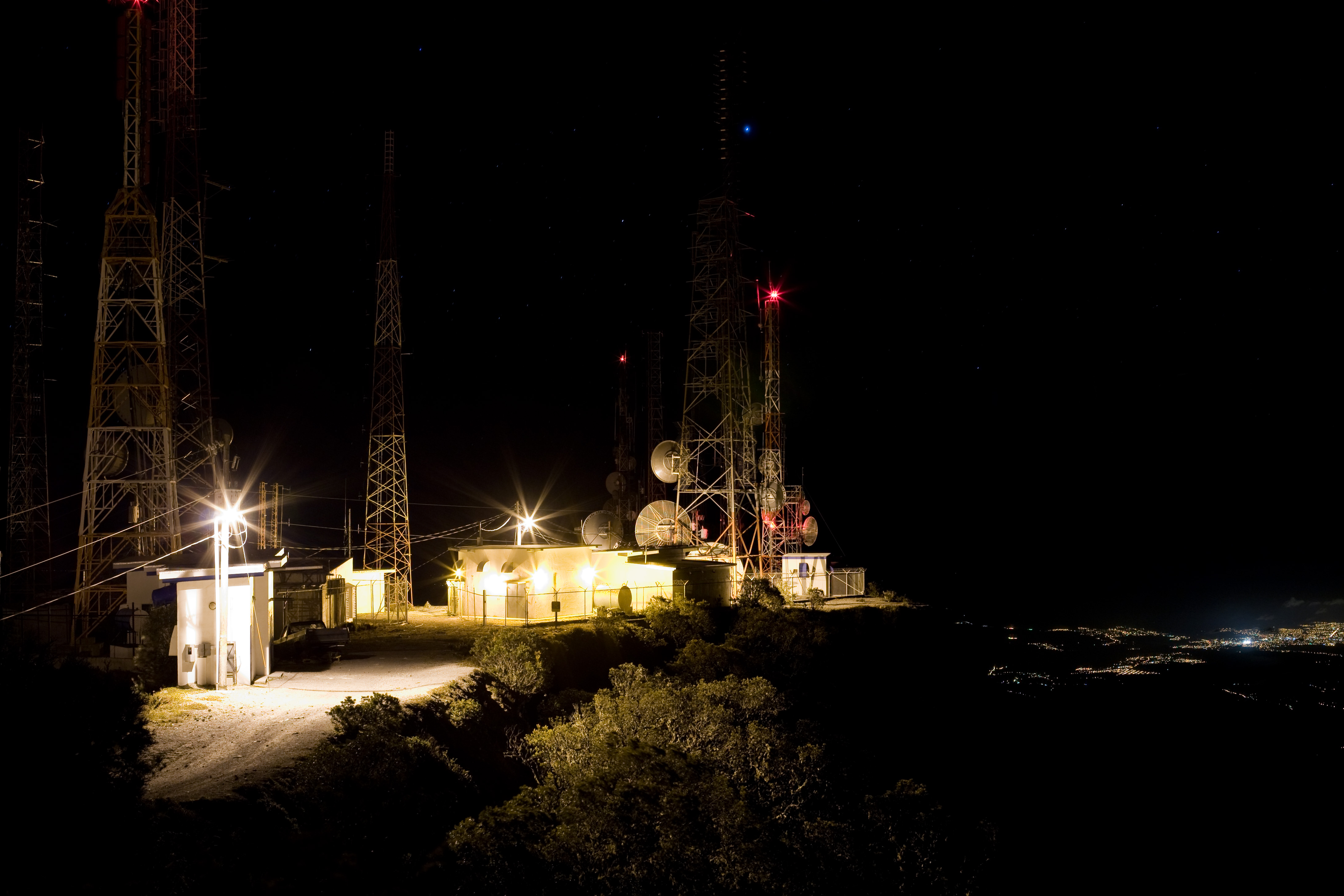
View from the summit of Volcán Barú. This photo shows the antenna and support buildings. Visible in the background are the lights of city of David, Chiriquí.

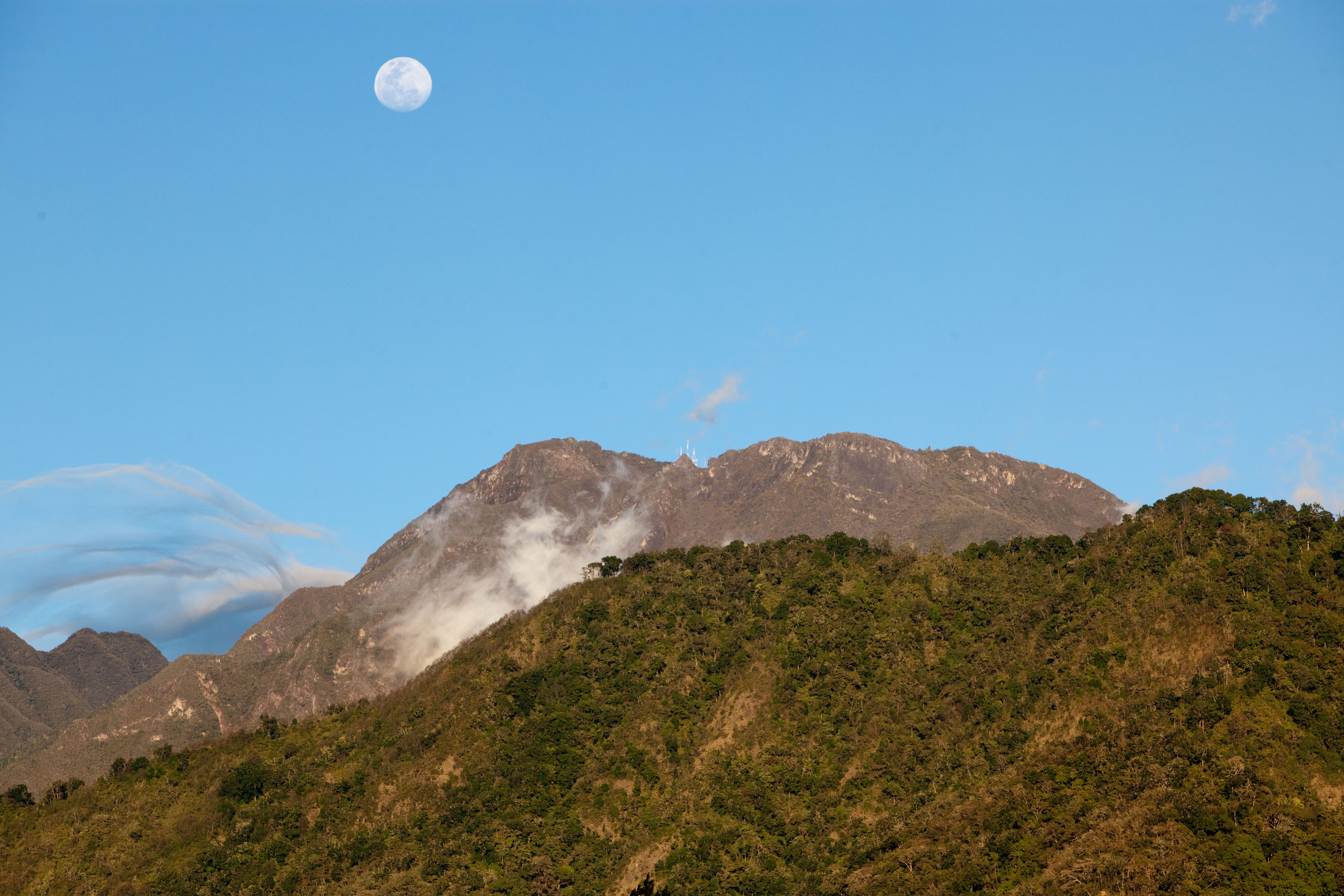
Taken in front of the Cerro Brujo Cafe. The cross on the summit of Volcán Barú is just visible.

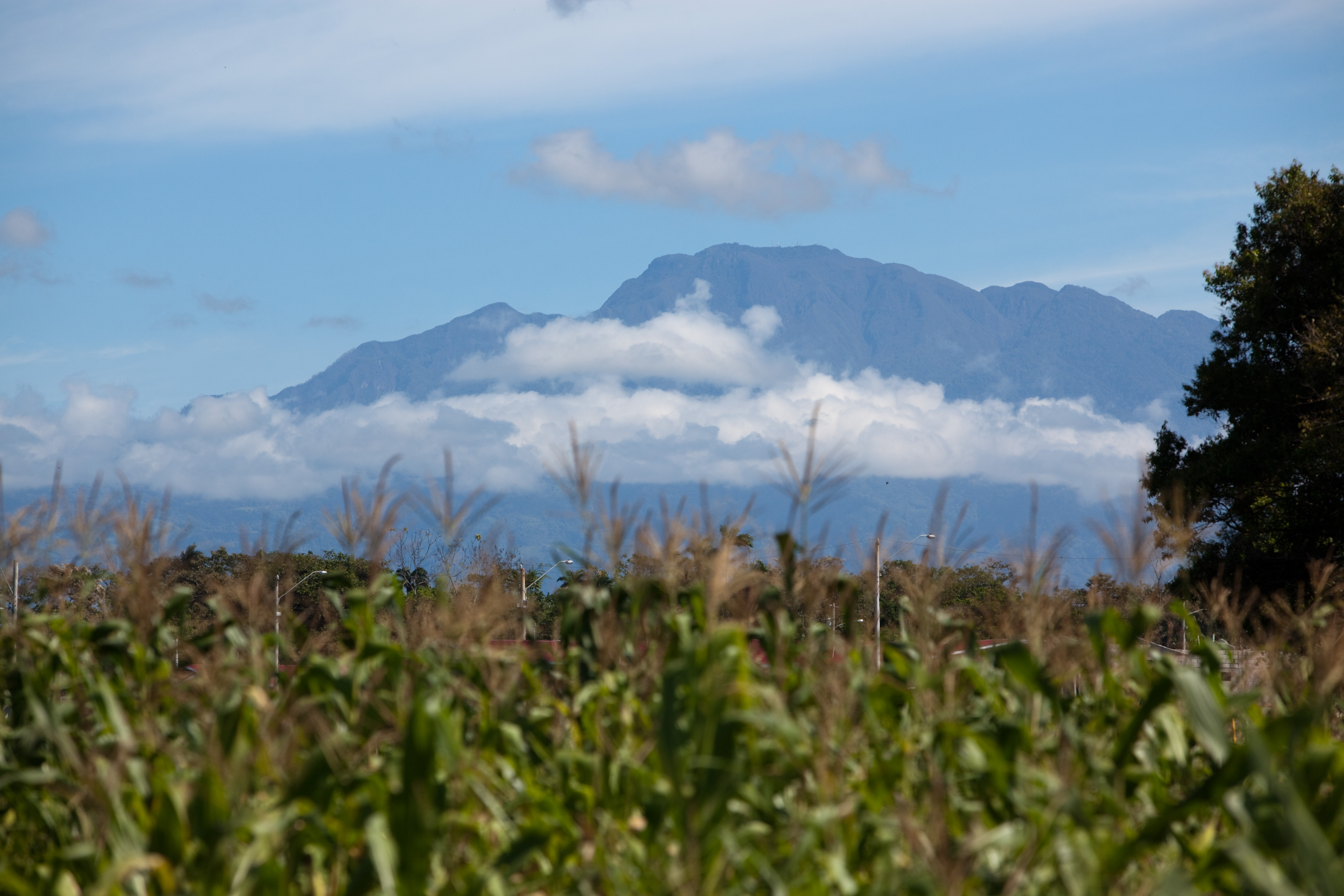
Shot a few miles away from the Pacific Coast of Panamá, this shows a partially cloudy Volcán Barú.

Volcán Barú at sunset, as seen from Boquete, Chiriquí

== See also ==
- Protected areas of Panama
