= La Estrella, Chiriquí =

Coordinates: 8.5200°N 82.6709°W

La Estrella
- Corregimiento
- Location within Panama
- Country: Panama
- Province: Chiriquí
- District: Bugaba

Area
  - Land: 51.9 km^{2} (20.0 sq mi)

Population (2010)
  - Total: 4,665
  - Density: 90/km^{2} (230/sq mi)
- Population density calculated based on land area.
- Time zone: UTC−5 (EST)

La Estrella is a corregimiento in Bugaba District, Chiriquí Province, Panama. It has a land area of 51.9 square kilometres (20.0 sq mi) and had a population of 4,665 as of 2010, giving it a population density of 90 inhabitants per square kilometre (230/sq mi). Its population as of 1990 was 3,721; its population as of 2000 was 4,433.
