= Santa Rosa, Chiriquí =

Coordinates: 8.6000°N 82.6833°W

Santa Rosa
- Corregimiento
- Location within Panama
- Country: Panama
- Province: Chiriquí
- District: Bugaba

Area
  - Land: 48 km^{2} (19 sq mi)

Population (2010)
  - Total: 1,510
  - Density: 31.4/km^{2} (81/sq mi)
- Population density calculated based on land area.
- Time zone: UTC−5 (EST)

Santa Rosa is a corregimiento in Bugaba District, Chiriquí Province, Panama. It has a land area of 48 square kilometres (19 sq mi) and had a population of 1,510 as of 2010, giving it a population density of 31.4 inhabitants per square kilometre (81/sq mi). Its population as of 1990 was 1,337; its population as of 2000 was 1,407.
