= El Bongo =

Coordinates: 8.5833°N 82.6167°W

- Corregimiento
- Location within Panama
- Country: Panama
- Province: Chiriquí
- District: Bugaba
- Established: March 7, 1997

Area
  - Land: 41.9 km^{2} (16.2 sq mi)

Population (2010)
  - Total: 1,448
  - Density: 34.6/km^{2} (90/sq mi)
- Population density calculated based on land area.
- Time zone: UTC−5 (EST)

El Bongo is a corregimiento in Bugaba District, Chiriquí Province, Panama. It has a land area of 41.9 square kilometres (16.2 sq mi) and had a population of 1,448 as of 2010, giving it a population density of 34.6 inhabitants per square kilometre (90/sq mi). It was created by Law 10 of March 7, 1997; this measure was complemented by Law 5 of January 19, 1998 and Law 69 of October 28, 1998. Its population as of 2000 was 1,406.
