= 2010 Copa Rommel Fernández =

Copa Rommel Fernández
- Season: 2010

The Copa Rommel Fernández 2010 season (officially "XIV Copa Rommel Fernández") started on January 10, 2010.

== 2010 teams ==
=== Zone 1 ===
Club	City	Qualified as
Deportivo Cali	Colón	Colón 1
Deportivo El Valle	Arraiján	West Panamá 1
Navy Bay	Colón	Colón 2
Santa Fe	Santa Fe	Darién 2
SUNTRACS F.C.	San Miguelito	East Panamá 1
Paraíso F.C.	Arraiján	East Panamá 2

=== Zone 2 ===
Club	City	Qualified as
Atlético Darién		Darién 1
La Primavera	Santiago	Veraguas 1
Los Pumas	Penonomé	Coclé 1
Río de Jesús F.C.	Río de Jesús	Veraguas 2
San Antonio	Penonomé	Coclé 2
Santa Gema	Arraiján	West Panama 2

=== Zone 3 ===
Club	City	Qualified as
Club 20-30	Santiago	Veraguas 2008 champion
Llano Rio	La Villa	Los Santos 2
Los Milagros F.C.	Chitré	Herrera 2
Niupy	Macaracas	Los Santos Campeon
Monagrillo F.C.	Chitré	Herrera 1

=== Zone 4 ===
Club	City	Qualified as
Deportivo Bades	David	Chiriquí 1
Atlético Bocas Isla	Bocas del Toro	Bocas del Toro 2
Deportivo Los Halcones	Changuinola	Bocas del Toro 1
Majagua	Progreso	Occidental Chiriquí 1
Malca F.C.	Progreso	Occidental Chiriquí 2
San José F.C.	David	Chiriquí 2

== Regular round ==
=== Zone 1 ===
Team	Pld	W	D	L	GF	GA	GD	Pts
Deportivo Cali	5	4	1	0	6	1	5	13
SUNTRACS	5	3	0	2	9	7	2	9
Navy Bay	5	2	1	2	8	4	4	7
Santa Fe	5	2	0	3	8	10	-2	6
Deportivo El Valle	5	1	1	3	7	11	-4	4
Paraíso	5	0	2	3	4	7	-3	2

Qualified to the final round.

10 January 2010
Deportivo Cali	3-1	Santa Fe
SUNTRACS	2-1	El Valle
Navy Bay	1-1	Paraíso

=== Zone 2 ===
Team	Pld	W	D	L	GF	GA	GD	Pts
Santa Gema	5	4	1	0	13	3	10	13
Los Pumas	5	3	0	2	14	7	7	9
San Antonio	5	3	0	2	10	6	4	9
Río de Jesús	5	1	2	2	5	6	-1	5
Atlético Darién	5	1	1	3	4	23	-19	4
La Primavera	5	1	0	4	5	10	-5	3

Qualified to the final round.

10 January 2010
Los Pumas	0-2	Río de Jesús
Atlético Darién	3-1	La Primavera
Santa Gema	3-0	San Antonio
17 January 2010
Primavera Fc	1-0	Río de Jesús

=== Zone 3 ===
Team	Pld	W	D	L	GF	GA	GD	Pts
Los Milagros	4	2	2	0	5	3	2	8
Club 20-30	4	2	1	1	5	2	3	7
Llano Río	4	1	2	1	5	4	1	5
Niupy	4	1	2	1	7	8	-1	5
Monagrillo	4	0	1	3	3	8	-5	1

Qualified to the final round.

10 January 2010
Club 20-30	1-1	Niupy
Monagrillo	1-1	Llano Río

=== Zone 4 ===
Team	Pld	W	D	L	GF	GA	GD	Pts
Malca	4	4	0	0	8	2	6	12
Majagua	4	2	1	1	9	6	3	7
Deportivo Los Halcones	4	1	2	1	10	6	4	5
San José	4	1	1	2	8	11	-3	4
Deportivo Bades	4	0	2	2	5	9	-4	2
Atlético Bocas Isla	4	0	2	2	4	10	-6	2

Qualified to the final round.

10 January 2010
Bades	2-2	Bocas Isla
Los Halcones	1-2	Malca
Majagua	4-3	San José
