= Sortová =

- Corregimiento
- Location within Panama
- Coordinates: 8°33′0″N 82°39′0″W
- Country: Panama
- Province: Chiriquí
- District: Bugaba

Area
  - Land: 33.4 km^{2} (12.9 sq mi)

Population (2010)
  - Total: 2,440
  - Density: 73/km^{2} (190/sq mi)
- Population density calculated based on land area.
- Time zone: UTC−5 (EST)

Sortová is a corregimiento in Bugaba District, Chiriquí Province, Panama. It has a land area of 33.4 square kilometres (12.9 sq mi) and had a population of 2,440 as of 2010, giving it a population density of 73 inhabitants per square kilometre (190/sq mi). Its population as of 1990 was 2,064; its population as of 2000 was 2,183.
