= San Andrés, Chiriquí =

Coordinates: 8.6003°N 82.7242°W

San Andrés
- Corregimiento
- Location within Panama
- Country: Panama
- Province: Chiriquí
- District: Bugaba

Area
  - Land: 65.2 km^{2} (25.2 sq mi)

Population (2010)
  - Total: 2,523
  - Density: 38.7/km^{2} (100/sq mi)
- Population density calculated based on land area.
- Time zone: UTC−5 (EST)

San Andrés is a corregimiento in Bugaba District, Chiriquí Province, Panama. It has a land area of 65.2 square kilometres (25.2 sq mi) and had a population of 2,523 as of 2010, giving it a population density of 38.7 inhabitants per square kilometre (100/sq mi). Its population as of 1990 was 2,451; its population as of 2000 was 2,526.
