= Estadio Áristocles Castillo =

Football stadium in Peru

- Toco
- Interactive map of Estadio Áristocles Castillo
- Location: Santiago, Veraguas, Panama
- Coordinates: 8°6′32″N 80°58′22″W
- Capacity: 2,500
- Surface: Artificial turf
- Field size: 101x68 m

Construction
- Renovated: 2009

Tenants
- Atlético Veragüense; Veraguas Club Deportivo

Estadio Áristocles Toco Castillo is a football stadium in Santiago de Veraguas, Panama which hosts Liga Profesional de Fútbol teams Atlético Veragüense, Veraguas Club Deportivo, and other teams and local competitions from the Veraguas Province.

Formerly the stadium had smaller dimensions and natural turf, but it was still used for ANAPROF games. In 2008, a joint effort from the Panamanian government and the national sport institute (INDE) spent $449,104 in installing artificial turf to the field and increase its dimensions to 101x68 m.

The stadium was inaugurated on January 18, 2009 and the first Liga Panameña de Fútbol game in the renewed stadium was played on Sunday March 1, 2009 when Atlético Veragüense defeated Alianza 4-3 in the 2009 championship. The first goal in the renewed stadium was scored by Abdul Pinto of Alianza.

The stadium was inaugurated again February 17, 2025. As of 2025 the new stadium can now hold about 2,700 spectators.
