= F.C. Veraguas 2010 =

Panamanian football club

Veraguas 2010
- Full name: Fútbol Club Veraguas 2010
- Founded: 2010
- Dissolved: 2011
- Ground: Estadio Aristocles Castillo; Santiago de Veraguas, Panama
- Capacity: 2,000
- Chairman: Jairo Batista
- Manager: Boris Ábrego
- League: Liga Nacional de Ascenso
- 2011 (C): Semifinals; 1st (Group B)
| Home colours | Away colours |

Fútbol Club Veraguas 2010 was a Panamanian football team playing at the Liga Nacional de Ascenso. It was based in Santiago de Veraguas and competed only for one season.

== History ==
The club was created in 2010 as part of the Liga Nacional de Ascenso expansion project for the 2010–11 season with the collaboration of the Liga Provincial de Fútbol de Veraguas and Ernesto Meke Núñez. The team fold after their first season, however the city of Santiago will have a new team for the next Liga Nacional de Ascenso season, since Atlético Veragüense was relegated from the Panamanian first division.

=== Apertura 2010 ===
On the first round finished third of Group B, advancing to playoffs. On playoffs beat A.D. Orion on quarter-finals and Atlético Nacional on semi-finals, losing to Colón C3 in the Final match by 2–0.

=== Clausura 2011 ===
The team advanced to playoffs again, beating A.D. Orión in quarter-finals 1-0 (agg) and losing to Atlético Nacional 3-2 (agg) on semi-finals.
