= Bugaba (corregimiento) =

Coordinates: 8.4797°N 82.6200°W

- Corregimiento
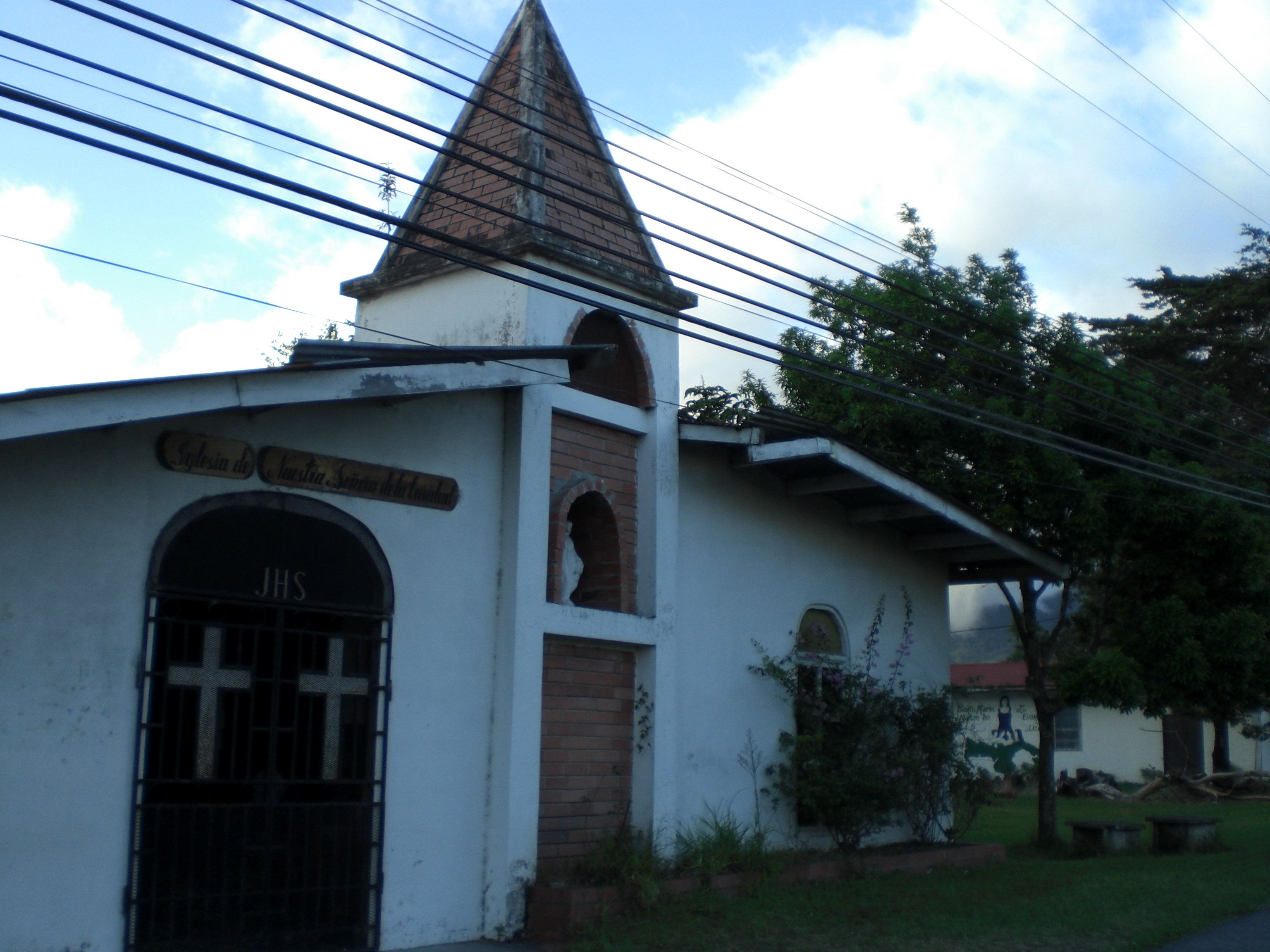
- Nuestra Señora de la Caridad church in Bugaba

- Location within Panama
- Country: Panama
- Province: Chiriquí
- District: Bugaba

Area
  - Land: 12.9 km^{2} (5.0 sq mi)

Population (2010)
  - Total: 3,718
  - Density: 288.6/km^{2} (747/sq mi)
- Population density calculated based on land area.
- Time zone: UTC−5 (EST)

Bugaba is a corregimiento in Bugaba District, Chiriquí Province, Panama. It has a land area of 12.9 square kilometres (5.0 sq mi) and had a population of 3,718 as of 2010, giving it a population density of 288.6 inhabitants per square kilometre (747/sq mi). Its population as of 1990 was 1,989; its population as of 2000 was 2,817.
