= Volcán, Panama =

Volcán
- Town and corregimiento
- Location within Panama
- Coordinates: 8°46′44.3″N 82°38′39.3″W
- Country: Panama
- Province: Chiriquí
- District: Tierras Altas

Area
  - Land: 233.7 km^{2} (90.2 sq mi)

Population (2010)
  - Total: 12,717
  - Density: 54.4/km^{2} (141/sq mi)
- Population density calculated based on land area.
- Time zone: UTC−5 (EST)
- Climate: Am

Volcán is a town and corregimiento in Tierras Altas District, Chiriquí Province, Panama. It has a land area of 233.7 square kilometres (90.2 sq mi) and had a population of 12,717 as of 2010, giving it a population density of 54.4 inhabitants per square kilometre (141/sq mi). Its population as of 1990 was 7,146; its population as of 2000 was 10,188.

Volcan sits on an old lava flow from Volcán Barú, the highest point in Panama at 3,475 metres (11,460 feet). The low range of mountains to the south of Volcan were once part of Volcan Baru, blown/slid several kilometers to their current location by a violent eruption of the volcano.

Volcan is the Heart of the breadbasket of Panama. Major roads out of Volcan go to the farming communities of Cerro Punta, Plaza de Caisan, La Concepcion, Rio Sereno on the border with Costa Rica and the soon to be completed road to Boquete. Crops grown in and around Volcan include onions, cabbage, carrots, coffee, bananas, potatoes, lettuce, corn, tomatoes, cauliflower, broccoli and cut flowers. Large dairy, horse and cattle farms with many smaller sheep, pigs and chicken farms are along the roads into Volcan. A few kilometres north of Volcan on the road to Cerro Punta is a large trout farm. The farming community is supported by a large Catholic High School, San Benito, dedicated to the improvement of farming methods in Panama.

== Populated places ==
As a corregimiento, Volcán is sub-divided into small populated places and communities such as Nueva California, El Valle, Colonia del Valle, Las Perlas, Brisas del Norte, 6 de Agosto, La Florida, Ojos de Agua, La Fuente, El Llano, Bella Vista and Volcán.

== Climate ==
Volcan is 1,400 meters (4,617 feet) above sea level and at 8.5 degrees North; the weather is Springlike the year around with afternoon highs of mid 20s (upper 70s) and night time lows to the upper 10s (lower 60s). It has two seasons, wet and dry. Starting around December 15, the dry season lasts for about four months.

Climate data for Volcán
Month	Jan	Feb	Mar	Apr	May	Jun	Jul	Aug	Sep	Oct	Nov	Dec	Year
Average rainfall mm (inches)	29.1 (1.15)	19.9 (0.78)	48.5 (1.91)	138.5 (5.45)	381.7 (15.03)	356.8 (14.05)	252.4 (9.94)	391.4 (15.41)	492.0 (19.37)	493.6 (19.43)	252.1 (9.93)	53.0 (2.09)	2,909 (114.54)
Source: IMHPA
