= Paso Ancho =

- Corregimiento
- Location within Panama
- Country: Panama
- Province: Chiriquí
- District: Tierras Altas
- Established: 2013
- Time zone: UTC−5 (EST)
- Climate: Cwb

Paso Ancho is a corregimiento in Tierras Altas District, Chiriquí Province, Panama. It was established by Law 55 of September 13, 2013.

== Climate ==
Paso Ancho has a subtropical highland climate (Cwb) with moderate to little rainfall from December to April and heavy to very heavy rainfall from May to November.

Climate data for Paso Ancho
Month	Jan	Feb	Mar	Apr	May	Jun	Jul	Aug	Sep	Oct	Nov	Dec	Year
Mean daily maximum °C (°F)	22.7 (72.9)	23.4 (74.1)	24.4 (75.9)	24.3 (75.7)	23.8 (74.8)	22.9 (73.2)	23.2 (73.8)	22.9 (73.2)	22.6 (72.7)	22.4 (72.3)	22.0 (71.6)	22.3 (72.1)	23.1 (73.5)
Daily mean °C (°F)	17.5 (63.5)	17.7 (63.9)	18.6 (65.5)	19.0 (66.2)	18.9 (66.0)	18.4 (65.1)	18.6 (65.5)	18.4 (65.1)	18.0 (64.4)	17.9 (64.2)	17.9 (64.2)	17.4 (63.3)	18.2 (64.7)
Mean daily minimum °C (°F)	12.3 (54.1)	12.1 (53.8)	12.8 (55.0)	13.8 (56.8)	14.1 (57.4)	14.0 (57.2)	14.1 (57.4)	14.0 (57.2)	13.5 (56.3)	13.5 (56.3)	13.8 (56.8)	12.5 (54.5)	13.4 (56.1)
Average rainfall mm (inches)	15 (0.6)	29 (1.1)	30 (1.2)	98 (3.9)	276 (10.9)	386 (15.2)	236 (9.3)	268 (10.6)	367 (14.4)	461 (18.1)	269 (10.6)	61 (2.4)	2,496 (98.3)
Source: Climate-Data.org (average temperature)
