= La Concepción, Chiriquí =

Coordinates: 8.5167°N 82.6167°W

La Concepción
- Corregimiento
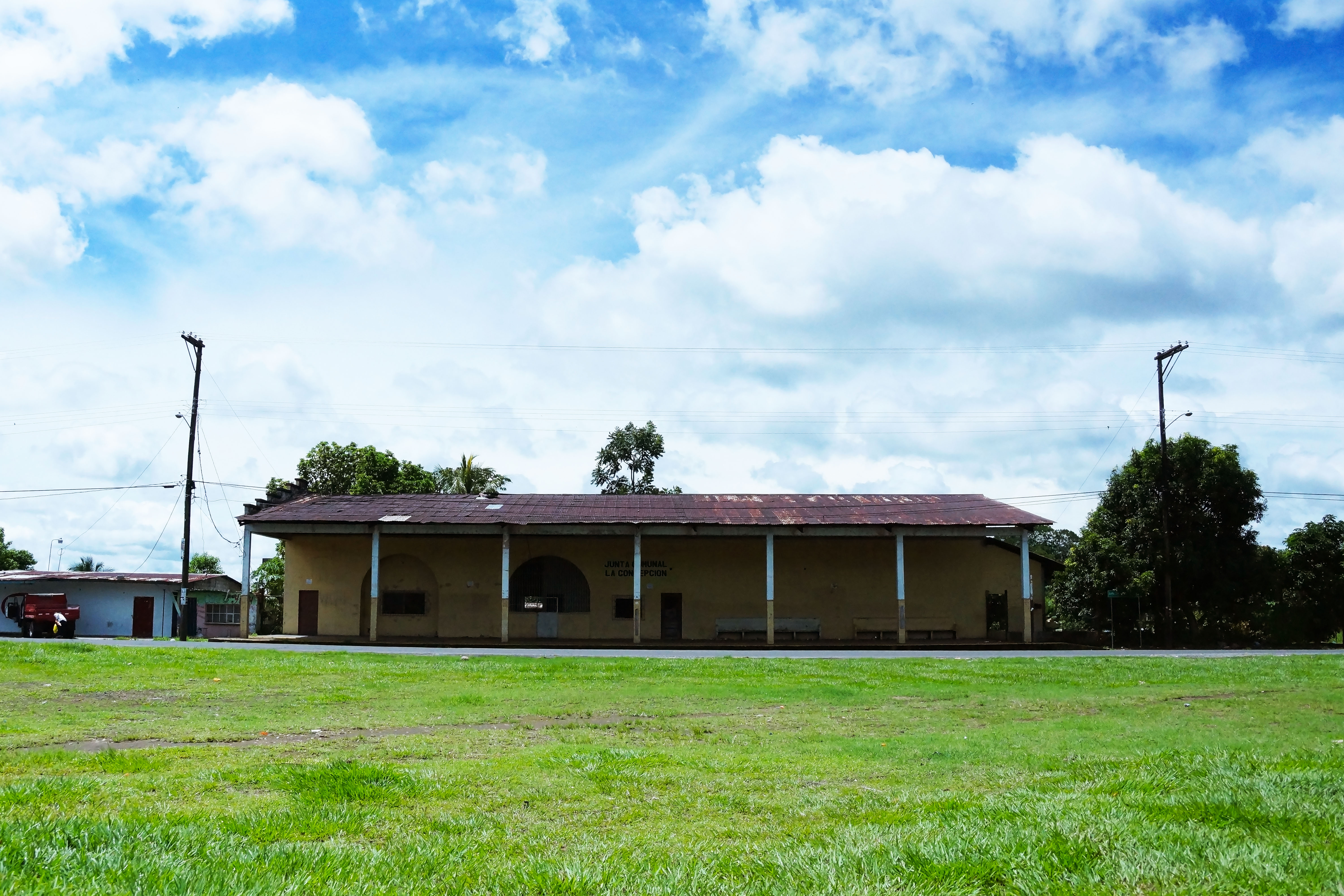

- Location within Panama
- Country: Panama
- Province: Chiriquí
- District: Bugaba

Area
  - Land: 66.9 km^{2} (25.8 sq mi)

Population (2010)
  - Total: 21,356
  - Density: 319.2/km^{2} (827/sq mi)
- Population density calculated based on land area.
- Time zone: UTC−5 (EST)

La Concepción is a corregimiento in Bugaba District, Chiriquí Province, Panama. It is the seat of Bugaba District. It has a land area of 66.9 square kilometres (25.8 sq mi) and had a population of 21,356 as of 2010, giving it a population density of 319.2 inhabitants per square kilometre (827/sq mi). Its population as of 1990 was 17,978; its population as of 2000 was 19,330.
