= Veraguas culture =

Pre-Columbian Panamian culture

The Veraguas culture, also known as the Chiriqui culture, was a pre-Columbian Panamian culture. It is noted for the quality of its goldwork.

== Art ==
The Veraguas culture cast zoomorphic pendants out of gold and tumbaga, using the lost wax method. When using tumbaga, artists would often use acid to remove copper from the surface, allowing for a shinier piece. This process is known as depletion gilding. This goldwork was practiced until the early 16th century CE.

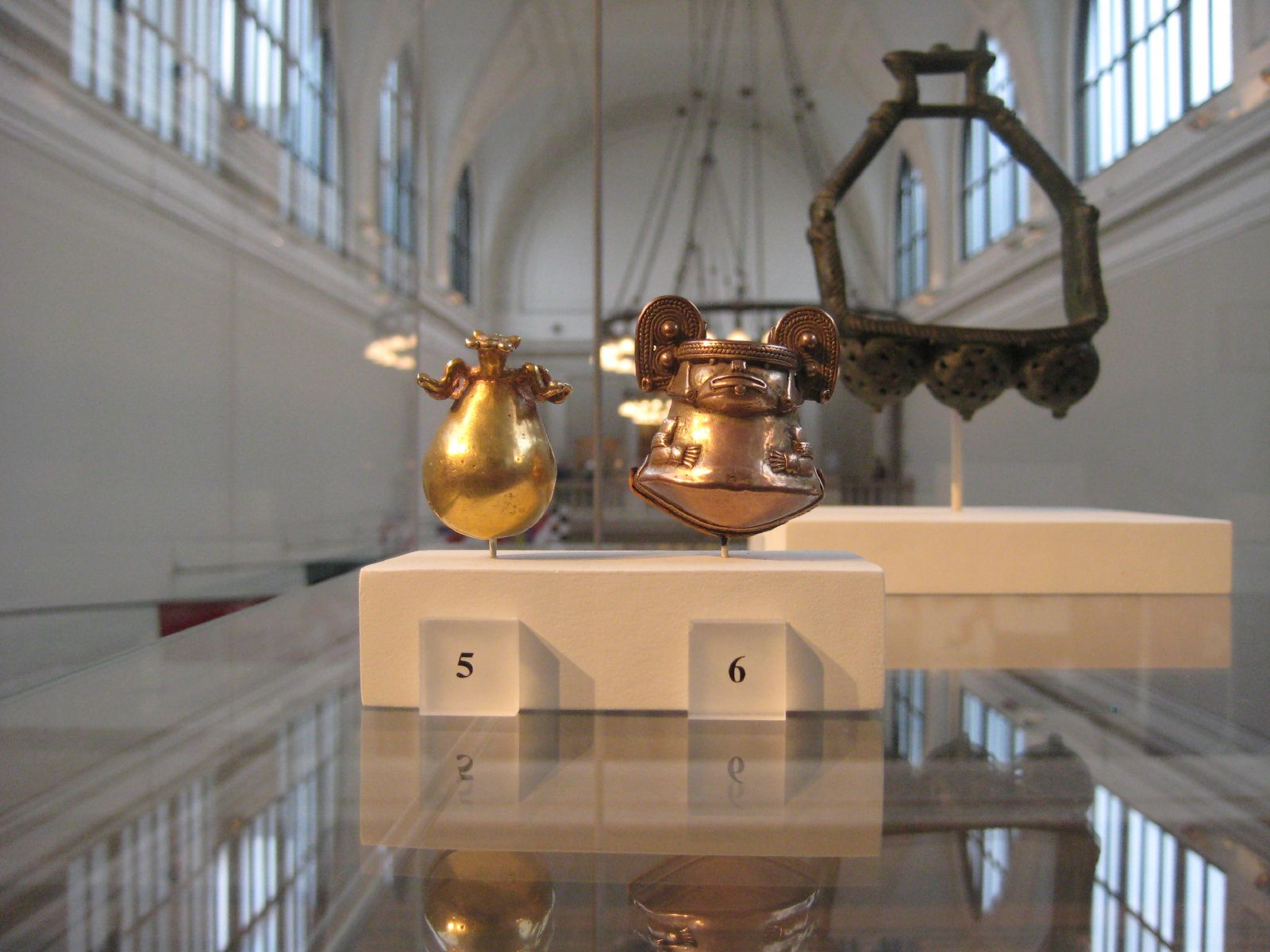
An example of Veraguas goldwork

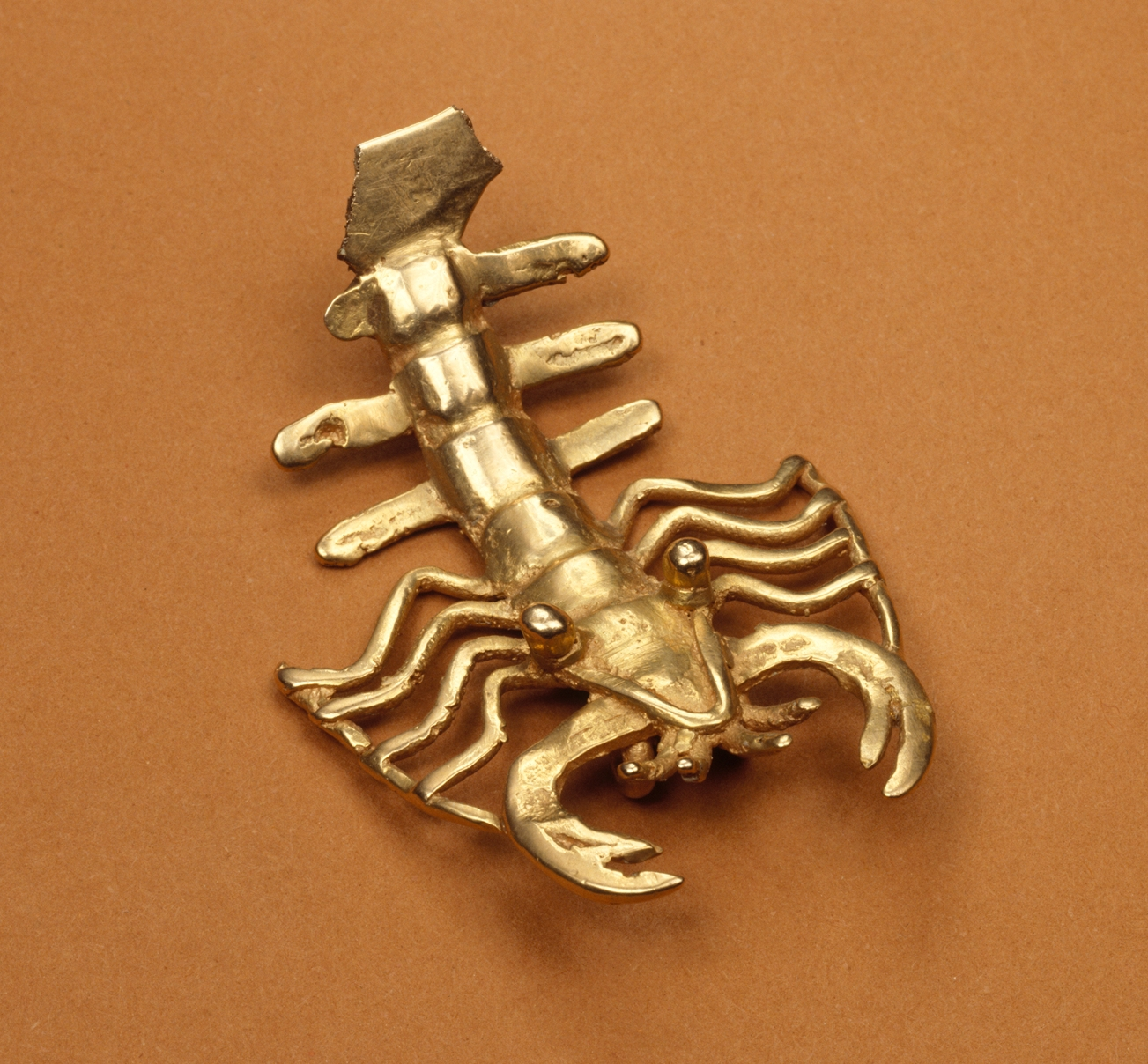
An example of Veraguas zoomorphic goldwork

The Veraguas culture also produced painted tripod bowls and anthropomorphic figures. In addition, sculptures were made out of basalt.

== Sites ==
=== El Cangrejal ===
El Cangrejal is located on the Pacific coast of Panama. Several earthen mounds as well as many potsherds were found at this site.

=== Villalba ===
Villalba is located on a long, thin island of the Pacific coast. Basalt pillars as well as a sculpture of an armadillo have been found.

== Society ==
Little is known about Veraguas society. It is known that the Veraguas elite were buried with the aforementioned gold and tumbaga pendants. Deities were represented in goldwork, and appeared as anthropomorphized animals such as jaguars.
