= Nueva California, Chiriquí =

Nueva California
- Corregimiento
- Location within Panama
- Coordinates: 8.8308°N 82.6720°W
- Country: Panama
- Province: Chiriquí
- District: Tierras Altas
- Established: 2013
- Time zone: UTC−5 (EST)

Nueva California is a corregimiento in Tierras Altas District, Chiriquí Province, Panama. It was established by Law 55 of September 13, 2013.
