= Cerro Punta, Chiriquí =

Cerro Punta
- Corregimiento
- Interactive map of Cerro Punta
- Location within Panama
- Coordinates: 8°51′N 82°34′W
- Country: Panama
- Province: Chiriquí
- District: Tierras Altas

Area
  - Land: 105.1 km^{2} (40.6 sq mi)

Population (2010)
  - Total: 7,754
  - Density: 73.8/km^{2} (191/sq mi)
- Population density calculated based on land area.
- Time zone: UTC−5 (EST)
- Climate: Cfb

Cerro Punta is a city and corregimiento in Tierras Altas District, Chiriquí Province, Panama. Cerro Punta is located in Panama's western highlands at an altitude of 2,000 metres (6,600 ft), just south of the Continental Divide. The climate, like the rest of Panama, is tropical with a short dry season and rainy season that extends about 9 – 10 months of the year. Night time temperatures are often cool due to Cerro Punta's relatively high elevation. During the 1970s much of the land was used for cultivating strawberries; households also maintained small mixed-vegetable gardens. The village can be reached by traveling north from the Pan-American highway.

== Toponymy ==
Cerro Punta is named after a hill with that forms which is the highest point of the village at 2,300 metres (7,500 ft). The original name Cerro de Punta, original name is credited to the Chircana poet Caval Beatriz Miranda, who taught grade school in Cerro Punta. In the 1940s in a meeting to choose the name of the town said: "Cerro Punta your name is written in your mountains."

== Geography ==
Cerro Punta has a fairly rugged terrain, with small plains, where most people live. Outside the main area of the city the houses are widely spaced and the surrounding area is cultivated.

Chiriqui is the most mountainous and highest province in Panama, and Cerro Punta is the highest town in Chiriqui, with elevations ranging from 2,000 metres (6,600 ft) to 2,300 metres (7,500 ft).

=== Climate ===
As such, it shares the tropical rainforest climate of the rest of Panama, with at least 60 millimetres (2.4 in) of rain every month, but is considerably cooler due to the high elevation.

Winds are typically light for most of the year, but are strongest during the dry (and sunniest) season, late December through early April.

The rainy season in Cerro Punta (like the rest of Panama) is from late April until mid-December, peaking in September, October and November. Most rain occurs in the afternoon.

Hailstorms occasionally cause some damage to crops such as peas, beans, herbs, cucumbers, strawberries, potatoes, lettuce, coffee and others.

Climate data for Cerro Punta (Bajo Grande) (2002–2015 normals, extremes 1971–present)
| Month | Jan | Feb | Mar | Apr | May | Jun | Jul | Aug | Sep | Oct | Nov | Dec | Year |
|---|---|---|---|---|---|---|---|---|---|---|---|---|---|
| Record high °C (°F) | 25.0 (77.0) | 25.0 (77.0) | 26.2 (79.2) | 24.5 (76.1) | 24.8 (76.6) | 23.5 (74.3) | 23.0 (73.4) | 23.0 (73.4) | 24.0 (75.2) | 22.5 (72.5) | 23.0 (73.4) | 23.0 (73.4) | 26.2 (79.2) |
| Mean daily maximum °C (°F) | 18.1 (64.6) | 18.8 (65.8) | 19.2 (66.6) | 19.9 (67.8) | 19.7 (67.5) | 19.5 (67.1) | 19.1 (66.4) | 19.2 (66.6) | 19.5 (67.1) | 19.0 (66.2) | 18.4 (65.1) | 18.0 (64.4) | 19.0 (66.3) |
| Daily mean °C (°F) | 13.7 (56.7) | 13.8 (56.8) | 14.1 (57.4) | 14.9 (58.8) | 15.4 (59.7) | 15.6 (60.1) | 15.5 (59.9) | 15.3 (59.5) | 15.3 (59.5) | 15.1 (59.2) | 14.8 (58.6) | 14.2 (57.6) | 14.8 (58.7) |
| Mean daily minimum °C (°F) | 9.4 (48.9) | 8.9 (48.0) | 9.0 (48.2) | 9.9 (49.8) | 11.0 (51.8) | 11.7 (53.1) | 11.9 (53.4) | 11.3 (52.3) | 11.2 (52.2) | 11.2 (52.2) | 11.2 (52.2) | 10.5 (50.9) | 10.6 (51.1) |
| Record low °C (°F) | 2.0 (35.6) | 2.0 (35.6) | 2.0 (35.6) | 3.5 (38.3) | 4.5 (40.1) | 6.4 (43.5) | 5.0 (41.0) | 7.0 (44.6) | 7.0 (44.6) | 6.5 (43.7) | 6.0 (42.8) | 2.0 (35.6) | 2.0 (35.6) |
| Average rainfall mm (inches) | 159.7 (6.29) | 99.7 (3.93) | 69.2 (2.72) | 107.7 (4.24) | 256.7 (10.11) | 264.7 (10.42) | 252.2 (9.93) | 278.6 (10.97) | 292.0 (11.50) | 335.5 (13.21) | 262.9 (10.35) | 244.1 (9.61) | 2,623 (103.28) |
| Mean monthly sunshine hours | 159.7 | 161.7 | 174.1 | 132.6 | 93.9 | 76.6 | 81.1 | 86.8 | 85.3 | 86.3 | 90.2 | 125.6 | 1,353.9 |
Source 1: IMHPA (rainfall, sunshine & extremes)
Source 2: INEC

== Villas ==
Cerro Punta is divided into several villas such as Guadalupe, Bajo Grande, Entre Ríos, Las Nubes, La Garita, Barrio del Bajito, Las Miranda, Barrio 6, El Pueblo, Las Cumbres, Alto Pineda, El Barrio de la Chacha, Nueva Suiza, Alto Bambito; all of which are situated above 2,000 metres (6,600 ft).

== Demographics ==
It has a land area of 105.1 square kilometres (40.6 sq mi) and had a population of 7,754 as of 2010, giving it a population density of 73.8 inhabitants per square kilometre (191/sq mi). Its population as of 1990 was 5,682; its population as of 2000 was 6,860.

60% white and mestizo, 30% indigenous, 10% foreign.

== Economy ==
The local economy is based on agriculture. The land is very fertile as a result of being on the slopes of a dormant volcano and due to the cool and moist conditions associated with the higher elevation. Northern Chiriqui has a different kind of climate from the rest of the country, enabling the successful propagation of some crops that would be impossible in the rest of Panama.

== Tourism ==
Tourism has become another source of income in recent years as the region has a temperate climate, relatively cold within one of the tropical regions in the world. This is interesting for nationals living in the rest of the country and for tourists, because one can enjoy the change of climate and different ecosystems on the same day up to the paramo.

At the highest part of Cerro Punta, the village of Guadalupe at 2197 meters, agriculture dominates but agrotourism and ecotourism are increasing as many come to enjoy the climate, flora and fauna of the Parque Internacional La Amistad (Panama and Costa Rica). Hiking and river rafting are popular activities.

Thoroughbred horse farms are being developed in this area due to lower temperatures and the high elevation (lower oxygen content in the air) makes race horses develop better lung capacity, enabling them to compete successfully in international competitions.
