= Santiago de Veraguas =

Santiago de Veraguas santiago
- City
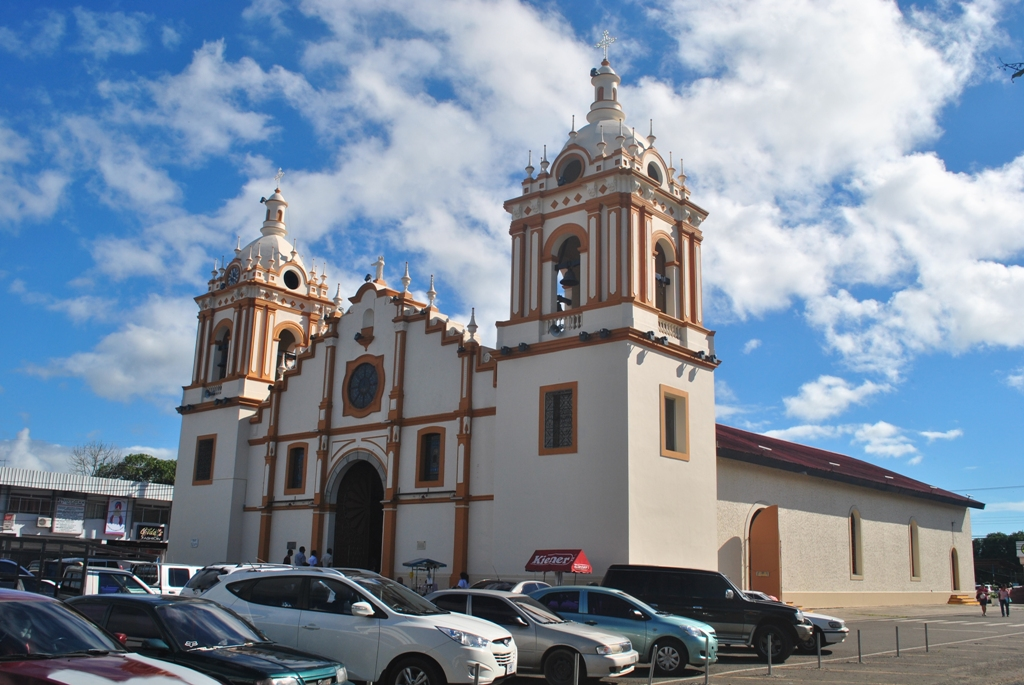
- Cathedral in Santiago de Veraguas
- Nickname: "The Green City"
- Location within Panama
- Coordinates: 8°06′21″N 80°58′16″W
- Country: Panama
- Province: Veraguas
- Founded: July 25th, 1621

Government
  - Mayor: Eric J. Jaén Vega

Area
  - Total: 975 km^{2} (376 sq mi)
- Elevation: 101 m (331 ft)

Population (2010)
  - Total: 88,997
  - Density: 91.3/km^{2} (236/sq mi)
- Time zone: UTC-5 (ETZ)
- Climate: Am
- Website: santiago.municipios.gob.pa

Santiago de Veraguas (Spanish pronunciation: [sanˈtja.ɣo ðe βeˈɾa.ɣwas]) is the capital of the province of Veraguas, in the Republic of Panama, and the district or municipality of the same name. Located in the countryside next to the Pan American Highway, it is bounded on the north by San Francisco District, south by the Montijo District, east by Atalaya District and west by La Mesa District. It has a population of approximately 60,000 inhabitants according to the data of the last census carried out in the Republic of Panama (2014).

== History ==
The unclassified extinct Escoria language was spoken by indigenous peoples around present-day Santiago de Veraguas.

Santiago was founded by the people of Montijo and Santa Fe in the 17th century, who gathered in this place, decided to found a city that served as the starting center dispatches. It was established south of the Martin Grande river commonly called Los Chorros.

Santiago did not exist in 1606 when the Bishop of Panama, Don Antonio Calderon, wrote his account of the peoples who formed the province of Veragua. The Santa Fe (the oldest), San Pedro del Montijo, Atalaya, Nuestra Señora de Remedios and Alanje.

Nor does the poor mapping made by Lorenzo del Salto, dated 1620.

The 2930 manuscript of the National Library in Madrid clearly states that Santiago existed in 1621 (folio 159 r °) which corroborates the hypothesis that its foundation must have taken place or in the late 16th century or the early 17th century. Dr. Alberto Osorio Osorio: Colonial Santiago de Veraguas, Panama 1989, 83 p

The chronicler Juan Diez De La Calle in his "Collection of Documents of the Civil and Ecclesiastical History of America", states that the "city of Santiago de Veragua was founded on October 23, 1621."

The writer gave an account where they made known Indian cities and towns of the kingdom of Tierra Firme. Other evidence about the existence of the old city of Santiago, as it is called in contemporary documents providing information about his transfer in 1637, come from other valuable references and unpublished documents.

So there are two well-defined moments in the pages of the story of Santiago, the city of Santiago de Veragua the old October 23, 1621 and the new 1637. Mario Molina: Veraguas, Land of Columbus and Urraca, 2008

Upon termination definitely the Court of the Audiencia of Panama by the Royal Decree of June 20, 1751, the country was ruled by a military government under the name of General Command of the mainland, which included the province of Veraguas.

On November 28, 1821, independence from Spain was proclaimed in Panama City. On 4 December of the same year in the city of Santiago has proclaimed the Independence of the Veraguas province of Spanish power.

On November 9, 1903, at 3:30 pm, in the city, signed the Act of Accession to the separation of Panama from Colombia.

== Villages ==
Santiago District comprises the following townships: Santiago, La Colorada, La Peña, La Raya de Santa María, Ponuga, San Pedro del Espino, Canto del Llano, Los Algarrobos, San Martín de Porres, Urracá, Edwin Fábrega, Carlos Santana Ávila, La Soledad, Rincón Largo, El Llanito and Rodrigo Luque.

== Economy ==
Santiago's economy is based on trade, banking, agriculture and livestock. To a lesser degree in the pottery industry, in towns like La Peña, and leatherworking at La Colorada.

== Demographics ==
The population of the city of Santiago is 88,997 inhabitants (National Census figures from 2010).

== Infrastructure ==
Santiago is a transportation hub for the Veraguas province, with buses running regularly from the Terminal de Transporte de Santiago to smaller towns in the area. It is well connected to the rest of the country and has historically served as a stopover point for people traveling from Panama City to other parts of the country such as Chitré and David. Its position in the middle of the country has been used to its advantages, promoting the construction of important roads and bridges to connect the rest of the Veraguas province. The Pan-American Highway passes through the city and public transportation is available for its residents. Like many other cities in Panama, Santiago is a city without high-rises, but instead has retained a more colonial architecture and feel. Modern buildings are found sprawled throughout the city, especially used for shopping centers, banks, and government offices. Its colonial roots are great in historical value and can be seen through The Juan Demóstenes Arosemena Normal School, a declared a national historical monument, The Regional Museum of Veraguas and the St. James the Apostle Cathedral. The city is served by two main hospitals - Hospital Dr. Luis "Chicho" Fábrega in the outskirts of the city and the Dr. Horacio Díaz Gómez Polyclinic. Other smaller health care facilities, both public and private, can be found throughout the city. Different infrastructure projects, such as the improvement of the quality of roads and public spaces, including the burial of electric cables in Avenida Central, have been worked on in recent years.

== Tourism ==
Santiago, the capital of Veraguas, is approximately three and a half hours from Panama City along the Pan-American Highway. It is a popular shopping area to buy clothes, medicine or food before visiting the most famous destinations in the province. Santiago has approximately 2000 rooms in hotels, pensions, and temporary apartments located on the Pan-American Highway.

== Mayors (1994-Present) ==
- Mario Luis Delgado (1994–1999)
- Plinio Donoso (1999–2004)
- Ruben Patiño (2004–2009)
- Gonzalo "Chalo" Adames (2009–2014)
- Edward Mosley Ibarra (2014- 2019)
- Samid Sandoval (2019–2024)
- Eric Jaén Vega (2024–2029)

== Geography ==
- Elevation: 101 meters.
- Latitude 8 ° 6 '20.57 "N
- Longitude 80 ° 58 '16.06 "W

=== Climate ===
Climate data for Santiago de Veraguas (1991–2020 normals, extremes 1955–present)
Month	Jan	Feb	Mar	Apr	May	Jun	Jul	Aug	Sep	Oct	Nov	Dec	Year
Record high °C (°F)	37.0 (98.6)	38.0 (100.4)	39.4 (102.9)	39.4 (102.9)	38.4 (101.1)	37.6 (99.7)	36.4 (97.5)	35.8 (96.4)	36.4 (97.5)	35.2 (95.4)	35.6 (96.1)	36.0 (96.8)	39.4 (102.9)
Mean daily maximum °C (°F)	33.0 (91.4)	34.4 (93.9)	35.3 (95.5)	35.1 (95.2)	33.1 (91.6)	32.0 (89.6)	31.9 (89.4)	32.0 (89.6)	31.8 (89.2)	30.9 (87.6)	31.0 (87.8)	32.0 (89.6)	32.7 (90.9)
Daily mean °C (°F)	26.8 (80.2)	27.7 (81.9)	28.3 (82.9)	28.7 (83.7)	28.0 (82.4)	27.4 (81.3)	27.2 (81.0)	27.3 (81.1)	27.0 (80.6)	26.7 (80.1)	26.7 (80.1)	26.8 (80.2)	27.4 (81.3)
Mean daily minimum °C (°F)	20.5 (68.9)	20.9 (69.6)	21.3 (70.3)	22.3 (72.1)	23.0 (73.4)	22.9 (73.2)	22.5 (72.5)	22.6 (72.7)	22.2 (72.0)	22.4 (72.3)	22.3 (72.1)	21.5 (70.7)	22.0 (71.6)
Record low °C (°F)	15.6 (60.1)	15.6 (60.1)	16.6 (61.9)	16.8 (62.2)	18.0 (64.4)	19.4 (66.9)	18.0 (64.4)	18.8 (65.8)	18.2 (64.8)	17.8 (64.0)	18.8 (65.8)	15.2 (59.4)	15.2 (59.4)
Average rainfall mm (inches)	22.5 (0.89)	16.7 (0.66)	20.9 (0.82)	96.7 (3.81)	313.7 (12.35)	300.8 (11.84)	243.0 (9.57)	317.3 (12.49)	342.4 (13.48)	395.5 (15.57)	259.3 (10.21)	82.7 (3.26)	2,411.5 (94.95)
Average rainy days (≥ 0.1 mm)	2.3	1.1	1.8	6.2	17	18	15	18	20	21	17	6.6	144
Mean monthly sunshine hours	235.1	243.3	247.6	202.6	160.0	124.6	133.2	139.1	128.0	129.8	139.3	182.2	2,064.8
Mean daily daylight hours	11.7	11.9	12.1	12.3	12.5	12.6	12.5	12.4	12.2	11.9	11.8	11.7	12.1
Percentage possible sunshine	65	72	66	55	41	33	34	36	35	35	40	50	47
Source 1: World Meteorological Organization
Source 2: Climates to Travel IMHPA Weather Spark

== Gallery ==
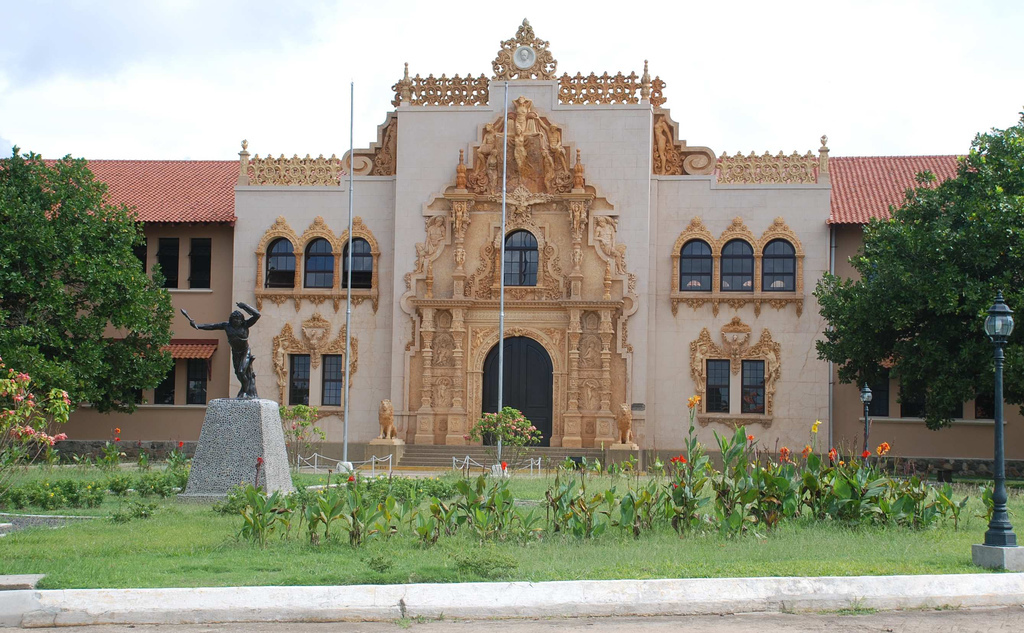
Normal School

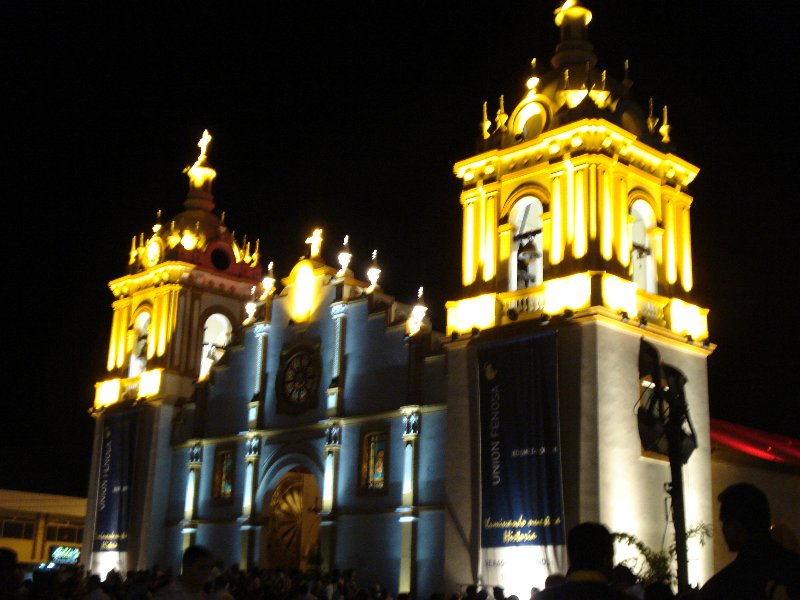
Cathedral Santiago Apostol

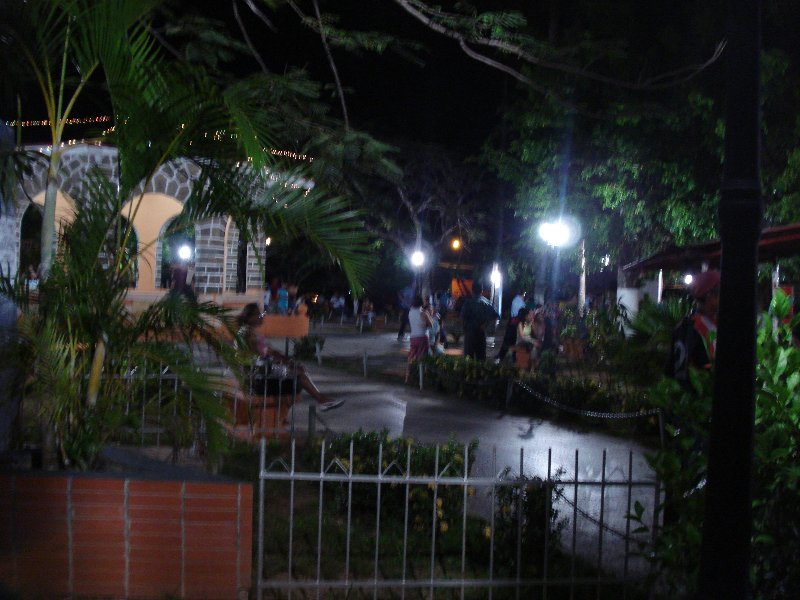
Parque Santiago
