= 2015 Copa Panamá =

Copa Cable Onda Satelital

Tournament details
- Country: Panama
- Venue(s): Estadio Maracaná, Panama City
- Dates: 5 August – 9 December 2015
- Teams: 32

Final positions
- Champions: San Francisco
- Runners-up: Chepo

Tournament statistics
- Matches played: 37
- Goals scored: 88 (2.38 per match)
- Top goal scorer(s): (Panama) Sergio Moreno (5 goals)
- Goals scored in penalty shoot-outs not included.

The 2015 Copa Panamá (officially known as Copa Cable Onda Satelital because of its sponsorship with Cable Onda) was the 1st season of the annual Panamanian knockout football cup competition. Thirty-two clubs from the first to the third tier of the Panamanian football league system participated in this year's competition which began on 5 August 2015 with the first of five rounds and ended on 9 December 2015 with the final at the Estadio Maracaná in Panama City.

San Francisco won the final against Chepo 5-4 on penalties, as the match finished 0–0 after extra time, to win their first title.

== Format ==
The Copa Panamá is open to eligible clubs down to the third tier of the Panamanian football league system – all 10 and 14 teams from the Liga Panameña de Fútbol and Liga Nacional de Ascenso respectively participate as well as 8 of the highest ranking amateur teams in the Copa Rommel Fernández tournament based on the results and points they obtained during the FIFA calendar year prior to the start of the cup.

The competition is a 5-round knockout tournament with pairings for each round made in advance; the draw for the whole competition is made before a ball is kicked. Each tie is played as a single leg, with the exception of the two-legged quarter-finals and semi-finals. In the single leg ties clubs from lower-ranking leagues are given field preference when facing opponents from a higher-ranked league. If a match is drawn, extra time is played and in the event of a draw after 120 minutes, a penalty shoot-out is contested.

== Participating teams ==
Locations of the 2015 Copa Panamá teams

Club	Home city	Stadium	Tier
Alianza	Panama City	Cancha de Entrenamiento Luis Tapia	1
Árabe Unido	Colón	Estadio Armando Dely Valdés	1
Atlético Chiriquí	David	Estadio San Cristóbal	1
Atlético Veragüense	Santiago	Estadio Áristocles Castillo	2
Atlético Nacional	Panama City	Estadio Maracaná	1
Bambú	Colón	Estadio Armando Dely Valdés	3
Centenario	Penonomé	Estadio Virgilio Tejeira	2
Chepo	Chepo	Estadio Óscar Sumán Carrillo (in Panama City)	1
Chiriquí Occidente	Puerto Armuelles	Estadio Glorias Deportivas Baruenses	2
Chorrillo	Panama City	Estadio Maracaná	1
Club Atlético Independiente	La Chorrera	Estadio Agustín Sánchez	2
Colón C-3	Colón	Estadio Armando Dely Valdés	2
Costa del Este	Panama City	Cancha de Entrenamiento Luis Tapia	2
Cosmos	Antón	Estadio Miraflores	3
Deportivo Aroon	La Mesa	Estadio Áristocles Castillo	3
Don Bosco	Monagrillo	Estadio Los Milagros	3
New York	Colón	Estadio Armando Dely Valdés	2
Municipal San Miguelito (Note: While on 13 May 2015 the club changed its name from Millenium Universidad de Panamá F.C to Asociación Deportiva Municipal de San Miguelito, the change was not officiated by the Panamanian Football Federation until 29 February 2016. Therefore, in official reports Municipal San Miguelito's name appear as Millenium.)	San Miguelito	Cancha de Entrenamiento Luis Tapia	2
Panamá Oeste	Arraiján	Estadio Agustín Sánchez	2
Plaza Amador	Panama City	Estadio Maracaná	1
Río Abajo	Panama City	Cancha de Entrenamiento Luis Tapia	2
River Plate	David	Estadio San Cristóbal	3
San Francisco	La Chorrera	Estadio Agustín Sánchez	1
Sporting Empalme	El Empalme	Estadio Calvin Byron	3
Sporting San Miguelito	San Miguelito	Cancha de Entrenamiento Luis Tapia	1
Santa Gema	La Chorrera	Estadio Agustín Sánchez	2
Santo Domingo	Santo Domingo	Estadio Olmedo Solé	3
Solano	Bugaba	Estadio Municipal de Bugaba	3
SUNTRACS	San Miguelito	Estadio Maracaná	2
Tauro	Panama City	Estadio Rommel Fernández	1
Tierra Firme	Panama City	Cancha de Entrenamiento Luis Tapia	2
Vista Alegre	Arraiján	Estadio Agustín Sánchez	2

== Results ==
=== Bracket ===
Round of 32
Atlético Veragüense	1 (4)
Atlético Nacional	1 (2)
River Plate	0
Río Abajo	4
Sporting Empalme	0
San Francisco	7
Deportivo Aroon	2
Árabe Unido	3
Santo Domingo	1 (4)
Plaza Amador	1 (5)
SUNTRACS	0
Vista Alegre	1
Cosmos	1 (1)
Tauro	1 (4)
Centenario	1
New York	0
Solano	1 (2)
Sporting San Miguelito	1 (4)
Chiriquí Occidente	0
Chorrillo	2
Don Bosco	1
Alianza	7
Panamá Oeste	1
Santa Gema	0
Costa del Este	1
Club Atlético Independiente	2
Municipal San Miguelito	4
Tierra Firme	1
Colón C-3	0 (5)
Atlético Chiriquí	0 (6)
Bambú	0
Chepo	5

Round of 16
Atlético Veragüense	0
Río Abajo	2
San Francisco	2
Árabe Unido	0
Plaza Amador	1
Vista Alegre	0
Tauro	1 (8)
Centenario	1 (8)
Sporting San Miguelito	0
Chorrillo	2
Alianza	0 (2)
Panamá Oeste	0 (3)
Club Atlético Independiente	1 (4)
Municipal San Miguelito	1 (5)
Atlético Chiriquí	0 (2)
Chepo	0 (4)

Quarter-finals
Río Abajo	0	1
San Francisco	1	3
Plaza Amador	2	3
Tauro	1	0
Chorrillo	1	3
Panamá Oeste	1	0
Municipal San Miguelito	1	1
Chepo	1	2

Semi-finals
San Francisco	1	1
Plaza Amador	1	0
Chorrillo	0	1
Chepo	1	1

Final
San Francisco	0 (5)
Chepo	0 (4)

=== Round of 32 ===
5 August 2015	Don Bosco (3)	1-7	(1) Alianza	Chitré
16:00	Josué Brown 89'	Report	12' 44' 70' José Muñoz; 54' 57' Ricauter Barsallo; 17' Alberto Quiñones; 85' Kenneth Chase	Stadium: Estadio Los Milagros

5 August 2015	Atlético Veragüense (2)	1-1 (4–2 p)	(1) Atlético Nacional	Santiago
19:00	Cristian Bernal 36'	Report	90+4' Luis Jiménez	Stadium: Estadio Áristocles Castillo

5 August 2015	Solano (3)	1-1 (2–4 p)	(1) Sporting San Miguelito	Bugaba
19:00	Martín Jiménez 46' (o.g.)	Report	14' Israel Fearon	Stadium: Estadio Municipal de Bugaba

5 August 2015	Santo Domingo (3)	1-1 (4–5 p)	(1) Plaza Amador	Las Tablas
21:00	Jheyskoll Atencio 47'	Report	85' (pen.) Ricardo Buitrago	Stadium: Estadio Olmedo Solé

5 August 2015	Cosmos (3)	1-1 (1–4 p)	(1) Tauro	Penonomé
21:00	Goal	Report	Jesús Araya	Stadium: Estadio Miraflores

5 August 2015	River Plate (3)	0-4	(2) Río Abajo	David
21:00		Report	Fernando Clavero; Samir Ortiz; Gabriel Ríos	Stadium: Estadio San Cristóbal

12 August 2015	Sporting Empalme (3)	0-7	(1) San Francisco	El Empalme
19:00		Report	29' 69' 81' Boris Alfaro; 20' Ervin Zorrilla; 30' Daniel Morán; 47' Andrés Andrade; 77' Salvador Herrera	Stadium: Estadio Calvin Byron

12 August 2015	Colón C-3 (2)	0-0 (5-6 p)	(1) Atlético Chiriquí	Colón
19:00		Report		Stadium: Estadio Armando Dely Valdés

12 August 2015	Deportivo Aroon (3)	2-3	(1) Árabe Unido	Santiago
19:00	Jairo Castillo 11'; Erick Quiroz 66'	Report	7' 90+1' Enrico Small; 85' Renán Addles	Stadium: Estadio Áristocles Castillo

12 August 2015	Costa del Este (2)	1-2	(2) Club Atlético Independiente	Panama City
21:00	Luis Zúñiga 58'	Report	31' 33' Juan Velásquez	Stadium: Cancha de Entrenamiento Luis Tapia

25 August 2015	SUNTRACS (2)	0-1	(2) Vista Alegre	Panama City
19:00		Report	33' Juan Luis Murillo	Stadium: Estadio Maracaná

25 August 2015	Centenario (2)	1-0	(2) New York	Penonomé
19:00	Juan Largacha 73'	Report		Stadium: Estadio Miraflores

25 August 2015	Panamá Oeste (2)	1-0	(2) Santa Gema	La Chorrera
21:00	Gabriel Martínez 25'	Report		Stadium: Estadio Agustín Sánchez

25 August 2015	Municipal San Miguelito (2)	4-1	(2) Tierra Firme	Panama City
21:00	Esteban Jaén 21'; Alcibíades Londoño 28'; Luis Hurtado 50'; Alberto Fonseca 60'	Report	53' José Rivas	Stadium: Cancha de Entrenamiento Luis Tapia

26 August 2015	Bambú (3)	0-5	(1) Chepo	Colón
19:00		Report	30' 66' Ángel Sánchez; 31' Paul Roderick; 82' Nilson Espinoza; 88' Delano Welch	Stadium: Estadio Armando Dely Valdés

(Note: The match was originally scheduled to be played on August 25 (19:00) but due to heavy rain it had to be postponed.)1 September 2015	Chiriquí Occidente (2)	0-2	(1) Chorrillo	Puerto Armuelles
		Report	4' Andrés Peñalba; 88' Sergio Moreno	Stadium: Estadio Glorias Deportivas Baruenses

=== Round of 16 ===
6 October 2015	Centenario (2)	1-1 (Note: Due to the lack of stadium lights, after 16 penalty shots the match was suspended as the visibility in the field was poor given that the match was scheduled late in the afternoon. The delegates from the Comité de Competencia (Competition Committee in english) ordered that there was not to be a re-match and the winner had to be decided over a coin-toss which Tauro won to secure their place in the quarter-finals.) (8-8 p)	(1) Tauro	Penonomé
19:00	Jahamet Ortiz 55'	Report	48' Israel Sanjur	Stadium: Estadio Miraflores; Referee: Edwin Jordan

6 October 2015	Chorrillo (1)	2-0	(1) Sporting San Miguelito	Panama City
19:00	Sergio Moreno 31'; Caio Milan 67'	Report		Stadium: Estadio Maracaná; Referee: Albis González

6 October 2015	San Francisco (1)	2-0	(1) Árabe Unido	La Chorrera
19:00	Daniel Morán 6'; Richard Rodríguez 27'	Report		Stadium: Estadio Agustín Sánchez

7 October 2015	Atlético Chiriquí (1)	0-0 (2-3 p)	(1) Chepo	David
19:00		Report		Stadium: Estadio San Cristóbal

7 October 2015	Panamá Oeste (2)	0-0 (3-2 p)	(1) Alianza	Panama City
19:00		Report		Stadium: Cancha de Entrenamiento Luis Tapia; Referee: Leonel García

7 October 2015	Vista Alegre (2)	0-1	(1) Plaza Amador	La Chorrera
19:00		Report	37' José Luis Garcés	Stadium: Estadio Agustín Sánchez; Referee: Wenceslao Aguilar

7 October 2015	Atlético Veragüense (2)	0-2	(2) Río Abajo	Santiago
19:00		Report		Stadium: Estadio Áristocles Castillo

7 October 2015	Municipal San Miguelito (2)	0-0 (5–4 p)	(2) Club Atlético Independiente	Panama City
19:00		Report		Stadium: Estadio Maracaná; Referee: César Colpas

=== Quarter-finals ===
==== First leg ====
20 October 2015	Tauro (1)	1-2	(1) Plaza Amador	Panama City
21:00	Jorman Aguilar 78'	Report	36' (pen.) Josiel Núñez; 87' Carlos Gutiérrez	Stadium: Estadio Rommel Fernández

21 October 2015	Panamá Oeste (2)	1-1	(1) Chorrillo	Panama City
19:00	José Pérez 44'	Report	3' (pen.) Ricardo Ávila	Stadium: Cancha de Entrenamiento Luis Tapia

21 October 2015	Municipal San Miguelito (2)	1-1	(1) Chepo	Panama City
21:00	Rául Moreno 78'	Report	90+3' Juan de Gracia	Stadium: Estadio Maracaná; Referee: Alvis González

28 October 2015	Río Abajo (2)	0-1	(1) San Francisco	Panama City
19:00		Report	Richard Rodríguez 34'	Stadium: Cancha de Entrenamiento Luis Tapia

==== Second leg ====
27 October 2015	Plaza Amador (1)	3-0 (5-1 agg.)	(1) Tauro	Panama City
21:00	Erwin del Busto 6' 38'; José Luis Garcés 88'	Report		Stadium: Estadio Maracaná; Referee: Víctor Ríos

28 October 2015	Chepo (1)	2-1 (3-2 agg.)	(2) Municipal San Miguelito	Panama City
19:00	Delano Welch 52'; Marlon Ávila 85'	Report	66' John Ramírez	Stadium: Estadio OÓscar Sumán Carrillo

28 October 2015	Chorrillo (1)	3-0 (4-1 agg.)	(2) Panamá Oeste	Panama City
21:00	Sergio Moreno; José Luis Rodríguez	Report		Stadium: Estadio Maracaná

4 November 2015	San Francisco (1)	3-1 (4-1 agg.)	(2) Río Abajo	La Chorrera
21:00	19' 65' Johnny Ruiz; 22' Ervin Zorrilla	Report	Martín Longinos 78'	Stadium: Estadio Agustín Sánchez; Referee: Oliver Vergara

=== Semi-finals ===
==== First leg ====
18 November 2015	Chorrillo (1)	0-1	(1) Chepo	Panama City
19:00		Report	Nilson Espinosa	Stadium: Estadio Maracaná

18 November 2015	Plaza Amador (1)	1-1	(1) San Francisco	Panama City
21:30	Ariel Bonilla 59'	Report	35' Johnny Ruiz	Stadium: Estadio Maracaná

==== Second leg ====
24 November 2015	San Francisco (1)	1-0 (2-1 agg.)	(1) Plaza Amador	La Chorrera
21:30	Luis Olivardía 77'	Report		Stadium: Estadio Agustín Sánchez; Referee: José Luis Rodríguez

25 November 2015	Chepo (1)	1-1 (2-1 agg.)	(1) Chorrillo	Panama City
19:00	Bernardo Palma 36'	Report	11' Sergio Moreno	Stadium: Estadio Óscar Sumán Carrillo; Referee: Víctor Ríos

=== Final ===
9 December 2015	San Francisco (1)	0-0 (5–4 p)	(1) Chepo	Panama City
20:00		Report		Stadium: Estadio Maracaná; Referee: Oliver Veragara
	Penalties
	Richard Rodríguez (penalty scored); Eduardo Jiménez (penalty scored); Luis Olivardía (penalty scored); Johnny Ruiz (penalty scored); Eybir Bonaga (penalty scored)		Ángel Sánchez (penalty scored); Óscar Linton (penalty scored); Delano Welch (penalty scored); Carlos Valdez (penalty scored); Isaías Olmedo (penalty missed)

== Top goalscorers ==
Rank	Player	Club	Goals
1	(Panama) Sergio Moreno	Chorrillo	5
2	(Panama) José Muñoz	Alianza	3
2	(Panama) Johnny Ruiz	San Francisco	3
2	(Panama) Boris Alfaro	San Francisco	3
2	(Argentina) Fernando Clavero	Río Abajo	3
