= 2016–17 Liga Panameña de Fútbol season =

Liga Panameña de Fútbol
- Season: 2016–17
- Champions: Apertura: Árabe Unido (15th Title); Clausura: Tauro (13th Title)
- Relegated: Atlético Nacional
- Champions League: Tauro
- CONCACAF League: Árabe Unido; Plaza Amador; Chorrillo

The 2016–17 Liga Panameña de Fútbol season (also known as the Liga Cable Onda) was the 27th season of top-flight football in Panama. The season began on 2016 and was scheduled to end in May 2017. Ten teams competed throughout the entire season.

== Teams ==
Atlético Chiriquí finished in 10th place in the overall table last season and were relegated to the Liga Nacional de Ascenso. Taking their place for this season are the overall champions of last season's Liga Nacional de Ascenso Santa Gema.

Chepo suffered financial trouble and sold their spot to Atletico Veraguense.

Club	Home city	Stadium
Alianza	Panama City	Cancha de Entrenamiento Luis Tapia
Árabe Unido	Colón	Cancha de Entrenamiento Luis Tapia (in Panama City)
Atlético Nacional	Panama City	Estadio Agustín "Muquita" Sánchez
Atletico Veraguense	Santiago de Veraguas	Cancha de Entrenamiento Luis Tapia (in Panama City)
Chorrillo	Panama City	Estadio Javier Cruz
Plaza Amador	Panama City	Estadio Javier Cruz
San Francisco	La Chorrera	Estadio Agustín Sánchez
Santa Gema	Arraiján	Cancha del Mystic
Sporting San Miguelito	San Miguelito	Cancha de Entrenamiento Luis Tapia
Tauro	Panama City	Cancha de Entrenamiento Luis Tapia

== 2016 Apertura ==
=== Personnel and sponsoring (2016 Apertura) ===
Team	Chairman	Head coach	Kitmaker	Shirt sponsor
Alianza	TBD	(Panama) José Anthony Torres	Lotto	Balboa
Árabe Unido	TBD	(Colombia) Juan Sergio Guzmán	Puma	Pizza Hut
Atletico Nacional		(Panama) José Chiari	Adidas	Nikos
Atletico Veraguense	TBD	(Panama) Marcos Pimentel	GEMS	EGS, NCO
Chorrillo		(Panama) Jair Medina	Lotto	McDonald's, Cremoso
Plaza Amador	TBD	(Colombia) Jair Palacios	Diadora	Páguela Facil, Frosquito, Mercana
Santa Gema		(Panama) Leopoldo Lee	Mitre	ShowPro
San Francisco	Julio Quijano	(Panama) Mike Stump	Lotto	KFC, Canon, Banco General
Sporting San Miguelito	TBD	(Colombia) Juan Pablo Lopera	Joma	Kenwood, Hyundai
Tauro	TBD	(Panama) Rolando Palma	Patrick	Publica Amarias, Dominos, Estrella Azul, Argos, Capital Bank

=== During the season ===
Team	Outgoing manager	Manner of departure	Date of vacancy	Replaced by	Date of appointment	Position in table
Atletico Veraguense	(Panama) Marcos Pimentel	Mutual agreement	August 2016	(Colombia) Andrés Felipe Domínguez	August 2016	th (Apertura 2016)
Chorrillo	(Panama) Jair Medina	Sacked	September 2016	(Colombia) Óscar Upegui	September 2016	th (Apertura 2016)
Sporting San Miguelito	(Colombia) Juan Pablo Lopera	Sacked	October 2016	(Panama) José Alfredo Poyatos	October 2016	th (Apertura 2016)

=== Standings ===
Pos	Team	Pld	W	D	L	GF	GA	GD	Pts	Qualification
1	Tauro	18	11	5	2	30	9	+21	38	Qualified to the Final Round
2	Plaza Amador	18	9	9	0	21	8	+13	36	Qualified to the Final Round
3	Chorrillo	18	10	3	5	20	14	+6	33	Qualified to the Final Round
4	Árabe Unido	18	8	5	5	26	17	+9	29	Qualified to the Final Round
5	Santa Gema	18	6	5	7	15	13	+2	23	
6	San Francisco	18	7	4	7	15	17	−2	25	
7	Alianza	18	7	1	10	18	25	−7	22	
8	Sporting San Miguelito	18	3	5	10	12	23	−11	14	
9	Atletico Veraguense	18	3	5	10	7	23	−16	14	
10	Atlético Nacional	18	2	4	12	11	26	−15	10	

Updated to match(es) played on 13 November 2016. Source: Soccerway
Rules for classification: 1) points; 2) goal difference; 3) number of goals scored.

=== Results ===
Home \ Away	ALI	ATL	DÁU	ATV	CHO	PA	SAN	SF	SSM	TAU
Alianza		2–1	0–2	2–0	0–4	1–1	0–1	1–2	2–1	0–2
Atlético Nacional	1–2		1–1	1–0	1–2	1–3	1–1	0–1	0–0	0–2
Árabe Unido	3–1	0–1		4–1	1–1	0–0	2–3	0–2	2–0	2–1
Atletico Veraguense	1–0	0–0	0–1		1–1	0–1	0–0	1–1	0–0	0–2
Chorrillo	0–3	1–0	1–0	1–0		0–2	0–0	2–0	0–1	1–0
Plaza Amador	2–0	2–1	2–2	1–0	2–0		1–0	0–0	2–1	1–1
Santa Gema	0–1	2–1	1–0	0–1	1–2	0–0		0–0	4–2	0–0
San Francisco	0–1	1–0	1–3	3–0	1–2	1–1	0–1		1–0	0–3
Sporting San Miguelito	1–0	2–1	1–3	1–2	0–2	0–0	0–0	0–1		2–2
Tauro	3–2	4–0	0–0	4–0	1–0	0–0	2–1	2–0	1–0	

Updated to match(es) played on 13 November 2016. Source:
Legend: Blue = home team win; Yellow = draw; Red = away team win.

=== Second stage ===
Semifinals
1	Tauro	0	0	3
4	Árabe Unido	3	2	5
2	Plaza Amador	0	1	1
3	Chorrillo	0	0	0

Final
4	Árabe Unido	2
2	Plaza Amador	0

==== Semifinals ====
First legs

19 November 2016

Árabe Unido	3 – 0	Tauro
F. Caesar 33'; E. Small 44'; J. González 90+1'

Estadio Armando Dely Valdés
Referee: Ameth Sánchez

19 November 2016

Chorrillo	0 – 0	Plaza Amador

Estadio Maracaná de Panamá
Referee: John Pitty

Second legs

26 November 2016

Tauro	3 – 2	Árabe Unido
J. Muñoz 1'; E. Aguilar 5', 35' (pen.)		A. Macea 47'; E. Small 54'

Estadio Rommel Fernández
Referee: Victor Rios

Arabe Unido won 5–3 on aggregate.

26 November 2016

Plaza Amador	1 – 0	Chorrillo
F. Piedrahita 77'

Estadio Maracaná de Panamá
Referee: Jafeth Perea

Plaza Amador won 1–0 on aggregate.

==== Finals ====
Grand Final

December 3, 2016

Plaza Amador	0 – 2	Árabe Unido
		A. Macea 45'; E. Small 69'

Estadio Rommel Fernández
Referee: Ameth Sánchez

Apertura 2016 champions

15th title

== 2017 Clausura ==
=== Personnel and sponsoring (2017 Clausura) ===
Team	Chairman	Head coach	Kitmaker	Shirt sponsor
Alianza	(Mexico) Rubén Cárdenas	(Mexico) Ángel Monares	Lotto	Balboa
Árabe Unido	(Colombia) Pedro Gordon	(Colombia) Juan Sergio Guzmán	Puma	Pizza Hut
Atletico Nacional	(Colombia) Eduardo Serracin	(Colombia) Daniel Valencia	Lotto	Subway
Atletico Veraguense	(Colombia) Rafael Sanjur	(Panama) Jorge Santos	GEMS	EGS, NCO
Chorrillo	(Colombia) Manuel E. Arias	(Panama) Mike Stump	Lotto	McDonald's, Cremoso
Plaza Amador	(Panama) Gian Castillero	(Colombia) Jair Palacios	Diadora	Páguela Facil, Frosquito, Mercana
Santa Gema		(Costa Rica) Leopoldo Lee	Mitre	ShowPro
San Francisco	(Colombia) Jose Luis Dejuane	(Colombia) Andrés Dominguez	Lotto	KFC, Canon, Banco General
Sporting San Miguelito	(Colombia) Lucas Aleman	(Panama) Mario Anthony Torres	Joma	Kenwood, Hyundai
Tauro	(Colombia) Robert Zauner	(Colombia) Rolando Palma	Patrick	Publicar Páginas Amarillas

=== Standings ===
Pos	Team	Pld	W	D	L	GF	GA	GD	Pts	Qualification
1	Plaza Amador	18	12	4	2	26	10	+16	40	Qualified to the Final Round
2	Tauro	18	8	7	3	25	16	+9	31	Qualified to the Final Round
3	Atletico Veraguense	18	7	7	4	23	14	+9	28	Qualified to the Final Round
4	Árabe Unido	18	8	4	6	25	20	+5	28	Qualified to the Final Round
5	San Francisco	18	7	5	6	22	24	−2	26	
6	Chorrillo	18	5	7	6	18	21	−3	22	
7	Sporting San Miguelito	18	4	7	7	20	22	−2	19	
8	Alianza	18	5	4	9	14	19	−5	19	
9	Santa Gema	18	4	6	8	14	18	−4	18	
10	Atlético Nacional	18	3	3	12	13	36	−23	12	

Updated to match(es) played on 6 May 2017. Source: Soccerway
Rules for classification: 1) points; 2) goal difference; 3) number of goals scored.

=== Results ===
Home \ Away	ALI	ATL	DÁU	ATV	CHO	PA	SAN	SF	SSM	TAU
Alianza		0–1	1–2	0–2	1–0	0–0	1–0	1–2	1–0	1–0
Atlético Nacional	2–0		0–2	0–6	0–1	0–4	0–0	0–1	1–1	0–1
Árabe Unido	1–0	4–0		0–1	3–2	0–1	2–1	2–1	1–1	3–5
Atletico Veraguense	1–0	3–0	1–0		1–1	0–1	2–1	0–2	1–3	1–1
Chorrillo	1–3	2–2	1–0	1–1		1–1	1–1	1–2	1–0	1–3
Plaza Amador	2–1	1–0	2–1	0–0	1–2		2–0	3–1	1–2	1–1
Santa Gema	2–2	3–1	0–1	0–0	2–1	0–1		1–0	2–1	1–2
San Francisco	2–1	3–2	2–2	1–1	0–0	0–2	0–0		2–0	1–2
Sporting San Miguelito	0–0	2–3	1–1	1–1	0–0	1–2	1–0	5–1		0–3
Tauro	1–1	2–1	0–0	2–1	0–1	0–1	0–0	1–1	1–1	

Updated to match(es) played on 6 May 2017. Source:
Legend: Blue = home team win; Yellow = draw; Red = away team win.

=== Second stage ===
Semifinals
1	Plaza Amador	1	0	1
4	Árabe Unido	1	1	2
2	Tauro	1	2	3
3	Atletico Veraguense	1	1	2

Final
4	Árabe Unido	0
2	Tauro	1

==== Semifinals ====
First legs

12 May 2017

Árabe Unido	1 – 1	Plaza Amador
E. Small 81'		R. Barsallo 80'

Estadio Armando Dely Valdés
Referee: Victor Rios

14 May 2017

Atletico Veraguense	1 – 1	Tauro
H. Ward 55'		F. Baloy 64'

Estadio Omar Torrijos
Referee: Oliver Vergara

Second legs

20 May 2017

Plaza Amador	0 – 1	Árabe Unido
E. Small 78'

Estadio Maracaná de Panamá
Referee: Jafeth Perea

Arabe Unido won 2–1 on aggregate.

20 May 2017

Tauro	2 – 1	Atletico Veraguense
A. Polo 19'; A. Corpas 90+1'		C. Gallego 81'

Estadio Rommel Fernández
Referee: Ameth Sánchez

Tauro won 3–2 on aggregate.

==== Finals ====
Grand Final

May 27, 2017

Tauro	1 – 0	Árabe Unido
A. Polo 90+1'

Estadio Rommel Fernández
Referee: Victor Rios

Clausura 2017 champions

13th title

== List of foreign players in the league ==
This is a list of foreign players for the 2016-2017. The following players:

1. have played at least one game for the respective club.
2. have not been capped for the Panama national football team on any level, independently from the birthplace

Alianza

- (Argentina) Facundo Kroeck
- (Colombia) Robyn Pertuz
- (Colombia) Gerardo Negrete
- (Colombia) Mauricio Castaño

Arabe Unido

- (Dominican Republic) Miguel Lloyd

Atletico Nacional

- (Colombia) Manuel Murillo
- (Colombia) Andrés Santamaría

Atlético Veraguense

- (Colombia) Damaso Pichón
- (Colombia) Alexis Mendoza
- (Colombia) Walter Franco
- (Colombia) Arlinto Murillo

Chorillo

- (Brazil) Fabio Da Silva
- (Colombia) David Agudelo
- (Colombia) Jorge Henriquez
- (Colombia) Justin Arboleda

Plaza Amador

- (Venezuela) Frank Piedrahita
- (Venezuela) Daniel Blanco

Santa Gema

- (Colombia) Miguel Duque

San Francisco FC

- (Colombia) Wanegre Delgado de Armas
- (Colombia) Varcan Sterling

Sporting San Miguelito

- None

Tauro FC

- (Venezuela) Jose Peraza
- (Colombia) Carlos Sierra
- (Colombia) Ariel Bonilla

(player released mid season)

== Aggregate table ==
Pos	Team	Pld	W	D	L	GF	GA	GD	Pts	Qualification or relegation
1	Plaza Amador	36	21	13	2	47	18	+29	76	2017 CONCACAF League
2	Tauro	36	19	12	5	55	25	+30	69	2018 CONCACAF Champions League
3	Árabe Unido	36	16	9	11	51	37	+14	57	2017 CONCACAF League
4	Chorrillo	36	15	10	11	38	35	+3	55	2017 CONCACAF League (Note: Due to Guatemala's suspension from FIFA, its teams will not participate in the 2017-18 CONCACAF club competitions. Due to this, Panama gained an additional qualifier for the 2017 CONCACAF League.)
5	San Francisco	36	14	9	13	37	41	−4	51	
6	Atletico Veraguense	36	10	12	14	30	37	−7	42	
7	Santa Gema	36	10	11	15	29	31	−2	41	
8	Alianza	36	12	5	19	32	44	−12	41	
9	Sporting San Miguelito	36	7	12	17	32	45	−13	33	
10	Atlético Nacional (R)	36	5	7	24	24	62	−38	22	Relegation to 2017–18 Liga de Ascenso

Rules for classification: 1) points; 2) goal difference; 3) number of goals scored.
(R) Relegated
