= 2017–18 Liga Panameña de Fútbol season =

Liga Panameña de Fútbol
- Season: 2017–18
- Champions: Apertura: Chorrillo (3rd title); Clausura: Independiente (1st title)
- Champions League: Independiente
- CONCACAF League: Chorrillo; Árabe Unido; Tauro
- Matches: 65
- Goals: 134 (2.06 per match)
- Biggest home win: Plaza Amador 3-0 Chorrillo; Chorrillo 3-0 Atletico Veraguense
- Highest scoring: San Francisco 2-3 Atletico Veraguense

The 2017–18 Liga Panameña de Fútbol season (also known as the Liga Cable Onda) was the 28th season of top-flight football in Panama. The season began on 17 July 2017 and was scheduled to end in May 2018. Ten teams competed throughout the entire season.

== Teams ==
Atlético Nacional finished in 10th place in the overall table last season and were relegated to the Liga Nacional de Ascenso. Taking their place for this season are the overall champions of last season's Liga Nacional de Ascenso, Independiente.

Club	Home city	Stadium
Alianza	Panama City	Cancha de Entranamiento Luis Tapia
Árabe Unido	Colón	Armando Dely Valdes
Atletico Veraguense	Santiago de Veraguas	Aristocles "Toco" Castillo
Chorrillo	Panama City	Estadio Maracaná
Independiente	La Chorrera	Estadio Maracaná
Plaza Amador	Panama City	Estadio Maracaná
San Francisco	La Chorrera	Estadio Agustín Sánchez
Santa Gema	Arraiján	Estadio Agustín Sánchez
Sporting San Miguelito	San Miguelito	Cancha de Entrenamiento Luis Tapia
Tauro	Panama City	Estadio Rommel Fernandez

== Managerial changes ==
=== Before the start of the season ===
Team	Outgoing manager	Manner of departure	Date of vacancy	Replaced by	Date of appointment	Position in table
TBD	(Brazil) TBD	Sacked	May 2017	(Uruguay) TBD	May 2017	th (TBD)
Alianza	(Panama) Mario Anthony Torres	Sacked	May 2017	(Panama) Juan Carlos Cubilla	May 2017	th (TBD)
Atletico Veraguense	(Colombia) Andres Dominguez	Resigned	June 2017	(Colombia) Edgar Ramos	June 2017	th (TBD)
Santa Gema	(Panama) Leopoldo Lee	Sacked	June 2017	(Panama) José Mario Anthony Torres	June 2017	th (TBD)
Independiente	(Panama)	Sacked	May 2017	(Panama) Jorge Dely Valdés	May 2017	th (TBD)
San Francisco	(Panama) Pascual Moreno	Interimship moved to full time coach	May 2017	(Panama) Pascual Moreno	May 2017	th (TBD)

=== During the Apertura season ===
Team	Outgoing manager	Manner of departure	Date of vacancy	Replaced by	Date of appointment	Position in table
San Francisco	(Panama) Pascual Moreno	Sacked	August 2017	(Colombia) Andres Dominguez	August 2017	10th (Apertura 2017)
Alianza	(Panama) Juan Carlos Cubilla	Sacked	August 2017	(Panama) Daniel Valencia	August 2017	10th (Apertura 2017)
Sporting San Miguelito	(Colombia) Javier Miller	Sacked	August 2017	(Panama) Víctor René Mendieta	August 2017	10th (Apertura 2017)

=== Between Apertura and Clausura seasons ===
Team	Outgoing manager	Manner of departure	Date of vacancy	Replaced by	Date of appointment	Position in table
Plaza Amador	(Colombia) Jair Palcios	Contract finished	November 2017	(Spain) Juan Carlos García	December 2017	12th (Apertura 2017)
Alianza	(Panama) Daniel Valencia	Moved back to Assistant coach	November 2017	(Colombia) Jair Palacios	November 2017	12th (Apertura 2017)
Atletico Veraguense	(Colombia) Edgar Ramos	Moved back to Assistant coach	November 2017	(Panama) Marcos Pimentel	November 2017	12th (Apertura 2017)
Independiente	(Panama) Jorge Dely Valdés	Sacked	November 2017	(Panama) Donaldo Gonzales	November 2017	12th (Apertura 2017)
Arabe Unidos	(Colombia) Sergio Guzman	Sacked	December 2017	(Colombia) Carlos Ruiz	January 2018	12th (Apertura 2017)

=== During the Clausura season ===
Team	Outgoing manager	Manner of departure	Date of vacancy	Replaced by	Date of appointment	Position in table
Atletico Veraguense	(Panama) Marcos Pimentel	Sacked	February 2018	(Colombia) Javier Reales	February 2018	10th (Clausura 2018)
Sporting San Miguelito	(Panama) Victor Rene Mendieta	Sacked	February 2018	(Panama) Noel Guiterrez	February 2018	10th (Clausura 2018)
Chorillo	(Colombia) Richard	Resigned	March 2018	(Colombia) Óscar Upegui	March 2018	10th (Clausura 2018)

== 2017 Apertura ==
=== Personnel and sponsoring (2017 Apertura) ===
Team	Chairman	Head coach	Kitmaker	Shirt sponsor
Alianza	TBD	(Panama) Daniel Valencia x	keuka	Balboa
Árabe Unido	TBD	(Colombia) Juan Sergio Guzmán x	kelme	Pizza Hut
Atletico Veraguense	(Panama) TBD	(Colombia) Edgar Ramos x	keuka	EGS, NCO
Chorrillo		(Colombia) Richard Parra x	adidas	McDonald's, Cremoso
Independiente	(Panama)	(Panama) Jorge Dely Valdés x	adidas	
Plaza Amador	TBD	(Colombia) Jair Palacios x	umbro	Páguela Facil, Frosquito, Mercana
Santa Gema		(Panama) Jose Mario Torres x	kelme	ShowPro
San Francisco	Julio Quijano	(Colombia) Andres Dominguez x	puma	KFC, Canon, Banco General
Sporting San Miguelito	TBD	(Colombia) Javier Miller x	keuka	Kenwood, Hyundai
Tauro	TBD	(Panama) Rolando Palma x	Patrick	Publica Amarias, Dominos, Estrella Azul, Argos, Capital Bank

=== Standings ===
Pos	Team	Pld	W	D	L	GF	GA	GD	Pts	Qualification
1	Tauro	18	9	7	2	25	13	+12	34	Qualified to the Final Round
2	Plaza Amador	18	9	6	3	22	12	+10	33	Qualified to the Final Round
3	Árabe Unido	18	8	9	1	21	11	+10	33	Qualified to the Final Round
4	Chorrillo	18	6	8	4	21	17	+4	26	Qualified to the Final Round
5	Atletico Veraguense	18	7	4	7	22	27	−5	25	
6	Independiente	18	6	4	8	11	18	−7	22	
7	San Francisco	18	5	5	8	23	24	−1	20	
8	Sporting San Miguelito	18	3	8	7	17	22	−5	17	
9	Santa Gema	18	3	6	9	14	21	−7	15	
10	Alianza	18	3	5	10	12	23	−11	14	

Updated to match(es) played on 1 October 2017. Source: Soccerway
Rules for classification: 1) points; 2) goal difference; 3) number of goals scored.

=== Results ===
Home \ Away	ALI	ÁRU	ATV	CHO	IND	PA	SAN	SF	SSM	TAU
Alianza		0–1	2–0	0–0	0–0	1–2	0–0	0–2	2–2	0–0
Árabe Unido	2–1		4–1	1–1	2–1	1–1	2–1	0–0	1–1	0–0
Atletico Veraguense	3–1	2–1		1–1	0–1	0–0	2–1	2–2	1–0	1–2
Chorrillo	2–1	1–1	3–0		1–0	1–1	1–0	1–1	2–1	2–0
Independiente	1–0	0–1	0–2	1–0		1–3	1–0	2–1	0–0	0–2
Plaza Amador	0–1	0–1	1–0	3–0	2–0		1–0	1–1	1–1	1–0
Santa Gema	2–0	1–1	0–1	2–1	1–1	0–1		0–2	2–3	0–0
San Francisco	3–0	0–2	2–3	1–1	0–1	2–1	2–3		1–0	1–2
Sporting San Miguelito	1–3	0–0	2–2	0–2	2–0	1–2	0–0	1–0		2–2
Tauro	2–0	0–0	4–1	2–1	1–1	1–1	2–0	4–3	1–0	

Updated to match(es) played on 1 October 2017. Source:
Legend: Blue = home team win; Yellow = draw; Red = away team win.

=== Second stage ===
Semifinals
1	Tauro	0	1	1
4	Chorrillo	0	2	2
2	Plaza Amador	1	0	1(4)
3	Árabe Unido	0	1	1(5)

Final
Chorrillo	5
Árabe Unido	1

==== Semifinals ====
First legs

18 November 2017

Chorrillo	0 – 0	Tauro
None		None

25 November 2017
8:00 pm

Tauro	1 – 2	Chorrillo
Jose Gomez 58'		Roberto Blackburn 28' 45'

Second legs

19 November 2017
6:00 pm

Árabe Unido	0 – 1	Plaza Amador
None		Ernesto Sinclair 60'

25 November 2017
5:00 pm

Plaza Amador	(4)0 – 1(5)	Árabe Unido
None		Nelson Barahona 46'

==== Finals ====
Grand Final

3 December 2017

Chorrillo	5 – 1	Árabe Unido
Alfredo Stephens 7' 27'; Samir Ramirez 63'; Rolando Blackburn 82'; Luis Hurtado 87'		Enrico Small (pen.), 73'

Estadio Rommel Fernández Gutiérrez
Referee: Ameth Sanchez

Apertura 2017 champions

3rd title

== 2018 Clausura ==
=== Personnel and sponsoring (2018 Clausura) ===
Team	Chairman	Head coach	Kitmaker	Shirt sponsor
Alianza	TBD	(Colombia) Jair Palacios x	Lotto	Balboa
Árabe Unido	TBD	(Colombia) Carlos Ruiz Velásquez x	Puma	Pizza Hut
Independiente F.C.		(Panama) Donaldo Gonzalez x	Lotto	Subway
Atletico Veraguense	TBD	(Colombia) Javier Reales x	GEMS	EGS, NCO
Chorrillo		(Colombia) Óscar Upegui x	Lotto	McDonald's, Cremoso
Plaza Amador	TBD	(Spain) Juan Carlos García x	Diadora	Páguela Facil, Frosquito, Mercana
Santa Gema		(Panama) José Mario Anthony "Chalate" Torres x	Mitre	ShowPro
San Francisco	Julio Quijano	(Colombia) Andrés Domínguez x	Lotto	KFC, Canon, Banco General
Sporting San Miguelito	TBD	(Panama) Noel Guiterrez x	Joma	Kenwood, Hyundai
Tauro	TBD	(Colombia) Sergio Angulo x	Patrick	Publicar Páginas Amarillas

=== Standings ===
Pos	Team	Pld	W	D	L	GF	GA	GD	Pts	Qualification
1	Árabe Unido	18	8	6	4	23	16	+7	30	Qualified to the Final Round
2	Independiente	18	8	5	5	28	21	+7	29	Qualified to the Final Round
3	San Francisco	18	7	8	3	19	12	+7	29	Qualified to the Final Round
4	Tauro	18	7	7	4	25	21	+4	28	Qualified to the Final Round
5	Alianza	18	7	6	5	21	13	+8	27	
6	Chorrillo	18	5	8	5	15	17	−2	23	
7	Sporting San Miguelito	18	5	7	6	22	26	−4	22	
8	Santa Gema	18	4	9	5	11	13	−2	21	
9	Plaza Amador	18	5	4	9	16	20	−4	19	
10	Atletico Veraguense	18	2	4	12	13	34	−21	10	

Updated to match(es) played on season start. Source: Soccerway
Rules for classification: 1) points; 2) goal difference; 3) number of goals scored.

=== Results ===
Home \ Away	ALI	ÁRU	ATV	CHO	IND	PA	SAN	SF	SSM	TAU
Alianza								2–1		
Árabe Unido			2–0							
Atletico Veraguense										
Chorrillo						1–0				
Independiente										
Plaza Amador										
Santa Gema									1–1	
San Francisco										
Sporting San Miguelito										
Tauro										

Updated to match(es) played on season start. Source:
Legend: Blue = home team win; Yellow = draw; Red = away team win.

=== Second stage ===
Semifinals
1	Árabe Unido	0	2	2
4	Tauro	2	2	4
2	Independiente	0	3	3
3	San Francisco	1	1	2

Final
Tauro	0
Independiente	1

==== Semifinals ====
First legs

5 May 2018
7:00 pm

Tauro	2 – 0	Árabe Unido
Marcos Sanchez 24'; Adalberto Carrasquilla 90'		None

11 May 2018
9:00 pm

Árabe Unido	2 – 2	Tauro
Carlos Small 15'; Joseph Cox 80'		Enrico Small 103' 106'

Second legs

4 May 2018
9:00 pm

San Francisco	1 – 0	Independiente
Cristian Zuniga 39'		None

12 May 2018
8:00 pm

Independiente	3 – 1	San Francisco
Jose Fajardo 56' 66'; Eric Vasquez (o.g.)		Julian Verlarde 24'

==== Finals ====
Grand Final

19 May 2018

Tauro	0 – 1	Independiente
None		Omar Browne (pen.), 39'

Clausura 2018 champions

1st title

== List of foreign players in the league ==
This is a list of foreign players for the 2017-2018. The following players:

1. have played at least one game for the respective club.
2. have not been capped for the Panama national football team on any level, independently from the birthplace

Alianza

- (Colombia) Robyn Pertuz x
- (Colombia) Edwin Grueso x
- (Colombia) Mauricio Castaño x

Arabe Unido

- (Dominican Republic) Miguel Lloyd x
- (Colombia) Johnatan Mosquera x

Atlético Veraguense

- (Colombia) Carlos Gallego x
- (Colombia) Humberto Mendoza x
- (Colombia) Yonaider Ortega x
- (Colombia) Jonathan Villa x
- (Colombia) Jesus Lopez x

Chorillo

- (Colombia) Ariel Bonilla x
- (Colombia) Andres Escobar x
- (Colombia) David Loaiza x
- (Colombia) Julian Munoz x

Independiente

- (Colombia) David Uribe x
- (Colombia) Gerardo Negrete x
- (Cuba) Arichel Hernandez x
- (Spain) Michel Salgado x
- (Argentina) Abel Marcovecchio x

Plaza Amador

- (Colombia) Lid Carabali x
- (Colombia) Jose Murillo x
- (Venezuela) Daniel Blanco x

Santa Gema

- (Argentina) Juan Cano x
- (Colombia) Jhoan Romero x
- (Colombia) Milton Segura x

San Francisco FC

- (Brazil) Caio x
- (Colombia) Damaso Pichon x
- (Colombia) Juan Esteban Ospina x
- (Colombia) Thomas Sierra x
- (Colombia) Cristian Zuniga x

Sporting San Miguelito

- (Colombia) Wilmer Largacha x
- (Colombia) Jorge Sandoval x

Tauro FC

- (Colombia) Gustavo Chara x
- (Argentina) Juan Tamburelli x

(player released mid season)

== Aggregate table ==
Pos	Team	Pld	W	D	L	GF	GA	GD	Pts	Qualification or relegation
1	Árabe Unido	36	16	15	5	44	27	+17	63	2018 CONCACAF League
2	Tauro	36	16	14	6	51	34	+17	62	2018 CONCACAF League
3	Plaza Amador	36	14	10	12	38	32	+6	52	
4	Independiente	36	14	9	13	39	39	0	51	2019 CONCACAF Champions League
5	San Francisco	36	12	13	11	42	36	+6	49	
6	Chorrillo	36	11	16	9	37	35	+2	49	2018 CONCACAF League
7	Alianza	36	10	11	15	33	36	−3	41	
8	Sporting San Miguelito	36	8	15	13	39	49	−10	39	
9	Santa Gema	36	7	15	14	25	34	−9	36	
10	Atletico Veraguense	36	9	8	19	35	61	−26	35	Relegation to 2018–19 Liga de Ascenso

Rules for classification: 1) points; 2) goal difference; 3) number of goals scored.
