= Michael Amir Murillo =

Panamanian footballer (born 1996)

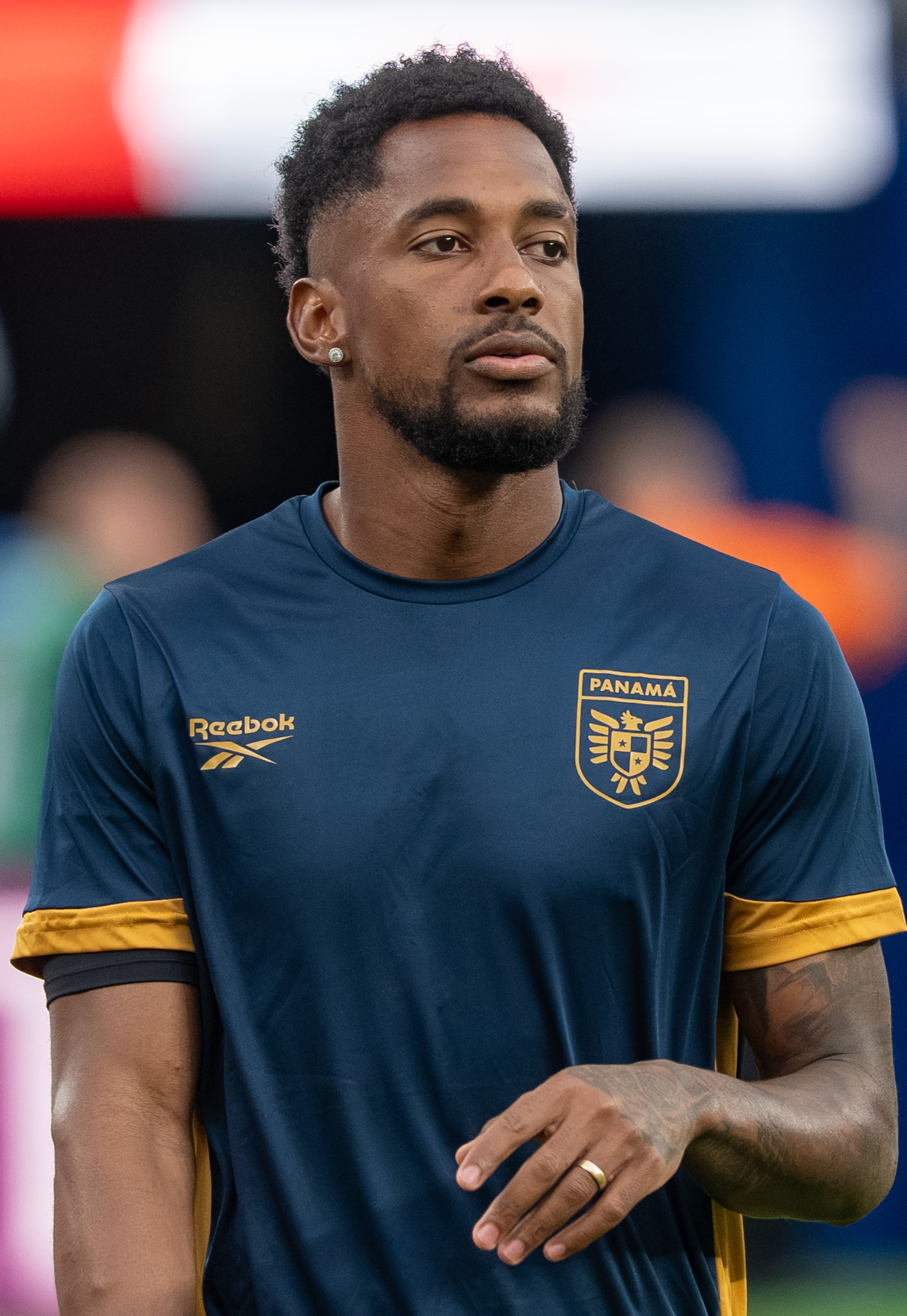
- Murillo with Panama in 2026

Personal information
- Full name: Michael Amir Murillo Bermúdez
- Date of birth: 11 February 1996 (age 30)
- Place of birth: Panama City, Panama
- Height: 1.83 m (6 ft 0 in)
- Position: Right-back

Team information
- Current team: Beşiktaş
- Number: 62

Youth career
- –2014: San Francisco

Senior career*
Years	Team	Apps	(Gls)
2014–2017	San Francisco	42	(3)
2017	→ New York Red Bulls (loan)	17	(2)
2017	→ New York Red Bulls II (loan)	2	(0)
2018–2019	New York Red Bulls	45	(2)
2020–2023	Anderlecht	107	(10)
2023–2026	Marseille	62	(6)
2026–	Beşiktaş	23	(2)

International career^{‡}
2015	Panama U20	6	(1)
2015	Panama Olympic	3	(0)
2016–	Panama	102	(9)
Medal record
Men's football
Representing Panama
CONCACAF U-20 Championship
Runner-up	2015 Jamaica	Team
Copa Centroamericana
Runner-up	2017 Panama	Team
CONCACAF Gold Cup
Runner-up	2023 United States–Canada	Team
- * Club domestic league appearances and goals as of 22 November 2026 ‡ National team caps and goals as of 15 November 2026

Michael Amir Murillo Bermúdez (born 11 February 1996) is a Panamanian professional footballer who plays as a right-back for Süper Lig club Beşiktaş and the Panama national team.

== Club career ==
=== San Francisco ===
Born in Panama City, Murillo graduated from San Francisco's youth setup, and made his senior debut in the 2014–15 campaign, aged only 18. He quickly established himself as a first team regular and had his best season in 2015–16 in which he made 21 league appearances and scored 3 goals. On 25 October 2015, Murillo scored his first two goals for Los Monjes in a 2–1 victory over Alianza.

On 10 December 2015, Murillo played the entire match for San Francisco in the first edition of the Copa Panamá, as his side won the final against Chepo 5–4 on penalties, as the match finished 0–0 after extra time, to win their first title. On 26 August 2015, Murillo helped San Francisco to a famous 2–1 victory over Mexican side Querétaro FC in a 2015–16 CONCACAF Champions League match.

=== New York Red Bulls ===
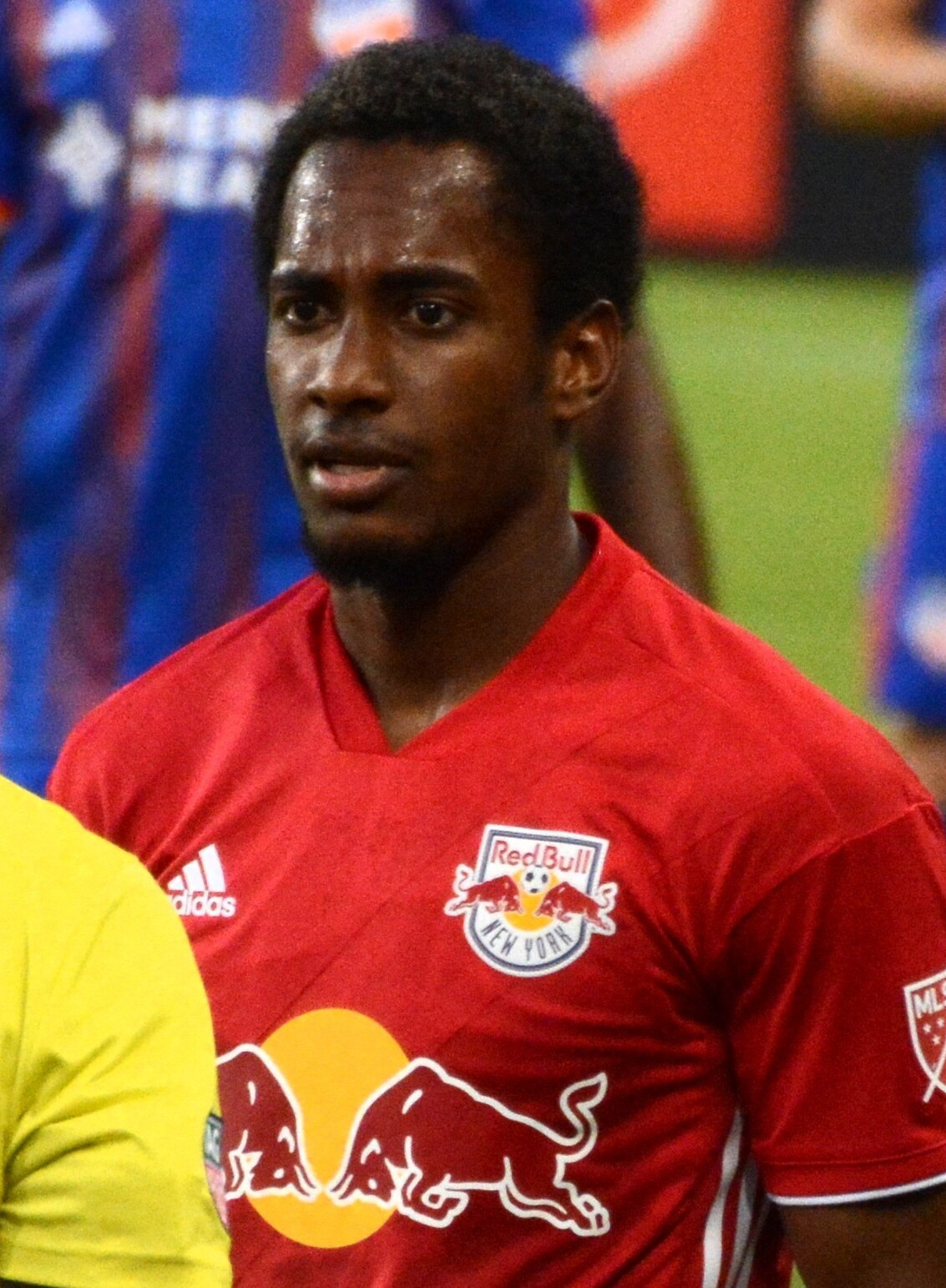
Murillo with New York Red Bulls in 2019

On 18 February 2017, it was announced that Murillo was joining New York Red Bulls on a season-long loan. On 29 July 2017, he scored his first goal for New York in a 4–0 rout over Montreal Impact. On 22 October 2017 Murillo scored his second goal for New York in a 2–1 victory over rival D.C. United, in the last match played at RFK Stadium. The Red Bulls exercised their contract option to permanently sign him on 11 November 2017.

On 13 March 2018, Murillo assisted on two goals in New York's 3–1 victory over Club Tijuana in the CONCACAF Champions League, helping the club advance to semifinals of the Champions League for the first time. On 14 April 2018, he scored his first goal of the season for New York in a 3–1 victory over Montreal Impact. He was also selected to participate for the New York Red Bulls in the MLS All-Star Game against Italy's Juventus on 1 August 2018 in the Mercedes-Benz Stadium in Atlanta, Georgia, US, making him the first Panamanian to participate in an MLS All-Star game.

During his time with the Red Bulls, Murillo totalled 80 appearances in all competitions, scoring four goals and providing eight assists and winning the 2018 Supporters Shield with the club.

=== Anderlecht ===
On 6 December 2019, the Red Bulls announced the transfer of Murillo to Belgian side Anderlecht. Murillo scored his first goal for his new club on 23 February 2020, during a 6–1 victory versus Eupen.

=== Marseille ===
On 30 August 2023, Murillo joined French side Olympique de Marseille.

=== Beşiktaş ===
On 6 February 2026, Murillo joined Beşiktaş on a three-and-a-half-year deal with an option for another year for a reported fee of €5 million.

== International career ==
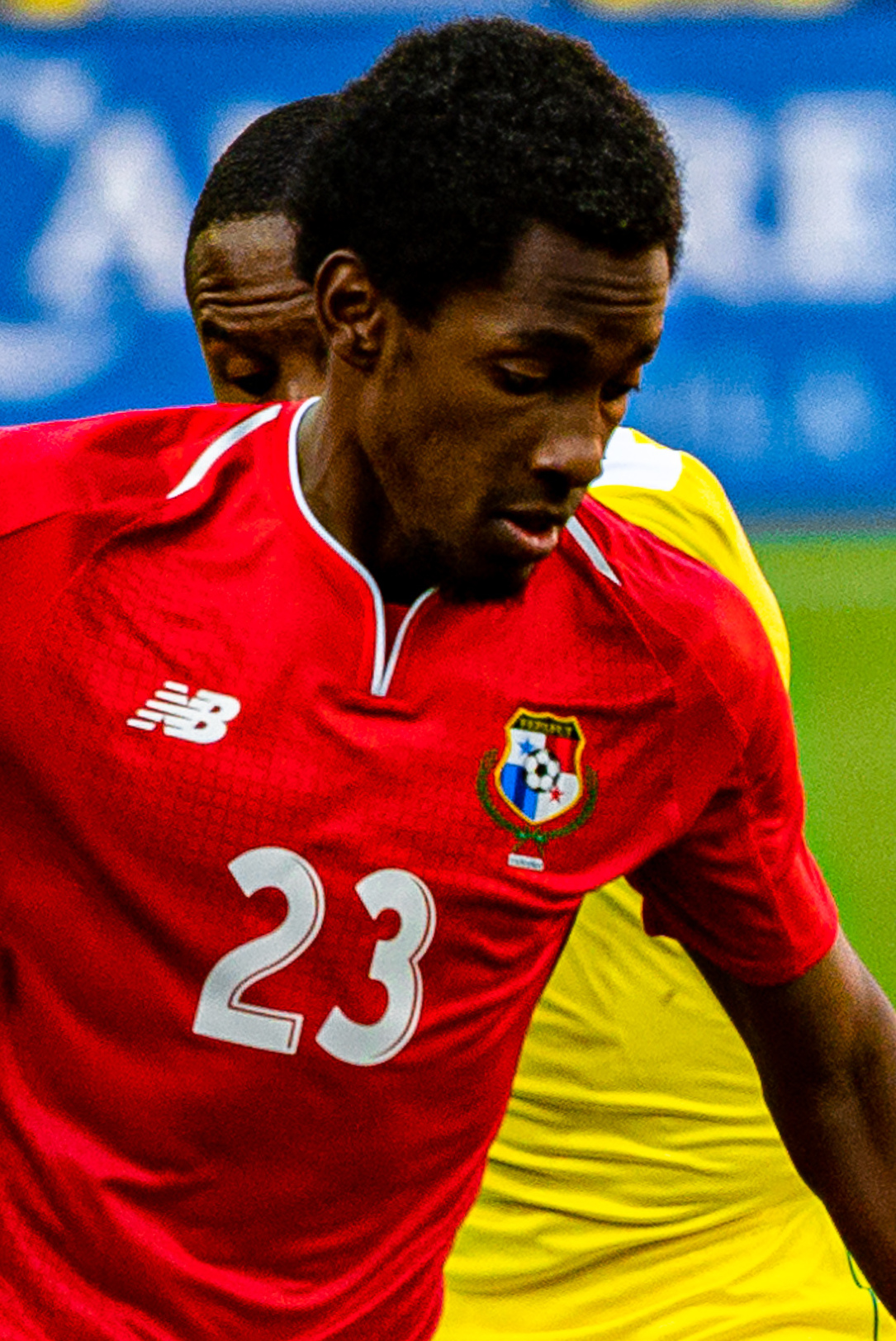
Murillo with Panama at the 2019 CONCACAF Gold Cup

Murillo was called up for the Panama national team, making his debut in 2016. On 27 April 2016, Murillo scored his first goal with Panama in a 2–0 victory over Martinique.

Murillo started three of Panama's ten CONCACAF Hexagonal matches in the final round of 2018 World Cup qualifying, helping Panama qualify for its first World Cup. In May 2018 he was named to Panama's final 23-man squad for the 2018 World Cup in Russia. Murillo was the starting right back in Panama's group stage losses to Belgium and England. He received a yellow card in each of the two matches, making him ineligible to play in the team's final group match against Tunisia.

== Career statistics ==
=== Club ===
As of match played 19 September 2026

Appearances and goals by club, season and competition
Club	Season	League			National cup (Note: Includes Copa Panamá, U.S. Open Cup, Belgian Cup, Coupe de France, Turkish Cup)		Continental		Other		Total	
Club	Season	Division	Apps	Goals	Apps	Goals	Apps	Goals	Apps	Goals	Apps	Goals
San Francisco	2014–15	Liga Panameña de Fútbol	8	0	—		—		—		8	0
San Francisco	2015–16	Liga Panameña de Fútbol	21	3	5	0	3 (Note: Appearances in CONCACAF Champions League)	0	—		29	3
San Francisco	2016–17	Liga Panameña de Fútbol	13	0	1	0	—		—		14	0
San Francisco	San Francisco total		42	3	6	0	3	0	—		51	3
New York Red Bulls (loan)	2017	MLS	17	2	2	0	—		3 (Note: Appearances in MLS Cup playoffs)	0	22	2
New York Red Bulls	2018	MLS	23	1	0	0	6	0	4	0	33	1
New York Red Bulls	2019	MLS	22	1	0	0	3	0	—		25	1
New York Red Bulls	Red Bulls total		62	4	2	0	9	0	7	0	80	4
Anderlecht	2019–20	Belgian Pro League	8	1	0	0	—		—		8	1
Anderlecht	2020–21	Belgian Pro League	36	4	3	0	0	0	—		39	4
Anderlecht	2021–22	Belgian Pro League	34	2	5	1	3 (Note: Appearances in UEFA Europa Conference League)	0	—		42	3
Anderlecht	2022–23	Belgian Pro League	29	3	2	0	14	3	—		45	6
Anderlecht	Anderlecht total		107	10	10	1	17	3	—		134	14
Marseille	2023–24	Ligue 1	16	3	2	0	7 (Note: Appearances in UEFA Europa League)	0	—		25	3
Marseille	2024–25	Ligue 1	30	1	2	0	—		—		32	1
Marseille	2025–26	Ligue 1	16	2	2	0	6 (Note: Appearances in UEFA Champions League)	0	1 (Note: Appearance in Trophée des Champions)	0	25	2
Marseille	Marseille total		62	6	6	0	13	0	1	0	82	6
Beşiktaş	2025–26	Süper Lig	12	1	3	1	—		—		15	2
Beşiktaş	2026–27	Süper Lig	4	1	0	0	7	2	—		11	3
Beşiktaş	Beşiktaş total		16	2	3	1	7	2	—		26	5
Career total			289	25	27	2	49	5	8	0	373	32

=== International ===
As of match played 15 November 2026

Appearances and goals by national team and year
National team	Year	Apps	Goals
Panama	2016	5	1
Panama	2017	14	1
Panama	2018	11	0
Panama	2019	8	0
Panama	2020	2	0
Panama	2021	11	0
Panama	2022	11	2
Panama	2023	9	4
Panama	2024	11	1
Panama	2025	9	0
Panama	2026	12	0
Total		102	9

Scores and results list Panama's goal tally first, score column indicates score after each Murillo goal (includes one unofficial goal).

List of international goals scored by Michael Amir Murillo
No.	Date	Venue	Opponent	Score	Result	Competition
1	27 April 2016	Stade Pierre-Aliker, Fort-de-France, Martinique	Martinique	1–0	2–0	Friendly
2	15 July 2017	FirstEnergy Stadium, Cleveland, United States	Martinique	1–0	3–0	2017 CONCACAF Gold Cup
3	27 September 2022	Bahrain National Stadium, Riffa, Bahrain	Bahrain	1–0	2–0	Friendly
4	18 November 2022	Mohammed bin Zayed Stadium, Abu Dhabi, United Arab Emirates	Cameroon	1–1	1–1	Friendly
5	10 June 2023	Estadio Universidad Latina, Penonomé, Panama	Nicaragua	1–1	3–2	Friendly
6	10 June 2023	Estadio Universidad Latina, Penonomé, Panama	Nicaragua	2–2	3–2	Friendly
7	30 June 2023	Red Bull Arena, Harrison, United States	Martinique	2–0	2–1	2023 CONCACAF Gold Cup
8	16 November 2023	Estadio Ricardo Saprissa Aymá, San José, Costa Rica	Costa Rica	1–0	3–0	2023–24 CONCACAF Nations League A
9	23 June 2024	Hard Rock Stadium, Miami Gardens, United States	Uruguay	1–3	1–3	2024 Copa América

== Honours ==
San Francisco

- Copa Panamá: 2015

New York Red Bulls

- MLS Supporters' Shield: 2018
- U.S. Open Cup runner-up: 2017

Anderlecht

- Belgian Cup runner-up: 2021–22

Panama U20

- CONCACAF U-20 Championship runner-up: 2015

Panama

- CONCACAF Gold Cup runner-up: 2023
- CONCACAF Nations League runner-up: 2024–25
- Copa Centroamericana runner-up: 2017

Individual

- CONCACAF Champions League Best XI: 2018
- MLS All-Star: 2018

== See also ==
- List of men's footballers with 100 or more international caps
