= 2009 Club León season =

2009 season
- President: Abraham Batarse
- Manager: Salvador Reyes, Jr.
- Stadium: Nou Camp, León, Guanajuato, Mexico
Home colours	Away colours	Third colours

Club León debuted in the Apertura 2009.

== Current roster ==
Note: Flags indicate national team as defined under FIFA eligibility rules; some limited exceptions apply. Players may hold more than one non-FIFA nationality.

No.	Pos.	Nation	Player
1	GK	MEX	Éder Patiño
2	DF	MEX	Fernando Ibarra
3	DF	MEX	Juan Manuel García
4	DF	MEX	Addiel Aarón Reyes
5	DF	MEX	Ricardo Jiménez
6	MF	ESA	Julio Enrique Martínez
7	MF	MEX	Hibert Ruíz
8	FW	MEX	Ismael Valadéz
9	FW	MEX	Luis Orozco (captain)
10	FW	ESA	Rodolfo Zelaya
11	FW	MEX	Luis Humberto Nieves
12	MF	ESA	Cristian Castillo
13	MF	MEX	Héctor Omar Macías
14	DF	MEX	Nicolás René Ruvalcaba
15	FW	MEX	Miguel Angeles
16	MF	MEX	José Aurelio Parra

No.	Pos.	Nation	Player
17	MF	MEX	Daniel Silva
18	DF	MEX	Hugo Emiliano Rodríguez
19	DF	MEX	Jose Daniel Amador
20	MF	MEX	Carlos Alanís
21	DF	MEX	Daniel Duarte
22	MF	MEX	José Dolores González
23	GK	MEX	Leonardo Galván
24	GK	MEX	Francisco González
25	MF	MEX	Rodolfo Del Real
26	MF	MEX	Julio César Ceja
27	MF	MEX	Atremio Jonathan Alemán
28	FW	MEX	Arturo Chávez
29	MF	MEX	Iván Ceniceros
30	MF	MEX	Pedro Emmanuel Rodríguez
31	DF	MEX	Joel Morales
34	DF	MEX	Aldo Polo

== Transfers ==
In

Player	From	League	Date
(El Salvador) Cristian Castillo	Alianza	(El Salvador) Primera División de Fútbol Profesional	2009
(El Salvador) Julio Enrique Martínez	Alianza	(El Salvador) Primera División de Fútbol Profesional	2009
(El Salvador) Rodolfo Zelaya	Alianza	(El Salvador) Primera División de Fútbol Profesional	2009

Out

Player	To	League	Date

== 2009 Apertura ==
=== Position by fixture ===
Round	1	2	3	4	5	6	7	8	9	10	11	12	13	14	15	16	17
Ground	A	H	A	H	A	H	A	H	A	H	A	H	A	A	A	H	H
Result	L	W	L	W	D	D	L	W	D	W	L	L	L	W	W	W	L
Position	12	8	13	7	5	4	8	5	7	3	6	9	10	11	11	8	10

Updated to match(es) played on 7 November. Source: Competitive Matches
A = Away; H = Home; W = Win; D = Draw; L = Loss

=== Standings ===
Pos	Team	Pld	W	D	L	GF	GA	GD	Pts
8	Merida	16	6	6	4	18	15	+3	24
9	Pumas Morelos	16	4	9	3	21	19	+2	21
10	Léon	16	6	3	7	27	26	+1	21
11	Tijuana	16	5	5	6	18	14	+4	20
12	Durango	16	5	5	6	23	24	−1	20

Updated to match(es) played on 22 November 2009. Source: FeMexFut
Rules for classification: 1) points; 2) goal difference; 3) number of goals scored.

=== Top 5 Goalscorers ===
Rank	Player	Club	Goals
1	(Mexico) Luis Orozco	León	7
2	(Mexico) Luis Nieves	León	5
3	(Mexico) Ismael Valadéz	León	4
4	(El Salvador) Julio Enrique Martínez	León	3
5	(Mexico) Aldo Polo	León	2
