= Copa Panamá =

- Logo of the Copa Panamá
- Founded: 2015
- Region: Panama
- Teams: 32
- Current champions: Santa Gema
- Most championships: San Francisco; Santa Gema (1 title each)
- 2018–19 Copa Panamá

The Copa Panamá (Spanish for Panama Cup, officially known as Copa Cable Onda Satelital because of its sponsorship with Cable Onda) is a Panamanian football cup competition. Its first edition was held in 2015.

The competition is open to eligible clubs down to the third tier of the Panamanian football league system – all 10 and 14 teams from the Liga Panameña de Fútbol and Liga Nacional de Ascenso respectively participate as well as 8 of the highest ranking amateur teams in the Copa Rommel Fernández tournament based on the results and points they obtained during the FIFA calendar year prior to the start of the cup.

While previous domestic cup competition in Panama existed during the amateur era, the Copa Panamá represents the first time this type of competition is organized by the Panamanian Football Federation.

== Format ==
The competition is a knockout tournament with pairings for each round made in advance; the draw for the whole competition is made before any matches are played. Each tie is played as a single leg, with the exception of the two-legged quarter-finals and semi-finals. If a match is drawn, extra time is played and in the event of a draw after 120 minutes, a penalty shoot-out is contested.

There are a total of 5 rounds in the competition which begins in August. In the single leg ties clubs from lower-ranking leagues are given field preference when facing opponents from a higher-ranked league.

== List of finals ==
Season	Location	Winners	Runners-up	Score
2015	Estadio Maracaná, Panama City	San Francisco	Chepo	0–0 (5–4 pen.)
2016–17	Estadio Maracaná, Panama City	Santa Gema	Centenario	2–1
2018–19	Estadio Maracaná, Panama City	Costa del Este	Universitario	1–1 (4–3 pen.)

== Performances ==
Club	Winners	Last Final Won	Runners-up	Last Final Lost
San Francisco	1	2015		
Santa Gema	1	2017		
Costa del Este	1	2019		
Chepo			1	2015
Centenario			1	2017
Universitario			1	2019

== Top goalscorers by season ==
Season	Player	Club	Goals
2015	(Panama) Sergio Moreno	Chorrillo	5
