= 2016–17 Copa Panamá =

Copa Cable Onda Satelital

Tournament details
- Country: Panama
- Venue(s): Estadio Maracaná, Panama City
- Dates: 20 September 2016 – 5 April 2017
- Teams: 48

Final positions
- Champions: Santa Gema
- Runners-up: Centenario

The 2016–17 Copa Panamá (officially known as Copa Cable Onda Satelital because of its sponsorship with Cable Onda) was the 2nd season of the annual Panamanian knockout football cup competition. Forty-eight clubs from the first to the third tier of the Panamanian football league system participated in this year's competition.

== Preliminary round ==
20 September 2016

Independiente Darién 1 - 3 Colón C-3

Deportivo Palmas Bellas 3 - 0 Atlético Nacional

Atlético Junior 1 - 3 Sporting San Miguelito

Millenium Juan Díaz 0 - 4 Azuero

21 September 2016

Virgen del Carmen 1 - 0 Alianza

Atlético Millonario 0 - 3 Tierra Firme

Real Chorrillito 0 - 3 Panama Viejo

Galaxy 1 - 7 Árabe Unido

27 September 2016

Bugabita 1 - 1 (3 - 5 P) Deportivo Vista Alegre

Darién FC 0 - 8 Santa Gema

Arsenal 0 - 1 New York Colón

Promesas de Dios 1 - 1 (3 - 1 P) Independiente

28 September 2016

Chigoré 1 - 3 Centenario

San Martín 5 - 0 Atlético Chiriquí

Alianza 51 1 - 5 Leones de América

San Antonio Herrera 0 - 2 Costa del Este

== Round of 32 ==
18 October 2016

Virgen del Carmen 1 - 0 Bambu

Deportivo Vista Alegre 0 - 0 (2 - 3 P) Río Abajo

Colón C-3 0 - 2 San Francisco

19 October 2016

Centenario 0 - 0 (3 - 0 P) Chorrillo

River Plate 2 - 2 (5 - 3 P) New York Colón

Promesas de Dios 2 - 3 Panamá Oeste

Costa del Este 1 - 0 Plaza Amador

25 October 2016

Deportivo Palmas Bellas 0 - 4 Deportivo San Miguelito

San Antonio Herrera 1 - 2 San Martín

Santa Gema 5 - 1 Atlético Veraguense

Panama Viejo 0 - 0 (4 - 3 P) Tauro

26 October 2016

Sporting París 0 - 4 Azuero

La Barriada 0 - 4 Árabe Unido

Halcones 1 - 3 Sporting San Miguelito

Santo Domingo 1 - 1 (3 - 5 P) Leones de América

Deportivo Junior 0 - 1 Tierra Firme

== Round of 16 ==
31 January 2017

Río Abajo 2 - 0 San Francisco

Virgen del Carmen 0 - 5 Árabe Unido

Deportivo San Miguelito 0 - 1 Sporting San Miguelito

Panama Viejo 4 - 0 Tierra Firme

1 February 2017

Centenario 1 - 1 (3 - 1 P) Panamá Oeste

San Martín 0 - 2 Costa del Este

Santa Gema 4 - 1 Leones de América

River Plate 0 - 0 (4 - 5 P) Azuero

== Quarter-finals ==
7 March 2017

Panama Viejo 1 - 0 Río Abajo

Centenario 1 - 1 (5 - 4 P) Árabe Unido

8 March 2017

Azuero 0 - 2 Sporting San Miguelito

Costa del Este 1 - 2 Santa Gema

== Semi-finals ==
22 March 2017

Centenario 1 - 0 Sporting San Miguelito

Panama Viejo 0 - 0 (2 - 4 P) Santa Gema

== Final ==
5 April 2017

Centenario 1 - 2 Santa Gema
