= Reggie Arosemena =

Panamanian footballer (born 1986)

Personal information
- Full name: Reggie Arosemena Henríquez
- Date of birth: September 9, 1986 (age 40)
- Place of birth: Panama City, Panama
- Height: 1.72 m (5 ft 7 1/2 in)
- Position: Attacking midfielder

Youth career
- Sporting San Miguelito

Senior career*
Years	Team	Apps	(Gls)
2004–2006	Sporting San Miguelito	47	(11)
2005–2010	Tauro	78	(15)
2010–2012	→ Sporting SM (loan)	16	(0)
2012–2014	Río Abajo	47	(3)
2014	Chorrillo	10	(0)
2015	Alianza	15	(1)

International career^{‡}
2004–2005	Panama U-20	7	(2)
2006–2013	Panama	13	(1)
- * Club domestic league appearances and goals as of 28 June 2009 ‡ National team caps and goals as of 13 January 2013

Reggie Arosemena Henríquez (born 9 September 1986 in Panama City, Panama) is a football midfielder who most recently played in Panama for Liga Panameña de Futbol team Alianza.

== Club career ==
Arosemena started his career at Sporting San Miguelito before joining giants Tauro. He moved to newly promoted top tier debutants Río Abajo in summer 2012.

In summer 2014 he joined Chorrillo and in January 2015 he left them for Alianza.

In May 2015, Arosemena was hurt in a car accident which killed another person.

== International career ==
Arosemena was part of the Panama U-20 squad that participated in the 2005 FIFA World Youth Cup in Netherlands.

He made his senior debut for Panama in an August 2006 friendly match against Peru and has earned a total of 13 caps, scoring 1 goal. In 2007 Arosemena was part of the Panama that won the 2007 UNCAF Nations Cup in El Salvador.

=== International goals ===
Scores and results list Panama's goal tally first.

#	Date	Venue	Opponent	Score	Result	Competition
1.	13 January 2013	Estadio Rommel Fernández, Panama City, Panama	Guatemala	1–0	2–0	Friendly match

== Honours ==
=== Club ===
- Liga Panameña de Fútbol (1): 2007 (A)
