= Kevin Melgar =

Panamanian footballer (born 1992)

Personal information
- Full name: Kevin Rolando Melgar Cardenas
- Date of birth: 19 November 1992 (age 33)
- Place of birth: Capira, Panama
- Height: 1.83 m (6 ft 0 in)
- Position: Goalkeeper

Team information
- Current team: Alianza
- Number: 30

Senior career*
Years	Team	Apps	(Gls)
2009–2014	Alianza	67	(0)
2014–2015	Tauro	32	(0)
2015–2016	Atletico Chiriqui	12	(0)
2016–2017	Santa Gema	35	(0)
2017–2018	Independiente Chorrera	44	(0)
2018–2019	San Francisco	31	(0)
2020	Costa del Este	7	(0)
2021–	Alianza	117	(0)

International career^{‡}
2011–	Panama	3	(0)
- * Club domestic league appearances and goals as of 14:52, 29 December 2011 (UTC) ‡ National team caps and goals as of 14:52, 29 December 2011 (UTC)

Kevin Rolando Melgar Cardenas (born 19 November 1992) is a Panamanian footballer who plays for Alianza as a goalkeeper.

== Club career ==
He started his career at Alianza and in June 2014 joined Tauro, signing a contract that will keep him 4 seasons with the club.

== International career ==
Melgar made his debut for Panama in a January 2011 UNCAF Nations Cup match against El Salvador and has, as of 10 June 2015, earned a total of 3 caps, scoring no goals.

He latest start for Panama was 10 January 2013, in which was a shutout for him. Panama beat Guatemala that game 3-0, in Panama.
