= Rubén Guevara (Panamanian footballer) =

Panamanian footballer (born 1964)

Personal information
- Full name: Rubén Elías Guevara
- Date of birth: January 27, 1964 (age 62)
- Place of birth: Panama City, Panama
- Position: Attacking midfielder

Team information
- Current team: Río Abajo (manager)

Youth career
- Plaza Amador

Senior career*
Years	Team	Apps	(Gls)
- Unión San Miguelito
1988–1988	Cojutepeque		
1989–1993	Tauro		
1993–1994	León de Huánuco		
1994–1998	Tauro		
1999–2001	San Francisco		

International career^{‡}
1984–1996	Panama	20	(2)

Managerial career
- 2006: Tauro
- 2007: San Francisco
- 2008: Alianza
- 2009: San Francisco
- 2010–2011: Plaza Amador
- 2011–2013: Río Abajo
- 2013–2014: Millenium UP
- 2014–: Río Abajo
- * Club domestic league appearances and goals as of 7 November 2015 ‡ National team caps and goals as of 7 November 2015

Rubén Elías Guevara (born 27 January 1964) is a Panamanian retired football midfielder.

== Club career ==
Nicknamed Tátara, Guevara started his career at Plaza Amador, but made his senior debut for Unión San Miguelito. He then played abroad for Salvadoran side Cojutepeque, alongside compatriots René Mendieta, José Alfredo Poyatos and Percival Piggott and had a lengthy spell with Tauro. He also played in Peru for León de Huánuco.

He finished his career with San Francisco in 2001.

== International career ==
Guevara made his debut for Panama in 1984 and has earned over 20 caps, scoring at least 2 goals. He represented his country in 11 FIFA World Cup qualification matches and played at the 1991 UNCAF Nations Cup.

His final international was a December 1996 FIFA World Cup qualification match against Cuba.

=== International goals ===
Scores and results list Panama's goal tally first.

#	Date	Venue	Opponent	Score	Result	Competition
1	2 June 1996	National Stadium, Belize City, Belize	Belize	1–1	2–1	1998 FIFA World Cup qualification
1	15 December 1996	Estadio Rommel Fernández, Panama City, Panama	Cuba	2–0	3–1	1998 FIFA World Cup qualification

== Managerial career ==
He started his senior coaching career when he was named caretaker at Tauro in October 2006. In March 2007, Tátara was named manager of San Francisco and again in March 2009, after spending time in the Alianza hot seat.

Guevara was appointed manager of Plaza Amador in summer 2010. He took charge at Río Abajo in 2011 and returned at the helm in summer 2014, after a season at fellow second division side Millenium UP.
