= Ricardo Jiménez =

Ricardo Jiménez may refer to:

- Ricardo Jiménez Oreamuno (1859-1945), former President of Costa Rica
- Ricardo Jiménez (FALN) (born 1956), Puerto Rican nationalist and gay rights activist
- Ricardo Jiménez (footballer, born 1983), Mexican football midfielder
- Ricardo Jiménez (footballer, born 1984), Mexican football assistant manager and former centre-back
