= Eybir Bonaga =

Panamanian football attacking midfielder (born 1986)

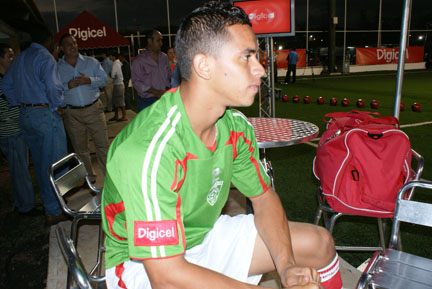

Personal information
- Full name: Eybir Olmedo Bonaga Cerrud
- Date of birth: 19 May 1986 (age 40)
- Place of birth: Chiriquí, Panama
- Height: 1.81 m (5 ft 11 in)
- Position: Attacking midfielder

Team information
- Current team: Santa Gema

Youth career
- 2005: Atlético Chiriquí

Senior career*
Years	Team	Apps	(Gls)
2006–2010	Atlético Chiriquí	114	(24)
2011–2017	San Francisco	135	(9)
2012	→ Boyacá Chicó (loan)	2	(0)
2017	Atlético Nacional		
2018–	Santa Gema	23	(2)

International career^{‡}
2009–	Panama	23	(1)
- * Club domestic league appearances and goals as of 4 October 2018 ‡ National team caps and goals as of 1 May 2015

Eybir Olmedo Bonaga Cerrud (born 19 May 1986) is a Panamanian football attacking midfielder, who currently plays for Santa Gema.

== Club career ==
Bonaga came through the youth ranks at Atlético Chiriquí and moved to San Francisco in December 2010. In January 2012 he had a trial in Slovakia with Corgoň Liga side Ružomberok, but a move did not work out and he joined Colombian side Boyacá Chicó on loan instead.

== International career ==
Bonaga made his debut for Panama in the UNCAF Nations Cup 2009 semi-finals entering as a last minute substitute against Honduras on 30 January 2009 and has, as of 1 May 2015, earned a total of 23 caps, scoring 1 goal. He represented his country in 2 FIFA World Cup qualification matches and played at the 2011 and 2013 CONCACAF Gold Cups. On 10 January 2013 he scored against Guatemala in a friendly in the 67th minute.

=== International goals ===
Scores and results list Panama's goal tally first.

#	Date	Venue	Opponent	Score	Result	Competition
1	10 January 2013	Estadio Rommel Fernández, Panama City, Panama	Guatemala	1–0	3–0	Friendly match

== Honors ==
Panama

- UNCAF Nations Cup: 2009
- CONCACAF Gold Cup runner-up: 2013
