= Daniel Blanco =

Daniel Blanco may refer to:

- Daniel Blanco (Argentine footballer) (born 1978), Argentine football manager and former defender
- Daniel Blanco (Venezuelan footballer) (born 1990), Venezuelan football manager and former midfielder
- Daniel Blanco Acevedo (1879–1971), Uruguayan lawyer and political figure
