= José Alfredo Poyatos =

Panamanian footballer (born 1964)

Personal information
- Full name: José Alfredo Poyatos López
- Date of birth: November 27, 1964 (age 61)
- Place of birth: Panama City, Panama
- Position: Defender

Senior career*
Years	Team	Apps	(Gls)
- Chorrillo
- Tauro
1988–1989	Cojutepeque		
- Plaza Amador
1991–1993	Cojutepeque		

International career^{‡}
1986–1997	Panama		

Managerial career
- 2000: Tauro
- 2004: Tauro
- 2006: Atlético Chiriquí
- 2006: Atlético Veragüense
- 2007: Árabe Unido
- 2009: Chorrillo
- 2010: Panama (assistant)
- 2011–2012: Panama U-20
- 2013: Chorrillo
- 2014: Millenium UP
- 2014–2015: Tauro
- * Club domestic league appearances and goals as of 8 November 2015 ‡ National team caps and goals as of 8 November 2015

José Alfredo Poyatos López (born 27 November 1964) is a Panamanian retired football midfielder.

== Club career ==
Poyatos played for local sides Chorrillo and Tauro and in El Salvador for Cojutepeque where he played alongside compatriots Rubén Guevara, René Mendieta and Percival Piggott.

== International career ==
Poyatos made his debut for Panama in a May 1986 friendly match against the Dominican Republic and has earned over 20 caps. He represented his country in 8 FIFA World Cup qualification matches and played at the 1993 and 1997 UNCAF Nations Cup as well as the 1993 CONCACAF Gold Cup.

His final international was an April 1997 UNCAF Nations Cup match against El Salvador.

== Managerial career ==
Poyatos was named manager of Tauro in 2000 and returned to the club in August 2004. He was Atlético Veragüense boss in 2006 and at Árabe Unido in 2007. He became assistant at the national team in January 2010 and in February 2011 he took charge of the Panama national under-20 football team.

In August 2013 he returned at the helm at Chorrillo and he was appointed by second division Millenium UP in January 2014. In summer 2014 he rejoined Tauro as an assistant to Jorge Dely Valdés, later replacing Valdés only to leave the club in March 2015.
