= Francisco Javier González =

Francisco Javier González may refer to:

- Fran (footballer, born 1969), Spanish retired footballer
- Francisco González (footballer, born 1984), Mexican goalkeeper
- Francisco González (footballer, born 1988), Mexican midfielder
- Fran González (footballer, born 1989), Spanish footballer
