= Football in Panama =

- Country: Panama
- Governing body: Federación Panameña de Fútbol
- National team: Men's national team
- First played: 1862

National competitions
- Liga Panameña de Fútbol

International competitions
- CONCACAF Champions Cup; CONCACAF Central American Cup; FIFA Club World Cup; CONCACAF Gold Cup (National Team); CONCACAF Nations League (National Team); FIFA World Cup (National Team); CONCACAF Women's Championship (National Team); CONCACAF W Gold Cup (National Team); FIFA Women's World Cup (National Team)

Football in Panama is run by the Federación Panameña de Fútbol. The association administers the national football team, as well as the LPF. Football is the second most popular sport in Panama, after baseball. Approximately 60% of the people in Panama are interested in football. Panama qualified for the 2018 FIFA World Cup.

== Domestic football ==
In 1988, professional football was established in Panama. Gary Stempel is considered an influential figure in improving Panama football.

In 2017, a separate women's league, the Liga de Fútbol Femenino, was established, with the aim to improve women's football in the country.

== League system ==
Level	League(s)/Division(s)
1	Liga Panameña de Fútbol; 12 clubs
2	Liga Nacional de Ascenso; 20 clubs
3	Copa Rommel Fernández; 19 clubs divided in 3 series, one of 8 clubs, one of 6 clubs and one of 5 clubs
4	Panamanian Regional Leagues; 10 leagues

== National team ==
In the 2010s, the Panama men's national team experienced its greatest success, finishing as runners-up in the 2013 CONCACAF Gold Cup and qualifying for the 2018 FIFA World Cup.

Meanwhile, the Panama women's national team reached the qualifying play-offs for the FIFA Women's World Cup for the first time in 2019, although their dream was cut short after losing to Argentina. Panama would then repeat the feat by reaching the play-offs for the 2023 FIFA Women's World Cup, again with the aim to qualify for their first Women's World Cup. They successfully achieved World Cup qualification for the first time following a win against Paraguay.

== Stadiums in Panama ==
The Estadio Rommel Fernández, the national football stadium of Panama, is the largest stadium in the country.

Stadium	Main use	Capacity	Tenants	Image
Estadio Rommel Fernández	Association football	32,000	Panama national football team, Tauro FC	
Estadio Nacional de Panamá	Baseball	27,000	Panama national baseball team	

== Attendances ==
The average attendance in the 2024 Clausura was 486. Average attendances of Panamese top-flight football league clubs in the 2024 Clausura:

#	Football club	Home games	Average attendance
1	Tauro FC	8	1,447
2	CD Plaza Amador	8	615
3	Independiente de La Chorrera	8	595
4	San Francisco FC	8	589
5	Sporting San Miguelito	8	532
6	CD Universitario	8	443
7	UMECIT FC	8	403
8	CD Árabe Unido	8	345
9	ACSD Alianza FC	8	288
10	CD del Este	8	234
11	Veraguas United FC	8	186
12	Herrera FC	8	159

== See also ==
- Lists of stadiums
