= Boris Alfaro =

Panamanian footballer (born 1988)

Personal information
- Full name: Boris Xavier Alfaro Chong
- Date of birth: 29 October 1988 (age 38)
- Place of birth: La Chorrera, Panama
- Height: 1.85 m (6 ft 1 in)
- Position: Striker

Team information
- Current team: Costa del Este

Youth career
- 2006–2007: San Francisco

Senior career*
Years	Team	Apps	(Gls)
2008–2011	San Francisco	50	(19)
2011–2012	Universitario de Sucre	34	(12)
2012–2013	Sheriff Tiraspol	2	(0)
2013–2014	San Francisco	31	(6)
2014	The Strongest	9	(4)
2014–2015	Zamora	6	(0)
2015	USMP	4	(0)
2015–2016	San Francisco	12	(1)
2016	Sporting San Miguelito	7	(2)
2016–2017	San José	5	(0)
2017–2018	Sporting San Miguelito	3	(0)
2018–	Costa del Este	18	(2)

International career
2009	Panama	1	(0)
- * Club domestic league appearances and goals as of 15 May 2020

Boris Xavier Alfaro Chong (born 29 October 1988) is a Panamanian international footballer who plays as a striker for Panamanian club Costa del Este.

== Club career ==
Alfaro started his career at San Francisco and moved abroad to play in Bolivia with Universitario de Sucre and The Strongest as well as in Moldova for FC Sheriff Tiraspol. In summer 2014, he joined Venezuelan club Zamora and moved to Peruvian side USMP in January 2015.

He returned to San Francisco in summer 2015.

== International career ==
Alfaro made his debut for Panama in a March 2009 friendly match against Trinidad and Tobago, his sole international to date.

== Personal life ==
His maternal grandfather, whose last name is Chong, is Chinese.

== Honors ==
Club

- ANAPROF (2): 2008 (A) 2009 (A)
