= Daniel Duarte (Mexican footballer) =

Mexican footballer (born 1985)

Daniel Duarte Romero (born 24 May 1985) is a Mexican former professional footballer who played as a defender. In 2017 he achieved promotion to Categoría Primera A with Colombian club Boyacá Chicó, along with two other Mexicans players and a Mexican member of the coaching staff.
