= Alejandro Yearwood =

Panamanian footballer (born 1996)

Personal information
- Full name: Alejandro Alonso Yearwood Francis
- Date of birth: 29 April 1996 (age 30)
- Place of birth: Colón, Panama
- Height: 1.68 m (5 ft 6 in)
- Position: Left-back

Team information
- Current team: Árabe Unido
- Number: 4

Senior career*
Years	Team	Apps	(Gls)
2016	Árabe Unido	1	(0)
2016–2018	San Miguelito	31	(1)
2018–	Árabe Unido	62	(0)

International career^{‡}
2020–	Panama	5	(0)
- * Club domestic league appearances and goals as of 15:01, 6 June 2022 (UTC) ‡ National team caps and goals as of 16 November 2020

Alejandro Alonso Yearwood Francis (born 29 April 1996) is a Panamanian professional footballer who plays as a left-back for Liga Panameña club Árabe Unido and the Panama national team.

== International career ==
Yearwood made his debut for the Panama national team in a 0–0 friendly tie with Nicaragua on 26 February 2020.
