= Pércival Piggott =

Panamanian footballer (born 1966)

Personal information
- Full name: Pércival Antonio Piggott Cumming
- Date of birth: November 23, 1966 (age 59)
- Place of birth: Panama City, Panama
- Position: Winger

Senior career*
Years	Team	Apps	(Gls)
1988–1992	Cojutepeque		
1992–1994	Tauro		
1994–1995	Luis Ángel Firpo		
1995–1998	Victoria		(17)
1998–2001	Herediano		
2000	→ San Francisco (loan)		
2001	Luis Ángel Firpo		
2001–2004	Liberia		
2005–2007	Tauro		

International career^{‡}
1987–2000	Panama	43	(2)

Managerial career
- 2010: Sporting San Miguelito
- 2012–2013: Panama U-17 (assistant)
- * Club domestic league appearances and goals as of 18 June 2007 ‡ National team caps and goals as of 11 July 2015

Pércival Antonio Piggott Cumming (born 23 November 1966 in Panama City, Panama) is a Panamanian former footballer who played professionally for clubs in Panama, El Salvador, Honduras and Costa Rica.

== Club career ==
Piggott scored a goal but still was on the losing side in the 1989/89 Salvadoran league final with Cojutepeque, when they were beaten on penalties by Luis Ángel Firpo after the game ended 2-2 after extra time. He also played for Firpo twice, the second spell started in March 2001 when arriving from Panamanian club San Francisco. He played in Costa Rica for Herediano and in Honduras for Victoria and he returned to Costa Rica in August 2001 when he joined Municipal Liberia. He retired in 2007.

== International career ==
Piggott made his debut for Panama in a May 1987 Olympic Games qualification match against El Salvador and has earned a total of 43 caps, scoring 2 goals. He represented his country in 15 FIFA World Cup qualification matches and played at the 1993 CONCACAF Gold Cup.

His final international was a November 2000 FIFA World Cup qualification match against Trinidad and Tobago.

=== International goals ===
Scores and results list Panama's goal tally first.

#	Date	Venue	Opponent	Score	Result	Competition
1	14 July 1993	Cotton Bowl, Dallas, United States	United States	1–0	1–2	1993 CONCACAF Gold Cup
2	29 February 2000	Estadio Flor Blanca, San Salvador, El Salvador	El Salvador	1–2	1–3	Friendly match

== Managerial career ==
After retiring as a player, Piggott worked as a pundit for Panamanian TV. In March 2010, Piggott was appointed manager of Sporting San Miguelito.

== Personal life ==
His son Romario Piggott joined his dad's former club Tauro from Chepo ahead of the 2015 Clausura.
