= Ricardo Jiménez (footballer, born 1983) =

Mexican footballer (born 1983)

Ricardo Jiménez Molina (born February 26, 1983) is a Mexican former professional footballer who played as a defender. Throughout his career, he was associated with several clubs in Mexico's top divisions. He began with Puebla FC (2004–2007), then moved to Club León (2008–2010), and had stints with Cruz Azul Hidalgo (2010), Correcaminos UAT (2010–2011, 2012–2013), Ballenas Galeana (2013), Zacatepec Siglo XXI (2014–2015), and Cimarrones de Sonora (2015). In 2014 he had stint in Panama with Chorrillo F.C.
