= Hugo Rodríguez (footballer, born 1985) =

Mexican footballer

Hugo Emiliano Rodríguez Chávez (born February 4, 1985, in Mexico City) is a former Mexican professional footballer who last played for Tapachula of Ascenso MX.
