= Patrick (sportswear company) =

Sportswear company

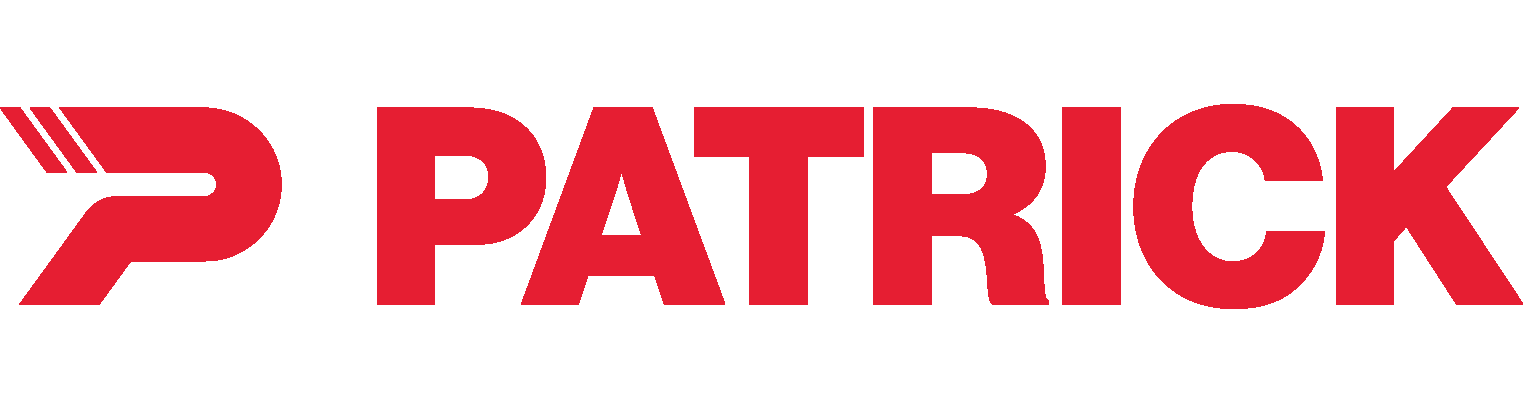
- Type: Sportswear
- Industry: Textile, footwear
- Founded: 1892
- Founder: Eugene Bénéteau // Patrice Beneteau
- Headquarters: Oudenaarde, Belgium
- Area served: Europe
- Products: Sports shoes and socks
- Subsidiaries: Cortina Group
- Website: patrick.eu

Patrick is a sportswear company headquartered in Oudenaarde, East Flanders, Belgium.

== History ==
1892 - 1894: Start and official registration of the shoe factory of Eugene Bénéteau

Eugene Bénéteau was a 19th-century shoemaker in the little town Pouzauges in the French Vendée. In 1892, he started his own shoe and leather factory, the predecessor to what would later become Patrick. In 1894, the registration of his factory became official.

1929: Patrice Bénéteau follows in the footsteps of his father Eugene

In the 1920s, Eugene’s son Patrice took over the factory and started making shoes for the local soccer team. He did such a fine job that the word spread fast and other teams came knocking at his door. Not much later, Patrice also started producing shoes and apparel for basketball, running, cricket, athletics, cycling and leisure. In 1929, he was one of the first to start sponsoring famous sportspeople – a strategy that would become the foundation for the brand’s exceptional growth. Patrice changes the name of the factory to “Manufacture de chaussures sports Patrice Bénéteau”.

1932: The birth of the two stripes

In the 1930s, Patrick introduced its famous two and three stripes on the shoes to technically strengthen them in the front and at the back. Patrick was one of the pioneers to use this widely copied technique. Later, the striping became mainly a matter of design, but the two Patrick stripes were there to stay as part of Patrick’s brand identity.

1945: “Patrice” becomes “Patrick”

In 1945, Patrice changed the name of his sports brand to Patrick. The new name was receptive to all languages and allowed the brand to be promoted and exported worldwide.

1950: Invention of the revolutionary “plastfix” sole

Patrick’s exclusive “plastfix” sole was considered revolutionary for the time, due to its lightness and resistance. Patrick’s “monobloc” mounting system made the footwear completely waterproof and shape retaining.

1951: Roger Piantoni (football)

In the 1950s, Patrick sponsored Roger Piantoni, a former French footballer that played for FC Nancy, Stade de Reims and OGC Nice. With Stade de Reims, he became champion of France in 1958, 1960 and 1962. Piantoni also became a top scorer in the “Ligue 1” two times (1951, 1961).

1960: Robert Poulain (rugby)

The national rugby monitor for Patrick France was Robert Poulain, who tested the functionality and durability of Patrick’s rugby collection. For years, he was the reference for quality footwear in rugby. He helped to develop a line of Poulain junior and senior footwear and elevated the game through research and progressive adjustments to these shoes.

1961: Raymond Poulidor and Jaques Anquetil (cycling)

During the sixties, Patrick had two cyclists on its team: Jacques Anquetil and Raymond Poulidor. Anquetil was also known as “Monsieur Chrono”, a nickname he achieved by winning a lot of time trials. His name became even more legendary after winning the Tour de France 5 times. Poulidor was a popular sportsman among the French people who named him “Pou Pou”. As an eternal second, he always came a little short to catch the first prize. In 1961, he became a French cycling champion.

1976: Flemming Delfs (badminton)

Flemming Delfs is especially noteworthy for winning the men's singles at the first IBF World Championship held in Malmö (Sweden) in 1977. Delfs won three consecutive European men's singles titles in 1976, 1978 and 1980. He played on all four Danish Thomas Cup (men's international) teams between 1972 and 1982, two of which reached the championship rounds.

1978: Bernard Hinault (cycling)

Following Anquetil’s footsteps, Patrick’s Bernard Hinault won the Tour de France five times in ’78, ’79, ’81, ’82 and ’85. This resulted in his own signature model.

1979: Kevin Keegan (football)

Kevin Keegan was one of the most remarkable players on the Patrick football team. Starting his career in 1968, he starred in the English First Division, where he ended as a coach in September 2008. He played in the England national team, where he managed to score 21 goals in 63 international matches. Pelé chose him to be part of the 100 best footballers in the world.

1983: Michel Platini (football)

Michel Platini is a French former football player, manager and administrator. Nicknamed “Le Roi” (the king) for his ability and leadership, he is regarded as one of the greatest footballers of all time. Platini won the Ballon d'Or three times, in 1983, 1984 and 1985, and ended sixth in the FIFA Player of the Century vote. In recognition of his achievements, he was named Chevalier of the Legion of Honour in 1985 and became Officier in 1988.

1984: Jahangir Khan (squash)

In squash, there was only one true champion in the ‘80s: Jahangir Khan. He won the world championship no less than eight times.

1986: Brian and Michael Laudrup (football)

During his playing career, Michael Laudrup won league titles with Ajax, Barcelona, Real Madrid and Juventus, playing as an attacking midfielder. As a world-class playmaker, he was a member of Johan Cruyff's "dream team" at Barcelona. There, he won nine trophies, including four successive La Liga titles from 1991 to 1994 and the European Cup in 1992. Laudrup moved to archrivals Real Madrid in 1994, with whom he won his fifth La Liga title in a row.

1987: Jean-Pierre Papin (football)

Jean-Pierre Papin achieved his greatest success while playing for Olympique Marseille between 1986 and 1992. He later played for A.C. Milan, FC Bayern Munich, Bordeaux, Guingamp, JS Saint-Pierroise and US Cap-Ferret. Papin also played for the France national team 54 times. After a short time as a manager of French clubs, he started playing in the local amateur club AS Facture-Biganos Boïen in 2009 at the age of 45.

2002: JJB and Dave Whelan (football and rugby)

In 2002, Dave Whelan purchased a stake in Patrick that meant JJB Sports used the Patrick brand for its own-brand menswear and sports accessories across their UK and Ireland stores. Patrick were most notably the kit manufacturer during this time for Wigan Athletic and Wigan Warriors, both owned by Whelan.

2008: Patrick becomes a part of Cortina

In 2008, Patrick became a part of the family-owned company Cortina, one of the fastest-growing global fashion footwear and apparel companies in today’s industry. A heritage collection was launched that reproduced several models out of Patrick’s rich history in a limited edition.

2009: Patrick becomes the official partner of the referees’ associations in Belgium

Frank De Bleeckere, a famous Belgian football referee, collaborated with Patrick in 2009 to promote a shoe especially for referees. Since then, Patrick is the official supplier of the referees’ associations in Belgium and many other leagues.

== Products ==
Patrick manufactures sports shoes (Sneakers), apparel and teamwear.

== Sponsorships ==
Teams that wear (or have worn) uniforms by Patrick includes:

=== Football ===
==== Africa ====
- (Algeria) USM El Harrach

==== Europe ====
- (Belgium) Oudenaarde
- (Belgium) White Star Woluwe
- (Belgium) Zulte Waregem
- (France) SC Toulon
- (Germany) Rot-Weiß Oberhausen.
- (Germany) Hallescher FC.
- (Germany) Bremer SV
- (Germany) FC Gütersloh.
- (Germany) FC Eddersheim.

==== Oceania ====
- (French Polynesia) Excelsior
- (French Polynesia) Mataiea

==== Referees ====
Patrick is also the official referee kits supplier for the leagues:

- (Belgium) Belgian First Division A
  - Belgian First Division B
  - Belgian National Division 1
  - Belgian Division 2 VFV
  - Belgian Division 2 ACFF
  - Belgian Division 3 VFV
  - Belgian Division 3 ACFF

==== Former club teams ====
- (England) Bolton Wanderers
- (England) Cambridge United
- (England) Derby County
- (England) Hull City
- (England) Peterborough United
- (England) Stockport County
- (England) Sunderland
- (England) Southampton
- (England) Plymouth Argyle
- (England) West Bromwich Albion
- (England) Wigan Athletic
- (England) Gateshead F.C.
- (England) Ossett United
- (France) Clermont
- (France) EA Guingamp
- (France) US Boulogne
- (France) Mulhouse
- (Netherlands) Sparta Rotterdam
- (Netherlands) NEC Nijmegen
- (Belgium) Royal Excel Mouscron
- (Belgium) Royal Knokke F.C.
- (Poland) Chrobry Głogów
- (Poland) Zagłębie Sosnowiec
- (Wales) Newport County
- (Wales) Wrexham
- (Panama) Tauro
- (Honduras) Victoria
- (Costa Rica) Herediano
- (Costa Rica) Cartaginés

==== Former national teams ====
- Bosnia and Herzegovina (1996–1999)
- Northern Ireland (2000–2003)
- Panama (1992–1996)

=== Volleyball ===
==== Clubs teams ====
- (Belgium) Knack Roeselare

=== Rugby League ===
==== Club teams ====
(England) Leigh Leopards
