= Daniel Blanco (Venezuelan footballer) =

Venezuelan football manager (born 1990)

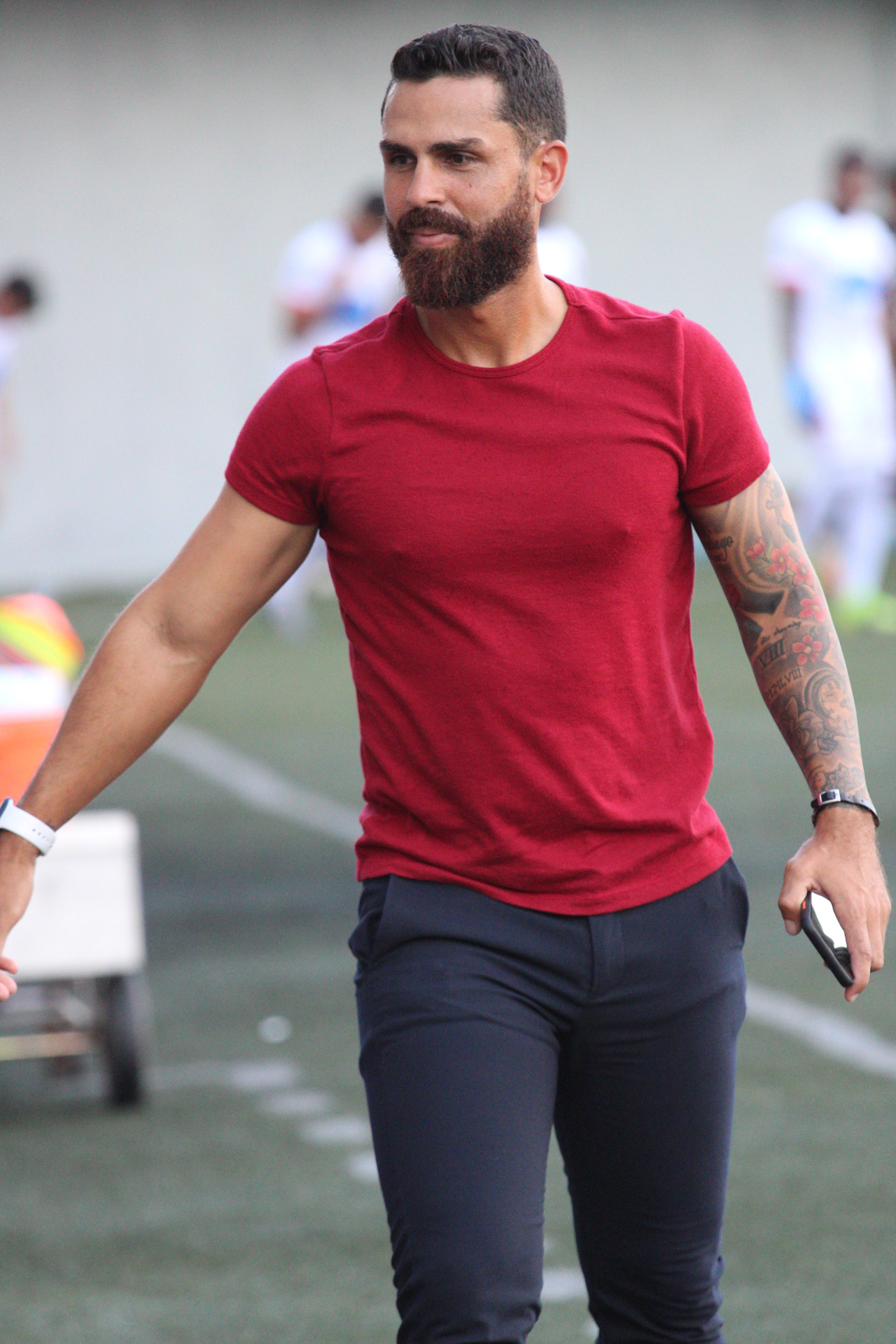
- Blanco in 2021

Personal information
- Full name: Daniel Alejandro Blanco Aparicio
- Date of birth: 25 May 1990 (age 36)
- Place of birth: Caracas, Venezuela
- Height: 1.73 m (5 ft 8 in)
- Position: Midfielder

Youth career
- Gulima
- Caracas

Senior career*
Years	Team	Apps	(Gls)
2009–2010	Caracas B		
2009–2012	Caracas	2	(0)
2010–2011	→ Caroní (loan)	7	(0)
2011–2012	→ Atlético Venezuela (loan)		
2012–2015	Metropolitanos		
2015	Barrio México		
2016	Plaza Amador	8	(0)
2017	San Miguelito	7	(0)
2017–2018	Plaza Amador		
2018–2020	Costa del Este		

International career
2005	Venezuela U15		
2007	Venezuela U17		

Managerial career
- 2021–2023: Potros del Este
- 2024: Monagas
- * Club domestic league appearances and goals

Daniel Alejandro Blanco Aparicio (born 25 May 1990) is a Venezuelan football manager and former player who played as a midfielder.

== Playing career ==
Born in Caracas, Blanco was a Caracas FC youth graduate. After appearing with the reserves, he made his first team debut in 2009, and subsequently served loan stints at Primera División newcomers Caroní and Atlético Venezuela.

In 2012, Blanco signed for Metropolitanos in Segunda División, and helped in their first-ever promotion to the top tier in 2014. In August 2015, he moved abroad and joined Costa Rican side Barrio México.

On 1 March 2016, Blanco agreed to a contract with Plaza Amador in Panama. He moved to fellow league team San Miguelito ahead of the 2017 season, but returned to Plaza Amador in July of that year.

On 14 August 2018, Blanco joined Costa del Este still in the Panamanian top tier. He won the 2018–19 Copa Panamá with the club before retiring in January 2020, aged 29.

== Managerial career ==
Shortly after retiring, Blanco joined the technical staff of his last club Costa del Este. On 28 May 2021, he was named their new manager. He continued to work with the club after they changed name to Potros del Este in 2022, only leaving his post in May 2023.

In June 2023, Blanco joined Thomas Christiansen's staff at the Panama national team, as a video analyst. He left the post on 20 October, and returned to managerial duties after being appointed in charge of Monagas back in his home country.

On 26 March 2024, Blanco was sacked from Monagas after just nine matches.

== Honours ==
=== Player ===
Costa del Este

- Copa Panamá: 2018–19
