= Francisco González (footballer, born 1984) =

Mexican footballer

Personal information
- Full name: Francisco Javier González Medina
- Date of birth: January 31, 1984 (age 42)
- Place of birth: Zacatecas, Zacatecas, Mexico
- Height: 1.86 m (6 ft 1 in)
- Position: Goalkeeper

Senior career*
Years	Team	Apps	(Gls)
2006–2010	Santos Laguna	5	(0)
2009–2010	→ Club León (loan)	0	(0)
- * Club domestic league appearances and goals as of April 29, 2008

Francisco Javier González Medina (Note: In this Spanish name, the first or paternal surname is González and the second or maternal family name is Medina.) (born 31 January 1984, in Zacatecas), known as Francisco González, is a former Mexican professional footballer, who played as goalkeeper for Santos Laguna and Club León.
