= Cancha de Entrenamiento Luis Tapia =

Football stadium in Panama

Luis Ernesto Cascarita Tapia
- El Cascarita "The Cascarita"; Mini Rommel "Mini Rommel"
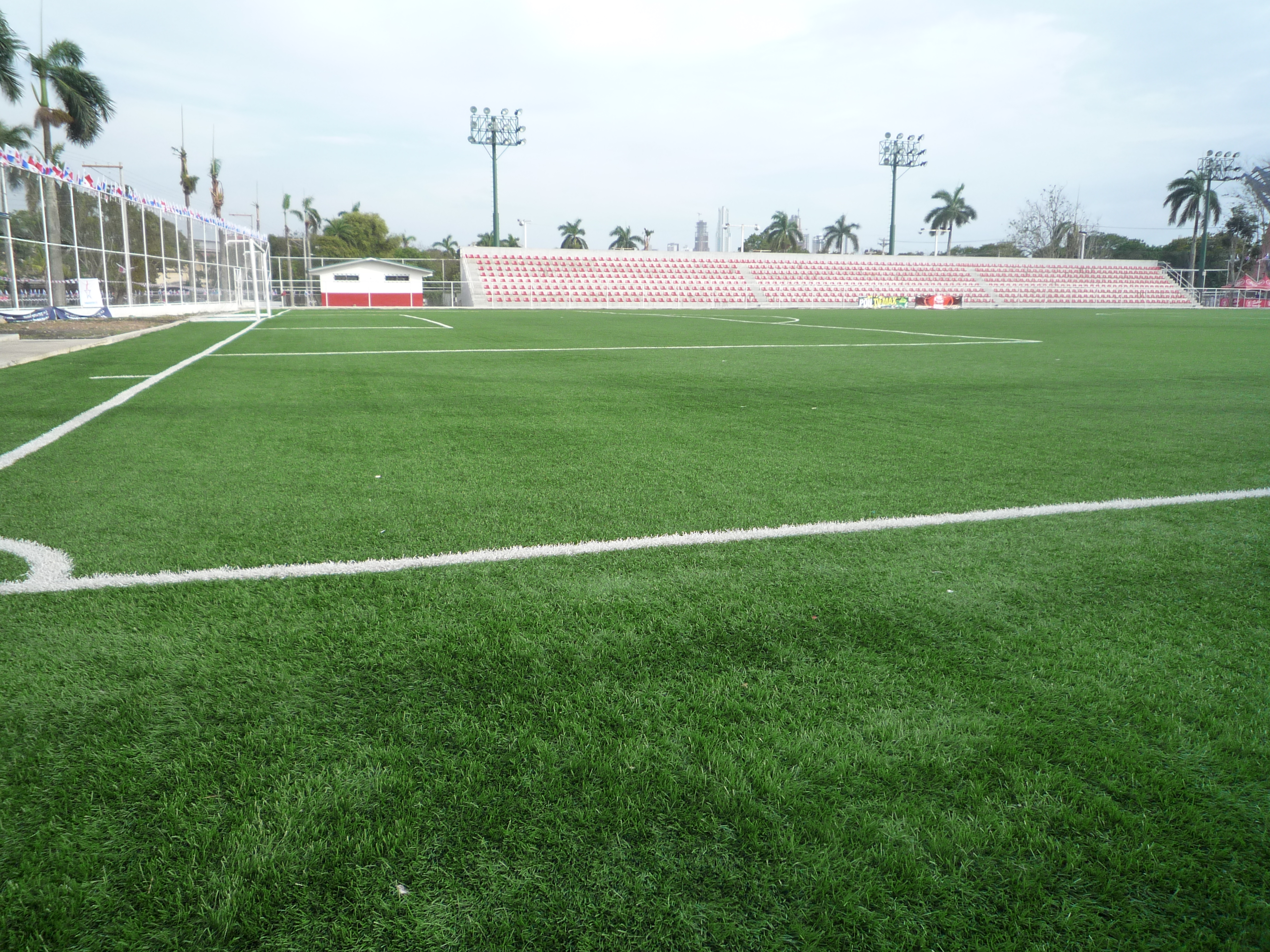
- Artificial turf
- Interactive map of Luis Ernesto Cascarita Tapia
- Full name: Luis Ernesto Cascarita Tapia
- Former names: Mini-Rommel; Rommelin
- Location: Panama City, Panama
- Coordinates: 9°2′1.7412″N 79°28′14.0298″W
- Owner: INDE
- Operator: Pandeportes
- Capacity: 900
- Surface: Artificial Turf
- Field size: -

Construction
- Opened: January 22, 2009
- Renovated: 2012
- Cost: US$962,288

Tenants
- Tauro FC; Alianza FC; Chepo F.C. Liga Nacional de Ascenso

The Luis Ernesto "Cascarita" Tapia Court, or Mini Rommel as it was known, is an alternative court to Estadio Rommel Fernandez which provides training to the Panama national football team, but is also used by clubs of Panamanian Football League. It is named after the Panamanian footballer, famous in the 1960s and 1970s, called the "Central-American Pele". and is located in the Sports Complex of Ciudad Deportiva Irving Saladino.

== Opening ==
It was officially inaugurated on January 22, 2009, by the former president Martin Torrijos, Siglo XXI and Chorrillo FC youth teams played the first match. In September 2010 was given the name of Luis Ernesto Tapia, in tribute to footballer of same name.

== Name ==
Five names were proposed for the stadium, and Luis Ernesto Tapia, was selected by Pandeportes (Government Sports Authority), in honor of that great footballer.

== Renovations ==
In January 2012, a roof was installed to the main section costing $302,259.

== Other Usage ==
The field is also used by men and women Flag football leagues.
