= C.D. Árabe Unido =

Association football club in Panama

Árabe Unido
- Full name: Club Deportivo Árabe Unido
- Nicknames: El Expreso Azul (The Blue Express); Los Árabes (The Arabs); DAU; La Furia colonense (The Fury from Colón); El Más Laureado
- Founded: 28 April 1994; 31 years ago
- Ground: Estadio Armando Dely Valdés; Colón, Panama
- Capacity: 4,000
- Chairman: Pedro Gordon
- Manager: Sergio Guzmán
- League: Liga Panameña de Fútbol
- 2022 (C): 3rd
Home colours	Away colours

Club Deportivo Árabe Unido is a professional football club located in Colón, Panama that plays in Liga Panameña de Fútbol, the top tier of the Panamanian football pyramid. The club plays its games in Estadio Armando Dely Valdés.

Its name, Árabe Unido, means "Arab United" in English, is emphasised from its original Arab root of the club.

== History ==
The club has been one of the most successful in Panama in recent years, winning 15 titles (more than any other team since 1998) and finishing second five times.

It was founded in 1990 by Arab immigrants to Panama, under the name of Club Atlético Argentina, and experienced immediate success. After climbing the Panamanian league system, in 1994 they took advantage of a split in Panama's governing body to move into the top division. What happened was that a rival league (LINFUNA) formed in opposition to the older, existing top flight (ANAPROF). Árabe Unido was almost immediately successful in LINFUNA, winning both championships that the splinter league held in 1994 and 1995.

Their success continued once they re-entered ANAPROF; at that time, Tauro FC was the dominant team in the league and would win three championships in four years between 1996 and 2000. The only club to break that string was Árabe Unido, which won the 1998–99 title by beating Tauro 3–0 in the playoff final.

After the league switched to the Aprtura/Clausura format in the 2001 season, Los Arabes really began winning titles. The original plan was for the winners of the Apertura to meet the Clausura in a "Grand Final" that would determine the year's champion. Árabe rendered this unnecessary by winning both tournaments. They claimed a third straight championship in Apertura 2002, although they did lose that year's grand final to Plaza Amador.

El Expreso Azul (as fans also called Árabe Unido) would go on to add further honors by sweeping the 2003 season, then winning back to back titles in Clausura 2008 and Apertura 2009. They have also won titles in Clausura 2010, Apertura 2012, Clausura 2015, Apertura 2015, and most recently Apertura 2016.l

== Honours ==
=== National titles ===
- Liga Panameña de Fútbol: (13)
  - 1998–99, 2001 Apertura, 2001 Clausura, 2002 Apertura, 2004 Apertura, 2004 Clausura, 2008 Clausura, 2009 Apertura, 2010 Clausura, 2012 Apertura, 2015 Clausura, 2015 Apertura, 2016 Apertura
- LINFUNA: 2 (Record)
  - 1994–95, 1995–96

=== International titles ===
- UNCAF Interclub Cup: 0
  - Runners-up (1): 2002
- CONCACAF Champions' Cup: 2 appearance
  - 1996 – Qualifying stage (Central Zone)
  - 2003 – First Round
- CONCACAF League: 2 appearances
  - 2017 – Semifinals
  - 2018 – Semifinals
- CONCACAF Champions League: 5 appearances
  - 2009–10 – Quarterfinal
  - 2010–11 – Group Stage
  - 2013–14 – Quarterfinal
  - 2015–16 – Group Stage
  - 2016–17 – Quarterfinal

== Players ==
=== Current squad ===
As of 10 February 2023. Note: Flags indicate national team as defined under FIFA eligibility rules; some limited exceptions apply. Players may hold more than one non-FIFA nationality.

No.	Pos.	Nation	Player
1	GK	PAN	Joseph Vargas
2	DF	PAN	Jamall Dickens
3	DF	COL	Diego Fori
5	DF	PAN	Francisco Vence
6	MF	PAN	Rubén Baruco
7	FW	PAN	Efraín Bristan
8	FW	PAN	Leonel Tejada
9	FW	PAN	Ángel Sánchez
10	MF	PAN	Jamel González
11	MF	PAN	Armando Cooper
13	DF	PAN	Juan Mosquera
14	MF	PAN	Leonel Triana
15	DF	PAN	Gabriel Brown

No.	Pos.	Nation	Player
16	MF	PAN	César Reyna
18	FW	PAN	Sergio Moreno
19	MF	PAN	Jaime Harrison
20	GK	PAN	Reynaldo Polo
22	MF	PAN	Kevin Meneses
24	MF	PAN	Rafael Emanuel
26	DF	PAN	Félix Góndola
27	FW	PAN	Yamar Reed
29	FW	PAN	Franklin Cordoba
35	DF	PAN	Jajac Cruz
71	MF	PAN	Ariel Arroyo
77	MF	PAN	Víctor Griffith
86	DF	PAN	Omar Llerena

=== Retired numbers ===
21 — (Panama) Amílcar Henríquez, midfielder (2003–08), (2014),(2016–2017) — posthumous honour.

== Historical list of coaches ==
- (Peru) Eliazar Herrera (1998–99)
- (Colombia) Richard Parra (2001–03)
- (Colombia) Jairo Silva (2003–04)
- (Paraguay) Juan Carlos Gómez Cáceres (2004)
- (Spain) Ramón Vecinos (2005–06)
- (Colombia) Wiston Cifuentes (2006)
- (Panama) José Alfredo Poyatos (2007)
- (Colombia) Richard Parra (Aug 2009 – Nov 10)
- (Colombia) Wilman Conde (Dec 2010 – June 11)
- (Costa Rica) Carlos Pérez Porras (June 2011 – Nov 11)
- (Colombia) Jair Palacios (Dec 2011 – Aug 14)
- (Panama) Julio Dely Valdés (August 2014 – Dec 2014)
- (Colombia) Alfonso de Moya (Jan 2015–15)
- (Colombia) Sergio Guzmán (February 2015 – December 2017)
- (Colombia) Carlos Ruiz (January 2018 – September 2018)
- (Colombia) José Ricardo "Chicho" Pérez (September 2018 – June 2019)
- (Colombia) Alejandro Mejía (June 2019 – September 2019)
- (Colombia) Sergio Guzmán (September 2019 – August 2021)
- (Colombia) Sergio Angulo (August 2021–present)
- (Panama) Julio Dely Valdés ( - August 2023)
- (Colombia) Alberto Nino Valencia (August 2023 - March 2024)
- (Venezuela) Francisco Perlo (March 2024 - June 2025)
- (Argentina) Javier Ainstein (June 2025 - September 2025)
- (Colombia) Juan Sergio Guzmán (September 2025 - Present)
