= Club Deportivo Universitario =

Association football club in Panama

- Full name: Club Deportivo Universitario
- Nicknames: La "U"; Universitarios
- Founded: 1974 as Chorrillo FC
- Ground: Estadio Universitario; Penonomé, Panama
- Capacity: 1,000
- Chairman: Manuel E. Arias
- Manager: Jose Anthony Torres
- League: Liga Panameña de Fútbol
Home colours	Away colours

Club Deportivo Universitario (formerly Chorrillo F.C.) is a Panamanian professional football club currently playing in the Liga Panameña de Fútbol, the highest level of football in Panama. It is based in Penonomé, Coclé Province.

== History ==
Chorrillo FC was founded in 1974 to prevent youngsters from becoming involved in criminal activities. They won promotion to the top fight for the first time in 2001 by beating Pan de Azúcar 2–1 in a promotion playoff. This was their second serious attempt at promotion, the first ending in a loss on penalties to Municipal de Colón.

The club won its first title in Apertura 2011, beating Plaza Amador 4–1. In May 2014 they won the 2014 Clausura title. They won another title in Clausura 2014, and later in Apertura 2017, as well as twice finishing runners-up.

In 2018, financial problems forced Chorrillo FC to merge with CD Centenario and Panama City's Universidad Latina, the new name agreed is Club Deportivo Universitario. Parts of the agreement included that the team will be relocated to Penonomé on the Province of Coclé from Panama City´s El Chorrillo neighborhood, a construction of the new stadium that would be completed on late March 2019 and relocate/lease CD Centenario team from Penonomé to Colón Province as New York FC/Centenario.

== Crest ==
The El Chorrillo district was heavily bombard by the United States Army during Operation Just Cause. The club adopted the phoenix emblem to symbolize the district's recovery.

Municipal Chorrillo's old crest

== Honours ==
- Liga Panameña de Fútbol
  - Champions (3): 2011 (A), 2014 (C), 2017 (A)
  - Runners-up (2): 2011 (C), 2009 (A)
- Primera A
  - Champions (1): 2000–01
  - Runners-up (1): 1998

== Players (2024) ==
Note: Flags indicate national team as defined under FIFA eligibility rules; some limited exceptions apply. Players may hold more than one non-FIFA nationality.

No.	Pos.	Nation	Player
1	GK	COL	Esteban Giraldo
2	DF	PAN	Samuel Batchelor
3	DF	PAN	Samuel Batchelor
4	MF	PAN	Luis Dean
6	MF	PAN	Rolando Botello
7	MF	PAN	Ricardo Castillo
8	MF	PAN	Joel Guevara
10	MF	PAN	Luis Canate
11	FW	COL	Juan Vasquez
12	GK	PAN	Ariel De la Cruz
14	MF	PAN	Enrique Machacen
15	MF	PAN	Nicolas Wood
16	DF	PAN	Alejandro Yearwood

No.	Pos.	Nation	Player
17	FW	PAN	Andrick Edwards
19	DF	PAN	Felix General
21	DF	PAN	Osvaldo Valencia
22	FW	PAN	Julian Rodriguez
24	FW	PAN	Randy Rangel
26	DF	PAN	Luis Gonzalez
27	MF	PAN	Eric Moreno
39	FW	PAN	Dilan Herbert
40	MF	PAN	Eduardo Jiménez
43	MF	PAN	Pablo Penalba
50	FW	PAN	Roberto Reina
89	GK	PAN	Joseph Esquina

== Historical list of coaches ==
- (Spain) Carlos García Cantarero (2005–2007)
- (Panama) Carlos Flores (2008)
- (Panama) José Alfredo Poyatos (January–December 2009)
- (Colombia) Félix Quiñones (2009–2010)
- (Uruguay) Miguel Mansilla (2010–2011)
- (Panama) Luis Maughn (June 2011–Aug 13)
- (Panama) José Alfredo Poyatos (August–December 2013)
- (Panama) César "Chino" Morales (2013–2014)
- (Panama) Julio Medina III (2014–2015)
- (Panama) Mike Stump (2015–2018)
- (Colombia) Óscar Upegui (June–September 2018)
- (Panama) Julio Medina III (September–December 2018)
- (Argentina) Gustavo Onaindia (2018–2019)
- (Panama) Donaldo González (March–June 2019)
- (Argentina) Leonardo Pipino (June–October 2019)
- (Colombia) Richard Parra (October–December 2019)
- (Panama) (England) Gary Stempel (2020–2022)
- (Venezuela) Julio Infante (2022–2023)
- (Panama) José Mario Anthony Torres (January–May 2024)
- (Panama) Javier Miller (May 2024)
- (Venezuela) Ángel Sánchez (May 2024–present)
