= Alianza F.C. (Panama) =

Association football club in Panama

Alianza
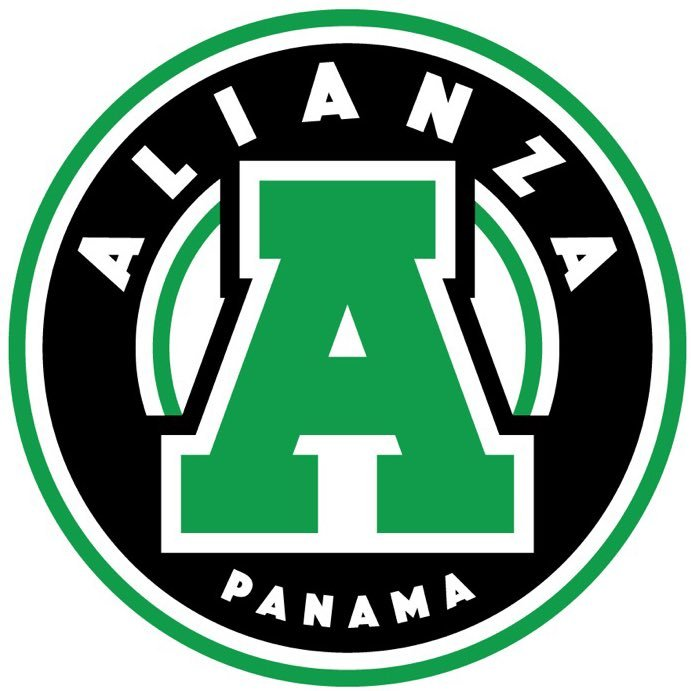
- Full name: Asociación Cívica, Social y Deportiva Alianza Fútbol Club
- Nicknames: Los Pericos; Los Verdolagas
- Founded: 2 March 1963
- Ground: Estadio Javier Cruz; Panama City
- Capacity: 700
- Chairman: Rubén Cárdenas
- Manager: Eduameth Nimbley
- League: Liga Panameña de Fútbol
- 2024 LPF (A): 6th
- Website: alianzafc.net
Home colours	Away colours	Third colours

Alianza F.C. is a professional football club based in Panama City, Panama. Since 1999, it competes in Liga Panameña de Fútbol, the top tier of Panamanian football. The club was founded in 1963, and still owned by the Cardenas family.

== History ==
Alianza F.C. was founded on 2 March 1963 by a group of 12 young players that had represented Panama in the first CONCACAF Youth Championship. That date makes them the second oldest club in modern Panamanian football.

The club was supported by various benefactors such as the local police, Don Justiniano Cardenas, and the Espivak Company during its early decades. In 1980, the club was chosen among other eight clubs to participate in the first professional football league in Panama, which was called the Liga Superior de Fútbol de Panamá.

As of 1989, the club joined to Anaprof's non-amateur football tournaments, which was interrupted by the disunity that arose in the local football environment, and was forced to compete in the so-called Linfuna League. After two seasons, the club returned to the Primera A of ANAPROF, where they won promotion two seasons afterwards after beating Atletico Guadalupe 1–0. In 2003, they enjoyed their best season ever, reaching the Clausura finals before losing 5-1 to Tauro FC.

The club has always placed a strong emphasis on youth teams, competing at the U-12, U-14, U-15, U-16, and U-19 levels.

== Support ==
During the mid-90s, the team was based in Chilibre, Panama City´s northern area, playing home matches at El Camping Resort football field. By the mid-2000s, the team left the area to play matches at different venues causing a lack of identity, low fan support base and heavily criticized by media. By 2012 the team start playing home matches at Luis Cascarita Tapia stadium looking to gain more fan support from the Juan Diaz neighborhood, Panama City´s east side. Since 2018 the team has heavily marketed on the neighborhood to gain new supporters and attracting kids to their youth teams.

== Kits ==
=== Kit suppliers and shirt sponsors ===
Period	Kit manufacturer	Shirt main sponsor	Shirt sub sponsor
2016–2019		Cerveza Balboa; Cemento Interoceanico	Bering Motors
2020-2021		CliniLab; Panamerican Network	None
2021 - 2022		CliniLab	Gaps
2022- Present		ShowTime; CliniLab	None

=== Previous Kits ===
2017-2018 Home Jersey	2017-2018 Away Jersey

== Honours ==
=== Domestic ===
- Liga Panameña de Fútbol and predecessors
  - Champions: (2): Clausura 2003, 2022 Apertura
- Primera A and predecessors
  - Champions (1): 1999

== Players ==
=== Current squad ===
- As of 7 September 2026

Note: Flags indicate national team as defined under FIFA eligibility rules; some limited exceptions apply. Players may hold more than one non-FIFA nationality.

No.	Pos.	Nation	Player
1	GK	VEN	Jean Ambuila
2	DF	PAN	Adolfo Machado
3	DF	PAN	Yeison Ortega
6	MF	PAN	Darío Wright
7	FW	PAN	Heuyín Guardia
8	MF	PAN	Gilberto Rangel
10	MF	PAN	Alcides Díaz
13	MF	PAN	Alvin Mendoza
14	MF	PAN	Omar Valderrama
16	MF	PAN	Ricardo Mitre
17	MF	PAN	John Asprilla

No.	Pos.	Nation	Player
18	DF	PAN	Reyniel Perdomo
19	MF	PAN	Maikell Díaz
20	FW	PAN	Rolando Herrera
22	MF	PAN	Manuel Rodríguez
23	DF	PAN	Rolando Rodriguez
27	FW	PAN	Ansony Frias
28	FW	PAN	John Jairo Alvarado
29	DF	PAN	Alejandro Yearwood
30	GK	PAN	Kevin Melgar
61	GK	PAN	Ronald Robles

=== Out on loan ===
Note: Flags indicate national team as defined under FIFA eligibility rules; some limited exceptions apply. Players may hold more than one non-FIFA nationality.

No. / Pos. / Nation / Player; — / FW / PAN / Reynaldiño Verley (at (Ukraine) Kudrivka until 30 June 2027)	No. / Pos. / Nation / Player

=== Records ===
All-time scorer is César "El Bombo" Medina.

== Historical list of coaches ==
- (Costa Rica) Leroy Foster (Feb 2003 – Oct 2003)
- (Panama) Rubén Cárdenas (Oct 2003–)
- (Costa Rica) Leroy Foster (Jun 2007–)
- (Panama) Rubén Cárdenas (2007)
- (Panama) Rubén "Tátara" Guevara (Jun 2008 – Oct 08)
- (Panama) Rubén Cárdenas
- (Panama) Víctor René Mendieta (Jul 2009 – Oct 09)
- (Costa Rica) Carlos Pérez Porras (Dec 2009 – Feb 11)
- (Costa Rica) Leroy Foster (2010)
- (Panama) Ángelo Luis Evans (Feb 2011 – July 11)
- (Colombia) Elkin Ortiz Castaño (Aug 2011 – May 2012)
- (Panama) Rubén Octavio Cárdenas (June 2012 – Dec 2012)
- (Colombia) Elkin Ortiz Castaño (Dec 2012 – Oct 13)
- (Costa Rica) Carlos Pérez Porras (Oct 2013 – Sep 14)
- (Costa Rica) Leroy Foster (Jun 2014 – Aug 14)
- (Colombia) Juan Pablo Lopera (Sep 2014 – Sep 2015)
- (Panama) Rubén Cárdenas (Sep 2015–2019)
- (Colombia) Alberto Valencia Nino (2019)
- (Panama) Cecilio Garcés (2019– March 2021)
- (Colombia) Jair Palacios (March 2021 - December 2023)
- (Panama) Eduameth Nimbley (January 2024- November 2024)
- (Colombia) Alberto Valencia Nino (December 2024 - February 2025)
- (Colombia) Jair Palacios (February 2025 - Present)
