= Estadio Maracaná (Panama) =

Football stadium in Panama City, Panama

- El Maracaná del Pueblo "The People's Maracana"; El Maracaná de Panamá "The Maracana of Panama"; El Nuevo Maracaná "The New Maracana"
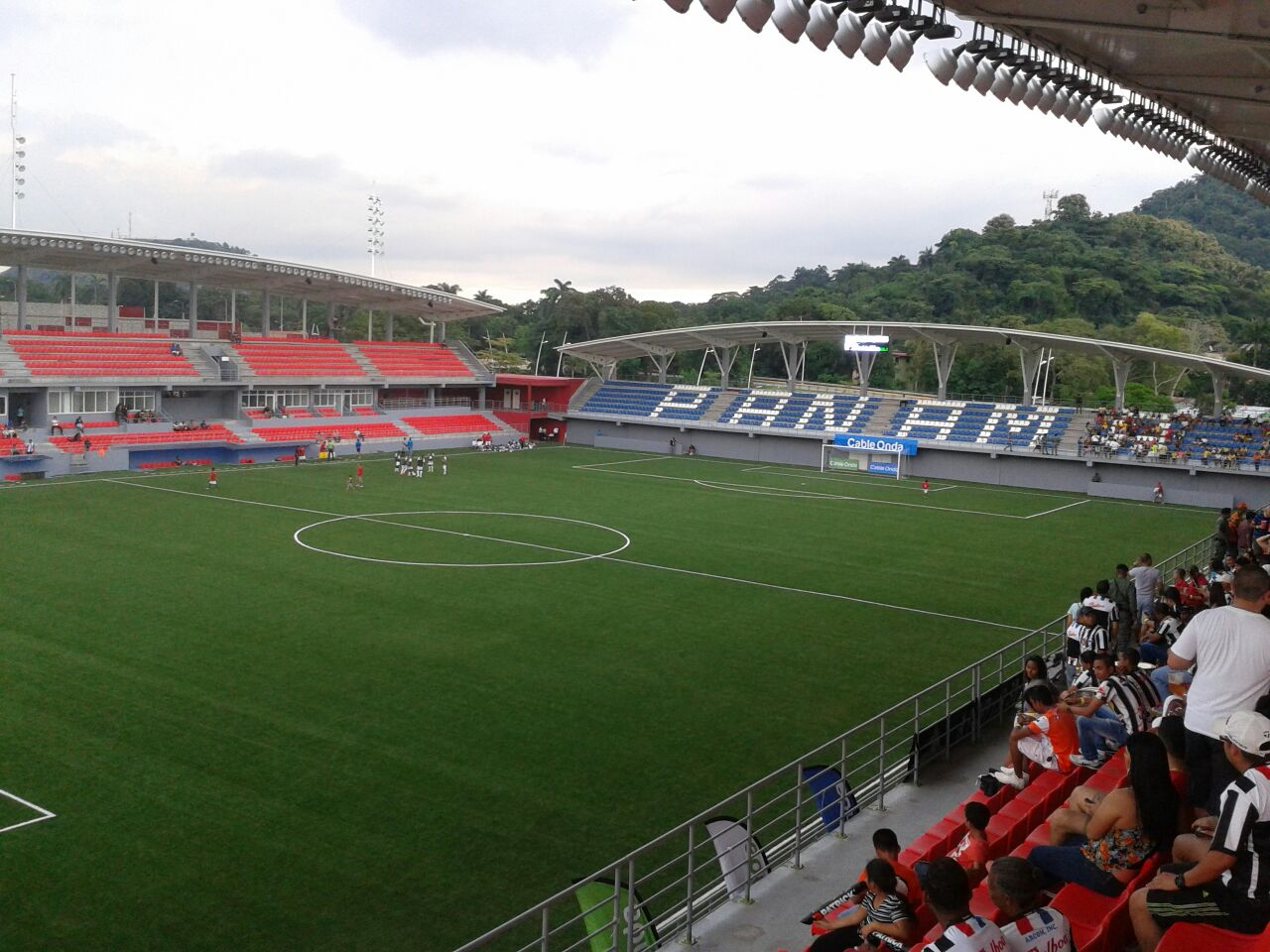
- Interactive map of Estadio Maracaná
- Location: Panama City, Panama
- Coordinates: 8°56′45.25″N 79°32′58.15″W
- Owner: Instituto Panameño de Deportes
- Operator: Instituto Panameño de Deportes
- Capacity: 6,000
- Surface: Artificial turf
- Field size: 100 x 64 m

Construction
- Groundbreaking: October 2013
- Opened: April 9, 2014
- Builder: Constructora Norberto Odebrecht

Tenant
- C.D. Plaza Amador

Estadio Maracaná is a football stadium in Panama City, Panama. It was inaugurated in April 2014 and has a capacity of 5,500. It is the home stadium of Club Deportivo Plaza Amador. It was named after the legendary Maracanã Stadium in Rio de Janeiro, Brazil. It would have been used to host matches during the 2020 FIFA U-20 Women's World Cup with venues in the rest of the country and Costa Rica, until that got canceled due to the pandemic shutdowns.
