= Panamanian Football Federation =

Governing body of association football in Panama

CONCACAF
- Short name: FEPAFUT
- Founded: 1937; 89 years ago
- Headquarters: Panama City
- FIFA affiliation: 1937
- CONCACAF affiliation: 1961
- President: Manuel Arias
- Website: https://www.fepafut.com/

The Panamanian Football Federation (Spanish: Federación Panameña de Fútbol), known as FEPAFUT, is the official governing body of football in Panama and is in charge of the Panama national football team. FEPAFUT was a founding member of CONCACAF in 1961.

== Association staff ==
Name	Position	Source
(Panama) Manuel Arias	President	
(Panama) Fernando Arce Mendizabal	Vice President	
(Panama) Miguel Zuñiga	General Secretary	
(Panama) Darinel Espino	Treasurer	
(Panama) Jaime Arias	Technical Director	
(Spain) Thomas Christiansen	Team Coach (Men's)	
(Spain) María Is	Team Coach (Women's)	
(Panama) Adan De Gracia	Media/Communications Manager	
(Cuba) Agustin Campuzano	Futsal Coordinator	
(Panama) Elix Peralta	Referee Coordinator	
(Panama) Gerasio Puello	2nd Referee Coordinator	

== See also ==
- Football in Panama
