= San Francisco F.C. =

Panamanian football club

San Francisco
- Full name: San Francisco Fútbol Club de La Chorrera
- Nicknames: Los Monjes; Sanfra; El Poderoso de la Chorrera
- Founded: September 1971
- Ground: Estadio Agustín "Muquita" Sánchez; La Chorrera, Panamá
- Capacity: 3,000
- Chairman: Mateo Fábrega
- Manager: Gonzalo Soto
- League: Liga Panameña de Fútbol
- Apertura 2018: 2nd
Home colours	Away colours

San Francisco Fútbol Club is a professional football team located in La Chorrera, Panamá, that plays in Liga Panameña de Fútbol, the top Panamanian football league. It has been in the top flight of Panamanian football every year since 1988, when Panama's first professional league was organized. The club plays its games in Estadio Agustín Sánchez.

San Francisco has won 9 Liga Panameña de Fútbol championships, the third highest total of any team since 1988. The club has also finished second 9 times since 1988.

== History ==
=== Deportivo La Previsora ===
The club was founded in September 1971, and began playing in La Chorrera District league. At that time, the club was known as Club Deportivo La Previsora. It has been in continuous operation ever since. An early contender in ANAPROF (the first Panamanian professional league), La Previsora reached the finals in each of the league's first two seasons (losing to Plaza Amador and Tauro FC).

Since then, they have been regular contenders for national honors, winning nine titles (most recently in Apertura 2014).

=== San Francisco F.C. ===
The club's current name is derived from the patron saint of the La Chorrera District, Francis of Paola (San Francisco de Paula). The club was the best supported club in the LPF in 2011, averaging an attendance of 765 at their matches.

San Francisco's old crest

== Honours ==
- Liga Panameña de Fútbol: 9

1994–95, 1995–96, 2005 (C), 2006 (A), 2007 (C), 2008 (A), 2009 (A), 2011 (C), 2014 (A)

- Copa Panamá: 1

2015

== Players ==
=== Current squad ===
First team squad 9 April, 2026

Note: Flags indicate national team as defined under FIFA eligibility rules; some limited exceptions apply. Players may hold more than one non-FIFA nationality.

No.	Pos.	Nation	Player
1	GK	PAN	Xavier Cruz
2	DF	PAN	Rodolfo Rodríguez
4	DF	PAN	José Rivas
5	DF	PAN	Jaquin Gargonia
6	MF	PAN	Emmanuel Rangel
8	MF	PAN	Edilson Carrasquilla
9	FW	PAN	Ronaldo Dinolis
10	FW	PAN	Darwin Pinzón
11	FW	PAN	José Rivera
12	GK	PAN	Jorginho Frías
14	DF	PAN	Kevin Calderón
15	MF	PAN	Leonel Triana

No.	Pos.	Nation	Player
17	DF	PAN	Guillermo Benítez
18	DF	PAN	Aimar Rodríguez
20	MF	COL	Elver Rodríguez
21	FW	PAN	Bayron Walters
22	MF	PAN	Ernesto Walker
26	DF	COL	Luis Ortiz
27	MF	PAN	Vlair Simmons
38	MF	PAN	Wesley Lashley
47	FW	PAN	Azael Brown
62	DF	PAN	Kevin Galván
75	DF	PAN	Josué Wood
80	MF	COL	Jean Rivera

=== Notable players ===
Michael Amir Murillo

== Personnel ==
=== Management ===
Position	Name
Manager	(Colombia) (Panama) David Acosta
Goalkeeping Coach	(Panama) Gaspar Pérez
Fitness Coach	(Panama) Julio Rivera
Club Doctor	(Panama) Dr. Julio González
Kinesiology	(Panama) Víctor Jaén
Utility	(Panama) Marcelino Barrios
Reserve Manager	(Argentina) Leonardo Pipino

== Historical list of coaches ==
- (Uruguay) Edgardo Baldi (1979)
- (Colombia) Saúl Suárez (1988–90)
- (Panama) Leopoldo "Chino" Lee (1995–97)
- (England) (Panama) Gary Stempel (1996–98), (2001–07)
- (Uruguay) Miguel Mansilla (2004)
- (Peru) Pascual "Chato" Ramírez (Jan 2007–March 7)
- (Panama) Rubén Guevara (March 2007–07)
- (Paraguay) Cristóbal Maldonado (200?–March 9)
- (Panama) Rubén Guevara (March 2009–09)
- (England) (Panama) Gary Stempel (Oct 2009–10)
- (Argentina) Leonardo Ezequiel Pipino (December 2010 - October 12)
- (England) (Panama) Gary Stempel (October 2012 – 2016)
- (Panama) Mike Stump (June 2016- February 2017)
- (Panama) Pascual Moreno (February 2017 - August 2017)
- (Colombia) Andrés Domínguez (August 2017 - September 2018)
- (Colombia) Sergio "Checho" Angulo (September 2017 - December 2018)
- (Colombia) Gonzalo Soto (January 2019 - March 2021)
- (Colombia) José Manuel Rodríguez (March 2021 - June 2021)
- (Brazil) Carlos Leiria (June 2021 - September 2021)
- (Panama) Jorge Santos (September 2021 - December 2021)
- (Colombia) Gonzalo Soto (January 2022 -August 2022)
- (England) (Panama) Gary Stempel (August 2022 - September 2024)
- (Colombia) Nilton Bernal (September 2024 - June 2025)
- (Colombia) (Panama) David Acosta (July 2025 - Present)
