= Santa Gema F.C. =

Panamanian football club

- Full name: Santa Gema Fútbol Club
- Founded: 1983
- Ground: Estadio Agustín Sánchez; La Chorrera, Panama
- Capacity: 3,000
- Chairman: Roberto Ramos
- Manager: José Anthony Torres
Home colours

Santa Gema Fútbol Club was a Panamanian football team playing at the Liga Panameña de Fútbol, the team was disbanded by the league for lack of funds on May 10, 2019, and was relegated to amateur pyramidal level.

It is based in Arraiján, Panamá and it was founded in 1983.

== History ==
The club was created in 1983 and played in the Arraiján District's local football league. In 2011, Santa Gema was promoted to the Liga Nacional de Ascenso after defeating Club Atlético Evolution 4–0 in the 2011 edition of the Copa Rommel Fernández.

== Honours ==
- Copa Rommel Fernández: 1

2011

== Historical list of coaches ==
- (Panama) Rony Rojo (2014)
- (Panama) Leopoldo Lee (2015)
- (Panama) José Anthony Torres (2018–Present)
