= 2023 Liga Panameña de Fútbol =

Football league season

The 2023 Liga Panameña de Fútbol or 2023 Liga LPF (known as the Liga LPF Tigo for sponsorship reasons) was the 36th season of the Liga Panameña de Fútbol (LPF), the top-flight football league in Panama, and the fourth under the management of the Liga Panameña de Fútbol. The season began on 13 January 2023, when the Apertura tournament started, and ended on 12 November 2023 with the Clausura tournament Final.

== Competition format ==
Same as previous years, the season was divided into two championships: Torneo Apertura and Torneo Clausura. Both Apertura and Clausura were played under the same format which consisted in a Classification stage, where the 12 teams were geographically divided into the Eastern and Western Conferences (6 teams per conference); Play-offs, Semifinals and Final.

Within each conference, teams played each other twice on a double round-robin format (home and away). In addition, each team played one game against all the 6 teams in the opposite conference for a total of 16 games per team in the classification stage. Winners of each conference qualified directly to the semi-finals, whilst the second and third placed teams advanced to the play-offs stage.

The Play-offs stage was played on a single-leg format between the second placed team of each conference against the third placed team of the opposite conference, with the second placed teams hosting the matches. Winners of play-offs advanced to semi-finals to play against the first placed team of each conference on a home-and-away two-legged basis. Winners of the semifinals played the final on a single-leg match at a venue and date determined by the LFP, with highest team ranked in the classification stage acting as the "home" team for administrative purposes.

== Teams ==
Locations of the 2023 Liga Panameña de Fútbol teams

A total of 12 teams took part in this season; the top eleven teams from the aggregate table of the 2022 season as well as UMECIT, who were promoted from the 2022 Liga Prom after being champions of both Apertura and Clausura tournaments of the 2022 Liga Prom season. They replaced and took the place in the Western Conference of Veraguas United, the bottom team in the aggregate table of the 2022 season, who were relegated to Liga Prom.

=== Stadia and locations ===
Team	City	Stadium	Capacity
Eastern Conference
Alianza	Panama City	Javier Cruz	700
Árabe Unido	Colón	Armando Dely Valdés	4,000
Plaza Amador	Panama City	Rommel Fernandez	32,000
Plaza Amador	Panama City	Javier Cruz	700
Potros del Este	Panama City	Javier Cruz	700
Sporting San Miguelito	San Miguelito	Los Andes	1,450
Tauro	Panama City	Rommel Fernandez	32,000
Western Conference
Atlético Chiriquí	David	San Cristóbal	2,890
Independiente	La Chorrera	Agustín Sánchez	3,040
Herrera	Chitré	Los Milagros	1,000
San Francisco	La Chorrera	Agustín Sánchez	3,040
UMECIT	Atalaya	Atalaya	500
Universitario	Penonomé	Universidad Latina	3,500

1. ^{a} By regulations, UMECIT took the venue of the relegated Veraguas United in the Western Conference even though its original location is in San Miguelito.

=== Personnel and kits ===
Team	Head coach	Captain	Kit manufacturer	Shirt sponsor(s)
Alianza	(Colombia) Jair Palacios	(Panama) Kevin Melgar	Keuka	ShowTime, Clinilab Panamá
Árabe Unido	(Venezuela) Alberto Valencia	(Panama) Harold Cummings	Kelme	Kendall Motor Oil, AguAseo
Atlético Chiriquí	(Colombia) Herney Duque	(Panama) Miguel Saavedra		Transporte Rivera Hermanos S.A., Hotel Ciudad de David
Herrera	(Spain) Miguel Corral	(Panama) Juan González	Adidas	Varela Hermanos S.A., Betcris
Independiente	(Panama) Franklin Narváez	(Panama) Rafael Águila	Everlast	Altos De La Pradera, Eco Moda, Powerade
Plaza Amador	(Panama) Ameth de León	(Panama) Ricardo Buitrago	Puma	Sportium, SPARK
Potros del Este	(Venezuela) Ángel Sánchez	(Panama) Edgar Góndola	Luanvi	Bridgestone
San Francisco	(Panama) Gary Stempel	(Panama) Francisco Palacios	Valor	TicketMore
Sporting San Miguelito	(Spain) David Dóniga	(Panama) Pedro Jeanine	Spirits	Sparkle Power S.A.
Tauro	(Panama) Felipe Baloy	(Panama) Jan Carlos Vargas	Patrick	Terpel, Universidad del Istmo, KFC
Universitario	(Venezuela) Julio Infante	(Panama) Manuel Torres	Sheffy	Latin University of Panama, Learding Vila, Banco LAFISE
UMECIT	(Panama) Javier Torres (interim)	(Panama) Jacinto Fuentes	Adidas	UMECIT

=== Managerial changes ===
Team	Outgoing manager	Manner of departure	Date of vacancy	Position in table	Incoming manager	Date of appointment
Torneo Apertura
Plaza Amador	(Panama) Jorge Dely Valdés	Resigned	31 October 2022	Pre-season	(Uruguay) Saúl Maldonado	2 December 2022
Herrera	(Venezuela) Alberto Valencia	Mutual agreement	December 2022	Pre-season	(Spain) Miguel Corral	21 December 2022
Plaza Amador	(Uruguay) Saúl Maldonado	Resigned	16 April 2023	6th, EC	(Panama) Ameth de León (Note: Originally as caretaker manager, appointed on a permanent basis for the Clausura tournament.)	17 April 2023
Tauro	(Venezuela) Francisco Perlo	Sacked	23 April 2023	4th, EC	(Argentina) Diego Gutierre (Note: Caretaker manager.)	23 April 2023
Atlético Chiriquí	(Colombia) Dayron Pérez	Resigned	29 April 2023	6th, WC	(Venezuela) Jonathan Parra	July 2023
UMECIT	(Colombia) Fredy Romero	Mutual agreement	30 April 2023	4th, WC	(Venezuela) Francisco Perlo	15 May 2023
Potros del Este	(Venezuela) Daniel Blanco	End of contract	9 May 2023	4th, EC	(Venezuela) Ángel Sánchez	1 June 2023
Torneo Clausura
Tauro	(Argentina) Diego Gutierre	End of caretaker spell	27 May 2023	Pre-tournament	(Panama) Felipe Baloy	11 June 2023
Sporting San Miguelito	(Brazil) Felipe Borowsky	Sacked	31 May 2023	Pre-tournament	(Spain) David Dóniga	12 June 2023
Árabe Unido	(Panama) Julio Dely Valdés	Resigned	15 August 2023	6th, EC	(Venezuela) Alberto Valencia	16 August 2023
Atlético Chiriquí	(Venezuela) Jonathan Parra	Resigned	11 September 2023	6th, WC	(Colombia) Herney Duque	September 2023
UMECIT	(Venezuela) Francisco Perlo	Mutual agreement	12 September 2023	5th, WC	(Panama) Javier Torres	12 September 2023

== Torneo Apertura ==
The Torneo Apertura began on 13 January and ended on 27 May with the final. Independiente were the defending champions, having won the Clausura 2022 tournament at the previous season.

=== Classification phase ===
The classification phase of the Apertura tournament ran from 13 January to 29 April 2023.

==== Eastern Conference ====
Pos	Team	Pld	W	D	L	GF	GA	GD	Pts	Qualification
1	Sporting San Miguelito	16	7	6	3	20	13	+7	27	Advance to Semi-finals
2	Plaza Amador	16	6	4	6	19	17	+2	22	Advance to Play-offs
3	Tauro	16	6	4	6	15	13	+2	22	Advance to Play-offs
4	Potros del Este	16	6	2	8	22	25	−3	20	
5	Árabe Unido	16	4	7	5	14	12	+2	19	
6	Alianza	16	5	4	7	11	17	−6	19	

Source: LPF

==== Western Conference ====
Pos	Team	Pld	W	D	L	GF	GA	GD	Pts	Qualification
1	Independiente	16	9	3	4	33	17	+16	30	Advance to Semi-finals
2	Herrera	16	7	6	3	24	14	+10	27	Advance to Play-offs
3	Universitario	16	6	4	6	18	22	−4	22	Advance to Play-offs
4	UMECIT	16	5	6	5	14	14	0	21	
5	San Francisco	16	3	9	4	11	17	−6	18	
6	Atlético Chiriquí	16	3	3	10	13	33	−20	12	

Source: LPF

==== Results ====
The match schedule was announced on 9 January 2023.

Home \ Away	ALI	DAU	ACH	HER	IND	PLA	CDE	SFR	SSM	TAU	UME	CDU
Alianza	—	0–2	2–1	—	0–1	2–1	0–1	0–0	0–0	2–1	—	—
Árabe Unido	0–0	—	—	1–1	—	0–0	4–1	0–0	0–2	0–1	—	1–2
Atlético Chiriquí	—	0–0	—	2–0	1–6	0–3	—	3–1	1–0	—	1–1	0–0
Herrera	2–1	—	4–0	—	3–0	—	3–2	0–0	—	0–0	1–0	3–4
Independiente	—	2–1	3–0	1–3	—	1–2	—	3–0	—	0–0	4–0	4–1
Plaza Amador	3–1	0–1	—	0–2	—	—	1–1	—	1–0	1–2	0–0	0–1
Potros del Este	2–0	0–2	2–1	—	1–1	1–2	—	—	1–2	2–0	—	4–0
San Francisco	—	—	1–0	0–0	2–2	1–1	1–3	—	1–1	—	0–0	2–1
Sporting San Miguelito	2–0	1–0	—	1–1	1–2	4–2	2–1	—	—	2–2	0–0	—
Tauro	0–1	1–1	3–0	—	—	0–2	2–0	2–0	0–1	—	0–1	—
UMECIT	0–1	1–1	3–1	1–0	1–3	—	4–0	0–0	—	—	—	1–0
Universitario	1–1	—	4–2	1–1	1–0	—	—	0–1	1–1	0–1	1–0	—

Source: LPF, Soccerway
Legend: Blue = home team win; Yellow = draw; Red = away team win.

=== Bracket ===
The play-offs, semi-finals and final were scheduled to be played between 6 and 27 May 2023.

Play-offs
E2	Plaza Amador	6
W3	Universitario	0
W2	Herrera	1
E3	Tauro	2

Semi-finals
E2	Plaza Amador	0	1	1
W1	Independiente	0	3	3
E3	Tauro	2	2	4
E1	Sporting San Miguelito	1	1	2

Final
W1	Independiente	3
E3	Tauro	1

=== Play-offs ===
6 May 2023
19:00

Plaza Amador	6–0	Universitario
Ramírez 32', 62'; Murillo 35', 49'; Dinolis 73', 78'	Report

Estadio Rommel Fernández, Panama City
Referee: Oliver Vergara

7 May 2023
18:15

Herrera	1–2	Tauro
Córdoba 48'	Report	Medina 8'; Negrete 11'

Estadio Los Milagros, Chitré
Referee: Noriel Reina

=== Semi-finals ===
14 May 2023
18:15

Tauro	2–1	Sporting San Miguelito
Asprilla 34'; Golúz 38'	Report	Dupuy 2'

Estadio Rommel Fernández, Panama City
Referee: Cristian Pinilla
19 May 2023
20:00

Sporting San Miguelito	1–2	Tauro
Rodríguez 3'	Report	Vargas 50'; Golúz 69'

Estadio Los Andes, San Miguelito
Referee: Fernando Morón

Tauro won 4–2 on aggregate and advanced to the final.

12 May 2023
20:00

Plaza Amador	0–0	Independiente
	Report

Estadio Rommel Fernández, Panama City
Referee: Fernando Morón
20 May 2023
19:00

Independiente	3–1	Plaza Amador
Small 6'; Águila 94'; Valverde 120+3'	Report	Ramírez 25' (o.g.)

Estadio Agustín Sánchez, La Chorrera
Referee: Noriel Reina

Independiente won 3–1 on aggregate and advanced to the final.

=== Final ===
27 May 2023
19:00

Independiente	3–1	Tauro
Negrete 2' (o.g.); Ávila 77'; Valverde 90+2'	Report	Golúz 27'

Estadio Rommel Fernández, Panama City
Referee: Oliver Vergara

Torneo Apertura 2023 winners

5th title

=== Top goalscorers ===
Players sorted first by goals scored, then by last name. The list includes goals scored in play-offs, semi-finals and final.

Rank	Player	Club	Goals
1	(Panama) Ronaldo Córdoba	Herrera	16
2	(Colombia) Breidy Golúz	Tauro	8
3	(Panama) Alessandro Canales	Potros del Este	6
3	(Panama) José Murillo	Plaza Amador	6
5	(Panama) Ronaldo Dinolis	Plaza Amador	5
5	(Panama) Darwin Pinzón	UMECIT	5
5	(Panama) Carlos Small	Independiente	5
5	(Panama) César Yanis	Potros del Este	5
9	(Panama) Rafael Águila	Independiente	4
9	(Panama) Víctor Ávila	Independiente	4
9	(Panama) Omar Browne	Tauro	4
9	(Panama) Valentín Pimentel	Sporting San Miguelito	4
9	(Panama) Miguel Saavedra	Atlético Chiriquí	4
9	(Panama) Jorge Serrano	Independiente	4
9	(Panama) Anthony Stewart	Independiente	4

Source: Soccerway

=== Clausura 2022 and Apertura 2023 aggregate table ===
The aggregate table of the Clausura 2022 and Apertura 2023 tournaments was used to determine the Panamanian teams qualified for the 2023 CONCACAF Central American Cup. As Independiente were the champions in both Clausura 2022 and Apertura 2023 tournaments, the remaining two qualified teams were the next two better placed teams in the aggregate table.

Pos	Team	Pld	W	D	L	GF	GA	GD	Pts	Qualification
1	Independiente (C)	32	19	5	8	59	28	+31	62	Qualification for CONCACAF Central American Cup
2	Sporting San Miguelito	32	13	13	6	41	29	+12	52	Qualification for CONCACAF Central American Cup
3	Universitario	32	13	9	10	43	42	+1	48	Qualification for CONCACAF Central American Cup
4	Plaza Amador	32	12	10	10	37	34	+3	46	
5	Tauro	32	13	7	12	30	28	+2	46	
6	Árabe Unido	32	11	11	10	34	25	+9	44	
7	Alianza	32	12	7	13	26	32	−6	43	
8	Potros del Este	32	12	6	14	47	46	+1	42	
9	Herrera	32	9	13	10	34	42	−8	40	
10	San Francisco	32	8	12	12	31	35	−4	36	
11	Atlético Chiriquí	32	4	11	17	20	58	−38	23	
12	UMECIT	16	5	6	5	14	14	0	21	

Source: LPF
(C) Champions

== Torneo Clausura ==
The Torneo Clausura began on 21 July and ended on 2 December with the final. Independiente were the two-time defending champions, having won the previous Clausura 2022 and Apertura 2023 tournaments.

=== Classification phase ===
The classification phase of the Clausura tournament ran from 21 July to 7 November 2023 (originally 1 November 2023).

==== Eastern Conference ====
Pos	Team	Pld	W	D	L	GF	GA	GD	Pts	Qualification
1	Tauro	16	9	5	2	28	14	+14	32	Advance to Semi-finals
2	Sporting San Miguelito	16	8	4	4	24	11	+13	28	Advance to Play-offs
3	Alianza	16	6	6	4	17	17	0	24	Advance to Play-offs
4	Árabe Unido	16	6	5	5	16	16	0	23	
5	Plaza Amador	16	5	4	7	22	17	+5	19	
6	Potros del Este	16	4	4	8	20	29	−9	16	

Source: LPF

==== Western Conference ====
Pos	Team	Pld	W	D	L	GF	GA	GD	Pts	Qualification
1	Independiente	16	11	4	1	39	16	+23	37	Advance to Semi-finals
2	San Francisco	16	7	4	5	19	14	+5	25	Advance to Play-offs
3	Herrera	16	6	5	5	28	20	+8	23	Advance to Play-offs
4	Universitario	16	5	6	5	15	19	−4	21	
5	UMECIT	16	3	2	11	18	25	−7	11	
6	Atlético Chiriquí	16	0	3	13	9	57	−48	3	

Source: LPF

==== Results ====
The match schedule was announced on 10 July 2023.

Home \ Away	ALI	DAU	ACH	HER	IND	PLA	CDE	SFR	SSM	TAU	UME	CDU
Alianza	—	0–2	—	3–1	—	2–0	2–1	—	0–0	0–0	0–1	1–1
Árabe Unido	0–1	—	2–1	—	0–1	3–2	1–1	—	0–0	0–4	1–0	—
Atlético Chiriquí	1–2	—	—	2–2	2–6	—	1–2	0–6	—	0–5	1–4	1–2
Herrera	—	2–0	9–0	—	1–1	2–1	—	0–0	0–0	—	3–1	1–1
Independiente	1–1	—	4–0	4–2	—	—	3–1	2–0	2–1	—	1–0	4–0
Plaza Amador	3–0	0–0	5–0	—	2–1	—	1–1	0–1	4–2	0–0	—	—
Potros del Este	2–3	1–1	—	2–1	—	0–3	—	0–2	1–3	2–3	2–2	—
San Francisco	2–2	0–2	0–0	3–1	0–2	—	—	—	—	0–0	2–1	2–1
Sporting San Miguelito	0–0	2–1	4–0	—	—	1–0	0–1	2–0	—	3–0	—	4–0
Tauro	2–0	1–3	—	1–0	3–3	2–0	2–1	—	2–1	—	—	1–1
UMECIT	—	—	4–0	1–2	3–4	0–0	—	0–1	0–1	0–2	—	0–2
Universitario	—	0–0	0–0	0–1	0–0	2–1	1–2	1–0	—	—	3–1	—

Source: LPF, Soccerway
Legend: Blue = home team win; Yellow = draw; Red = away team win.

=== Bracket ===
The play-offs, semi-finals and final were originally scheduled to be played between 11 November and 1 December, however, the dates were pushed back in order to facilitate the call-up of players from the Liga Panameña de Fútbol to the Panama national football team during the November FIFA window.

Play-offs
E2	Sporting San Miguelito	2
W3	Herrera	0
W2	San Francisco	1 (4)
E3	Alianza (p)	1 (5)

Semi-finals
E2	Sporting San Miguelito	2	1	3
W1	Independiente	2	2	4
E3	Alianza	0	1	1
E1	Tauro	1	2	3

Final
W1	Independiente	3
E1	Tauro	0

=== Play-offs ===
21 November 2023
20:30

Sporting San Miguelito	2–0	Herrera
Torres 27' (pen.); Hurtado 90'	Report

Estadio Los Andes, San Miguelito
Referee: Oliver Vergara

22 November 2023
20:30

San Francisco	1–1 (a.e.t.)	Alianza
Soto 54'	Report	Perdomo 26'
Penalties
J. Rodríguez (penalty scored); Gómez (penalty missed); A. Rodríguez (penalty scored); Cundumí (penalty scored); Ramírez (penalty scored)	4–5	(penalty scored) Beltrán; (penalty scored) Díaz; (penalty scored) Villegas; (penalty scored) Perdomo; (penalty scored) Medina

Estadio Agustín Sánchez, La Chorrera
Referee: Fernando Morón

=== Semi-finals ===
26 November 2023
16:00

Alianza	0–1	Tauro
		Blackburn 73'

Estadio Javier Cruz, Panama City
Referee: Jorge Leira
3 December 2023
15:00

Tauro	2–1	Alianza
Browne 60'; Jaén 71' (pen.)	Report	Rodríguez 33'

Estadio Javier Cruz, Panama City
Referee: Oliver Vergara

Tauro won 3–1 on aggregate and advanced to the final.

25 November 2023
18:00

Sporting San Miguelito	2–2	Independiente
Torres 65', 90+2'	Report	Ávila 49' (pen.); Serrano 69'

Estadio Los Andes, San Miguelito
Referee: José Carrasco
2 December 2023
18:00

Independiente	2–1	Sporting San Miguelito
Small 48'; Ávila 78'	Report	Torres 81'

Estadio Agustín Sánchez, La Chorrera
Referee: Jorge Negron

Independiente won 4–3 on aggregate and advanced to the final.

=== Final ===
The final was scheduled to be played on 9 December 2023 at Estadio Universidad Latina in Penonomé. The team with the best performance in the classification phase (Independiente) acted as the "home" team for administrative purposes.

9 December 2023
18:15

Independiente	3–0	Tauro
Small 6', 21'; Stewart 89'	Report

Estadio Universidad Latina, Penonomé
Referee: Fernando Morón

Torneo Clausura 2023 winners

6th title

=== Top goalscorers ===
Players sorted first by goals scored, then by last name. The list includes goals scored in play-offs, semi-finals and final.

Rank	Player	Club	Goals
1	(Panama) Víctor Ávila	Independiente	12
2	(Panama) Carlos Small	Independiente	11
3	(Panama) Rolando Blackburn	Tauro	9
4	(Panama) Ronni Villarreal	Herrera	8
5	(Colombia) Breidy Golúz	Tauro	6
5	(Panama) Juan González	Herrera	6
5	(Panama) Valentín Pimentel	Sporting San Miguelito	6
8	(Panama) Ricardo Ávila	Universitario	5
8	(Panama) Ronaldo Dinolis	Plaza Amador	5
8	(Panama) Ansony Frías	Árabe Unido	5
8	(Panama) Ovidio López	Plaza Amador	5
8	(Panama) Kevin Meneses	Independiente	5
8	(Panama) Darwin Pinzón	UMECIT	5
8	(Panama) Richard Rodríguez	Alianza	5
8	(Panama) Alberto Saldaña	Atlético Chiriquí	5
8	(Panama) Gabriel Torres	Sporting San Miguelito	5

Source: Soccerway

== Aggregate table ==
The aggregate table of the 2023 season was used to determine the team relegated to the 2024 Liga Prom.

Pos	Team	Pld	W	D	L	GF	GA	GD	Pts	Relegation
1	Independiente (C)	32	20	7	5	72	33	+39	67	
2	Sporting San Miguelito	32	15	10	7	43	24	+19	55	
3	Tauro	32	15	9	8	43	27	+16	54	
4	Herrera	32	13	11	8	52	33	+19	50	
5	San Francisco	32	10	13	9	30	31	−1	43	
6	Alianza	32	11	10	11	28	34	−6	43	
7	Universitario	32	11	10	11	33	41	−8	43	
8	Árabe Unido	32	10	12	10	30	28	+2	42	
9	Plaza Amador	32	11	8	13	41	34	+7	41	
10	Potros del Este	32	10	6	16	42	54	−12	36	
11	UMECIT	32	8	8	16	32	39	−7	32	
12	Atlético Chiriquí (R)	32	3	6	23	22	90	−68	15	Relegation to Liga Prom

Source: LPF
(C) Champions; (R) Relegated
