= 2023 CONCACAF Central American Cup knockout stage =

The 2023 CONCACAF Central American Cup knockout stage was played from 26 September to 5 December 2023. A total of 8 teams competed in the knockout stage to decide the champions of the 2023 CONCACAF Central American Cup.

== Qualified teams ==
The winners and runners-up of each of the four groups in the group stage advanced to the quarter-finals.

Group	Winners	Runners-up
A	(Costa Rica) Saprissa	(Costa Rica) Cartaginés
B	(Panama) Independiente	(Nicaragua) Real Estelí
C	(Costa Rica) Herediano	(Guatemala) Comunicaciones
D	(Costa Rica) Alajuelense	(Honduras) Motagua

=== Seeding ===
Teams were seeded 1–8 based on results in the group stage and assigned a position in a fixed bracket. For example, the first semi-final was contested between the winner of the 1 vs. 8 quarter-final and the winner of the 4 vs. 5 quarter-final. For each round, the host of the second leg was determined based on performance in all previous rounds, including the group stage.

== Format ==
The knockout stage was played on a single-elimination tournament with the following rules:

- Each tie was played on a home-and-away two-legged basis. The home team of the second leg in each tie was determined separately for each round as follows (Regulations Article 12.11):
  - In the quarter-finals, the group winners hosted the second leg.
  - In the semi-finals and play-in, the higher-ranked teams based on total points accumulated in the group stage and the quarterfinals hosted the second leg.
  - In the finals, the higher-ranked team based on total points accumulated in the group stage, quarterfinals, and semi-finals hosted the second leg.
- In the quarter-finals and semi-finals, if tied on aggregate, the away goals rule would be used. If still tied, the penalty shoot-out would be directly used to determine the winners (Regulations Article 12.10.2).
- In the play-in and finals, if tied on aggregate, the away goals rule would also be used. If still tied, 30 minutes of extra time would be played without the away goals rule during this time. If still tied after extra time, the penalty shoot-out would be used to determine the winner (Regulations Article 12.10.3).

== Bracket ==
The bracket of the final stages was determined as follows:

Round	Matchups
Quarter-finals	(Group winner team host second leg): Match QF1: Team seeded 1 vs. Team seeded 8; Match QF2: Team seeded 4 vs. Team seeded 5; Match QF3: Team seeded 2 vs. Team seeded 7; Match QF4: Team seeded 3 vs. Team seeded 6
Play-in round	(Higher-ranked team in each tie host second leg): Match PI1: Loser QF1 vs. Loser QF2; Match PI2: Loser QF3 vs. Loser QF4
Semi-finals	(Higher-ranked team in each tie host second leg): Match SF1: Winner QF1 vs. Winner QF2; Match SF2: Winner QF3 vs. Winner QF4
Finals	(Higher-ranked team host second leg): Winner SF1 vs. Winner SF2

The bracket was decided based on the quarter-finals seeding.

Play-in
(Honduras) Motagua	2	0	2
(Costa Rica) Saprissa	2	4	6
(Costa Rica) Cartaginés	1	1	2 (4)
(Guatemala) Comunicaciones (p)	1	1	2 (5)

Quarter-finals
7	(Nicaragua) Real Estelí	1	2	3
2	(Costa Rica) Saprissa	0	2	2
6	(Honduras) Motagua	1	0	1
3	(Panama) Independiente	1	2	3
5	(Guatemala) Comunicaciones	0	2	2
4	(Costa Rica) Herediano	0	3	3
8	(Costa Rica) Cartaginés	1	0	1
1	(Costa Rica) Alajuelense	3	3	6

Semi-finals
(Nicaragua) Real Estelí	1	2	3
(Panama) Independiente	0	2	2
(Costa Rica) Herediano	2	2	4 (4)
(Costa Rica) Alajuelense (p)	2	2	4 (5)

Finals
(Nicaragua) Real Estelí	0	1	1
(Costa Rica) Alajuelense	3	1	4

1. ^{†} Order of legs to be decided, with the higher-ranked team in each tie hosting the second leg.

== Quarter-finals ==
In the quarter-finals, the teams were seeded based on their results in the group stage, with the group winners seeded 1–4, and the group runners-up seeded 5–8. The group winners hosted the second leg.

Seed	Grp	Team	Pld	W	D	L	GF	GA	GD	Pts	Matchups
1	D	(Costa Rica) Alajuelense	4	4	0	0	10	1	+9	12	Match QF1
2	A	(Costa Rica) Saprissa	4	3	1	0	10	0	+10	10	Match QF3
3	B	(Panama) Independiente	4	3	1	0	11	3	+8	10	Match QF4
4	C	(Costa Rica) Herediano	4	3	1	0	8	4	+4	10	Match QF2
5	C	(Guatemala) Comunicaciones	4	3	0	1	9	4	+5	9	Match QF2
6	D	(Honduras) Motagua	4	3	0	1	9	5	+4	9	Match QF4
7	B	(Nicaragua) Real Estelí	4	3	0	1	5	2	+3	9	Match QF3
8	A	(Costa Rica) Cartaginés	4	2	1	1	8	3	+5	7	Match QF1

Source: CONCACAF
Rules for classification: 1) Points; 2) Goal difference; 3) Goals scored; 4) Away goals scored; 5) Wins; 6) Away wins; 7) Disciplinary points (1 point for yellow card, 3 points for second yellow card/indirect red card, 4 points for direct red card, 5 points for yellow card and direct red card); 8) Drawing of lots (Regulations Article 12.11.4).

=== Summary ===
The first legs were played on 26–28 September, and the second legs were played on 3–5 October 2023.

Team 1	Agg.	Team 2	1st leg	2nd leg
Cartaginés (Costa Rica)	1–6	(Costa Rica) Alajuelense	1–3	0–3
Comunicaciones (Guatemala)	2–3	(Costa Rica) Herediano	0–0	2–3
Real Estelí (Nicaragua)	3–2	(Costa Rica) Saprissa	1–0	2–2
Motagua (Honduras)	1–3	(Panama) Independiente	1–1	0–2

=== Matches ===
28 September 2023
22:00 (20:00 UTC−6)

Cartaginés (Costa Rica)	1–3	(Costa Rica) Alajuelense
Hernández 88'	Report	Campbell 55'; Venegas 64'; Suárez 67'

Estadio José Rafael Fello Meza Ivankovich, Cartago
Referee: Nelson Salgado (Honduras)
5 October 2023
22:00 (20:00 UTC−6)

Alajuelense (Costa Rica)	3–0	(Costa Rica) Cartaginés
A. López 8'; Suárez 35'; Góndola 89'	Report

Estadio Alejandro Morera Soto, Alajuela
Referee: Drew Fischer (Canada)

Alajuelense won 6–1 on aggregate, advanced to the semi-finals (Match SF1) and qualified for the 2024 CONCACAF Champions Cup Round One at minimum. Cartaginés advanced to the play-in.

27 September 2023
22:00 (20:00 UTC−6)

Comunicaciones (Guatemala)	0–0	(Costa Rica) Herediano
	Report

Estadio Doroteo Guamuch Flores, Guatemala City
Referee: Filiberto Martínez (El Salvador)
4 October 2023
22:15 (20:15 UTC−6)

Herediano (Costa Rica)	3–2	(Guatemala) Comunicaciones
Sayago 24' (pen.), 51'; Faerron 90+3'	Report	Corena 55'; González 76'

Estadio José Rafael Fello Meza Ivankovich, Cartago
Referee: Selvin Brown (Honduras)

Herediano won 3–2 on aggregate, advanced to the semi-finals (Match SF1) and qualified for the 2024 CONCACAF Champions Cup Round One at minimum. Comunicaciones advanced to the play-in.

27 September 2023
20:00 (18:00 UTC−6)

Real Estelí (Nicaragua)	1–0	(Costa Rica) Saprissa
Hernández 10'	Report

Estadio Independencia, Estelí
Referee: Julio Luna (Guatemala)
4 October 2023
20:00 (18:00 UTC−6)

Saprissa (Costa Rica)	2–2	(Nicaragua) Real Estelí
East 20'; Sinclair 82'	Report	Escobar 51' (o.g.); Fletes 71'

Estadio Ricardo Saprissa Aymá, San Juan de Tibás
Referee: Ismael Cornejo (El Salvador)

Real Estelí won 3–2 on aggregate, advanced to the semi-finals (Match SF2) and qualifies for the 2024 CONCACAF Champions Cup Round One at minimum. Saprissa advanced to the play-in.

26 September 2023
22:00 (20:00 UTC−6)

Motagua (Honduras)	1–1	(Panama) Independiente
Auzmendi 35'	Report	Hurtado 80'

Estadio Nacional Chelato Uclés, Tegucigalpa
Referee: David Gómez (Costa Rica)
3 October 2023
22:00 (21:00 UTC−5)

Independiente (Panama)	2–0	(Honduras) Motagua
Small 31', 45'	Report

Estadio Rommel Fernández, Panama City (Note: Independiente are playing their home matches at Estadio Rommel Fernández, Panama City (originally scheduled at Estadio Universitario, Penonomé) instead of their regular stadium Estadio Agustín Sánchez, La Chorrera which did not meet CONCACAF requirements.)
Referee: Bryan López (Guatemala)

Independiente won 3–1 on aggregate, advanced to the semi-finals (Match SF2) and qualifies for the 2024 CONCACAF Champions Cup Round One at minimum. Motagua advanced to the play-in.

== Semi-finals and Play-in ==
=== Play-in ===
In the play-in, the team in each tie which have the better performance across all previous rounds (group stage and quarter-finals) host the second leg.

Pos	Team	Pld	W	D	L	GF	GA	GD	Pts	Host
1 (PI1)	(Guatemala) Comunicaciones	6	3	1	2	11	7	+4	10	Second leg
2 (PI1)	(Costa Rica) Cartaginés	6	2	1	3	9	9	0	7	First leg
1 (PI2)	(Costa Rica) Saprissa	6	3	2	1	12	3	+9	11	Second leg
2 (PI2)	(Honduras) Motagua	6	3	1	2	10	8	+2	10	First leg

Source: CONCACAF
Rules for classification: 1) Points; 2) Goal difference; 3) Goals scored; 4) Away goals scored; 5) Wins; 6) Away wins; 7) Disciplinary points (1 point for yellow card, 3 points for second yellow card/indirect red card, 4 points for direct red card, 5 points for yellow card and direct red card); 8) Drawing of lots (Regulations Article 12.11.4).

==== Summary ====
The first legs were played on 24–25 October, and the second legs were played on 31 October – 1 November 2023.

Team 1	Agg.	Team 2	1st leg	2nd leg
Cartaginés (Costa Rica)	2–2 (4–5 p)	(Guatemala) Comunicaciones	1–1	1–1 (a.e.t.)
Motagua (Honduras)	2–6	(Costa Rica) Saprissa	2–2	0–4

==== Matches ====
24 October 2023
22:00 (20:00 UTC−6)

Cartaginés (Costa Rica)	1–1	(Guatemala) Comunicaciones
Daly 83'	Report	Gordillo 26'

Estadio José Rafael Fello Meza Ivankovich, Cartago
Referee: Pierre-Luc Lauzière (Canada)
31 October 2023
22:15 (20:15 UTC−6)

Comunicaciones (Guatemala)	1–1 (a.e.t.)	(Costa Rica) Cartaginés
Aguilar 27'	Report	Hernández 52' (pen.)
Penalties
Contreras (penalty missed); Espino (penalty scored); Fracchia (penalty scored); Anangonó (penalty missed); López (penalty scored); Corena (penalty scored); Pinto (penalty scored)	5–4	(penalty missed) Hernández; (penalty missed) López; (penalty scored) Vargas; (penalty scored) Guevara; (penalty scored) Smith; (penalty scored) Barahona; (penalty missed) Martínez

Estadio Doroteo Guamuch Flores, Guatemala City
Referee: Saíd Martínez (Honduras)

Tied 2–2 on aggregate, Comunicaciones won on penalties and qualified for the 2024 CONCACAF Champions Cup Round One.

25 October 2023
20:00 (18:00 UTC−6)

Motagua (Honduras)	2–2	(Costa Rica) Saprissa
Auzmendi 72', 90'	Report	Chirinos 42'; Madrigal 84'

Estadio Nacional Chelato Uclés, Tegucigalpa
Referee: Daniel Quintero (Mexico)
1 November 2023
20:00 (18:00 UTC−6)

Saprissa (Costa Rica)	4–0	(Honduras) Motagua
Rodríguez 2'; Waston 9'; Sinclair 45+1'; Paradela 86'	Report

Estadio Ricardo Saprissa Aymá, San Juan de Tibás
Referee: Iván Barton (El Salvador)

Saprissa won 6–2 on aggregate and qualified for the 2024 CONCACAF Champions Cup Round One.

=== Semi-finals ===
In the semi-finals, the team in each tie which have the better performance across all previous rounds (group stage and quarter-finals) host the second leg.

Pos	Team	Pld	W	D	L	GF	GA	GD	Pts	Host
1 (SF1)	(Costa Rica) Alajuelense	6	6	0	0	16	2	+14	18	Second leg
2 (SF1)	(Costa Rica) Herediano	6	4	2	0	11	6	+5	14	First leg
1 (SF2)	(Panama) Independiente	6	4	2	0	14	4	+10	14	Second leg
2 (SF2)	(Nicaragua) Real Estelí	6	4	1	1	8	4	+4	13	First leg

Source: CONCACAF
Rules for classification: 1) Points; 2) Goal difference; 3) Goals scored; 4) Away goals scored; 5) Wins; 6) Away wins; 7) Disciplinary points (1 point for yellow card, 3 points for second yellow card/indirect red card, 4 points for direct red card, 5 points for yellow card and direct red card); 8) Drawing of lots (Regulations Article 12.11.4).

==== Summary ====
The first legs were played on 25–26 October, and the second legs were played on 1–2 November 2023.

Team 1	Agg.	Team 2	1st leg	2nd leg
Herediano (Costa Rica)	4–4 (4–5 p)	(Costa Rica) Alajuelense	2–2	2–2
Real Estelí (Nicaragua)	3–2	(Panama) Independiente	1–0	2–2

==== Matches ====
25 October 2023
22:00 (20:00 UTC−6)

Herediano (Costa Rica)	2–2	(Costa Rica) Alajuelense
Cruz 46'; Godínez 50'	Report	Mora 7'; Venegas 49'

Estadio Ricardo Saprissa Aymá, San Juan de Tibás
Referee: Walter López (Guatemala)
1 November 2023
22:15 (20:15 UTC−6)

Alajuelense (Costa Rica)	2–2	(Costa Rica) Herediano
Borges 8'; Campbell 90+5' (pen.)	Report	Torres 40'; Rubio 64' (pen.)
Penalties
Venegas (penalty scored); Barrantes (penalty scored); González (penalty scored); Gamboa (penalty scored); Campbell (penalty scored)	5–4	(penalty missed) Basulto; (penalty scored) Aguilar; (penalty scored) Rubio; (penalty scored) Godínez; (penalty scored) Faerron

Estadio Alejandro Morera Soto, Alajuela
Referee: Víctor Cáceres (Mexico)

Tied 4–4 on aggregate, Alajuelense won on penalties and advanced to the finals.

26 October 2023
22:00 (20:00 UTC−6)

Real Estelí (Nicaragua)	1–0	(Panama) Independiente
Méndez 90+1'	Report

Estadio Independencia, Estelí
Referee: Juan Gabriel Calderón (Costa Rica)
2 November 2023
22:15 (21:15 UTC−5)

Independiente (Panama)	2–2	(Nicaragua) Real Estelí
Águila 14'; Contreras 63'	Report	Hernández 46'; A. Bonilla 81'

Estadio Rommel Fernández, Panama City
Referee: Rubiel Vazquez (United States)

Real Estelí won 3–2 on aggregate and advanced to the finals.

== Finals ==
In the finals, the team which has the better performances across all previous rounds (group stage, quarter-finals, and semi-finals) host the second leg.

Pos	Team	Pld	W	D	L	GF	GA	GD	Pts	Host
1	(Costa Rica) Alajuelense	8	6	2	0	20	6	+14	20	Second leg
2	(Nicaragua) Real Estelí	8	5	2	1	11	6	+5	17	First leg

Source: CONCACAF
Rules for classification: 1) Points; 2) Goal difference; 3) Goals scored; 4) Away goals scored; 5) Wins; 6) Away wins; 7) Disciplinary points (1 point for yellow card, 3 points for second yellow card/indirect red card, 4 points for direct red card, 5 points for yellow card and direct red card); 8) Drawing of lots (Regulations Article 12.11.4).

=== Summary ===
Team 1	Agg.	Team 2	1st leg	2nd leg
Real Estelí (Nicaragua)	1–4	(Costa Rica) Alajuelense	0–3	1–1

=== Matches ===
28 November 2023
22:00 (21:00 UTC−6)

Real Estelí (Nicaragua)	0–3	(Costa Rica) Alajuelense
	Report	Navarro 32'; Barrantes 45+2'; Góndola 49'

Estadio Independencia, Estelí
Attendance: 15,000
Referee: Pierre-Luc Lauzière (Canada)
5 December 2023
22:00 (21:00 UTC−6)

Alajuelense (Costa Rica)	1–1	(Nicaragua) Real Estelí
Campbell 5'	Report	B. Bonilla 47'

Estadio Alejandro Morera Soto, Alajuela
Referee: Julio Luna (Guatemala)

Alajuelense won 4–1 on aggregate and qualified for the 2024 CONCACAF Champions Cup Round of 16.
