= 2023 CONCACAF Central American Cup group stage =

Club football competition

The 2023 CONCACAF Central American Cup group stage was played from 1 to 31 August 2023. A total of 20 teams competed in the group stage to decide the 8 places in the knockout stage of the 2023 CONCACAF Central American Cup.

== Draw ==
The draw for the group stage was held on 8 June 2023 in Miami, Florida, United States. The 20 involved teams were previously seeded into five pots of four teams each based on their CONCACAF Club Ranking as of 28 May 2023.

Pot 1
Team	Rank
(Honduras) Olimpia	38
(Costa Rica) Saprissa	47
(Guatemala) Comunicaciones	49
(Costa Rica) Alajuelense	51

Pot 2
Team	Rank
(Honduras) Motagua	53
(Guatemala) Xelajú	57
(Costa Rica) Herediano	58
(Guatemala) Cobán Imperial	59

Pot 3
Team	Rank
(Honduras) Real España	60
(Panama) Independiente	61
(Costa Rica) Cartaginés	65
(Honduras) Olancho	67

Pot 4
Team	Rank
(Panama) Sporting San Miguelito	72
(El Salvador) Águila	79
(Panama) Universitario	95
(El Salvador) FAS	109

Pot 5
Team	Rank
(Nicaragua) Real Estelí	116
(Nicaragua) Diriangén	118
(El Salvador) Jocoro	132
(Belize) Verdes	177

For the group stage, the 20 teams were drawn into four groups (Groups A–D) of five containing a team from each of the five pots. Teams from pot 1 were drawn first and were placed in the first position of their group, starting from Group A to Group D. The same procedure was followed for teams from pots 2, 3, 4 and 5, and they were placed in positions 2, 3, 4 and 5, respectively, within the group to which they were drawn. Each group must contain no more than two clubs from the same national association.

The draw resulted in the following groups:

Group A
Pos	Team
A1	(Costa Rica) Saprissa
A2	(Guatemala) Cobán Imperial
A3	(Costa Rica) Cartaginés
A4	(Panama) Universitario
A5	(El Salvador) Jocoro

Group B
Pos	Team
B1	(Honduras) Olimpia
B2	(Guatemala) Xelajú
B3	(Panama) Independiente
B4	(El Salvador) FAS
B5	(Nicaragua) Real Estelí

Group C
Pos	Team
C1	(Guatemala) Comunicaciones
C2	(Costa Rica) Herediano
C3	(Honduras) Real España
C4	(El Salvador) Águila
C5	(Nicaragua) Diriangén

Group D
Pos	Team
D1	(Costa Rica) Alajuelense
D2	(Honduras) Motagua
D3	(Honduras) Olancho
D4	(Panama) Sporting San Miguelito
D5	(Belize) Verdes

== Format ==
In the group stage, each group is played on a single home-and-away round-robin basis, with teams playing against each other once, for a total of four matches per team (two home and two away). The teams are ranked according to the following criteria (Regulations Article 12.10.1):

1. Points (3 points for a win, 1 point for a draw, and 0 points for a loss);
2. Goal difference;
3. Goals scored;
4. If two or more teams are still tied after applying the above criteria, their rankings would be determined as follows:
  1. Head-to-head points in the matches played among the tied teams;
  2. Head-to-head goal difference in the matches played among the tied teams;
  3. Head-to-head goals scored in the matches played among the tied teams;
5. The lowest number of fairplay points, based on the following criteria:
  1. Yellow card: plus 1 point;
  2. Second yellow card/indirect red card: plus 3 points;
  3. Direct red card: plus 4 points;;
  4. Yellow card and direct red card: plus 5 points;
6. Drawing of lots by CONCACAF.

The winners and runners-up of each group advanced to the quarter-finals of the knockout stage.

== Schedule ==
Matches in the competition are being played on either Tuesday, Wednesday, or Thursday as decided by CONCACAF. The schedule of each week is as follows (Regulations Article 2).

Weeks	Dates	Matches
Week 1	1–3 August 2023	Team 1 vs. Team 3, Team 5 vs. Team 2
Week 2	8–10 August 2023	Team 5 vs. Team 1, Team 2 vs. Team 4
Week 3	15–17 August 2023	Team 4 vs. Team 5, Team 2 vs. Team 3
Week 4	22–24 August 2023	Team 4 vs. Team 1, Team 3 vs. Team 5
Week 5	29–31 August 2023	Team 1 vs. Team 2, Team 3 vs. Team 4

== Groups ==
All match times are in EDT (UTC−4) and local times are in parentheses, as listed by CONCACAF.

=== Group A ===
Pos	Team	Pld	W	D	L	GF	GA	GD	Pts	Qualification	SAP	CAR	UNI	COB	JOC
1	(Costa Rica) Saprissa	4	3	1	0	10	0	+10	10	Advance to Quarter-finals	—	1–0	—	5–0	—
2	(Costa Rica) Cartaginés	4	2	1	1	8	3	+5	7	Advance to Quarter-finals	—	—	2–2	—	5–0
3	(Panama) Universitario	4	1	3	0	6	3	+3	6		0–0	—	—	—	4–1
4	(Guatemala) Cobán Imperial	4	1	1	2	4	7	−3	4		—	0–1	0–0	—	—
5	(El Salvador) Jocoro	4	0	0	4	2	17	−15	0		0–4	—	—	1–4	—

Source: CONCACAF
1 August 2023
20:00 (18:00 UTC−6)

Jocoro (El Salvador)	1–4	(Guatemala) Cobán Imperial
Acuña 65' (pen.)	Report	Martínez 7'; A. López 42'; Janderson 51' (pen.); Porras 71'

Estadio Olímpico Metropolitano, San Pedro Sula (Honduras) (Note: Jocoro played their home matches at Estadio Olímpico Metropolitano, San Pedro Sula (Honduras) instead of their regular stadium Complejo Deportivo Municipal Tierra de Fuego, Jocoro which did not meet CONCACAF requirements.)
Referee: Jefferson Escobar (Honduras)
3 August 2023
22:00 (20:00 UTC−6)

Saprissa (Costa Rica)	1–0	(Costa Rica) Cartaginés
East 63'	Report

Estadio Ricardo Saprissa Aymá, San José
Referee: Melvin Matamoros (Honduras)

8 August 2023
20:00 (18:00 UTC−6)

Cobán Imperial (Guatemala)	0–0	(Panama) Universitario
	Report

Estadio Doroteo Guamuch Flores, Guatemala City
Referee: Jaime Herrera (El Salvador)
10 August 2023
20:00 (18:00 UTC−6)

Jocoro (El Salvador)	0–4	(Costa Rica) Saprissa
	Report	Rodríguez 26', 73'; Brenes 37'; Chirinos 44'

Estadio Olímpico Metropolitano, San Pedro Sula (Honduras)
Referee: Oliver Vergara (Panama)

15 August 2023
18:00 (17:00 UTC−5)

Universitario (Panama)	4–1	(El Salvador) Jocoro
Rose 72', 90+1'; Clement 73'; Rodríguez 88'	Report	Águila 53'

Estadio Universidad Latina, Penonomé
Referee: Bryan López (Guatemala)
15 August 2023
20:00 (18:00 UTC−6)

Cobán Imperial (Guatemala)	0–1	(Costa Rica) Cartaginés
	Report	López 43'

Estadio Doroteo Guamuch Flores, Guatemala City
Referee: Fernando Hernández (Mexico)

22 August 2023
20:00 (18:00 UTC−6)

Cartaginés (Costa Rica)	5–0	(El Salvador) Jocoro
Hernández 11'; Venegas 22'; Guevara 59', 74'; Daly 90+3'	Report

Estadio José Rafael Fello Meza Ivankovich, Cartago
Referee: Pierre-Luc Lauzière (Canada)
23 August 2023
20:00 (19:00 UTC−5)

Universitario (Panama)	0–0	(Costa Rica) Saprissa
	Report

Estadio Universidad Latina, Penonomé
Referee: Ismael Cornejo (El Salvador)

29 August 2023
20:00 (18:00 UTC−6)

Saprissa (Costa Rica)	5–0	(Guatemala) Cobán Imperial
Rodríguez 13'; East 57', 90'; Sinclair 63' (pen.), 81'	Report

Estadio Ricardo Saprissa Aymá, San José
Referee: Rubiel Vazquez (United States)
29 August 2023
20:00 (Note: The Cartaginés v Universitario match, originally scheduled at 18:00 EDT, was re-scheduled to 20:00 EDT in order to allow both matchday 5 matches to be played simultaneously.) (18:00 UTC−6)

Cartaginés (Costa Rica)	2–2	(Panama) Universitario
Hernández 18' (pen.); Pemberton 83'	Report	Sánchez 35', 71'

Estadio José Rafael Fello Meza Ivankovich, Cartago
Referee: Mario Escobar (Guatemala)

=== Group B ===
Pos	Team	Pld	W	D	L	GF	GA	GD	Pts	Qualification	IND	EST	OLI	XEL	FAS
1	(Panama) Independiente	4	3	1	0	11	3	+8	10	Advance to Quarter-finals	—	2–1	—	—	5–0
2	(Nicaragua) Real Estelí	4	3	0	1	5	2	+3	9	Advance to Quarter-finals	—	—	1–0	1–0	—
3	(Honduras) Olimpia	4	2	1	1	7	4	+3	7		1–1	—	—	2–0	—
4	(Guatemala) Xelajú	4	1	0	3	3	7	−4	3		1–3	—	—	—	2–1
5	(El Salvador) FAS	4	0	0	4	3	13	−10	0		—	0–2	2–4	—	—

Source: CONCACAF
1 August 2023
18:00 (16:00 UTC−6)

Real Estelí (Nicaragua)	1–0	(Guatemala) Xelajú
A. Bonilla 19'	Report

Estadio Independencia, Estelí
Referee: Fernando Morón (Panama)
2 August 2023
22:00 (20:00 UTC−6)

Olimpia (Honduras)	1–1	(Panama) Independiente
Benguché 65'	Report	Small 51'

Estadio Nacional Chelato Uclés, Tegucigalpa
Referee: Filiberto Martínez (El Salvador)

8 August 2023
22:00 (20:00 UTC−6)

Real Estelí (Nicaragua)	1–0	(Honduras) Olimpia
Medina 36'	Report

Estadio Independencia, Estelí
Referee: Benjamín Pineda (Costa Rica)
9 August 2023
20:00 (18:00 UTC−6)

Xelajú (Guatemala)	2–1	(El Salvador) FAS
Gutiérrez 25' (pen.); Del Cid 31'	Report	Torres 72'

Estadio Pensativo, Antigua Guatemala
Referee: Ricardo Montero (Costa Rica)

15 August 2023
22:00 (20:00 UTC−6)

FAS (El Salvador)	0–2	(Nicaragua) Real Estelí
	Report	Barrera 19' (pen.), 74'

Estadio Las Delicias, Santa Tecla (Note: FAS played their home matches at Estadio Las Delicias, Santa Tecla (originally scheduled at Estadio Cuscatlán, San Salvador which underwent renovations) instead of their regular stadium Estadio Óscar Quiteño, Santa Ana which did not meet CONCACAF requirements.)
Referee: Raúl Castro (Honduras)
16 August 2023
22:00 (20:00 UTC−6)

Xelajú (Guatemala)	1–3	(Panama) Independiente
Cardona 6'	Report	Serrano 3'; Hernández 63'; Stewart 73'

Estadio Pensativo, Antigua Guatemala
Referee: Said Martínez (Honduras)

22 August 2023
18:00 (17:00 UTC−5)

Independiente (Panama)	2–1	(Nicaragua) Real Estelí
Small 55'; Murillo 74' (pen.)	Report	Bezerra 76'

Estadio Rommel Fernández, Panama City
Referee: David Gómez (Costa Rica)
22 August 2023
22:00 (20:00 UTC−6)

FAS (El Salvador)	2–4	(Honduras) Olimpia
Corea 42'; Plata 49' (pen.)	Report	Benguché 4', 86'; Pineda 37'; López 72'

Estadio Las Delicias, Santa Tecla
Referee: Julio Luna (Guatemala)

29 August 2023
22:00 (20:00 UTC−6)

Olimpia (Honduras)	2–0	(Guatemala) Xelajú
Pinto 44'; Arboleda 54'	Report

Estadio Nacional Chelato Uclés, Tegucigalpa
Referee: Juan Gabriel Calderón (Costa Rica)
29 August 2023
22:00 (Note: The Independiente v FAS match, originally scheduled at 20:00 EDT, was re-scheduled to 22:00 EDT in order to allow both matchday 5 matches to be played simultaneously.) (21:00 UTC−5)

Independiente (Panama)	5–0	(El Salvador) FAS
Ávila 8'; Águila 63'; Small 65'; Serrano 79'; Valverde 88' (pen.)	Report

Estadio Rommel Fernández, Panama City
Referee: Melvin Matamoros (Honduras)

=== Group C ===
Pos	Team	Pld	W	D	L	GF	GA	GD	Pts	Qualification	HER	COM	RES	ÁGU	DIR
1	(Costa Rica) Herediano	4	3	1	0	8	4	+4	10	Advance to Quarter-finals	—	—	3–2	2–0	—
2	(Guatemala) Comunicaciones	4	3	0	1	9	4	+5	9	Advance to Quarter-finals	1–2	—	3–1	—	—
3	(Honduras) Real España	4	1	1	2	6	6	0	4		—	—	—	3–0	0–0
4	(El Salvador) Águila	4	1	0	3	2	9	−7	3		—	1–4	—	—	1–0
5	(Nicaragua) Diriangén	4	0	2	2	1	3	−2	2		1–1	0–1	—	—	—

Source: CONCACAF
2 August 2023
20:00 (18:00 UTC−6)

Comunicaciones (Guatemala)	3–1	(Honduras) Real España
Aparicio 18'; López 64'; González 89'	Report	Carter 33'

Estadio Doroteo Guamuch Flores, Guatemala City
Referee: Joseph Dickerson (United States)
3 August 2023
20:00 (18:00 UTC−6)

Diriangén (Nicaragua)	1–1	(Costa Rica) Herediano
Copete 15'	Report	Faerron 52'

Estadio Cacique Diriangén, Diriamba
Referee: Nelson Salgado (Honduras)

9 August 2023
18:00 (16:00 UTC−6)

Herediano (Costa Rica)	2–0	(El Salvador) Águila
Godínez 22', 84'	Report

Estadio Alejandro Morera Soto, Alajuela
Referee: Marco Ortiz (Mexico)
10 August 2023
22:00 (20:00 UTC−6)

Diriangén (Nicaragua)	0–1	(Guatemala) Comunicaciones
	Report	Aguilar 40'

Estadio Cacique Diriangén, Diriamba
Referee: Adonai Escobedo (Mexico)

16 August 2023
20:00 (18:00 UTC−6)

Herediano (Costa Rica)	3–2	(Honduras) Real España
Bran 43', 70'; R. Araya 45'	Report	Vuelto 35'; Carter 62'

Estadio Nacional, San José
Referee: Mario Escobar (Guatemala)
17 August 2023
20:00 (18:00 UTC−6)

Águila (El Salvador)	1–0	(Nicaragua) Diriangén
Cerén 90+2'	Report

Estadio Las Delicias, Santa Tecla (Note: Águila played their home matches at Estadio Las Delicias, Santa Tecla (originally scheduled at Estadio Cuscatlán, San Salvador which underwent renovations) instead of their regular stadium Estadio Juan Francisco Barraza, San Miguel which did not meet CONCACAF requirements.)
Referee: Sergio Reyna (Guatemala)

23 August 2023
22:00 (20:00 UTC−6)

Águila (El Salvador)	1–4	(Guatemala) Comunicaciones
Salazar 45+1'	Report	Aparicio 14'; Corena 27', 71'; García 82'

Estadio Las Delicias, Santa Tecla
Referee: Keylor Herrera (Costa Rica)
24 August 2023
22:00 (20:00 UTC−6)

Real España (Honduras)	0–0	(Nicaragua) Diriangén
	Report

Estadio Olímpico Metropolitano, San Pedro Sula
Referee: Benjampin Pineda (Costa Rica)

30 August 2023
20:00 (18:00 UTC−6)

Real España (Honduras)	3–0	(El Salvador) Águila
Rocca 48', 64', 70'	Report

Estadio Olímpico Metropolitano, San Pedro Sula
Referee: Bryan López (Guatemala)
30 August 2023
22:00 (20:00 UTC−6)

Comunicaciones (Guatemala)	1–2	(Costa Rica) Herediano
Aguilar 22'	Report	Rojas 55'; D. Araya 74'

Estadio Doroteo Guamuch Flores, Guatemala City
Referee: Said Martínez (Honduras)

=== Group D ===
Pos	Team	Pld	W	D	L	GF	GA	GD	Pts	Qualification	ALA	MOT	SSM	OLA	VER
1	(Costa Rica) Alajuelense	4	4	0	0	10	1	+9	12	Advance to Quarter-finals	—	5–1	—	1–0	—
2	(Honduras) Motagua	4	3	0	1	9	5	+4	9	Advance to Quarter-finals	—	—	2–0	1–0	—
3	(Panama) Sporting San Miguelito	4	2	0	2	6	3	+3	6		0–1	—	—	—	4–0
4	(Honduras) Olancho	4	1	0	3	3	6	−3	3		—	—	0–2	—	3–2
5	(Belize) Verdes	4	0	0	4	2	15	−13	0		0–3	0–5	—	—	—

Source: CONCACAF
1 August 2023
22:00 (20:00 UTC−6)

Alajuelense (Costa Rica)	1–0	(Honduras) Olancho
Suárez 61'	Report

Estadio Alejandro Morera Soto, Alajuela
Referee: Ignacio Fuentes (Guatemala)
2 August 2023
18:00 (16:00 UTC−6)

Verdes (Belize)	0–5	(Honduras) Motagua
	Report	Auzmendi 44' (pen.), 47', 56'; López 78'; C. Mejía 85'

FFB Stadium, Belmopan
Referee: Josué Ugalde (Costa Rica)

8 August 2023
18:00 (16:00 UTC−6)

Verdes (Belize)	0–3	(Costa Rica) Alajuelense
	Report	Barrantes 41'; Góndola 54'; Suárez 88'

FFB Stadium, Belmopan
Referee: Melvin Matamoros (Honduras)
9 August 2023
22:00 (20:00 UTC−6)

Motagua (Honduras)	2–0	(Panama) Sporting San Miguelito
Y. Mejía 21', 60'	Report

Estadio Nacional Chelato Uclés, Tegucigalpa
Referee: Julio Luna (Guatemala)

16 August 2023
18:45 (Note: The Sporting San Miguelito vs Verdes match, originally scheduled at 18:00 EDT, was delayed until 18:45 EDT due to adverse weather conditions (thunderstorm).) (17:45 UTC−5)

Sporting San Miguelito (Panama)	4–0	(Belize) Verdes
Torres 14' (pen.); E. Gómez 53'; Hendricks 61'; Corpas 81'	Report

Estadio Rommel Fernández, Panama City
Referee: Juan Gabriel Calderón (Costa Rica)
17 August 2023
22:00 (20:00 UTC−6)

Motagua (Honduras)	1–0	(Honduras) Olancho
Y. Mejía 54'	Report

Estadio Nacional Chelato Uclés, Tegucigalpa
Referee: Randy Encarnación (Dominican Republic)

23 August 2023
18:00 (16:00 UTC−6)

Olancho (Honduras)	3–2	(Belize) Verdes
Fernández 17'; Almendárez 39'; Obando 90+4'	Report	Burgos 6'; López 68'

Estadio Nacional Chelato Uclés, Tegucigalpa
Referee: Oliver Vergara (Panama)
24 August 2023
20:00 (19:00 UTC−5)

Sporting San Miguelito (Panama)	0–1	(Costa Rica) Alajuelense
	Report	A. López 90+2'

Estadio Rommel Fernández, Panama City
Referee: Selvin Brown (Honduras)

31 August 2023
20:00 (18:00 UTC−6)

Olancho (Honduras)	0–2	(Panama) Sporting San Miguelito
	Report	Torres 15'; Corpas 62'

Estadio Nacional Chelato Uclés, Tegucigalpa
Referee: Walter López (Guatemala)
31 August 2023
22:00 (20:00 UTC−6)

Alajuelense (Costa Rica)	5–1	(Honduras) Motagua
Navarro 5', 29'; Rodríguez 38'; Barrantes 65'; Venegas 90+2'	Report	Auzmendi 15'

Estadio Alejandro Morera Soto, Alajuela
Referee: Iván Barton (El Salvador)
