= 2022 Liga Panameña de Fútbol =

Football league season

The 2022 Liga Panameña de Fútbol or 2022 Liga LPF (known as the Liga LPF Tigo for sponsorship reasons) was the 35th season of the Liga Panameña de Fútbol (LPF), the top-flight football league in Panama, and the third under the management of the Liga Panameña de Fútbol. The season began on 4 February 2022, when the Apertura tournament started, and ended on 12 November 2022 with the Clausura tournament Final.

The season was originally scheduled to start on 21 January 2022, but the date was pushed back due to the detection of several COVID-19 cases in the participating clubs.

A total of twelve teams competed throughout the entire season, which was divided into two championships: Torneo Apertura and Torneo Clausura, each of them being an independent championship and crowning its own champion.

== Competition format ==
Same as previous years, the season was divided into two championships: Torneo Apertura and Torneo Clausura. Both Apertura and Clausura were played under the same format which consisted in a Classification stage, where the 12 teams were geographically divided into the Eastern and Western Conferences (6 teams per conference); Play-offs, Semifinals and Final.

Within each conference, teams played each other twice on a double round-robin format (home and away). In addition, each team played one game against all the 6 teams in the opposite conference for a total of 16 games per team in the classification stage. Winners of each conference qualified directly to the semi-finals, whilst the second and third placed teams advanced to the play-offs stage.

The Play-offs stage was played on a single-leg format between the second placed team of each conference against the third placed team of the opposite conference, with the second placed teams hosting the matches. Winners of play-offs advanced to semi-finals to play against the first placed team of each conference on a home-and-away two-legged basis. Winners of the semifinals played the final on a single-leg match at a venue and date determined by the LFP, with highest team ranked in the classification stage acting as the "home" team for "administrative purposes.

== Teams ==
A total of 12 teams took part in this season; the same ones that played in the previous 2021 season, including San Francisco, which finished in the last place (12th) on the aggregate table of the 2021 season, which meant its relegation to the 2022 Liga Prom season. However, San Francisco was able to stay in the Liga LPF, subject to the payment of a financial penalty, since the champions and runners-up of the 2021 Liga Prom (Alianza FC II and Panamá Oeste) did not meet the requirements of the Liga Panameña de Fútbol to play in the 2022 Liga LPF.

=== Stadia and locations ===
Team	City	Stadium	Capacity
Eastern Conference
Alianza	Panama City	Javier Cruz	700
Árabe Unido	Colón	Armando Dely Valdés	4,000
Plaza Amador	Panama City	Rommel Fernandez	32,000
Plaza Amador	Panama City	Javier Cruz	700
Potros del Este	Panama City	Hacienda Country Club	100
Sporting San Miguelito	San Miguelito	Los Andes	1,450
Tauro	Panama City	Rommel Fernandez	32,000
Western Conference
Atlético Chiriquí	David	San Cristóbal	2,890
Independiente	La Chorrera	Agustín Sánchez	3,040
Herrera	Llano Bonito	Los Milagros	1,000
San Francisco	La Chorrera	Agustín Sánchez	3,040
Veraguas United	Atalaya	Atalaya	500
Universitario	Penonomé	Virgilio Tejeira	900

=== Personnel and kits ===
Team	Head coach	Captain	Kit manufacturer	Shirt sponsor(s)
Alianza	(Colombia) Jair Palacios	(Panama) Kevin Melgar	Keuka	Clinilab Panamá
Árabe Unido	(Panama) Julio Dely Valdés	(Panama) Abdiel Macea	Kelme	BetCha.pa, AguAseo, Kendall Motor Oil
Atlético Chiriquí	(Colombia) Dayron Pérez	(Panama) Miguel Saavedra	Kelme	
Herrera	(Venezuela) Alberto Valencia	(Panama) Santiago Cedeño	Strik3r	Varela Hermanos S.A., Betcris, Gran Hotel Azuero, Hertz
Independiente	(Panama) Franklin Narváez	(Panama) César Samudio	Fila	Altos De La Pradera
Plaza Amador	(Panama) Jorge Dely Valdés	(Panama) Ricardo Buitrago	Puma	Sportium, SPARK
Potros del Este	(Venezuela) Daniel Blanco	(Panama) Edgar Góndola	Luanvi	UniWorld Air Cargo
San Francisco	(Panama) Gary Stempel	(Panama) Francisco Palacios	Strik3r	Betcha.pa
Sporting San Miguelito	(Brazil) Felipe Borowsky	(Panama) Adolfo Machado	Spirits	Teletón 20-30
Tauro	(Venezuela) Francisco Perlo	(Panama) Edwin Aguilar	Patrick	Betcha.pa, Universidad del Istmo, KFC
Universitario	(Venezuela) Julio Infante	(Panama) Manuel Torres	FB Sports	Latin University of Panama
Veraguas United	(Argentina) Villi Trebino	(Panama) Rolando Algandona	Strik3r	Betcris, Super Carnes, La Parmigiana

=== Managerial changes ===
Team	Outgoing manager	Manner of departure	Date of vacancy	Position in table	Incoming manager	Date of appointment
Torneo Apertura
San Francisco	(Panama) Jorge Santos	End of caretaker spell	20 November 2021	Pre-season	(Colombia) Gonzalo Soto (Note: Juan Carlos Cubilla was the caretaker manager for the Torneo Apertura 3rd round match against Atlético Chiriquí.)	19 January 2022
Sporting San Miguelito	(Uruguay) Saúl Maldonado	Mutual agreement	22 November 2021	Pre-season	(Brazil) Felipe Borowsky	26 November 2021
Veraguas United	(Spain) Isaac Jové	End of contract	4 December 2021	Pre-season	(Panama) José Anthony Torres (Note: Caretaker manager.)	January 2022
Independiente	(Venezuela) Francisco Perlo	Signed by Academia Puerto Cabello	8 December 2021	Pre-season	(Venezuela) Iván Guerra	15 December 2021
Árabe Unido	(Colombia) Sergio Angulo	End of contract	22 December 2021	Pre-season	(Panama) Julio Dely Valdés	22 December 2021
Tauro	(Venezuela) Kike García	Mutual agreement	29 December 2021	Pre-season	(Panama) Rolando Palma	30 December 2021
Universitario	(Panama) Gary Stempel	Resigned	16 February 2022	6th, WC	(Panama) Alberto Blanco	17 February 2022
Veraguas United	(Panama) José Anthony Torres	End of caretaker spell	21 March 2022	5th, WC	(Argentina) Daniel Lanata	22 March 2022
Torneo Clausura
Veraguas United	(Argentina) Daniel Lanata	End of contract	7 May 2022	Pre-season	(Paraguay) Héctor Blanco	July 2022
Independiente	(Venezuela) Iván Guerra	End of contract	18 May 2022	Pre-season	(Panama) Franklin Narváez	23 May 2022
Herrera	(Venezuela) Julio Infante	Sacked	20 May 2022	Pre-season	(Spain) Emmanuel Calleja	23 May 2022
Universitario	(Panama) Alberto Blanco	End of contract	20 May 2022	Pre-season	(Venezuela) Julio Infante	23 June 2022
Atlético Chiriquí	(Venezuela) Alberto Valencia	End of contract	21 May 2022	Pre-season	(Colombia) Dayron Pérez	July 2022
Tauro	(Panama) Rolando Palma	Sacked	11 August 2022	6th, EC	(Venezuela) Francisco Perlo (Note: Manuel Valencia was the caretaker manager for the Torneo Clausura 5th round match against Árabe Unido.)	13 August 2022
San Francisco	(Colombia) Gonzalo Soto	Mutual agreement	28 August 2022	5th, WC	(Panama) Gary Stempel	29 August 2022
Veraguas United	(Paraguay) Héctor Blanco	Resigned	20 September 2022	5th, WC	(Argentina) Villi Trebino	20 September 2022
Herrera	(Spain) Emmanuel Calleja	Sacked	21 September 2022	6th, WC	(Venezuela) Alberto Valencia (Note: Miguel Corral was the caretaker manager for the Torneo Clausura 11th and 12th round match against Árabe Unido and Atlético Chiriquí.)	30 September 2022

== Torneo Apertura ==
The Torneo Apertura began on 4 February and ended on 28 May with the final.

=== Classification stage ===
==== Eastern Conference ====
Pos	Team	Pld	W	D	L	GF	GA	GD	Pts	Qualification
1	Sporting San Miguelito	16	9	6	1	24	11	+13	33	Advance to Semi-finals
2	Alianza	16	8	5	3	15	7	+8	29	Advance to Play-offs
3	Tauro	16	8	3	5	20	11	+9	27	Advance to Play-offs
4	Plaza Amador	16	6	8	2	26	18	+8	26	
5	Potros del Este	16	3	7	6	15	23	−8	16	
6	Árabe Unido	16	1	7	8	4	15	−11	10	

Source: FPF

==== Western Conference ====
Pos	Team	Pld	W	D	L	GF	GA	GD	Pts	Qualification
1	Atlético Chiriquí	16	8	4	4	21	20	+1	28	Advance to Semi-finals
2	Independiente	16	8	2	6	23	20	+3	26	Advance to Play-offs
3	Herrera	16	4	9	3	20	15	+5	21	Advance to Play-offs
4	San Francisco	16	5	5	6	18	14	+4	20	
5	Veraguas United	16	2	6	8	14	27	−13	12	
6	Universitario	16	2	2	12	8	28	−20	8	

Source: FPF

==== Results ====
Home \ Away	ALI	DAU	ACH	HER	IND	PLA	PDE	SFR	SSM	TAU	CDU	VER
Alianza	—	2–0	—	—	—	0–0	0–0	2–1	0–1	0–1	2–0	2–0
Árabe Unido	0–1	—	—	0–0	—	0–2	2–1	—	0–0	0–0	0–1	0–0
Atlético Chiriquí	1–1	1–0	—	0–0	0–3	—	—	2–1	—	1–0	1–0	2–1
Herrera	0–0	—	0–2	—	4–0	—	1–2	0–0	—	0–0	3–1	2–0
Independiente	1–2	1–0	2–1	1–2	—	—	0–0	1–4	—	—	1–0	3–1
Plaza Amador	0–0	2–2	2–1	1–1	0–1	—	4–3	—	1–1	1–0	—	—
Potros del Este	1–2	0–0	2–2	—	—	1–4	—	0–0	0–3	0–2	2–0	—
San Francisco	—	0–0	2–2	3–1	2–0	2–2	—	—	0–1	—	0–1	0–1
Sporting San Miguelito	1–0	1–0	4–1	1–1	2–1	1–1	1–1	—	—	0–1	—	—
Tauro	0–1	3–0	—	—	1–2	3–1	0–1	1–0	3–3	—	—	4–1
Universitario	—	—	0–1	2–2	0–5	1–4	—	0–1	0–2	0–1	—	2–2
Veraguas United	—	—	1–3	2–2	1–1	1–1	1–1	0–2	1–2	—	1–0	—

Source: Soccerway
Legend: Blue = home team win; Yellow = draw; Red = away team win.

=== Bracket ===
Play-offs
WC2	Independiente	1
EC3	Tauro (a.e.t.)	2
EC2	Alianza	2
WC3	Herrera	0

Semi-finals
EC3	Tauro	1	0	1
EC1	Sporting San Miguelito	2	0	2
EC2	Alianza	1	1	2
WC1	Atlético Chiriquí	0	1	1

Final
EC1	Sporting San Miguelito	1
EC2	Alianza	2

=== Play-offs ===
10 May 2022
20:00

Alianza	2–0	Herrera
Medina 50'; Chiari 90+4'	Report

Estadio Rommel Fernández, Panama City
Referee: Jorge Negron Marciales

11 May 2022
20:10

Independiente	1–2 (a.e.t.)	Tauro
Ávila 15'	Report	McKenzie 6'; González 114'

Estadio Agustín Sánchez, La Chorrera
Referee: Jorge Carrasco

=== Semi-finals ===
14 May 2022
20:00

Alianza	1–0	Atlético Chiriquí
Verley 34'	Report

Estadio Rommel Fernández, Panama City
Referee: Fernando Morón
21 May 2022
20:00

Atlético Chiriquí	1–1	Alianza
Aparicio 90+9'	Report	Verley 88'

Estadio San Cristóbal, David
Referee: Jafeth Perea

Alianza won 2–1 on aggregate and advanced to the final.

15 May 2022
18:30

Tauro	1–2	Sporting San Miguelito
Chará 60'	Report	Zúñiga 27', 54'

Estadio Rommel Fernández, Panama City
Referee: Noriel Reina
22 May 2022
18:00

Sporting San Miguelito	0–0	Tauro
	Report

Estadio Los Andes, San Miguelito
Referee: Jorge Negron Marciales

Sporting San Miguelito won 2–1 on aggregate and advanced to the final.

=== FInal ===
28 May 2022
19:00

Sporting San Miguelito	1–2	Alianza
Peralta 45+2'	Report	Chiari 25', 78'

Estadio Rommel Fernández, Panama City
Attendance: 10,536
Referee: Fernando Morón

Torneo Apertura 2022 winners:

1st title

=== Top goalscorers ===
Players sorted first by goals scored, then by last name.

Rank	Player	Club	Goals
1	(Panama) Edgar Aparicio	Atlético Chiriquí	7
1	(Panama) Víctor Ávila	Independiente	7
1	(Panama) Ricardo Buitrago	Plaza Amador	7
4	(Panama) Luis Zúñiga	Sporting San Miguelito	6
4	(Colombia) José Florez	Atlético Chiriquí	6
4	(Panama) Sergio Cunningham	Herrera	6
7	(Panama) Ricardo Clarke	Plaza Amador	5
7	(Panama) Alexis Corpas	Sporting San Miguelito	5
7	(Panama) César Medina	Alianza	5
7	(Panama) Ángel Orelien	Plaza Amador	5
7	(Panama) Omar Valencia	Tauro	5

== Torneo Clausura ==
The Torneo Clausura began on 22 July and ended on 12 November with the final.

=== Classification stage ===
==== Eastern Conference ====
Pos	Team	Pld	W	D	L	GF	GA	GD	Pts	Qualification
1	Árabe Unido	16	7	4	5	20	13	+7	25	Advance to Semi-finals
2	Sporting San Miguelito	16	6	7	3	21	16	+5	25	Advance to Play-offs
3	Plaza Amador	16	6	6	4	18	17	+1	24	Advance to Play-offs
4	Alianza	16	7	3	6	15	15	0	24	
5	Tauro	16	7	3	6	15	15	0	24	
6	Potros del Este	16	6	4	6	25	21	+4	22	

Source: FPF

==== Western Conference ====
Pos	Team	Pld	W	D	L	GF	GA	GD	Pts	Qualification
1	Independiente	16	10	2	4	26	11	+15	32	Advance to Semi-finals
2	Universitario	16	7	5	4	25	20	+5	26	Advance to Play-offs
3	San Francisco	16	5	3	8	20	18	+2	18	Advance to Play-offs
4	Veraguas United	16	3	6	7	17	20	−3	15	
5	Herrera	16	2	7	7	10	28	−18	13	
6	Atlético Chiriquí	16	1	8	7	7	25	−18	11	

Source: FPF

==== Results ====
Home \ Away	ALI	DAU	ACH	HER	IND	PLA	PDE	SFR	SSM	TAU	CDU	VER
Alianza	—	0–3	4–0	1–1	0–1	1–3	1–0	—	1–0	0–0	—	—
Árabe Unido	3–0	—	2–0	—	0–0	1–2	2–1	2–0	1–1	0–1	—	—
Atlético Chiriquí	—	—	—	0–0	0–2	1–2	1–1	0–4	0–0	—	3–2	1–1
Herrera	—	2–1	0–0	—	0–5	0–1	—	0–2	0–0	—	2–2	1–1
Independiente	—	—	3–0	2–3	—	1–0	—	2–0	0–2	2–0	3–1	0–0
Plaza Amador	1–1	2–2	—	—	—	—	0–3	1–2	1–1	1–0	1–2	1–0
Potros del Este	2–1	2–0	—	4–0	3–1	1–1	—	—	1–3	0–2	—	1–1
San Francisco	0–1	—	0–0	5–0	0–2	—	2–0	—	—	1–2	1–1	1–1
Sporting San Miguelito	0–1	0–0	—	—	—	1–1	3–2	2–1	—	3–1	2–2	3–1
Tauro	0–2	1–0	0–0	2–1	—	0–0	1–2	—	2–0	—	1–2	—
Universitario	1–0	1–2	0–0	2–0	0–2	—	2–2	1–0	—	—	—	3–1
Veraguas United	0–1	0–1	4–1	0–0	2–0	—	—	3–1	—	1–2	0–3	—

Source: Soccerway
Legend: Blue = home team win; Yellow = draw; Red = away team win.

=== Bracket ===
Play-offs
EC2	Sporting San Miguelito	2
WC3	San Francisco	0
WC2	Universitario	1
EC3	Plaza Amador	0

Semi-finals
EC2	Sporting San Miguelito	1	0	1
WC1	Independiente	1	1	2
WC2	Universitario	1	0	1
EC1	Árabe Unido	0	0	0

Final
WC1	Independiente (a.e.t.)	2
WC2	Universitario	1

=== Play-offs ===
25 October 2022
20:00

Sporting San Miguelito	2–0	San Francisco
Oliveira 29' (pen.); Sánchez 44'	Report

Estadio Los Andes, San Miguelito
Referee: Jorge Negron Marciales

26 October 2022
20:o0

Universitario	1–0	Plaza Amador
Carmona 42'	Report

Estadio Universidad Latina, Penonomé
Referee: Jafeth Perea

=== Semi-finals ===
29 October 2022
19:00

Sporting San Miguelito	1–1	Independiente
Sánchez 73'	Report	Palacios 13'

Estadio Los Andes, San Miguelito
Referee: José Carrasco
5 November 2022
19:00

Independiente	1–0	Sporting San Miguelito
Caicedo 46'	Report

Estadio Agustín Sánchez, La Chorrera

Independiente won 2–1 on aggregate and advanced to the final.

30 October 2022
18:00

Universitario	1–0	Árabe Unido
Cox 61'	Report

Estadio Universidad Latina, Penonomé
Referee: Oliver Vergara
6 November 2022
15:00

Árabe Unido	0–0	Universitario
	Report

Estadio Armando Dely Valdés, Colón
Referee: Jafeth Perea

Universitario won 1–0 on aggregate and advanced to the final.

=== Final ===
12 November 2022
19:00

Independiente	2–1 (a.e.t.)	Universitario
Hernández 55'; Ávila 118'	Report	Cox 7'

Estadio Rommel Fernández, Panama City
Referee: Jafeth Perea

Torneo Clausura 2022 winners:

4th title

=== Top goalscorers ===
Players sorted first by goals scored, then by last name.

Rank	Player	Club	Goals
1	(Panama) Joseph Cox	Universitario	13
2	(Panama) Jorlian Sánchez	Sporting San Miguelito	9
3	(Panama) Yoameth Murillo	Potros del Este	7
4	(Brazil) Dwann Oliveira	Sporting San Miguelito	6
4	(Panama) César Yanis	Potros del Este	6
6	(Panama) Víctor Ávila	Árabe Unido	5
6	(Panama) Alexis Cundumi	Veraguas United	5
8	(Panama) Gabriel Brown	Árabe Unido	4
8	(Panama) Mario Carmona	Universitario	4
8	(Panama) Gilberto Hernández	Independiente	4
8	(Panama) Jhamal Rodríguez	San Francisco	4
8	(Panama) Ángel Sánchez	Herrera	4
