= 2018–19 Liga Panameña de Fútbol =

Liga Panameña de Fútbol
- Season: 2018–19
- Champions: Apertura: Tauro; Clausura: Independiente
- Relegated: Santa Gema
- CONCACAF League: Tauro; Independiente; San Francisco
- Matches: 65
- Goals: 134 (2.06 per match)
- Biggest home win: Plaza Amador 3-0 Chorrillo; Chorrillo 3-0 Atletico Veraguense
- Highest scoring: San Francisco 2-3 Atletico Veraguense

The 2018–19 Liga Panameña de Fútbol (also known as the Liga Cable Onda) was the 28th season of the Liga Panameña de Fútbol, the top-flight football league in Panama. The season began on 17 July 2017 and was scheduled to end in May 2018. Ten teams competed throughout the entire season.

== Teams ==
Chorrillo formed with Deportivo Centenario de Coclé and la Universidad Latina de Panamá to become Unión Deportivo Universitario therefore there was no need for a relegation. Taking their place for this season are the overall champions of last season's Liga Nacional de Ascenso, Costa del Este F.C.

Club	Home city	Stadium
Alianza	Panama City	Cancha de Entrenamiento Luis Tapia
Árabe Unido	Colón	Armando Dely Valdes
Unión Deportivo Universitario	Santiago de Veraguas	Aristocles "Toco" Castillo
Costa del Este F.C.	Panama City	Estadio Maracaná
Independiente	La Chorrera	Estadio Maracaná
Plaza Amador	Panama City	Estadio Maracaná
San Francisco	La Chorrera	Estadio Agustín Sánchez
Santa Gema	Arraiján	Estadio Agustín Sánchez
Sporting San Miguelito	San Miguelito	Cancha de Entrenamiento Luis Tapia
Tauro	Panama City	Estadio Rommel Fernandez

== Managerial changes ==
=== Before the start of the season ===
Team	Outgoing manager	Manner of departure	Date of vacancy	Replaced by	Date of appointment	Position in table
Plaza Amador	(Spain) Juan Carlos García	Sacked	May 2018	(Panama) Jorge Santos	May 2018	th (TBD)
Tauro FC	(Colombia) Sergio Angulo	Contract Finished	June 2018	(Spain) Juan Carlos García	June 2018	th (TBD)
Arabe Unido	(Colombia) Sergio Guzman	Contract Finished	June 2018	(Colombia) Carlos Ruiz	June 2018	th (TBD)

=== During the Apertura season ===
Team	Outgoing manager	Manner of departure	Date of vacancy	Replaced by	Date of appointment	Position in table
Tauro F.C.	(Spain) Juan Carlos García	Sacked	September 2018	(Uruguay) Saúl Maldonado	September 2018	10th (Apertura 2017)
Sporting San Miguelito	(Panama) Noel Gutierrez	Mutual Agreement	September 2018	(Panama) Gustavo Avila	September 2018	9th (Apertura 2017)
San Francisco FC	(Colombia) Andres Dominguez	Mutual Agreement	September 2018	(Colombia) Sergio Angulo	September 2018	9th (Apertura 2017)
Arabe Unidos	(Colombia) Carlos Ruiz	Sacked	September 2018	(Colombia) José 'Chicho' Pérez	September 2018	th (Apertura 2017)
UD Universitario	(Colombia) Óscar Upegui	Sacked	September 2018	(Panama) Julio Medina	September 2018	th (Apertura 2017)

=== Between Apertura and Clausura seasons ===
Team	Outgoing manager	Manner of departure	Date of vacancy	Replaced by	Date of appointment	Position in table
Independiente FC	(Panama) Donaldo Gonzales	Sacked	December 2018	(Venezuela) Francisco Perlo	December 2018	9th (Apertura 2018)
Plaza Amador	(Panama) Jorge Santos	Sacked	December 2018	(Colombia) Javier Alvarez	December 2018	th (Apertura 2018)
Alianza	(Colombia) Jair Palacios	Sacked	December 2018	(Colombia) Alberto Nino Valencia	December 2018	th (Apertura 2018)
CD Universitario	(Panama) Julio Medina	Sacked	December 2018	(Argentina) Gustavo Onaindia	December 2018	th (Apertura 2018)
San Francisco FC	(Colombia) Sergio Angulo	Contract not renewed	December 2018	(Colombia) Gonzalo Soto	December 2018	th (Apertura 2018)
Costa Del Este FC	(Venezuela) Angel Sanchez	Contract finished	December 2018	(Costa Rica) Carlos Pérez Porras	December 2018	th (Apertura 2018)
Sporting San Miguelito	(Panama) Gustavo Avila	Sacked	December 2018	(Colombia) Jair Palacios	December 2018	th (Pre Season)

=== During the Clausura season ===
Team	Outgoing manager	Manner of departure	Date of vacancy	Replaced by	Date of appointment	Position in table
Costa Del Este FC	(Costa Rica) Carlos Pérez Porras	Sacked	February 2019	(Panama) Juan Carlos Fuentes	February 2019	10th (Clausura 2019)
Santa Gema	(Panama) Jose Torres	Sacked	March 2019	(Panama) Carlos Rivera	March 2019	10th (Clausura 2019)
CD Universitario	(Argentina) Gustavo Onaindia	Sacked	March 2019	(Panama) Donaldo Gonzales	March 2019	10th (Clausura 2019)
Alianza	(Colombia) Alberto Nino Valencia	Sacked	March 2019	(Panama) Celio Garces	March 2019	10th (Clausura 2019)

== Apertura ==
=== Personnel and sponsoring (2018 Apertura) ===
Team	Chairman	Head coach	Kitmaker	Shirt sponsor
Alianza	TBD	(Colombia) Jair Palacios	Keuka	Balboa
Árabe Unido	TBD	(Colombia) Carlos Ruiz	Kelme	Pizza Hut, Panama Colon, Aguaseo
CD Universitario	TBD	(Colombia) Óscar Upegui	Lotto	McDonald's
Costa del Este F.C.		(Venezuela) Angel Sanchez	Adidas	McDonald's, Cremoso
Independiente		(Panama) Donaldo Gonzales	Everlast	Cemento Interoceanico, ECO Moda
Plaza Amador	TBD	(Panama) Jorge Santos	Umbro	Páguela Facil, Frosquito, Mercana
Santa Gema		(Panama) Mario Anthony "Chalate" Torres	Kelme	ShowPro, PSA Panama
San Francisco	Julio Quijano	(Colombia) Andrés Domínguez	Puma	KFC, Banco General
Sporting San Miguelito	TBD	(Colombia) Noel Gutierrez	Keuka	Los Andes, URBE, pío Pío
Tauro	TBD	(Spain) Juan Carlos García	Patrick	Touritos, Argos, Caja de Ahorros

=== Standings ===
Pos	Team	Pld	W	D	L	GF	GA	GD	Pts	Qualification or relegation
1	Costa del Este	18	7	8	3	18	12	+6	29	Advance to Playoffs (Semifinals)
2	Árabe Unido	18	8	4	6	18	17	+1	28	Advance to Playoffs (Semifinals)
3	Tauro	18	7	6	5	33	20	+13	27	Advance to Playoffs (Quarterfinals)
4	Plaza Amador	18	6	7	5	15	14	+1	25	Advance to Playoffs (Quarterfinals)
5	San Francisco	18	7	4	7	19	19	0	25	Advance to Playoffs (Quarterfinals)
6	Alianza	18	5	8	5	16	17	−1	23	Advance to Playoffs (Quarterfinals)
7	Santa Gema	18	5	7	6	20	24	−4	22	
8	Universitario	18	5	6	7	18	23	−5	21	
9	Independiente	18	4	8	6	20	22	−2	20	
10	Sporting San Miguelito	18	3	8	7	17	26	−9	17	

Source: Soccerway
Rules for classification: 1) points; 2) goal difference; 3) number of goals scored.

=== Results ===
Home \ Away	ALI	ARA	CDE	IND	PLA	SFR	SGE	SSM	TAU	UNI
Alianza	—	0–2	1–0	2–1	0–0	1–0	2–2	1–1	0–1	2–0
Árabe Unido	1–0	—	0–0	2–0	0–1	2–1	2–2	1–1	0–0	1–0
Costa del Este	2–2	2–0	—	3–0	1–0	0–0	0–1	2–1	0–0	0–3
Independiente	0–0	2–0	0–0	—	1–2	1–1	1–1	1–1	2–2	2–2
Plaza Amador	1–1	1–3	1–1	1–0	—	0–1	1–1	0–1	2–1	1–1
San Francisco	1–0	0–1	1–2	1–2	1–0	—	1–2	2–2	2–3	1–1
Santa Gema	2–0	1–2	1–2	0–2	0–2	0–1	—	1–1	2–1	2–1
Sporting San Miguelito	0–1	1–0	0–0	1–1	1–2	1–2	1–1	—	1–3	1–3
Tauro	2–2	4–1	1–1	1–3	0–0	1–2	3–0	5–0	—	1–2
Universitario	1–1	1–0	0–2	2–1	0–0	0–1	1–1	0–2	0–4	—

Updated to match(es) played on completed. Source: Soccerway
Legend: Blue = home team win; Yellow = draw; Red = away team win.
For upcoming matches, an "a" indicates there is an article about the rivalry between the two participants.

=== Playoffs ===
==== Quarterfinals ====
November 15, 2018
12:00

Plaza Amador	1 – 2	San Francisco
Jose Murillo 90'		Guido Rouse 14'; Jhamal Rodriguez 78'

Nuevo Estadio Maracaná de Panamá, Panama City
Referee: Victor Rios

November 15, 2018
13:00

Tauro	1 – 0	Alianza
Enrico Small 88'		None

Estadio Rommel Fernández Gutiérrez
Referee: Jose Kellys

==== Semifinals ====
Team 1	Agg.	Team 2	1st leg	2nd leg
Árabe Unido	1 – 3	Tauro	0 – 2	1 – 1
Costa del Este	4 – 3	San Francisco	3 – 1	0 – 0

===== First leg =====
November 18, 2018
8:00pm

Tauro	2 – 0	Árabe Unido
Enrico Small 34'; Gustavo Chará 93'		None

Estadio Rommel Fernández Gutiérrez, Panama City

November 19, 2018
6:00pm

San Francisco	1 – 3	Costa del Este F.C.
Edson Samms 26'		Ernesto Sinclair 11' 22' 45'

Estadio Agustín Muquita Sánchez, La Chorrera

===== Second leg =====
November 24, 2018
8:00pm

Árabe Unido	1 – 1	Tauro
Edwin Aguilar 37'		Blas Perez 92'

Estadio Armando Dely Valdés, Colón

Tauro won 3-1 on aggregate.

November 25, 2018
7:00pm

Costa del Este F.C.	1 – 2	San Francisco
Ernesto Sinclair 55'		Ervin Zorrila 47'; Guido Rouse 65'

Estadio Rommel Fernandez Gutiérrez, Panama City

Costa del Este won 4-3 on aggregate.

==== Final ====
December 1, 2018
20:00 UTC−6

Costa del Este	1-2	Tauro
Edwin Aguilar own 15'	[ ]	Edwin Aguilar 3'; Jesus Gonzales 119'

Estadio Rommel Fernández
Attendance: TBD
Referee: John Pitti

== Clausura ==
=== Personnel and sponsoring (2019 Clausura) ===
Team	Chairman	Head coach	Kitmaker	Shirt sponsor
Alianza	TBD	(Panama) Celio Garces	Keuka	Cemento Interoceanico
Árabe Unido	TBD	(Colombia) José 'Chicho' Pérez	Kelme	Pizza Hut
Unión Deportivo Universitario	TBD	(Panama) Donaldo Gonzales	Keuka	EGS, NCO
Costa del Este F.C.		(Panama) Juan Carlos Fuentes	Adidas	McDonald's, Cremoso
Independiente		(Venezuela) Francisco Perlo	Everlast	Cemento Interoces, Eco Moda, Las Anclas, Preval
Plaza Amador	TBD	(Colombia) Javier Alvarez	Umbro	Balboa
Santa Gema		(Panama) Carlos Rivera	Kelme	ShowPro
San Francisco	Julio Quijano	(Colombia) Gonzalo Soto	Puma	KFC, Canon, Banco General, Balboa
Sporting San Miguelito	TBD	(Colombia) Jair Palacios	Keuka	Pio Pio, Los Andes Mall, GMG, Melo
Tauro	TBD	(Uruguay) Saul Maldonado	Patrick	Publica Amarias, Dominos, Estrella Azul, Argos, Capital Bank

=== Standings ===
Pos	Team	Pld	W	D	L	GF	GA	GD	Pts	Qualification or relegation
1	San Francisco	18	11	5	2	33	15	+18	38	Advance to Playoffs (Semifinals)
2	Árabe Unido	18	10	5	3	28	17	+11	35	Advance to Playoffs (Semifinals)
3	Independiente	18	10	4	4	30	18	+12	34	Advance to Playoffs (Quarterfinals)
4	Tauro	18	8	4	6	24	18	+6	28	Advance to Playoffs (Quarterfinals)
5	Sporting San Miguelito	18	8	4	6	21	15	+6	28	Advance to Playoffs (Quarterfinals)
6	Universitario	18	7	4	7	22	22	0	25	Advance to Playoffs (Quarterfinals)
7	Plaza Amador	18	6	6	6	16	12	+4	24	
8	Costa del Este	18	6	5	7	20	18	+2	23	
9	Alianza	18	4	3	11	14	30	−16	15	
10	Santa Gema	18	0	0	18	7	50	−43	0	

Source: Soccerway
Rules for classification: 1) points; 2) goal difference; 3) number of goals scored.

=== Results ===
Home \ Away	ALI	ARA	CDE	IND	PLA	SFR	SGE	SSM	TAU	UNI
Alianza	—	0–1	1–0	0–2	0–3	0–1	3–1	0–1	0–2	0–3
Árabe Unido	4–1	—	2–0	3–3	1–1	1–4	3–0	1–0	1–0	1–2
Costa del Este	3–0	0–1	—	1–2	0–0	1–1	3–0	1–0	1–0	0–2
Independiente	2–0	0–2	0–0	—	2–1	2–2	2–0	2–1	4–3	0–0
Plaza Amador	1–1	2–1	0–0	1–0	—	0–1	3–0	0–1	0–1	0–0
San Francisco	2–2	1–1	3–0	0–1	2–1	—	3–0	2–1	2–0	0–0
Santa Gema	0–4	2–3	0–3	0–3	0–1	1–3	—	0–1	1–2	2–4
Sporting San Miguelito	1–1	0–0	5–2	1–0	0–0	2–1	3–0	—	1–1	1–0
Tauro	0–1	0–0	1–1	2–1	2–1	1–3	3–0	2–1	—	4–0
Universitario	3–0	1–2	0–4	1–4	0–1	1–2	3–0	2–1	0–0	—

Source: Soccerway
Legend: Blue = home team win; Yellow = draw; Red = away team win.
For upcoming matches, an "a" indicates there is an article about the rivalry between the two participants.

=== Playoffs ===
==== Quarterfinals ====
May 14, 2019
20:00

Independiente	2–1	Universitario
Aguilar 23'; Torres 40'	Report	Dinalos 78'

Estadio Agustín Sánchez, La Chorrera
Referee: Ameth Sánchez

May 14, 2019
20:00

Tauro	1–0	Sporting San Miguelito
Catuy 15'	Report

Estadio Rommel Fernández, Panama City
Referee: Victor Rios

==== Semifinals ====
===== First leg =====
May 18, 2019
20:00

Tauro	1–1	San Francisco
Ariano 58'		Zúñiga 34'

Estadio Rommel Fernández, Panama City
Referee: John Pitti

May 19, 2019
20:00

Independiente	2–1	Árabe Unido
Negrete 41'; Aguilar 65'		Arroyo 31'

Estadio Agustín Sánchez, La Chorrera
Referee: Oliver Vergara

===== Second leg =====
May 24, 2019
18:00

Árabe Unido	2–1	Independiente
Heraldez 7'; Cox 63'		Negrete 5'
Penalties
Cañate (penalty scored); Brown (penalty scored); Ferrera (penalty scored); Cox (penalty scored); Arroyo (penalty missed); Pereira (penalty missed)	4-5	Aguilar (penalty missed); Bolívar (penalty scored); Espinoza (penalty scored); Negrete (penalty scored); Torres (penalty scored); Edwards (penalty scored)

Estadio Armando Dely Valdés, Colón
Referee: Ameth Sánchez

May 25, 2019
18:00

San Francisco	1–0	Tauro
Jhamal Rodríguez 42' (pen.)

Estadio Agustín Sánchez, La Chorrera
Referee: Victor Rios

==== Final ====
June 1, 2019
18:00

San Francisco	1–1 (a.e.t.)	Independiente
Guido Rouse 120+4'		Abdiel Ayarza 117'
Penalties
	1-4

Estadio Rommel Fernández, Panama City
Referee: John Pitti

== Aggregate table ==
Pos	Team	Pld	W	D	L	GF	GA	GD	Pts	Qualification or relegation
1	San Francisco (Q)	36	18	9	9	52	34	+18	63	CONCACAF League preliminary round (Note: As runners-up with better aggregate record (PAN3))
2	Árabe Unido	36	18	9	9	46	34	+12	63	
3	Tauro (Q)	36	15	10	11	57	38	+19	55	CONCACAF League round of 16 (Note: As Apertura champions (PAN1))
4	Independiente (Q)	36	14	12	10	50	40	+10	54	CONCACAF League round of 16 (Note: As Clausura champions (PAN2))
5	Costa del Este	36	13	13	10	38	30	+8	52	
6	Plaza Amador	36	12	13	11	31	26	+5	49	
7	Universitario	36	12	10	14	40	45	−5	46	
8	Sporting San Miguelito	36	11	12	13	38	41	−3	45	
9	Alianza	36	9	11	16	30	47	−17	38	
10	Santa Gema (R)	36	5	7	24	27	74	−47	22	Relegated to Liga de Ascenso

Source: Soccerway Soccerway
Rules for classification: 1) points; 2) goal difference; 3) number of goals scored.
(Q) Qualified for the phase indicated; (R) Relegated

== List of foreign players in the league ==
This is a list of foreign players for the 2018-2019. The following players:

1. have played at least one game for the respective club.
2. have not been capped for the Panama national football team on any level, independently from the birthplace

Alianza
- (Colombia) Robyn Pertuz
- (Colombia) Adrian Ararat
- (Colombia) Edwin Grueso
- (Colombia) Mike Campaz
- (Venezuela) Yeferson Paz
- (Colombia) Mauricio Castaño
- (United States) Giandemir Jaen Ríos

Arabe Unido
- (Colombia) Faber Gil
- (Colombia) Raul Peñaranda
- (Colombia) Mauricio Castaño
- (Dominican Republic) Miguel Lloyd
- (Colombia) Johnatan Mosquera

Chosta del Este FC
- (Venezuela) Daniel Blanco
- (Colombia) Ariel Bonilla x
- (Colombia) Andres Escobar x
- (Colombia) David Loaiza x
- (Colombia) Julian Munoz x

Independiente
- (Colombia) David Uribe x
- (Colombia) Gerardo Negrete x
- (Cuba) Arichel Hernandez x
- (Colombia) Gustavo Bolivar
- (Argentina) Abel Marcovecchio x

Plaza Amador
- (Argentina) Nicolás Parodi
- (Argentina) José Tamburell

Santa Gema
- (Argentina) Juan Cano x
- (Colombia) Jhoan Romero x
- (Colombia) Milton Segura x

San Francisco FC
- (Colombia) Emerson Hurtado
- (Colombia) Cristian Pérez
- (Colombia) Humberto Mendoza

Sporting San Miguelito
- (Colombia) Wilmer Largacha
- (Colombia) Jorge Sandoval x
- (Colombia) Daniel Cano

Tauro FC
- (Colombia) Alexander Amut
- (Colombia) Gustavo Chara
- (Colombia) Juan Andrés Balanta
- (Argentina) (Spain) Santiago Feuillassier

UD Universitario
- (Argentina) Gianfranco Cao
- (Argentina) Cristian Fabbiani
- (Colombia) Oliver Fula
- (Mexico) Richard Okunorobo

(player released mid season) (player released during Apertura and Clausura)
