= César Samudio =

Panamanian footballer (born 1994)

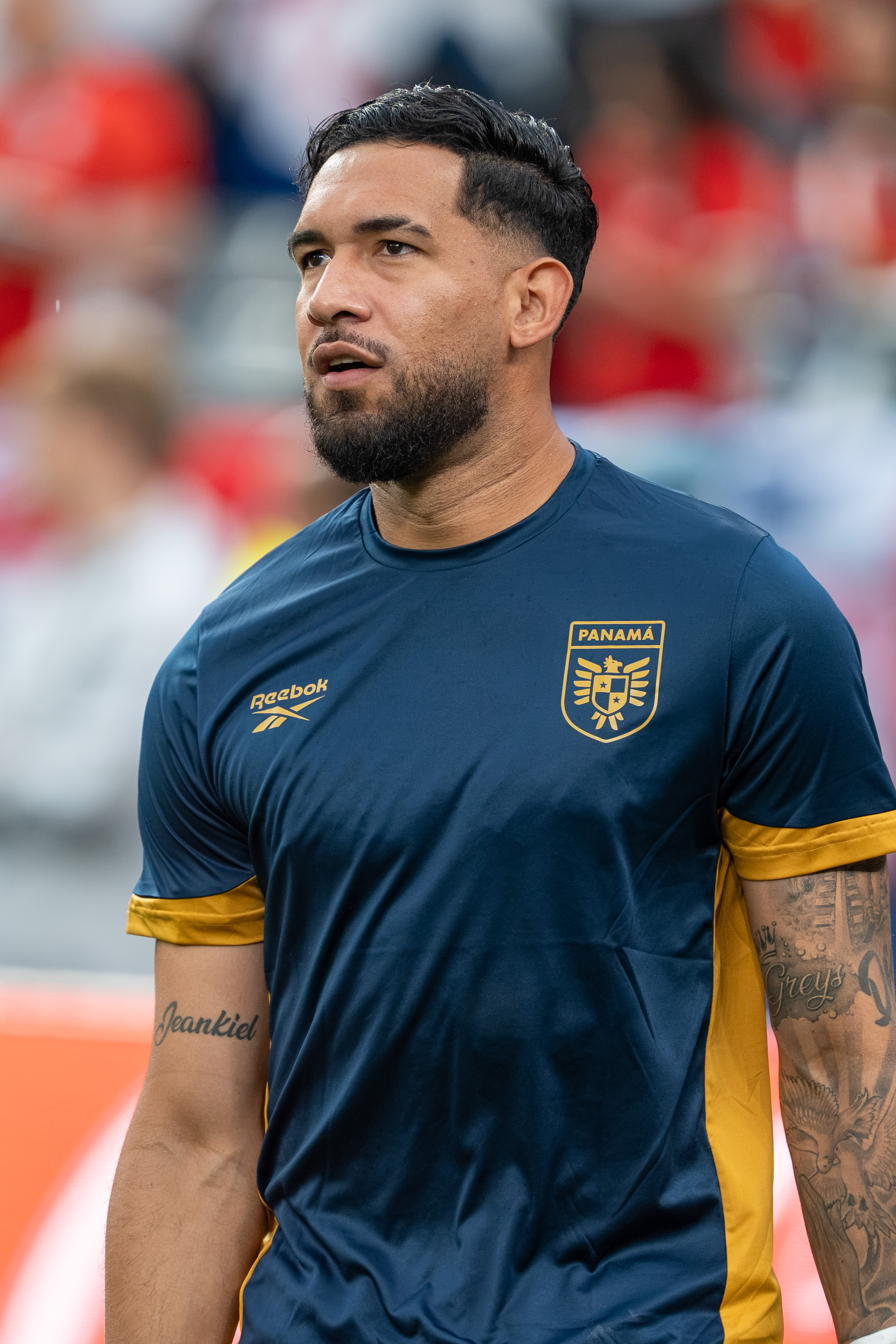
- Samudio with Panama in 2026

Personal information
- Full name: César Jair Samudio Murillo
- Date of birth: 23 February 1994 (age 32)
- Place of birth: Panama City, Panama
- Height: 1.88 m (6 ft 2 in)
- Position: Goalkeeper

Team information
- Current team: Marathón
- Number: 23

Senior career*
Years	Team	Apps	(Gls)
2013–2016	Chepo	27	(0)
2016–2017	Atlético Veragüense	10	(0)
2018–2019	Costa del Este	8	(0)
2019	Plaza Amador	0	(0)
2020	Costa del Este	10	(0)
2021–2023	CAI	53	(0)
2023	→ Marathón (loan)	22	(0)
2023–	Marathón	41	(0)

International career^{‡}
2022–	Panama	2	(0)
- * Club domestic league appearances and goals as of 16 June 2024 ‡ National team caps and goals as of 16 June 2024

César Jair Samudio Murillo (born 23 February 1994) is a Panamanian professional footballer who plays as a goalkeeper for Honduran side Marathón and the Panama national team.

== Club career ==
Born in Panama City, Samudio played as a senior for Chepo, Atlético Veragüense, Costa del Este, Plaza Amador and CAI in his home country. He won the 2022 Liga Panameña de Fútbol with the latter, being named the Most Valuable Player of the competition.

On 7 January 2023, Samudio moved abroad and signed for Marathón in Honduras. Initially on loan, he signed a permanent contract until December 2026 with the club on 26 May.

== International career ==
Samudio received his first call-up to the Panama in April 2022, for a non-FIFA friendly against El Salvador. He made his debut on 1 May, starting in the 3–2 loss at the WakeMed Soccer Park in Cary, North Carolina.

Samudio's full international debut occurred on 10 June 2023, replacing Luis Mejía in a 3–2 win over Nicaragua.

== Honours ==
Panama

- CONCACAF Gold Cup runner-up: 2023
