= Gustavo Bolívar =

Gustavo Bolívar may refer to:

- Gustavo Bolívar (footballer) (born 1985), Colombian football player
- Gustavo Bolívar (author) (born 1966), Colombian author, screenwriter and journalist
