= 2023 CONCACAF Central American Cup =

Association football tournament

Tournament details
- Dates: 1 August – 7 December
- Teams: 20 (from 7 associations)

Final positions
- Champions: (Costa Rica) Alajuelense (1st title)
- Runners-up: (Nicaragua) Real Estelí

Tournament statistics
- Matches played: 58
- Goals scored: 166 (2.86 per match)
- Top scorer(s): (Argentina) Agustín Auzmendi (7 goals)
- Best player: (Costa Rica) Aarón Suárez
- Best young player: (Costa Rica) Doryan Rodríguez
- Best goalkeeper: (Costa Rica) Leonel Moreira

The 2023 CONCACAF Central American Cup was the first edition of the CONCACAF Central American Cup, the first-tier annual international club football competition in the Central American region. It was contested by clubs whose football associations are affiliated with the Central American Football Union (UNCAF), a sub-confederation of CONCACAF.

The winners of the 2023 CONCACAF Central American Cup qualified to the 2024 CONCACAF Champions Cup Round of 16, while the second through sixth place teams qualified to Round One in the same competition.

== Teams ==
Twenty teams from the seven UNCAF member associations qualified for the tournament based on results from their domestic leagues. For this edition only, Honduras and Costa Rica have been awarded an extra berth based on performance in the 2022 CONCACAF League.

- Costa Rica and Honduras: 4 berths
- El Salvador, Guatemala and Panama: 3 berths
- Nicaragua: 2 berths
- Belize: 1 berth

Association	Team	Qualifying method
Belize (1 berth)	Verdes	2022–23 Premier League (Opening and Closing) champions.
Costa Rica (4 berths)	Saprissa	2022–23 Liga FPD Apertura and Clausura champions
Costa Rica (4 berths)	Herediano	2022–23 Liga FPD aggregate table best team not yet qualified
Costa Rica (4 berths)	Alajuelense	2022–23 Liga FPD aggregate table 2nd best team not yet qualified
Costa Rica (4 berths)	Cartaginés	2022–23 Liga FPD aggregate table 3rd best team not yet qualified
El Salvador (3 berths)	FAS	2022–23 Primera División Apertura champions
El Salvador (3 berths)	Jocoro	2022–23 Primera División Apertura runners-up
El Salvador (3 berths)	Águila	2022–23 Primera División aggregate table best team not yet qualified
Guatemala (3 berths)	Cobán Imperial	2022–23 Liga Nacional Torneo Apertura champions
Guatemala (3 berths)	Xelajú	2022–23 Liga Nacional Torneo Clausura champions
Guatemala (3 berths)	Comunicaciones	2022–23 Liga Nacional aggregate table best team not yet qualified
Honduras (4 berths)	Olimpia	2022–23 Honduran Liga Nacional Apertura and Clausura champions
Honduras (4 berths)	Olancho	2022–23 Honduran Liga Nacional aggregate table best team not yet qualified
Honduras (4 berths)	Real España	2022–23 Honduran Liga Nacional aggregate table 2nd best team not yet qualified
Honduras (4 berths)	Motagua	2022–23 Honduran Liga Nacional aggregate table 3rd best team not yet qualified
Nicaragua (2 berths)	Real Estelí	2022–23 Liga Primera Apertura and Clausura champions
Nicaragua (2 berths)	Diriangén	2022–23 Liga Primera aggregate table best team not yet qualified
Panama (3 berths)	Independiente	2022 Liga Panameña Torneo Clausura and 2023 Liga Panameña Torneo Apertura champions
Panama (3 berths)	Sporting San Miguelito	2022 Liga Panameña Torneo Clausura and 2023 Liga Panameña Torneo Apertura aggregate table best team not yet qualified
Panama (3 berths)	Universitario	2022 Liga Panameña Torneo Clausura and 2023 Liga Panameña Torneo Apertura aggregate table 2nd best team not yet qualified

Notes

1. El Salvador (SLV): Originally, El Salvador's berths were reserved for the 2022 Apertura tournament champions, the 2023 Clausura tournament champions and the best team in the aggregate table, however the Clausura tournament was terminated early without proclaiming a champion due to the events that occurred on 20 May 2023 during the match between Alianza and FAS at Estadio Cuscatlán. As a result, the Salvadoran Football Federation decided to reassign the Clausura champions' berth to the Apertura runners-up.

== Draw ==
Location of teams of the 2023 CONCACAF Central American Cup

The draw for the group stage was held on 8 June 2023 in Miami, Florida, United States. The 20 involved teams were previously seeded into five pots of four teams each based on their CONCACAF Club Ranking as of 28 May 2023.

Pot 1
Team	Rank
(Honduras) Olimpia	38
(Costa Rica) Saprissa	47
(Guatemala) Comunicaciones	49
(Costa Rica) Alajuelense	51

Pot 2
Team	Rank
(Honduras) Motagua	53
(Guatemala) Xelajú	57
(Costa Rica) Herediano	58
(Guatemala) Cobán Imperial	59

Pot 3
Team	Rank
(Honduras) Real España	60
(Panama) Independiente	61
(Costa Rica) Cartaginés	65
(Honduras) Olancho	67

Pot 4
Team	Rank
(Panama) Sporting San Miguelito	72
(El Salvador) Águila	79
(Panama) Universitario	95
(El Salvador) FAS	109

Pot 5
Team	Rank
(Nicaragua) Real Estelí	116
(Nicaragua) Diriangén	118
(El Salvador) Jocoro	132
(Belize) Verdes	177

For the group stage, the 20 teams were drawn into four groups (Groups A–D) of five containing a team from each of the five pots. Teams from pot 1 were drawn first and were placed in the first position of their group, starting from Group A to Group D. The same procedure was followed for teams from pots 2, 3, 4 and 5, and they were placed in positions 2, 3, 4 and 5, respectively, within the group to which they were drawn. Each group must contain no more than two clubs from the same national association.

== Schedule ==
The schedule of the competition was as follows.

Stage	Round	First leg	Second leg
Group stage	Matchday 1	1–3 August	
Group stage	Matchday 2	8–10 August	
Group stage	Matchday 3	15–17 August	
Group stage	Matchday 4	22–24 August	
Group stage	Matchday 5	29–31 August	
Knockout stage	Quarterfinals	26–28 September	3 October – 5 October
Knockout stage	Semifinals and play-in	24–26 October	31 October – 2 November
Knockout stage	Finals	28–30 November	5–7 December

== Group stage ==
In the group stage, each group is played on a single home-and-away round-robin basis, with teams playing against each other once, for a total of four matches per team (two home and two away). The winners and runners-up of each group advanced to the quarter-finals of the knockout stage.

=== Group A ===
Pos	Team	Pld	W	D	L	GF	GA	GD	Pts	Qualification	SAP	CAR	UNI	COB	JOC
1	(Costa Rica) Saprissa	4	3	1	0	10	0	+10	10	Advance to Quarter-finals	—	1–0	—	5–0	—
2	(Costa Rica) Cartaginés	4	2	1	1	8	3	+5	7	Advance to Quarter-finals	—	—	2–2	—	5–0
3	(Panama) Universitario	4	1	3	0	6	3	+3	6		0–0	—	—	—	4–1
4	(Guatemala) Cobán Imperial	4	1	1	2	4	7	−3	4		—	0–1	0–0	—	—
5	(El Salvador) Jocoro	4	0	0	4	2	17	−15	0		0–4	—	—	1–4	—

Source: CONCACAF
Rules for classification: 1) Points; 2) Goal difference; 3) Goals scored; 4) Head-to-head results (points, goal difference, goals scored); 5) Fair play points; 6) Drawing of lots.

=== Group B ===
Pos	Team	Pld	W	D	L	GF	GA	GD	Pts	Qualification	IND	EST	OLI	XEL	FAS
1	(Panama) Independiente	4	3	1	0	11	3	+8	10	Advance to Quarter-finals	—	2–1	—	—	5–0
2	(Nicaragua) Real Estelí	4	3	0	1	5	2	+3	9	Advance to Quarter-finals	—	—	1–0	1–0	—
3	(Honduras) Olimpia	4	2	1	1	7	4	+3	7		1–1	—	—	2–0	—
4	(Guatemala) Xelajú	4	1	0	3	3	7	−4	3		1–3	—	—	—	2–1
5	(El Salvador) FAS	4	0	0	4	3	13	−10	0		—	0–2	2–4	—	—

Source: CONCACAF
Rules for classification: 1) Points; 2) Goal difference; 3) Goals scored; 4) Head-to-head results (points, goal difference, goals scored); 5) Fair play points; 6) Drawing of lots.

=== Group C ===
Pos	Team	Pld	W	D	L	GF	GA	GD	Pts	Qualification	HER	COM	RES	ÁGU	DIR
1	(Costa Rica) Herediano	4	3	1	0	8	4	+4	10	Advance to Quarter-finals	—	—	3–2	2–0	—
2	(Guatemala) Comunicaciones	4	3	0	1	9	4	+5	9	Advance to Quarter-finals	1–2	—	3–1	—	—
3	(Honduras) Real España	4	1	1	2	6	6	0	4		—	—	—	3–0	0–0
4	(El Salvador) Águila	4	1	0	3	2	9	−7	3		—	1–4	—	—	1–0
5	(Nicaragua) Diriangén	4	0	2	2	1	3	−2	2		1–1	0–1	—	—	—

Source: CONCACAF
Rules for classification: 1) Points; 2) Goal difference; 3) Goals scored; 4) Head-to-head results (points, goal difference, goals scored); 5) Fair play points; 6) Drawing of lots.

=== Group D ===
Pos	Team	Pld	W	D	L	GF	GA	GD	Pts	Qualification	ALA	MOT	SSM	OLA	VER
1	(Costa Rica) Alajuelense	4	4	0	0	10	1	+9	12	Advance to Quarter-finals	—	5–1	—	1–0	—
2	(Honduras) Motagua	4	3	0	1	9	5	+4	9	Advance to Quarter-finals	—	—	2–0	1–0	—
3	(Panama) Sporting San Miguelito	4	2	0	2	6	3	+3	6		0–1	—	—	—	4–0
4	(Honduras) Olancho	4	1	0	3	3	6	−3	3		—	—	0–2	—	3–2
5	(Belize) Verdes	4	0	0	4	2	15	−13	0		0–3	0–5	—	—	—

Source: CONCACAF
Rules for classification: 1) Points; 2) Goal difference; 3) Goals scored; 4) Head-to-head results (points, goal difference, goals scored); 5) Fair play points; 6) Drawing of lots.

== Knockout stage ==
The knockout stage was played on a single-elimination tournament with the following rules:

- Each tie was played on a home-and-away two-legged basis. The home team of the second leg in each tie was determined separately for each round as follows (Regulations Article 12.11):
  - In the quarter-finals, the group winners hosted the second leg.
  - In the semi-finals and play-in, the higher-ranked teams based on total points accumulated in the group stage and the quarterfinals hosted the second leg.
  - In the finals, the higher-ranked team based on total points accumulated in the group stage, quarterfinals, and semi-finals hosted the second leg.
- In the quarter-finals and semi-finals, if tied on aggregate, the away goals rule would be used. If still tied, the penalty shoot-out would be directly used to determine the winners (Regulations Article 12.10.2).
- In the play-in and finals, if tied on aggregate, the away goals rule would also be used. If still tied, 30 minutes of extra time would be played without the away goals rule during this time. If still tied after extra time, the penalty shoot-out would be used to determine the winner (Regulations Article 12.10.3).

=== Qualified teams ===
The winners and runners-up of each of the four groups in the group stage advanced to the quarter-finals.

Group	Winners	Runners-up
A	(Costa Rica) Saprissa	(Costa Rica) Cartaginés
B	(Panama) Independiente	(Nicaragua) Real Estelí
C	(Costa Rica) Herediano	(Guatemala) Comunicaciones
D	(Costa Rica) Alajuelense	(Honduras) Motagua

=== Seeding ===
Teams were seeded 1–8 based on results in the group stage and assigned a position in a fixed bracket. For example, the first semi-final was contested between the winner of the 1 vs. 8 quarter-final and the winner of the 4 vs. 5 quarter-final. For each round, the host of the second leg was determined based on performance in all previous rounds, including the group stage.

The following was the seeding for the quarter-finals round only:

Seed	Grp	Team	Pld	W	D	L	GF	GA	GD	Pts	Matchups
1	D	(Costa Rica) Alajuelense	4	4	0	0	10	1	+9	12	Match QF1
2	A	(Costa Rica) Saprissa	4	3	1	0	10	0	+10	10	Match QF3
3	B	(Panama) Independiente	4	3	1	0	11	3	+8	10	Match QF4
4	C	(Costa Rica) Herediano	4	3	1	0	8	4	+4	10	Match QF2
5	C	(Guatemala) Comunicaciones	4	3	0	1	9	4	+5	9	Match QF2
6	D	(Honduras) Motagua	4	3	0	1	9	5	+4	9	Match QF4
7	B	(Nicaragua) Real Estelí	4	3	0	1	5	2	+3	9	Match QF3
8	A	(Costa Rica) Cartaginés	4	2	1	1	8	3	+5	7	Match QF1

Source: CONCACAF
Rules for classification: 1) Points; 2) Goal difference; 3) Goals scored; 4) Away goals scored; 5) Wins; 6) Away wins; 7) Disciplinary points (1 point for yellow card, 3 points for second yellow card/indirect red card, 4 points for direct red card, 5 points for yellow card and direct red card); 8) Drawing of lots (Regulations Article 12.11.4).

=== Bracket ===
The bracket was decided based on the quarter-finals seeding.

Play-in
(Honduras) Motagua	2	0	2
(Costa Rica) Saprissa	2	4	6
(Costa Rica) Cartaginés	1	1	2 (4)
(Guatemala) Comunicaciones (p)	1	1	2 (5)

Quarter-finals
7	(Nicaragua) Real Estelí	1	2	3
2	(Costa Rica) Saprissa	0	2	2
6	(Honduras) Motagua	1	0	1
3	(Panama) Independiente	1	2	3
5	(Guatemala) Comunicaciones	0	2	2
4	(Costa Rica) Herediano	0	3	3
8	(Costa Rica) Cartaginés	1	0	1
1	(Costa Rica) Alajuelense	3	3	6

Semi-finals
(Nicaragua) Real Estelí	1	2	3
(Panama) Independiente	0	2	2
(Costa Rica) Herediano	2	2	4 (4)
(Costa Rica) Alajuelense (p)	2	2	4 (5)

Finals
(Nicaragua) Real Estelí	0	1	1
(Costa Rica) Alajuelense	3	1	4

1. ^{†} Order of legs to be decided, with the higher-ranked team in each tie hosting the second leg.

=== Quarter-finals ===
The first legs were played on 26–28 September, and the second legs were played on 3–5 October 2023.

Team 1	Agg.	Team 2	1st leg	2nd leg
Cartaginés (Costa Rica)	1–6	(Costa Rica) Alajuelense	1–3	0–3
Comunicaciones (Guatemala)	2–3	(Costa Rica) Herediano	0–0	2–3
Real Estelí (Nicaragua)	3–2	(Costa Rica) Saprissa	1–0	2–2
Motagua (Honduras)	1–3	(Panama) Independiente	1–1	0–2

=== Play-in ===
The first legs were played on 24–25 October, and the second legs were played on 31 October – 1 November 2023.

Team 1	Agg.	Team 2	1st leg	2nd leg
Cartaginés (Costa Rica)	2–2 (4–5 p)	(Guatemala) Comunicaciones	1–1	1–1 (a.e.t.)
Motagua (Honduras)	2–6	(Costa Rica) Saprissa	2–2	0–4

=== Semi-finals ===
The first legs were played on 25–26 October, and the second legs were played on 1–2 November 2023.

Team 1	Agg.	Team 2	1st leg	2nd leg
Herediano (Costa Rica)	4–4 (4–5 p)	(Costa Rica) Alajuelense	2–2	2–2
Real Estelí (Nicaragua)	3–2	(Panama) Independiente	1–0	2–2

=== Finals ===
Team 1	Agg.	Team 2	1st leg	2nd leg
Real Estelí (Nicaragua)	1–4	(Costa Rica) Alajuelense	0–3	1–1

== Top goalscorers ==
Team eliminated for this round.
Team inactive for this round.

Rank	Player	Team	GS1	GS2	GS3	GS4	GS5	QF1	QF2	PI1	PI2	SF1	SF2	F1	F2	Total
1	(Argentina) Agustín Auzmendi	(Honduras) Motagua	3				1	1		2						7
2	(Panama) Carlos Small	(Panama) Independiente	1			1	1		2							5
3	(Jamaica) Javon East	(Costa Rica) Saprissa	1				2		1							4
3	(Cuba) Marcel Hernández	(Costa Rica) Cartaginés				1	1	1			1					4
3	(Costa Rica) Ariel Rodríguez	(Costa Rica) Saprissa		2			1				1					4
3	(Costa Rica) Orlando Sinclair	(Costa Rica) Saprissa					2		1		1					4
3	(Costa Rica) Aarón Suárez	(Costa Rica) Alajuelense	1	1				1	1							4
8	(Panama) Jorman Aguilar	(Guatemala) Comunicaciones		1			1				1					3
8	(Costa Rica) Michael Barrantes	(Costa Rica) Alajuelense		1			1							1		3
8	(Honduras) Jorge Benguché	(Honduras) Olimpia	1			2										3
8	(Costa Rica) Joel Campbell	(Costa Rica) Alajuelense						1					1		1	3
8	(Mexico) Jesús Godínez	(Costa Rica) Herediano		2								1				3
8	(Panama) Freddy Góndola	(Costa Rica) Alajuelense		1					1					1		3
8	(Honduras) Yeison Mejía	(Honduras) Motagua		2	1											3
8	(Costa Rica) Joshua Navarro	(Costa Rica) Alajuelense					2							1		3
8	(Argentina) Ramiro Rocca	(Honduras) Real España					3									3
8	(Costa Rica) Johan Venegas	(Costa Rica) Alajuelense					1	1				1				3

== Awards ==
The following awards were given at the end of the tournament:

Award	Player	Team
Golden Ball	(Costa Rica) Aarón Suárez	(Costa Rica) Alajuelense
Golden Boot	(Argentina) Agustín Auzmendi	(Honduras) Motagua
Golden Glove	(Costa Rica) Leonel Moreira	(Costa Rica) Alajuelense
Best Young Player	(Costa Rica) Doryan Rodríguez	(Costa Rica) Alajuelense
Fair Play Award	—	(Costa Rica) Alajuelense

Team of the Tournament
Position	Player	Team
GK	(Costa Rica) Leonel Moreira	(Costa Rica) Alajuelense
DF	(Nicaragua) Bancy Hernández	(Nicaragua) Real Estelí
DF	(Nicaragua) Evert Martínez	(Nicaragua) Real Estelí
DF	(Colombia) José Corena	(Guatemala) Comunicaciones
MF	(Costa Rica) Celso Borges	(Costa Rica) Alajuelense
MF	(Panama) Héctor Hurtado	(Panama) CAI
MF	(Nicaragua) Harold Medina	(Nicaragua) Real Estelí
MF	(Costa Rica) Aarón Suárez	(Costa Rica) Alajuelense
FW	(Costa Rica) Joel Campbell	(Costa Rica) Alajuelense
FW	(Argentina) Agustín Auzmendi	(Honduras) Motagua
FW	(Panama) Carlos Small	(Panama) CAI

== See also ==
- 2023 CONCACAF Caribbean Cup
- 2023 Leagues Cup
- 2024 CONCACAF Champions Cup
