= Erick González (footballer, born 1999) =

Guatemalan footballer

Personal information
- Full name: Erick Denilson González Santizo
- Date of birth: 10 May 1999 (age 27)
- Place of birth: San Marcos, Guatemala
- Height: 1.73 m (5 ft 8 in)
- Position: Defender

Team information
- Current team: Comunicaciones
- Number: 12

Youth career
- 2012–2017: Marquense

Senior career*
Years	Team	Apps	(Gls)
2017–2022	Marquense		
2022–	Comunicaciones	88	(3)
- * Club domestic league appearances and goals

Erick Denilson González Santizo (born 10 May 1999) is a Guatemalan professional footballer who plays as a defender for Liga Guate club Comunicaciones.

== Club career ==
=== Marquense ===
On 9 June 2022, Comunicaciones became interested in signing González.

=== Comunicaciones ===
==== 2022–23: Debut season ====
On 15 June, it was confirmed that González had joined Comunicaciones. On 24 July, he made his debut for the club in a 1–0 loss to Xinabajul.

On 8 February 2023, González was included in the starting line-up for the first time in his career.

==== 2023–24: First league title ====
In the first match of Group C of the 2023 CONCACAF Central American Cup against Real España, González performed a rainbow kick to put the ball past the goalkeeper in a 3–1 win. His goal was named by CONCACAF as the best goal of the group stage. In the second leg, González scored at the 73rd minute, however, it was not enough as Comunicaciones lost 3–2 on aggregate.

==== 2025–26 ====
Amid rumours about a possible transfer away from Comunicaciones, newly appointed manager Roberto Hernández confirmed that González was still in his plans for the upcoming season.

== International career ==
On 3 January 2024, González was called up to the Guatemala national team by Luis Fernando Tena for an upcoming friendly against Iceland.

== Honours ==
Comunicaciones

- Liga Nacional: 2023 Apertura
