= Gilberto Hernández (footballer) =

Panamanian footballer (1997–2023)

Personal information
- Full name: Gilberto Hernández Bultrón
- Date of birth: 26 June 1997
- Place of birth: Colón, Panama
- Date of death: 3 September 2023 (aged 26)
- Place of death: Colón, Panama
- Height: 1.92 m (6 ft 4 in)
- Position: Centre-back

Senior career*
Years	Team	Apps	(Gls)
2018–2022	Árabe Unido	60	(1)
2022	Herrera F.C.	13	(1)
2022–2023	C.A. Independiente	32	(7)
Total		105	(9)

International career
2019	Panama U22	2	(0)
2023	Panama	2	(0)
- * Club domestic league appearances and goals

Gilberto Hernández Bultrón (26 June 1997 – 3 September 2023) was a Panamanian professional footballer who played as a centre-back. He made 105 appearances in the Liga Panameña de Fútbol, having played for Árabe Unido, Herrera F.C., and C.A. Independiente. He earned two caps for the Panama national team.

== Club career ==
=== Árabe Unido ===
Hernández made his debut for Árabe Unido against San Francisco F.C., at the Estadio Agustín Sánchez.

=== Herrera F.C. ===
On 4 January 2022, Hernández signed for Herrera F.C. after several seasons at Árabe Unido. He made his debut for the club on 27 March against Plaza Amador.

=== C.A. Independiente ===
On 8 June 2022, Hernández signed with C.A. Independiente. He made his debut with the club on 27 June against Veraguas United FC, at the Estadio Agustín Muquita Sánchez. He was champion with the club of the 2022 Clausura and 2023 Apertura seasons. He played his last match on 23 August 2023 in a 3–1 victory against Real Estelí at the Estadio Rommel Fernández, at the 2023 CONCACAF Central American Cup.

== International career ==
Hernández was called up by the Panama U-22 team to play the 2019 Pan American Games. He made his debut with the senior team on 12 March 2023 against Guatemala in a friendly.

== Death ==
Hernández was killed and six others were injured on 3 September 2023 on Calle 5, Avenida Herrera, Colón Province, after two men arrived in a taxi and opened fire on a street. The shooting was most likely related to a gang rivalry going on in Colón.

== Honours ==
C.A. Independiente

- Liga Panameña de Fútbol: 2022 Clasura, 2023 Apertura

== See also ==
- List of association football players who died during their careers
