= César Medina (Panamanian footballer) =

Panamanian footballer (born 1981)

Personal information
- Full name: César Augusto Medina Mejía
- Date of birth: 10 April 1981 (age 45)
- Place of birth: Pacora, Panamá
- Height: 1.79 m (5 ft 10 in)
- Position: Forward

Senior career*
Years	Team	Apps	(Gls)
2003–2008	Alianza		
2009	Olimpia		
20010	Pisa		
2010–2011	Alianza		
2012	Comunicaciones		
2013–2024	Alianza		

International career
2007	Panama	1	(0)
- * Club domestic league appearances and goals

César Augusto Medina Mejía (born 10 April 1981) is a Panamanian footballer who played as a forward with Alianza for over a decade, from 2012 until 2024. He also played one match for the Panama national team in 2007.

== Early life ==
César Medina was born in Pacora on 10 April 1981, as the son of Rigoberto Medina and Ana Raquel Mejía, a working-class, humble family, earning the nickname "Bombo" because he was chubby as a child.

== Club career ==
Following a good performance in a showcasing friendly held in Pacora, Professor Gustavo Ávila brought Medina to Dinamo, a local team, where he initially struggled to practice, but soon got himself together with the help of his parents. He made his debut for the first team at Candela Gil on 28 December 1995, aged 15. Ten years later, in 2005, he made his debut for Alianza, scoring two goals against Plaza Amador, and in his fourth appearance, he scored a four-goal haul in a 6–2 win over Atlético Veraguense.

Having spent all my years playing here, when I step onto this pitch I give everything for this team, even if it's a small team like people say, but hey, you have to keep going.

— César Medina in 2014

In 2009, Medina spent a few months with Olimpia in Honduras, where he failed to score a single goal, and with Pisa in Italy, where he failed to adapt, so he returned to Alianza, with whom he played for over a decade, from 2012 until 2024. In mid-2015, he had already scored 113 top-tier goals for Alianza. On 28 May 2022, he started in the final of the Apertura tournament of the Panamanian top-flight, helping his side to a 1–2 victory over Sporting San Miguelito. He announced his retirement in May 2024, leaving Alianza after nearly 20 years and with a total of 178 official goals in the Panamanian league, making him the second highest scorer in its history. Regarded as Alianza's most valuable player in 61 years, the club decided to honour him by officially retiring the number 24 jersey, which identified him throughout his career.

According to IFFHS, Medina was the third-oldest player in the world to play a match in the top tier of a national league in 2024, at the age of 44 years and 22 days, in his last career match in the Panamanian league against San Miguelito on 2 May, which ended in a 0–1 loss.

== International career ==
On 14 October 2008, Medina earned his first (and only) international cap in a friendly match against Honduras, which ended in a 0–1 loss.

== Honours ==
Olimpia

- Honduran Liga Nacional (Clausura): 2009–10

Alianza

- Liga Panameña de Fútbol (Apertura): 2022
