= Luis Asprilla =

Colombian footballer (born 1977)

Personal information
- Full name: Luis Alberto Asprilla Mosquera
- Date of birth: 6 December 1977 (age 48)
- Place of birth: Cali, Colombia
- Height: 1.84 m (6 ft 0 in)
- Position: Defender

Senior career*
Years	Team	Apps	(Gls)
1996–1997	Deportivo Pereira		
1998–1999	Deportes Tolima	7	(1)
2000	Real Cartagena	19	(2)
2000–2004	América de Cali	121	(8)
2004–2005	Olimpo	25	(1)
2006	Millonarios	39	(5)
2007	Atlético Bucaramanga	7	(0)
2007	Emelec	13	(0)
2008	Millonarios	9	(1)
2008	Cúcuta Deportivo		
2009	Depor	0	(0)
2010	Alianza Atlético	38	(2)
2011	Bogotá		

International career
2001	Colombia	1	(0)
- * Club domestic league appearances and goals as of 26 December 2012

Luis Asprilla (born 6 December 1977) is a retired Colombian football defender.

He played for the Colombia national team in 2001. He has played outside Colombia for Olimpo de Bahía Blanca in Argentina and Emelec in Ecuador.
