= Douglas López =

Costa Rican footballer (born 1998)

Personal information
- Full name: Douglas Andrey López Araya
- Date of birth: 21 September 1998 (age 28)
- Place of birth: Alajuela, Costa Rica
- Height: 1.80 m (5 ft 11 in)
- Position: Defender

Team information
- Current team: Cartaginés
- Number: 8

Youth career
- Santos de Guápiles

Senior career*
Years	Team	Apps	(Gls)
2017–2021	Santos de Guápiles	106	(9)
2022–2023	Herediano	31	(0)
2022	→ Santos de Guápiles (loan)	16	(1)
2023–	Cartaginés	109	(9)

International career^{‡}
2022–	Costa Rica	6	(0)
- * Club domestic league appearances and goals as of 20 September 2026 ‡ National team caps and goals as of 23:13 (UTC) 4 October 2026

Douglas Andrey López Araya (born 21 September 1998) is a Costa Rican professional footballer for Cartaginés in Liga FPD (the Costa Rican top division) and the Costa Rica national team.

== Career ==
López made his debut for Santos de Guapiles on 22 July 2018 against Deportivo Saprissa. On 5 September 2018 he scored his first goal as a professional, against Municipal de Pérez Zeledón. In October 2021 it was revealed he had agreed to join C.S. Herediano at the end of his contract. In June 2022 López officially joined C.S. Herediano from Santos de Guapiles, signing a contract until 2025. In 2023, he was playing for C.S. Cartaginés and scored in the 2023 CONCACAF Central American Cup against Coban Imperial of Guatemala in August 2023.

== International career ==
López made his debut as a full Costa Rican international on 30 March 2022 in the final qualifying match for the World Cup against the United States, playing the last twenty-two minutes of the 2–0 victory. López was named in the Costa Rica national football team squad for the 2022 FIFA World Cup.

== Career statistics ==
=== International ===
As of match played 4 October 2026

Appearances and goals by national team and year
National team	Year	Apps	Goals
Costa Rica	2022	3	0
Costa Rica	2026	3	0
Total		6	0
