= Joseph Cox (footballer) =

Panamanian footballer (born 1994)

Personal information
- Full name: Joseph Christopher Cox Goods
- Date of birth: 25 June 1994 (age 32)
- Place of birth: Panama
- Height: 1.93 m (6 ft 4 in)
- Position: Forward

Senior career*
Years	Team	Apps	(Gls)
2013–2015	Árabe Unido	33	(6)
2015	Independiente	15	(5)
2015–2016	Chorrillo	12	(2)
2016–2017	Árabe Unido	36	(11)
2017	Envigado	33	(11)
2018–2019	Árabe Unido	19	(8)
2018	→ América de Cali (loan)	6	(0)
2020	Aragua	4	(0)
2020–2022	Árabe Unido	9	(3)
- * Club domestic league appearances and goals

Joseph Christopher Cox Goods (born 25 June 1994) is a Panamanian footballer who plays as a forward for 9 de Octubre FC, who are based in Ecuador. Currently 7th in the second flight of Ecuadorian Football, Joseph Cox has scored 14 goals.
