= Gustavo Bolívar (footballer) =

Colombian footballer (born 1985)

Personal information
- Full name: Gustavo Adolfo Bolívar Zapata
- Date of birth: 16 April 1985 (age 41)
- Place of birth: Apartadó, Colombia
- Height: 1.82 m (6 ft 0 in)
- Position: Defensive midfielder

Senior career*
Years	Team	Apps	(Gls)
2004–2006	Envigado		
2007–2012	Deportes Tolima	137	(7)
2013	Al-Hilal	10	(0)
2013	Itagüí	16	(1)
2014	Deportivo Cali	14	(1)
2015	Deportivo Pasto	18	(0)
2015	Cúcuta Deportivo	18	(3)
2017	Alianza Petrolera	8	(1)
2018–2019	Independiente	51	(1)

International career
2011	Colombia	5	(0)
- * Club domestic league appearances and goals as of 1 December 2019

Gustavo Adolfo Bolívar Zapata (born 16 April 1985), known as Gustavo Bolívar, is a Colombian football player (defensive midfielder).

== Career statistics ==
=== Club ===
As of match played 2 June 2019

Club	Season	League		National cup		Continental		Total	
Club	Season	Apps	Goals	Apps	Goals	Apps	Goals	Apps	Goals
Envigado	2004–2006	38	3	-		-		38	3
Deportes Tolima	2007–2008	63	1	4	0	1	0	68	1
Deportes Tolima	2009	32	2	8	0	-		40	2
Deportes Tolima	2010	22	1	3	0	5	0	30	1
Deportes Tolima	2011	35	1	3	1	7	0	45	2
Deportes Tolima	2012	38	2	3	0	4	0	45	2
Deportes Tolima	Total	190	7	18	1	17	0	223	8
Al-Hilal	2012–13	10	0	3	0	7	0	20	0
Itagüí	2013	16	1	0	0	4	1	20	2
Deportivo Cali	2014	14	1	7	0	3	0	24	1
Deportivo Pasto	2015	18	0	1	0	-		19	0
Cúcuta Deportivo	2015	18	3	0	0	-		18	3
Alianza Petrolera	2017	8	1	6	0	-		14	1
Independiente	2018–19	34	0	0	0	4	0	34	0
Career total		313	16	35	1	31	1	394	18
