= Francisco Perlo =

Venezuelan football manager

Personal information
- Full name: Francisco Alfonso Perlo Marín
- Date of birth: 6 May 1987 (age 39)
- Place of birth: Valencia, Venezuela

Team information
- Current team: Árabe Unido (manager)

Managerial career
- Years: Team
- Centro Italo (youth)
- 2010–2011: Caracas (youth)
- 2013–2014: SC Guaraní (assistant)
- 2014–2015: Carabobo (youth)
- 2016–2017: Costa del Este
- 2017: Leones de América
- 2018: CAI La Chorrera (assistant)
- 2019–2021: CAI La Chorrera
- 2022: Academia Puerto Cabello
- 2022: Zulia
- 2022–2023: Tauro
- 2023: UMECIT
- 2024–: Árabe Unido

Francisco Alfonso Perlo Marín (born 16 May 1987) is a Venezuelan football manager, currently in charge of Panamanian club Árabe Unido.

== Career ==
Born in Valencia, Carabobo, Perlo notably worked in the youth categories of Caracas and Carabobo before moving to Panama in December 2015, after being named manager of Costa del Este. He left the club in 2017, and subsequently took over Leones de América.

On 4 December 2018, after a period as an assistant manager, Perlo was appointed in charge of Independiente de La Chorrera. He led the club to the 2019 and 2020 Clausura titles, before leaving on 9 December 2021.

On 17 December 2021, Perlo returned to his home country and was announced as manager of Primera División side Academia Puerto Cabello. He left the club on a mutual agreement on 13 April 2022, and took over fellow top tier side Zulia six days later.

On 13 August 2022, Perlo resigned from Zulia to return to Panama, and was named manager of Tauro.

== Honours ==
CAI La Chorrera

- Liga Panameña de Fútbol: 2019 Clausura, 2020 Clausura
