= Miguel Corral =

Spanish football manager

Personal information
- Full name: Miguel Corral Torreira
- Date of birth: 10 July 1991 (age 35)
- Place of birth: La Coruña, Spain

Team information
- Current team: Mochudi Centre Chiefs

Managerial career
- Years: Team
- 2022–2023: Herrera FC
- 2023–2025: UMECIT FC
- 2025: Malappuram
- 2026–: Mochudi Centre Chiefs

Miguel Corral Torreira (La Coruña, 10 July 1991) is a Spanish football manager who is the head coach of the Botswana Premier League club Mochudi Centre Chiefs.

After coaching youth sides in Galicia (Spain), he travelled to Panama and was assistant coach in Herrera FC before being appointed manager of the team in 2022. On 27 November 2023, two days after leaving Herrera, he was appointed manager of fellow Liga Panameña de Fútbol club UMECIT FC. He left in June 2025 and signed for Super League Kerala side Malappuram. He left the club on 22 November 2025.

On 9 January 2026 he was appointed manager of Mochudi Centre Chiefs in the Botswana Premier League.
