= Aarón Suárez =

Costa Rican footballer (born 2002)

Personal information
- Full name: Aarón René Suárez Zúñiga
- Date of birth: 27 June 2002 (age 24)
- Place of birth: San José, Costa Rica
- Height: 1.65 m (5 ft 5 in)
- Position: Attacking midfielder

Team information
- Current team: Herediano
- Number: 27

Youth career
- Alajuelense

Senior career*
Years	Team	Apps	(Gls)
2020–2025	Alajuelense	158	(21)
2020	→ Juventud Escazuceña (loan)	14	(5)
2025–2026	Iğdır	2	(0)
2026–	Herediano	8	(0)

International career^{‡}
2018–2019	Costa Rica U-17	6	(0)
2021–	Costa Rica	11	(3)
- * Club domestic league appearances and goals as of 24 October 2026 ‡ National team caps and goals as of 6:00, 3 February 2024 (UTC)

Aarón Suárez Zúñiga (born 27 June 2002), is a Costa Rican professional footballer who plays as an attacking midfielder for Herediano and the Costa Rica national team.

== Career ==
Suarez who hails from La Trinidad District started his career for Deportivo Saprissa, before joined 2019 to Alajuelense. 2020 was promoted to LD Alajuelense first team and made 8 games, before the midfielder joined on loan to Juventud Escazuceña.

== International career ==
Suárez debuted with the Costa Rica national team in a 1–0 2022 FIFA World Cup qualification loss to Canada on 13 November 2021.

== Career statistics ==
=== International ===
As of match played 2 February 2024

Appearances and goals by national team and year
National team	Year	Apps	Goals
Costa Rica	2021	2	0
Costa Rica	2022	2	0
Costa Rica	2023	6	2
Costa Rica	2024	1	1
Total		11	3

Scores and results list Costa Rica's goal tally first, score column indicates score after each Suárez goal.

List of international goals scored by Aarón Suárez
No.	Date	Venue	Opponent	Score	Result	Competition	Ref.
1	25 March 2023	Stade Pierre-Aliker, Fort-de-France, Martinique	Martinique	1–1	2–1	2022–23 CONCACAF Nations League A	
2	26 June 2023	DRV PNK Stadium, Fort Lauderdale, United States	Panama	1–2	1–2	2023 CONCACAF Gold Cup	
3	2 February 2024	National Stadium, San José, Costa Rica	El Salvador	2–0	2–0	Friendly	

== Honours ==
Individual

- CONCACAF League Best Young Player: 2022
