= Potros del Este =

Panamanian football club

Costa del Este FC
- Full name: Costa del Este Futbol Club
- Nicknames: Las Águilas; Los del Este; Los Yeyes
- Founded: 2008 (as Santos FC)
- Ground: Estadio Rommel Fernández
- Capacity: 32,000
- President: (Guatemala) Juan Pablo Serrano
- Manager: (Argentina) Juan Vita
- League: Liga Panameña de Fútbol
- Website: www.costadelestefc.com
Home colours	Away colours

Costa del Este is a Panamanian football club based in Panama City, that currently plays in Liga Panameña de Fútbol. It takes its name from the real estate development in the township of Juan Díaz, Panama City.

== History ==
Since its inception in 2008 and until 2014, the club was based in La Chorrera and known as Santos FC.
Under new ownership the team had a perfect season winning the 2017-18 Liga Nacional de Ascenso Apertura and Clausura tournaments and gaining direct promotion to Liga Panameña de Fútbol.
The winning streak continued during the 2018-19 Liga Panameña de Fútbol Apertura tournament reaching to the title game against Tauro FC losing the match 1–2.

== Honors ==
- Liga Panameña de Fútbol: 1 appearance

2018-19 : Apertura Runner Up

- Liga Nacional de Ascenso: 5 appearances

2017-18 : Winners - Promoted

- Copa Rommel Fernández: 1 appearance

2012 : Winners - Promoted (as Santos FC)

== Kit history ==
=== Jersey Suppliers ===
Períod	Supplier
2014–2015	Adidas Logo
2015–2017	Keuka Logo
2017	
2018	Umbro (brand)
2019	
2020	Mitre
2020–2021	
2021	Givova
2022–present	Luanvi

== Players ==
=== Current squad ===
Note: Flags indicate national team as defined under FIFA eligibility rules; some limited exceptions apply. Players may hold more than one non-FIFA nationality.

No.	Pos.	Nation	Player
1	GK	COL	Luis Rivas
3	DF	PAN	Guillermo Benítez
5	DF	PAN	Angel Ortega
6	DF	PAN	José López
7	MF	PAN	Ricardo Mitre
8	MF	ECU	Luis Banguera
9	FW	PAN	Bayron Walters
10	MF	PAN	Alcides De los Ríos
12	GK	PAN	Eliécer Powell
14	MF	PAN	Víctor Simmons

No.	Pos.	Nation	Player
15	MF	PAN	Josué Luna
17	MF	PAN	Yoameth Murillo
18	DF	PAN	Jaquin Gargonia
20	DF	PAN	Christian Ruíz
22	MF	PAN	kevin Hernández
23	MF	PAN	Omar Valderrama
38	FW	PAN	Kairo Walters
56	FW	PAN	Jordy Hidalgo
—	FW	PAN	Alessandro Canales
—	GK	PAN	Emerson Dimas
—	GK	PAN	Samuel Baptista
—	DF	ECU	Anderson Gómez

== Non-playing staff ==
=== Board of directors ===
Position	Name
President	(Guatemala) Juan Pablo Serrano
Director	(Brazil) Felipe Borowski

=== Management hierarchy ===
Name	Role
-	Head coach
-	Assistant coach
-	Head athletic trainer
-	Goalkeeping coach
-	Team physician

=== Historical list of coaches ===
- (Panama) Edwin Oropeza (2014–16)
- (Venezuela) Francisco Perlo (2016–17)
- (Venezuela) Ángel Sanchez (2017– December 2018)
- (Costa Rica) Carlos Perez Porras (2019-19) 2 matches
- Juan Carlos Fuentes/Francisco Portillo/Juan Walker (2019–19)
- (Argentina) Juan Vita ( - December 2019)
- (Venezuela) Julio Infante (January 2020 - December 2020)
- (Brazil) (Panama) Felipe Borowsky (January 2021 - May 2021)
- (Venezuela) Daniel Blanco (May 2021 - May 2023)
- (Venezuela) Ángel Sanchez (June 2023 - December 2023)
- (Ecuador) Jhon Cagua (December 2023 - Present)
