= José Corena =

Colombian footballer (born 1992)

Personal information
- Full name: José Alfredo Corena Barboza
- Date of birth: 29 September 1992 (age 34)
- Place of birth: Macaján, Sucre, Colombia
- Height: 1.78 m (5 ft 10 in)
- Position: Defender

Team information
- Current team: Comunicaciones
- Number: 28

Senior career*
Years	Team	Apps	(Gls)
2015–2017	Jocotoan		
2017–2021	Guastatoya	128	(14)
2021–	Comunicaciones	152	(15)
- * Club domestic league appearances and goals

José Alfredo Corena Barboza (born 29 September 1992) is a Colombian professional footballer who plays as a defender for Liga Nos Une club Comunicaciones.

== Club career ==
=== Guastatoya ===
On 9 February 2021, Corena announced that he would be leaving the club. During his departure, the president of Guastatoya wished him well and called Corena a club legend.

=== Comunicaciones ===
On 16 February, it was confirmed that Corena would join Comunicaciones. The signing was met with positive feedback from fans on social media.

== International career ==
On 3 September 2024, Corena confirmed he was negotiating with Luis Fernando Tena to possibly represent the Guatemala national team.

On 14 February 2025, the president of the National Football Federation of Guatemala announced that Corena was inching closer to representing the national team.

== Honours ==
Guastatoya

- Liga Guate: 2018 Clausura, 2018 Apertura, 2020 Apertura

Comunicaciones

- Liga Guate: 2022 Clausura, 2023 Apertura
- CONCACAF League: 2021
