= Carlos Small =

Panamanian footballer (born 1995)

Personal information
- Full name: Carlos Daniel Small Cardenas
- Date of birth: 13 March 1995 (age 31)
- Place of birth: Panama
- Height: 1.82 m (5 ft 11 1/2 in)
- Position: Forward

Senior career*
Years	Team	Apps	(Gls)
2014–2017	Sporting San Miguelito	58	(17)
2016	→ Guria Lanchkhuti (loan)	3	(3)
2016	→ Deportivo La Guaira (loan)		
2017–2020	Árabe Unido	67	(17)
2018–2019	→ Rio Grande Valley FC (loan)	42	(17)
2020–2021	Grecia	15	(3)

International career^{‡}
2015	Panama U20	9	(1)
2015	Panama U23	2	(0)
2016–	Panama	6	(2)
- * Club domestic league appearances and goals ‡ National team caps and goals as of 3 May 2021

Carlos Daniel Small Cardenas (born 13 March 1995) is a Panamanian professional footballer.

== International career ==
Small made his international debut for Panama on February 17, 2016 during a friendly match against El Salvador. He scored his first two international goals in a friendly against Grenada in a 5–0 victory for Panama on October 24, 2017.

== Honours ==
Individual

- CONCACAF League Team of the Tournament: 2017

== Career statistics ==
=== International ===
As of matches played 24 October 2017.

National team	Year	Apps	Goals
Panama	2016	1	0
Panama	2017	1	2
Total		1	2

=== International goals ===
Scores and results list Panama's goal tally first.

No	Date	Venue	Opponent	Score	Result	Competition
1.	24 October 2017	Kirani James Athletic Stadium, St. George's, Grenada	Grenada	1–0	5–0	Friendly
2.	24 October 2017	Kirani James Athletic Stadium, St. George's, Grenada	Grenada	3–0	5–0	Friendly
