= 2026 CONCACAF Central American Cup group stage =

The 2026 CONCACAF Central American Cup group stage was played from 28 July to 27 August 2026. A total of 20 teams competed in the group stage to decide the 8 places in the knockout stage of the 2026 CONCACAF Central American Cup.

== Draw ==
The draw for the group stage was held on 26 May 2026, at 20:00 ET (UTC−4), in Miami, Florida, United States. The 20 involved teams were previously seeded into five pots of four teams each based on their CONCACAF Club Ranking as of 25 May 2026.

Pot 1
Team	Rank
(Costa Rica) Alajuelense	39
(Costa Rica) Herediano	42
(Honduras) Olimpia	43
(Guatemala) Municipal	45

Pot 2
Team	Rank
(Costa Rica) Saprissa	46
(Panama) Plaza Amador	55
(Guatemala) Antigua	57
(Honduras) Motagua	58

Pot 3
Team	Rank
(Guatemala) Xelajú	59
(Costa Rica) Cartaginés	60
(Honduras) Marathón	62
(Guatemala) Mixco	64

Pot 4
Team	Rank
(Panama) Alianza	68
(El Salvador) Firpo	71
(Nicaragua) Real Estelí	72
(El Salvador) FAS	75

Pot 5
Team	Rank
(Nicaragua) Diriangén	80
(El Salvador) Alianza	82
(Panama) UMECIT	88
(Belize) Verdes	182

For the group stage, the 20 teams were drawn into four groups (Groups A–D) of five containing a team from each of the five pots. Teams from pot 1 were drawn first and were placed in the first position of their group, starting from Group A to Group D. The same procedure was followed for teams from pots 2, 3, 4 and 5, and they were placed in positions 2, 3, 4 and 5, respectively, within the group to which they were drawn. Each group must contain no more than two clubs from the same national association.

The draw resulted in the following groups:

Group A
Pos	Team
A1	(Costa Rica) Alajuelense
A2	(Panama) Plaza Amador
A3	(Guatemala) Xelajú
A4	(El Salvador) Firpo
A5	(Nicaragua) Diriangén

Group B
Pos	Team
B1	(Costa Rica) Herediano
B2	(Guatemala) Antigua
B3	(Honduras) Marathón
B4	(Nicaragua) Real Estelí
B5	(El Salvador) Alianza

Group C
Pos	Team
C1	(Honduras) Olimpia
C2	(Costa Rica) Saprissa
C3	(Guatemala) Mixco
C4	(Panama) Alianza
C5	(Panama) UMECIT

Group D
Pos	Team
D1	(Guatemala) Municipal
D2	(Honduras) Motagua
D3	(Costa Rica) Cartaginés
D4	(El Salvador) FAS
D5	(Belize) Verdes

== Format ==
In the group stage, each group is played on a single home-and-away round-robin basis, with teams playing against each other once, for a total of four matches per team (two home and two away). The teams are ranked according to the following criteria (Regulations Article 12.10.1):

1. Points (3 points for a win, 1 point for a draw, and 0 points for a loss);
2. Goal difference;
3. Goals scored;
4. If two or more teams are still tied after applying the above criteria, their rankings would be determined as follows:
  1. Head-to-head points in the matches played among the tied teams;
  2. Head-to-head goal difference in the matches played among the tied teams;
  3. Head-to-head goals scored in the matches played among the tied teams;
5. The lowest number of fairplay points, based on the following criteria:
  1. Yellow card: plus 1 point;
  2. Second yellow card/indirect red card: plus 3 points;
  3. direct red card: plus 4 points;;
  4. Yellow card and direct red card: plus 5 points;
6. CONCACAF Club Ranking after the group stage is completed.
7. Drawing of lots by CONCACAF.

The winners and runners-up of each group advanced to the quarter-finals of the knockout stage.

== Schedule ==
Matches in the competition were played on either Tuesday, Wednesday, or Thursday as decided by CONCACAF. The schedule of each week was as follows (Regulations Article 2).

Weeks	Dates	Matches
Week 1	28–30 July 2026	Team 1 vs. Team 3, Team 5 vs. Team 2
Week 2	4–6 August 2026	Team 5 vs. Team 1, Team 2 vs. Team 4
Week 3	11–13 August 2026	Team 4 vs. Team 5, Team 2 vs. Team 3
Week 4	18–20 August 2026	Team 4 vs. Team 1, Team 3 vs. Team 5
Week 5	25–27 August 2026	Team 1 vs. Team 2, Team 3 vs. Team 4

== Groups ==
All match times are in EDT (UTC−4) and local times are in parentheses, as listed by CONCACAF.

=== Group A ===
Pos	Team	Pld	W	D	L	GF	GA	GD	Pts	Qualification	ALA	FIR	PLA	XEL	DIR
1	(Costa Rica) Alajuelense	4	3	0	1	7	3	+4	9	Advance to Quarter-finals	—	—	3–1	1–0	—
2	(El Salvador) Firpo	4	2	1	1	7	3	+4	7	Advance to Quarter-finals	1–0	—	—	—	4–0
3	(Panama) Plaza Amador	4	2	0	2	10	10	0	6		—	2–1	—	5–2	—
4	(Guatemala) Xelajú	4	1	1	2	5	7	−2	4		—	1–1	—	—	2–0
5	(Nicaragua) Diriangén	4	1	0	3	5	11	−6	3		1–3	—	4–2	—	—

Source: CONCACAF
28 July 2026
22:00 (20:00 UTC−6)

Diriangén (Nicaragua)	4–2	(Panama) Plaza Amador
Coronel 5'; Rojas 15'; Barja 27'; Velásquez 67'	Report	Ríos 82'; Quintero 90'

Nicaragua National Football Stadium, Managua
Referee: Myriam Marcotte (Canada)
29 July 2026
22:00 (20:00 UTC−6)

Alajuelense (Costa Rica)	1–0	(Guatemala) Xelajú
Cisneros 75'	Report

Estadio Alejandro Morera Soto, Alajuela
Referee: Jaime Alfredo Herrera (El Salvador)

4 August 2026
20:00 (19:00 UTC−5)

Plaza Amador (Panama)	2–1	(El Salvador) Firpo
Sánchez 45'; J. Rodríguez 87'	Report	Cerritos 90+4'

Estadio Rommel Fernández, Panama City
Referee: Jonathan Leiton (Costa Rica)
4 August 2026
22:00 (20:00 UTC−6)

Diriangén (Nicaragua)	1–3	(Costa Rica) Alajuelense
C. Reyes 3'	Report	Ruiz 9'; Cisneros 48'; A. Hernández 90+5'

Nicaragua National Football Stadium, Managua
Referee: Orlando Alvarado (Guatemala)

11 August 2026
20:00 (19:00 UTC−5)

Plaza Amador (Panama)	5–2	(Guatemala) Xelajú
Rose 43', 45+3'; Y. Murillo 64'; D. Murillo 68'; M. Álvarez 76' (o.g.)	Report	Cárdenas 29'; Casas 52'

Estadio Rommel Fernández, Panama City
Referee: Julio Edgardo Guity Nunez (Honduras)
13 August 2026
22:00 (20:00 UTC−6)

Firpo (El Salvador)	4–0	(Nicaragua) Diriangén
Águila 16'; Cerritos 43'; Ortez 52'; Valencia 85'	Report

Estadio Las Delicias, Santa Tecla
Referee: Diego Ojer (Guatemala)

18 August 2026
23:00 (21:00 UTC−6)

Xelajú (Guatemala)	2–0	(Nicaragua) Diriangén
Casas 16'; Aparicio 76'	Report

Estadio Cementos Progreso, Guatemala City
Referee: Nelson Salgado (Honduras)
20 August 2026
23:00 (21:00 UTC−6)

Firpo (El Salvador)	1–0	(Costa Rica) Alajuelense
Vásquez 45'	Report

Estadio Las Delicias, Santa Tecla
Referee: Jesús Rafael López Valle (Mexico)

26 August 2026
22:30 (20:30 UTC−6)

Alajuelense (Costa Rica)	3–1	(Panama) Plaza Amador
Ruiz 49'; Cisneros 62' (pen.), 79'	Report	Rose 51'

Estadio Alejandro Morera Soto, Alajuela
Referee: Víctor Alfonso Cáceres Hernández (Mexico)
26 August 2026
22:30 (20:30 UTC−6)

Xelajú (Guatemala)	1–1	(El Salvador) Firpo
Casas 12'	Report	Ortez 21'

Estadio Cementos Progreso, Guatemala City
Referee: Michael Venne (Canada)

=== Group B ===
Pos	Team	Pld	W	D	L	GF	GA	GD	Pts	Qualification	ALI	MAR	HER	EST	ANT
1	(El Salvador) Alianza	4	3	0	1	5	4	+1	9	Advance to Quarter-finals	—	—	1–0	—	2–1
2	(Honduras) Marathón	4	2	1	1	6	1	+5	7	Advance to Quarter-finals	0–1	—	—	3–0	—
3	(Costa Rica) Herediano	4	2	1	1	4	2	+2	7		—	0–0	—	—	2–1
4	(Nicaragua) Real Estelí	4	2	0	2	5	6	−1	6		3–1	—	0–2	—	—
5	(Guatemala) Antigua	4	0	0	4	2	9	−7	0		—	0–3	—	0–2	—

Source: CONCACAF
29 July 2026
22:00 (20:00 UTC−6)

Alianza (El Salvador)	2–1	(Guatemala) Antigua
Osorio 30'; Parra 85' (pen.)	Report	Castellanos 76'

Estadio Cuscatlán, San Salvador
Referee: Brayan Cruz (Costa Rica)
30 July 2026
21:00 (19:00 UTC−6)

Herediano (Costa Rica)	0–0	(Honduras) Marathón
	Report

Estadio Alejandro Morera Soto, Alajuela
Referee: Diego Ojer (Guatemala)

4 August 2026
22:00 (20:00 UTC−6)

Antigua (Guatemala)	0–2	(Nicaragua) Real Estelí
	Report	Barrera 40'; Castillo 87'

Estadio Pensativo, Antigua Guatemala
Referee: Ismael Cornejo (El Salvador)
5 August 2026
22:00 (20:00 UTC−6)

Alianza (El Salvador)	1–0	(Costa Rica) Herediano
Romero 46'	Report

Estadio Cuscatlán, San Salvador
Referee: Fernando Javier Moron Valdelamar (Panama)

11 August 2026
22:00 (20:00 UTC−6)

Real Estelí (Nicaragua)	3–1	(El Salvador) Alianza
Aranda 4'; Casado 29'; Gutiérrez 89'	Report	Souza 64'

Estadio Independencia, Estelí
Referee: Guido Gonzales Jr. (United States)
13 August 2026
22:00 (20:00 UTC−6)

Antigua (Guatemala)	0–3	(Honduras) Marathón
	Report	Messiniti 47'; Moreno 57'; Ramírez 75'

Estadio Pensativo, Antigua Guatemala
Referee: Cesar Nolasco (El Salvador)

18 August 2026
23:00 (21:00 UTC−6)

Real Estelí (Nicaragua)	0–2	(Costa Rica) Herediano
	Report	Aguilar 21'; Acosta 73' (o.g.)

Estadio Independencia, Estelí
Referee: Jorge Leira (Panama)
19 August 2026
21:00 (19:00 UTC−6)

Marathón (Honduras)	0–1	(El Salvador) Alianza
	Report	Mier 62'

Estadio General Francisco Morazán, San Pedro Sula
Referee: Josué David Ugalde Aguilar (Costa Rica)

26 August 2026
20:30 (18:30 UTC−6)

Herediano (Costa Rica)	2–1	(Guatemala) Antigua
Araya 52'; Hudson 71'	Report	Ardón 69'

Estadio Nacional, San José
Referee: Filiberto Martinez (El Salvador)
26 August 2026
20:30 (18:30 UTC−6)

Marathón (Honduras)	3–0	(Nicaragua) Real Estelí
Farioli 43'; Arriaga 53'; Moreno 90+1'	Report

Estadio General Francisco Morazán, San Pedro Sula
Referee: Cristhofer Corado (Guatemala)

=== Group C ===
Pos	Team	Pld	W	D	L	GF	GA	GD	Pts	Qualification	OLI	SAP	MIX	AFC	UME
1	(Honduras) Olimpia	4	4	0	0	9	3	+6	12	Advance to Quarter-finals	—	2–1	2–0	—	—
2	(Costa Rica) Saprissa	4	3	0	1	8	4	+4	9	Advance to Quarter-finals	—	—	3–0	2–1	—
3	(Guatemala) Mixco	4	2	0	2	6	6	0	6		—	—	—	2–0	4–1
4	(Panama) Alianza	4	1	0	3	3	7	−4	3		1–3	—	—	—	1–0
5	(Panama) UMECIT	4	0	0	4	3	9	−6	0		1–2	1–2	—	—	—

Source: CONCACAF
28 July 2026
22:00 (20:00 UTC−6)

Olimpia (Honduras)	2–0	(Guatemala) Mixco
Benguché 27'; E. Rodríguez 80'	Report

Estadio Nacional Chelato Uclés, Tegucigalpa
Referee: Richard Tejada (Panama)
29 July 2026
20:00 (19:00 UTC−5)

UMECIT (Panama)	1–2	(Costa Rica) Saprissa
Saldaña 76'	Report	M. Torres 45+1'; Sinclair 49'

Estadio Universidad Latina, Penonomé
Referee: Raúl Castro (Honduras)

5 August 2026
20:00 (19:00 UTC−5)

UMECIT (Panama)	1–2	(Honduras) Olimpia
Peralta 5'	Report	R. García 22'; Enriquez 83'

Estadio Universidad Latina, Penonomé
Referee: José Corporán (Dominican Republic)
5 August 2026
22:00 (20:00 UTC−6)

Saprissa (Costa Rica)	2–1	(Panama) Alianza
M. Torres 19'; Sinclair 88'	Report	Garces 70'

Estadio Ricardo Saprissa Aymá, San José
Referee: Diego Ojer (Guatemala)

11 August 2026
22:00 (20:00 UTC−6)

Saprissa (Costa Rica)	3–0	(Guatemala) Mixco
Williams 4'; G. Torres 7'; Waston 32'	Report

Estadio Ricardo Saprissa Aymá, San José
Referee: Ismael Rosario López Peñuelas (Mexico)
13 August 2026
20:00 (19:00 UTC−5)

Alianza (Panama)	1–0	(Panama) UMECIT
Mendoza 30'	Report

Estadio Rommel Fernández, Panama City
Referee: José Valladares (Honduras)

19 August 2026
21:00 (19:00 UTC−6)

Mixco (Guatemala)	4–1	(Panama) UMECIT
Martínez 16', 25'; L. García 20'; Pozuelos 34'	Report	Gómez 60'

Estadio El Trébol, Guatemala City
Referee: Félix Mojica (Nicaragua)
20 August 2026
21:00 (20:00 UTC−5)

Alianza (Panama)	1–3	(Honduras) Olimpia
Stewart 76'	Report	Enriquez 42'; Benguché 71'; Chirinos 80'

Estadio Rommel Fernández, Panama City
Referee: Jorge Abraham Camacho Peregrina (Mexico)

27 August 2026
22:30 (20:30 UTC−6)

Olimpia (Honduras)	2–1	(Costa Rica) Saprissa
E. Hernández 12'; Benguché 69'	Report	M. Torres 75'

Estadio Nacional Chelato Uclés, Tegucigalpa
Referee: Fernando Javier Moron Valdelamar (Panama)
27 August 2026
22:30 (20:30 UTC−6)

Mixco (Guatemala)	2–0	(Panama) Alianza
Martínez 4'; Bolaños 83'	Report

Estadio El Trébol, Guatemala City
Referee: Jefferson Escobar (Honduras)

=== Group D ===
Pos	Team	Pld	W	D	L	GF	GA	GD	Pts	Qualification	CAR	MOT	MUN	FAS	VER
1	(Costa Rica) Cartaginés	4	2	2	0	8	2	+6	8 (Note: Fair play points: Cartaginés –6, Motagua –8.)	Advance to Quarter-finals	—	—	—	2–0	4–0
2	(Honduras) Motagua	4	2	2	0	8	2	+6	8	Advance to Quarter-finals	1–1	—	—	1–0	—
3	(Guatemala) Municipal	4	1	3	0	4	3	+1	6		1–1	1–1	—	—	—
4	(El Salvador) FAS	4	1	1	2	5	5	0	4		—	—	1–1	—	4–1
5	(Belize) Verdes	4	0	0	4	1	14	−13	0		—	0–5	0–1	—	—

Source: CONCACAF
Notes:
28 July 2026
20:00 (18:00 UTC−6)

Verdes (Belize)	0–5	(Honduras) Motagua
	Report	Vega 7'; Meléndez 49'; Moya 63', 75'; J. García 90+2'

FFB Stadium, Belmopan
Referee: Orlando Alvarado (Guatemala)
30 July 2026
23:00 (21:00 UTC−6)

Municipal (Guatemala)	1–1	(Costa Rica) Cartaginés
Mena 44'	Report	Cordero 23'

Estadio El Trébol, Guatemala City
Referee: José Valladares (Honduras)

6 August 2026
21:00 (19:00 UTC−6)

Verdes (Belize)	0–1	(Guatemala) Municipal
	Report	Cabeza 18'

FFB Stadium, Belmopan
Referee: Deily Gómez (Costa Rica)
6 August 2026
23:00 (21:00 UTC−6)

Motagua (Honduras)	1–0	(El Salvador) FAS
Olivera 62'	Report

Estadio Nacional Chelato Uclés, Tegucigalpa
Referee: Brayan Cruz (Costa Rica)

12 August 2026
21:00 (19:00 UTC−6)

Motagua (Honduras)	1–1	(Costa Rica) Cartaginés
Mesén 42' (o.g.)	Report	González 18'

Estadio Nacional Chelato Uclés, Tegucigalpa
Referee: Jorge Leira (Panama)
12 August 2026
23:00 (21:00 UTC−6)

FAS (El Salvador)	4–1	(Belize) Verdes
M. Murillo 4'; Nolasco 36'; Medrano 57'; Urbina 90+1'	Report	Ibarra 34'

Estadio Las Delicias, Santa Tecla
Referee: Roger Alexander Meléndez Suárez (Nicaragua)

18 August 2026
21:00 (19:00 UTC−6)

Cartaginés (Costa Rica)	4–0	(Belize) Verdes
Mesén 8'; R. Hernandez 42'; G. Castro 90', 90+4'	Report

Estadio José Rafael Fello Meza Ivankovich, Cartago
Referee: Sergio Reyna (Guatemala)
19 August 2026
23:00 (21:00 UTC−6)

FAS (El Salvador)	1–1	(Guatemala) Municipal
Cruz 36'	Report	C. Hernández 44' (pen.)

Estadio Cuscatlán, San Salvador
Referee: David Gómez (Costa Rica)

25 August 2026
22:30 (20:30 UTC−6)

Municipal (Guatemala)	1–1	(Honduras) Motagua
López 76'	Report	Olivera 36'

Estadio El Trébol, Guatemala City
Referee: Josué David Ugalde Aguilar (Costa Rica)
25 August 2026
22:30 (20:30 UTC−6)

Cartaginés (Costa Rica)	2–0	(El Salvador) FAS
G. Castro 61'; A. Hernández 78'	Report

Estadio José Rafael Fello Meza Ivankovich, Cartago
Referee: Julio Luna Guzmán (Guatemala)
