= 2026 CONCACAF Central American Cup =

Fourth edition of the CONCACAF Central American Cup

- CONCACAF Central American Cup logo

Tournament details
- Dates: 28 July – 6 December 2026
- Teams: 20 (from 7 associations)

Tournament statistics
- Matches played: 56
- Goals scored: 151 (2.7 per match)
- Top scorer(s): (Mexico) Ronaldo Cisneros (4 goals)
- All statistics correct as of 29 October 2026.

The 2026 CONCACAF Central American Cup is the fourth edition of the CONCACAF Central American Cup, the first-tier annual international club football competition in the Central American region. It is contested by clubs whose football associations are affiliated with the Central American Football Union (UNCAF), a sub-confederation of CONCACAF. The competition takes place from 28 July to 6 December 2026.

Alajuelense are the three-time defending champions, having won the first three editions of the tournament, most recently defeating Xelajú in the 2025 final.

The four semi-finalists and the two play-in winners will qualify for the 2027 CONCACAF Champions Cup. The tournament champions will receive a bye to the Champions Cup round of 16, while the remaining five qualified clubs will enter in round one.

== Teams ==
Twenty teams from the seven UNCAF member associations qualified for the tournament based on their results in their respective domestic competitions.

The allocation of slots for this edition was as follows:

- Costa Rica and Guatemala: 4 berths
- El Salvador, Honduras and Panama: 3 berths
- Nicaragua: 2 berths
- Belize: 1 berth

Association	Team	Qualifying method
Belize (1 berth)	Verdes	2025–26 Premier League of Belize Apertura champions with the most points accumulated in the overall standings
Costa Rica (4 berths)	Alajuelense	2025–26 Liga FPD Apertura champions
Costa Rica (4 berths)	Herediano	2025–26 Liga FPD Clausura champions
Costa Rica (4 berths)	Saprissa	2025–26 Liga FPD best club in the overall standings not otherwise qualified
Costa Rica (4 berths)	Cartaginés	2025–26 Liga FPD next best club in the overall standings not otherwise qualified
El Salvador (3 berths)	L.A. Firpo	2025–26 Primera División de El Salvador Apertura champions
El Salvador (3 berths)	FAS	2025–26 Primera División de El Salvador Clausura champions
El Salvador (3 berths)	Alianza	2025–26 Primera División de El Salvador best club in the overall standings not otherwise qualified
Guatemala (4 berths)	Antigua	2025–26 Liga Nacional de Guatemala Apertura champions
Guatemala (4 berths)	Municipal	2025–26 Liga Nacional de Guatemala Clausura champions and Apertura runners-up
Guatemala (4 berths)	Xelajú	2025–26 Liga Nacional de Guatemala Clausura runners-up
Guatemala (4 berths)	Mixco	2025–26 Liga Nacional de Guatemala best club in the overall standings not otherwise qualified
Honduras (3 berths)	Olimpia	2025–26 Honduran Liga Nacional Apertura champions
Honduras (3 berths)	Motagua	2025–26 Honduran Liga Nacional Clausura champions
Honduras (3 berths)	Marathón	2025–26 Honduran Liga Nacional best club in the overall standings not otherwise qualified
Nicaragua (2 berths)	Diriangén	2025–26 Liga Primera de Nicaragua Apertura champions
Nicaragua (2 berths)	Real Estelí	2025–26 Liga Primera de Nicaragua Clausura finalists
Panama (3 berths)	Plaza Amador	2025 Liga Panameña de Fútbol Clausura champions
Panama (3 berths)	Alianza	2025–26 Liga Panameña de Fútbol best club in the overall standings not otherwise qualified
Panama (3 berths)	UMECIT	2025–26 Liga Panameña de Fútbol next best club in the overall standings not otherwise qualified

== Draw ==
The draw for the group stage was held on 26 May 2026, at 20:00 ET (UTC−4), in Miami, Florida, United States. The 20 involved teams were previously seeded into five pots of four teams each based on their CONCACAF Club Ranking as of 25 May 2026.

Pot 1
Team	Rank
(Costa Rica) Alajuelense	39
(Costa Rica) Herediano	42
(Honduras) Olimpia	43
(Guatemala) Municipal	45

Pot 2
Team	Rank
(Costa Rica) Saprissa	46
(Panama) Plaza Amador	55
(Guatemala) Antigua	57
(Honduras) Motagua	58

Pot 3
Team	Rank
(Guatemala) Xelajú	59
(Costa Rica) Cartaginés	60
(Honduras) Marathón	62
(Guatemala) Mixco	64

Pot 4
Team	Rank
(Panama) Alianza	68
(El Salvador) Firpo	71
(Nicaragua) Real Estelí	72
(El Salvador) FAS	75

Pot 5
Team	Rank
(Nicaragua) Diriangén	80
(El Salvador) Alianza	82
(Panama) UMECIT	88
(Belize) Verdes	182

For the group stage, the 20 teams were drawn into four groups (Groups A–D) of five containing a team from each of the five pots. Teams from pot 1 were drawn first and were placed in the first position of their group, starting from Group A to Group D. The same procedure was followed for teams from pots 2, 3, 4 and 5, and they were placed in positions 2, 3, 4 and 5, respectively, within the group to which they were drawn. Each group must contain no more than two clubs from the same national association.

== Schedule ==
The schedule of the competition is as follows.

Stage	Round	First leg or match dates	Second leg
Group stage	Matchday 1	28–30 July	
Group stage	Matchday 2	4–6 August	
Group stage	Matchday 3	11–13 August	
Group stage	Matchday 4	18–20 August	
Group stage	Matchday 5	25–27 August	
Knockout stage	Quarter-finals	8–10 September	15–17 September
Knockout stage	Semi-finals and play-in	20–22 October	27–29 October
Knockout stage	Final	2 December	6 December

== Group stage ==
In the group stage, each group is played on a single home-and-away round-robin basis, with teams playing against each other once, for a total of four matches per team (two home and two away). The winners and runners-up of each group advanced to the quarter-finals of the knockout stage.

=== Group A ===
Pos	Team	Pld	W	D	L	GF	GA	GD	Pts	Qualification	ALA	FIR	PLA	XEL	DIR
1	(Costa Rica) Alajuelense	4	3	0	1	7	3	+4	9	Advance to Quarter-finals	—	—	3–1	1–0	—
2	(El Salvador) Firpo	4	2	1	1	7	3	+4	7	Advance to Quarter-finals	1–0	—	—	—	4–0
3	(Panama) Plaza Amador	4	2	0	2	10	10	0	6		—	2–1	—	5–2	—
4	(Guatemala) Xelajú	4	1	1	2	5	7	−2	4		—	1–1	—	—	2–0
5	(Nicaragua) Diriangén	4	1	0	3	5	11	−6	3		1–3	—	4–2	—	—

Source: CONCACAF
Rules for classification: 1) Points; 2) Goal difference; 3) Goals scored; 4) Head-to-head results (points, goal difference, goals scored); 5) Fair play points; 6) Drawing of lots.

=== Group B ===
Pos	Team	Pld	W	D	L	GF	GA	GD	Pts	Qualification	ALI	MAR	HER	EST	ANT
1	(El Salvador) Alianza	4	3	0	1	5	4	+1	9	Advance to Quarter-finals	—	—	1–0	—	2–1
2	(Honduras) Marathón	4	2	1	1	6	1	+5	7	Advance to Quarter-finals	0–1	—	—	3–0	—
3	(Costa Rica) Herediano	4	2	1	1	4	2	+2	7		—	0–0	—	—	2–1
4	(Nicaragua) Real Estelí	4	2	0	2	5	6	−1	6		3–1	—	0–2	—	—
5	(Guatemala) Antigua	4	0	0	4	2	9	−7	0		—	0–3	—	0–2	—

Source: CONCACAF
Rules for classification: 1) Points; 2) Goal difference; 3) Goals scored; 4) Head-to-head results (points, goal difference, goals scored); 5) Fair play points; 6) Drawing of lots.

=== Group C ===
Pos	Team	Pld	W	D	L	GF	GA	GD	Pts	Qualification	OLI	SAP	MIX	AFC	UME
1	(Honduras) Olimpia	4	4	0	0	9	3	+6	12	Advance to Quarter-finals	—	2–1	2–0	—	—
2	(Costa Rica) Saprissa	4	3	0	1	8	4	+4	9	Advance to Quarter-finals	—	—	3–0	2–1	—
3	(Guatemala) Mixco	4	2	0	2	6	6	0	6		—	—	—	2–0	4–1
4	(Panama) Alianza	4	1	0	3	3	7	−4	3		1–3	—	—	—	1–0
5	(Panama) UMECIT	4	0	0	4	3	9	−6	0		1–2	1–2	—	—	—

Source: CONCACAF
Rules for classification: 1) Points; 2) Goal difference; 3) Goals scored; 4) Head-to-head results (points, goal difference, goals scored); 5) Fair play points; 6) Drawing of lots.

=== Group D ===
Pos	Team	Pld	W	D	L	GF	GA	GD	Pts	Qualification	CAR	MOT	MUN	FAS	VER
1	(Costa Rica) Cartaginés	4	2	2	0	8	2	+6	8 (Note: Fair play points: Cartaginés –6, Motagua –8.)	Advance to Quarter-finals	—	—	—	2–0	4–0
2	(Honduras) Motagua	4	2	2	0	8	2	+6	8	Advance to Quarter-finals	1–1	—	—	1–0	—
3	(Guatemala) Municipal	4	1	3	0	4	3	+1	6		1–1	1–1	—	—	—
4	(El Salvador) FAS	4	1	1	2	5	5	0	4		—	—	1–1	—	4–1
5	(Belize) Verdes	4	0	0	4	1	14	−13	0		—	0–5	0–1	—	—

Source: CONCACAF
Rules for classification: 1) Points; 2) Goal difference; 3) Goals scored; 4) Head-to-head results (points, goal difference, goals scored); 5) Fair play points; 6) Drawing of lots.

== Knockout stage ==
The knockout stage will be played in a single-elimination tournament with the following rules:

- Each tie is played on a home-and-away two-legged basis. The home team of the second leg in each tie will be determined separately for each round as follows (Regulations Article 12.12):
  - In the quarter-finals, the group winners will host the second leg.
  - In the semi-finals and play-in, the higher-ranked teams based on total points accumulated in the group stage and the quarterfinals will host the second leg.
  - In the finals, the higher-ranked team based on total points accumulated in the group stage, quarterfinals and semi-finals will host the second leg.
- In each round, if tied on aggregate, the away goals rule would be used. If still tied, 30 minutes of extra time would be played but the away goals scored during this time would not serve as a tie-breaking criteria. If still tied after extra time, the penalty shoot-out would be used to determine the winner (Regulations Article 12.11.2.1).

=== Qualified teams ===
Group	Winners	Runners-up
A	(Costa Rica) Alajuelense	(El Salvador) Firpo
B	(El Salvador) Alianza	(Honduras) Marathón
C	(Honduras) Olimpia	(Costa Rica) Saprissa
D	(Costa Rica) Cartaginés	(Honduras) Motagua

=== Seeding ===
Teams will be seeded 1–8 based on results in the group stage and assigned a position in a fixed bracket. For each round, the host of the second leg will be determined based on performance in all previous rounds, including the group stage.

The following was the seeding for the quarter-finals round only:

Seed	Grp	Team	Pld	W	D	L	GF	GA	GD	Pts	Matchups
1	C	(Honduras) Olimpia	4	4	0	0	9	3	+6	12	Match QF1
2	A	(Costa Rica) Alajuelense	4	3	0	1	7	3	+4	9	Match QF3
3	B	(El Salvador) Alianza	4	3	0	1	5	4	+1	9	Match QF4
4	D	(Costa Rica) Cartaginés	4	2	2	0	8	2	+6	8	Match QF2
5	C	(Costa Rica) Saprissa	4	3	0	1	8	4	+4	9	Match QF2
6	D	(Honduras) Motagua	4	2	2	0	8	2	+6	8	Match QF4
7	B	(Honduras) Marathón	4	2	1	1	6	1	+5	7	Match QF3
8	A	(El Salvador) Firpo	4	2	1	1	7	3	+4	7	Match QF1

Source: CONCACAF
Rules for classification: 1) Points; 2) Goal difference; 3) Goals scored; 4) Away goals scored; 5) Wins; 6) Away wins; 7) Disciplinary points (1 point for yellow card, 3 points for second yellow card/indirect red card, 4 points for direct red card, 5 points for yellow card and direct red card); 8) Drawing of lots (Regulations Article 12.11.4).

=== Bracket ===
The bracket was decided based on the quarter-finals seeding.

Play-in
(Honduras) Marathón	2	0	2
(El Salvador) Alianza	1	0	1
(Costa Rica) Saprissa	0	2	2
(El Salvador) Firpo	0	1	1

Quarter-finals
7	(Honduras) Marathón	2	1	3
2	(Costa Rica) Alajuelense	2	3	5
6	(Honduras) Motagua	3	0	3
3	(El Salvador) Alianza	0	0	0
5	(Costa Rica) Saprissa	2	2	4
4	(Costa Rica) Cartaginés	2	3	5
8	(El Salvador) Firpo	0	0	0
1	(Honduras) Olimpia	3	3	6

Semi-finals
(Costa Rica) Alajuelense	0	2	2
(Honduras) Motagua	0	1	1
(Costa Rica) Cartaginés	1	2	3
(Honduras) Olimpia	0	2	2

Finals
(Costa Rica) Alajuelense
(Costa Rica) Cartaginés

=== Quarter-finals ===
The first legs will be played from 8 to 10 September, and the second legs from 15 to 17 September 2026.

Team 1	Agg.	Team 2	1st leg	2nd leg
Olimpia (Honduras)	6–0	(El Salvador) Firpo	3–0	3–0
Cartaginés (Costa Rica)	5–4	(Costa Rica) Saprissa	2–2	3–2
Alajuelense (Costa Rica)	5–3	(Honduras) Marathón	2–2	3–1
Alianza (El Salvador)	0–3	(Honduras) Motagua	0–3	0–0

=== Play-in ===
Team 1	Agg.	Team 2	1st leg	2nd leg
Firpo (El Salvador)	1–2	(Costa Rica) Saprissa	0–0	1–2
Marathón (Honduras)	2–1	(El Salvador) Alianza	2–1	0–0

=== Semi-finals ===
Team 1	Agg.	Team 2	1st leg	2nd leg
Olimpia (Honduras)	2–3	(Costa Rica) Cartaginés	0–1	2–2
Alajuelense (Costa Rica)	2–1	(Honduras) Motagua	0–0	2–1

=== Finals ===
Team 1	Agg.	Team 2	1st leg	2nd leg
Cartaginés (Costa Rica)	F	(Costa Rica) Alajuelense	2 Dec	6 Dec

== Top goalscorers ==
Team eliminated for this round.
Team inactive for this round.

As of 26 October 2026

Rank	Player	Team	GS1	GS2	GS3	GS4	GS5	QF1	QF2	PI1	PI2	SF1	SF2	F1	F2	Total
1	(Mexico) Ronaldo Cisneros	(Costa Rica) Alajuelense	1	1			2		1							5
1	(Costa Rica) Geancarlo Castro	(Costa Rica) Cartaginés				2	1	1					1			5
3	(Costa Rica) Orlando Sinclair	(Costa Rica) Saprissa	1	1				1	1							4
3	(Honduras) Jorge Benguché	(Honduras) Olimpia	1			1	1						1			4
5	(Panama) Everardo Rose	(Panama) Plaza Amador			2		1									3
5	(Uruguay) Diego Casas	(Guatemala) Xelajú			1	1	1									3
5	(Argentina) Mariano Torres	(Costa Rica) Saprissa	1	1			1									3
5	(Argentina) Nicolas Martínez	(Guatemala) Mixco				2	1									3
5	(Colombia) Yairo Moreno	(Honduras) Marathón			1		1	1								3
5	(Mexico) José González	(Costa Rica) Cartaginés			1			1	1							3
5	(Costa Rica) Diego Mesén	(Costa Rica) Cartaginés			1	1			1							3
5	(Argentina) Nicolás Messiniti	(Honduras) Marathón			1				1	1						3
5	(Honduras) Damin Ramírez	(Honduras) Marathón			1				1	1						3
5	(El Salvador) Mauricio Cerritos	(El Salvador) Firpo		1	1						1					3
5	(United States) Alonso Hernández	(Costa Rica) Cartaginés					1					1	1			3
16	(Costa Rica) John Ruiz	(Costa Rica) Alajuelense		1			1									2
16	(El Salvador) Diego Ortez	(El Salvador) Firpo			1		1									2
16	(Argentina) Imanol Enríquez	(Honduras) Olimpia		1		1										2
16	(Costa Rica) Jonathan Moya	(Honduras) Motagua	2													2
16	(Uruguay) Rodrigo de Olivera	(Honduras) Motagua		1			1									2
16	(Costa Rica) Anthony Hernández	(Costa Rica) Alajuelense		1				1								2
16	(El Salvador) Harold Osorio	(El Salvador) Alianza	1							1						2
16	(Costa Rica) Gerson Torres	(Costa Rica) Saprissa			1						1					2

== See also ==
- 2026 CONCACAF Caribbean Cup
- 2026 Leagues Cup
- 2027 CONCACAF Champions Cup
