= 2026 CONCACAF Central American Cup knockout stage =

International football competition

The 2026 CONCACAF Central American Cup knockout stage is being played from 8 September to 6 December 2026. A total of eight teams are competing in the knockout stage to decide the champions of the 2026 CONCACAF Central American Cup.

== Qualified teams ==
The top two teams from each group advanced to the knockout stage.

Group	Winners	Runners-up
A	(Costa Rica) Alajuelense	(El Salvador) Firpo
B	(El Salvador) Alianza	(Honduras) Marathón
C	(Honduras) Olimpia	(Costa Rica) Saprissa
D	(Costa Rica) Cartaginés	(Honduras) Motagua

=== Seeding ===
Teams were seeded 1–8 based on results in the group stage and assigned a position in a fixed bracket. For each round, the host of the second leg will be determined based on performance in all previous rounds, including the group stage.

== Format ==
The knockout stage will be played in a single-elimination tournament with the following rules:

- Each tie is played on a home-and-away two-legged basis. The home team of the second leg in each tie will be determined separately for each round as follows (Regulations Article 12.12):
  - In the quarter-finals, the group winners hosted the second leg.
  - In the semi-finals and play-in, the higher-ranked teams based on total points accumulated in the group stage and the quarter-finals hosted the second leg.
  - In the finals, the higher-ranked team based on total points accumulated in the group stage, quarter-finals and semi-finals will host the second leg.
- In each round, if tied on aggregate, the away goals rule will be used. If still tied, 30 minutes of extra time will be played, but the away goals scored during this time will not serve as a tie-breaking criteria. If still tied after extra time, a penalty shoot-out will be used to determine the winner (Regulations Article 12.11.2.1).

== Bracket ==
The bracket of the final stages was determined as follows:

Round	Matchups
Quarter-finals	(Group winner team host second leg): Match QF1: Team seeded 1 vs. Team seeded 8; Match QF2: Team seeded 4 vs. Team seeded 5; Match QF3: Team seeded 2 vs. Team seeded 7; Match QF4: Team seeded 3 vs. Team seeded 6
Play-in round	(Higher-ranked team in each tie host second leg): Match PI1: Loser QF1 vs. Loser QF2; Match PI2: Loser QF3 vs. Loser QF4
Semi-finals	(Higher-ranked team in each tie host second leg): Match SF1: Winner QF1 vs. Winner QF2; Match SF2: Winner QF3 vs. Winner QF4
Finals	(Higher-ranked team host second leg): Winner SF1 vs. Winner SF2

The bracket was decided based on the quarter-finals seeding.

Play-in
(Honduras) Marathón	2	0	2
(El Salvador) Alianza	1	0	1
(Costa Rica) Saprissa	0	2	2
(El Salvador) Firpo	0	1	1

Quarter-finals
7	(Honduras) Marathón	2	1	3
2	(Costa Rica) Alajuelense	2	3	5
6	(Honduras) Motagua	3	0	3
3	(El Salvador) Alianza	0	0	0
5	(Costa Rica) Saprissa	2	2	4
4	(Costa Rica) Cartaginés	2	3	5
8	(El Salvador) Firpo	0	0	0
1	(Honduras) Olimpia	3	3	6

Semi-finals
(Costa Rica) Alajuelense	0	2	2
(Honduras) Motagua	0	1	1
(Costa Rica) Cartaginés	1	2	3
(Honduras) Olimpia	0	2	2

Finals
(Costa Rica) Alajuelense
(Costa Rica) Cartaginés

== Quarter-finals ==
In the quarter-finals, the teams were seeded based on their results in the group stage, with the group winners seeded 1–4, and the group runners-up seeded 5–8. The group winners hosted the second leg.

Seed	Grp	Team	Pld	W	D	L	GF	GA	GD	Pts	Matchups
1	C	(Honduras) Olimpia	4	4	0	0	9	3	+6	12	Match QF1
2	A	(Costa Rica) Alajuelense	4	3	0	1	7	3	+4	9	Match QF3
3	B	(El Salvador) Alianza	4	3	0	1	5	4	+1	9	Match QF4
4	D	(Costa Rica) Cartaginés	4	2	2	0	8	2	+6	8	Match QF2
5	C	(Costa Rica) Saprissa	4	3	0	1	8	4	+4	9	Match QF2
6	D	(Honduras) Motagua	4	2	2	0	8	2	+6	8	Match QF4
7	B	(Honduras) Marathón	4	2	1	1	6	1	+5	7	Match QF3
8	A	(El Salvador) Firpo	4	2	1	1	7	3	+4	7	Match QF1

Source: CONCACAF
Rules for classification: 1) Points; 2) Goal difference; 3) Goals scored; 4) Away goals scored; 5) Wins; 6) Away wins; 7) Disciplinary points (1 point for yellow card, 3 points for second yellow card/indirect red card, 4 points for direct red card, 5 points for yellow card and direct red card); 8) Drawing of lots (Regulations Article 12.11.4).

=== Summary ===
The first legs will be played from 8 to 10 September, and the second legs from 15 to 17 September 2026.

Team 1	Agg.	Team 2	1st leg	2nd leg
Olimpia (Honduras)	6–0	(El Salvador) Firpo	3–0	3–0
Cartaginés (Costa Rica)	5–4	(Costa Rica) Saprissa	2–2	3–2
Alajuelense (Costa Rica)	5–3	(Honduras) Marathón	2–2	3–1
Alianza (El Salvador)	0–3	(Honduras) Motagua	0–3	0–0

=== Matches ===
10 September 2026
23:06 (21:06 UTC−6)

Firpo (El Salvador)	0–3	(Honduras) Olimpia
	Report	J. Álvarez 52'; Arboleda 53'; Dibble 85'

Cuscatlán Stadium, San Salvador
Referee: Félix Mojica (Nicaragua)
17 September 2026
23:15 (21:15 UTC−6)

Olimpia (Honduras)	3–0	(El Salvador) Firpo
E. Rodríguez 32' (pen.), 62'; Güity 49'	Report

Estadio Nacional Chelato Uclés, Tegucigalpa
Referee: Josué David Ugalde Aguilar (Costa Rica)

Olimpia won 6–0 on aggregate, advanced to the semi-finals (Match SF1) and qualified for the 2027 CONCACAF Champions Cup Round One, at minimum. Firpo advanced to the play-in.

9 September 2026
21:06 (19:06 UTC−6)

Saprissa (Costa Rica)	2–2	(Costa Rica) Cartaginés
Sinclair 36'; Guzmán 89'	Report	González 49'; G. Castro 59'

Estadio Ricardo Saprissa Aymá, San José
Referee: Nelson Salgado (Honduras)
16 September 2026
20:30 (18:30 UTC−6)

Cartaginés (Costa Rica)	3–2	(Costa Rica) Saprissa
González 22'; Mesén 77'; Alfaro 88' (pen.)	Report	Sinclair 48'; Escobar 57'

Estadio José Rafael Fello Meza Ivankovich, Cartago
Referee: Fernando Javier Moron Valdelamar (Panama)

Cartaginés won 5–4 on aggregate, advanced to the semi-finals (Match SF1) and qualified for the 2027 CONCACAF Champions Cup Round One, at minimum. Saprissa advanced to the play-in.

10 September 2026
21:06 (19:06 UTC−6)

Marathón (Honduras)	2–2	(Costa Rica) Alajuelense
Moreno 10'; Ramírez 50'	Report	A. Hernández 2'; Zaldivar 86'

Estadio General Francisco Morazán, San Pedro Sula
Referee: Jaime Alfredo Herrera (El Salvador)
17 September 2026
20:30 (18:30 UTC−6)

Alajuelense (Costa Rica)	3–1	(Honduras) Marathón
Lucumí 27'; Cisneros 32'; Matarrita 71' (pen.)	Report	Messiniti 68'

Estadio Alejandro Morera Soto, Alajuela
Referee: Jorge Leira (Panama)

Alajuelense won 5–3 on aggregate, advanced to the semi-finals (Match SF2) and qualified for the 2027 CONCACAF Champions Cup Round One, at minimum. Marathón advanced to the play-in.

9 September 2026
23:06 (21:06 UTC−6)

Motagua (Honduras)	3–0	(El Salvador) Alianza
Padilla 30'; Macías 54'; A. Reyes 86'	Report

Estadio Nacional Chelato Uclés, Tegucigalpa
Referee: Cristhofer Corado (Guatemala)
16 September 2026
23:15 (21:15 UTC−6)

Alianza (El Salvador)	0–0	(Honduras) Motagua
	Report

Estadio Cuscatlán, San Salvador
Referee: Jesús Rafael López Valle (Mexico)

Motagua won 3–0 on aggregate, advanced to the semi-finals (Match SF2) and qualified for the 2027 CONCACAF Champions Cup Round One, at minimum. Alianza advanced to the play-in.

== Play-in ==
The four quarter-final losers contested two two-legged play-in ties. The two winners qualified for the 2027 CONCACAF Champions Cup. The matches were played from 20 to 22 October and from 27 to 29 October 2026.

In the play-in, the teams in each tie which had the better performance across all previous rounds (group stage and quarter-finals) hosted the second leg.

Pos	Team	Pld	W	D	L	GF	GA	GD	Pts	Host
1 (PI1)	(Costa Rica) Saprissa	6	3	1	2	12	9	+3	10	Second leg
2 (PI1)	(El Salvador) Firpo	6	2	1	3	7	9	−2	7	First leg
1 (PI2)	(El Salvador) Alianza	6	3	1	2	5	7	−2	10	Second leg
2 (PI2)	(Honduras) Marathón	6	2	2	2	9	6	+3	8	First leg

Source: CONCACAF
Rules for classification: 1) Points; 2) Goal difference; 3) Goals scored; 4) Away goals scored; 5) Wins; 6) Away wins; 7) Disciplinary points (1 point for yellow card, 3 points for second yellow card/indirect red card, 4 points for direct red card, 5 points for yellow card and direct red card); 8) Drawing of lots (Regulations Article 12.11.1).

=== Summary ===
Team 1	Agg.	Team 2	1st leg	2nd leg
Firpo (El Salvador)	1–2	(Costa Rica) Saprissa	0–0	1–2
Marathón (Honduras)	2–1	(El Salvador) Alianza	2–1	0–0

=== Matches ===
21 October 2026
20:30 (18:30 UTC−6)

Firpo (El Salvador)	0–0	(Costa Rica) Saprissa
	Report

Estadio Jorge "El Mágico" González, San Salvador
Referee: Víctor Hernández (Mexico)
28 October 2026
20:30 (18:30 UTC−6)

Saprissa (Costa Rica)	2–1	(El Salvador) Firpo
G. Torres 33'; A. Rodríguez 90+5'	Report	Cerritos 70' (pen.)

Estadio Ricardo Saprissa Aymá, San José
Referee: Selvin Brown (Honduras)

Saprissa won 2–1 on aggregate and qualified for the 2027 CONCACAF Champions Cup Round One.

20 October 2026
22:00 (20:00 UTC−6)

Marathón (Honduras)	2–1	(El Salvador) Alianza
Messiniti 15'; Ramírez 22'	Report	Osorio 5'

Estadio Olímpico Metropolitano, San Pedro Sula
Referee: Steven Madrigal (Costa Rica)
27 October 2026
22:00 (20:00 UTC−6)

Alianza (El Salvador)	0–0	(Honduras) Marathón
	Report

Estadio Jorge "El Mágico" González, San Salvador
Referee: Keylor Herrera (Costa Rica)

Marathón won 2–1 on aggregate and qualified for the 2027 CONCACAF Champions Cup Round One.

== Semi-finals ==
The four quarter-final winners advanced to the semi-finals and qualified for the 2027 CONCACAF Champions Cup. The matches were played from 20 to 22 October and from 27 to 29 October 2026.

In the semi-finals, the team in each tie which had the better performance across all previous rounds (group stage and quarter-finals) hosted the second leg.

Pos	Team	Pld	W	D	L	GF	GA	GD	Pts	Host
1 (SF1)	(Honduras) Olimpia	6	6	0	0	15	3	+12	18	Second leg
2 (SF1)	(Costa Rica) Cartaginés	6	3	3	0	13	6	+7	12	First leg
1 (SF2)	(Costa Rica) Alajuelense	6	4	1	1	12	6	+6	13	Second leg
2 (SF2)	(Honduras) Motagua	6	3	3	0	11	2	+9	12	First leg

Source: CONCACAF
Rules for classification: 1) Points; 2) Goal difference; 3) Goals scored; 4) Away goals scored; 5) Wins; 6) Away wins; 7) Disciplinary points (1 point for yellow card, 3 points for second yellow card/indirect red card, 4 points for direct red card, 5 points for yellow card and direct red card); 8) Drawing of lots (Regulations Article 12.11.1).

=== Summary ===
Team 1	Agg.	Team 2	1st leg	2nd leg
Olimpia (Honduras)	2–3	(Costa Rica) Cartaginés	0–1	2–2
Alajuelense (Costa Rica)	2–1	(Honduras) Motagua	0–0	2–1

=== Matches ===
21 October 2026
22:30 (20:30 UTC−6)

Cartaginés (Costa Rica)	1–0	(Honduras) Olimpia
A. Hernández 14'	Report

Estadio José Rafael Fello Meza Ivankovich, Cartago
Referee: Bryan López (Guatemala)
28 October 2026
23:00 (21:00 UTC−6)

Olimpia (Honduras)	2–2	(Costa Rica) Cartaginés
Olivas 12' (o.g.); Benguché 52'	Report	A. Hernández 36'; G. Castro 90+5'

Estadio Nacional Chelato Uclés, Tegucigalpa
Referee: Adonis Carrasco (Dominican Republic)

Cartaginés won 3–2 on aggregate.

22 October 2026
21:00 (19:00 UTC−6)

Motagua (Honduras)	0–0	(Costa Rica) Alajuelense
	Report

Estadio Nacional Chelato Uclés, Tegucigalpa
Referee: Walter López Castellanos (Guatemala)
29 October 2026
22:00 (20:00 UTC−6)

Alajuelense (Costa Rica)	2–1	(Honduras) Motagua
Juanpi 19'; Pérez 43'	Report	Gamboa 74' (o.g.)

Estadio Alejandro Morera Soto, Alajuela
Referee: Guido Gonzales Jr. (United States)

Alajuelense won 2–1 on aggregate.

== Finals ==
The finals will be played over two legs on 2 and 6 December 2026. The champions will qualify directly to the round of 16 of the 2027 CONCACAF Champions Cup.

Pos	Team	Pld	W	D	L	GF	GA	GD	Pts	Host
1	(Costa Rica) Alajuelense	8	5	2	1	14	7	+7	17	Second leg
2	(Costa Rica) Cartaginés	8	4	4	0	16	8	+8	16	First leg

Source: CONCACAF
Rules for classification: 1) Points; 2) Goal difference; 3) Goals scored; 4) Away goals scored; 5) Wins; 6) Away wins; 7) Disciplinary points (1 point for yellow card, 3 points for second yellow card/indirect red card, 4 points for direct red card, 5 points for yellow card and direct red card); 8) Drawing of lots (Regulations Article 12.11.1).

=== Summary ===
Team 1	Agg.	Team 2	1st leg	2nd leg
Cartaginés (Costa Rica)	F	(Costa Rica) Alajuelense	2 Dec	6 Dec

=== Matches ===
2 December 2026
20:00

Cartaginés (Costa Rica)	v	(Costa Rica) Alajuelense
	Report

Estadio José Rafael Fello Meza Ivankovich, Cartago
6 December 2026
19:00

Alajuelense (Costa Rica)	v	(Costa Rica) Cartaginés
	Report

Estadio Alejandro Morera Soto, Alajuela
