= Arturo Bonilla =

Honduran footballer (born 1953)

Personal information
- Full name: Arturo Bonilla Torres
- Date of birth: 23 January 1953 (age 73)
- Place of birth: El Progreso, Yoro Department, Honduras
- Position: Attacking midfielder

Youth career
- ¿?–1968: Lenca
- 1968–1969: Morelia
- 1969–1971: Honduras El Progreso

Senior career*
Years	Team	Apps	(Gls)
1972–1985	Marathón	271	(57)

International career
1973–1975	Honduras		
- * Club domestic league appearances and goals

Arturo Bonilla Torres (born 23 January 1953) is a Honduran retired football midfielder.

He currently lives in Pompano Beach, Florida, where he works in the family boating business.

== Club career ==
Nicknamed Pacharaca, Bonilla made his debut with Marathón in the 1972–73 season. He played his entire career at the club, retiring in 1985. In total, Bonilla played 271 matches and scored 57 goals. He has the record of match appearances in the club.

== International career ==
Arturo Bonilla was part of the Honduras national football team in the qualification of 1974 FIFA World Cup.

== Retirement ==
In 1985, Bonilla retired from soccer.
