= 2025–26 Honduran Liga Nacional =

Football league season in Honduras

Liga Nacional de Fútbol Profesional de Honduras
- Season: 2025–26
- Dates: 22 July 2025 – 25 May 2026
- Champions: Olimpia (Apertura); Marathón (Clausura)
- Relegated: Victoria
- 2026 CONCACAF Central American Cup: Olimpia; Marathón
- Matches: 110
- Goals: 345 (3.14 per match)
- Top goalscorer: Erick Puerto (16 goals)

The 2025–26 Honduran Liga Nacional season is the 60th edition of the Liga Nacional de Fútbol Profesional de Honduras since its establishment in 1965. The season is split into two separate tournaments: the Apertura, which took place from July 2025 to January 2026, and the Clausura, which commenced on 24 January 2026.

Olimpia entered the season as the defending champions and successfully secured the Apertura 2025 title on 7 January 2026, defeating Marathón with a 3–2 aggregate score in the final (2–2 in the first leg, 1–0 in the second leg). This marked Olimpia's 40th league title, tying Deportivo Saprissa of Costa Rica for the most domestic league championships in Central America.

By winning the Apertura, Olimpia became the first Honduran club to qualify for the 2026 CONCACAF Central American Cup, as confirmed by Concacaf. The remaining two berths for the international competition, as well as the team to be relegated to the Liga de Ascenso, will be determined by the results of the Clausura tournament and the final aggregate table.

== Teams ==
Location of teams in 2024–25 season

A total of 10 teams will contest the tournament, nine teams that participated in the 2025–26 season, and Atlético Choloma went up to the first division.

Team	Location	Stadium	Capacity
Polícia Nacional	Comayagua	Estadio Carlos Miranda	10,000
Juticalpa	Juticalpa	Estadio Juan Ramón Brevé Vargas	20,000
Marathón	San Pedro Sula	Estadio Yankel Rosenthal	15,000
Motagua	Tegucigalpa	Estadio Tiburcio Carías Andino	35,000
Olancho	Juticalpa	Estadio Juan Ramón Brevé Vargas	20,000
Olimpia	Tegucigalpa	Estadio Tiburcio Carías Andino	35,000
C.D. Victoria	La Ceiba	Estadio Nilmo Edwards	18,000
Real España	San Pedro Sula	Estadio Francisco Morazán	26,781
Atlético Choloma	Choloma	Estadio Rubén Deras	5,500
UPNFM	Choluteca	Estadio Emilio Williams Agasse	8,000

== Apertura ==
The Apertura tournament was the first phase of the 2025–26 season, which ran from 22 July 2025 to 7 January 2026. C.D. Olimpia claimed the title after defeating C.D. Marathón in the final series.

=== Standings ===
Pos	Team	Pld	W	D	L	GF	GA	GD	Pts	Qualification or relegation
1	Olimpia (C)	20	13	5	2	45	27	+18	44	Advance to Final Series (Semifinals)
2	Marathón	20	12	6	2	41	15	+26	42	Advance to Final Series (Semifinals)
3	Motagua	20	10	5	5	39	32	+7	35	Advance to Final Series (Play-offs)
4	Platense	20	8	5	7	34	20	+14	29	Advance to Final Series (Play-offs)
5	Real España	20	8	5	7	29	22	+7	29	Advance to Final Series (Play-offs)
6	Olancho	20	6	9	5	38	30	+8	27	Advance to Final Series (Play-offs)
7	UPNFM	20	6	8	6	24	30	−6	26	
8	Juticalpa (Note: Juticalpa were deducted 4 points by the Disciplinary Commission.)	20	6	7	7	28	42	−14	21	
9	Génesis	20	4	6	10	29	35	−6	18	
10	Victoria	20	4	2	14	23	42	−19	14	
11	Atlético Choloma	20	3	2	15	22	57	−35	11	

Source: El Heraldo
Rules for classification: 1) points; 2) goal difference; 3) number of goals scored.
(C) Champions

=== Triangular Phase ===
==== Triangular A ====
Pos	Team	Pld	W	D	L	GF	GA	GD	Pts	Qualification or relegation
1	Olimpia	4	3	1	0	5	1	+4	10	Advance to Grand Final
2	Real España	4	1	1	2	4	3	+1	4	
3	Motagua	4	0	2	2	2	7	−5	2	

Source: La Prensa
Rules for classification: 1) points; 2) goal difference; 3) number of goals scored; 4) head-to-head points; 5) head-to-head goal difference; 6) Fair Play points; 7) draw.

==== Triangular B ====
Pos	Team	Pld	W	D	L	GF	GA	GD	Pts	Qualification or relegation
1	Marathón	4	3	1	0	10	3	+7	10	Advance to Grand Final
2	Olancho	4	1	1	2	5	7	−2	4	
3	Platense	4	0	2	2	4	9	−5	2	

Source: La Prensa
Rules for classification: 1) points; 2) goal difference; 3) number of goals scored; 4) head-to-head points; 5) head-to-head goal difference; 6) Fair Play points; 7) draw.

=== Final ===
The first leg was held in Tegucigalpa on 4 January 2026, and the second leg in San Pedro Sula on 7 January 2026.

Team 1	Agg.	Team 2	1st leg	2nd leg
Marathón	1–3	Olimpia	1–2	0–1

4 January 2026
19:00 CST

Olimpia	2–1	Marathón
Bengtson 44'; Chirinos 78'		Vega 12' (pen.)

Estadio Nacional Chelato Uclés, Tegucigalpa
Attendance: 25,400
Referee: Nelson Salgado
7 January 2026
15:00 CST

Marathón	0–1	Olimpia
		Álvarez 65'

Estadio Yankel Rosenthal, San Pedro Sula
Attendance: 8,500
Referee: Said Martínez

Olimpia won the Apertura title with a 3–1 aggregate score.

== Clausura ==
The Clausura tournament is the second half of the 2025–26 season, which commenced on 24 January 2026. The tournament follows the same format as the Apertura, with the top six teams advancing to the final series.

=== Standings ===
Pos	Team	Pld	W	D	L	GF	GA	GD	Pts	Qualification or relegation
1	Real España	20	11	7	2	37	25	+12	40	Advance to Final Series (Semifinals)
2	Motagua	20	11	6	3	36	17	+19	39	Advance to Final Series (Semifinals)
3	Olimpia	20	11	5	4	35	17	+18	38	Advance to Final Series (Play-offs)
4	Olancho	20	8	8	4	28	16	+12	32	Advance to Final Series (Play-offs)
5	Marathón	20	7	6	7	23	19	+4	27	Advance to Final Series (Play-offs)
6	Génesis	20	6	5	9	20	28	−8	23	Advance to Final Series (Play-offs)
7	Atlético Choloma	20	6	5	9	23	32	−9	23	
8	Platense	20	5	6	9	26	29	−3	21	
9	UPNFM	20	5	6	9	23	30	−7	21	
10	Juticalpa	20	4	6	10	18	41	−23	18	
11	Victoria	20	4	4	12	25	40	−15	16	

Source: Diario Diez
Rules for classification: 1) points; 2) goal difference; 3) number of goals scored; 4) head-to-head points; 5) head-to-head goal difference.

=== Triangular fase ===
==== Triangular A ====
Pos	Team	Pld	W	D	L	GF	GA	GD	Pts	Qualification or relegation
1	Marathón	4	2	1	1	3	3	0	7	Advance to Grand Final
2	Olimpia	4	2	0	2	6	6	0	6	
3	Real España	4	1	1	2	6	6	0	4	

Source: La Prensa
Rules for classification: 1) points; 2) goal difference; 3) number of goals scored; 4) head-to-head points; 5) head-to-head goal difference; 6) Fair Play points; 7) draw.

=== Triangular B ===
Pos	Team	Pld	W	D	L	GF	GA	GD	Pts	Qualification or relegation
1	Motagua	4	2	1	1	6	4	+2	7	Advance to Grand Final
2	Génesis	4	1	2	1	6	5	+1	5	
3	Olancho	4	1	1	2	4	7	−3	4	

Source: La Prensa
Rules for classification: 1) points; 2) goal difference; 3) number of goals scored; 4) head-to-head points; 5) head-to-head goal difference; 6) Fair Play points; 7) draw.

=== Final ===
The winners of Triangular A and Triangular B, Marathón and Motagua respectively, faced each other in the Grand Final to determine the champion of the Clausura 2026 tournament. Motagua won the series after a penalty shootout and secured the championship.

Qualified teams
Team	Method of qualification	Appearance	Previous best
Marathón	Winner of Triangular A	4th	Winners (2002, 2007, 2018)
Motagua	Winner of Triangular B	9th	Winners (1997, 1999, 2000, 2001, 2002, 2015, 2017, 2018)

==== First leg ====
21 May 2026
20:00

Marathón	1–1	Motagua
Brian Farioli 90+4'	Report	John Kleber 77' (pen.)

Estadio Francisco Morazán, San Pedro Sula, Honduras
Referee: Nelson Salgado

==== Second leg ====
24 May 2026
17:00

Motagua	0–0 (a.e.t.)	Marathón
Penalties
Rodrigo Gómez (penalty scored); John Kleber (penalty scored); Andy Hernández (penalty scored); Clever Portillo (penalty scored)	4–2	Rubilio Castillo (penalty missed); Tomás Sorto (penalty scored); Odín Ramos (penalty missed); Isaac Castillo (penalty scored)

Chelato Uclés National Stadium, Tegucigalpa, Honduras
Referee: Saíd Martínez

== Aggregate table ==
Relegation is determined by the aggregated table of both Apertura and Clausura tournaments. The team with the fewest points at the end of the 2025–26 season is relegated to the Liga de Ascenso.

Pos	Team	Pld	W	D	L	GF	GA	GD	Pts	Qualification or relegation
1	Olimpia (C)	40	24	10	6	80	44	+36	82	Qualification for 2026 CONCACAF Central American Cup
2	Motagua (C)	40	21	11	8	75	49	+26	74	Qualification for 2026 CONCACAF Central American Cup
3	Marathón	40	19	12	9	64	34	+30	69	Qualification for 2026 CONCACAF Central American Cup
4	Real España	40	19	12	9	66	47	+19	69	
5	Olancho	40	14	17	9	66	46	+20	59	
6	Platense	40	13	11	16	60	49	+11	50	
7	UPNFM	40	11	14	15	47	60	−13	47	
8	Génesis	40	10	11	19	49	63	−14	41	
9	Juticalpa (Note: Juticalpa were deducted 4 points by the Disciplinary Commission during the Apertura phase.)	40	10	13	17	46	83	−37	39	
10	Atlético Choloma	40	9	7	24	45	89	−44	34	
11	Victoria (R)	40	8	6	26	48	82	−34	30	Relegation to Liga de Ascenso

Source: Diario Diez
Rules for classification: 1) points; 2) goal difference; 3) number of goals scored.
(C) Champions; (R) Relegated
