= 1981 Guatemalan Liga Nacional =

Liga Nacional
- Season: 1981
- Champions: Comunicaciones (10th title)
- Relegated: Tipografía Nacional
- Champions' Cup: Comunicaciones; Xelajú
- Copa Fraternidad: Comunicaciones; Xelajú

The 1981 Guatemalan Liga Nacional was the 30th edition of the Guatemalan Liga Nacional. Comunicaciones F.C. won their 10th title after finishing first in the Final round.

== Standings ==
Pos	Team	Pld	W	D	L	GF	GA	GD	Pts	Qualification
1	Comunicaciones	22	14	5	3	51	18	+33	33	Qualified to the Final round
2	Cobán Imperial	22	11	6	5	36	23	+13	28	Qualified to the Final round
3	Xelajú	22	10	7	5	36	24	+12	27	Qualified to the Final round
4	Aurora	22	10	6	6	28	25	+3	26	Qualified to the Final round
5	Finanzas	22	9	7	6	25	23	+2	25	Qualified to the Final round
6	Galcasa	22	8	7	7	31	30	+1	23	Qualified to the Final round
7	Suchitepéquez	22	9	5	8	25	23	+2	23	Qualified to the Final round
8	Pensamiento	22	6	7	9	25	33	−8	19	Qualified to the Final round
9	Juventud Retalteca	22	6	6	10	22	27	−5	18	Relegation round
10	Antigua	22	5	6	11	23	30	−7	16	Relegation round
11	Municipal	22	4	7	11	15	30	−15	15	Relegation round
12	Tipografía Nacional	22	2	7	13	18	49	−31	11	Relegation round

== Championship Round ==
Also known as the Octogonal

Pos	Team	Pld	W	D	L	GF	GA	GD	Pts	Qualification
1	Comunicaciones	14	9	4	1	22	9	+13	22	Champions
2	Xelajú	14	5	6	3	21	15	+6	16	
3	Cobán Imperial	14	4	6	4	18	19	−1	14	
4	Pensamiento	14	5	4	5	15	16	−1	14	
5	Aurora	14	4	5	5	14	16	−2	13	
6	Finanzas	14	3	6	5	17	19	−2	12	
7	Galcasa	14	4	4	6	20	25	−5	12	
8	Suchitepéquez	14	2	5	7	12	20	−8	9	

- Comunicaciones F.C. and Club Xelajú MC qualified to the 1982 CONCACAF Champions' Cup and the 1982 Copa Fraternidad.

== Relegation Round ==
Pos	Team	Pld	W	D	L	GF	GA	GD	Pts	Relegation
9	Juventud Retalteca	6	5	0	1	13	5	+8	10	
10	Municipal	6	3	2	1	7	2	+5	8	
11	Antigua	6	2	2	2	7	4	+3	6	
12	Tipografía Nacional	6	0	0	6	3	19	−16	0	Relegated
