= UMECIT FC =

Panamanian football club

UMECIT
- Full name: UMECIT Fútbol Club
- Short name: UMECIT FC
- Founded: 2008; 18 years ago
- Ground: Campo Futuras Promesas, Panama City
- Capacity: 1,000
- Owner: Metropolitan University of Education, Science, and Technology
- President: Juan David Nieto
- Manager: Julio Infante
- League: Liga LPF
- 2026: 3rd of 12
- Website: www.umecitfc.com
Home colors

UMECIT Fútbol Club is a Panamanian football club that competes in the Liga LPF, the top flight of Panamanian professional football, since 2023. The club originated as the Metropolitan University of Education, Science, and Technology's (UMECIT) university football program. In 2020, the Panamanian Institute of Sports recognized UMECIT FC as a professional football club. After two seasons in the Liga Prom, UMECIT FC was promoted to the Liga LPF for the 2023 season.

== History ==
UMECIT FC was founded in 2008 by the Metropolitan University of Education, Science, and Technology (UMECIT). The club began as the university's association football program and competed in Panamanian university leagues. In 2014, UMECIT FC joined the San Miguelito District Under-23 League.

In 2020, the Panamanian Institute of Sports officially recognized UMECIT FC as a professional football club. The club debuted in the Liga Prom (Panama's second division) during the 2021 season and finished in first place in both the apertura and clausura, but it was eliminated in the conference semifinals both times. Construction on the club's venue, the Campo Futuras Promesas, began in June 2021. During the 2022 season, UMICET FC won both the apertura and clausura playoffs and was promoted to the Liga LPF (Panama's first division).

== Personnel ==
=== Current squad ===
As of August 2026.

Note: Flags indicate national team as defined under FIFA eligibility rules; some limited exceptions apply. Players may hold more than one non-FIFA nationality.

No.	Pos.	Nation	Player
1	GK	PAN	David Almengor
3	DF	PAN	Jesús Delgado
5	MF	PAN	Vladimir Edghill
6	MF	PAN	Jacinto Fuentes
7	MF	PAN	Hiberto Peralta
8	MF	PAN	Rolando Batista
9	MF	PAN	Javier Murillo
10	MF	NCA	Emmanuel Gómez
11	MF	PAN	Erick Rodríguez
14	DF	PAN	Rodolfo Ford
15	DF	PAN	Josafath Livingston
17	FW	PAN	Andrick Edwards

No.	Pos.	Nation	Player
19	FW	PAN	Alberto Saldaña
21	MF	COL	Óber Almanza
22	MF	COL	Andrés Palmezano
23	DF	PAN	Emmanuel Chanis
26	DF	PAN	Jesús Araya
27	DF	PAN	Alberto García
29	FW	PAN	Óscar Becerra
30	GK	PAN	Celino Hinojosa
33	GK	PAN	Ángel Cárdenas
62	DF	PAN	Michael Casazola
80	MF	ECU	Gerly Delgado

=== Administrative staff ===
As of August 2026.

Position	Name
President	(Panama) Juan David Nieto
Administrative director	(Panama) Diana Gutiérrez
Administrative assistant	(Panama) Thais Velásquez
Communications and press chief	(Panama) Isaac Castillero
Photographer	(Panama) Anibal Rodríguez
Cinematographer and editor	(Panama) Luis Obregon (Panama) Gustavo Vergara
Stadium commentator	(Panama) Oziel Torres
Field delegate	(Panama) Rogers Yela
Logistics coordinator	(Panama) Favio Vergara
Legal department and integrity official	(Panama) Francisco Castillo
Accounting department	(Panama) Nohelis Serrano
Accounting assistant	(Panama) Yanikel Saravia
Health department	(Panama) Lourdes Iribarren
Nutricionist	(Panama) Andrea Muñiz
Sporting psychologist	(Panama) José Vásquez
Chief of security	(Panama) Bernal Marino Zúñiga
Stadium operations	(Panama) Elauterio Zúñiga

== Team statistics ==
=== League results ===
The following table displays UMECIT FC's combined performance in each season's apertura and clausura.

Season		Level	Pos	Pld	W	D	L	GF	GA	GD	Pts	Postseason	Ref.
2021	Apertura	2nd	1st	16	8	2	6	21	18	+3	26	Conf. semifinals	
2021	Clausura	2nd	1st	16	9	4	3	28	17	+11	31	Conf. semifinals	
2022	Apertura	2nd	2nd	16	11	2	3	29	8	+21	35	Champions	
2022	Clausura	2nd		16								Champions	
2023	Apertura	1st	7th	16	5	6	5	14	14	0	21	Did not qualify	
2023	Clausura	1st	11th	16	3	2	11	18	25	–7	11	Did not qualify	
2024	Apertura	1st	8th	16	5	5	6	13	15	–2	20	Did not qualify	
2024	Clausura	1st	9th	16	5	4	7	12	13	–1	19	Did not qualify	
2025	Apertura	1st	9th	16	4	6	6	16	19	+3	18	Did not qualify	
2025	Clausura	1st	7th	16	6	5	5	16	18	–2	23	Did not qualify	
2026	Clausura	1st	3rd	16	6	7	3	28	20	+8	25	Semifinals	
2026–27	Apertura	1st											
2026–27	Clausura	1st											

=== International results ===
The following is a list of results for UMECIT FC in international competitions. UMECIT FC's scores are listed first.

Year	Tournament	Round	Opponent	Home	Away	Agg.
2026	CONCACAF Central American Cup	Group Stage	(Costa Rica) Saprissa	1–2		
2026	CONCACAF Central American Cup	Group Stage	(Honduras) Olimpia	1–2		
2026	CONCACAF Central American Cup	Group Stage	(Panama) Alianza		0–1	
2026	CONCACAF Central American Cup	Group Stage	(Guatemala) Mixco		1–4	

== Honors and titles ==
Liga Prom (2)

- 2022 Apertura, 2022 Clausura
