= 1982 Copa Fraternidad =

Tournament details
- Teams: 8 (from 3 associations)

Final positions
- Champions: (Honduras) Real España (1st title)
- Runners-up: (Guatemala) Xelajú

Tournament statistics
- Matches played: 14
- Goals scored: 27 (1.93 per match)

The Copa Fraternidad 1982 was the 12th Central American club championship played between 8 clubs.

== Teams ==
Only El Salvador, Guatemala and Honduras sent representatives.

Association	Team	Qualifying method	App.	Previous best
(El Salvador) El Salvador	FAS	1981 Champions	4th	3rd (1980)
(El Salvador) El Salvador	Independiente	1981 Runners-up	1st	—
Guatemala	Comunicaciones	1981 Champions	10th	Champions (1971)
Guatemala	Xelajú	1981 Runners-up	2nd	First Round (1981)
Honduras	Vida	1981–82 Champions	2nd	Second Round (1981)
Honduras	Atlético Morazán	1981–82 Runners-up	1st	—
Honduras	Marathón	Invitee	3rd	Final Round (1981)
Honduras	Real España	Invitee	3rd	Runners-up (1979)

== Quarterfinals ==
FAS (El Salvador)	0–0	(Honduras) Atlético Morazán
Nil		Nil

Vida (Honduras)	2–1	(El Salvador) Independiente
TBD; TBD		TBD

Xelajú (Guatemala)	2–0	(Honduras) Marathón
TBD; TBD		Nil

7 February 1982

Real España (Honduras)	1–2	(Guatemala) Comunicaciones
Júnior Costly		Jorge Fernández; Ramon Ramírez

Estadio Morazon, Honduras

Atlético Morazán (Honduras)	2–3	(El Salvador) FAS
TBD; TBD		TBD; TBD

Independiente (El Salvador)	0–1	(Honduras) Vida
Nil		TBD

Marathón (Honduras)	1–1	(Guatemala) Xelajú
TBD		TBD

10 February 1982

Comunicaciones (Guatemala)	0–2	(Honduras) Real España
Nil		Miguel Mathews

== Semifinals ==
3 March 1982

Real España (Honduras)	3–0	(El Salvador) FAS
Edy Contreras; Carlos Recinos ?' (o.g.)		Nil

Vida (Honduras)	0–0	(Guatemala) Xelajú
Nil		Nil

10 March 1982

FAS (El Salvador)	1–0	(Honduras) Real España
Miguel González		Nil

Xelajú (Guatemala)	2–0	(Honduras) Vida
TBD		Nil

== Final ==
28 April 1982

Real España (Honduras)	2–1	(Guatemala) Xelajú
Edy Contreras] Hernán Juviny		Quintanilla

5 May 1982

Xelajú (Guatemala)	0–0	(Honduras) Real España
Nil		Nil

== Champion ==
1982 Copa Fraternidad Champion

Real España
2nd title
