= Orlando Sinclair =

Costa Rican footballer (born 1998)

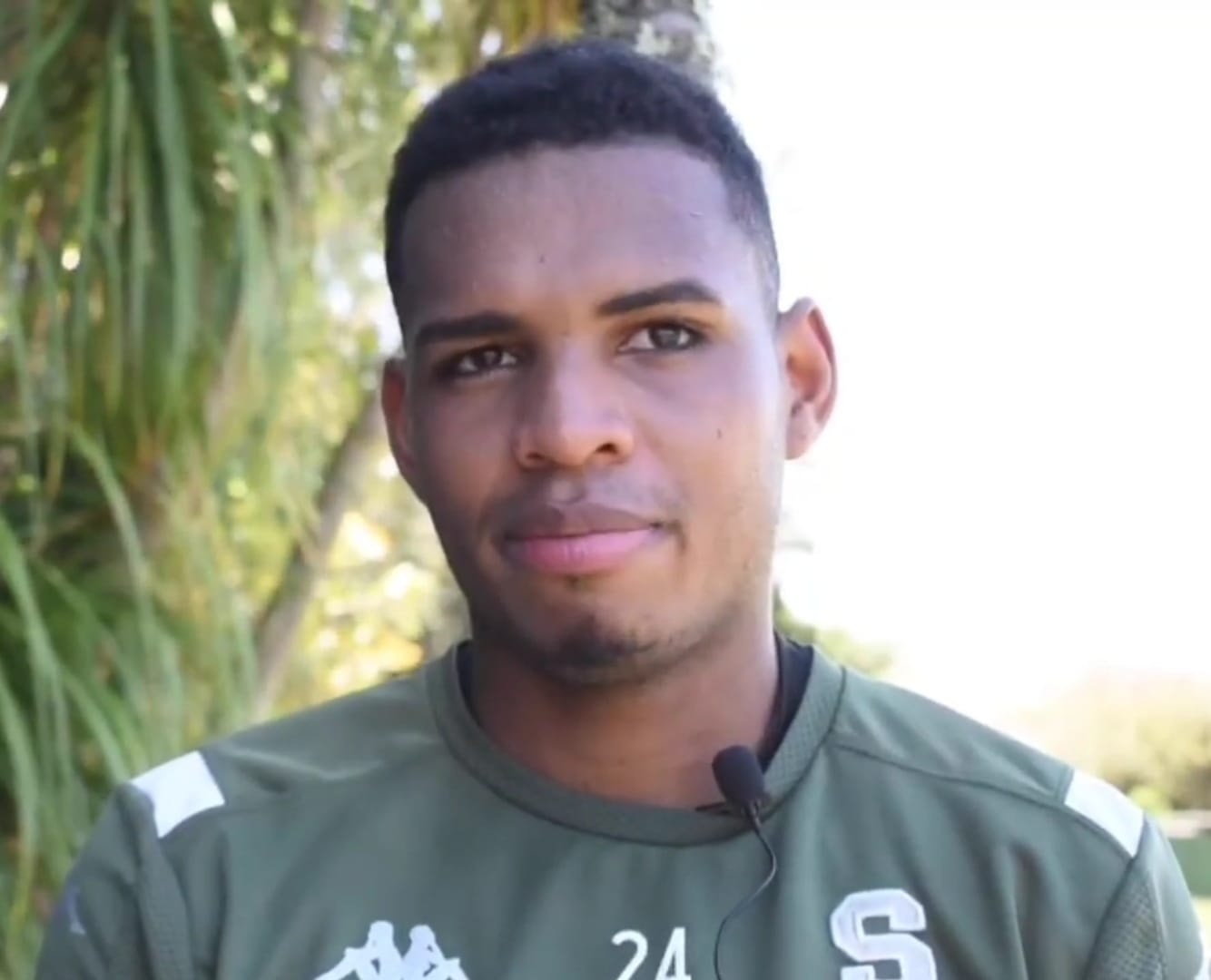
- 2021 by Diario Deportivo CR

Personal information
- Full name: Orlando Alexis "Singol" Sinclair Hernández
- Date of birth: April 19, 1998 (age 28)
- Place of birth: Uruca District, San José, Costa Rica
- Height: 1.87 m (6 ft 2 in)
- Position: Forward

Team information
- Current team: Saprissa
- Number: 24

Senior career*
Years	Team	Apps	(Gls)
2018–	Saprissa	208	(52)
2018	→ CS Uruguay de Coronado (loan)	15	(2)
2019	→ Loudoun United (loan)	24	(3)
2020	→ New England Revolution II (loan)	14	(2)

International career^{‡}
2025–	Costa Rica	8	(2)
- * Club domestic league appearances and goals as of 23:21, 19 September 2026 (UTC) ‡ National team caps and goals as of 23:01, 4 October 2026 (UTC)

Orlando Alexis Sinclair Hernández (born 19 April 1998) is a Costa Rican professional footballer who plays as a forward for Saprissa and the Costa Rica national team.

== Career ==
Sinclair signed with Loudoun United FC on March 1, 2019.

On January 16, 2020, Sinclair was announced as part of the inaugural roster for New England Revolution II of USL League One.

=== International ===
As of match played 4 October 2026

Appearances and goals by national team and year
National team	Year	Apps	Goals
Costa Rica	2021	1	0
Costa Rica	2025	1	0
Costa Rica	2026	6	2
Total		8	2

Scores and results list Costa Rica's goal tally first, score column indicates score after each Sinclair goal.

List of international goals scored by Orlando Sinclair
No.	Date	Venue	Opponent	Score	Result	Competition
1	24 September 2026	Ricardo Saprissa Aymá, San José, Costa Rica	Curaçao	1–0	3–4	2026–27 CONCACAF Nations League A
2	1 October 2026	Nicaragua National Football Stadium, Managua, Nicaragua	Nicaragua	1–0	3–0	2026–27 CONCACAF Nations League A

== Honours ==
=== Club ===
Saprissa

- Liga FPD: Clausura 2021
