= Gerson Torres =

Costa Rican football player (born 1997)

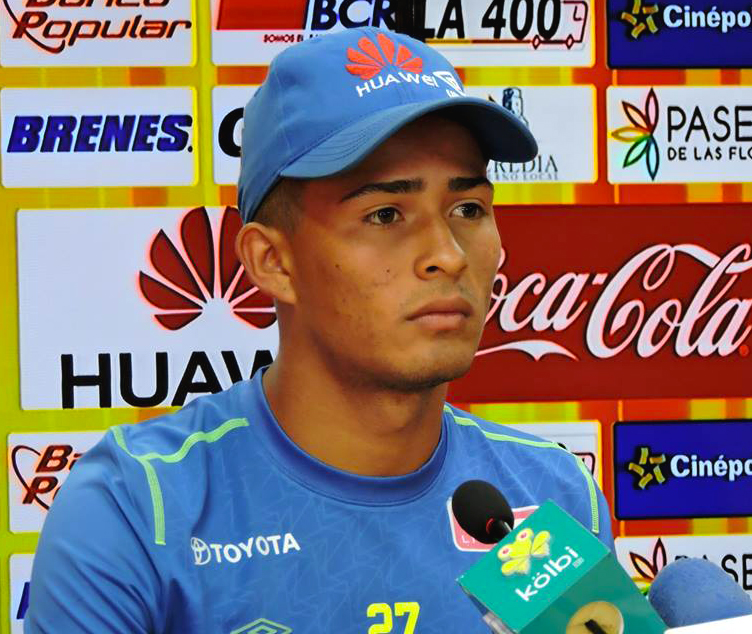
- Torres in 2017

Personal information
- Full name: Gerson Torres Barrantes
- Date of birth: 28 August 1997 (age 29)
- Place of birth: Heredia, Costa Rica
- Height: 1.76 m (5 ft 9 in)
- Position: Midfielder

Team information
- Current team: Deportivo Saprissa
- Number: 28

Senior career*
Years	Team	Apps	(Gls)
2015–2016	Belén	25	(2)
2016–2024	Herediano	275	(32)
2017	→ América (loan)	1	(0)
2018	→ Necaxa (loan)	3	(0)
2025–	Deportivo Saprissa	62	(7)

International career^{‡}
2016–2017	Costa Rica U20	8	(0)
2021	Costa Rica U23	3	(0)
2017–	Costa Rica	11	(1)
- * Club domestic league appearances and goals as of 19 September 2026 ‡ National team caps and goals as of 1 October 2026

Gerson Torres Barrantes (born 28 August 1997) is a Costa Rican professional footballer who plays as a right midfielder for Liga FPD club Deportivo Saprissa and the Costa Rica national team.

== Career ==
=== Club career ===
==== Youth career ====
Torres joined Belen's youth academy in 2012. He continued through Belén Youth Academy successfully going through U-17. Until finally reaching the first team, Gerardo Ureña being the coach promoting torres to first team when he was just 17 years of age.

==== Club America ====
Torres had slowly worked his way up from the U-20 team up to the first team where he made appearances in the Copa MX. Torres was set to make his Liga MX debut on 19 March 2017 against UNAM however due to league regulation America was notified that Torres was ineligible to play for the first team due to being registered as a foreigner on the U-20 team.

==== Necaxa ====
Following his year at America, Torres signed a 5-year extension with Herediano. Torres is set to be on loan for the 2018 year at Necaxa.

=== International career ===
He made his international debut on 15 January 2017, in a 3–0 friendly win over Belize. His first goal came as a stoppage-time header to defeat Honduras on 16 November 2021, as part of CONCACAF's third round of qualification for the 2022 FIFA World Cup. Such a goal was highly crucial for Costa Rica, as it represented a watershed moment between a very difficult first half of the Octagonal for Costa Rica and a near-perfect second half that saw the team reaching the intercontinental play-off.

=== International ===
As of match played 1 October 2026

Appearances and goals by national team and year
National team	Year	Apps	Goals
Costa Rica	2017	2	0
Costa Rica	2021	3	1
Costa Rica	2022	9	0
Costa Rica	2026	2	0
Total		16	1

Scores and results list Costa Rica' goal tally first.

No.	Date	Venue	Opponent	Score	Result	Competition
1.	16 November 2021	Estadio Nacional, San José, Costa Rica	Honduras	2–1	2–1	2022 FIFA World Cup qualification

== Honours ==
Herediano

- Liga FPD: Apertura 2018, Apertura 2019

Necaxa

- Copa MX: Clausura 2018
