= Nicolás Messiniti =

Argentine footballer

Personal information
- Full name: Nicolás Ariel Messiniti
- Date of birth: 21 February 1996 (age 30)
- Place of birth: Avellaneda, Argentina
- Height: 1.84 m (6 ft 1/2 in)
- Position: Forward

Team information
- Current team: C.D. Marathón

Youth career
- Independiente

Senior career*
Years	Team	Apps	(Gls)
2017–	Independiente	15	(1)
2017–2018	→ San Martín (loan)	4	(0)
2018–2019	→ Defensores (loan)	10	(2)
2019–2020	→ Temperley (loan)	14	(7)
2021	→ Once Caldas (loan)	9	(0)
2022–2023	→ Tristán Suárez (loan)	54	(10)
2024–2025	→ Delfín (loan)	17	(3)
2025	Al-Hamriyah		
2025–	C.D. Marathón	22	(17)
- * Club domestic league appearances and goals as of 19:32, 13 August 2023 (UTC)

Nicolás Ariel Messiniti (born 21 February 1996) is an Argentine professional footballer who plays as a forward for C.D. Marathón.

== Career ==
Messiniti's career began with Argentine Primera División side Independiente. In July 2017, Messiniti was loaned out to fellow Primera División team San Martín. His professional debut arrived on 28 October in a 1–0 home win against Estudiantes. A loan to Defensores de Belgrano of Primera B Nacional was confirmed on 22 August 2018.

== Career statistics ==
As of 6 September 2018.

Club statistics
Club	Season	League			Cup (Note: Includes the Copa Argentina)		League Cup		Continental (Note: Includes the Copa Libertadores and Copa Sudamericana)		Other		Total	
Club	Season	Division	Apps	Goals	Apps	Goals	Apps	Goals	Apps	Goals	Apps	Goals	Apps	Goals
Independiente	2017–18	Primera División	0	0	0	0	—		0	0	0	0	0	0
Independiente	2018–19	Primera División	0	0	0	0	—		0	0	0	0	0	0
Independiente	Total		0	0	0	0	—		0	0	0	0	0	0
San Martín (loan)	2017–18	Primera División	4	0	0	0	—		—		0	0	4	0
Defensores de Belgrano (loan)	2018–19	Primera B Nacional	0	0	0	0	—		—		0	0	0	0
Career total			4	0	0	0	—		0	0	0	0	4	0
