= Yairo Moreno =

Colombian footballer (born 1995)

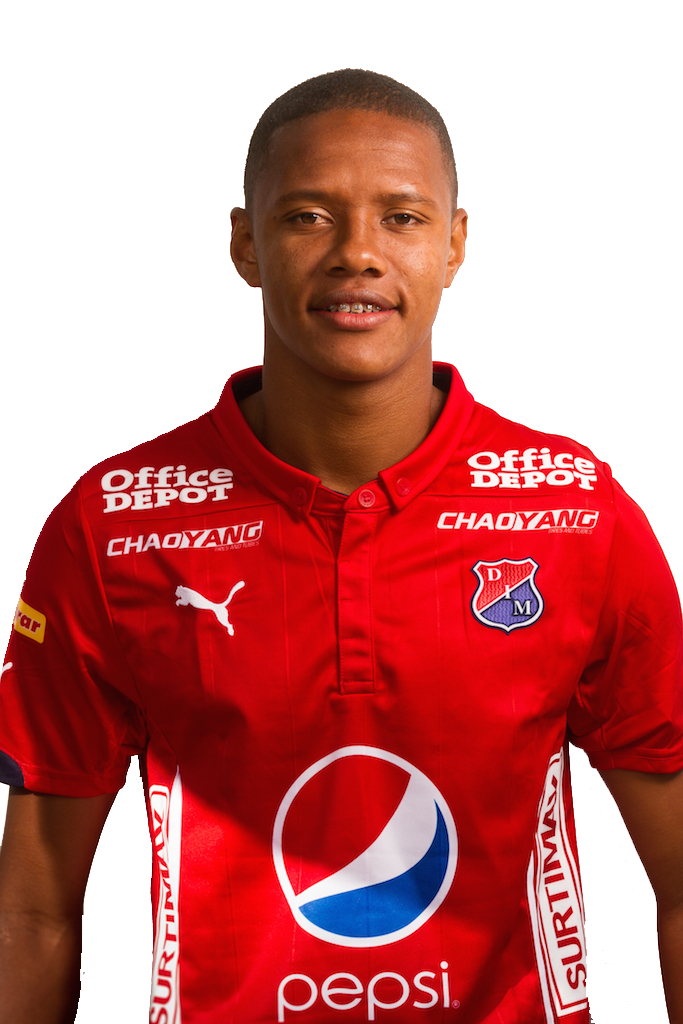
- Moreno with Independiente Medellín in 2018

Personal information
- Full name: Yairo Yesid Moreno Berrío
- Date of birth: 4 April 1995 (age 31)
- Place of birth: Necoclí, Colombia
- Height: 1.77 m (5 ft 9 1/2 in)
- Positions: Winger; left-back

Team information
- Current team: Marathón
- Number: 72

Senior career*
Years	Team	Apps	(Gls)
2014–2018	Independiente Medellín	40	(11)
2015	→ La Equidad (loan)	19	(0)
2016	→ Envigado (loan)	32	(7)
2018–2023	León	112	(10)
2021–2022	→ Pachuca (loan)	25	(3)
2023–2024	Independiente Medellín	21	(2)
2024	Atlético Junior	12	(0)
2025–2026	Santa Fe	11	(0)
2025–2026	Marathón	0	(0)

International career^{‡}
2019–	Colombia	16	(0)
Medal record
Representing Colombia
Men's football
Copa América
Third place	2021 Brazil
- * Club domestic league appearances and goals as of 11 December 2025 ‡ National team caps and goals as of 5 September 2023

Yairo Yesid Moreno Berrío (born 4 April 1995) is a Colombian professional footballer who plays as a winger or left-back for Liga Nacional club Marathón and the Colombia national team.

== Club career ==
=== Independiente Medellín ===
Born in Necoclí, Moreno moved to Medellín at early age and joined the youth sides of Independiente Medellín. He made his first team debut on 23 March 2014, coming on as a late substitute for Giovanni Hernández in a 2–0 Categoría Primera A home win over Deportivo Cali.

In the following two seasons, Moreno served loans at fellow top tier sides La Equidad and Envigado, scoring his first senior goal with the latter in a 2–1 loss to Patriotas. He returned to DIM for the 2017 campaign, and started to feature regularly for the club afterwards.

=== León ===
On 6 June 2018, Moreno moved abroad and signed for Liga MX side León. He made his debut abroad on 24 July, replacing Héctor Mascorro in a 4–3 Copa MX away loss to Mineros de Zacatecas.

Despite being a regular starter, Moreno was loaned to fellow league team Pachuca on 28 May 2021. An immediate starter, he lost his first-choice status during the 2022 Clausura tournament, and returned to León in June 2022.

On 11 July 2023, Moreno confirmed his departure from León through his Instagram profile.

=== Return to Independiente Medellín ===
On 4 September 2023, Moreno returned to Independiente Medellín on a contract until the end of the 2023 season.

== International career ==
Moreno made his senior national team debut on 6 September 2019 in a friendly against Brazil, when he replaced Juan Cuadrado in the 87th minute.

== Honours ==
León

- Liga MX: Guardianes 2020
- CONCACAF Champions League: 2023
