= 2025 CONCACAF Central American Cup group stage =

The 2025 CONCACAF Central American Cup group stage will be played from 29 July to 28 August 2025. A total of 20 teams competed in the group stage to decide the 8 places in the knockout stage of the 2025 CONCACAF Central American Cup.

== Draw ==
The draw for the group stage was held on 8 June 2023, 18:30 EDT (UTC−4), in Miami, Florida, United States. The 20 involved teams were previously seeded into five pots of four teams each based on their CONCACAF Club Ranking as of 2 June 2025.

Pot 1
Team	Rank
(Costa Rica) Herediano	40
(Costa Rica) Alajuelense	46
(Honduras) Olimpia	48
(Costa Rica) Saprissa	52

Pot 2
Team	Rank
(Guatemala) Antigua	54
(Honduras) Motagua	55
(Guatemala) Municipal	56
(Guatemala) Xelajú	60

Pot 3
Team	Rank
(Panama) Plaza Amador	61
(Costa Rica) Cartaginés	62
(Honduras) Real España	63
(Nicaragua) Real Estelí	66

Pot 4
Team	Rank
(Panama) Independiente	68
(Panama) Sporting San Miguelito	74
(El Salvador) Águila	83
(El Salvador) Alianza	88

Pot 5
Team	Rank
(Nicaragua) Diriangén	96
(Nicaragua) Managua	121
(El Salvador) Hércules	137
(Belize) Verdes	186

For the group stage, the 20 teams were drawn into four groups (Groups A–D) of five containing a team from each of the five pots. Teams from pot 1 were drawn first and were placed in the first position of their group, starting from Group A to Group D. The same procedure was followed for teams from pots 2, 3, 4 and 5, and they were placed in positions 2, 3, 4 and 5, respectively, within the group to which they were drawn. Each group must contain no more than two clubs from the same national association.

The draw resulted in the following groups:

Group A
Pos	Team
A1	(Costa Rica) Alajuelense
A2	(Guatemala) Antigua
A3	(Panama) Plaza Amador
A4	(El Salvador) Alianza
A5	(Nicaragua) Managua

Group B
Pos	Team
B1	(Costa Rica) Herediano
B2	(Guatemala) Municipal
B3	(Honduras) Real España
B4	(Panama) Sporting San Miguelito
B5	(Nicaragua) Diriangén

Group C
Pos	Team
C1	(Costa Rica) Saprissa
C2	(Honduras) Motagua
C3	(Costa Rica) Cartaginés
C4	(Panama) Independiente
C5	(Belize) Verdes

Group D
Pos	Team
D1	(Honduras) Olimpia
D2	(Guatemala) Xelajú
D3	(Nicaragua) Real Estelí
D4	(El Salvador) Águila
D5	(El Salvador) Hércules

== Format ==
In the group stage, each group is played on a single home-and-away round-robin basis, with teams playing against each other once, for a total of four matches per team (two home and two away). The teams are ranked according to the following criteria (Regulations Article 12.10.1):

1. Points (3 points for a win, 1 point for a draw, and 0 points for a loss);
2. Goal difference;
3. Goals scored;
4. If two or more teams are still tied after applying the above criteria, their rankings would be determined as follows:
  1. Head-to-head points in the matches played among the tied teams;
  2. Head-to-head goal difference in the matches played among the tied teams;
  3. Head-to-head goals scored in the matches played among the tied teams;
5. The lowest number of fairplay points, based on the following criteria:
  1. Yellow card: plus 1 point;
  2. Second yellow card/indirect red card: plus 3 points;
  3. direct red card: plus 4 points;;
  4. Yellow card and direct red card: plus 5 points;
6. CONCACAF Club Ranking after the group stage is completed.
7. Drawing of lots by CONCACAF.

The winners and runners-up of each group advanced to the quarter-finals of the knockout stage.

== Schedule ==
Matches in the competition will be played on either Tuesday, Wednesday, or Thursday as decided by CONCACAF. The schedule of each week is as follows (Regulations Article 2).

Weeks	Dates	Matches
Week 1	29–31 July 2025	Team 1 vs. Team 3, Team 5 vs. Team 2
Week 2	5–7 August 2025	Team 5 vs. Team 1, Team 2 vs. Team 4
Week 3	12–14 August 2025	Team 4 vs. Team 5, Team 2 vs. Team 3
Week 4	19–21 August 2025	Team 4 vs. Team 1, Team 3 vs. Team 5
Week 5	26–28 August 2025	Team 1 vs. Team 2, Team 3 vs. Team 4

== Groups ==
All match times are in EDT (UTC−4) and local times are in parentheses, as listed by CONCACAF.

=== Group A ===
Pos	Team	Pld	W	D	L	GF	GA	GD	Pts	Qualification	PLA	ALA	ANT	ALI	MAN
1	(Panama) Plaza Amador	4	4	0	0	11	6	+5	12	Advance to Quarter-finals	—	—	—	1–0	3–2
2	(Costa Rica) Alajuelense	4	3	0	1	5	3	+2	9	Advance to Quarter-finals	1–2	—	1–0	—	—
3	(Guatemala) Antigua	4	1	1	2	7	7	0	4		3–5	—	—	0–0	—
4	(El Salvador) Alianza	4	1	1	2	1	2	−1	4		—	0–1	—	—	1–0
5	(Nicaragua) Managua	4	0	0	4	4	10	−6	0		—	1–2	1–4	—	—

Source: CONCACAF
29 July 2025
22:00 (20:00 UTC−6)

Managua (Nicaragua)	1–4	(Guatemala) Antigua
Barrera 70'	Report	Espinoza 21'; Apaolaza 68', 90+4'; Maciel 86'

Estadio Nacional, Managua
Attendance: 980
Referee: Josué Ugalde (Costa Rica)
31 July 2025
22:00 (20:00 UTC−6)

Alajuelense (Costa Rica)	1–2	(Panama) Plaza Amador
Moya 39'	Report	Y. Murillo 73'; Rose 90+4'

Estadio Alejandro Morera Soto, Alajuela
Attendance: 4,501
Referee: Sergio Reyna (Guatemala)

5 August 2025
22:00 (20:00 UTC−6)

Antigua (Guatemala)	0–0	(El Salvador) Alianza
	Report

Estadio Pensativo, Antigua Guatemala
Attendance: 4,123
Referee: David Gómez (Costa Rica)
7 August 2025
22:00 (20:00 UTC−6)

Managua (Nicaragua)	1–2	(Costa Rica) Alajuelense
Hernández 58'	Report	Campos 45+2'; Mitchell 79'

Estadio Nacional, Managua
Attendance: 1,633
Referee: Victor Rivas (United States)

12 August 2025
22:00 (20:00 UTC−6)

Antigua (Guatemala)	3–5	(Panama) Plaza Amador
D. Santis 6'; Ó. Santis 61', 68'	Report	Sánchez 16', 44'; Rose 37'; Y. Murillo 47'; Quintero 58'

Estadio Pensativo, Antigua Guatemala
Attendance: 2,239
Referee: Shavin Greene (Guyana)
13 August 2025
22:00 (20:00 UTC−6)

Alianza (El Salvador)	1–0	(Nicaragua) Managua
Mauricio 54'	Report

Estadio Jorge "El Mágico" González, San Salvador
Attendance: 2,512
Referee: Nelson Salgado (Honduras)

19 August 2025
20:00 (19:00 UTC−5)

Plaza Amador (Panama)	3–2	(Nicaragua) Managua
Rose 22'; J. Murillo 33'; Sánchez 52'	Report	Verón 68', 81'

Estadio Rommel Fernández, Panama City (Note: Plaza Amador will play their home matches at Estadio Rommel Fernández, Panama City instead of their regular stadium COS Sports Plaza, Panama City which did not meet CONCACAF requirements.)
Attendance: 7,573
Referee: David Gómez (Costa Rica)
21 August 2025
20:00 (20:00 UTC−6)

Alianza (El Salvador)	0–1	(Costa Rica) Alajuelense
	Report	Piñar 45+1'

Estadio Cuscatlán, San Salvador
Attendance: 8,969
Referee: Jorge Ojeda (Nicaragua)

27 August 2025
20:00 (18:00 UTC−6)

Alajuelense (Costa Rica)	1–0	(Guatemala) Antigua
Hernández 83'	Report

Estadio Alejandro Morera Soto, Alajuela
Attendance: 4,580
Referee: Jesús López (Mexico)
27 August 2025
20:00 (19:00 UTC−5)

Plaza Amador (Panama)	1–0	(El Salvador) Alianza
Rose 40'	Report

Estadio Rommel Fernández, Panama City
Attendance: 6,921
Referee: Marianela Araya (Costa Rica)

=== Group B ===
Pos	Team	Pld	W	D	L	GF	GA	GD	Pts	Qualification	SSM	RES	MUN	DIR	HER
1	(Panama) Sporting San Miguelito	4	2	1	1	4	5	−1	7	Advance to Quarter-finals	—	—	—	2–1	2–0
2	(Honduras) Real España	4	2	0	2	8	6	+2	6	Advance to Quarter-finals	4–0	—	—	1–0	—
3	(Guatemala) Municipal	4	1	3	0	8	7	+1	6		1–1	2–1	—	—	—
4	(Nicaragua) Diriangén	4	1	1	2	5	5	0	4		—	—	1–1	—	4–2
5	(Costa Rica) Herediano	4	1	1	2	10	12	−2	4		—	4–2	4–4	—	—

Source: CONCACAF
30 July 2025
22:00 (20:00 UTC−6)

Herediano (Costa Rica)	4–2	(Honduras) Real España
Hernández 25'; Aguilar 34'; Decas 66' (o.g.); Montenegro 75'	Report	Gustavo 70', 90+2'

Estadio Nacional, San José (Note: Herediano will play their home matches at Estadio Nacional, San José instead of their regular stadium Estadio Eladio Rosabal Cordero, Heredia which is being rebuilt since 2020.)
Attendance: 2,545
Referee: Oliver Vergara (Panama)
31 July 2025
22:00 (20:00 UTC−6)

Diriangén (Nicaragua)	1–1	(Guatemala) Municipal
Arteaga 27'	Report	E. Hernández 90+7' (pen.)

Estadio Cacique Diriangén, Diriamba
Attendance: 3,126
Referee: Jaime Herrera (Mexico)

6 August 2025
20:00 (18:00 UTC−6)

Diriangén (Nicaragua)	4–2	(Costa Rica) Herediano
Arteaga 3'; Carballo 19', 31'; Cano 71'	Report	Hernández 11'; Montenegro 48'

Estadio Cacique Diriangén, Diriamba
Referee: Fernando Morón (Panama)
7 August 2025
22:00 (20:00 UTC−6)

Municipal (Guatemala)	1–1	(Panama) Sporting San Miguelito
Saravia 32'	Report	Ruiz 2'

Estadio El Trébol, Guatemala City
Attendance: 6,767
Referee: Ismael López (Mexico)

13 August 2025
20:00 (19:00 UTC−5)

Sporting San Miguelito (Panama)	2–1	(Nicaragua) Diriangén
Valencia 2' (pen.); De León 22'	Report	Arteaga 61'

Estadio Universitario, Penonomé (Note: Sporting San Miguelito will play their home matches at Estadio Universitario, Penonomé instead of their regular stadium Complejo Deportivo Los Andes 2, San Miguelito which did not meet CONCACAF requirements.)
Attendance: 615
Referee: Jon Freemon (United States)
13 August 2025
22:00 (20:00 UTC−6)

Municipal (Guatemala)	2–1	(Honduras) Real España
Morales 65'; Martínez 70'	Report	Aparicio 17'

Estadio El Trébol, Guatemala City
Attendance: 4,863
Referee: Katja Koroleva (United States)

20 August 2025
22:00 (20:00 UTC−5)

Real España (Honduras)	1–0	(Nicaragua) Diriangén
Moya 64'	Report

Estadio General Francisco Morazán, San Pedro Sula
Attendance: 2,021
Referee: Jose Torres (Puerto Rico)
21 August 2025
20:00 (19:00 UTC−5)

Sporting San Miguelito (Panama)	2–0	(Costa Rica) Herediano
Jaén 44'; Cox 64' (pen.)	Report

Estadio Universitario, Penonomé
Attendance: 1,535
Referee: Adonis Carrasco (Dominican Republic)

28 August 2025
22:00 (20:00 UTC−6)

Herediano (Costa Rica)	4–4	(Guatemala) Municipal
Aguilar 22'; Rubio 67' (pen.), 90'; Hernández 71'	Report	Barrientos 32'; Mena 69'; Pérez 74'; Altán 90+2'

Estadio Nacional, San José
Attendance: 3,818
Referee: Filip Dujic (United States)
28 August 2025
22:00 (20:00 UTC−6)

Real España (Honduras)	4–0	(Panama) Sporting San Miguelito
García 8'; Moya 29' (pen.); Cruz 32'; Gustavo 80'	Report

Estadio General Francisco Morazán, San Pedro Sula
Attendance: 3,040
Referee: Filiberto Martínez (El Salvador)

=== Group C ===
Pos	Team	Pld	W	D	L	GF	GA	GD	Pts	Qualification	MOT	CAR	SAP	CAI	VER
1	(Honduras) Motagua	4	2	2	0	6	2	+4	8	Advance to Quarter-finals	—	0–0	—	2–1	—
2	(Costa Rica) Cartaginés	4	2	1	1	12	3	+9	7	Advance to Quarter-finals	—	—	—	4–0	8–1
3	(Costa Rica) Saprissa	4	2	1	1	4	2	+2	7		0–0	2–0	—	—	—
4	(Panama) Independiente	4	2	0	2	5	7	−2	6		—	—	1–0	—	3–1
5	(Belize) Verdes	4	0	0	4	4	17	−13	0		1–4	—	1–2	—	—

Source: CONCACAF
29 July 2025
20:00 (18:00 UTC−6)

Verdes (Belize)	1–4	(Honduras) Motagua
Lopez 83'	Report	Mejía 16'; Serrano 21'; Santos 55'; Munguía 84'

FFB Stadium, Belmopan (Note: Verdes will play their home matches at FFB Stadium, Belmopan instead of their regular stadium Norman Broaster Stadium, San Ignacio which did not meet CONCACAF requirements.)
Attendance: 935
Referee: Waldir García (El Salvador)
29 July 2025
22:00 (20:00 UTC−6)

Saprissa (Costa Rica)	2–0	(Costa Rica) Cartaginés
Mora 3'; Williams 75'	Report

Estadio Ricardo Saprissa Aymá, San José
Attendance: 13,180
Referee: Ismael López (Mexico)

5 August 2025
20:00 (18:00 UTC−6)

Verdes (Belize)	1–2	(Costa Rica) Saprissa
Lozano 45+4'	Report	Vega 2'; Brenes 52'

FFB Stadium, Belmopan
Attendance: 350
Referee: Raúl Castro (Honduras)
5 August 2025
22:00 (20:00 UTC−6)

Motagua (Honduras)	2–1	(Panama) Independiente
Gómez 55' (pen.); Cabrera 57'	Report	Valverde 71'

Estadio Nacional Chelato Uclés, Tegucigalpa
Referee: Cristhofer Corado (Guatemala)

14 August 2025
20:00 (19:00 UTC−5)

Independiente (Panama)	3–1	(Belize) Verdes
Valverde 11'; Altamirano 41'; Águila 82'	Report	Vega 31'

Estadio Rommel Fernández, Panama City (Note: Independiente will play their home matches at Estadio Rommel Fernández, Panama City instead of their regular stadium Estadio Agustín Sánchez, La Chorrera which did not meet CONCACAF requirements.)
Attendance: 676
Referee: Karen Hernández (Mexico)
14 August 2025
22:00 (20:00 UTC−6)

Motagua (Honduras)	0–0	(Costa Rica) Cartaginés
	Report

Estadio Nacional Chelato Uclés, Tegucigalpa
Attendance: 2,497
Referee: Guido Gonzales Jr (United States)

20 August 2025
20:00 (19:00 UTC−5)

Independiente (Panama)	1–0	(Costa Rica) Saprissa
Caicedo 83'	Report

Estadio Rommel Fernández, Panama City
Referee: Rubiel Vazquez (United States)
20 August 2025
22:00 (20:00 UTC−6)

Cartaginés (Costa Rica)	8–1	(Belize) Verdes
Venegas 4', 28', 63' (pen.); Mesén 11', 16'; Ureña 29', 41', 45+1'	Report	Burgos 27'

Estadio José Rafael Fello Meza Ivankovich, Cartago
Attendance: 2,600
Referee: José Valladares (Honduras)

26 August 2025
22:00 (20:00 UTC−6)

Saprissa (Costa Rica)	0–0	(Honduras) Motagua
	Report

Estadio Ricardo Saprissa Aymá, San José
Attendance: 13,403
Referee: Daniel Quintero (Mexico)
26 August 2025
22:00 (20:00 UTC−6)

Cartaginés (Costa Rica)	4–0	(Panama) Independiente
Venegas 33' (pen.), 79'; Ureña 45+2'; López 90+4'	Report

Estadio José Rafael Fello Meza Ivankovich, Cartago
Attendance: 4,200
Referee: Kwinsi Williams (Trinidad and Tobago)

=== Group D ===
Pos	Team	Pld	W	D	L	GF	GA	GD	Pts	Qualification	OLI	XEL	EST	ÁGU	HER
1	(Honduras) Olimpia	4	3	1	0	11	3	+8	10	Advance to Quarter-finals	—	3–0	3–0	—	—
2	(Guatemala) Xelajú	4	3	0	1	9	4	+5	9	Advance to Quarter-finals	—	—	4–1	3–0	—
3	(Nicaragua) Real Estelí	4	2	0	2	6	7	−1	6		—	—	—	2–0	3–0
4	(El Salvador) Águila	4	1	1	2	4	7	−3	4		2–2	—	—	—	2–0
5	(El Salvador) Hércules	4	0	0	4	1	10	−9	0		1–3	0–2	—	—	—

Source: CONCACAF
30 July 2025
20:00 (18:00 UTC−6)

Hércules (El Salvador)	0–2	(Guatemala) Xelajú
	Report	Romário 48'; Báez 73'

Estadio Las Delicias, Santa Tecla
Attendance: 1,670
Referee: Jorge Leira (Panama)
30 July 2025
22:00 (20:00 UTC−6)

Olimpia (Honduras)	3–0	(Nicaragua) Real Estelí
Martínez 5'; Benguché 57'; Solano 90+9'	Report

Estadio Nacional Chelato Uclés, Tegucigalpa
Attendance: 7,942
Referee: Jon Freemon (United States)

6 August 2025
22:00 (20:00 UTC−6)

Hércules (El Salvador)	1–3	(Honduras) Olimpia
Posada 67' (pen.)	Report	Rodríguez 8'; Benguché 42'; Bengtson 75'

Estadio Las Delicias, Santa Tecla
Referee: Randy Encarnación (Dominican Republic)
6 August 2025
22:00 (20:00 UTC−6)

Xelajú (Guatemala)	3–0	(El Salvador) Águila
Aparicio 26'; López 48'; Báez 90+3'	Report

Estadio Cementos Progreso, Guatemala City (Note: Xelajú will play their home matches at Estadio Cementos Progreso, Guatemala City instead of their regular stadium Estadio Mario Camposeco, Quetzaltenango which did not meet CONCACAF requirements.)
Attendance: 2,748
Referee: Brayan Cruz (Costa Rica)

12 August 2025
22:00 (20:00 UTC−6)

Águila (El Salvador)	2–0	(El Salvador) Hércules
Caballero 7', 21'	Report

Estadio Cuscatlán, San Salvador (Note: Águila will play their home matches at Estadio Cuscatlán, San Salvador instead of their regular stadium Estadio Juan Francisco Barraza, San Miguel which is undergoing maintenance work.)
Attendance: 1,118
Referee: Fernando Morón (Panama)
14 August 2025
22:00 (20:00 UTC−6)

Xelajú (Guatemala)	4–1	(Nicaragua) Real Estelí
Díaz 6'; Casado 55' (o.g.); Báez 83'; Cardoza 90+1'	Report	Preciado 18'

Estadio Cementos Progreso, Guatemala City
Attendance: 2845
Referee: Waldir García (El Salvador)

19 August 2025
22:00 (20:00 UTC−6)

Águila (El Salvador)	2–2	(Honduras) Olimpia
Cerén 30'; Caballero 71'	Report	Bengtson 39'; Benguché 79'

Estadio Cuscatlán, San Salvador
Attendance: 4,195
Referee: Félix Mojica (Nicaragua)
21 August 2025
22:00 (20:00 UTC−6)

Real Estelí (Nicaragua)	3–0	(El Salvador) Hércules
Hernández 2'; Aranda 20'; Bonilla 49'	Report

Estadio Independencia, Estelí
Attendance: 1,870
Referee: Alyssa Nichols (United States)

27 August 2025
22:00 (20:00 UTC−6)

Olimpia (Honduras)	3–0	(Guatemala) Xelajú
Rivas 33'; Bengtson 35'; Benguché 37'	Report

Estadio Nacional Chelato Uclés, Tegucigalpa
Attendance: 7,964
Referee: Steven Madrigal (Costa Rica)
27 August 2025
22:00 (20:00 UTC−6)

Real Estelí (Nicaragua)	2–0	(El Salvador) Águila
Bonilla 25'; Talavera 58'	Report

Estadio Independencia, Estelí
Attendance: 4,580
Referee: Jefferson Escobar (Honduras)
