= 2025 CONCACAF Central American Cup knockout stage =

International football competition

The 2025 CONCACAF Central American Cup knockout stage is being played from 23 September to 3 December 2024. A total of 8 teams compete in the knockout stage to decide the champions of the 2025 CONCACAF Central American Cup.

== Qualified teams ==
The winners and runners-up of each of the four groups in the group stage advanced to the quarter-finals.

Group	Winners	Runners-up
A	(Panama) Plaza Amador	(Costa Rica) Alajuelense
B	(Panama) Sporting San Miguelito	(Honduras) Real España
C	(Honduras) Motagua	(Costa Rica) Cartaginés
D	(Honduras) Olimpia	(Guatemala) Xelajú

=== Seeding ===
Teams were seeded 1–8 based on results in the group stage and assigned a position in a fixed bracket. For each round, the host of the second leg was determined based on performance in all previous rounds, including the group stage.

== Format ==
The knockout stage is being played in a single-elimination tournament with the following rules:

- Each tie is played on a home-and-away two-legged basis. The home team of the second leg in each tie will be determined separately for each round as follows (Regulations Article 12.11):
  - In the quarter-finals, the group winners hosted the second leg.
  - In the semi-finals and play-in, the higher-ranked teams based on total points accumulated in the group stage and the quarterfinals will host the second leg.
  - In the finals, the higher-ranked team based on total points accumulated in the group stage, quarterfinals and semi-finals will host the second leg.
- In each round, if tied on aggregate, the away goals rule would be used. If still tied, 30 minutes of extra time would be played but the away goals scored during this time would not serve as a tie-breaking criteria. If still tied after extra time, the penalty shoot-out would be used to determine the winner (Regulations Article 12.10.2).

== Bracket ==
The bracket of the final stages was determined as follows:

Round	Matchups
Quarter-finals	(Group winner team host second leg): Match QF1: Team seeded 1 vs. Team seeded 8; Match QF2: Team seeded 4 vs. Team seeded 5; Match QF3: Team seeded 2 vs. Team seeded 7; Match QF4: Team seeded 3 vs. Team seeded 6
Play-in round	(Higher-ranked team in each tie host second leg): Match PI1: Loser QF1 vs. Loser QF2; Match PI2: Loser QF3 vs. Loser QF4
Semi-finals	(Higher-ranked team in each tie host second leg): Match SF1: Winner QF1 vs. Winner QF2; Match SF2: Winner QF3 vs. Winner QF4
Finals	(Higher-ranked team host second leg): Winner SF1 vs. Winner SF2

The bracket was decided based on the quarter-finals seeding.

Play-in
(Costa Rica) Cartaginés	1	3	4
(Honduras) Motagua	0	1	1
(Panama) Sporting San Miguelito	1	3	4
(Panama) Plaza Amador	0	2	2

Quarter-finals
7	(Costa Rica) Cartaginés	1	1	2
2	(Honduras) Olimpia	2	3	5
6	(Costa Rica) Alajuelense (a)	0	2	2
3	(Honduras) Motagua	1	1	2
5	(Guatemala) Xelajú (a.e.t.)	2	1	3
4	(Panama) Sporting San Miguelito	0	2	2
8	(Honduras) Real España (a)	0	2	2
1	(Panama) Plaza Amador	1	1	2

Semi-finals
(Costa Rica) Alajuelense	1	1	2 (3)
(Honduras) Olimpia	1	1	2 (0)
(Guatemala) Xelajú	1	1	2 (2)
(Honduras) Real España	1	1	2 (1)

Finals
(Costa Rica) Alajuelense	1	1	2 (4)
(Guatemala) Xelajú	1	1	2 (3)

== Quarter-finals ==
In the quarter-finals, the teams were seeded based on their results in the group stage, with the group winners seeded 1–4, and the group runners-up seeded 5–8. The group winners hosted the second leg.

Seed	Grp	Team	Pld	W	D	L	GF	GA	GD	Pts	Matchups
1	A	(Panama) Plaza Amador	4	4	0	0	11	6	+5	12	Match QF1
2	D	(Honduras) Olimpia	4	3	1	0	11	3	+8	10	Match QF3
3	C	(Honduras) Motagua	4	2	2	0	6	2	+4	8	Match QF4
4	B	(Panama) Sporting San Miguelito	4	2	1	1	4	5	−1	7	Match QF2
5	D	(Guatemala) Xelajú	4	3	0	1	9	4	+5	9	Match QF2
6	A	(Costa Rica) Alajuelense	4	3	0	1	5	3	+2	9	Match QF4
7	C	(Costa Rica) Cartaginés	4	2	1	1	12	3	+9	7	Match QF3
8	B	(Honduras) Real España	4	2	0	2	8	6	+2	6	Match QF1

Source: CONCACAF
Rules for classification: 1) Points; 2) Goal difference; 3) Goals scored; 4) Away goals scored; 5) Wins; 6) Away wins; 7) Disciplinary points (1 point for yellow card, 3 points for second yellow card/indirect red card, 4 points for direct red card, 5 points for yellow card and direct red card); 8) Drawing of lots (Regulations Article 12.11.4).

=== Summary ===
The first legs were played on 23–25 September, and the second legs were played between 30 September and 2 October 2025.

Team 1	Agg.	Team 2	1st leg	2nd leg
Real España (Honduras)	2–2 (a)	(Panama) Plaza Amador	0–1	2–1
Xelajú (Guatemala)	3–2 (a.e.t.)	(Panama) Sporting San Miguelito	2–0	1–2
Cartaginés (Costa Rica)	2–5	(Honduras) Olimpia	1–2	1–3
Alajuelense (Costa Rica)	2–2 (a)	(Honduras) Motagua	0–1	2–1

=== Matches ===
24 September 2025
22:00 (20:00 UTC−6)

Real España (Honduras)	0–1	(Panama) Plaza Amador
	Report	López 90'

Estadio General Francisco Morazán, San Pedro Sula
Attendance: 7,147
Referee: Steven Madrigal (Costa Rica)
1 October 2025
20:00 (19:00 UTC−5)

Plaza Amador (Panama)	1–2	(Honduras) Real España
Phillips 75'	Report	Benavídez 44' (pen.); Moya 90'

Estadio Rommel Fernández, Panama City (Note: Plaza Amador will play their home matches at Estadio Rommel Fernández, Panama City instead of their regular stadium COS Sports Plaza, Panama City which did not meet CONCACAF requirements.)
Attendance: 7,082
Referee: Cristhofer Corado (Guatemala)

Tied 2–2 on aggregate, Real España won on away goals, advanced to the semi-finals (Match SF1) and qualified for the 2026 CONCACAF Champions Cup Round One, at minimum. Plaza Amador advanced to the play-in.

24 September 2025
22:00 (20:00 UTC−6)

Xelajú (Guatemala)	2–0	(Panama) Sporting San Miguelito
Ruiz 65'; Quirós 79'	Report

Estadio Cementos Progreso, Guatemala City (Note: Xelajú will play their home matches at Estadio Cementos Progreso, Guatemala City instead of their regular stadium Estadio Mario Camposeco, Quetzaltenango which did not meet CONCACAF requirements.)
Attendance: 3,094
Referee: Waldir García (El Salvador)
2 October 2025
20:00 (19:00 UTC−5)

Sporting San Miguelito (Panama)	2–1 (a.e.t.)	(Guatemala) Xelajú
Valencia 4'; Jaén 88' (pen.)	Report	Romário 119'

Estadio Universitario, Penonomé (Note: Sporting San Miguelito will play their home matches at Estadio Universitario, Penonomé instead of their regular stadium Complejo Deportivo Los Andes 2, San Miguelito which did not meet CONCACAF requirements.)
Attendance: 2,158
Referee: Guido Gonzales Jr (United States)

Xelajú won 3–2 on aggregate, advanced to the semi-finals (Match SF1) and qualified for the 2026 CONCACAF Champions Cup Round One, at minimum. Sporting San Miguelito advanced to the play-in.

25 September 2025
22:00 (20:00 UTC−6)

Cartaginés (Costa Rica)	1–2	(Honduras) Olimpia
Ureña 69'	Report	Chirinos 9'; Benguché 38'

Estadio José Rafael Fello Meza Ivankovich, Cartago
Attendance: 4,600
Referee: Fernando Morón (Panama)
2 October 2025
22:15 (20:15 UTC−6)

Olimpia (Honduras)	3–1	(Costa Rica) Cartaginés
Benguché 6', 81'; Arboleda 71' (pen.)	Report	Quiroga 54'

Estadio Nacional Chelato Uclés, Tegucigalpa
Attendance: 16,289
Referee: Filip Dujic (Canada)

Olimpia won 5–2 on aggregate, advanced to the semi-finals (Match SF2) and qualified for the 2026 CONCACAF Champions Cup Round One, at minimum. Cartaginés advanced to the play-in.

23 September 2025
22:00 (20:00 UTC−6)

Alajuelense (Costa Rica)	0–1	(Honduras) Motagua
	Report	Vásquez 90+2'

Estadio Alejandro Morera Soto, Alajuela
Attendance: 6,154
Referee: Ismael López (Mexico)
30 September 2025
22:00 (20:00 UTC−6)

Motagua (Honduras)	1–2	(Costa Rica) Alajuelense
Gómez 24' (pen.)	Report	Campbell 30'; Campos 90+1'

Estadio Nacional Chelato Uclés, Tegucigalpa
Attendance: 15,709
Referee: Cristhofer Corado (Guatemala)

Tied 2–2 on aggregate, Alajuelense won on away goals, advanced to the semi-finals (Match SF2) and qualified for the 2026 CONCACAF Champions Cup Round One, at minimum. Motagua advanced to the play-in.

== Play-in ==
In the play-in, the teams in each tie which have the better performance across all previous rounds (group stage and quarter-finals) will host the second leg.

Pos	Team	Pld	W	D	L	GF	GA	GD	Pts	Host
1 (PI1)	(Panama) Plaza Amador	6	5	0	1	13	8	+5	15	Second leg
2 (PI1)	(Panama) Sporting San Miguelito	6	3	1	2	6	8	−2	10	First leg
1 (PI2)	(Honduras) Motagua	6	3	2	1	8	4	+4	11	Second leg
2 (PI2)	(Costa Rica) Cartaginés	6	2	1	3	14	8	+6	7	First leg

Source: CONCACAF
Rules for classification: 1) Points; 2) Goal difference; 3) Goals scored; 4) Away goals scored; 5) Wins; 6) Away wins; 7) Disciplinary points (1 point for yellow card, 3 points for second yellow card/indirect red card, 4 points for direct red card, 5 points for yellow card and direct red card); 8) Drawing of lots (Regulations Article 12.11.4).

=== Summary ===
Team 1	Agg.	Team 2	1st leg	2nd leg
Cartaginés (Costa Rica)	4–1	(Honduras) Motagua	1–0	3–1
Sporting San Miguelito (Panama)	4–2	(Panama) Plaza Amador	1–0	3–2

=== Matches ===
21 October 2025
(20:00 UTC−6)

Cartaginés (Costa Rica)	1–0	(Honduras) Motagua
Castro 90+2'	Report

Estadio José Rafael Fello Meza Ivankovich, Cartago
Attendance: 2,200
Referee: Jorge Leira (Panama)
28 October 2025
(20:00 UTC−6)

Motagua (Honduras)	1–3	(Costa Rica) Cartaginés
Portillo 71'	Report	Alfaro 56'; Ureña 73'; Quiroga 78'

Estadio Nacional Chelato Uclés, Tegucigalpa
Attendance: 5,846
Referee: Sergio Reyna (Guatemala)

Cartaginés won 4–1 on aggregate and qualified for the 2026 CONCACAF Champions Cup Round One.

22 October 2025
(19:00 UTC−5)

Sporting San Miguelito (Panama)	1–0	(Panama) Plaza Amador
Ruíz 66'	Report

Estadio Universitario, Penonomé
Referee: Josué Ugalde (Costa Rica)
29 October 2025
(18:45 UTC−5)

Plaza Amador (Panama)	2–3	(Panama) Sporting San Miguelito
Quintero 15'; Davis 38' (pen.)	Report	Ruíz 22'; Girón 86', 90+7'

Estadio Rommel Fernández, Panama City
Attendance: 1,256
Referee: Nelson Salgado (Honduras)

Sporting San Miguelito won 4–2 on aggregate and qualified for the 2026 CONCACAF Champions Cup Round One.

== Semi-finals ==
In the semi-finals, the team in each tie which has the better performance across all previous rounds (group stage and quarter-finals) will host the second leg.

Pos	Team	Pld	W	D	L	GF	GA	GD	Pts	Host
1 (SF1)	(Guatemala) Xelajú	6	4	0	2	12	6	+6	12	Second leg
2 (SF1)	(Honduras) Real España	6	3	0	3	10	8	+2	9	First leg
1 (SF2)	(Honduras) Olimpia	6	5	1	0	16	5	+11	16	Second leg
2 (SF2)	(Costa Rica) Alajuelense	6	4	0	2	7	5	+2	12	First leg

Source: CONCACAF
Rules for classification: 1) Points; 2) Goal difference; 3) Goals scored; 4) Away goals scored; 5) Wins; 6) Away wins; 7) Disciplinary points (1 point for yellow card, 3 points for second yellow card/indirect red card, 4 points for direct red card, 5 points for yellow card and direct red card); 8) Drawing of lots (Regulations Article 12.11.4).

=== Summary ===
Team 1	Agg.	Team 2	1st leg	2nd leg
Real España (Honduras)	2–2 (1–2 p)	(Guatemala) Xelajú	1–1	1–1
Alajuelense (Costa Rica)	2–2 (3–0 p)	(Honduras) Olimpia	1–1	1–1

=== Matches ===
22 October 2025
20:00 (20:00 UTC−6)

Real España (Honduras)	1–1	(Guatemala) Xelajú
Moya 69'	Report	López 63'

Estadio General Francisco Morazán, San Pedro Sula
Attendance: 11,469
Referee: Ismael Cornejo (El Salvador)
29 October 2025
20:00 (20:00 UTC−6)

Xelajú (Guatemala)	1–1	(Honduras) Real España
Cardona 90+7'	Report	Aparicio 51'
Penalties
Cárdena (penalty missed); Quezada (penalty missed); Aparicio (penalty missed); Reyes (penalty scored); Góndola (penalty scored)	2–1	(penalty missed) Romero; (penalty missed) Mejía; (penalty scored) García; (penalty missed) Decas; (penalty missed) Moya

Estadio Cementos Progreso, Guatemala City
Attendance: 12,642
Referee: Ekaterina Koroleva (United States)

Tied 2–2 on aggregate, Xelajú won on penalties and advanced to the finals.

23 October 2025
20:00 (20:00 UTC−6)

Alajuelense (Costa Rica)	1–1	(Honduras) Olimpia
Hernández 88'	Report	Montiel 74'

Estadio Alejandro Morera Soto, Alajuela
Attendance: 10,630
Referee: Jesús López Valle (Mexico)
30 October 2025
20:30 (20:00 UTC−6)

Olimpia (Honduras)	1–1	(Costa Rica) Alajuelense
Benguché 37'	Report	Hernández 71'
Penalties
Sánchez (penalty missed); López (penalty missed); Benguché (penalty missed)	0–3	(penalty scored) Gamboa; (penalty scored) Matarrita; (penalty scored) Villalobos

Estadio Nacional Chelato Uclés, Tegucigalpa
Referee: Pierre-Luc Lauzière (Canada)

Tied 2–2 on aggregate, Alajuelense won on penalties and advanced to the finals.

== Finals ==
In the finals, the team which has the better performances across all previous rounds (group stage, quarter-finals and semi-finals) will host the second leg.

Pos	Team	Pld	W	D	L	GF	GA	GD	Pts	Host
1	(Guatemala) Xelajú	8	4	2	2	14	8	+6	14	Second leg
2	(Costa Rica) Alajuelense	8	4	2	2	9	7	+2	14	First leg

First match(es) will be played: TBD. Source: CONCACAF
Rules for classification: 1) Points; 2) Goal difference; 3) Goals scored; 4) Away goals scored; 5) Wins; 6) Away wins; 7) Disciplinary points (1 point for yellow card, 3 points for second yellow card/indirect red card, 4 points for direct red card, 5 points for yellow card and direct red card); 8) Drawing of lots (Regulations Article 12.11.4).

=== Summary ===
The winner qualifies for the 2026 CONCACAF Champions Cup Round of 16.

Team 1	Agg.	Team 2	1st leg	2nd leg
Alajuelense (Costa Rica)	2–2 (4–3 p)	(Guatemala) Xelajú	1–1	1–1

=== Matches ===
26 November 2025
20:00 (21:00 UTC−6)

Alajuelense (Costa Rica)	1–1	(Guatemala) Xelajú
Cisneros 67'	Report	López 53' (pen.)

Estadio Alejandro Morera Soto, Alajuela
Referee: Fernando Hernández (Mexico)
3 December 2025
20:00 (21:00 UTC−6)

Xelajú (Guatemala)	1–1	(Costa Rica) Alajuelense
Cardona 82'	Report	Cisneros 74' (pen.)

Estadio Cementos Progreso, Guatemala City
Referee: Nelson Salgado (Honduras)
