= 2025 CONCACAF Central American Cup =

Association football tournament

Tournament details
- Dates: 29 July – 3 December
- Teams: 20 (from 7 associations)

Final positions
- Champions: (Costa Rica) Alajuelense (3rd title)
- Runners-up: (Guatemala) Xelajú

Tournament statistics
- Matches played: 58
- Goals scored: 170 (2.93 per match)
- Top scorer: (Honduras) Jorge Benguché (8 goals)
- Best player: (Costa Rica) Bayron Mora
- Best young player: (Costa Rica) Creichel Pérez
- Best goalkeeper: (Uruguay) Darío Silva
- Fair play award: (Guatemala) Xelajú

The 2025 CONCACAF Central American Cup is the third edition of the CONCACAF Central American Cup, the first-tier annual international club football competition in the Central American region, contested by clubs whose football associations are affiliated with the Central American Football Union (UNCAF), a sub-confederation of CONCACAF.

The winners of the 2025 CONCACAF Central American Cup will qualify directly for the 2026 CONCACAF Champions Cup Round of 16, while the second through sixth place teams will qualify to Round One.

== Teams ==
Twenty teams from the seven UNCAF member associations qualified for the tournament based on results from their domestic leagues. Eighteen slots were predetermined by CONCACAF while the remaining two slots were again granted to Costa Rica and Nicaragua as the national associations whose clubs were finalists in the previous edition of the tournament. The slot allocation for this edition was as follows:

- Costa Rica: 3+1 berths
- El Salvador, Guatemala, Honduras and Panama: 3 berths
- Nicaragua: 2+1 berths
- Belize: 1 berth

Association	Team	Qualifying method
Belize (1 berth)	Verdes	2024–25 Premier League tournament champions (2025 Closing) with better record in aggregate table.
Costa Rica (4 berths)	Herediano	2024–25 Liga FPD Apertura champions
Costa Rica (4 berths)	Alajuelense	2024–25 Liga FPD Clausura champions
Costa Rica (4 berths)	Saprissa	2024–25 Liga FPD aggregate table best team not yet qualified
Costa Rica (4 berths)	Cartaginés	2024–25 Liga FPD aggregate table second-best team not yet qualified
El Salvador (3 berths)	Hércules (Note: Originally, Once Deportivo was going to participate. However, the team disbanded due to purchase of the category and change of venue.)	2024–25 Primera División Apertura champions
El Salvador (3 berths)	Alianza	2024–25 Primera División Clausura champions
El Salvador (3 berths)	Águila	2024–25 Primera División aggregate table best team not yet qualified
Guatemala (3 berths)	Xelajú	2024–25 Liga Nacional Torneo Apertura champions
Guatemala (3 berths)	Antigua	2024–25 Liga Nacional Torneo Clausura champions
Guatemala (3 berths)	Municipal	2024–25 Liga Nacional aggregate table best team not yet qualified
Honduras (3 berths)	Motagua	2024–25 Honduran Liga Nacional Apertura champions
Honduras (3 berths)	Olimpia	2024–25 Honduran Liga Nacional Clausura champions
Honduras (3 berths)	Real España	2024–25 Honduran Liga Nacional aggregate table best team not yet qualified
Nicaragua (3 berths)	Diriangén	2024–25 Liga Primera Apertura champions
Nicaragua (3 berths)	Managua	2024–25 Liga Primera Clausura champions
Nicaragua (3 berths)	Real Estelí	2024–25 Liga Primera aggregate table best team not yet qualified
Panama (3 berths)	Independiente	2024 Liga Panameña Torneo Clausura champions
Panama (3 berths)	Plaza Amador	2025 Liga Panameña Torneo Apertura champions
Panama (3 berths)	Sporting San Miguelito	2024 Liga Panameña Torneo Clausura and 2025 Liga Panameña Torneo Apertura aggregate table best team not yet qualified

== Draw ==
The draw for the group stage was held on 8 June 2023, 18:30 EDT (UTC−4), in Miami, Florida, United States. The 20 involved teams were previously seeded into five pots of four teams each based on their CONCACAF Club Ranking as of 2 June 2025.

Pot 1
Team	Rank
(Costa Rica) Herediano	40
(Costa Rica) Alajuelense	46
(Honduras) Olimpia	48
(Costa Rica) Saprissa	52

Pot 2
Team	Rank
(Guatemala) Antigua	54
(Honduras) Motagua	55
(Guatemala) Municipal	56
(Guatemala) Xelajú	60

Pot 3
Team	Rank
(Panama) Plaza Amador	61
(Costa Rica) Cartaginés	62
(Honduras) Real España	63
(Nicaragua) Real Estelí	66

Pot 4
Team	Rank
(Panama) Independiente	68
(Panama) Sporting San Miguelito	74
(El Salvador) Águila	83
(El Salvador) Alianza	88

Pot 5
Team	Rank
(Nicaragua) Diriangén	96
(Nicaragua) Managua	121
(El Salvador) Hércules	137
(Belize) Verdes	186

For the group stage, the 20 teams were drawn into four groups (Groups A–D) of five containing a team from each of the five pots. Teams from pot 1 were drawn first and were placed in the first position of their group, starting from Group A to Group D. The same procedure was followed for teams from pots 2, 3, 4 and 5, and they were placed in positions 2, 3, 4 and 5, respectively, within the group to which they were drawn. Each group must contain no more than two clubs from the same national association.

== Schedule ==
The schedule of the competition is as follows.

Stage	Round	First leg	Second leg
Group Stage	Matchday 1	29–31 July	
Group Stage	Matchday 2	5–7 August	
Group Stage	Matchday 3	12–14 August	
Group Stage	Matchday 4	19–21 August	
Group Stage	Matchday 5	26–28 August	
Knockout	Quarterfinals	23–25 September	30 September – 2 October
Knockout	Semifinals and Play-in	21–23 October	28–30 October
Knockout	Finals	25–27 November	2–4 December

== Group stage ==
In the group stage, each group is played on a single home-and-away round-robin basis, with teams playing against each other once, for a total of four matches per team (two home and two away). The winners and runners-up of each group advanced to the quarter-finals of the knockout stage.

=== Group A ===
Pos	Team	Pld	W	D	L	GF	GA	GD	Pts	Qualification	PLA	ALA	ANT	ALI	MAN
1	(Panama) Plaza Amador	4	4	0	0	11	6	+5	12	Advance to Quarter-finals	—	—	—	1–0	3–2
2	(Costa Rica) Alajuelense	4	3	0	1	5	3	+2	9	Advance to Quarter-finals	1–2	—	1–0	—	—
3	(Guatemala) Antigua	4	1	1	2	7	7	0	4		3–5	—	—	0–0	—
4	(El Salvador) Alianza	4	1	1	2	1	2	−1	4		—	0–1	—	—	1–0
5	(Nicaragua) Managua	4	0	0	4	4	10	−6	0		—	1–2	1–4	—	—

Source: CONCACAF
Rules for classification: 1) Points; 2) Goal difference; 3) Goals scored; 4) Head-to-head results (points, goal difference, goals scored); 5) Fair play points; 6) Drawing of lots.

=== Group B ===
Pos	Team	Pld	W	D	L	GF	GA	GD	Pts	Qualification	SSM	RES	MUN	DIR	HER
1	(Panama) Sporting San Miguelito	4	2	1	1	4	5	−1	7	Advance to Quarter-finals	—	—	—	2–1	2–0
2	(Honduras) Real España	4	2	0	2	8	6	+2	6	Advance to Quarter-finals	4–0	—	—	1–0	—
3	(Guatemala) Municipal	4	1	3	0	8	7	+1	6		1–1	2–1	—	—	—
4	(Nicaragua) Diriangén	4	1	1	2	5	5	0	4		—	—	1–1	—	4–2
5	(Costa Rica) Herediano	4	1	1	2	10	12	−2	4		—	4–2	4–4	—	—

Source: CONCACAF
Rules for classification: 1) Points; 2) Goal difference; 3) Goals scored; 4) Head-to-head results (points, goal difference, goals scored); 5) Fair play points; 6) Drawing of lots.

=== Group C ===
Pos	Team	Pld	W	D	L	GF	GA	GD	Pts	Qualification	MOT	CAR	SAP	CAI	VER
1	(Honduras) Motagua	4	2	2	0	6	2	+4	8	Advance to Quarter-finals	—	0–0	—	2–1	—
2	(Costa Rica) Cartaginés	4	2	1	1	12	3	+9	7	Advance to Quarter-finals	—	—	—	4–0	8–1
3	(Costa Rica) Saprissa	4	2	1	1	4	2	+2	7		0–0	2–0	—	—	—
4	(Panama) Independiente	4	2	0	2	5	7	−2	6		—	—	1–0	—	3–1
5	(Belize) Verdes	4	0	0	4	4	17	−13	0		1–4	—	1–2	—	—

Source: CONCACAF
Rules for classification: 1) Points; 2) Goal difference; 3) Goals scored; 4) Head-to-head results (points, goal difference, goals scored); 5) Fair play points; 6) Drawing of lots.

=== Group D ===
Pos	Team	Pld	W	D	L	GF	GA	GD	Pts	Qualification	OLI	XEL	EST	ÁGU	HER
1	(Honduras) Olimpia	4	3	1	0	11	3	+8	10	Advance to Quarter-finals	—	3–0	3–0	—	—
2	(Guatemala) Xelajú	4	3	0	1	9	4	+5	9	Advance to Quarter-finals	—	—	4–1	3–0	—
3	(Nicaragua) Real Estelí	4	2	0	2	6	7	−1	6		—	—	—	2–0	3–0
4	(El Salvador) Águila	4	1	1	2	4	7	−3	4		2–2	—	—	—	2–0
5	(El Salvador) Hércules	4	0	0	4	1	10	−9	0		1–3	0–2	—	—	—

Source: CONCACAF
Rules for classification: 1) Points; 2) Goal difference; 3) Goals scored; 4) Head-to-head results (points, goal difference, goals scored); 5) Fair play points; 6) Drawing of lots.

== Knockout stage ==
The knockout stage is being played in a single-elimination tournament with the following rules:

- Each tie is played on a home-and-away two-legged basis. The home team of the second leg in each tie will be determined separately for each round as follows (Regulations Article 12.11):
  - In the quarter-finals, the group winners hosted the second leg.
  - In the semi-finals and play-in, the higher-ranked teams based on total points accumulated in the group stage and the quarterfinals will host the second leg.
  - In the finals, the higher-ranked team based on total points accumulated in the group stage, quarterfinals and semi-finals will host the second leg.
- In each round, if tied on aggregate, the away goals rule would be used. If still tied, 30 minutes of extra time would be played but the away goals scored during this time would not serve as a tie-breaking criteria. If still tied after extra time, the penalty shoot-out would be used to determine the winner (Regulations Article 12.10.2).

=== Qualified teams ===
Group	Winners	Runners-up
A	(Panama) Plaza Amador	(Costa Rica) Alajuelense
B	(Panama) Sporting San Miguelito	(Honduras) Real España
C	(Honduras) Motagua	(Costa Rica) Cartaginés
D	(Honduras) Olimpia	(Guatemala) Xelajú

=== Seeding ===
Teams were seeded 1–8 based on results in the group stage and assigned a position in a fixed bracket. For each round, the host of the second leg was determined based on performance in all previous rounds, including the group stage.

The following was the seeding for the quarter-finals round only:

Seed	Grp	Team	Pld	W	D	L	GF	GA	GD	Pts	Matchups
1	A	(Panama) Plaza Amador	4	4	0	0	11	6	+5	12	Match QF1
2	D	(Honduras) Olimpia	4	3	1	0	11	3	+8	10	Match QF3
3	C	(Honduras) Motagua	4	2	2	0	6	2	+4	8	Match QF4
4	B	(Panama) Sporting San Miguelito	4	2	1	1	4	5	−1	7	Match QF2
5	D	(Guatemala) Xelajú	4	3	0	1	9	4	+5	9	Match QF2
6	A	(Costa Rica) Alajuelense	4	3	0	1	5	3	+2	9	Match QF4
7	C	(Costa Rica) Cartaginés	4	2	1	1	12	3	+9	7	Match QF3
8	B	(Honduras) Real España	4	2	0	2	8	6	+2	6	Match QF1

Source: CONCACAF
Rules for classification: 1) Points; 2) Goal difference; 3) Goals scored; 4) Away goals scored; 5) Wins; 6) Away wins; 7) Disciplinary points (1 point for yellow card, 3 points for second yellow card/indirect red card, 4 points for direct red card, 5 points for yellow card and direct red card); 8) Drawing of lots (Regulations Article 12.11.4).

=== Bracket ===
The bracket was decided based on the quarter-finals seeding.

Play-in
(Costa Rica) Cartaginés	1	3	4
(Honduras) Motagua	0	1	1
(Panama) Sporting San Miguelito	1	3	4
(Panama) Plaza Amador	0	2	2

Quarter-finals
7	(Costa Rica) Cartaginés	1	1	2
2	(Honduras) Olimpia	2	3	5
6	(Costa Rica) Alajuelense (a)	0	2	2
3	(Honduras) Motagua	1	1	2
5	(Guatemala) Xelajú (a.e.t.)	2	1	3
4	(Panama) Sporting San Miguelito	0	2	2
8	(Honduras) Real España (a)	0	2	2
1	(Panama) Plaza Amador	1	1	2

Semi-finals
(Costa Rica) Alajuelense	1	1	2 (3)
(Honduras) Olimpia	1	1	2 (0)
(Guatemala) Xelajú	1	1	2 (2)
(Honduras) Real España	1	1	2 (1)

Finals
(Costa Rica) Alajuelense	1	1	2 (4)
(Guatemala) Xelajú	1	1	2 (3)

=== Quarter-finals ===
The first legs were played on 23–25 September, and the second legs were played between 30 September and 2 October 2025.

Team 1	Agg.	Team 2	1st leg	2nd leg
Real España (Honduras)	2–2 (a)	(Panama) Plaza Amador	0–1	2–1
Xelajú (Guatemala)	3–2 (a.e.t.)	(Panama) Sporting San Miguelito	2–0	1–2
Cartaginés (Costa Rica)	2–5	(Honduras) Olimpia	1–2	1–3
Alajuelense (Costa Rica)	2–2 (a)	(Honduras) Motagua	0–1	2–1

=== Play-in ===
Team 1	Agg.	Team 2	1st leg	2nd leg
Cartaginés (Costa Rica)	4–1	(Honduras) Motagua	1–0	3–1
Sporting San Miguelito (Panama)	4–2	(Panama) Plaza Amador	1–0	3–2

=== Semi-finals ===
Team 1	Agg.	Team 2	1st leg	2nd leg
Real España (Honduras)	2–2 (1–2 p)	(Guatemala) Xelajú	1–1	1–1
Alajuelense (Costa Rica)	2–2 (3–0 p)	(Honduras) Olimpia	1–1	1–1

=== Finals ===
Team 1	Agg.	Team 2	1st leg	2nd leg
Alajuelense (Costa Rica)	2–2 (4–3 p)	(Guatemala) Xelajú	1–1	1–1

== Top goalscorers ==
Team eliminated for this round.
Team inactive for this round.

As of 30 October 2025

Rank	Player	Team	GS1	GS2	GS3	GS4	GS5	QF1	QF2	PI1	PI2	SF1	SF2	F1	F2	Total
1	(Honduras) Jorge Benguché	(Honduras) Olimpia	1	1		1	1	1	2				1			8
2	(Costa Rica) Marco Ureña	(Costa Rica) Cartaginés				3	1	1			1					6
3	(Costa Rica) Johan Venegas	(Costa Rica) Cartaginés				3	2									5
4	(Honduras) Brayan Moya	(Honduras) Real España				1	1		1			1				4
4	(Panama) Everardo Rose	(Panama) Plaza Amador	1		1	1	1									4
6	(Nicaragua) Junior Arteaga	(Nicaragua) Diriangén	1	1	1											3
6	(Paraguay) Pedro Báez	(Guatemala) Xelajú	1	1	1											3
6	(Honduras) Jerry Bengtson	(Honduras) Olimpia		1		1	1									3
6	(Paraguay) Mauro Caballero	(El Salvador) Águila			2	1										3
6	(Costa Rica) Anthony Hernández	(Costa Rica) Alajuelense					1					1	1			3
6	(Cuba) Marcel Hernández	(Costa Rica) Herediano	1	1			1									3
6	(Panama) Martín Ruíz	(Panama) Sporting San Miguelito		1						1	1					3
6	(Panama) Jorlian Sánchez	(Panama) Plaza Amador			2	1										3
6	(Brazil) Gustavo Souza	(Honduras) Real España	2				1									3

== See also ==
- 2025 CONCACAF Caribbean Cup
- 2025 Leagues Cup
- 2026 CONCACAF Champions Cup
