= Rodas (surname) =

Rodas is a Spanish surname. Notable people with the surname include:

== Sports ==
- Anapaola Borda Rodas (born 2004), Argentine chess master
- Aslinn Rodas (born 1992), Guatemalan footballer
- Braian Angola-Rodas (born 1994), Colombian basketball player
- Carlos Rodas (born 1975), Colombian footballer
- Elsar Rodas (born 1994), Peruvian footballer
- Gerson Rodas (born 1990), Honduran footballer
- Gustavo Rodas (born 1986), Argentine footballer
- Héctor Rodas (born 1988), Spanish footballer
- Jorge Rodas (born 1971), Guatemalan footballer
- Julián Rodas (born 1982), Colombian bicycle racer
- Julio Rodas (born 1966), Guatemalan footballer
- Luis Rodas (born 1985), Honduran footballer
- Manolo Rodas (born 1996), German footballer
- Manuel Rodas (born 1984), Guatemalan cyclist
- Mariandre Rodas (born 1995), Guatemalan footballer
- Mateo Rodas (born 1998), Colombian footballer
- Rich Rodas (born 1959), American baseball player
- Rolando Patricio Vera Rodas (born 1965), Ecuadorian long-distance runner

== Politics ==
- Haroldo Rodas (1946–2020), Guatemalan politician
- Luis E. Arreaga-Rodas (born 1952), Guatemalan-American diplomat
- Mauricio Rodas (born 1975), Ecuadorian politician
- Modesto Rodas Alvarado (1921–1979), Honduran politician
- Patricia Rodas (born 1960), Honduran politician

== Other ==
- Ana María Rodas (born 1937), Guatemalan writer
- Arturo Rodas (born 1954), Ecuadorian composer
- Fabiola Rodas (born 1993), Guatemalan singer
- Gaspar de Rodas (1518–1607), Spanish explorer
- Juana Marta Rodas (1925–2013), Paraguayan ceramist
- Lorenzo de Rodas (1930–2011), Spanish actor and film director
- Modesto Delgado Rodas (1886–1963), Paraguayan painter
- Rodrigo Pesántez Rodas (1937–2020), Ecuadorian poet and writer
- Edgar Rodas Vega (born 1968), Paraguayan Attorney at Law

== See also ==
- Rodas, a Cuban town and municipality
