= Kevin Ruiz (footballer, born 1995) =

Guatemalan footballer (born 1995)

Personal information
- Date of birth: 18 February 1995 (age 31)
- Place of birth: Patulul, Guatemala
- Height: 1.83 m (6 ft 0 in)
- Position: Centre-back

Team information
- Current team: Xelajú
- Number: 25

Senior career*
| Years | Team | Apps | (Gls) |
| 2015–2017 | Suchitepéquez | 105 | (4) |
| 2017–2018 | C.S.D. Municipal | 28 | (0) |
| 2018 | Xelajú | 2 | (0) |
| 2019–2022 | Malacateco | 127 | (2) |
| 2022– | Xelajú | 139 | (11) |

International career^{‡}
| 2011 | Guatemala U17 | | |
| 2018– | Guatemala | 11 | (0) |
- * Club domestic league appearances and goals as of 27 July 2026 ‡ National team caps and goals as of 27 July 2026

Kevin Ruiz (born 18 February 1995) is a Guatemalan professional footballer who plays as a centre-back for Liga Bantrab club Xelajú and the Guatemala national football team.

== Club career ==
=== Xelajú ===
Ruiz played breifly for Xelajú in 2018, and has been a frequent feature for the team since his return in 2022. He has also played for Xelajú in the CONCACAF Central American Cup, where he won a player of the match award in the 2025 edition.

== International career ==
Ruiz has appeared 11 times for the Guatemala national football team.
