= Minor Álvarez =

Costa Rican footballer (born 1989)

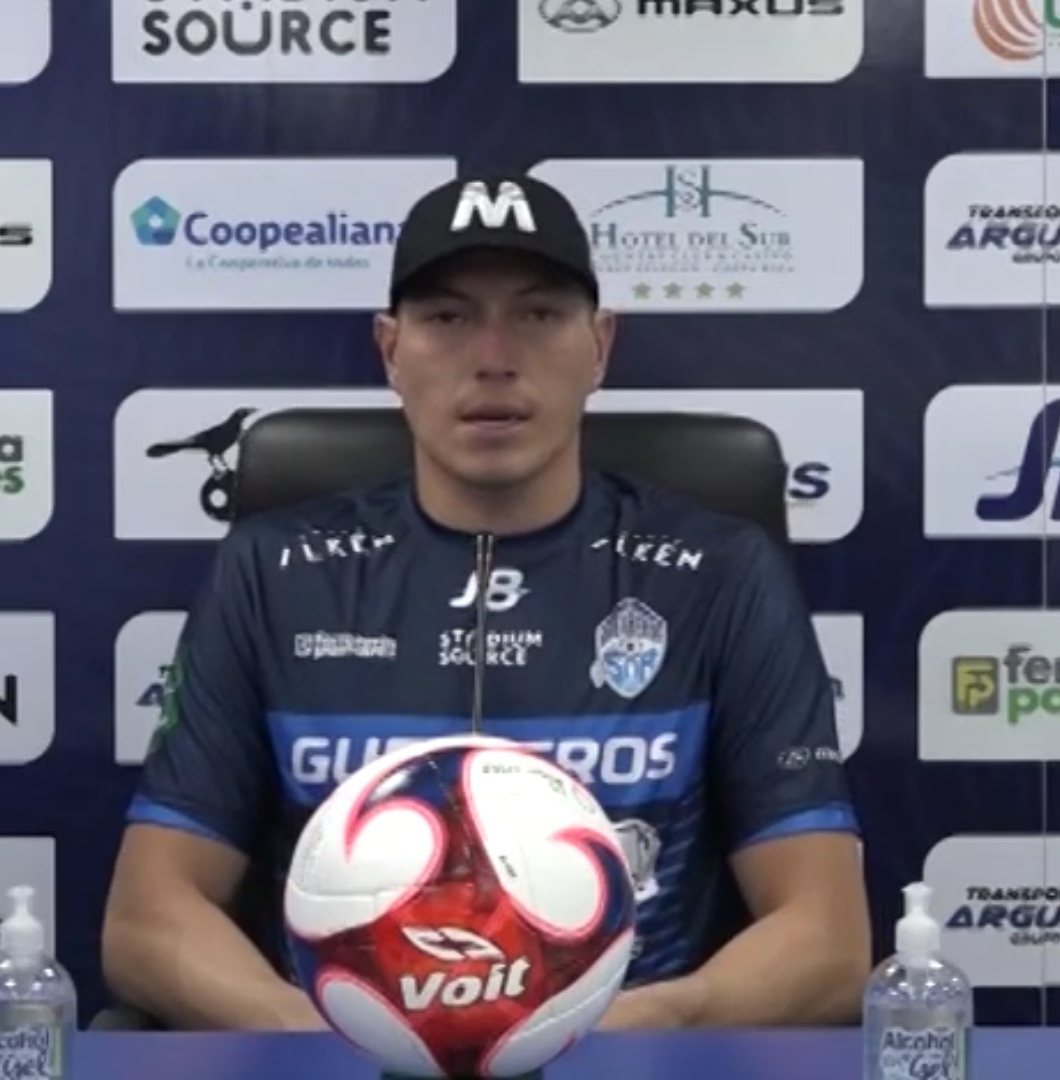
- Álvarez with Pérez Zeledón in 2021

Personal information
- Full name: Minor Jesús Álvarez Cordero
- Date of birth: 14 November 1989 (age 36)
- Place of birth: San José, Costa Rica
- Height: 1.90 m (6 ft 3 in)
- Position: Goalkeeper

Team information
- Current team: Cobán Imperial
- Number: 1

Youth career
- Saprissa

Senior career*
Years	Team	Apps	(Gls)
2010–2012	Saprissa		
2011	→ Belén (loan)		
2012	→ Santos (loan)		
2013	Xelajú	3	(0)
2013	→ Aurora (loan)		
2014	Malacateco	15	(0)
2014–2015	Antigua GFC	13	(0)
2015–2016	Petapa	13	(0)
2016	Cartaginés	8	(0)
2016	Municipal San Ramón		
2017	Pérez Zeledón	12	(0)
2017	UCR	5	(0)
2018–2019	Sporting San José		
2019–2020	Juventud Escazuceña		
2020	Limón	11	
2021–2022	Herediano	10	(0)
2021	→ Pérez Zeledón (loan)	7	(0)
2021-2022	→ Cobán Imperial (loan)	10	(0)
2022-	Cobán Imperial	17	(0)

International career^{‡}
2020–	Costa Rica	1	(0)
- * Club domestic league appearances and goals as of 18:33, 7 June 2021 (UTC) ‡ National team caps and goals as of 10 October 2020

Minor Jesús Álvarez Cordero, known as Minor Álvarez (born 14 November 1989) is a Costa Rican professional footballer who plays as a goalkeeper for Liga Nacional club Cobán Imperial.

== Club career ==
Álvarez played for Saprissa and had loan spells at Belén Siglo XXI and Santos de Guápiles. In January 2013, Álvarez moved abroad and signed a 5-year contract with Guatemalan side Xelajú but a surplus in foreigners forced him to be loaned out to Aurora. He received Guatemalan citizenship in September 2013 and joined Malacateco in January 2014.

== International career ==
He was included in the Costa Rica national football team for the 2011 Copa América, but did not play at all in the tournament.

He made his debut on 10 October 2020 in a friendly match against Panama.

== Honours ==
Cobán Imperial

- Liga Nacional de Guatemala: Apertura 2022
