= 2024–25 Honduran Liga Nacional =

Liga Nacional de Fútbol Profesional de Honduras
- Season: 2024–25
- Dates: 27 July 2024 –30 November 2024
- Champions: Apertura: Motagua
- Matches: 74
- Goals: 207 (2.8 per match)
- Top goalscorer: Rolando Blackburn (9 goals)
- All statistics correct as of 7 November 2024.

The 2024–25 Honduran Liga Nacional season is the 59th Liga Nacional de Fútbol Profesional de Honduras edition since its establishment in 1965. The tournament started on 3 August 2024 and is scheduled to end in May 2025. The season is divided into two halves (Apertura and Clausura), each crowning one champion. At the end of the season, the three teams with the best record qualified to the 2025 CONCACAF Central American Cup.

== Teams ==
Location of teams in 2024–25 season

A total of 10 teams will contest the tournament, nine teams that participated in the 2023–24 season, and Juticalpa went up to the first division.

Team	Location	Stadium	Capacity
Génesis	Comayagua	Estadio Carlos Miranda	10,000
Juticalpa	Juticalpa	Estadio Juan Ramón Brevé Vargas	20,000
Marathón	San Pedro Sula	Estadio Yankel Rosenthal	15,000
Motagua	Tegucigalpa	Estadio Tiburcio Carías Andino	35,000
Olancho	Juticalpa	Estadio Juan Ramón Brevé Vargas	20,000
Olimpia	Tegucigalpa	Estadio Tiburcio Carías Andino	35,000
C.D. Victoria	La Ceiba	Estadio Nilmo Edwards	18,000
Real España	San Pedro Sula	Estadio Francisco Morazán	26,781
Real Sociedad	Tocoa	Estadio Francisco Martínez Durón	3,000
UPNFM	Choluteca	Estadio Emilio Williams Agasse	8,000

== Apertura ==
The Apertura tournament is the first half of the 2024–25 season which ran from July to November 2024.

=== Standings ===
Pos	Team	Pld	W	D	L	GF	GA	GD	Pts	Qualification or relegation
1	Olimpia	18	11	5	2	38	15	+23	38	Advance to Final Series
2	Motagua (C)	18	10	4	4	37	21	+16	34	Advance to Final Series
3	Real España (O)	18	8	5	5	20	14	+6	29	Advance to Final Series Play-offs
4	Marathón	18	6	7	5	23	21	+2	25	Advance to Final Series Play-offs
5	Olancho (O)	18	6	6	6	26	20	+6	24	Advance to Final Series Play-offs
6	Génesis	18	5	6	7	23	28	−5	21	Advance to Final Series Play-offs
7	UPNFM	18	6	3	9	18	31	−13	21	
8	Victoria	18	5	5	8	30	32	−2	20	
9	Juticalpa	18	4	5	9	13	29	−16	17	
10	Real Sociedad	18	2	8	8	17	34	−17	14	

Source: LNPHN Soccerway
Rules for classification: 1) points; 2) goal difference; 3) number of goals scored.
(C) Champions; (O) Play-off winners

=== Results ===
Home \ Away	GÉN	JUT	MAR	MOT	OLA	OLI	RES	RSO	UPN	VIC
Génesis	—					0–3			3–0	
Juticalpa		—						1–1		
Marathón		4–1	—							2–2
Motagua				—				3–1	4–2	
Olancho		0–1			—		3–1			
Olimpia			2–2			—				
Real España				1–0			—			
Real Sociedad							0–3	—		
UPNFM					1–0				—	
Victoria	2–2					3–1				—

Updated to match(es) played on 12 August 2024. Source: Soccerway
Legend: Blue = home team win; Yellow = draw; Red = away team win.
For upcoming matches, an "a" indicates there is an article about the rivalry between the two participants.

== Apertura finals ==
| RD1 = Quarter-finals | RD2 = Semi-finals | RD3 = Finals

== Clausura ==
The Clausura tournament was the second half of the 2024–25 season. This tournament was marked by Jerry Bengtson breaking Wilmer Velasquez's 196 record for the league's all-time goal scorer on March 11, 2025, ending with 201 goals scored.

=== Regular season ===
==== Standings ====
Pos	Team	Pld	W	D	L	GF	GA	GD	Pts	Qualification or relegation
1	Olimpia (C)	18	10	5	3	29	13	+16	35	Advance to Final Series
2	Real España	18	10	5	3	27	15	+12	35	Advance to Final Series
3	Motagua	18	8	6	4	33	18	+15	30	Advance to Final Series Play-offs
4	Marathón	18	7	8	3	25	14	+11	29	Advance to Final Series Play-offs
5	Victoria	18	5	9	4	20	20	0	24	Advance to Final Series Play-offs
6	Génesis	18	4	10	4	22	23	−1	22	Advance to Final Series Play-offs
7	Olancho	18	5	6	7	20	24	−4	21	
8	UPNFM	18	3	7	8	18	31	−13	16	
9	Real Sociedad	18	1	9	8	11	26	−15	12	
10	Juticalpa	18	3	3	12	7	28	−21	12	

Source: Soccerway
Rules for classification: 1) points; 2) goal difference; 3) number of goals scored.
(C) Champions

==== Results ====
Home \ Away	GÉN	JUT	MAR	MOT	OLA	OLI	RES	RSO	UPN	VIC
Génesis	—									
Juticalpa		—								
Marathón			—							
Motagua				—						
Olancho					—					
Olimpia						—				
Real España							—			
Real Sociedad								—		
UPNFM									—	
Victoria										—

Updated to match(es) played on unknown. Source:
Legend: Blue = home team win; Yellow = draw; Red = away team win.
For upcoming matches, an "a" indicates there is an article about the rivalry between the two participants.

== Aggregate table ==
Relegation is determined by the aggregated table of both Apertura and Clausura tournaments.

Pos	Team	Pld	W	D	L	GF	GA	GD	Pts	Qualification or relegation
1	Olimpia (C)	36	21	10	5	67	28	+39	73	Qualified to 2025 CONCACAF Central American Cup
2	Motagua	36	18	10	8	70	39	+31	64	Qualified to 2025 CONCACAF Central American Cup
3	Real España	36	18	10	8	47	29	+18	64	Qualified to 2025 CONCACAF Central American Cup
4	Marathón	36	13	15	8	48	35	+13	54	
5	Olancho	36	11	12	13	46	44	+2	45	
6	Victoria	36	10	14	12	50	52	−2	44	
7	Génesis	36	9	16	11	45	51	−6	43	
8	UPNFM	36	9	10	17	36	62	−26	37	
9	Juticalpa	36	7	8	21	20	57	−37	29	
10	Real Sociedad (R)	36	3	17	16	28	60	−32	26	Relegated to 2025–26 Honduran Liga Nacional de Ascenso

Source: LNPHN Soccerway
Rules for classification: 1) points; 2) goal difference; 3) number of goals scored.
(C) Champions; (R) Relegated
