= Elmer Cardoza =

Guatemalan footballer (born 2002)

Personal information
- Full name: Elmer William Amado Cardoza Herrera
- Date of birth: 29 July 2002 (age 24)
- Place of birth: Joyabaj, Quiché Department, Guatemala
- Height: 1.78 m (5 ft 10 in)
- Position: Forward

Team information
- Current team: Xelajú

Youth career
- –2019: Xelajú

Senior career*
Years	Team	Apps	(Gls)
2019–	Xelajú	124	(11)
2024	→ Panargiakos (loan)	3	(0)

International career^{‡}
2019	Guatemala U17	3	(0)
2023	Guatemala U23	3	(0)
2022–	Guatemala	17	(0)
- * Club domestic league appearances and goals as of 8 March 2025 ‡ National team caps and goals as of 29 July 2026

Elmer Cardoza (born 29 July 2002) is a Guatemalan professional footballer who plays as a forward for Liga Nacional club Xelajú and the Guatemala national team.

== Club career ==
=== Xelajú ===
Elmer Cardoza has been with Xelajú since his youth career. He made his Liga Nacional professional senior debut on 23 October 2019, against Iztapa in a 3–1 defeat. On 27 May 2023, Cardoza would be a key player to Xelajú's Liga Nacional de Guatemala Clausura 2023 win after defeating Antigua, his first achievement with the club.

==== Loan to Panargiakos ====
In July 2024, Xelajú would loan Cardoza to Super League Greece 2 club Panargiakos. He would become the first player in the clubs history to join a European club. He was officially announced by the club on 22 August 2024. He would make three appearances before suffering an injury and eventually would leave and return to Xelajú ahead of the 2024-25 Liga Nacional Clausura.

== International career ==
=== Youth career ===
Elmer Cardoza would start his international career representing Guatemala at the 2019 CONCACAF U-17 Championship.

=== Senior career ===
Elmer Cardoza would debut for the senior team on 19 November 2022 in a friendly against Nicaragua, his side would win 3–1.

== Career statistics ==
=== Club ===
As of match played 6 October 2024

Appearances and goals by club, season and competition
Club	Season	League			Domestic Cup		Continental		Other		Total	
Club	Season	Division	Apps	Goals	Apps	Goals	Apps	Goals	Apps	Goals	Apps	Goals
Xelajú	2019-20	Liga Nacional	4	0	—		—		—		4	0
Xelajú	2020-21	Liga Nacional	5	0	—		—		—		5	0
Xelajú	2021-22	Liga Nacional	32	2	—		—		—		32	2
Xelajú	2022-23	Liga Nacional	43	4	—		—		—		43	4
Xelajú	2023-24	Liga Nacional	30	3	—		2 (Note: Appearance(s) in CONCACAF Central American Cup)	0	—		32	3
Xelajú	Total		114	9	0	0	2	0	0	0	116	9
Panargiakos (loan)	2024-25	Superleague 2	3	0	—		—		—		3	0
Total			117	9	0	0	2	0	0	0	119	9

=== International ===
As of match played 16 June 2025

Appearances and goals by national team and year
National team	Year	Apps	Goals
Guatemala	2022	1	0
Guatemala	2023	1	0
Guatemala	2024	11	0
Guatemala	2025	4	0
Total		17	0

== Honours ==
Xelajú

- Liga Nacional de Guatemala: Clausura 2023
