= Manolo Rodas =

German footballer

Personal information
- Full name: Pedro Manolo Rodas Steeg
- Date of birth: 4 July 1996 (age 30)
- Place of birth: Offenburg, Germany
- Height: 1.69 m (5 ft 7 in)
- Positions: Midfielder; winger

Team information
- Current team: FC St. Georgen
- Number: 11

Youth career
- –2005: VfR Elgersweier
- 2005–2007: FV Griesheim
- 2007–2009: Offenburger FV
- 2009–2015: SC Freiburg

Senior career*
Years	Team	Apps	(Gls)
2015–2018	SC Freiburg II	82	(13)
2018–2019	FSV Zwickau	2	(0)
2019–2020	Kickers Offenbach	12	(1)
2020–2021	Bahlinger SC	20	(0)
2022–2023	VfR Elgersweier	26	(6)
2023–	FC St. Georgen	11	(3)

International career
2010–2011	Germany U15	4	(1)
- * Club domestic league appearances and goals as of 20:55, 14 January 2024 (UTC)

Pedro Manolo Rodas Steeg (born 4 July 1996) is a German footballer who plays as a midfielder for FC St. Georgen.

== Personal life ==
Rodoas was born in the Elgersweier district of Offenburg, Baden-Württemberg to an Ecuadorian father.
