= Aslinn Rodas =

Guatemalan footballer

Personal information
- Full name: Aslinn Enei Rodas De León
- Date of birth: 10 June 1992 (age 34)
- Place of birth: San Rafael, California, United States
- Height: 1.78 m (5 ft 10 in)
- Position: Midfielder

Team information
- Current team: Xelajú
- Number: 12

Youth career
- 2008–2009: D.C. United
- 2010–2013: Cleveland State Vikings

Senior career*
Years	Team	Apps	(Gls)
2014–2017	Xelajú	68	(4)
2017-2018	Comunicaciones	24	(0)
2018	Xelajú	17	(1)
2018	Sololá	0	(0)
2019-2021	Sanarate	73	(2)
2021-2024	Xelajú	58	(2)

International career
2015–	Guatemala	5	(0)
- * Club domestic league appearances and goals

Aslinn Enei Rodas De León (born June 10, 1992) is a professional footballer who plays as a midfielder. Born in the United States, he represents the Guatemala national team.

== Career ==
=== Amateur ===
In college, Rodas played for Cleveland State University's college soccer team, where he was a starter all four years of college. In his freshman year, he was the All-Horizon League Newcomer Team and had three goals and two assists in his freshman year. His sophomore year saw Rodas be part of the Second Team All-Horizon, while his upperclassmen years saw him get First Team honors.

=== Professional ===
Rodas went undrafted in the 2014 MLS SuperDraft and opted to sign for Guatemalan outfit Club Xelaju. Rodas became a regular start for Chivos and made 17 starts in 18 appearances and scored one goal.

== Honours ==
Xelajú

- Liga Nacional de Guatemala: Clausura 2023
