= Pedro Báez (footballer) =

Paraguayan footballer (born 1997)

Personal information
- Full name: Pedro Federico Báez Benítez
- Date of birth: 15 January 1997 (age 29)
- Place of birth: San Estanislao, Paraguay
- Height: 6 ft 0 in (1.83 m)
- Position: Forward

Team information
- Current team: Xelajú
- Number: 9

Youth career
- Cerro Porteño

Senior career*
Years	Team	Apps	(Gls)
2016–2019	Cerro Porteño	5	(0)
2016	→ Real Salt Lake (loan)	1	(0)
2016	→ Real Monarchs (loan)	6	(2)
2017	→ Independiente FBC (loan)	9	(0)
2019–2020	La U Universitarios	23	(5)
2020	Malacateco	16	(7)
2021	San Carlos	17	(0)
2021-2022	Antigua	37	(15)
2022-2023	Real España	48	(7)
2023-2024	Malacateco	33	(12)
2024–	Xelajú	0	(0)

International career^{‡}
2016–2018	Paraguay U20	12	(5)
- * Club domestic league appearances and goals as of 19:00, 7 June 2021 (UTC) ‡ National team caps and goals as of 20 November 2017

Pedro Báez (born 15 January 1997) is a Paraguayan professional footballer who plays as a forward for Liga Guate club Xelajú.

== Career ==
Báez began his professional career in the youth squads of Cerro Porteño, before debuting for the club's first team in 2016 against Club Sol de America. During that same year, he also made appearances with the Paraguay U20 side at the 2016 Toulon Tournament in France.

On July 22, 2016, Báez was signed to a six-month loan deal with Real Salt Lake of Major League Soccer.
