= Jorlian Sánchez =

Panamanian footballer (born 1996)

Personal information
- Full name: Jorlian Abdiel Sánchez Judge
- Date of birth: 17 March 1996 (age 30)
- Place of birth: Colón, Panama
- Height: 1.80 m (5 ft 11 in)
- Position: Forward

Team information
- Current team: Sporting San Miguelito

Senior career*
Years	Team	Apps	(Gls)
2016–2017	Sporting San Miguelito	20	(9)
2017–2022	UdeG	79	(19)
2021	→ Sporting San Miguelito (loan)	6	(2)
2022–	Sporting San Miguelito	19	(10)
2023	Comunicaciones (loan)	24	(2)

International career^{‡}
2018	Panama	1	(0)
- * Club domestic league appearances and goals as of 08:01, 21 May 2023 (UTC) ‡ National team caps and goals as of 16 November 2018

Jorlian Abdiel Sánchez Judge (born 17 March 1996) is a Panamanian professional footballer who plays as a forward for Sporting San Miguelito.

== Club career ==
=== Sporting San Miguelito ===
Sánchez made his professional debut in the Liga Panameña de Fútbol. On 14 January 2017 playing his first game against Tauro F.C. ending in a 3-0 loss. Sánchez also became the top goalscorer of the 2017 Clausura LPF.

=== Leones Negros ===
Sánchez was signed on 22 August 2017 for an undisclosed amount. On his debut he scored one goal against Tampico Madero which ended in a 1-0 win.

== International career ==
He made his debut for Panama national football team on 16 November 2018 in a friendly against Honduras, as a starter.
