= Yair Jaén =

Panamanian footballer

Personal information
- Date of birth: 16 March 1997 (age 29)
- Place of birth: Panama
- Height: 1.70 m (5 ft 7 in)
- Position: Midfielder

Team information
- Current team: San Diego Loyal
- Number: 14

Senior career*
Years	Team	Apps	(Gls)
2015–2016	Atlético Nacional	3	(1)
2016–2017	Costa del Este		
2017–2018	Independiente	10	(0)
2018–2020	Costa del Este	47	(2)
2020	San Diego Loyal	4	(0)
2020–	Costa del Este	0	(0)

International career^{‡}
2017	Panama U20	5	(0)
2021–	Panama	1	(0)
- * Club domestic league appearances and goals as of 4 October 2020 ‡ National team caps and goals as of 28 January 2021

Yair Jaén (born 16 March 1997) is a Panamanian professional footballer who plays as a midfielder for Costa del Este.

== International career ==
He made his debut for Panama national football team on 28 January 2021 in a friendly game against Serbia. He substituted Jair Catuy in the 82nd minute.
