= Antonio López (footballer, born 1997) =

Footballer

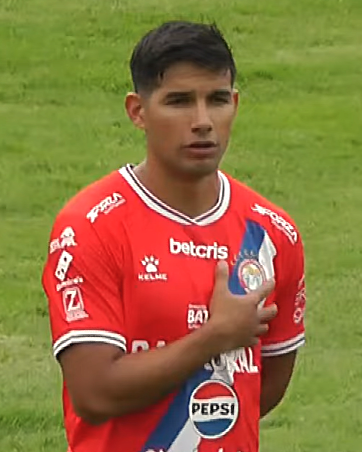
- López with Xelajú in 2025

Personal information
- Full name: Antonio de Jesús López Amenábar
- Date of birth: 10 April 1997 (age 29)
- Place of birth: Mexico City, Mexico
- Height: 1.72 m (5 ft 8 in)
- Position: Midfielder

Team information
- Current team: Xelajú
- Number: 10

Youth career
- 2012–2018: América

Senior career*
Years	Team	Apps	(Gls)
2018–2022	América	46	(0)
2022	→ Necaxa (loan)	10	(0)
2022–2023	Municipal	37	(3)
2023–2025	Comunicaciones	73	(12)
2025–	Xelajú	11	(1)

International career^{‡}
2020–	Guatemala	27	(0)
- * Club domestic league appearances and goals as of 20:00, 10 October 2025 (UTC) ‡ National team caps and goals as of 20:00, 10 October 2025 (UTC)

Antonio de Jesús López Amenábar (born 10 April 1997), commonly known as Chucho, is a professional footballer who plays as a midfielder for Liga Bantrab club Xelajú. Born in Mexico, he plays for the Guatemala national team.

== Early life ==
López was born on 10 April 1997 in the Cuauhtémoc district of Mexico City.

López began his career in the U-15 category of Club América in 2012.

== Club career ==
=== América ===
==== 2018–19: Debut season, first league title, and Copa MX title ====
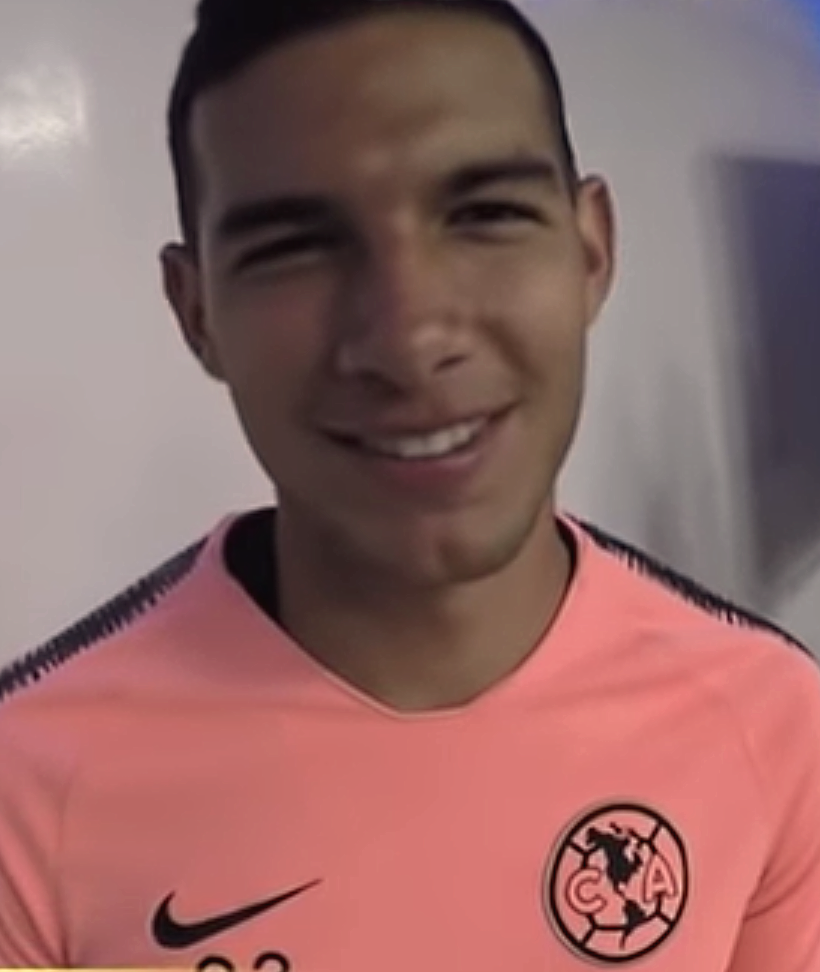
López with América in 2018

For the Liga MX Apertura 2018 tournament, América's head coach Miguel Herrera decided to register him in the first team roster. On 22 July 2018, he made his Liga MX debut coming in as a substitute for Henry Martín on the 83rd minute of the match against Necaxa.

==== 2021–22: Loan to Necaxa and departure ====
On 17 January 2022, Necaxa officially confirmed they acquired López on loan.

=== Municipal ===
After his contract with América expired, on 24 June, Municipal of the Liga Nacional announced the signing of López as a free agent, at the request of manager Juan Antonio Torres.

=== Comunicaciones ===
On 15 June 2023, after one season with Municipal, López signed for their biggest rivals, Comunicaciones.

On 15 May 2025, Comunicaciones confirmed that López would not continue with the club.

=== Xelajú ===
On 16 May 2025, López had officially signed for Xelajú.

== International career ==
=== Mexico ===
López had the dream of being with the Mexico U23 squad and helping them qualify for the 2020 Summer Olympics, but after not being considered by manager Jaime Lozano, he made the decision to defend his maternal grandfather's homeland.

=== Guatemala ===
His Guatemalan ancestry allowed López to be summoned by the Guatemala national team since his maternal grandfather is from Quetzaltenango, Guatemala. On 23 September 2020, he received his first call-up for Guatemala by manager Amarini Villatoro for a friendly match against Mexico.

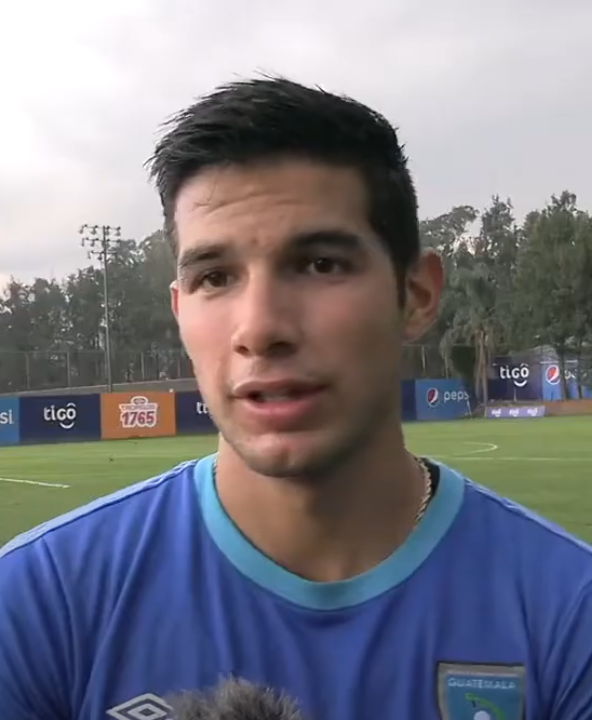
López with Guatemala in 2022

On 21 June 2023, López was called up to the Guatemala squad for the 2023 CONCACAF Gold Cup.

== Career statistics ==
=== International ===
As of match played 10 October 2025

National team	Year	Apps	Goals
Guatemala	2020	3	0
Guatemala	2021	1	0
Guatemala	2022	13	0
Guatemala	2023	7	0
Guatemala	2024	1	0
Guatemala	2025	1	0
Total		27	0

== Honours ==
América

- Liga MX: Apertura 2018
- Copa MX: Clausura 2019
- Campeón de Campeones: 2019

Comunicaciones

- Liga Guate: Apertura 2023
