= Anthony Hernández (footballer, born 2001) =

Costa Rican footballer (born 2001)

Personal information
- Full name: Anthony William Hernández González
- Date of birth: 11 October 2001 (age 25)
- Place of birth: Puntarenas, Costa Rica
- Height: 1.79 m (5 ft 10 in)
- Position: Forward

Team information
- Current team: Alajuelense

Senior career*
| Years | Team | Apps | (Gls) |
| 2020–2023 | Puntarenas | 35 | (7) |
| 2023– | Alajuelense | 67 | (9) |
| 2024–2025 | Puntarenas (loan) | 33 | (10) |

International career^{‡}
| 2022– | Costa Rica | 6 | (1) |
- * Club domestic league appearances and goals as of 22:14 (UTC) 5 September 2026 ‡ National team caps and goals as of 23:13 (UTC) 4 October 2026

Anthony William Hernández González (born 11 October 2001) is a Costa Rican professional footballer who plays as a forward for Liga FPD club Alajuelense and the Costa Rica national team.

== Club career ==
Hernández started playing for Puntarenas in 2020. In May 2022, Puntarenas beat Carmelita 3–0 on aggregate to earn promotion from Segunda División de Costa Rica to Costa Rica's top flight for the first time since 2014. Hernández made his debut in the top flight on 20 July 2022 as his side won 3–0 against A.D. San Carlos. He scored his first professional goal on 11 August 2022, in a 3–1 win against Municipal Grecia.

He signed for Alajuelense in July 2023 on a three-year contract.

== International career ==
Born in Costa Rica, Hernández is of Jamaican descent. On 23 August 2022 he made his debut for the Costa Rica national team against South Korea, coming on in the 65th minute for Jewison Bennette in a 2–2 draw. Hernández scored his first goal for Costa Rica on 27 September 2022 against Uzbekistan. He was named in the Costa Rica squad for the 2022 FIFA World Cup.

== Career statistics ==
=== International ===
As of match played 4 October 2026

Appearances and goals by national team and year
| National team | Year | Apps | Goals |
|---|---|---|---|
| Costa Rica | 2022 | 3 | 1 |
| Costa Rica | 2025 | 2 | 0 |
| Costa Rica | 2026 | 1 | 0 |
| Total | | 6 | 1 |

| No. | Date | Venue | Opponent | Score | Result | Competition |
|---|---|---|---|---|---|---|
| 1. | 27 September 2022 | Suwon World Cup Stadium, Suwon, South Korea | Uzbekistan | 1–1 | 2–1 | Friendly |
