= Brayan Moya =

Honduran footballer (born 1993)

Personal information
- Full name: Brayan Josué Velásquez Moya
- Date of birth: 19 October 1993 (age 33)
- Place of birth: San Antonio de Oriente, Honduras
- Height: 1.75 m (5 ft 9 in)
- Positions: Attacking midfielder; forward

Senior career*
| Years | Team | Apps | (Gls) |
| 2015–2016 | Vida | 42 | (6) |
| 2016–2019 | Olimpia | 53 | (12) |
| 2019–2020 | Zulia | 31 | (13) |
| 2020–2021 | Primeiro de Agosto | 20 | (4) |
| 2022–2024 | Olimpia | 37 | (11) |
| 2024 | → Real España (loan) | 16 | (1) |
| 2024-2025 | Real España | 47 | (12) |
| 2012-2015 | Chicago Mustangs indoor | 38 | (73) |

International career^{‡}
| 2021 | Honduras Olympic (O.P.) | 1 | (0) |
| 2019– | Honduras | 18 | (4) |
- * Club domestic league appearances and goals as of 10 September 2023 ‡ National team caps and goals as of 23 December 2022

Brayan Josué Velásquez Moya (born 19 October 1993) is a Honduran professional footballer who plays as an attacking midfielder or forward for the Honduras national team.

== Club career ==
Moya made his professional debut for C.D.S. Vida on 23 August 2015 in the Liga Nacional de Fútbol Profesional de Honduras. He replaced Marcelo Canales in a 1–0 defeat against C.D. Victoria. He scored his first goal the following 19 September in a 2–1 win against C.D. Honduras Progreso.

On 22 December 2016, C.D. Olimpia confirmed the signing of Moya.< He made his debut – as a starter – for the club the following 8 January in the 5–2 home win against Honduras Progreso in the Clausura tournament. He scored his first goal for Los Albos on 7 October 2017, the winner in a 2–1 away win against Platense F.C.

On 7 January 2019, Moya signed with Venezuelan Primera División side Zulia F.C. The following 17 February, Moya made his debut coming off the bench and scoring a brace in the 2–1 win over Academia Puerto Cabello.

On 15 July 2020, Moya joined Angolan Girabola side C.D. Primeiro de Agosto. He made his debut on 28 October in the 3–1 win against FC Valientes de Maquis. He scored his first goal three days later in a 3–2 win over G.D. Sagrada Esperança. On 9 November 2021, Primeiro de Agosto terminated Moya's contract, due to a legal problem surrounding his previous club, Zulia, claiming that he still had a contract with them.

On 14 January 2022, Moya returned to Olimpia. He scored his first goal in his second spell at the club, in a 3–0 home win against Honduras Progreso in the league.

== International career ==
Moya received his first ever national team call-up on 28 August 2019 for friendlies against Puerto Rico and Chile. He made his international debut for Honduras on 5 September 2019 in the 4–0 win against Puerto Rico and scored his first international goal against Trinidad and Tobago the following 10 October in 2–0 victory during the CONCACAF Nations League.

In July 2021, Moya was called up as one of the three overage players to be included in Honduras' squad for the 2020 Summer Olympics in Tokyo, Japan.

=== International goals ===
Scores and results list Honduras' goal tally first.

| No. | Date | Venue | Opponent | Score | Result | Competition |
|---|---|---|---|---|---|---|
| 1. | 10 October 2019 | Hasely Crawford Stadium, Port of Spain, Trinidad and Tobago | Trinidad and Tobago | 1–0 | 2–0 | 2019–20 CONCACAF Nations League A |
| 2. | 17 November 2019 | Estadio Olímpico Metropolitano, San Pedro Sula, Honduras | Trinidad and Tobago | 2–0 | 4–0 | 2019–20 CONCACAF Nations League A |
| 3. | 8 September 2021 | Estadio Olímpico Metropolitano, San Pedro Sula, Honduras | United States | 1–0 | 1–4 | 2022 FIFA World Cup qualification |
| 4. | 12 November 2021 | Estadio Olímpico Metropolitano, San Pedro Sula, Honduras | Panama | 2–0 | 2–3 | 2022 FIFA World Cup qualification |

== Honours ==
Olimpia

- Liga Nacional: 2016 Clausura, 2022 Apertura
- CONCACAF League: 2017, 2022
