= Jorge Benguché =

Honduran footballer (born 1996)

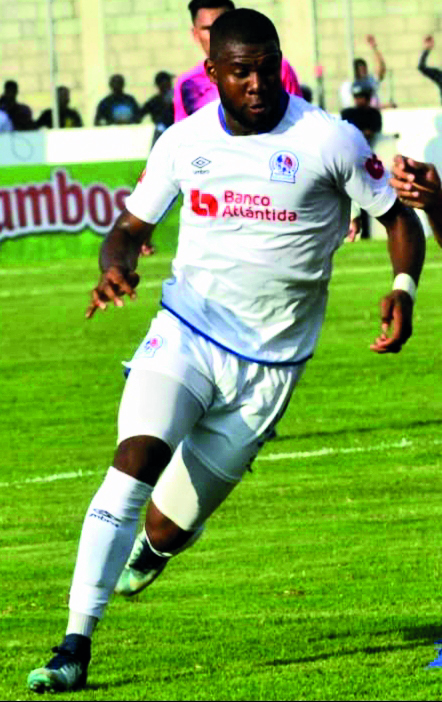
- Benguché with Olimpia in 2019

Personal information
- Full name: Jorge Renán Benguché Ramírez
- Date of birth: 21 May 1996 (age 30)
- Place of birth: Olanchito, Honduras
- Height: 1.88 m (6 ft 2 in)
- Position: Striker

Team information
- Current team: Olimpia
- Number: 9

Youth career
- Olimpia

Senior career*
Years	Team	Apps	(Gls)
2014–	Olimpia	218	(78)
2015	→ Juticalpa (loan)	8	(0)
2018	→ UPNFM (loan)	31	(12)
2020–2021	→ Boavista (loan)	14	(0)
2022	→ Cerro Largo (loan)	16	(1)
2024	→ Bellinzona (loan)	7	(0)

International career^{‡}
2021	Honduras Olympic	3	(0)
2019–	Honduras	32	(5)
Medal record
Men's football
Representing Honduras
CONCACAF Nations League
Bronze medal – third place	2021
- * Club domestic league appearances and goals as of 3 May 2026 ‡ National team caps and goals as of 7 June 2026

Jorge Renán Benguché Ramírez (born 21 May 1996) is a Honduran professional footballer who plays as a striker for Liga Nacional club Olimpia and the Honduras national team.

== Club career ==
Benguché made his debut on 12 October 2014, in a 3–0 win against C.D. Victoria. He came on as a 56th-minute substitute for Anthony Lozano and scored his first goal eight minutes later.

On 7 August 2015, Benguché was loaned to Juticalpa F.C. He made his debut two days later in a 2–0 home win against Real España.

On 9 January 2018, Benguché joined Lobos UPNFM on a year-long loan. His first appearance for the side came on 28 January in a 2–1 home win over Vida. He scored his first goal on 7 February in a 1–0 away win over Real España.

On 17 August 2020, Benguché signed for Portuguese club Boavista F.C. on loan for the entire season. He made his league debut the following 19 September in a 3–3 draw against C.D. Nacional. Benguché scored his first goal on 12 December, a late consolation in a 2–1 away loss to G.D. Estoril Praia in the Taça de Portugal.

On 4 January 2022, Benguché signed with Uruguayan club Cerro Largo F.C. on a one-year contract.

== International career ==
Benguché was called up to the national team by head coach Fabián Coito for friendlies against Puerto Rico and Chile in September 2019. He made his national team debut on 6 September 2019 in 4–0 win against Puerto Rico. He started the game and scored two goals before getting substituted for Alberth Elis at 74th minute of the game.

== Career statistics ==
=== International ===
As of match played 6 June 2026

Appearances and goals by national team and year
National team	Year	Apps	Goals
Honduras	2019	3	2
Honduras	2021	3	0
Honduras	2023	7	1
Honduras	2024	4	1
Honduras	2025	13	1
Honduras	2026	2	0
Total		32	5

Scores and results list Honduras' goal tally first, score column indicates score after each Benguché goal.

List of international goals scored by Jorge Benguché
No.	Date	Venue	Opponent	Score	Result	Competition
1	6 September 2019	Estadio Nacional Chelato Uclés, Tegucigalpa, Honduras	Puerto Rico	2–0	4–0	Friendly
2	6 September 2019	Estadio Nacional Chelato Uclés, Tegucigalpa, Honduras	Puerto Rico	4–0	4–0	Friendly
3	28 March 2023	BMO Field, Toronto, Canada	Canada	1–3	1–4	2022–23 CONCACAF Nations League
4	10 October 2024	Stade Omnisports, Sinnamary, French Guiana	French Guiana	3–1	3–2	2024–25 CONCACAF Nations League
5	25 March 2025	Estadio Nacional Chelato Uclés, Tegucigalpa, Honduras	Bermuda	1–0	2–0	2025 CONCACAF Gold Cup qualification

== Honours ==
Olimpia

- Liga Nacional de Fútbol Profesional de Honduras: Clausura 2015, Apertura 2019, Apertura 2021
- CONCACAF League: 2017
