= CSD Xelajú MC =

Association football club in Guatemala

Xelajú
- Full name: Club Social y Deportivo; Xelajú Mario Camposeco
- Nicknames: Los Chivos (The Goats); Los Superchivos (The Super Goats); Los Altenses (The Highlanders); Los Aguerridos (The Brave Ones); El Gigante Departamental (The Departmental Giant)
- Short name: Xela
- Founded: 24 February 1942; 84 years ago
- Ground: Estadio Mario Camposeco
- Capacity: 11,220
- Chairman: Francisco Santos
- Manager: Roberto Hernández
- League: Liga Bantrab
- Clausura 2024: 9th
Home colours	Away colours	Third colours

Club Social y Deportivo Xelajú Mario Camposeco (Spanish pronunciation: [ˈklub soˈθjal ˈi ˌdepoɾˈtiβo ˌselaˈxu ˈmaɾjo ˌkampoˈseko]), commonly known as Xelajú MC or just Xela and nicknamed Superchivos is a Guatemalan professional football club competing in the Liga Bantrab, the top tier of Guatemalan football.

They are located in Quetzaltenango, Department of Quetzaltenango, and play their home matches in the Estadio Mario Camposeco. They are the most successful team (in terms of national titles won) not based in the capital city in the history of the league.

== History ==
The club was founded in 1928 as Germania; after ten years of existence, their name would be changed to ADIX (Asociación Deportiva Independiente de Xelajú), and during that time the uniform colors were established as red jersey and blue shorts, a combination that remains to date. The team was renamed Xelajú Mario Camposeco in honor of local footballer Mario Camposeco who was the captain of the club in the 1940s, helped them win 10 consecutive Quetzaltenango department titles, and who was still an active player when he died in a plane crash in 1951.

The Superchivos have been Guatemalan champions seven times, in 1961–62, 1980, 1995–96, 2006–07, 2011–12, 2022-23, and 2024. Xelajú has won the Copa Centenario once, in 1972–73. In the 2007 Clausura tournament, they eliminated five-time defending champion Municipal in semi-finals, to reach their first final since the inception of the Apertura/Clausura format. They faced Marquense, losing the first match 0–1 and winning the second match 4–1, for an aggregate score of 4–2 which gave them their fourth championship. It was the first time since 1980 that two teams from outside of Guatemala City finished first and runner-up. The club currently has a kit deal with Spanish-based company Kelme. Past kit sponsors include Joma, Lotto, Vicnar, Puma, MR, Reto Sports, and Do More.

They have a fierce rivalry with Suchitepéquez, which is known as the Clásico del Suroccidente, one with Marquense known as the Clasico de Occidente, and inner department rivals Coatepeque known as the Derbi de Quetzaltenango. Their other known rivalry also consist of Antigua and a fierce rival with Comunicaciones which is known as El Clasico del Oeste.

== Crest ==
The club's shield is circular in shape, it has written in white letters the name of the team around the circumference, in the center it has a goat and the background is a yellow soccer ball. For each title the club gets, a Moon is added to the shield.

== Supporters ==
Xelajú has the largest fan base outside of the capital department and have great tradition within Guatemalan football. They are considered as one of the biggest fanbases in all of Central American football. One of the most typical characteristics of the supporters is the way they sing Luna de Xelajú, a theme considered as the anthem of Quetzaltenango.

=== Anti-Xelajú Fans ===
The fact that the team has a greater number of spectators also makes the sporting resentment towards them evident in terms of cultural impact, clear examples being the fans of Comunicaciones, Municipal, Antigua, Marquense, Suchitepéquez, Juventud Retalteca, Malacateco, Zacapa, and many other fans, as well as Coatepeque and the most recent Cobán Imperial, this has led to them being classified as one of the most hated clubs in all of Guatemala, as well as in many parts of Central America, especially with fans of FAS from El Salvador and Olimpia from Honduras.

== Honours ==
=== Domestic honours ===
==== Leagues ====
- Liga Guate
  - Champions (7): 1961–62, 1980, 1995–96, 2007 Clausura, 2012 Clausura, 2023 Clausura, 2024 Apertura

==== Cups ====
- Copa de Guatemala and predecessors
  - Champions (3): 1963, 1973, 2010

== Performance in international competitions ==
- CONCACAF Champions' Cup

1997 - Second Round

- UNCAF Interclub Cup

2007 - Quarterfinals

- CONCACAF Champions League

2012-13 - Quarterfinals

- CONCACAF Central American Cup

2023 - Group Stage
2025

== Players ==
=== Current squad ===
As of 21 August, 2026
Note: Flags indicate national team as defined under FIFA eligibility rules; some limited exceptions apply. Players may hold more than one non-FIFA nationality.

No.	Pos.	Nation	Player
1	GK	URU	Rubén Darío Silva
5	DF	MEX	Ernesto Monreal
6	MF	GUA	Maynor de León (captain)
7	FW	COL	Yilton Loboa
8	MF	GUA	Joshua Ubico
9	FW	URU	Diego Casas
10	MF	GUA	Antonio López
11	FW	CRC	Steven Cárdenas
12	DF	GUA	Erick González
13	DF	GUA	Widvin Tebalan
14	DF	GUA	Javier Gónzalez
16	MF	GUA	Juan Cardona
18	DF	GUA	José Castañeda
20	FW	GUA	Harim Quezada

No.	Pos.	Nation	Player
21	FW	MEX	Ángel López
23	DF	GUA	Raúl Calderón
25	DF	GUA	Kevin Ruiz
26	FW	GUA	Elmer Cardoza
28	MF	GUA	Claudio de Oliveira
29	GK	GUA	Estuardo Chang
30	FW	GUA	Oscar de León
31	MF	GUA	Ricardo Márquez
52	MF	GUA	Jorge Aparicio
70	DF	GUA	José Longo
71	FW	GUA	Óscar Mejía
77	FW	PAN	Yair Jaén
89	GK	CRC	Minor Álvarez (on loan from Saprissa)
98	GK	GUA	Estuardo Sicán

=== Out on loan ===
Note: Flags indicate national team as defined under FIFA eligibility rules; some limited exceptions apply. Players may hold more than one non-FIFA nationality.

No.	Pos.	Nation	Player

=== In ===
Note: Flags indicate national team as defined under FIFA eligibility rules; some limited exceptions apply. Players may hold more than one non-FIFA nationality.

No.	Pos.	Nation	Player
—		CRC	Steven Cárdena (From Sporting F.C.)
—		GUA	TBD (From TBD)
—		GUA	TBD (From TBD)
—		GUA	TBD (From TBD)
—		GUA	TBD (From TBD)

No.	Pos.	Nation	Player
—		GUA	TBD (From TBD)
—		GUA	TBD (From TBD)
—		GUA	TBD (From TBD)

=== Out ===
Note: Flags indicate national team as defined under FIFA eligibility rules; some limited exceptions apply. Players may hold more than one non-FIFA nationality.

No.	Pos.	Nation	Player
—		PAN	José Calderón (To TBD)
—		PAN	Harold Cummings (To TBD)
—		CRC	Aarón Navarro (To TBD)
—		MEX	Óscar Villa (To TBD)
—		GUA	TBD (To TBD)

No.	Pos.	Nation	Player
—		GUA	TBD (To TBD)
—		GUA	TBD (To TBD)
—		GUA	TBD (To TBD)
—		GUA	TBD (To TBD)
—		GUA	TBD (To TBD)

== Staff ==
=== Coaching staff ===
As of 15 January 2026

Position	Staff
Coach	(Mexico) Roberto Hernández (*)
Assistant manager	(Guatemala) TBD (*)
Reserve manager	(Guatemala) TBD (*)
Goalkeeper Coach	(Guatemala) TBD (*)
Under 17 Manager	(Guatemala) TBD (*)
Under 15 Manager	(Guatemala) TBD (*)
Sporting director	(Guatemala) TBD (*)
Fitness Coach	(Guatemala) TBD (*)
Team Doctor	(Guatemala) TBD (*)
Fitness Coach	(Guatemala) TBD (*)
Physiotherapy	(Guatemala) TBD (*)
Utility	(Guatemala) TBD (*)

== Notable former players ==
- (Mexico) Sergio Anaya (FW) (1959–1966)
- (Honduras) Mariano Crisanto Meléndez (FW) (1995-1996)
- (Guatemala) Mario Camposeco (FW) (1942–1951)
- (Guatemala) Julio Ariz Leiva (FW) (2003-2004)
- (Guatemala) Minor López (FW) (2007-2011)
- (Guatemala) Wilber Pérez (FW) (2020-2022)
- (Guatemala) Mario Castellanos (FW) (2017-2021)
- (Guatemala) Darwin Lom (FW) (2022-2023)
- (Guatemala) Julio Estacuy (DF) (2005-2019)
- (Guatemala) Milton Leal (DF) (2009-2020)
- (Guatemala) Fredy Santiago (DF) (2009-2016)
- (Guatemala) Wilber Caal (DF) (2012-2014)
- (Guatemala) Jhony Girón (DF) (2006-2015)
- (Guatemala) Néstor Jucup (MF) (2008-2019)
- (Guatemala) Marco Pappa (MF) (2018-2019)
- (Guatemala) Aslinn Rodas (MF) (2014-2024)
- (Guatemala) Frank de León (MF) (2023-2024)
- (Guatemala) Edgar Macal (MF) (2017-2022)
- (Guatemala) Kevin Arriola (MF) (2012-2017)
- (Guatemala) Édgar Chinchilla (FW) (2011-2015)
- (Costa Rica) Jhonny Cubero (FW) (2005–2010)
- (Costa Rica) Fernando Patterson (GK) (1996–2008)
- (Costa Rica) Sergio Morales (MF) (2004–2013)
- (Costa Rica) Kenner Gutiérrez (DF) (2022-2023)
- (El Salvador) Jorge Suárez (GK) (1981–1982)
- (El Salvador) Mauricio Quintanilla (FW) (1979–1982)
- (El Salvador) Alexander Larín (DF) (2021)
- (Brazil) Israel Silva (FW) (2004–2021)
- (Brazil) Juliano Rangel (DF) (2013-2016)

== Managerial history ==
- (Costa Rica) Roberto Chávez Lozano (1961–1962)
- (Guatemala) Aníbal Villagrán (1963)
- (Spain) Asisclo Sáenz (1963–1964)
- (Hungary) Ferenc Meszaros (1966)
- (Guatemala) Arnoldo Camposeco (1972–1973)
- (Mexico) Sergio Anaya (1978)
- (Chile) Javier Mascaró (1980)
- (Uruguay) Orlando de León (1981)
- (Chile) Javier Mascaró (1991–1992)
- (Costa Rica) Marvin Rodríguez (1995–1996)
- (Guatemala) Walter Claverí (2000)
- (Guatemala) Camilo Aguilar (2001)
- (Uruguay) Julio Antúnez (2001–2004)
- (Honduras) Edwin Pavón (2004)
- (Brazil) Luis da Costa (2005–2006)
- (Uruguay) Carlos Jurado (2007)
- (Guatemala) Gabriel Castillo (2008–2009)
- (Argentina) Alberto Jorge (2009–2010)
- (Argentina) Horacio Cordero (2010)
- (Spain) Francisco Lobato (2010)
- (Guatemala) Gustavo Adolfo Cifuentes (2010)
- (Uruguay) Carlos Jurado (2010–2011)
- (Costa Rica) Hernán Medford (2011–2013)
- (Uruguay) Saul Lorenzo Rivero (2013–2014)
- (Argentina) Hector Julian Trujillo (2013–2014)
- (Uruguay) Carlos Jurado (2014)
- (Honduras) Nahúm Espinoza (2014–2015)
- (Costa Rica) Hernán Medford (2015-2016)
- (Uruguay) Carlos Jurado (2016)
- (Mexico) Rafael Loredo (2016)
- (Costa Rica) Ronald Gómez (2016-2018)
- (Guatemala) Walter Claverí (2018)
- (Argentina) Ramiro Cepeda (2018-2019)
- (Guatemala) Walter Horacio González (2019)
- (Argentina) Sergio Egea (2019-2020)
- (Guatemala) Walter Claverí (2020)
- (Guatemala) Marcó Antonio Morales (interim) (2020-2021)
- (Uruguay) Gustavo Machaín (2021)
- (Guatemala) Marcó Antonio Morales (2021)
- (Mexico) Irving Rubirosa (2021-2022)
- (Guatemala) Amarini Villatoro (2022-present)
